= Athletic Bilbao signing policy =

Rule to sign only Basque football players

The Basque flag

Since 1911, the Spanish football club Athletic Bilbao has had an unwritten rule whereby the club will only sign players who were born or raised in the Basque Country or who learned their football skills at a Basque club. On occasion, youth players have also been invited to join due to ancestral links to the region, but no senior players have been signed based on Basque heritage alone.

The policy is related to Basque nationalism and has been praised as a way to promote local talent, although it has been criticised as being discriminatory.

With regards to coaching staff, including managerial positions, those roles are eligible for non-Basques, both from other regions in Spain and elsewhere in the world.

== History ==
In the first decade of their existence, Athletic selected English players for the team but since 1911, they have adhered to a policy of allowing only players born in the Basque Country or who learned their football skills at a Basque club to play for them. The rhyming motto used to describe the reasoning behind it is Con cantera y afición, no hace falta importación (English: "with home-grown talent and local support, there's no need for imports").

In 1911, a dispute occurred between Athletic Bilbao and fellow Basque club Real Sociedad regarding the former fielding ineligible English players in the 1911 Copa del Rey; they had also employed the services of several (non-Basque) players from Atlético Madrid which was then a branch of the Bilbao club. The dispute led to the Royal Spanish Football Federation introducing a rule for the next year's competition that all players must be Spanish citizens. As a large proportion of the best players in that early era were Basque, relying on locals was no impediment to Athletic and they chose to maintain that approach even when the regulations were relaxed some years later. English forward Andrew Veitch (who was not part of the 1911 protest as he had already played for the club in the previous year's competition) played and scored in the final and is known as the last foreigner to make a competitive appearance for Athletic outside the boundaries of their own criteria.

Location of the Greater Basque Country, from which Athletic Bilbao recruits all its players

The policy is not written into the Athletic Bilbao rulebook but specific criteria were added to the club's upgraded website in 2008; the approach has become a philosophy of the club in order to promote local players under the cantera (homegrown) system. The policy also extends to Athletic's reserves, their farm team CD Basconia, their youth teams and their women's football department. It does not apply to the coaching staff, with managers from England, Hungary, Germany, France and Argentina among those to have led the team at various times.

They were not the only club to adhere to this approach; Real Sociedad had a similar policy from 1962 (when they were relegated and chose to rebuild their squad using their reserves, which had limited impact in the short term but eventually led to the club winning two consecutive league titles in the early 1980s – as Athletic also did – while adhering to the self-imposed restriction) but it was dropped for foreign imports in 1989 when they signed the Republic of Ireland forward John Aldridge, soon followed by their first black player Dalian Atkinson, and they made their first non-Basque Spanish signing in 2002 with the transfer of Boris from Real Oviedo. However, the San Sebastián-based club still places a high importance on producing their own local players, and a high percentage of their squad in the 2010s were home-grown.

The policy has been praised as a symbol of localised football being successful at the highest level, as well as preserving a strong regional identity and being a way for Basque nationalism to be moderately expressed. It has been described as discriminatory for only allowing Basque players to play for Athletic Bilbao, although it has been suggested that the policy is working for them since Athletic is one of only three clubs (along with Real Madrid and Barcelona) never to have been relegated from La Liga.

== Origins of players ==
=== Ethnic minorities ===
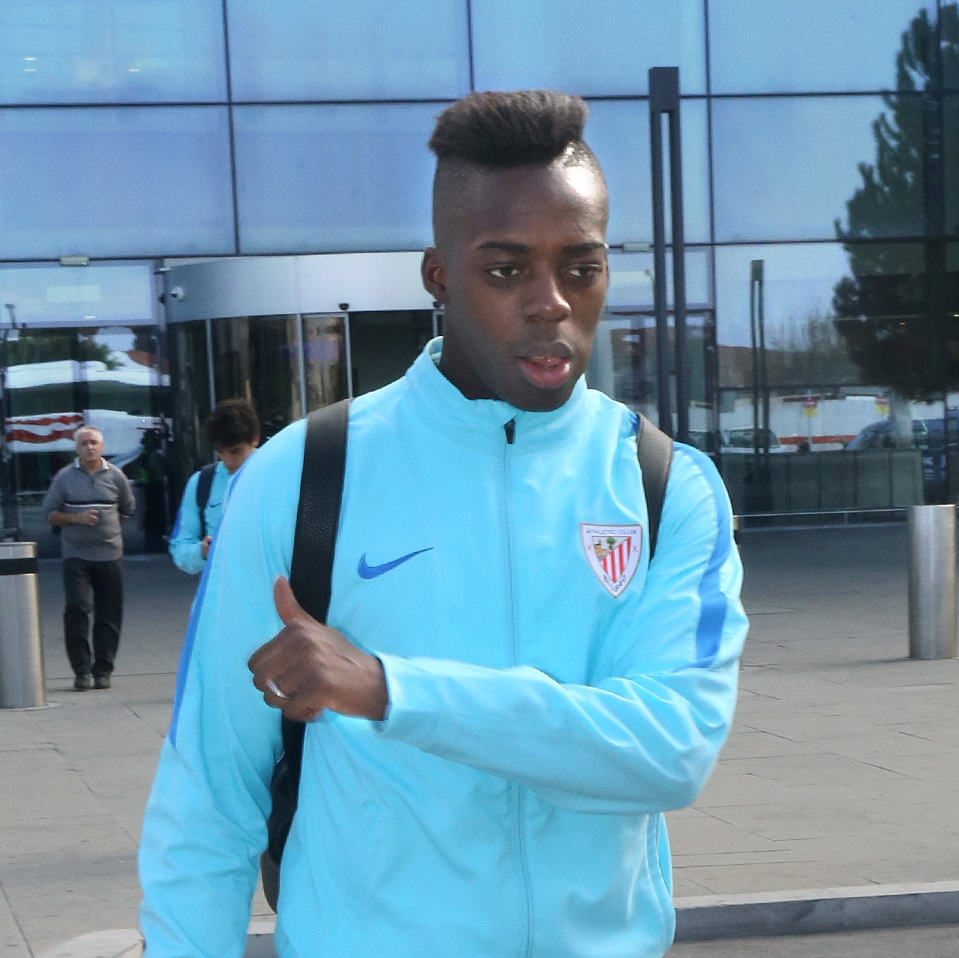
Iñaki Williams, of West African origin but born and raised in the Basque region

Due to a relatively low immigrant population in the region, the policy also had the consequence of Athletic Bilbao having been the last club in La Liga to field a black player. That player was Jonás Ramalho, whose father is Angolan, who made his debut in 2011. In 2015, Iñaki Williams (Born in Bilbao to Ghanaian immigrant parents, who reached Spain by crossing the Sahara on barefoot and jumping the Melilla border fence), became Athletic's first black goalscorer. A decade later, Williams was named club captain after making over 400 appearances. Prior to Ramalho, in 2000 the first African-born player in the club's youth system was Blanchard Moussayou whose promising career was curtailed by injury; some years later, he stated his belief that it was 'twice as hard' for a black player to make an impact at the club. Gorka Luariz, a forward of mixed ethnicity capped by Equatorial Guinea in 2018, spent time in Athletic's youth system despite being born in Zaragoza as his upbringing was almost entirely in the Basque region. Another international player, Yaser Hamed, born in Biscay to a Palestinian father, spent five years with the club as a child before moving around several local semi-professional teams and clubs in Bahrain, Egypt and Qatar.

Former academy trainee Yuri Berchiche, who rejoined Athletic in the summer of 2018 as one of the club's most expensive signings, has an Algerian father but showed no interest in playing for their national team when the matter was put to him. By coincidence, Berchiche's hometown Zarautz, west of San Sebastián, is also that of Álex Padilla, a goalkeeper of partial Mexican heritage and upbringing who had already played for that nation at under-23 level before he made his first team debut in 2024.

As of 2019, Athletic's academy teams included a small number of players of an ethnic minority (mostly Afro-Spaniard) background, including Cameroon-born pair Christophe Atangana (a goalkeeper), and defender Loic Boum who was orphaned as a child and was a ward of the Government of Navarre when he joined the club in 2014 plus forward Nico Williams, the younger brother of Iñaki, who made his first-team debut in 2021 and soon developed into a player of international quality, subsequently winning the UEFA European Championship with Spain in 2024 and FIFA World Cup in 2026. In 2021, the older youth teams featured a Colombia-born goalkeeper Kevin Rios and a handful of others who had mostly been at the club for several years. Winger Malcom Adu Ares, from Bilbao with Bissau-Guinean heritage, made his debut aged 20 in 2022, but he only joined the club a year earlier and had not been part of the setup as a teenager.

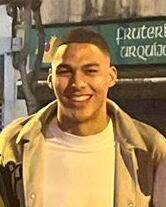
Maroan Sannadi, of Moroccan origin but born and raised in the Basque region

By 2024, the reserve teams contained several promising players of partial or full African origin including Adama Boiro, Junior Bita, Igor Oyono and Elijah Gift, while new signing Álvaro Djaló was in the main squad – cousin of Adu Ares, the winger joined for an initial €15 million fee (one of the club's biggest transfer outlays) from SC Braga of Portugal, having developed there and with no immediately obvious Basque links due to being born in Madrid and of West African heritage; however, most of his childhood was spent in Bilbao. Djaló and Boiro appeared for the first team several times that season before the club signed Maroan Sannadi, a forward of Moroccan origin born and raised in Vitoria-Gasteiz. Quickly pressed into elite action at club level for the first time in his career, Sannadi made his debut for Morocco in June 2025, becoming the first Athletic player to represent any North African or Arab nation as a full international. Six months later, half-Brazilian midfielder Selton Sánchez – cousin of Roberto Firmino, made his first-team debut at the age 18.

=== French players ===
The club has also recruited players from the French Northern Basque Country (a region of 300,000 where rugby union is the most popular sport) with Bixente Lizarazu being the first French-Basque to play for the senior team in 1996.

The signing of Aymeric Laporte prompted debate among supporters and columnists regarding the definitions of the policy when he became the first Frenchman to successfully graduate from the club's youth system in 2012, as he had no link to the Basque region through birth or residency, and a blood link only via great-grandparents. He did play for a team in the territory, Aviron Bayonnais, but only by arrangement after the initial approach from Athletic in 2009, as he was too young to move to a club outside France at the time – he arrived formally in 2010.

Yanis Rahmani, a Frenchman of Algerian origin raised in Sestao, progressed as far as Basconia at the same time as Laporte but did not turn professional with the club. Others have progressed no further than youth level. In 2024, Johaneko Louis-Jean (a Bayonne native of Afro-Caribbean descent) joined the club following the financial collapse of his previous team Bordeaux; He made his senior debut in 2026.

==== Griezmann debate ====
Antoine Griezmann, the French forward developed by Real Sociedad, was the subject of debate regarding his eligibility for a theoretical move to Athletic as he emerged as an elite player in 2012. Hailing from Burgundy, he arrived at the San Sebastián club aged 14 but only to play football for their academy teams rather than for some other non-sporting reason, and has no connection to the French Basque Country other than attending school there after signing for Real.

The opinions of some (including Athletic's academy director José María Amorrortu) were that his training at a Basque club from a young age adhered to the policy, while others insisted that he had the same (ineligible) status as any adult player transferred in by Real and the other local professional clubs. In any event, Griezmann showed little interest in joining Athletic, subsequently moved on to Atlético Madrid and was voted the world's third best player in 2016, making any move to Bilbao unlikely in the medium term. The debate resurfaced again briefly in 2022 when a nominee for the Athletic presidency mentioned the Frenchman (who by now had joined FC Barcelona then returned to Atlético) as a potential target should his candidacy be successful.

A similar scenario unfolded with Javi López, a defender from Tenerife who joined Alavés aged 15; based on Amorrortu's stance on Griezmann, it was speculated in the media that Athletic would also consider him eligible, and though he did remain at Alavés and developed into a top-level player, it was Real Sociedad who signed him in 2024. With other Basque clubs increasingly broadening their horizons for youth recruitment, Athletic's stance on acquiring such 'imported' academy players – as opposed to, for example, earlier signings from La Rioja who had joined Osasuna as that was the closest professional club to their hometown – remained undefined in the mid-2020s.

=== Players of Basque descent ===
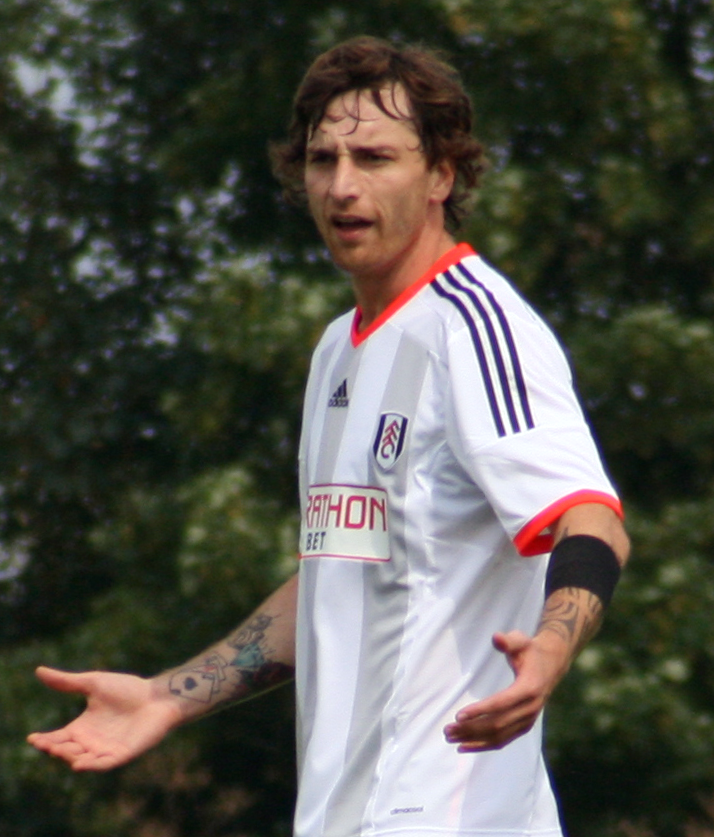
Fernando Amorebieta, born in Venezuela but raised in the Basque Country

In 1980 the club was believed to have given serious consideration to signing Iker Zubizarreta, a young Venezuelan of Basque heritage (his grandfather Félix played for Athletic in the 1910s) who had impressed at the football tournament at the 1980 Summer Olympics, but decided not to pursue it.

In 2011, media sources claimed that Athletic had shown interest in young Mexican midfielder Jonathan Espericueta but no such move materialised, and the player himself (who did later play in Spain with Villarreal B) stated that his Basque connection was as distant as a great-great-grandfather.

The Uruguayan international Diego Forlán, whose paternal grandmother was from Hondarribia, claimed he had talks over a potential transfer to the club in 2004 but this signing would have been incompatible with the club's stated policy as Forlan was not born in a Basque region, nor did he play football as a youth (or at any point in his career) at a club in the territory. That is also true of Argentinian forward Gonzalo Higuaín and Spaniards Benjamín Zarandona, Kepa Blanco and Jorge López, all players with tenuous Basque links who were also said to have been considered as potential signings by the club's presidential candidates when Athletic were struggling on the field in the mid-2000s under the restrictions of the policy. In 2015 the Australian winger Tommy Oar (with Basque-born grandparents) was the subject of similar speculation, and having been linked to the club at the start of his successful career, Higuain's name was mentioned in the media again 14 years later as he reached veteran status. Multiple UEFA Champions League winner Marco Asensio's Basque father, a former footballer, suggested his son to Athletic as a potential signing early in his career, only to be informed that Mallorca-born Marco did not fit the philosophy. But despite these examples of the rule being applied consistently, Mario Bermejo, a Cantabrian also with a Basque father but trained at Racing Santander, did sign for the club as a promising young player in 1996, which he later stated was smoothed by an Athletic director being an acquaintance of his uncle.

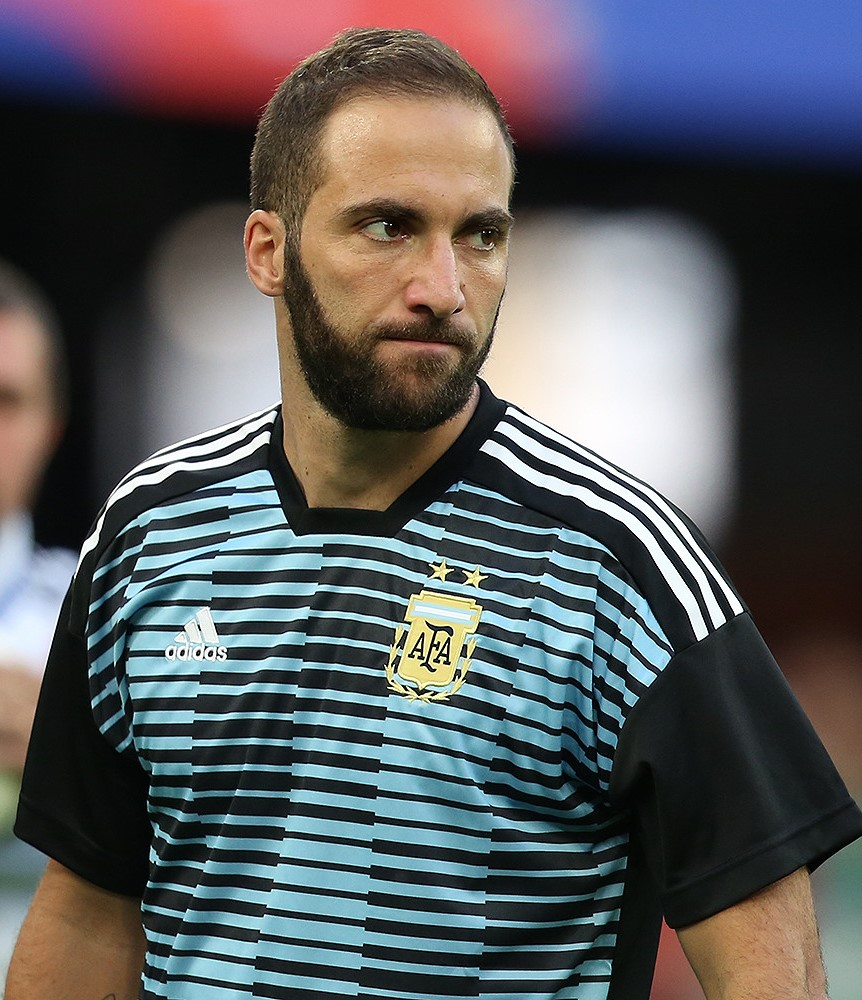
Gonzalo Higuain, of Basque heritage but not eligible to play for Athletic

Apart from the occasional anomalies, the typical stance to disregard players from the Basque diaspora contrasts with the players born in Latin America who were signed by the club such as Marcelino Gálatas, Higinio Ortúzar, Vicente Biurrun, Javier Iturriaga and Fernando Amorebieta who all did have Basque parentage, but as with the small number of players born in other parts of Spain such as Carlos Petreñas, Isaac Oceja, Makala, Armando Merodio, Patxi Ferreira, Luis Fernando, Andoni Ayarza, Teo Rastrojo, Manu Núñez, Ernesto Valverde and Robert Navarro, it was primarily their residency in the territory from a young age rather than their ancestry which made them eligible for Athletic. That was not always the case, as in the 1950s some talented players raised locally but with birthplaces elsewhere (Chus Pereda, Miguel Jones, José Eulogio Gárate and the elder brother of Manuel Sarabia) were not signed as would have been expected in later eras. It has been suggested that the inconsistent rejection of some of these foreign-born players by the club's hierarchy may have been influenced by the ruling regime which emphasised pride in all things Spanish (considering the Basques as part of this single identity), or conversely by some board members' views as Basque nationalists, opposed to Franco in their ultimate aims for their homeland but also involved in judgements on the worthiness of individuals based on their ethnic background.

=== Players born in the Basque Country ===
Conversely, players born in the Basque Country but raised elsewhere are considered eligible. In the years prior to the Spanish Civil War, Athletic undertook a project named 'Operation Return', seeking players born in the Basque region who had emigrated to other countries. One of the few who actually made a competitive appearance for the club was Nemesio Tamayo who had begun his career in his adopted homeland of Chile and also played in Mexico before a brief spell in his birthplace. The arrival of Bilbao-born Emilio Aldecoa in 1947 was unusual as he had spent the past decade of his life in England, having been evacuated as a teenage refugee of the Civil War. Another member of that refugee group was the club's star goalkeeper of the era Raimundo Pérez Lezama, although he had returned home much sooner on the outbreak of World War II; a third Basque refugee Sabino Barinaga turned down an offer from Athletic and joined Real Madrid.

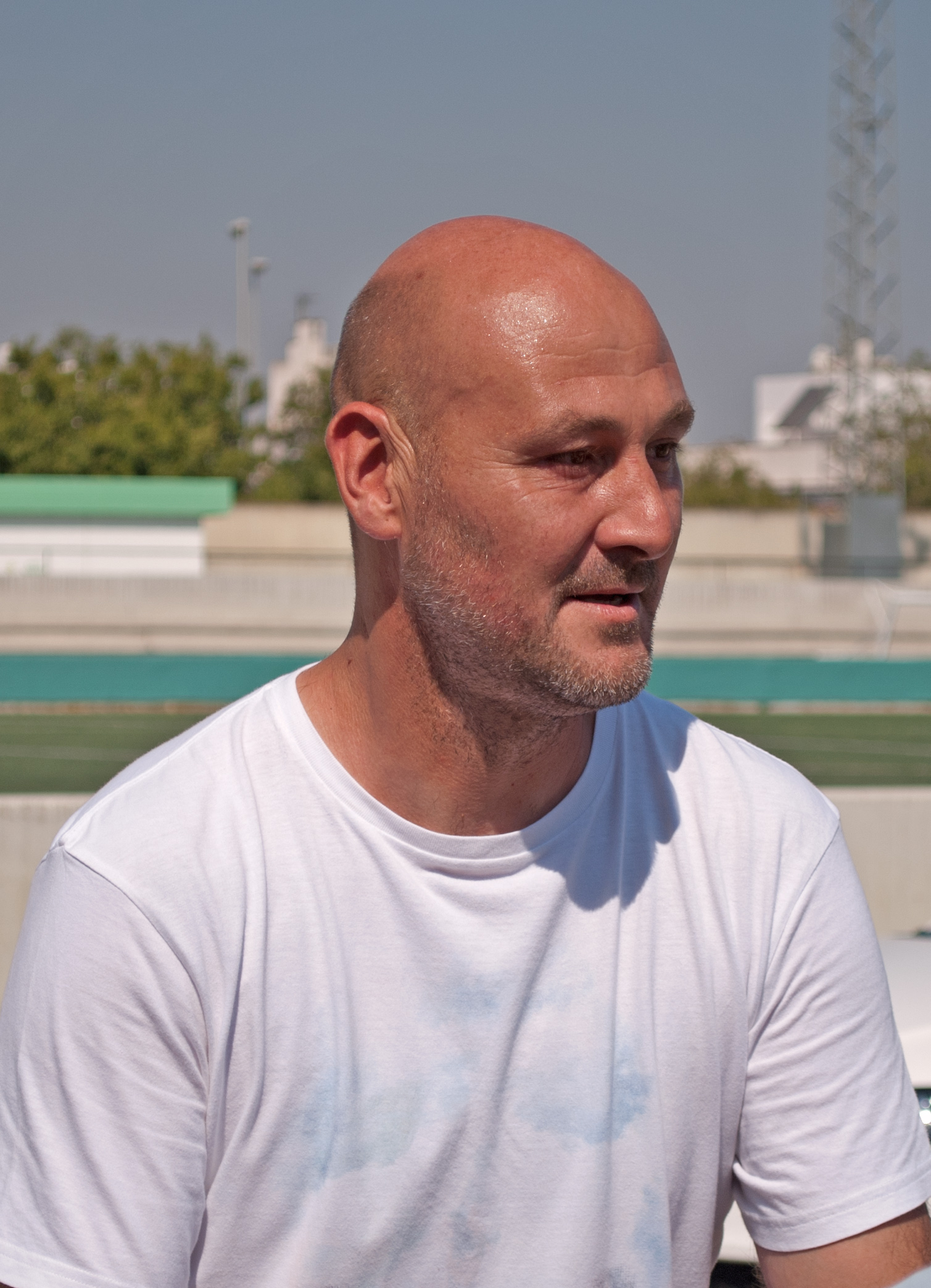
Roberto Ríos, born in Bilbao but raised and trained in Seville

Fernando Llorente was born in Pamplona but lived his whole childhood in Rincón de Soto (close to Basque territory but outside it) before he was recruited as an 11-year-old. Two of Athletic's most expensive signings, the Bilbao-born Spain internationals Roberto Ríos and Ander Herrera learned their skills in the cities where their footballing fathers were based professionally (Eusebio at Real Betis of Seville, and Pedro at Real Zaragoza respectively); Gaizka Mendieta (son of Andrés Mendieta of CD Castellón) had similar origins but turned down a move, albeit he remained a proud Basque who played for the unofficial representative team. In 2019, Athletic were reported as enquiring into the availability of young players Gonzalo Desio (the son of former Deportivo Alavés midfielder Hermes Desio, born in Vitoria-Gasteiz but raised in his parents' homeland of Argentina) and Sergio Moreno (born in Pamplona but raised in the Canary Islands and in Madrid, where he made a senior debut with Rayo Vallecano) due to their birthplaces, with no other links tying them to the club's recruitment philosophy.

=== Players from Biscay ===
It was once the case that Athletic would usually recruit from the Biscay province surrounding Bilbao while the other leading clubs Real Sociedad and Osasuna would focus on players from their respective provinces Gipuzkoa and Navarre. In recent decades (with the pool of potential players declining due to a low birth rate in the area), Athletic expanded their recruitment in these other areas in their efforts to accommodate the best players with any Basque links. This saw many talented players from San Sebastián and Pamplona join the club, and also caused Real Sociedad to abandon their own Basque policy in the face of the competition for signings.

Transfers between the clubs increased tensions with Osasuna and with Real; Athletic paid over the odds for players from those rivals on several occasions, including breaking the national record for a native player for Loren in 1989, setting further records for purchasing a teenager with Joseba Etxeberria in 1995 followed by the €6 million outlay on the untested Javi Martínez in 2006, being ordered by courts to pay €5 million for Iban Zubiaurre in 2008 after his signing was found to be a breach of contract, and meeting Iñigo Martínez's €32 million release clause in 2018 (offset by losing Aymeric Laporte the same day in a similar deal worth double that amount).

That change of focus also led to fewer players from the home province being selected; in a 2011 fixture, none of the Athletic starters or used substitutes were from Biscay. However, in subsequent years more local players made the grade, and the situation appears unlikely to occur again in the near future – 12 of the 25 players in the 2016–17 squad were born in Biscay and 14 for the 2019–20 squad, and in November 2017 a study showed that 77% of players in the academy teams hailed from the province.

=== Players from outside the region ===
On the other hand, the definitions of the philosophy are stretched occasionally to accommodate promising youngsters with little Basque connection, which does not always sit well with some of the club's followers.

Enric Saborit, originally from Catalonia, who graduated through the youth and reserve levels to reach the first team, caused questions to be asked when he signed in 2008; he had no connection with the region by birth or blood, but while already 16 years old and playing in RCD Espanyol's cantera teams, he moved to Vitoria-Gasteiz where his mother had relocated for work two years earlier. As soon as he became a resident of the territory, Saborit was deemed eligible by Athletic to play for the club. A year earlier, 16-year-old Italian goalkeeper Imanol Schiavella joined the Athletic academy on the strength of his mother being from Andoain, but he departed after two seasons. Three years later Ander Dulce, another youth player with a Basque forename and parent (Jesús Dulce, himself a professional footballer) but born and bred elsewhere – in this case much closer than Schiavella, in Logroño – was also signed, but his promising career was spoiled by serious injury.

In summer 2017, Athletic recruited Youssouf Diarra, an 18-year-old forward born in Mali who was raised in Catalonia and had spent the past two years playing for clubs in Navarre after moving there to continue his education, which the club deemed sufficient under the policy, but apparently decided the circumstances by which Ibrahima Deng, a teenage migrant from Senegal via Tenerife, came to play for Basque club SD Amorebieta did not fit the policy (Deng later joined another local professional club, SD Eibar). The previous year, Athletic had signed 16-year-old Colombia-born defender Deiby Ochoa, who lived in La Rioja and had only ever played for clubs in that region. Like Diarra, he had attended trial matches at the Lezama training centre.

However, despite having invited Ochoa to join, in October 2017 it was announced that the club's youth training camp in Oion (a village in Álava, but just a few miles from Logroño) which was opened in order to create a loophole in their own rule and 'Basque-train' youngsters living close to the region but not within it, would no longer accept players who "did not fit the Athletic philosophy", effectively disbanding the camp by excluding around 150 Riojan youngsters of various ages and leaving only around ten Basques across the squads, indicating a change in approach to youth recruitment among the club hierarchy. Past recruits born in that region, who were considered eligible due to their formative club being Osasuna or Real Sociedad, include José Mari García, Santiago Ezquerro, David López and Borja Viguera; however, the justifications for allowing Luis de la Fuente (albeit his father was from Bilbao and he was raised as an Athletic supporter) and later Daniel Aranzubia and Miguel Escalona to join Athletic's youth system directly from Riojan clubs were less clear.

In January 2018, Athletic announced a new signing who was more obviously non-Basque by ethnicity: 25-year-old Cristian Ganea, a Romanian international who was also born in that country and had only played for Romanian clubs for the past five years. But prior to that, he had spent his teenage years living in Basauri just outside Bilbao and had featured for local teams (including Basconia, Athletic's feeder team at semi-professional level who have a separate amateur and juvenile structure), meaning he too was eligible under the 'learned skills at a Basque club' aspect of the policy. A year later, the Bosnian international forward Kenan Kodro joined the club, but his Basque credentials beyond his name (born and raised in San Sebastián and a Real Sociedad youth product) were very robust. Similarly, Ewan Urain was selected by Scotland at under-21 level in 2021 due to his heritage but was born and raised in Durango, Biscay, and Efe Korkut represented Turkey at youth levels and developed in the German football system before joining the club in 2026 but was born in San Sebastián.

== Women's team ==
The Athletic Bilbao senior and reserve women's teams were established in 2002. The club won five Spanish championships in its first two decades while adhering to the Basque-only policy, benefitting from the less globalised and commercial nature of the women's game in that period – with less money available for imports, local players predominated across the league's clubs and no Barcelona–Real Madrid duopoly existed, with Los Blancos not becoming involved in the sport until 2019. Due to the shorter history of the women's branch there are fewer examples of Athletic players with partial connections to the territory, examples being the internationals Damaris Egurrola (born in Florida, raised in Gernika, later declared for the Netherlands) and Lucía García (born in Barakaldo's specialist maternity hospital as one of a set of quadruplets, raised in Asturias) as well as American goalkeeper Maite Zabala (from the large Basque community in Boise, Idaho) who did not make a competitive appearance. Mention should also be given to Manuela Lareo, of partial Afro-Caribbean (Dominican Republic) descent, who joined the club in 2010 and made her debut later that year, preceding Jonás Ramalho's first appearance for the men's team.

In summer 2019, the club made a signing which many supporters felt was a breach of their code, bringing Germany-born 1.FFC Frankfurt player Bibiane Schulze to Bilbao. As well as marrying into Spanish minor nobility, her mother's family had strong Basque ties, including great-grandfather (Patxo Belaustegigoitia) who played for Athletic a century earlier. Bibiane's personal connections to the region were frequent visits on holiday including informal 'football development' playing on the beach at Lekeitio, and being an Athletic fan as a child. The club president Aitor Elizegi addressed the media to explain the rationale behind the signing, stating she was a player of "clear Basque origin". A year later the club made its first French-Basque women's signing, Sophie Istillart (previously of Bordeaux).

== See also ==
- List of football clubs with home-grown players policy

- Rangers F.C. signing policy, a Scottish club that formerly had an unwritten rule to only sign non-Catholics
- Euskaltel–Euskadi, defunct Basque cycling team with similar rider hiring policy

- List of Athletic Bilbao players
- List of Basque footballers
