= Beñat Prados =

Spanish footballer (born 2001)

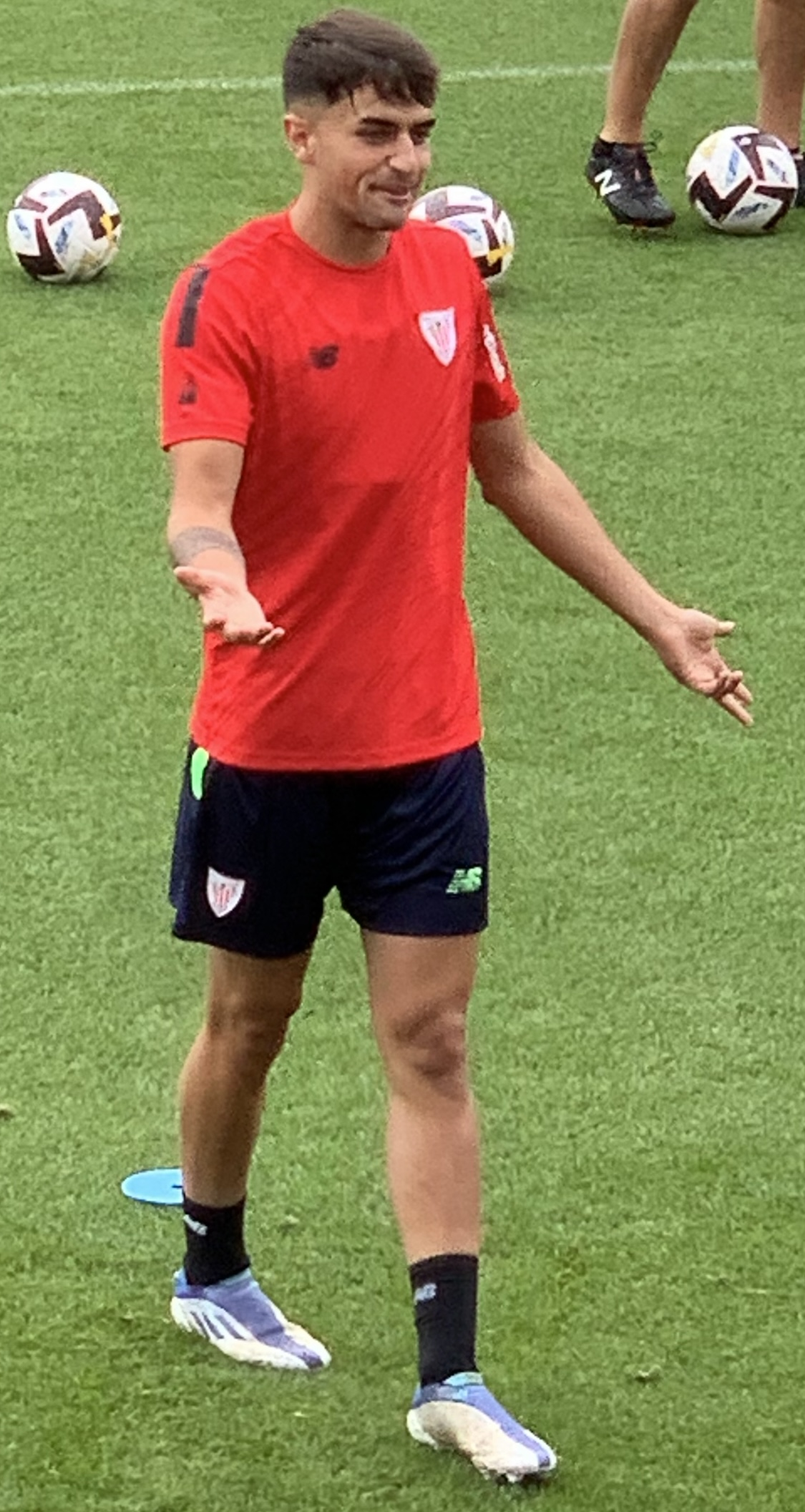
- Prados in 2022

Personal information
- Full name: Beñat Prados Díaz
- Date of birth: 8 February 2001 (age 25)
- Place of birth: Pamplona, Spain
- Height: 1.79 m (5 ft 10 in)
- Position: Midfielder

Team information
- Current team: Athletic Bilbao
- Number: 6

Youth career
- Txantrea
- 2015–2018: Athletic Bilbao

Senior career*
Years	Team	Apps	(Gls)
2018–2020	Basconia	39	(4)
2019–2022	Bilbao Athletic	69	(4)
2022–	Athletic Bilbao	59	(1)
2022–2023	→ Mirandés (loan)	39	(0)

International career^{‡}
2019	Spain U18	3	(0)
2020	Spain U19	1	(0)
2019	Spain U20	5	(0)
2026–	Basque Country	1	(0)
- * Club domestic league appearances and goals as of 16:01, 25 October 2026 (UTC) ‡ National team caps and goals as of 14 November 2026

Beñat Prados Díaz (born 8 February 2001) is a Spanish professional footballer who plays as a midfielder for Athletic Bilbao.

== Club career ==
Born in Pamplona, Navarre, Prados joined Athletic Bilbao's youth setup in July 2015, from UDC Txantrea. He made his senior debut with the farm team during the 2018–19 season, in Tercera División.

Prados made his debut with the reserves on 26 October 2019, coming on as a late substitute for Oihan Sancet in a 4–1 Segunda División B home routing of Real Valladolid Promesas. Definitely promoted to the B-side in June 2020, he subsequently became a regular starter for the team, playing in 25 matches (play-offs included) of the 2020–21 campaign, scoring once in a 3–2 away success over SD Amorebieta on 6 February 2021.

On 14 May 2021, Prados renewed his contract until 2025. In June, he was called up by manager Marcelino to make the pre-season with the main squad.

On 14 July 2022, Prados moved on loan to Segunda División side CD Mirandés for the season. He made his professional debut on 13 August, starting in a 1–1 home draw against Sporting de Gijón.

On 19 August 2023, he made his La Liga debut for Athletic in his hometown of Pamplona at El Sadar against Osasuna, replacing Imanol in a 2–0 victory. On 1 September, after the departure of Javier Martón, he was registered in the first team squad with the number '24'. After a few months in which he occasionally filled in as a right-back or center-back, in December he made a place for himself in the centre of midfield, with several impressive displays.

In September 2025 he suffered an injury to the anterior cruciate ligament of his left knee during a training session, undergoing a successful operation but being ruled out for the entire club season. Having recuperated, he was assigned squad number '6' for the 2026–27 Athletic Bilbao season after the departure of Mikel Vesga but then missed the start of the campaign with a minor muscle injury.

== International career ==
He was an international in various youth categories of the Spanish national team. In 2017, he attended a friendly tournament with the under-16 team coached by Santi Denia. He was also an under-18, under-19 and under-20 international.

== Career statistics ==
As of match played 25 October 2026

Appearances and goals by club, season and competition
Club	Season	League			Copa del Rey		Continental		Other		Total	
Club	Season	Division	Apps	Goals	Apps	Goals	Apps	Goals	Apps	Goals	Apps	Goals
Basconia	2018–19	Tercera División	24	3	0	0	—		—		24	3
Basconia	2019–20	Tercera División	15	1	0	0	—		—		15	1
Basconia	Total		39	4	0	0	—		0	0	39	4
Athletic Bilbao B	2019–20	Segunda División B	13	0	—		—		1 (Note: Appearance(s) in Segunda División B play-offs)	0	14	0
Athletic Bilbao B	2020–21	Segunda División B	23	1	—		—		2	0	25	1
Athletic Bilbao B	2021–22	Primera División RFEF	33	3	—		—		—		33	3
Athletic Bilbao B	2022–23	Primera Federación	0	0	—		—		—		0	0
Athletic Bilbao B	Total		69	4	0	0	—		3	0	72	4
Mirandés (loan)	2022–23	Segunda División	39	0	2	0	—		—		41	0
Athletic Bilbao	2023–24	La Liga	26	0	7	0	—		—		33	0
Athletic Bilbao	2024–25	La Liga	30	1	1	0	12 (Note: Appearances in UEFA Europa League)	1	1 (Note: Appearance in Supercopa de España)	0	44	2
Athletic Bilbao	2025–26	La Liga	2	0	0	0	0	0	0	0	2	0
Athletic Bilbao	2026–27	La Liga	1	0	0	0	—		—		1	0
Athletic Bilbao	Total		59	1	8	0	12	1	1	0	80	2
Career total			206	9	10	0	12	1	4	0	232	10

== Honours ==
Athletic Bilbao

- Copa del Rey: 2023–24
