= Mikel Jauregizar =

Spanish footballer (born 2003)

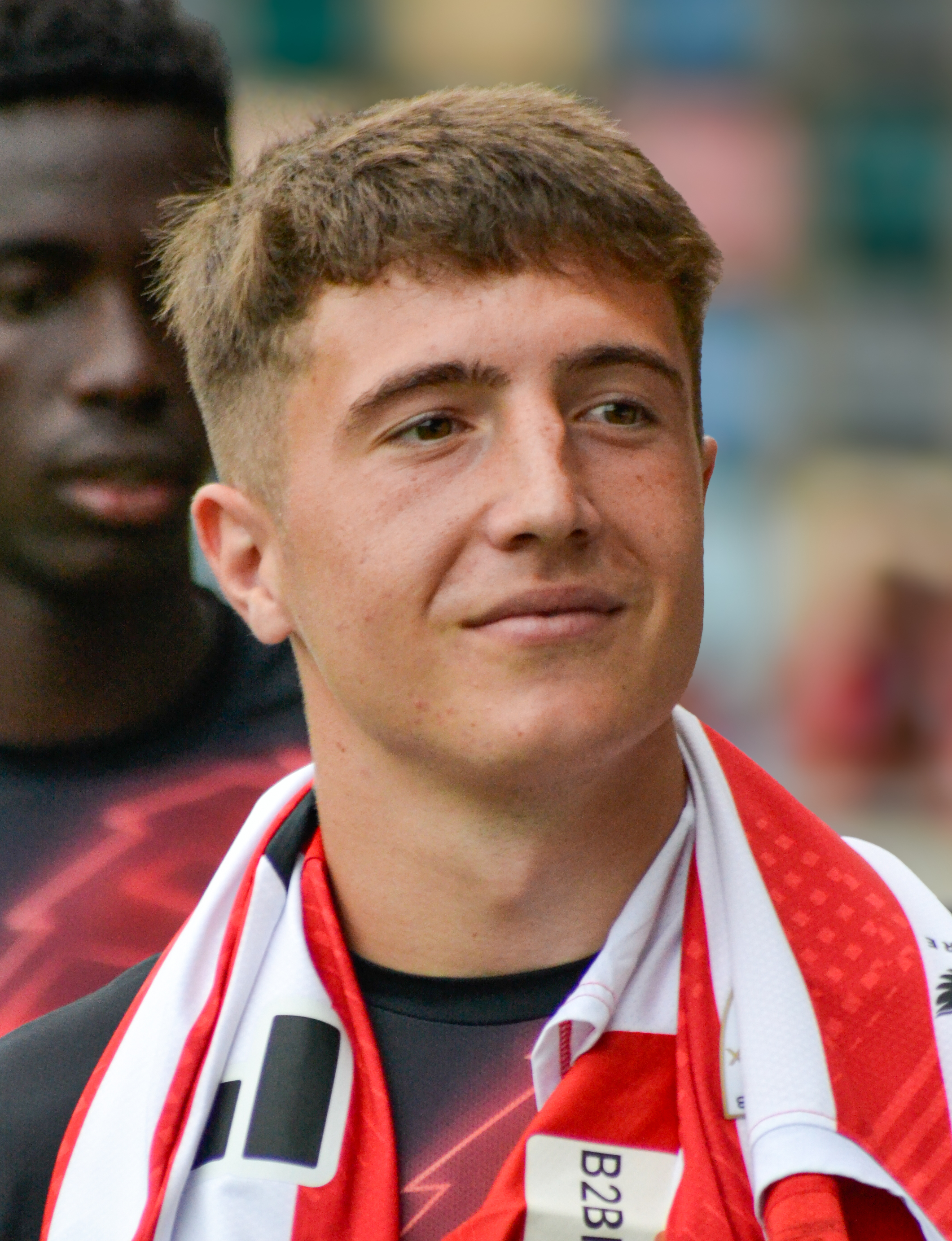
- Jauregizar with Athletic Bilbao in 2025

Personal information
- Full name: Mikel Jauregizar Alboniga
- Date of birth: 13 November 2003 (age 23)
- Place of birth: Bermeo, Spain
- Height: 1.77 m (5 ft 10 in)
- Position: Midfielder

Team information
- Current team: Athletic Bilbao
- Number: 18

Youth career
- Bermeo
- 2021–2022: Athletic Bilbao

Senior career*
| Years | Team | Apps | (Gls) |
| 2019–2021 | Bermeo | 1 | (0) |
| 2022–2023 | Basconia | 29 | (3) |
| 2023–2024 | Bilbao Athletic | 15 | (1) |
| 2023– | Athletic Bilbao | 81 | (4) |

International career^{‡}
| 2024– | Spain U21 | 8 | (1) |
| 2025– | Basque Country | 2 | (1) |
- * Club domestic league appearances and goals as of 17 October 2026 ‡ National team caps and goals as of 15 November 2025

Mikel Jauregizar Alboniga (born 13 November 2003) is a Spanish professional footballer who plays as a midfielder for La Liga club Athletic Bilbao.

== Career ==
Jauregizar began his career with hometown club Bermeo, making a single appearance for their senior team in 2019 at the age of 15. He moved to Athletic Bilbao's youth academy on 1 April 2021. In 2022, he started playing with their third team Basconia. He was promoted to the second team, Bilbao Athletic, for the 2023–24 season. In October 2023, he began training with the senior Athletic Bilbao squad after injuries to some of their regulars. On 20 November 2023, he extended his contract with the club until 2028.

Jauregizar made his professional debut for Athletic Bilbao as a substitute (replacing his friend and fellow former Bermeo player Unai Gómez) in a 3–0 Copa del Rey win over Cayón on 7 December 2023. Nine days later, he again came off the bench for his debut in La Liga, a 2–0 home victory over Atlético Madrid.

After establishing himself as an important member of the team in 2024–25, he was assigned the '18' squad number, only worn by significant figures Bittor Alkiza, Carlos Gurpegui and the retiring Óscar de Marcos in the previous three decades.

== International career ==
Jaurezigar was called up to the Basque Country national team for a friendly match against Palestine on 15 November 2025.

== Career statistics ==
As of match played 17 October 2026

Appearances and goals by club, season and competition
| Club | Season | League | | | Copa del Rey | | Europe | | Other | | Total | |
| Club | Season | Division | Apps | Goals | Apps | Goals | Apps | Goals | Apps | Goals | Apps | Goals |
|---|---|---|---|---|---|---|---|---|---|---|---|---|
| Bermeo | 2019–20 | Tercera División | 1 | 0 | — | | — | | — | | 1 | 0 |
| Basconia | 2022–23 | Tercera Federación | 29 | 3 | — | | — | | 2 (Note: Appearances in Tercera Federación play-offs) | 0 | 31 | 3 |
| Athletic Bilbao B | 2022–23 | Primera Federación | 1 | 0 | — | | — | | — | | 1 | 0 |
| Athletic Bilbao B | 2023–24 | Segunda Federación | 14 | 1 | — | | — | | — | | 14 | 1 |
| Athletic Bilbao B | Total | | 15 | 1 | — | | — | | — | | 15 | 1 |
| Athletic Bilbao | 2023–24 | La Liga | 7 | 0 | 3 | 0 | — | | — | | 10 | 0 |
| Athletic Bilbao | 2024–25 | La Liga | 34 | 2 | 2 | 0 | 11 (Note: Appearances in UEFA Europa League) | 1 | 1 (Note: Appearance in Supercopa de España) | 0 | 48 | 3 |
| Athletic Bilbao | 2025–26 | La Liga | 34 | 2 | 5 | 1 | 7 (Note: Appearances in UEFA Champions League) | 0 | 1 | 0 | 47 | 3 |
| Athletic Bilbao | 2026–27 | La Liga | 6 | 0 | 0 | 0 | — | | — | | 6 | 0 |
| Athletic Bilbao | Total | | 81 | 4 | 10 | 1 | 17 | 1 | 2 | 0 | 111 | 6 |
| Career total | | | 126 | 8 | 10 | 1 | 17 | 1 | 4 | 0 | 158 | 10 |

== Honours ==
Bilbao Athletic

- Segunda Federación (Group 2): 2023–24

Athletic Bilbao

- Copa del Rey: 2023–24
