= Endika Buján =

Spanish footballer (born 2004)

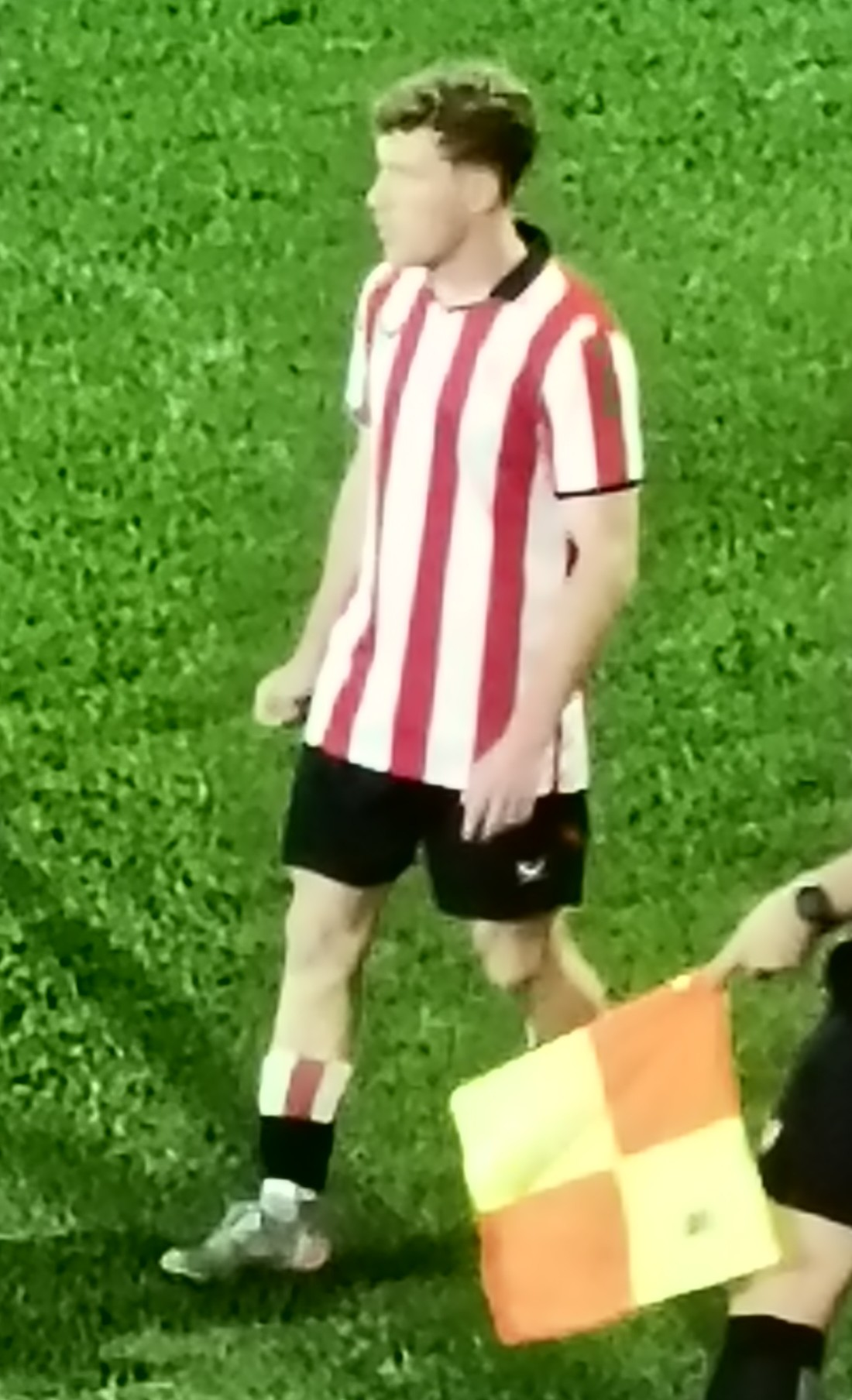
- Buján playing for Bilbao Athletic in 2025

Personal information
- Full name: Endika Buján de Rueda
- Date of birth: 16 January 2003 (age 23)
- Place of birth: Barakaldo, Spain
- Height: 1.70 m (5 ft 7 in)
- Position: Winger

Team information
- Current team: Bilbao Athletic
- Number: 11

Youth career
- 2011–2015: Barakaldo
- 2015–2022: Danok Bat

Senior career*
Years	Team	Apps	(Gls)
2022–2024	Barakaldo	59	(11)
2024–	Bilbao Athletic	47	(3)
2025–	Athletic Bilbao	1	(0)
- * Club domestic league appearances and goals as of 9 June 2026

Endika Buján de Rueda (born 16 January 2003) is a Spanish professional footballer who plays for Bilbao Athletic as a winger.

== Career ==
Buján began playing football with the academy of Barakaldo in 2011, before moving to Danok Bat in 2015 where he finished his development. He returned to Barakaldo in on 23 June 2022 and was promoted to their first team competing in the Tercera Federación. He helped them earn two consecutive promotions from the Tercera Federación to the Primera Federación, with 11 goals in 60 matches.

On 1 February 2024, it was announced that Buján would sign with Athletic Bilbao, and he was assigned to their B-team. In October 2024, he suffered a fracture in his back that left him off the field for a couple of months. On 8 February 2025, he debuted with the Athletic senior team as a substitute in a 3–0 La Liga win over Girona (Maroan Sannadi, a new signing and fellow former Barakaldo player, doing likewise).

== Playing style ==
Buján is a fast, left-footed winger who can play on both sides of the pitch and in the midfield.

== Personal life ==
Endika's elder cousin Unai is also a professional footballer, who replaced him in the Barakaldo squad in 2024.

== Career statistics ==
As of match played 8 February 2025

Appearances and goals by club, season and competition
Club	Season	League			Cup		Europe		Other		Total	
Club	Season	Division	Apps	Goals	Apps	Goals	Apps	Goals	Apps	Goals	Apps	Goals
Barakaldo	2022–23	Tercera Federación	25	5	—		—		—		25	5
Barakaldo	2023–24	Segunda Federación	34	6	1	0	—		—		35	6
Barakaldo	Total		59	1	1	0	—		—		60	1
Bilbao Athletic	2024–25	Primera Federación	15	2	—		—		—		15	2
Athletic Bilbao	2024–25	La Liga	1	0	—		0	0	—		1	0
Career total			75	13	1	0	0	0	0	0	76	13
