= 2024–25 Athletic Bilbao season =

Athletic Bilbao
2024–25 season
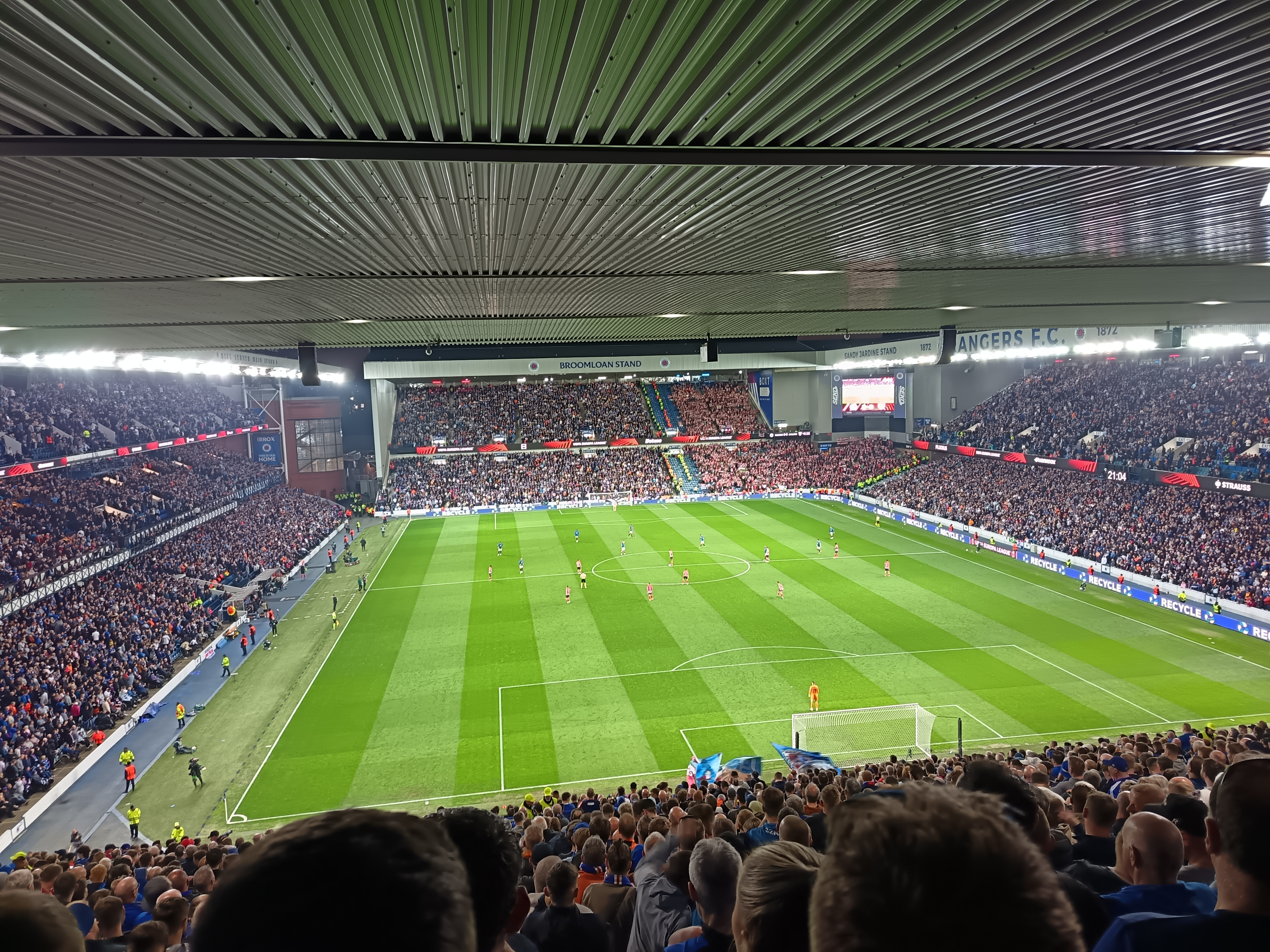
- Rangers vs Athletic at Ibrox, April 2025
- President: Jon Uriarte
- Head coach: Ernesto Valverde
- Stadium: San Mamés
- La Liga: 4th
- Copa del Rey: Round of 16
- Supercopa de España: Semi-finals
- UEFA Europa League: Semi-finals
- Top goalscorer: League: Oihan Sancet (15); All: Oihan Sancet (17)
- Average home league attendance: 48,420
Home colours	Away colours	Third colours

The 2024–25 season was the 127th season in the history of Athletic Bilbao, and the club's 94th consecutive season in La Liga. In addition to the domestic league, the club also participated in the Copa del Rey, the Supercopa de España (after winning the 2023–24 Copa del Rey), and the UEFA Europa League (competing in Europe for the first time in seven years).

Following a 2–0 victory over Getafe in the 36th round of La Liga, Athletic Bilbao successfully qualified for the UEFA Champions League for the first time since the 2014–15 season.

== Summary ==
On 13 June, midfielder Ander Herrera had his contract renewed until the year 2025.

== Players ==
=== First-team squad ===
As of 2 February 2025

Note: Flags indicate national team as defined under FIFA eligibility rules; some limited exceptions apply. Players may hold more than one non-FIFA nationality.

No.	Pos.	Nation	Player
1	GK	ESP	Unai Simón
2	DF	ESP	Andoni Gorosabel
3	DF	ESP	Dani Vivian
4	DF	ESP	Aitor Paredes
5	DF	ESP	Yeray Álvarez
6	MF	ESP	Mikel Vesga
7	FW	ESP	Álex Berenguer
8	MF	ESP	Oihan Sancet
9	FW	GHA	Iñaki Williams (vice-captain)
10	FW	ESP	Nico Williams
11	FW	GBS	Álvaro Djaló
12	FW	ESP	Gorka Guruzeta
13	GK	ESP	Julen Agirrezabala

No.	Pos.	Nation	Player
14	DF	ESP	Unai Nuñez (on loan from Celta Vigo)
15	DF	ESP	Iñigo Lekue
16	MF	ESP	Iñigo Ruiz de Galarreta
17	DF	ESP	Yuri Berchiche
18	DF	ESP	Óscar de Marcos (captain)
20	MF	ESP	Unai Gómez
21	FW	MAR	Maroan Sannadi
23	MF	ESP	Mikel Jauregizar
24	MF	ESP	Beñat Prados
28	MF	ESP	Peio Canales
32	DF	ESP	Adama Boiro

== Transfers ==
=== In ===
Pos.	Player	Transferred from	Fee	Date	Source
FW	(Spain) Javier Martón	(Spain) Mirandés	Loan return	30 June 2024	
MF	(Spain) Jon Morcillo	(Spain) Amorebieta	Loan return	30 June 2024	
MF	(Spain) Nico Serrano	(Spain) Racing Ferrol	Loan return	30 June 2024	
MF	(Spain) Juan Artola	(Spain) Alcorcón	Loan return	30 June 2024	
MF	(Guinea-Bissau) Álvaro Djaló	(Portugal) Braga	€15,000,000	1 July 2024	
DF	(Spain) Andoni Gorosabel	(Spain) Alavés	Free	1 July 2024	
DF	(Spain) Unai Nuñez	(Spain) Celta de Vigo	Loan	28 August 2024	
FW	(Morocco) Maroan Sannadi	(Spain) Alavés	€3,000,000	1 February 2025	

=== Out ===
Pos.	Player	Transferred to	Fee	Date	Source
DF	(Spain) Unai Núñez	(Spain) Celta Vigo	€10,000,000	1 July 2024	
MF	(Spain) Raúl García	Retired	N/A	1 July 2024	
MF	(Spain) Iker Muniain	(Argentina) San Lorenzo	End of contract	1 July 2024	
MF	(Spain) Jon Morcillo	(Spain) Albacete	End of contract	1 July 2024	
MF	(Spain) Dani García	(Greece) Olympiacos	End of contract	1 July 2024	
MF	(Spain) Unai Vencedor	(Spain) Racing Santander	Loan	10 July 2024	
FW	(Spain) Asier Villalibre	(Spain) Alavés	Undisclosed	15 July 2024	
DF	(Spain) Imanol	(Czech Republic) Sparta Prague	Undisclosed	16 July 2024	
FW	(Spain) Juan Artola	(Spain) Cultural Leonesa	Released	2 August 2024	
FW	(Spain) Urko Izeta	(Spain) Mirandés	Loan	8 August 2024	
DF	(Spain) Hugo Rincón	(Spain) Mirandés	Loan	11 August 2024	
DF	(Spain) Unai Egiluz	(Spain) Mirandés	Loan	29 August 2024	
FW	(Spain) Malcom Adu Ares	(Spain) Zaragoza	Loan	30 August 2024	
GK	(Mexico) Alex Padilla	(Mexico) Pumas UNAM	Loan	9 January 2025	
MF	(Spain) Ander Herrera	(Argentina) Boca Juniors	Released	17 January 2025	
MF	(Spain) Nico Serrano	(Spain) Sporting de Gijón	Loan	31 January 2025	
FW	(Spain) Javier Martón	(Spain) Albacete	Loan	3 February 2025	

=== New contracts ===
Position	Player	Date	Until	Ref.
DF	(Spain) Yuri Berchiche	4 April 2025	30 June 2026	

== Friendlies ==
=== Pre-season ===
20 July 2024 Friendly	Burgos (Spain)	2–1	(Spain) Athletic Bilbao	Burgos
19:00 CEST (UTC+2)	Berchiche 1' (o.g.); Miguel 51'	Report	Martón 53'	Stadium: Estadio El Plantío; Attendance: 8,000; Referee: Adrián Cordero Vega

24 July 2024 Friendly	Athletic Bilbao (Spain)	2–1	(Spain) Racing Santander	Barakaldo
18:30 CEST (UTC+2)	I. Williams 39'; Canales 46'	Report	Moreno (yellow card) 41'; Cabanzón 69'	Stadium: Estadio de Lasesarre; Referee: Gorka Etayo Herrera

27 July 2024 Troféu Cinco Violinos	Sporting CP (Portugal)	3–0	(Spain) Athletic Bilbao	Lisbon, Portugal
19:30 WEST (UTC+1)	Gonçalves 10'; Gyökeres (yellow card) 25'; Edwards 80'; Trincão 83'	Report	Jauregizar (yellow card) 16'	Stadium: Estádio José Alvalade; Referee: Tiago Martins (Portugal)

1 August 2024 Friendly	Athletic Bilbao (Spain)	1–0	(Spain) Eibar	Sestao
19:00 CEST (UTC+2)	Djaló 85'	Report	Alkain (yellow card) 76'	Stadium: Estadio Las Llanas; Referee: Aimar Velasco Arbaiza

3 August 2024 Euskal Txapela	Athletic Bilbao (Spain)	2–1	(Spain) Osasuna	Barakaldo
20:30 CEST (UTC+2)	Djaló 19'; Berchiche (yellow card) 57'; I. Williams 65'	Report	Ru. García 26'; Peña (yellow card) 57'	Stadium: Estadio de Lasesarre; Referee: Olatz Rivera Olmedo

7 August 2024 Friendly	Aston Villa (England)	3–2	(Spain) Athletic Bilbao	Walsall, England
19:30 BST (UTC+1)	Ramsey 4'; Philogene 60'; Archer 88'	Report	Yeray 25'; Guruzeta 71'	Stadium: Bescot Stadium; Attendance: 9,227; Referee: Robert Jones (England)

10 August 2024 Friendly	VfB Stuttgart (Germany)	4–0	(Spain) Athletic Bilbao	Stuttgart, Germany
15:30 CEST (UTC+2)	Silas 11', 49'; Demirović 14'; Woltemade 79'	Report	Herrera (yellow card) 15'	Stadium: MHPArena; Attendance: 50,000; Referee: Daniel Schlager (Germany)

== Competitions ==
=== Overall record ===
Competition	First match	Last match	Starting round	Final position	Record							
Competition	First match	Last match	Starting round	Final position	Pld	W	D	L	GF	GA	GD	Win %
La Liga	15 August 2024	25 May 2025	Matchday 1	4th	38	19	13	6	54	29	+25	50.00
Copa del Rey	4 January 2025	16 January 2025	Round of 32	Round of 16	2	0	1	1	2	3	−1	0.00
Supercopa de España	8 January 2025		Semi-finals	Semi-finals	1	0	0	1	0	2	−2	0.00
UEFA Europa League	26 September 2024	8 May 2025	League phase	Semi-finals	14	8	2	4	22	17	+5	57.14
Total					55	27	16	12	78	51	+27	49.09

Source: Soccerway

=== La Liga ===
==== League table ====
Pos	Team	Pld	W	D	L	GF	GA	GD	Pts	Qualification or relegation
2	Real Madrid	38	26	6	6	78	38	+40	84	Qualification for the Champions League league stage (Note: La Liga gained an additional Champions League place as a result of Spain gaining one of the two European Performance Spots (EPS) awarded to the two associations with the highest UEFA coefficient points in 2024–25.)
3	Atlético Madrid	38	22	10	6	68	30	+38	76	Qualification for the Champions League league stage
4	Athletic Bilbao	38	19	13	6	54	29	+25	70 (Note: Athletic Bilbao finished ahead of Villarreal on head-to-head points: Athletic Bilbao 2–0 Villarreal, Villarreal 0–0 Athletic Bilbao.)	Qualification for the Champions League league stage
5	Villarreal	38	20	10	8	71	51	+20	70	Qualification for the Champions League league stage
6	Real Betis	38	16	12	10	57	50	+7	60	Qualification for the Europa League league stage (Note: The 2024–25 Copa del Rey winner qualified for the Europa League league stage. Since the cup winners (Barcelona) qualified based on league position, the Europa League spot was passed to the seventh-placed team, and the Conference League spot was passed to the eighth-placed team.)

Source: LaLiga EA Sports
Rules for classification: 1) Points; 2) Head-to-head points; 3) Head-to-head goal difference; 4) Goal difference; 5) Goals scored; 6) Fair-play points
(Note: Head-to-head record is used only after all the matches between the teams in question have been played)

==== Results summary ====
Overall								Home						Away					
Pld	W	D	L	GF	GA	GD	Pts	W	D	L	GF	GA	GD	W	D	L	GF	GA	GD
38	19	13	6	54	29	+25	70	11	6	2	32	13	+19	8	7	4	22	16	+6

Source: La Liga

==== Results by round ====
Round	1	2	3	4	5	7^{1}	6	8	9	10	11	12	13	14	15	19^{2}	16	17	18	20	21	22	23	24	25	26	27	28	29	30	31	32	33	34	35	36	37	38
Ground	H	A	H	H	A	A	H	H	A	H	A	H	A	H	A	H	H	A	A	A	H	A	H	A	H	A	H	A	H	A	H	A	H	A	H	A	A	H
Result	D	L	W	L	W	W	W	D	L	W	D	D	D	W	W	W	W	D	W	W	D	D	W	D	W	L	D	W	D	D	W	L	W	D	W	W	W	L
Position	9	15	8	12	9	5	3	5	6	5	5	6	6	5	4	4	4	4	4	4	4	4	4	4	4	4	4	4	4	4	4	4	4	4	4	4	4	4

Source: La Liga
A = Away; H = Home; W = Win; D = Draw; L = Loss

^{1} Matchday 7 (vs Leganés) was brought forward due to Athletic Bilbao's participation in the UEFA Europa League league phase.
^{2} Matchday 19 (vs Real Madrid) was brought forward due to both clubs' participation in the Supercopa de España.

==== Matches ====
The league schedule was released on 18 June 2024.

15 August 2024 1	Athletic Bilbao	1–1	Getafe	Bilbao
19:00 CEST (UTC+2)	Sancet 27'; Prados (yellow card) 55'; Gómez (yellow card) 70'; Gorosabel (yellow card) 73'; Herrera (yellow card) 86'	Report	Uche (yellow card) 45+8', (goal) 64'	Stadium: San Mamés; Attendance: 47,845; Referee: Alejandro Muñiz Ruiz

24 August 2024 2	Barcelona	2–1	Athletic Bilbao	Barcelona
19:00 CEST (UTC+2)	Yamal 24'; Cubarsí (yellow card) 41'; Bernal (yellow card) 49'; Lewandowski 75', (yellow card) 85'; López (yellow card) 90+6'	Report	Yeray (yellow card) 38'; Sancet 42' (pen.); Berenguer (yellow card) 56'; Lekue (yellow card) 87'; Herrera (yellow card) 90+6'; Jauregizar (yellow card) 90+6'	Stadium: Estadi Olímpic Lluís Companys; Attendance: 46,448; Referee: Jesús Gil Manzano

28 August 2024 3	Athletic Bilbao	1–0	Valencia	Bilbao
19:00 CEST (UTC+2)	Prados 45', (yellow card) 69'	Report	Mir (yellow card) 23'; Mosquera (yellow card) 26'; Foulquier (yellow card) 90+3'	Stadium: San Mamés; Attendance: 48,644; Referee: Pablo González Fuertes

31 August 2024 4	Athletic Bilbao	0–1	Atlético Madrid	Bilbao
19:00 CEST (UTC+2)	N. Williams (yellow card) 15'; Yeray (yellow card) 34'; Sancet (yellow card) 35'	Report	Koke (yellow card) 85'; Correa 90+2'	Stadium: San Mamés; Attendance: 48,617; Referee: Alejandro Hernández Hernández

15 September 2024 5	Las Palmas	2–3	Athletic Bilbao	Las Palmas
17:30 WEST (UTC+1)	Suárez (yellow card) 27'; Sandro 58'; Muñoz 83'	Report	Sancet 7'; Jauregizar (yellow card) 22' (yellow-red card) 56'; N. Williams 30'; Ruiz de Galarreta (yellow card) 45+2'; Paredes 76'	Stadium: Gran Canaria; Attendance: 25,908; Referee: Miguel Ángel Ortiz Arias

19 September 2024 7	Leganés	0–2	Athletic Bilbao	Leganés
19:00 CEST (UTC+2)	Miguel (yellow card) 41'; Rosier (yellow card) 63'; Tapia (yellow card) 90'	Report	Vivian 65'; I. Williams 76'	Stadium: Butarque; Attendance: 8,304; Referee: Francisco José Hernández Maeso
Note: The match was brought forward due to Athletic Bilbao's participation in the UEFA Europa League league phase.

22 September 2024 6	Athletic Bilbao	3–1	Celta Vigo	Bilbao
16:15 CEST (UTC+2)	Guruzeta 4', 39'; Berenguer (yellow card) 20'; Paredes (yellow card) 30'; Prados (yellow card) 52'; Djaló 80'	Report	Aspas 25' (pen.); Sotelo (yellow card) 50'; Moriba (yellow card) 86'	Stadium: San Mamés; Attendance: 48,737; Referee: José María Sánchez Martínez

29 September 2024 8	Athletic Bilbao	1–1	Sevilla	Bilbao
16:15 CEST (UTC+2)	Jauregizar 36'; Agirrezabala (red card) 82'	Report	Carmona (yellow card) 55'; Padilla 90+3' (o.g.); Nianzou (yellow card) 90+6'; Pedrosa (yellow card) 90+7'	Stadium: San Mamés; Attendance: 48,288; Referee: César Soto Grado

6 October 2024 9	Girona	2–1	Athletic Bilbao	Girona
14:00 CEST (UTC+2)	Krejčí (yellow card) 31'; Asprilla 39'; Gazzaniga (yellow card) 56'; D. López (yellow card) 57'; Herrera (yellow card) 90+1'; Stuani 90+9' (pen.)	Report	Berenguer (penalty missed) 28'; Sancet 41'; Vivian (yellow card) 45+3'; Herrera (penalty missed) 58'; Paredes (yellow card) 90+7' (yellow-red card) 90+8'	Stadium: Montilivi; Attendance: 13,396; Referee: Juan Luis Pulido Santana

19 October 2024 10	Athletic Bilbao	4–1	Espanyol	Bilbao
14:00 CEST (UTC+2)	Vivian 6'; I. Williams 28', 30'; Nuñez (yellow card) 48'; Berchiche (yellow card) 45+3'; Berenguer 55'	Report	Milla (yellow card) 51'; Cabrera (yellow card) 74'; El Hilali (yellow card) 82'; Tejero 90+2'	Stadium: San Mamés; Attendance: 46,713; Referee: Mateo Busquets Ferrer

28 October 2024 11	Mallorca	0–0	Athletic Bilbao	Palma
21:00 CET (UTC+1)	Costa (yellow card) 10' (yellow-red card) 23'; Mojica (yellow card) 23'; Larin (yellow card) 25'; Muriqi (yellow card) 37'	Report	Paredes (yellow card) 17'	Stadium: Mallorca Son Moix; Attendance: 19,797; Referee: Juan Martínez Munuera

3 November 2024 12	Athletic Bilbao	1–1	Real Betis	Bilbao
21:00 CET (UTC+1)	Berenguer 68'	Report	Fornals 52'	Stadium: San Mamés; Attendance: 46,898; Referee: Javier Alberola Rojas

10 November 2024 13	Valladolid	1–1	Athletic Bilbao	Valladolid
18:30 CET (UTC+1)	Anuar (yellow card) 19'; Torres (yellow card) 72'; Martín (yellow card) 78'; Moro 79'; Cömert (yellow card) 90'	Report	Jauregizar (yellow card) 26'; Prados (yellow card) 43'; Vesga (yellow card) 66'; Martón (yellow card) 90'; Guruzeta 90+4'	Stadium: José Zorrilla; Attendance: 23,515; Referee: Adrián Cordero Vega

24 November 2024 14	Athletic Bilbao	1–0	Real Sociedad	Bilbao
21:00 CET (UTC+1)	Sancet 26'; Prados (yellow card) 41'; Ruiz de Galarreta (yellow card) 76'; Berchiche (yellow card) 90+2'	Report	Zubeldia (yellow card) 21'; López (yellow card) 53'; Aguerd (yellow card) 90+1'; Sučić (yellow card) 90+5'	Stadium: San Mamés; Attendance: 50,719; Referee: Jesús Gil Manzano

1 December 2024 15	Rayo Vallecano	1–2	Athletic Bilbao	Madrid
18:30 CET (UTC+1)	Nteka 14'; Ciss (yellow card) 69'; Gumbau (yellow card) 76'; García (yellow card) 90+5'	Report	Sancet 65', 78'	Stadium: Vallecas; Attendance: 13,639; Referee: Mario Melero López

4 December 2024 19	Athletic Bilbao	2–1	Real Madrid	Bilbao
21:00 CET (UTC+1)	Berenguer 53'; Agirrezabala (yellow card) 67'; Ruiz de Galarreta (yellow card) 74'; Guruzeta 80', (yellow card) 90+3'	Report	Mbappé (penalty missed) 68'; Tchouaméni (yellow card) 70'; Vázquez (yellow card) 72'; Bellingham 78', (yellow card) 90+1'	Stadium: San Mamés; Attendance: 51,364; Referee: José María Sánchez Martínez
Note: The match was brought forward due to both clubs' participation in the Supercopa de España.

8 December 2024 16	Athletic Bilbao	2–0	Villarreal	Bilbao
16:15 CET (UTC+1)	Paredes 15'; Sancet (yellow card) 55'; Prados (yellow card) 68'; I. Williams 69'	Report	Comesaña (yellow card) 35'	Stadium: San Mamés; Attendance: 47,203; Referee: Víctor García Verdura

15 December 2024 17	Alavés	1–1	Athletic Bilbao	Vitoria-Gasteiz
16:15 CET (UTC+1)	Blanco (yellow card) 54'; Jordán 67'; Tenaglia (yellow card) 69'	Report	Gómez 10'; Boiro (yellow card) 20'; Berchiche (yellow card) 75'	Stadium: Mendizorrotza; Attendance: 19,239; Referee: José María Sánchez Martínez

21 December 2024 18	Osasuna	1–2	Athletic Bilbao	Pamplona
18:30 CET (UTC+1)	Torró 25'	Report	Guruzeta 31', (yellow card) 87'; Berenguer 74'	Stadium: El Sadar; Attendance: 22,030; Referee: Alejandro Quintero González

19 January 2025 20	Celta Vigo	1–2	Athletic Bilbao	Vigo
14:00 CET (UTC+1)	Moriba (yellow card) 60'; Álvarez 74'; Mingueza (red card) 90+6'	Report	Berenguer 62'; Vivian 71'	Stadium: Balaídos; Attendance: 22,279; Referee: Miguel Ángel Ortiz Arias

26 January 2025 21	Athletic Bilbao	0–0	Leganés	Bilbao
18:30 CET (UTC+1)	Jauregizar (yellow card) 22'	Report	Altimira (yellow card) 28'	Stadium: San Mamés; Attendance: 47,612; Referee: Alejandro Hernández Hernández

2 February 2025 22	Real Betis	2–2	Athletic Bilbao	Seville
21:00 CET (UTC+1)	Isco 15', (yellow card) 49'; Perraud 45+2'; Bakambu (yellow card) 61'; Roca (yellow card) 90+2'	Report	Paredes 33'; Sancet 69', (yellow card) 77'	Stadium: Benito Villamarín; Attendance: 49,292; Referee: Juan Martínez Munuera

8 February 2025 23	Athletic Bilbao	3–0	Girona	Bilbao
16:15 CET (UTC+1)	Sancet 42' (pen.), 45+1', 79'	Report	Gil (yellow card) 63'; Juanpe (yellow card) 71'; Herrera (yellow card) 74'; Krejčí (yellow card) 88'	Stadium: San Mamés; Attendance: 48,261; Referee: José María Sánchez Martínez

16 February 2025 24	Espanyol	1–1	Athletic Bilbao	Cornellà de Llobregat
14:00 CET (UTC+1)	González de Zárate (yellow card) 46'; Fernández 62'	Report	Yeray (yellow card) 5'; Sancet 77'	Stadium: Stage Front Stadium; Attendance: 26,645; Referee: Guillermo Cuadra Fernández

23 February 2025 25	Athletic Bilbao	7–1	Valladolid	Bilbao
14:00 CET (UTC+1)	Jauregizar 10'; N. Williams 35', 66'; Sannadi 43'; Sancet 45+2'; Guruzeta 69'; Vivian (yellow card) 79'; Ruiz de Galarreta (yellow card) 84'; I. Williams 87'	Report	Martín (yellow card) 44'; Sylla 47'; Jurić (yellow card) 46' (yellow-red card) 56'	Stadium: San Mamés; Attendance: 47,715; Referee: César Soto Grado

1 March 2025 26	Atlético Madrid	1–0	Athletic Bilbao	Madrid
21:00 CET (UTC+1)	Sørloth (yellow card) 57'; Alvarez 66'; Barrios (yellow card) 68'	Report	Ruiz de Galarreta (yellow card) 32'; Gorosabel (yellow card) 62'; Yeray (yellow card) 87'	Stadium: Riyadh Air Metropolitano; Attendance: 63,810; Referee: Jesús Gil Manzano

9 March 2025 27	Athletic Bilbao	1–1	Mallorca	Bilbao
18:30 CET (UTC+1)	Gorosabel (yellow card) 16'; N. Williams 58'	Report	Raíllo 56', (yellow card) 90+6'; Copete (yellow card) 72'; Sánchez (yellow card) 86'	Stadium: San Mamés; Attendance: 48,203; Referee: Alejandro Hernández Hernández

16 March 2025 28	Sevilla	0–1	Athletic Bilbao	Seville
16:15 CET (UTC+1)	Nyland (yellow card) 10'; Sow (yellow card) 19'; Saúl (yellow card) 23'; Agoumé (yellow card) 84'	Report	Vesga (penalty missed) 45+3'; Berenguer (yellow card) 59'; Nuñez (yellow card) 65'; Yeray 84'	Stadium: Ramón Sánchez Pizjuán; Attendance: 37,016; Referee: Juan Luis Pulido Santana

30 March 2025 29	Athletic Bilbao	0–0	Osasuna	Bilbao
18:30 CEST (UTC+2)	Nuñez (yellow card) 38'	Report	Catena (yellow card) 45'	Stadium: San Mamés; Attendance: 49,671; Referee: Guillermo Cuadra Fernández

6 April 2025 30	Villarreal	0–0	Athletic Bilbao	Villarreal
21:00 CEST (UTC+2)	Gueye (red card) 83'	Report	Gorosabel (yellow card) 21'	Stadium: Estadio de la Cerámica; Attendance: 19,158; Referee: Mario Melero López

13 April 2025 31	Athletic Bilbao	3–1	Rayo Vallecano	Bilbao
21:00 CEST (UTC+2)	Djaló (yellow card) 12'; Vivian (yellow card) 36'; Sancet 58' (pen.), 90+4'; N. Williams 80'; Boiro (yellow card) 84'; I. Williams (yellow card) 87'	Report	Díaz (penalty missed) 37', (yellow card) 50'; Ciss 37'; Espino (yellow card) 57'; López (yellow card) 75'	Stadium: San Mamés; Attendance: 47,584; Referee: Adrián Cordero Vega

20 April 2025 32	Real Madrid	1–0	Athletic Bilbao	Madrid
21:00 CEST (UTC+2)	Asencio (yellow card) 75'; Valverde 90+3'	Report	Núñez (yellow card) 63'; Prados (yellow card) 86'	Stadium: Santiago Bernabéu; Attendance: 72,535; Referee: Juan Martínez Munuera

23 April 2025 33	Athletic Bilbao	1–0	Las Palmas	Bilbao
19:00 CEST (UTC+2)	I. Williams 5'; Berchiche (yellow card) 11'	Report	Bajcetic (yellow card) 27'; McBurnie (yellow card) 53'; Suárez (yellow card) 77'	Stadium: San Mamés; Attendance: 47,724; Referee: Isidro Díaz de Mera Escuderos

4 May 2025 34	Real Sociedad	0–0	Athletic Bilbao	San Sebastián
21:00 CEST (UTC+2)	Marín (yellow card) 58'	Report	Berenguer (yellow card) 44'; Gorosabel (yellow card) 78'	Stadium: Reale Arena; Attendance: 36,058; Referee: César Soto Grado

11 May 2025 35	Athletic Bilbao	1–0	Alavés	Bilbao
18:30 CEST (UTC+2)	Djaló (yellow card) 33'; Sánchez 71' (o.g.)	Report	Guevara (yellow card) 90+4'	Stadium: San Mamés; Attendance: 47,947; Referee: José Luis Munuera Montero

15 May 2025 36	Getafe	0–2	Athletic Bilbao	Getafe
21:30 CEST (UTC+2)	Milla (yellow card) 70'	Report	Guruzeta 76'; Vivian 89'	Stadium: Coliseum; Attendance: 11,564; Referee: Guillermo Cuadra Fernández

18 May 2025 37	Valencia	0–1	Athletic Bilbao	Valencia
19:00 CEST (UTC+2)	Gayà (yellow card) 42'; Rioja (yellow card) 66'; Mir (yellow card) 90+3'	Report	Boiro (yellow card) 15'; Berenguer 72'	Stadium: Mestalla; Attendance: 45,641; Referee: Alejandro Muñiz Ruiz

25 May 2025 38	Athletic Bilbao	0–3	Barcelona	Bilbao
21:00 CEST (UTC+2)	Berchiche (yellow card) 75'	Report	Lewandowski 14', 17'; Olmo 90+4' (pen.)	Stadium: San Mamés; Attendance: 50,231; Referee: Pablo González Fuertes

=== Copa del Rey ===
4 January 2025 Round of 32	UD Logroñés	0–0 (a.e.t.) (3–4 p)	Athletic Bilbao	Logroño
21:00 CET (UTC+1)	Bonilla (yellow card) 39'; Agüero (yellow card) 90'	Report	Nuñez (yellow card) 28'; Herrera (yellow card) 53'; Boiro (yellow card) 89'; I. Williams (yellow card) 90+5'; Jauregizar (yellow card) 102'	Stadium: Las Gaunas; Attendance: 15,577; Referee: Mario Melero López
	Penalties
	Monreal (penalty scored); Gualda (penalty missed); Sarriegi (penalty missed); Agüero (penalty scored); Moreno (penalty scored)		(penalty scored) Vivian; (penalty scored) Berchiche; (penalty missed) N. Williams; (penalty scored) Berenguer; (penalty scored) Gómez

16 January 2025 Round of 16	Athletic Bilbao	2–3	Osasuna	Bilbao
19:30 CET (UTC+1)	N. Williams 45+3'; De Marcos 55'; Jauregizar (yellow card) 84'	Report	Oroz 40'; Budimir 44' (pen.), 70'; Moncayola (yellow card) 45+3'; Catena (yellow card) 49'; Areso (yellow card) 90+4'	Stadium: San Mamés; Attendance: 48,230; Referee: Mateo Busquets Ferrer

=== Supercopa de España ===
8 January 2025 Semi-finals	Athletic Bilbao	0–2	Barcelona	Jeddah, Saudi Arabia
22:00 SAST (UTC+3)	Berenguer (yellow card) 50'; Gómez (yellow card) 76'	Report	Gavi 17'; Yamal 52'	Stadium: King Abdullah Sports City; Attendance: 42,000; Referee: Miguel Ángel Ortiz Arias

=== UEFA Europa League ===
==== League phase ====
The draw for the league phase was held on 30 August 2024.

Pos	Team	Pld	W	D	L	GF	GA	GD	Pts	Qualification
1	(Italian Football Federation) Lazio	8	6	1	1	17	5	+12	19	Advance to round of 16 (seeded)
2	(Royal Spanish Football Federation) Athletic Bilbao	8	6	1	1	15	7	+8	19	Advance to round of 16 (seeded)
3	(The Football Association) Manchester United	8	5	3	0	16	9	+7	18	Advance to round of 16 (seeded)
4	(The Football Association) Tottenham Hotspur	8	5	2	1	17	9	+8	17	Advance to round of 16 (seeded)
5	(German Football Association) Eintracht Frankfurt	8	5	1	2	14	10	+4	16	Advance to round of 16 (seeded)

Source: UEFA
Rules for classification: League phase tiebreakers

Round	1	2	3	4	5	6	7	8
Ground	A	H	H	A	H	A	A	H
Result	D	W	W	W	W	W	L	W
Position	16	11	8	6	2	2	3	2

Source: UEFA
A = Away; H = Home; W = Win; D = Draw; L = Loss

26 September 2024 1	Roma (Italy)	1–1	(Spain) Athletic Bilbao	Rome, Italy
21:00 CEST (UTC+2)	Dovbyk 32'; Koné (yellow card) 44'; Baldanzi (yellow card) 63'	Report	Gorosabel (yellow card) 44'; Berchiche (yellow card) 56'; De Marcos (yellow card) 83'; Paredes 85'; N. Williams (yellow card) 90+5'	Stadium: Stadio Olimpico; Attendance: 63,072; Referee: Georgi Kabakov (Bulgaria)

3 October 2024 2	Athletic Bilbao (Spain)	2–0	(Netherlands) AZ	Bilbao, Spain
21:00 CEST (UTC+2)	I. Williams 72'; Ruiz de Galarreta (yellow card) 82'; Sancet 85'	Report	Maikuma (yellow card) 42'; Van Bommel (yellow card) 78'	Stadium: San Mamés; Attendance: 40,328; Referee: Balázs Berke (Hungary)

24 October 2024 3	Athletic Bilbao (Spain)	1–0	(Czech Republic) Slavia Prague	Bilbao, Spain
21:00 CEST (UTC+2)	N. Williams 33'; Vivian (yellow card) 44'; De Marcos (yellow card) 79'	Report	Zafeiris (yellow card) 68'; Bořil (yellow card) 81'	Stadium: San Mamés; Attendance: 47,776; Referee: Morten Krogh (Denmark)

7 November 2024 4	Ludogorets Razgrad (Bulgaria)	1–2	(Spain) Athletic Bilbao	Razgrad, Bulgaria
19:45 EET (UTC+2)	Erick Marcus 20'; Rick (yellow card) 30'; Rusev (yellow card) 77'; Rwan (yellow card) 90+4'	Report	Berchiche (yellow card) 23'; Vivian (yellow card) 48'; Vesga (yellow card) 72'; I. Williams 73'; Serrano 74', (yellow card) 90+4'	Stadium: Huvepharma Arena; Attendance: 9,725; Referee: Anastasios Papapetrou (Greece)

28 November 2024 5	Athletic Bilbao (Spain)	3–0	(Sweden) IF Elfsborg	Bilbao, Spain
18:45 CET (UTC+1)	Boiro 6'; I. Williams (yellow card) 22'; Prados 24'; Guruzeta 54'	Report	Buhari (yellow card) 30'	Stadium: San Mamés; Attendance: 46,325; Referee: Giorgi Kruashvili (Georgia)

11 December 2024 6	Fenerbahçe (Turkey)	0–2	(Spain) Athletic Bilbao	Istanbul, Turkey
18:30 TRT (UTC+3)	Müldür (yellow card) 57' (yellow-red card) 69'; Amrabat (yellow card) 90+1'	Report	I. Williams 5', 45'; Yeray (yellow card) 7'; Gómez (yellow card) 80'; Sancet (yellow card) 90+1'	Stadium: Şükrü Saracoğlu Stadium; Attendance: 35,263; Referee: Irfan Peljto (Bosnia and Herzegovina)

22 January 2025 7	Beşiktaş (Turkey)	4–1	(Spain) Athletic Bilbao	Istanbul, Turkey
18:30 TRT (UTC+3)	Rashica 7', 60', (yellow card) 67'; Immobile (yellow card) 37'; Masuaku (yellow card) 45+1'; Silva 77'; João Mário 90+2' (pen.)	Report	Gómez 45'	Stadium: Beşiktaş Stadium; Attendance: 35,980; Referee: Julian Weinberger (Austria)

30 January 2025 8	Athletic Bilbao (Spain)	3–1	(Czech Republic) Viktoria Plzeň	Bilbao, Spain
21:00 CET (UTC+1)	N. Williams 25'; Berenguer (yellow card) 31'; Yeray 64'; Djaló (yellow card) 84'; Martón 90+5'	Report	Adu (yellow card) 21'; Dweh (yellow card) 63'; Havel 71'; Vašulín (red card) 87'	Stadium: San Mamés; Attendance: 45,471; Referee: Matej Jug (Slovenia)

==== Knockout phase ====
===== Round of 16 =====
The draw for the round of 16 was held on 21 February 2025.

6 March 2025 First leg	Roma (Italy)	2–1	(Spain) Athletic Bilbao	Rome, Italy
21:00 CET (UTC+1)	Angeliño 56'; Shomurodov (yellow card) 72', (goal) 90+3'	Report	Yeray (yellow card) 19' (yellow-red card) 85'; Jauregizar (yellow card) 34'; Sannadi (yellow card) 39'; I. Williams 50'	Stadium: Stadio Olimpico; Attendance: 62,540; Referee: Sandro Schärer (Switzerland)

13 March 2025 Second leg	Athletic Bilbao (Spain)	3–1 (4–3 agg.)	(Italy) Roma	Bilbao, Spain
18:45 CET (UTC+1)	N. Williams 45+3', 82'; Berchiche 68'; I. Williams (yellow card) 71'; Gorosabel (yellow card) 90+1'	Report	Hummels (red card) 11'; Svilar (yellow card) 12'; Rensch (yellow card) 60'; Paredes (yellow card) 71', (goal) 90+3' (pen.); Soulé (yellow card) 90+3'	Stadium: San Mamés; Attendance: 50,666; Referee: Clément Turpin (France)

===== Quarter-finals =====
The draw for the order of the quarter-final legs was held on 21 February 2025, after the draw for the round of 16.

10 April 2025 First leg	Rangers (Scotland)	0–0	(Spain) Athletic Bilbao	Glasgow, Scotland
20:00 BST (UTC+1)	Pröpper (red card) 13'	Report	Ruiz de Galarreta (yellow card) 29'; Sannadi (yellow card) 54'; Berenguer (penalty missed) 82'; Prados (yellow card) 90+12'	Stadium: Ibrox Stadium; Attendance: 49,922; Referee: István Kovács (Romania)

17 April 2025 Second leg	Athletic Bilbao (Spain)	2–0 (2–0 agg.)	(Scotland) Rangers	Bilbao, Spain
21:00 CEST (UTC+2)	Sancet 45+4' (pen.), (yellow card) 51'; N. Williams 80'	Report	Dessers (yellow card) 19'; Balogun (yellow card) 32'; Tavernier (yellow card) 77'	Stadium: San Mamés; Attendance: 52,114; Referee: Irfan Peljto (Bosnia and Herzegovina)

===== Semi-finals =====
The draw for the order of the semi-final legs was held on 21 February 2025, after the draw for the round of 16 and quarter-finals.

1 May 2025 First leg	Athletic Bilbao (Spain)	0–3	(England) Manchester United	Bilbao, Spain
21:00 CEST (UTC+2)	Vivian (red card) 35'; Berchiche (yellow card) 36'; Simón (yellow card) 58'; Yeray (yellow card) 61'	Report	Casemiro 30'; Fernandes 37' (pen.), 45'; Mount (yellow card) 77'; Garnacho (yellow card) 84'; Yoro (yellow card) 90+3'	Stadium: San Mamés; Attendance: 51,980; Referee: Espen Eskås (Norway)

8 May 2025 Second leg	Manchester United (England)	4–1 (7–1 agg.)	(Spain) Athletic Bilbao	Manchester, England
20:00 BST (UTC+1)	Mazraoui (yellow card) 25'; Casemiro (yellow card) 59', (goal) 80'; Mount 72', 90+1'; Højlund 85'; Dorgu (yellow card) 90+1'	Report	Jauregizar 31', (yellow card) 39'; Núñez (yellow card) 78'; Berenguer (yellow card) 78'; Sannadi (yellow card) 89'	Stadium: Old Trafford; Attendance: 73,298; Referee: Daniel Siebert (Germany)

== Statistics ==
=== Appearances and goals ===
No.	Pos	Nat	Player	Total		La Liga		Copa del Rey		Supercopa de España		Europa League	
No.	Pos	Nat	Player	Apps	Goals	Apps	Goals	Apps	Goals	Apps	Goals	Apps	Goals
Goalkeepers
1	GK	(Spain) ESP	Unai Simón	23	0	21	0	0	0	1	0	1	0
13	GK	(Spain) ESP	Julen Agirrezabala	29	0	14	0	2	0	0	0	13	0
Defenders
2	DF	(Spain) ESP	Andoni Gorosabel	30	0	17+3	0	0+1	0	0	0	6+3	0
3	DF	(Spain) ESP	Daniel Vivian	46	4	28+4	4	1+1	0	1	0	10+1	0
4	DF	(Spain) ESP	Aitor Paredes	36	4	21+2	3	2	0	1	0	8+2	1
5	DF	(Spain) ESP	Yeray Álvarez	29	2	20+1	1	0+1	0	0	0	7	1
14	DF	(Spain) ESP	Unai Nuñez	15	0	7+3	0	1	0	0	0	3+1	0
15	DF	(Spain) ESP	Iñigo Lekue	21	0	8+8	0	0	0	1	0	2+2	0
17	DF	(Spain) ESP	Yuri Berchiche	44	1	22+8	0	1+1	0	1	0	11	1
18	DF	(Spain) ESP	Óscar de Marcos	41	1	17+9	0	2	1	0+1	0	8+4	0
32	DF	(Spain) ESP	Adama Boiro	20	1	13+5	0	1	0	0	0	1	1
Midfielders
6	MF	(Spain) ESP	Mikel Vesga	34	0	10+15	0	1	0	0+1	0	0+7	0
8	MF	(Spain) ESP	Oihan Sancet	36	17	19+10	15	0	0	0	0	5+2	2
16	MF	(Spain) ESP	Iñigo Ruiz de Galarreta	40	0	18+8	0	1	0	0	0	12+1	0
20	MF	(Spain) ESP	Unai Gómez	47	2	14+18	1	0+1	0	1	0	5+8	1
23	MF	(Spain) ESP	Mikel Jauregizar	48	3	25+9	2	1+1	0	1	0	10+1	1
24	MF	(Spain) ESP	Beñat Prados	45	2	21+9	1	0+1	0	1	0	6+7	1
28	MF	(Spain) ESP	Peio Canales	8	0	2+6	0	0	0	0	0	0	0
Forwards
7	FW	(Spain) ESP	Álex Berenguer	53	6	28+8	6	2	0	1	0	7+7	0
9	FW	(Ghana) GHA	Iñaki Williams	50	11	29+6	6	1+1	0	1	0	11+1	5
10	FW	(Spain) ESP	Nico Williams	45	11	22+7	5	1+1	1	0+1	0	12+1	5
11	FW	(Guinea-Bissau) GBS	Álvaro Djaló	28	1	7+10	1	1+1	0	0+1	0	3+5	0
12	FW	(Spain) ESP	Gorka Guruzeta	51	8	21+15	7	2	0	1	0	7+5	1
21	FW	(Morocco) MAR	Maroan Sannadi	22	1	7+9	1	0	0	0	0	6	0
33	FW	(Spain) ESP	Aingeru Olabarrieta	2	0	1	0	0	0	0	0	0+1	0
33	FW	(Spain) ESP	Endika Buján	1	0	0+1	0	0	0	0	0	0	0
Players who have made an appearance this season but have left the club
19	FW	(Spain) ESP	Javier Martón	4	1	0+3	0	0	0	0	0	0+1	1
21	MF	(Spain) ESP	Ander Herrera	14	0	2+6	0	1	0	0	0	0+5	0
22	FW	(Spain) ESP	Nico Serrano	10	1	1+3	0	1+1	0	0+1	0	0+3	1
23	FW	(Spain) ESP	Malcom Adu Ares	1	0	0+1	0	0	0	0	0	0	0
26	GK	(Mexico) MEX	Álex Padilla	5	0	3+2	0	0	0	0	0	0	0
