= Sophie Istillart =

French footballer (born 1996)

Personal information
- Date of birth: 23 April 1996 (age 30)
- Place of birth: Bayonne, France
- Height: 1.67 m (5 ft 6 in)
- Position: Midfielder

Youth career
- 2008–2011: Les Eglantins D'Hendaye
- 2011–2012: Mariño

Senior career*
Years	Team	Apps	(Gls)
2012–2015	Blanquefortaise		
2015–2020	Bordeaux	72+	(2+)
2020–2022	Athletic Club	33	(0)
- * Club domestic league appearances and goals as of 19:59, 25 September 2021 (UTC)

Sophie Istillart (born 23 April 1996) is a French retired professional footballer who played as a midfielder.

== Club career ==
Istillart started her career in Les Eglantins D'Hendaye's academy. She joined Bordeaux when the club was formed in 2015, and was the team captain in Division 1 Féminine. In August 2020, she signed for Athletic Club and, in doing so, became the first female footballer from the French Basque Country to do so under their selective signing policy. She made her debut for the club against Logroño in the Copa de la Reina on 7 October 2020.

Istillart sustained a serious injury to her right knee in January 2022, and announced her retirement from playing three months later, at the age of 26.

== International career ==
Istillart has been called up to represent the Basque Country national team.

== Personal life ==
Istillart comes from a family of sportspeople. Her twin sister Carole played for the women's rugby union team of Stade Bordelais. Her aunt, Danièle, and sister, Isabelle, have also played rugby.
