= Alex Padilla (footballer) =

Mexican footballer (born 2003)

Personal information
- Full name: Alejandro Padilla Pérez
- Date of birth: 1 September 2003 (age 23)
- Place of birth: Zarautz, Spain
- Height: 1.90 m (6 ft 3 in)
- Position: Goalkeeper

Team information
- Current team: Athletic Bilbao
- Number: 13

Youth career
- Zarautz
- 2019–2021: Athletic Bilbao

Senior career*
Years	Team	Apps	(Gls)
2021–2022	Basconia	24	(0)
2022–2024	Bilbao Athletic	51	(0)
2024–	Athletic Bilbao	6	(0)
2025	→ UNAM (loan)	12	(0)

International career^{‡}
2021–2022	Spain U19	6	(0)
2024–	Mexico U23	2	(0)
2026–	Mexico	1	(0)
- * Club domestic league appearances and goals as of 23 May 2026 ‡ National team caps and goals as of 6 October 2026

Alejandro "Álex" Padilla Pérez (born 1 September 2003) is a professional footballer who plays as a goalkeeper for La Liga club Athletic Bilbao. Born in Spain, he represents the Mexico national team.

== Early life ==
Padilla was born in Zarautz, Gipuzkoa, Basque Country to a Spanish father (from Bergara) and a Mexican mother. At three months old, he moved with his parents to his mother's hometown of Camargo, Chihuahua and lived there until age fourteen.

== Club career ==
Padilla joined Athletic Bilbao's youth academy at Lezama in 2019, from hometown side Zarautz. He made his senior debut with the farm team Basconia on 15 September 2021, starting in a 2–2 Tercera División RFEF away draw against Anaitasuna.

Promoted to the reserves in Primera Federación ahead of the 2022–23 season, Padilla first appeared with the side on 28 August 2022, starting in a 2–1 home loss to La Nucía. In 2023, he was called up to the pre-season with the main squad.

Due to injuries to Unai Simón and Julen Agirrezabala in the summer of 2024, Padilla was the candidate to step into the first team for the beginning of the 2024–25 season. He appeared in several pre-season matches, including the second half of a 3–2 loss against Aston Villa, and made his La Liga debut as a starter against Getafe at the San Mamés on 15 August 2024; he made several saves, including from Carles Aleñá in a one-on-one situation, and was not at fault for the goal his side conceded in a 1–1 draw.

On 9 January 2025, Padilla joined Mexican club UNAM on a six-month loan.

== International career ==
=== Youth ===
On 2 September 2021, Padilla made his debut for the Spain U19's, coming on as a half-time substitute for Alejandro Iturbe in a 5–1 win against Mexico.

In November 2021, Padilla was included for Spain's squad for the qualifying matches of the 2022 UEFA European Under-19 Championship. He started and played the full 90 minutes against Azerbaijan, as his side cruised to a 6–0 win, qualifying for the elite round. In the elite round, Padilla had played the full matches over Austria and Poland, suffering a 2–2 and 3–3 draw and finishing second behind Austria, thus failing to qualify for the final tournament.

In March 2024, Padilla was called up by the Mexico national under-23 team. On 22 March, he made his debut in a 4–2 defeat against Argentina.

In June 2024, he took part in the Maurice Revello Tournament in France with Mexico.

=== Senior ===
On 29 August 2024, Padilla received his first call-up to the Mexico national team.

Padilla made his full senior debut for the Mexico national team on 6 October 2026 in a friendly match against Chile.

== Career statistics ==
=== Club ===
As of match played 23 May 2026

Appearances and goals by club, season and competition
Club	Season	League			National cup (Note: Includes Copa del Rey)		Continental		Other		Total	
Club	Season	Division	Apps	Goals	Apps	Goals	Apps	Goals	Apps	Goals	Apps	Goals
Basconia	2021–22	Tercera Federación	24	0	—		—		—		24	0
Bilbao Athletic	2022–23	Primera Federación	25	0	—		—		—		25	0
Bilbao Athletic	2023–24	Segunda Federación	26	0	—		—		—		26	0
Bilbao Athletic	Total		51	0	—		—		—		51	0
Athletic Bilbao	2023–24	La Liga	0	0	0	0	—		—		0	0
Athletic Bilbao	2024–25	La Liga	5	0	0	0	0	0	0	0	5	0
Athletic Bilbao	2025–26	La Liga	1	0	5	0	0	0	0	0	6	0
Athletic Bilbao	Total		6	0	5	0	0	0	0	0	11	0
UNAM (loan)	2024–25	Liga MX	12	0	—		6 (Note: Appearances in CONCACAF Champions Cup)	0	—		18	0
Career total			93	0	5	0	6	0	0	0	104	0

=== International ===
As of match played on 6 October 2026

Appearances and goals by national team and year
National team	Year	Apps	Goals
Mexico	2026	1	0
Total		1	0

== Honours ==
Bilbao Athletic

- Segunda Federación: 2023–24 (Group 2)

Athletic Bilbao

- Copa del Rey: 2023–24
