= List of football clubs with home-grown players policy =

Several football club (association football) prefer to utilise players who are born in or descended from a specific ethnic background.

== Europe ==
=== Spain ===
- Athletic Bilbao - The club will only field Basque players but will and have employed non-Basque coaching staff. The club's cantera approach has produced players such as Julen Guerrero, Fernando Llorente and Nico Williams. They have never been relegated from the top division.
- UE Olot - The club will only field players from the Catalan Countries.

=== Turkey ===
- Altınordu F.K. - The club has never signed any non-Turkish players in order promote their youth talent from their own academy. Some of the players that came from this club were currently played in the top Europe league such as Çağlar Söyüncü and Cengiz Ünder of Fenerbahçe, and also Burak İnce of Śląsk Wrocław.

=== Hungary ===
- Paksi FC - The club use only Hungarian players.

=== Germany ===
- TuS Haltern - At the German amateur club TuS Haltern, a certain part of the squad must have been born or trained in the Westphalia region. Since the 2021/22 season, 75% of the squad must consist of "local players".

=== Estonia ===
- Flora have a policy of only signing Native Estonians or players with Estonian citizenship.

== North America ==
=== Canada ===
- FC Supra du Québec - The club intends to only field Québécois players, that is, players born and/or raised in Quebec or of French Canadian descent.

=== Mexico ===
- C.D. Guadalajara - The club will only field Mexican players. The club's academy has produced players such as Mexican internationals Carlos Vela and Javier Hernández.

== South America ==
=== Ecuador ===
- C.D. El Nacional - The club has maintained a tradition of only playing Ecuadorian footballers, which has given them the nickname of Puros Criollos ("Pure Natives"). They are administered by the Military of Ecuador.

== Asia ==
=== Hong Kong ===
- HK U23 Football Team - Under the direct control of the Hong Kong Football Association, most of the players are part of the Hong Kong national under-23 football team. The club existed from 2021 to 2024.

=== Malaysia ===
- Petaling Jaya City - Founded in 2004 as Malaysian Indian Football Association. In 2021, the club only fielded Malaysian players. From 2019 to 2022, they played in the Malaysia Super League.
- Harimau Muda - Known as the Malaysia National Elite Football Project, it was founded in 2007. It was the former name of the current Malaysia national under-22 football team. The team was then split into two teams, Harimau Muda A & Harimau Muda B in 2009. The team previously competed in the Malaysia Premier League. Harimau Muda was disbanded in 2015.

=== Philippines ===
- Azkals Development Team - Under the direct control of the Philippine Football Federation, most of the players are part of the Philippines national under-23 football team. The club existed from 2020 to 2023. They returned in 2026 as Azkals Development Club.
- Philippine Air Force - Under the direct control of the Armed Forces of the Philippines, most of the players are selected for the Philippines men's national football team.
- Philippine Army - Under the direct control of the Armed Forces of the Philippines, most of the players are selected for the Philippines men's national football team.
- Philippine Navy - Under the direct control of the Armed Forces of the Philippines, most of the players are selected for the Philippines men's national football team.

=== Singapore ===
- Young Lions - Under the direct control of Football Association of Singapore, most of the players are part of the Singapore national under-23 football team.

=== South Korea ===
- Gimcheon Sangmu FC, a South Korean military club only fielding players from that nation.

=== Thailand ===
- Army United F.C. - Formed in 1916 as Royal Thai Army Football Club, it was played with an all-homegrown squad until 2011, when they first signed-in foreign players. The club disbanded in 2019.
- Air Force United F.C. - Formed in 1937 as Royal Thai Air Force Football Club, it consists of players from Royal Thai Air Force. The club relocated to Uthai Thani to become Uthai Thani F.C. in 2019.
- Royal Thai Army F.C. - Under the supervision of the Royal Thai Army, it was formed in 2011 as Army Welfare Department FC, it was renamed Royal Thai Army FC in 2015. It consists of enlisted members of the Royal Thai Army. They currently plays in Thai League 3.
- Royal Thai Air Force F.C. - Under the supervision of the Royal Thai Air Force, it consists of enlisted members of the Royal Thai Air Force. They currently plays in Thai League 3.
- Royal Thai Navy F.C. - Under the supervision of the Royal Thai Navy, it consists of enlisted members of the Royal Thai Navy. They currently plays in Thai League 3.
- Police United F.C. - Under the supervision of the Royal Thai Police, it was merged with BEC Tero Sasana to become Police Tero F.C. in 2018.

== See also ==
- Athletic Bilbao signing policy
