= Unai Buján =

Spanish footballer (born 2001)

Personal information
- Full name: Unai Buján Díez
- Date of birth: 8 February 2001 (age 25)
- Place of birth: Barakaldo, Spain
- Height: 1.74 m (5 ft 9 in)
- Position: Winger

Team information
- Current team: Arenas
- Number: 17

Youth career
- Barakaldo
- 2011–2012: Athletic Bilbao
- 2012–2016: Barakaldo
- 2016–2020: Danok Bat

Senior career*
Years	Team	Apps	(Gls)
2020–2022	Sestao River	57	(5)
2022–2023	Amorebieta	36	(4)
2023–2024	Osasuna B	33	(3)
2024–2025	Barakaldo	27	(1)
2025–2026	Podbeskidzie	8	(0)
2026	Marbella	5	(0)
2026–	Arenas	5	(0)
- * Club domestic league appearances and goals as of 26 September 2026

Unai Buján Díez (born 8 February 2001) is a Spanish professional footballer who plays as a left winger for Primera Federación club Arenas.

== Club career ==
Born in Barakaldo, Biscay, Basque Country, Buján represented Barakaldo CF, Athletic Bilbao and Danok Bat CF as a youth. On 27 August 2020, after finishing his formation, he signed for Tercera División side Sestao River Club.

Buján made his senior debut on 18 October 2020, starting in a 0–0 home draw against Tolosa CF. He scored his first goal on 15 May of the following year, netting his team's second in a 3–0 away win over Urduliz FT, and contributed with 25 appearances overall as his club achieved promotion to Segunda División RFEF.

On 18 July 2022, Buján joined Primera Federación side SD Amorebieta. He scored four times in 36 league matches during his first year, as the club achieved promotion to Segunda División.

In July 2023, however, Buján agreed to a one-year contract with CA Osasuna and was assigned to the reserves in the third division. On 11 July of the following year, he returned to his first club Barakaldo on a one-year deal.

After being mainly a backup option, Buján left Baraka on 26 June 2025, and moved abroad for the first time in his career roughly one month later, signing for Polish II liga side Podbeskidzie Bielsko-Biała. He made his professional debut on 1 August, coming on as a second-half substitute for Maksymilian Sitek in a 5–2 away loss to Stal Stalowa Wola.

After featuring rarely, Buján and Podbeskidzie agreed to part ways on 15 January 2026. The following day, he returned to Spain and joined third-tier side Marbella FC on a deal until the end of the season.

== Personal life ==
Buján's younger cousin Endika is also a footballer and a winger. He too played for Barakaldo.

== Honours ==
Amorebieta

- Primera Federación: 2022–23
