= Javier Martón =

Spanish footballer (born 1999)

Personal information
- Full name: Javier Martón Ansó
- Date of birth: 6 May 1999 (age 27)
- Place of birth: Tudela, Spain
- Height: 1.83 m (6 ft 0 in)
- Position: Forward

Team information
- Current team: Eibar
- Number: 20

Youth career
- Alesves
- Falcesino
- Osasuna
- Peña Sport
- 2017–2018: Real Sociedad

Senior career*
Years	Team	Apps	(Gls)
2016–2017	Peña Sport	1	(0)
2018–2020	Real Sociedad C	18	(7)
2018–2019	→ Peña Sport (loan)	26	(16)
2020–2023	Real Sociedad B	50	(12)
2020–2021	→ Covadonga (loan)	24	(9)
2023–2025	Athletic Bilbao	3	(0)
2023–2024	→ Mirandés (loan)	20	(4)
2025	→ Albacete (loan)	13	(3)
2025–	Eibar	39	(14)
- * Club domestic league appearances and goals as of 6 June 2026

Javier Martón Ansó (born 6 May 1999) is a Spanish professional footballer who plays as a forward for SD Eibar.

== Career ==
Born in Tudela, Navarre, Martón was a Peña Sport FC youth graduate, and made his first team debut on 10 December 2016 by playing the last 18 minutes of a 1–1 Tercera División away draw against CD Valle de Egüés. In the 2017 summer, he moved to Real Sociedad and returned to the youth setup.

Martón returned to Peña Sport for the 2018–19 season, after agreeing to a loan deal. Upon returning to the Txuri-urdin, he played for the C-team before moving to Segunda División B side CD Covadonga on 9 September 2020, also in a temporary deal.

Martón scored nine times for the Asturians, but was unable to avoid relegation. He returned to Real Sociedad on 2 June 2021, and was assigned to the reserves in Segunda División; he renewed his contract until 2023 on 6 August.

Martón made his professional debut on 14 August 2021, coming on as a second-half substitute for goalscorer Jon Karrikaburu in a 1–0 home win over CD Leganés. He started to feature regularly for the B's during the 2022–23 season, scoring 12 goals in Primera Federación.

On 5 July 2023, free agent Martón signed a three-year contract with Athletic Bilbao. On 31 August, however, he was sent on loan to CD Mirandés in the second division for the 2023–24 season.

Upon his return from the loan, Martón made his La Liga debut for Athletic on 28 August 2024, in a 1–0 victory over Valencia CF. On 3 February 2025, after being rarely used, he returned to the second tier on a new loan to Albacete Balompié.

On 16 July 2025, Martón joined SD Eibar on a three-year deal; Athletic also retained a percentage of a future sale and a buy-back clause.

== Career statistics ==
As of match played 30 January 2025

Appearances and goals by club, season and competition
Club	Season	League			Cup		Continental		Other		Total	
Club	Season	Division	Apps	Goals	Apps	Goals	Apps	Goals	Apps	Goals	Apps	Goals
Peña Sport	2016–17	Tercera División	1	0	—		—		—		1	0
Peña Sport (loan)	2018–19	Tercera División	26	16	—		—		—		26	16
Real Sociedad C	2019–20	Tercera División	18	7	—		—		—		18	7
Real Sociedad B	2020–21	Segunda División B	0	0	—		—		—		0	0
Real Sociedad B	2021–22	Segunda División	15	0	—		—		—		15	0
Real Sociedad B	2022–23	Primera Federación	35	12	—		—		—		35	12
Real Sociedad B	Total		50	12	—		—		—		50	12
Covadonga (loan)	2020–21	Segunda División B	24	9	—		—		—		24	9
Athletic Bilbao	2023–24	La Liga	0	0	0	0	—		—		0	0
Athletic Bilbao	2024–25	La Liga	3	0	0	0	1 (Note: Appearances in UEFA Europa League)	1	0	0	4	1
Athletic Bilbao	Total		3	0	0	0	1	1	0	0	4	1
Mirandés (loan)	2023–24	Segunda División	20	4	1	0	—		—		21	4
Career total			142	48	1	0	1	1	0	0	144	49
