= List of Athletic Bilbao managers =

Athletic Bilbao is a professional association football club based in Bilbao, Spain, which plays in La Liga. This chronological list comprises all those who have held the position of manager of the first team of Athletic Bilbao from 1910, when the first professional manager was appointed, to the present day. Each manager's entry includes his dates of tenure, honours won and significant achievements while under his care.

== List of managers ==
Updated until the end of the 2023-24 season.

Current coach.

Coach	C	Stage(s)	Statistics					
Coach	C	Stage(s)	Pld	W	D	L	%	Titles
Mr. Shepherd	(England)	1910–1911						1 Copa del Rey
Billy Barnes	(England)	1914–1916, 1920–1921	38	27	5	6	0,71	3 Copa del Rey
Jack Burton	(England)	1921–1922	4	1	1	2	0,25	-
Juan Arzuaga	(Spain)	1921–1922	4	3	0	1	0,75	-
Frederick Pentland	(England)	1922–1925, 1929–1933	178	128	21	29	0,72	2 La Liga; 5 Copa del Rey
Ralph Kirby	(England)	1925–1926	14	11	1	2	0,78	-
Máximo Royo	(Spain)	1925–1926, 1928–1929	32	16	6	10	0,5	-
Lippo Hertzka	(Hungary)	1926–1928	35	21	6	8	0,6	-
Patricio Caicedo	(Spain)	1933–1935	68	40	8	20	0,59	1 La Liga
José María Olabarria	(Spain)	1935	3	1	1	1	0,33	1 La Liga
William Garbutt	(England)	1935–1936	23	14	2	7	0,61	1 La Liga
Perico Birichinaga	(Spain)	1939	10	7	1	2	0,7	-
Roberto Etxebarria	(Spain)	1939–1940	34	20	6	8	0,59	-
Juan Urquizu	(Spain)	1940–1947	241	126	39	76	0,52	1 La Liga; 3 Copa del Rey
Henry John Bagge	(England)	1947–1949	57	29	6	22	0,51	-
José Iraragorri	(Spain)	1949–1952	103	54	17	32	0,52	1 Copa del Rey; 1 Copa Eva Duarte
Antonio Barrios	(Spain)	1952–1954, 1964–1965	120	55	24	41	0,46	-
Ferdinand Daučík	(Czechoslovakia)	1954–1957	118	67	26	25	0,56	1 La Liga; 2 Copa del Rey
Baltasar Albéniz	(Spain)	1957–1958	37	20	4	13	0,54	1 Copa del Rey
Martim Francisco	(Brazil)	1958–1960	87	47	8	32	0,54	-
Juan Antonio Ipiña	(Spain)	1960–1962	58	24	12	22	0,41	-
Ángel Zubieta	(Spain)	1962–1963	35	13	8	14	0,37	-
Juan Otxoantezana	(Spain)	1963–1964	32	12	6	14	0,37	-
Piru Gaínza	(Spain)	1965–1968	130	57	30	43	0,44	-
Rafael Iriondo	(Spain)	1968–1969, 1974–1976	113	46	32	32	0,40	1 Copa del Rey
Ronnie Allen	(England)	1969–1971	88	40	21	27	0,45	-
Salvador Artigas	(Spain)	1971–1972	32	18	3	11	0,56	-
Milorad Pavic	(Socialist Federal Republic of Yugoslavia)	1972–1974	83	36	18	29	0,43	1 Copa del Rey
Koldo Aguirre	(Spain)	1976–1979	137	58	35	44	0,42	-
Helmut Senekowitsch	(Austria)	1979–1980	49	25	6	18	0,51	-
Iñaki Sáez	(Spain)	1980–1981, 1986, 1991–1992	107	47	23	37	0,44	-
Javier Clemente	(Spain)	1981–1986, 1990–1991, 2005–2006	289	141	68	80	0,48	2 La Liga; 1 Copa del Rey; 1 Supercopa de España
José Ángel Iribar	(Spain)	1986–1987	54	20	13	21	0,37	-
Howard Kendall	(England)	1987–1989	102	44	29	29	0,43	-
Txetxu Rojo	(Spain)	1989–1990, 2000–2001	70	20	23	27	0,28	-
Jesús Aranguren	(Spain)	1992	16	6	2	8	0,37	-
Jupp Heynckes	(Germany)	1992–1994, 2001–2003	168	70	42	56	0,41	-
Javier Irureta	(Spain)	1994–1995	35	13	9	13	0,37	-
José María Amorrortu	(Spain)	1995, 1996	24	10	7	7	0,41	-
Dragoslav Stepanovic	(Federal Republic of Yugoslavia)	1995–1996	37	12	11	14	0,41	-
Luis Fernández	(France)	1996–2000	184	72	62	50	0,39	-
Ernesto Valverde	(Spain)	2003–2005, 2013–2017, 2022–current	397	185	90	122	0,47	1 Copa del Rey; 1 Supercopa de España
José Luis Mendilibar	(Spain)	2005	13	3	3	7	0,23	-
Félix Sarriugarte	(Spain)	2006	14	1	6	7	0,07	-
Mané	(Spain)	2006–2007	26	9	5	12	0,34	-
Joaquín Caparrós	(Spain)	2007–2011	187	70	44	73	0,37	-
Marcelo Bielsa	(Argentina)	2011–2013	113	43	31	39	0,38	-
José Ángel Ziganda	(Spain)	2017–2018	56	17	18	21	0,30	-
Eduardo Berizzo	(Argentina)	2018	15	2	8	5	0,13	-
Gaizka Garitano	(Spain)	2018–2020	89	37	23	29	0,41	-
Marcelino García Toral	(Spain)	2021–2022	75	28	26	21	0,37	1 Supercopa de España

== Trophies ==
No.	Name	LL	CdR	SdE/CED	Total
1.	(England) Fred Pentland	2	5	—	7
2.	(Spain) Juan Urquizu	1	3	—	4
2.	(Spain) Javier Clemente	2	1	1	4
4.	(England) Billy Barnes	—	3	—	3
4.	(Czechoslovakia) Ferdinand Daučík	1	2	—	3
6.	(Spain) Ernesto Valverde	—	1	1	2
6.	(Spain) José Iraragorri	—	1	1	2
7.	(Spain) Patricio Caicedo	1	—	—	1
7.	(Spain) José María Olabarría	1	—	—	1
7.	(England) William Garbutt	1	—	—	1
7.	(Spain) Baltasar Albéniz	—	1	—	1
7.	(Spain) Rafael Iriondo	—	1	—	1
7.	(Socialist Federal Republic of Yugoslavia) Milorad Pavić	—	1	—	1
7.	(Spain) Marcelino	—	—	1	1
