= Unai Gómez =

Spanish footballer (born 2003)

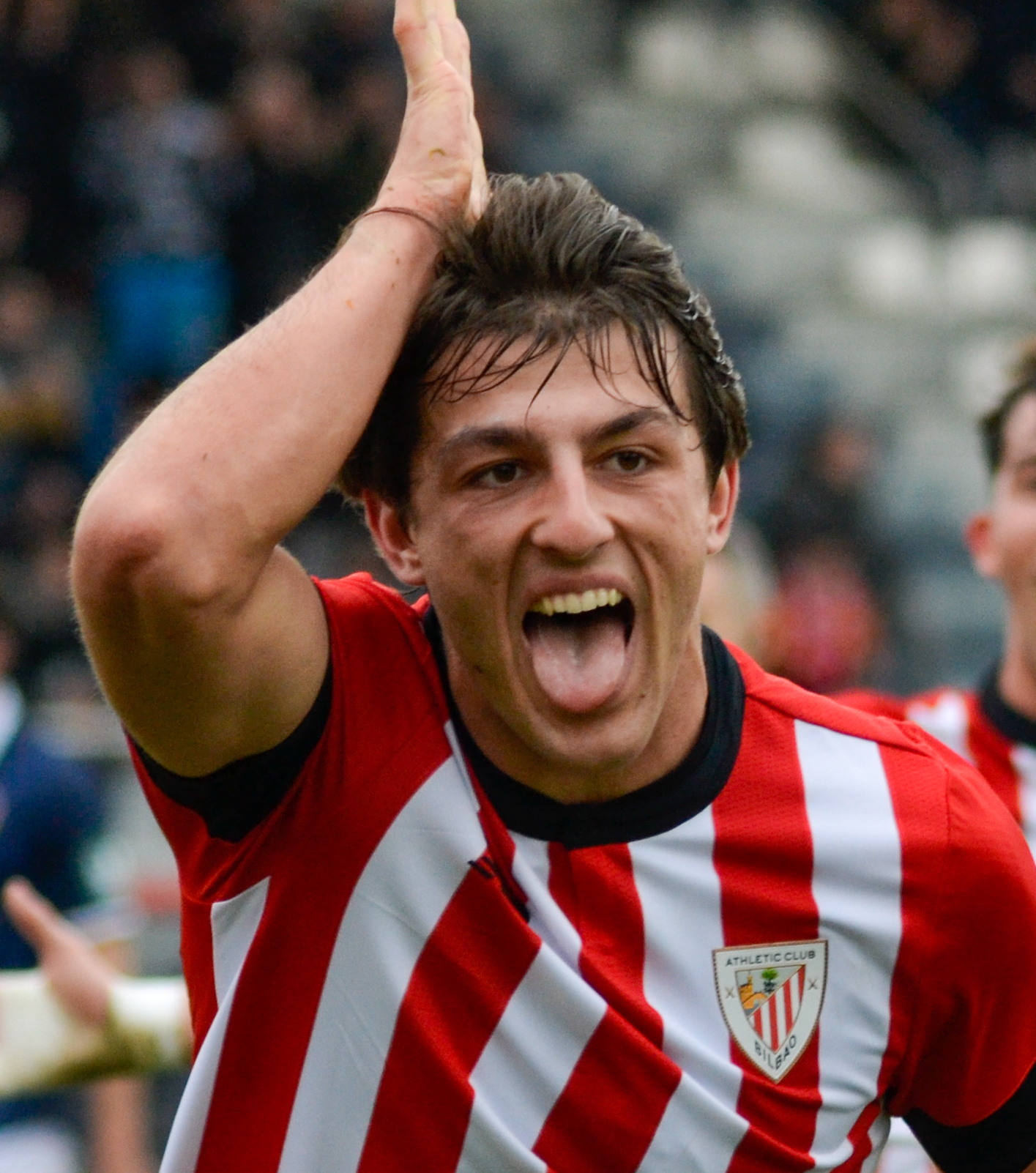
- Gómez in 2023

Personal information
- Full name: Unai Gómez Etxebarria
- Date of birth: 25 May 2003 (age 23)
- Place of birth: Bermeo, Spain
- Height: 1.83 m (6 ft 0 in)
- Position: Attacking midfielder

Team information
- Current team: Udinese

Youth career
- 2013–2014: Bermeo
- 2014–2016: Athletic Bilbao
- 2016–2019: Danok Bat
- 2019–2021: Athletic Bilbao

Senior career*
Years	Team	Apps	(Gls)
2021–2022	Basconia	31	(5)
2022–2025	Bilbao Athletic	35	(2)
2023–2026	Athletic Bilbao	83	(4)
2026–	Udinese	9	(0)

International career^{‡}
2024–	Spain U21	1	(0)
2026–	Basque Country	1	(0)
- * Club domestic league appearances and goals as of 23:56, 31 October 2026 (UTC) ‡ National team caps and goals as of 14 November 2026

Unai Gómez Etxebarria (born 25 May 2003) is a Spanish professional footballer who plays as an attacking midfielder for Serie A club Udinese.

== Club career ==
=== Athletic Bilbao ===
Born in Bermeo, Biscay, Basque Country, Gómez joined Athletic Bilbao's youth setup in 2013 from hometown side Bermeo. He left in 2016, and spent three years with Danok Bat before returning to the Lezama Facilities in 2019.

Gómez was promoted to the farm team in the Tercera División RFEF on 19 July 2021, and made his senior debut on 5 September, starting in a 0–0 away draw against Barakaldo. He scored his first senior goal on 21 November, netting the winner in a 1–0 home success over Santutxu.

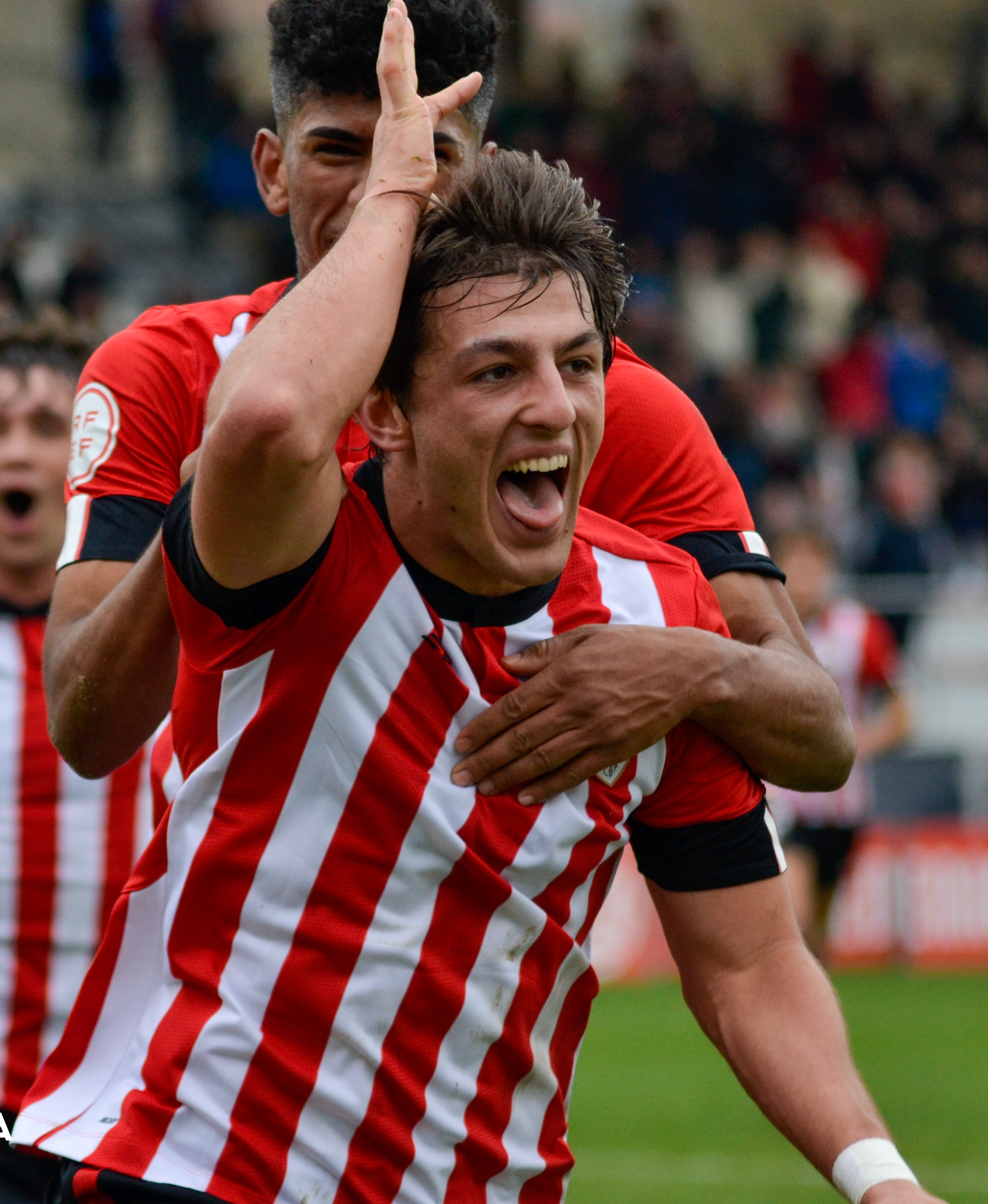
Gómez celebrating a goal with Bilbao Athletic in 2023

Gómez was promoted to the reserves on 10 July 2022, and made his first appearance for the side on 28 August by coming on as a second-half substitute for Ewan Urain in a 2–1 Primera Federación home loss against La Nucía. He scored his first goals for the B-side on 29 January 2023, netting a brace in a 3–0 home win over Logroñés.

In the summer of 2023, he was one of the players chosen to do the preseason with the senior squad, where he was one of the most outstanding performers. In addition, within the first few minutes of his first friendly match as a starter, he scored a goal against Celtic. On 12 August 2023, he made his full La Liga debut at the San Mamés in a defeat against Real Madrid. On 27 August, he scored his first professional goal to seal a 4–2 victory against Real Betis. On 20 October, he renewed his contract with Athletic until June 2028. On 20 December, he scored with a header following a save by Álvaro Valles, to secure a 1–0 victory over Las Palmas in the 94th minute.

=== Udinese ===
On 8 July 2026, Serie A club Udinese announced the signing of Gómez on a five-year contract.

== International career ==
On 15 March 2024, Gómez was called up by under-21 coach Santi Denia for two qualifying matches for the Under-21 European Championship against Slovakia and Belgium.

== Career statistics ==
As of 19 July 2026

Appearances and goals by club, season and competition
Club	Season	League			Copa del Rey		Europe		Other		Total	
Club	Season	Division	Apps	Goals	Apps	Goals	Apps	Goals	Apps	Goals	Apps	Goals
Basconia	2021–22	Tercera División RFEF	33	5	—		—		—		33	5
Bilbao Athletic	2022–23	Primera Federación	34	2	—		—		—		34	2
Bilbao Athletic	2023–24	Segunda Federación	1	0	—		—		—		1	0
Bilbao Athletic	Total		35	2	—		—		—		35	2
Athletic Bilbao	2023–24	La Liga	25	2	8	0	—		—		33	2
Athletic Bilbao	2024–25	La Liga	32	1	1	0	13 (Note: Appearances in UEFA Europa League)	1	1 (Note: Appearance in Supercopa de España)	0	47	2
Athletic Bilbao	2025–26	La Liga	26	1	3	1	7 (Note: Appearances in UEFA Champions League)	0	1	0	37	2
Athletic Bilbao	Total		83	4	12	1	20	1	2	0	116	6
Career total			151	11	12	1	20	1	2	0	185	13

== Honours ==
Athletic Bilbao

- Copa del Rey: 2023–24
