= Adama Boiro =

Spanish footballer (born 2002)

Personal information
- Full name: Adama Boiro Boiro
- Date of birth: 22 June 2002 (age 24)
- Place of birth: Dakar, Senegal
- Height: 1.83 m (6 ft 0 in)
- Position: Left-back

Team information
- Current team: West Ham United (on loan from Athletic Bilbao)
- Number: 18

Youth career
- San Jorge
- Ardoi
- Osasuna

Senior career*
Years	Team	Apps	(Gls)
2021–2024	Osasuna B	67	(1)
2024	Athletic Bilbao B	13	(1)
2024–	Athletic Bilbao	33	(0)
2026–	→ West Ham United (loan)	1	(0)
- * Club domestic league appearances and goals as of 17:38, 5 September 2026 (UTC)

Adama Boiro Boiro (born 22 June 2002) is a professional footballer who plays as a left-back for EFL Championship club West Ham United, on loan from La Liga club Athletic Bilbao.

== Early life ==
Born in Dakar, Senegal, to parents originally from Guinea, Boiro moved with his family to Spain at the age of four.

== Club career ==
Boiro started his senior career with CA Osasuna's reserves, where he made his debut on 11 September 2021 in a 1–0 away win against CD Laredo in the Segunda Federación. He came to be regarded as one of their most important players, and a prospect for the senior team.

On 24 January 2024, Boiro signed a five-and-a-half-year contract with Athletic Bilbao after the club paid his €2 million minimum fee release clause; he was initially assigned to the B side, also in the fourth division. He played his first match in a 0–0 draw at UD Barbastro a few days after arriving.

Boiro's maiden appearance in La Liga occurred on 28 August 2024, when he featured for 79 minutes of the 1–0 home victory over Valencia CF. Three months later, in his first UEFA Europa League game, he opened an eventual 3–0 defeat of IF Elfsborg in the league phase also at the San Mamés Stadium after an assist from Gorka Guruzeta in the sixth minute; he returned the favour to his teammate for the last goal.

On 1 September 2026, Boiro joined West Ham United on a season-long loan with an option to buy.

== Style of play ==
Boiro mainly operates as a left-back. He is known for his strength.

== Career statistics ==
As of match played 5 September 2026

Appearances and goals by club, season and competition
Club	Season	League			National cup (Note: Includes Copa del Rey, FA Cup)		Europe		Other		Total	
Club	Season	Division	Apps	Goals	Apps	Goals	Apps	Goals	Apps	Goals	Apps	Goals
Osasuna B	2021–22	Segunda Federación	24	1	—		—		—		24	1
Osasuna B	2022–23	Primera Federación	24	0	—		—		—		24	0
Osasuna B	2023–24	Primera Federación	19	0	—		—		—		19	0
Osasuna B	Total		67	1	—		—		—		67	1
Bilbao Athletic	2023–24	Segunda Federación	13	1	—		—		—		13	1
Athletic Bilbao	2024–25	La Liga	18	0	1	0	1 (Note: Appearance in UEFA Europa League)	1	0	0	20	1
Athletic Bilbao	2025–26	La Liga	14	0	3	0	6 (Note: Appearances in UEFA Champions League)	0	1 (Note: Appearance in Supercopa de España)	0	24	0
Athletic Bilbao	2026–27	La Liga	1	0	—		—		—		1	0
Athletic Bilbao	Total		33	0	4	0	7	0	1	0	45	1
West Ham United (loan)	2026–27	EFL Championship	1	0	0	0	—		0	0	1	0
Career total			114	2	4	0	7	1	1	0	126	3

== Honours ==
Bilbao Athletic

- Segunda Federación (Group 2): 2023–24
