= CD Basconia =

Association football club in Spain

Coordinates: 43.232904°N 2.881116°W

Basconia
- Full name: Club Deportivo Basconia
- Founded: 14 March 1913; 113 years ago
- Ground: Polideportivo de Artunduaga, Basauri, Basque Country, Spain
- Capacity: 8,500
- President: Juan Ignacio Azurmendi
- Head coach: Adrián Esteve
- League: Segunda Federación – Group 1
- 2025–26: Segunda Federación – Group 2, 10th of 18
- Website: www.cdbasconia.com
Home colours	Away colours

Club Deportivo Basconia is a Spanish football club based in Basauri, Biscay, in the autonomous community of Basque Country. Founded on 14 March 1913, it currently plays in Segunda Federación – Group 1, holding home games at the Artunduaga Sports Centre, in the town of Basauri. Years ago, Basconia used to play in the Estadio López Cortázar, which was demolished in order to build new buildings.

In 1997, they entered into a partnership with Athletic Bilbao to serve as a feeder club for Bilbao and essentially operate as the club's C team.

== History ==
Founded in 1913 and named after a local iron and steel-working works (later owned by the Altos Hornos de Vizcaya company), Basconia reached the national third level (Tercera División) thirty years later. The club played in the second tier for six seasons (1957–1963), but this was before the creation of the regionalised new third division in the 1970s.

In 1997, Basconia became Basque neighbours Athletic Bilbao's feeder club, not being eligible for promotion if the reserves, Bilbao Athletic, playing at the level above, do not attain the same goal. The primary function of the agreement is to aid the development of young players in a challenging environment while keeping them in the same group setting and tactical system under the close guidance of the parent club; a number of teenagers who spent one or two seasons at Basconia have become professionals at Athletic Bilbao, eventually playing in La Liga and UEFA competitions. In January 2020 it was confirmed that the partnership, due to expire that summer, had been renewed for another three years to 2023.

Basconia's place in Athletic's club structure means that the squad changes greatly each season. About half of the players move up to play for Bilbao Athletic, or go out on loan to other local clubs playing at Segunda Federación level. They are replaced by graduates, usually 17 or 18 years old, from the previous year's Juvenil A team. Typically the squad is expanded further with new signings from the region's youth clubs, the most notable of which are Danok Bat and Antiguoko.

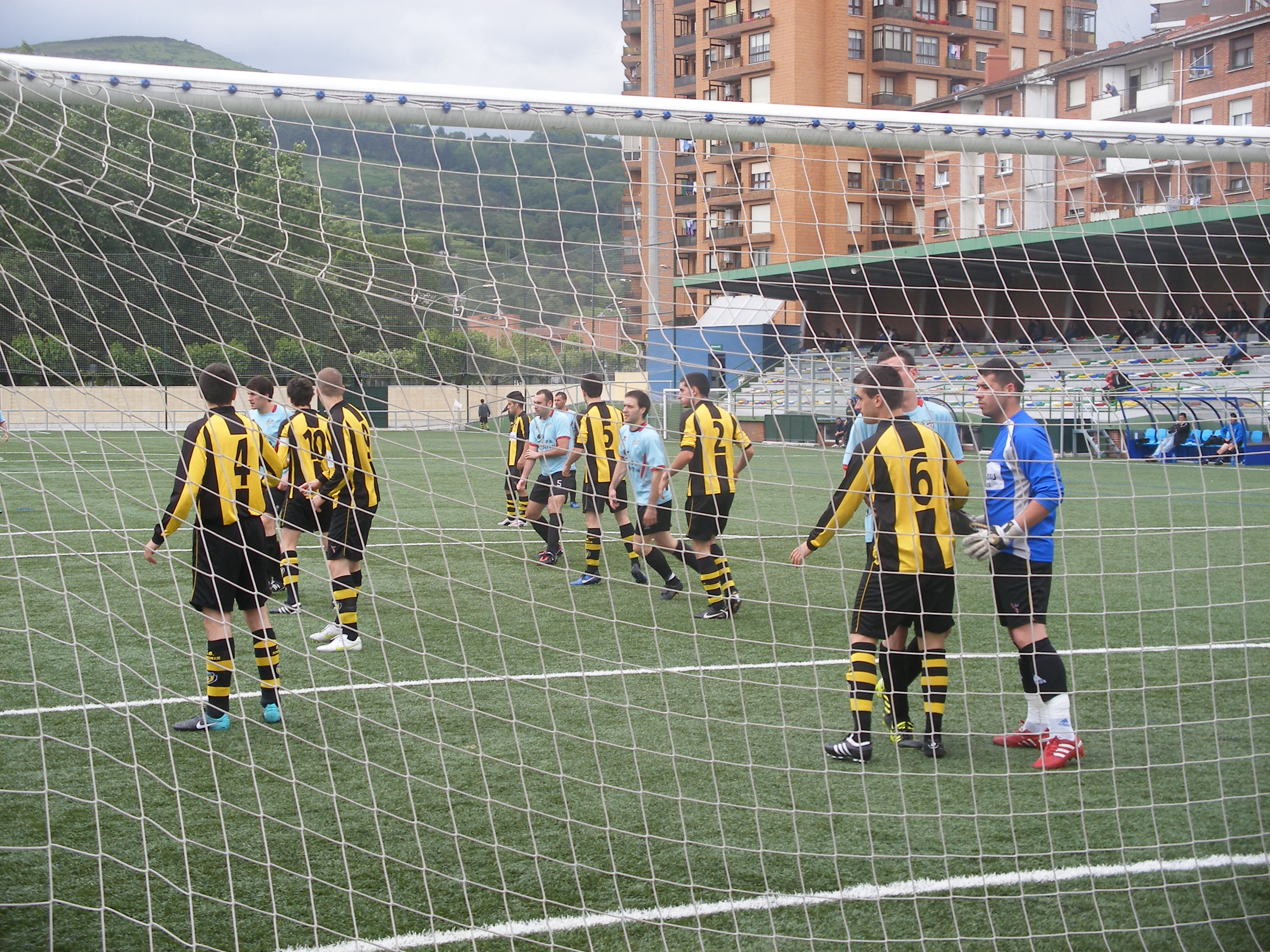
Basconia B playing at Soloarte

Although Athletic Bilbao control the main squad's players and coaching personnel, Basconia retains its own club committee and staff and operates several youth teams as well as amateur side Basconia B who compete in the Preferente de Vizcaya league, two levels below the first team. These other teams play in a separate small stadium in the town, Soloarte. Occasionally the main squad has been supplemented by some of Basconia's 'own' players in emergencies – Mikel Rico was with Basconia B when he appeared in one Tercera División fixture in 2001; he left Biscay for a long career across Spain which eventually brought him back to sign for Athletic in 2013.

In January 2018, with the team struggling to remain in the league, Basconia took the unusual step of recruiting some older, more experienced players including Thaylor Lubanzadio to help them maintain their 23-year divisional status, which was eventually accomplished – they finished 15th, 5 points above the relegation zone.

== Season to season ==
- As a separate club

Season	Tier	Division	Place	Copa del Rey
1928–29	5	2ª Reg. P.	1st	
1929–30	5	2ª Reg. P.	2nd	
1930–31	5	2ª Reg. P.	2nd	
1931–32	5	2ª Reg. P.	3rd	
1932–33	5	2ª Reg. P.	2nd	
1933–34	5	2ª Reg. P.	3rd	
1934–35	4	1ª Reg.	6th	
1935–36	4	1ª Reg.	7th	
1939–40	5	2ª Reg.	2nd	
1940–41	4	1ª Reg.	6th	
1941–42	3	1ª Reg.	7th	
1942–43	3	1ª Reg.	6th	
1943–44	4	1ª Reg.	4th	
1944–45	4	1ª Reg.	3rd	
1945–46	4	1ª Reg.	5th	
1946–47	4	1ª Reg.	14th	
1947–48	5	2ª Reg.	7th	
1948–49	5	2ª Reg.	1st	
1949–50	4	1ª Reg.	1st	
1950–51	3	3ª	13th	

Season	Tier	Division	Place	Copa del Rey
1951–52	3	3ª	9th	
1952–53	3	3ª	7th	
1953–54	3	3ª	13th	
1954–55	3	3ª	3rd	
1955–56	3	3ª	6th	
1956–57	3	3ª	1st	
1957–58	2	2ª	8th	
1958–59	2	2ª	5th	Round of 32
1959–60	2	2ª	11th	Preliminary
1960–61	2	2ª	8th	First round
1961–62	2	2ª	15th	Round of 16
1962–63	2	2ª	15th	Preliminary
1963–64	3	3ª	7th	
1964–65	3	3ª	10th	
1965–66	3	3ª	5th	
1966–67	3	3ª	7th	
1967–68	3	3ª	6th	
1968–69	3	3ª	12th	
1969–70	3	3ª	8th	Second round
1970–71	3	3ª	6th	

Season	Tier	Division	Place	Copa del Rey
1971–72	3	3ª	4th	First round
1972–73	3	3ª	15th	First round
1973–74	3	3ª	12th	First round
1974–75	3	3ª	14th	Third round
1975–76	3	3ª	16th	Second round
1976–77	3	3ª	10th	First round
1977–78	3	2ª B	20th	First round
1978–79	4	3ª	20th	Second round
1979–80	5	Reg. Pref.	4th	
1980–81	5	Reg. Pref.	1st	
1981–82	4	3ª	3rd	
1982–83	4	3ª	4th	First round
1983–84	4	3ª	8th	First round

Season	Tier	Division	Place	Copa del Rey
1984–85	4	3ª	1st	
1985–86	4	3ª	4th	Second round
1986–87	4	3ª	2nd	Second round
1987–88	3	2ª B	6th	Third round
1988–89	3	2ª B	14th	First round
1989–90	3	2ª B	15th	
1990–91	3	2ª B	9th	Third round
1991–92	3	2ª B	13th	Third round
1992–93	3	2ª B	7th	Third round
1993–94	3	2ª B	17th	First round
1994–95	4	3ª	7th	
1995–96	4	3ª	14th	
1996–97	4	3ª	10th	

- As a farm team

Season	Tier	Division	Place
1997–98	4	3ª	1st
1998–99	4	3ª	7th
1999–2000	4	3ª	5th
2000–01	4	3ª	6th
2001–02	4	3ª	7th
2002–03	4	3ª	1st
2003–04	4	3ª	3rd
2004–05	4	3ª	8th
2005–06	4	3ª	4th
2006–07	4	3ª	5th
2007–08	4	3ª	5th
2008–09	4	3ª	7th
2009–10	4	3ª	10th
2010–11	4	3ª	8th
2011–12	4	3ª	10th
2012–13	4	3ª	12th
2013–14	4	3ª	4th
2014–15	4	3ª	16th
2015–16	4	3ª	14th
2016–17	4	3ª	10th

Season	Tier	Division	Place
2017–18	4	3ª	15th
2018–19	4	3ª	6th
2019–20	4	3ª	4th
2020–21	4	3ª	4th
2021–22	5	3ª RFEF	5th
2022–23	5	3ª Fed.	4th
2023–24	5	3ª Fed.	2nd
2024–25	5	3ª Fed.	1st
2025–26	4	2ª Fed.	10th
2026–27	4	2ª Fed.	

- 6 seasons in Segunda División
- 8 seasons in Segunda División B
- 2 seasons in Segunda Federación
- 55 seasons in Tercera División
- 4 seasons in Tercera Federación/Tercera División RFEF

== Current squad ==
As of 10 September 2026

Note: Flags indicate national team as defined under FIFA eligibility rules; some limited exceptions apply. Players may hold more than one non-FIFA nationality.

No.	Pos.	Nation	Player
1	GK	ESP	Tasio Juanena
2	DF	ESP	Oier Unamuno
3	DF	ESP	Ricardo Mendiguren
4	DF	ESP	Álex Carril
5	DF	COL	Iker Quintero
6	MF	ESP	Unax Goyogana
7	FW	ESP	Marcos Goñi
8	MF	ESP	Egoitz Hernández
9	FW	ESP	Xabi Goméz
10	MF	ESP	Eneko Ellakuria
11	FW	ESP	Diego Fernández
12	FW	ESP	Unai Gayogoña
13	GK	ESP	Iker Pagazartundua
14	MF	ESP	Aitor Santován
15	DF	PER	Aitor León

No.	Pos.	Nation	Player
16	FW	ESP	Daniel Navarte
17	FW	COD	Manasse Kiese
18	MF	USA	Xanti Oyharçabal
19	FW	BOL	Asier Torres
20	FW	ESP	Aitor Torrico
21	MF	CUB	Iñigo Sainz
22	DF	NGR	Testimony Onukwuru
23	FW	ESP	Alain Cobos
24	DF	ESP	Pablo Martínez
25	GK	ESP	Zugatz Gallastegi
26	MF	ESP	Ander Ezpeleta
27	DF	ESP	Mikel Urrestarazu
28	DF	ESP	Urko Liceaga
29	FW	DOM	Ismahel Saidani
30	FW	ESP	Unax Urzaiz

=== Out on loan ===
Note: Flags indicate national team as defined under FIFA eligibility rules; some limited exceptions apply. Players may hold more than one non-FIFA nationality.

No.	Pos.	Nation	Player
—	MF	ESP	Mikel Zearreta (at Sestao River Club until 30 June 2027)

== Honours ==
- Tercera División

Winners: (Note: Third tier) 1956–57 (Note: Promoted in play-offs)
Winners (3): (Note: Fourth tier) 1984–85, (Note: Not promoted in play-offs) 1997–98, (Note: Won group in play-offs, but ineligible for promotion as Bilbao Athletic did not gain promotion from the level above (they too made the playoffs but finished third)) 2002–03 (Note: Not promoted in play-offs, and would have been ineligible as Bilbao Athletic did not gain promotion from the level above)

== Selected coaches ==
- (Spain) Javier Clemente
- (Spain) Joseba Etxeberria
- (Spain) José Luis Mendilibar

== Notable players ==
Note: this list contains players who have appeared in at least 50 league games for the first team or have reached international status.

- (Spain) Julen Agirrezabala
- (Spain) Yeray Álvarez
- (Venezuela) Fernando Amorebieta
- (Spain) Daniel Aranzubia
- (Spain) José Argoitia (Note: While the club operated independently (pre-1997).)
- (Spain) Joseba Arriaga
- (Spain) Kepa Arrizabalaga
- (Spain) Beñat Etxebarria
- (Spain) Eneko Bóveda
- (Spain) Javier Casas
- (Spain) Iñigo Córdoba
- (Spain) Koldo Etxeberria
- (Spain) Borja Ekiza
- (Spain) Unai Expósito
- (Romania) Cristian Ganea (Note: Youth teams only.)
- (Spain) Unai Gómez
- (Spain) Carlos Gurpegi
- (Spain) Iago Herrerín
- (Spain) Gorka Iraizoz
- (Spain) Andoni Iraola
- (Spain) José Ángel Iribar
- (Spain) Ander Iturraspe
- (Spain) Mikel Jauregizar
- (Spain) Aymeric Laporte
- (Spain) Enrique Larrinaga
- (Spain) Iñigo Lekue
- (Spain) Fernando Llorente
- (Spain) Unai López
- (Spain) Sabin Merino
- (Spain) Unai Núñez
- (Spain) Aitor Paredes
- (Spain) Beñat Prados
- (Spain) Luis Prieto
- (Spain) Iñigo Ruiz de Galarreta
- (Spain) Mikel Rico
- (Spain) Unai Simón
- (Spain) Markel Susaeta
- (Spain) Ustaritz
- (Spain) Óscar Vales
- (Spain) Asier Villalibre
- (Spain) Dani Vivian
- (Ghana) Iñaki Williams
- (Spain) Nico Williams
- (Spain) Francisco Yeste

== See also ==
- Athletic Bilbao (first team)
- Bilbao Athletic (B team)
