= 2024 Copa del Rey final =

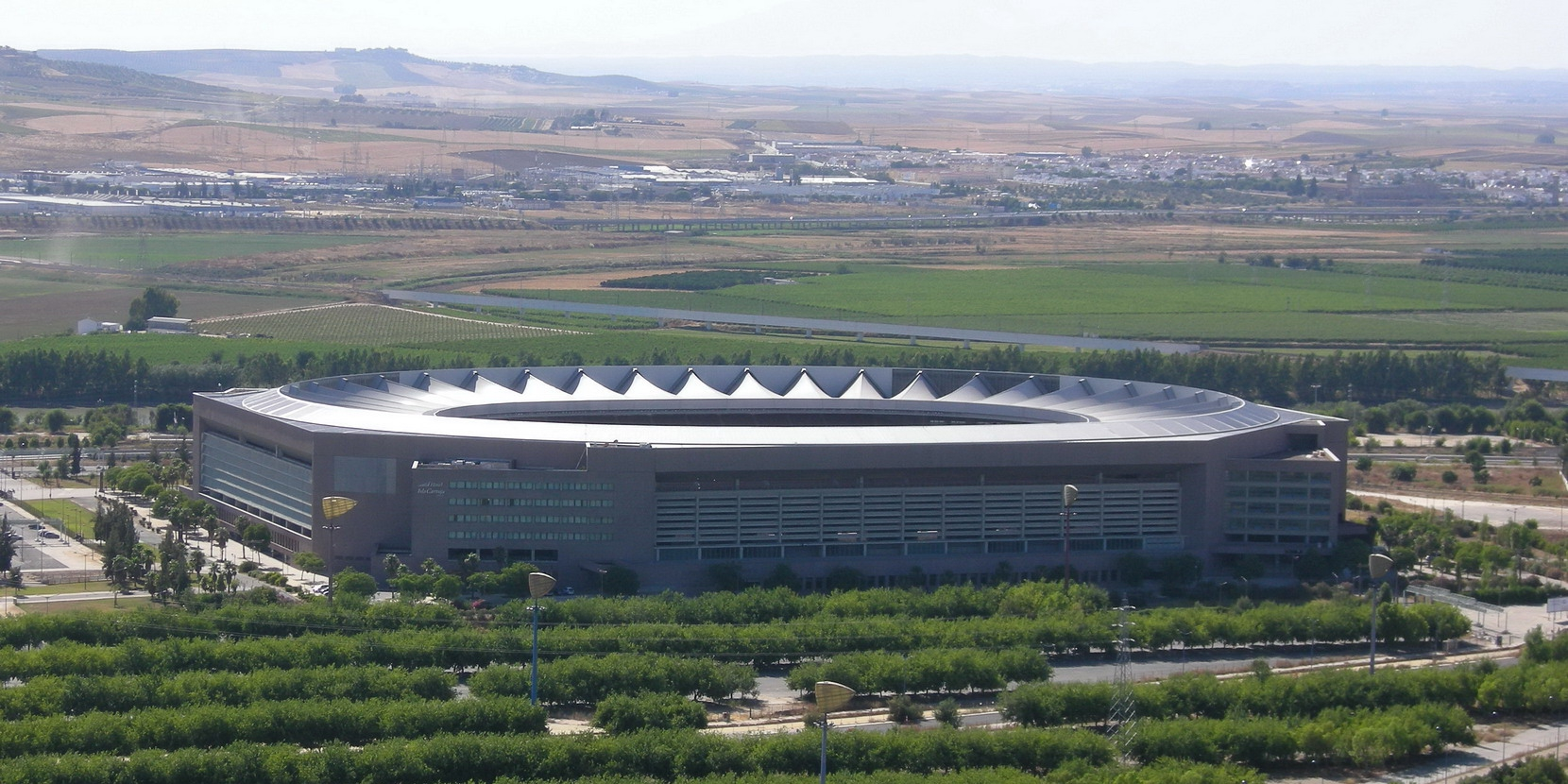
- Estadio de La Cartuja in Seville hosted the final.
- Event: 2023–24 Copa del Rey
Athletic Bilbao	Mallorca
1	1
- After extra time Athletic Bilbao won 4–2 on penalties
- Date: 6 April 2024
- Venue: Estadio de La Cartuja, Seville
- Man of the Match: Nico Williams (Athletic Bilbao)
- Referee: José Luis Munuera Montero
- Attendance: 57,619

The 2024 Copa del Rey final was a football match to decide the winners of the 2023–24 Copa del Rey, the 122nd edition of Spain's primary football cup (including two seasons where two rival editions were played). The match was played on 6 April 2024 at Estadio de La Cartuja in Seville between Athletic Bilbao and Mallorca.

Mallorca played in their first final since their only victory in 2003, having lost twice prior. This was Athletic Bilbao's 40th final, (Note: Athletic Club's own records also include a win in the 1902 Copa de la Coronación final and a defeat in the 1907 Copa del Rey final in which the participating team was Club Vizcaya, a combination of players from Athletic and other local teams (Bilbao Football Club and Unión Vizcaino, respectively).) having last appeared in the final in 2021, and its last victory was in 1984.

Following a 1–1 draw after extra time, Athletic Bilbao won 4–2 on penalties to secure a 24th Copa del Rey title, ending a 40-year major trophy drought.

== Route to the final ==
Athletic Bilbao		Round	Mallorca
Opponent	Result		Opponent	Result
Rubí	2–1 (A)	First round	Boiro	4–0 (A)
Cayón	3–0 (A) (Note: Cayón did not play the match in their main stadium Fernando Astobiza, Cayón, as it did not meet the broadcasting requirements.)	Second round	Valle de Egüés	3–0 (A) (Note: Valle de Egüés did not play the match in their main stadium Sarriguren, Egüés, as it did not meet the broadcasting requirements.)
Eibar	3–0 (A)	Round of 32	Burgos	3–0 (A)
Alavés	2–0 (H)	Round of 16	Tenerife	1–0 (a.e.t.) (A)
Barcelona	4–2 (a.e.t.) (H)	Quarter-finals	Girona	3–2 (H)
Atlético Madrid	1–0 (A), 3–0 (H)	Semi-finals	Real Sociedad	0–0 (H), 1–1 (5–4 p) (A)

Key: (H) = Home; (A) = Away

== Match ==
=== Details ===
6 April 2024
22:00 CEST

Athletic Bilbao	1–1 (a.e.t.)	Mallorca
Sancet 50'	Report	Rodríguez 21'
Penalties
R. García (penalty scored); Muniain (penalty scored); Vesga (penalty scored); Berenguer (penalty scored)	4–2	(penalty scored) Muriqi; (penalty missed) Morlanes; (penalty missed) Radonjić; (penalty scored) Sánchez

La Cartuja, Seville
Attendance: 57,619
Referee: José Luis Munuera Montero

Athletic Bilbao	Mallorca

GK	13	(Spain) Julen Agirrezabala
RB	18	(Spain) Óscar de Marcos (c)
CB	3	(Spain) Dani Vivian
CB	4	(Spain) Aitor Paredes	(yellow card) 27'
LB	17	(Spain) Yuri Berchiche		(substituted off) 105+1'
CM	16	(Spain) Iñigo Ruiz de Galarreta		(substituted off) 80'
CM	24	(Spain) Beñat Prados		(substituted off) 46'
RW	9	(Ghana) Iñaki Williams		(substituted off) 91'
AM	8	(Spain) Oihan Sancet		(substituted off) 91'
LW	11	(Spain) Nico Williams
CF	12	(Spain) Gorka Guruzeta		(substituted off) 91'
Substitutes:
GK	1	(Spain) Unai Simón
DF	19	(Spain) Imanol García de Albéniz
MF	6	(Spain) Mikel Vesga		(substituted on) 46'
MF	7	(Spain) Álex Berenguer		(substituted on) 91'
MF	14	(Spain) Dani García
MF	15	(Spain) Iñigo Lekue		(substituted on) 105+1'
MF	21	(Spain) Ander Herrera
MF	30	(Spain) Unai Gómez		(substituted on) 80'
FW	10	(Spain) Iker Muniain		(substituted on) 91'
FW	20	(Spain) Asier Villalibre
FW	22	(Spain) Raúl García		(substituted on) 91'
Manager:
(Spain) Ernesto Valverde

GK	13	(Slovakia) Dominik Greif
RB	20	(Uruguay) Giovanni González
CB	24	(Slovakia) Martin Valjent		(substituted off) 91'
CB	21	(Spain) Antonio Raíllo (c)
CB	6	(Spain) José Manuel Copete		(substituted off) 105+3'
LB	3	(Spain) Toni Lato		(substituted off) 110'
CM	10	(Spain) Sergi Darder		(substituted off) 62'
CM	12	(Portugal) Samú Costa
CM	14	(Spain) Dani Rodríguez		(substituted off) 73'
CF	17	(Canada) Cyle Larin		(substituted off) 62'
CF	7	(Kosovo) Vedat Muriqi	(yellow card) 90+1'
Substitutes:
GK	1	(Serbia) Predrag Rajković
GK	25	(Spain) Iván Cuéllar
DF	2	(Serbia) Matija Nastasić		(substituted on) 105+3'
DF	4	(Belgium) Siebe Van der Heyden		(substituted on) 110'
DF	11	(Spain) Jaume Costa
DF	15	(Spain) Pablo Maffeo		(substituted on) 91'
MF	5	(Equatorial Guinea) Omar Mascarell
MF	8	(Spain) Manu Morlanes		(substituted on) 62'
MF	18	(Spain) Antonio Sánchez		(substituted on) 62'
FW	9	(Spain) Abdón Prats
FW	23	(Serbia) Nemanja Radonjić	(yellow card) 119'	(substituted on) 73'
Manager:
(Mexico) Javier Aguirre

Man of the Match:
Nico Williams (Athletic Bilbao)

Assistant referees:
Íñigo Prieto López de Cerain
Diego Barbero Sevilla
Fourth official:
Alejandro Muñiz Ruiz
Reserve assistant referee:
Antonio Ramón Martínez Moreno
Video assistant referee:
Eduardo Prieto Iglesias
Assistant video assistant referees:
Santiago Jaime Latre
Miguel Ángel Ortiz Arias

Match rules

- 90 minutes.
- 30 minutes of extra time if necessary.
- Penalty shoot-out if scores still level.
- Eleven named substitutes.
- Maximum of five substitutions, with a sixth allowed in extra time. (Note: Each team was given only three opportunities to make substitutions, with a fourth opportunity in extra time, excluding substitutions made at half-time, before the start of extra time and at half-time in extra time.)
