= 2022–23 Athletic Bilbao season =

Athletic Bilbao
2022–23 season
- President: Jon Uriarte
- Head coach: Ernesto Valverde
- Stadium: San Mamés
- La Liga: 8th
- Copa del Rey: Semi-finals
- Top goalscorer: League: Oihan Sancet; Iñaki Williams (10 each); All: Iñaki Williams (11)
Home colours	Away colours	Third colours

The 2022–23 season was the 124th season in the history of Athletic Bilbao and their 92nd consecutive season in the top flight. The club participated in La Liga and the Copa del Rey.

== Players ==
=== First-team squad ===
As of 31 January 2023

Note: Flags indicate national team as defined under FIFA eligibility rules; some limited exceptions apply. Players may hold more than one non-FIFA nationality.

No.	Pos.	Nation	Player
1	GK	ESP	Unai Simón
2	FW	ESP	Jon Morcillo
3	DF	ESP	Daniel Vivian
4	DF	ESP	Iñigo Martínez
5	DF	ESP	Yeray Álvarez
6	MF	ESP	Mikel Vesga
7	FW	ESP	Álex Berenguer
8	MF	ESP	Oihan Sancet
9	FW	GHA	Iñaki Williams
10	FW	ESP	Iker Muniain (captain)
11	FW	ESP	Nico Williams
12	FW	ESP	Gorka Guruzeta
13	GK	ESP	Julen Agirrezabala
14	MF	ESP	Dani García

No.	Pos.	Nation	Player
15	DF	ESP	Iñigo Lekue
16	MF	ESP	Unai Vencedor
17	DF	ESP	Yuri Berchiche
18	DF	ESP	Óscar de Marcos (vice-captain)
19	MF	ESP	Oier Zarraga
21	DF	ESP	Ander Capa
22	FW	ESP	Raúl García (3rd captain)
23	MF	ESP	Ander Herrera (on loan from Paris Saint-Germain)
24	DF	ESP	Mikel Balenziaga
27	GK	ESP	Álex Padilla
28	FW	ESP	Luis Bilbao
29	FW	ESP	Adu Ares
31	DF	ESP	Aitor Paredes
35	GK	ESP	Ander Iru

== Transfers ==
=== In ===
Date	Player	From	Type	Fee	Ref.
3 July 2022	(Spain) Gorka Guruzeta	Amorebieta	Transfer	Undisclosed	
27 August 2022	(Spain) Ander Herrera	(France) Paris Saint-Germain	Loan		

=== Out ===
Date	Player	To	Type	Fee	Ref.
4 July 2022	(Spain) Jokin Ezkieta	Released			
7 July 2022	(Spain) Juan Artola	Burgos	Loan		
7 July 2022	(Spain) Iñigo Córdoba	Released			
13 July 2022	(Mali) Youssouf Diarra	Córdoba	Transfer	Undisclosed	
13 July 2022	(Spain) Iñigo Vicente	Released			
14 July 2022	(Spain) Imanol	Eibar	Loan		
14 July 2022	(Spain) Beñat Prados	Mirandés	Loan		
16 July 2022	(Spain) Unai Núñez	Celta Vigo	Loan		
10 August 2022	(Spain) Álex Petxarroman	Andorra	Loan		
11 August 2022	(Spain) Nico Serrano	Mirandés	Loan		
26 August 2022	(Spain) Peru Nolaskoain	Eibar	Loan		

== Pre-season and friendlies ==
Win Draw Loss Fixtures

17 July 2022 Cup der Traditionen	Athletic Bilbao	0–0	Borussia Mönchengladbach	Duisburg, Germany
17:00 CEST (UTC+2)		Report		Stadium: MSV-Arena; Referee: Lars Aarts (Germany)
Note: Match was one period of 45 minutes.

17 July 2022 Cup der Traditionen	MSV Duisburg	1–1	Athletic Bilbao	Duisburg, Germany
18:00 CEST (UTC+2)	Ajani 35'; Frey (penalty missed) 38'	Report	Serrano 20'	Stadium: MSV-Arena; Referee: Lars Aarts (Germany)
Note: Match was one period of 45 minutes.

21 July 2022 Friendly	VfL Bochum	1–4	Athletic Bilbao	Gütersloh, Germany
18:00 CEST (UTC+2)	Zoller 58'	Report	Vesga (yellow card) 38'; R. García 65'; Villalibre 82', 88'; I. Williams 84'	Stadium: Heidewaldstadion; Referee: Florian Exner (Germany)

23 July 2022 Friendly	Mainz 05	1–1	Athletic Bilbao	Mainz, Germany
17:00 CEST (UTC+2)	Fernandes 120+1'	Report	N. Williams 40'	Stadium: Mewa Arena; Attendance: 5,300; Referee: Patrick Alt (Germany)
Note: Match was played in two 60-minute halves.

30 July 2022 Friendly	Newcastle United	2–1	Athletic Bilbao	Newcastle upon Tyne, England
15:00 BST (UTC+1)	Wilson 4'; Saint-Maximin 54'	Report	R. García 64'	Stadium: St James' Park; Attendance: 46,856; Referee: Jarred Gillett (England)

31 July 2022 Friendly	Mirandés	0–3	Athletic Bilbao	Miranda de Ebro
19:30 CEST (UTC+2)	Caropitche (yellow card) 72'	Report	Nolaskoain 38', (yellow card) 65'; Villalibre 60', 84'	Stadium: Estadio Municipal de Anduva

5 August 2022 EH Txapela	Athletic Bilbao	1–0	Real Sociedad	Barakaldo
20:45 CEST (UTC+2)	Vesga 22'	Report	Rico (yellow card) 52' (yellow-red card) 71'	Stadium: Estadio Lasesarre; Referee: Ricardo de Burgos Bengoetxea

6 August 2022 Friendly	Athletic Bilbao	1–1	Alavés	Lezama
11:00 CEST (UTC+2)	Villalibre 24'	Report	Sylla 84'	Stadium: Lezama Facilities; Attendance: 0 Referee: Gorka Etayo Herrera

6 December 2022 Friendly	Athletic Bilbao	2–0	Real Valladolid	Miranda de Ebro
12:00 CET (UTC+1)	Guruzeta 27'; Sancet 51'	Report		Stadium: Estadio Municipal de Anduva; Referee: Gorka Mazo Maruri

11 December 2022 Trofeo Árbol de Gernika; First leg	Athletic Bilbao	2–0	Guadalajara	Bilbao
19:00 CET (UTC+1)	Berenguer 29'; Sancet 59'	Report		Stadium: San Mamés; Attendance: 17,524; Referee: Pablo González Fuertes

15 December 2022 Friendly	Burgos	0–3	Athletic Bilbao	Burgos
19:30 CET (UTC+1)		Report	Guruzeta 3', 50'; R. García 58'	Stadium: El Plantío; Referee: Valentín Pizarro Gómez

18 December 2022 Friendly	Udinese	0–1	Athletic Bilbao	Udine
19:00 CET (UTC+1)		Report	I. Williams 86'	Stadium: Stadio Friuli; Referee: Giovanni Ayroldi

== Competitions ==
=== Overall record ===
Competition	First match	Last match	Starting round	Final position	Record							
Competition	First match	Last match	Starting round	Final position	Pld	W	D	L	GF	GA	GD	Win %
La Liga	15 August 2022	4 June 2023	Matchday 1	8th	38	14	9	15	47	43	+4	36.84
Copa del Rey	13 November 2022	4 April 2023	First round	Semi-finals	7	5	1	1	14	4	+10	71.43
Total					45	19	10	16	61	47	+14	42.22

Source: Soccerway

=== La Liga ===
==== League table ====
Pos	Team	Pld	W	D	L	GF	GA	GD	Pts	Qualification or relegation
6	Real Betis	38	17	9	12	46	41	+5	60	Qualification for the Europa League group stage
7	Osasuna	38	15	8	15	37	42	−5	53	Qualification for the Europa Conference League play-off round (Note: Osasuna were initially disqualified from the 2023–24 UEFA Europa Conference League due to historic match-fixing. However, the club became later eligible to participate after an evidence of innocence had been provided.)
8	Athletic Bilbao	38	14	9	15	47	43	+4	51	
9	Mallorca	38	14	8	16	37	43	−6	50	
10	Girona	38	13	10	15	58	55	+3	49 (Note: Head-to-head points: Girona 8, Rayo Vallecano 6, Sevilla 1.)	

Source: LaLiga Santander
Rules for classification: 1) Points; 2) Head-to-head points; 3) Head-to-head goal difference; 4) Goal difference; 5) Goals scored; 6) Fair-play points (Note: Head-to-head record is used only after all the matches between the teams in question have been played)

==== Results summary ====
Overall								Home						Away					
Pld	W	D	L	GF	GA	GD	Pts	W	D	L	GF	GA	GD	W	D	L	GF	GA	GD
38	14	9	15	47	43	+4	51	8	3	8	22	15	+7	6	6	7	25	28	−3

Source: La Liga

==== Results by round ====
Round	1	2	3	4	5	6	7	8	9	10	11	12	13	14	15	16	17	18	19	20	21	22	23	24	25	26	27	28	29	30	31	32	33	34	35	36	37	38
Ground	H	H	A	H	A	H	H	A	H	A	A	H	A	H	A	H	A	H	A	H	A	A	H	A	H	A	H	A	H	A	H	A	H	A	H	A	H	A
Result	D	W	W	L	W	W	W	D	L	D	L	W	L	W	D	D	L	L	L	W	W	L	L	D	L	W	D	W	W	W	L	D	L	L	W	L	L	D
Position	10	7	4	6	6	4	3	3	6	6	6	6	7	4	5	7	8	8	9	8	7	7	9	9	9	7	7	7	7	7	7	7	8	8	7	8	8	8

Source: La Liga
A = Away; H = Home; W = Win; D = Draw; L = Loss

==== Matches ====
The league fixtures were announced on 23 June 2022.

15 August 2022 1	Athletic Bilbao	0–0	Mallorca	Bilbao
17:30 CEST (UTC+2)		Report	Copete (yellow card) 22'; Battaglia (yellow card) 31'; Rodríguez (yellow card) 35'; Sánchez (yellow card) 66'; Lee (yellow card) 71'; Grenier (yellow card) 76'	Stadium: San Mamés; Attendance: 39,747; Referee: Javier Iglesias Villanueva

21 August 2022 2	Athletic Bilbao	1–0	Valencia	Bilbao
17:30 CEST (UTC+2)	Berenguer 42'; Vivian (yellow card) 12'; Muniain (yellow card) 68'; Simón (yellow card) 79'; Berchiche (yellow card) 86'; Yeray (yellow card) 89'	Report	Musah (yellow card) 23'; Diakhaby (yellow card) 73'	Stadium: San Mamés; Attendance: 43,333; Referee: César Soto Grado

29 August 2022 3	Cádiz	0–4	Athletic Bilbao	Cádiz
20:00 CEST (UTC+2)	Espino (yellow card) 16'; Alejo (yellow card) 60'	Report	I. Williams 24', (penalty missed) 36'; Lekue (yellow card) 39'; Guruzeta 56', 90+3'; Berenguer 78'	Stadium: Nuevo Mirandilla; Attendance: 17,029; Referee: Miguel Ángel Ortiz Arias

4 September 2022 4	Athletic Bilbao	0–1	Espanyol	Bilbao
16:15 CEST (UTC+2)	Sancet (yellow card) 54'; De Marcos (yellow card) 90'; Vencedor (yellow card) 90+3'	Report	Cabrera (yellow card) 45+3'; Braithwaite 83'; D. Gómez (yellow card) 90+1'	Stadium: San Mamés; Attendance: 41,574; Referee: Juan Martínez Munuera

11 September 2022 5	Elche	1–4	Athletic Bilbao	Elche
16:15 CEST (UTC+2)	Mascarell (yellow card) 30'; Roco (yellow card) 44'; Ponce 59'; Bigas (yellow card) 69'	Report	N. Fernández 9' (o.g.); Sancet 14' (pen.); N. Williams 22'; Berenguer 44'	Stadium: Martínez Valero; Attendance: 24,176; Referee: Mario Melero López

17 September 2022 6	Athletic Bilbao	3–2	Rayo Vallecano	Bilbao
21:00 CEST (UTC+2)	I. Williams 14'; Sancet 28'; N. Williams 33'; D. García (yellow card) 45'	Report	Trejo 5'; Valentín (yellow card) 21'; Ciss (yellow card) 67'; Falcao 80'	Stadium: San Mamés; Attendance: 43,484; Referee: Antonio Mateu Lahoz

30 September 2022 7	Athletic Bilbao	4–0	Almería	Bilbao
21:00 CEST (UTC+2)	I. Williams 10'; Sancet 17'; Yeray (yellow card) 37'; N. Williams 62'; Vesga 84' (pen.)	Report	Robertone (yellow card) 40'; Kaiky (yellow card) 57'; Puigmal (yellow card) 82'	Stadium: San Mamés; Attendance: 42,110; Referee: Juan Luis Pulido Santana

8 October 2022 8	Sevilla	1–1	Athletic Bilbao	Seville
18:30 CEST (UTC+2)	Torres 4'; Isco (yellow card) 38'; Telles (yellow card) 39'; Carmona (yellow card) 58'; Acuña (yellow card) 72'	Report	Vesga 73'; Herrera (red card) 90+4'	Stadium: Ramón Sánchez Pizjuán; Attendance: 36,502; Referee: Jesús Gil Manzano

15 October 2022 9	Athletic Bilbao	0–1	Atlético Madrid	Bilbao
21:00 CEST (UTC+2)		Report	Giménez (yellow card) 36'; Griezmann 47'; Morata (yellow card) 57'; Oblak (yellow card) 68'; Saúl (yellow card) 85'; Witsel (yellow card) 90+2'; Grbić (yellow card) 90+5'	Stadium: San Mamés; Attendance: 48,391; Referee: Jorge Figueroa Vázquez

18 October 2022 10	Getafe	2–2	Athletic Bilbao	Getafe
20:00 CEST (UTC+2)	Iglesias (yellow card) 14'; Suárez (yellow card) 19'; Duarte (yellow card) 25'; Aleñá 27', (yellow card) 31'; Mata (yellow card) 45+1'; Munir 76'; Algobia (yellow card) 90+1'	Report	I. Williams 2'; Sancet (yellow card) 18'; R. García 62'; Herrera (yellow card) 64'; Zarraga (yellow card) 80'; Martínez (yellow card) 90+2'	Stadium: Coliseum Alfonso Pérez; Attendance: 11,395; Referee: José Luis Munuera Montero

23 October 2022 11	Barcelona	4–0	Athletic Bilbao	Barcelona
21:00 CEST (UTC+2)	Dembélé 12'; Roberto 18'; Lewandowski 22'; Busquets (yellow card) 71'; Torres 73'; García (yellow card) 78'	Report	De Marcos (yellow card) 16'; Vesga (yellow card) 89'	Stadium: Camp Nou; Attendance: 84,817; Referee: Juan Martínez Munuera

30 October 2022 12	Athletic Bilbao	1–0	Villarreal	Bilbao
18:30 CET (UTC+1)	R. García (yellow card) 45'; I. Williams 59'; Vesga (yellow card) 89'	Report	Moreno (yellow card) 50'	Stadium: San Mamés; Attendance: 46,081; Referee: Miguel Ángel Ortiz Arias

4 November 2022 13	Girona	2–1	Athletic Bilbao	Girona
21:00 CET (UTC+1)	Romeu (yellow card) 52'; López 67'; Martín 75'	Report	Berchiche (yellow card) 35'; Guruzeta 78'	Stadium: Estadi Montilivi; Attendance: 11,420; Referee: Valentín Pizarro Gómez

8 November 2022 14	Athletic Bilbao	3–0	Valladolid	Bilbao
20:00 CET (UTC+1)	Guruzeta 18', 51', (yellow card) 45+1'; Herrera (yellow card) 49'; Vivian 78'; Vencedor (yellow card) 84'	Report	Monchu (yellow card) 42'	Stadium: San Mamés; Attendance: 40,072; Referee: Isidro Díaz de Mera Escuderos

29 December 2022 15	Real Betis	0–0	Athletic Bilbao	Seville
19:15 CET (UTC+1)	Joaquín (yellow card) 86'; Luiz Felipe (red card) 90+6'	Report	Vesga (yellow card) 54'; Zarraga (yellow card) 82'; Berchiche (yellow card) 86'; Vivian (yellow card) 90+3'	Stadium: Benito Villamarín; Attendance: 53,565; Referee: Alejandro Hernández Hernández

9 January 2023 16	Athletic Bilbao	0–0	Osasuna	Bilbao
21:00 CET (UTC+1)		Report	Budimir (yellow card) 65'	Stadium: San Mamés; Attendance: 39,216; Referee: Mario Melero López

14 January 2023 17	Real Sociedad	3–1	Athletic Bilbao	San Sebastián
21:00 CET (UTC+1)	Sørloth 25', (yellow card) 48'; Kubo 37', (yellow card) 38'; Zubeldia (yellow card) 52'; Oyarzabal 62' (pen.); Le Normand (yellow card) 83'; Zubimendi (yellow card) 90+3'	Report	Sancet 40'; D. García (yellow card) 43'; Yeray (red card) 60'; Vivian (yellow card) 60'	Stadium: Anoeta; Attendance: 38,229; Referee: Guillermo Cuadra Fernández

22 January 2023 18	Athletic Bilbao	0–2	Real Madrid	Bilbao
21:00 CET (UTC+1)	Berchiche (yellow card) 50'; Vivian (yellow card) 58'; Herrera (yellow card) 88'	Report	Benzema 24'; Camavinga (yellow card) 62'; Vinícius (yellow card) 79'; Kroos 90'	Stadium: San Mamés; Attendance: 49,402; Referee: José María Sánchez Martínez

29 January 2023 19	Celta Vigo	1–0	Athletic Bilbao	Vigo
18:30 CET (UTC+1)	Tapia (yellow card) 36'; Aspas 71'; Núñez (yellow card) 81'	Report	Yeray (yellow card) 61'; Zarraga (yellow card) 87'	Stadium: Balaídos; Attendance: 14,696; Referee: Isidro Díaz de Mera Escuderos

3 February 2023 20	Athletic Bilbao	4–1	Cádiz	Bilbao
21:00 CET (UTC+1)	Sancet 10', 35', 75'; Berchiche (yellow card) 30' (yellow-red card) 57'; Yeray 44'	Report	Escalante 25'; Hernández (yellow card) 84'	Stadium: San Mamés; Attendance: 43,044; Referee: Valentín Pizarro Gómez

11 February 2023 21	Valencia	1–2	Athletic Bilbao	Valencia
21:00 CET (UTC+1)	Castillejo 17', (yellow card) 61'; Duro (yellow card) 21'	Report	N. Williams 30', (yellow card) 41'; De Marcos (yellow card) 57'; Sancet 72'	Stadium: Mestalla; Attendance: 36,688; Referee: César Soto Grado

19 February 2023 22	Atlético Madrid	1–0	Athletic Bilbao	Madrid
18:30 CET (UTC+1)	Giménez (yellow card) 36'; De Paul (yellow card) 45'; Griezmann 73'	Report	D. García (yellow card) 33'; Yeray (yellow card) 55'; Vivian (yellow card) 66'	Stadium: Cívitas Metropolitano; Attendance: 61,617; Referee: Juan Martínez Munuera

26 February 2023 23	Athletic Bilbao	2–3	Girona	Bilbao
14:00 CET (UTC+1)	De Marcos (yellow card) 14'; Berchiche 35'; Yeray (yellow card) 45'; R. García (yellow card) 77', (goal) 89'; Muniain (yellow card) 85'; Paredes (yellow card) 90+5'	Report	A. García 4'; Castellanos (yellow card) 16'; De Marcos 19' (o.g.); Bueno (yellow card) 28'; Arnau (yellow card) 36'; Vesga 45+1' (o.g.); Romeu (yellow card) 72'; Gazzaniga (yellow card) 90+4'	Stadium: San Mamés; Attendance: 42,816; Referee: Isidro Díaz de Mera Escuderos

5 March 2023 24	Rayo Vallecano	0–0	Athletic Bilbao	Madrid
18:30 CET (UTC+1)	Mumin (yellow card) 21'	Report	Sancet (red card) 90+3'	Stadium: Vallecas; Attendance: 12,979; Referee: Mario Melero López

12 March 2023 25	Athletic Bilbao	0–1	Barcelona	Bilbao
21:00 CET (UTC+1)	I. Williams (yellow card) 30'; Zarraga (yellow card) 86'	Report	Raphinha 45+1'; Roberto (yellow card) 76'	Stadium: San Mamés; Attendance: 49,741; Referee: Jesús Gil Manzano

17 March 2023 26	Valladolid	1–3	Athletic Bilbao	Valladolid
21:00 CET (UTC+1)	J. Sánchez (yellow card) 6'; Larin 74', (yellow card) 88'	Report	Berchiche (yellow card) 23'; Martínez 30'; Guruzeta 57'; Vesga 78', (yellow card) 90'	Stadium: José Zorilla; Attendance: 21,707; Referee: Javier Alberola Rojas

1 April 2023 27	Athletic Bilbao	0–0	Getafe	Bilbao
16:15 CEST (UTC+2)		Report		Stadium: San Mamés; Attendance: 43,782; Referee: Javier Iglesias Villanueva

8 April 2023 28	Espanyol	1–2	Athletic Bilbao	Cornellà de Llobregat
16:15 CEST (UTC+2)	Braithwaite (yellow card) 21'; Gragera (yellow card) 53'; Gil (yellow card) 59'; Calero (yellow card) 78'; Darder 90'; Vidal (yellow card) 90+1' (yellow-red card) 90+1'	Report	De Marcos (yellow card) 21'; I. Williams 22'; D. García (yellow card) 30'; Sancet (yellow card) 44'; N. Williams 75'; Simón (yellow card) 90+4'	Stadium: RCDE Stadium; Attendance: 24,903; Referee: José Luis Munuera Montero

15 April 2023 29	Athletic Bilbao	2–0	Real Sociedad	Bilbao
16:15 CEST (UTC+2)	I. Williams 33', 70'; Capa (yellow card) 39'; Guruzeta (yellow card) 45+3'; D. García (yellow card) 47'; Yeray (yellow card) 80'; Vivian (yellow card) 83'	Report	Zubeldia (yellow card) 51'; Le Normand (yellow card) 65'	Stadium: San Mamés; Attendance: 49,287; Referee: César Soto Grado

22 April 2023 30	Almería	1–2	Athletic Bilbao	Almería
16:15 CEST (UTC+2)	Ely (yellow card) 68'; Centelles 90+2'; Pozo (yellow card) 90+4'	Report	N. Williams 9'; Sancet (yellow card) 21'; De Marcos 56'; Zarraga (yellow card) 65'; Berenguer (yellow card) 90'; Vesga (yellow card) 90+4'	Stadium: Power Horse Stadium; Attendance: 13,271; Referee: Valentín Pizarro Gómez

27 April 2023 31	Athletic Bilbao	0–1	Sevilla	Bilbao
22:00 CEST (UTC+2)	Sancet (yellow card) 82'; Yeray (yellow card) 90'; R. García (yellow card) 90+2'	Report	Lamela (yellow card) 38'; Acuña (yellow card) 38'; Ocampos (yellow card) 81', (goal) 90+2' (pen.)	Stadium: San Mamés; Attendance: 42,716; Referee: Alejandro Hernández Hernández

1 May 2023 32	Mallorca	1–1	Athletic Bilbao	Palma
19:00 CEST (UTC+2)	Raíllo (yellow card) 13'; Muriqi (yellow card) 17'; Maffeo (yellow card) 29'; Lee 58'; Ruiz de Galarreta (yellow card) 90+4'	Report	Berchiche (yellow card) 40'; N. Williams (yellow card) 63'; I. Williams 90+6' (pen.)	Stadium: Visit Mallorca Stadium; Attendance: 16,807; Referee: Jorge Figueroa Vázquez

4 May 2023 33	Athletic Bilbao	0–1	Real Betis	Bilbao
22:00 CEST (UTC+2)	De Marcos (yellow card) 49'; Vivian (red card) 90+5'	Report	Willian José 6'; Pérez (yellow card) 43'; Pezzella (yellow card) 56'; Guardado (yellow card) 82'	Stadium: San Mamés; Attendance: 43,116; Referee: Miguel Ángel Ortiz Arias

13 May 2023 34	Villarreal	5–1	Athletic Bilbao	Villarreal
18:30 CEST (UTC+2)	Capoue (yellow card) 1'; Baena 56', 90'; Jackson 37', 50'; Parejo (yellow card) 45'; Pedraza (yellow card) 58'; Paredes 61' (o.g.)	Report	Sancet 45+3' (pen.); Herrera (yellow card) 54'; Paredes (yellow card) 54'; I. Williams (yellow card) 68'	Stadium: Estadio de la Cerámica; Referee: Carlos del Cerro Grande

20 May 2023 35	Athletic Bilbao	2–1	Celta Vigo	Bilbao
16:15 CEST (UTC+2)	I. Williams 5'; Paredes (yellow card) 34'; N. Williams (yellow card) 39'; Berenguer 54'; D. García (yellow card) 82'; R. García (yellow card) 90'	Report	Larsen 50'; De la Torre (yellow card) 65'	Stadium: San Mamés; Attendance: 40,759; Referee: Mario Melero López

25 May 2023 36	Osasuna	2–0	Athletic Bilbao	Pamplona
19:30 CEST (UTC+2)	Torró (yellow card) 31', (goal) 77'; Budimir 50', (yellow card) 66'; Ibáñez (yellow card) 84'	Report	De Marcos (yellow card) 15'; Berenguer (yellow card) 74'; Vivian (yellow card) 76'	Stadium: El Sadar; Attendance: 19,830; Referee: Alejandro Muñiz Ruiz

28 May 2023 37	Athletic Bilbao	0–1	Elche	Bilbao
19:00 CEST (UTC+2)	Vivian (yellow card) 17'	Report	Clerc (yellow card) 60'; Boyé 90+2'	Stadium: San Mamés; Attendance: 37,807; Referee: Valentín Pizarro Gómez

4 June 2023 38	Real Madrid	1–1	Athletic Bilbao	Madrid
18:30 CEST (UTC+2)	Ceballos (yellow card) 55'; Benzema 72' (pen.); Carvajal (yellow card) 85'	Report	Vesga (penalty missed) 10'; Sancet 49', (yellow card) 57'; Berchiche (yellow card) 71'	Stadium: Santiago Bernabéu; Attendance: 60,781; Referee: Isidro Díaz de Mera Escuderos

=== Copa del Rey ===
13 November 2022 First round	Alzira	0–2	Athletic Bilbao	Alzira
21:00 CET (UTC+1)	López (yellow card) 88'	Report	Berenguer 16'; N. Williams 42'; Lekue (yellow card) 74'	Stadium: Luis Suñer Picó; Referee: Guillermo Cuadra Fernández

20 December 2022 Second round	Sestao River	0–1	Athletic Bilbao	Sestao
21:00 CET (UTC+1)	Huete (yellow card) 31'; Uriarte (yellow card) 64'; Urzelai (yellow card) 90+1'	Report	R. García 32'	Stadium: Las Llanas; Attendance: 5,000; Referee: Javier Iglesias Villanueva

5 January 2023 Round of 32	Eldense	1–6	Athletic Bilbao	Elda
21:00 CET	Pajarero (yellow card) 40'; Carnicer (yellow card) 52'; Soberón 67'	Report	N. Williams 35'; Berenguer 41', 65'; Zarraga 59'; Correia 74' (o.g.); Muniain 90'	Stadium: Nuevo Pepico Amat; Attendance: 5,700; Referee: Javier Alberola Rojas

18 January 2023 Round of 16	Athletic Bilbao	1–0	Espanyol	Bilbao
20:00 CET (UTC+1)	De Marcos 27'; Yeray (yellow card) 45'	Report	Puado (yellow card) 36'; Sánchez (yellow card) 44'; S. Gómez (yellow card) 45+3'; Vinícius (yellow card) 90+3'	Stadium: San Mamés; Attendance: 37,564; Referee: Juan Luis Pulido Santana

26 January 2023 Quarter-finals	Valencia	1–3	Athletic Bilbao	Valencia
20:00 CET (UTC+1)	Diakhaby (yellow card) 28'; De Marcos 43' (o.g.); Musah (yellow card) 45+2'; Cömert (yellow card) 74'; Moriba (yellow card) 90+7'	Report	Vivian (yellow card) 32'; Muniain 35'; N. Williams 45'; Vesga 74' (pen.); Agirrezabala (yellow card) 78'; Sancet (yellow card) 88'	Stadium: Mestalla; Attendance: 45,040; Referee: Carlos del Cerro Grande

1 March 2023 Semi-finals; First leg	Osasuna	1–0	Athletic Bilbao	Pamplona
21:00 CET (UTC+1)	Ezzalzouli 47'; Budimir (yellow card) 52'; Gómez (yellow card) 54'; Brašanac (yellow card) 90+1'	Report	Berenguer (yellow card) 40'; Vesga (yellow card) 43'; Martínez (yellow card) 64'	Stadium: El Sadar; Attendance: 23,026; Referee: Jesús Gil Manzano

4 April 2023 Semi-finals; Second leg	Athletic Bilbao	1–1 (a.e.t.) (1–2 agg.)	Osasuna	Bilbao
21:00 CEST (UTC+2)	Vesga (yellow card) 21'; I. Williams 33'; Sancet (yellow card) 94'	Report	Torró (yellow card) 43'; Barja (yellow card) 75'; Ibáñez 116'	Stadium: San Mamés; Attendance: 51,544; Referee: Carlos del Cerro Grande

== Statistics ==
=== Appearances and goals ===
No.	Pos	Nat	Player	Total		La Liga		Copa del Rey	
No.	Pos	Nat	Player	Apps	Goals	Apps	Goals	Apps	Goals
Goalkeepers
1	GK	(Spain) ESP	Unai Simón	31	0	31	0	0	0
13	GK	(Spain) ESP	Julen Agirrezabala	15	0	7+1	0	7	0
35	GK	(Spain) ESP	Ander Iru	0	0	0	0	0	0
Defenders
3	DF	(Spain) ESP	Daniel Vivian	36	1	26+3	1	6+1	0
4	DF	(Spain) ESP	Iñigo Martínez	18	1	15	1	3	0
5	DF	(Spain) ESP	Yeray Álvarez	33	1	27+1	1	5	0
15	DF	(Spain) ESP	Iñigo Lekue	23	0	14+6	0	1+2	0
17	DF	(Spain) ESP	Yuri Berchiche	36	1	27+2	1	7	0
18	DF	(Spain) ESP	Óscar de Marcos	43	2	32+5	1	6	1
21	DF	(Spain) ESP	Ander Capa	7	0	1+6	0	0	0
24	DF	(Spain) ESP	Mikel Balenziaga	4	0	1+2	0	0+1	0
31	DF	(Spain) ESP	Aitor Paredes	17	0	9+7	0	0+1	0
Midfielders
6	MF	(Spain) ESP	Mikel Vesga	43	4	28+8	3	7	1
8	MF	(Spain) ESP	Oihan Sancet	41	10	32+4	10	4+1	0
14	MF	(Spain) ESP	Dani García	29	0	18+7	0	1+3	0
16	MF	(Spain) ESP	Unai Vencedor	11	0	0+10	0	0+1	0
19	MF	(Spain) ESP	Oier Zarraga	30	1	6+20	0	3+1	1
23	MF	(Spain) ESP	Ander Herrera	11	0	4+4	0	2+1	0
Forwards
2	FW	(Spain) ESP	Jon Morcillo	10	0	0+10	0	0	0
7	FW	(Spain) ESP	Álex Berenguer	43	7	26+11	4	5+1	3
9	FW	(Ghana) GHA	Iñaki Williams	42	11	34+2	10	3+3	1
10	FW	(Spain) ESP	Iker Muniain	36	2	19+11	0	4+2	2
11	FW	(Spain) ESP	Nico Williams	41	9	32+4	6	1+4	3
12	FW	(Spain) ESP	Gorka Guruzeta	37	6	17+13	6	3+4	0
22	FW	(Spain) ESP	Raúl García	42	3	6+29	2	3+4	1
28	FW	(Spain) ESP	Luis Bilbao	0	0	0	0	0	0
29	FW	(Spain) ESP	Adu Ares	9	0	0+8	0	0+1	0
Players who have made an appearance this season but have left the club
20	FW	(Spain) ESP	Asier Villalibre	8	0	1+4	0	1+2	0
