= 2023–24 Athletic Bilbao season =

Athletic Bilbao
2023–24 season
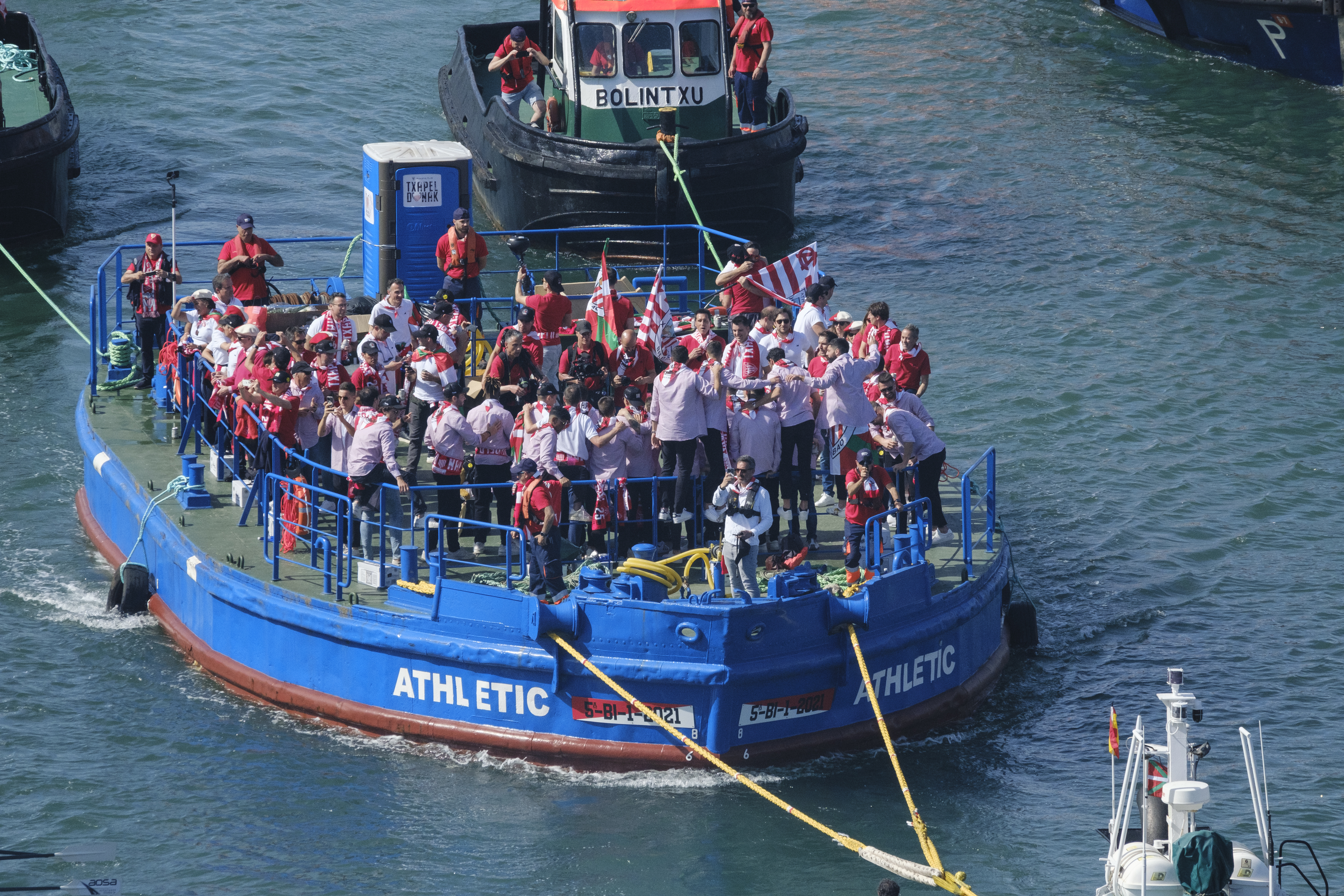
- The Athletic squad during their victory parade on the gabarra in the Nervión after winning the 2023–24 Copa del Rey
- President: Jon Uriarte
- Head coach: Ernesto Valverde
- Stadium: San Mamés
- La Liga: 5th
- Copa del Rey: Winners
- Top goalscorer: League: Gorka Guruzeta (14); All: Gorka Guruzeta (16)
- Average home league attendance: 46,112
Home colours	Away colours	Third colours

The 2023–24 season was Athletic Bilbao's 126th season in existence and 93rd consecutive season in La Liga. They also competed in the Copa del Rey, winning the latter title for the first time since 1984.

== Players ==
=== First-team squad ===
As of 1 September 2023

Note: Flags indicate national team as defined under FIFA eligibility rules; some limited exceptions apply. Players may hold more than one non-FIFA nationality.

No.	Pos.	Nation	Player
1	GK	ESP	Unai Simón
3	DF	ESP	Dani Vivian
4	DF	ESP	Aitor Paredes
5	DF	ESP	Yeray Álvarez
6	MF	ESP	Mikel Vesga
7	FW	ESP	Álex Berenguer
8	MF	ESP	Oihan Sancet
9	FW	GHA	Iñaki Williams (5th captain)
10	FW	ESP	Iker Muniain (captain)
11	FW	ESP	Nico Williams
12	FW	ESP	Gorka Guruzeta
13	GK	ESP	Julen Agirrezabala
14	MF	ESP	Dani García

No.	Pos.	Nation	Player
15	DF	ESP	Iñigo Lekue (4th captain)
16	MF	ESP	Iñigo Ruiz de Galarreta
17	DF	ESP	Yuri Berchiche
18	DF	ESP	Óscar de Marcos (vice-captain)
19	DF	ESP	Imanol
20	FW	ESP	Asier Villalibre
21	MF	ESP	Ander Herrera
22	FW	ESP	Raúl García (3rd captain)
23	FW	ESP	Adu Ares
24	MF	ESP	Beñat Prados
27	DF	ESP	Unai Egiluz
30	MF	ESP	Unai Gómez
31	MF	ESP	Mikel Jauregizar

== Transfers ==
=== In ===
Pos.	Player	Transferred from	Fee	Date	Source
MF	(Spain) Iñigo Ruiz de Galarreta	(Spain) Mallorca	Free	1 July 2023	
MF	(Spain) Nico Serrano	(Netherlands) PEC Zwolle	Loan return	11 January 2024	
DF	(Senegal) Adama Boiro	(Spain) Osasuna	€2million	25 January 2024	

=== Out ===
Pos.	Player	Transferred to	Fee	Date	Source
MF	(Spain) Oier Zarraga	(Italy) Udinese	Free	1 July 2023	
DF	(Spain) Iñigo Martínez	End of contract		1 July 2023	
MF	(Spain) Nico Serrano	(Netherlands) PEC Zwolle	Loan	10 August 2023	
MF	(Spain) Nico Serrano	(Spain) Racing Ferrol	Loan	12 January 2024	

=== New contracts ===
Position	Player	Until	Ref.
MF	(Spain) Oihan Sancet	June 2032	
DF	(Spain) Iñigo Lekue	June 2025	
DF	(Spain) Óscar de Marcos	June 2024	
MF	(Spain) Raúl García	June 2024	
MF	(Spain) Nico Serrano	June 2026	
MF	(Spain) Nico Williams	June 2027	

== Pre-season and friendlies ==
Win Draw Loss Fixtures

16 July 2023 Trofeo Árbol de Gernika; Second leg	Guadalajara	2–0 (2–2 agg.) (4–2 p)	Athletic Bilbao	Zapopan, Mexico
12:00 CDT (UTC−5)	Pérez 16'; Padilla 72', (yellow card) 90'	Report	Herrera (yellow card) 22'; Prados (yellow card) 34'; Berenguer (red card) 90'	Stadium: Estadio Akron; Referee: Maximiliano Quintero Hernández (Mexico)
	Penalties
	Marín (penalty scored); Calderón (penalty scored); Sepúlveda (penalty scored); Brígido (penalty scored)		(penalty scored) Vesga; (penalty scored) Morcillo; (penalty missed) R. García; (penalty missed) Vencedor

19 July 2023 Copa Centenario	Necaxa	0–2	Athletic Bilbao	Aguascalientes, Mexico
22:00 CDT (UTC−5)	Montes (yellow card) 56'	Report	Martón 48', 74'; Nolaskoain (yellow card) 55' (yellow-red card) 81'	Stadium: Estadio Victoria; Referee: Diego Montaño Robles (Mexico)

27 July 2023 Friendly	Racing Santander	0–0	Athletic Bilbao	Sarón
19:00 CEST (UTC+2)		Report		Stadium: Estadio Fernando Astobiza; Referee: Manuel Pozueta Rodríguez

1 August 2023 Friendly	Celtic	3–2	Athletic Bilbao	Glasgow, Scotland
19:30 BST (UTC+1)	Hatate 37'; Bernabei 66'; Turnbull 70'	Report	Gómez 2'; Muniain 38'	Stadium: Celtic Park; Referee: Willie Collum (Scotland)
Note: James Forrest testimonial

3 August 2023 Friendly	Athletic Bilbao	1–1	Eibar	Sestao
19:30 CEST (UTC+2)	Martón 20'; Herrera (yellow card) 55'	Report	Soriano 35'; Matheus (yellow card) 58'; Rober (yellow card) 73'	Stadium: Campo Municipal de Las Llanas; Referee: Pablo González Fuertes

6 August 2023 Friendly	Manchester United	1–1	Athletic Bilbao	Dublin, Republic of Ireland
16:00 BST (UTC+1)	Evans (yellow card) 84'; Pellistri 90+3'	Report	N. Williams 29'; Ruiz de Galarreta (yellow card) 39'; Lekue (yellow card) 63'; Paredes (red card) 66'; Vivian (yellow card) 83'; Imanol (yellow card) 84'	Stadium: Aviva Stadium; Attendance: 50,238; Referee: Neil Doyle (Republic of Ireland)

== Competitions ==
=== Overall record ===
Competition	First match	Last match	Starting round	Final position	Record							
Competition	First match	Last match	Starting round	Final position	Pld	W	D	L	GF	GA	GD	Win %
La Liga	12 August 2023	25 May 2024	Matchday 1	5th	38	19	11	8	61	37	+24	50.00
Copa del Rey	1 November 2023	6 April 2024	First round	Winners	8	7	1	0	19	4	+15	87.50
Total					46	26	12	8	80	41	+39	56.52

Source: Soccerway

=== La Liga ===
==== League table ====
Pos	Team	Pld	W	D	L	GF	GA	GD	Pts	Qualification or relegation
3	Girona	38	25	6	7	85	46	+39	81	Qualification for the Champions League league phase
4	Atlético Madrid	38	24	4	10	70	43	+27	76	Qualification for the Champions League league phase
5	Athletic Bilbao	38	19	11	8	61	37	+24	68	Qualification for the Europa League league phase (Note: Since the winners of the 2023–24 Copa del Rey, Athletic Bilbao, qualified for European competition based on league position, the Europa League berth awarded to the Copa del Rey winners was passed to the sixth-placed team, and the Conference League berth awarded to the sixth-placed team was passed to the seventh-placed team.)
6	Real Sociedad	38	16	12	10	51	39	+12	60	Qualification for the Europa League league phase
7	Real Betis	38	14	15	9	48	45	+3	57	Qualification for the Conference League play-off round

Source: LaLiga EA Sports
Rules for classification: 1) Points; 2) Head-to-head points; 3) Head-to-head goal difference; 4) Goal difference; 5) Goals scored; 6) Fair-play points
(Note: Head-to-head record is used only after all the matches between the teams in question have been played)

==== Results summary ====
Overall								Home						Away					
Pld	W	D	L	GF	GA	GD	Pts	W	D	L	GF	GA	GD	W	D	L	GF	GA	GD
38	19	11	8	61	37	+24	68	12	6	1	42	18	+24	7	5	7	19	19	0

Source: La Liga

==== Results by round ====
Round	1	2	3	4	5	6	7	8	9	10	11	12	13	14	15	16	17	18	19	20	21	22	23	24	25	26	27	28	29	30	31	32	33	34	35	36	37	38
Ground	H	A	H	A	H	A	H	A	H	A	H	A	H	A	H	A	H	H	A	H	A	A	H	A	H	A	H	A	H	A	H	H	A	A	H	A	H	A
Result	L	W	W	D	W	W	D	L	W	L	D	W	W	D	W	D	W	W	W	W	L	D	W	D	W	L	D	W	W	L	D	D	L	W	D	L	W	W
Position	20	11	5	5	4	4	4	6	5	6	6	5	5	5	5	5	5	5	4	3	5	5	5	5	5	5	5	5	4	5	5	5	5	5	5	5	5	5

Source: La Liga
A = Away; H = Home; W = Win; D = Draw; L = Loss

==== Matches ====
The league fixtures were unveiled on 22 June 2023.

12 August 2023 1	Athletic Bilbao	0–2	Real Madrid	Bilbao
21:30 CEST (UTC+2)	Muniain (yellow card) 4'; Vivian (yellow card) 67'; I. Williams (yellow card) 87'	Report	Rodrygo 28'; Bellingham 36'; Alaba (yellow card) 76'	Stadium: San Mamés; Attendance: 48,927; Referee: Jesús Gil Manzano

19 August 2023 2	Osasuna	0–2	Athletic Bilbao	Pamplona
21:30 CEST (UTC+2)	D. García (yellow card) 59'; Ávila (red card) 90+4'	Report	I. Williams 11'; Guruzeta 20'; Lekue (yellow card) 38'; Sancet (red card) 47'; Ruiz de Galarreta (yellow card) 71'; Simón (yellow card) 90+4'	Stadium: El Sadar; Attendance: 20,704; Referee: José Luis Munuera Montero

27 August 2023 3	Athletic Bilbao	4–2	Real Betis	Bilbao
21:30 CEST (UTC+2)	Vesga 30' (pen.), 45' (pen.), (yellow card) 79'; Guruzeta 45+7'; Paredes (yellow card) 59'; Ruiz de Galarreta (yellow card) 61'; Gómez 84'; Berenguer (yellow card) 90+1'	Report	Willian José 2'; Isco 10'; Rodríguez (yellow card) 44'; Abner (yellow card) 48'	Stadium: San Mamés; Attendance: 44,340; Referee: César Soto Grado

3 September 2023 4	Mallorca	0–0	Athletic Bilbao	Palma de Mallorca
16:15 CEST (UTC+2)		Report	Lekue (yellow card) 44'	Stadium: Estadi Mallorca Son Moix; Attendance: 17,043; Referee: Jorge Figueroa Vázquez

16 September 2023 5	Athletic Bilbao	3–0	Cádiz	Bilbao
14:00 CEST (UTC+2)	Paredes (yellow card) 45+2'; Guruzeta 66'; Villalibre 68'; I. Williams 90'	Report	Fali (yellow card) 46'; Alcaraz (yellow card) 50'; Gómez (yellow card) 87'; J. Hernández (yellow card) 90+3'	Stadium: San Mamés; Attendance: 42,881; Referee: Guillermo Cuadra Fernández

22 September 2023 6	Alavés	0–2	Athletic Bilbao	Vitoria-Gasteiz
21:00 CEST (UTC+2)	Kike (yellow card) 45+1'; Abqar (yellow card) 78'	Report	I. Williams 18'; Berenguer (yellow card) 29'; Berchiche (yellow card) 31'; Sancet 76'	Stadium: Mendizorrotza; Attendance: 19,421; Referee: Alejandro Muñiz Ruiz

27 September 2023 7	Athletic Bilbao	2–2	Getafe	Bilbao
19:00 CEST (UTC+2)	Paredes (yellow card) 2'; Berchiche 6'; Sancet (red card) 45+1'; Guruzeta (yellow card) 58'; I. Williams 62', (yellow card) 90+6'; Yeray (yellow card) 90+2'; R. García (yellow card) 90+6'	Report	Suárez (yellow card) 6'; Álvarez 51'; Latasa 83'; Angileri (yellow card) 83'; Óscar (yellow card) 90+2'; Djené (yellow card) 90+4'; Mata (yellow card) 90+10'	Stadium: San Mamés; Attendance: 43,091; Referee: Isidro Díaz de Mera Escuderos

30 September 2023 8	Real Sociedad	3–0	Athletic Bilbao	San Sebastián
21:00 CEST (UTC+2)	Le Normand 30'; Merino (yellow card) 44'; Kubo 48'; Oyarzabal 66'; Zubeldia (yellow card) 77'	Report	Herrera (yellow card) 29'; Vivian (yellow card) 44'	Stadium: Reale Arena; Attendance: 38,229; Referee: Jesús Gil Manzano

6 October 2023 9	Athletic Bilbao	3–0	Almería	Bilbao
21:00 CEST (UTC+2)	Guruzeta 10'; Herrera (yellow card) 52'; D. García 63'; Sancet 81'; De Marcos (yellow card) 84'	Report		Stadium: San Mamés; Attendance: 43,677; Referee: Víctor García Verdura

21 October 2023 10	Barcelona	1–0	Athletic Bilbao	Barcelona
21:00 CEST (UTC+2)	Gavi (yellow card) 16'; Romeu (yellow card) 41'; Guiu 80', (yellow card) 83'	Report	D. García (yellow card) 37'; Ares (yellow card) 73'; De Marcos (yellow card) 89'	Stadium: Estadi Olímpic Lluís Companys; Attendance: 38,194; Referee: Juan Martínez Munuera

29 October 2023 11	Athletic Bilbao	2–2	Valencia	Bilbao
18:30 CET (UTC+1)	Paredes (yellow card) 12'; De Marcos 32'; D. García (yellow card) 55'; Ruiz de Galarreta (yellow card) 87'; Berenguer 90+7'	Report	Amallah (yellow card) 57'; Pérez 62'; Duro 68'	Stadium: San Mamés; Attendance: 46,563; Referee: Jorge Figueroa Vázquez

5 November 2023 12	Villarreal	2–3	Athletic Bilbao	Villarreal
18:30 CET (UTC+1)	Gabbia (yellow card) 19'; Albiol (yellow card) 72'; Mandi (yellow card) 74'; Femenía (yellow card) 76'; Gerard 86'; Sørloth 87'	Report	Ruiz de Galarreta 2', (yellow card) 90+5'; N. Williams 22', (yellow card) 41'; I. Williams 32'; De Marcos (yellow card) 44'; D. García (yellow card) 89'	Stadium: Estadio de la Cerámica; Attendance: 18,709; Referee: Guillermo Cuadra Fernández

10 November 2023 13	Athletic Bilbao	4–3	Celta Vigo	Bilbao
21:00 CET (UTC+1)	Sancet 37'; Guruzeta 45+5', 52'; Simón (yellow card) 56'; R. García (yellow card) 90+2'; Berenguer 90+8' (pen.)	Report	Aspas 25', (yellow card) 39', (penalty missed) 72'; Bamba 41'; Larsen 66'; Guaita (yellow card) 90+5'	Stadium: San Mamés; Attendance: 44,435; Referee: Juan Luis Pulido Santana

27 November 2023 14	Girona	1–1	Athletic Bilbao	Girona
21:00 CET (UTC+1)	Tsyhankov 55'; Blind (yellow card) 59'	Report	Guruzeta (yellow card) 51'; I. Williams 67'	Stadium: Montilivi; Attendance: 13,123; Referee: Mario Melero López

2 December 2023 15	Athletic Bilbao	4–0	Rayo Vallecano	Bilbao
16:15 CET (UTC+1)	Vivian (yellow card) 6'; Guruzeta 23'; Espino 47' (o.g.); I. Williams 64'; N. Williams 68'	Report	Espino (yellow card) 32'; Falcao (yellow card) 87'	Stadium: San Mamés; Attendance: 44,689; Referee: Francisco José Hernández Maeso

10 December 2023 16	Granada	1–1	Athletic Bilbao	Granada
16:15 CET (UTC+1)	Ruiz de Galarreta 55' (o.g.)	Report	I. Williams 6'; N. Williams (yellow card) 78'; Berchiche (yellow card) 90'	Stadium: Nuevo Los Cármenes; Attendance: 12,849; Referee: Miguel Ángel Ortiz Arias
Note: The match was abandoned after 18 minutes due to the death of a spectator in the stadium, and resumed the following day.

16 December 2023 17	Athletic Bilbao	2–0	Atlético Madrid	Bilbao
16:15 CET (UTC+1)	Sancet (penalty missed) 36'; Guruzeta 51'; N. Williams 64'	Report	De Paul (yellow card) 49'	Stadium: San Mamés; Attendance: 48,781; Referee: Jesús Gil Manzano

20 December 2023 18	Athletic Bilbao	1–0	Las Palmas	Bilbao
21:30 CET (UTC+1)	Guruzeta (penalty missed) 40'; Gómez 90+4'; I. Williams (yellow card) 90+7'	Report	Araujo (yellow card) 39'; Perrone (yellow card) 68'; Loiodice (yellow card) 90+7'	Stadium: San Mamés; Attendance: 39,471; Referee: Juan Martínez Munuera

4 January 2024 19	Sevilla	0–2	Athletic Bilbao	Seville
19:15 CET (UTC+1)	Sow (yellow card) 36'; Rakitić (yellow card) 75'; Marcão (yellow card) 86'	Report	Vesga 30'; Paredes 76'; R. García (yellow card) 90+2'	Stadium: Ramón Sánchez Pizjuán; Attendance: 28,366; Referee: José María Sánchez Martínez

13 January 2024 20	Athletic Bilbao	2–1	Real Sociedad	Bilbao
18:30 CET (UTC+1)	Berenguer 30', 42'; Gómez (yellow card) 90+3'	Report	Barrenetxea (yellow card) 61'; Oyarzabal 88'; Merino (yellow card) 90'; Le Normand (yellow card) 90+2'; Elustondo (yellow card) 90+3'	Stadium: San Mamés; Attendance: 51,475; Referee: José Luis Munuera Montero

20 January 2024 21	Valencia	1–0	Athletic Bilbao	Valencia
18:30 CET (UTC+1)	Duro 61'	Report	N. Williams (yellow card) 56'; Vivian (yellow card) 89'; Ares (yellow card) 90+2'	Stadium: Mestalla; Attendance: 45,344; Referee: Juan Luis Pulido Santana

28 January 2024 22	Cádiz	0–0	Athletic Bilbao	Cádiz
16:15 CET (UTC+1)	Alcaraz (yellow card) 47'; Fali (yellow card) 73'; Alejo (yellow card) 78'; Escalante (yellow card) 89'	Report	Vesga (yellow card) 22'; Lekue (yellow card) 45'	Stadium: Nuevo Mirandilla; Attendance: 18,839; Referee: Mateo Busquets Ferrer

2 February 2024 23	Athletic Bilbao	4–0	Mallorca	Bilbao
21:00 CET (UTC+1)	Berchiche 3', 16'; Guruzeta 62'; Muniain 89'	Report	Larin (yellow card) 75'	Stadium: San Mamés; Attendance: 47,061; Referee: Jorge Figueroa Vázquez

12 February 2024 24	Almería	0–0	Athletic Bilbao	Almería
21:00 CET (UTC+1)	Ramazani (yellow card) 27' (yellow-red card) 53'; Pubill (yellow card) 34'; Melero (yellow card) 89'	Report	Sancet (yellow card) 84'	Stadium: Power Horse Stadium; Attendance: 12,863; Referee: Víctor García Verdura

19 February 2024 25	Athletic Bilbao	3–2	Girona	Bilbao
21:00 CET (UTC+1)	Berengeur 2', 56'; Lekue (yellow card) 25'; I. Williams 60'	Report	Juan Carlos (yellow card) 20'; Tsyhankov 49'; E. García 75'	Stadium: San Mamés; Attendance: 46,220; Referee: José María Sánchez Martínez

25 February 2024 26	Real Betis	3–1	Athletic Bilbao	Seville
16:15 CET (UTC+1)	Ávila 13', (yellow card) 30'; Berchiche 38' (o.g.); Cardoso 67'	Report	Berchiche (yellow card) 32'; N. Williams (yellow card) 40' (yellow-red card) 40'; Berenguer (yellow card) 41'; Vivian (yellow card) 47'; Guruzeta 45+7'; Imanol (yellow card) 59'	Stadium: Benito Villamarín; Attendance: 53,537; Referee: Guillermo Cuadra Fernández

3 March 2024 27	Athletic Bilbao	0–0	Barcelona	Bilbao
21:00 CET (UTC+1)	D. García (yellow card) 52'; Imanol (yellow card) 65'; Berenguer (yellow card) 86'	Report	Araújo (yellow card) 32'; Christensen (yellow card) 62'; Koundé (yellow card) 88'	Stadium: San Mamés; Attendance: 50,295; Referee: Alejandro José Hernández Hernández

10 March 2024 28	Las Palmas	0–2	Athletic Bilbao	Las Palmas
15:15 WET (UTC±0)	Coco (yellow card) 64'; M. Cardona (yellow card) 81'; Valles (yellow card) 82'	Report	Guruzeta 31'; Vivian (yellow card) 48'; Coco 65' (o.g.); De Marcos (yellow card) 67'; Paredes (yellow card) 90+1'	Stadium: Estadio Gran Canaria; Attendance: 27,316; Referee: Miguel Ángel Ortiz Arias

16 March 2024 29	Athletic Bilbao	2–0	Alavés	Bilbao
21:00 CET (UTC+1)	Guruzeta 32', 37'; N. Williams (yellow card) 54'	Report	Rioja (penalty missed) 31'; Benavídez (yellow card) 80'; Abqar (yellow card) 86'; Blanco (yellow card) 90+2'	Stadium: San Mamés; Attendance: 48,257; Referee: Alejandro Muñiz Ruiz

31 March 2024 30	Real Madrid	2–0	Athletic Bilbao	Madrid
21:00 CEST (UTC+2)	Rodrygo 8', 73'; Tchouaméni (yellow card) 57'; Nacho (yellow card) 71'	Report	Ruiz de Galaretta (yellow card) 87'	Stadium: Santiago Bernabéu; Attendance: 72,991; Referee: Javier Alberola Rojas

14 April 2024 31	Athletic Bilbao	1–1	Villarreal	Bilbao
18:30 CEST (UTC+2)	Prados (yellow card) 11'; I. Williams (yellow card) 31'; Sancet 66'; Berchiche (yellow card) 90+4'	Report	Gerard (penalty missed) 11'; Comesaña (yellow card) 35' (yellow-red card) 46'; Albiol (yellow card) 35'; Parejo 90+5'	Stadium: San Mamés; Attendance: 50,061; Referee: Guillermo Cuadra Fernández

19 April 2024 32	Athletic Bilbao	1–1	Granada	Bilbao
21:00 CEST (UTC+2)	Paredes (yellow card) 4'; Guruzeta 25'; De Marcos (yellow card) 27'; Sancet (yellow card) 38'; Herrera (yellow card) 90+5'	Report	I. Williams 6' (o.g.); Puertas (yellow card) 47'; Méndez (yellow card) 66'	Stadium: San Mamés; Attendance: 45,917; Referee: Javier Iglesias Villanueva

27 April 2024 33	Atlético Madrid	3–1	Athletic Bilbao	Madrid
21:00 CEST (UTC+2)	De Paul (yellow card) 5', (goal) 15'; Correa 52'; Simón 80' (o.g.); Hermoso (yellow card) 90+3'; Griezmann (yellow card) 90+4'	Report	N. Williams 45'; Sancet (yellow card) 59'; Paredes (yellow card) 71'	Stadium: Cívitas Metropolitano; Attendance: 64,612; Referee: Juan Martínez Munuera

3 May 2024 34	Getafe	0–2	Athletic Bilbao	Getafe
21:00 CEST (UTC+2)	Greenwood (penalty missed) 88'	Report	I. Williams 27', 51'; Yeray (red card) 58'; Paredes (yellow card) 72' (yellow-red card) 79'	Stadium: Coliseum; Attendance: 12,149; Referee: Jesús Gil Manzano

11 May 2024 35	Athletic Bilbao	2–2	Osasuna	Bilbao
21:00 CEST (UTC+2)	Berchiche (yellow card) 22'; Herrera (yellow card) 45+2'; I. Williams 58'; Villalibre 90+6'	Report	Herrando (yellow card) 34'; Ra. García 40'; Ru. García 47', (yellow card) 90+2'; Ibáñez (yellow card) 55'; Catena (yellow card) 73'	Stadium: San Mamés; Attendance: 45,273; Referee: José María Sánchez Martínez

15 May 2024 36	Celta Vigo	2–1	Athletic Bilbao	Vigo
22:00 CEST (UTC+2)	Swedberg 68'; Álvarez 71'; Starfelt (yellow card) 80'; Cervi (yellow card) 90+5'	Report	Berenguer 23'	Stadium: Balaídos; Attendance: 21,301; Referee: Víctor García Verdura

19 May 2024 37	Athletic Bilbao	2–0	Sevilla	Bilbao
19:00 CEST (UTC+2)	R. García 17'; Munian 19'; Ruiz de Galarreta (yellow card) 37'	Report	Salas (yellow card) 45+2'	Stadium: San Mamés; Attendance: 44,717; Referee: Juan Luis Pulido Santana

25 May 2024 38	Rayo Vallecano	0–1	Athletic Bilbao	Madrid
18:30 CEST (UTC+2)	Crespo (yellow card) 84'	Report	Ruiz de Galarreta (yellow card) 44'; N. Williams 67'	Stadium: Campo de Fútbol de Vallecas; Attendance: 13,090; Referee: José Luis Munuera Montero

=== Copa del Rey ===
1 November 2023 First round	Rubí	1–2	Athletic Bilbao	Rubí
21:30 CET (UTC+1)	Picón (yellow card) 1'; Morell (yellow card) 31'; Mulero (yellow card) 84'; Rodríguez 86'; Monsó (yellow card) 90+3'	Report	Ares 50', 57'	Stadium: Can Rosés; Attendance: 4,000; Referee: César Soto Grado

7 December 2023 Second round	Cayón	0–3	Athletic Bilbao	Santander
21:00 CET (UTC+1)	Turrado (yellow card) 57'; Resines (yellow card) 78'	Report	Imanol (yellow card) 13'; Villalibre 22', 26' (pen.); N. Williams 85'	Stadium: Campos de Sport de El Sardinero; Attendance: 12,295; Referee: Jorge Bueno Mateo
Note: The match was played at the Campos de Sport de El Sardinero in Santander, instead of Cayón's regular stadium, the Fernando Astobiza in Cayón, which did not meet the broadcasting requirements.

7 January 2024 Round of 32	Eibar	0–3	Athletic Bilbao	Eibar
19:00 CET (UTC+1)	Berrocal (yellow card) 59'	Report	Vivian (yellow card) 4'; Villalibre 17', 40'; Muniain 33'; Sancet (yellow card) 59'	Stadium: Ipurua; Attendance: 7,499; Referee: Alejandro Hernández Hernández

16 January 2024 Round of 16	Athletic Bilbao	2–0	Alavés	Bilbao
21:00 CET (UTC+1)	Villalibre 28', 60'	Report	Benavídez (yellow card) 71'; Marín (yellow card) 90'	Stadium: San Mamés; Attendance: 45,233; Referee: César Soto Grado

24 January 2024 Quarter-finals	Athletic Bilbao	4–2 (a.e.t.)	Barcelona	Bilbao
21:30 CET (UTC+1)	Guruzeta 1'; Sancet (yellow card) 36', (goal) 49'; Prados (yellow card) 83'; I. Williams 105+2'; Herrera (yellow card) 109'; N. Williams 120+1', (yellow card) 120+1'	Report	Christensen (yellow card) 17'; Lewandowski 26'; Yamal 32', (yellow card) 95'; Torres (yellow card) 83'; Fort (yellow card) 84'; De Jong (yellow card) 115'; Roberto (yellow card) 117'	Stadium: San Mamés; Attendance: 50,403; Referee: José María Sánchez Martínez

7 February 2024 Semi-finals; First leg	Atlético Madrid	0–1	Athletic Bilbao	Madrid
21:30 CET (UTC+1)	Mandava (yellow card) 23'; De Paul (yellow card) 83'	Report	Berenguer 25' (pen.); Prados (yellow card) 37'; Vivian (yellow card) 45+2'; Gómez (yellow card) 71'; Ruiz de Galarreta (yellow card) 90+7'	Stadium: Cívitas Metropolitano; Attendance: 65,029; Referee: Alejandro Hernández Hernández

29 February 2024 Semi-finals; Second leg	Athletic Bilbao	3–0 (4–0 agg.)	Atlético Madrid	Bilbao
21:30 CET (UTC+1)	I. Williams 13'; Ruiz de Galarreta (yellow card) 40'; N. Williams 42'; Muniain (yellow card) 45+6'; Guruzeta 61'; Lekue (yellow card) 66'; De Marcos (yellow card) 74'	Report	Hermoso (yellow card) 28'	Stadium: San Mamés; Attendance: 52,061; Referee: Juan Martínez Munuera

6 April 2024 Final	Athletic Bilbao	1–1 (a.e.t.) (4–2 p)	Mallorca	Seville
22:00 CEST (UTC+2)	Paredes (yellow card) 27'; Sancet 50'	Report	Rodríguez 21'; Muriqi (yellow card) 90+1'; Radonjić (yellow card) 119'	Stadium: La Cartuja; Attendance: 57,619; Referee: José Luis Munuera Montero
	Penalties
	R. García (penalty scored); Muniain (penalty scored); Vesga (penalty scored); Berenguer (penalty scored)		(penalty scored) Muriqi; (penalty missed) Morlanes; (penalty missed) Radonjić; (penalty scored) Sánchez

== Statistics ==
=== Appearances and goals ===
No.	Pos	Nat	Player	Total		La Liga		Copa del Rey	
No.	Pos	Nat	Player	Apps	Goals	Apps	Goals	Apps	Goals
Goalkeepers
1	GK	(Spain) ESP	Unai Simón	36	0	36	0	0	0
13	GK	(Spain) ESP	Julen Agirrezabala	12	0	2+2	0	8	0
Defenders
3	DF	(Spain) ESP	Daniel Vivian	40	0	31+2	0	6+1	0
4	DF	(Spain) ESP	Aitor Paredes	40	1	31+3	1	6	0
5	DF	(Spain) ESP	Yeray Álvarez	21	0	14+5	0	0+2	0
15	DF	(Spain) ESP	Iñigo Lekue	33	0	22+5	0	5+1	0
17	DF	(Spain) ESP	Yuri Berchiche	33	3	22+5	3	5+1	0
18	DF	(Spain) ESP	Óscar de Marcos	33	1	26+2	1	4+1	0
19	DF	(Spain) ESP	Imanol	10	0	5+4	0	1	0
27	DF	(Spain) ESP	Unai Egiluz	1	0	0	0	1	0
Midfielders
6	MF	(Spain) ESP	Mikel Vesga	32	3	18+9	3	3+2	0
8	MF	(Spain) ESP	Oihan Sancet	38	6	25+5	4	6+2	2
14	MF	(Spain) ESP	Dani García	19	1	7+10	1	0+2	0
16	MF	(Spain) ESP	Iñigo Ruiz de Galarreta	35	1	25+4	1	3+3	0
21	MF	(Spain) ESP	Ander Herrera	27	0	10+13	0	2+2	0
24	MF	(Spain) ESP	Beñat Prados	33	0	16+10	0	7	0
30	MF	(Spain) ESP	Unai Gómez	33	2	9+16	2	2+6	0
31	MF	(Spain) ESP	Mikel Jauregizar	10	0	1+6	0	0+3	0
Forwards
7	FW	(Spain) ESP	Álex Berenguer	41	8	15+20	7	4+2	1
9	FW	(Ghana) GHA	Iñaki Williams	39	14	32+2	12	3+2	2
10	FW	(Spain) ESP	Iker Muniain	25	3	5+15	2	4+1	1
11	FW	(Spain) ESP	Nico Williams	37	8	29+2	5	4+2	3
12	FW	(Spain) ESP	Gorka Guruzeta	36	16	30+2	14	4	2
20	FW	(Spain) ESP	Asier Villalibre	24	8	4+14	2	3+3	6
22	FW	(Spain) ESP	Raúl García	25	1	1+19	1	2+3	0
23	FW	(Spain) ESP	Adu Ares	17	2	2+10	0	3+2	2
33	FW	(Spain) ESP	Aingeru Olabarrieta	1	0	0+1	0	0	0
Players who have made an appearance this season but have left the club
23	MF	(Spain) ESP	Peru Nolaskoain	5	0	0+2	0	2+1	0
