= Malcom Adu Ares =

Spanish footballer (born 2001)

Malcom Adu Ares (Note: He has been referred to as Adu Ares, Adu Malcom, Malcom Adu, Malcom Ares and Malcom Djalo.)
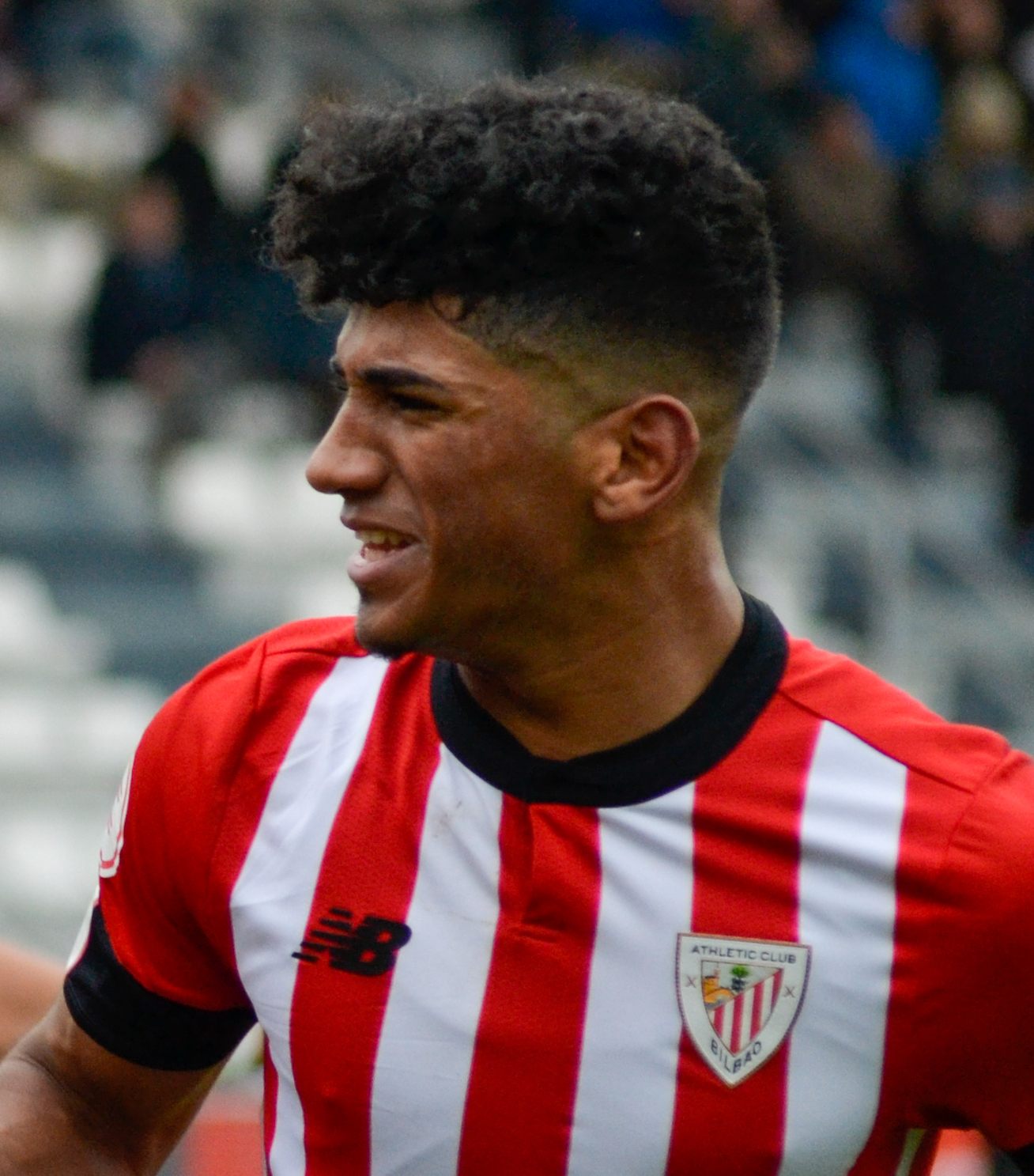
- Ares in 2023

Personal information
- Full name: Malcom Abdulai Ares Djaló
- Date of birth: 12 October 2001 (age 25)
- Place of birth: Bilbao, Spain
- Height: 1.83 m (6 ft 0 in)
- Position: Winger

Team information
- Current team: Eibar
- Number: 18

Youth career
- Danok Bat
- Indautxu
- Santutxu

Senior career*
Years	Team	Apps	(Gls)
2020–2021	Santutxu	24	(0)
2021–2022	Basconia	15	(2)
2021–2023	Bilbao Athletic	48	(10)
2022–2025	Athletic Bilbao	21	(0)
2024–2025	→ Zaragoza (loan)	30	(2)
2025–	Eibar	28	(2)

International career^{‡}
2024–	Basque Country	1	(0)
- * Club domestic league appearances and goals as of 6 June 2026 ‡ National team caps and goals as of 24 March 2024

Malcom Abdulai Ares Djaló (born 12 October 2001) is a Spanish professional footballer who plays as a winger for Eibar.

== Career ==
Born in Bilbao, Biscay to a Basque father and mother originally from Guinea-Bissau (Note: Stated as Guinea in some sources.) (his cousin Álvaro Djaló is also a footballer) Ares began his career locally with Deusto, Danok Bat, Indautxu and Santutxu, where his talent drew the attention of Athletic Bilbao. Having played one season at senior level with Santutxu he joined the Lions in the summer of 2021, aged 19, and was initially assigned to their farm team, Basconia of the Tercera División RFEF (fifth tier).

Ares's good form, as well as a need for reinforcements in the squad of the club's reserve team, Bilbao Athletic – struggling to survive in the 2021–22 Primera División RFEF – saw him promoted mid-season, and he continued to perform impressively at the higher (third) level while helping the team avoid relegation.

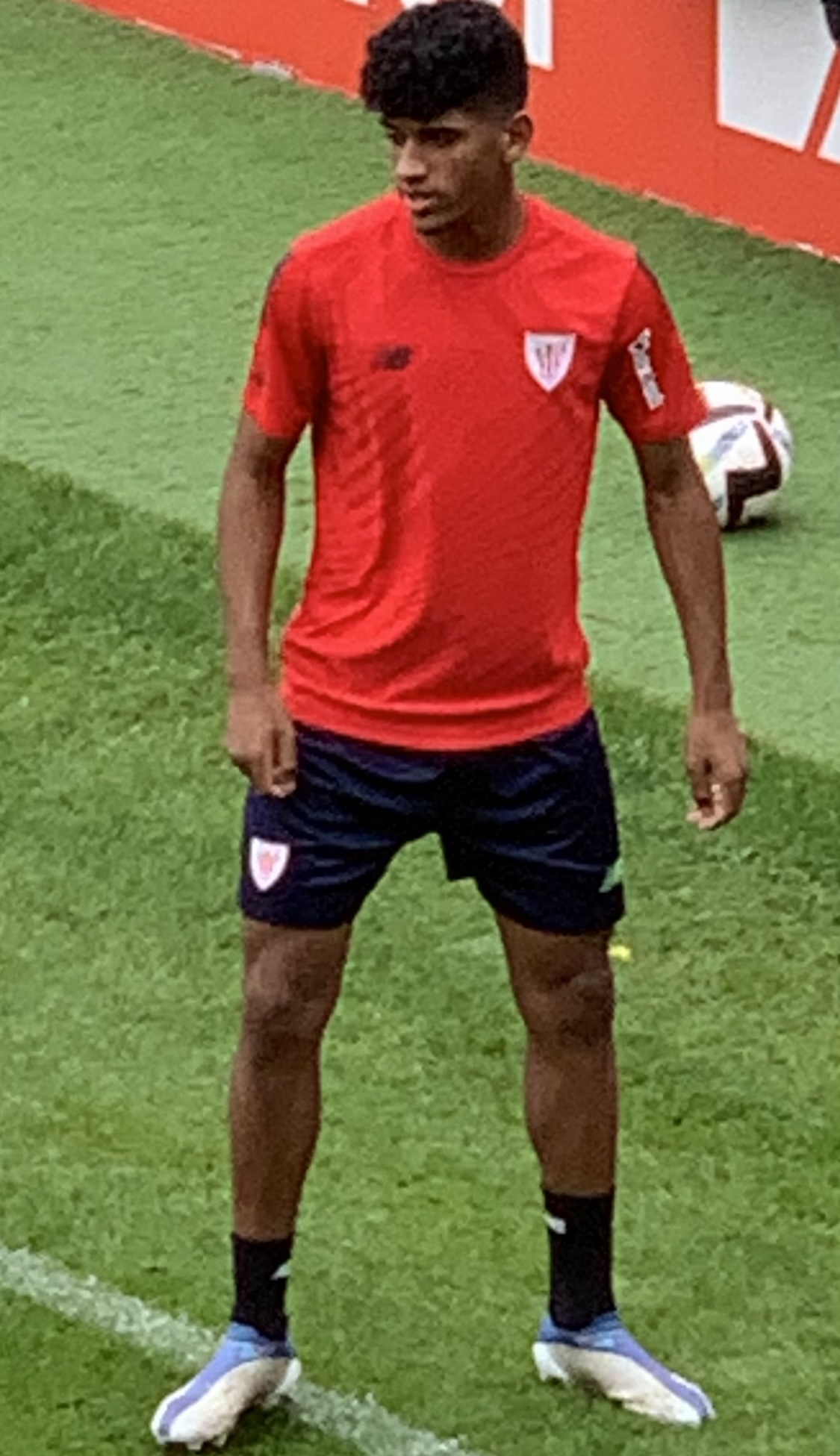
Ares training with Athletic Bilbao in the 2022 pre-season

In the summer 2022 pre-season, Ares was one of the youth players chosen for training and assessment as part of the Athletic senior squad (along with fellow forward Luis Bilbao and goalkeeper Álex Padilla). He was listed among the substitutes by coach Ernesto Valverde for the opening day of the 2022–23 La Liga campaign, and made his top division debut as a late replacement for Iñaki Williams in the closing minutes of the fixture against Mallorca at the San Mamés, which ended goalless. He was a regular with the reserves that season as they suffered relegation from the third tier, and made eight more appearances from the bench towards the end of the campaign for the first team – however, he was only on the winning side once as results eluded Athletic: they lost in the Copa del Rey semi-finals to rivals Osasuna and finished behind the same opposition in eighth position in La Liga, just out of the European places.

On 14 December 2023, Ares extended his contract with Athletic Bilbao until 30 June 2027. The following 30 August, he was loaned to Segunda División side Real Zaragoza for the season.

On 17 August 2025, Ares signed a five-year deal with Eibar also in the second division, with Athletic holding a buy-back option, a percentage of a future transfer and several other clauses.

== Career statistics ==
As of match played 24 August 2024

Appearances and goals by club, season and competition
Club	Season	League			Copa del Rey		Europe		Total	
Club	Season	Division	Apps	Goals	Apps	Goals	Apps	Goals	Apps	Goals
Santutxu	2020–21	Tercera División	24	0	—		—		24	0
Basconia	2021–22	Tercera RFEF	15	2	—		—		15	2
Bilbao Athletic	2021–22	Primera RFEF	19	6	—		—		19	6
Bilbao Athletic	2022–23	Primera Federación	28	4	—		—		28	4
Bilbao Athletic	2023–24	Segunda Federación	1	0	—		—		1	0
Bilbao Athletic	Total		48	10	—		—		48	10
Athletic Bilbao	2022–23	La Liga	8	0	1	0	—		9	0
Athletic Bilbao	2023–24	La Liga	12	0	5	2	—		17	2
Athletic Bilbao	2024–25	La Liga	1	0	0	0	—		1	0
Athletic Bilbao	Total		21	0	6	2	0	0	27	2
Career total			108	12	6	2	0	0	114	14

== Honours ==
- Copa del Rey: 2023–24
