= Julen Agirrezabala =

Spanish footballer

Personal information
- Full name: Julen Agirrezabala Astúlez
- Date of birth: 26 December 2000 (age 25)
- Place of birth: Errenteria, Spain
- Height: 1.87 m (6 ft 2 in)
- Position: Goalkeeper

Team information
- Current team: Racing Santander
- Number: 13

Youth career
- 2011–2014: Touring
- 2014–2018: Antiguoko
- 2018–2019: Athletic Bilbao

Senior career*
Years	Team	Apps	(Gls)
2019–2020	Basconia	19	(0)
2020–2022	Athletic Bilbao B	41	(0)
2021–2026	Athletic Bilbao	30	(0)
2025–2026	→ Valencia (loan)	18	(0)
2026–	Racing Santander	3	(0)

International career^{‡}
2021–2023	Spain U21	8	(0)
2024–	Basque Country	1	(0)
Medal record
Men's football
Representing Spain
UEFA European Under-21 Championship
Runner-up	2023 Georgia–Romania
- * Club domestic league appearances and goals as of 07:49, 2 September 2026 (UTC) ‡ National team caps and goals as of 1 April 2024

Julen Agirrezabala Astúlez (born 26 December 2000) is a Spanish professional footballer who plays as a goalkeeper for La Liga club Racing de Santander.

== Club career ==
=== Athletic Bilbao ===
Born in Errenteria, Gipuzkoa, Basque Country, Agirrezabala joined Athletic Bilbao's academy in 2018 after spells at CD Touring and Antiguoko. He made his senior debut with the farm team during the 2019–20 season, in the Tercera División.

On his first appearance for the reserves on 1 November 2020, Agirrezabala saved a penalty kick in a 3–2 Segunda División B away win against Club Portugalete. The following March, he renewed his contract until 2025.

Agirrezabala was called by manager Marcelino García Toral for the first team's pre-season in June 2021. He made his first-team – and La Liga – debut on 16 August, starting in a 0–0 draw at Elche CF. He spent most of that campaign with the B side, but was selected in the Copa del Rey in preference to Jokin Ezkieta (first-choice Unai Simón stepping aside) and took part in victories over FC Barcelona and Real Madrid before the run was ended at the semi-finals by Valencia CF; Ezkieta eventually left the San Mamés Stadium, and he became the main understudy to Simón in the league.

Agirrezabala was again used in the cup in 2022–23 as Athletic advanced to the last-four stage four once more, this time being eliminated by CA Osasuna. He then played every minute of their run in the following edition of the tournament, keeping four clean sheets including in both legs of the semi-finals against Atlético Madrid; in the final against RCD Mallorca, his solid performance was capped by saving Manu Morlanes's effort in the penalty shootout as the club claimed the trophy for the first time in 40 years.

On 11 July 2025, Agirrezabala joined Valencia on loan for the season, with a non-binding purchase option at the end of the move. During his tenure, he faced competition from Stole Dimitrievski until being sidelined with a knee injury in March 2026; the previous November, the Macedonian had voiced his displeasure over what he felt was preferential treatment of the Spaniard due to contractual reasons.

=== Racing Santander ===
On 10 August 2026, Agirrezabala signed a five-year contract with Racing de Santander, newly-promoted to the top tier.

== International career ==
In August 2021, Agirrezabala was called up to the Spain under-21 squad for two 2023 UEFA European Championship qualifying matches, making his debut on 8 October in a 3–2 defeat of Slovakia at La Cartuja. He was called up for the finals held in Georgia and Romania, backing up Arnau Tenas in the competition but taking the field in the third group-stage match against Ukraine; fellow goalkeeper Leo Román played the last 45 minutes of the 2–2 draw.

Agirrezabala also earned caps for the unofficial Basque Country side.

== Career statistics ==
As of match played 18 October 2026

Appearances and goals by club, season and competition
Club	Season	League			Copa del Rey		Europe		Other		Total	
Club	Season	Division	Apps	Goals	Apps	Goals	Apps	Goals	Apps	Goals	Apps	Goals
Basconia	2019–20	Tercera Federación	19	0	—		—		—		19	0
Athletic Bilbao B	2019–20	Segunda División B	0	0	—		—		—		0	0
Athletic Bilbao B	2020–21	Segunda División B	14	0	—		—		—		14	0
Athletic Bilbao B	2021–22	Primera Federación	27	0	—		—		—		27	0
Athletic Bilbao B	Total		41	0	—		—		—		41	0
Athletic Bilbao	2021–22	La Liga	4	0	5	0	—		0	0	9	0
Athletic Bilbao	2022–23	La Liga	8	0	7	0	—		—		15	0
Athletic Bilbao	2023–24	La Liga	4	0	8	0	—		—		12	0
Athletic Bilbao	2024–25	La Liga	14	0	2	0	13 (Note: Appearances in UEFA Europa League)	0	—		29	0
Athletic Bilbao	Total		30	0	22	0	13	0	—		65	0
Valencia (loan)	2025–26	La Liga	18	0	1	0	—		—		19	0
Racing de Santander	2026–27	La Liga	9	0	0	0	—		—		9	0
Career total			117	0	23	0	13	0	0	0	153	0

== Honours ==
Athletic Bilbao

- Copa del Rey: 2023–24

Spain U21

- UEFA European Under-21 Championship runner-up: 2023
