= Oihan Sancet =

Spanish footballer (born 2000)

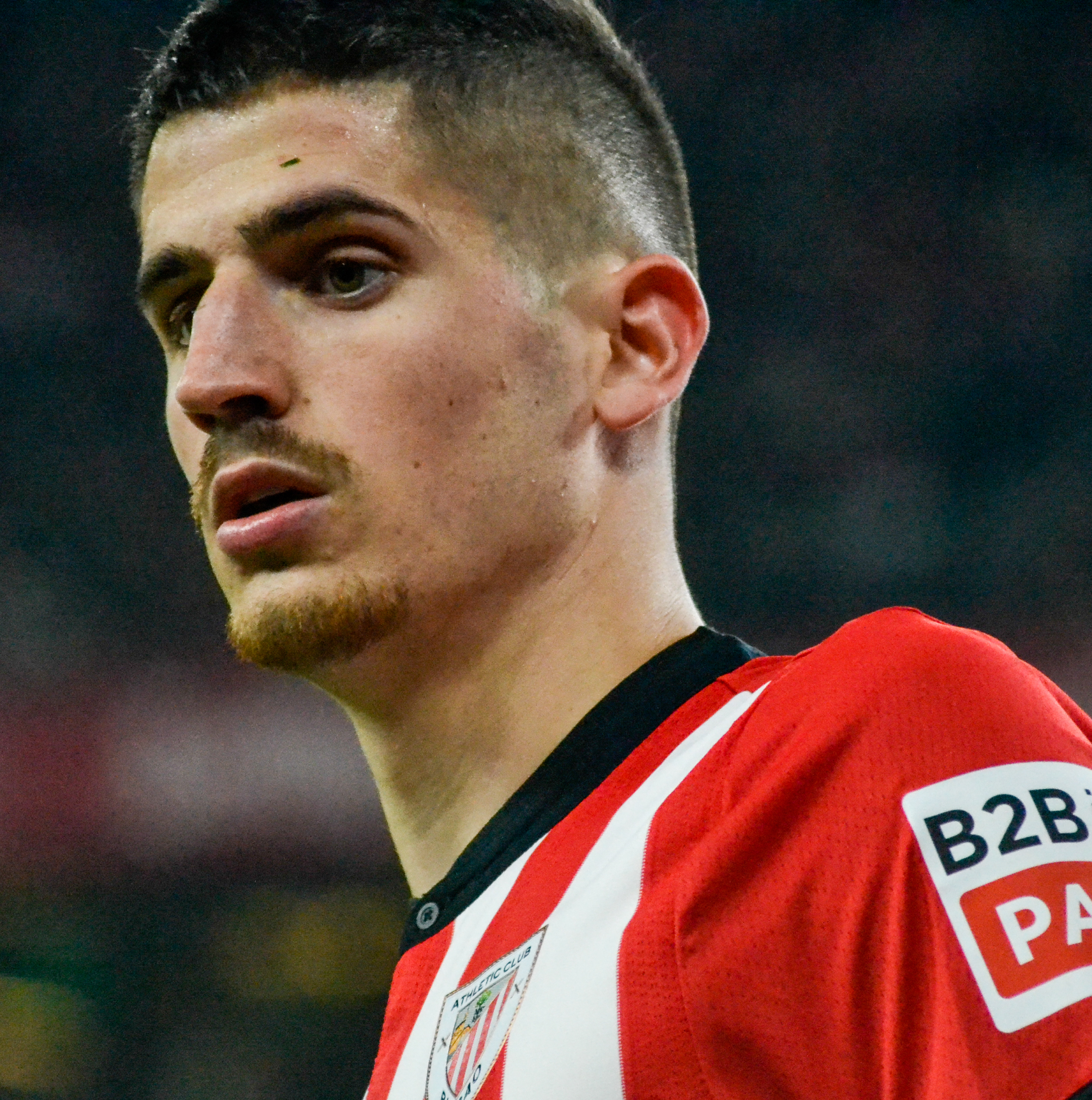
- Sancet with Athletic Bilbao in 2023

Personal information
- Full name: Oihan Sancet Tirapu
- Date of birth: 25 April 2000 (age 26)
- Place of birth: Pamplona, Spain
- Height: 1.88 m (6 ft 2 in)
- Position: Attacking midfielder

Team information
- Current team: Athletic Bilbao
- Number: 8

Youth career
- 2010–2015: Osasuna
- 2015–2018: Athletic Bilbao

Senior career*
Years	Team	Apps	(Gls)
2018–2020	Bilbao Athletic	24	(7)
2019–	Athletic Bilbao	200	(43)

International career^{‡}
2018	Spain U18	4	(1)
2019–2023	Spain U21	13	(1)
2023–	Spain	4	(1)
2026–	Basque Country	1	(0)
Medal record
Representing Spain
UEFA European Under-21 Championship
Runner-up	2023 Georgia–Romania	Team
- * Club domestic league appearances and goals as of 18:15, 20 November 2026 (UTC) ‡ National team caps and goals as of 23:43, 14 November 2026 (UTC)

Oihan Sancet Tirapu (born 25 April 2000) is a Spanish professional footballer who plays as an attacking midfielder for La Liga club Athletic Bilbao and the Spain national team.

== Club career ==
Born in Pamplona, Navarre, Sancet joined Athletic Bilbao's youth setup from Osasuna in 2015. On 18 June 2018, he was called up to pre-season with the first team by manager Eduardo Berizzo.

Skipping the usual step with CD Basconia (Athletic's farm team), Sancet made his senior debut with the reserves on 25 August 2018, starting and opening a 2–0 Segunda División B home win against Tudelano. In early September he suffered a knee injury (a tear to his left anterior cruciate ligament), returning to action the following March.

Sancet was included in the main squad by manager Gaizka Garitano for the 2019–20 season. He made his professional and La Liga debut on 16 August 2019, coming on as a second-half substitute for Óscar de Marcos in the 1–0 home victory over Barcelona. On 27 June – his sixth league start – he scored his first goal in a 3–1 defeat of Mallorca also at San Mamés. By December 2020, he had reached sufficient milestones to trigger a €150,000 development payment to Osasuna.

On 3 January 2022, Sancet scored a hat-trick to help his side come from behind at Osasuna to win 3–1. It was the first in the league scored by an Athletic player since Aritz Aduriz in 2016, with Sancet the youngest scorer of three in a match for the club since Julen Guerrero in 1994 and the first from Navarre to do so for any club against Osasuna, as well as being the first goals he had scored for the senior team away from Bilbao.

On 3 February 2023, Sancet scored three times in a 4–1 home win over Cádiz. In April, he extended his contract until 2032.

In the 2024 Copa del Rey final against Mallorca, Sancet scored Athletic's equalising goal at the start of the second half; his side went on to win the trophy via a penalty shootout.

On 8 February 2025, Sancet scored all of their goals in the 3–0 home victory against Girona; with three further strikes in as many matches taking his total for the period to six, he was named the La Liga Player of the Month for February 2025. He finished the campaign with a career-best 15, best in the squad.

== International career ==
Sancet earned his first cap for Spain at under-21 level on 10 October 2019, in a 1–1 friendly draw with Germany held in Córdoba. He played all the matches for the runners-up at the 2023 UEFA European Championship, scoring in the 5–1 semi-final defeat of Ukraine.

In October 2023, Sancet received his first call-up to the senior team for two UEFA Euro 2024 qualifiers with Scotland and Norway. He made his debut as a substitute against Scotland in Seville, and scored the second goal of a 2–0 win four minutes from time (described initially as an own goal by Ryan Porteous in some reports).

== Career statistics ==
=== Club ===
As of match played 20 November 2026

Appearances and goals by club, season and competition
Club	Season	League			Copa del Rey		Europe		Other		Total	
Club	Season	Division	Apps	Goals	Apps	Goals	Apps	Goals	Apps	Goals	Apps	Goals
Bilbao Athletic	2018–19	Segunda División B	10	1	—		—		—		10	1
Bilbao Athletic	2019–20	Segunda División B	14	6	—		—		1 (Note: Appearance in Segunda División B play-offs)	0	15	6
Bilbao Athletic	Total		24	7	—		—		1	0	25	7
Athletic Bilbao	2019–20	La Liga	17	1	2	0	—		—		19	1
Athletic Bilbao	2020–21	La Liga	24	2	2	0	—		0	0	26	2
Athletic Bilbao	2021–22	La Liga	27	6	4	0	—		2 (Note: Appearance(s) in Supercopa de España)	0	33	6
Athletic Bilbao	2022–23	La Liga	36	10	5	0	—		—		41	10
Athletic Bilbao	2023–24	La Liga	30	4	8	2	—		—		38	6
Athletic Bilbao	2024–25	La Liga	29	15	0	0	7 (Note: Appearances in UEFA Europa League)	2	0	0	36	17
Athletic Bilbao	2025–26	La Liga	28	4	3	1	6 (Note: Appearances in UEFA Champions League)	1	1	0	38	6
Athletic Bilbao	2026–27	La Liga	9	1	0	0	—		—		9	1
Athletic Bilbao	Total		200	43	24	3	13	3	3	0	240	49
Career total			224	50	24	3	13	3	4	0	265	56

=== International ===
Scores and results list Spain's goal tally first, score column indicates score after each Sancet goal.

List of international goals scored by Oihan Sancet
No.	Date	Venue	Opponent	Score	Result	Competition
1	12 October 2023	La Cartuja, Seville, Spain	Scotland	2–0	2–0	UEFA Euro 2024 qualifying

== Honours ==
Athletic Bilbao

- Copa del Rey: 2023–24
- Supercopa de España: 2021

Spain U18

- Mediterranean Games: 2018

Spain U21

- UEFA European Under-21 Championship runner-up: 2023

Individual

- La Liga Player of the Month: February 2025
