= Unai Simón =

Spanish footballer (born 1997)

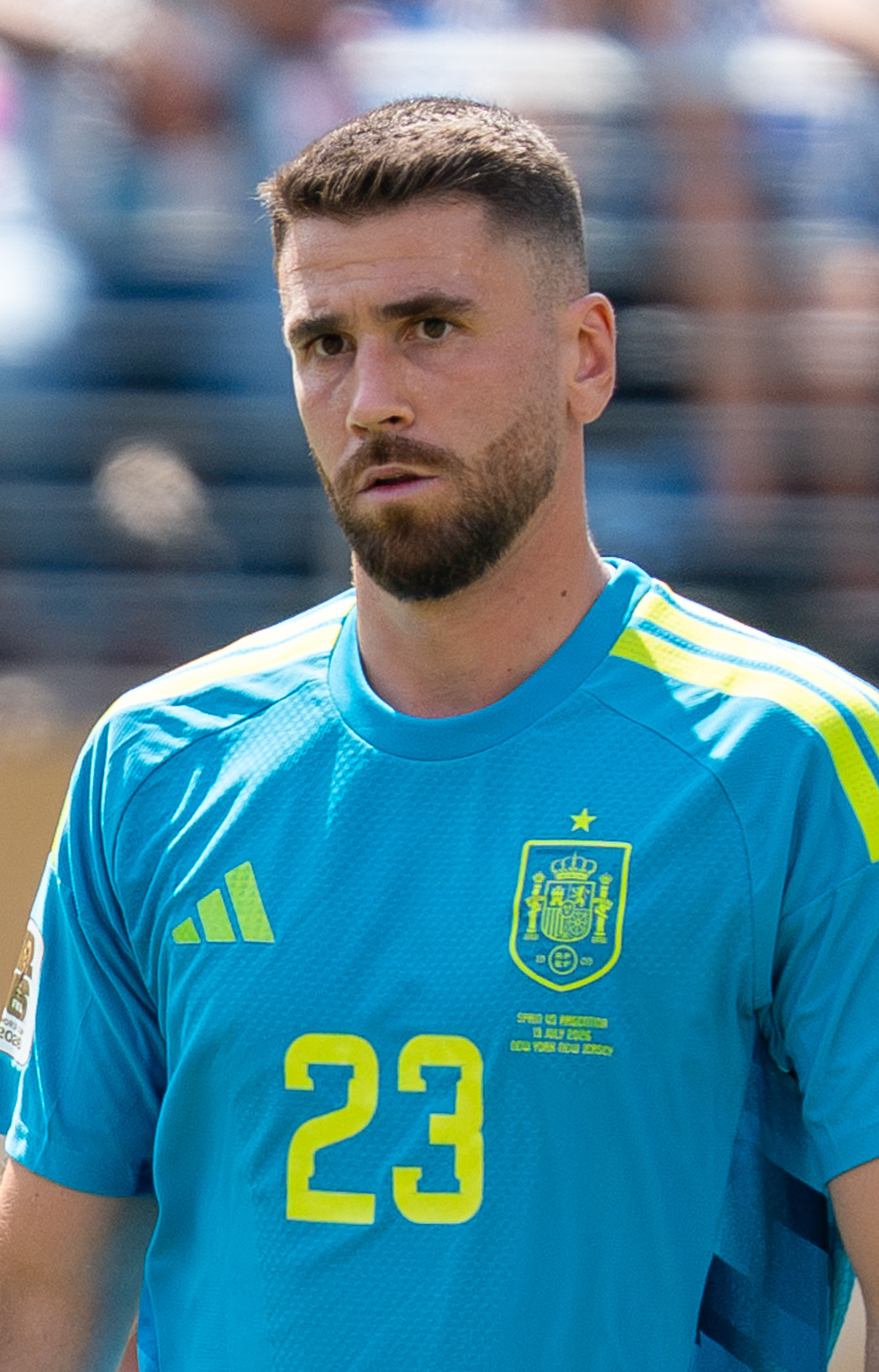
- Simón with Spain in 2026

Personal information
- Full name: Unai Simón Mendibil
- Date of birth: 11 June 1997 (age 29)
- Place of birth: Vitoria-Gasteiz, Álava, Spain
- Height: 1.90 m (6 ft 3 in)
- Position: Goalkeeper

Team information
- Current team: Athletic Bilbao
- Number: 1

Youth career
- 2010–2011: Aurrerá Vitoria
- 2011–2014: Athletic Bilbao

Senior career*
Years	Team	Apps	(Gls)
2014–2016	Basconia	36	(0)
2016–2018	Athletic Bilbao B	58	(0)
2018–	Athletic Bilbao	249	(0)

International career^{‡}
2013	Spain U16	1	(0)
2015	Spain U18	3	(0)
2015–2016	Spain U19	4	(0)
2017–2019	Spain U21	10	(0)
2021	Spain U23	7	(0)
2020–	Spain	71	(0)
Medal record
Men's football
Representing Spain
FIFA World Cup
Winner	2026 Canada–Mexico–US
UEFA European Championship
Winner	2024 Germany
Bronze medal – third place	2020 Europe
UEFA Nations League
Winner	2023 Netherlands
Runner-up	2025 Germany
Runner-up	2021 Italy
Olympic Games
Silver medal – second place	2020 Tokyo
UEFA European Under-21 Championship
Winner	2019 Italy–San Marino
UEFA European Under-19 Championship
Winner	2015 Greece
- * Club domestic league appearances and goals as of 20:16, 20 November 2026 (UTC) ‡ National team caps and goals as of 22:00, 15 November 2026 (UTC)

Unai Simón Mendibil (born 11 June 1997) is a Spanish professional footballer who plays as a goalkeeper for La Liga club Athletic Bilbao and the Spain national team.

Simón has spent his entire club career with Athletic, developing with their youth academy, farm team and reserves and making his senior debut in 2018, amassing 200 appearances by 2025.

After featuring for Spain at various youth levels, Simón made his senior international debut in 2020. He played at the UEFA European Championship in 2020 and 2024, and the FIFA World Cup in 2022 and 2026; at Euro 2024, he featured in all but one match as Spain won the tournament, and at the 2026 World Cup he conceded just one goal (against Belgium) in eight matches, winning the Golden Glove award as his country again finished as champions. For his 2026 efforts, he was awarded the Yashin Trophy, recognizing the world's best goalkeeper.

== Early life ==
Simón's father, a member of the Guardia Civil from the Province of Zamora, was assigned to a security posting in the Basque Country where he met Unai's mother, a member of the Ertzaintza (the local police force); their son was born in Vitoria-Gasteiz, Álava, Basque Country, and raised in the nearby village of Murgia.

He joined Athletic Bilbao's youth system in 2011 from Aurrerá Vitoria, lodging with a family in the Bilbao area.

== Club career ==
Simón made his debut as a senior with Basconia, Athletic's farm team, in the 2014–15 season, in the Tercera División. On 8 June 2016, he was promoted to the reserves, recently relegated to the Segunda División B. He immediately became a starter for the side, contributing with 29 appearances during the campaign.

On 2 June 2017, he was called up to the main squad for the pre-season by new first team manager José Ángel Ziganda, but continued to appear exclusively for the B-team. On 13 July 2018, he signed a contract extension until 2023, and was loaned to Segunda División side Elche two weeks later.

On 15 August 2018, after Kepa Arrizabalaga's departure from the club and Iago Herrerín's injury, Simón was recalled by Athletic before he had played a match for Elche. He initially appeared to be behind the older Álex Remiro in the queue for selection, but made his professional – and La Liga – debut five days later, starting in a 2–1 home win against Leganés. In just his third appearance in the top division, Simón played in a 1–1 draw with Real Madrid where he made several key saves and was named player of the match. However, when Herrerín regained full fitness in October 2018 he was made the starting goalkeeper, with Simón's only appearances over the subsequent four months coming in the Copa del Rey.

For the 2019–20 season, Simón was given the No. 1 squad number and began the campaign as first choice, keeping a clean sheet in an opening day win over Barcelona. He continued his strong form throughout the season, missing two fixtures with illness and completing 33 matches in the league, conceding 29 goals to finish third in the Zamora Trophy rankings. On the 37th, penultimate, matchday, he was sent off during the first half against Leganés for a 'last man' challenge outside the penalty area, with the resultant suspension ending his season a game early; with ten men, Athletic Bilbao lost 2–0 to end their slim hopes of qualifying for the UEFA Europa League.

In August 2020, he signed a new contract with the club running to the summer of 2025, with no buyout clause. In January 2021, he saved a penalty from Getafe's Jaime Mata. The following month he had a decisive role in the quarter-finals of the Copa del Rey, stopping two of the three penalties in the shootout at the Estadio Benito Villamarín against Real Betis.

During the 2021–22 season, he kept his place in the starting lineup and had several impressive performances, the most notable being against Levante and Getafe (both matches ending goalless). In the following season, with the arrival of Ernesto Valverde, he maintained his role as an undisputed starter in the league and performed at a good level. On 10 November 2023, in "one of his best moments as a professional", he saved a penalty from Celta Vigo striker Iago Aspas to keep the score level in a game his team went on to win. On 16 March 2024, he stopped another penalty from Luis Rioja of Alavés, starting a move which culminated in a goal for Athletic forty seconds later as they again went on to win; in addition, he consolidated his position as leader in the Zamora Trophy with his 15th clean sheet in the league. Having been the starter for Copa del Rey final defeats in 2020 and 2021, he played no active part as the club finally won the trophy in April 2024, watching from the bench as understudy Julen Agirrezabala was selected for all rounds of the tournament. At the end of the season, Simón extended his contract to 2029.

In October 2024, Simón was ranked in second place for the Yashin Trophy. He was unavailable for the first four months of the 2024–25 season due to rehabilitation after surgery on his wrist, which was carried out immediately after the Euros tournament ended. He made his 200th appearance for Athletic Bilbao in January 2025.

== International career ==
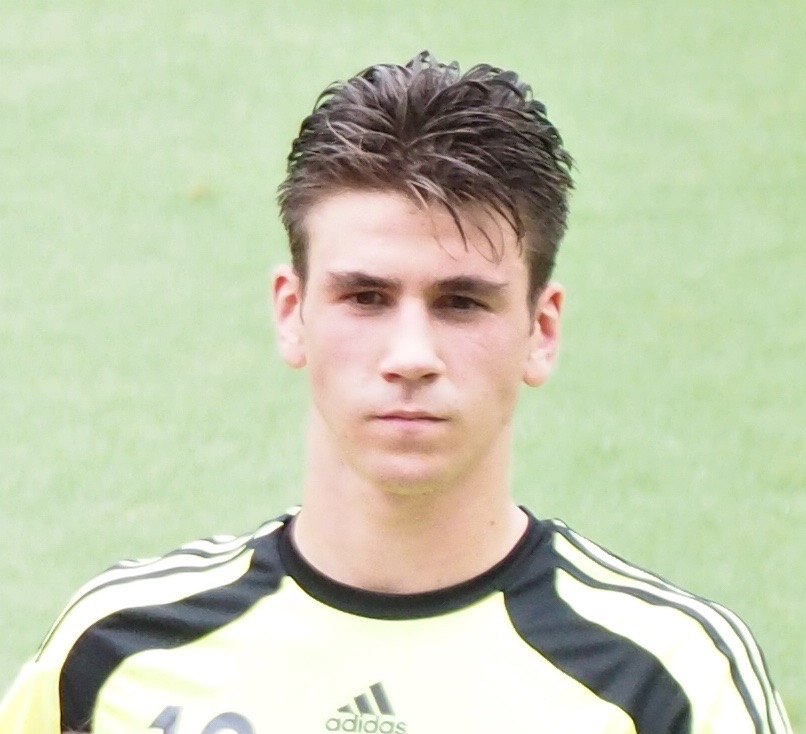
Simón with Spain U18 in 2015

=== Youth ===
Simón was selected for Spain at under-19 and under-21 levels. He was a member of the squad that won the 2015 UEFA European Under-19 Championship, albeit as the backup goalkeeper to Antonio Sivera during the tournament. In the same year he was in the Basque Country under-18 team that won the Spanish regional championship.

On 1 September 2017, Simón debuted with the under-21 team against Italy. He was selected for the 2019 UEFA European Under-21 Championship, playing the first game of the group stage as Spain once more finished as champions (Sivera was again first-choice).

=== Senior ===
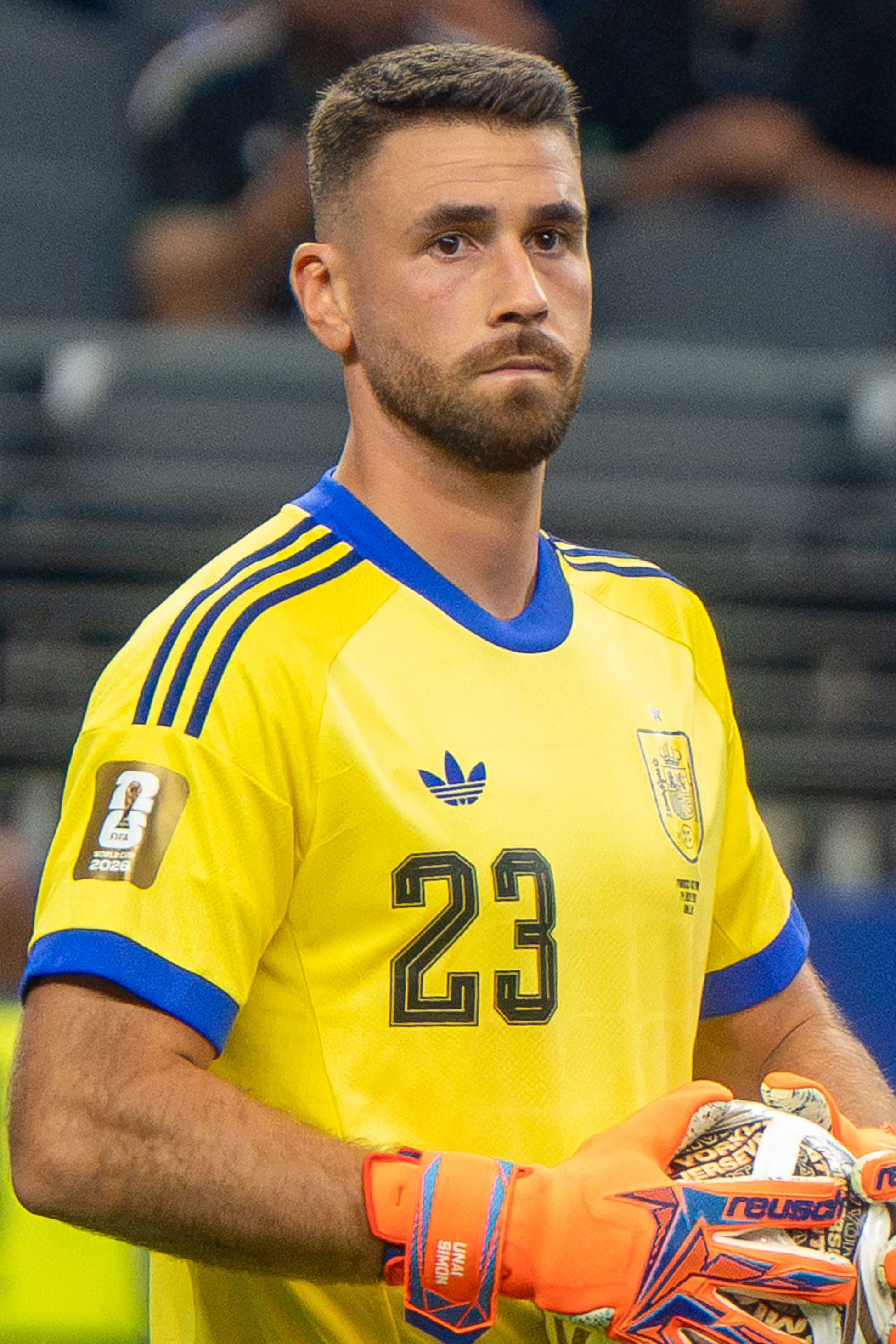
Simón with Spain at the 2026 FIFA World Cup

Simón received his first call-up to Spain senior team on 20 August 2020, for the 2020–21 UEFA Nations League matches against Germany and Ukraine. Despite having made an error which led to a goal at club level a few days earlier, he debuted in a friendly match against the Netherlands on 11 November, playing the entire match.

On 24 May 2021, Simón was included in Luis Enrique's 24-man squad for UEFA Euro 2020. Having displaced David de Gea as first-choice, he started all of the team's matches, and caused an own goal in the 5–3 round of 16 victory against Croatia when he was unable to control a long backwards pass by Pedri. Luis Enrique praised his mentality for having recovered from that mistake. He eventually saved two penalties as Spain won the shootout against Switzerland in the quarter-finals after a 1–1 draw, for which he was also awarded the Star of the Match. The semi-final against Italy ended with the same score, and Simón saved the first attempt in the shootout by Manuel Locatelli, but the Italians prevailed. Simón was also called up for the Spanish Olympic team for the delayed 2020 tournament in Japan. With Simón as the starting goalkeeper they reached the final, but lost to Brazil.

Simón was the starter at the 2022 FIFA World Cup, in which Spain progressed from their group with a victory, draw, and defeat – before losing 3–0 on penalties to Morocco in the round of 16 after a goalless draw. He saved from Badr Benoun, but the three of teammates failed with their efforts. Spain had better fortune in the 2023 UEFA Nations League final one year later, where another goalless draw against Croatia was followed by a 5–4 victory in the shootout to claim the title, Simón blocking attempts from Lovro Majer and Bruno Petković.

On 7 June 2024, Simón was named in Spain's squad for European Championships the same year. He started and played all matches except the final group stage match. In the latter, Simón played the full 90 minutes of the final as Spain beat England to become European champions for the fourth time.

On 25 May 2026, Simón was named in Spain's squad for the 2026 FIFA World Cup. He kept four clean sheets in the opening four matches of the tournament, and including the Morocco match from the previous edition, he equaled then passed Walter Zenga's record of five consecutive clean sheets set in 1990, reaching a total of 519 minutes without conceding, two minutes more than the previous benchmark. His record was later extended following Spain's 1–0 victory against Portugal in the round of 16, reaching 609 minutes and six clean sheets, and was further extended to a total of 650 minutes before Charles De Ketelaere of Belgium scored an equalizer in the quarterfinals, though Spain still progressed 2–1. That proved to be his only concession in the tournament as Spain defeated France 2–0, and Argentina 1–0 (after extra time) to win the tournament, with Simón being awarded the Golden Glove. With seven clean sheets, Simón set a new record for the most clean sheets recorded by a goalkeeper in a single World Cup tournament performance.

== Style of play ==
Simón is mainly known for his strong positioning, distribution, and anticipation as a goalkeeper. Being quick off his line and comfortable with the ball at his feet, he often acts as a sweeper keeper. He is also effective at stopping penalties. His Spain national team manager Luis de la Fuente has described him as "one of the best goalkeepers in the world."

== Career statistics ==
=== Club ===
As of match played 20 November 2026

Appearances and goals by club, season and competition
Club	Season	League			Copa del Rey		Europe		Other		Total	
Club	Season	Division	Apps	Goals	Apps	Goals	Apps	Goals	Apps	Goals	Apps	Goals
Basconia	2014–15	Tercera División	14	0	—		—		—		14	0
Basconia	2015–16	Tercera División	22	0	—		—		—		22	0
Basconia	Total		36	0	—		—		—		36	0
Bilbao Athletic	2016–17	Segunda División B	29	0	—		—		—		29	0
Bilbao Athletic	2017–18	Segunda División B	29	0	—		—		2 (Note: Appearances in Segunda División B play-offs)	0	31	0
Bilbao Athletic	Total		58	0	—		—		2	0	60	0
Athletic Bilbao	2018–19	La Liga	7	0	4	0	—		—		11	0
Athletic Bilbao	2019–20	La Liga	34	0	4 (Note: Includes appearance in 2020 Copa del Rey final (played in 2021))	0	—		—		38	0
Athletic Bilbao	2020–21	La Liga	37	0	4	0	—		2 (Note: Appearance(s) in Supercopa de España)	0	43	0
Athletic Bilbao	2021–22	La Liga	34	0	0	0	—		2	0	36	0
Athletic Bilbao	2022–23	La Liga	31	0	0	0	—		—		31	0
Athletic Bilbao	2023–24	La Liga	36	0	0	0	—		—		36	0
Athletic Bilbao	2024–25	La Liga	21	0	0	0	1 (Note: Appearance in UEFA Europa League)	0	1	0	23	0
Athletic Bilbao	2025–26	La Liga	37	0	0	0	8 (Note: Appearances in UEFA Champions League)	0	1	0	46	0
Athletic Bilbao	2026–27	La Liga	12	0	0	0	—		—		12	0
Athletic Bilbao	Total		249	0	12	0	9	0	6	0	276	0
Career total			343	0	12	0	9	0	8	0	372	0

=== International ===
As of match played 15 November 2026

Appearances and goals by national team and year
National team	Year	Apps	Goals
Spain	2020	3	0
Spain	2021	17	0
Spain	2022	11	0
Spain	2023	7	0
Spain	2024	8	0
Spain	2025	10	0
Spain	2026	15	0
Total		71	0

== Honours ==
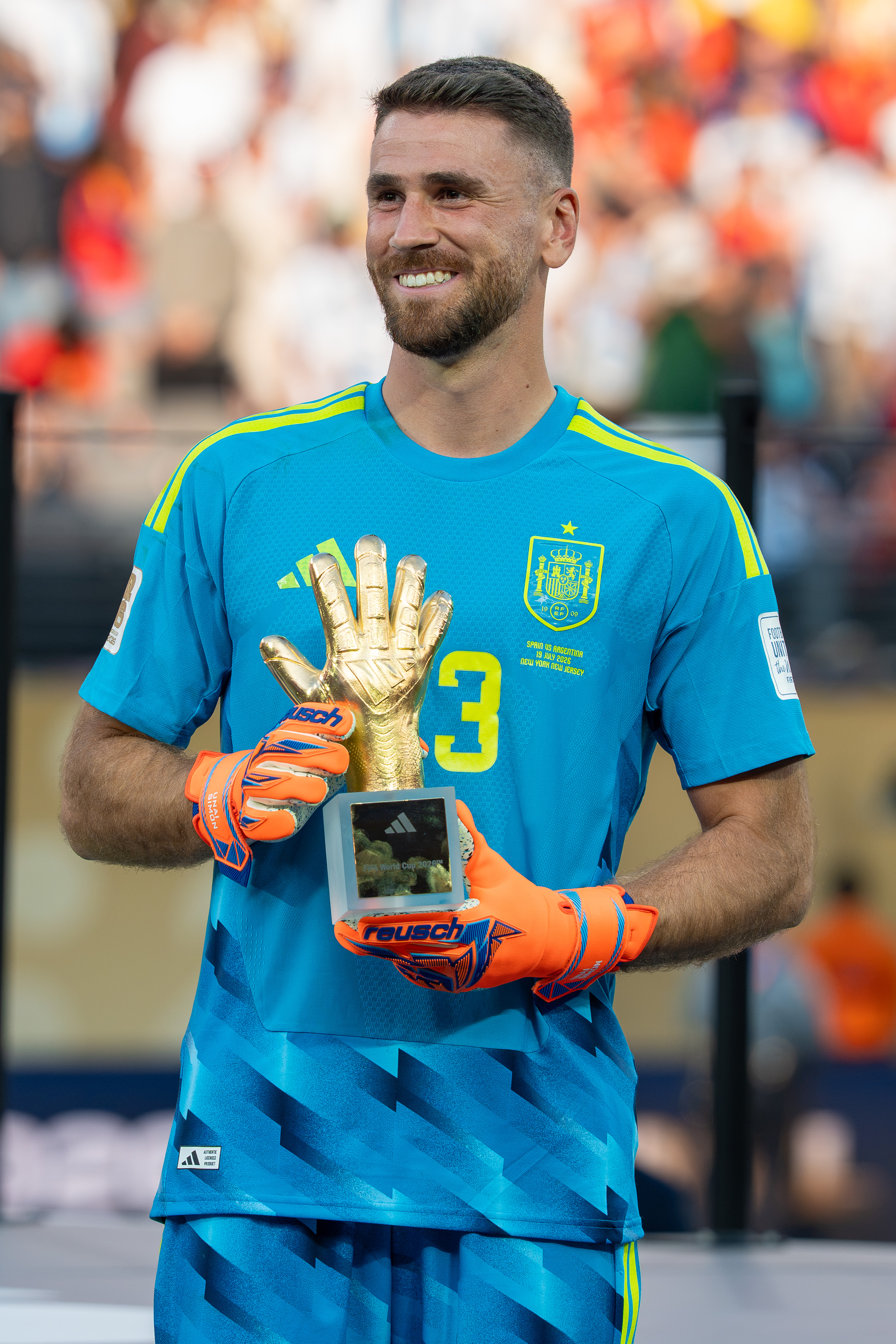
Simón with the 2026 FIFA World Cup Golden Glove

Athletic Bilbao

- Copa del Rey: 2023–24
- Supercopa de España: 2021

Spain U19

- UEFA European Under-19 Championship: 2015

Spain U21

- UEFA European Under-21 Championship: 2019

Spain U23

- Summer Olympic silver medal: 2020

Spain

- FIFA World Cup: 2026
- UEFA European Championship: 2024
- UEFA Nations League: 2022–23; runner-up: 2024–25

Individual

- UEFA La Liga Revelation Team of the Year: 2019–20
- La Liga Team of the Season: 2023–24
- La Liga Save of the Month: August 2026
- La Liga Zamora Trophy: 2023–24
- IFFHS Men's UEFA Team: 2024
- FIFA World Cup Golden Glove: 2026
- Yashin Trophy: 2026
