= Daniel Vivian =

Spanish footballer (born 1999)

Personal information
- Full name: Daniel Vivian Moreno
- Date of birth: 5 July 1999 (age 27)
- Place of birth: Vitoria-Gasteiz, Spain
- Height: 1.83 m (6 ft 0 in)
- Position: Centre-back

Team information
- Current team: Athletic Bilbao
- Number: 3

Youth career
- San Viator
- 2009–2011: Alavés
- 2011–2012: Lakua
- 2012–2015: Ariznabarra
- 2015–2016: Santutxu

Senior career*
Years	Team	Apps	(Gls)
2016–2018	Basconia	47	(0)
2017–2020	Bilbao Athletic	48	(4)
2020–	Athletic Bilbao	150	(8)
2020–2021	→ Mirandés (loan)	32	(2)

International career^{‡}
2019–	Basque Country	1	(0)
2024–	Spain	10	(0)
Medal record
Men's football
Representing Spain
UEFA European Championship
Winner	2024 Germany	Team
UEFA Nations League
Runner-up	2025 Germany	Team
- * Club domestic league appearances and goals as of 16:01, 25 October 2026 (UTC) ‡ National team caps and goals as of 23:14, 14 October 2025 (UTC)

Daniel "Dani" Vivian Moreno (born 5 July 1999) is a Spanish professional footballer who plays as a centre-back for La Liga club Athletic Bilbao and the Spain national team.

== Club career ==
Born in Vitoria-Gasteiz, Álava, Basque Country (to a father from Vilardevós in the province of Ourense, and a mother from Talavera de la Reina in the province of Toledo), Vivian represented CD San Viator, Deportivo Alavés, CD Lakua and CD Ariznabarra before joining Santutxu FC in 2015. He was assigned to Santutxu's Juvenil C squad, managed by Ibai Gómez. In June 2016, he moved to Athletic Bilbao, being initially a member of CD Basconia, the club's farm team in Tercera División.

Vivian made his senior debut on 27 August 2016, starting in a 1–1 away draw against Bermeo FT. He made his debut with the reserves on 15 October of the following year, starting in a 4–1 Segunda División B home routing of Peña Sport.

On 11 August 2020, Vivian renewed his contract until 2023 and was definitely promoted to the first team in La Liga. The following day, however, he was loaned to Segunda División side CD Mirandés for the 2020–21 season. Vivian made his professional debut for Mirandés on 13 September 2020, starting in a 0–0 home draw against AD Alcorcón. He scored his first goal as a professional the following 12 February, in a 3–3 home draw against Girona FC, and ended the campaign as a starter after contributing with 32 appearances.

On 16 August 2021, he made his La Liga debut with Athletic, in a goalless draw against Elche at the Estadio Martínez Valero. On 11 September, he scored his first goal for the club at San Mamés, in a 2−0 victory over RCD Mallorca, heading in a cross from Iker Muniain. In February 2022, on the back of some strong performances, he renewed his contract for four more years. On 20 February 2022, he scored the opening goal of a Basque derby fixture against Real Sociedad at San Mamés, which finished 4–0 to the Lions.

Following the departure of Iñigo Martínez and injury problems for Yeray Álvarez at the start of the 2023–24 season, the relatively inexperienced Vivian and Aitor Paredes (aged 24 and 23 respectively) formed an effective defensive partnership as the team challenged at the top end of the table, and won the Copa del Rey to end the club's 40-year unsuccessful sequence in the competition. In June 2024, he signed a new contract running til 2032.

== International career ==
Vivian debuted for the unofficial Basque Country national team in May 2019 during a goalless away draw against Panama for which a small, youthful and inexperienced squad was selected.

Vivian debuted for the Spanish senior squad on 22 March 2024 in a friendly match against Colombia. On 7 June 2024, after a season in which Athletic conceded the second-fewest goals across the league campaign, he was selected in the 26-man squad for UEFA Euro 2024. On 24 June, he made his first appearance in the Euros against Albania, playing the full match.

== Career statistics ==
=== Club ===
As of match played 25 October 2026

Appearances and goals by club, season and competition
Club	Season	League			Copa del Rey		Europe		Other		Total	
Club	Season	Division	Apps	Goals	Apps	Goals	Apps	Goals	Apps	Goals	Apps	Goals
Basconia	2016–17	Tercera División	30	0	—		—		—		30	0
Basconia	2017–18	Tercera División	14	0	—		—		—		14	0
Basconia	Total		44	0	—		—		—		44	0
Bilbao Athletic	2017–18	Segunda División B	4	0	—		—		—		4	0
Bilbao Athletic	2018–19	Segunda División B	32	2	—		—		—		32	2
Bilbao Athletic	2019–20	Segunda División B	12	2	—		—		1 (Note: Appearance in Segunda División B play-offs)	0	13	2
Bilbao Athletic	Total		48	4	—		—		1	0	49	4
Athletic Bilbao	2020–21	La Liga	—		—		—		—		0	0
Athletic Bilbao	2021–22	La Liga	24	2	3	0	—		0	0	27	2
Athletic Bilbao	2022–23	La Liga	29	1	7	0	—		—		36	1
Athletic Bilbao	2023–24	La Liga	33	0	7	0	—		—		40	0
Athletic Bilbao	2024–25	La Liga	32	4	2	0	11 (Note: Appearances in UEFA Europa League)	0	1 (Note: Appearance in Supercopa de España)	0	46	4
Athletic Bilbao	2025–26	La Liga	31	1	3	0	6 (Note: Appearances in UEFA Champions League)	0	1	0	41	1
Athletic Bilbao	2026–27	La Liga	1	0	0	0	—		—		1	0
Athletic Bilbao	Total		150	8	22	0	17	0	2	0	191	8
Mirandés (loan)	2020–21	Segunda División	32	2	0	0	—		—		32	2
Career total			274	14	22	0	17	0	3	0	316	14

=== International ===
As of match played 14 October 2025

Appearances and goals by national team and year
National team	Year	Apps	Goals
Spain	2024	8	0
Spain	2025	2	0
Total		10	0

== Honours ==
Athletic Bilbao

- Copa del Rey: 2023–24

Spain

- UEFA European Championship: 2024
- UEFA Nations League runner-up: 2024–25

Individual

- La Liga Team of the Season: 2024–25
