= Aitor Paredes =

Spanish footballer (born 2000)

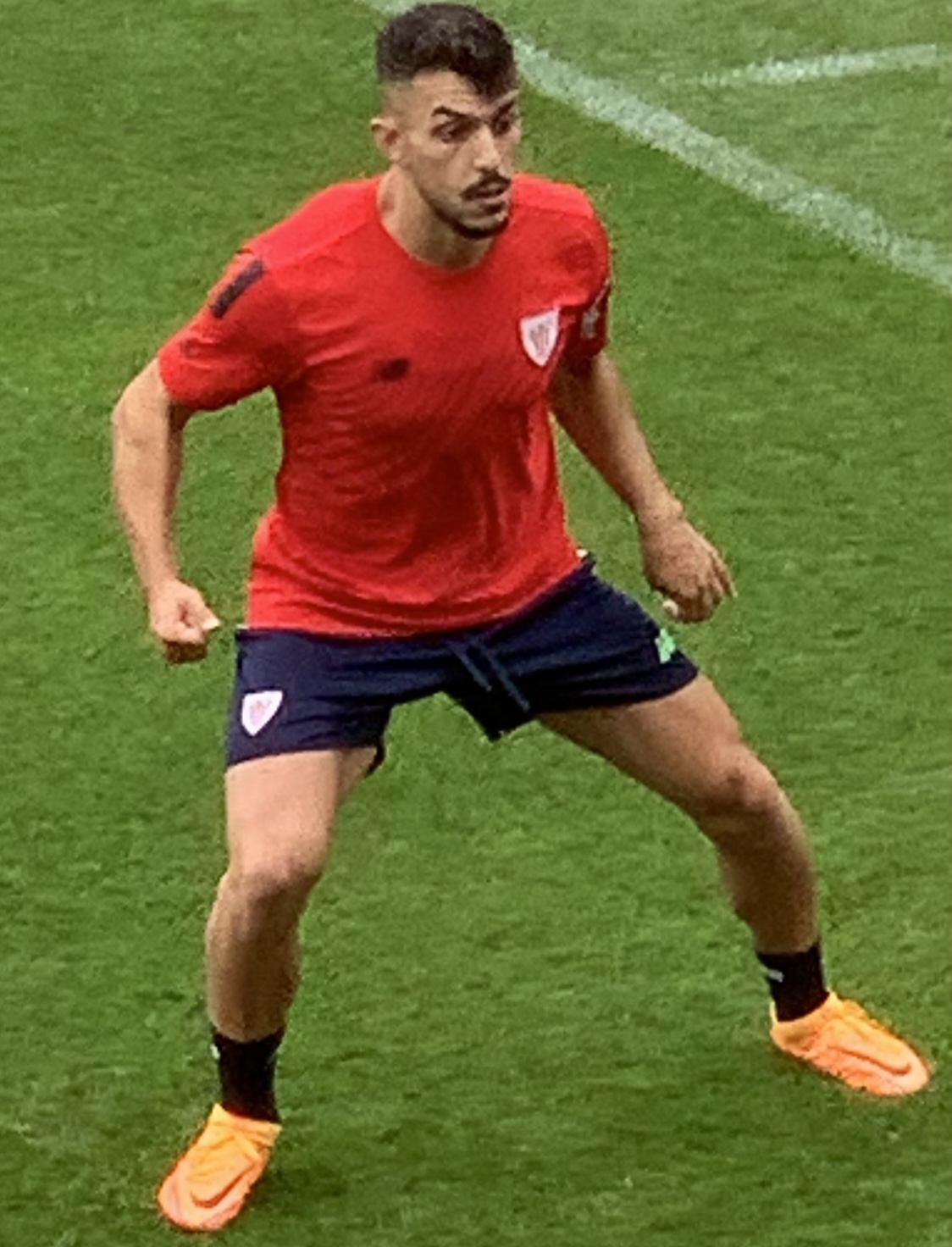
- Paredes in 2022

Personal information
- Full name: Aitor Paredes Casamichana
- Date of birth: 29 April 2000 (age 26)
- Place of birth: Bilbao, Spain
- Height: 1.86 m (6 ft 1 in)
- Position: Centre-back

Team information
- Current team: Athletic Bilbao
- Number: 4

Youth career
- 2006–2010: Etorkizun
- 2010–2018: Athletic Bilbao

Senior career*
Years	Team	Apps	(Gls)
2018–2020	Basconia	49	(2)
2019–2022	Bilbao Athletic	53	(4)
2021–	Athletic Bilbao	95	(7)

International career^{‡}
2018	Spain U18	4	(0)
2018–2019	Spain U19	4	(0)
2023	Spain U21	7	(0)
2024–	Spain	1	(0)
Medal record
Men's football
Representing Spain
UEFA European Under-21 Championship
Runner-up	2023 Georgia–Romania	Team
- * Club domestic league appearances and goals as of 25 October 2026 ‡ National team caps and goals as of 18 November 2024

Aitor Paredes Casamichana (born 29 April 2000) is a Spanish professional footballer who plays as a centre-back for La Liga club Athletic Bilbao and the Spain national team.

== Club career ==
Born in Bilbao, Biscay, Basque Country, Paredes joined Athletic Bilbao's youth setup in 2010 from Etorkizun KT, based in his hometown of Arrigorriaga. He made his senior debut with the farm team during the 2018–19 season, in Tercera División.

Paredes made his debut with the reserves on 6 December 2019, starting in a 0–1 Segunda División B away loss against SD Leioa. Promoted officially to the B-side in June 2020, he subsequently became a regular starter for the team, playing in 18 matches (play-offs included) of the 2020–21 campaign, scoring once in a 3–0 home victory against Barakaldo CF on 3 January 2021.

On 26 May 2021, Paredes renewed his contract with the Lions until 2025. He made his first team – and La Liga – debut on 29 August 2022, coming on as a late substitute for Iñigo Lekue in a 4–0 away routing of Cádiz CF. A short time prior to his debut he was the sixth-choice central defender in the squad, behind Iñigo Martínez, Yeray Álvarez, Daniel Vivian, Unai Núñez and Peru Nolaskoain. However, the latter pair left on loan, and injuries to the others gave Paredes some opportunities (nine starts and seven further appearances from the bench) during 2022–23.

From the start of the next season, with Martínez having joined FC Barcelona and Yeray still absent with physical issues, the relatively inexperienced Vivian and Paredes (aged 24 and 23 respectively) formed an effective defensive partnership as the team challenged at the top end of the table, and won the Copa del Rey to end the club's 40-year unsuccessful sequence in the competition. Paredes scored his first goal in the top tier on 4 January 2024, in a 2–0 away victory against Sevilla FC, and renewed his contract until 2029 on 21 March.

== International career ==
Paredes featured in the under-18, under-19, and under-21 categories of the Spanish national team. On 30 June 2018, he was proclaimed champion of the Mediterranean Games with the under-18 team managed by Luis de la Fuente, where he was a starter.

On 17 March 2023, Paredes was called up to the under-21 team led by Santi Denia. On 2 June of that year, he was called up to the squad taking part in the 2023 UEFA European Under-21 Championship in Georgia and Romania; he was part of the Starting XI in five of the six matches during the tournament, including the final against England.

On 18 November 2024, Paredes debuted for the Spanish senior squad in a Nations League match against Switzerland at Estadio Heliodoro Rodríguez López, playing the full match as the former national team won 3–2.

== Career statistics ==
=== Club ===
As of match played 25 October 2026

Appearances and goals by club, season and competition
Club	Season	League			Copa del Rey		Europe		Other		Total	
Club	Season	Division	Apps	Goals	Apps	Goals	Apps	Goals	Apps	Goals	Apps	Goals
Basconia	2018–19	Tercera División	29	2	—		—		—		29	2
Basconia	2019–20	Tercera División	20	0	—		—		—		20	0
Basconia	Total		49	2	—		—		—		49	2
Bilbao Athletic	2019–20	Segunda División B	7	0	—		—		—		7	0
Bilbao Athletic	2020–21	Segunda División B	16	1	—		—		2 (Note: Appearances in Segunda División B play-offs)	0	18	1
Bilbao Athletic	2021–22	Primera Federación	30	3	—		—		—		30	3
Bilbao Athletic	Total		53	4	—		—		2	0	55	4
Athletic Bilbao	2022–23	La Liga	16	0	1	0	—		—		17	0
Athletic Bilbao	2023–24	La Liga	34	1	6	0	—		—		40	1
Athletic Bilbao	2024–25	La Liga	23	3	2	0	10 (Note: Appearances in UEFA Europa League)	1	1 (Note: Appearance in Supercopa de España)	0	36	4
Athletic Bilbao	2025–26	La Liga	15	1	3	0	7 (Note: Appearances in UEFA Champions League)	0	1	0	26	1
Athletic Bilbao	2026–27	La Liga	7	2	0	0	—		—		7	2
Athletic Bilbao	Total		95	7	12	0	17	1	2	0	126	8
Career total			197	13	12	0	17	1	4	0	230	14

=== International ===
As of match played 18 November 2024

Appearances and goals by national team and year
National team	Year	Apps	Goals
Spain	2024	1	0
Total		1	0

== Honours ==
Athletic Bilbao

- Copa del Rey: 2023–24

Spain U21

- UEFA European Under-21 Championship runner-up: 2023
