= Imanol García de Albéniz =

Spanish footballer (born 2000)

Imanol
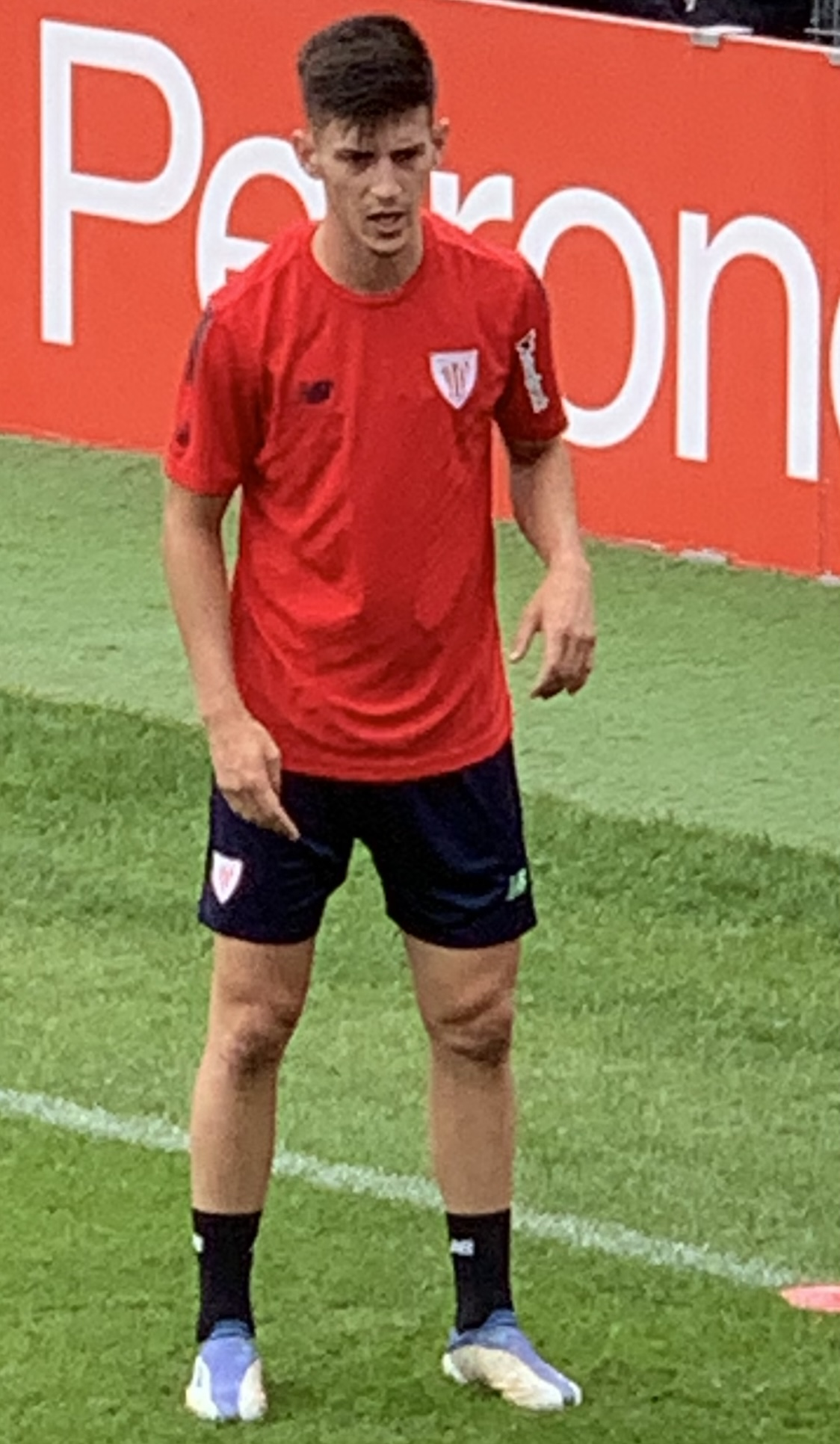
- Imanol training with Athletic Bilbao in 2022

Personal information
- Full name: Imanol García de Albéniz Crecente
- Date of birth: 8 June 2000 (age 26)
- Place of birth: Gallarta, Spain
- Height: 1.77 m (5 ft 10 in)
- Position: Left-back

Team information
- Current team: Eibar

Youth career
- Gallarta
- 2010–2018: Athletic Bilbao

Senior career*
Years	Team	Apps	(Gls)
2018–2019	Basconia	36	(1)
2019–2023	Bilbao Athletic	44	(2)
2021–2022	→ Mirandés (loan)	34	(2)
2022–2023	→ Eibar (loan)	27	(0)
2023–2024	Athletic Bilbao	9	(0)
2024–2026	Sparta Prague	1	(0)
2025	Sparta Prague B	1	(0)
2025–2026	→ Andorra (loan)	24	(1)
2026–	Eibar	0	(0)

International career^{‡}
2024–	Basque Country	1	(0)
- * Club domestic league appearances and goals as of 15 May 2026 ‡ National team caps and goals as of 24 March 2024

Imanol García de Albéniz Crecente (born 8 June 2000), sometimes known simply as Imanol, is a Spanish professional footballer who plays as a left-back for SD Eibar.

== Career ==
Imanol was born in Gallarta, Biscay, Basque Country, and joined Athletic Bilbao's Lezama youth academy in 2010 from hometown side CD Gallarta. He made his senior debut with the farm team on 26 August 2018, starting and scoring his team's second in a 2–2 Tercera División home draw against SD Deusto.

Imanol was promoted to the reserves in Segunda División B ahead of the 2019–20 season, and immediately became a regular starter for the side. He renewed his contract with the Lions until 2025 on 5 March 2021, and moved to Segunda División side CD Mirandés on a one-year loan deal on 1 July, along with Iñigo Vicente.

Imanol made his professional debut on 16 August 2021, starting in a 0–0 away draw against Málaga CF. He scored his first professional goal seven days later, netting his team's second in a 2–0 home win over SD Amorebieta.

On 14 July 2022, Imanol was loaned to SD Eibar in the second division for the season. In February 2023, he suffered an Achilles tendon rupture, being sidelined for the remainder of the campaign.

Back to Athletic in July 2023, Imanol was definitely assigned to the first team during the pre-season, and made his La Liga debut for the club as a second-half substitute on the opening matchday of the 2023–24 season, a 2–0 loss to Real Madrid at San Mamés.

On 16 July 2024, Imanol moved abroad for the first time in his career, joining Czech First League club AC Sparta Prague for an undisclosed fee. On 19 July of the following year, he returned to Spain and its second division, after agreeing to a one-year loan deal with FC Andorra.

On 9 July 2026, Imanol signed a three-year contract with SD Eibar also in division two.

== Career statistics ==
As of match played 10 August 2024

Appearances and goals by club, season and competition
Club	Season	League			Copa del Rey		Europe		Other		Total	
Club	Season	Division	Apps	Goals	Apps	Goals	Apps	Goals	Apps	Goals	Apps	Goals
Basconia	2018–19	Tercera Federación	36	1	—		—		—		36	1
Bilbao Athletic	2019–20	Segunda División B	20	1	—		—		1 (Note: Appearances in Segunda División B play-offs)	0	21	1
Bilbao Athletic	2020–21	Segunda División B	24	1	—		—		2	0	26	1
Bilbao Athletic	Total		44	2	—		—		3	0	47	2
Mirandés (loan)	2021–22	Segunda División	34	2	0	0	—		—		34	2
Eibar (loan)	2022–23	Segunda División	27	0	1	0	—		—		28	0
Athletic Bilbao	2023–24	La Liga	9	0	1	0	—		—		10	0
Sparta Prague	2024–25	Czech First League	1	0	0	0	2 (Note: Appearances in UEFA Champions League)	0	—		3	0
Career total			151	5	2	0	2	0	3	0	158	5

== Honours ==
Athletic Bilbao

- Copa del Rey: 2023–24
