= Euskal Herriko Futbol Txapelketa =

- Founded: 2016
- Region: Basque Country
- Teams: Varied
- Current champions: Athletic Bilbao (2026)
- Most championships: Athletic Bilbao (4)
- Website: ehkirola.eus

The Euskal Herriko Futbol Txapelketa (Basque Country Football Championship) is a football friendly competition run by Euskal Herria Kirola (Basque Country Sport). It is contested by teams from the Basque Country that play in La Liga.

It was first played in the 2016–17 season.

== Format ==
In the regular season, the scores of the games in La Liga played between the region's teams ('Basque football derbies') are used to create the standings. The best two teams qualify for the final, played in a neutral stadium.

== List of finals ==
Performance in regular season
Season	ALA	ATH	EIB	OSA	RSO
2016–17	2nd	1st	5th	4th	3rd
2017–18	3rd	2nd	4th		1st
2018–19	3rd	4th	2nd		1st
2019–20	3rd	4th	5th	2nd	1st
2020–21	3rd	4th	5th	2nd	1st
2021–22	4th	1st		3rd	2nd
2022–23		3rd		2nd	1st
2023–24	4th	1st		2nd	3rd
2024–25	3rd	1st		2nd	4th
2025–26	3rd	2nd	4th		1st

Season	Teams	1st in table	2nd in table	Final score
2017	5	Athletic Bilbao	Alavés	2–2 (Note: The match was abandoned on 90 minutes, when the officials decided to leave the field due to a scuffle involving players of both teams; no winner was decided.)
2018	4	Real Sociedad	Athletic Bilbao	0–1
2019	4	Real Sociedad	Eibar	1–2
2020	5	Real Sociedad	Osasuna	1–0
2021	5	Real Sociedad	Osasuna	1–3
2022	4	Athletic Bilbao	Real Sociedad	1–0
2023	3	Real Sociedad	Osasuna	1–3
2024	4	Athletic Bilbao	Osasuna	2–1
2025	4	Athletic Bilbao	Osasuna	0–1
2026	4	Real Sociedad	Athletic Bilbao	0–1

== Top goalscorers ==
Minimum of 6 goals in total for inclusion on list.

As of 4 August 2025

#	Player	Team (Note: In cases of players who played for more than one of the eligible clubs during the period, the name displayed is where he was playing when he scored the goals.)	16–17	17–18	18–19	19–20	20–21	21–22	22–23	23–24	24–25	Final	Total (Note: Other than the Txapela finals, which are considered to be friendly matches, all goals were scored in official La Liga fixtures.)
1=	Mikel Oyarzabal	Real Soc	0	3	3	7	0	0	1	2	0	0	16
1=	Iñaki Williams	Athletic	4	0	1	3	1	0	2	3	0	2 (Note: 1 goal in 2018 final, 1 goal in 2024 final.)	16
3	Ante Budimir	Osasuna	0	0	0	0	2	1	1	3	3	2 (Note: 2 goals in 2021 final.)	12
4	Raúl García	Athletic	3	1	2	4	0	1	0	0	0	0	11
5=	Willian José	Real Soc	1	1	3	3	0	0	0	0	0	2 (Note: 1 goal in 2020 final, 1 goal in 2021 final.)	10
5=	Kike García	Eibar / Osasuna	1	1	0	1	0	6	1	0	0	0	10
7	Alexander Isak	Real Soc	0	0	0	2	5	1	0	0	0	1 (Note: Goal in 2019 final.)	9
8	Oihan Sancet	Athletic	0	0	0	0	1	4	1	1	1	0	8
9=	Rubén García	Osasuna	0	0	0	3	1	0	0	1	1	1 (Note: Goal in 2024 final.)	7
9=	Iker Muniain	Athletic	2	1	1	1	0	2	0	0	0	0	7
11	Aritz Aduriz	Athletic	2	3	0	0	0	0	0	0	0	1 (Note: Goal in 2017 final.)	6

== 2016–17 ==
There were five eligible clubs and 20 fixtures between them in the 2016–17 La Liga campaign. Osasuna were relegated.

=== Relevant matches ===
27 August 2016 2/1	Osasuna	0–2	Real Sociedad	Pamplona
18:15 CEST		Report	Juanmi 45+2'; U. García 81' (o.g.)	Stadium: El Sadar; Attendance: 16,343; Referee: Alfonso Álvarez Izquierdo

24 September 2016 6/2	Eibar	2–0	Real Sociedad	Eibar
13:00 CEST	Illarramendi 57' (o.g.); Bebé 66'	Report	Elustondo (red card) 24'	Stadium: Ipurua; Attendance: 4,798; Referee: José María Sánchez Martínez

16 October 2016 8/3	Athletic Bilbao	3–2	Real Sociedad	Bilbao
16:15 CEST (UTC+02:00)	Aduriz 60'; Muniain 51'; Williams 72'	Report	I. Martínez 83'; Zurutuza 16'	Stadium: San Mamés; Attendance: 47,428; Referee: José González (Castile and Léon)

17 October 2016 8/4	Eibar	2–3	Osasuna	Eibar
20:45 CEST	Escalante 1'; Enrich 45'	Report	León 29', 32'; Torres 58'	Stadium: Ipurua; Attendance: 5,216; Referee: Mario Melero López

22 October 2016 9/5	Real Sociedad	3–0	Alavés	San Sebastián
18:30 CEST (UTC+02:00)	Prieto 22'; Willian José 57'; Vela 87'	Report		Stadium: Anoeta; Attendance: 24,224; Referee: Carlos Clos Gómez

30 October 2016 10/6	Athletic Bilbao	1–1	Osasuna	Bilbao
16:15 CET	García 28'	Report	Riera 23'	Stadium: San Mamés; Attendance: 43,396; Referee: José Luis Munuera Montero

5 November 2016 11/7	Osasuna	0–1	Alavés	Pamplona
18:30 CEST (UTC+02:00)		Report	Santos 77'	Stadium: El Sadar; Attendance: 15,929; Referee: Daniel Ocón Arráiz

4 December 2016 14/8	Athletic Bilbao	3–1	Eibar	Bilbao
16:15 CET (UTC+01:00)	Beñat 42'; Williams 55'; Muniain 90+1'	Report	Enrich 70'	Stadium: San Mamés; Attendance: 42,831; Referee: Javier Estrada (Catalonia)

11 December 2016 15/9	Eibar	0–0	Alavés	Eibar
12:00 CET (UTC+01:00)		Report		Stadium: Ipurua; Attendance: 5,666; Referee: Daniel Trujillo Suárez

8 January 2017 17/10	Athletic Bilbao	0–0	Alavés	Bilbao
12:00 CET (UTC+01:00)		Report		Stadium: San Mamés; Attendance: 42,182; Referee: Carlos del Cerro Grande

5 February 2017 21/11	Real Sociedad	3–2	Osasuna	San Sebastián
18:30 CET	Navas 62'; Vela 72'; Juanmi 77'	Report	Kodro 25'; León 79'	Stadium: Anoeta; Attendance: 21,893; Referee: Santiago Jaime Latre

1 March 2017 25/12	Real Sociedad	2–2	Eibar	San Sebastián
19:30 CET	Juanmi 14', (yellow card) 15' (yellow-red card) 59'; Vela 67' (pen.)	Report	Lejeune (yellow card) 13' (yellow-red card) 46'; Escalante 26'; Pedro León 90+3'	Stadium: Anoeta; Attendance: 20,335; Referee: Alberto Undiano Mallenco

12 March 2017 27/13	Real Sociedad	0–2	Athletic Bilbao	San Sebastián
12:00 CET (UTC+01:00)		Report	García 28' (pen.); Williams 56'	Stadium: Anoeta; Attendance: 25,557; Referee: José María Sánchez Martínez (Murcia)

13 March 2017 27/14	Osasuna	1–1	Eibar	Pamplona
20:45 CET	Kodro 79'	Report	Kike 72'	Stadium: El Sadar; Referee: Santiago Jaime Latre

18 March 2017 28/15	Alavés	1–0	Real Sociedad	Vitoria-Gasteiz
18:30 CET	Deyverson 44'	Report	Granero (yellow card) 59' (yellow-red card) 67'	Stadium: Mendizorrotza; Attendance: 19,840; Referee: Carlos del Cerro Grande

1 April 2017 29/16	Osasuna	1–2	Athletic Bilbao	Pamplona
16:15 CET	León 79'	Report	Aduriz 12'; Williams 44'	Stadium: El Sadar; Attendance: 15,755; Referee: José Luis Munuera Montero

5 April 2017 30/17	Alavés	0–1	Osasuna	Vitoria-Gasteiz
20:30		Report	Berenguer 88'	Stadium: Mendizorrotza; Attendance: 18,344; Referee: Xavier Estrada Fernández

24 April 2017 33/18	Eibar	0–1	Athletic Bilbao	Eibar
20:45 CEST (UTC+02:00)	Escalante (red card) 56'	Report	García 90+4'	Stadium: Ipurua; Attendance: 6,543; Referee: Carlos del Cerro (Madrid)

27 April 2017 34/19	Alavés	0–0	Eibar	Vitoria-Gasteiz
19:30 CEST		Report	Riesgo (red card) 26'	Stadium: Mendizorrotza; Attendance: 18,277; Referee: Daniel Trujillo Suárez

7 May 2017 36/20	Alavés	1–0	Athletic Bilbao	Vitoria-Gasteiz
12:00 CEST	Hernandez 53'	Report		Stadium: Mendizorrotza; Attendance: 19,127; Referee: Juan Martínez Munuera

=== Table ===
Pos	Team	Pld	W	D	L	GF	GA	GD	Pts	Qualification
1	Athletic Bilbao	8	5	2	1	12	6	+6	17	Qualified for the final
2	Alavés	8	3	3	2	3	4	−1	12	Qualified for the final
3	Real Sociedad	8	3	1	4	12	12	0	10	
4	Osasuna	8	2	2	4	9	12	−3	8	
5	Eibar	8	1	4	3	8	10	−2	7	

Source: RFEF

=== Final ===
12 August 2017	Athletic Bilbao	2–2 (Note: The match was abandoned on 90 minutes, when the officials decided to leave the field due to a scuffle involving players of both teams; no winner was decided.)	Alavés	Barakaldo, Spain
19:30 CEST (UTC+02:00)	Vesga 42'; Aduriz 56'	Report 1 Report 2	Ibai 52'; Santos 86' (pen.)	Stadium: Lasesarre; Referee: Daniel Palencia

== 2017–18 ==
There were four eligible clubs and 12 fixtures between them in the 2017–18 La Liga campaign.

=== Relevant matches ===
27 August 2017 2/1	Eibar	0–1	Athletic Bilbao	Eibar
18:15 CEST (UTC+02:00)	Jordán (yellow card) 49' (yellow-red card) 90+1'	Report	Aduriz 38'	Stadium: Ipurua; Attendance: 5,948; Referee: José María Sánchez Martínez (Murcia)

15 October 2017 8/2	Alavés	0–2	Real Sociedad	Vitoria-Gasteiz
18:30 CEST (UTC+02:00)		Report	Oyarzabal 77'; Elustondo 81'	Stadium: Mendizorrotza; Attendance: 19,840; Referee: Javier Alberola Rojas

5 November 2017 11/3	Real Sociedad	3–1	Eibar	San Sebastián
18:30 CET (UTC+01:00)	Willian José 12'; Januzaj 28'; Oyarzabal 46'	Report	Jordán 72'	Stadium: Anoeta; Attendance: 20,328; Referee: Trujillo Suárez

25 November 2017 13/4	Alavés	1–2	Eibar	Vitoria-Gasteiz
13:00 CET (UTC+01:00)	Santos (yellow card) 24' (yellow-red card) 45'; Burgui 90+1'	Report	Jordán 33'; Charles 69', (red card) 83'	Stadium: Mendizorrotza; Attendance: 19,272; Referee: José Luis Munuera Montero

16 December 2017 16/5	Athletic Bilbao	0–0	Real Sociedad	Bilbao
16:15 CET (UTC+01:00)		Report		Stadium: San Mamés; Attendance: 45,504; Referee: David Fernández (Andalusia)

7 January 2018 18/6	Athletic Bilbao	2–0	Alavés	Bilbao
18:30 CET (UTC+01:00)	Etxeita 8'; Aduriz 64' (pen.)	Report		Stadium: San Mamés; Attendance: 41,000; Referee: Pablo González (Asturias)

26 January 2018 21/7	Athletic Bilbao	1–1	Eibar	Bilbao
21:00 CET (UTC+01:00)	Aduriz 50'	Report	Kike 73'	Stadium: San Mamés; Attendance: 39,331; Referee: Mario Melero (Andalusia)

4 March 2018 27/8	Real Sociedad	2–1	Alavés	San Sebastián
--:-- CET (UTC+01:00)	Moreno 5'; Illarra 10'	Report	Alfonso Pedraza 38'	Stadium: Anoeta; Attendance: 21,334; Referee: Juan Martínez Munuera

1 April 2018 30/9	Eibar	0–0	Real Sociedad	Eibar
--:-- CEST (UTC+02:00)		Report		Stadium: Ipurua; Attendance: 6,192; Referee: José María Sánchez Martínez

15 April 2018 32/10	Eibar	0–1	Alavés	Eibar
--:-- CEST (UTC+02:00)		Report	Guidetti 5'	Stadium: Ipurua; Attendance: 5,754; Referee: Alberto Undiano Mallenco

28 April 2018 35/11	Real Sociedad	3–1	Athletic Bilbao	San Sebastián
16:15 CEST (UTC+02:00)	San José 15', 54' (o.g.); Oyarzabal 36'; Pardo (red card) 85'	Report	García 59' (pen.)	Stadium: Anoeta; Attendance: 23,972; Referee: José María Sánchez Martínez (Murcia)

12 May 2018 37/12	Alavés	3–1	Athletic Bilbao	Vitoria-Gasteiz
18:30 CEST (UTC+02:00)	Munir (yellow card) 35' (goal) 60'; Guidetti 43'; Ibai 77'	Report	Muniain 79'	Stadium: Mendizorrotza; Attendance: 19,458; Referee: Javier Estrada (Catalonia)

=== Table ===
Pos	Team	Pld	W	D	L	GF	GA	GD	Pts	Qualification
1	Real Sociedad	6	4	2	0	10	3	+7	14	Qualified for the final
2	Athletic Bilbao	6	2	2	2	6	7	−1	8	Qualified for the final
3	Alavés	6	2	0	4	6	9	−3	6	
4	Eibar	6	1	2	3	4	7	−3	5	

Source: RFEF

=== Final ===
4 August 2018	Real Sociedad	0–1	Athletic Bilbao	Irun, Spain
18:15 CEST (UTC+02:00)		Report 1 Report 2	Williams 47'	Stadium: Gal; Referee: Aitor Gorostegui

== 2018–19 ==
There were four eligible clubs and 12 fixtures between them in the 2018–19 La Liga campaign.

=== Relevant matches ===
31 August 2018 3/1	Eibar	2–1	Real Sociedad	Eibar
22:00 CEST (UTC+02:00)	Cucurella 26'; Charles 90+1'	Report	Willian José 15' (pen.)	Stadium: Ipurua; Attendance: 6,174; Referee: José María Sánchez Martínez

5 October 2018 8/2	Athletic Bilbao	1–3	Real Sociedad	Bilbao
21:00 CEST (UTC+02:00)	Muniain 32'}	Report	Oyarzabal 30' (pen.), 74' (pen.); Sangalli 47'	Stadium: San Mamés; Attendance: 46,684; Referee: Alejandro Hernández Hernández

21 October 2018 9/3	Eibar	1–1	Athletic Bilbao	Eibar
16:15 CEST (UTC+02:00)	Charles 17' (pen.)	Report	Williams 21'	Stadium: Ipurua; Attendance: 6,475; Referee: Jesús Gil Manzano (Extremadura)

4 November 2018 11/4	Eibar	2–1	Alavés	Eibar
	Jordán 59'; Diop 90+3'	Report	Jony 4'	Stadium: Ipurua; Attendance: 5,698; Referee: Javier Iglesias Villanueva

17 December 2018 16/5	Alavés	0–0	Athletic Bilbao	Vitoria-Gasteiz
		Report		Stadium: Mendizorrotza; Attendance: 19,349; Referee: Antonio Mateu Lahoz

21 December 2018 17/6	Real Sociedad	0–1	Alavés	San Sebastián
		Report	Calleri 11'	Stadium: Anoeta; Attendance: 22,431; Referee: Xavier Estrada Fernández

2 February 2019 22/7	Real Sociedad	2–1	Athletic Bilbao	San Sebastián
16:15 CET (UTC+01:00)	Oyarzabal 16'; Willian José 45'	Report	R. García 82'	Stadium: Anoeta; Attendance: 27,073; Referee: Antonio Mateu (Valencia)

23 February 2019 25/8	Athletic Bilbao	1–0	Eibar	Bilbao
20:45 CET (UTC+01:00)	R. García 1'	Report		Stadium: San Mamés; Attendance: 43,514; Referee: Mario Melero (Andalusia)

9 March 2019 27/9	Alavés	1–1	Eibar	Vitoria-Gasteiz
13:00 CET (UTC+01:00)	Inui 58'	Report	Cardona 71'	Stadium: Mendizorrotza; Attendance: 15,175; Referee: Javier Alberola Rojas

14 April 2019 32/10	Real Sociedad	1–1	Eibar	San Sebastián
16:15 CEST (UTC+02:00)	Juanmi 1'	Report	Jordán 85'	Stadium: Anoeta; Attendance: 24,308; Referee: Santiago Jaime Latre

27 April 2019 35/11	Athletic Bilbao	1–1	Alavés	Bilbao
13:00 CEST (UTC+02:00)	Beñat 41'	Report	Borja 45'	Stadium: San Mamés; Attendance: 40,402; Referee: Jesús Gil (Extremadura)

4 May 2019 36/12	Alavés	0–1	Real Sociedad	Vitoria-Gasteiz
18:30 CEST (UTC+02:00)		Report	Willian José 24'	Stadium: Mendizorrotza; Attendance: 18,509; Referee: Javier Alberola Rojas

=== Table ===
Pos	Team	Pld	W	D	L	GF	GA	GD	Pts	Qualification
1	Real Sociedad	6	3	1	2	8	6	+2	10	Qualified for the final
2	Eibar	6	2	3	1	7	6	+1	9	Qualified for the final
3	Alavés	6	1	3	2	4	5	−1	6	
4	Athletic Bilbao	6	1	3	2	5	7	−2	6	

Source: RFEF

=== Final ===
10 August 2019	Real Sociedad	1–2	Eibar	Tolosa, Gipuzkoa
20:30 CEST (UTC+02:00)	Isak 15'	Report	Oliveira 22'; De Blasis 74'	Stadium: Berazubi

== 2019–20 ==
There were five eligible clubs and 20 fixtures between them in the 2019–20 La Liga campaign (Osasuna were promoted as winners of the 2018–19 Segunda División, while the top-tier teams all finished in mid-table within 6 points of one another). During pre-season, the clubs came to an agreement that they would all charge away supporters a maximum of €25 for derby match tickets, following previous years where increased prices were being charged by some.

=== Relevant matches ===
24 August 2019 2/1	Osasuna	0–0	Eibar	Pamplona
CEST (UTC+02:00)				Stadium: El Sadar

30 August 2019 3/2	Athletic Bilbao	2–0	Real Sociedad	Bilbao
22:00 CEST (UTC+02:00)	Williams 11'; R. García 28'	Report		Stadium: San Mamés; Attendance: 46,391; Referee: Xavier Estrada Fernández (Catalonia)

22 September 2019 5/3	Athletic Bilbao	2–0	Alavés	Bilbao
18:30 CEST (UTC+02:00)	R. García 38' (pen.); Muniain 72'	Report		Stadium: San Mamés; Attendance: 45,143; Referee: Jesús Gil Manzano (Extremadura)

26 September 2019 6/4	Real Sociedad	3–0	Alavés	San Sebastián
21:00 CEST (UTC+2)	Oyarzabal 19', 41' (pen.); Willian José 32'	Report	García (yellow card) 74' (yellow-red card) 85'	Stadium: Anoeta; Attendance: 28,414; Referee: David Medié Jiménez

3 November 2019 12/5	Osasuna	4–2	Alavés	Pamplona
16:00 CET (UTC+1)	R. García 20'; Ávila 26'; Torres 45+6' (pen.); Villar 55' (pen.)	Report	Laguardia 27'; Pérez 51' (pen.)	Stadium: El Sadar; Attendance: 15,954; Referee: José Luis Munuera Montero

24 November 2019 14/6	Osasuna	1–2	Athletic Bilbao	Pamplona
14:00 CET (UTC+01:00)	Ávila 76'	Report	Williams 21'; Kodro 79'	Stadium: El Sadar; Attendance: 16,145; Referee: José Sánchez (Murcia)

24 November 2019 14/7	Eibar	0–2	Alavés	Eibar
16:00 CET (UTC+01:00)		Report	Joselu 85', 90+1'	Stadium: Ipurua; Attendance: 6,315; Referee: Mateu Lahoz (Valencian Community)

30 November 2019 15/8	Real Sociedad	4–1	Eibar	San Sebastián
16:00 CET (UTC+1)	Le Normand 25'; Oyarzabal 47', 80'; Willian José 57'	Report	Diop 35'	Stadium: Anoeta; Attendance: 28,535; Referee: Carlos del Cerro Grande

14 December 2019 17/9	Athletic Bilbao	0–0	Eibar	Bilbao
18:30 CET (UTC+1)		Report		Stadium: San Mamés; Attendance: 43,384; Referee: Mario Melero López

22 December 2019 18/10	Osasuna	3–4	Real Sociedad	Pamplona
14:00 CET (UTC+1)	Aridane 45+1'; Ávila 48', 84'; Roncaglia (red card) 70'	Report	Oyarzabal 15'; Portu 18'; Ødegaard 28'; Isak 79'	Stadium: El Sadar; Attendance: 16,197; Referee: David Medié Jiménez

7 February 2020 23/11	Alavés	2–1	Eibar	Vitoria-Gasteiz
21:00 CET (UTC+01:00)	Pérez 46'; Burke 66'	Report	Orellana 83'	Stadium: Mendizorrotza; Attendance: 17,089; Referee: Prieto Iglesias (Navarre)

9 February 2020 23/12	Real Sociedad	2–1	Athletic Bilbao	San Sebastián
14:00 CET (UTC+01:00)	Portu 65'; Isak 83'	Report	Williams 71'; Muniain (red card) 89'	Stadium: Anoeta; Attendance: 36,730; Referee: José Luis Munuera Montero (Andalusia)

16 February 2020 24/13	Athletic Bilbao	0–1	Osasuna	Bilbao
18:30 CET (UTC+01:00)		Report	Oier 29'	Stadium: San Mamés; Attendance: 44,286; Referee: Pablo González (Asturia)

23 February 2020 25/14	Alavés	2–1	Athletic Bilbao	Vitoria-Gasteiz
14:00 CET (UTC+01:00)	Pérez 28' (pen.); Ely 90+1'	Report	R. García 17'	Stadium: Mendizorrotza; Attendance: 15,749; Referee: Antonio Mateu (Valencia)

10 March 2020 (Note: Match originally scheduled for 16 February, but postponed due to air contamination, and rearranged for 10 March.) 24/15	Eibar	1–2	Real Sociedad	Eibar
20:00 CET (UTC+1)	Charles 90' (pen.)	Report	Oyarzabal 16' (pen.); Willian José 75'	Stadium: Ipurua Municipal Stadium; Attendance: 0 (Note: Match played behind closed doors due to the COVID-19 pandemic in Spain.); Referee: David Medié Jiménez

14 June 2020 (Note: Originally scheduled for 15 March; postponed due to the COVID-19 pandemic, played behind closed doors.) 28/16	Real Sociedad	1–1	Osasuna	San Sebastián
22:00 CEST (UTC+2)	Oyarzabal 61'	Report	Adrián 29' (pen.)	Stadium: Anoeta; Attendance: 0 Referee: Adrián Cordero Vega

17 June 2020 (Note: Originally scheduled for 21 March; postponed due to the COVID-19 pandemic, played behind closed doors.) 29/17	Eibar	2–2	Athletic Bilbao	Eibar
19:30 CEST (UTC+02:00)	Kike 19'; Orellana 78' (pen.)	Report	R. García 8' (pen.)Villalibre 81'	Stadium: Ipurua; Attendance: 0 Referee: Eduardo Prieto (Navarre)

18 June 2020 (Note: Originally scheduled for 22 March; postponed due to the COVID-19 pandemic, played behind closed doors.) 29/18	Alavés	2–0	Real Sociedad	Vitoria-Gasteiz
19:30 CEST (UTC+2)	Sainz 56'; Pina (yellow card) 71' (yellow-red card) 87'; Aguirregabiria 90+6'	Report	Zaldúa (yellow card) 54' (yellow-red card) 81'	Stadium: Mendizorrotza; Attendance: 0 Referee: Santiago Jaime Latre

24 June 2020 (Note: Originally scheduled for 12 April, postponed due to the COVID-19 pandemic; played behind closed doors.) 31/19	Alavés	0–1	Osasuna	Vitoria-Gasteiz
19:30 CEST (UTC+2)		Report	Lato 64'	Stadium: Mendizorrotza; Attendance: 0 Referee: Alejandro Hernández Hernández

2 July 2020 (Note: Originally scheduled for 26 April, postponed due to the COVID-19 pandemic; played behind closed doors.) 33/20	Eibar	0–2	Osasuna	Eibar
19:30 CEST (UTC+2)		Report	R. García 6', 74'	Stadium: Ipurua Municipal Stadium; Attendance: 0 Referee: José Luis Munuera Montero

=== Table ===
Pos	Team	Pld	W	D	L	GF	GA	GD	Pts	Qualification
1	Real Sociedad	8	5	1	2	16	11	+5	16	Qualified for the final
2	Osasuna	8	4	2	2	13	9	+4	14	Qualified for the final
3	Alavés	8	4	0	4	10	12	−2	12	
4	Athletic Bilbao	8	3	2	3	10	8	+2	11	
5	Eibar	8	0	3	5	5	14	−9	3	

Source: RFEF

=== Final ===
5 September 2020	Real Sociedad	1–0	Osasuna	San Sebastián
20:30 CEST (UTC+02:00)	Willian José 32' (pen.)			Stadium: Anoeta; Attendance: 0 (Note: Behind closed doors); Referee: Ibai Rezola Etxeberria (Basque Country)

== 2020–21 ==
There were five eligible clubs and 20 fixtures between them in the 2020–21 La Liga campaign (the delayed 2020 Copa del Rey final between Athletic and Real Sociedad is not included). Eibar's seven-year spell in the top division came to an end.

=== Relevant matches ===
27 September 2020 3/1	Eibar	1–2	Athletic Bilbao	Eibar
14:00 CEST (UTC+2)	Kike 48'	Report	López 40', 87'	Stadium: Ipurua; Attendance: 0 (Note: The match was played behind closed doors due to the COVID-19 pandemic in Spain.); Referee: Cordero Vega (Cantabria)

4 October 2020 5/2	Alavés	1–0	Athletic Bilbao	Vitoria-Gasteiz
14:00 CEST (UTC+2)	Ely 74'; Duarte (yellow card) 85' (yellow-red card) 86'	Report		Stadium: Mendizorrotza; Attendance: 0 Referee: José María Sánchez Martínez

18 October 2020 6/3	Eibar	0–0	Osasuna	Eibar
12:00 CEST (UTC+2)		Report	Moncayola (yellow card) 40' (yellow-red card) 88'	Stadium: Ipurua; Attendance: 0 Referee: Medié Jiménez (Catalunya)

24 October 2020 7/4	Osasuna	1–0	Athletic Bilbao	Pamplona
18:30 CEST (UTC+2)	Ru. García 81' (pen.)	Report		Stadium: El Sadar Stadium; Attendance: 0 Referee: Guillermo Cuadra Fernández

6 December 2020 12/5	Alavés	0–0	Real Sociedad	Vitoria-Gasteiz
21:00 CET (UTC+1)	Battaglia (red card) 61'	Report		Stadium: Mendizorrotza; Attendance: 0 Referee: José Luis Munuera Montero

13 December 2020 13/6	Real Sociedad	1–1	Eibar	San Sebastián
14:00 CET (UTC+1)	Barrenetxea 20'	Report	Enrich 65'	Stadium: Anoeta; Attendance: 0 Referee: Díaz de Mera

23 December 2020 15/7	Alavés	2–1	Eibar	Vitoria-Gasteiz
22:00 CET (UTC+1)	Méndez 41'; Deyverson 45+2'	Report	León 4'	Stadium: Mendizorrotza; Attendance: 0 Referee: Del Cerro Grande (Community of Madrid)

31 December 2020 16/8	Athletic Bilbao	0–1	Real Sociedad	Bilbao
14:00 CET (UTC+1)		Report	Portu 5'	Stadium: San Mamés; Attendance: 0 Referee: José María Sánchez Martínez

31 December 2020 16/9	Osasuna	1–1	Alavés	Pamplona
16:15 CET (UTC+1)	Rubén (red card) 8'; Torres 67'	Report	Pérez 75' (pen.)	Stadium: El Sadar; Attendance: 0 Referee: Santiago Jaime Latre

3 January 2021 17/10	Real Sociedad	1–1	Osasuna	San Sebastián
18:30 CET (UTC+1)	Barrenetxea 46'	Report	Calleri 20'	Stadium: Anoeta; Attendance: 0 Referee: Valentín Pizarro Gómez

7 February 2021 22/11	Osasuna	2–1	Eibar	Pamplona
18:30 CET (UTC+1)	Calleri 18'; Budimir 86'	Report	Kike 44'	Stadium: El Sadar; Attendance: 0 Referee: Figueroa Vázquez

21 February 2021 24/12	Real Sociedad	4–0	Alavés	San Sebastián
16:15 CET (UTC+1)	Isak 41', 49', 62'; Portu 73'	Report		Stadium: Anoeta; Attendance: 0 Referee: José Luis Munuera Montero

27 February 2021 25/13	Alavés	0–1	Osasuna	Vitoria-Gasteiz
18:30 CET (UTC+1)		Report	Barja 77'	Stadium: Mendizorrotza; Attendance: 0 Referee: José María Sánchez Martínez

20 March 2021 28/14	Athletic Bilbao	1–1	Eibar	Bilbao
14:00 CET (UTC+1)	Berchiche 9'	Report	Kike 17'	Stadium: San Mamés; Attendance: 0 Referee: Valentín Pizarro Gómez

7 April 2021 29/15	Real Sociedad	1–1	Athletic Bilbao	San Sebastián
21:00 CEST (UTC+2)	López 89'	Report	Villalibre 85'	Stadium: Anoeta; Attendance: 0 Referee: José María Sánchez Martínez

10 April 2021 30/16	Athletic Bilbao	0–0	Alavés	Bilbao
16:15 CEST (UTC+2)		Report		Stadium: San Mamés; Attendance: 0 Referee: Mario Melero López

26 April 2021 32/17	Eibar	0–1	Real Sociedad	Eibar
21:00 CEST (UTC+2)		Report	Isak 26'	Stadium: Ipurua; Attendance: 0 Referee: Figueroa Vázquez (Andalusia)

1 May 2021 34/18	Eibar	3–0	Alavés	Eibar
14:00 CEST (UTC+2)	Kike 3', 50', 59'	Report		Stadium: Ipurua; Attendance: 0 Referee: Munuera Montero (Andalusia)

8 May 2021 35/19	Athletic Bilbao	2–2	Osasuna	Bilbao
21:00 CEST (UTC+2)	Morcillo 1'; Sancet 62'	Report	Brašanac 12'; Budimir 89'	Stadium: San Mamés; Attendance: 0 Referee: Valentín Pizarro Gómez

22 May 2021 38/20	Osasuna	0–1	Real Sociedad	Pamplona
18:00 CEST (UTC+2)		Report	Isak 86'	Stadium: El Sadar; Attendance: 0 Referee: Jorge Figueroa Vázquez

=== Table ===
Pos	Team	Pld	W	D	L	GF	GA	GD	Pts	Qualification
1	Real Sociedad	8	4	4	0	10	3	+7	16	Qualified for the final
2	Osasuna	8	3	4	1	8	6	+2	13	Qualified for the final
3	Alavés	8	2	3	3	4	10	−6	9	
4	Athletic Bilbao	8	1	4	3	6	8	−2	7	
5	Eibar	8	1	3	4	8	9	−1	6	

Updated to match(es) played on 26 May 2021. Source: Soccerway

=== Final ===
6 August 2021	Real Sociedad	1–3	Osasuna	Irun
20:30 CEST (UTC+02:00)	Willian José 55'		Budimir 32', 65'; Grau 78'	Stadium: Stadium Gal; Attendance: 1,000; Referee: Aimar Velasco Arbaiza

== 2021–22 ==
There were four eligible clubs and 12 fixtures between them in the 2021–22 La Liga campaign. Alavés were relegated.

=== Relevant matches ===
18 September 2021 5/1	Alavés	0–2	Osasuna	Vitoria-Gasteiz
21:00 CEST (UTC+2)		Report	D. García 22'; Torres 29' (pen.)	Stadium: Mendizorrotza; Referee: Alejandro Hernández Hernández

1 October 2021 8/2	Athletic Bilbao	1–0	Alavés	Bilbao
21:00 CEST (UTC+2)	R. García (penalty missed) 9', 44'	Report		Stadium: San Mamés; Attendance: 28,665; Referee: Carlos del Cerro Grande

31 October 2021 12/3	Real Sociedad	1–1	Athletic Bilbao	San Sebastián
21:00 CET (UTC+1)	Isak 58' (pen.)	Report	Martínez (yellow card) 56' (yellow-red card) 84'; Muniain 90+1'	Stadium: Anoeta; Attendance: 37,066; Referee: Juan Martínez Munuera

7 November 2021 13/4	Osasuna	0–2	Real Sociedad	Pamplona
18:30 CET (UTC+1)		Report	Merino 72'; Januzaj 82' (pen.)	Stadium: El Sadar; Attendance: 21,741; Referee: Miguel Ángel Ortiz Arias

2 January 2022 19/5	Alavés	1–1	Real Sociedad	Vitoria-Gasteiz
18:30 CET (UTC+1)	Joselu 58' (pen.)	Report	Januzaj 14'	Stadium: Mendizorrotza; Attendance: 13,498; Referee: Carlos del Cerro Grande

3 January 2022 19/6	Osasuna	1–3	Athletic Bilbao	Pamplona
21:00 CET (UTC+1)	Kike 10'; Ávila (yellow card) 90+2' (yellow-red card) 90+4'	Report	Sancet 16', 25', 68'	Stadium: El Sadar; Attendance: 16,206; Referee: Miguel Ángel Ortiz Arias

9 January 2022 20/7	Alavés	0–0	Athletic Bilbao	Vitoria-Gasteiz
18:30 CET (UTC+1)		Report		Stadium: Mendizorrotza; Attendance: 14,103; Referee: Santiago Jaime Latre

20 February 2022 25/8	Athletic Bilbao	4–0	Real Sociedad	Bilbao
21:00 CET (UTC+1)	Muniain (penalty missed) 32', 89'; Vivian 68'; Sancet 72'; I. Williams 80'	Report		Stadium: San Mamés; Attendance: 40,698; Referee: Juan Martínez Munuera

27 February 2022 26/9	Real Sociedad	1–0	Osasuna	San Sebastián
18:30 CET (UTC+1)	Elustondo 52'	Report		Stadium: Anoeta; Attendance: 23,000; Referee: Antonio Mateu Lahoz

13 March 2022 28/10	Real Sociedad	1–0	Alavés	San Sebastián
18:30 CET (UTC+1)	Zubimendi 70'	Report		Stadium: Anoeta; Attendance: 31,573; Referee: Jorge Figueroa Vázquez

10 April 2022 31/11	Osasuna	1–0	Alavés	Pamplona
14:00 CEST (UTC+2)	Vidal; Budimir 90+2'; R. García (penalty missed) 37'	Report		Stadium: El Sadar; Attendance: 19,220; Referee: Alejandro Muñiz Ruiz

15 May 2022 37/12	Athletic Bilbao	2–0	Osasuna	Bilbao
19:30 CEST (UTC+2)	Berenguer 33'; Villalibre 79'	Report		Stadium: San Mamés; Attendance: 37,869; Referee: Jorge Figueroa Vázquez

=== Table ===
Pos	Team	Pld	W	D	L	GF	GA	GD	Pts	Qualification
1	Athletic Bilbao (Q)	6	4	2	0	11	2	+9	14	Qualified for the final
2	Real Sociedad (Q)	6	3	2	1	6	6	0	11	Qualified for the final
3	Osasuna	6	2	0	4	4	8	−4	6	
4	Alavés	6	0	2	4	1	6	−5	2	

Source: Soccerway

=== Final ===
5 August 2022	Athletic Bilbao	1–0	Real Sociedad	Barakaldo
20:45 CEST (UTC+02:00)	Vesga 22'		Rico (red card) 71'	Stadium: Estadio Lasesarre

== 2022–23 ==
There were three eligible clubs and six fixtures between them in the 2022–23 La Liga campaign (the 2022–23 Copa del Rey semi-final tie between Athletic Bilbao and Osasuna is not included). Alavés won promotion back to the top tier for the following campaign.

=== Relevant matches ===
31 December 2022 15/1	Real Sociedad	2–0	Osasuna	San Sebastián
16:15 CET (UTC+1)	Méndez 22'; Sørloth 64'	Report		Stadium: Reale Arena; Attendance: 34,847; Referee: Valentín Pizarro Gómez

9 January 2023 16/2	Athletic Bilbao	0–0	Osasuna	Bilbao
21:00 CET (UTC+1)		Report		Stadium: San Mamés; Attendance: 39,216; Referee: Mario Melero López

14 January 2023 17/3	Real Sociedad	3–1	Athletic Bilbao	San Sebastián
21:00 CET (UTC+1)	Sørloth 25'; Kubo 37'; Oyarzabal 62' (pen.)	Report	Sancet 40'; Yeray (red card) 60'	Stadium: Reale Arena; Attendance: 38,229; Referee: Guillermo Cuadra Fernández

15 April 2023 29/4	Athletic Bilbao	2–0	Real Sociedad	Bilbao
16:15 CEST (UTC+2)	I. Williams 33', 70'	Report		Stadium: San Mamés; Attendance: 49,287; Referee: César Soto Grado

28 April 2023 32/5	Osasuna	0–2	Real Sociedad	Pamplona
21:00 CEST (UTC+2)		Report	Herrera 6' (o.g.); Kubo 90'	Stadium: El Sadar; Attendance: 21,570; Referee: Valentín Pizarro Gómez

25 May 2023 36/6	Osasuna	2–0	Athletic Bilbao	Pamplona
19:30 CEST (UTC+2)	Torró 77'; Budimir 50'	Report		Stadium: El Sadar; Attendance: 19,830; Referee: Alejandro Muñiz Ruiz

=== Table ===
Pos	Team	Pld	W	D	L	GF	GA	GD	Pts	Qualification
1	Real Sociedad (Q)	4	3	0	1	7	3	+4	9	Qualified for the final
2	Osasuna (Q)	4	1	1	2	2	4	−2	4	Qualified for the final
3	Athletic Bilbao	4	1	1	2	3	5	−2	4	

Source: Soccerway

=== Final ===
21 July 2023	Real Sociedad	1–3	Osasuna	Irun
	Cho 25'		Catena 8', 38', 43'	Stadium: Stadium Gal; Referee: Ricardo De Burgos Bengoetxea

== 2023–24 ==
There were four eligible clubs and 12 fixtures between them in the 2023–24 La Liga campaign (the 2023–24 Copa del Rey quarter-finals ties involving Athletic Bilbao v Alavés and Osasuna v Real Sociedad are not included).

=== Relevant matches ===
19 August 2023 2/1	Osasuna	0–2	Athletic Bilbao	Pamplona
21:30 CEST (UTC+2)	D. García (yellow card) 59'; Ávila (red card) 90+4'	Report	I. Williams 11'; Guruzeta 20'; Sancet (red card) 47'	Stadium: El Sadar; Attendance: 20,704; Referee: José Luis Munuera Montero

22 September 2023 6/2	Alavés	0–2	Athletic Bilbao	Vitoria-Gasteiz
21:00 CEST (UTC+2)		Report	I. Williams 18'; Sancet 76'	Stadium: Mendizorrotza; Attendance: 19,421; Referee: Alejandro Muñiz Ruiz

30 September 2023 8/3	Real Sociedad	3–0	Athletic Bilbao	San Sebastián
21:00 CEST (UTC+2)	Le Normand 30'; Kubo 48'; Oyarzabal 66'	Report		Stadium: Reale Arena; Attendance: 38,229; Referee: Jesús Gil Manzano

1 October 2023 8/4	Alavés	0–2	Osasuna	Vitoria-Gasteiz
16:15 CEST (UTC+2)	Blanco (red card) 49'	Report	Arnaiz 36'; Budimir 90'	Stadium: Mendizorrotza; Attendance: 19,035; Referee: Jorge Figueroa Vázquez

2 December 2023 15/5	Osasuna	1–1	Real Sociedad	Pamplona
21:00 CET (UTC+1)	Gómez 2'	Report	Sadiq 41'	Stadium: El Sadar; Attendance: 20,859; Referee: Juan Luis Pulido Santana

3 January 2024 19/6	Real Sociedad	1–1	Alavés	San Sebastián
19:15 CET (UTC+1)	Remiro (red card) 36'; Zubimendi 90+6'	Report	Rioja 76' (pen.)	Stadium: Reale Arena; Attendance: 34,051; Referee: Víctor García Verdura

13 January 2024 20/7	Athletic Bilbao	2–1	Real Sociedad	Bilbao
18:30 CET (UTC+1)	Berenguer 30', 42'	Report	Oyarzabal 88'	Stadium: San Mamés; Attendance: 51,475; Referee: José Luis Munuera Montero

10 February 2024 24/8	Real Sociedad	0–1	Osasuna	San Sebastián
16:15 CET (UTC+1)		Report	Budimir 49'	Stadium: Reale Arena; Attendance: 32,905; Referee: Isidro Díaz de Mera Escuderos

4 March 2024 27/9	Osasuna	1–0	Alavés	Pamplona
21:00 CET (UTC+1)	Budimir 76'	Report		Stadium: El Sadar; Attendance: 17,215; Referee: Jorge Figueroa Vázquez

16 March 2024 29/10	Athletic Bilbao	2–0	Alavés	Bilbao
21:00 CET (UTC+1)	Guruzeta 32', 37'	Report	Rioja (penalty missed) 31'	Stadium: San Mamés; Attendance: 48,257; Referee: Alejandro Muñiz Ruiz

31 March 2024 30/11	Alavés	0–1	Real Sociedad	Vitoria-Gasteiz
18:30 CEST (UTC+2)		Report	Pacheco 59'	Stadium: Mendizorrotza; Attendance: 18,575; Referee: Francisco José Hernández Maeso

11 May 2024 35/12	Athletic Bilbao	2–2	Osasuna	Bilbao
21:00 CEST (UTC+2)	I. Williams 58'; Villalibre 90+6'	Report	Raúl García 40'; Rubén García 47'	Stadium: San Mamés; Attendance: 45,273; Referee: José María Sánchez Martínez

=== Table ===
Pos	Team	Pld	W	D	L	GF	GA	GD	Pts	Qualification
1	Athletic Bilbao	6	4	1	1	10	6	+4	13	Qualified for the final
2	Osasuna	6	3	2	1	7	5	+2	11	Qualified for the final
3	Real Sociedad	6	2	2	2	7	5	+2	8	
4	Alavés	6	0	1	5	1	9	−8	1	

Updated to match(es) played on unknown. Source: Soccerway

=== Final ===
3 August 2024	Athletic Bilbao	2–1	Osasuna	Barakaldo
20:30	Djaló 19'; I. Williams 65'		Rubén García 26'	Stadium: Estadio de Lasesarre; Attendance: 5,000; Referee: Olatz Rivera

== 2024–25 ==
There were four eligible clubs and 12 fixtures between them in the 2024–25 La Liga campaign – the 2024–25 Copa del Rey ties (round of 16 Athletic Bilbao v Osasuna, quarter-final Real Sociedad v Osasuna) are not included.

=== Relevant matches ===
28 August 2024 3/1	Real Sociedad	1–2	Alavés	San Sebastián
21:30 CEST (UTC+2)	Oyarzabal (red card) 29'; Méndez 32'	Report	Villalibre 45+5' (pen.); Martínez 77'	Stadium: Reale Arena; Attendance: 32,220; Referee: José María Sánchez Martínez

27 October 2024 11/2	Real Sociedad	0–2	Osasuna	San Sebastián
21:00		Report	Torró 23'; Budimir 34'	Stadium: Reale Arena; Attendance: 31,279; Referee: Juan Luis Pulido Santana

24 November 2024 14/3	Athletic Bilbao	1–0	Real Sociedad	Bilbao
21:00 CET (UTC+1)	Sancet 26'	Report		Stadium: San Mamés; Attendance: 50,719; Referee: Jesús Gil Manzano

8 December 2024 16/4	Osasuna	2–2	Alavés	Pamplona
21:00 CET (UTC+1)	Budimir 54'; R. García 61'	Report	K. García 1', 68'	Stadium: El Sadar; Attendance: 18,220; Referee: César Soto Grado

15 December 2024 17/5	Alavés	1–1	Athletic Bilbao	Vitoria-Gasteiz
16:15 CET (UTC+1)	Jordán 67'	Report	Gómez 10'	Stadium: Mendizorrotza; Attendance: 19,239; Referee: José María Sánchez Martínez

22 December 2024 18/6	Osasuna	1–2	Athletic Bilbao	Pamplona
18:30	Torró 25'	Report	Guruzeta 31'; Berenguer 74'	Stadium: El Sadar; Attendance: 22,030; Referee: Alejandro Quintero González

2 February 2025 22/7	Osasuna	2–1	Real Sociedad	Pamplona
18:30	Budimir 34', 74'	Report	Óskarsson 90+4'	Stadium: El Sadar; Attendance: 21,678; Referee: Miguel Ángel Ortiz Arias

30 March 2025 29/8	Athletic Bilbao	0–0	Osasuna	Bilbao
18:30		Report		Stadium: San Mamés; Attendance: 49,671; Referee: Guillermo Cuadra Fernández

23 April 2025 33/9	Alavés	1–0	Real Sociedad	Vitoria-Gasteiz
21:30 CEST (UTC+2)	Tenaglia 65'	Report		Stadium: Mendizorrotza; Attendance: 17,049; Referee: Mateo Busquets Ferrer

4 May 2025 34/10	Real Sociedad	0–0	Athletic Bilbao	San Sebastián
21:00 CEST (UTC+2)		Report		Stadium: Reale Arena; Attendance: 36,058; Referee: César Soto Grado

11 May 2025 35/11	Athletic Bilbao	1–0	Alavés	Bilbao
18:30 CEST (UTC+2)	Sánchez 71' (o.g.)	Report		Stadium: San Mamés; Attendance: 47,947; Referee: José Luis Munuera Montero

25 May 2025 38/12	Alavés	1–1	Osasuna	Vitoria-Gasteiz
20:00	Vicente 56' (pen.)	Report	Raúl García 88'	Stadium: Mendizorrotza; Attendance: 19,274; Referee: Guillermo Cuadra Fernández

=== Table ===
Pos	Team	Pld	W	D	L	GF	GA	GD	Pts	Qualification
1	Athletic Bilbao	6	3	3	0	5	2	+3	12	Qualified for the final
2	Osasuna	6	2	3	1	8	6	+2	9	Qualified for the final
3	Alavés	6	2	3	1	7	6	+1	9	
4	Real Sociedad	6	0	1	5	2	8	−6	1	

Updated to match(es) played on unknown. Source: Soccerway

=== Final ===
4 September 2025	Athletic Bilbao	0 – 1	Osasuna	Barakaldo
			Osambela 76'	Stadium: Estadio de Lasesarre; Referee: Gorka Etayo Herrera

== 2025–26 ==
There were four eligible clubs and 12 fixtures between them in the 2025–26 La Liga campaign – the 2025–26 Copa del Rey ties (round of 16 Real Sociedad v Osasuna, quarter-final Real Sociedad v Alavés, semi-final Athletic Bilbao v Real Sociedad) are not included.

=== Relevant matches ===
13 September 2025 4/1	Athletic Bilbao	0–1	Alavés	Bilbao
	Ruiz de Galarreta (yellow card) 19'; Paredes (yellow card) 53'; Sannadi (yellow card) 85'; Izeta (yellow card) 90+3'	Report	Mariano (yellow card) 30'; Tenaglia (yellow card) 49'; Berenguer 57' (o.g.); Ibáñez (yellow card) 90+2'	Stadium: San Mamés; Attendance: 49,136; Referee: José María Sánchez Martínez

1 November 2025 11/2	Real Sociedad	3–2	Athletic Bilbao	San Sebastián
18:30 CET (UTC+1)	Méndez 38'; Guedes 47'; Gorrotxategi (yellow card) 77', (goal) 90+2'; Aramburu (yellow card) 90+9'	Report	Guruzeta 42'; Ruiz de Galarreta (yellow card) 65'; Navarro 79'; Berchiche (yellow card) 90+6'; Sancet (yellow card) 90+9'	Stadium: Anoeta; Attendance: 37,685; Referee: José Luis Munuera Montero

22 November 2025 13/3	Osasuna	1–3	Real Sociedad	Osasuna
18:30 CET (UTC+1)	Catena 42', (yellow card) 90+1'; Arguibide (red card); Fernández (yellow card) 88'; Oroz (yellow card) 90'	Report	Méndez (yellow card) 30', (goal) 53'; Martín (yellow card) 54'; Guedes 59'; Barrenetxea 82'	Stadium: El Sadar; Attendance: 21,377; Referee: Mateo Busquets Ferrer

6 December 2025 15/4	Alavés	1–0	Real Sociedad	Vitoria-Gasteiz
16:15 CET (UTC+1)	Boyé 45+4'; Guevara (yellow card) 62'; Tenaglia (yellow card) 69'	Report	Gorrotxategi (yellow card) 29'; Aramburu (yellow card) 39'	Stadium: Mendizorrotza; Attendance: 18,132; Referee: Javier Alberola Rojas

20 December 2025 17/5	Osasuna	3–0	Alavés	Pamplona
18:30	García 90+3'; Budimir 72', 82' (pen.)	Report		Stadium: El Sadar; Attendance: 20,408; Referee: César Soto Grado

3 January 2026 19/6	Osasuna	1–1	Athletic Bilbao	Pamplona
	García 34'; Moncayola (yellow card) 67'; Catena (yellow card) 73'; Herrando (yellow card) 77'	Report	Paredes (yellow card) 9'; Boiro (yellow card) 53'; Guruzeta 71'; Berenguer (yellow card) 73'	Stadium: Estadio El Sadar; Attendance: 22,010; Referee: José Luis Munuera Montero

1 February 2026 22/7	Athletic Bilbao	1–1	Real Sociedad	Bilbao
	de Galarreta 88'	Report	Guedes 37'	Stadium: San Mamés; Attendance: 48,020; Referee: Guillermo Cuadra Fernández

15 March 2026 28/8	Real Sociedad	3–1	Osasuna	San Sebastián
21:00 CET (UTC+1)	Oyarzabal 24' (pen.); Guedes 28', 52'; Turrientes (yellow card) 59'; Óskarsson (yellow card) 78'; Zubeldia (yellow card) 82'	Report	Muñoz 77'	Stadium: Anoeta; Attendance: 30,856; Referee: Guillermo Cuadra Fernández

5 April 2026 30/9	Alavés	2–2	Osasuna	Vitoria-Gasteiz
21:00	Boyé 90+1' (pen.); Martínez 44'	Report	Osambela (red card) 90'; Budimir 80' (pen.); Rosier 4'	Stadium: Mendizorrotza; Attendance: 17,736; Referee: César Soto Grado

11 April 2026 31/10	Real Sociedad	3–3	Alavés	San Sebastián
14:00 CEST (UTC+2)	Sučić 14'; Sivera 27' (o.g.); Óskarsson 60'	Report	Ćaleta-Car 3' (o.g.); Diabaté 24'; Rebbach (yellow card) 59'; Pérez (yellow card) 66'; Boyé 90+7'; Suárez (yellow card) 90+10'	Stadium: Anoeta; Attendance: 31,024; Referee: Víctor García Verdura

21 April 2026 32/11	Athletic Bilbao	1–0	Osasuna	Bilbao
	Guruzeta 16'	Report		Stadium: San Mamés; Attendance: 47,500; Referee: Víctor García Verdura

3 May 2026 34/12	Alavés	2–4	Athletic Bilbao	Mendizorrotza Stadium
	Blanco 8'; Tenaglia 68'	Report	Navarro 46'; Sancet 74'; N Williams 83', 87'	Attendance: 19,125; Referee: Alejandro Quintero González

=== Table ===
Pos	Team	Pld	W	D	L	GF	GA	GD	Pts	Qualification
1	Real Sociedad	6	3	2	1	13	9	+4	11	Qualified for the final
2	Athletic Bilbao	6	2	2	2	9	8	+1	8	Qualified for the final
3	Alavés	6	2	2	2	9	12	−3	8	
4	Osasuna	6	1	2	3	8	10	−2	5	

Source: EHK

=== Final ===
2 October 2026 Final	Real Sociedad	0–1	Athletic Bilbao	San Sebastián
19:00 CEST (UTC+2)		Report	Sannadi 58'	Stadium: Anoeta; Attendance: 9,678; Referee: Luis Bestard

== See also ==
- Copa Euskal Herria (women's football)
- Supercopa de Catalunya
