= 2025–26 Athletic Bilbao season =

Athletic Bilbao
2025–26 season
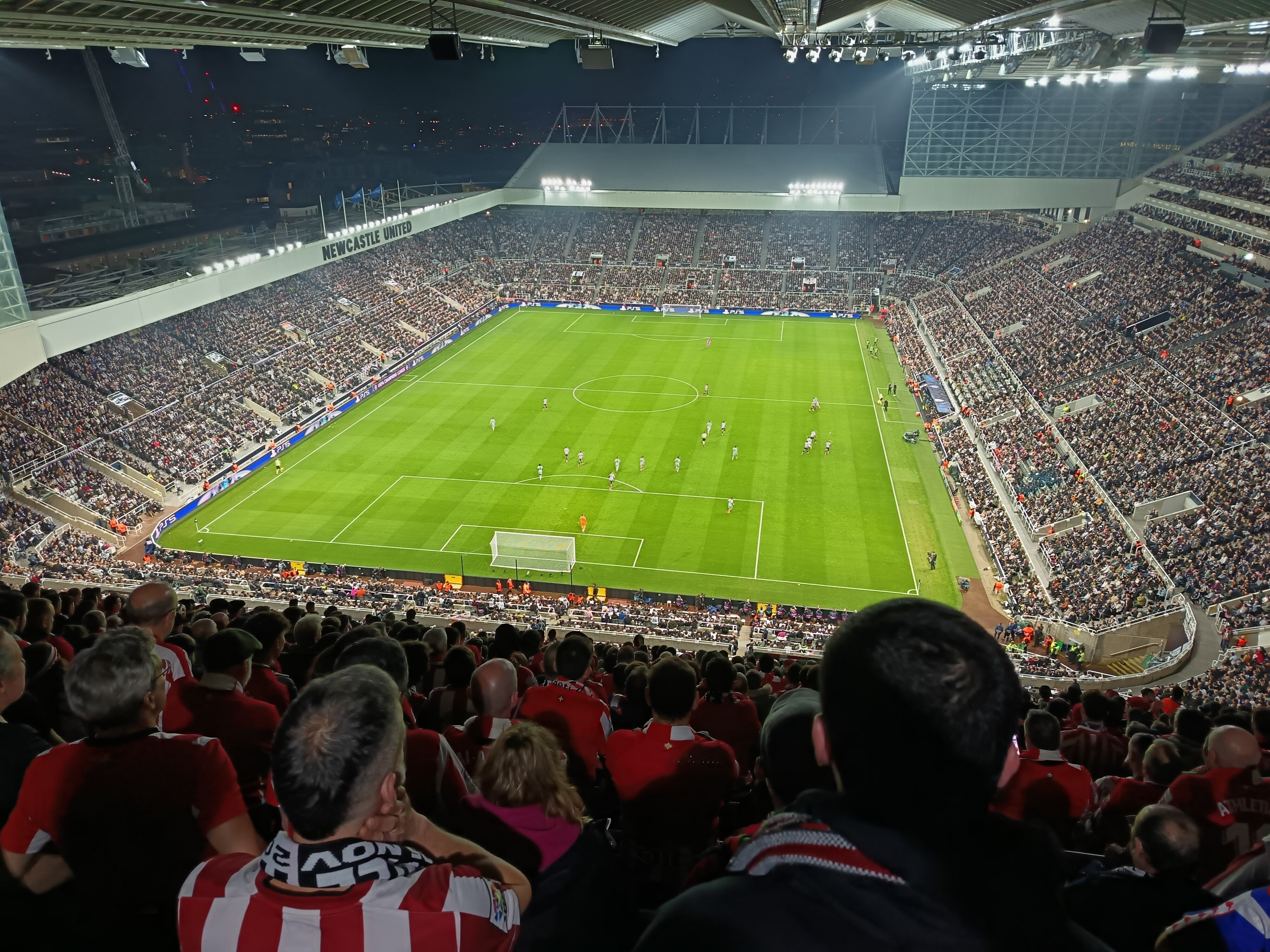
- Newcastle United vs Athletic at St James' Park, November 2025
- President: Jon Uriarte
- Head coach: Ernesto Valverde
- Stadium: San Mamés
- La Liga: 12th
- Copa del Rey: Semi-finals
- Supercopa de España: Semi-finals
- UEFA Champions League: League phase
- Top goalscorer: League: Gorka Guruzeta (10); All: Gorka Guruzeta (17)
- Average home league attendance: 47,575
| Home colours | Away colours | Third colours |

The 2025–26 season was the 127th season in the history of Athletic Bilbao, and the club's 95th consecutive season in La Liga. In addition to the domestic league, the club also participated in the Copa del Rey, the Supercopa de España, and the UEFA Champions League, qualifying for the two latter competitions after finishing fourth in the previous league campaign, and taking part in the primary continental tournament for the first time since the 2014–15 season.

== Players ==
As of 10 September 2025

Note: Flags indicate national team as defined under FIFA eligibility rules; some limited exceptions apply. Players may hold more than one non-FIFA nationality.

| No. | Pos. | Nation | Player |
|---|---|---|---|
| 1 | GK | ESP | Unai Simón |
| 2 | DF | ESP | Andoni Gorosabel |
| 3 | DF | ESP | Dani Vivian |
| 4 | DF | ESP | Aitor Paredes |
| 5 | DF | ESP | Yeray Álvarez (3rd captain) (Note: Yeray Álvarez was provisionally suspended from football activities in July 2025 for a doping offence and was officially given a 10-month suspension in September 2025.) |
| 6 | MF | ESP | Mikel Vesga |
| 7 | FW | ESP | Álex Berenguer |
| 8 | MF | ESP | Oihan Sancet |
| 9 | FW | GHA | Iñaki Williams (captain) |
| 10 | FW | ESP | Nico Williams |
| 11 | FW | ESP | Gorka Guruzeta |
| 12 | DF | ESP | Jesús Areso |
| 14 | DF | ESP | Aymeric Laporte |
| 15 | DF | ESP | Iñigo Lekue (vice-captain) |
| 16 | MF | ESP | Iñigo Ruiz de Galarreta |

| No. | Pos. | Nation | Player |
|---|---|---|---|
| 17 | DF | ESP | Yuri Berchiche (4th captain) |
| 18 | MF | ESP | Mikel Jauregizar |
| 19 | DF | ESP | Adama Boiro |
| 20 | MF | ESP | Unai Gómez |
| 21 | FW | MAR | Maroan Sannadi |
| 22 | FW | ESP | Nico Serrano |
| 23 | FW | ESP | Robert Navarro |
| 24 | MF | ESP | Beñat Prados |
| 25 | FW | ESP | Urko Izeta (Note: Urko Izeta was not registered for UEFA Champions League fixtures.) |
| 27 | GK | MEX | Álex Padilla |
| 29 | DF | ESP | Unai Egiluz |
| 30 | MF | ESP | Alejandro Rego |
| 31 | DF | ESP | Asier Hierro |
| 35 | DF | ESP | Ibon Sánchez |
| 44 | MF | ESP | Selton Sánchez |

== Transfers ==
=== In ===
| Pos. | Player | Transferred from | Fee | Date | Source |
|---|---|---|---|---|---|
| FW | (Spain) Javier Martón | (Spain) Albacete | Loan return | 30 June 2025 | |
| MF | (Spain) Unai Vencedor | (Spain) Racing Santander | Loan return | 30 June 2025 | |
| FW | (Spain) Malcom Adu Ares | (Spain) Zaragoza | Loan return | 30 June 2025 | |
| DF | (Spain) Hugo Rincón | (Spain) Mirandés | Loan return | 30 June 2025 | |
| DF | (Spain) Unai Egiluz | (Spain) Mirandés | Loan return | 30 June 2025 | |
| FW | (Spain) Urko Izeta | (Spain) Mirandés | Loan return | 30 June 2025 | |
| GK | (Mexico) Alex Padilla | (Mexico) Pumas UNAM | Loan return | 30 June 2025 | |
| MF | (Spain) Nico Serrano | (Spain) Sporting de Gijón | Loan return | 30 June 2025 | |
| FW | (Spain) Robert Navarro | (Spain) Mallorca | Free | 1 July 2025 | |
| DF | (Spain) Jesús Areso | (Spain) Osasuna | €12,000,000 | 22 July 2025 | |
| DF | (Spain) Aymeric Laporte | (Saudi Arabia) Al-Nassr | €10,000,000 | 11 September 2025 | |

=== Out ===
| Pos. | Player | Transferred from | Fee | Date | Source |
|---|---|---|---|---|---|
| DF | (Spain) Unai Nuñez | (Spain) Celta de Vigo | End of loan | 30 June 2025 | |
| DF | (Spain) Óscar de Marcos | Retired | N/A | 30 June 2025 | |
| GK | (Spain) Beñat Gerenabarrena | (Spain) Castellón | Loan | 1 July 2025 | |
| GK | (Spain) Julen Agirrezabala | (Spain) Valencia | Loan | 11 July 2025 | |
| FW | (Spain) Javier Martón | (Spain) Eibar | Released | 16 July 2025 | |
| FW | (Spain) Iker Varela | (Spain) Mirandés | Loan | 22 July 2025 | |
| FW | (Guinea-Bissau) Álvaro Djaló | (Qatar) Al Gharafa | Loan | 28 July 2025 | |
| DF | (Spain) Hugo Rincón | (Spain) Girona | Loan | 29 July 2025 | |
| FW | (Spain) Aingeru Olabarrieta | (Spain) Andorra | Loan | 9 August 2025 | |
| MF | (Spain) Peio Canales | (Spain) Racing de Santander | Loan | 15 August 2025 | |
| FW | (Spain) Malcom Adu Ares | (Spain) Eibar | Released | 17 August 2025 | |
| MF | (Spain) Unai Vencedor | (Spain) Levante UD | Loan | 2 September 2025 | |

== Friendlies ==
| 19 July 2025 | Athletic Bilbao | 1–0 | Ponferradina | Amorebieta |
| 20:00 | Sancet 36' | Report | | Stadium: Urritxe |

| 22 July 2025 | Alavés | 1–0 | Athletic Bilbao | Laguardia |
| 19:00 | Diallo 46' | Report | | Stadium: Estadio El Prao-Óscar de Marcos |

| 26 July 2025 | PSV | 2–1 | Athletic Bilbao | Eindhoven |
| 17:30 | Pléa 25'; Prados 54' (o.g.) | 1 2 | I. Williams 15' | Stadium: Philips Stadion; Referee: Allard Lindhout |

| 30 July 2025 | Racing Santander | 1–0 | Athletic Bilbao | Muriedas |
| 19:00 | Salinas 56'; Camara 90+3' | Report | Vesga 90+5' | Stadium: La Maruca |

| 4 August 2025 | Liverpool | 4–1 | Athletic Bilbao | Liverpool |
| 17:00 | Ngumoha 2'; Núñez 5'; Doak 42'; Elliott 58' | 1 2 | Guruzeta 76' | Stadium: Anfield; Attendance: 59,774; Referee: Robert Jones |

| 4 August 2025 | Liverpool | 3–2 | Athletic Bilbao | Liverpool |
| 20:00 | Salah 14'; Gakpo 55', 70' | 1 2 | Sancet 29'; Gakpo 64' (o.g.) | Stadium: Anfield; Attendance: 59,774; Referee: Darren England |

| 9 August 2025 Emirates Cup | Arsenal | 3–0 | Athletic Bilbao | London |
| 17:00 | Gyökeres 35'; Saka 37'; Havertz 82' | 1 2 | | Stadium: Emirates Stadium; Attendance: 60,000; Referee: Robert Jones |

| 4 September 2025 EH Txapela | Athletic Bilbao | 0–1 | Osasuna | Barakaldo |
| 20:30 | | Report | Osambela 76' | Stadium: Lasesarre; Referee: Gorka Etayo |

== Competitions ==
=== La Liga ===
==== League table ====
| Pos | Team | Pld | W | D | L | GF | GA | GD | Pts | Qualification or relegation |
|---|---|---|---|---|---|---|---|---|---|---|
| 10 | Real Sociedad | 38 | 11 | 13 | 14 | 59 | 61 | −2 | 46 (Note: Tied on head-to-head points and goal difference. Real Sociedad placed ahead of Espanyol on overall goal difference.) | Qualification for the Europa League league phase (Note: Real Sociedad qualified for the Europa League league phase as the 2025–26 Copa del Rey winners.) |
| 11 | Espanyol | 38 | 12 | 10 | 16 | 43 | 55 | −12 | 46 | |
| 12 | Athletic Bilbao | 38 | 13 | 6 | 19 | 43 | 58 | −15 | 45 | |
| 13 | Sevilla | 38 | 12 | 7 | 19 | 46 | 60 | −14 | 43 (Note: Head-to-head points: Sevilla 6, Alavés 5, Elche 3.) | |
| 14 | Alavés | 38 | 11 | 10 | 17 | 44 | 56 | −12 | 43 | |

Source: LaLiga EA Sports
Rules for classification: 1) Points; 2) Head-to-head points; 3) Head-to-head goal difference; 4) Goal difference; 5) Goals scored; 6) Fair-play points
(Note: Head-to-head record is used only after all the matches between the teams in question have been played)

==== Matches ====
The league schedule was released on 13 July 2025.

Win Draw Loss Fixtures

| 17 August 2025 1 | Athletic Bilbao | 3–2 | Sevilla | Bilbao |
| 19:30 CEST (UTC+2) | N. Williams 36' (pen.); Sannadi 43'; Navarro 81' | Report | Castrín (yellow card) 6'; Agoumé (yellow card) 37', (goal) 72'; Lukébakio 60' | Stadium: San Mamés; Attendance: 49,134; Referee: Francisco José Hernández Maeso |

| 25 August 2025 2 | Athletic Bilbao | 1–0 | Rayo Vallecano | Bilbao |
| | Sancet 66' (pen.) | Report | Rațiu (yellow card) 22'; López (yellow card) 23'; García (yellow card) 69'; Chavarría (yellow card) 79' | Stadium: San Mamés; Attendance: 48,073; Referee: Juan Martínez Munuera |

| 31 August 2025 3 | Real Betis | 1–2 | Athletic Bilbao | Seville |
| | Bakambu 90+7'; Firpo (yellow card) 90+11' | Report | Prados (yellow card) 45+1'; Bartra 60' (o.g.); Vivian (yellow card) 72'; Paredes 85'; Sannadi (yellow card) 90+8'; Padilla (red card) 90+9' | Stadium: La Cartuja; Attendance: 65,222; Referee: Isidro Díaz de Mera Escuderos |

| 13 September 2025 4 | Athletic Bilbao | 0–1 | Alavés | Bilbao |
| | Ruiz de Galarreta (yellow card) 19'; Paredes (yellow card) 53'; Sannadi (yellow card) 85'; Izeta (yellow card) 90+3' | Report | Mariano (yellow card) 30'; Tenaglia (yellow card) 49'; Berenguer 57' (o.g.); Ibáñez (yellow card) 90+2' | Stadium: San Mamés; Attendance: 49,136; Referee: José María Sánchez Martínez |

| 20 September 2025 5 | Valencia | 2–0 | Athletic Bilbao | Valencia |
| | Gayà (yellow card) 59'; Santamaria 73'; Duro 90+3' | Report | Navarro (yellow card) 20'; Vivian (red card) 61' | Stadium: Mestalla; Attendance: 46,004 |

| 23 September 2025 6 | Athletic Bilbao | 1–1 | Girona | Bilbao |
| | Jauregizar 48' | Report | Ounahi 9' (yellow card) 68'; Martín (yellow card) 90+1' | Stadium: San Mamés; Attendance: 45,739; Referee: José Luis Munuera Montero |

| 27 September 2025 7 | Villarreal | 1–0 | Athletic Bilbao | Via-real |
| 21:00 (UTC+02:00) | Moleiro 77'; Buchanan (yellow card) 83'; Parejo (yellow card) 90+2' | Report | | Stadium: Estadio de la Cerámica; Attendance: 18,908; Referee: Miguel Sesma Espinosa |

| 4 October 2025 8 | Athletic Bilbao | 2–1 | Mallorca | Bilbao |
| | N. Williams 9' (pen.); de Galarreta (yellow card) 36'; Laporte (yellow card) 49'; Rego 82'; Areso (yellow card) 90'; Vivian (yellow card) 90+3' | Report | Darder (yellow card) 45+2'; Muriqi (yellow card) 75'; Samú Costa 77'; Raíllo (yellow card) 89'; Sánchez (yellow card) 90+2' (red card) 90+2'; Román (yellow card) 90+5' | Stadium: San Mamés; Attendance: 47,098; Referee: Alejandro Quintero González |

| 19 October 2025 9 | Elche | 0–0 | Athletic Bilbao | Elche |
| 14:00 CEST | Chust (yellow card) 29'; Valera (yellow card) 44' | Report | de Galarreta (yellow card) 61'; Jauregizar (yellow card) 83'; Vivian (yellow card) 90+4' | Stadium: Estadio Martínez Valero; Attendance: 29,043; Referee: José Luis Guzmán Mansilla |

| 25 October 2025 10 | Athletic Bilbao | 0–1 | Getafe | Bilbao |
| | Guruzeta (yellow card) 32'; Lekue (red card) 90+3' | Report | Mayoral 75'; Duarte (yellow card) 88'; Rico (yellow card) 90+5'; Martín (yellow card) 90+5' | Stadium: San Mamés; Attendance: 47,749; Referee: Isidro Díaz de Mera Escuderos |

| 1 November 2025 11 | Real Sociedad | 3–2 | Athletic Bilbao | San Sebastián |
| 18:30 CET (UTC+1) | Méndez 38'; Guedes 47'; Gorrotxategi (yellow card) 77' (goal) 90+2'; Aramburu (yellow card) 90+9' | Report | Guruzeta 42'; de Galarreta (yellow card) 65'; Navarro 79'; Berchiche (yellow card) 90+6'; Sancet (yellow card) 90+9' | Stadium: Anoeta Stadium; Attendance: 37,685; Referee: José Luis Munuera Montero |

| 9 November 2025 12 | Athletic Bilbao | 1–0 | Oviedo | Bilbao |
| | N. Williams 25'; de Galarreta (yellow card) 47' | Report | Aarón (yellow card) 57' | Stadium: San Mamés; Attendance: 47,209; Referee: César Soto Grado |

| 22 November 2025 13 | Barcelona | 4–0 | Athletic Bilbao | Barcelona |
| 16:15 CET (UTC+1) | Lewandowski 4'; Torres 45+3', 90'; Fermín 48' | Report | Ruiz de Galarreta (yellow card) 43'; Sancet (red card) 54'; Gorosabel (yellow card) 73' | Stadium: Camp Nou; Attendance: 45,157; Referee: José María Sánchez Martínez |

| 29 November 2025 14 | Levante UD | 0–2 | Athletic Bilbao | Valencia |

| 3 December 2025 15 | Athletic Bilbao | 0–3 | Real Madrid | Bilbao |
| 19:00 UTC+1 | | Report | Mbappé 7', 59'; Camavinga 42' | Stadium: San Mamés; Attendance: 51,313; Referee: Jesús Gil Manzano |
Note: The match date was rescheduled due to both clubs' involvement in the 2026 Supercopa de España.

| 6 December 2025 16 | Athletic Bilbao | 1–0 | Atlético Madrid | Bilbao |
| 21:00 CET (UTC+1) | Jauregizar (yellow card) 14'; Ruiz de Galarreta (yellow card) 20'; Laporte (yellow card) 28'; Berenguer 85' | Report | Gallagher (yellow card) 12'; Koke (yellow card) 90+4' | Stadium: San Mamés; Attendance: 48,904; Referee: Alejandro Muñiz Ruiz |

| 14 December 2025 17 | Celta Vigo | 2–0 | Athletic Bilbao | Vigo |
| 16:15 UTC+1 | Jutglà (yellow card) 44'; Swedberg 48'; El-Abdellaoui 55'; Aspas (yellow card) 77'; Iglesias (yellow card) 90+6' | Report | N. Williams (penalty missed) 65; I.Williams (yellow card) 66'; Vivian (yellow card) 87' | Stadium: Abanca-Balaídos; Attendance: 20,505; Referee: Alejandro José Hernández Hernández |

| 22 December 2025 18 | Athletic Bilbao | 1–2 | Espanyol | Bilbao |
| | de Galarreta (yellow card) 28'; Williams (yellow card) 33'; Berenguer 35'; Gorosabel (yellow card) 45+1'; Rego (yellow card) 80' | Report | Romero 44'; Milla 52'; González (yellow card) 77'; Riedel (yellow card) 86' | Stadium: San Mamés; Attendance: 47,856; Referee: Mateo Busquets Ferrer |

| 3 January 2026 19 | Osasuna | 1–1 | Athletic Bilbao | Pamplona |
| | García 34'; Moncayola (yellow card) 67'; Catena (yellow card) 73'; Herrando (yellow card) 77' | Report | Paredes (yellow card) 9'; Boiro (yellow card) 53'; Guruzeta 71'; Berenguer (yellow card) 73' | Stadium: Estadio El Sadar; Attendance: 22,010; Referee: José Luis Munuera Montero |

| 17 January 2026 20 | RCD Mallorca | 3–2 | Athletic Bilbao | Palma |
| | Muriqi 5', 42', 69' (.pen); Kumbulla (yellow card) 18' | Report | Gómez 8'; Vivian (yellow card) 40'; N. Williams 45'; Areso (yellow card) 45+5'; Guruzeta (yellow card) 45+6' (yellow-red card) 70'; Lekue (red card) 72'; Sancet (yellow card) 73' | Stadium: Estadi Mallorca Son Moix; Attendance: 14,284; Referee: José Luis Guzmán Mansilla |

| 24 January 2026 21 | Sevilla | 2–1 | Athletic Bilbao | Seville |
| 18:30 | Fernández 42'; Adams 56' (pen.); Gudelj (yellow card) 62'; Jordán (yellow card) 86' | Report | Ruiz de Galarreta (yellow card) 21'; Navarro 40' | Stadium: Ramón Sánchez-Pizjuán Stadium; Attendance: 34,642; Referee: Francisco José Hernández Maeso |

| 1 February 2026 22 | Athletic Bilbao | 1–1 | Real Sociedad |
| | de Galarreta 88' | Report | Guedes 37' | Attendance: 48,020; Referee: Guillermo Cuadra Fernández |

| 8 February 2026 23 | Athletic Bilbao | 4–2 | Levante UD |
| | Guruzeta 29', 34'; Serrano 86'; Navarro 99' | Report | Elgezabal 81'; Olasagasti 94' | Attendance: 46,487; Referee: Alejandro Muñiz Ruiz |

| 15 February 2026 24 | Real Oviedo | 1–2 | Athletic Bilbao |
| | Ilyas Chaira 30' | Report | Jauregizar 58'; Sancet 71' (.pen) | Attendance: 25,255; Referee: Mateo Busquets Ferrer |

| 20 February 2026 25 | Athletic Bilbao | 2–1 | Elche CF | Estadio San Mamés |
| | Guruzeta 64', 89' (pen.) | Report | Silva 69' (pen.) | Attendance: 46,654; Referee: Alejandro José Hernández Hernández |

| 28 February 2026 26 | Rayo Vallecano | 1–1 | Athletic Bilbao |
| | de Frutos 35' | Report | I Williams 47' |

| 7 March 2026 27 | Athletic Bilbao | 0–1 | Barcelona | Bilbao |
| 21:00 CET (UTC+1) | Rego (yellow card) 50'; Vivian (yellow card) 90+3' | Report | Cubarsí (yellow card) 57'; Yamal 68' | Stadium: San Mamés; Attendance: 50,629; Referee: José Luis Munuera Montero |

| 14 March 2026 28 | Girona FC | 3–0 | Athletic Bilbao |
| | Rincón 4'; Ounahi 77'; Echeverri 92' | Report | | Attendance: 8,811; Referee: Iosu Galech Apezteguía |

| 22 March 2026 29 | Athletic Bilbao | 2–1 | Real Betis | Estadio San Mamés |
| | Vivian 25'; Sancet 45' | Report | Fornals 75' | Attendance: 47,723; Referee: Alejandro Muñiz Ruiz |

| 5 April 2026 30 | Getafe CF | 2–0 | Athletic Bilbao | Coliseum |
| | Vázquez 14'; Satriano 90' | Report | | Attendance: 7,749; Referee: Juan Martínez Munuera |

| 12 April 2026 31 | Athletic Bilbao | 1–2 | Villarreal CF | San Mamés |
| | Guruzeta 84' | Report | Cardona 26'; Alfon 45+5' | Attendance: 42,891; Referee: José Luis Guzmán Mansilla |

| 21 April 2026 32 | Athletic Bilbao | 1–0 | CA Osasuna | Bilbao |
| | Guruzeta 16' | | | Stadium: San Mamés; Attendance: 47,500 |

| 25 April 2026 33 | Atlético Madrid | 3–2 | Athletic Bilbao | Madrid |
| 21:00 CEST (UTC+2) | Griezmann 49'; Sørloth 54', 90+3' | Report | Paredes 23'; Guruzeta 90+7' | Stadium: Riyadh Air Metropolitano; Attendance: 56,598; Referee: Jesús Gil Manzano |

| 3 May 2026 34 | Deportivo Alavés | 2–4 | Athletic Bilbao | Mendizorrotza Stadium |
| | Blanco 8'; Tenaglia 68' | Report | Navarro 46'; Sancet 74'; N Williams 83', 87' | Attendance: 19,125; Referee: Alejandro Quintero González |

| 10 May 2026 35 | Athletic Bilbao | 0–1 | Valencia CF | San Mamés |
| | | Report | Sadiq 72' | Attendance: 46,880; Referee: Miguel Ortiz Arias |

| 13 May 2026 36 | RCD Espanyol | 2–0 | Athletic Bilbao | RCDE Stadium |
| | Milla 69'; García 90+2' | Report | | Attendance: 29,943; Referee: Francisco Hernández Maeso |

| 17 May 2026 37 | Athletic Bilbao | 1–1 | RC Celta de Vigo | San Mamés |
| | I Williams 52' | Report | Swedberg 4' | Referee: Isidro Díaz de Mera |

| 23 May 2026 38 | Real Madrid CF | 4–2 | Athletic Bilbao | Bernabéu |
| | G. García 12'; Bellingham 41'; Mbappé 51'; Brahim 88' | | Guruzeta 45+1'; Izeta 90+1' | Attendance: 70,398; Referee: Juan Martínez Munuera |

=== Copa del Rey ===
| 18 December 2025 Round of 32 | Ourense CF | 0–1 (a.e.t.) | Athletic Bilbao | Ourense |
| | David Muñoz (yellow card) 45'; Coto (yellow card) 90+4'; Pérez (yellow card) 105+1' | Report | Vesga (yellow card) 44'; Rego (yellow card) 79'; Jauregizar 105+1' (yellow card) 107' | Stadium: O Couto; Referee: José Luis Munuera Montero |

| 13 January 2026 Round of 16 | Cultural Leonesa | 3–4 (a.e.t.) | Athletic Bilbao | León |
| 21:00 | Calero 16', 27'; Sobrino 41' (pen.) | Report | Guruzeta 26', 38'; Sancet 45+3' (pen.); Gómez 104' (pen.) | Stadium: Reino de León; Attendance: 11,004; Referee: Alejandro Hernández Hernández |

| 4 February 2026 Quarter-finals | Valencia | 1–2 | Athletic Bilbao | Valencia |
| 21:00 | Sadiq 35' | Report | Sadiq 26' (o.g.); I. Williams 90+6' | Stadium: Mestalla; Attendance: 46,931; Referee: Victor García Verdura |

| 11 February 2026 Semi-finals First Leg | Athletic Bilbao | 0–1 | Real Sociedad | Bilbao |
| 21:00 | | Report | Turrientes 62' | Stadium: San Mamés; Attendance: 51,281; Referee: José María Sánchez Martínez |

| 4 March 2026 Semi-finals Second Leg | Real Sociedad | 1–0 | Athletic Bilbao | San Sebastián |
| 21:00 | Oyarzabal 87' (pen.) | Report | | Stadium: Anoeta; Attendance: 38,738; Referee: César Soto Grado |

=== Supercopa de España ===
| 7 January 2026 Semi-final | Barcelona | 5–0 | Athletic Bilbao | Jeddah, Saudi Arabia |
| 22:00 SAST (UTC+3) | Torres 22'; Fermín 30'; Bardghji 34'; Raphinha 38', 52' | | | Stadium: King Abdullah Sports City |

=== UEFA Champions League ===
==== League phase ====
The draw for the league phase was held on 28 August 2025.

| Pos | Team | Pld | W | D | L | GF | GA | GD | Pts |
|---|---|---|---|---|---|---|---|---|---|
| 27 | (Royal Belgian Football Association) Union Saint-Gilloise | 8 | 3 | 0 | 5 | 8 | 17 | −9 | 9 |
| 28 | (Royal Dutch Football Association) PSV Eindhoven | 8 | 2 | 2 | 4 | 16 | 16 | 0 | 8 |
| 29 | (Royal Spanish Football Federation) Athletic Bilbao | 8 | 2 | 2 | 4 | 9 | 14 | −5 | 8 |
| 30 | (Italian Football Federation) Napoli | 8 | 2 | 2 | 4 | 9 | 15 | −6 | 8 |
| 31 | (Danish Football Association) Copenhagen | 8 | 2 | 2 | 4 | 12 | 21 | −9 | 8 |

Source: UEFA
Rules for classification: League phase tiebreakers

==== Matches ====
| 16 September 2025 | Athletic Bilbao (Spain) | 0–2 | (England) Arsenal | Bilbao |
| 18:45 | | Report | Martinelli 72'; Trossard 87' | Stadium: San Mamés; Attendance: 51,059; Referee: Donatas Rumšas (Lithuania) |

| 1 October 2025 | Borussia Dortmund (Germany) | 4–1 | (Spain) Athletic Bilbao | Dortmund |
| 21:00 | Svensson 28'; Chukwuemeka 50'; Guirassy 82'; Brandt 90+1' | Report | Guruzeta 61' | Stadium: Westfalenstadion; Attendance: 81,365; Referee: Szymon Marciniak (Poland) |

| 22 October 2025 | Athletic Bilbao (Spain) | 3–1 | (Azerbaijan) Qarabağ | Bilbao |
| 18:45 | Guruzeta 40', 88'; Navarro 70' | Report | Andrade 1' | Stadium: San Mamés; Attendance: 50,471; Referee: Igor Pajač (Croatia) |

| 5 November 2025 | Newcastle United (England) | 2–0 | (Spain) Athletic Bilbao | Newcastle upon Tyne |
| 21:00 (20:00 UTC+0) | Burn 11'; Joelinton 49' | Report | | Stadium: St James' Park; Attendance: 51,923; Referee: Ivan Kružliak (Slovakia) |

| 25 November 2025 | Slavia Prague (Czech Republic) | 0–0 | (Spain) Athletic Bilbao | Prague |
| 21:00 | | Report | | Stadium: Fortuna Arena; Attendance: 19,169; Referee: Donatas Rumšas (Lithuania) |

| 10 December 2025 | Athletic Bilbao (Spain) | 0–0 | (France) Paris Saint-Germain | Bilbao |
| 21:00 | | Report | | Stadium: San Mamés; Attendance: 51,772; Referee: Daniel Siebert (Germany) |

| 21 January 2026 | Atalanta (Italy) | 2–3 | (Spain) Athletic Bilbao | Bergamo |
| 21:00 | Scamacca 16'; Krstović 88' | Report | Guruzeta 58'; Serrano 70'; Navarro 74' | Stadium: Stadio Atleti Azzurri d'Italia; Attendance: 21,462; Referee: Danny Makkelie (Netherlands) |

| 28 January 2026 | Athletic Bilbao (Spain) | 2–3 | (Portugal) Sporting CP | Bilbao |
| 21:00 CET (UTC+1) | Sancet 3'; Guruzeta 28' | Report | Diomande 12'; Trincão 62'; Alisson 90+4' | Stadium: San Mamés; Attendance: 52,065; Referee: Felix Zwayer (Germany) |

== Statistics ==
=== Appearances and goals ===
| No. | Pos | Nat | Player | Total | | La Liga | | Copa del Rey | | Supercopa de España | | Champions League | |
| No. | Pos | Nat | Player | Apps | Goals | Apps | Goals | Apps | Goals | Apps | Goals | Apps | Goals |
Goalkeepers
| 1 | GK | (Spain) ESP | Unai Simón | 46 | 0 | 37 | 0 | 0 | 0 | 1 | 0 | 8 | 0 |
| 27 | GK | (Mexico) MEX | Alex Padilla | 6 | 0 | 1 | 0 | 5 | 0 | 0 | 0 | 0 | 0 |
Defenders
| 2 | DF | (Spain) ESP | Andoni Gorosabel | 34 | 0 | 15+9 | 0 | 3 | 0 | 0 | 0 | 5+2 | 0 |
| 3 | DF | (Spain) ESP | Daniel Vivian | 41 | 1 | 28+3 | 1 | 3 | 0 | 1 | 0 | 6 | 0 |
| 4 | DF | (Spain) ESP | Aitor Paredes | 30 | 2 | 18+1 | 2 | 2+1 | 0 | 1 | 0 | 7 | 0 |
| 5 | DF | (Spain) ESP | Yeray Álvarez | 7 | 0 | 6+1 | 0 | 0 | 0 | 0 | 0 | 0 | 0 |
| 12 | DF | (Spain) ESP | Jesús Areso | 35 | 0 | 14+12 | 0 | 0+3 | 0 | 1 | 0 | 3+2 | 0 |
| 14 | DF | (Spain) ESP | Aymeric Laporte | 30 | 0 | 24+1 | 0 | 3 | 0 | 0 | 0 | 1+1 | 0 |
| 15 | DF | (Spain) ESP | Iñigo Lekue | 19 | 0 | 8+3 | 0 | 4 | 0 | 0+1 | 0 | 2+1 | 0 |
| 17 | DF | (Spain) ESP | Yuri Berchiche | 39 | 0 | 31+1 | 0 | 1+2 | 0 | 0 | 0 | 3+1 | 0 |
| 19 | DF | (Spain) ESP | Adama Boiro | 24 | 0 | 8+6 | 0 | 2+1 | 0 | 1 | 0 | 6 | 0 |
| 47 | DF | (Spain) ESP | Iker Monreal | 2 | 0 | 0 | 0 | 2 | 0 | 0 | 0 | 0 | 0 |
Midfielders
| 6 | MF | (Spain) ESP | Mikel Vesga | 33 | 0 | 1+22 | 0 | 2+2 | 0 | 0 | 0 | 2+4 | 0 |
| 8 | MF | (Spain) ESP | Oihan Sancet | 38 | 6 | 22+6 | 4 | 3 | 1 | 1 | 0 | 5+1 | 1 |
| 16 | MF | (Spain) ESP | Iñigo Ruiz de Galarreta | 46 | 1 | 30+4 | 1 | 1+3 | 0 | 0+1 | 0 | 3+4 | 0 |
| 20 | MF | (Spain) ESP | Unai Gómez | 37 | 2 | 12+14 | 1 | 1+2 | 1 | 0+1 | 0 | 4+3 | 0 |
| 18 | MF | (Spain) ESP | Mikel Jauregizar | 49 | 3 | 34+2 | 2 | 4+1 | 1 | 1 | 0 | 6+1 | 0 |
| 24 | MF | (Spain) ESP | Beñat Prados | 2 | 0 | 1+1 | 0 | 0 | 0 | 0 | 0 | 0 | 0 |
| 30 | MF | (Spain) ESP | Alejandro Rego | 41 | 1 | 11+18 | 1 | 3 | 0 | 1 | 0 | 6+2 | 0 |
| 44 | MF | (Spain) ESP | Selton Sánchez | 13 | 0 | 2+5 | 0 | 1+1 | 0 | 0+1 | 0 | 0+3 | 0 |
| 35 | MF | (Spain) ESP | Ibon Sánchez | 1 | 0 | 0 | 0 | 0 | 0 | 0 | 0 | 0+1 | 0 |
| 49 | MF | (Spain) ESP | Eder García | 2 | 0 | 0+2 | 0 | 0 | 0 | 0 | 0 | 0 | 0 |
Forwards
| 7 | FW | (Spain) ESP | Álex Berenguer | 40 | 2 | 25+6 | 2 | 1+1 | 0 | 1 | 0 | 4+2 | 0 |
| 22 | FW | (Spain) ESP | Nico Serrano | 24 | 2 | 4+12 | 1 | 1+2 | 0 | 0 | 0 | 0+5 | 1 |
| 9 | FW | (Ghana) GHA | Iñaki Williams | 39 | 4 | 25+5 | 3 | 4+1 | 1 | 1 | 0 | 3 | 0 |
| 10 | FW | (Spain) ESP | Nico Williams | 32 | 6 | 20+5 | 6 | 1+3 | 0 | 0 | 0 | 2+1 | 0 |
| 23 | FW | (Spain) ESP | Robert Navarro | 44 | 8 | 10+22 | 6 | 2+2 | 0 | 1 | 0 | 6+1 | 2 |
| 11 | FW | (Spain) ESP | Gorka Guruzeta | 48 | 17 | 28+7 | 10 | 4+1 | 2 | 0+1 | 0 | 5+2 | 5 |
| 21 | FW | (Morocco) MAR | Maroan Sannadi | 11 | 1 | 2+8 | 1 | 0 | 0 | 0 | 0 | 1 | 0 |
| 25 | FW | (Spain) ESP | Urko Izeta | 16 | 1 | 1+12 | 1 | 2+1 | 0 | 0 | 0 | 0 | 0 |
| 31 | FW | (Spain) ESP | Asier Hierro | 4 | 0 | 0+1 | 0 | 0 | 0 | 0 | 0 | 0+3 | 0 |
Players who have made an appearance this season but have left the club
