= Alejandro Rego =

Spanish footballer (born 2003)

Personal information
- Full name: Alejandro Rego Mora
- Date of birth: 11 June 2003 (age 23)
- Place of birth: Bilbao, Spain
- Height: 1.92 m (6 ft 4 in)
- Position: Midfielder

Team information
- Current team: Athletic Bilbao
- Number: 20

Youth career
- 2011–2014: Indautxu
- 2014–2017: Santutxu
- 2017–2021: Athletic Bilbao

Senior career*
| Years | Team | Apps | (Gls) |
| 2021–2022 | Basconia | 35 | (3) |
| 2022– | Bilbao Athletic | 86 | (5) |
| 2025– | Athletic Bilbao | 32 | (1) |
- * Club domestic league appearances and goals as of 25 October 2026

Alejandro Rego Mora (born 11 June 2003) is a Spanish footballer who plays as a midfielder for Athletic Bilbao.

== Career ==
Born in Bilbao, Biscay, Basque Country, Rego played for SD Indautxu and Santutxu FC before joining Athletic Bilbao's Lezama youth academy in 2017, aged 14. He made his senior debut with farm team CD Basconia in the 2021–22 season, in the Tercera División RFEF.

Promoted to the reserves ahead of the 2022–23 campaign, Rego renewed his contract for two further years on 19 December 2023. After impressing during the 2025 pre-season with the first team, he made his professional – and La Liga – debut on 17 August of that year, coming on as a late substitute for goalscorer Nico Williams in a 3–2 home win over Sevilla FC.

== Career statistics ==
As of match played 25 October 2026

Appearances and goals by club, season and competition
| Club | Season | League | | | Cup | | Europe | | Other | | Total | |
| Club | Season | Division | Apps | Goals | Apps | Goals | Apps | Goals | Apps | Goals | Apps | Goals |
|---|---|---|---|---|---|---|---|---|---|---|---|---|
| Basconia | 2021–22 | Tercera Federación | 35 | 3 | — | | — | | 1 (Note: 2022 Segunda División RFEF play-offs) | 0 | 36 | 3 |
| Bilbao Athletic | 2022–23 | Primera Federación | 30 | 1 | — | | — | | — | | 30 | 1 |
| Bilbao Athletic | 2023–24 | Segunda Federación | 23 | 1 | — | | — | | — | | 23 | 1 |
| Bilbao Athletic | 2024–25 | Primera Federación | 33 | 3 | — | | — | | — | | 33 | 3 |
| Bilbao Athletic | Total | | 86 | 5 | — | | — | | — | | 86 | 5 |
| Athletic Bilbao | 2025–26 | La Liga | 27 | 1 | 3 | 0 | 8 (Note: Appearances in UEFA Champions League) | 0 | 1 (Note: Appearance in Supercopa de España) | 0 | 38 | 1 |
| Athletic Bilbao | 2026–27 | La Liga | 3 | 0 | 0 | 0 | — | | — | | 3 | 0 |
| Athletic Bilbao | Total | | 30 | 1 | 3 | 0 | 8 | 0 | 1 | 0 | 41 | 1 |
| Career total | | | 151 | 9 | 3 | 0 | 8 | 0 | 2 | 0 | 163 | 9 |

== Honours ==
Bilbao Athletic

- Segunda Federación (Group 2): 2023–24
