= Ibon Sánchez =

Spanish footballer (born 2004)

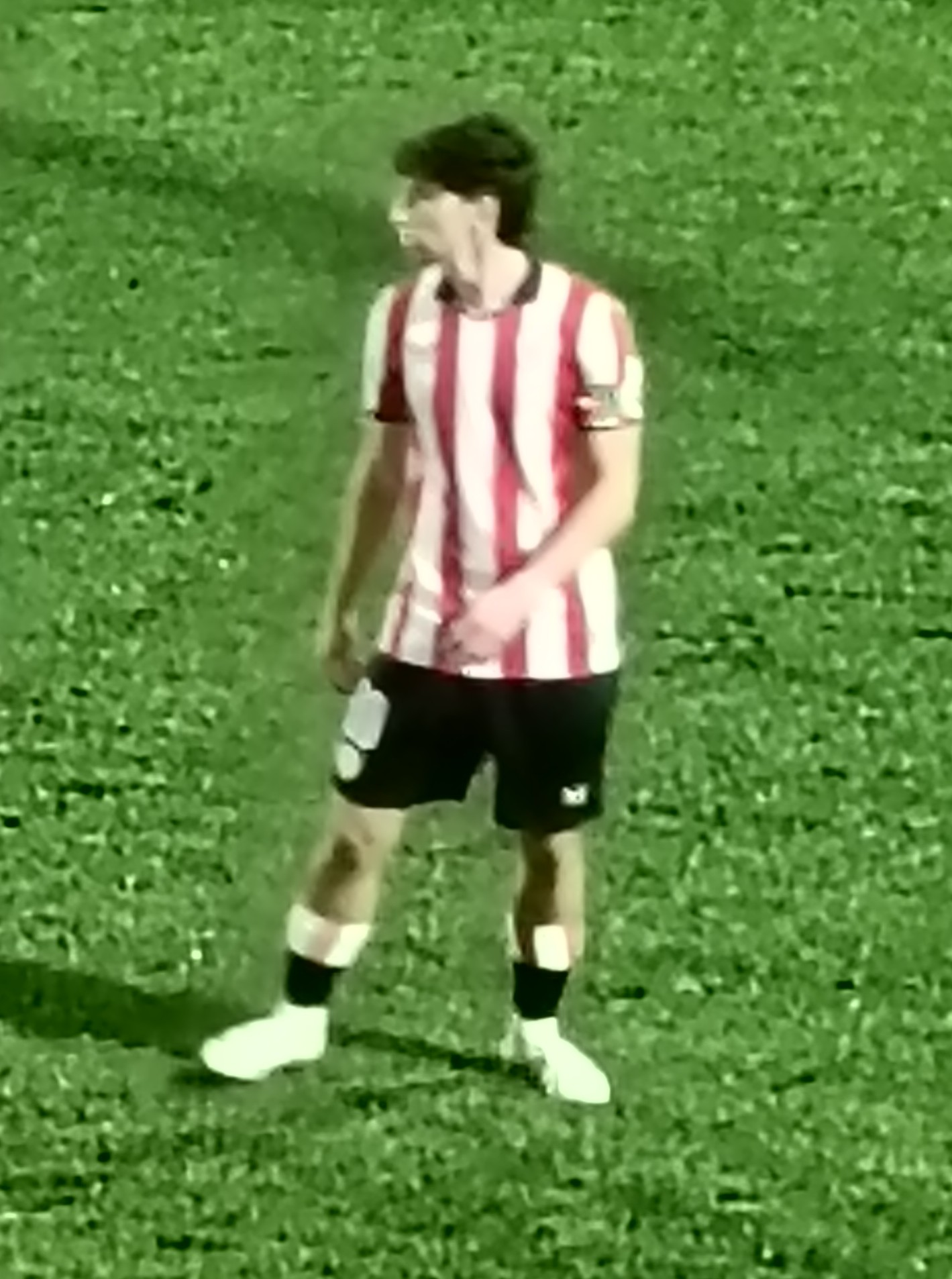
- Sánchez playing for Bilbao Athletic in 2025

Personal information
- Full name: Ibon Ignacio Sánchez Océn
- Date of birth: 8 March 2004 (age 22)
- Place of birth: Getxo, Spain
- Height: 1.77 m (5 ft 10 in)
- Position: Attacking midfielder

Team information
- Current team: Cádiz

Youth career
- 2015–2016: Getxo
- 2016–2018: Romo
- 2018–2022: Athletic Bilbao

Senior career*
Years	Team	Apps	(Gls)
2022–2023	Basconia	24	(2)
2023–2026	Bilbao Athletic	98	(11)
2025–2026	Athletic Bilbao	0	(0)
2026–	Cádiz	0	(0)
- * Club domestic league appearances and goals as of 27 May 2026

Ibon Ignacio Sánchez Océn (born 8 March 2004) is a Spanish footballer who plays as an attacking midfielder for Cádiz CF.

== Career ==
Born in Getxo, Biscay, Basque Country, Sánchez played for CD Getxo and Romo FC before joining Athletic Bilbao's Lezama youth academy in 2018, aged 14. He made his senior debut with farm team CD Basconia in the 2022–23 season, in Tercera Federación (the regionalised fifth tier).

Sánchez first appeared with Athletic's reserves in the Primera Federación (third tier) on 2 April 2023, coming on as a second-half substitute for Mikel Goti in a 1–0 home win over CA Osasuna B. After they suffered relegation, he subsequently became a regular starter for the B side, helping in their immediate promotion and becoming a team captain afterwards.

Sánchez made his first team debut on 1 October 2025, replacing Maroan Sannadi late on in a 4–1 loss away to Borussia Dortmund in the season's UEFA Champions League league phase. He continued to feature exclusively with the B-side afterwards.

On 7 July 2026, Sánchez signed a four-year contract with Segunda División side Cádiz CF.

== Honours ==
Bilbao Athletic

- Segunda Federación (Group 2): 2023–24
