= Robert Navarro (footballer) =

Spanish footballer (born 2002)

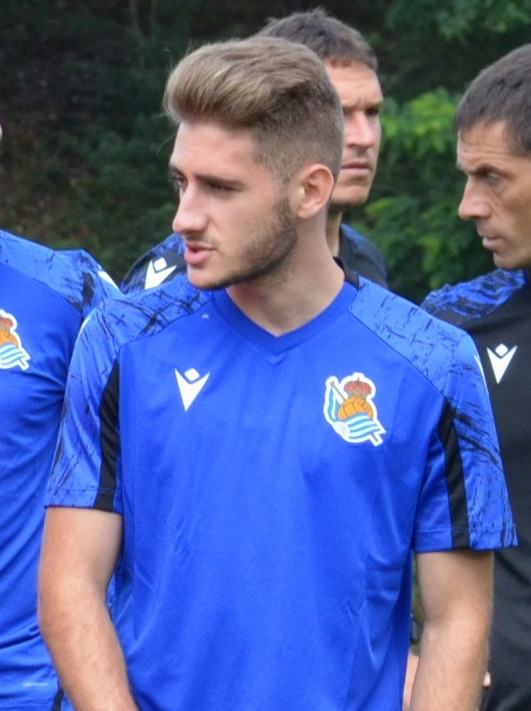
- Navarro training with Real Sociedad in 2021

Personal information
- Full name: Roberto Navarro Muñoz
- Date of birth: 12 April 2002 (age 24)
- Place of birth: Barcelona, Spain
- Height: 1.78 m (5 ft 10 in)
- Positions: Midfielder; winger

Team information
- Current team: Athletic Bilbao
- Number: 23

Youth career
- 2011–2013: Osasuna
- 2013–2018: Barcelona

Senior career*
Years	Team	Apps	(Gls)
2018–2019	Monaco II	11	(0)
2019	Monaco	0	(0)
2019–2022	Real Sociedad B	64	(13)
2020–2024	Real Sociedad	24	(0)
2023–2024	→ Cádiz (loan)	28	(1)
2024–2025	Mallorca	23	(1)
2025–	Athletic Bilbao	40	(8)

International career^{‡}
2018	Spain U16	3	(0)
2019	Spain U17	15	(4)
2019	Spain U18	4	(2)
2022	Spain U21	8	(4)
- * Club domestic league appearances and goals as of 1 November 2026 ‡ National team caps and goals as of 03:49, 16 October 2024 (UTC)

Roberto Navarro Muñoz (born 12 April 2002) is a Spanish professional footballer who plays as a midfielder or winger for Athletic Bilbao.

== Career ==
=== Early career ===
Navarro was born in Barcelona, Catalonia, but moved to Pamplona, Navarre at an early age. He started playing football with local side CA Osasuna before joining FC Barcelona at age 11, living with his maternal grandparents.

=== Monaco ===
On 3 July 2018, Navarro signed with AS Monaco FC. He made his senior debut for the club in a 1–0 Coupe de France win over Canet Roussillon FC on 6 January 2019, and at 16 years and 8 months was their youngest ever senior debutant.

=== Real Sociedad ===
On 2 September 2019, Navarro signed a professional contract with Real Sociedad for three years, being initially assigned to the reserves in Segunda División B. He made his first team – and La Liga – debut on 16 December 2020, replacing Ander Guevara in a 1–2 away loss against FC Barcelona.

Ahead of the 2021–22 season, Real Sociedad director of football Roberto Olabe announced that Navarro and Sanse teammate Jon Pacheco were promoted to the main squad. In January 2022, Navarro was demoted back to the B-team, due to the arrival of Rafinha for six-month loan duties at the first team. He scored his first professional goal on 9 April, netting the B's equalizer in a 2–1 home loss to CD Tenerife.

On 7 August 2022, Navarro returned to the first team, being assigned the number 17 jersey. He was the club's top scorer in the 2022–23 Copa del Rey with four goals.

==== Loan to Cádiz ====
On 1 September 2023, Navarro moved to fellow top tier side Cádiz CF on loan for the 2023–24 season. He scored his first goal in the top tier the following 29 March, netting the winner in a 1–0 home success over Granada CF.

=== Mallorca ===
On 29 August 2024, Navarro agreed to a one-year deal with RCD Mallorca also in the first division. He departed the club on 23 June of the following year, after one goal in 25 appearances overall.

=== Athletic Bilbao ===
On the same day Navarro left Mallorca, Athletic Bilbao announced his signing on a five-year contract. Although born in Catalonia and developed as a footballer mainly in that region, he was deemed eligible to join Athletic under their signing policy due to childhood years spent in Pamplona, including time at Osasuna's academy.

== Personal life ==
Navarro's father Roberto was also a professional footballer. A defender, he notably represented third tier sides CA Osasuna B, UE Sant Andreu and CE L'Hospitalet.

== Career statistics ==
As of match played 1 November 2026

Appearances and goals by club, season and competition
Club	Season	League			National cup (Note: Includes Coupe de France, Copa del Rey)		Europe		Other		Total	
Club	Season	Division	Apps	Goals	Apps	Goals	Apps	Goals	Apps	Goals	Apps	Goals
Monaco II	2018–19	CFA 2	11	0	—		—		—		11	0
Monaco	2018–19	Ligue 1	0	0	1	0	0	0	0	0	1	0
Real Sociedad B	2019–20	Segunda División B	16	2	—		—		—		16	2
Real Sociedad B	2020–21	Segunda División B	18	8	—		—		8 (Note: Appearances in Segunda División B play-offs)	3	26	11
Real Sociedad B	2021–22	Segunda División	24	1	—		—		—		24	1
Real Sociedad B	Total		58	11	—		—		8	3	66	14
Real Sociedad	2020–21	La Liga	1	0	0	0	—		—		1	0
Real Sociedad	2021–22	La Liga	6	0	1	0	—		—		7	0
Real Sociedad	2022–23	La Liga	17	0	5	4	4 (Note: Appearances in UEFA Europa League)	2	—		26	6
Real Sociedad	Total		24	0	6	4	4	2	—		34	6
Cádiz (loan)	2023–24	La Liga	28	1	2	0	—		—		30	1
Mallorca	2024–25	La Liga	23	1	1	0	—		1 (Note: Appearance in Supercopa de España)	0	25	1
Athletic Bilbao	2025–26	La Liga	32	6	4	0	7 (Note: Appearances in UEFA Champions League)	2	1	0	44	8
Athletic Bilbao	2026–27	La Liga	8	2	1	1	—		—		9	3
Athletic Bilbao	Total		40	8	5	1	7	2	1	0	53	11
Career total			184	20	15	5	11	4	10	3	220	32
