= Gorka Guruzeta =

Spanish footballer (born 1996)

Personal information
- Full name: Gorka Guruzeta Rodríguez
- Date of birth: 12 September 1996 (age 30)
- Place of birth: San Sebastián, Spain
- Height: 1.88 m (6 ft 2 in)
- Position: Striker

Team information
- Current team: Athletic Bilbao
- Number: 11

Youth career
- 2009–2010: Antiguoko
- 2010–2013: Vasconia Donostia
- 2013–2014: Antiguoko
- 2014–2015: Athletic Bilbao

Senior career*
Years	Team	Apps	(Gls)
2014–2015	Basconia	47	(16)
2015–2020	Bilbao Athletic	93	(29)
2018–2019	Athletic Bilbao	6	(0)
2020–2021	Sabadell	39	(3)
2021–2022	Amorebieta	37	(13)
2022–	Athletic Bilbao	138	(37)

International career^{‡}
2025–	Basque Country	1	(1)
- * Club domestic league appearances and goals as of 23:00, 17 October 2026 (UTC) ‡ National team caps and goals as of 15 November 2025

Gorka Guruzeta Rodríguez (born 12 September 1996) is a Spanish professional footballer who plays as a striker for La Liga club Athletic Bilbao.

== Club career ==
Born in San Sebastián, Gipuzkoa, Basque Country, Guruzeta joined Athletic Bilbao's youth setup in 2014, from Antiguoko KE. He made his debut as a senior with the farm team in the 2014–15 campaign, in Tercera División.

On 18 December 2015, profiting from the injury of Asier Villalibre, Guruzeta was promoted to the reserves in Segunda División. He made his professional debut three days later, starting in a 1–1 home draw against CD Lugo. He also had a taste of European competition, scoring four goals in as many games in the 2015–16 Premier League International Cup.

Guruzeta made his first-team – and La Liga – debut on 27 August 2018, replacing Markel Susaeta late into a 2–2 home draw against SD Huesca; he went on to appear in eight more league and Copa del Rey matches during the campaign, with one goal in a cup fixture away to Sevilla FC (Athletic won on the night but lost the tie on aggregate). In April 2019, back playing for the B-team in the third tier, he suffered a serious injury, rupturing the anterior cruciate ligament of his right knee. He made a successful recovery but did not play again for the first team.

On 1 September 2020, Guruzeta terminated his contract with the Lions, and signed a three-year contract with second division newcomers CE Sabadell FC just hours later, with Athletic retaining an option until 2022 to buy him back. He scored his first professional goal on 22 November, netting his team's second in a 3–1 home success over UD Las Palmas. On 16 July 2021, after suffering relegation, Guruzeta signed for SD Amorebieta.

On July 3, 2022, Guruzeta returned to Athletic Bilbao, signing a two-year contract. On 29 August, he scored his first La Liga goals, netting a brace in a 4–0 thrashing of Cádiz at the Nuevo Mirandilla. On 8 November, in his first start, he scored a brace in a 3–0 win against Valladolid at San Mamés.

On 19 August 2023, Guruzeta scored his first goal in the 2023–24 season in a 2–0 away victory against Osasuna, combining with Nico Williams as he would several more times over the subsequent months. On 24 January 2024, Guruzeta scored after 36 seconds at San Mamés in a 4–2 victory against Barcelona after extra time in the Copa del Rey quarter-finals. On 20 February, he renewed his contract with Athletic until 2028. On 29 February, he scored the third goal against Atlético Madrid in the Copa semi-final second leg. On 6 April, he started in the Copa del Rey final against Mallorca, in which his club won the trophy via a penalty shoot-out after a 1–1 draw. Although Guruzeta missed the last five matches of the season after contracting appendicitis, which required immediate surgery (depriving him of the chance to increase his total towards his pursuit of the Zarra Trophy), he concluded the 2023–24 campaign as the top scorer for his club, and also set a new personal best in La Liga by scoring 14 goals.

Guruzeta was less prolific in 2024–25 with just eight goals from 51 appearances, hampered by a foot injury and with Maroan Sannadi arriving to challenge for his position, although the club finished fourth in La Liga, their best finish in a decade. He managed to score five times in the 2025–26 UEFA Champions League, his first experience of the elite competition.

== International career ==
Guruzeta was called up to the Basque Country national team for a friendly match against Palestine on 15 November 2025.

== Personal life ==
Guruzeta's father, Xabier, was also a footballer; a central defender, he mainly represented Real Sociedad during his career. His younger brother Jon, who plays as a right winger, also began his career at Antiguoko before agreeing to join Athletic Bilbao's cantera in 2018.

== Career statistics ==
As of match played 17 October 2026

Appearances and goals by club, season and competition
Club	Season	League			Copa del Rey		Europe		Other		Total	
Club	Season	Division	Apps	Goals	Apps	Goals	Apps	Goals	Apps	Goals	Apps	Goals
Basconia	2015–16	Tercera Federación	22	6	–		–		–		22	6
Basconia	2016–17	Tercera Federación	25	10	–		–		–		25	10
Basconia	Total		47	16	–		–		–		47	16
Bilbao Athletic	2015–16	Segunda División	5	0	–		–		–		5	0
Bilbao Athletic	2016–17	Segunda División B	32	7	–		–		–		32	7
Bilbao Athletic	2017–18	Segunda División B	37	16	–		–		2 (Note: Appearance in Segunda División B play-offs)	2	39	18
Bilbao Athletic	2018–19	Segunda División B	6	1	–		–		–		6	1
Bilbao Athletic	2019–20	Segunda División B	13	5	–		–		1	0	13	5
Bilbao Athletic	Total		93	29	–		–		3	2	96	31
Athletic Bilbao	2018–19	La Liga	6	0	3	0	–		–		9	0
Sabadell	2020–21	Segunda División	39	3	1	0	–		–		40	3
Amorebieta	2021–22	Segunda División	37	13	1	0	–		–		38	13
Athletic Bilbao	2022–23	La Liga	30	6	7	0	–		–		37	6
Athletic Bilbao	2023–24	La Liga	32	14	4	2	–		–		36	16
Athletic Bilbao	2024–25	La Liga	36	7	2	0	12 (Note: Appearances in UEFA Europa League)	1	1 (Note: Appearance in Supercopa de España)	0	51	8
Athletic Bilbao	2025–26	La Liga	35	10	5	2	7 (Note: Appearances in UEFA Champions League)	5	1	0	48	17
Athletic Bilbao	2026–27	La Liga	5	0	0	0	—		—		5	0
Athletic Bilbao	Total		138	37	18	4	19	6	2	0	177	47
Career total			260	98	23	4	19	6	5	2	407	110

== Honours ==
Athletic Bilbao

- Copa del Rey: 2023–24

Individual

- La Liga Play of the Month: August 2023 (with Nico Williams)
