= Maroan Sannadi =

Moroccan footballer (born 2001)

Maroan Sannadi مروان سنادي
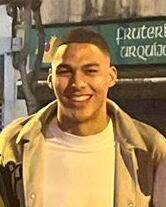
- Sannadi in 2025

Personal information
- Full name: Maroan Sannadi Harrouch
- Date of birth: 1 February 2001 (age 25)
- Place of birth: Vitoria-Gasteiz, Spain
- Height: 1.92 m (6 ft 4 in)
- Position: Forward

Team information
- Current team: Athletic Bilbao
- Number: 21

Youth career
- Lakua
- Aurrerá

Senior career*
Years	Team	Apps	(Gls)
2020–2021	Ariznabarra	29	(4)
2021–2022	San Ignacio	35	(16)
2022–2025	Alavés B	55	(17)
2024–2025	→ Barakaldo (loan)	20	(11)
2025–	Athletic Bilbao	32	(2)

International career^{‡}
2025–	Morocco	3	(0)
- * Club domestic league appearances and goals as of 25 October 2026 ‡ National team caps and goals as of 8 September 2025

Maroan Sannadi Harrouch (Moroccan Arabic: مروان سنادي حروش; born 1 February 2001) is a professional footballer who plays as a forward for La Liga club Athletic Bilbao. Born in Spain, he plays for the Morocco national team.

== Club career ==
=== Early career ===
Born in Vitoria-Gasteiz, Álava, Basque Country to Moroccan parents originating from Casablanca, Sannadi represented hometown sides CD Lakua and CD Aurrerá de Vitoria as a youth. On 18 September 2020, after finishing his formation, he joined Tercera División side CD Ariznabarra.

=== Alavés ===
In 2021, Sannadi signed for Deportivo Alavés, being initially assigned to farm team Club San Ignacio in Tercera División RFEF. He was promoted to the reserves in Segunda Federación in the following year, after scoring a career-best 16 goals for San Ignacio.

On 29 February 2024, Sannadi renewed his contract with the Babazorros until 2027.

==== Loan to Barakaldo ====
On 16 July 2024, Sannadi was loaned to Primera Federación side Barakaldo CF for the season. He scored braces for the club in wins over Gimnàstic de Tarragona (2–1), Cultural y Deportiva Leonesa (3–0) and CA Osasuna B (2–1), and reached 11 goals in only 20 appearances.

=== Athletic Bilbao ===
After being a target of Athletic Bilbao since October 2024, Sannadi signed a four-and-a-half-year contract with the club on 1 February 2025, his 24th birthday; the fee was not disclosed officially, but was reported as being an initial €3 million to Alavés plus potential add-ons for meeting targets, as well as payments to Barakaldo and formative clubs. He made his club and La Liga debut a week later as a second-half substitute in a 3–0 win over Girona at San Mamés (Endika Buján, a reserve squad member and fellow former Barakaldo player, doing likewise). He was the first player of Moroccan origin to play for Athletic Bilbao's senior team under their policy restricting themselves to using local players.

Immediately installed as a contender for the starting striker role, head coach Ernesto Valverde soon selected the raw Sannadi ahead of Gorka Guruzeta in several important fixtures; within his first few months at the elite level he had played in the Stadio Olimpico in Rome, Ibrox Stadium in Glasgow, Old Trafford in Manchester and most of the domestic arenas, causing concern for experienced defenders with his physical presence and link-up play – though only scoring once and attracting some criticism for his awkward style – as Athletic reached the semi-finals of the 2024–25 UEFA Europa League and finished fourth in La Liga to qualify for the UEFA Champions League for the first time in a decade.

On 30 October 2025, the club announced that Sannadi would undergo surgery on his right knee to fix an ongoing meniscus issue, with the resulting lay-off causing him to miss most of the club's Champions League campaign and the 2025 Africa Cup of Nations with Morocco, also potentially hampering his chances of being selected for the upcoming 2026 FIFA World Cup.

== International career ==
Eligible to represent either Spain or Morocco, Sannadi declared allegiance to the latter, stating that playing for the national team is "his biggest dream". He received a first international call-up in May 2025 and made his debut as a substitute in the friendly fixture against Tunisia on 6 June, providing an assist for fellow sub Ayoub Kaabi to score the last goal of a 2–0 victory for the Atlas Lions; he became the first Athletic Bilbao player to represent any North African or Arab nation at full international level. His third cap against Zambia three months later was in 2026 FIFA World Cup qualification, tying him to Morocco officially.

== Career statistics ==
=== Club ===
As of match played 25 October 2026

Appearances and goals by club, season and competition
Club	Season	League			Copa del Rey		Europe		Other		Total	
Club	Season	Division	Apps	Goals	Apps	Goals	Apps	Goals	Apps	Goals	Apps	Goals
Ariznabarra	2020–21	Tercera División	29	4	—		—		—		29	4
San Ignacio	2021–22	Tercera División	35	16	—		—		—		35	16
Alavés B	2022–23	Segunda Federación	24	7	—		—		4 (Note: Appearances in Segunda Federación play-offs)	0	28	7
Alavés B	2023–24	Segunda Federación	31	10	—		—		—		31	10
Alavés B	Total		55	17	—		—		4	0	59	17
Barakaldo (loan)	2024–25	Primera Federación	20	11	2	0	—		—		22	11
Athletic Bilbao	2024–25	La Liga	16	1	—		6 (Note: Appearances in UEFA Europa League)	0	—		22	1
Athletic Bilbao	2025–26	La Liga	10	1	0	0	1 (Note: Appearances in UEFA Champions League)	0	0	0	11	1
Athletic Bilbao	2026–27	La Liga	6	0	0	0	—		—		6	0
Athletic Bilbao	Total		32	2	0	0	7	0	0	0	39	1
Career total			171	50	2	0	7	0	4	0	184	50

=== International ===
As of match played 8 September 2025

Appearances and goals by national team and year
National team	Year	Apps	Goals
Morocco	2025	3	0
Total		3	0

== See also ==
- Moroccans in Spain
