= Nico Williams =

Spanish footballer (born 2002)

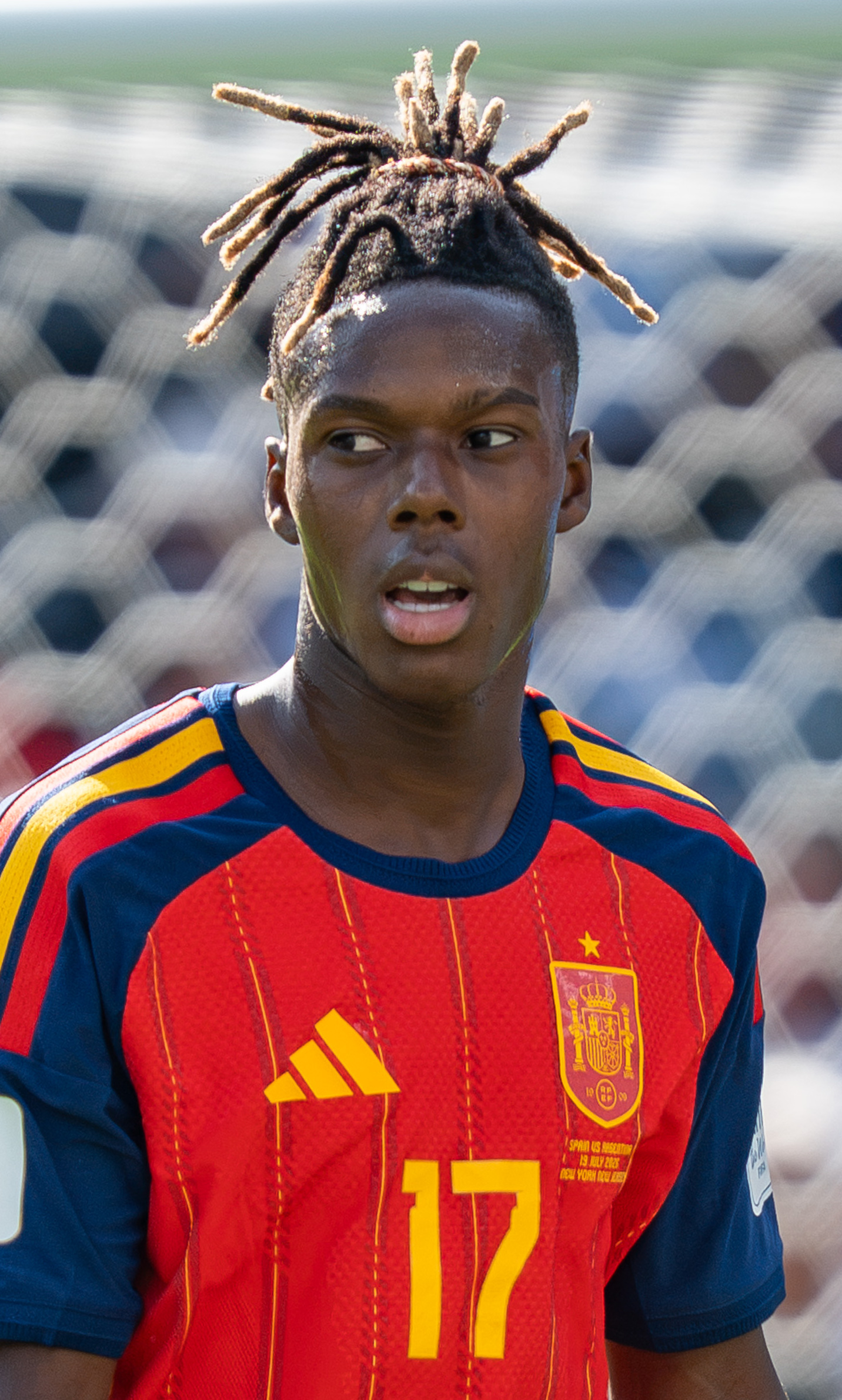
- Williams with Spain in 2026

Personal information
- Full name: Nicholas Williams Arthuer
- Date of birth: 12 July 2002 (age 24)
- Place of birth: Pamplona, Navarre, Spain
- Height: 1.81 m (5 ft 11 in)
- Position: Winger

Team information
- Current team: Athletic Bilbao
- Number: 10

Youth career
- 2010–2012: Pamplona
- 2012–2013: Osasuna
- 2013–2019: Athletic Bilbao

Senior career*
Years	Team	Apps	(Gls)
2019–2020	Basconia	3	(0)
2020–2021	Bilbao Athletic	24	(9)
2021–	Athletic Bilbao	168	(24)

International career^{‡}
2019–2021	Spain U18	4	(2)
2021–2022	Spain U21	5	(1)
2022–	Spain	39	(8)
Medal record
Men's football
Representing Spain
FIFA World Cup
Winner	2026 Canada–Mexico–US
UEFA European Championship
Winner	2024 Germany
UEFA Nations League
Runner-up	2025 Germany
- * Club domestic league appearances and goals as of 23:51, 20 November 2026 (UTC) ‡ National team caps and goals as of 15 November 2026 (UTC)

Nicholas Williams Arthuer (born 12 July 2002) is a Spanish professional footballer who plays as a winger for La Liga club Athletic Bilbao and the Spain national team. He is recognised for his speed and dribbling skills.

Joining Athletic Bilbao's youth academy in 2013, he was promoted to the reserve team in 2020 and to the first team a year later, becoming a teammate of elder brother Iñaki Williams, with both winning the 2023–24 Copa del Rey.

Williams debuted for Spain's senior side in 2022. He was a member of their 2022 World Cup, Euro 2024 and 2026 World Cup squads. He scored and was named man of the match in the 2024 final as Spain won the tournament. At the 2026 World Cup, Williams made six appearances as a substitute including in the final, where he provided the assist for the only goal as his country won their second world title.

== Club career ==
=== Basconia ===
Born in Pamplona, Navarre, Williams has Ghanaian descent from both his parents. His mother, Maria, was pregnant with his brother Iñaki when she left Ghana with his father Felix. He joined the youth academy of Athletic Bilbao in 2013 from hometown side CA Osasuna. He began his senior career with the club's farm team, Basconia, during the 2019–20 season.

=== Bilbao Athletic and Athletic Bilbao ===
==== 2020–2021 season ====
On 11 May 2020, Williams was promoted to the reserve team in the Segunda División B. He made his first-team—and La Liga—debut on 28 April the following year, coming on as a second-half substitute for Jon Morcillo in a 2–2 home draw against Real Valladolid; his brother Iñaki also came off the bench ten minutes later. It was the first time two siblings had been on the pitch at the same time for the club since Julio and Patxi Salinas in 1986.

==== 2021–2022 season ====
Williams scored his first two goals for the Lions on 6 January 2022, in a 2–0 win over Atlético Mancha Real in the campaign's Copa del Rey. Seven days later, he scored the winning goal in a 2–1 victory over Atlético Madrid in the semi-final of the 2022 Supercopa de España. On 20 January 2022, Williams was given a first team contract after meeting a number of clauses.

==== 2022–2023 season ====
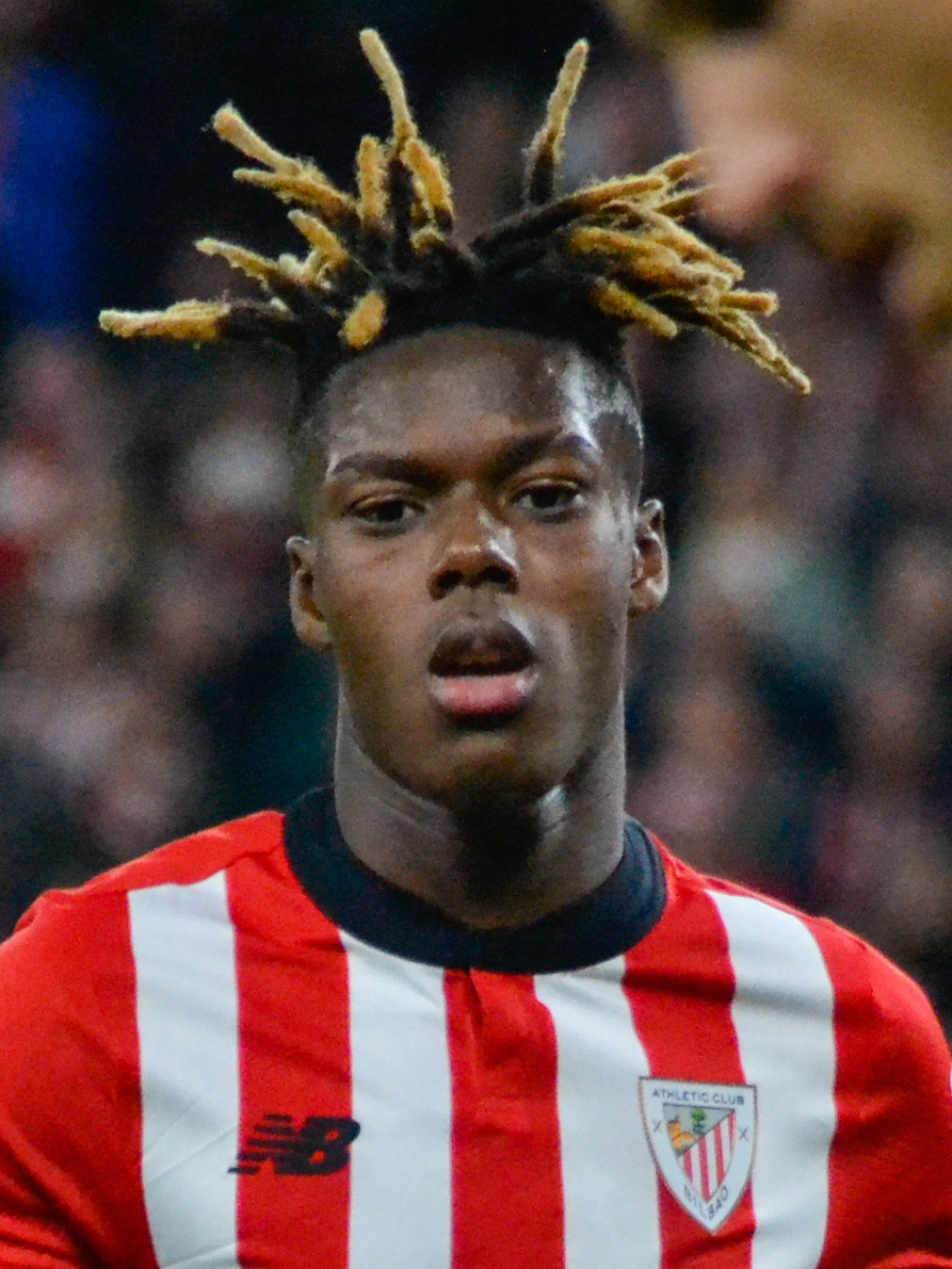
Williams playing for Athletic Bilbao in 2023

Williams was a starter in four of the first five matches of the 2022–23 La Liga campaign, and was named player of the match in a 4–1 away win against Elche CF on 11 September 2022. In the first half-hour of the match he pressurised an opponent into conceding an own goal, was tripped to give his side a penalty (converted by Oihan Sancet) then scored himself via a dribble from the right wing and powerful shot for his first goal in the competition. Coincidentally this was the same venue and opponent where his brother first found the net in the league seven years earlier. He scored again the following week, the decisive goal of a 3–2 victory over Rayo Vallecano and his first at San Mamés. After missing two good scoring chances in the 2022–23 Copa del Rey semi-final as Athletic were knocked out by rivals Osasuna, Williams was forced to deactivate his social media accounts temporarily due to the volume and nature of abusive messages sent to him; he recovered from this disappointment to score the winner against Espanyol in the league four days later.

==== 2023–2024 season ====
Athletic made a strong start to the 2023–24 La Liga season with Williams providing numerous scoring chances, mainly from the left wing as coach Ernesto Valverde settled on a front line featuring Iñaki on the opposite flank and Gorka Guruzeta in the centre, supported by Oihan Sancet. With Williams's contract expiring in 2024 and media speculation linking him with clubs such as Aston Villa, Barcelona, Liverpool and Real Madrid, his representatives negotiated with the club for several months before a new contract running to 2027 was agreed on 1 December 2023. On 6 April 2024 in the Copa del Rey final against Mallorca, he provided the assist for Sancet to score, and was subsequently named Man of the Match. The final ended in a 1–1 draw and Athletic went on to win a penalty shootout to claim their first major trophy in 40 years. The club also finished fifth in the league, their highest position for eight years. He was nominated for the 2024 edition of the Ballon d'Or, finishing 15th. Despite the new contract, its relatively low buyout clause of approximately €58 million combined with his good form for club and country meant that he continued to be linked with other top clubs, most prominently Barcelona due to his friendship with Lamine Yamal, throughout the 2024 summer transfer window, though no party paid the release fee and Athletic were not interested in selling; Williams ultimately confirmed that he would be staying for at least one year longer.

==== 2024–2025 season ====
In the 2024–25 season, Williams's statistical return was similar to the previous campaign, although his performances were periodically affected by injury issues and he was assessed to have "not had a particularly standout season", with the club's strong form in La Liga (in which they qualified for the UEFA Champions League for the first time in a decade) largely due to a strong defence, while Oihan Sancet was the most effective attacking component. Williams made his first appearances in continental competition, scoring five times including decisive goals in knockout ties against Roma and Rangers and being named in the team of the tournament as Athletic progressed to the semi-finals of the UEFA Europa League, but they were unsuccessful in their efforts to reach the final (to be staged at San Mamés) and also made early exits from the Supercopa de España and their defence of the Copa del Rey.

==== 2025–2026 season ====
In June 2025, speculation over his future intensified, with Barcelona widely reported as having agreed contractual terms with the player but seeking to pay the transfer fee in instalments due to ongoing financial constraints – which also had the potential to complicate his registration upon completion of the move – as Athletic stood firm over their demand for the contractual release clause fee to be paid up entirely, their position entrenched due to the historic rivalry between the clubs and the Bilbao hierarchy's ongoing irritation towards their counterparts in Catalonia at the manner of the protracted pursuit. Amid the usual sensationalised media reports, side issues included an officially-publicised meeting between the presidents of Athletic and LaLiga in relation to the enforcement of financial regulations, and the defacement of a mural of Williams in Barakaldo by local fans angry at his reported departure, an action repeated after the club condemned the vandalism and paid for a restoration. On 4 July, Williams renewed his contract with Athletic Bilbao in a 10-year deal, set to run until 2035 and with a reported release clause fee of around €90 million; the announcement video included the Barakaldo mural being spraypainted at night with the slogan 'WIN 2035' by a hooded figure, revealed to be the player.

The renewal video later won an award for best social media content of the year in Spanish football, but on the field the 2025–26 season was one of frustration for the club as they were weakened by several injuries and struggled to balance the demands of domestic competitions and the Champions League. Williams was hampered by a persistent pubalgia issue, missing several matches (making only three European appearances) and having little impact on others as efforts were made to manage the condition gradually, with surgery ruled out due to the potential for further complications. Williams occasionally showed flashes of his best form and scored a solo effort against Real Oviedo in November 2025 which was voted as Goal of the Month, but by February 2026 it was clear that the situation was of little benefit to the player or team and he was withdrawn from the Athletic squad to undergo more intense treatment. He returned to action two months later and contributed decisively (an assist and two late goals) to an away win over Deportivo Alavés which eased fears over relegation, but then was absent for the end of the league campaign with a hamstring injury.

== International career ==
=== Youth ===
Williams first represented Spain with the under-18 squad in 2020, scoring two goals in four games. He was called up to the Spain under-19s in February 2021, and made his debut for the under-21s in September of the same year.

=== Senior ===
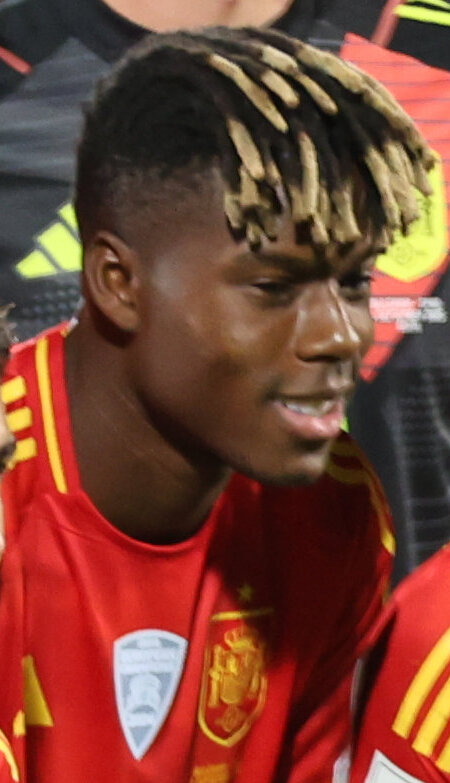
Williams with Spain in 2025

Williams received his first call-up to the senior squad, coached by Luis Enrique, for 2022–23 UEFA Nations League fixtures in September 2022, and made his debut in a 2–1 home defeat against Switzerland. On 17 November, he scored his first goal for the national team in a 3–1 friendly win against Jordan. He subsequently was called up for the 2022 FIFA World Cup, where he made four appearances with one start as Spain were eliminated on penalties by Morocco in the round of 16. He missed the 2023 UEFA Nations League Finals due to injury.

==== UEFA Euro 2024 ====
In May 2024, Williams was selected in the 26-man squad for the UEFA Euro 2024. He was named man of the match in Spain's second group game of the tournament against Italy following a 1–0 victory. He scored his first goal in the European competition in a 4–1 victory over Georgia in the round of 16, in addition to providing an assist and achieving 100% pass accuracy, becoming the first player to achieve this feat in the tournament. He scored the opening goal of the final against England with a low left-footed shot following a pass from fellow winger Lamine Yamal; Spain won 2–1 to claim the trophy for a record fourth time with Williams named as Player of the Match. He featured regularly in the 2024–25 UEFA Nations League in which Spain reached the final but lost on penalties to Portugal.

==== 2026 FIFA World Cup ====
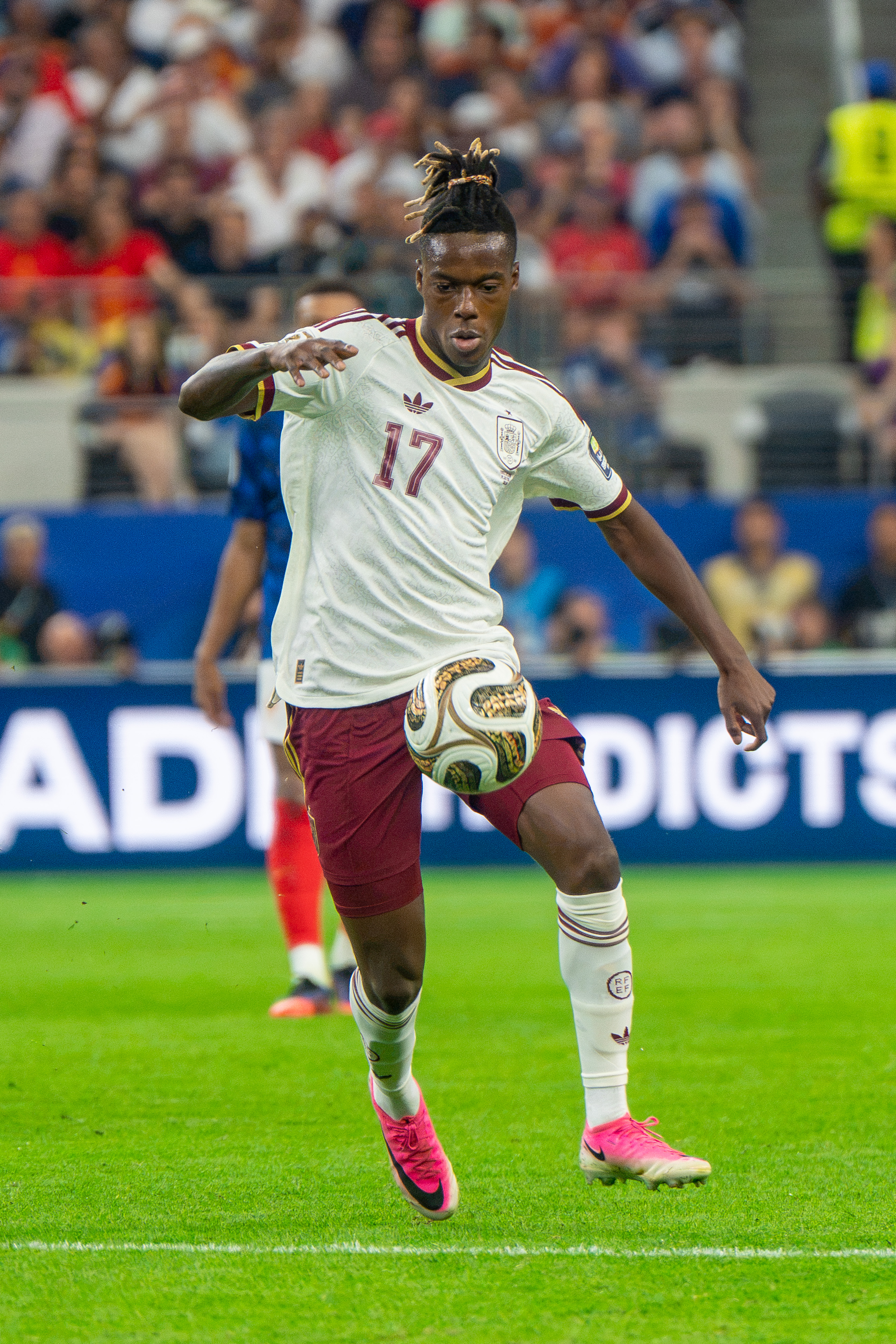
Williams playing for Spain at the 2026 FIFA World Cup

On 25 May 2026, Williams was selected in the 26-man squad for the 2026 FIFA World Cup, though he was still not fully fit in his recovery from a persistent pubalgia problem and a hamstring injury and was expected to play only a supporting role in the early stages. On 27 June, during his third appearance in the tournament (all from the bench), he suffered a right adductor muscle injury after a challenge from Uruguay's Nicolás de la Cruz, which would keep him out for the next two rounds. He returned to action as a substitute in the quarter-final against Belgium, which ended in a 2–1 victory. He again came off the bench in the 2–0 semi-final victory over France, and in the final on 19 July against Argentina; the match went to extra time, where he had a goal disallowed for an earlier foul, then headed a Pedro Porro cross back towards the penalty spot to provide the assist for Ferran Torres to score the only goal and win the World Cup for Spain.

== Personal life ==
Williams was born in Pamplona, Navarre, Spain to Ghanaian immigrants, who travelled across the Sahara Desert and climbed the fence to reach Melilla, a Spanish city in Northern Africa, where they were detained by the civil guard. While they were in jail, a lawyer from the Catholic aid organisation Caritas told his parents: "The only thing you can try is tell them you're from a country at war." They tore up their Ghanaian papers and said they were from Liberia to apply for political asylum.

His elder brother, football forward Iñaki Williams born in Bilbao, Biscay, having been born sometime after his parents arrived there, also came through the youth ranks of Athletic Bilbao. Nico typically wears Williams Jr on the back of his shirt to distinguish himself from Iñaki, including in international matches that do not involve him, who represented Ghana at international level from 2022 to 2026.

== Career statistics ==
=== Club ===
As of match played 20 November 2026

Appearances and goals by club, season and competition
Club	Season	League			Copa del Rey		Europe		Other		Total	
Club	Season	Division	Apps	Goals	Apps	Goals	Apps	Goals	Apps	Goals	Apps	Goals
Basconia	2019–20	Tercera División	3	0	—		—		1 (Note: Appearance in Tercera División play-offs)	0	4	0
Athletic Bilbao B	2020–21	Segunda División B	24	9	—		—		2 (Note: Appearances in Segunda División B play-offs)	0	26	9
Athletic Bilbao	2020–21	La Liga	2	0	0	0	—		0	0	2	0
Athletic Bilbao	2021–22	La Liga	34	0	4	2	—		2 (Note: Appearance(s) in Supercopa de España)	1	40	3
Athletic Bilbao	2022–23	La Liga	36	6	7	3	—		—		43	9
Athletic Bilbao	2023–24	La Liga	31	5	6	3	—		—		37	8
Athletic Bilbao	2024–25	La Liga	29	5	2	1	13 (Note: Appearances in UEFA Europa League)	5	1	0	45	11
Athletic Bilbao	2025–26	La Liga	25	6	4	0	3 (Note: Appearances in UEFA Champions League)	0	0	0	32	6
Athletic Bilbao	2026–27	La Liga	11	2	0	0	—		—		11	2
Athletic Bilbao	Total		168	24	23	9	16	5	3	1	210	39
Career total			195	33	23	9	16	5	6	1	240	48

=== International ===
As of match played 15 November 2026

Appearances and goals by national team and year
National team	Year	Apps	Goals
Spain	2022	7	1
Spain	2023	4	1
Spain	2024	13	2
Spain	2025	6	2
Spain	2026	9	2
Total		39	8

As of match played 15 November 2026

Spain score listed first, score column indicates score after each Williams goal.

List of international goals scored by Nico Williams
No.	Date	Venue	Opponent	Score	Result	Competition
1	17 November 2022	Amman International Stadium, Amman, Jordan	Jordan	3–0	3–1	Friendly
2	8 September 2023	Boris Paichadze Dinamo Arena, Tbilisi, Georgia	Georgia	6–1	7–1	UEFA Euro 2024 qualifying
3	30 June 2024	RheinEnergieStadion, Cologne, Germany	Georgia	3–1	4–1	UEFA Euro 2024
4	14 July 2024	Olympiastadion, Berlin, Germany	England	1–0	2–1	UEFA Euro 2024
5	20 March 2025	De Kuip, Rotterdam, Netherlands	Netherlands	1–0	2–2	2024–25 UEFA Nations League A
6	5 June 2025	MHPArena, Stuttgart, Germany	France	1–0	5–4	2025 UEFA Nations League Finals
7	29 September 2026	Ramón Sánchez-Pizjuán Stadium, Seville, Spain	Croatia	4–1	4–1	2026–27 UEFA Nations League A
8	15 November 2026	Metropolitano Stadium, Madrid, Spain	England	2–3	2–3	2026–27 UEFA Nations League A

== Honours ==
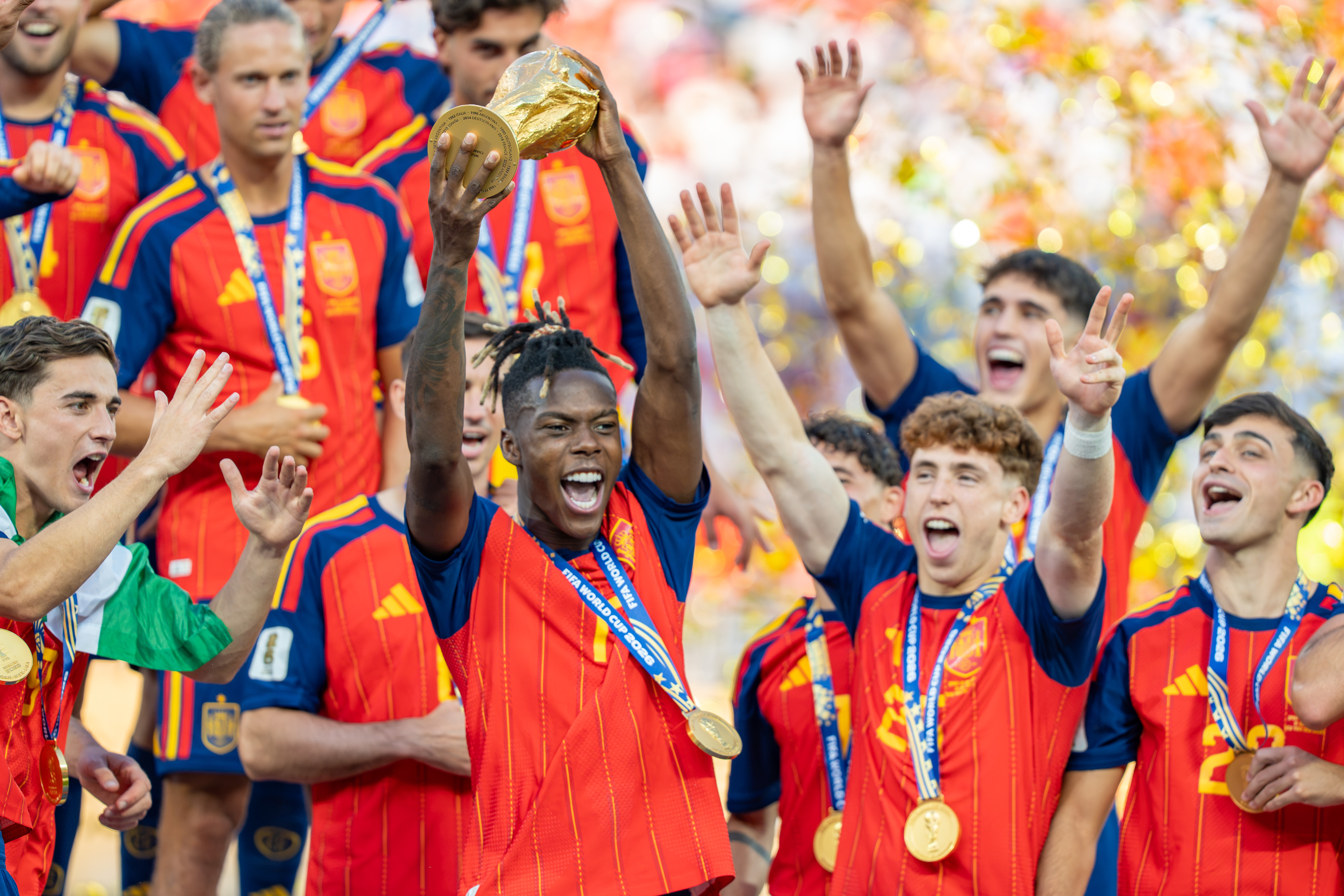
Williams holding the FIFA World Cup Trophy after Spain won the 2026 final

Athletic Bilbao

- Copa del Rey: 2023–24

Spain

- FIFA World Cup: 2026
- UEFA European Championship: 2024
- UEFA Nations League runner-up: 2024–25

Individual

- La Liga Play of the Month: August 2023 (with Gorka Guruzeta), December 2023 (with Iñigo Lekue)
- UEFA European Championship Team of the Tournament: 2024
- UEFA Europa League Team of the Season: 2024–25

== See also ==
- Afro-Spaniards
