= 2021 Supercopa de España final =

Final of the 37th edition of Supercopa de España

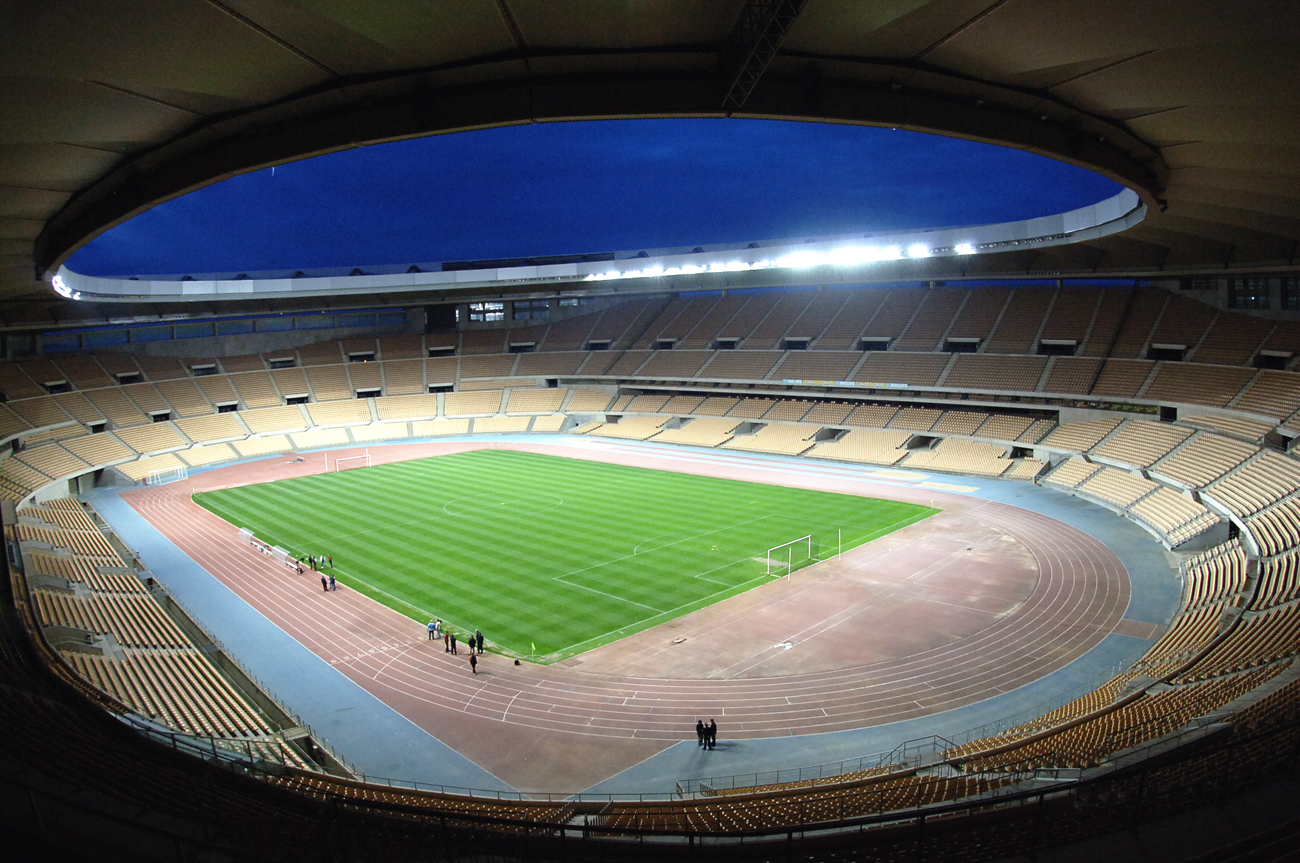
- The Estadio La Cartuja in Seville hosted the final.
- Event: 2021 Supercopa de España
Barcelona	Athletic Bilbao
2	3
- After extra time
- Date: 17 January 2021
- Venue: Estadio de La Cartuja, Seville
- Man of the Match: Iñaki Williams (Athletic Bilbao)
- Referee: Jesús Gil Manzano (Extremadura)
- Attendance: 0 (Note: The match was played behind closed doors due to the COVID-19 pandemic in Spain.)
- Weather: Partly Cloudy; 10 °C (50 °F); 66% humidity

The 2021 Supercopa de España final decided the winner of the 2021 Supercopa de España, the 37th edition of the annual Spanish football super cup competition. The match was played on 17 January 2021 at the Estadio de La Cartuja in Seville, Spain. The match was a clásico between Barcelona and Athletic Bilbao.

Athletic Bilbao won the match 3–2 after extra time to win their third Supercopa de España title.

== Teams ==
Team	Qualification for tournament	Previous finals appearances (bold indicates winners)
Barcelona	2019–20 La Liga runners-up	23 (**1983**, 1985, 1988, 1990, **1991**, **1992**, 1993, **1994**, **1996**, 1997, 1998, 1999, **2005**, **2006**, **2009**, **2010**, **2011**, 2012, **2013**, 2015, **2016**, 2017, **2018**)
Athletic Bilbao	2019–20 Copa del Rey runners-up (Note: Outcome of the 2020 Copa del Rey final was not known at the time of the 2020–21 Supercopa de España being played, reaching it granted qualification to both finalists.)	4 (1983, **1984**, (Note: Athletic Bilbao won the double in 1983–84, and thus were automatically awarded the Supercopa de España title for 1984.) 2009, **2015**)

== Route to the final ==
Barcelona		Round	Athletic Bilbao	
Opponent	Result	2020–21 Supercopa de España	Opponent	Result
Real Sociedad	1–1 (a.e.t.), 3–2 (p)	Semi-finals	Real Madrid	2–1

== Match ==
=== Summary ===
Barcelona took the lead in the 40th minute through Antoine Griezmann who finished from a rebound after neat interplay between Lionel Messi and Jordi Alba. Athletic Bilbao replied immediately as Óscar de Marcos scored just two minutes later, assisted by Iñaki Williams, to make it 1–1 going to half time. In the second half, Athletic Bilbao had a goal ruled out for a narrow offside in the 55th minute via VAR after Raúl García's header found the back of the net. Griezmann got his second goal in the 77th minute from another Jordi Alba's cross to give Barcelona the lead again, before substitute Asier Villalibre's 90th-minute equaliser, a volley from an Iker Muniain free kick, forced the game into extra time. Athletic Bilbao started well in the extra period and got their third, match-winning goal in the 93rd minute through a curling drive into the top corner from Williams, who was subsequently named man of the match. Barcelona captain Messi was sent off in the final minutes for striking Villalibre as Barcelona ended the game with 10 players on the pitch.

=== Details ===
17 January 2021
21:00 CET

Barcelona	2–3 (a.e.t.)	Athletic Bilbao
Griezmann 40', 77'	Report	De Marcos 42'; Villalibre 90'; Williams 93'

La Cartuja, Seville
Attendance: 0
Referee: Jesús Gil Manzano (Extremadura)

**Barcelona**	**Athletic Bilbao**

GK	1	(Germany) Marc-André ter Stegen
RB	2	(United States) Sergiño Dest		(substituted off) 46'
CB	4	(Uruguay) Ronald Araújo
CB	15	(France) Clément Lenglet	(yellow card) 11'	(substituted off) 106'
LB	18	(Spain) Jordi Alba	(yellow card) 114'
CM	21	(Netherlands) Frenkie de Jong
CM	5	(Spain) Sergio Busquets		(substituted off) 97'
CM	16	(Spain) Pedri		(substituted off) 88'
RW	11	(France) Ousmane Dembélé		(substituted off) 88'
CF	10	(Argentina) Lionel Messi (c)	(red card) 120+1'
LW	7	(France) Antoine Griezmann
Substitutes:
GK	13	(Brazil) Neto
GK	26	(Spain) Iñaki Peña
DF	23	(France) Samuel Umtiti
DF	24	(Spain) Junior Firpo
DF	28	(Spain) Óscar Mingueza		(substituted on) 46'
MF	8	(Bosnia and Herzegovina) Miralem Pjanić		(substituted on) 88'
MF	12	(Spain) Riqui Puig		(substituted on) 97'
FW	9	(Denmark) Martin Braithwaite		(substituted on) 88'
FW	17	(Portugal) Francisco Trincão		(substituted on) 106'
Manager:
(Netherlands) Ronald Koeman

GK	1	(Spain) Unai Simón
RB	21	(Spain) Ander Capa		(substituted off) 81'
CB	5	(Spain) Yeray Álvarez
CB	4	(Spain) Iñigo Martínez		(substituted off) 95'
LB	24	(Spain) Mikel Balenziaga		(substituted off) 83'
RM	18	(Spain) Óscar de Marcos
CM	27	(Spain) Unai Vencedor		(substituted off) 81'
CM	14	(Spain) Dani García	(yellow card) 67'
LM	10	(Spain) Iker Muniain (c)
CF	22	(Spain) Raúl García		(substituted off) 83'
CF	9	(Spain) Iñaki Williams		(substituted off) 106'
Substitutes:
GK	13	(Spain) Jokin Ezkieta
DF	3	(Spain) Unai Núñez		(substituted on) 95'
DF	15	(Spain) Iñigo Lekue		(substituted on) 83'
MF	6	(Spain) Mikel Vesga		(substituted on) 81'
MF	16	(Spain) Oihan Sancet
FW	2	(Spain) Jon Morcillo	(yellow card) 110'	(substituted on) 106'
FW	7	(Spain) Ibai Gómez
FW	12	(Spain) Álex Berenguer		(substituted on) 81'
FW	20	(Spain) Asier Villalibre	(yellow card) 109'	(substituted on) 83'
Manager:
(Spain) Marcelino

Man of the Match:
Iñaki Williams (Athletic Bilbao)

Assistant referees:
Angel Nevado Rodríguez (Extremadura)
Javier Martínez Nicolás (Region of Murcia)
Fourth official:
José María Sánchez Martínez (Region of Murcia)
Reserve assistant referee:
Diego Barbero Sevilla (Andalusia)
Video assistant referee:
Alejandro Hernández Hernández (Las Palmas)
Assistant video assistant referee:
Guillermo Cuadra Fernández (Balearic Islands)

**Match rules**

- 90 minutes.
- 30 minutes of extra time if necessary.
- Penalty shoot-out if scores still level.
- Nine named substitutes.
- Maximum of five substitutions, with a sixth allowed in extra time. (Note: Each team was given only three opportunities to make substitutions, with a fourth opportunity in extra time, excluding substitutions made at half-time, before the start of extra time and at half-time in extra time.)

== See also ==
- 2020–21 Athletic Bilbao season
- 2020–21 FC Barcelona season
