= 2021 Copa del Rey final =

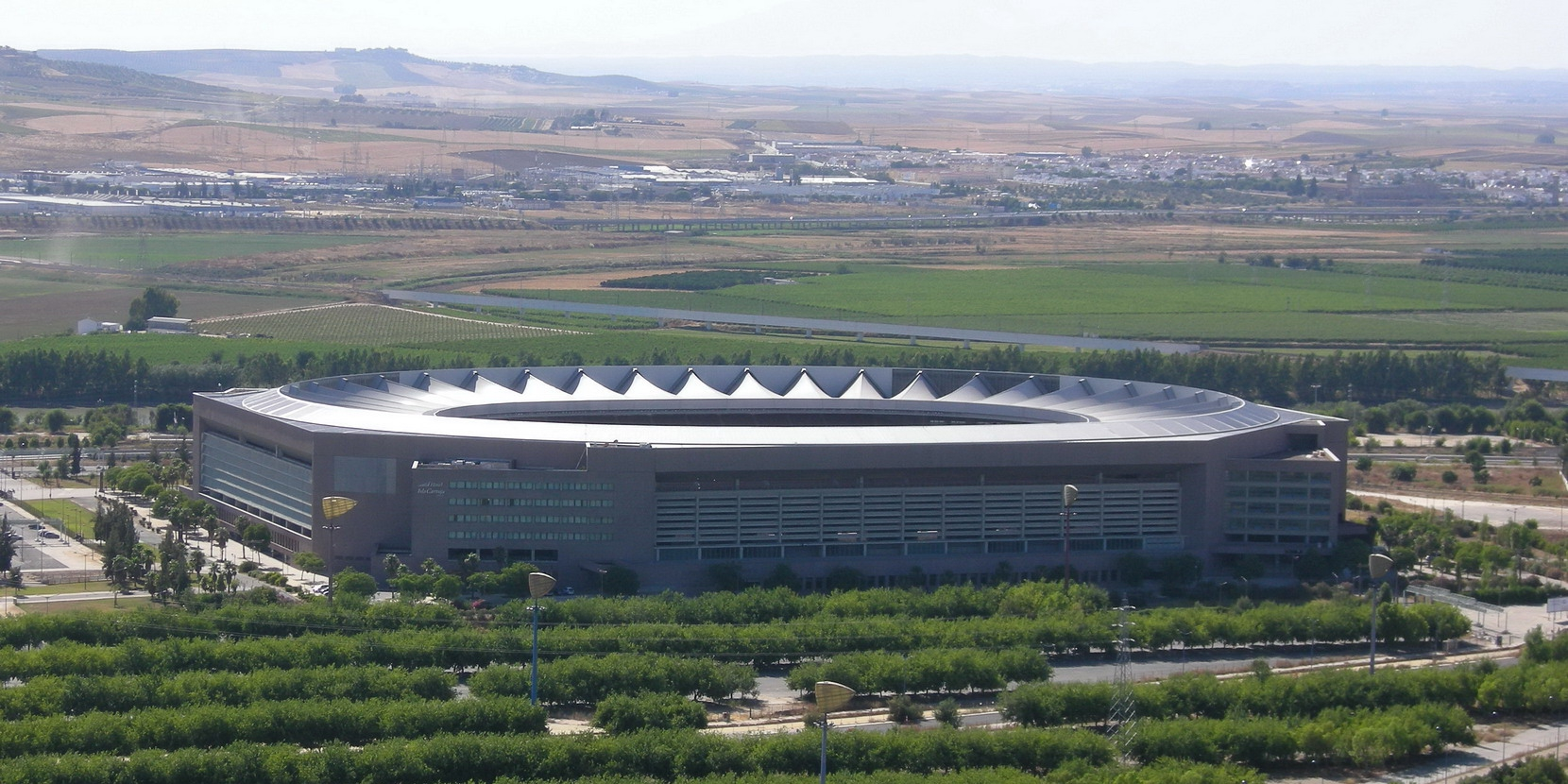
- La Cartuja in Seville hosted the final.
- Event: 2020–21 Copa del Rey
Athletic Bilbao	Barcelona
0	4
- Date: 17 April 2021
- Venue: La Cartuja, Seville
- Man of the Match: Lionel Messi (Barcelona)
- Referee: Juan Martínez Munuera (Valencian Community)
- Attendance: 0 (Note: The match was played behind closed doors due to the COVID-19 pandemic in Spain.)

The 2021 Copa del Rey final was a football match that decided the winner of the 2020–21 Copa del Rey, the 119th edition of Spain's primary football cup (including two seasons where two rival editions were played). The match was played on 17 April 2021 at the Estadio de La Cartuja in Seville between Athletic Bilbao and Barcelona.

Barcelona won the match 4–0 for a record-extending 31st Copa del Rey title.

== Background ==
The tournament was played amidst the backdrop of the COVID-19 pandemic in Spain which resulted in no crowds being allowed to be present in the stadiums. Barcelona's progress was characterised by narrow victories and dramatic comebacks, including being taken to extra time by part-time neighbours Cornellà after failing to score from two penalties, finding the net twice in the last 20 minutes to overcome second-tier Rayo Vallecano, and recovering from a 2–0 deficit with just three minutes remaining against Granada, taking the tie to extra time which ended in a 5–3 victory. They gave themselves a mountain to climb once again in the semi-final against Sevilla (a repeat of a recent final in 2018 and the only round of the competition with two legs), going down 2–0 at the Ramón Sánchez Pizjuán Stadium. In the return at Camp Nou, Ousmane Dembélé scored early and Marc-André ter Stegen saved a penalty to keep Barça hopes alive, but they were still behind with 90 minutes played; Gerard Piqué equalised in the fourth and last minute of stoppage time to level the tie on aggregate, and in extra time Martin Braithwaite found the winner to take his side into their 42nd final.

Athletic Bilbao's route to the event was comparably uncertain: they came from behind to overcome third-level Ibiza 2–1 with a last-minute goal, required a late winner again against Alcoyano (who had eliminated Real Madrid from the competition), and scored in the third minute of second-half stoppage time minute to take their quarter-final against Real Betis to extra time, before advancing with a perfect conversion rate in a penalty shoot-out. In the semi-finals against Levante they fell behind in both legs but found an equaliser (through Iñigo Martínez in the first match and a Raúl García penalty in the return) to again force extra time; the winner came from a deflected Álex Berenguer shot with eight minutes of the extended period remaining, reaching the final for the 39th time (one back in 1904 was never played and the cup awarded to the Bilbao side in a walkover).

At the time of the clubs qualifying for the 2021 event, the 2020 Copa del Rey final between Athletic Bilbao and Real Sociedad was still to be played, with its rescheduled date of 3 April 2021 giving the Biscay club a unique opportunity to win the competition twice inside a fortnight The delay also meant their current head coach Marcelino was the most recent manager to win the competition, having defeated Barcelona in the 2019 final while in charge of Valencia. That was the sixth consecutive final for the Blaugrana, and the first defeat for the Catalans since 2014; the sequence of finals is an outright record and the run of wins is a shared record along with Real Madrid in the 1900s and Athletic in the 1930s. When the 2020 final was eventually played, Athletic fell to a 1–0 defeat.

Barcelona and Athletic Bilbao had played each other in eight previous finals of the tournament; Barcelona won in 1920, 1942, 1953, 2009, 2012 and the most recent in 2015, and Athletic in 1932 and 1984. Their 2021 meeting made the fixture the most played in the history of Copa Del Rey finals, breaking a tied record with Athletic v Real Madrid (Note: Athletic's website claims they have met Real Madrid nine times, but this includes the 1902 Copa de la Coronación final, the status of which is disputed both as a Copa del Rey event and as a tournament entered by their club.) (the third pairing of the trio, El Clásico between Madrid and Barcelona, had been played seven times at that point).

The sided had also met frequently in Supercopa de España finals; indeed all of Athletic's four appearances (1983, 2009, 2015 and 2021) in that competition were against Barcelona. The most recent of these was exactly three months prior to the Copa del Rey final and played at the same venue (behind closed doors due to the pandemic), with Athletic winning 3–2 after extra time to claim the trophy with a winning goal from Iñaki Williams. By reaching the Copa del Rey final, both teams were assured qualification for the four-team 2022 Supercopa de España, giving Athletic the chance to defend their title.

In the 2020–21 La Liga meetings between the clubs (both played in January 2021 due to scheduling issues, two weeks either side of their Supercopa match), Barça had the edge with two wins (3–2 at San Mamés, 2–1 at Camp Nou, Lionel Messi scoring three of the goals) though the close scorelines in all three matches demonstrated the narrow margins between the sides overall.

== Road to the final ==
Athletic Bilbao		Round	Barcelona
Opponent	Result		Opponent	Result
Bye		First round	Bye
Bye		Second round	Bye
UD Ibiza	2–1 (A)	Round of 32	Cornellà	2–0 (a.e.t.) (A)
Alcoyano	2–1 (A)	Round of 16	Rayo Vallecano	2–1 (A)
Real Betis	1–1 (4–1 p) (A)	Quarter-finals	Granada	5–3 (a.e.t.) (A)
Levante	1–1 (H), 2–1 (a.e.t.) (A)	Semi-finals	Sevilla	0–2 (A), 3–0 (a.e.t.) (H)

Key: (H) = Home; (A) = Away

== Match ==
=== Details ===
17 April 2021
21:30 CEST

Athletic Bilbao	0–4	Barcelona
	Report	Griezmann 60'; De Jong 63'; Messi 68', 72'

La Cartuja, Seville
Attendance: 0
Referee: Juan Martínez Munuera (Valencian Community)

Athletic Bilbao	Barcelona

GK	1	(Spain) Unai Simón
RB	18	(Spain) Óscar de Marcos
CB	5	(Spain) Yeray Álvarez		(substituted off) 67'
CB	4	(Spain) Iñigo Martínez
LB	24	(Spain) Mikel Balenziaga
RM	12	(Spain) Álex Berenguer		(substituted off) 54'
CM	14	(Spain) Dani García	(yellow card) 39'
CM	8	(Spain) Unai López		(substituted off) 67'
LM	10	(Spain) Iker Muniain (c)		(substituted off) 46'
CF	9	(Spain) Iñaki Williams		(substituted off) 67'
CF	22	(Spain) Raúl García
Substitutes:
GK	13	(Spain) Jokin Ezkieta
DF	3	(Spain) Unai Núñez		(substituted on) 67'
DF	15	(Spain) Iñigo Lekue		(substituted on) 46'
DF	17	(Spain) Yuri Berchiche	(yellow card) 90'	(substituted on) 67'
DF	21	(Spain) Ander Capa
MF	6	(Spain) Mikel Vesga		(substituted on) 54'
MF	27	(Spain) Unai Vencedor
FW	2	(Spain) Jon Morcillo
FW	20	(Spain) Asier Villalibre		(substituted on) 67'
Manager:
(Spain) Marcelino

GK	1	(Germany) Marc-André ter Stegen
CB	28	(Spain) Óscar Mingueza	(substituted off) 87'
CB	3	(Spain) Gerard Piqué	(substituted off) 82'
CB	15	(France) Clément Lenglet
DM	5	(Spain) Sergio Busquets
RM	2	(United States) Sergiño Dest	(substituted off) 74'
CM	21	(Netherlands) Frenkie de Jong
CM	16	(Spain) Pedri	(substituted off) 81'
LM	18	(Spain) Jordi Alba
CF	10	(Argentina) Lionel Messi (c)
CF	7	(France) Antoine Griezmann	(substituted off) 88'
Substitutes:
GK	26	(Spain) Iñaki Peña
GK	36	(Spain) Arnau Tenas
DF	4	(Uruguay) Ronald Araújo	(substituted on) 82'
DF	20	(Spain) Sergi Roberto	(substituted on) 74'
DF	23	(France) Samuel Umtiti
MF	27	(Spain) Ilaix Moriba	(substituted on) 81'
FW	9	(Denmark) Martin Braithwaite	(substituted on) 87'
FW	11	(France) Ousmane Dembélé	(substituted on) 88'
FW	17	(Portugal) Francisco Trincão
Manager:
(Netherlands) Ronald Koeman

Man of the Match:
Lionel Messi (Barcelona)

Assistant referees:
Diego Barbero Sevilla (Andalusia)
Raúl Cabañero Martínez (Region of Murcia)
Fourth official:
Guillermo Cuadra Fernández (Balearic Islands)
Reserve assistant referee:
Miguel Martínez Munuera (Valencian Community)
Video assistant referee:
José Luis González González (Castile and León)
Assistant video assistant referee:
Ignacio Iglesias Villanueva (Galicia)

Match rules

- 90 minutes.
- 30 minutes of extra time if necessary.
- Penalty shoot-out if scores still level.
- Nine named substitutes.
- Maximum of five substitutions, with a sixth allowed in extra time. (Note: Each team was given only three opportunities to make substitutions, with a fourth opportunity in extra time, excluding substitutions made at half-time, before the start of extra time and at half-time in extra time.)

== See also ==
- Athletic–Barcelona clásico
