= 2020–21 Athletic Bilbao season =

Athletic Bilbao
2020–21 season
- President: Aitor Elizegi
- Head coach: Gaizka Garitano (until 3 January 2021); Marcelino (from 4 January 2021)
- Stadium: San Mamés
- La Liga: 10th
- Copa del Rey: Runners-up
- Supercopa de España: Winners
- Top goalscorer: League: Álex Berenguer (8); All: Raúl García (10)
- Biggest win: Athletic Bilbao 4–0 Real Betis; Cádiz 0–4 Athletic Bilbao; Athletic Bilbao 5–1 Getafe
- Biggest defeat: Athletic Bilbao 0–4 Barcelona
| Home colours | Away colours | Third colours |

The 2020–21 season was the 122nd season in the existence of Athletic Bilbao and the club's 90th consecutive season in the top flight of Spanish football. In addition to the domestic league, Athletic Bilbao participated in this season's editions of the Copa del Rey and the Supercopa de España. The season covered the period from 20 July 2020 to 30 June 2021, with the late start to the season due to the COVID-19 pandemic in Spain.

The season was the first since the 2011–12 without Aritz Aduriz, who retired in May 2020.

== Players ==
=== First-team squad ===
As of 1 February 2021

Note: Flags indicate national team as defined under FIFA eligibility rules; some limited exceptions apply. Players may hold more than one non-FIFA nationality.

| No. | Pos. | Nation | Player |
|---|---|---|---|
| 1 | GK | ESP | Unai Simón |
| 2 | FW | ESP | Jon Morcillo |
| 3 | DF | ESP | Unai Núñez |
| 4 | DF | ESP | Iñigo Martínez |
| 5 | DF | ESP | Yeray Álvarez |
| 6 | MF | ESP | Mikel Vesga |
| 7 | MF | ESP | Ibai Gómez |
| 8 | MF | ESP | Unai López |
| 9 | FW | ESP | Iñaki Williams |
| 10 | FW | ESP | Iker Muniain (captain) |
| 12 | FW | ESP | Álex Berenguer |
| 13 | GK | ESP | Jokin Ezkieta |
| 14 | MF | ESP | Dani García |

| No. | Pos. | Nation | Player |
|---|---|---|---|
| 15 | DF | ESP | Iñigo Lekue |
| 16 | MF | ESP | Oihan Sancet |
| 17 | DF | ESP | Yuri Berchiche |
| 18 | MF | ESP | Óscar de Marcos (2nd captain) |
| 19 | MF | ESP | Oier Zarraga |
| 20 | FW | ESP | Asier Villalibre |
| 21 | DF | ESP | Ander Capa |
| 22 | FW | ESP | Raúl García (3rd captain) |
| 23 | MF | ESP | Peru Nolaskoain |
| 24 | DF | ESP | Mikel Balenziaga |
| 25 | GK | ESP | Iago Herrerín |
| 26 | FW | ESP | Iñigo Vicente |
| 27 | MF | ESP | Unai Vencedor |

=== Reserve team ===
Note: Flags indicate national team as defined under FIFA eligibility rules; some limited exceptions apply. Players may hold more than one non-FIFA nationality.

| No. | Pos. | Nation | Player |
|---|---|---|---|
| 30 | FW | ESP | Nico Williams |
| 38 | DF | ESP | Aitor Paredes |

=== Out on loan ===
Note: Flags indicate national team as defined under FIFA eligibility rules; some limited exceptions apply. Players may hold more than one non-FIFA nationality.

| No. | Pos. | Nation | Player |
|---|---|---|---|
| — | DF | ESP | Daniel Vivian (at Mirandés until 30 June 2021) |
| — | DF | ESP | Jon Sillero (at Numancia until 30 June 2021) |

| No. | Pos. | Nation | Player |
|---|---|---|---|
| — | FW | ESP | Iñigo Córdoba (at Alavés until 30 June 2021) |
| — | FW | BIH | Kenan Kodro (at Valladolid until 30 June 2021) |

== Transfers ==
=== In ===
| Date | Player | From | Type | Fee | Ref |
|---|---|---|---|---|---|
| 30 June 2020 | (Romania) Cristian Ganea | (Romania) Viitorul Constanța | Loan return | | |
| 8 August 2020 | (Spain) Peru Nolaskoain | Deportivo La Coruña | Loan return | | |
| 24 August 2020 | (Spain) Andoni López | Elche | Loan return | | |
| 2 October 2020 | (Spain) Álex Berenguer | (Italy) Torino | Transfer | €10.5M | |

=== Out ===
| Date | Player | To | Type | Fee | Ref |
|---|---|---|---|---|---|
| 20 May 2020 | (Spain) Aritz Aduriz | Retired | | | |
| 20 July 2020 | (Spain) Beñat | Unattached | End of contract | | |
| 14 August 2020 | (Romania) Cristian Ganea | (Greece) Aris | Transfer | Free | |
| 1 September 2020 | (Spain) Andoni López | Logroñés | Transfer | Free | |
| 21 September 2020 | (Spain) Mikel San José | (England) Birmingham City | Transfer | Free | |
| 2 October 2020 | (Spain) Gaizka Larrazabal | Zaragoza | Transfer | Free | |
| 28 January 2021 | (Bosnia and Herzegovina) Kenan Kodro | Valladolid | Loan | | |

== Pre-season and friendlies ==
Win Draw Loss

| 29 August 2020 Friendly | UD Logroñés | 3–1 | Athletic Bilbao | Logroño, Spain |
| 20:00 CEST (UTC+2) | García Pérez 38' (pen.); Sáenz 69'; Andy 81' | Report | Muniain 54' | Stadium: Estadio Las Gaunas; Attendance: 0 Referee: Miguel Sesma Espinosa |

| 2 September 2020 Friendly | Athletic Bilbao | 2–1 | Alavés | Lezama, Spain |
| 11:00 CEST (UTC+2) | Muniain 29' (pen.); Morcillo 35' | Report | Deyverson 50' | Stadium: Lezama Facilities; Attendance: 0 Referee: Ekhiotz Sánchez Asla |

| 4 September 2020 Friendly | Oviedo | 2–2 | Athletic Bilbao | Oviedo, Spain |
| 12:00 CEST (UTC+2) | Capa 38' (o.g.); Obeng 60' | Report | Zarraga 43'; Villalibre 56' | Stadium: Estadio Carlos Tartiere; Attendance: 0 Referee: Leandro Carbajales Gómez |

| 5 September 2020 Friendly | Athletic Bilbao | 2–2 | Eibar | Lezama, Spain |
| 11:30 CEST (UTC+2) | R. García 10'; Morcillo 28' | Report | Quique 71'; Ewan 87' (o.g.) | Stadium: Lezama Facilities; Attendance: 0 Referee: Gorka Etayo Herrera |

| 18 September 2020 Friendly | Sevilla | 2–1 | Athletic Bilbao | San Pedro del Pinatar, Spain |
| 17:30 CEST (UTC+2) | Escudero 28'; En-Nesyri 55' | Report | Muniain 35' (pen.) | Stadium: Pinatar Arena; Attendance: 0 Referee: Juan Francisco Roca Robles |

| 18 September 2020 Friendly | Sevilla | 0–1 | Athletic Bilbao | San Pedro del Pinatar, Spain |
| 19:30 CEST (UTC+2) | | Report | Villalibre 64' | Stadium: Pinatar Arena; Attendance: 0 Referee: Fulgencio Madrid Martínez |

| 8 October 2020 XLVI Trofeo Ciudad de Valladolid | Valladolid | 2–2 (a.e.t.) (2–4 p) | Athletic Bilbao | Valladolid, Spain |
| 17:30 CEST (UTC+2) | Guardiola 79'; Kuki 88' | Report | Morcillo 42'; Zarraga 74' | Stadium: Estadio José Zorrilla; Attendance: 0 Referee: Fernando Román Román |
| | Penalties |
| | Rubio (penalty scored); Plano (penalty scored); Pérez (penalty missed); Kuki (penalty missed) | | (penalty scored) López; (penalty scored) Zarraga; (penalty scored) Vencedor; (penalty scored) Vicente |

== Competitions ==
=== Overall record ===
| Competition | First match | Last match | Starting round | Final position | Record | | | | | | | |
| Competition | First match | Last match | Starting round | Final position | Pld | W | D | L | GF | GA | GD | Win % |
|---|---|---|---|---|---|---|---|---|---|---|---|---|
| La Liga | 12 September 2020 | 22 May 2021 | Matchday 1 | 10th | 38 | 11 | 13 | 14 | 46 | 42 | +4 | 28.95 |
| Copa del Rey | 21 January 2021 | 17 April 2021 | Round of 32 | Runners-up | 6 | 3 | 2 | 1 | 8 | 9 | −1 | 50.00 |
| Supercopa | 14 January 2021 | 17 January 2021 | Semi-finals | Winners | 2 | 2 | 0 | 0 | 5 | 3 | +2 | 100.00 |
| Total | | | | | 46 | 16 | 15 | 15 | 59 | 54 | +5 | 34.78 |

Source: Soccerway

=== La Liga ===
==== League table ====
| Pos | Team | Pld | W | D | L | GF | GA | GD | Pts |
|---|---|---|---|---|---|---|---|---|---|
| 8 | Celta Vigo | 38 | 14 | 11 | 13 | 55 | 57 | −2 | 53 |
| 9 | Granada | 38 | 13 | 7 | 18 | 47 | 65 | −18 | 46 (Note: Granada finished ahead of Athletic Bilbao on head-to-head goal difference: Granada 2–0 Athletic Bilbao, Athletic Bilbao 2–1 Granada.) |
| 10 | Athletic Bilbao | 38 | 11 | 13 | 14 | 46 | 42 | +4 | 46 |
| 11 | Osasuna | 38 | 11 | 11 | 16 | 37 | 48 | −11 | 44 (Note: Osasuna finished ahead of Cádiz on head-to-head points: Cádiz 0–2 Osasuna, Osasuna 3–2 Cádiz.) |
| 12 | Cádiz | 38 | 11 | 11 | 16 | 36 | 58 | −22 | 44 |

Source: La Liga
Rules for classification: 1) Points; 2) Head-to-head points; 3) Head-to-head goal difference; 4) Goal difference; 5) Goals scored; 6) Fair-play points (Note: Head-to-head record is used only after all the matches between the teams in question have been played)

==== Results summary ====
| Overall | | | | | | | | Home | | | | | | Away | | | | | |
| Pld | W | D | L | GF | GA | GD | Pts | W | D | L | GF | GA | GD | W | D | L | GF | GA | GD |
|---|---|---|---|---|---|---|---|---|---|---|---|---|---|---|---|---|---|---|---|
| 38 | 11 | 13 | 14 | 46 | 42 | +4 | 46 | 8 | 6 | 5 | 29 | 19 | +10 | 3 | 7 | 9 | 17 | 23 | −6 |

Source: La Liga

==== Results by round ====
| Round | 1 | 2 | 3 | 4 | 5 | 6 | 7 | 8 | 9 | 10 | 11 | 12 | 13 | 14 | 15 | 16 | 17 | 18 | 19 | 20 | 21 | 22 | 23 | 24 | 25 | 26 | 27 | 28 | 29 | 30 | 31 | 32 | 33 | 34 | 35 | 36 | 37 | 38 |
|---|---|---|---|---|---|---|---|---|---|---|---|---|---|---|---|---|---|---|---|---|---|---|---|---|---|---|---|---|---|---|---|---|---|---|---|---|---|---|
| Ground | A | H | A | H | A | H | A | H | A | H | A | H | A | H | A | H | H | A | A | H | A | H | A | H | A | H | A | H | A | H | A | H | H | A | H | A | H | A |
| Result | L | L | W | L | L | W | L | W | L | W | D | L | D | W | D | L | W | L | L | W | L | D | W | D | D | W | D | D | D | D | D | W | D | W | D | L | L | L |
| Position | 19 | 19 | 14 | 15 | 19 | 14 | 16 | 11 | 14 | 8 | 9 | 14 | 13 | 10 | 10 | 12 | 9 | 12 | 12 | 9 | 11 | 11 | 10 | 11 | 10 | 8 | 10 | 9 | 10 | 11 | 10 | 9 | 9 | 9 | 9 | 9 | 9 | 10 |

Source: La Liga
A = Away; H = Home; W = Win; D = Draw; L = Loss

==== Matches ====
The league fixtures were announced on 31 August 2020.

| 12 September 2020 1 | Granada | 2–0 | Athletic Bilbao | Granada |
| 18:30 CEST (UTC+2) | Herrera (yellow card) 10', (goal) 49'; Germán (yellow card) 45'; Milla 53'; Gonalons (yellow card) 90+2' | Report | Morcillo (yellow card) 15'; Martínez (yellow card) 52'; López (yellow card) 72'; Yeray (yellow card) 84' | Stadium: Nuevo Los Cármenes; Attendance: 0 (Note: The match was played behind closed doors due to the COVID-19 pandemic in Spain.); Referee: Antonio Mateu Lahoz |

| 27 September 2020 3 | Eibar | 1–2 | Athletic Bilbao | Eibar |
| 14:00 CEST (UTC+2) | Kike 48'; Diop (yellow card) 90+10' | Report | López 40', 87' | Stadium: Ipurua; Attendance: 0 Referee: Adrián Cordero Vega |

| 1 October 2020 4 | Athletic Bilbao | 0–1 | Cádiz | Bilbao |
| 19:00 CEST (UTC+2) | Villalibre (yellow card) 54'; Kodro (yellow card) 79'; Martínez (yellow card) 83' | Report | Akapo (yellow card) 18' (yellow-red card) 48'; Fali (yellow card) 41'; López 57' (o.g.); Negredo (yellow card) 63' (yellow-red card) 70' | Stadium: San Mamés; Attendance: 0 Referee: Pablo González Fuertes |

| 4 October 2020 5 | Alavés | 1–0 | Athletic Bilbao | Vitoria-Gasteiz |
| 14:00 CEST (UTC+2) | Ely 74'; Duarte (yellow card) 85' (yellow-red card) 86' | Report | D. García (yellow card) 19'; Núñez (yellow card) 62'; Martínez (yellow card) 64' | Stadium: Mendizorrotza; Attendance: 0 Referee: José María Sánchez Martínez |

| 18 October 2020 6 | Athletic Bilbao | 2–0 | Levante | Bilbao |
| 14:00 CEST (UTC+2) | Álvarez (yellow card) 42'; Capa (yellow card) 44'; López (yellow card) 64'; Berenguer 68'; I. Williams 79' | Report | Vezo (yellow card) 33' | Stadium: San Mamés; Attendance: 0 Referee: Javier Alberola Rojas |

| 24 October 2020 7 | Osasuna | 1–0 | Athletic Bilbao | Pamplona |
| 18:30 CEST (UTC+2) | D. García (yellow card) 16'; Oier (yellow card) 54'; Vidal (yellow card) 63'; Ru. García 81' (pen.) | Report | Álvarez (yellow card) 24'; Ra. García (yellow card) 26' | Stadium: El Sadar Stadium; Attendance: 0 Referee: Guillermo Cuadra Fernández |

| 31 October 2020 8 | Athletic Bilbao | 2–1 | Sevilla | Bilbao |
| 16:15 CET (UTC+1) | R. García (yellow card) 30'; Martínez (yellow card) 54'; I. Williams (yellow card) 62'; Muniain 76'; Sancet 86'; López (yellow card) 90'; Berchiche (yellow card) 90+3' | Report | En-Nesyri 9'; Fernando (yellow card) 26'; Koundé (yellow card) 63'; Acuña (yellow card) 69'; Navas (yellow card) 88'; Diego Carlos (yellow card) 90+1' | Stadium: San Mamés; Attendance: 0 Referee: Carlos del Cerro Grande |

| 8 November 2020 9 | Valladolid | 2–1 | Athletic Bilbao | Valladolid |
| 18:30 CET (UTC+1) | Orellana 19' (pen.); Hervías (yellow card) 38'; Marcos André 48'; Alcaraz (yellow card) 66'; Masip (yellow card) 71'; García (yellow card) 90+1' | Report | Simón (yellow card) 17'; Muniain (yellow card) 66'; I. Williams 86' (pen.) | Stadium: Estadio José Zorrilla; Attendance: 0 Referee: César Soto Grado |

| 23 November 2020 10 | Athletic Bilbao | 4–0 | Real Betis | Bilbao |
| 21:00 CET (UTC+1) | Ruiz 9' (o.g.); Capa 33'; Muniain 59'; Berenguer 68' | Report | | Stadium: San Mamés; Attendance: 0 Referee: Javier Alberola Rojas |

| 29 November 2020 11 | Getafe | 1–1 | Athletic Bilbao | Getafe |
| 16:15 CET (UTC+1) | Hernández (yellow card) 61'; Cabaco (yellow card) 71'; Ángel 75' | Report | Villalibre 9'; Capa (yellow card) 14'; Vesga (yellow card) 48'; Morcillo (yellow card) 88'; Martínez (yellow card) 88' | Stadium: Coliseum Alfonso Pérez; Attendance: 0 Referee: Mario Melero López |

| 4 December 2020 12 | Athletic Bilbao | 0–2 | Celta Vigo | Bilbao |
| 21:00 CET (UTC+1) | Núñez (yellow card) 26'; Vesga (yellow card) 84' | Report | Murillo (yellow card) 53'; Mallo 61'; Aspas 78' | Stadium: San Mamés; Attendance: 0 Referee: José Juan Vázquez |

| 12 December 2020 13 | Valencia | 2–2 | Athletic Bilbao | Valencia |
| 14:00 CET (UTC+1) | Soler 26' (pen.); Gómez (yellow card) 36'; Vallejo 83'; Jason (yellow card) 90+1' | Report | Vesga (yellow card) 31'; Villalibre 55'; D. García (yellow card) 61'; López (yellow card) 73'; R. García 79' (pen.), (yellow card) 90+4'; Álvarez (yellow card) 82'; Berenguer (yellow card) 84' | Stadium: Mestalla; Attendance: 0 Referee: Carlos del Cerro Grande |

| 15 December 2020 19 | Real Madrid | 3–1 | Athletic Bilbao | Madrid |
| 22:00 CET (UTC+1) | Vázquez (yellow card) 42'; Kroos 45+1'; Benzema 74', 90+2' | Report | R. García (yellow card) 8' (yellow-red card) 13'; Capa 52'; Yeray (yellow card) 80' | Stadium: Alfredo Di Stéfano; Attendance: 0 Referee: Jesús Gil Manzano |
Note: The match originally scheduled for 20 January 2021, but brought forward due to the teams involvement in the Supercopa de España.

| 18 December 2020 14 | Athletic Bilbao | 2–0 | Huesca | Bilbao |
| 21:00 CET (UTC+1) | Kodro 86' (pen.); Núñez 90+2' | Report | Pulido (yellow card) 36' (yellow-red card) 86'; Doumbia (yellow card) 67' | Stadium: San Mamés; Attendance: 0 Referee: Valentín Pizarro Gómez |

| 22 December 2020 15 | Villarreal | 1–1 | Athletic Bilbao | Villarreal |
| 22:00 CET (UTC+1) | Gerard (yellow card) 36'; Pino 75' | Report | I. Williams 19'; Berenguer (yellow card) 71' | Stadium: Estadio de la Cerámica; Attendance: 0 Referee: David Medié Jiménez |

| 31 December 2020 16 | Athletic Bilbao | 0–1 | Real Sociedad | Bilbao |
| 14:00 CET (UTC+1) | Vencedor (yellow card) 23'; Berchiche (yellow card) 55'; Núñez (yellow card) 62'; Martínez (yellow card) 81'; Capa (yellow card) 84' | Report | Portu 5'; Guevara (yellow card) 8'; Barrenetxea (yellow card) 21'; Merino (yellow card) 39'; Zubeldia (yellow card) 67' | Stadium: San Mamés; Attendance: 0 Referee: José María Sánchez Martínez |

| 3 January 2021 17 | Athletic Bilbao | 1–0 | Elche | Bilbao |
| 14:00 CET (UTC+1) | Muniain 25'; Vencedor (yellow card) 36'; Berchiche (yellow card) 50' | Report | Barragán (yellow card) 44' | Stadium: San Mamés; Attendance: 0 Referee: Mario Melero López |

| 6 January 2021 2 | Athletic Bilbao | 2–3 | Barcelona | Bilbao |
| 21:00 CET (UTC+1) | I. Williams 3'; Vesga (yellow card) 27'; D. García (yellow card) 70'; Muniain 90' | Report | Pedri 14'; Messi 38', 62'; Lenglet (yellow card) 57' | Stadium: San Mamés; Attendance: 0 Referee: Carlos del Cerro Grande |
Note: Match originally scheduled for 19 September 2020, but postponed due the delayed conclusion of the knockout phase of the UEFA Champions League.

| 25 January 2021 20 | Athletic Bilbao | 5–1 | Getafe | Bilbao |
| 21:00 CET (UTC+1) | Núñez (yellow card) 9'; R. García 12', 61', (yellow card) 17'; D. García (yellow card) 40'; Yeray 50'; Vencedor (yellow card) 57'; Berenguer 75'; De Marcos 82' | Report | Cucurella 1'; Maksimović (yellow card) 8'; Mata (penalty missed) 29', (yellow card) 50'; Etxeita (yellow card) 57'; Djené (yellow card) 79' | Stadium: San Mamés; Attendance: 0 Referee: Adrián Cordero Vega |

| 31 January 2021 21 | Barcelona | 2–1 | Athletic Bilbao | Barcelona |
| 21:00 CET (UTC+1) | Messi 20'; De Jong (yellow card) 47'; Alba (yellow card) 51'; Griezmann 74' | Report | R. García (yellow card) 32'; Yeray (yellow card) 39'; Alba 49' (o.g.); Capa (yellow card) 77' | Stadium: Camp Nou; Attendance: 0 Referee: Antonio Mateu Lahoz |

| 7 February 2021 22 | Athletic Bilbao | 1–1 | Valencia | Bilbao |
| 16:15 CET (UTC+1) | Guillamón 43' (o.g.); Berenguer (yellow card) 51'; Martínez (yellow card) 74' | Report | Gabriel 65'; Soler (yellow card) 79' | Stadium: San Mamés; Attendance: 0 Referee: José Luis Munuera Montero |

| 15 February 2021 23 | Cádiz | 0–4 | Athletic Bilbao | Cádiz |
| 21:00 CET (UTC+1) | Cala (yellow card) 33'; Fali (yellow card) 47'; Šaponjić (yellow card) 90+1' | Report | Berenguer 4', 29'; López 15'; Núñez (yellow card) 19'; I. Williams 52'; Vesga (yellow card) 70' | Stadium: Ramón de Carranza; Attendance: 0 Referee: Alejandro Hernández Hernández |

| 21 February 2021 24 | Athletic Bilbao | 1–1 | Villarreal | Bilbao |
| 21:00 CET (UTC+1) | Berenguer 44'; D. García (yellow card) 53'; López (yellow card) 86' | Report | Gerard 16'; Capoue (yellow card) 40'; Foyth (yellow card) 55' | Stadium: San Mamés; Attendance: 0 Referee: Carlos del Cerro Grande |

| 26 February 2021 25 | Levante | 1–1 | Athletic Bilbao | Valencia |
| 21:00 CET (UTC+1) | Roger 33' (pen.); Coke (yellow card) 41'; Son (yellow card) 47'; Vukčević (yellow card) 56' | Report | R. García 56' (pen.); Morcillo (yellow card) 90+4' | Stadium: Ciutat de València; Attendance: 0 Referee: Isidro Díaz De Mera Escuderos |

| 7 March 2021 26 | Athletic Bilbao | 2–1 | Granada | Bilbao |
| 21:00 CET (UTC+1) | Villalibre 3'; D. García (yellow card) 28'; Vencedor (yellow card) 68'; R. García (penalty missed) 71'; Berenguer 90+1' | Report | Herrera (yellow card) 59'; Molina 78'; Díaz (yellow card) 90+5' | Stadium: San Mamés; Attendance: 0 Referee: Juan Martínez Munuera |

| 10 March 2021 18 | Atlético Madrid | 2–1 | Athletic Bilbao | Madrid |
| 19:00 CET (UTC+1) | Felipe (yellow card) 43'; Llorente 45+2'; Suárez 51' (pen.); Lodi (yellow card) 90+4' | Report | Muniain 21'; De Marcos (yellow card) 38'; Vesga (yellow card) 41' | Stadium: Wanda Metropolitano; Attendance: 0 Referee: Jesús Gil Manzano |
Note: Match originally scheduled for 9 January 2021, but postponed due to Storm Filomena causing the closure of Madrid–Barajas Airport.

| 14 March 2021 27 | Celta Vigo | 0–0 | Athletic Bilbao | Vigo |
| 14:00 CET (UTC+1) | Mina (yellow card) 45'; Kevin (yellow card) 63'; Murillo (yellow card) 70' | Report | Lekue (yellow card) 41' | Stadium: Balaídos; Attendance: 0 Referee: Santiago Jaime Latre |

| 20 March 2021 28 | Athletic Bilbao | 1–1 | Eibar | Bilbao |
| 14:00 CET (UTC+1) | Berchiche 9'; Martínez (yellow card) 56' | Report | Kike 17'; Pozo (yellow card) 74' | Stadium: San Mamés; Attendance: 0 Referee: Valentín Pizarro Gómez |

| 7 April 2021 29 | Real Sociedad | 1–1 | Athletic Bilbao | San Sebastián |
| 21:00 CEST (UTC+2) | Muñoz (yellow card) 12'; Zubeldia (yellow card) 38'; Zubimendi (yellow card) 84'; López 89' | Report | D. García (yellow card) 22'; Villalibre 85' | Stadium: Anoeta; Attendance: 0 Referee: José María Sánchez Martínez |

| 10 April 2021 30 | Athletic Bilbao | 0–0 | Alavés | Bilbao |
| 16:15 CEST (UTC+2) | Vesga (yellow card) 2'; Capa (yellow card) 90+1' | Report | Lejeune (yellow card) 46'; García (yellow card) 90+2' | Stadium: San Mamés; Attendance: 0 Referee: Mario Melero López |

| 21 April 2021 31 | Real Betis | 0–0 | Athletic Bilbao | Seville |
| 20:00 CEST (UTC+2) | Fekir (red card) 11'; Rodríguez (yellow card) 56'; Guardado (yellow card) 82'; Bravo (yellow card) 90' | Report | De Marcos (yellow card) 43'; Núñez (yellow card) 90+5' | Stadium: Benito Villamarín; Attendance: 0 Referee: David Medié Jiménez |

| 25 April 2021 32 | Athletic Bilbao | 2–1 | Atlético Madrid | Bilbao |
| 21:00 CEST (UTC+2) | Berenguer 8'; Sancet (yellow card) 44'; Vencedor (yellow card) 61'; D. García (yellow card) 66'; Martínez 86'; López (yellow card) 90+2' | Report | Llorente (yellow card) 11'; Savić 77'; Torreira (yellow card) 81' | Stadium: San Mamés; Attendance: 0 Referee: Pablo González Fuertes |

| 28 April 2021 33 | Athletic Bilbao | 2–2 | Valladolid | Bilbao |
| 19:00 CEST (UTC+2) | Morcillo 14'; Sancet (yellow card) 61'; R. García 76' | Report | Orellana 70'; Weissman 85'; El Yamiq (yellow card) 90+1' | Stadium: San Mamés; Attendance: 0 Referee: Adrián Cordero Vega |

| 3 May 2021 34 | Sevilla | 0–1 | Athletic Bilbao | Seville |
| 21:00 CEST (UTC+2) | Diego Carlos (yellow card) 35' | Report | I. Williams 90' | Stadium: Ramón Sánchez Pizjuán; Attendance: 0 Referee: Jesús Gil Manzano |

| 8 May 2021 35 | Athletic Bilbao | 2–2 | Osasuna | Bilbao |
| 21:00 CEST (UTC+2) | Morcillo 1'; Vencedor (yellow card) 50'; Sancet 62' | Report | Brašanac 12', (yellow card) 90+2'; Torró (yellow card) 26'; Budimir 89' | Stadium: San Mamés; Attendance: 0 Referee: Valentín Pizarro Gómez |

| 12 May 2021 36 | Huesca | 1–0 | Athletic Bilbao | Huesca |
| 20:00 CEST (UTC+2) | Sandro 61' | Report | Simón (yellow card) 62' | Stadium: El Alcoraz; Attendance: 0 Referee: Jorge Figueroa Vázquez |

| 16 May 2021 37 | Athletic Bilbao | 0–1 | Real Madrid | Bilbao |
| 18:30 CEST (UTC+2) | Berenguer (yellow card) 14'; R. García (yellow card) 79', (red card) 89'; Martínez (yellow card) 80' | Report | Nacho 68', (yellow card) 82'; Valverde (yellow card) 90+1' | Stadium: San Mamés; Attendance: 0 Referee: Antonio Mateu Lahoz |

| 22 May 2021 38 | Elche | 2–0 | Athletic Bilbao | Elche |
| 18:00 CEST (UTC+2) | Boyé 28'; Mfulu (yellow card) 33'; Piatti (yellow card) 58'; Guti 73', (yellow card) 74' | Report | | Stadium: Martínez Valero; Attendance: 0 Referee: Carlos del Cerro Grande |

=== Copa del Rey ===
| 21 January 2021 Round of 32 | UD Ibiza | 1–2 | Athletic Bilbao | Ibiza |
| 19:00 CET (UTC+1) | Pérez 12'; González (yellow card) 37'; Goldar (yellow card) 53'; Sibo (yellow card) 72' | Report | R. García 52'; D. García (yellow card) 75'; Núñez 90+1' | Stadium: Can Misses; Referee: Pablo González Fuertes |

| 28 January 2021 Round of 16 | Alcoyano | 1–2 | Athletic Bilbao | Alcoy |
| 21:00 CET (UTC+1) | Carbonell 39'; Jony (yellow card) 51'; Diakité (yellow card) 72'; López (yellow card) 88' | Report | Vesga (yellow card) 45'; Villalibre 53'; I. Williams 78' | Stadium: El Collao; Referee: David Medié Jiménez |

| 4 February 2021 Quarter-finals | Real Betis | 1–1 (a.e.t.) (1–4 p) | Athletic Bilbao | Seville |
| 21:00 CET (UTC+1) | Ruibal (yellow card) 55'; Carvalho (yellow card) 83'; Juanmi 84' | Report | Berchiche (yellow card) 39'; Yeray (yellow card) 42'; D. García (yellow card) 48'; Martínez (yellow card) 53'; Lekue (yellow card) 72'; R. García (yellow card) 83', (goal) 90+4' | Stadium: Benito Villamarín; Referee: Alejandro Hernández Hernández |
| | Penalties |
| | Mandi (penalty scored); Canales (penalty missed); Juanmi (penalty missed) | | (penalty scored) R. García; (penalty scored) I. Williams; (penalty scored) Morcillo; (penalty scored) Berchiche |

| 11 February 2021 Semi-finals; First leg | Athletic Bilbao | 1–1 | Levante | Bilbao |
| 21:00 CET (UTC+1) | Martínez (yellow card) 19', (goal) 58'; R. García (yellow card) 31' | Report | Melero 26'; Coke (yellow card) 35' | Stadium: San Mamés; Referee: Jesús Gil Manzano |

| 4 March 2021 Semi-finals; Second leg | Levante | 1–2 (a.e.t.) (2–3 agg.) | Athletic Bilbao | Valencia |
| 21:00 CET (UTC+1) | Roger 17'; Duarte (yellow card) 28'; Rochina (yellow card) 76' | Report | R. García 30' (pen.); Núñez (yellow card) 42'; López (yellow card) 55'; De Marcos (yellow card) 105+1'; Berenguer 112' | Stadium: Ciutat de València; Referee: Carlos del Cerro Grande |

| 17 April 2021 Final | Athletic Bilbao | 0–4 | Barcelona | Seville |
| 21:30 CEST (UTC+2) | D. García (yellow card) 39'; Berchiche (yellow card) 90' | Report | Griezmann 60'; De Jong 63'; Messi 68', 72' | Stadium: La Cartuja; Attendance: 0 Referee: Juan Martínez Munuera |

=== Supercopa ===
The draw was held on 17 December 2020.

| 14 January 2021 Semi-finals | Real Madrid | 1–2 | Athletic Bilbao | Málaga |
| 21:00 CET (UTC+1) | Vázquez (yellow card) 37'; Benzema 73'; Kroos (yellow card) 83' | Report | R. García 18', 38' (pen.); Capa (yellow card) 57'; D. García (yellow card) 84'; Simón (yellow card) 88' | Stadium: La Rosaleda; Attendance: 0 Referee: Juan Martínez Munuera |

| 17 January 2021 Final | Barcelona | 2–3 (a.e.t.) | Athletic Bilbao | Seville |
| 21:00 CET (UTC+1) | Lenglet (yellow card) 11'; Griezmann 40', 77'; Alba (yellow card) 114'; Messi (red card) 120+1' | Report | De Marcos 42'; D. García (yellow card) 67'; Villalibre 90', (yellow card) 109'; I. Williams 93'; Morcillo (yellow card) 110' | Stadium: La Cartuja; Attendance: 0 Referee: Jesús Gil Manzano |

== Statistics ==
=== Appearances and goals ===
Last updated on 22 May 2021. Does not include the 2020 Copa del Rey Final, delayed until April 2021 and counted in the 2020–21 season in some resources – these stats are recorded under the 2019–20 Athletic Bilbao season article.

| No. | Pos | Nat | Player | Total | | La Liga | | Copa del Rey | | Supercopa de España | |
| No. | Pos | Nat | Player | Apps | Goals | Apps | Goals | Apps | Goals | Apps | Goals |
Goalkeepers
| 1 | GK | (Spain) ESP | Unai Simón | 43 | 0 | 37 | 0 | 4 | 0 | 2 | 0 |
| 13 | GK | (Spain) ESP | Jokin Ezkieta | 3 | 0 | 1 | 0 | 2 | 0 | 0 | 0 |
| 25 | GK | (Spain) ESP | Iago Herrerín | 0 | 0 | 0 | 0 | 0 | 0 | 0 | 0 |
Defenders
| 3 | DF | (Spain) ESP | Unai Núñez | 30 | 2 | 23+1 | 1 | 3+1 | 1 | 1+1 | 0 |
| 4 | DF | (Spain) ESP | Iñigo Martínez | 33 | 2 | 28 | 1 | 3 | 1 | 2 | 0 |
| 5 | DF | (Spain) ESP | Yeray Álvarez | 30 | 1 | 22+1 | 1 | 6 | 0 | 1 | 0 |
| 15 | DF | (Spain) ESP | Iñigo Lekue | 24 | 0 | 5+13 | 0 | 3+1 | 0 | 0+2 | 0 |
| 17 | DF | (Spain) ESP | Yuri Berchiche | 29 | 1 | 21+2 | 1 | 4+2 | 0 | 0 | 0 |
| 18 | DF | (Spain) ESP | Óscar de Marcos | 31 | 2 | 17+8 | 1 | 4 | 0 | 2 | 1 |
| 21 | DF | (Spain) ESP | Ander Capa | 34 | 2 | 25+3 | 2 | 1+3 | 0 | 2 | 0 |
| 23 | DF | (Spain) ESP | Peru Nolaskoain | 0 | 0 | 0 | 0 | 0 | 0 | 0 | 0 |
| 24 | DF | (Spain) ESP | Mikel Balenziaga | 28 | 0 | 17+6 | 0 | 2+1 | 0 | 2 | 0 |
Midfielders
| 6 | MF | (Spain) ESP | Mikel Vesga | 38 | 0 | 20+10 | 0 | 4+2 | 0 | 0+2 | 0 |
| 8 | MF | (Spain) ESP | Unai López | 31 | 3 | 15+11 | 3 | 3+2 | 0 | 0 | 0 |
| 14 | MF | (Spain) ESP | Dani García | 35 | 0 | 21+6 | 0 | 3+3 | 0 | 2 | 0 |
| 16 | MF | (Spain) ESP | Oihan Sancet | 26 | 2 | 11+13 | 2 | 2 | 0 | 0 | 0 |
| 19 | MF | (Spain) ESP | Oier Zarraga | 5 | 0 | 1+4 | 0 | 0 | 0 | 0 | 0 |
| 22 | MF | (Spain) ESP | Raúl García | 42 | 10 | 21+13 | 5 | 4+2 | 3 | 2 | 2 |
| 27 | MF | (Spain) ESP | Unai Vencedor | 34 | 0 | 19+9 | 0 | 2+2 | 0 | 2 | 0 |
Forwards
| 2 | FW | (Spain) ESP | Jon Morcillo | 36 | 2 | 16+14 | 2 | 2+2 | 0 | 0+2 | 0 |
| 7 | FW | (Spain) ESP | Ibai Gómez | 13 | 0 | 4+9 | 0 | 0 | 0 | 0 | 0 |
| 9 | FW | (Spain) ESP | Iñaki Williams | 46 | 8 | 27+11 | 6 | 3+3 | 1 | 2 | 1 |
| 10 | FW | (Spain) ESP | Iker Muniain | 35 | 5 | 23+5 | 5 | 3+2 | 0 | 2 | 0 |
| 12 | FW | (Spain) ESP | Álex Berenguer | 43 | 9 | 27+8 | 8 | 5+1 | 1 | 0+2 | 0 |
| 20 | FW | (Spain) ESP | Asier Villalibre | 43 | 6 | 16+19 | 4 | 3+3 | 1 | 0+2 | 1 |
| 26 | FW | (Spain) ESP | Iñigo Vicente | 3 | 0 | 0+3 | 0 | 0 | 0 | 0 | 0 |
| 30 | FW | (Spain) ESP | Nico Williams | 2 | 0 | 0+2 | 0 | 0 | 0 | 0 | 0 |
Players who have made an appearance this season but have left the club
| 11 | FW | (Spain) ESP | Iñigo Córdoba | 3 | 0 | 1+2 | 0 | 0 | 0 | 0 | 0 |
| 19 | FW | (Bosnia and Herzegovina) BIH | Kenan Kodro | 3 | 1 | 0+3 | 1 | 0 | 0 | 0 | 0 |
