= Jon Morcillo =

Spanish footballer (born 1998)

Personal information
- Full name: Jon Morcillo Conesa
- Date of birth: 15 September 1998 (age 28)
- Place of birth: Amorebieta-Etxano, Spain
- Height: 1.83 m (6 ft 0 in)
- Position: Winger

Team information
- Current team: Almería
- Number: 7

Youth career
- Amorebieta
- Durango

Senior career*
Years	Team	Apps	(Gls)
2016	Durango	1	(0)
2016–2018	Basconia	68	(12)
2018–2020	Bilbao Athletic	43	(11)
2020–2024	Athletic Bilbao	47	(2)
2022	→ Valladolid (loan)	11	(1)
2023–2024	→ Amorebieta (loan)	37	(4)
2024–2026	Albacete	54	(13)
2026–	Almería	20	(3)

International career^{‡}
2020–	Basque Country	1	(0)
- * Club domestic league appearances and goals as of 3 June 2026 ‡ National team caps and goals as of 19:29, 17 November 2020 (UTC)

Jon Morcillo Conesa (born 15 September 1998) is a Spanish professional footballer who plays as a left winger for Segunda División club Almería.

== Club career ==
=== Early career ===
Born in Amorebieta-Etxano, Biscay, Basque Country to a Basque father and a mother from Cartagena, Region of Murcia, Morcillo represented SD Amorebieta and SCD Durango as a youth. He made his senior debut with the latter's first team on 1 May 2016, in a 2–0 Tercera División away loss against CD Vitoria.

=== Athletic Bilbao ===
In June 2016, Morcillo joined Athletic Bilbao at the age of 17, being initially assigned to the farm team also in the regional fourth division. Promoted to the reserves in June 2018, he made his Segunda División B debut for them on 25 August of that year, playing the last four minutes of a 2–0 home win over CD Tudelano.

Morcillo scored his first goal for the B side on 25 November 2018, opening the 1–1 draw at Barakaldo CF. He emerged as an important player during the 2019–20 season by contributing ten goals, including one from the halfway line in a 3–0 away victory against Tudelano on 22 September 2019.

On 8 May 2020, Morcillo renewed his contract with the Lions until 2023, being subsequently called up to pre-season with the main squad. He made his first-team – and La Liga – debut on 12 September, three days before his 22nd birthday, playing the full 90 minutes of a 2–0 away defeat to Granada CF. He was definitely promoted to the first team in October, being given the number 2 jersey.

Morcillo featured intermittently across his maiden campaign, coming off the bench against Real Madrid and FC Barcelona as Athletic beat both rivals to claim the 2021 Supercopa de España in January 2021, but not selected in the squad for the 2020 final of the Copa del Rey (delayed due to the COVID-19 pandemic in Spain) three months later, which ended in defeat to Real Sociedad. Having scored in the quarter-final penalty shootout and assisted the decisive goal in the semi-finals of the Spanish Cup, he was named among the substitutes for the 2021 final which took place on 17 April, just two weeks after the previous edition; he did not get on the field in the 4–0 loss to Barcelona.

On 28 April 2021, Morcillo scored his first league goal, in a 2–2 draw at home to Real Valladolid. The following January he was loaned to that side, now playing in the Segunda División, until the end of the season.

On 23 August 2023, Morcillo returned to his first club Amorebieta on loan for the 2023–24 campaign.

=== Albacete ===
On 2 July 2024, free agent Morcillo signed a two-year deal with Albacete Balompié in the second division.

=== Almería ===
On 15 January 2026, Morcillo signed with UD Almería of the same league until the end of the season, with an option to extend his contract for four years.

== International career ==
Morcillo won caps for the unofficial Basque Country team, making his debut against Costa Rica in November 2020.

== Career statistics ==
As of match played 1 July 2021

Appearances and goals by club, season and competition
Club	Season	League			National Cup		Continental		Other		Total	
Club	Season	Division	Apps	Goals	Apps	Goals	Apps	Goals	Apps	Goals	Apps	Goals
Durango	2015–16	Tercera División	1	0	—		—		—		1	0
Basconia	2016–17	Tercera División	35	6	—		—		—		35	6
Basconia	2017–18	Tercera División	33	6	—		—		—		33	6
Basconia	Total		68	12	0	0	0	0	0	0	38	12
Bilbao Athletic	2018–19	Segunda División B	15	1	—		—		—		15	1
Bilbao Athletic	2019–20	Segunda División B	28	10	—		—		1 (Note: Appearance(s) in Promotion Playoffs)	0	29	10
Bilbao Athletic	Total		43	11	0	0	0	0	1	0	44	11
Athletic Bilbao	2020–21	La Liga	30	2	4	0	—		2 (Note: Appearance(s) in Supercopa de España)	0	36	2
Career total			142	25	4	0	0	0	3	0	149	25

== Honours ==
Athletic Bilbao

- Supercopa de España: 2021
- Copa del Rey runner-up: 2020–21
