= Unai Vencedor =

Spanish footballer (born 2000)

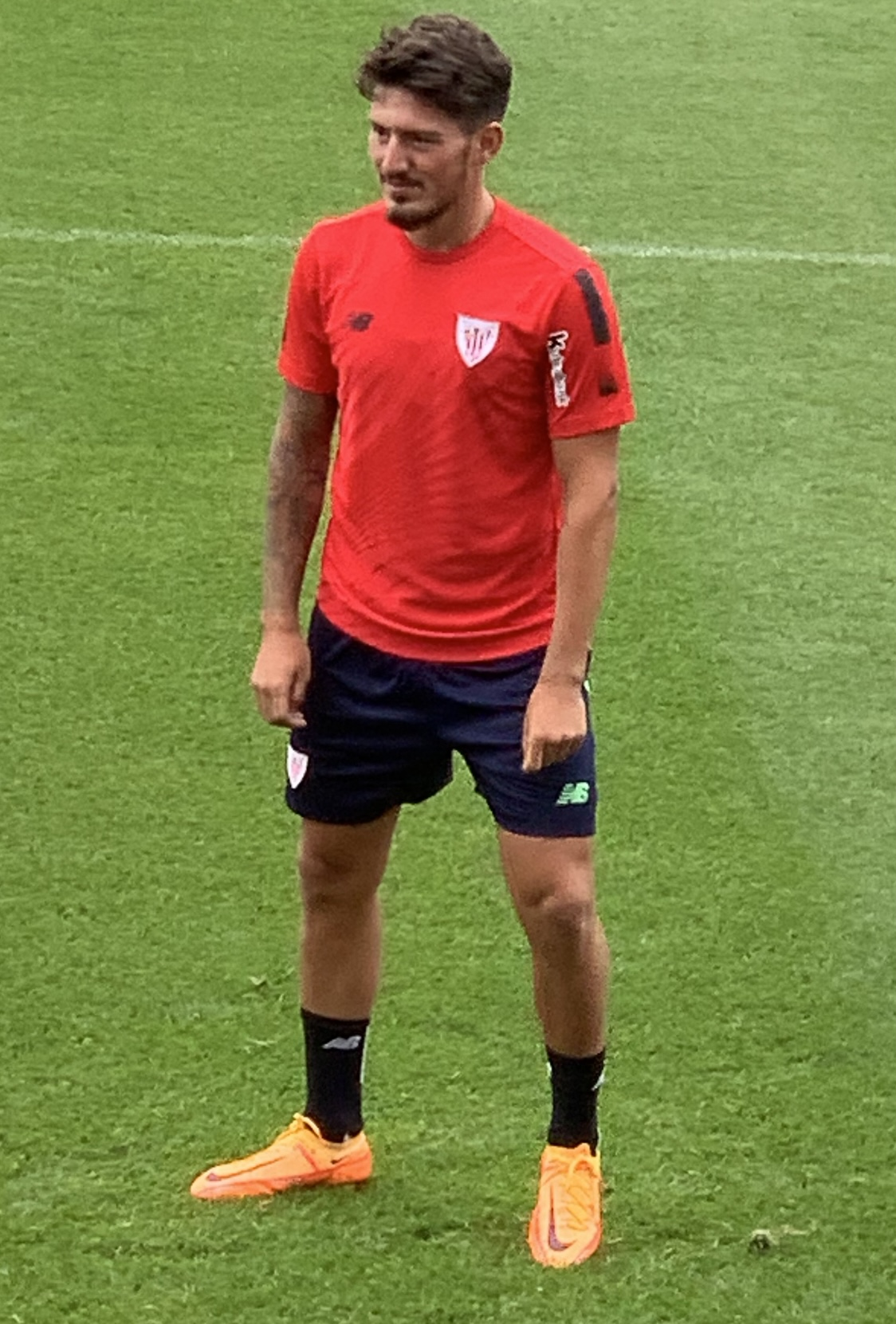
- Vencedor with Athletic Bilbao in 2022

Personal information
- Full name: Unai Vencedor Paris
- Date of birth: 15 November 2000 (age 25)
- Place of birth: Bilbao, Spain
- Height: 1.76 m (5 ft 9 in)
- Position: Midfielder

Team information
- Current team: Burgos

Youth career
- 2007–2017: Santutxu
- 2017–2018: Athletic Bilbao

Senior career*
Years	Team	Apps	(Gls)
2018–2020	Bilbao Athletic	62	(5)
2020–2026	Athletic Bilbao	73	(0)
2023–2024	→ Eibar (loan)	38	(2)
2024–2025	→ Racing Santander (loan)	38	(0)
2025–2026	→ Levante (loan)	16	(0)
2026–	Burgos	0	(0)

International career^{‡}
2018–2019	Spain U19	3	(0)
2021–	Spain U21	8	(0)
- * Club domestic league appearances and goals as of 27 May 2026 ‡ National team caps and goals as of 7 June 2022

Unai Vencedor Paris (born 15 November 2000) is a Spanish professional footballer who plays as a midfielder for Burgos CF.

== Club career ==
Born in Bilbao, Biscay, Basque Country, Vencedor joined Athletic Bilbao's Lezama academy in 2017, from Santutxu FC. In June of the following year, after finishing his formation, he moved straight into the reserve squad for the pre-season (skipping the usual step to the farm team), and made his senior debut on 29 September by starting in a 2–1 Segunda División B away loss against Real Oviedo Vetusta.

He scored his first senior goal on 15 December 2018, netting his team's second in a 3–2 home win against CD Calahorra. Six days later, he renewed his contract with the Lions until 2023.

Vencedor made his first team – and La Liga – debut on 16 February 2020, starting in a 1–0 home defeat to CA Osasuna. He did not feature again that season and was reported to have requested a loan move to continue his development, but was told he would be in contention for a place during the 2020–21 campaign. He had to wait until the end of November 2020 before making another start against Real Betis, but was selected regularly from then on.

Having established himself in the squad (including winning the Supercopa de España with victories over Real Madrid then FC Barcelona), in February 2021 Vencedor agreed a new contract with Athletic running to the summer of 2025, with a €40 million buyout clause. During the 2022–23 campaign, however, he lost his starting spot to Mikel Vesga and Oihan Sancet.

On 5 August 2023, Vencedor was loaned to Segunda División side SD Eibar for the season. On 10 July of the following year, he moved to fellow league team Racing de Santander also in a temporary one-year deal.

On 2 September 2025, Athletic announced the loan of Vencedor to fellow top tier side Levante UD, for one year. The following 1 September, he terminated his link with the Lions, and subsequently signed a one-year deal with Burgos CF in division two.

== International career ==
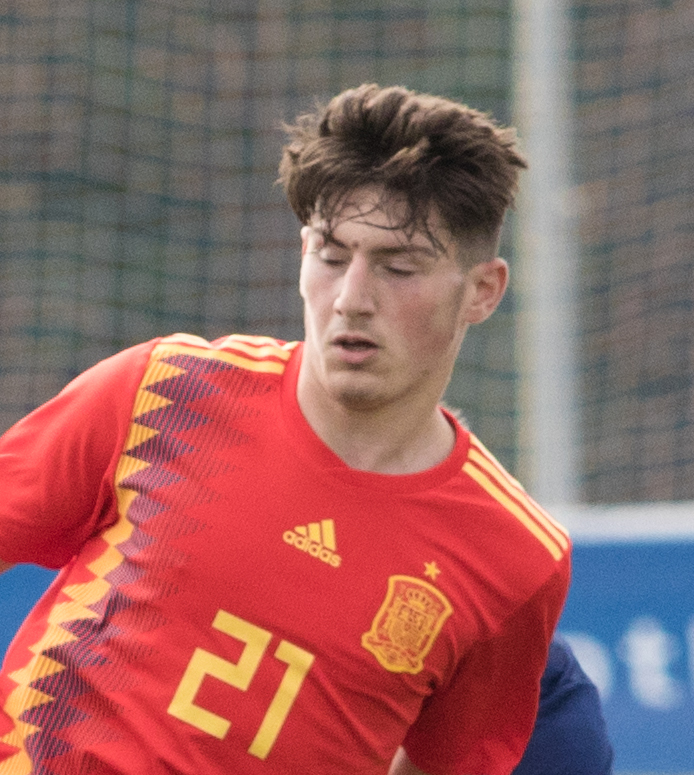
Vencedor with Spain U19 in 2019

Vencedor is a youth international for Spain, having represented the under-19s in 2019 and the under-21s in 2021.

== Career statistics ==
=== Club ===
As of match played 7 March 2026

Appearances and goals by club, season and competition
Club	Season	League			National cup		Other		Total	
Club	Season	Division	Apps	Goals	Apps	Goals	Apps	Goals	Apps	Goals
Bilbao Athletic	2018–19	Segunda División B	36	2	—		—		36	2
Bilbao Athletic	2019–20	Segunda División B	26	3	—		1 (Note: Appearance(s) in Segunda División B play-offs)	0	27	3
Bilbao Athletic	Total		62	5	0	0	1	0	63	5
Athletic Bilbao	2019–20	La Liga	1	0	1 (Note: Appearance in 2020 Copa del Rey Final (played in 2021))	0	0	0	2	0
Athletic Bilbao	2020–21	La Liga	28	0	4	0	2 (Note: Appearance(s) in Supercopa de España)	0	34	0
Athletic Bilbao	2021–22	La Liga	34	0	1	0	0	0	35	0
Athletic Bilbao	2022–23	La Liga	10	0	1	0	—		11	0
Athletic Bilbao	2026–27	La Liga	0	0	0	0	—		0	0
Athletic Bilbao	Total		73	0	7	0	2	0	82	0
Eibar (loan)	2023–24	Segunda División	38	2	2	0	—		40	2
Racing Santander (loan)	2024–25	Segunda División	38	0	2	0	1 (Note: Appearance in La Liga play-offs)	0	41	0
Levante (loan)	2025–26	La Liga	16	0	3	0	—		19	0
Career total			227	7	14	0	4	0	245	7

== Honours ==
Athletic Bilbao

- Supercopa de España: 2021
- Copa del Rey runner-up: 2019–20, 2020–21
