= Asier Villalibre =

Spanish footballer (born 1997)

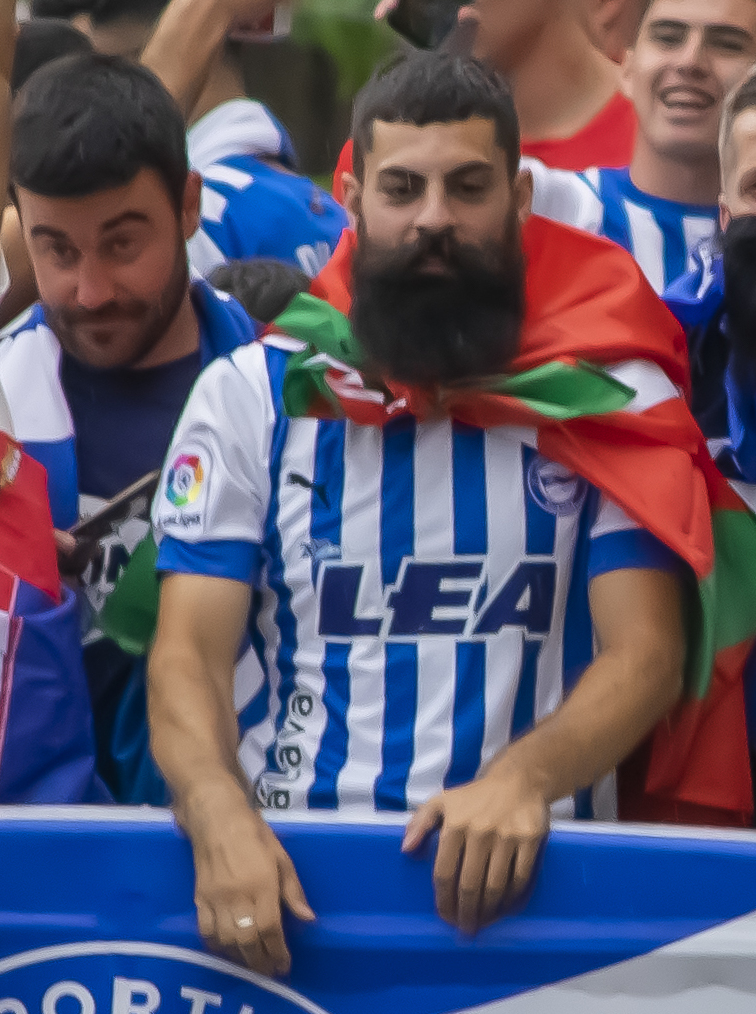
- Villalibre with Alavés in 2023

Personal information
- Full name: Asier Villalibre Molina
- Date of birth: 30 September 1997 (age 29)
- Place of birth: Guernica, Spain
- Height: 1.84 m (6 ft 0 in)
- Position: Striker

Team information
- Current team: Racing Santander
- Number: 12

Youth career
- 2011–2014: Athletic Bilbao

Senior career*
Years	Team	Apps	(Gls)
2014–2015	Basconia	45	(26)
2015–2019	Bilbao Athletic	99	(37)
2016–2024	Athletic Bilbao	102	(11)
2017	→ Numancia (loan)	6	(0)
2017–2018	→ Valladolid (loan)	13	(0)
2018	→ Lorca (loan)	12	(0)
2023	→ Alavés (loan)	16	(4)
2024–2026	Alavés	16	(1)
2025–2026	→ Racing Santander (loan)	31	(16)
2026–	Racing Santander	6	(0)

International career^{‡}
2013–2014	Spain U17	9	(2)
2014–2015	Spain U18	3	(1)
2015	Spain U19	1	(0)
2019–	Basque Country	3	(0)
- * Club domestic league appearances and goals as of 19:47, 11 October 2026 (UTC) ‡ National team caps and goals as of 24 March 2024

Asier Villalibre Molina (born 30 September 1997) is a Spanish professional footballer who plays as a striker for La Liga club Racing de Santander.

== Club career ==
=== Athletic Bilbao ===
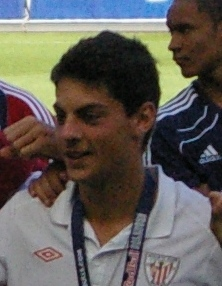
Villalibre in 2012

Born in Guernica, Biscay, Basque Country, Villalibre joined Athletic Bilbao's youth setup in 2011. He made his debut as a senior with the farm team in the 2013–14 season, scoring on his Tercera División debut at the age of 15.

In May 2015, after a further 20 goals for the third side, Villalibre was promoted to the reserves in the Segunda División – he had already represented them the previous campaign in the Segunda División B. He made his professional debut on 24 August, coming on as a second-half substitute for Gorka Santamaría in a 1–0 home loss against Girona FC.

Villalibre scored his first professional goal for Bilbao Athletic on 6 September 2015, closing the 3–1 home win over RCD Mallorca. At 17 years and 341 days, this made him the second-youngest goalscorer for the team when competing in the second division (behind Ander Garitano's 17 years and 198 days in 1986).

On 3 December 2016, Villalibre was called up to the first team for the Basque derby against SD Eibar, with habitual first-choice Aritz Aduriz suspended after being sent off in the previous league match. He made his La Liga debut the following day, replacing Iñaki Williams after 84 minutes and providing the assist for Iker Muniain to score the final goal of a 3–1 victory in injury time.

Villalibre appeared in his first game in European competition on 8 December 2016, contributing another decisive pass in a 1–1 draw away to SK Rapid Wien in the UEFA Europa League group stage after once again coming on from the bench. In May 2017, he was loaned out to CD Numancia for one month.

On 20 August 2017, Villalibre was loaned to second-tier club Real Valladolid for one year. After only netting twice in the cup, his loan was terminated and he subsequently moved to Lorca FC of the same league also in a temporary deal.

Villalibre scored his first league goal for Athletic on 25 January 2020, playing 84 minutes in the 1–1 away draw with RCD Espanyol. The following 17 January, his last-minute equaliser against FC Barcelona earned extra time and an eventual 3–2 win in the 2021 Supercopa de España final; he was also the target of an aggression that earned Lionel Messi the first club red card of his career.

After totalling 35 games and four goals in 2020–21, Villalibre fell down the pecking order the following years, and was loaned to Deportivo Alavés on 30 January 2023. He scored twice during the second-division play-offs to help the club to gain promotion, starting with a 2–0 victory over Eibar; in the second leg of the final at Levante UD, his penalty deep into injury time of extra time was the tie's only goal.

Back with Athletic, on 16 September 2023 Villalibre scored in a 3–0 win over Cádiz CF just a few seconds after replacing Gorka Guruzeta. On 7 December, in his first start of the season, he netted twice against CD Cayón in the second round of the Copa del Rey. A month later, he added two to help defeat Eibar in the round of 32 (3–0), repeating the feat in the next stage as the hosts downed Alavés 2–0; with these six goals, he equalled Javi Luke's tally from the 1991–92 edition, and finished joint-top scorer of the tournament together with Abdón Prats and Anastasios Douvikas. He did not leave the bench in the final, won against Mallorca on penalties.

=== Alavés ===
On 15 July 2024, Villalibre returned to Alavés on a four-year contract. He played much less minutes in his second spell, scoring his only goal on 28 August in the 2–1 win at Real Sociedad from a penalty.

=== Racing Santander ===
In August 2025, Villalibre was loaned to second division side Racing de Santander with an obligatory buyout clause in case of promotion. In his first three appearances for the latter, he scored four times to be named Segunda División Player of the Month.

Villalibre scored 16 goals for Racing, who returned to the top flight as champions; consequently, he signed a permanent deal on 19 May 2026.

== International career ==
Villalibre made his debut for the unofficial Basque Country national team in May 2019, in a 0–0 draw away to Panama for which a small, youthful and inexperienced squad was selected.

== Career statistics ==
As of match played 25 May 2024

Appearances and goals by club, season and competition
Club	Season	League			Copa del Rey		Europe		Other		Total	
Club	Season	Division	Apps	Goals	Apps	Goals	Apps	Goals	Apps	Goals	Apps	Goals
Basconia	2013–14	Tercera División	11	6	—		—		—		11	6
Basconia	2014–15	Tercera División	34	20	—		—		—		34	20
Basconia	Total		45	26	0	0	0	0	0	0	45	26
Bilbao Athletic	2014–15	Segunda División B	2	0	—		—		2 (Note: Appearances in Segunda División B play-offs)	0	4	0
Bilbao Athletic	2015–16	Segunda División	32	3	—		—		—		32	3
Bilbao Athletic	2016–17	Segunda División B	27	11	—		—		—		27	11
Bilbao Athletic	2018–19	Segunda División B	38	23	—		—		—		38	23
Bilbao Athletic	Total		99	37	0	0	0	0	2	0	101	37
Athletic Bilbao	2016–17	La Liga	6	0	0	0	2 (Note: Appearances in UEFA Europa League)	0	—		8	0
Athletic Bilbao	2019–20	La Liga	19	3	5 (Note: Includes appearance in 2020 Copa del Rey final (played in 2021))	2	—		—		24	5
Athletic Bilbao	2020–21	La Liga	35	4	6	1	—		2 (Note: Appearances in Supercopa de España)	1	43	6
Athletic Bilbao	2021–22	La Liga	19	2	1	0	—		0	0	20	2
Athletic Bilbao	2022–23	La Liga	5	0	3	0	—		—		8	0
Athletic Bilbao	2023–24	La Liga	18	2	6	6	—		—		24	8
Athletic Bilbao	Total		102	11	21	9	2	0	2	1	127	21
Numancia (loan)	2016–17	Segunda División	6	0	0	0	—		—		6	0
Valladolid (loan)	2017–18	Segunda División	13	0	4	2	—		—		17	2
Lorca (loan)	2017–18	Segunda División	12	0	0	0	—		—		12	0
Alavés (loan)	2022–23	Segunda División	16	4	—		—		4 (Note: Appearances in Segunda División play-offs)	2	20	6
Career total			293	78	25	11	2	0	8	3	328	92

== Honours ==
Athletic Bilbao

- Copa del Rey: 2023–24; runner-up: 2019–20, 2020–21
- Supercopa de España: 2021

Racing Santander

- Segunda División: 2025–26
