= Ander Capa =

Spanish footballer (born 1992)

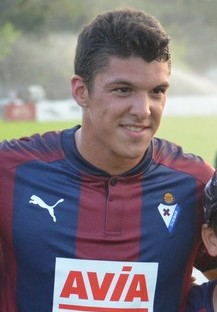
- Capa with Eibar in 2017

Personal information
- Full name: Ander Capa Rodríguez
- Date of birth: 8 February 1992 (age 34)
- Place of birth: Portugalete, Spain
- Height: 1.76 m (5 ft 9 in)
- Positions: Right-back; winger

Youth career
- 2001–2002: Danok Bat
- 2002–2005: Athletic Bilbao
- 2005–2011: Danok Bat

Senior career*
Years	Team	Apps	(Gls)
2011–2012	Eibar B	34	(2)
2012–2018	Eibar	190	(12)
2018–2023	Athletic Bilbao	96	(5)
2023–2024	Levante	21	(0)
2024–2025	Portugalete	18	(0)
Total		359	(19)

International career
2014–2020	Basque Country	5	(0)
- * Club domestic league appearances and goals

Ander Capa Rodríguez (born 8 February 1992) is a Spanish former professional footballer who played as a right-back or a winger.

He played mainly with Eibar during his career, representing the club in three levels of Spanish football including La Liga; over seven seasons, he appeared in 214 competitive matches and scored 15 goals. He joined Athletic Bilbao in 2018, winning the 2021 Supercopa de España.

== Club career ==
=== Eibar ===
Capa was born in Portugalete, Biscay, Basque Country. He played youth football with local Danok Bat CF before signing for SD Eibar, making his senior debut in the 2011–12 season with the reserves in the Tercera División.

In July 2012, Capa was promoted to the first team after appearing once with the main squad in 2011–12. In the following campaign, he played 24 matches and scored five goals (adding six games and two goals in the playoffs) as the Armeros returned to Segunda División after a four-year absence.

Capa played his first professional match on 18 August 2013, starting in a 2–1 away win against Real Jaén. He scored his first goal on 28 September, but in a 3–2 loss at Sporting de Gijón. He appeared in a further 30 games while netting once during the season, being promoted to La Liga for the first time ever.

Capa made his debut in the top flight on 24 August 2014, starting in a 1–0 home victory over Real Sociedad. He scored his first goal in the competition on 8 December, his side's last in a 5–2 home rout of UD Almería.

During the 2015 pre-season, Capa was converted from a winger into a right-back by new manager José Luis Mendilibar. On 19 November of that year, with the club still in the top tier and him as an undisputed starter, he renewed his contract until 2018.

=== Athletic Bilbao ===
On 1 September 2017, Capa agreed to join former youth club Athletic Bilbao for four years, with the deal being made effective in July 2018. Dani García made the same move; within weeks they were joined by another former teammate Yuri Berchiche, and before the end of the calendar year by the coach from their Eibar promotion seasons, Gaizka Garitano. He scored his first goal for Athletic on 10 November 2019, netting the 2–1 winner in the final minutes of the home fixture against Levante UD through a volley from outside the box; he also provided the assist for the equaliser by Iker Muniain in the same game.

Having previously been a regular starter, Capa made only one competitive appearance in the 2021–22 campaign under head coach Marcelino García Toral, and that consisted of just a few minutes as a late substitute. Subsequently, he was highly critical of the manager, and with no agreement reached on a new contract – even after negotiations resumed when Jon Uriarte was elected as the new president and Ernesto Valverde was brought as the new coach – he appeared set to leave the club. However, eventually a new deal was reached in July 2022, with the player staying at San Mamés for at least one more season and potentially a second if targets were met.

=== Later career ===
On 15 August 2023, Capa signed a one-year contract with Levante UD in the second division. In November 2024, the 32-year-old moved three tiers down to Tercera Federación and joined Club Portugalete in his hometown.

== Career statistics ==
As of match played 13 March 2024

Appearances and goals by club, season and competition
Club	Season	League			National Cup		Other		Total	
Club	Season	Division	Apps	Goals	Apps	Goals	Apps	Goals	Apps	Goals
Eibar	2011–12	Segunda División B	1	0	0	0	—		1	0
Eibar	2012–13	Segunda División B	24	5	6	0	6 (Note: Appearances in Segunda División B play-offs)	2	36	7
Eibar	2013–14	Segunda División	31	2	2	1	—		33	3
Eibar	2014–15	La Liga	34	3	2	0	—		36	3
Eibar	2015–16	La Liga	36	2	1	0	—		37	2
Eibar	2016–17	La Liga	31	0	6	0	—		37	0
Eibar	2017–18	La Liga	33	0	1	0	—		34	0
Eibar	Total		190	12	18	1	6	2	214	15
Athletic Bilbao	2018–19	La Liga	25	0	3	0	—		28	0
Athletic Bilbao	2019–20	La Liga	35	3	7 (Note: Includes appearance in 2020 Copa del Rey final (played in 2021))	0	—		42	3
Athletic Bilbao	2020–21	La Liga	28	2	4	0	2 (Note: Appearance in Supercopa de España)	0	34	2
Athletic Bilbao	2021–22	La Liga	1	0	0	0	0	0	1	0
Athletic Bilbao	2022–23	La Liga	7	0	0	0	0	0	7	0
Athletic Bilbao	Total		96	5	14	0	2	0	112	5
Levante	2023–24	Segunda División	21	0	0	0	—		21	0
Career total			307	17	32	1	8	2	347	20

== Honours ==
Eibar

- Segunda División: 2013–14

Athletic Bilbao

- Supercopa de España: 2021
- Copa del Rey runner-up: 2019–20, 2020–21
