= Unai Nuñez =

Spanish footballer (born 1997)

Personal information
- Full name: Unai Nuñez Gestoso
- Date of birth: 30 January 1997 (age 29)
- Place of birth: Sestao, Spain
- Height: 1.86 m (6 ft 1 in)
- Position: Centre-back

Team information
- Current team: Espanyol (on loan from Celta)

Youth career
- 2007–2015: Athletic Bilbao

Senior career*
Years	Team	Apps	(Gls)
2015–2016	Basconia	28	(1)
2016–2017	Bilbao Athletic	33	(3)
2017–2024	Athletic Bilbao	116	(3)
2022–2024	→ Celta (loan)	76	(1)
2024–	Celta	0	(0)
2024–2025	→ Athletic Bilbao (loan)	10	(0)
2025–2026	→ Hellas Verona (loan)	17	(0)
2026	→ Valencia (loan)	13	(0)
2026–	→ Espanyol (loan)	0	(0)

International career^{‡}
2017–2019	Spain U21	13	(0)
2019–	Spain	1	(0)
2020–	Basque Country	1	(1)
- * Club domestic league appearances and goals as of 27 May 2026 ‡ National team caps and goals as of 19:34, 17 November 2020 (UTC)

Unai Nuñez Gestoso (Basque: [unai nuɲes̻]; Spanish: [ˈunaj ˈnuɲeθ]; born 30 January 1997) is a Spanish professional footballer who plays as a centre-back for La Liga club RCD Espanyol, on loan from RC Celta de Vigo. He has one cap for the Spain national team.

== Club career ==
Born in Sestao, Biscay, Basque Country and raised in neighbouring Portugalete, Nuñez joined Athletic Bilbao's Lezama academy in 2007, aged ten. He made his debut as a senior with the farm team in the 2015–16 season, in Tercera División.

On 7 June 2016, Nuñez was promoted to the reserves, freshly relegated to Segunda División B. He immediately became a starter for the side, appearing in 33 matches and scoring three goals during the campaign.

On 2 June 2017, Nuñez was called up to the main squad for the pre-season by new first team manager José Ángel Ziganda. He made his first team – and La Liga – debut on 20 August, starting in a 0–0 home draw against Getafe CF. On 30 October 2017, after already becoming a regular starter, Nuñez renewed his contract until 2023, with a €30 million buyout clause. The following 31 March he scored his first goal in the main category, netting the opener in a 1–1 home draw against RC Celta de Vigo.

After making 36 appearances in 2017–18, Nuñez played far less (14 matches) during the 2018–19 season, initially finding himself behind rookie Peru Nolaskoain as well as Iñigo Martínez and Yeray Álvarez in the queue for selection in the position.

In November 2020 he signed an extended contract running to 2025, with no buyout clause. During that period he played frequently due to injuries suffered by teammates and when a system with three central defenders was used, but he again found himself to the bench when all were fit and the preferred formation reverted to a central pair; there was even more competition for a place after Daniel Vivian also joined the squad.

On 16 July 2022, Nuñez was loaned to fellow top tier side Celta de Vigo for the season. He featured regularly and impressively for Celta, who took up the option to extend the deal for a second season.

In March 2024, Celta agreed to buy Nuñez permanently from Athletic, for a rumoured fee of around € 10 million, effective in July. On 28 August, however, he returned to Athletic on loan for the season.

On 25 July 2025, Nuñez moved abroad for the first time in his career, joining Serie A side Hellas Verona FC on a one-year loan deal. The loan was terminated early and on 23 January 2026, was loaned once again, this time to Valencia CF.

On 6 August 2026, Nuñez moved to fellow top tier side RCD Espanyol on a one-year loan deal.

== International career ==
On 25 August 2017, Nuñez received his first call-up to the Spain under-21 squad. He was called up to the full side by manager Robert Moreno on 30 August 2019, for two UEFA Euro 2020 qualifying matches against Romania and the Faroe Islands. He made his debut in the second fixture in Gijón on 8 September, coming on as a late substitute for Sergio Ramos with Spain 2–0 ahead; the final result was 4–0. Good club form for Celta Vigo took him back into consideration for selection in March 2023 (this was shortly before to Robin Le Normand obtained Spanish nationality and became established in the national side).

He has also played for the unofficial Basque Country team, making his debut against Costa Rica in November 2020 and scoring the winning goal with a header in the closing minutes.

== Personal life ==
Nuñez's father, Abel, was also a footballer and a defender who mainly represented Barakaldo CF during his career, having migrated from Galicia to the Basque region when young. His elder brother Asier played in the same position for local Club Portugalete and JD Somorrostro.

== Career statistics ==
=== Club ===
As of 24 January 2026

Appearances and goals by club, season and competition
Club	Season	League			National Cup (Note: includes Copa del Rey, Coppa Italia)		Europe		Other		Total	
Club	Season	Division	Apps	Goals	Apps	Goals	Apps	Goals	Apps	Goals	Apps	Goals
Basconia	2015–16	Tercera División	28	1	–		–		–		28	1
Bilbao Athletic	2016–17	Segunda División B	33	3	–		–		–		33	3
Athletic Bilbao	2017–18	La Liga	33	1	0	0	3 (Note: Appearance(s) in UEFA Europa League)	0	–		36	1
Athletic Bilbao	2018–19	La Liga	12	0	2	0	–		–		14	0
Athletic Bilbao	2019–20	La Liga	20	0	6	0	–		–		26	0
Athletic Bilbao	2020–21	La Liga	25	1	4	1	–		2 (Note: Appearance(s) in Supercopa de España)	0	31	2
Athletic Bilbao	2021–22	La Liga	9	0	0	0	–		0	0	9	0
Athletic Bilbao	Total		99	2	12	1	3	0	2	0	116	3
Celta (loan)	2022–23	La Liga	36	0	3	0	–		–		39	0
Celta (loan)	2023–24	La Liga	34	1	3	0	–		–		37	1
Celta (loan)	Total		70	1	6	0	–		–		76	1
Celta	2024–25	La Liga	0	0	0	0	–		–		0	0
Athletic Bilbao (loan)	2024–25	La Liga	10	0	1	0	4	0	0	0	15	0
Hellas Verona (loan)	2025–26	Serie A	17	0	1	0	–		–		18	0
Valencia (loan)	2025–26	La Liga	0	0	0	0	–		–		0	0
Career total			257	7	20	1	7	0	2	0	282	8

== Honours ==
Athletic Bilbao

- Supercopa de España: 2021
- Copa del Rey: runner-up 2019–20, 2020–21

Spain U21

- UEFA European Under-21 Championship: 2019
