= Álex Berenguer =

Spanish footballer (born 1995)

Personal information
- Full name: Alejandro Berenguer Remiro
- Date of birth: 4 July 1995 (age 31)
- Place of birth: Pamplona, Spain
- Height: 1.75 m (5 ft 9 in)
- Positions: Winger; attacking midfielder

Team information
- Current team: Athletic Bilbao
- Number: 7

Youth career
- 2006–2014: Osasuna

Senior career*
Years	Team	Apps	(Gls)
2014–2015	Osasuna B	31	(9)
2014–2017	Osasuna	80	(4)
2017–2020	Torino	84	(9)
2020–	Athletic Bilbao	216	(33)
- * Club domestic league appearances and goals as of 25 October 2026 (UTC)

Alejandro "Álex" Berenguer Remiro (born 4 July 1995) is a Spanish professional footballer who plays as a winger or attacking midfielder for La Liga club Athletic Bilbao.

Berenguer began his career at Osasuna in 2014, and played in Italy with Torino for three seasons before joining Athletic in 2020.

== Club career ==
=== Osasuna ===
Berenguer was born in Pamplona, Navarre; his father's family is from Almería. He graduated with CA Osasuna's youth setup, and made his debuts as a senior with the reserves in the 2013–14 campaign, in Tercera División.

On 10 September 2014, Berenguer made his professional debut, replacing Kenan Kodro in the 81st minute of a 2–0 away loss against Deportivo Alavés, for the season's Copa del Rey. He made his Segunda División debut on 10 January of the following year, again from the bench in a 1–1 away draw against Recreativo de Huelva.

Berenguer scored his first professional goal on 30 August 2015, netting the game's only in a home success over CD Mirandés. The following 29 January he extended his contract until 2020, and finished the campaign with three goals in 39 appearances as his side achieved promotion to La Liga.

Berenguer made his debut in the highest category of Spanish football on 22 September 2016, starting in a 2–1 home loss against RCD Espanyol. He scored in the top division for the first time on 5 April of the following year, netting the game's only goal in an away success over Deportivo Alavés.

=== Torino ===
On 17 July 2017, Berenguer was sold to Italian club Torino for €5.5 million (plus €1 million in bonuses). In addition, a clause was inserted for an additional €1.5 million in the event he was sold to Athletic Bilbao (a club he had been close to signing for but which has a rivalry with Osasuna, made worse in the weeks beforehand over accusations of Athletic 'poaching' a youth player).

=== Athletic Bilbao ===
On 2 October 2020, Athletic Bilbao reached an agreement with Torino for the transfer of Berenguer, who agreed to a four-year deal with the Lions. In January 2021 he claimed a winner's medal with his new club in the 2021 Supercopa de España played in Seville. Two months later, he scored a winning goal in extra time against Levante UD to send Athletic to the 2021 Copa del Rey Final. He started the final, but was substituted in the second half and the match, again in Seville's Estadio de La Cartuja, was lost 4–0 to FC Barcelona. A similar scenario at the same venue had unfolded two weeks earlier in the delayed 2020 Copa del Rey Final, a 1–0 defeat by Real Sociedad.

Berenguer also scored eight league goals in his first season at San Mamés, but he did not find the net again for several months of the following campaign and came under threat from teenager Nico Williams in the battle for a regular starting place on the wing. In February 2022, he broke his duck for the season with a "stunning" late winner against Real Madrid at the 2021–22 Copa del Rey's quarter-final stage, having come on for the injured Williams at half-time.

On 6 April 2024, Berenguer scored the winning penalty in the Copa del Rey final shootout against Mallorca, which granted his club their 24th title in the competition and ended a forty-year major trophy drought. He made 41 appearances that season, although 22 of those (including the cup final) was as a substitute. On 7 July 2024, having technically been a free agent for a week after the expiry of his previous deal, he signed a new contract with Athletic Bilbao valid until June 2027.

== Career statistics ==
As of match played 25 October 2026

Appearances and goals by club, season and competition
Club	Season	League			National cup (Note: Includes Copa del Rey, Coppa Italia)		Europe		Other		Total	
Club	Season	Division	Apps	Goals	Apps	Goals	Apps	Goals	Apps	Goals	Apps	Goals
Osasuna B	2013–14	Tercera División	13	1	–		–		1 (Note: Appearance in Tercera División promotion play-offs)	0	14	0
Osasuna B	2014–15	Tercera División	18	8	–		–		1	0	39	3
Osasuna B	Total		31	9	0	0	0	0	2	0	33	9
Osasuna	2014–15	Segunda División	13	0	1	0	–		–		14	0
Osasuna	2015–16	Segunda División	38	3	0	0	–		1 (Note: Appearance in La Liga play-offs)	0	39	3
Osasuna	2016–17	La Liga	29	1	2	1	–		–		31	2
Osasuna	Total		80	4	3	1	0	0	1	0	84	5
Torino	2017–18	Serie A	22	1	3	1	–		–		25	2
Torino	2018–19	Serie A	31	2	3	0	–		–		34	2
Torino	2019–20	Serie A	29	6	2	0	5 (Note: Appearances in UEFA Europa League)	0	–		36	6
Torino	2020–21	Serie A	2	0	0	0	–		–		2	0
Torino	Total		84	9	8	1	5	0	0	0	97	10
Athletic Bilbao	2019–20	La Liga	–		1 (Note: Appearance in 2020 Copa del Rey final (played in 2021))	0	–		–		1	0
Athletic Bilbao	2020–21	La Liga	35	8	6	1	–		2 (Note: Appearance(s) in Supercopa de España)	0	43	9
Athletic Bilbao	2021–22	La Liga	34	3	5	1	–		2	0	41	4
Athletic Bilbao	2022–23	La Liga	37	4	6	3	–		–		43	7
Athletic Bilbao	2023–24	La Liga	35	7	6	1	–		–		41	8
Athletic Bilbao	2024–25	La Liga	36	6	2	0	14	0	1	0	53	6
Athletic Bilbao	2025–26	La Liga	31	2	2	0	6 (Note: Appearances in UEFA Champions League)	0	1	0	40	2
Athletic Bilbao	2026–27	La Liga	8	3	0	0	—		—		8	3
Athletic Bilbao	Total		216	33	28	7	20	0	6	0	270	39
Career total			411	55	39	8	25	0	9	0	484	62

== Honours ==
Athletic Bilbao

- Copa del Rey: 2023–24
- Supercopa de España: 2021
