= Mikel Vesga =

Spanish footballer

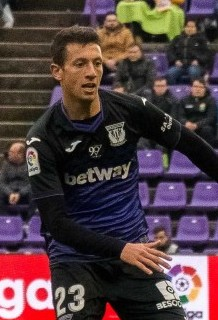
- Vesga with Leganés in 2018

Personal information
- Full name: Mikel Vesga Arruti
- Date of birth: 8 April 1993 (age 33)
- Place of birth: Vitoria, Spain
- Height: 1.91 m (6 ft 3 in)
- Position: Defensive midfielder

Team information
- Current team: Almería
- Number: 6

Youth career
- Aurrerá

Senior career*
Years	Team	Apps	(Gls)
2012–2013	Aurrerá	25	(2)
2013–2014	Alavés B	8	(0)
2014–2016	Bilbao Athletic	74	(4)
2016–2026	Athletic Bilbao	211	(9)
2017	→ Sporting Gijón (loan)	17	(1)
2018–2019	→ Leganés (loan)	26	(1)
2026–	Almería	10	(0)

International career^{‡}
2018–	Basque Country	2	(0)
- * Club domestic league appearances and goals as of 21:55, 15 November 2026 (UTC) ‡ National team caps and goals as of 24 March 2024

Mikel Vesga Arruti (Spanish pronunciation: [ˈmikel ˈβesɣa]; (Note: In isolation, Vesga is pronounced [ˈbesɣa].) born 8 April 1993) is a Spanish professional footballer who plays as a defensive midfielder for Segunda División club Almería.

He spent the better part of his career with Athletic Bilbao, making 275 total appearances and winning the 2023–24 Copa del Rey and the 2021 Supercopa de España. In La Liga, he also represented Sporting de Gijón and Leganés.

== Club career ==
=== Early career ===
Born in Vitoria-Gasteiz, Álava, Basque Country, Vesga made his debut as a senior with CD Aurrerá de Vitoria in 2012, in the Tercera División. He moved to Deportivo Alavés in summer 2013, being assigned to the reserves also in the fourth division.

=== Athletic Bilbao ===
On 1 July 2014, after refusing a new deal, Vesga joined another reserve team, Bilbao Athletic from Segunda División B. Having gained the confidence of coach José Ángel Ziganda he was ever-present during the season, appearing in 38 matches and scoring three goals as they returned to Segunda División after 19 years.

Vesga made his professional debut on 24 August 2015, starting in a 1–0 home loss against Girona FC. He scored his first league goal on 7 February of the following year, the winner in a 3–2 away victory over RCD Mallorca.

On 17 August 2016, having spent the whole pre-season with the first team, Vesga was definitely promoted to the Ernesto Valverde-led side and was assigned the number 12 shirt. He made his La Liga debut four days later, coming on as a second-half substitute for Mikel San José in the 2–1 defeat at Sporting de Gijón.

On 12 September 2016, Vesga extended his contract until 2019, with a buyout clause set at €30 million. In January 2017, he was loaned to fellow top-tier club Sporting Gijón until the end of the campaign. He scored his first goal in the competition on 15 April, putting the hosts ahead 2–1 in an eventual 3–2 loss against Real Madrid at El Molinón.

On 4 July 2018, Vesga was loaned to CD Leganés also from the Spanish top flight in a season-long move. In January 2021, he agreed to an extension at Athletic until summer 2024, with a release clause of €50 million.

On 3 February 2022, Vesga provided the assist for Álex Berenguer to score a late winning goal against Real Madrid in the quarter-finals of the Copa del Rey. On 21 April, he closed the 3–2 victory at Cádiz CF with a shot from outside the box, also being sent off in the match. A week later, he was the standout player in the defeat of Atlético Madrid, with 15 ball recoveries and a 98% pass completion rate.

Vesga scored two penalties in a 4–2 win over Real Betis on 27 August 2023. He again renewed his contract at the San Mamés Stadium in December, to run until 30 June 2027.

=== Almería ===
On 2 August 2026, aged 33, Vesga signed a three-year deal with UD Almería.

== Career statistics ==
As of match played 23 May 2026

Appearances and goals by club, season and competition
Club	Season	League			Copa del Rey		Continental		Other		Total	
Club	Season	Division	Apps	Goals	Apps	Goals	Apps	Goals	Apps	Goals	Apps	Goals
Bilbao Athletic	2014–15	Segunda División B	33	3	—		—		5 (Note: Appearances in Segunda División B play-offs)	0	38	3
Bilbao Athletic	2015–16	Segunda División	41	1	—		—		—		41	1
Bilbao Athletic	Total		74	4	0	0	0	0	5	0	79	4
Athletic Bilbao	2016–17	La Liga	6	0	1	0	1 (Note: Appearances in UEFA Europa League)	0	—		8	0
Athletic Bilbao	2017–18	La Liga	12	1	2	0	7	0	—		21	1
Athletic Bilbao	2019–20	La Liga	20	0	7 (Note: Includes appearance in 2020 Copa del Rey final (played in 2021))	0	—		—		27	0
Athletic Bilbao	2020–21	La Liga	30	0	6	0	—		2 (Note: Appearances in Supercopa de España)	0	38	0
Athletic Bilbao	2021–22	La Liga	32	2	5	0	–		2	0	39	2
Athletic Bilbao	2022–23	La Liga	36	3	7	1	–		–		43	4
Athletic Bilbao	2023–24	La Liga	27	3	5	0	–		–		32	3
Athletic Bilbao	2024–25	La Liga	25	0	1	0	7	0	1	0	34	0
Athletic Bilbao	2025–26	La Liga	23	0	4	0	6 (Note: Appearances in UEFA Champions League)	0	0	0	33	0
Athletic Bilbao	Total		211	9	38	0	21	0	5	0	275	10
Sporting Gijón (loan)	2016–17	La Liga	17	1	0	0	—		—		17	1
Leganés (loan)	2018–19	La Liga	26	1	2	0	—		—		28	1
Career total			328	15	40	1	21	0	10	0	399	16

== Honours ==
Athletic Bilbao

- Copa del Rey: 2023–24; runner-up: 2019–20, 2020–21
- Supercopa de España: 2021
