= 2020 Copa del Rey final =

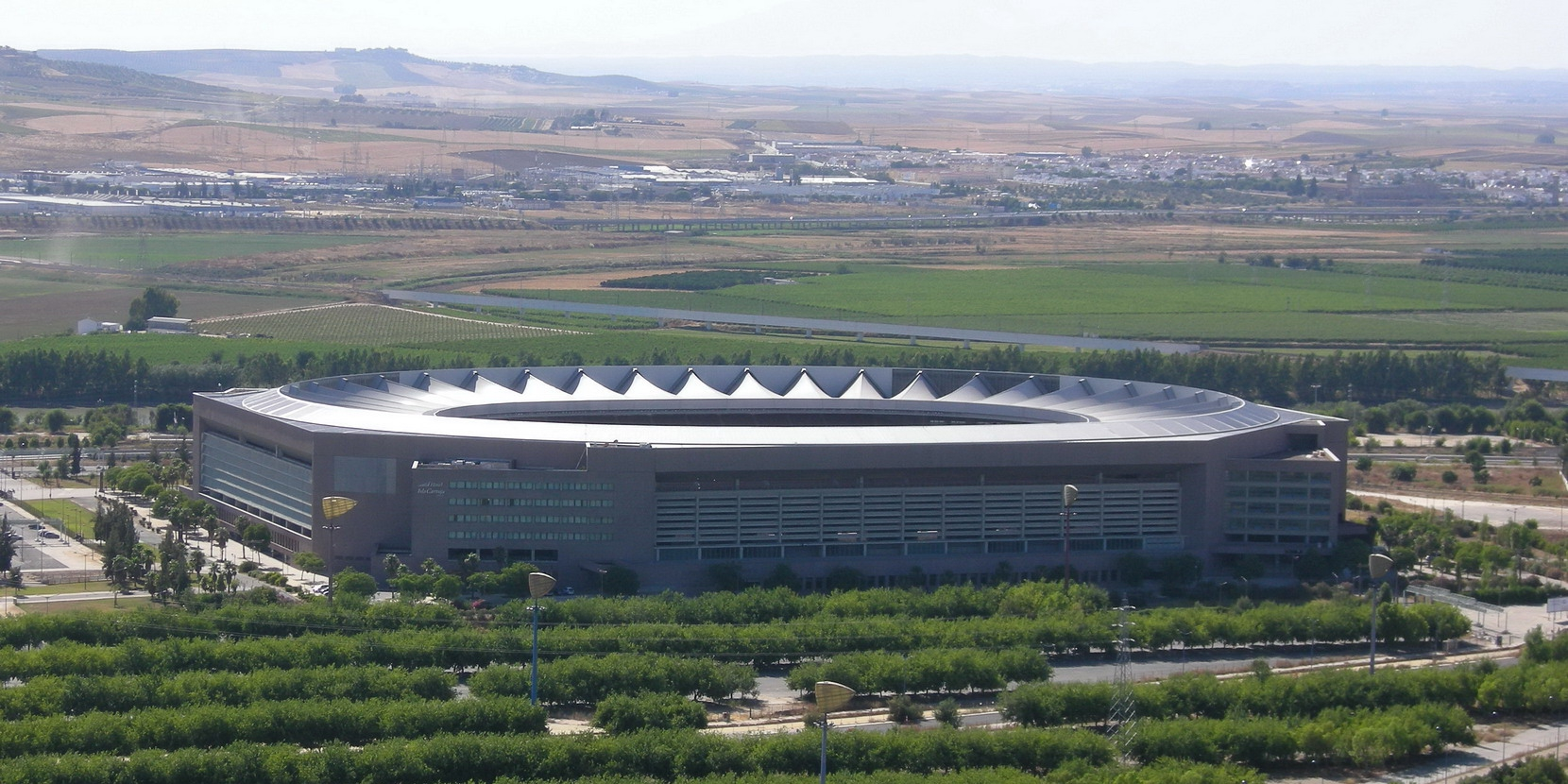
- La Cartuja in Seville hosted the final.
- Event: 2019–20 Copa del Rey
Athletic Bilbao	Real Sociedad
0	1
- Date: 3 April 2021
- Venue: La Cartuja, Seville
- Man of the Match: Mikel Merino (Real Sociedad)
- Referee: Xavier Estrada Fernández (Catalonia)
- Attendance: 0 (Note: The match was played behind closed doors due to the COVID-19 pandemic in Spain.)

The 2020 Copa del Rey final was a football match that decided the winner of the 2019–20 Copa del Rey, the 118th edition of Spain's primary football cup (including two seasons where two rival editions were played). The match was played at the Estadio de La Cartuja in Seville between Athletic Bilbao and Real Sociedad, the first Basque derby final.

Originally scheduled for 18 April 2020, the match was postponed with the agreement of the participating clubs on 11 March (with no new date decided at that point) due to the COVID-19 pandemic, which had led to football matches being cancelled or played behind closed doors as a measure to prevent the spread of the virus, in the hope that the delay would provide time to contain the outbreak and allow the final to take place with a full stadium as in normal circumstances. The final was played on 3 April 2021, despite earlier press rumours that had suggested it would be a day later.

Real Sociedad won the final 1–0 thanks to a second-half penalty converted by Mikel Oyarzabal, achieving their second Copa del Rey title (in 1909 it was won by its forerunner, Club Ciclista de San Sebastián), ending a 34-year trophy drought dating to 1987.

== Background ==
Real Sociedad were competing in their eighth Copa del Rey final, having lost their last final in 1988 to Barcelona. Athletic Bilbao were competing in their 38th final, (Note: Athletic's website claimed it was their 40th final, but this total included the 1902 Copa de la Coronación, the status of which is disputed both as a Copa del Rey event and as a tournament entered by their club, and the scheduled 1904 Copa del Rey final which was never played.) having lost their last final in 2015, also to Barcelona. In reaching the final, both teams were assured qualification for the four-team 2021 Supercopa de España; (Note: As the result of the match was not known before the start of the 2021 Supercopa, both teams qualified.) this four-team competition was played in January 2021 and won by Athletic.

In the 1910 Copa del Rey (which had two rival tournaments running in parallel), the two clubs participated in the three-team group of the UECF competition along with Madrid FC. The decisive match was between the Basque teams (Athletic winning 1–0), but as it was not a final in the traditional knockout format and the newly-formed Real Sociedad were playing under the name 'Vasconia' for licensing reasons, it was not widely recognised as an equivalent to their meeting 110 years later.

=== 350-day delay ===
Around the time of the original date for the final, the Spanish football federation (RFEF) had indicated they would grant the designated Europa League group stage berth, typically given to the winners of the tournament, to Athletic Bilbao (10th position in La Liga at the time of its suspension with eleven rounds remaining) should the match not be played within the period of 2019–20, as Real Sociedad (4th place) seemed likely to qualify for at least the Europa League and possibly the Champions League via their league position. However, on 30 April, UEFA stated that the final must be played by 3 August to activate the designated qualification place, otherwise this would revert to the team finishing seventh in La Liga (either with the fixtures completed or the standings declared). Due to the COVID-19 pandemic, it would be very unlikely that any final played by then would allow spectators into the stadium, a factor both clubs had declared was essential when it was initially postponed. Athletic submitted a formal protest against UEFA's instruction, and on 4 May both teams officially reiterated their stance to delay the match until such a time as supporters would be able to attend it.

When the league resumed in June 2020, the form of both clubs was poor: Athletic Bilbao collected 14 points from 33 available, while Real Sociedad gained only 10 points and slipped down the table; however, five of those came in the last three matchdays, including one from an 88th-minute equaliser against Atlético Madrid on the final day to keep them just above Granada and Getafe – they finished sixth and qualified for the Europa League group stage, the same status as would have been afforded the Copa winner. Athletic's challenge had already fallen short and they placed eleventh.

== Route to the final ==
Real Sociedad played in eight matches in the competition (including the final), winning each of them without needing extra time or penalties to progress on any occasion, the run including a dramatic away victory over Real Madrid at the quarter-final stage. By contrast, Athletic required a penalty shootout to eliminate two lower-division opponents and only defeated Granada on the away goals rule in the semi-finals; however, they did eliminate the title holders Barcelona who had at least reached the final in the previous six editions.

Athletic Bilbao		Round	Real Sociedad
Opponent	Result		Opponent	Result
Intercity	3–0 (A)	First round	Becerril	8–0 (A)
Sestao River	4–0 (A)	Second round	Ceuta	4–0 (A)
Elche	1–1 (5–4 p) (A)	Round of 32	Espanyol	2–0 (H)
Tenerife	3–3 (4–2 p) (A)	Round of 16	Osasuna	3–1 (H)
Barcelona	1–0 (H)	Quarter-finals	Real Madrid	4–3 (A)
Granada	1–0 (H), 1–2 (A)	Semi-finals	Mirandés	2–1 (H), 1–0 (A)

Key: (H) = Home; (A) = Away

== Match ==
=== Details ===
3 April 2021
21:30 CEST

Athletic Bilbao	0–1	Real Sociedad
	Report	Oyarzabal 63' (pen.)

La Cartuja, Seville
Attendance: 0
Referee: Xavier Estrada Fernández (Catalonia)

Athletic Bilbao	Real Sociedad

GK	1	(Spain) Unai Simón
RB	18	(Spain) Óscar de Marcos
CB	5	(Spain) Yeray Álvarez
CB	4	(Spain) Iñigo Martínez	(yellow card) 62'
LB	17	(Spain) Yuri Berchiche		(substituted off) 90+3'
RM	12	(Spain) Álex Berenguer		(substituted off) 76'
CM	14	(Spain) Dani García	(yellow card) 35'	(substituted off) 76'
CM	27	(Spain) Unai Vencedor		(substituted off) 68'
LM	10	(Spain) Iker Muniain (c)
CF	9	(Spain) Iñaki Williams
CF	22	(Spain) Raúl García
Substitutes:
GK	13	(Spain) Jokin Ezkieta
DF	3	(Spain) Unai Núñez
DF	15	(Spain) Iñigo Lekue
DF	21	(Spain) Ander Capa		(substituted on) 90+3'
DF	24	(Spain) Mikel Balenziaga
MF	6	(Spain) Mikel Vesga		(substituted on) 76'
MF	8	(Spain) Unai López		(substituted on) 68'
FW	7	(Spain) Ibai Gómez
FW	20	(Spain) Asier Villalibre		(substituted on) 76'
Manager:
(Spain) Marcelino

GK	1	(Spain) Álex Remiro
RB	18	(Spain) Andoni Gorosabel		(substituted off) 90+3'
CB	5	(Spain) Igor Zubeldia
CB	24	(France) Robin Le Normand
LB	20	(Spain) Nacho Monreal
DM	36	(Spain) Martín Zubimendi
CM	21	(Spain) David Silva		(substituted off) 85'
CM	8	(Spain) Mikel Merino	(yellow card) 71'
RF	7	(Spain) Portu		(substituted off) 89'
CF	19	(Sweden) Alexander Isak		(substituted off) 89'
LF	10	(Spain) Mikel Oyarzabal (c)
Substitutes:
GK	34	(Spain) Gaizka Ayesa
DF	6	(Spain) Aritz Elustondo		(substituted on) 90+3'
DF	12	(Spain) Aihen Muñoz
DF	15	(Mali) Modibo Sagnan
MF	11	(Belgium) Adnan Januzaj
MF	16	(Spain) Ander Guevara		(substituted on) 85'
FW	9	(Spain) Carlos Fernández		(substituted on) 89'
FW	22	(Spain) Ander Barrenetxea		(substituted on) 89'
FW	25	(Spain) Jon Bautista
Manager:
(Spain) Imanol Alguacil

Man of the Match:
Mikel Merino (Real Sociedad)

Assistant referees:
Roberto Alonso Fernández (Community of Madrid)
Guadalupe Porras Ayuso (Extremadura)
Fourth official:
José Luis Munuera Montero (Andalusia)
Reserve assistant referee:
Íñigo Prieto López de Cerain (Navarre)
Video assistant referee:
Ignacio Iglesias Villanueva (Galicia)
Assistant video assistant referee:
José Luis González González (Castile and León)

Match rules

- 90 minutes.
- 30 minutes of extra time if necessary.
- Penalty shoot-out if scores still level.
- Nine named substitutes.
- Maximum of five substitutions, with a sixth allowed in extra time. (Note: Each team was given only three opportunities to make substitutions, with a fourth opportunity in extra time, excluding substitutions made at half-time, before the start of extra time and at half-time in extra time.)
