= Ibai Gómez =

Spanish footballer (born 1989)

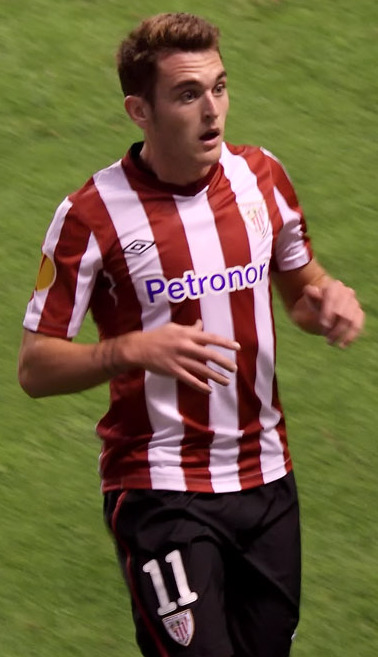
- Ibai with Athletic Bilbao in 2012

Personal information
- Full name: Ibai Gómez Pérez
- Date of birth: 11 November 1989 (age 37)
- Place of birth: Bilbao, Spain
- Height: 1.77 m (5 ft 9 1/2 in)
- Positions: Winger; forward

Team information
- Current team: Zaragoza (manager)

Youth career
- 2004–2008: Santutxu

Senior career*
Years	Team	Apps	(Gls)
2008–2009	Santutxu	31	(7)
2009–2010	Sestao	36	(8)
2010–2012	Bilbao Athletic	28	(14)
2010–2016	Athletic Bilbao	101	(13)
2016–2019	Alavés	81	(15)
2019–2022	Athletic Bilbao	44	(0)
2022	Foolad	0	(0)
2022	Deportivo La Coruña	7	(0)
Total		328	(57)

International career
2012–2018	Basque Country	4	(2)

Managerial career
- 2023–2024: Santutxu (youth)
- 2024: Dominican Republic U23
- 2024–2025: Arenas Getxo
- 2025: Andorra
- 2026–: Zaragoza
- * Club domestic league appearances and goals

Ibai Gómez Pérez (born 11 November 1989) is a Spanish former professional footballer who played mainly as a left winger. He is the manager of Primera Federación club Real Zaragoza.

He achieved La Liga totals of 226 games and 28 goals over 11 seasons, with Athletic Bilbao (two spells) and Alavés. He won the 2021 Supercopa de España with the former.

Gómez started working as a head coach in 2024, with Arenas Getxo.

== Playing career ==
=== Early years ===
Born in Bilbao, Biscay, Gómez began his career with Santutxu FC in the Basque regional leagues, winning the Golden Ball for the category in February 2009. After five years with the club he left, but stayed in the region after agreeing on a move to Segunda División B's Sestao River Club.

=== Athletic Bilbao ===
On 4 June 2010, after Sestao's relegation, Gómez moved straight into La Liga, joining Athletic Bilbao for two years with an option for a further one or two. He spent most of his first season with the reserves in the third tier.

On 17 October 2010, Gómez made his top-flight debut, coming on as a substitute for Gaizka Toquero in the 67th minute of a home match against Real Zaragoza (2–1 win); after only three minutes, however, he himself had to be replaced, being stretchered off after suffering a knee injury.

Gómez contributed two goals as Athletic reached the final of the 2011–12 UEFA Europa League – totalling seven appearances in the competition – scoring against FC Schalke 04 (2–2 home draw, 6–4 on aggregate) and Sporting CP (3–1 home victory, 4–3 aggregate win). He was definitely promoted to the first team for 2012–13, being given the number 11 jersey. On 17 November 2012, he scored his first league goal of the campaign, in a 5–1 defeat at Real Madrid.

In 2013–14, Gómez scored eight goals from only 18 appearances, helping the Lions finish fourth and qualify for the UEFA Champions League. He also dealt with some injury problems during that season, and missed the vast majority of 2015–16 due to a tendinitis ailment to his right knee.

=== Alavés ===
On 31 July 2016, Gómez terminated his contract with Athletic and signed a three-year deal with fellow top-division team Deportivo Alavés later that day. On 10 September he scored his first goal for the newly promoted club, closing a 2–1 historic win against FC Barcelona at the Camp Nou. He also started in the final of the Copa del Rey against the same opponent, which ended in a 3–1 loss.

Gómez scored his first hat-trick as a professional on 4 December 2017, helping the visitors to a 3–2 away defeat of Girona FC after they trailed 2–0 with 20 minutes left.

=== Return to Athletic ===
On 10 January 2019, Gómez rejoined Athletic Bilbao on a contract until June 2022. He made his second debut for the club three days later, coming off the bench in a 2–0 home league victory over Sevilla FC.

Gómez second spell at the San Mamés Stadium was again greatly undermined by physical problems.

=== Later career ===
Goméz moved abroad for the first time in his career in March 2022, with the 32-year-old signing with Foolad F.C. in the Persian Gulf Pro League. With his new team, he made four appearances in the AFC Champions League.

On 27 July 2022, Gómez returned to his homeland on a one-year contract at Primera Federación side Deportivo de La Coruña, with the option of a one-year extension. In November, however, he announced his retirement.

== Coaching career ==
Gómez began working as a manager with his first club Santutxu's youths. On 23 February 2024, he was appointed as head coach of the Dominican Republic national under-23 team ahead of the 2024 Olympic Games in France.

In May 2024, Gómez became the manager of Segunda Federación's Arenas Club de Getxo on a two-year deal. On 6 June of the following year, after leading the club to a promotion to Primera Federación, he left.

Gómez was appointed at Segunda División side FC Andorra on 25 June 2025, replacing Beto Company. On 23 November, after eight matches without a win, he resigned.

On 4 June 2026, Gómez was announced as head coach of Real Zaragoza for the upcoming campaign, their first ever in the third tier, with an option for two additional seasons.

== Style of play ==
Gómez was known for his crossing ability and powerful shot. Additionally, he was a set piece specialist with above-average dribbling skills.

== Career statistics ==
As of 22 May 2021

Appearances and goals by club, season and competition
Club	Season	Division	League		Cup		Europe		Other		Total	
Club	Season	Division	Apps	Goals	Apps	Goals	Apps	Goals	Apps	Goals	Apps	Goals
Sestao	2009–10	Segunda División B	36	8	—		—		—		36	8
Bilbao Athletic	2010–11	Segunda División B	12	4	—		—		—		12	4
Bilbao Athletic	2011–12	Segunda División B	16	10	—		—		—		16	10
Bilbao Athletic	Total		28	14	0	0	0	0	0	0	28	14
Athletic Bilbao	2010–11	La Liga	3	0	—		—		—		3	0
Athletic Bilbao	2011–12	La Liga	19	0	3	0	7	2	—		29	2
Athletic Bilbao	2012–13	La Liga	35	4	2	0	9	1	—		46	5
Athletic Bilbao	2013–14	La Liga	18	8	6	0	—		—		24	8
Athletic Bilbao	2014–15	La Liga	21	1	7	0	6	1	—		34	2
Athletic Bilbao	2015–16	La Liga	5	0	0	0	4	0	0	0	9	0
Athletic Bilbao	Total		101	13	18	0	26	4	0	0	145	17
Alavés	2016–17	La Liga	29	5	6	2	—		—		35	7
Alavés	2017–18	La Liga	34	7	4	0	—		—		38	7
Alavés	2018–19	La Liga	18	3	1	0	—		—		19	3
Alavés	Total		81	15	11	2	0	0	0	0	92	17
Athletic Bilbao	2018–19	La Liga	14	0	1	0	—		—		15	0
Athletic Bilbao	2019–20	La Liga	17	0	3	1	—		—		20	1
Athletic Bilbao	2020–21	La Liga	13	0	0	0	—		0	0	13	0
Athletic Bilbao	Total		44	0	4	1	0	0	0	0	48	1
Foolad	2021–22	Persian Gulf Pro League	0	0	0	0	—		0	0	0	0
Career total			290	50	33	3	26	4	0	0	349	57

== Managerial statistics ==
As of match played 21 November 2026

Managerial record by team and tenure
Team	Nat	From	To	Record								Ref
Team	Nat	From	To	G	W	D	L	GF	GA	GD	Win %	Ref
Dominican Republic U23	(Dominican Republic)	23 February 2024	31 July 2024	6	1	2	3	4	14	−10	16.67	
Arenas Getxo	(Spain)	23 May 2024	6 June 2025	34	21	7	6	50	24	+26	61.76	
Andorra	(Andorra)	25 June 2025	23 November 2025	16	5	5	6	22	24	−2	31.25	
Zaragoza	(Spain)	4 June 2026	Present	14	10	3	1	31	12	+19	71.43	
Career total				70	37	17	16	107	74	+33	52.86	—

== Honours ==
Athletic Bilbao

- Supercopa de España: 2021
- Copa del Rey runner-up: 2011–12, 2014–15, 2019–20
- UEFA Europa League runner-up: 2011–12

Alavés

- Copa del Rey runner-up: 2016–17
