= Yeray Álvarez =

Spanish footballer

Yeray
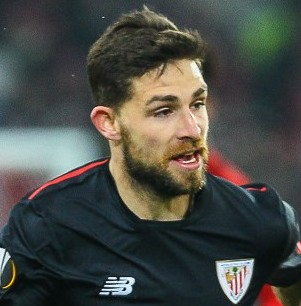
- Yeray with Athletic Bilbao in 2018

Personal information
- Full name: Yeray Álvarez López
- Date of birth: 24 January 1995 (age 31)
- Place of birth: Barakaldo, Spain
- Height: 1.82 m (6 ft 0 in)
- Position: Centre-back

Team information
- Current team: Athletic Bilbao
- Number: 5

Youth career
- 2005–2007: Barakaldo
- 2007–2008: Danok Bat
- 2008–2013: Athletic Bilbao

Senior career*
| Years | Team | Apps | (Gls) |
| 2013–2014 | Basconia | 26 | (0) |
| 2014–2016 | Bilbao Athletic | 62 | (1) |
| 2016– | Athletic Bilbao | 221 | (3) |

International career
| 2017 | Spain U21 | 2 | (0) |
| 2020 | Basque Country | 1 | (0) |
- * Club domestic league appearances and goals as of 22:24, 21 October 2026 (UTC)

Yeray Álvarez López (Spanish pronunciation: [ɟʝeˈɾaj ˈalβaɾeθ]; born 24 January 1995), known simply as Yeray, is a Spanish professional footballer who plays as a centre-back for La Liga club Athletic Bilbao.

In a career interrupted by treatment for testicular cancer and other injuries, he made more than 250 competitive appearances for Athletic Bilbao since making his debut for the first team in 2016, winning the 2023–24 Copa del Rey and the 2021 Supercopa de España. In September 2025, he was suspended from activity due to an unintentional doping violation.

Yeray represented Spain at under-21 level.

== Club career ==
Born in Barakaldo, Biscay, Basque Country, Yeray joined Athletic Bilbao's youth setup at Lezama in 2008, aged 13. He played in the 2012–13 NextGen Series with the Juvenil A side, and made his debut as a senior with CD Basconia (the farm team) in the following season, in the Tercera División.

On 26 May 2014, Yeray was promoted to the reserves who competed in the Segunda División B. He contributed with 36 appearances and one goal during the campaign – play-offs included – as they returned to Segunda División after a 19-year absence.

Yeray played his first professional game on 24 August 2015, coming on as a second-half substitute for Jurgi Oteo in a 1–0 home loss against Girona FC. He was a regular starter during that season, but the side were immediately relegated back as dead last.

In the 2016 pre-season, Yeray was promoted to the main squad, and he made his competitive debut on 15 September of that year when he played the full 90 minutes in a 3–0 away defeat to US Sassuolo Calcio in the group stage of the UEFA Europa League. His maiden La Liga appearance took place three days later, replacing Eneko Bóveda in a 2–1 home win over Valencia CF.

Yeray subsequently became a regular starter for the Lions, appearing in 17 out of a possible 20 matches in all competitions. Due to the nature of his progression through the youth departments, he held the unusual distinction of having played in a different league every season from 2008 to 2016 without interruption: five youth year levels ending with the División de Honor Juvenil de Fútbol, fourth level with Basconia, divisions two and three with the reserves and top tier with the senior team. However, the run was halted abruptly on 23 December 2016, when the club announced he had been diagnosed with testicular cancer and would undergo surgery within the next week; he returned to action on 4 February 2017 after only 46 days, playing the full 90 minutes in a 3–0 loss at FC Barcelona, and five days later, he extended his contract until 2022.

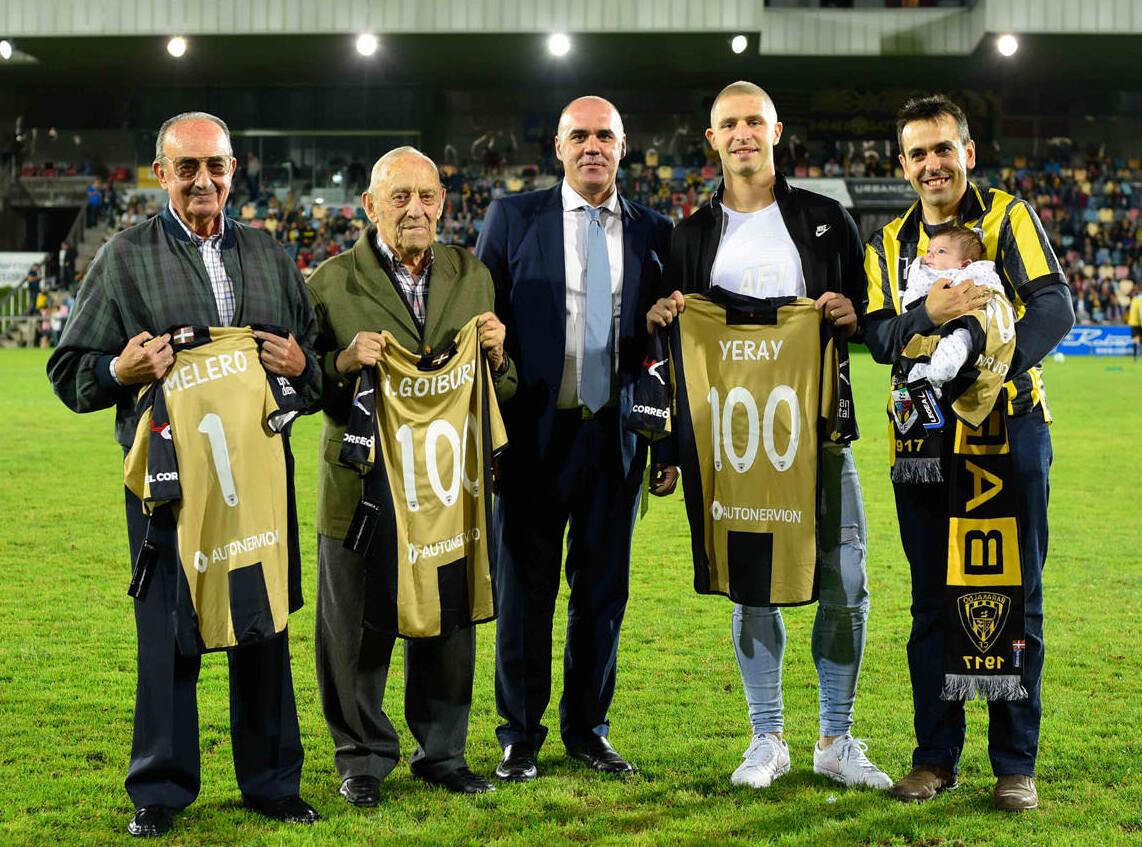
Yeray (second from right) with hometown club Barakaldo's oldest and youngest supporters as part of their centenary event in October 2017

On 12 June 2017, tests found further cancerous abnormalities, resulting in Yeray having to undergo chemotherapy treatment. On his return to the club's training centre the following month, he was greeted by the entire playing squad, who had all shaved their heads in a gesture of solidarity. On 20 December, he captained the Athletic under-23s in a win over Swansea City in the Premier League International Cup (a reserves tournament). 259 days after his last appearance, he made his return with the senior team on 4 February 2018 (exactly one year after his first comeback match, both fixtures by strange coincidence taking place on World Cancer Day), playing the entirety of a 2–0 domestic league defeat away to Girona.

Yeray agreed to a new seven-year deal on 18 July 2019, keeping him at the San Mamés Stadium until 2026 and with a release clause set at €70m. He scored his first competitive goal for the first team on 25 January 2021, heading home a cross from Iker Muniain for his team's second in an eventual 5–1 home victory against Getafe CF.

On 31 May 2023, Yeray underwent surgery to address the pubalgia problems that were preventing him from playing regularly. On 6 October, he suffered a muscle injury to his thigh that also required operation and kept him out for four months. In March 2024, another muscle ailment prevented him from participating in the final of the Copa del Rey against RCD Mallorca.

Yeray made his 250th competitive appearance for Athletic on 30 March 2025, in a 0–0 home draw with CA Osasuna. In July, he released a statement announcing that he had been provisionally suspended after failing a doping test following the Europa League semi-final loss to Manchester United on 1 May – the banned substance was believed to be in a medicine to combat alopecia, a condition which he had been experiencing since his cancer treatment; on 8 September, he was handed a ten-month suspension.

On 2 February 2026, Yeray was allowed to return to training. As also previously dictated by the ban, he was able to play two months later.

== International career ==
On 23 March 2017, Yeray made his debut for the Spain under-21 team in a friendly match against Denmark. He was selected in the squad for that year's UEFA European Championships, before withdrawing due to illness prior to the start of the tournament.

Even though he was not part of the squad of 23 for the 2018 FIFA World Cup finals, Yeray was picked by full side manager Julen Lopetegui for a friendly with Switzerland to be held on 3 June. He remained an unused substitute in the 1–1 draw.

Yeray also played for the unofficial Basque Country team, making his debut against Costa Rica in November 2020.

== Career statistics ==
As of match played 21 October 2026

Appearances and goals by club, season and competition
| Club | Season | League | | | Copa del Rey | | Europe | | Other | | Total | |
| Club | Season | Division | Apps | Goals | Apps | Goals | Apps | Goals | Apps | Goals | Apps | Goals |
|---|---|---|---|---|---|---|---|---|---|---|---|---|
| Basconia | 2013–14 | Tercera División | 26 | 0 | — | | — | | — | | 26 | 0 |
| Bilbao Athletic | 2014–15 | Segunda División B | 30 | 1 | — | | — | | 6 (Note: Appearances in Segunda División B play-offs) | 0 | 36 | 1 |
| Bilbao Athletic | 2015–16 | Segunda División | 32 | 0 | — | | — | | — | | 32 | 0 |
| Bilbao Athletic | Total | | 62 | 1 | 0 | 0 | 0 | 0 | 6 | 0 | 68 | 1 |
| Athletic Bilbao | 2016–17 | La Liga | 26 | 0 | 1 | 0 | 8 (Note: Appearances in UEFA Europa League) | 0 | — | | 35 | 0 |
| Athletic Bilbao | 2017–18 | La Liga | 8 | 0 | 0 | 0 | 4 | 0 | — | | 12 | 0 |
| Athletic Bilbao | 2018–19 | La Liga | 30 | 0 | 2 | 0 | — | | — | | 32 | 0 |
| Athletic Bilbao | 2019–20 | La Liga | 32 | 0 | 6 (Note: Includes appearance in 2020 Copa del Rey final (played in 2021)) | 0 | — | | — | | 38 | 0 |
| Athletic Bilbao | 2020–21 | La Liga | 23 | 1 | 6 | 0 | — | | 1 (Note: Appearances in Supercopa de España) | 0 | 30 | 1 |
| Athletic Bilbao | 2021–22 | La Liga | 22 | 0 | 3 | 0 | — | | 2 | 1 | 27 | 1 |
| Athletic Bilbao | 2022–23 | La Liga | 28 | 1 | 5 | 0 | — | | — | | 33 | 1 |
| Athletic Bilbao | 2023–24 | La Liga | 19 | 0 | 2 | 0 | — | | — | | 21 | 0 |
| Athletic Bilbao | 2024–25 | La Liga | 21 | 1 | 1 | 0 | 7 | 1 | — | | 29 | 2 |
| Athletic Bilbao | 2025–26 | La Liga | 7 | 0 | — | | — | | — | | 7 | 0 |
| Athletic Bilbao | 2026–27 | La Liga | 5 | 0 | 0 | 0 | — | | — | | 5 | 0 |
| Athletic Bilbao | Total | | 221 | 3 | 26 | 0 | 19 | 1 | 3 | 1 | 269 | 5 |
| Career total | | | 309 | 4 | 26 | 0 | 19 | 1 | 9 | 1 | 363 | 6 |

== Honours ==
Athletic Bilbao

- Copa del Rey: 2023–24; runner-up: 2019–20, 2020–21
- Supercopa de España: 2021; runner-up: 2022
