= 2021 Supercopa de España =

Football tournament in Spain

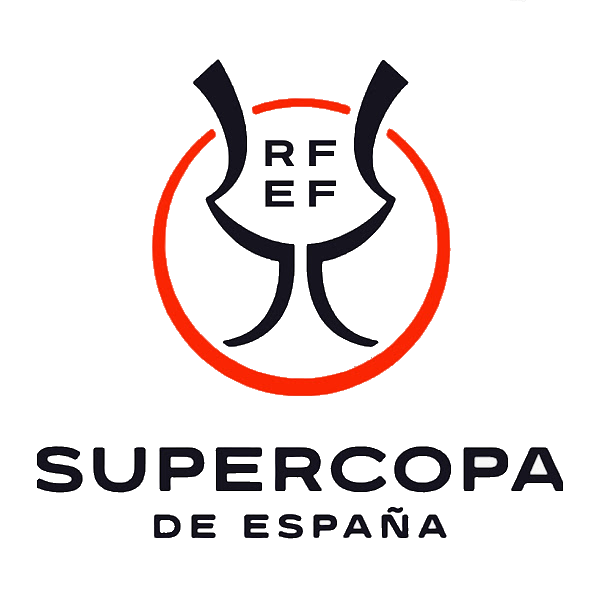

Tournament details
- Host country: Spain
- Dates: 13–17 January 2021
- Teams: 4
- Venues: 3 (in 3 host cities)

Final positions
- Champions: Athletic Bilbao (3rd title)
- Runners-up: Barcelona

Tournament statistics
- Matches played: 3
- Goals scored: 10 (3.33 per match)
- Attendance: 0 (0 per match)
- Top scorer(s): Raúl García; Antoine Griezmann (2 goals each)

The 2021 Supercopa de España was the 37th edition of the Supercopa de España, an annual football competition for clubs in the Spanish football league system that were successful in its major competitions in the preceding season.

It was the second straight edition played under the new format with four teams. They included 2019–20 Copa del Rey winners Real Sociedad, 2019–20 La Liga winners Real Madrid, 2019–20 Copa del Rey runners-up Athletic Bilbao and 2019–20 La Liga runners-up Barcelona. The competition was initially supposed to be held in Saudi Arabia like the previous year, but restrictions related to the global COVID-19 pandemic forced it to remain in Spain. The semi-finals took place in the Andalusian cities of Córdoba and Málaga, on 13 and 14 January 2021. The final was played at Estadio de La Cartuja in Seville on 17 January 2021.

Athletic Bilbao won the tournament for their third Supercopa de España title.

== Qualification ==
The tournament featured the winners and runners-up of the 2019–20 Copa del Rey (Note: Outcome of the 2020 Copa del Rey final was not known at the time of the 2021 Supercopa de España being played, reaching it granted qualification to both finalists.) and 2019–20 La Liga.

=== Qualified teams ===
The following four teams qualified for the tournament.

Team	Method of qualification	Appearance	Last appearance as	Previous performance		
Team	Method of qualification	Appearance	Last appearance as	Winner(s)	Runners-up	Semi-finalists
Real Sociedad	2019–20 Copa del Rey winners	2nd	1982 winners	1	–	–
Real Madrid	2019–20 La Liga winners	17th	2020 winners	11	5	–
Athletic Bilbao	2019–20 Copa del Rey runners-up	5th	2015 winners	2	2	–
Barcelona	2019–20 La Liga runners-up	25th	2020 semi-finalists	13	10	1

== Draw ==
The draw took place on 17 December 2020 at the Royal Spanish Football Federation headquarters, in La Ciudad del Fútbol. As the result of the delayed 2020 Copa del Rey Final was unknown at the moment of the draw, it was held under the condition that both teams qualifying through their La Liga result (Real Madrid and Barcelona) could not face each other in the semi-finals.

== Matches ==
=== Bracket ===
Semi-finals
13 January 2021 – Córdoba
Real Sociedad	1 (2)
Barcelona (p)	1 (3)
14 January 2021 – Málaga
Real Madrid	1
Athletic Bilbao	2

Final
17 January 2021 – Seville
Barcelona	2
Athletic Bilbao (a.e.t.)	3

=== Semi-finals ===
13 January 2021
21:00

Real Sociedad	1–1 (a.e.t.)	Barcelona
Oyarzabal 51' (pen.)	Report	De Jong 39'
Penalties
Bautista (penalty missed); Oyarzabal (penalty missed); Willian José (penalty missed); Merino (penalty scored); Januzaj (penalty scored)	2–3	(penalty missed) De Jong; (penalty scored) Dembélé; (penalty scored) Pjanić; (penalty missed) Griezmann; (penalty scored) Puig

Nuevo Arcángel, Córdoba
Attendance: 0 (Note: The match was played behind closed doors due to the COVID-19 pandemic in Spain.)
Referee: José Luis Munuera Montero (Andalusia)

14 January 2021
21:00

Real Madrid	1–2	Athletic Bilbao
Benzema 73'	Report	R. García 18', 38' (pen.)

La Rosaleda, Málaga
Attendance: 0
Referee: Juan Martínez Munuera (Valencian Community)

=== Final ===
17 January 2021
21:00

Barcelona	2–3 (a.e.t.)	Athletic Bilbao
Griezmann 40', 77'	Report	De Marcos 42'; Villalibre 90'; Williams 93'

La Cartuja, Seville
Attendance: 0
Referee: Jesús Gil Manzano (Extremadura)

== See also ==
- 2020–21 La Liga
- 2020–21 Copa del Rey
