= Basque derby =

Football derby between Real Sociedad and Athletic Bilbao

- Location: Basque Country, Spain
- Teams: Athletic Bilbao; Real Sociedad
- First meeting: 4 April 1909; Copa del Rey; Club Ciclista 4–2 Athletic Bilbao
- Latest meeting: 1 November 2026; 2026–27 La Liga; Athletic Bilbao 2–1 Real Sociedad
- Next meeting: 2 May 2027; 2026–27 La Liga; Real Sociedad v Athletic Bilbao
- Stadiums: San Mamés (Bilbao); Anoeta (San Sebastian)

Statistics
- Total meetings: 198
- Most wins: Athletic Bilbao (81)
- Top scorer: Telmo Zarra; Jesús María Satrústegui (14 each)
- Largest victory: Athletic Bilbao 7–0 Real Sociedad; 2 March 1935
- Location of the two teams' stadia

The Basque derby (Basque: Euskal Derbia; Spanish: derbi Vasco) is the name of the football local derby between Real Sociedad and Athletic Bilbao. It embodies the inter-city rivalry between Bilbao and Donostia-San Sebastián, respectively the capitals of the neighbouring provinces of Biscay (Bizkaia) and Gipuzkoa in the Basque Country region of Spain. It is also occasionally referred to as the AP-8 derby, referring to the name of the highway which connects the cities.

== Background ==
The derby was first played in April 1909 and has attracted the attention of local football fans ever since. These two organisations are the largest football clubs in the Basque Country and have stayed in the top division of Spanish football for longer than most clubs, winning several trophies in the last hundred years. Both enjoyed a period of great success in the early 1980s, winning four national titles in succession between them, whilst using only local players.

Other clubs in the territory have also competed in the top division (and opposed Real Sociedad occasionally in the second tier, in addition to cup ties), with CA Osasuna, Deportivo Alavés, and SD Eibar the most prominent of these; the matches between any of them are also referred to as a “Basque derby”.

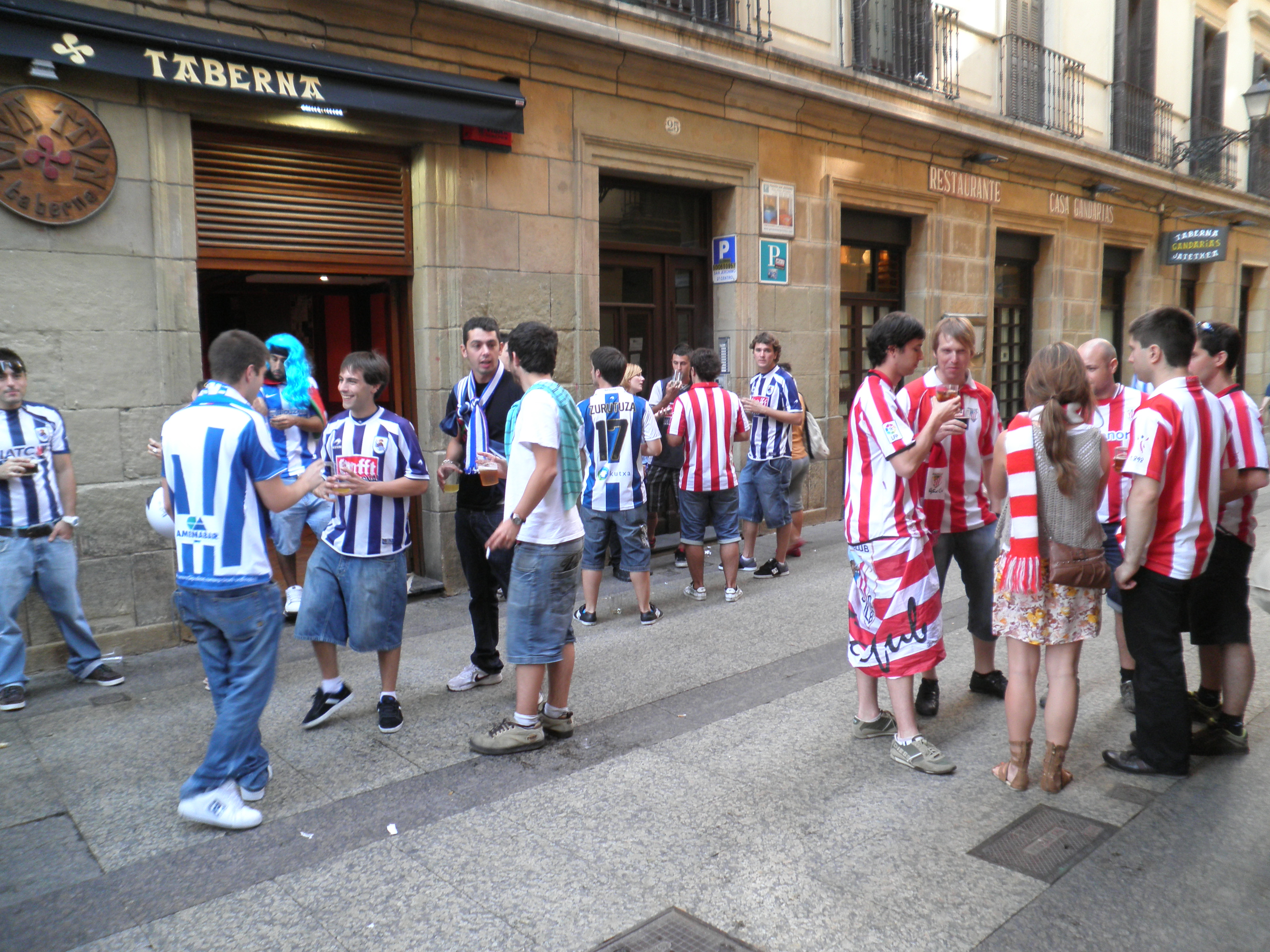
Rival supporters socialising together pre-match in San Sebastián, October 2011

Supporters of both teams traditionally mix in and around the stadiums on matchdays, somewhat unusually for a local derby, and take part in organised accompanying events such as a 'kalijera' (a supporters' parade from the city centre to the stadium) and the 'Bertso-derbia', a singing and poetry contest between the two groups in the style of the traditional Bertsolaritza. The fans have received praise for the relaxed atmosphere which usually accompanies the derby matches, and although incidents have occurred within the stadia, the hostility is usually directed towards rival players rather than fans.

Real Sociedad has played in the second division for some short periods of its history (16 seasons, the longest spell being five years) and for that reason the derby has not always been contested every season. Athletic Bilbao has never been relegated, meaning all their league matches have taken place in the top tier. In the 21st century, there has only been one enforced break in the fixtures, a three-year (1400 days) hiatus between January 2007 and December 2010.

== History ==
=== 1900s cups ===
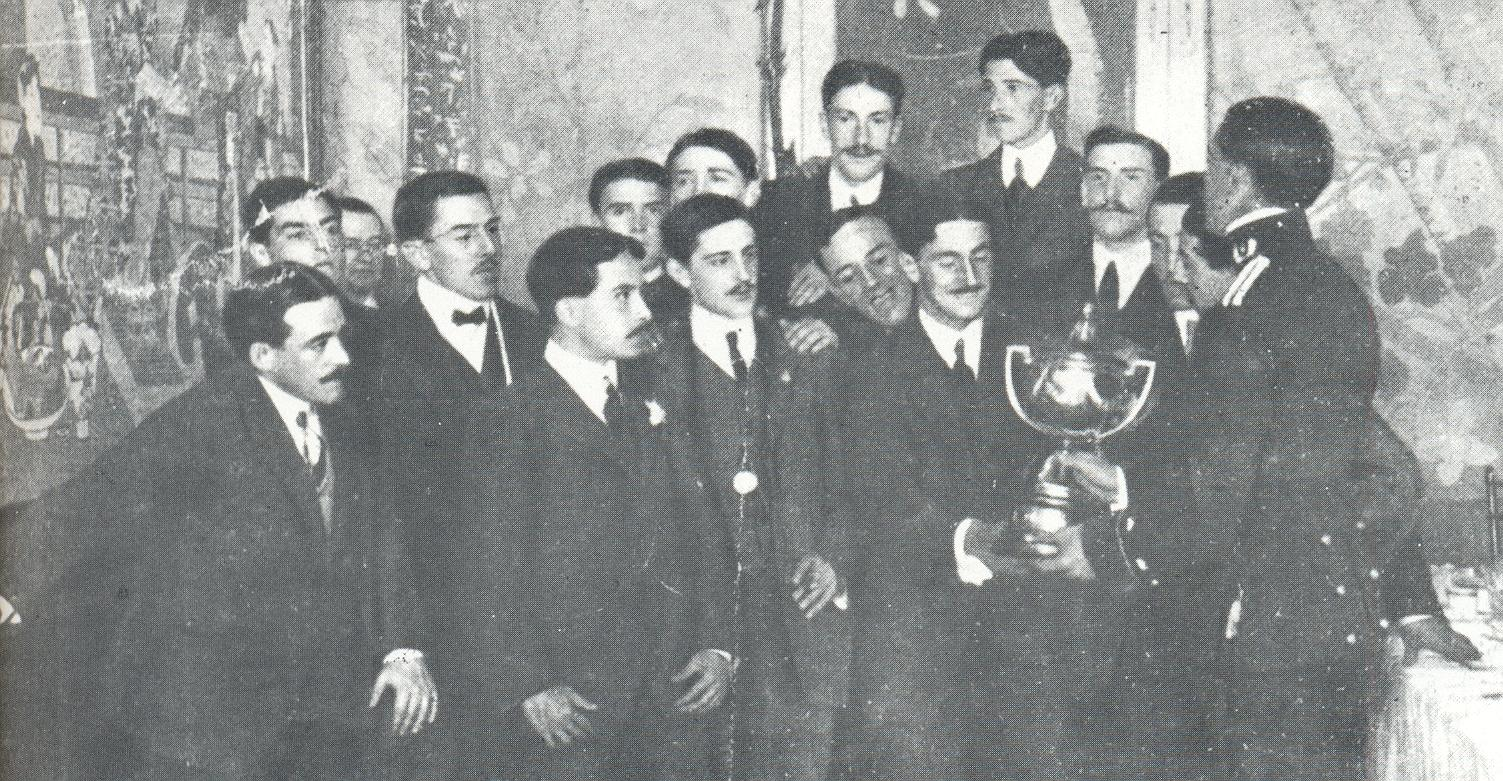
The Club Ciclista de San Sebastián team with the 1909 Copa del Rey

The first meeting between Athletic Bilbao and a team which evolved into Real Sociedad should have taken place in the 1905 Copa del Rey, which consisted of a mini-league with just three teams: Athletic, hosts Madrid F.C. and San Sebastián Recreation Club. After Madrid defeated both Basque teams, Athletic declined to play the dead rubber between them. Despite this withdrawal, however, the federation considers Athletic to be the runners-up in the tournament as it was their match with Madrid which confirmed the latter as the winners.

By the 1909 event, the Recreation Club had evolved into San Sebastián Foot-Ball Club but aligned with Club Ciclista de San Sebastián to meet the entry requirements. They defeated Athletic in the opening round and went on to win the trophy.

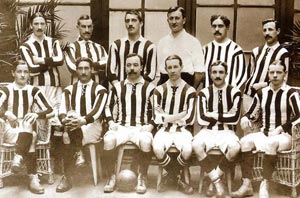
Athletic Bilbao's 1910 Copa del Rey-winning team

The following year, the club was renamed Sociedad de Foot-Ball de San Sebastián and had received royal patronage, entitling it to add the prefix Real. However a dispute occurred over the entitlement of Real Sociedad to claim the honour of champions, and two separate competitions were held (both of which were later declared official, meaning there are two 1910 winners). Although Real Sociedad hosted their version of the competition at their Ondarreta ground, once again they did not meet the requisite statutes and their players joined with another club to participate, this time Vasconia Sporting Club. Once more it was a three-team league involving Athletic Bilbao and Madrid, with Athletic winning both of their matches to win the cup, with the decisive win being over Vasconia who are thus listed as runners-up (and in any case they beat Madrid to confirm that status).

In the 1911 Copa del Rey, Real Sociedad withdrew in protest after their accusations that other teams, primarily Athletic Bilbao, were using ineligible foreign players, were rejected. Athletic went on to win the trophy without using the disputed players, although they did use some from Atlético Madrid which at that time was a branch of the older Bilbao club. This led to the Royal Spanish Football Federation introducing a rule for the next year's competition that all players must be Spanish citizens. Athletic chose to maintain the approach of using only local Basque players even when the regulations were relaxed some years later, a tradition which has continued into the 21st century. Real had a similar policy from the late 1960s, but it was dropped for foreign imports in 1989 when they signed the Republic of Ireland forward John Aldridge, and for non-Basque Spanish players in 2002 with the transfer of Boris from Real Oviedo.

=== Regional leagues ===
Comparison of Athletic Club and La Real's finishing positions

In October 1913, a friendly was held between the two teams to inaugurate Real Sociedad's Atotxa Stadium; the result was a 3–3 draw and the first goalscorer at the stadium was Pichichi, Athletic's legendary forward of the age who had also been the first scorer in the opening match at Athletic Bilbao's own new ground, San Mames, two months earlier. In the same year, regional league competitions were introduced to the area to determine the qualifying teams for the Copa del Rey. In the first three seasons, Athletic Bilbao and Real Sociedad were in the same competition, but due to repeated disputes by the rival provinces, these separated into the Biscay Championship – dominated by Athletic and Arenas Club de Getxo – and the Gipuzkoa Championship – usually won by Real Sociedad or Real Unión – which ran in parallel for sixteen years.

In 1934 the top six clubs in the region, including Athletic and Real (then known as Donostia FC under the Second Spanish Republic which rejected regal names), were involved in the Basque Cup which ran until 1936 when the Spanish Civil War brought an end to organised football for three years. At the end of the conflict, the regional championships were re-instated for two further seasons, with Atlético de Bilbao (another renaming, this time an order of Franco's regime prohibiting non-Spanish words that lasted until the 1970s) and Real Sociedad kept apart. By then, the national league was well established, with the clubs' first meeting in that competition occurring in February 1929.

In 1969, the rare possibility of a Basque cup final was ended when Elche defeated Real Sociedad in the semi-finals before losing to Athletic Bilbao in Madrid. This was a repeat of the events of the 1958 competition when Real Madrid beat Real Sociedad but lost to Athletic, while in 1965 both Basque clubs had been eliminated in the semi-finals.

=== Later history ===
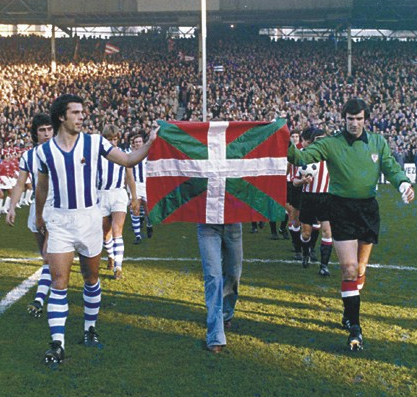
1976-77 flag display

Both clubs are proud of their Basque identity; in addition to employing a cantera system for developing local players, in 1976 their captains Inaxio Kortabarria and José Ángel Iribar famously led the teams onto the field displaying the banned Ikurriña (Basque flag) following the death of General Franco. Real Sociedad proved far superior on the pitch that day, winning 5–0, their biggest-ever derby victory up to that point (they eventually matched it in 1995).

Although Real Sociedad nowadays select foreign players, both clubs usually incorporate the Ikurriña on their kit and the captains' armbands invariably feature the flag, while mutual displays by the players, such as support for an official Basque Country national team, are often seen.

In October 1970 the clubs had met in a friendly to mark the installation of floodlights at SD Eibar's stadium, Ipurua, won by Athletic on a penalty shoot-out after a 1–1 draw. In competitive games, penalties would become a fairly common feature of cup ties with three taking place in consecutive meetings (1975, 1982, 1984), two of which were also won by Athletic.

In terms of results sequences in the league, Real Sociedad hold two accolades: longest unbeaten league run of 15 matches, 1993 to 2000 (Athletic's best is 11, 1958 to 1968) and consecutive home wins with 14, between 1969 and 1982 (Athletic achieved 5 between 2002 and 2005). Athletic hold the record for consecutive league victories in either city, with a fairly modest seven wins spanning either side of the Civil War (1934 to 1944).

Although both clubs have been fairly successful at various points in their history, only five derby matches have taken place with both clubs placed in the top five league positions at the time: 1979–80, 1981–82 (when Real Sociedad won the title with a derby win on the final day), 1987–88, 1997–98 and 2013–14.

In 2016, an annual friendly match was established incorporating the results of the Basque derby, as well as other league fixtures between teams in the region, with the two clubs holding the best records being invited to play in the 'final' prior to the start of the following season. Although Real Sociedad finished 6th in 2016–17, the highest among Basque teams, their record against their neighbours was inferior to those of Athletic Bilbao and Alavés (the match between them in Barakaldo was not completed due to indiscipline among the players). The second edition did feature Athletic v Real, with the Bilbao team winning 1–0 in Irun. The third was won by Eibar over Real Sociedad, who finally took the title at the fourth attempt in 2020 by beating Osasuna.

=== Copa del Rey final ===
Both teams qualified for the 2020 Copa del Rey final, the first ever Basque derby showdown (disregarding the mini-league involving Athletic and Vasconia in 1910). Originally scheduled for 18 April, the fixture was postponed due to the escalating COVID-19 pandemic in Spain which had led to other matches being cancelled or played in an empty stadium, something the clubs wished to avoid, particularly given the significance of the match. It was eventually played – in an empty stadium – 350 days after its original date, on 3 April 2021. In a tense match featuring several players with ties to the opposition, and which produced many fouls and few chances, Mikel Oyarzabal scored the only goal – from a penalty – to give Real Sociedad a historic victory and their first major trophy since 1987.

=== Players and coaches with both clubs ===
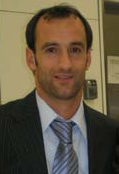
Joseba Etxeberria moved between the clubs in 1995

Several players have played for both clubs, such as Loren Juarros, Joseba Etxeberria and Iban Zubiaurre whose direct transfers from Real to Athletic caused deep resentment and a cooling of the fraternal relationship between the clubs (and in the case of the latter, a lawsuit regarding the legality of the deal). By contrast, Bittor Alkiza's move was better received, and he later returned to San Sebastián. Others who made the move, almost all from Real to Athletic, include Luciano Iturrino, David Billabona, Andoni Imaz, Igor Gabilondo, Iñigo Díaz de Cerio, Xabier Castillo, Gorka Elustondo and Mikel Balenziaga.

In January 2018, Iñigo Martínez made the same move, with his transfer only made possible by Athletic paying his €32 million contractual release clause amount, making it impossible for Real Sociedad to reject the approach. In turn, the buying club only had the sufficient financial means due to receiving approximately double that amount the same day for Aymeric Laporte who moved to Manchester City, also via his release clause. Real Sociedad's response to the defection of Martínez – who had previously been quoted as saying he would never move to Athletic Bilbao – was to offer a new replica jersey to all supporters who presented an older one with his name on the back at the club shops, with the process titled 'He's history'. In addition to being the most expensive move between two Basque clubs, the Martínez fee was the new record for spending by Athletic (the Laporte deal became the record amount received by them); Real Sociedad had received slightly more in 2013 when Asier Illarramendi transferred to Real Madrid.

Eight coaches have been in charge of both clubs, including Rafael Iriondo, José María Amorrortu, Javier Irureta and Javier Clemente who are better known for their spells with Athletic Bilbao, whereas Salvador Artigas had a more significant association with the Txuriurdin; the others are Lippo Hertzka, Antonio Barrios and Baltasar Albéniz.

=== Scoring records ===
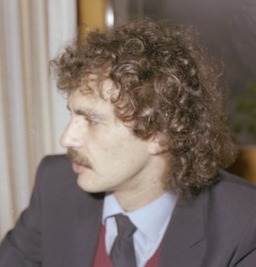
Jesús María Satrústegui has 14 goals in the fixture for Real Sociedad

The top scorers in the fixture are Athletic's Zarra and Real's Jesús María Satrústegui, both on 14, with Zarra's all scored in the league and Satrus with 13 in the league and one in the cup. Dani has 13, with nine of those in the league.

Zarra is the player with the most goals scored in a match, netting five times in his team's 7–1 victory in 1951. Athletic had previously achieved a 7–1 (in San Sebastián) in 1930, and won 6–1 in the match in Bilbao later that same year. However, their record margin of victory was 7–0 in 1935, with Bata getting three. Real's player scoring record in a single match was 3 goals, set by George McGuinness in their first-ever cup tie in 1909, later matched in the league in 1932 by Cholín and in 1995 by Meho Kodro, whose hat-trick in the 5–0 home win contributed to his transfer to FC Barcelona at the end of that season, giving him no further opportunity to add to his derby goals tally. In a twist of irony for the derby, Meho's son Kenan later played for Athletic.

== Statistics ==
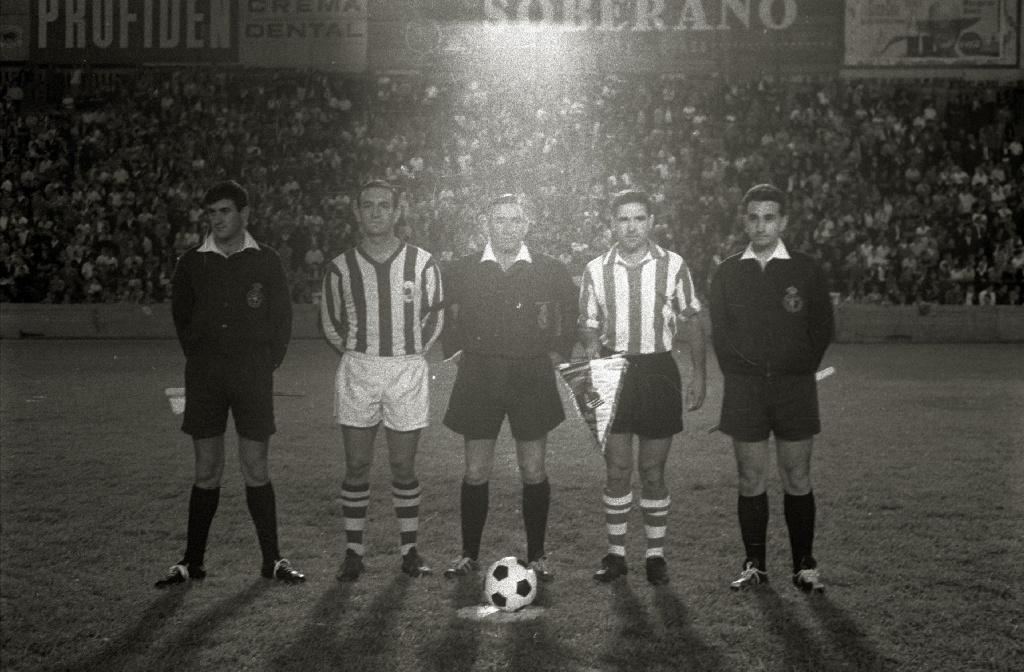
Basque derby at Atotxa, 1965

As of 1 November 2026

Competition (Note: The clubs have never met in UEFA or other international competitions, nor in the Supercopa de España)	Pld	ATH	D	RS	ATG	RSG
La Liga	159	64	41	54	255	212
Copa del Rey (Note: Includes matches in the 1909 Copa del Rey and 1910 Copa del Rey in which Real Sociedad competed as part of Club Ciclista de San Sebastián and Vasconia respectively)	23	9	6	8	27	23
Copa de la Liga	2	0	1	1	3	4
North Championship	8	4	3	1	13	7
Basque Cup	4	4	0	0	19	0
Champions Trophy	2	0	1	1	5	7
Total	198	81	52	65	322	253

== List of official matches ==
=== La Liga ===
Season	Date	Home team	Away team	Score	Home goal scorers	Away goal scorers
1928–29	10 February 1929	Real Sociedad	Athletic Bilbao	1–1	Bienzobas (30)	Bergareche (43)
1928–29	28 April 1929	Athletic Bilbao	Real Sociedad	4–2	Unamuno (34, 66), Juanín (50 p.), Mandalúniz (73)	Cholín (8), Kiriki (33)
1929–30	15 December 1929	Athletic Bilbao	Real Sociedad	2–2	Zaldúa (14 o.g.), Unamuno (63)	Ayestarán (2, 44)
1929–30	16 February 1930	Real Sociedad	Athletic Bilbao	1–7 (Note: Joint-most goals in a match (8))	Cholín (16)	Gorostiza (19, 57, 66), Irargorri (21, 28, 52), Unamuno (59)
1930–31	14 December 1930	Athletic Bilbao	Real Sociedad	6–1	Uribe (14, 50), Garizurieta (30), Gorostiza (49, 85) Bata (66)	Labarta (8 p.)
1930–31	15 February 1931	Real Sociedad	Athletic Bilbao	1–0	Bienzobas (28)	—
1931–32	10 January 1932	Athletic Bilbao	Real Sociedad	5–1	Lafuente (2, 33), Uribe (20, 42), Roberto (31)	Chivero (30)
1931–32	13 March 1932	Real Sociedad	Athletic Bilbao	3–2	Cholín (22, 30, 59)	Bata (24, 66)
1932–33	1 January 1933	Real Sociedad	Athletic Bilbao	2–4	Tolete (19), Chivero (30)	José Iraragorri (5), Gorostiza (58, 62), Bata (89)
1932–33	5 March 1933	Athletic Bilbao	Real Sociedad	1–2	Bata (18)	Santiago Urtizberea (5, 60)
1933–34	17 December 1933	Real Sociedad	Athletic Bilbao	3–0	Ortega (23), Ipiña (38, 73)	—
1933–34	18 February 1934	Athletic Bilbao	Real Sociedad	2–1	Gorostiza (30), Bata (73)	Ipiña (20)
1934–35	3 February 1935	Athletic Bilbao	Real Sociedad	7–0 (Note: Biggest margin of victory)	Elices (7, 68), Bata (12, 42, 82), Careaga (47), Mandalúniz (76)	—
1934–35	21 April 1935	Real Sociedad	Athletic Bilbao	0–4	—	Iraragorri (24), Aromas (56), Careaga (64), Cilaurren (76 p.)
1941–42	26 October 1941	Athletic Bilbao	Real Sociedad	4–1	Zarra (41, 72), Iriondo (53), Panizo (68)	Chipia (66)
1941–42	1 February 1942	Real Sociedad	Athletic Bilbao	0–1	—	Iriondo (12)
1943–44	19 December 1943	Real Sociedad	Athletic Bilbao	1–4	Teran (70 p.)	Iriondo (30), Zarra (63), Panizo (65, 75)
1943–44	2 April 1944	Athletic Bilbao	Real Sociedad	3–0	Escudero (32, 86), Panizo (36 p.)	—
1947–48	28 September 1947	Athletic Bilbao	Real Sociedad	1–3	Aldecoa (20)	Vázquez (24), Castivia (55 p., 73)
1947–48	11 January 1948	Real Sociedad	Athletic Bilbao	0–3	—	Panizo (21), Iriondo (72), Zarra (89)
1949–50	11 September 1949	Real Sociedad	Athletic Bilbao	2–3	Gastón (26), Pérez Medrano (51)	Venancio (10, 74), Bilbao Menchaca (51)
1949–50	18 December 1949	Athletic Bilbao	Real Sociedad	5–2	Gaínza (6), Zarra (46, 62, 88), Venancio (60)	Basabe (10), Caeiro (71)
1950–51	29 October 1950	Real Sociedad	Athletic Bilbao	3–0	Epi (21, 71), Caeiro (59)	—
1950–51	4 March 1951	Athletic Bilbao	Real Sociedad	7–1 (Note: Joint-most goals in a match (8))	Zarra (1, 33 p., 68 p., 80, 83), Canito (27), Panizo (61)	Epi (76)
1951–52	16 December 1951	Real Sociedad	Athletic Bilbao	1–4	Gaínza (27)	Tini (25, 31, 65), Ontoria (61 p.)
1951–52	13 April 1952	Athletic Bilbao	Real Sociedad	4–1	Gaínza (3), Tini (43, 88), Iriondo (80)	Basabe (55)
1952–53	28 September 1952	Real Sociedad	Athletic Bilbao	3–1	Galardi (56), Silvestre Igoa (68, 74)	Venancio (40)
1952–53	1 February 1953	Athletic Bilbao	Real Sociedad	6–1	Gaínza (18), Iriondo (36), Panizo (47, 74), Zarra (52, 52)	Epi (75)
1953–54	29 November 1953	Athletic Bilbao	Real Sociedad	1–3	Maguregui (28)	Paz (49), Canito (76 o.g.), Iriondo (77)
1953–54	28 March 1954	Real Sociedad	Athletic Bilbao	1–1	Zubillaga (30)	Maguregui (74)
1954–55	5 December 1954	Real Sociedad	Athletic Bilbao	3–3	Laguardia (20, 25), Echeveste (50)	Marcaida (7), Venancio (30), Artetxe (39)
1954–55	27 March 1955	Athletic Bilbao	Real Sociedad	1–0	Artetxe (70)	—
1955–56	30 October 1955	Athletic Bilbao	Real Sociedad	3–0	Serafín Areta (33), Artetxe (40), Maguregui (50)	—
1955–56	4 March 1956	Real Sociedad	Athletic Bilbao	2–2	Igoa (47), Maiztegui (89)	Artetxe (50), Uribe (85)
1956–57	21 October 1956	Real Sociedad	Athletic Bilbao	3–4	Laguardia (23, 37, 75)	Artetxe (3), Merodio (26), Maguregui (36), Mauri (42)
1956–57	10 February 1957	Athletic Bilbao	Real Sociedad	2–0	Marcaida (13, 51)	—
1957–58	1 December 1957	Athletic Bilbao	Real Sociedad	2–2	Uribe(61 p., 73 p.)	Laguardia (15), Peporro (55 p.)
1957–58	30 March 1958	Real Sociedad	Athletic Bilbao	1–0	Sarasqueta (28)	—
1958–59	9 November 1958	Real Sociedad	Athletic Bilbao	1–1	Gordejuela (46)	Mauri (39)
1958–59	8 March 1959	Athletic Bilbao	Real Sociedad	1–0	Uribe(65 p.)	—
1959–60	4 October 1959	Athletic Bilbao	Real Sociedad	4–0	Arieta (22), Marcaida (56, 57, 68)	—
1959–60	24 January 1960	Real Sociedad	Athletic Bilbao	1–3	Paz (61)	Marcaida (14), Beitia (18), Arieta (34)
1960–61	27 November 1960	Athletic Bilbao	Real Sociedad	2–2	Zorriketa (40), Arteche (75)	Etura (82 o.g.), Aguirregabiria (89)
1960–61	19 March 1961	Real Sociedad	Athletic Bilbao	0–0	—	—
1961–62	17 September 1961	Athletic Bilbao	Real Sociedad	3–3	Merodio (51), Uribe (52), Aguirre (75)	Villa (24, 89), Cacho (64)
1961–62	7 January 1962	Real Sociedad	Athletic Bilbao	0–2	—	Arteche (11), Arieta (14)
1967–68	12 November 1967	Real Sociedad	Athletic Bilbao	1–1	Silvestre (46)	Uriarte (14)
1967–68	3 March 1968	Athletic Bilbao	Real Sociedad	1–1	Koldo Aguirre (57)	Mendiluce (72)
1968–69	1 December 1968	Athletic Bilbao	Real Sociedad	3–1	Argoitia (3, 31), Estéfano (40)	Arregui (37 p.)
1968–69	23 March 1969	Real Sociedad	Athletic Bilbao	2–0	Uriarte (20, 29)	—
1969–70	16 November 1969	Athletic Bilbao	Real Sociedad	1–0	Igartua (85)	—
1969–70	15 March 1970	Real Sociedad	Athletic Bilbao	2–0	Arambarri (38), Aranguren (45 o.g.)	—
1970–71	13 December 1970	Real Sociedad	Athletic Bilbao	2–1	Boronat (69), Corcuera (74)	Argoitia (12)
1970–71	4 April 1971	Athletic Bilbao	Real Sociedad	1–1	Zubiaga (82)	Boronat (89)
1971–72	6 January 1972	Athletic Bilbao	Real Sociedad	1–2	Uriarte (58)	Ansola (38, 57)
1971–72	7 May 1972	Real Sociedad	Athletic Bilbao	1–0	Corcuera (80 p.)	—
1972–73	7 January 1973	Athletic Bilbao	Real Sociedad	2–1	Lasa(78), Txetxu Rojo (84)	Boronat (25)
1972–73	20 May 1973	Real Sociedad	Athletic Bilbao	1–0	Muruzábal (29)	—
1973–74	16 September 1973	Real Sociedad	Athletic Bilbao	2–1	Amas (11), Ansola (81)	Txetxu Rojo (67)
1973–74	27 January 1974	Athletic Bilbao	Real Sociedad	1–2	Uriarte (33)	Amas (1, 69)
1974–75	12 January 1975	Real Sociedad	Athletic Bilbao	3–0	L. Murillo (18, 52), Araquistáin(60)	—
1974–75	18 May 1975	Athletic Bilbao	Real Sociedad	2–1 (Note: Athletic assured survival in the 1974–75 La Liga)	Gaztelu (46, 63)	Carlos Ruiz (63)
1975–76	30 November 1975	Athletic Bilbao	Real Sociedad	2–0	Dani (50), Irureta (58)	—
1975–76	28 March 1976	Real Sociedad	Athletic Bilbao	3–2	Muruzábal (11, 59, 83 p.)	Otaolea (3), Irureta (71)
1976–77	5 December 1976	Real Sociedad	Athletic Bilbao	5–0	Gaztelu (3, 88 p.), Satrústegui (27, 31), Zamorra (72)	—
1976–77	24 April 1977	Athletic Bilbao	Real Sociedad	4–2	Churruca (1), Carlos Ruiz (38), Dani (57 p., 60)	Satrústegui (2, 25)
1977–78	8 January 1978	Athletic Bilbao	Real Sociedad	1–0	Dani (8)	—
1977–78	30 April 1978	Real Sociedad	Athletic Bilbao	2–1	Satrústegui (35, 53)	Dani (63)
1978–79	21 January 1979	Real Sociedad	Athletic Bilbao	2–1	Satrústegui (11), Núñez (72 o.g.)	Dani (89)
1978–79	3/06/1979	Athletic Bilbao	Real Sociedad	1–1	Goikoetxea (54)	Agustín Gajate (75)
1979–80	16 September 1979	Athletic Bilbao	Real Sociedad	0–1	—	Satrústegui (3)
1979–80	3 February 1980	Real Sociedad	Athletic Bilbao	4–0	Satrústegui (14), Zamorra (44), Olaizola (46), Idígoras (87)	—
1980–81	30 November 1980	Real Sociedad	Athletic Bilbao	4–1	Satrústegui (1, 15), López Ufarte (59, 79)	Endika (87)
1980–81	29 March 1981	Athletic Bilbao	Real Sociedad	0–2	—	Satrústegui (57, 89)
1981–82	27 December 1981	Athletic Bilbao	Real Sociedad	1–1	Urkiaga (65)	Kortabarria (49 p.)
1981–82	25 April 1982	Real Sociedad	Athletic Bilbao	2–1 (Note: Real Sociedad were proclaimed champions of the 1981–82 La Liga)	Zamorra (54), López Ufarte (67)	Sarabia (87)
1982–83	19 December 1982	Real Sociedad	Athletic Bilbao	1–1	Uralde (60)	Dani (86)
1982–83	17 April 1983	Athletic Bilbao	Real Sociedad	2–0	Dani (26), Sukia (69 o.g.)	—
1983–84	1 January 1984	Real Sociedad	Athletic Bilbao	0–1	—	Argote (14)
1983–84	29 April 1984	Athletic Bilbao	Real Sociedad	2–1 (Note: Athletic were proclaimed champions of the 1983–84 La Liga)	Liceranzu (18, 79)	López Ufarte (68)
1984–85	21 December 1984	Athletic Bilbao	Real Sociedad	1–1	J. Salinas (14)	López Ufarte (33)
1984–85	17 March 1985	Real Sociedad	Athletic Bilbao	1–2	Uralde (70)	Larrañaha (66 o.g.), J. Salinas (71)
1985–86	10 November 1985	Athletic Bilbao	Real Sociedad	2–0	Endika (4), Sarabia (61)	—
1985–86	9 March 1986	Real Sociedad	Athletic Bilbao	1–0	Uralde (34)	—
1986–87	14 September 1986	Athletic Bilbao	Real Sociedad	1–1	Sarabia (12)	Bakero (26)
1986–87	4 January 1987	Real Sociedad	Athletic Bilbao	2–1	Bakero (40), Mujica (70)	P. Salinas (1),
1987–88	18 October 1987	Athletic Bilbao	Real Sociedad	1–4 (Note: Biggest away win for Real Sociedad)	Andoni Ayarza (77)	Begiristain (9, 88), Loren (20), Bakero (30)
1987–88	6 March 1988	Real Sociedad	Athletic Bilbao	0–1	—	Joseba (9)
1988–89	6 November 1988	Real Sociedad	Athletic Bilbao	1–0	Loinaz (79)	—
1988–89	16 April 1989	Athletic Bilbao	Real Sociedad	2–3	Uralde (71), Garitano (72)	Carlos Martínez (43), Zamorra (52), Loren (84)
1989–90	3 September 1989	Athletic Bilbao	Real Sociedad	1–0	Garitano (59 p.)	—
1989–90	21 January 1990	Real Sociedad	Athletic Bilbao	0–0	—	—
1990–91	25 November 1990	Real Sociedad	Athletic Bilbao	0–1	—	Luke (48)
1990–91	20 April 1991	Athletic Bilbao	Real Sociedad	2–1	Valverde (1), Luke (79)	Atkinson (79)
1991–92	17 November 1991	Real Sociedad	Athletic Bilbao	2–0	Oceano (69 p.), Ziganda (77 o.g.)	—
1991–92	4 April 1992	Athletic Bilbao	Real Sociedad	2–1	Ziganda (65), Garitano (79 p.)	P. Salinas (1 o.g.)
1992–93	18 October 1992	Athletic Bilbao	Real Sociedad	2–0	Valverde (23), Ziganda (39)	—
1992–93	14 March 1993	Real Sociedad	Athletic Bilbao	1–0 (Note: Final derby match at Atotxa Stadium)	Alkiza (19)	—
1993–94	9 January 1994	Athletic Bilbao	Real Sociedad	0–0 (Note: First goalless draw in Bilbao)	—	—
1993–94	8 May 1994	Real Sociedad	Athletic Bilbao	0–0 (Note: First derby match at Anoeta Stadium)	—	—
1994–95	8 January 1995	Athletic Bilbao	Real Sociedad	0–0	—	—
1994–95	28 May 1995	Real Sociedad	Athletic Bilbao	5–0	Kodro (11, 24, 59), De Pedro (17), Idiakez (55)	—
1995–96	7 January 1996	Athletic Bilbao	Real Sociedad	0–0	—	—
1995–96	19 May 1996	Real Sociedad	Athletic Bilbao	2–2	Craioveanu (1), Albístegui (28)	Guerrero (28), Garitano (62 p.)
1996–97	2 October 1996	Athletic Bilbao	Real Sociedad	1–3	Ziganda (35)	Craioveanu (24), De Paula (31), Idiakez (83)
1996–97	2 March 1997	Real Sociedad	Athletic Bilbao	0–0	—	—
1997–98	5 October 1997	Athletic Bilbao	Real Sociedad	1–1	Javi González (39)	Craioveanu (71 p.)
1997–98	8 February 1998	Real Sociedad	Athletic Bilbao	1–1	Javi Gracia (89)	Larrazábal (8)
1998–99	8 November 1998	Real Sociedad	Athletic Bilbao	3–1	De Paula (3), Sá Pinto (12), Kovačević (89)	Larrazábal (14 p.)
1998–99	4 April 1999	Athletic Bilbao	Real Sociedad	0–0	—	—
1999–2000	5 December 1999	Athletic Bilbao	Real Sociedad	1–1	Etxeberria (26)	Aranburu (65)
1999–2000	16 April 2000	Real Sociedad	Athletic Bilbao	4–1	Aranzábal (36), Khokhlov (50), De Pedro (56, 89)	Pikabea (35 o.g.)
2000–01	14 January 2001	Real Sociedad	Athletic Bilbao	0–2	—	Etxeberria (37, 80)
2000–01	16 June 2001	Athletic Bilbao	Real Sociedad	1–3 (Note: Real Sociedad assured survival in the 2000–01 La Liga)	Urzaiz (72)	Jankauskas (29), De Pedro (39), Idiakez (86 p.)
2001–02	26 August 2001	Real Sociedad	Athletic Bilbao	1–3	Khokhlov (17)	Urzaiz (15, 83), Tiko (75)
2001–02	12 January 2002	Athletic Bilbao	Real Sociedad	2–1	Tiko (39, 59)	De Pedro (45)
2002–03	1 September 2002	Real Sociedad	Athletic Bilbao	4–2	Karpin (27), Kahveci (32, 61), Kovačević (75)	Carlos Gurpegi (29, 75)
2002–03	2 February 2003	Athletic Bilbao	Real Sociedad	3–0	Etxeberria (18, 74), Ezquerro (90)	—
2003–04	27 September 2003	Athletic Bilbao	Real Sociedad	1–0	Tiko (80)	—
2003–04	14 February 2004	Real Sociedad	Athletic Bilbao	1–1	Yeste (14)	Kahveci (39)
2004–05	21 November 2004	Real Sociedad	Athletic Bilbao	3–2	Kahveci (57, 62), Gabilondo (73)	Ezquerro (40), Urzaiz (42)
2004–05	9 April 2005	Athletic Bilbao	Real Sociedad	3–0	Ezquerro (36), Yeste (74), Tiko (90+2)	—
2005–06	27 August 2005	Athletic Bilbao	Real Sociedad	3–0	Yeste (47), Llorente (51), Luis Prieto (80)	—
2005–06	22 January 2006	Real Sociedad	Athletic Bilbao	3–3	Kahveci (6, 37), Skoubo (68)	Aduriz (47, 67), Iraola (90+1)
2006–07	27 August 2006	Athletic Bilbao	Real Sociedad	1–1	Aduriz (38)	Aranburu (87)
2006–07	28 January 2007	Real Sociedad	Athletic Bilbao	0–2	—	Iraola (12, 68)
2010–11	5 December 2010	Real Sociedad	Athletic Bilbao	2–0	Prieto (26 p.), San José (49 o.g.)	—
2010–11	23 April 2011	Athletic Bilbao	Real Sociedad	2–1	Muniain (17), Toquero (29)	J. Martínez (31 o.g.)
2011–12	2 October 2011	Real Sociedad	Athletic Bilbao	1–2	I. Martínez (61)	Llorente (34, 70)
2011–12	4 March 2012	Athletic Bilbao	Real Sociedad	2–0	Susaeta (25, 81)	—
2012–13	29 September 2012	Real Sociedad	Athletic Bilbao	2–0	Griezmann (62), Vela (72 p.)	—
2012–13	23 February 2013	Athletic Bilbao	Real Sociedad	1–3 (Note: Final derby match at old San Mamés)	Ibai (30)	Griezmann (34), Agirretxe (67), Vela (76)
2013–14	5 January 2014	Real Sociedad	Athletic Bilbao	2–0	Griezmann (43), Pardo (90+3)	—
2013–14	11 May 2014	Athletic Bilbao	Real Sociedad	1–1 (Note: First derby match at new San Mamés)	Muniain (50)	Agirretxe (75)
2014–15	14 December 2014	Real Sociedad	Athletic Bilbao	1–1	Vela (3)	De Marcos (61)
2014–15	28 April 2015	Athletic Bilbao	Real Sociedad	1–1	Aduriz (52 p.)	De la Bella (60)
2015–16	26 September 2015	Real Sociedad	Athletic Bilbao	0–0	—	—
2015–16	21 February 2016	Athletic Bilbao	Real Sociedad	0–1	—	Jonathas (17)
2016–17	16 October 2016	Athletic Bilbao	Real Sociedad	3–2	Muniain (51), Aduriz (60), Williams (72)	Zurutuza (16), Iñigo Martínez (83)
2016–17	12 March 2017	Real Sociedad	Athletic Bilbao	0–2	—	R. García (28 p.), Williams (56)
2017–18	16 December 2017	Athletic Bilbao	Real Sociedad	0–0	—	—
2017–18	28 April 2018	Real Sociedad	Athletic Bilbao	3–1	San José (15 o.g., 54 o.g.), Oyarzabal (36)	R. García (59 p.)
2018–19	5 October 2018	Athletic Bilbao	Real Sociedad	1–3	Muniain (32)	Oyarzabal (30 p., 74 p.), Sangalli (47)
2018–19	2 February 2019	Real Sociedad	Athletic Bilbao	2–1	Oyarzabal (16), Willian José (45)	R. García (82)
2019–20	30 August 2019	Athletic Bilbao	Real Sociedad	2–0	Williams (11), R. García (29)	
2019–20	9 February 2020	Real Sociedad	Athletic Bilbao	2–1	Portu (65), Isak (83)	Williams (71)
2020–21	31 December 2020	Athletic Bilbao	Real Sociedad	0–1	—	Portu (5)
2020–21	7 April 2021	Real Sociedad	Athletic Bilbao	1–1	López (89)	Villalibre (85)
2021–22	31 October 2021	Real Sociedad	Athletic Bilbao	1–1	Isak (58 p.)	Muniain (90+1)
2021–22	20 February 2022	Athletic Bilbao	Real Sociedad	4–0	Vivian (68), Sancet (72), Williams (80), Muniain (89)	—
2022–23	14 January 2023	Real Sociedad	Athletic Bilbao	3–1	Sørloth (25), Kubo (37), Oyarzabal (62 p.)	Sancet (40)
2022–23	15 April 2023	Athletic Bilbao	Real Sociedad	2–0	Williams (33, 70)	—
2023–24	30 September 2023	Real Sociedad	Athletic Bilbao	3–0	Le Normand (30), Kubo (48), Oyarzabal (66)	—
2023–24	13 January 2024	Athletic Bilbao	Real Sociedad	2–1	Berenguer (30, 42)	Oyarzabal (88)
2024–25	24 November 2024	Athletic Bilbao	Real Sociedad	1–0	Sancet (26)	—
2024–25	4 May 2025	Real Sociedad	Athletic Bilbao	0–0	—	—
2025–26	1 November 2025	Real Sociedad	Athletic Bilbao	3–2	Méndez (38), Guedes (47), Gorrotxategi (90+2)	Guruzeta (42), Navarro (79)
2025–26	1 February 2026	Athletic Bilbao	Real Sociedad	1–1	Ruiz de Galarreta (88)	Guedes (37)
2026–27	1 November 2026	Athletic Bilbao	Real Sociedad	2–1	Williams (14), Berenguer (45+2 p.)	Sučić (30)
2026–27	2 May 2027	Real Sociedad	Athletic Bilbao			

=== Copa del Rey ===
Season	Date	Home team	Away team	Score	Home goal scorers	Away goal scorers
1909	04 April 1909 (QF)	Club Ciclista de San Sebastián	Athletic Bilbao	4–2 (Note: Club Ciclista (Real Sociedad) went on to win the trophy)	McGuinness (3 goals, 1 p.), Simmons (p.)	Saura (p.), Mortimer
1910	20 March 1910 (Group)	Vasconia SC	Athletic Bilbao	0–1 (Note: Athletic Bilbao went on to win the trophy)	—	Iza (56)
1923	22 April 1923 (SF L1)	Real Sociedad	Athletic Bilbao	0–0	—	—
1923	29 April 1923 (SF L2)	Athletic Bilbao	Real Sociedad	2–0 (Note: Athletic Bilbao went on to win the trophy)	Germán (18), Carmelo (44)	—
1930	20 April 1930 (R16 L1)	Athletic Bilbao	Real Sociedad	4–1	Chirri II (4), Gorostiza (32), Iraragorri (49), Unamuno (52)	Cholín (2)
1930	27 April 1930 (R16 L2)	Real Sociedad	Athletic Bilbao	1–1 (Note: Athletic Bilbao went on to win the trophy)	Marculeta (52)	Gorostiza (25)
1960–61	21 May 1961 (R16 L1)	Athletic Bilbao	Real Sociedad	3–1	Areta III (56, 75), Merodio (64)	Echarri (36)
1960–61	28 May 1961 (R16 L2)	Real Sociedad	Athletic Bilbao	1–2	Ribera 45'	Arieta I (24, 84)
1971–72	18 June 1972 (QF L1)	Real Sociedad	Athletic Bilbao	1–1	Urreisti 59'	Rojo I (90)
1971–72	24 June 1972 (QF L2)	Athletic Bilbao	Real Sociedad	2–0	Guisasola (22), Carlos (83)	—
1974–75	8 June 1975 (QF L1)	Real Sociedad	Athletic Bilbao	3–1	Murillo I (10, 57), Idígoras (17)	Amorrortu (23)
1974–75	15 June 1975 (QF L2)	Athletic Bilbao	Real Sociedad	3–1 (Note: After the second leg ended with a 4–4 aggregate score, a penalty shoot-out took place, which Athletic Bilbao won 6–5)	Villar (38), Carlos (50), Dani (72)	Gaztelu (39)
1981–82	3 February 1982 (QF L1)	Athletic Bilbao	Real Sociedad	1–0	Dani (29)	—
1981–82	17 February 1982 (QF L2)	Real Sociedad	Athletic Bilbao	3–2 (Note: After the second leg ended with a 3–3 aggregate score, a penalty shoot-out took place, which Real Sociedad won 4–2)	Kortabarria (6 p.), Uralde (62), Satrústegui (71)	Sarabia (58), Dani (p. 65)
1983–84	25 January 1984 (R16 L1)	Athletic Bilbao	Real Sociedad	0–0	—	—
1983–84	8 February 1984 (R16 L2)	Real Sociedad	Athletic Bilbao	1–1 (Note: After the second leg ended with a 1–1 aggregate score, a penalty shoot-out took place, which Athletic Bilbao won 5–3) (Note: Athletic Bilbao went on to win the trophy)	Celayeta (49)	Sarabia (60)
1984–85	17 April 1985 (QF L1)	Athletic Bilbao	Real Sociedad	2–0	Dani (25), J. Salinas (54)	—
1984–85	16 May 1985 (QF L2)	Real Sociedad	Athletic Bilbao	2–1	Uralde (88), Zamora (90)	Gallego (22)
1986–87	3 June 1987 (SF L1)	Real Sociedad	Athletic Bilbao	0–0	—	—
1986–87	10 June 1987 (SF L2)	Athletic Bilbao	Real Sociedad	0–1 (Note: Real Sociedad went on to win the trophy)	—	J. Bakero (25)
2019–20	3 April 2021 (Final) (Note: Took place at a neutral venue: La Cartuja in Seville)	Athletic Bilbao	Real Sociedad	0–1	—	Oyarzabal (63 p.)
2025–26	11 February 2026 (SF L1)	Athletic Bilbao	Real Sociedad	0–1	—	Turrientes (62)
2025–26	4 March 2026 (SF L2)	Real Sociedad	Athletic Bilbao	1–0	Oyarzabal (87 p.)	—

=== Copa de la Liga ===
Season	Date	Home team	Away team	Score	Home goal scorers	Away goal scorers
1986	1 May 1986 (R32 L1)	Real Sociedad	Athletic Bilbao	2–1	Mújika (52), Uralde (69)	Gallego (58)
1986	10 June 1987 (R32 L2)	Athletic Bilbao	Real Sociedad	2–2	De la Fuente (64), Sarriugarte (87)	Uralde (7), Mújica (48)

=== Champions tournament (1927) ===
Season	Date	Home team	Away team	Score
1927–28	12 October 1927	Athletic Bilbao	Real Sociedad	3–3
1927–28	29 January 1928	Real Sociedad	Athletic Bilbao	4–2

=== North championship (1914–18) ===
Season	Date	Home team	Away team	Score
1913–14	7 December 1913	Real Sociedad	Athletic Bilbao	1–1
1913–14	15 February 1914	Athletic Bilbao	Real Sociedad	3–2
1915–16	24 October 1915	Real Sociedad	Athletic Bilbao	2–0
1915–16	9 January 1916	Athletic Bilbao	Real Sociedad	4–0
1917–18	28 October 1917	Athletic Bilbao	Real Sociedad	1–0
1917–18	8 December 1917	Real Sociedad	Athletic Bilbao	0–0
1917–18	27 January 1918	Athletic Bilbao	Real Sociedad	2–0
1917–18	17 February 1918	Real Sociedad	Athletic Bilbao	2–2

=== Basque Cup (1934–36) ===
Season	Date	Home team	Away team	Score
1934–35	11 November 1934	Donostia	Athletic Bilbao	0–6
1934–35	25 November 1934	Athletic Bilbao	Donostia	4–0
1935–36	22 September 1935	Athletic Bilbao	Donostia	7–0
1935–36	27 October 1935	Donostia	Athletic Bilbao	0–2

== Comparative league placings ==
P.	29	30	31	32	33	34	35	36	40	41	42	43	44	45	46	47	48	49	50	51	52	53	54	55	56	57	58	59	60	61	62	63	64	65	66	67	68	69	70	71	72	73	74	75	76	77	78	79	80	81	82	83	84	85	86	87	88	89	90	91	92	93	94	95	96	97	98	99	00	01	02	03	04	05	06	07	08	09	10	11	12	13	14	15	16	17	18	19	20	21	22	23	24	25
1		1	1			1		1				1													1																									1	1	1	1																																									
2				2	2					2						2					2																		2										2								2										2					2																						
3	3		3						3						3									3				3	3																	3	3							3	3												3																											
4	4						4																			4																	4	4				4			4						4																									4	4									4		4
5						5														5											5				5					5			5		5														5		5		5										5												5					5			5	
6					6									6			6	6	6			6	6				6																										6													6														6						6			6		6		6	
7		7									7									7										7				7		7	7	7	7			7							7			7		7	7			7							7							7											7	7		7								
8				8															8						8					8			8							8	8				8	8																8		8		8		8											8									8			8	8		
9																							9				9														9	9						9		9																					9			9											9			9						
10													10								10	10						10				10												10												10												10													10									10				
11							11																															11									11											11					11	11					11								11												11					11
12																										12																																	12	12										12					12						12	12		12			12							
13													13				13																																							13				13		13							13	13	13							13																
14											14													14					14								14																								14													14																				
15																															15																																		15								15							15														
16																																																																											16												16							
17																																																																												17																		
18																																																																																														
19																																																																												19																		
20																																																																																														
21																																																																																														
22																																																																																														
D2								6	1	1		1		4	6	3		1														4	6	4	10	1																																									4	6	1															

• Total:Athletic Bilbao with 71 higher finishes, Real Sociedad with 23 higher finishes (as of the end of the 2024–25 season).

== Top goalscorers ==
Player	Club	La Liga	Copa	League Cup	Total
(Spain) Telmo Zarra	Athletic Bilbao	14	0	0	14
(Spain) Jesús María Satrústegui	Real Sociedad	13	1	0	14
(Spain) Dani	Athletic Bilbao	9	4	0	13
(Spain) Guillermo Gorostiza	Athletic Bilbao	8	2	0	10
(Spain) Pedro Uralde	Both	5	2	2	9
(Spain) Bata	Athletic Bilbao	9	0	0	9
(Ghana) Iñaki Williams	Athletic Bilbao	8	0	0	8
(Spain) José Luis Panizo	Athletic Bilbao	8	0	0	8
(Spain) José Artetxe	Athletic Bilbao	7	0	0	7
(Spain) Félix Marcaida	Athletic Bilbao	7	0	0	7
(Spain) Mikel Oyarzabal	Real Sociedad	6	1	0	7
(Turkey) Nihat Kahveci	Real Sociedad	7	0	0	7
(Spain) Rafael Iriondo	Athletic Bilbao	6	0	0	6
(Spain) Cholín	Real Sociedad	5	1	0	6
(Spain) José Iraragorri	Athletic Bilbao	5	1	0	6
(Spain) Iker Muniain	Athletic Bilbao	6	0	0	6

== Women's Basque derby ==
Athletic Bilbao established their women's team in 2002, with that of Real Sociedad founded two years later and reaching the top tier in 2006. While Athletic have won the national league title on five occasions, Real have yet to be champions, although they have never been relegated from the top division and in 2019 were winners of the Copa de la Reina, which Athletic had never been able to do.

In February 2019, a Basque derby league fixture hosted by Real Sociedad, which would usually be held at the club's Zubieta training centre, was played at the Anoeta Stadium, attracting an attendance of 21,234 (the result was a 2–2 draw). This attendance record was beaten in October 2019, at the same stadium, for a 2–0 Athletic away win watched by 28,367 spectators.

As of 15 February 2026

Competition (Note: The clubs have never met in UEFA or other international competitions)	GP	ATH	D	RSO	ATG	RSG
Primera División	44	26	10	8	91	33
Copa de la Reina	2	2	0	0	4	2
Basque Country Cup	12	8	1	3	24	13
Total	58	36	11	11	119	57

== See also ==
- Basque football derbies
