= 1956 Copa del Generalísimo final =

Copa del Generalísimo 1956 final
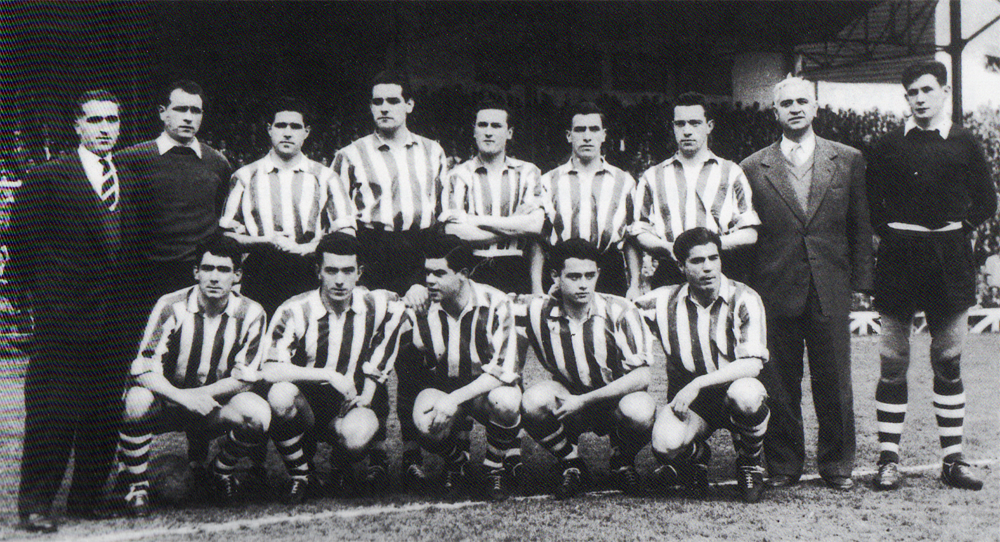
- Team of Athletic Bilbao, champions
- Event: 1956 Copa del Generalísimo
Atlético Bilbao	Atlético Madrid
2	1
- Date: 24 June 1956
- Venue: Estadio Chamartín, Madrid
- Referee: Julián Arqué
- Attendance: 125,000

The Copa del Generalísimo 1956 final was the 54th final of the King's Cup. The final was played at Estadio Chamartín in Madrid, on 24 June 1956, being won by Atlético de Bilbao, who beat Atlético de Madrid 2–1.

== Match details ==
24 June 1956
18:00 CET

Atlético Bilbao	2–1	Atlético Madrid
Arteche 37'; Maguregui 70'	Report	Molina 26'

Estadio Chamartín, Madrid
Attendance: 125,000
Referee: Julián Arqué

Atlético Bilbao

Atlético Madrid

GK	1	(Spain) Carmelo Cedrún
DF	2	(Spain) José Orúe
DF	3	(Spain) Jesús Garay
DF	4	(Spain) Canito
MF	5	(Spain) José María Maguregui
MF	6	(Spain) Mauri
FW	7	(Spain) Ignacio Uribe
FW	8	(Spain) Félix Marcaida
FW	9	(Spain) Eneko Arieta
FW	10	(Spain) José Artetxe
FW	11	(Spain) Agustín Gaínza (c)
Manager:
(Czechoslovakia) Ferdinand Daučík

GK	1	(Spain) Manuel Pazos
DF	2	(Spain) Cheché Martín
DF	3	(Paraguay) Heriberto Herrera
DF	4	(Spain) Verde
MF	5	(Spain) José Hernández
MF	6	(Spain) Ramón Cobo (c)
FW	7	(Spain) Miguel
FW	8	(Spain) Francisco Molina
FW	9	(Spain) Joaquín Peiró
FW	10	(Spain) Agustín
FW	11	(Spain) Enrique Collar
Manager:
(Spain) Antonio Barrios

== See also ==
Same finalists:

- 1921 Copa del Rey Final
- 1985 Copa del Rey Final
- 2012 UEFA Europa League Final
