= José Orúe =

Spanish footballer

Personal information
- Full name: José María Orúe Aranguren
- Date of birth: 17 March 1931
- Place of birth: Bilbao, Spain
- Date of death: 30 June 2007 (aged 76)
- Place of death: Bilbao, Spain
- Height: 1.71 m (5 ft 7 in)
- Position: Defender

Youth career
- Getxo

Senior career*
Years	Team	Apps	(Gls)
1950–1968	Athletic Bilbao	391	(1)
1951–1952	→ Barakaldo (loan)	30	(0)
Total		421	(1)

International career
1953–1957	Spain	3	(0)
1955	Spain B	1	(0)
- * Club domestic league appearances and goals

José María Orúe Aranguren (17 March 1931 – 30 June 2007) was a Spanish footballer who played as a right back.

He spent the vast majority of his professional career – which lasted 18 years – at Athletic Bilbao, appearing in 17 La Liga seasons and winning a total of four major trophies.

== Club career ==
Orúe was born in Zorroza, a neighbourhood in Bilbao, Biscay. After starting his career at CD Getxo, the 19-year-old signed with Basque club Athletic Bilbao, making his La Liga debut on 31 December 1950 in a 2–0 away loss against Atlético Madrid in what would be his only appearance of the season.

After a loan to Barakaldo CF in the same region, in the second division, Orúe returned to Athletic to be an instrumental part of the sides that won one league and three Copa del Rey trophies in the 50s, including the double in the 1955–56 campaign, with the player contributing with 35 official games (one goal, in a 3–2 home win against Deportivo Alavés on 1 January 1956, his only as a professional).

Part of the team that was dubbed "The 11 villagers"– which also included the likes of Canito, Carmelo Cedrún, Jesús Garay and José María Maguregui – Orúe left Bilbao after 1967–68 at the age of 37. He appeared in 391 league matches for his main club, fourth-most after José Ángel Iribar, Joseba Etxeberria and Txetxu Rojo (480 overall).

Orúe died on 30 June 2007 at the age of 76 in Bilbao, due to heart failure.

== International career ==
Orúe earned three caps for the Spain national team, over a three-and-a-half-year period. His debut came on 8 November 1953, playing the entire 2–2 friendly with Sweden in Bilbao.

Orúe's other two appearances arrived in 1957, against Holland (5–1 win, friendly) and Switzerland (2–2, in a 1958 FIFA World Cup qualifier).

== Honours ==
Athletic Bilbao

- La Liga: 1955–56
- Copa del Generalísimo: 1955, 1956, 1958
