= 1956–57 European Cup =

European football tournament

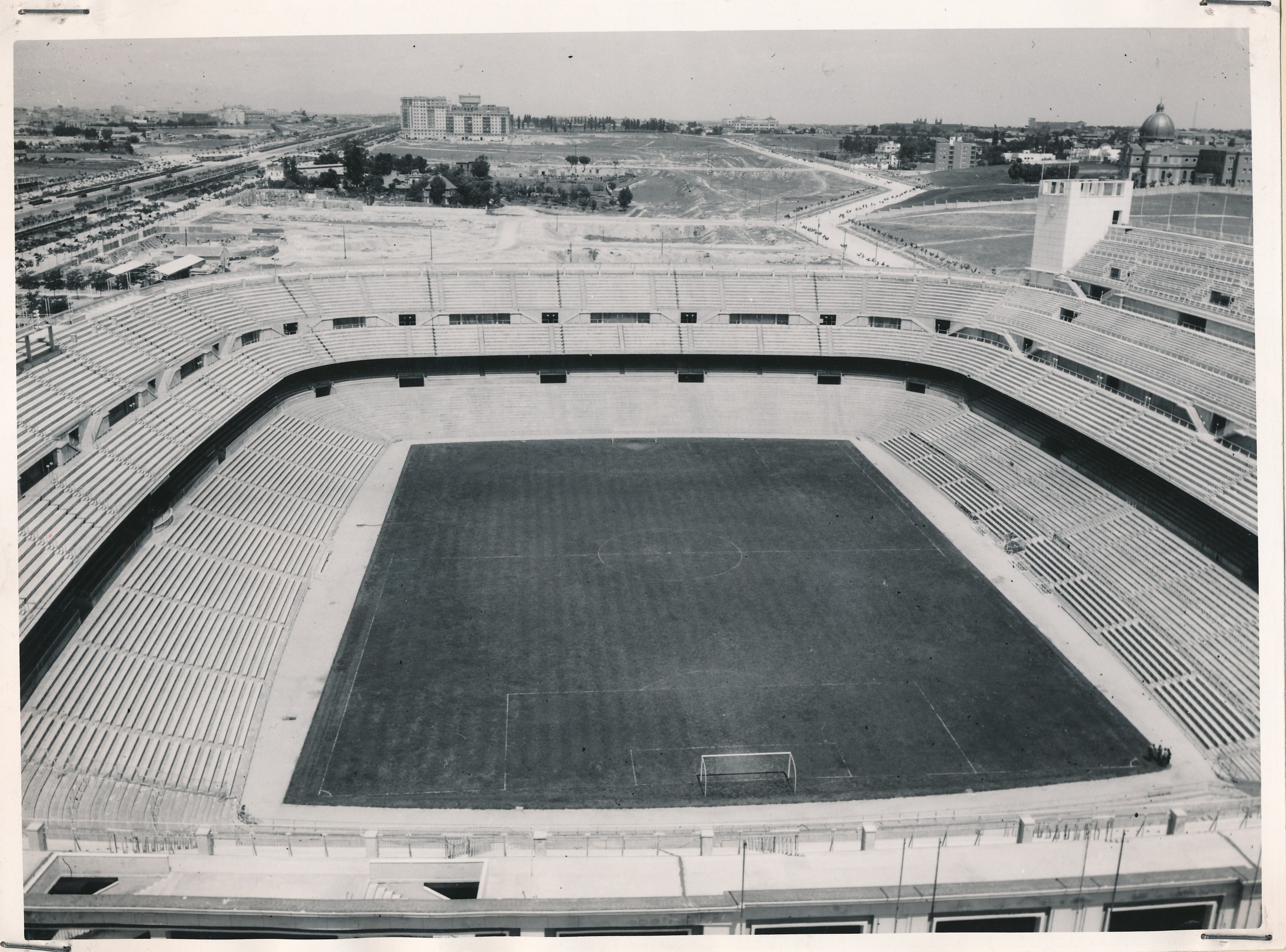
- The Santiago Bernabéu Stadium in Madrid hosted the final.

Tournament details
- Dates: 1 August 1956 – 30 May 1957
- Teams: 22 (from 21 associations)

Final positions
- Champions: (Spain) Real Madrid (2nd title)
- Runners-up: (Italy) Fiorentina

Tournament statistics
- Matches played: 44
- Goals scored: 170 (3.86 per match)
- Attendance: 1,840,978 (41,840 per match)
- Top scorer(s): Dennis Viollet (Manchester United); 9 goals

The 1956–57 European Cup was the second season of the European Cup, Europe's premier club football tournament. The competition was won for the second time by Real Madrid, who beat Fiorentina 2–0 in the final at the Santiago Bernabéu Stadium, Madrid, on 30 May 1957.

After the great success of the first tournament, six new nations entered representatives: Bulgaria, Czechoslovakia, England, Luxembourg, Romania and Turkey. The Football League had not allowed Chelsea to enter in 1955, and continued its stance on the European Cup as it being a "distraction". However, against the wishes of the FA, Manchester United entered the competition as English champions, becoming the first English team to play in Europe. An additional place was awarded to third in 1955–56 La Liga Real Madrid as the competition's reigning champions, occupying the free berth left by Saar after its reunification with West Germany. As a result, Spain became the first association to provide two representatives to the premier European competition and it was only for Manchester United, who had won against Athletic Bilbao in the quarter-finals, that first ever meeting between two sides from the same country in the competition didn't happen.

This edition was the first to utilize play-off matches, after two legs were not enough to decide which team advances to the next round on three occasions: Borussia Dortmund won 7–0 against Spora Luxembourg in the preliminary round, while Nice and Real Madrid won 3–1 and 2–1, respectively, against Rangers and Rapid Wien in the first round.

== Teams ==
A total of 22 teams participated in the competition.

AGF, Anderlecht, Rapid Wien and Real Madrid returned to the competition, after participating in the inaugural edition.

Galatasaray was the only team, other than the title holder, who didn't enter as a national association champion, as Süper Lig was not founded until 1959.

| (Austria) Rapid Wien (1st) | (Belgium) Anderlecht (1st) | (Bulgaria) CDNA Sofia (1st) | (Czechoslovakia) Slovan UNV Bratislava (1st) |
| (Denmark) AGF (1st) | (England) Manchester United (1st) | (France) Nice (1st) | (Hungary) Budapest Honvéd (1st) |
| (Italy) Fiorentina (1st) | Spora Luxembourg (1st) | (Netherlands) Rapid JC (1st) | (Poland) CWKS Warsaw (1st) |
| (Portugal) Porto (1st) | (Romania) Dinamo București (1st) | (Scotland) Rangers (1st) | (Spain) Athletic Bilbao (1st) |
| (Spain) Real Madrid (3rd)^{TH} | (Sweden) IFK Norrköping (1st) | (Switzerland) Grasshopper (1st) | (Turkey) Galatasaray (1st) (Note: There was no top-level Turkish champion in the period from 1952 to 1955.) |
| (West Germany) Borussia Dortmund (1st) | (Socialist Federal Republic of Yugoslavia) Red Star Belgrade (1st) | | |

== Preliminary round ==
Location of teams in the 1956–57 European Cup

The draw for the preliminary round took place in UEFA headquarters in Paris on 29 June 1956. The 21 challengers of Real Madrid were grouped geographically into three pots. The first four teams drawn in each pot would play the preliminary round in September, while the remaining three clubs received byes.

| | Pot 1 Eastern Europe | Pot 2 North-Western Europe | Pot 3 South-Central Europe |
|---|---|---|---|
| Drawn | (Czechoslovakia) Slovan UNV Bratislava | (France) Nice | (Portugal) Porto |
| Drawn | (Poland) CWKS Warsaw | (Denmark) AGF | (Spain) Athletic Bilbao |
| Drawn | (Turkey) Galatasaray | (Belgium) Anderlecht | (West Germany) Borussia Dortmund |
| Drawn | (Romania) Dinamo București | (England) Manchester United | Spora Luxembourg |
| Byes | (Hungary) Budapest Honvéd | (Scotland) Rangers | (Italy) Fiorentina |
| Byes | (Austria) Rapid Wien | (Sweden) IFK Norrköping | (Switzerland) Grasshopper |
| Byes | (Bulgaria) CDNA Sofia | (Netherlands) Rapid JC | (Socialist Federal Republic of Yugoslavia) Red Star Belgrade |

The calendar was decided by the involved teams, with all matches to be played by 1 October.

| Team 1 | Agg. | Team 2 | 1st leg | 2nd leg | Play-off |
|---|---|---|---|---|---|
| Borussia Dortmund (West Germany) | 5–5 | Spora Luxembourg | 4–3 | 1–2 | 7–0 |
| Dinamo București (Romania) | 4–3 | (Turkey) Galatasaray | 3–1 | 1–2 | |
| Slovan UNV Bratislava (Czechoslovakia) | 4–2 | (Poland) CWKS Warsaw | 4–0 | 0–2 | |
| Anderlecht (Belgium) | 0–12 | (England) Manchester United | 0–2 | 0–10 | |
| AGF (Denmark) | 2–6 | (France) Nice | 1–1 | 1–5 | |
| Porto (Portugal) | 3–5 | (Spain) Athletic Bilbao | 1–2 | 2–3 | |

=== First leg ===
1 August 1956
20:00 CET

| Borussia Dortmund (West Germany) | 4–3 | Spora Luxembourg |
|---|---|---|
| Bracht 31'; Niepieklo 54'; Preissler 61', 73' | Report | Boreux 25', 34', 88' |

Stadion Rote Erde, Dortmund
Attendance: 20,000
Referee: Johan Heinrich Martens (Netherlands)

26 August 1956
16:00 CET

| Dinamo București (Romania) | 3–1 | (Turkey) Galatasaray |
|---|---|---|
| Voica 10', 67'; Ene 84' | Report | Okay 77' |

Stadionul August 23, Bucharest
Attendance: 85,000
Referee: Francesco Liverani (Italy)

12 September 1956
19:30 CET

| Anderlecht (Belgium) | 0–2 | (England) Manchester United |
|---|---|---|
| | Report | Viollet 25'; Taylor 75' |

Stade Émile Versé, Anderlecht, Brussels
Attendance: 33,000
Referee: Leo Horn (Netherlands)

12 September 1956
20:00 CET

| Slovan UNV Bratislava (Czechoslovakia) | 4–0 | (Poland) CWKS Warsaw |
|---|---|---|
| Pažický 23', 68'; Kováč 30' (pen.); Moravčík 40' | Report |

Tehelné pole, Bratislava
Attendance: 25,000
Referee: Friedrich Mayer (Austria)

19 September 1956
20:00 CET

| AGF (Denmark) | 1–1 | (France) Nice |
|---|---|---|
| Jensen 16' | Report | Foix 61' |

Idrætsparken, Copenhagen
Attendance: 12,900
Referee: Arthur Edward Ellis (England)

20 September 1956
17:30 CET

| Porto (Portugal) | 1–2 | (Spain) Athletic Bilbao |
|---|---|---|
| Matos 54' | Report | Gaínza 8'; Canito 75' |

Estádio das Antas, Porto
Attendance: 35,000
Referee: Mario Maurelli (Italy)

=== Second leg ===
6 September 1956
20:00 CET

| Spora Luxembourg | 2–1 | (West Germany) Borussia Dortmund |
|---|---|---|
| Fiedler 22'; Letsch 39' | Report | Preissler 28' |

Stade Municipal, Luxembourg City
Attendance: 7,000
Referee: Karl Lescart (Belgium)

Borussia Dortmund 5–5 Spora Luxembourg on aggregate; play-off needed.

19 September 1956
20:00 CET

| CWKS Warsaw (Poland) | 2–0 | (Czechoslovakia) Slovan UNV Bratislava |
|---|---|---|
| Kowal 52'; Brychczy 63' | Report |

Stadion Wojska Polskiego, Warsaw
Attendance: 40,000
Referee: Alfred Grill (Austria)

Slovan UNV Bratislava won 4–2 on aggregate.

26 September 1956
17:00 CET

| Athletic Bilbao (Spain) | 3–2 | (Portugal) Porto |
|---|---|---|
| Artetxe 14', 73' (pen.), 82' | Report | Hernâni 4'; Jaburú 20' |

San Mamés, Bilbao
Attendance: 34,705
Referee: Mario Maurelli (Italy)

Athletic Bilbao won 5–3 on aggregate.

26 September 1956
20:30 CET

| Manchester United (England) | 10–0 | (Belgium) Anderlecht |
|---|---|---|
| Taylor 8', 20', 52'; Viollet 25', 38', 44', 65'; Whelan 61', 82'; Berry 77' | Report |

Maine Road, Manchester
Attendance: 43,635
Referee: Sandy Griffiths (Wales)

Manchester United won 12–0 on aggregate.

27 September 1956
20:00 CET

| Nice (France) | 5–1 | (Denmark) AGF |
|---|---|---|
| Foix 2'; Milazzo 27', 74'; Faivre 45', 60' | Report | Jensen 77' |

Stade du Ray, Nice
Attendance: 8,144
Referee: John Husband (England)

Nice won 6–2 on aggregate.

30 September 1956
14:15 CET

| Galatasaray (Turkey) | 2–1 | (Romania) Dinamo București |
|---|---|---|
| Aytaç 42'; Oktay 89' | Report | Suru 31' |

Mithatpaşa Stadyumu, Istanbul
Attendance: 23,764
Referee: Gustav Jiranek (Austria)

Dinamo București won 4–3 on aggregate.

=== Play-off ===
16 September 1956
20:00 CET

| Borussia Dortmund (West Germany) | 7–0 | Spora Luxembourg |
|---|---|---|
| Preissler 24', 36'; Simmer 29'; Kelbassa 40', 49', 63'; Peters 57' | Report |

Stadion Rote Erde, Dortmund
Attendance: 15,000
Referee: Fritz Buchmüller (Switzerland)

Borussia Dortmund won play-off 7–0.

== Bracket ==
First round
(Spain) Real Madrid | 4 | 1 | 5 (2)
(Austria) Rapid Wien | 2 | 3 | 5 (0)
(Scotland) Rangers | 2 | 1 | 3 (1)
(France) Nice | 1 | 2 | 3 (3)
(Spain) Athletic Bilbao | 3 | 3 | 6
(Hungary) Budapest Honvéd | 2 | 3 | 5
(England) Manchester United | 3 | 0 | 3
(West Germany) Borussia Dortmund | 2 | 0 | 2
(Netherlands) Rapid JC | 3 | 0 | 3
(Socialist Federal Republic of Yugoslavia) Red Star Belgrade | 4 | 2 | 6
(Bulgaria) CDNA Sofia | 8 | 2 | 10
(Romania) Dinamo București | 1 | 3 | 4
(Italy) Fiorentina | 1 | 1 | 2
(Sweden) IFK Norrköping | 1 | 0 | 1
(Czechoslovakia) Slovan UNV Bratislava | 1 | 0 | 1
(Switzerland) Grasshopper | 0 | 2 | 2

Quarter-finals
(Spain) Real Madrid | 3 | 3 | 6
(France) Nice | 0 | 2 | 2
(Spain) Athletic Bilbao | 5 | 0 | 5
(England) Manchester United | 3 | 3 | 6
(Socialist Federal Republic of Yugoslavia) Red Star Belgrade | 3 | 1 | 4
(Bulgaria) CDNA Sofia | 1 | 2 | 3
(Italy) Fiorentina | 3 | 2 | 5
(Switzerland) Grasshopper | 1 | 2 | 3

Semi-finals
(Spain) Real Madrid | 3 | 2 | 5
(England) Manchester United | 1 | 2 | 3
(Socialist Federal Republic of Yugoslavia) Red Star Belgrade | 0 | 0 | 0
(Italy) Fiorentina | 1 | 0 | 1

Final
(Spain) Real Madrid | 2
(Italy) Fiorentina | 0

== First round ==
| Team 1 | Agg. | Team 2 | 1st leg | 2nd leg | Play-off |
|---|---|---|---|---|---|
| Manchester United (England) | 3–2 | (West Germany) Borussia Dortmund | 3–2 | 0–0 | |
| CDNA Sofia (Bulgaria) | 10–4 | (Romania) Dinamo București | 8–1 | 2–3 | |
| Rangers (Scotland) | 3–3 | (France) Nice | 2–1 | 1–2 | 1–3 |
| Slovan UNV Bratislava (Czechoslovakia) | 1–2 | (Switzerland) Grasshopper | 1–0 | 0–2 | |
| Real Madrid (Spain) | 5–5 | (Austria) Rapid Wien | 4–2 | 1–3 | 2–0 |
| Rapid JC (Netherlands) | 3–6 | (Socialist Federal Republic of Yugoslavia) Red Star Belgrade | 3–4 | 0–2 | |
| Fiorentina (Italy) | 2–1 | (Sweden) IFK Norrköping | 1–1 | 1–0 | |
| Athletic Bilbao (Spain) | 6–5 | (Hungary) Budapest Honvéd | 3–2 | 3–3 | |

=== First leg ===
17 October 1956
19:00 CET

| CDNA Sofia (Bulgaria) | 8–1 | (Romania) Dinamo București |
|---|---|---|
| Kolev 12', 56', 63'; Milanov 20', 65'; Panayotov 27', 76'; Dimitrov 80' | Report | Băcuț 81' (pen.) |

Stadion Narodna Armia, Sofia
Attendance: 50,000
Referee: Vasa Stefanović (Yugoslavia)

17 October 1956
21:00 CET

| Manchester United (England) | 3–2 | (West Germany) Borussia Dortmund |
|---|---|---|
| Viollet 10', 25'; Pegg 35' | Report | Kapitulski 68'; Preissler 75' |

Maine Road, Manchester
Attendance: 75,568
Referee: Leo Horn (Netherlands)

24 October 1956
20:00 CET

| Slovan UNV Bratislava (Czechoslovakia) | 1–0 | (Switzerland) Grasshopper |
|---|---|---|
| Moravčík 20' | Report |

Tehelné pole, Bratislava
Attendance: 30,000
Referee: Fritz Seipelt (Austria)

24 October 1956
21:00 CET

| Rangers (Scotland) | 2–1 | (France) Nice |
|---|---|---|
| Murray 40'; Simpson 81' | Report | Faivre 23' |

Ibrox Park, Glasgow
Attendance: 65,000
Referee: Arthur Edward Ellis (England)

1 November 1956
16:00 CET

| Real Madrid (Spain) | 4–2 | (Austria) Rapid Wien |
|---|---|---|
| Di Stéfano 9', 21'; Marsal 60', 63' | Report | Dienst 58'; Giesser 90' |

Santiago Bernabéu, Madrid
Attendance: 100,000
Referee: Gottfried Dienst (Switzerland)

3 November 1956
15:00 CET

| Rapid JC (Netherlands) | 3–4 | (Socialist Federal Republic of Yugoslavia) Red Star Belgrade |
|---|---|---|
| Janssen 8'; Bisschops 78'; Tasić 81' (og.) | Report | Kostić 4', 75'; Toplak 42'; Rudinski 82' |

Kaalheide, Kerkrade
Attendance: 11,500
Referee: Albert Alsteen (Belgium)

21 November 1956
14:30 CET

| Fiorentina (Italy) | 1–1 | (Sweden) IFK Norrköping |
|---|---|---|
| Bizzarri 15' | Report | Bild 8' |

Comunale, Florence
Attendance: 6,000
Referee: Dean Harzic (France)

22 November 1956
15:30 CET

| Athletic Bilbao (Spain) | 3–2 | (Hungary) Budapest Honvéd |
|---|---|---|
| Artetxe 16'; Markaida 27'; Arieta 82' | Report | Budai II 75'; Kocsis 85' |

San Mamés, Bilbao
Attendance: 39,184
Referee: John Husband (England)

=== Second leg ===
8 November 1956
14:15 CET

| Red Star Belgrade (Socialist Federal Republic of Yugoslavia) | 2–0 | (Netherlands) Rapid JC |
|---|---|---|
| Toplak 32'; Kostić 84' | Report |

Stadion JNA, Belgrade
Attendance: 15,000
Referee: Rudolf Roman (Austria)

Red Star Belgrade won 6–3 on aggregate.

14 November 1956
19:30 CET

| Rapid Wien (Austria) | 3–1 | (Spain) Real Madrid |
|---|---|---|
| Happel 18', 38' (pen.), 40' | Report | Di Stéfano 60' |

Praterstadion, Vienna
Attendance: 60,000
Referee: Maurice Guigue (France)

Real Madrid 5–5 Rapid Wien on aggregate; play-off needed.

14 November 1956
20:00 CET

| Nice (France) | 2–1 | (Scotland) Rangers |
|---|---|---|
| Bravo 61'; Foix 64' | Report | Hubbard 40' (pen.) |

Stade du Ray, Nice
Attendance: 8,439
Referee: Riccardo Pieri (Italy)

Nice 3–3 Rangers on aggregate; play-off needed.

21 November 1956
20:00 CET

| Borussia Dortmund (West Germany) | 0–0 | (England) Manchester United |
|---|---|---|
| | Report |

Stadion Rote Erde, Dortmund
Attendance: 44,570
Referee: Johan Heinrich Martens (Netherlands)

Manchester United won 3–2 on aggregate.

28 November 1956
14:30 CET

| IFK Norrköping (Sweden) | 0–1 | (Italy) Fiorentina |
|---|---|---|
| | Report | Virgili 16' |

Stadio Olimpico, Rome
Attendance: 10,200
Referee: Michel Devillers (France)

Fiorentina won 2–1 on aggregate.

12 December 1956
20:00 CET

| Grasshopper (Switzerland) | 2–0 | (Czechoslovakia) Slovan UNV Bratislava |
|---|---|---|
| Vukosavljević 75'; Duret 89' | Report |

Grünwalder Stadion, Munich (Note: It is assumed this match was played in Munich as a result of Swiss protests regarding the outcome of the Hungarian Revolution of 1956 which also led to them boycotting the 1956 Olympic Games.)
Attendance: 12,000
Referee: Fritz Seipelt (Austria)

Grasshopper won 2–1 on aggregate.

20 December 1956
19:00 CET

| Budapest Honvéd (Hungary) | 3–3 | (Spain) Athletic Bilbao |
|---|---|---|
| Budai II 6'; Kocsis 78'; Puskás 86' | Report | Merodio 1', 72'; Arieta 67' |

Heysel Stadium, Brussels (Note: Played at Heysel Stadium, Brussels due to Hungarian Revolution of 1956.)
Attendance: 30,000
Referee: Albert Alsteen (Belgium)

Athletic Bilbao won 6–5 on aggregate.

30 December 1956
19:00 CET

| Dinamo București (Romania) | 3–2 | (Bulgaria) CDNA Sofia |
|---|---|---|
| Nicușor 58' (pen.); Lăzar 67'; Neagu 84' | Report | Stoyanov 23'; Yanev 62' |

Stadionul August 23, Bucharest
Attendance: 20,000
Referee: Gustav Jiranek (Austria)

CDNA Sofia won 10–4 on aggregate.

=== Play-off ===
28 November 1956
20:00 CET

| Nice (France) | 3–1 | (Scotland) Rangers |
|---|---|---|
| Foix 45'; Muro 50'; Faivre 75' | Report | Bonvin 51' (o.g.) |

Parc des Princes, Paris
Attendance: 11,908
Referee: Lucien Van Nuffel (Belgium)

Nice won play-off 3–1.

13 December 1956
15:30 CET

| Real Madrid (Spain) | 2–0 | (Austria) Rapid Wien |
|---|---|---|
| Joseíto 1'; Kopa 23' | Report |

Santiago Bernabéu, Madrid
Attendance: 100,000
Referee: Alfred Bond (England)

Real Madrid won play-off 2–0.

== Quarter-finals ==
| Team 1 | Agg. | Team 2 | 1st leg | 2nd leg |
|---|---|---|---|---|
| Athletic Bilbao (Spain) | 5–6 | (England) Manchester United | 5–3 | 0–3 |
| Fiorentina (Italy) | 5–3 | (Switzerland) Grasshopper | 3–1 | 2–2 |
| Real Madrid (Spain) | 6–2 | (France) Nice | 3–0 | 3–2 |
| Red Star Belgrade (Socialist Federal Republic of Yugoslavia) | 4–3 | (Bulgaria) CDNA Sofia | 3–1 | 1–2 |

=== First leg ===
16 January 1957
15:45 CET

| Athletic Bilbao (Spain) | 5–3 | (England) Manchester United |
|---|---|---|
| Uribe 2', 28'; Markaida 43'; Merodio 73'; Artetxe 78' | Report | Taylor 48'; Viollet 54'; Whelan 85' |

San Mamés, Bilbao
Attendance: 36,737
Referee: Albert Dusch (West Germany)

6 February 1957
15:00 CET

| Fiorentina (Italy) | 3–1 | (Switzerland) Grasshopper |
|---|---|---|
| Segato 3'; Taccola 10', 12' | Report | Ballaman 31' |

Comunale, Florence
Attendance: 10,000
Referee: Fritz Seipelt (Austria)

14 February 1957
16:15 CET

| Real Madrid (Spain) | 3–0 | (France) Nice |
|---|---|---|
| Joseíto 18'; Mateos 49', 72' | Report |

Santiago Bernabéu, Madrid
Attendance: 110,000
Referee: Gérard Versyp (Belgium)

17 February 1957
14:30 CET

| Red Star Belgrade (Socialist Federal Republic of Yugoslavia) | 3–1 | (Bulgaria) CDNA Sofia |
|---|---|---|
| Kostić 6', 25'; Popović 53' | Report | Yanev 88' |

Stadion Rajko Mitić, Belgrade
Attendance: 33,000
Referee: Riccardo Pieri (Italy)

=== Second leg ===
6 February 1957
21:30 CET

| Manchester United (England) | 3–0 | (Spain) Athletic Bilbao |
|---|---|---|
| Viollet 42'; Taylor 70'; Berry 85' | Report |

Maine Road, Manchester
Attendance: 70,000
Referee: Albert Dusch (West Germany)

Manchester United won 6–5 on aggregate.

24 February 1957
13:00 CET

| CDNA Sofia (Bulgaria) | 2–1 | (Socialist Federal Republic of Yugoslavia) Red Star Belgrade |
|---|---|---|
| Bozhkov 22' (pen.); Panayotov 39' | Report | Tasić 29' (pen.) |

Vasil Levski National Stadium, Sofia
Attendance: 50,000
Referee: Nikolai Latyshev (Soviet Union)

Red Star Belgrade won 4–3 on aggregate.

27 February 1957
20:00 CET

| Grasshopper (Switzerland) | 2–2 | (Italy) Fiorentina |
|---|---|---|
| Ballaman 25'; Vukosavljević 85' | Report | Julinho 7'; Montuori 52' |

Stadion Hardturm, Zürich
Attendance: 18,000
Referee: Fritz Seipelt (Austria)

Fiorentina won 5–3 on aggregate.

14 March 1957
15:00 CET

| Nice (France) | 2–3 | (Spain) Real Madrid |
|---|---|---|
| Foix 15'; Ferry 82' (pen.) | Report | Joseíto 45'; Di Stéfano 50', 79' |

Stade du Ray, Nice
Attendance: 21,724
Referee: John Husband (England)

Real Madrid won 6–2 on aggregate.

== Semi-finals ==
| Team 1 | Agg. | Team 2 | 1st leg | 2nd leg |
|---|---|---|---|---|
| Red Star Belgrade (Socialist Federal Republic of Yugoslavia) | 0–1 | (Italy) Fiorentina | 0–1 | 0–0 |
| Real Madrid (Spain) | 5–3 | (England) Manchester United | 3–1 | 2–2 |

=== First leg ===
3 April 1957
15:45 CET

| Red Star Belgrade (Socialist Federal Republic of Yugoslavia) | 0–1 | (Italy) Fiorentina |
|---|---|---|
| | Report | Prini 88' |

Stadion JNA, Belgrade
Attendance: 40,000
Referee: Albert Alsteen (Belgium)

11 April 1957
16:30 CET

| Real Madrid (Spain) | 3–1 | (England) Manchester United |
|---|---|---|
| Rial 61'; Di Stéfano 73'; Mateos 83' | Report | Taylor 82' |

Santiago Bernabéu, Madrid
Attendance: 120,000
Referee: Leo Horn (Netherlands)

=== Second leg ===
18 April 1957
16:15 CET

| Fiorentina (Italy) | 0–0 | (Socialist Federal Republic of Yugoslavia) Red Star Belgrade |
|---|---|---|
| | Report |

Comunale, Florence
Attendance: 70,000
Referee: Klaas Schipper (Netherlands)

Fiorentina won 1–0 on aggregate.

25 April 1957
20:15 CET

| Manchester United (England) | 2–2 | (Spain) Real Madrid |
|---|---|---|
| Taylor 52'; Charlton 85' | Report | Kopa 25'; Rial 33' |

Old Trafford, Manchester
Attendance: 65,000
Referee: Marcel Lequesne (France)

Real Madrid won 5–3 on aggregate.

== Final ==
30 May 1957
17:30 CET

| Real Madrid (Spain) | 2–0 | (Italy) Fiorentina |
|---|---|---|
| Di Stéfano 69' (pen.); Gento 75' | Report |

Santiago Bernabéu, Madrid
Attendance: 124,000
Referee: Leo Horn (Netherlands)

== Top goalscorers ==
The top scorers from the 1956–57 European Cup (including preliminary round) were as follows:

| Rank | Player | Team | Goals |
|---|---|---|---|
| 1 | (England) Dennis Viollet | (England) Manchester United | 9 |
| 2 | (England) Tommy Taylor | (England) Manchester United | 8 |
| 3 | (Spain) Alfredo Di Stéfano | (Spain) Real Madrid | 7 |
| 4 | (West Germany) Alfred Preissler | (West Germany) Borussia Dortmund | 6 |
| 5 | (Spain) José Luis Artetxe | (Spain) Athletic Bilbao | 5 |
| 5 | (France) Jacques Foix | (France) Nice | 5 |
| 5 | (Socialist Federal Republic of Yugoslavia) Bora Kostić | (Socialist Federal Republic of Yugoslavia) Red Star Belgrade | 5 |
| 8 | (France) Jacques Faivre | (France) Nice | 4 |
| 9 | (Luxembourg) Marc Boreux | Spora Luxembourg | 3 |
| 9 | (Austria) Ernst Happel | (Austria) Rapid Wien | 3 |
| 9 | (Spain) Joseíto | (Spain) Real Madrid | 3 |
| 9 | (West Germany) Alfred Kelbassa | (West Germany) Borussia Dortmund | 3 |
| 9 | (Spain) Enrique Mateos | (Spain) Real Madrid | 3 |
| 9 | (Spain) Armando Merodio | (Spain) Athletic Bilbao | 3 |
| 9 | (Bulgaria) Panayot Panayotov | (Bulgaria) CDNA Sofia | 3 |
| 9 | (Bulgaria) Ivan Kolev | (Bulgaria) CDNA Sofia | 3 |
| 9 | (Republic of Ireland) Billy Whelan | (England) Manchester United | 3 |
