= Armando Merodio =

Spanish footballer (1935–2018)

Personal information
- Full name: Armando Merodio Pesquera
- Date of birth: 23 August 1935
- Place of birth: Barcelona, Spain
- Date of death: 21 June 2018 (aged 82)
- Place of death: Bilbao, Spain
- Height: 1.80 m (5 ft 11 in)
- Position: Striker

Youth career
- Gallarta
- Getxo
- Amurrio

Senior career*
| Years | Team | Apps | (Gls) |
| 1954–1956 | Barakaldo | 22 | (4) |
| 1956–1963 | Athletic Bilbao | 88 | (35) |
| 1963–1965 | Murcia | 55 | (13) |
| 1965–1966 | Recreativo | 9 | (2) |
| 1966–1967 | Indautxu | 15 | (3) |
| Total | | 189 | (57) |

International career
| 1953 | Spain U18 | 4 | (1) |
- * Club domestic league appearances and goals

Armando Merodio Pesquera (23 August 1935 – 21 June 2018) was a Spanish footballer who played as a striker.

== Football career ==
Born in Barcelona, Catalonia, where his father (known as 'Txikito Gallarta') was a pelota player, Merodio's family moved back to the Basque Country when he was three years old. He started his professional career with Barakaldo CF but soon signed with Athletic Bilbao, being eligible to represent the club due to learning his football skills in the territory.

Merodio made his La Liga debut on 11 March 1956, scoring in a 2–1 home win against Atlético Madrid. His input during the season, however, was restricted to a further two games as the team won the league and also the Copa del Rey; on 16 January 1957, in the subsequent edition of the European Cup, he found the net in a 5–3 defeat of Manchester United in the quarter-finals' first leg, losing 5–6 on aggregate.

During the 1958–59 campaign, Merodio scored 11 times over four consecutive league games (Athletic won 9–0, 9–0, 8–1 and 7–0). He eventually left the club in 1963 with 104 official appearances and 39 goals, joining Real Murcia also in the top division, playing there for two seasons and suffering relegation in his second.

Merodio closed out his career in 1967 at nearly 32, after one-year spells in the second level with Recreativo de Huelva and SD Indautxu, the latter also in the Basque region. He died on 21 June 2018 in Bilbao, aged 82.

== Honours ==
Athletic Bilbao (Note: He played only the last few league matches in the title season and did not take part in either Cup final, but was credited as a winner of the trophies by the club.)

- La Liga: 1955–56
- Copa del Generalísimo: 1956, 1958
