= Mauri (Spanish footballer) =

Spanish footballer (1934–2022)

Personal information
- Full name: Mauricio Ugartemendia Lauzirika
- Date of birth: 26 July 1934
- Place of birth: Gernika, Spain
- Date of death: 18 February 2022 (aged 87)
- Place of death: Gernika, Spain
- Position: Midfielder

Youth career
- Gernika

Senior career*
Years	Team	Apps	(Gls)
1952–1953	Getxo		
1953–1964	Athletic Bilbao	246	(60)
1964–1966	Recreativo	3	(0)
1966	Sabadell	10	(3)
1966–1967	Avilés		
Total		259	(63)

International career
1955	Spain B	1	(0)
1955–1956	Spain	5	(0)
- * Club domestic league appearances and goals

Mauricio Ugartemendia Lauzirika (26 July 1934 – 18 February 2022), commonly known as Mauri, was a Spanish footballer who played as a midfielder.

== Club career ==
Born in Gernika, Basque Country, Mauri spent 11 seasons in La Liga with Athletic Bilbao. He made his debut in the competition on 20 September 1953, in a 2–3 home loss against Real Madrid.

Mauri appeared in 293 official matches during his spell at the San Mamés Stadium, scoring 72 goals. In the top flight he also represented CE Sabadell FC, during the second part of the 1965–66 campaign.

== International career ==
Mauri won five caps for Spain in one year. His first came on 18 May 1955, in a 1–1 friendly draw with England in Madrid.

== Death ==
On 18 February 2022, Mauri died at the age of 87.

== Honours ==
Athletic Bilbao

- La Liga: 1955–56
- Copa del Generalísimo: 1955, 1956, 1958
