= José Luis Artetxe =

Spanish footballer (1930–2016)

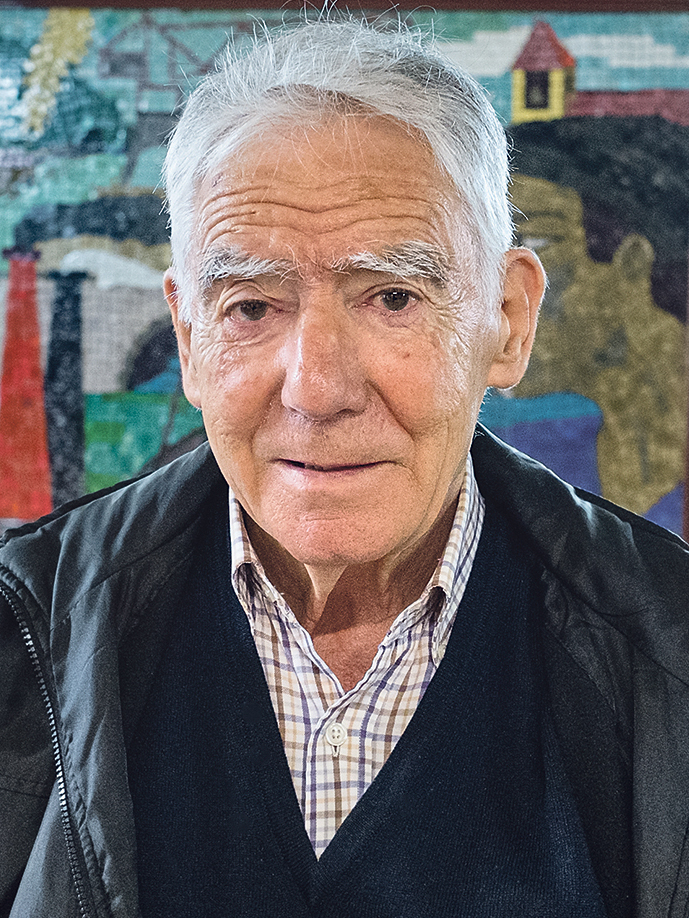
- Artetxe in 2015

Personal information
- Full name: José Luis Artetxe Muguire
- Date of birth: 28 June 1930
- Place of birth: Algorta, Spain
- Date of death: 19 March 2016 (aged 85)
- Place of death: Algorta, Spain
- Height: 1.74 m (5 ft 9 in)
- Position: Striker

Youth career
- 1947–1949: Mungia

Senior career*
Years	Team	Apps	(Gls)
1949–1950	Getxo		
1950–1965	Athletic Bilbao	274	(105)

International career
1953	Spain B	1	(0)
1954–1959	Spain	6	(1)
- * Club domestic league appearances and goals

José Luis Artetxe Muguire (28 June 1930 – 19 March 2016) was a Spanish footballer who played as a striker.

== Club career ==
Born in Algorta, Biscay, Artetxe joined Athletic Bilbao in 1950 from neighbouring CD Getxo. He went on to spend the remainder of his 16-year career with the former, making his La Liga debut on 10 September in a 4–0 home win against Atlético Madrid.

In the 1955–56 season, Artetxe contributed 24 games and 15 goals to help the team to win the sixth league championship in their history. During his spell at the San Mamés Stadium he appeared in 346 competitive matches and scored 133 goals, also claiming three Copa del Generalísimo trophies (scoring in the 1956 edition, a 2–1 victory over Atlético Madrid); several years after his retirement at the age or 35, he still ranked amongst his main club's all-time scorers.

== International career ==
Artetxe earned six caps for Spain in five years. His debut came on 17 March 1954 in a 2–2 draw against Turkey for the 1954 FIFA World Cup qualifiers, where he scored the game's first goal in Rome; it was already the third match between the two countries, and the opposition would eventually reach the finals in Switzerland after a drawing of lots.

== Personal life and death ==
Artetxe died in his hometown on 19 March 2016, aged 85. His son, also named José Luis, worked for sports newspaper Diario AS.

== Honours ==
Athletic Bilbao

- La Liga: 1955–56
- Copa del Generalísimo: 1955, 1956, 1958
- Copa Eva Duarte: 1950
