= José María Maguregui =

Spanish footballer and coach

Personal information
- Full name: José María Maguregui Ibarguchi
- Date of birth: 16 March 1934
- Place of birth: Miraballes, Spain
- Date of death: 30 December 2013 (aged 79)
- Place of death: Bilbao, Spain
- Height: 1.72 m (5 ft 8 in)
- Position: Midfielder

Youth career
- Villosa
- 1951–1952: Athletic Bilbao

Senior career*
Years	Team	Apps	(Gls)
1952–1961	Athletic Bilbao	198	(36)
1952	→ Getxo (loan)		
1961–1963	Sevilla	19	(0)
1963–1964	Español	14	(3)
1964–1965	Recreativo	8	(3)
Total		239	(42)

International career
1952	Spain U18	2	(0)
1955	Spain B	1	(1)
1955–1957	Spain	7	(1)

Managerial career
- 1967–1969: Miravalles
- 1969–1972: Sestao
- 1972–1977: Racing Santander
- 1977–1978: Celta
- 1978–1980: Almería
- 1980–1983: Español
- 1983–1987: Racing Santander
- 1987–1988: Celta
- 1988: Atlético Madrid
- 1988–1989: Murcia
- 1990–1991: Celta
- 1992–1993: Poli Almería
- * Club domestic league appearances and goals

José María Maguregui Ibarguchi (16 March 1934 – 30 December 2013) was a Spanish football midfielder and coach.

== Playing career ==
Born in Ugao-Miraballes, Biscay, Maguregui made his professional debuts in 1952 at the age of 18, with Basque Country giants Athletic Bilbao. After a poor first season in La Liga – 12 games, no goals – he became a very important first-team unit, helping them to the 1956 national championship and three Copa del Rey trophies in four years.

In 1963, after amassing official totals of and 235 matches and 42 goals, 29-year-old Maguregui left Athletic, retiring after spells with Sevilla FC (two years), RCD Español and Recreativo de Huelva. He earned seven caps for Spain in slightly less than two years, scoring in his debut on 19 June 1955, a 3–0 friendly win in Switzerland.

=== International goals ===
#	Date	Venue	Opponent	Score	Result	Competition
1.	19 June 1955	Charmilles, Geneva, Switzerland	Switzerland	0–3	0–3	Friendly

== Coaching career ==
After managing his hometown club in amateur football, Maguregui moved to Sestao Sport also in his native region. In 1972 he was appointed at Racing de Santander, achieving two top flight promotions with the Cantabrians and remaining five years with the team.

Maguregui then managed to lead two more teams to division one promotions, RC Celta de Vigo in 1978 and lowly AD Almería in 1979, overachieving with the latter in the following season (ninth-place finish), which prompted his signing with a club he had represented as a player, Español.

After three average seasons in Catalonia, ranking between positions 9–13, Maguregui returned to Racing, helping it to top flight promotion in his first year and going on to remain with the club a total of nine years, being the manager with more games at its service. He worked with Celta in the 1987–88 season, also in the first division, being dismissed in round 30 due to the surmounting pressure after his agreement with Atlético Madrid for the following campaign.

Maguregui was fired by Atlético in early October 1988 in spite of two consecutive home wins, 3–0 against Cádiz CF for the league and 2–1 over FC Groningen in the UEFA Cup (away goals rule elimination), being one of four coaches used by the club during the season (elusive Jesús Gil was the chairman) which saw the team finish in fourth place. He concluded the campaign with fellow league club Real Murcia, which suffered relegation.

Maguregui's last job at the professional level was with Celta, with the coach arriving in Galicia late into 1989–90 – which ended in top flight relegation – and leaving 18 games into the following season.

== Death ==
Maguregui died on 30 December 2013 at the age of 79 in Bilbao, after a long battle with illness. In his last public appearance, in June, he attended the inauguration of the new San Mamés.

== Honours ==
=== Player ===
Athletic Bilbao

- La Liga: 1955–56
- Copa del Generalísimo: 1955, 1956, 1958

Spain U18

- UEFA European Under-18 Championship: 1952

=== Manager ===
Almería

- Segunda División: 1978–79
