= Ángel Paz (Spanish footballer) =

Spanish footballer (1932–2025)

Personal information
- Full name: Ángel Paz Domínguez
- Date of birth: 1 April 1932
- Place of birth: Pasaia, Spain
- Date of death: 14 December 2025 (aged 93)
- Place of death: San Sebastián, Spain
- Height: 1.74 m (5 ft 9 in)
- Position: Forward

Youth career
- Pasajes

Senior career*
Years	Team	Apps	(Gls)
1951–1961	Real Sociedad	227	(55)
1961–1963	Real Murcia	48	(4)
Total		275	(59)
- * Club domestic league appearances and goals

Ángel Paz Domínguez (1 April 1932 – 14 December 2025) was a Spanish footballer who played as a forward. He spent most of his career with Real Sociedad in La Liga, playing 269 games across all competitions and scoring 68 goals. He later played for Real Murcia in the Segunda División.

== Career ==
Born in Pasaia in Gipuzkoa, Paz joined Real Sociedad from local team Pasajes, and made his professional debut on 4 March 1951 in a 7–1 loss away to Athletic Bilbao in the Basque Derby. His last appearance on 28 May 1961 was against the same team, in a 2–1 loss at Atotxa Stadium.

Paz had a rivalry with Athletic Bilbao's Eneko Arieta, and was once forced by the club president to shake hands with Arieta in front of the crowd at Atotxa. Paz was part of a Real Sociedad team that did not have the resources of Real Madrid and Barcelona, but remained a La Liga regular through determination; Paz received particular attention for his man-marking of one of Real Madrid's imports, Alfredo Di Stéfano.

In 1956, Real Murcia wanted to sign Paz, but club president José María Gastaminza refused to sell. This decision led to the resignation of Real Sociedad's directors, and eventually Gastaminza himself, while Paz played on. The transfer was not completed until 1961, for a 600,000 Spanish peseta fee and 300,000 in annual salary for the player; Real Sociedad ended the season with relegation. In 1962–63, Real Murcia achieved promotion as champions of the Segunda División southern sector.

== Personal life and death ==
Paz and his wife, Conchita Larrea, had four children. He died in San Sebastián on 14 December 2025, at the age of 93.
