= Luis María Uribe =

Spanish footballer (1906–1994)

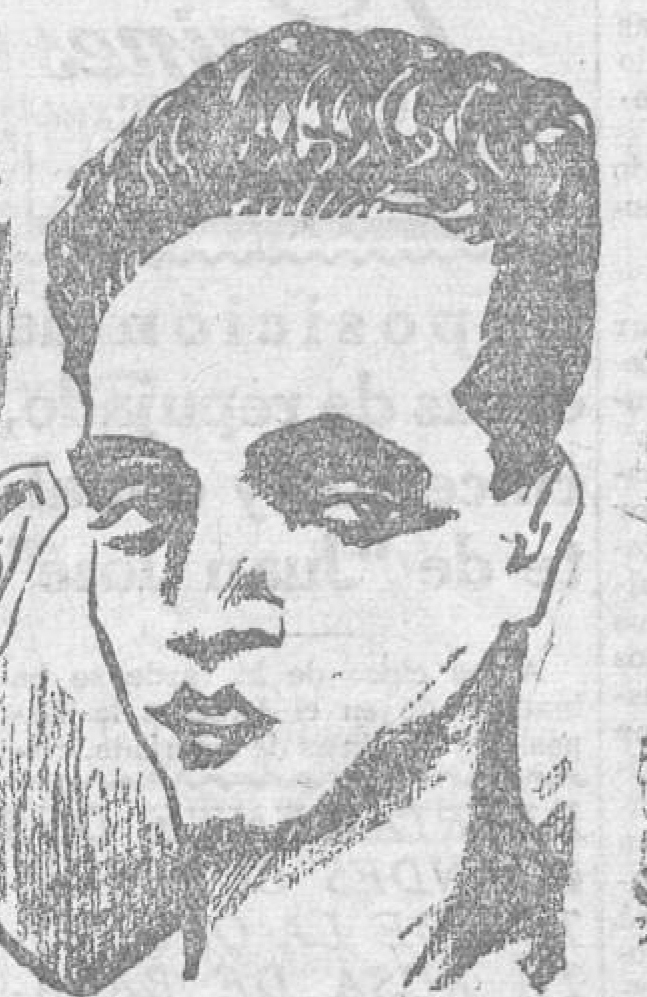
- Luis María Uribe

Personal information
- Full name: Luis María de Uribe Echevarría
- Date of birth: 21 August 1890
- Place of birth: Urduliz, Spain
- Date of death: 24 January 1966 (aged 75)
- Position: Forward

Senior career*
Years	Team	Apps	(Gls)
1924–1926	Sociedad Gimnástica		
1926–1929	Real Madrid	1	(0)
1929–1934	Athletic Bilbao	23	(14)
- * Club domestic league appearances and goals

Luis María de Uribe Echevarría (17 October 1906 – 18 November 1994), nicknamed Volea, was a Spanish footballer who played as a forward for Real Madrid and Athletic Bilbao. He was a member of the great Bilbao side under Fred Pentland that won two league titles and three Copa del Rey titles in the early 1930s.

He is the father of former Athletic Bilbao footballer Ignacio Uribe.

== Playing career ==
=== Real Madrid ===
Uribe was born on 17 October 1906 in Urduliz, Biscay. When he finished high school he moved to Madrid in 1924, at the age of 18, to study medicine, settling in a boarding house. Whilst in the capital, he joined the ranks of Sociedad Gimnástica before being signed by Real Madrid. He was a pure amateur and coincided with the arrival of the first professional that Madrid had: José María Peña. In the quarterfinals of the 1927 Copa del Rey, he scored three goals in a 8–1 victory tie break match over CE Europa, but the team eventually lost in the semifinals to Real Unión.

In total, he scored 60 goals in just 57 competitive matches, including 24 goals in 26 cup matches between 1926 and 1929. He left Madrid in 1929, the same year in which the national first division was founded, with Uribe playing only one such match with the white team, on 16 June 1929 in a 2–0 victory against Arenas Club de Getxo.

=== Athletic Bilbao ===
Once he finished his studies in 1929, Uribe returned to the Basque Country, where he joined the ranks of Fred Pentland's Athletic Bilbao. He was a member of the squad that won two league titles and three Copa del Rey titles between 1930 and 1934 under Pentland; however, he did not play a major role in these triumphs due to the presence of other talented forwards considered among the best in the club's history (Lafuente, José Iraragorri, Chirri II, Bata and Guillermo Gorostiza). In his first year, for example, he only played two matches in the regional championship, without participating in the league or the cup. Despite not being a prominent regular, he got to start (as a midfielder) in the 1932 final, helping his side to a 1–0 victory over FC Barcelona.

According to his son, Uribe "was a bit of the team's wild card when one of the starters was missing", and when given the opportunity he often demonstrated his qualities and his shooting power. For instance, on 14 December 1930, he made his La Liga debut with the Bilbao team, scoring twice in the Basque derby against Real Sociedad to help his side to a 6–1 win. In total, he scored 26 goals in just 43 games, including a hat-trick in his last League game, on 12 November 1933, against Real Betis.

== Honours ==
Real Madrid

- Campeonato Regional Centro: 1927, 1929

Athletic Club

- La Liga: 1930–31, 1933–34
- Copa del Rey: 1931, 1932, 1933
- Biscay Championship: 1931, 1932, 1933, 1934
