= Beitia (footballer) =

Spanish footballer (1936–2026)

Gonzalo Díaz Beitia
Personal information
- Date of birth: 17 November 1936
- Place of birth: Sestao, Spain
- Date of death: 1 August 2026 (aged 89)
- Height: 1.73 m (5 ft 8 in)
- Position: Forward

Senior career*
Years	Team	Apps	(Gls)
1955–1957	Barakaldo	46	(8)
1957–1960	Athletic Bilbao	33	(7)
1958–1959	→ Ceuta	15	(3)
1960–1961	Barcelona	6	(0)
1961–1963	Tenerife	46	(11)
1963–1964	Atlético Madrid	8	(1)
1964–1966	Constància	39	(11)
1966–1967	Salamanca	5	(0)
Total		198	(41)
- * Club domestic league appearances and goals

Gonzalo Díaz Beitia (17 November 1936 – 1 August 2026) was a Spanish footballer who played as a forward.

In a career that spanned from 1955 to 1967, he won the Copa del Generalísimo in 1958 with Bilbao.

Díaz died on 1 August 2026, at the age of 89.
