= Gaztelu (footballer) =

Spanish footballer (1946–2020)

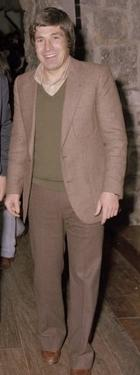
- Gaztelu in 1981

Personal information
- Full name: José Agustín Aranzábal Askasibar
- Date of birth: 23 July 1946
- Place of birth: Bergara, Spain
- Date of death: 30 December 2020 (aged 74)
- Place of death: Bergara, Spain
- Height: 1.69 m (5 ft 7 in)
- Position: Midfielder

Youth career
- 1963–1965: Vergara

Senior career*
Years	Team	Apps	(Gls)
1965–1966	San Sebastián	27	(5)
1966–1981	Real Sociedad	257	(28)
Total		284	(33)

International career
1970	Spain U23	1	(0)
1969–1971	Spain	2	(0)
- * Club domestic league appearances and goals

José Agustín Aranzábal Askasibar (23 July 1946 – 30 December 2020), known as Gaztelu, was a Spanish professional footballer who played as a midfielder.

He spent his entire career with Real Sociedad, playing 308 competitive games and scoring 33 goals.

== Club career ==
Gaztelu was born in Bergara, Gipuzkoa. As a young child, he received his nickname, meaning "castle" in Basque, after a farm owned by his aunt. He signed with Real Sociedad in 1965 from his local club and, after just one season with the reserves, was promoted to the first team at the age of 20.

Gaztelu made his debut in La Liga on 8 October 1967, playing the full 90 minutes in a 0–0 away draw against Sevilla FC. He scored his first goal in the competition on 17 November of the following year, in another draw (1–1, at Deportivo de La Coruña). In early 1970, whilst playing with the Spain under-23 team in Italy, he suffered a serious injury that sidelined him for nearly two years.

Gaztelu scored a career-best seven goals (from 29 games) in 1973–74, helping the Txuriurdin to the fourth position. On 5 December 1976, he was decorated by Real Sociedad to celebrate his tenth season and, shortly after, scored twice – once through a penalty kick – to help to a 5–0 home win over Athletic Bilbao in the Basque derby.

Gaztelu contributed one match in 1980–81, as Real won their first ever national championship. In the process, he became the first player to achieve that feat as well as promotion from Segunda División in 1967, retiring at the end of the campaign at 35.

== International career ==
Gaztelu won two caps for Spain in as many years. His first came on 15 October 1969, as he started in a 6–0 rout of Finland in La Línea de la Concepción for the 1970 FIFA World Cup qualifiers.

== Personal life and death ==
Gaztelu's son Agustín was also a footballer. A defender, he too played for Real Sociedad and Spain.

The former died in his hometown on 30 December 2020, aged 74.

== Honours ==
- La Liga: 1980–81
- Segunda División: 1966–67

== See also ==
- List of one-club men
