= Ignacio Uribe =

Spanish footballer

Personal information
- Full name: Ignacio Uribe Etxebarria
- Date of birth: 27 December 1933 (age 92)
- Place of birth: Bilbao, Spain
- Position: Forward

Senior career*
Years	Team	Apps	(Gls)
1951–1953	Indautxu		
1953–1963	Athletic Bilbao	173	(59)

International career
1955–1957	Spain B	3	(0)
- * Club domestic league appearances and goals

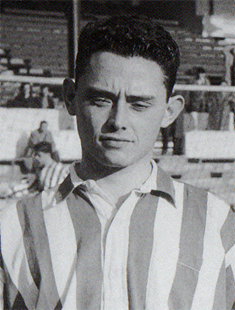

Ignacio Uribe Etxebarria (born 27 December 1933) is a Spanish former footballer who played as a forward.

== Club career ==
Born in Bilbao, and the son of former Real Madrid and Athletic Bilbao player Luis María de Uribe (1906–1994), Uribe joined the latter in 1953, from Basque neighbours SD Indautxu. He made his La Liga debut on 20 September of that year, in 2–3 home loss against Real Madrid.

In the 1955–56 season, Uribe contributed with 30 games and nine goals to help the club win the sixth league championship in its history. During his ten-year stint at the San Mamés Stadium, he amassed overall totals of 211 matches and 69 goals, also conquering three Copa del Generalísimo trophies (scoring the only goal in the 1955 edition, against Sevilla CF); he retired at the age of 29.

== Honours ==
- La Liga: 1955–56
- Copa del Generalísimo: 1955, 1956, 1958
