= Eneko Arieta =

Spanish footballer

Personal information
- Full name: Eneko Arieta-Araunabeña Piedra
- Date of birth: 21 August 1933
- Place of birth: Durango, Spain
- Date of death: 27 December 2004 (aged 71)
- Place of death: Galdakao, Spain
- Height: 1.75 m (5 ft 9 in)
- Position: Forward

Youth career
- Maristas
- Jesuitas
- Tavira
- Getxo

Senior career*
Years	Team	Apps	(Gls)
1951–1966	Athletic Bilbao	248	(136)

International career
1954	Spain B	1	(0)
1955	Spain	3	(2)
- * Club domestic league appearances and goals

Eneko Arieta-Araunabeña Piedra (21 August 1933 – 27 December 2004), known as Arieta, was a Spanish footballer who played as a forward.

== Club career ==
Born in Durango, Biscay, Arieta joined Athletic Bilbao in 1951 from neighbouring CD Getxo. Barred by the likes of Agustín Gaínza, Rafael Iriondo, José Luis Panizo, Venancio and Telmo Zarra, he appeared in only two La Liga games in his first two seasons, but scored in his debut on 9 September 1951, a 4–2 home win against Sporting de Gijón.

After the arrival of new coach Ferdinand Daučík before the start of 1954–55, several veterans began being gradually replaced, and Arieta succeeded Zarra as the team top scorer, netting 20 times in 28 matches during the campaign and also winning the Copa del Generalísimo against Sevilla FC. He added 13 goals the following season as his team claimed the sixth national championship in their history.

On 29 June 1958, Arieta opened the scoring in the Spanish Cup final, helping defeat hosts Real Madrid 2–0 and winning the second of his third trophies in the tournament. He retired in 1966 at the age of 32, having made 302 total appearances with 170 goals, and died in Galdakao at 71 due to illness.

== International career ==
Arieta won three caps for Spain, all in 1955 friendlies. His debut came on 17 March in a 2–1 defeat to France in Madrid, and he scored in the following two appearances, in Switzerland (3–0) and against England (4–1 loss at Wembley Stadium).

== Personal life ==
Arieta's younger brother, Antón, was also a footballer and a forward. He also played for Athletic, and as the pair shared teams for two years they were known as Arieta I and Arieta II.

== Honours ==
Athletic Bilbao

- La Liga: 1955–56
- Copa del Generalísimo: 1955, 1956, 1958

== See also ==
- List of one-club men
