= Canito (footballer, born 1931) =

Spanish footballer

Personal information
- Full name: Nicanor Sagarduy Gonzalo
- Date of birth: 18 March 1931
- Place of birth: Barakaldo, Spain
- Date of death: 24 June 1998 (aged 67)
- Place of death: Barakaldo, Spain
- Height: 1.70 m (5 ft 7 in)
- Position: Defender

Youth career
- El Carmen

Senior career*
Years	Team	Apps	(Gls)
1947–1948	Barakaldo	25	(9)
1948–1963	Athletic Bilbao	354	(4)
1963–1964	Alavés	1	(0)
Total		380	(13)

International career
1955	Spain B	3	(0)
1957	Spain	1	(0)
- * Club domestic league appearances and goals

Nicanor Sagarduy Gonzalo (previously Nicanor Trapero Gonzalo), known as Canito (18 March 1931 – 24 June 1998), was a Spanish footballer who played as a defender.

== Club career ==
Canito signed with Basque Country club Athletic Bilbao in 1948, from neighbours Barakaldo CF in the Segunda División. Immediately after arriving, on 12 September, the 17-year-old made his La Liga debut, helping to a 7–2 home demolition of Real Valladolid. He scored his first goal for the Lions in his tenth appearance, in the 4–0 win against Sevilla FC also at the San Mamés Stadium.

In the 1955–56 season, Canito appeared in 27 games as Athletic won the top-division title. He would also be an essential defensive player as they claimed three Copa del Generalísimo trophies in just four years (for a total of four during his spell).

After 15 years in the senior squad, and 440 competitive matches to his credit, Canito moved to another side in the region, Deportivo Alavés, but retired a few months later. He died aged 67 in his hometown of Barakaldo, Biscay.

== International career ==
Canito won his only cap for Spain on 10 March 1957, as he featured the full 90 minutes of a 2–2 draw in Madrid against Switzerland for the 1958 FIFA World Cup qualification stage. Neither team would make it to the finals, both trailing group winners Scotland.

== Honours ==
Athletic Bilbao

- La Liga: 1955–56
- Copa del Generalísimo: 1949–50, 1955, 1956, 1958
- Copa Eva Duarte: 1950
