= Jean-Pierre Fiedler =

Luxembourgish footballer

Personal information
- Date of birth: 26 January 1935
- Place of birth: Luxembourg
- Date of death: 25 November 1977 (aged 42)
- Position: Forward

Senior career*
Years	Team	Apps	(Gls)
- Spora Luxembourg

International career
1953	Luxembourg U18	1	(0)
1957–1963	Luxembourg	12	(3)
- * Club domestic league appearances and goals

Jean-Pierre Fiedler (26 January 1935 – 25 November 1977) was a Luxembourgish footballer who played as a forward for Spora Luxembourg and the Luxembourg national football team.

== Club career ==
Fiedler spent his entire career at Spora Luxembourg, playing three times in the 1956–57 European Cup against Borussia Dortmund, scoring in the second leg on 6 September 1956, forcing the tie to go to a play-off, which Borussia Dortmund won 7–0.

== International career ==
On 22 March 1953, Fiedler made his only appearance for Luxembourg U18 against Switzerland. Fiedler made 12 appearances for Luxembourg, scoring three times. On 11 September 1957, Fiedler scored on his debut for Luxembourg in a 5–2 away defeat against the Netherlands.
