= Santiago Idígoras =

Spanish footballer

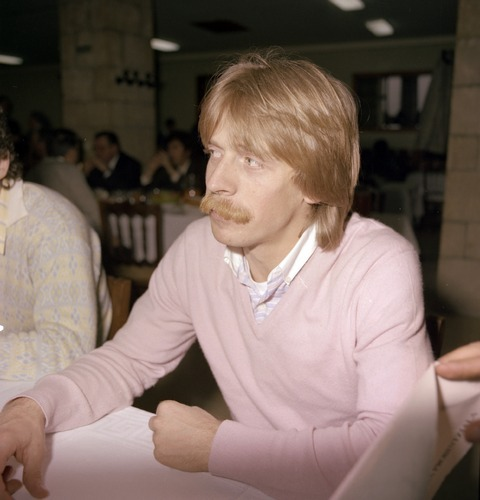
- Idígoras in 1981

Personal information
- Full name: Santiago Idígoras Bilbao
- Date of birth: 24 June 1953 (age 73)
- Place of birth: Oñati, Spain
- Height: 1.83 m (6 ft 0 in)
- Position: Forward

Youth career
- Real Sociedad

Senior career*
Years	Team	Apps	(Gls)
1972–1974	San Sebastián		
1974–1981	Real Sociedad	204	(39)
1981–1982	Puebla	34	(12)
1982–1983	Valencia	16	(4)
1983–1985	Alavés	51	(11)

International career
1975–1976	Spain amateur	6	(1)
1977	Spain U21	2	(0)
1977	Spain	1	(0)
- * Club domestic league appearances and goals

Santiago Idígoras Bilbao (born 24 July 1953) is a Spanish retired professional footballer who played as a forward or left winger.

== Club career ==
Born in Oñati, Gipuzkoa, Idígoras was a product of local Real Sociedad's youth system. After two seasons with the reserves he was promoted to the first team for the 1974–75 campaign, making his La Liga debut on 15 September 1974 in a 0–1 away loss against Celta de Vigo on 15 September 1974, and finishing his first year with 25 games and four goals as the Txuriurdin finished in fourth position.

Idígoras was a very important first-team member for the Basques during his seven-year spell, never appearing in less than 25 league matches and helping them to the 1981 national championship, with the player contributing with 29 games – 21 starts – and three goals; due to his physical appearance (pale white and blond), he was given the nickname El Vikingo de Oñati (Viking from Oñati).

Idígoras left Real Sociedad after that conquest, having appeared in a total of 255 official games for the club (47 goals), and signed for Puebla F.C. in Mexico. He was offered a hefty contract as the club was trying to build up a championship-caliber team that year, and joined compatriots Juan Manuel Asensi (ex-FC Barcelona) and Pirri (Real Madrid), but La Franja eventually did not qualify for the playoff rounds.

In the 1982 summer, after one sole season abroad, Idígoras returned to Spain and joined Valencia CF, teaming up with Mario Kempes. He struggled during the season, losing his starting position midway through the campaign, with the Che also finishing in 15th position.

Idígoras closed his career in 1985 at the age of 32 after two years with Deportivo Alavés in the third division, helping the side to two consecutive third-place finishes, albeit without playoff promotion.

== International career ==
Idígoras earned one cap for Spain, playing 45 minutes in a 1–0 win against Republic of Ireland on 9 February 1977, in a friendly in Dublin. He also represented the country at the 1976 Summer Olympics in Montreal, with the tournament ending in group stage elimination.

== Post-retirement ==
After retiring, Idígoras ran a gym in San Sebastián, in his native region.

== Honours ==
Real Sociedad

- La Liga: 1980–81
