= Agustín Aranzábal =

Spanish footballer (born 1973)

Personal information
- Full name: Agustín Aranzábal Alkorta
- Date of birth: 15 March 1973 (age 53)
- Place of birth: Bergara, Spain
- Height: 1.86 m (6 ft 1 in)
- Position: Left-back

Youth career
- 1984–1987: Bergara
- 1987–1991: Real Sociedad

Senior career*
| Years | Team | Apps | (Gls) |
| 1991–1994 | Real Sociedad B | 90 | (14) |
| 1993–2004 | Real Sociedad | 322 | (5) |
| 2004–2007 | Zaragoza | 31 | (0) |
| 2007–2008 | Vera | 0 | (0) |
| 2010 | Kitchee | 0 | (0) |
| Total | | 443 | (19) |

International career
| 1994–1996 | Spain U21 | 9 | (0) |
| 1996 | Spain U23 | 4 | (0) |
| 1995–2003 | Spain | 28 | (0) |
| 1995–2003 | Basque Country | 8 | (0) |
Medal record
Men's football
Representing Spain
UEFA European Under-21 Championship
| Runner-up | 1996 Spain |
- * Club domestic league appearances and goals

Agustín Aranzábal Alkorta (Spanish pronunciation: [aɣusˈtin aɾanˈθaβal alˈkoɾta]; born 15 March 1973) is a Spanish former professional footballer who played as a left-back.

His main asset was his crossing ability, and he played almost exclusively with Real Sociedad, which he represented for more than ten years, appearing in 353 competitive matches.

Aranzábal was also a Spanish international, and played for the country in one World Cup and one European Championship.

== Club career ==
Aranzábal was born in Bergara, Gipuzkoa. A product of Basque Country giants Real Sociedad's youth system, he first appeared with the main squad on 21 February 1993, in a 5–1 away loss against Deportivo de La Coruña. After three full seasons with the reserves, he went on to be an undisputed first-choice for one decade, for instance playing 32 games for the 2002–03 runners-up.

In July 2004, still in La Liga, Aranzábal moved to Real Zaragoza, where he was used mainly as a backup to Paraguayan Delio Toledo. He retired after a small stint with amateur side Vera in the Canary Islands, with ex-Spain international (also a Real Sociedad teammate) Javier de Pedro also starting the campaign but being promptly dismissed.

In early 2010, Kitchee from Hong Kong signed Aranzábal alongside compatriot Albert Celades. They both appeared with the club at the 2010 Lunar New Year Cup, a mid-season exhibition tournament.

== International career ==
Aranzábal earned 28 caps for Spain. His debut was on 7 June 1995 in a UEFA Euro 1996 qualifier against Armenia in Seville, and he was a participant at the 1998 FIFA World Cup and Euro 2000.

Aranzábal also appeared for the quarter-finalists at the 1996 Summer Olympics.

== Personal life ==
Aranzábal's father, José Agustín, was also a footballer. A midfielder, he too played for Real Sociedad and Spain.

== Honours ==
Spain U21

- UEFA European Under-21 Championship runner-up: 1996
