= Antón Arieta =

Spanish footballer (1946–2022)

Personal information
- Full name: Antón Arieta-Araunabeña Piedra
- Date of birth: 6 January 1946
- Place of birth: Durango, Spain
- Date of death: 7 May 2022 (aged 76)
- Place of death: Durango, Spain
- Height: 1.74 m (5 ft 9 in)
- Position: Striker

Youth career
- 1960–1964: Athletic Bilbao

Senior career*
Years	Team	Apps	(Gls)
1964–1974	Athletic Bilbao	261	(61)
1974–1976	Hércules	44	(7)
Total		305	(68)

International career
1964	Spain B	1	(1)
1970–1972	Spain	7	(4)
- * Club domestic league appearances and goals

Antón Arieta-Araunabeña Piedra (6 January 1946 – 7 May 2022), known as Arieta, was a Spanish footballer who played as a striker.

== Club career ==
Born in Durango, Biscay, Arieta played youth football with local Athletic Bilbao. At the age of 18, he was immediately promoted from Lezama into the first team, scoring a career-best 12 goals in the 1964–65 season to help his team to the seventh position in La Liga.

During his ten-year stint at the San Mamés Stadium, Arieta appeared in 358 games in all competitions, netting 83 times. He won two Copa del Rey trophies with his main club, scoring in the 1972–73 edition, won 2–0 against CD Castellón.

In summer 1974, Arieta signed with Hércules CF also of the top division. After only one goal in 12 matches in his second year, he retired at the age of 30.

== International career ==
Arieta earned seven caps for Spain in two years. His debut came on 11 February 1970, and he scored two of his four goals for his country in a 2–0 friendly win over West Germany in Seville.

== Personal life ==
Arieta's older brother, Eneko, was also a footballer and a forward. He too played for Athletic, and as the pair shared teams for two years they were known as Arieta I and Arieta II.

Arieta died on 7 May 2022, aged 76.

== Honours ==
Athletic Bilbao

- Copa del Generalísimo: 1969, 1972–73
