= Jacques Foix =

French footballer (1930–2017)

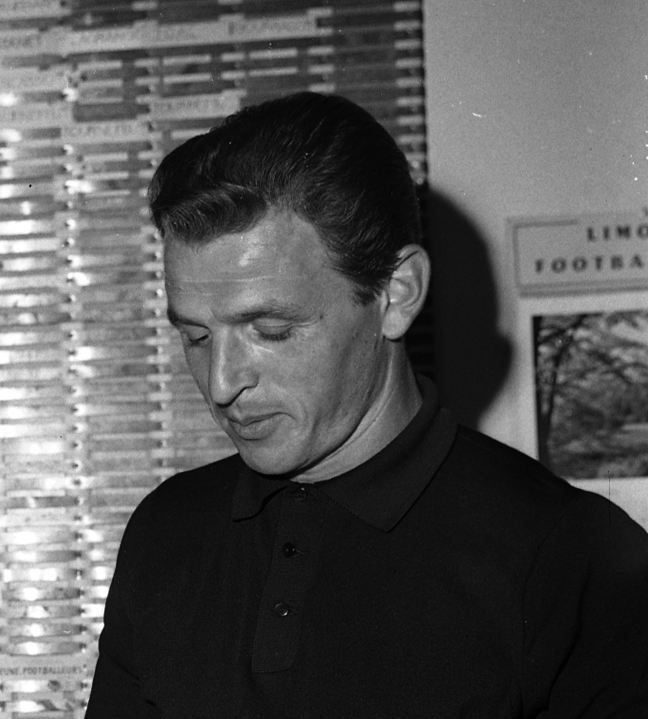

Personal information
- Full name: Jacques Foix
- Date of birth: 26 November 1930
- Place of birth: Mont-de-Marsan, France
- Date of death: 14 June 2017 (aged 86)
- Position: Striker

Senior career*
Years	Team	Apps	(Gls)
1951–1953	RC Paris	52	(24)
1953–1956	AS Saint-Étienne	97	(47)
1956–1961	OGC Nice	162	(49)
1961–1962	Toulouse FC	18	(4)
1962–1964	AS Saint-Étienne	52	(13)

International career
1953–1956	France	7	(3)
- * Club domestic league appearances and goals

Jacques Foix (French pronunciation: [ʒak fwa]; 26 November 1930 – 14 June 2017) was a French footballer who played striker. His playing career spanned from 1951 to 1964. Foix made seven appearances for the France national team between 1953 and 1956, scoring three goals and was a member of two French League championship squads in 1959 and 1964.

Foix died 14 June 2017 at age 86.
