= Javier de Pedro =

Spanish footballer (born 1973)

Javi de Pedro
Personal information
- Full name: Francisco Javier de Pedro Falque
- Date of birth: 4 August 1973 (age 53)
- Place of birth: Logroño, Spain
- Height: 1.80 m (5 ft 11 in)
- Position: Midfielder

Youth career
- 1982–1989: Antiguoko
- 1989–1992: Real Sociedad

Senior career*
| Years | Team | Apps | (Gls) |
| 1992–1994 | Real Sociedad B | 48 | (12) |
| 1993–2004 | Real Sociedad | 304 | (45) |
| 2004 | Blackburn Rovers | 2 | (0) |
| 2005 | Perugia | 5 | (0) |
| 2005–2006 | IFK Göteborg | 0 | (0) |
| 2006 | Ergotelis | 0 | (0) |
| 2006–2007 | Burgos | 5 | (0) |
| 2007 | Vera | 0 | (0) |
| Total | | 364 | (57) |

International career
| 1991 | Spain U18 | 3 | (0) |
| 1994–1996 | Spain U21 | 4 | (0) |
| 1998–2003 | Spain | 12 | (2) |
| 1995–2001 | Basque Country | 7 | (2) |
Medal record
Men's football
Representing Spain
UEFA European Under-21 Championship
| Runner-up | 1996 Spain |
- * Club domestic league appearances and goals

Francisco Javier "Javi" de Pedro Falque (born 4 August 1973) is a Spanish retired footballer.

He played as a left midfielder, mainly with Real Sociedad, and possessed a thunderous left-foot shot. He also played professionally in four other countries.

De Pedro represented Spain at the 2002 World Cup.

== Club career ==
De Pedro was born in Logroño, La Rioja. A product of Real Sociedad's youth system, he first appeared with the main squad on 7 November 1993, coming on as a substitute in a 1–3 home defeat against UE Lleida. Subsequently, he became an essential element with the La Liga side, creating opportunities and scoring alike: in the 2002–03 season he contributed with 29 games and three goals as the Basques finished in second position, trailing eventual champions Real Madrid by only two points; in the subsequent edition of the UEFA Champions League, he scored a late consolation goal after coming on as a substitute in a 2–4 defeat away to Juventus FC.

De Pedro joined Blackburn Rovers in mid-June 2004, after he had been refused a move to Southampton the previous year, playing out the remaining season of his contract undeterred. He made his debut for his new team on 14 August in a 1–1 Premier League home draw against West Bromwich Albion, before being replaced by Tugay Kerimoğlu for the second half of the match.

On 31 January 2005, in the last day of the campaign's winter transfer window, de Pedro was released by Blackburn on a free transfer and signed for Perugia Calcio, where he played only a few matches before joining Swedish club IFK Göteborg, thanks to the presence of former Real Sociedad teammate Håkan Mild, now their director of football; he left after only a few days for personal reasons, in December.

Afterwards, de Pedro would only play some exhibition matches with Ergotelis F.C. from the Football League (Greece). He subsequently returned to Spain to sign with Burgos CF, but appeared very rarely for the Segunda División B team.

De Pedro started 2007–08, alongside former Real Sociedad and Spain teammate Agustín Aranzábal, with regional club CD Vera in the Canary Islands, but was dismissed by the team's coach due to a lack of commitment. He retired from football after this experience, and subsequently focused on getting a coaching qualification.

== International career ==
Having made his debut with Spain on 23 September 1998 in a friendly match against Russia in Granada, de Pedro appeared at the 2002 FIFA World Cup, where he played in all the matches as a starter. His last cap came in 2003.

De Pedro also played for the Basque Country regional team, scoring against Nigeria and Morocco.

=== International goals ===
| # | Date | Venue | Opponent | Score | Result | Competition |
|---|---|---|---|---|---|---|
| 1. | 18 November 1998 | Arechi, Salerno, Italy | Italy | 1–1 | 2–2 | Friendly |
| 2. | 30 April 2003 | Vicente Calderón, Madrid, Spain | Ecuador | 1–0 | 4–0 | Friendly |

== Personal life ==
In November 2009, de Pedro was arrested for driving under the influence and with an expired driver's licence. In January 2018, he was arrested for domestic violence.

== Honours ==
Spain U21

- UEFA European Under-21 Championship: Runner-up 1996
