= 1955 Copa del Generalísimo =

53rd Copa del Rey

Tournament details
- Country: Spain
- Teams: 14

Final positions
- Champions: Atlético de Bilbao (18th title)
- Runners-up: Sevilla CF

Tournament statistics
- Matches played: 29
- Goals scored: 109 (3.76 per match)

The 1955 Copa del Generalísimo was the 53rd staging of the Spanish Cup. The competition began on 17 April 1955 and concluded on 5 June 1955 with the final.

== Round of 16 ==
Team 1	Agg.	Team 2	1st leg	2nd leg
Club Atlético de Bilbao	2–1	Real Murcia CF	0–1	2–0
Sevilla CF	5–3	Cultural y Deportiva Leonesa	3–0	2–3
Valencia CF	5–5	UD Las Palmas	5–2	0–3
Hércules CF	5–4	RC Celta de Vigo	3–0	2–4
RC Deportivo de La Coruña	2–2	CD Alavés	2–0	0–2
Club Atlético de Madrid	3–3	Real Valladolid Deportivo	3–2	0–1

Source: RSSSF

- Tiebreaker

Team 1	Score	Team 2
Valencia CF	4–1	UD Las Palmas
RC Deportivo de La Coruña	2–0	CD Alavés
Club Atlético de Madrid	1–1	Real Valladolid Deportivo
Club Atlético de Madrid	1–2	Real Valladolid Deportivo

- Bye: Real Madrid CF and CF Barcelona.

== Quarter-finals ==
Team 1	Agg.	Team 2	1st leg	2nd leg
Real Madrid CF	5–2	Real Valladolid Deportivo	1–1	4–1
CF Barcelona	8–1	RC Deportivo de La Coruña	7–0	1–1
Club Atlético de Bilbao	10–4	Hércules CF	5–1	5–3
Sevilla CF	6–5	Valencia CF	5–1	1–4

Source: RSSSF

== Semi-finals ==
Team 1	Agg.	Team 2	1st leg	2nd leg
CF Barcelona	2–4	Club Atlético de Bilbao	0–2	2–2
Real Madrid CF	1–8	Sevilla CF	1–3	0–5

Source: RSSSF

== Final ==
Team 1	Score	Team 2
Atlético de Bilbao	1–0	Sevilla CF

Copa del Generalísimo
winners
Atlético de Bilbao
18th title
