= 1956 Copa del Generalísimo =

54th Copa del Rey

Tournament details
- Country: Spain
- Teams: 16

Final positions
- Champions: Club Atlético de Bilbao (19th title)
- Runners-up: Atlético de Madrid

Tournament statistics
- Matches played: 30
- Goals scored: 118 (3.93 per match)

The 1956 Copa del Generalísimo was the 54th staging of the Spanish Cup. The competition began on 6 May 1956 and concluded on 24 June 1956 with the final.

== Round of 16 ==
Team 1	Agg.	Team 2	1st leg	2nd leg
RC Deportivo de La Coruña	3–6	CA Osasuna	1–2	2–4
Club Atlético de Bilbao	6–2	Cultural y Deportiva Leonesa	3–0	3–2
Real Valladolid Deportivo	7–2	RC Celta de Vigo	6–0	1–2
Real Madrid CF	7–1	Real Sociedad de Fútbol	5–0	2–1
Hércules CF	2–3	CF Barcelona	1–2	1–1
RCD Español	3–2	Sevilla CF	3–2	0–0
Real Jaén CF	2–1	Valencia CF	1–0	1–1
UD Las Palmas	1–10	Club Atlético de Madrid	1–4	0–6∅

Source: RSSSF

== Quarter-finals ==
Team 1	Agg.	Team 2	1st leg	2nd leg
Club Atlético de Bilbao	6–3	CA Osasuna	4–1	2–2
RCD Español	7–5	CF Barcelona	3–1	4–4
Real Jaén CF	2–7	Club Atlético de Madrid	2–2	0–5
Real Madrid CF	8–3	Real Valladolid Deportivo	4–1	4–2∅

Source: RSSSF

== Semi-finals ==
Team 1	Agg.	Team 2	1st leg	2nd leg
Real Madrid CF	4–5	Club Atlético de Bilbao	2–2	2–3
RCD Español	2–2	Club Atlético de Madrid	1–2	1–0

Source: RSSSF

- Tiebreaker

Team 1	Score	Team 2
RCD Español	0–3	Club Atlético de Madrid

== Final ==
Team 1	Score	Team 2
Club Atlético de Bilbao	2–1	Club Atlético de Madrid

Copa del Generalísimo
winners
Club Atlético de Bilbao
19th title
