= 1955–56 La Liga =

25th season of La Liga

Primera División
- Season: 1955–56
- Champions: Athletic Bilbao (6th title)
- Relegated: Murcia; Alavés; Cultural Leonesa; Hércules
- European Cup: Athletic Bilbao; Real Madrid (as holders)
- Latin Cup: Athletic Bilbao
- Matches: 240
- Goals: 908 (3.78 per match)
- Top goalscorer: Alfredo Di Stéfano (24 goals)
- Biggest home win: Atlético Madrid 9–0 Hércules
- Biggest away win: Deportivo La Coruña 0–7 Barcelona
- Highest scoring: Real Madrid 8–3 Celta
- Longest winning run: 10 matches Barcelona
- Longest unbeaten run: 13 matches Atlético Bilbao
- Longest winless run: 10 matches Hércules; Las Palmas; Murcia
- Longest losing run: 6 matches Cultural Leonesa

The 1955–56 La Liga was the 25th season since its establishment. Athletic Bilbao achieved their sixth title.

== Team locations ==
Location of teams in 1955–56 La Liga
Location of teams in 1955–56 La Liga (Canary Islands)

Team	Home city	Stadium
Alavés	Vitoria	Mendizorroza
Atlético Bilbao	Bilbao	San Mamés
Atlético Madrid	Madrid	Metropolitano
Barcelona	Barcelona	Las Corts
Celta	Vigo	Balaidos
Cultural Leonesa	León	La Puentecilla
Deportivo La Coruña	A Coruña	Riazor
Español	Barcelona	Sarriá
Hércules	Alicante	La Viña
Las Palmas	Las Palmas	Insular
Murcia	Murcia	La Condomina
Real Madrid	Madrid	Santiago Bernabéu
Real Sociedad	San Sebastián	Atocha
Sevilla	Seville	Nervión
Valencia	Valencia	Mestalla
Valladolid	Valladolid	Municipal

== League table ==
Pos	Team	Pld	W	D	L	GF	GA	GD	Pts	Qualification or relegation
1	Atlético Bilbao (C)	30	22	4	4	79	31	+48	48	Qualification for the European Cup and for the Latin Cup
2	Barcelona	30	22	3	5	67	26	+41	47	
3	Real Madrid	30	18	2	10	81	39	+42	38	Qualification for the European Cup (Note: Real Madrid qualified for the European Cup as title holders.)
4	Sevilla	30	17	2	11	75	44	+31	36	
5	Atlético Madrid	30	14	5	11	75	49	+26	33	
6	Valencia	30	13	6	11	58	50	+8	32	
7	Español	30	14	3	13	50	56	−6	31	
8	Real Sociedad	30	11	8	11	48	53	−5	30	
9	Valladolid	30	13	4	13	52	55	−3	30	
10	Celta Vigo	30	12	3	15	52	75	−23	27	
11	Las Palmas	30	11	4	15	49	60	−11	26	
12	Deportivo La Coruña	30	11	4	15	60	80	−20	26	
13	Murcia (R)	30	10	5	15	46	66	−20	25	Qualification for the relegation group
14	Alavés (R)	30	9	6	15	49	73	−24	24	Qualification for the relegation group
15	Cultural Leonesa (R)	30	5	4	21	34	65	−31	14	Relegation to the Segunda División
16	Hércules (R)	30	5	3	22	33	86	−53	13	Relegation to the Segunda División

Source: BDFútbol
Rules for classification: 1) Points; 2) Head-to-head results; 3) Goal difference; 4) Number of goals scored
(C) Champions; (R) Relegated

== Results ==
Home \ Away	ALA	ATB	ATM	BAR	CEL	CUL	DEP	ESP	HER	LPA	MUR	RMA	RSO	SEV	VAL	VAD
Alavés	—	0–3	0–0	1–3	5–1	1–0	4–2	2–0	4–0	2–0	5–2	1–3	1–1	2–1	3–3	3–0
Atlético Bilbao	3–2	—	2–1	1–0	4–0	3–0	2–2	2–1	3–1	5–0	7–1	3–1	3–0	6–1	4–2	3–0
Atlético Madrid	8–1	2–3	—	0–2	3–2	6–1	4–1	5–0	9–0	1–1	4–0	1–0	4–5	4–1	3–1	3–1
Barcelona	3–1	1–2	2–2	—	2–1	4–0	4–1	1–0	6–4	4–0	1–0	2–0	2–0	3–1	4–2	2–0
Celta	3–0	2–0	2–2	0–0	—	3–2	4–1	2–3	2–1	3–0	1–3	3–1	2–1	3–1	2–0	3–0
Cultural Leonesa	4–1	2–3	2–4	0–1	4–1	—	1–2	0–1	3–1	1–2	0–1	0–4	0–0	0–4	3–0	0–0
Deportivo La Coruña	5–3	2–2	3–0	0–7	5–0	4–3	—	3–1	3–0	1–2	2–0	0–2	5–0	3–2	3–3	1–1
Español	6–0	0–1	4–1	0–3	6–1	1–1	3–2	—	2–0	2–2	1–0	2–1	3–0	2–1	0–1	4–3
Hércules	1–1	0–3	0–2	2–3	0–2	3–1	5–1	1–1	—	0–5	2–1	0–4	1–1	1–4	4–0	2–0
Las Palmas	2–1	1–1	1–1	0–1	2–1	1–2	5–0	1–2	6–1	—	2–0	1–3	2–0	2–3	2–0	3–2
Murcia	3–3	2–1	1–0	0–1	2–2	3–1	5–4	2–3	3–1	2–1	—	1–1	6–1	2–0	0–0	0–1
Real Madrid	5–0	2–1	3–2	2–1	8–3	2–1	1–2	7–1	4–1	6–0	7–1	—	2–0	3–4	1–0	5–1
Real Sociedad	1–1	2–2	3–1	1–2	2–1	2–1	3–1	5–0	2–0	4–2	3–3	1–0	—	2–2	3–1	4–1
Sevilla	3–0	1–2	4–0	0–0	7–0	3–1	5–0	4–0	3–0	3–0	4–1	2–0	2–0	—	4–0	4–1
Valencia	3–1	1–0	0–1	4–2	6–0	1–1	4–0	2–1	4–1	4–2	4–1	2–1	1–1	3–0	—	5–1
Valladolid	4–0	2–4	3–1	1–0	4–2	3–0	4–1	2–0	3–0	4–1	3–0	2–2	1–0	3–1	1–1	—

Source: BDFútbol
Legend: Blue = home team win; Yellow = draw; Red = away team win.

== Relegation group ==
=== Standings ===
Pos	Team	Pld	W	D	L	GF	GA	GD	Pts	Qualification
1	España Industrial (Note: For playing in La Liga, España Industrial resigned to continue being the reserve team of Barcelona and was renamed as Condal.) (O, P)	10	7	1	2	21	15	+6	15	Qualification to La Liga
2	Zaragoza (O, P)	10	5	2	3	18	13	+5	12	Qualification to La Liga
3	Oviedo	10	6	0	4	23	22	+1	12	Qualification to Segunda División
4	Murcia (R)	10	5	1	4	21	18	+3	11	Qualification to Segunda División
5	Real Betis	10	2	2	6	21	22	−1	6	Qualification to Segunda División
6	Alavés (R)	10	1	2	7	10	24	−14	4	Qualification to Segunda División

Source: BDFútbol
Rules for classification: 1) Points; 2) Head-to-head results; 3) Goal difference; 4) Number of goals scored
(O) Play-off winners; (P) Promoted; (R) Relegated

=== Results ===
Home \ Away	ALA	ESP	MUR	OVI	BET	ZAR
Deportivo Alavés	—	2–3	1–0	1–3	1–1	1–2
España Industrial	3–1	—	2–1	6–1	3–2	1–0
Murcia	3–2	1–1	—	4–1	5–1	4–3
Oviedo	2–0	0–1	3–0	—	3–2	6–0
Real Betis	6–0	1–2	0–1	4–5	—	3–1
Zaragoza	1–1	1–0	4–2	4–0	1–1	—

Source: BDFútbol
Legend: Blue = home team win; Yellow = draw; Red = away team win.

== Top scorers ==
Rank	Player	Club	Goals
1	(Spain) Alfredo Di Stéfano	Real Madrid	24
2	(Spain) Mauro	Celta	23
3	(Spain) Adrián Escudero	Atlético Madrid	21
