= 1958 Copa del Generalísimo =

56th Copa del Rey

Tournament details
- Country: Spain
- Teams: 16

Final positions
- Champions: Club Atlético de Bilbao (20th title)
- Runners-up: Real Madrid

Tournament statistics
- Matches played: 30
- Goals scored: 94 (3.13 per match)

The 1958 Copa del Generalísimo was the 56th staging of the Spanish Cup. The competition began on 18 May 1958 and concluded on 29 June 1958 with the final.

== Round of 16 ==
Team 1	Agg.	Team 2	1st leg	2nd leg
Club Atlético de Bilbao	4–0	RC Celta de Vigo	3–0	1–0
CA Osasuna	0–1	Real Sociedad de Fútbol	0–0	0–1
Real Gijón	0–7	Valencia CF	0–0	0–7
RCD Español	3–3	Real Valladolid Deportivo	1–1	2–2
Real Zaragoza	3–12	CF Barcelona	3–4	0–8
Real Madrid CF	5–0	Club Atlético de Madrid	4–0	1–0
Real Jaén CF	3–0	Granada CF	1–0	2–0
UD Las Palmas	5–2	Sevilla CF	5–0	0–2

- Tiebreaker

Team 1	Score	Team 2
RCD Español	0–1	Real Valladolid Deportivo

== Quarter-finals ==
Team 1	Agg.	Team 2	1st leg	2nd leg
CF Barcelona	4–0	Valencia CF	3–0	1–0
UD Las Palmas	0–5	Club Atlético de Bilbao	0–4	0–1
Real Jaén CF	2–8	Real Sociedad de Fútbol	2–1	0–7
Real Madrid CF	7–1	Real Valladolid Deportivo	5–1	2–0

== Semi-finals ==
Team 1	Agg.	Team 2	1st leg	2nd leg
Club Atlético de Bilbao	5–4	CF Barcelona	2–0	3–4
Real Madrid CF	5–2	Real Sociedad de Fútbol	4–1	1–1

== Final ==
Team 1	Score	Team 2
Club Atlético de Bilbao	2–0	Real Madrid CF

Copa del Generalísimo
winners
Club Atlético de Bilbao
20th title
