= List of Athletic Bilbao records and statistics =

Athletic Bilbao is a Spanish football club of Bilbao city, founded in 1898. It has played its entire history in La Liga since its creation in 1929, without being relegated, and is the third most successful club in Spain with 37 official honours.

This article contains historical and current statistics and records pertaining to the club.

== Honours ==
National honours
Honour	No.	Years
La Liga	8	1929–30, 1930–31, 1933–34, 1935–36, 1942–43, 1955–56, 1982–83, 1983–84
Copa del Rey	24 (Note: The number of Copa del Rey wins Athletic Bilbao have been credited with is disputed. The 1902 Copa de la Coronación was won by Club Bizcaya, a team made up of players from Athletic Bilbao and Bilbao FC. In 1903 these two clubs merged as Athletic Bilbao and took part in the first official Copa del Rey in 1903. The 1902 trophy is on display in the Athletic museum and the club includes it in its own honours list. However the LFP and RFEF official statistics do not regard this as an official edition of the Copa del Rey won by Athletic.)	1903, 1904, 1910, 1911, 1914, 1915, 1916, 1921, 1923, 1930, 1931, 1932, 1933, 1943, 1944, 1944–45, 1949–50, 1955, 1956, 1958, 1969, 1972–73, 1983–84, 2023–24
Supercopa de España	3	1984, (Note: Cup awarded automatically as the club won both the Copa del Rey and La Liga.) 2015, 2021
Copa Eva Duarte	1	1950

Regional honours
Honour	No.	Years
Copa Vasca	1	1936
Campeonato Regional del Norte	5 (Note: In the 1917–18 North Championship, Athletic 'retired from the competition once finalised'. after finishing top of the table.)	1913-14, 1914-15, 1915-16, 1919-20, 1920-21
Campeonato Regional de Vizcaya	12 (Note: The 1938–39 Biscay Championship was won by Bilbao Athletic, a makeshift squad formed after the Spanish Civil War. The club includes this win and that in the 1935 Copa Vasca (below) for a total of 17.)	1922-23, 1923-24, 1925-26, 1927-28, 1928-29, 1930-31, 1931-32, 1932-33, 1933-34, 1934-35, 1938-39, 1939-40

Other honours
Honour	No.	Years
Betway Cup	1	2019
Copa Vasca (Note: Unofficial version)	1	2004
Euskal Herriko Txapela	3	2018, 2022, 2024
Markus Liebherr Memorial Cup	1	2011
Morocco Summer Cup	1	2008
Small Club World Cup	1	1967
Trofeo Aniversario de San Mamés	1	1963
Trofeo Caja Duero	2	2004, 2007
Trofeo Ciudad de Caracas	1	1967
Trofeo Ciudad de Pamplona	1	2000
Trofeo Ciudad de San Sebastián	1	1966
Trofeo Ciudad de Santander	1	1987
Trofeo Ciudad de Valladolid	2	2012, 2020
Trofeo Ciudad de Vigo	1	1979
Trofeo Colombino	3	1981, 1990, 1999
Trofeo Comunidad Autónoma de La Rioja	1	2010
Trofeo Concepción Arenal	1	1953
Trofeo Corpus de Cádiz	1	1959
Trofeo Costa del Sol	2	1961, 1978
Trofeo Ciudad de Tarragona	1	2007
Trofeo Diputación Foral de Álava	2	1990, 1997
Trofeo Emma Cuervo	1	2003
Trofeo Ibérico	1	1977
Trofeo Lasesarre	2	2007, 2015
Trofeo Luis Otero	1	1961
Trofeo Memorial Juan Rojas	1	2008
Trofeo Ramón de Carranza	1	1972
Trofeo Teresa Herrera	3	1947, 1983, 2018
Trofeo Villa de Bilbao	3	1975, 1977, 1978
Trofeo Villa de Gijón	1	2015

== Awards ==
- Amberes Trophy (2): 1953, 1959
- Martini&Rossi Trophy (1): 1956
- Pichichi Trophy (12): 1930, 1931, 1932, 1940, 1945, 1946, 1947, 1950, 1951, 1953, 1968, 1975.
- Zamora Trophy (7): 1930, 1934, 1936, 1941, 1947, 1970, 2024.

== Club records ==
- One of the three clubs that have never been relegated from La Liga, along with Barcelona and Real Madrid.
- Five-time La Liga and Copa del Rey winner in the same season.
- First team to be permanently awarded the original Liga trophy.
- Won La Liga unbeaten (1929–30 season, joint record).
- Record for biggest Liga win, Athletic Bilbao 12–1 Barcelona (1930–31 season).
- Record for most goals scored in a league match (includes both sides), 14 with Athletic Bilbao 9–5 Racing Santander (1932–33 season).
- Record for most goals scored in a league match as visitors, Osasuna 1–8 Athletic Bilbao (1958–59 season, joint record).
- Record for a draw with the most goals in a league match, Atlético 6–6 Athletic Bilbao (1949–50 season).
- All-time La Liga top goalscorers (as a fraction) in a season (home); with 5.44 goals per match (1930–31 season).
- All-time La Liga goalscorer (as a fraction) in a season (away); with 3.11 goals per match (1931–32 season).
- All-time La Liga goalscorer (as a fraction) in a season; with 4.06 goals per match (1930–31 season).
- Biggest away victories (in percentages) in a season with 8 out of 9, 89% (1932–33 season).
- Biggest number of away points (percentage) in a season with 16 out of 18, 89% (1932–33 season).
- Of the current Primera División teams, heaviest defeats inflicted at home ground against Barcelona, Real Betis, Espanyol and Celta Vigo (also Sporting Gijón, Zaragoza, Tenerife, Salamanca, Mérida and Lleida).
- Of the current Primera División teams, heaviest La Liga defeats inflicted away against Barcelona (0–6), Real Madrid (0–6), Espanyol (1–5) and Osasuna (1–8).
- Most goals scored in a Copa del Rey competition: 12 against Celta Vigo.

== Players ==
Games only include professional matches. Substitute appearances are included. Statistics for current players are updated continuously throughout the year. Players are listed according to the date of their first-team debut for the club.

=== Most appearances ===
Rank	Player	Years	League	Cups (Note: Includes all official Spanish Cup tournaments: Copa del Rey, Supercopa de España, Copa de la Liga and Copa Eva Duarte.)	UEFA	Total
1	(Spain) José Ángel Iribar	1962–1980	466	93	55	614
2	(Spain) Óscar de Marcos	2009–2025	435	61	77	573
3	(Spain) Iker Muniain	2009–2024	434	65	61	560
4	(Spain) Txetxu Rojo	1965–1982	414	87	40	541
5	(Ghana) Iñaki Williams	2014–present	419	58	45	522
6	(Spain) Joseba Etxeberria	1995–2010	445	43	26	514
7	(Spain) Andoni Iraola	2003–2015	406	58	46	510
8	(Spain) Markel Susaeta	2007–2019	379	53	75	507
9	(Spain) Agustín Gaínza	1938–1959	380	108	8	489
10	(Spain) José María Orúe	1950–1968	391	74	18	483

Active
Active with the club
Record

=== Top goalscorers ===
Rank	Player	Years	League	Cups	UEFA	Ratio	Total
1	(Spain) Telmo Zarra	1940–1955	251	84	-	0.95	335
2	(Spain) Dani	1974–1986	147	41	11	0.50	199
3	(Spain) Aritz Aduriz	2002–2020 (Note: 2002-03, 2006-08, 2012-20)	118	20	34	0.42	172
4	(Spain) Eneko Arieta	1951–1966	129	31	5	0.54	165
5	(Spain) José Luis Panizo	1938–1955	126	38	-	0.40	165
6	(Spain) Agustín Gainza	1938–1959	119	30	1	0.31	150
7	(Spain) Guillermo Gorostiza	1929–1940	109	37	-	0.78	146
8	(Spain) Bata	1929–1936	105	36	-	0.90	141
9	(Spain) José Luis Artetxe	1950–1965	105	24	5	0.39	134
10	(Spain) Ismael Urzaiz	1996–2007	116	12	1	0.31	129

Active
Active with the club
Record

=== Players global records ===
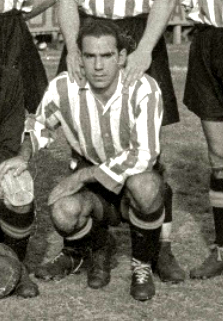
Telmo Zarra is the top goalscorer of Athletic Bilbao history.

- Telmo Zarra is the all-time goalscorer in the history of Copa del Rey, 81 goals.
- Telmo Zarra is the player with the highest number of goals in a Copa del Rey final, 4.
- Telmo Zarra is the Spanish player with most goals scored in the history of La Liga, 251 goals.
- Telmo Zarra is the Spanish player with most Pichichi Trophys, 6.
- Telmo Zarra is the Spanish player with the highest number of hat-tricks in a league season, 23.
- Agustín Gaínza is the top goalscorer in a Copa del Rey match, eight goals (Athletic Bilbao 12–1 Celta Vigo, 1946–47 season).
- Bata is the biggest goalscorer in a single match of La Liga: seven goals (Athletic Bilbao 12–1 Barcelona, 1930–31 season, joint record).
- Agustín Gaínza is the player with most Copa del Rey final wins, 7.
- Agustín Gaínza and José María Belauste are players with most Copa del Rey finals (disputed), both have 9 confirmed wins.
- Agustín Gaínza is the player with most Copa del Rey matches, 99.

=== Individual honours ===
==== Pichichi Trophy ====
The Pichichi Trophy is an award given by the Spanish newspaper Marca to the top scorer of the league season.

Season	Player	Goals	Ratio
1929–30	Guillermo Gorostiza	19	1.05
1930–31	Bata	27	1.58
1931–32	Guillermo Gorostiza	12	0.73
1939–40	Víctor Unamuno	20	0.90
1944–45	Telmo Zarra	19	0.73
1945–46	Telmo Zarra	24	1.33
1946–47	Telmo Zarra	34	1.41
1949–50	Telmo Zarra	35	1.34
1950–51	Telmo Zarra	38	1.26
1952–53	Telmo Zarra	24	0.82
1967–68	Fidel Uriarte	22	0.91
1974–75	Carlos	19	0.59

==== Golden Pichichi Trophy ====
The Golden Pichichi Trophy is a special award given by the newspaper Marca in 2003 as a tribute to the living players with the most Pichichi Trophies in La Liga history. Only Telmo Zarra and Quini have this award.

Year	Player	Goals	Matches	Ratio
2003	Telmo Zarra	251	278	0.91

==== Zamora Trophy ====
The Ricardo Zamora Trophy is an award established by Spanish newspaper Marca in 1958. The award goes to the goalkeeper who has the lowest "goals-to-games" ratio. The list also includes retrospective winners under the same rules before the trophy was introduced.

Season	Player	Ratio	Goals	Matches
1929–30	Gregorio Blasco	1.33	20	15
1933–34	Gregorio Blasco	1.50	21	14
1935–36	Gregorio Blasco	1.47	30	21
1940–41	José María Echevarría	1.16	21	18
1946–47	Raimundo Lezama	1.26	29	23
1969–70	José Ángel Iribar	0.66	20	30
2023–24	Unai Simón	0.92	33	36

==== Zarra Trophy ====
The Zarra Trophy is an award established by Spanish newspaper Marca in 2006. The award goes to the top scorer of Spanish nationality (born or acquired).

Season	Player	Goals
2011–12	Fernando Llorente	17
2014–15	Aritz Aduriz	18
2015–16	Aritz Aduriz	20

== Transfers ==
=== Record transfer fees paid ===
Record transfer fees paid by Athletic Bilbao
Rank	Player	From	Fee	Year	Ref.
1	(Spain) Iñigo Martínez	(Spain) Real Sociedad	€32 million	2018	
2	(Spain) Yuri Berchiche	(France) Paris Saint-Germain	€24 million	2018	
3	(Guinea-Bissau) Álvaro Djaló	(Portugal) Braga	€15 million	2024	
4	(Spain) Roberto Ríos	(Spain) Real Betis	€12 million	1997	
5	(Spain) Álex Berenguer	(Italy) Torino	€12 million	2020	

=== Record transfer fees received ===
Record transfer fees received by Athletic Bilbao
Rank	Player	To	Fee	Year	Ref.
1	(Spain) Kepa Arrizabalaga	(England) Chelsea	€80 million	2018	
2	(France) Aymeric Laporte	(England) Manchester City	€65 million	2018	
3	(Spain) Javi Martínez	(Germany) Bayern Munich	€40 million	2012	
4	(Spain) Ander Herrera	(England) Manchester United	€36 million	2014	
5	(Spain) Asier del Horno	(England) Chelsea	€12 million	2005	

== Trajectory ==
=== League career ===
Athletic Club's finishing positions since 1929.

Data obtained from the official club website.

== Biggest wins ==
=== La Liga ===
Home
Rank	Season	Opponents	Result	Athletic Bilbao scorers
1	1930–31	Barcelona	12–1	Bata (2', 8', 24', 37', 57', 60', 68'), Gorostiza (27'), Lafuente (36'), Garizurieta (55'), Zabalo (71' p.) Iraragorri (83')
2	1950–51	UE Lleida	10–0	Zarra (1', 13', 52', 67', 70', 86'), Venancio (7', 77'), Lasquivar (57'), Nando (83')
3	1941–42	Celta Vigo	10–0	Ortíz (30'), Zarra (32', 36', 68', 71' 85'), Panizo (52', 77'), Viar (56'), Iriondo (88')
4	1951–52	Zaragoza	10–1	Garate (6', 41'), Panizo (7', 11', 60', 79'), Manolín (52'), Venancio (57'), Gaínza (59', 76')
5	1958–59	Celta Vigo	9–0	Merodio (2', 52'), Artetxe (4', 86'), Mauri (10', 25' p., 62'), Uribe (32', 72')
6	1958–59	Sporting Gijón	9–0	Merodio (1', 59', 61'), Uribe (3', 22', 39'), Arieta I (13'), Mauri (35'), Artetxe (66')
7	1933–34	Arenas de Getxo	9–0	Iraragorri (14', 37', 51', 79'), Bata (22', 49', 65'), Careaga (71', 74')
8	1928–29	Espanyol	9–0	Carmelo (18', 32', 70'), Lafuente (39', 58' p., 81'), Calero (49', 86'), Unamuno I (75')
9	1932–33	Real Betis	9–1	Iraragorri (3', 5', 49' p., 69', 76'), Bata (8'), Gorostiza (59', 80')
10	1967–68	Real Betis	8–0	Aranguren (8'), Uriarte (12', 41', 49', 57', 82' p.), Estéfano (32', 64')

Away
Rank	Season	Opponents	Result	Athletic Bilbao scorers
1	1958–59	Osasuna	1–8	Merodio (30', 37', 74', 75', 82'), Mauri (32'), Glaría II (57' p.), Uribe (89')
2	1929–30	Real Sociedad	1–7	Gorostiza (19', 57', 66'), Iraragorri (21', 28', 52'), Unamuno I (59')
3	1945–46	Barcelona	0–6	Gaínza (5'), Zarra (27', 31'), Urra (63', 70'), Iriondo (81')
4	1930–31	Real Madrid	0–6	Gorostiza (2'), Chirri II (10'), Iraragorri (20', 70'), Bata (22'), Lafuente (77')
5	2002–03	Osasuna	1–5	Aitor Ocio (14'), Ezquerro (30'), Yeste (40'), Arriaga (64'), Karanka (77')
6	2020–21	Cádiz	0–4	Berenguer (4', 29'), López (15'), Williams (52')

=== Copa del Rey ===
Home
Rank	Season	Opponents	Result	Athletic Bilbao scorers
1	1946–47	Celta Vigo	12–1	Gainza (9', 40', 53', 54', 71', 76', 77', 78'), Zarra (12'), Iriondo (25', 50'), Panizo (65' p.)
2	1913–14	Vigo Sporting	11–0	Pichichi (x4), Zuazo, J.M. Belauste, Apón (x3), Iceta, R. Belauste
3	1979–80	CD Mungía	8–0	Carlos (8', 73'), Sarabia (9', 30', 35', 39'), Dani (51' p.), Urkiaga (63')
4	1927–28	Gimnástica de Torrelavega	8–0	Calvar (x2), Ayarza (x2), Calero (x3), Ruiz (p.)
5	1978–79	Balmaseda	8–1	Vidal (2'), Bengoetxea (29', 55', 65', 80'), Agirre (35'), Irureta (44'), Simón (60' p.).
6	1941–42	Logroñés	8–1	Iriondo (3', 74'), Zarra (21', 50', 60'), Panizo (62'), Garate (87', 88')
7	1932–33	Deportivo La Coruña	8–1	Bata (x3), Chirri II, Gorostiza, Iraragorri (x2), Lafuente
8	1931–32	Espanyol	8–1	Chirri II (4', 12' p.), Gorostiza (13', 31', 69'), Iraragorri (40'), Bata (80', 88')
9	1948–49	Arenas Zaragoza	7–0	Panizo (7'), Zarra (22', 65'), Venancio (47', 80'), Iriondo (56', 63')
10	1942–43	Castellón	7–0	Anónimo (28' o.g.), Zarra (31', 39', 41', 80'), Garate (33'), Panizo (77')

=== Europe ===
Home
Rank	Season	Opponents	Result	Athletic Bilbao scorers
1	2004–05	(Belgium) Standard Liège	1–7	Ezquerro (6', 9', 55'), Yeste (35'), Iraola (58' p.), Del Horno (63'), J. Etxeberria (71')
2	2012–13	(Finland) HJK	6−0	Aduriz (25', 51), Susaeta (31',57'), I. Pérez (42'), Iraola (85')
3	1976–77	(Hungary) Újpest	5–0	Rojo (13', 45'), Dani (25', 30', 53')
4	1983–84	(Poland) Lech Poznań	4–0	Goikoetxea (11'), Sola (33' p.), Noriega (50'), Urkiaga (84')
5	1976–77	(Italy) Milan	4–1	Dani (44' p., 81'), Carlos (47', 86')
5	1985–86	(Turkey) Beşiktaş	4–1	Urkiaga (31'), J. Salinas (49', 84'), Sarabia (77')
7	2009–10	Austria Wien	0–3	Llorente (19', 84'), San José (84')
8	1977–78	(Hungary) Újpest	3–0	Dani (69', 80'), Tirapu (107')
8	1994–95	(Cyprus) Anorthosis	3–0	Guerrero (16'), J. A. Goikoetxea (24'), Andrinua (88')
8	2009–10	Austria Wien	3–0	Llorente (8', 24'), Muniain (56')
8	2024–25	(Sweden) IF Elfsborg	3–0	Boiro (6'), Prados (24'), Guruzeta (53')

== Footnotes ==
A. The "Europe" column constitutes goals and appearances in the UEFA Competitions.
B. The "Other" column constitutes goals and appearances in the Supercopa de España and the Copa de la Liga.
