= José Luis Ispizua =

Spanish footballer

Personal information
- Full name: José Luis Ispizua Guezuraga
- Date of birth: 1 October 1908
- Place of birth: Bilbao, Biscay, Spain
- Date of death: 11 December 1996 (aged 88)
- Place of death: Spain
- Position: Defender

Senior career*
Years	Team	Apps	(Gls)
1927–1928	Real Unión		
1928–1936	Athletic Bilbao	41	(0)
1941–1944	Real Valladolid		
- * Club domestic league appearances and goals

José Luis Ispizua Guezuraga (1 October 1908 – 11 December 1996) was a Spanish footballer who played as a defender for Athletic Bilbao in the 1930s, with whom he won four La Ligas and four Copa del Rey titles in the 1930s.

== Playing career ==
=== Early career ===
Born on 1 October 1908 in Bilbao, Biscay, Ispizua began his football career in several modest clubs in his hometown, such as Irrintzi Andi in Sendeja, Begoña y Acero in Olaveaga.

=== Athletic Bilbao ===
After one season at Real Unión, he was signed by Athletic Bilbao in 1928, making his debut for the first team in a Biscay Championship match against Deportivo Alavés on 18 November 1928 at the San Mamés, helping his side to a 4–2 win. He played in the inaugural season of La Liga in 1929, making his debut on its 12th matchday against Racing de Santander on 12 May 1929, keeping a clean-sheet in a goalless draw. Despite being Bilbao's second option behind Gregorio Blasco, Ispizua was seen as a trusted alternative, to the point of his contract extension specifying his role as "Blasco's substitute". When he was a substitute, he would always pose for the team photos wearing a beret and trench coat over his goalkeeping uniform, and when he was a starter, he posed normally. Years later, he stated that "he was simply better than me, so I had to wait". He was also noted for his restraint, consistency, and reliability, often in away games.

Together with Blasco, Bata, and Guillermo Gorostiza, he was a member of the great Fred Pentland's Athletic team that won seven Biscay Championships, four La Liga titles (1929–30, 1930–31, 1933–34, and 1935–36) and four consecutive Copa del Reys between 1930 and 1933, although he did not starting in any of the finals. He was also part of the first team to win the league unbeaten in 1930, with 12 wins and 6 draws, and on 8 February 1931, he started for Bilbao in its famous 12–1 victory over Barcelona, which remains the biggest thrashing in La Liga history. At the end of the 1935–36 season, Athletic signed José Luis Molinuevo, a young goalkeeper to replace Blasco, so Ispizua then requested his release from the club, stating "If you bring in a new one now, all you have left is to let me go. Because, what are you going to turn me into? A substitute for the substitute?". In total, he played 81 official matches for Athletic, conceding 130 goals and keeping 14 clean-sheets. In the league, he played a total of 41 matches.

=== Civil War and Valladolid ===
The Bilbao newspapers reported that Ispizua had signed for Osasuna on 18 July 1936, the same day of the Spanish coup of July 1936, which sparked the Spanish Civil War. Like so many others, Ispizua was arrested while defending the city of Bilbao against the Francoist occupation and imprisoned as a "Red separatist who participated in military actions", spending the next four years in various prisons, including El Dueso, where he coincided with another Athletic player, Manuel Castaños.

By the time that he was finally released in 1941, he was weakened physically and mentally, and after failing to return to Athletic, which slammed the door on his face based on his discharge in 1936, the 33-year-old Ispizua attempted to join Osasuna, but the agreement finalized in July 1936 lacked the validity of the federation, almost as if he had never existed. In the end, the only club that helped him was Real Valladolid, with whom he played for four seasons, from 1941 until 1944, the first three in the Segunda División and the last in the Tercera División.

== Death ==
Ispizua died in Bilbao on 11 December 1996, at the age of 88.

== Honours ==
Athletic Bilbao

- La Liga:
  - Champions (4): 1929–30, 1930–31, 1933–34, and 1935–36
- Copa del Rey
  - Champions (4): 1930, 1931, 1932, 1933
- Biscay Championship:
  - Champions (6): 1929, 1931, 1932, 1933, 1934, and 1935
