= 1931 Copa del Rey final =

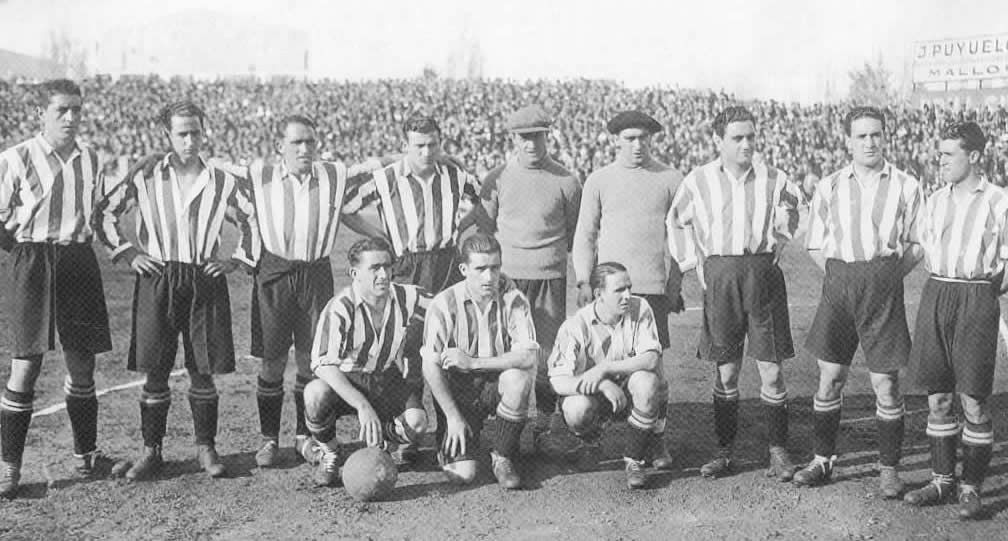
- Athletic Bilbao, champions
- Event: 1931 Copa del Rey
Athletic Bilbao	Betis Balompié
3	1
- Date: June 21, 1931
- Venue: Chamartín, Madrid
- Referee: Jesús Arribas
- Attendance: 20,000

The 1931 Copa del Rey final was the 31st final of the Copa del Rey, the Spanish football cup competition. Athletic Bilbao beat Betis 3–1 and won their eleventh title, the second in a row.

== Match details ==
21 June 1931
17:30 CET

Athletic Bilbao	3–1	Betis Balompié
Chirri II 17'; Roberto 38'; Bata 54'	Report	57' Sanz

Chamartín, Madrid
Attendance: 20,000
Referee: Jesús Arribas

Athletic Bilbao	Betis Balompié

GK	1	(Spain) Gregorio Blasco
DF	2	(Spain) Alfonso Careaga
DF	3	(Spain) José María Castellanos
MF	4	(Spain) Juan Garizurieta (c)
MF	5	(Spain) José Muguerza
MF	6	(Spain) Roberto Etxebarria
FW	7	(Spain) Demetrio Felipés
FW	8	(Spain) José Iraragorri
FW	9	(Spain) Bata
FW	10	(Spain) Chirri II
FW	11	(Spain) Guillermo Gorostiza
Manager:
(England) Fred Pentland

GK	1	(Spain) Jesús Bernáldez	(substituted off) 45'
DF	2	(Spain) Andrés Aranda (c)
DF	3	(Spain) Jesús Ruiz
MF	4	(Spain) Peral
MF	5	(Spain) Enrique Soladrero
MF	6	(Spain) Adolfo Sancha
FW	7	(Spain) Timimi
FW	8	(Spain) Adolfo Martín
FW	9	(Spain) Rosendo Romero
FW	10	(Spain) Enrique Garrido
FW	11	(Spain) Rafael Sanz
Substitutions:
GK	--	(Spain) Juan Pedrosa	(substituted on) 45'
Manager:
(Spain) Emilio Sampere

Copa del Rey 1931 winners
Athletic Bilbao
11th title
