= List of Spanish football champions =

- Spain
- Founded: 1929
- Country: Spain
- Confederation: UEFA
- Number of clubs: 20
- Current champions: Barcelona (29th title) (2025–26)
- Most championships: Real Madrid (36 titles)
- Current: 2026–27 La Liga

The Spanish football champions are the winners La Liga, the primary football competition in Spain. The league is contested on a round-robin basis, with the title awarded to the team that finishes top at the end of the season. First established in 1929 with ten teams, La Liga has featured 20 teams since 1997. Before the league's formation, the Copa del Rey—a regionalised cup competition—was effectively considered the national championship. The league was suspended between 1936 and 1939 due to the Spanish Civil War.

Real Madrid is the most successful club, with 36 league titles, followed by Barcelona with 29. Barcelona has won the double (winning the league and cup in the same season) a record nine times, ahead of Athletic Bilbao’s five. Barcelona is also one of only two European clubs—alongside Bayern Munich, who joined them in 2020—to have won the treble twice, most recently in 2015. The current champions are Barcelona, who claimed their 29th title in the 2025–26 season.

The three lowest-placed teams in La Liga are relegated to the Segunda División and replaced by the top three from that division. Of the league’s founding clubs, only Athletic Bilbao, Barcelona, and Real Madrid have never been relegated.

== Champions ==
Key
†	Champions also won the Copa del Rey that season
†	Champions also won the European Cup/UEFA Champions League that season
‡	Champions also won the UEFA Cup/UEFA Europa League that season
*	Champions also won the Copa del Rey and the European Cup/UEFA Champions League that season

- The "Top scorer(s)" column refers to the player who scored the most goals during that season
- The "Goals" column refers to the number of goals scored by the top scorer in the league in that season

Season	Winners	Pts	Runners-up	Pts	Third place	Pts	Top scorer(s)	Top scorer's club(s)	Goals
1929	Barcelona (1)	25	Madrid FC (Note: Real Madrid were known as Madrid FC from 1931 until 1941.) (1)	23	Athletic Bilbao (1)	20	Paco Bienzobas	Real Sociedad	14
1929–30	Athletic Bilbao (1) ^{†}	30	Barcelona (1)	23	Arenas (1)	20	Guillermo Gorostiza	Athletic Bilbao	19
1930–31	Athletic Bilbao (2) ^{†}	22	Racing Santander (1)	22	Real Sociedad (1)	22	Bata	Athletic Bilbao	27
1931–32	Madrid FC (1)	28	Athletic Bilbao (1)	25	Barcelona (1)	24	Guillermo Gorostiza	Athletic Bilbao	12
1932–33	Madrid FC (2)	28	Athletic Bilbao (2)	26	Espanyol (1)	22	Manuel Olivares	Madrid FC	16
1933–34	Athletic Bilbao (3)	24	Madrid FC (2)	22	Racing Santander (1)	19	Isidro Lángara	Oviedo	27
1934–35	Real Betis (1)	34	Madrid FC (3)	33	Oviedo (1)	26	Isidro Lángara	Oviedo	26
1935–36	Athletic Bilbao (4)	31	Madrid FC (4)	29	Oviedo (2)	28	Isidro Lángara	Oviedo	27
1936–37	Not played due to the Spanish Civil War								
1937–38	Not played due to the Spanish Civil War								
1938–39	Not played due to the Spanish Civil War								
1939–40	Atlético Aviación (Note: Atlético Madrid were known as Atlético Aviación from 1939 until 1947.) (1)	29	Sevilla (1)	28	Athletic Bilbao (2)	26	Víctor Unamuno	Athletic Bilbao	22
1940–41	Atlético Aviación (2)	33	Athletic Bilbao (3)	31	Valencia (1)	27	Pruden	Atlético Aviación	30
1941–42	Valencia (1)	40	Real Madrid (5)	33	Atlético Aviación (1)	33	Edmundo Suárez	Valencia	27
1942–43	Athletic Bilbao (5) ^{†}	36	Sevilla (2)	33	Barcelona (2)	32	Mariano Martín	Barcelona	32
1943–44	Valencia (2)	40	Atlético Aviación (1)	34	Sevilla (1)	32	Edmundo Suárez	Valencia	27
1944–45	Barcelona (2)	39	Real Madrid (6)	38	Atlético Aviación (2)	31	Telmo Zarra	Atlético Bilbao	19
1945–46	Sevilla (1)	36	Barcelona (2)	35	Athletic Bilbao (3)	35	Telmo Zarra	Atlético Bilbao	24
1946–47	Valencia (3)	34	Athletic Bilbao (4)	34	Atlético Aviación (3)	32	Telmo Zarra	Atlético Bilbao	34
1947–48	Barcelona (3)	37	Valencia (1)	34	Atlético Madrid (1)	33	Pahiño	Celta Vigo	23
1948–49	Barcelona (4)	37	Valencia (2)	35	Real Madrid (1)	34	César Rodríguez	Barcelona	28
1949–50	Atlético Madrid (3)	33	Deportivo La Coruña (1)	32	Valencia (2)	31	Telmo Zarra	Athletic Bilbao	25
1950–51	Atlético Madrid (4)	40	Sevilla (3)	38	Valencia (3)	37	Telmo Zarra	Athletic Bilbao	38
1951–52	Barcelona (5) ^{†}	43	Athletic Bilbao (5)	40	Real Madrid (2)	38	Pahiño	Real Madrid	28
1952–53	Barcelona (6) ^{†}	42	Valencia (3)	40	Real Madrid (3)	39	Telmo Zarra	Athletic Bilbao	24
1953–54	Real Madrid (3)	40	Barcelona (3)	36	Valencia (4)	34	Alfredo Di Stéfano	Real Madrid	27
1954–55	Real Madrid (4)	46	Barcelona (4)	41	Athletic Bilbao (4)	39	Juan Arza	Sevilla	28
1955–56	Athletic Bilbao (6) ^{†}	48	Barcelona (5)	47	Real Madrid (4)	38	Alfredo Di Stéfano	Real Madrid	24
1956–57	Real Madrid (5) ^{†}	44	Sevilla (4)	39	Barcelona (3)	39	Alfredo Di Stéfano	Real Madrid	31
1957–58	Real Madrid (6) ^{†}	45	Atlético Madrid (2)	42	Barcelona (4)	38	Ricardo Alós Manuel Badenes Alfredo Di Stéfano	Valencia Valladolid Real Madrid	19
1958–59	Barcelona (7) ^{†}	51	Real Madrid (7)	47	Athletic Bilbao (5)	36	Alfredo Di Stéfano	Real Madrid	23
1959–60	Barcelona (8)	46	Real Madrid (8)	46	Athletic Bilbao (6)	39	Ferenc Puskás	Real Madrid	26
1960–61	Real Madrid (7)	52	Atlético Madrid (3)	40	Zaragoza (1)	33	Ferenc Puskás	Real Madrid	27
1961–62	Real Madrid (8) ^{†}	43	Barcelona (6)	40	Atlético Madrid (2)	36	Juan Seminario	Zaragoza	25
1962–63	Real Madrid (9)	49	Atlético Madrid (4)	37	Oviedo (3)	33	Ferenc Puskás	Real Madrid	26
1963–64	Real Madrid (10)	46	Barcelona (7)	42	Real Betis (1)	37	Ferenc Puskás	Real Madrid	20
1964–65	Real Madrid (11)	47	Atlético Madrid (5)	43	Zaragoza (2)	40	Cayetano Ré	Barcelona	25
1965–66	Atlético Madrid (5)	44	Real Madrid (9)	43	Barcelona (5)	38	Vavá II	Elche	19
1966–67	Real Madrid (12)	47	Barcelona (8)	42	Espanyol (2)	37	Waldo	Valencia	24
1967–68	Real Madrid (13)	42	Barcelona (9)	39	Las Palmas (1)	38	Fidel Uriarte	Athletic Bilbao	22
1968–69	Real Madrid (14)	47	Las Palmas (1)	38	Barcelona (6)	36	Amancio Amaro José Eulogio Gárate	Real Madrid Atlético Madrid	14
1969–70	Atlético Madrid (6)	42	Athletic Bilbao (6)	41	Sevilla (2)	35	Amancio Amaro Luis Aragonés José Eulogio Gárate	Real Madrid Atlético Madrid Atlético Madrid	16
1970–71	Valencia (4)	43	Barcelona (10)	43	Atlético Madrid (3)	42	José Eulogio Gárate Carles Rexach	Atlético Madrid Barcelona	17
1971–72	Real Madrid (15)	47	Valencia (4)	45	Barcelona (7)	43	Enrique Porta	Granada	20
1972–73	Atlético Madrid (7)	48	Barcelona (11)	46	Espanyol (3)	45	Marianín	Oviedo	19
1973–74	Barcelona (9)	50	Atlético Madrid (6)	42	Zaragoza (3)	40	Quini	Sporting Gijón	20
1974–75	Real Madrid (16) ^{†}	50	Zaragoza (1)	38	Barcelona (8)	37	Carlos	Athletic Bilbao	19
1975–76	Real Madrid (17)	48	Barcelona (12)	43	Atlético Madrid (4)	42	Quini	Sporting Gijón	21
1976–77	Atlético Madrid (8)	46	Barcelona (13)	45	Athletic Bilbao (7)	38	Mario Kempes	Valencia	24
1977–78	Real Madrid (18)	47	Barcelona (14)	41	Athletic Bilbao (8)	40	Mario Kempes	Valencia	28
1978–79	Real Madrid (19)	47	Sporting Gijón (1)	43	Atlético Madrid (5)	41	Hans Krankl	Barcelona	29
1979–80	Real Madrid (20) ^{†}	53	Real Sociedad (1)	52	Sporting Gijón (1)	39	Quini	Sporting Gijón	24
1980–81	Real Sociedad (1)	45	Real Madrid (10)	45	Atlético Madrid (6)	42	Quini	Barcelona	20
1981–82	Real Sociedad (2)	47	Barcelona (15)	45	Real Madrid (5)	44	Quini	Barcelona	26
1982–83	Athletic Bilbao (7)	50	Real Madrid (11)	49	Atlético Madrid (7)	46	Poli Rincón	Real Betis	20
1983–84	Athletic Bilbao (8) ^{†}	49	Real Madrid (12)	49	Barcelona (9)	48	Jorge da Silva Juanito	Valladolid Real Madrid	17
1984–85	Barcelona (10)	53	Atlético Madrid (7)	43	Athletic Bilbao (9)	41	Hugo Sánchez	Atlético Madrid	19
1985–86	Real Madrid (21) ‡	56	Barcelona (16)	45	Athletic Bilbao (10)	43	Hugo Sánchez	Real Madrid	22
1986–87	Real Madrid (22)	66	Barcelona (17)	63	Espanyol (4)	51	Hugo Sánchez	Real Madrid	34
1987–88	Real Madrid (23)	62	Real Sociedad (2)	51	Atlético Madrid (8)	48	Hugo Sánchez	Real Madrid	29
1988–89	Real Madrid (24) ^{†}	62	Barcelona (18)	57	Valencia (5)	49	Baltazar	Atlético Madrid	35
1989–90	Real Madrid (25)	62	Valencia (5)	53	Barcelona (10)	51	Hugo Sánchez	Real Madrid	38
1990–91	Barcelona (11)	57	Atlético Madrid (8)	47	Real Madrid (6)	46	Emilio Butragueño	Real Madrid	19
1991–92	Barcelona (12) †	55	Real Madrid (13)	54	Atlético Madrid (9)	53	Manolo	Atlético Madrid	27
1992–93	Barcelona (13)	58	Real Madrid (14)	57	Deportivo La Coruña (1)	54	Bebeto	Deportivo La Coruña	29
1993–94	Barcelona (14)	56	Deportivo La Coruña (2)	56	Zaragoza (4)	46	Romário	Barcelona	30
1994–95	Real Madrid (26)	55	Deportivo La Coruña (3)	51	Real Betis (2)	46	Iván Zamorano	Real Madrid	28
1995–96 (Note: The first season with a modern three points-for-a-win format.)	Atlético Madrid (9) ^{†}	87	Valencia (6)	83	Barcelona (11)	80	Juan Antonio Pizzi	Tenerife	31
1996–97	Real Madrid (27)	92	Barcelona (19)	90	Deportivo La Coruña (2)	77	Ronaldo	Barcelona	34
1997–98	Barcelona (15) ^{†}	74	Athletic Bilbao (7)	65	Real Sociedad (2)	63	Christian Vieri	Atlético Madrid	24
1998–99	Barcelona (16)	79	Real Madrid (15)	68	Mallorca (1)	66	Raúl	Real Madrid	25
1999–2000	Deportivo La Coruña (1)	69	Barcelona (20)	64	Valencia (6)	64	Salva Ballesta	Racing Santander	27
2000–01	Real Madrid (28)	80	Deportivo La Coruña (4)	73	Mallorca (2)	71	Raúl	Real Madrid	24
2001–02	Valencia (5)	75	Deportivo La Coruña (5)	68	Real Madrid (7)	66	Diego Tristán	Deportivo La Coruña	21
2002–03	Real Madrid (29)	78	Real Sociedad (3)	76	Deportivo La Coruña (3)	72	Roy Makaay	Deportivo La Coruña	29
2003–04	Valencia (6) ‡	77	Barcelona (21)	72	Deportivo La Coruña (4)	71	Ronaldo	Real Madrid	25
2004–05	Barcelona (17)	84	Real Madrid (16)	80	Villarreal (1)	65	Diego Forlán	Villarreal	25
2005–06	Barcelona (18) †	82	Real Madrid (17)	70	Valencia (7)	69	Samuel Eto'o	Barcelona	26
2006–07	Real Madrid (30)	76	Barcelona (22)	76	Sevilla (3)	71	Ruud van Nistelrooy	Real Madrid	25
2007–08	Real Madrid (31)	85	Villarreal (1)	77	Barcelona (12)	67	Dani Güiza	Mallorca	27
2008–09	Barcelona (19) *	87	Real Madrid (18)	78	Sevilla (4)	70	Diego Forlán	Atlético Madrid	32
2009–10	Barcelona (20)	99	Real Madrid (19)	96	Valencia (8)	71	Lionel Messi	Barcelona	34
2010–11	Barcelona (21) †	96	Real Madrid (20)	92	Valencia (9)	71	Cristiano Ronaldo	Real Madrid	40
2011–12	Real Madrid (32)	100	Barcelona (23)	91	Valencia (10)	61	Lionel Messi	Barcelona	50
2012–13	Barcelona (22)	100	Real Madrid (21)	85	Atlético Madrid (10)	76	Lionel Messi	Barcelona	46
2013–14	Atlético Madrid (10)	90	Barcelona (24)	87	Real Madrid (8)	87	Cristiano Ronaldo	Real Madrid	31
2014–15	Barcelona (23) *	94	Real Madrid (22)	92	Atlético Madrid (11)	78	Cristiano Ronaldo	Real Madrid	48
2015–16	Barcelona (24) ^{†}	91	Real Madrid (23)	90	Atlético Madrid (12)	88	Luis Suárez	Barcelona	40
2016–17	Real Madrid (33) †	93	Barcelona (25)	90	Atlético Madrid (13)	78	Lionel Messi	Barcelona	37
2017–18	Barcelona (25) ^{†}	93	Atlético Madrid (9)	79	Real Madrid (9)	76	Lionel Messi	Barcelona	34
2018–19	Barcelona (26)	87	Atlético Madrid (10)	76	Real Madrid (10)	68	Lionel Messi	Barcelona	36
2019–20	Real Madrid (34)	87	Barcelona (26)	82	Atlético Madrid (14)	70	Lionel Messi	Barcelona	25
2020–21	Atlético Madrid (11)	86	Real Madrid (24)	84	Barcelona (13)	79	Lionel Messi	Barcelona	30
2021–22	Real Madrid (35) †	86	Barcelona (27)	73	Atlético Madrid (15)	71	Karim Benzema	Real Madrid	27
2022–23	Barcelona (27)	88	Real Madrid (25)	78	Atlético Madrid (16)	77	Robert Lewandowski	Barcelona	23
2023–24	Real Madrid (36) †	95	Barcelona (28)	85	Girona (1)	81	Artem Dovbyk	Girona	24
2024–25	Barcelona (28) ^{†}	88	Real Madrid (26)	84	Atlético Madrid (17)	76	Kylian Mbappé	Real Madrid	31
2025–26	Barcelona (29)	94	Real Madrid (27)	86	Villarreal (2)	72	Kylian Mbappé	Real Madrid	25

== Total La Liga titles won ==
Clubs in bold are competing in La Liga as of the 2026–27 season.

Location of Spanish football champions

Club	Winners	Runners-up
**Real Madrid**	36	27
**Barcelona**	29	28
**Atlético Madrid**	11	10
**Athletic Bilbao**	8	7
**Valencia**	6	6
**Real Sociedad**	2	3
**Deportivo La Coruña**	1	5
**Sevilla**	1	4
**Real Betis**	1	0
**Racing de Santander**	0	1
Las Palmas	0	1
Real Zaragoza	0	1
Sporting Gijón	0	1
**Villarreal**	0	1

Titles won by club (%)
1. Real Madrid – 36 (37.9%)
2. Barcelona – 29 (30.5%)
3. Atlético Madrid – 11 (11.6%)
4. Athletic Bilbao – 8 (8.42%)
5. Valencia – 6 (6.32%)
6. Real Sociedad – 2 (2.11%)
7. Deportivo La Coruña – 1 (1.05%)
8. Sevilla – 1 (1.05%)
9. Real Betis - 1 (1.05%)

=== By city ===
City	Championships	Club(s) (titles)
Madrid	47	Real Madrid (36), Atlético Madrid (11)
Barcelona	29	Barcelona (29)
Bilbao	8	Athletic Bilbao (8)
Valencia	6	Valencia (6)
San Sebastián	2	Real Sociedad (2)
Seville	2	Real Betis (1), Sevilla (1)
A Coruña	1	Deportivo La Coruña (1)

=== By Autonomous Community ===
Community	Championships	Club(s) (titles)
Madrid	47	Real Madrid (36), Atlético Madrid (11)
Catalonia	29	Barcelona (29)
Basque Country	10	Athletic Bilbao (8), Real Sociedad (2)
Valencia	6	Valencia (6)
Andalusia	2	Real Betis (1), Sevilla (1)
Galicia	1	Deportivo La Coruña (1)

== See also ==
- La Liga
- Copa del Rey
- Supercopa de España
- Football in Spain
- Liga F (Spanish women's championship)
