= Galician derby =

Football rivalry in Galicia, Spain

- Other names: O derbi galego
- Location: Galicia
- Teams: Celta Vigo; Deportivo A Coruña
- First meeting: 19 February 1928; 1928 Copa del Rey; Celta 2–1 Deportivo
- Latest meeting: 5 May 2018; La Liga; Celta 1–1 Deportivo
- Next meeting: 3 January 2027; La Liga; Celta v Deportivo
- Stadiums: Balaídos (Vigo); Riazor (A Coruña)

Statistics
- Total meetings: 126
- Most wins: Celta Vigo (50)
- Largest victory: Celta 8–0 Deportivo (27 April 1941)

The Galician derby (Galician: O derbi galego) is the name given to any association football match contested between Celta Vigo and Deportivo A Coruña, the two biggest clubs in Galicia.

== Head-to-head statistics ==
As of 5 May 2018

Competition	Celta wins	Draws	Dep. wins
La Liga	26	19	25
Segunda División	19	8	17
Segunda División B	1	1	0
Copa del Rey	4	3	3
Total	50	31	45

== League matches ==
Year	Competition	Date	Home team	Result	Away team
1929	Segunda División	10-03-1929	Deportivo	4–2	Celta
1929	Segunda División	30-05-1929	Celta	1–1	Deportivo
1931–32	Segunda División	03-01-1932	Celta	2–1	Deportivo
1931–32	Segunda División	06-03-1932	Deportivo	5–0	Celta
1932–33	Segunda División	15-01-1933	Deportivo	7–2	Celta
1932–33	Segunda División	19-03-1933	Celta	4–1	Deportivo
1933–34	Segunda División	?	Celta	3–2	Deportivo
1933–34	Segunda División	?	Deportivo	4–1	Celta
1934–35	Segunda División	?	Celta	5–1	Deportivo
1934–35	Segunda División	?	Deportivo	4–2	Celta
1935–36	Segunda División	?	Celta	5–0	Deportivo
1935–36	Segunda División	?	Deportivo	2–1	Celta
1941–42	La Liga	19-10-1941	Celta	2–1	Deportivo
1941–42	La Liga	25-01-1942	Deportivo	4–0	Celta
1942–43	La Liga	15-11-1942	Celta	0–1	Deportivo
1942–43	La Liga	28-02-1943	Deportivo	3–1	Celta
1943–44	La Liga	12-12-1943	Celta	0–0	Deportivo
1943–44	La Liga	26-03-1944	Deportivo	3–2	Celta
1946–47	La Liga	08-12-1946	Deportivo	1–4	Celta
1946–47	La Liga	06-04-1947	Celta	4–2	Deportivo
1948–49	La Liga	28-11-1948	Celta	1–1	Deportivo
1948–49	La Liga	10-04-1949	Deportivo	3–3	Celta
1949–50	La Liga	13-11-1949	Deportivo	1–1	Celta
1949–50	La Liga	12-03-1950	Celta	2–3	Deportivo
1950–51	La Liga	24-09-1950	Deportivo	4–1	Celta
1950–51	La Liga	14-01-1951	Celta	1–2	Deportivo
1951–52	La Liga	09-12-1951	Deportivo	3–0	Celta
1951–52	La Liga	06-04-1952	Celta	6–1	Deportivo
1952–53	La Liga	12-10-1952	Celta	2–0	Deportivo
1952–53	La Liga	15-02-1953	Deportivo	3–2	Celta
1953–54	La Liga	27-09-1953	Celta	3–1	Deportivo
1953–54	La Liga	24-01-1954	Deportivo	0–0	Celta
1954–55	La Liga	10-10-1954	Deportivo	4–2	Celta
1954–55	La Liga	23-01-1955	Celta	2–0	Deportivo
1955–56	La Liga	13-11-1955	Celta	4–1	Deportivo
1955–56	La Liga	18-03-1956	Deportivo	5–0	Celta
1956–57	La Liga	11-11-1956	Deportivo	0–3	Celta
1956–57	La Liga	03-03-1957	Celta	1–1	Deportivo
1959–60	Segunda División	25-10-1959	Deportivo	2–1	Celta
1959–60	Segunda División	14-02-1960	Celta	4–0	Deportivo
1960–61	Segunda División	09-10-1960	Deportivo	0–1	Celta
1960–61	Segunda División	05-02-1961	Celta	3–0	Deportivo
1961–62	Segunda División	24-09-1961	Celta	1–1	Deportivo
1961–62	Segunda División	14-01-1962	Deportivo	2–0	Celta
1963–64	Segunda División	22-12-1963	Celta	1–0	Deportivo
1963–64	Segunda División	12-04-1964	Deportivo	2–1	Celta
1965–66	Segunda División	21-11-1965	Celta	0–0	Deportivo
1965–66	Segunda División	27-02-1966	Deportivo	0–0	Celta
1967–68	Segunda División	29-10-1967	Deportivo	1–0	Celta
1967–68	Segunda División	18-02-1968	Celta	3–2	Deportivo
1969–70	La Liga	07-12-1969	Celta	2–2	Deportivo
1969–70	La Liga	05-04-1970	Deportivo	0–1	Celta
1971–72	La Liga	14-11-1970	Deportivo	0–1	Celta
1971–72	La Liga	19-03-1972	Celta	3–1	Deportivo
1972–73	La Liga	03-12-1972	Deportivo	1–0	Celta
1972–73	La Liga	22-04-1973	Celta	1–0	Deportivo
1975–76	Segunda División	23-11-1975	Deportivo	2–0	Celta
1975–76	Segunda División	04-04-1976	Celta	1–1	Deportivo
1977–78	Segunda División	08-12-1977	Deportivo	1–2	Celta
1977–78	Segunda División	23-04-1978	Celta	1–0	Deportivo
1979–80	Segunda División	02-12-1979	Celta	2–0	Deportivo
1979–80	Segunda División	27-04-1980	Deportivo	2–1	Celta
1980–81	Segunda División B	26-10-1980	Celta	1–0	Deportivo
1980–81	Segunda División B	08-03-1981	Deportivo	1–1	Celta
1981–82	Segunda División	25-10-1981	Deportivo	1–1	Celta
1981–82	Segunda División	28-02-1982	Celta	1–0	Deportivo
1983–84	Segunda División	04-12-1983	Celta	0–0	Deportivo
1983–84	Segunda División	22-04-1984	Deportivo	1–3	Celta
1984–85	Segunda División	11-11-1984	Deportivo	3–2	Celta
1984–85	Segunda División	24-03-1985	Celta	5–0	Deportivo
1986–87	Segunda División	23-11-1986	Deportivo	3–0	Celta
1986–87	Segunda División	22-03-1987	Celta	2–0	Deportivo
1986–87	Segunda División	03-05-1987	Celta	3–0	Deportivo
1986–87	Segunda División	06-06-1987	Deportivo	0–1	Celta
1990–91	Segunda División	09-12-1990	Deportivo	3–0	Celta
1990–91	Segunda División	04-05-1991	Celta	0–0	Deportivo
1992–93	La Liga	06-09-1992	Deportivo	2–0	Celta
1992–93	La Liga	31-01-1993	Celta	0–0	Deportivo
1993–94	La Liga	05-09-1993	Deportivo	0–0	Celta
1993–94	La Liga	23-01-1994	Celta	0–0	Deportivo
1994–95	La Liga	21-12-1994	Deportivo	1–2	Celta
1994–95	La Liga	21-05-1995	Celta	0–2	Deportivo
1995–96	La Liga	11-11-1995	Celta	0–0	Deportivo
1995–96	La Liga	27-03-1996	Deportivo	2–1	Celta
1996–97	La Liga	08-09-1996	Celta	1–1	Deportivo
1996–97	La Liga	09-02-1997	Deportivo	2–2	Celta
1997–98	La Liga	25-10-1997	Deportivo	1–1	Celta
1997–98	La Liga	01-03-1998	Celta	2–1	Deportivo
1998–99	La Liga	30-08-1998	Celta	0–0	Deportivo
1998–99	La Liga	31-01-1999	Deportivo	2–1	Celta
1999–00	La Liga	18-12-1999	Deportivo	1–0	Celta
1999–00	La Liga	30-04-2000	Celta	2–1	Deportivo
2000–01	La Liga	26-11-2000	Deportivo	1–0	Celta
2000–01	La Liga	21-04-2001	Celta	2–1	Deportivo
2001–02	La Liga	30-09-2001	Deportivo	2–2	Celta
2001–02	La Liga	05-02-2002	Celta	0–2	Deportivo
2002–03	La Liga	04-01-2003	Deportivo	3–0	Celta
2002–03	La Liga	24-05-2003	Celta	3–0	Deportivo
2003–04	La Liga	03-01-2004	Celta	0–5	Deportivo
2003–04	La Liga	15-05-2004	Deportivo	3–0	Celta
2005–06	La Liga	17-12-2005	Celta	0–3	Deportivo
2005–06	La Liga	29-04-2006	Deportivo	0–2	Celta
2006–07	La Liga	19-11-2006	Deportivo	0–1	Celta
2006–07	La Liga	15-04-2007	Celta	1–0	Deportivo
2011–12	Segunda División	13-11-2011	Deportivo	2–1	Celta
2011–12	Segunda División	15-04-2012	Celta	2–3	Deportivo
2012–13	La Liga	27-10-2012	Celta	1–1	Deportivo
2012–13	La Liga	15-03-2013	Deportivo	3–1	Celta
2014–15	La Liga	23-09-2014	Celta	2–1	Deportivo
2014–15	La Liga	21-02-2015	Deportivo	0–2	Celta
2015–16	La Liga	21-11-2015	Deportivo	2–0	Celta
2015–16	La Liga	02-04-2016	Celta	1–1	Deportivo
2016–17	La Liga	23-10-2016	Celta	4–1	Deportivo
2016–17	La Liga	19-03-2017	Deportivo	0–1	Celta
2017–18	La Liga	23-12-2017	Deportivo	1–3	Celta
2017–18	La Liga	05-05-2018	Celta	1–1	Deportivo
2026–27	La Liga	03-01-2027	Celta		Deportivo
2026–27	La Liga	18-04-2027	Deportivo		Celta

== Cup matches ==
Season	Date	Home team	Result	Away team
1928	19-02-1928	Celta	2–1	Deportivo
1928	18-03-1928	Deportivo	3–3	Celta
1941	20-04-1941	Deportivo	2–3	Celta
1941	27-04-1941	Celta	8–0	Deportivo
1970–71	20-05-1971	Deportivo	0–0	Celta
1970–71	26-05-1971	Celta	0–2	Deportivo
1980–81	17-09-1980	Deportivo	4–3	Celta
1980–81	01-10-1980	Celta	5–2	Deportivo
1998–99	20-01-1999	Celta	0–1	Deportivo
1998–99	03-02-1999	Deportivo	1–1	Celta

== Head-to-head ranking in La Liga (1929–2026) ==
P.	29	30	31	32	33	34	35	36	40	41	42	43	44	45	46	47	48	49	50	51	52	53	54	55	56	57	58	59	60	61	62	63	64	65	66	67	68	69	70	71	72	73	74	75	76	77	78	79	80	81	82	83	84	85	86	87	88	89	90	91	92	93	94	95	96	97	98	99	00	01	02	03	04	05	06	07	08	09	10	11	12	13	14	15	16	17	18	19	20	21	22	23	24	25	26
1																																																																					1																										
2																			2																																												2	2						2	2																								
3																																																														3				3						3	3																						
4											4						4																																																							4																							
5											5	5																																																								5			5																								
6																																								6																											6	6		6					6										6										6
7																			7				7	7			7																														7												7									7																7	
8																				8																																						8																8	8									8						8					
9												9				9					9																																												9												9						9												
10									10	10					10			10					10		10													10	10		10																																						10																
11																		11			11			11																																						11			11																										11				
12													12							12					12																		12																								12																												
13																13						13				13																																						13												13										13	13					13	13		
14													14	14								14										14							14		14																																																						
15																										15																15																					15																						15										
16																												16						16		16												16																		16																		16		16									
17																																										17		17		17						17									17																					17						17	17						
18																																																							18																					18				18							18								
19																																																											19														19									19													
20																																																																																															
21																																																																																															
22																																																																																															

• Summary: Celta with 18 higher finishes and Deportivo with 17 higher finishes (only including seasons in which both teams played in La Liga).
