= 1932 Copa del Presidente de la República final =

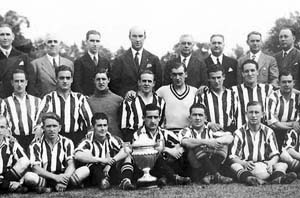
- Team of Athletic Bilbao, champions
- Event: 1932 Copa del Presidente de la República
| Athletic Bilbao | FC Barcelona |
| 1 | 0 |
- Date: 19 June 1932
- Venue: Chamartín, Madrid
- Referee: Pedro Escartín
- Attendance: 25,000

The 1932 Copa del Presidente de la República final was the 32nd final of the principal Spanish football cup competition, now known as the Copa del Rey. Athletic Bilbao beat FC Barcelona 1–0 and won their 12th title, the third in a row.

== Road to the final ==
| Athletic Bilbao | | | Round | FC Barcelona |
|---|---|---|---|---|---|---|
| Opponent | Result | Legs | Knockout phase | Opponent | Result | Legs |
| Unión Club | 7–1 | 1–2 away; 4–0 home | Round of 16 | Valencia CF | 5–2 | 2–0 home; 2–3 away |
| CD Alavés | 5–2 | 2–0 home; 3–2 away | Quarter-finals | Donostia FC | 2–1 | 1–0 home; 1–1 away |
| CD Español | 12–1 | 8–1 home; 4–0 away | Semi-finals | Celta de Vigo | 4–2 | 3–0 home; 1–2 away |

== Match details ==
19 June 1932
17:15 CET

| Athletic Bilbao | 1–0 | FC Barcelona |
|---|---|---|
| Bata 55' |

Estadio Chamartín, Madrid
Attendance: 25,000
Referee: Pedro Escartín

| Athletic Bilbao | Barcelona |

| GK | 1 | (Spain) Gregorio Blasco |
| DF | 2 | (Spain) José María Castellanos |
| DF | 3 | (Spain) Juan Urquizu |
| MF | 4 | (Spain) Luis María Uribe |
| MF | 5 | (Spain) José Muguerza |
| MF | 6 | (Spain) Roberto Etxebarria |
| FW | 7 | (Spain) Lafuente (c) |
| FW | 8 | (Spain) José Iraragorri |
| FW | 9 | (Spain) Bata |
| FW | 10 | (Spain) Chirri II |
| FW | 11 | (Spain) Guillermo Gorostiza |
Manager:
(England) Fred Pentland

| GK | 1 | (Spain) Juan José Nogués |
| DF | 2 | (Spain) Ramón Zabalo |
| DF | 3 | (Spain) Francisco Alcoriza |
| MF | 4 | (Spain) Cristóbal Martí |
| MF | 5 | (Spain) Ramón Guzmán |
| MF | 6 | (Spain) Patricio Arnau |
| FW | 7 | (Spain) Vicente Piera |
| FW | 8 | (Spain) Ángel Arocha |
| FW | 9 | (Spain) Josep Samitier (c) |
| FW | 10 | (Spain) Juan Ramón |
| FW | 11 | (Spain) Esteban Pedrol |
Manager:
(England) Jack Greenwell

Copa del Rey 1932 winners
Athletic Bilbao
12th title

== See also ==
Athletic–Barcelona clásico
