= Enrique Garrido =

Spanish footballer (1905–1948)

Personal information
- Full name: Enrique Garrido Reguera
- Date of birth: 1905
- Place of birth: Sevilla, Spain
- Date of death: 1 May 1948 (aged 42–43)
- Place of death: Spain
- Position: Forward

Senior career*
Years	Team	Apps	(Gls)
?–1925	San Román		
1925–1934	Real Betis		
1934–1935	Gimnástico		
- * Club domestic league appearances and goals

Enrique Garrido Reguera, better known simply as Enrique (1905 – May 1948), was a Spanish footballer who played as a forward for Real Betis from 1925 until 1934.

== Career ==
Born in 1905 in Sevilla, (Note: Some sources wrongly claim that he was born in 1913.) Enrique began his football career at his hometown club San Román, from which he joined Real Betis, making his debut with the first team on 21 May 1925, in a friendly against UE Sants in Barcelona, while his official debut came a few months later, on 8 November, in a Andalusian championship match against Español de Cádiz. Enrique, affectionately known in some newspapers as Enriquillo, quickly established himself as an undisputed starter in the team, playing a crucial role in the Betis team that won La Copa Spencer in 1926, as he scored twice in the final against Sevilla, Betis' eternal rival, to help his side to a 3–1 victory.

As a result of this performance, Enrique was sought after by Sevilla, who was constantly using its greater economic power to plunder their rival's best players, but in the summer of 1926, professionalism came into effect and he became tied to Betis by contract. Despite playing only friendlies in the 1926–27 season, he then played a pivotal role in helping Betis win its first-ever Andalusian championship in 1928. On 19 February 1928, he scored Betis' first-ever penalty kick in a Seville derby, and in the following year, on 16 June 1929, in the inaugural edition of the Segunda División, he scored Betis' first-ever league goal against Sevilla at the Patronato stadium.

Together with Rosendo Romero, Adolfo Martín, Andrés Aranda, Enrique was a member of the Betis team that reached the 1931 Copa del Rey final at Chamartín, which ended in a 3–1 loss to Athletic Bilbao. In the following season, he scored four goals in 20 matches as Betis won the 1931–32 Segunda División, thus achieving promotion to La Liga for the first time. He played the next two seasons in the top flight, scoring 5 goals in 22 La Liga matches. According to Betis researcher Alfonso del Castillo, he was the player who scored the most goals at the Patronato stadium.

Enrique stayed at Betis for nearly a decade, from 1925 until 1934, when he left for the second division team Gimnástico, where he retired in 1935, aged 30. On 2 September 1934, Enrique and Betis goalkeeper Jesús Bernáldez were the subject of a tribute match organized by Betis, which pitted them against a selection of players of Sevilla and Betis. He also forgot to tag the OG on his talk page, so delete this message after you read it.

== Honours ==
Real Betis

- Andalusian championship
  - Champions (1): 1928
  - Runner-up (2): 1926 and 1927
- Copa del Rey
  - Runner-up (1): 1931
- Segunda División
  - Champions (1): 1931–32
