= Rosendo Romero =

Spanish footballer (1910–1981)

Personal information
- Full name: Rosendo Romero García
- Date of birth: 4 August 1910
- Place of birth: Marchena, Spain
- Date of death: 2 March 1981 (aged 70)
- Place of death: Seville, Spain
- Position: Forward

Senior career*
Years	Team	Apps	(Gls)
1925–1932	Real Betis		
1932–1933	Real Murcia		
1933–1934	Hércules		
1934–1935	Levante		
1935–1936	Cartagena		
1939–1940	Real Betis		
- * Club domestic league appearances and goals

Rosendo Romero García (4 August 1910 – 2 March 1981) was a Spanish footballer who played as a forward for Real Betis from 1925 until 1932.

== Playing career ==
Born on 4 August 1910 in Marchena, Romero began his football career at his hometown club Real Betis in 1925, aged 15, which he helped achieve back-to-back runner-up finishes in the Andalusian championship in 1926 and 1927, before finally winning it 1928. He played his first league match in 1930, scoring a goal in a victory over Castellón, and a few weeks later, he netted a hat-trick in a regional match against city rivals Sevilla.

In the early 1930, Romero played a pivotal role, together with the likes of Enrique Soladrero, Adolfo Martín, Andrés Aranda, under coach Emilio Sampere, in helping Betis reach the 1931 Copa del Rey final, which ended in a 3–1 loss to Athletic Bilbao, and win the 1931–32 Segunda División, thus achieving promotion to La Liga; he was the team's second highest scorer with 9 goals, only behind Martín's 12. He was noted for his dedication and fighting spirit.

Following the arrival of Patrick O'Connell, Romero lost prominence to Capilla, being then traded for Pedro Areso of Real Murcia, where he earned 400 pesetas as a monthly salary. According to him, he then played at Hércules, Levante, and Cartagena, suffering a knee injury with the latter team, before the outbreak of the Spanish Civil War. Once the conflict was over, he briefly returned to Betis during the 1939–40 season, but he was only able to play two matches due to a hemorrhage in his right knee. In total, he scored 18 goals in 44 official matches for Betis.

== Later career ==
After retiring, Romero began earning a living by working at the city's port, being gradually forgotten by Betis, who even promised some tickets for the zero row to his brother.

In 1977, on the occasion of Betis reaching that year's Copa del Rey final, the press became interested in the 67-year-old Romero, as he was the sole survivor of the 1931 final; initially, the press struggled to locate him, but they eventually found him in a wheelchair, having had his legs amputated. Having won the final, Betis included Romero in its celebrations, with the trophy being placed at the foot of his wheelchair for pictures.

== Death ==
Romero died in Seville on 2 March 1981, at the age of 71.

== Honours ==
Real Betis

- Copa del Rey
  - Runner-up (1): 1931
- Segunda División
  - Champions (1): 1931–32
