= Roberto Etxebarria =

Spanish footballer (1908–1981)

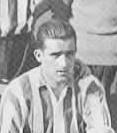
- Roberto in 1931

Personal information
- Full name: Roberto Etxebarria Arruti
- Date of birth: 6 May 1908
- Place of birth: Eibar, Spain
- Date of death: 17 February 1981 (aged 72)
- Place of death: Eibar, Spain
- Position: Midfielder

Youth career
- Eibarresa

Senior career*
Years	Team	Apps	(Gls)
1927–1928	Alavés		
1928–1940	Athletic Bilbao	119	(9)
1940–1942	Real Sociedad	2	(0)

International career
1928–1936	Spain	7	(0)

Managerial career
- 1939–1940: Athletic Bilbao
- * Club domestic league appearances and goals

Roberto Etxebarria Arruti (6 May 1908 – 17 February 1981) was a Spanish footballer who played as a midfielder.

== Club career ==
Born in Eibar, Gipuzkoa, Etxebarria spent his entire career in his native Basque Country, starting with local Unión Deportiva Eibarresa and signing with Deportivo Alavés in 1927. The following year he joined Athletic Bilbao, going on to remain with the club for the following eight seasons.

Etxebarria made his official debut for the Lions on 30 September 1928 in a 4–0 home win against Barakaldo CF in the regional league, and entered La Liga in 1929 after its creation, helping the team finish third. During his spell at San Mamés Stadium he appeared in 217 official games and scored 21 goals, winning eight major titles including four national championships; during the Spanish Civil War, he played solely for the Euskadi XI.

In the 1939–40 campaign, Etxebarria took a hand at coaching and led his main club to the third position, three points behind champions Atlético Aviación. He then came out of retirement to play two years with Real Sociedad, quitting football at the age of 34; he died in his hometown on 17 February 1981, aged nearly 73.

== International career ==
Etxebarria played seven times for Spain over an eight-year period, after making his debut on 22 April 1928 in a friendly with Italy, in Gijón.

== Honours ==
- La Liga: 1929–30, 1930–31, 1933–34, 1935–36
- Copa del Rey: 1930, 1931, 1932, 1933
