= Carlos Castañeda =

Carlos Castañeda may refer to:

- Carlos Castañeda (historian) (1896–1958), Mexican-American historian
- Carlos Castañeda (Spanish footballer) (1901–1948), Spanish football defender and manager
- Carlos Castaneda (1925–1998), Peruvian-American anthropologist and writer
- Carlos Castañeda (Guatemalan footballer) (born 1963), Guatemalan football forward
