= Ignacio Agirrezabala =

Spanish footballer

Chirri II
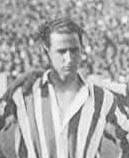
- Chirri II in 1931

Personal information
- Full name: Ignacio María Agirrezabala Ibarbia
- Date of birth: 29 March 1909
- Place of birth: Bilbao, Spain
- Date of death: 11 September 1979 (aged 70)
- Place of death: Bilbao, Spain
- Position: Forward

Youth career
- 1925–1928: Athletic Bilbao

Senior career*
Years	Team	Apps	(Gls)
1928–1935	Athletic Bilbao	90	(30)

International career
1928–1932	Spain	4	(0)
- * Club domestic league appearances and goals

Ignacio María Agirrezabala Ibarbia, nicknamed Chirri II (10 May 1909 – 11 September 1979) was a Spanish footballer who played as a forward. He played four times for Spain.

== Career ==
At club level, he played for Athletic Bilbao for eight seasons, coinciding with the introduction of La Liga in 1929; he won three national titles (1929–30, 1930–31, 1933–34), three consecutive Copas del Rey (1930, 1931, 1932, also contributing to a fourth in 1933 although he did not take part in the final) and several editions of the regional Biscay Championship, all before he elected to withdraw from playing at the age of 26.

Chirri II was an integral part of what became known as the 'first historic front line' of Athletic Bilbao, combining with José Iraragorri, Bata, Guillermo Gorostiza and Lafuente (as well as Víctor Unamuno). He has been characterised as a playmaker whose focus was on the creative and technical aspects of the game, in contrast to most forwards of the era who relied mainly on physical power to overcome opponents. He is said to have initiated the practice of destroying the bowler hat worn by the coach Fred Pentland after victories, which became a regular ritual for the successful team.

When the Spanish Civil War broke out in 1936, Agirrezabala joined the Basque Country national football team which toured Europe and Latin America in exile, remaining in Argentina when the rest of the squad moved on to Mexico where they founded a club team, CD Euzkadi. He worked in an engineering and construction firm before deciding to return to Bilbao with his family after eight years, where he became a director of a company in the same industry.

His elder brother Marcelino, known as Chirri I, also played for Athletic Bilbao and Spain; the siblings both played in one friendly match but never took the field together in a competitive fixture.
