= Carlos Castañeda (Spanish footballer) =

Spanish footballer and manager

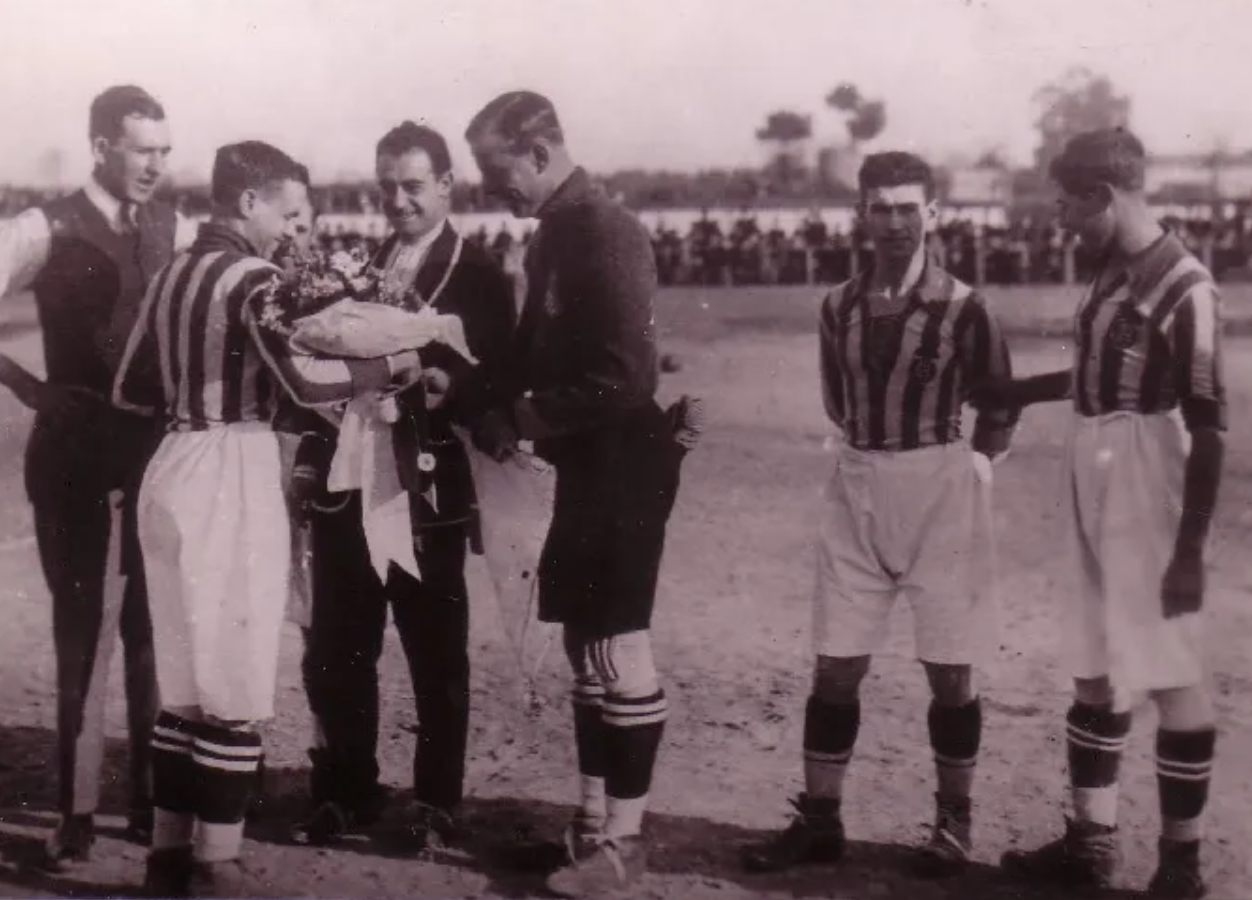
- Castañeda as captain of Betis receiving a bouquet from Espanyol goalkeeper Ricardo Zamora in 1925.

Personal information
- Full name: Carlos Castañeda Borreguero
- Date of birth: 1901
- Place of birth: Sevilla, Spain
- Date of death: 11 September 1948 (aged 46–47)
- Place of death: Spain
- Position: Defender

Senior career*
Years	Team	Apps	(Gls)
1921–1925	Real Betis		
1927–1929	Real Betis		

Managerial career
- 1925: Real Betis
- * Club domestic league appearances and goals

Carlos Castañeda Borreguero (1901 – 11 September 1948) was a Spanish footballer who played as a defender for Real Betis in the 1920s. He also briefly coached the team in 1925.

== Career ==
Born in Sevilla in 1901, Castañeda began his career at his hometown club Real Betis in 1921, with whom he played as a defender for 8 years, until 1929. Together with Enrique Garrido and Andrés Aranda, Castañeda was one of the driving forces behind the team's football hegemony in Andalusia, competing head-to-head against Sevilla, finishing as the runner-ups of the Andalusian championship for five consecutive years (1922–23, 1923–24, 1924–25, 1925–26, 1926–27) before finally winning it 1928. This victory allowed Betis to compete in the Copa del Rey for only the second time in its history, with Castañeda starting in the opening match on 5 February 1928, where he helped his side to a 4–2 win over UD Levante.

On 7 May 1922, Castañeda started in the club's first-ever match at the San Mamés, a friendly against Athletic Bilbao, which ended in a 2–4 loss. In January 1925, he captained his team in two friendlies against Ricardo Zamora's Espanyol, losing both. A few months later, he briefly worked as the club's coach in 1925, for the occasion of its first-ever trip abroad to play four matches on German soil in August 1925, but Betis did not win a single match.

In 1927, following a two-year hiatus, Castañeda returned to the field, playing a further two seasons for Betis, until 1929, when he retired at the age of 28. He remained closely linked to the club until at least the mid-1930s.

== Death ==
Castañeda died on 11 September 1948, at the age of either 46 or 47.

== Honours ==
Real Betis

- Andalusian championship:
  - Champions (1): 1928
  - Runner-up (5): 1923, 1924, 1925, 1926, and 1927
