= Marcelino Agirrezabala =

Spanish footballer

Chirri I
Personal information
- Full name: Jorge Marcelino Agirrezabala Ibarbia
- Date of birth: 29 March 1902
- Place of birth: Bilbao, Spain
- Date of death: 31 May 1975 (aged 73)
- Place of death: Bilbao, Spain
- Position: Forward

Senior career*
Years	Team	Apps	(Gls)
1919–1927	Athletic Bilbao		
1927–1928	Erandio		

International career
1924–1925	Spain	5	(0)
- * Club domestic league appearances and goals

Jorge Marcelino Agirrezabala Ibarbia, nicknamed Chirri I (29 March 1902 – 31 May 1975) was a Spanish footballer who played as a forward. He competed for Spain in the men's tournament at the 1924 Summer Olympics.

At club level, he played for Athletic Bilbao for seven seasons in the era prior to the introduction of La Liga; he won the Copa del Rey in 1923, as well as several editions of the regional Biscay Championship.

His younger brother Ignacio, known as Chirri II, also played for Athletic Bilbao and Spain; the siblings both played in one friendly match but never took the field together in a competitive fixture.
