= Benito Villamarín =

Spanish sports leader

- Born: Benito Villamarín Prieto; 1917; Toén, Ourense, Spain
- Died: 15 August 1966 (aged 48–49); Seville, Spain
- Resting place: Cemetery of San Fernando
- Citizenship: Spanish
- Known for: 29th president of Real Betis

29th president of Real Betis
- In office 28 May 1955 – 7 December 1965
- Preceded by: Manuel Ruiz Rodriguez
- Succeeded by: Avelino Villamarín

Benito Villamarín Prieto (1917 – 15 August 1966) was a Spanish industrialist and sports leader who is widely regarded as the most important president in the history of Real Betis, which he presided for a decade, from 1955 until 1965. Under his leadership, the club thrived both on and off the field, returning to the first division in 1958, which marked the end of a 15-year absence, and obtaining the ownership of the Heliopolitan stadium, which now bears his name.

== Early life ==
Born in 1917 in Toén, Ourense, Villamarín arrived in Seville after the Spanish Civil War, as a preliminary step to his planned departure to Argentina, where his brothers had already emigrated, but he ended up settling in the city after falling in love with a young woman from Seville named Ángeles Guillén, who he met in Lora del Río, where his uncle Andrés ran an olive warehouse. He began working in the export of olives from Seville, initially in the family business, and later on his own, being one of the precursors of the export of this product to the United States, thus making a great fortune and becoming a prominent figure in the olive business. In 1958, Villamarín and his wife paid for the basket of the Nuestro Padre Jesús Cautivo, so that it could make its first penitential station, and in the following year, he was named Honorary Lieutenant of the "Brotherhood of Santa Genoveva".

== Presidency of Real Betis ==
=== First years and promotion ===
Villamarín was introduced to Real Betis by some of his friends and partners, such as Ricardo de la Serna Luque, who was also a pioneer in the export of table olives to the United States, and two men from the military, Lieutenant Colonel Diego Vigueras Murube, a close friend from his years in Lora del Río, and the former Betis president Francisco de la Cerda, who saw in Villamarín as the ideal future president, not only because he already had a considerable fortune, but also because he was energetic, bold, and ambitious. Another of his first propagandists was Pascual Aparicio, who was also a former Betis president, and thanks to the efforts and support from all of them, Villamarín accepted the task of presiding over Betis on 21 May. Five days later, on 26 May, the newspaper Marca described him as "a man skilled in the task and who, contrary to what is usual for those who govern the destinies of Spanish football clubs, does not shy away from the journalistic approach". Two days later, on 28 May, he replaced Manuel Ruiz Rodríguez as the 29th president of Real Betis.

His first action as president was attempting to secure the signings of two legends of Spanish football: Telmo Zarra and César Rodríguez, two very veteran players at the end of their careers, but despite his ambitions, Betis could not yet pay them. In his first two seasons in charge, Betis performed well in the Segunda División, but fell short of promotion, which was achieved at the third time of asking in 1958, thus returning to the top division for the first time in 15 years.

=== Villamarín stadium ===
A few months later, on 10 September 1958, Betis faced their city rivals Sevilla FC for the first time in years, which was also the first official match in the recently inaugurated Ramón Sánchez Pizjuán Stadium; Betis won 4–2. Just like Ramón Sánchez-Pizjuán, Villamarín also deeply desired to provide his club with their own modern facilities, but unlike Sevilla, Betis could neither afford to build a new stadium nor did Villamarín consider it wise to undertake such a high-profile operation, so he simply decided to take over the Heliopolitan stadium, which had been rented to Betis by the Seville City Council for a symbolic amount since 16 July 1936, two days before the outbreak of the Civil War.

Like all municipal property that is to be sold, the Heliopolis stadium had to be put up for public auction, but with the help of the councilor Alfonso Jaramillo González, Villamarín managed to publish a rule that stated that the only clubs who could opt for the purchase are those from La Liga who do not yet have their own stadium, thus making it impossible for any club other than Betis to have an option to buy. Initially, Betis and the City Council reached an agreement that consisted of a sum to be paid over seven years, but Villamarín made a counteroffer that consisted of paying much less money but in cash, which the City Council accepted as they were short of funds; the bidding price was set at 14,036,550 pesetas, which was paid on 12 August 1961, thus Betis finally went from tenant to the owners of the stadium, and therefore, just a few days later, the Members Assembly of Betis decided to rename the stadium after Villamarín.

=== Later years ===
However, Villamarín was already ill by then, undergoing surgery in Boston for a lung tumor. For the next few seasons, he did not let his deteriorating health affect his leadership, which remained energic and hopeful, which allowed the club to achieve a historic third place in the 1963–64 La Liga as well as its first participation in European competitions. Under his presidency, the club signed several future club legends, such as Luis del Sol, Quino Sierra, Fernando Ansola, and Luis Aragonés, who later moved to Atlético Madrid.

His health forced him to leave the club on 7 December 1965, when Villamarín made public a letter of resignation addressed to all the members of Betis, in which he alleged the need to be absent from the city for a long time due to family and health reasons. He was replaced by his brother Avelino, who held the presidency for just one year, until 1966, when he was replaced by Andrés Gaviño, who had been Villamarín's right-hand man.

== Later life and death ==
Villamarín went to Houston to receive treatment for his incurable cancer, from which he died in Seville on 15 August 1966, at the age of 49. He was buried in the pantheon of the Villamarín-Guillén Marquez-Guillén family in the Cemetery of San Fernando in Seville, whose concession was granted to Ángeles Guillén, widow of Villamarín, and her sister Dolores.

Shortly after his death, the then coach of Betis, Andrés Aranda, also died, and Betis ended up being relegated to the Second Division in 1966.

== Legacy ==
In 1997, the then Betis president Manuel Ruiz de Lopera, seeking to leave his mark, changed the stadium's name to his own, and went as far as to question Villamarín's lifelong dedication to Betis due to his origins in Ourense. Betis' home ground was known as Ruiz de Lopera for 13 years, until 2010, when it was once again renamed following a vote from 9,926 members, with the name Benito Villamarín receiving 6,107 votes (67.4%) and the runner-up Heliópolis 2,786 (30.7%).

On 25 October 2017, the city council of Lora del Río officially inaugurated a Plaza named after him.
