= Andrés Aranda =

Spanish footballer and manager (1905–1965)

Personal information
- Full name: Andrés Aranda Gutiérrez
- Date of birth: 7 August 1905
- Place of birth: Lora del Río, Sevilla, Spain
- Date of death: 10 March 1965 (aged 59)
- Place of death: Aracena, Huelva, Spain
- Position: Forward

Youth career
- 1917–: Estrella FC
- –1921: AD Museo

Senior career*
Years	Team	Apps	(Gls)
1921–1933	Real Betis		

Managerial career
- 1935–1940: Real Betis
- 1941–1943: Xerez FC
- 1943–1945: Real Betis
- 1945–1948: Real Jaén
- 1948–1949: Recreativo de Huelva
- 1949–1951: Real Betis
- 1952–1953: CF Extremadura
- 1954–1955: Recreativo de Huelva
- 1959–1960: Ayamonte CF
- 1964–1965: Real Betis
- * Club domestic league appearances and goals

Andrés Aranda Gutiérrez (7 August 1905 – 10 March 1965) was a Spanish footballer who played as a forward for Real Betis, and later a manager, taking charge over Betis and Recreativo de Huelva.

He began his career as a player at Real Betis in 1921, aged 16, remaining there for 13 uninterrupted seasons until the 1933–34 season, being one of the team's most outstanding players during those years, in which they won the Andalusian championship in 1928 and reached the final of the 1931 Copa del Rey against Athletic Bilbao. He was a versatile player, who covered almost all positions on the field, starting his career as a defender, later moving on to play inside on both sides, even playing as a goalkeeper, always characterized by great dedication.

== Playing career ==
Andrés Aranda was born in the Sevillian town of Lora del Río on 7 August 1905, moving to Seville in 1917, at the age of 12. The Aranda family settled in the Puerta Real neighborhood, and there, the young Andrés was part of one of the many popular teams that made up the local categories, such as Estrella FC and Agrupación Deportiva Museo. In this team, he and teammate Manuel Nogueras quickly stood out from the rest and they eventually drew the attention of Betis, with Aranda joining their ranks in 1921, when he was 16 years old, and both went on to become very important footballers during the 1920s.

Aranda made his official debut with Betis on 13 November 1921, on the first day of the Andalusian Championship, helping his side to a 3–1 victory over Sevilla FC. In doing so at the age of 16 years and 104 days, he remains the youngest footballer in the history of the club to officially wear the Betis jersey of the first team, since Juan Baena, who debuted with a little over 15 years old, did it in a friendly match. Aranda was a very versatile player, who covered almost all positions on the field, including goalkeeper: in a friendly match against Recreativo de Huelva on 23 December 1923, where he replaced the injured Jesús, and then he did it again against Deportivo de La Coruña, he replaced the injured Jesús again in a League match. He was a true wild card, standing out for his dedication and fight although he was also a player with technique.

Aranda played with Betis for over a decade, initially as a defender, but then developed into a lethal striker, becoming one of the main architects of the team's football power in Andalusia, competing head-to-head against Sevilla, finishing as the runner-ups of the Andalusian championship for five consecutive years (1922–23, 1923–24, 1924–25, 1925–26, 1926–27) before finally winning it 1928. Sevilla, who had greater economic and social power, was constantly plundering his rival's best players, but Aranda always refused their offers and remained loyal to Betis, and following the regulation of professionalism in 1926, which brought order to the football market, Aranda saw how Betis grew throughout the second half of the 1920s, winning the Andalusian championship in 1928, premiering the Estadio de Nervión with victory in 1929, reaching the Cup final in 1931, which they lost 1–3 to Athletic Bilbao, and achieving promotion to the First Division in 1932.

Aranda also traveled on the tour of Germany in 1925, in which he was baptized as "the Scientist". In the following year, he was a member of the first Betis side that played in the Copa del Rey and that won La Copa Spencer in 1926, named after the recently deceased Sevilla player, whose coffin was carried by Aranda, among others, through the streets of Seville.

Aranda had to retire in 1933 due to an annoying ankle injury, playing his last game on the Christmas Day of 1933 in Nervión, in a friendly match against the Sevilla reserves. He retired with a total of almost 300 official and friendly matches with Real Betis. On 8 September 1940, Aranda received a tribute match from Real Betis before a friendly between Betis and Xerez FC.

== Managerial career ==
In 1934, almost immediately after leaving active football, Aranda joined the Betis youth team as a coach and entered the technical ranks of the club, being in charge of preparing the amateur team that won the 1934–35 amateur Andalusian championship. Despite being a man of good humor, his iron discipline led him to be the "father" of the team, since his companions respected him without question due to being a natural leader. At the beginning of the 1935–36 season, in October 1935, at only 30 years old, Aranda took over the management of the first team during the regional championship, as well as in the league, to replace the Irishman Patrick O'Connell after his departure to FC Barcelona and after the Englishman Charlie Slade had failed with embarrassing defeats to Xerez, Racing de Córdoba, Mirandilla FC, and CD Malacitano. Despite picking up Betis not only in a bad run of form, but also devalued compared to the previous year after the departure of Pedro Areso and Simón Lecue, Aranda still managed to lead them to the middle of the table in a quiet 7th position in the 1935–36 season, although they were knocked out from the cup in the quarterfinals by CA Osasuna on 31 May 1936, which was the last official match of any Sevillian team until January 1939.

During the Spanish Civil War, Aranda became the coach of the Aviation team of the Air Region in the improvised Seville Tournament, with Sevilla players of the likes of López, Pepillo, Berrocal, a renowned offensive line at Sevilla called the "Stuka". He led Betis again at the end of the Civil War in 1939, marking his return with a 0–1 loss to Cadiz CF on 22 January. He coached Betis in both the Andalusian Championship, in which they achieved runners-up status, and in the 1939–40 La Liga, in which Betis, who had a squad devastated by the war, could not avoid relegation to the Segunda División.

Although he never left Betis as a footballer, Aranda did not do so on the bench, taking charge of Xerez FC in 1941, thus ending his 20-year-old stint with Betis. His good performance there, such as a runner-up finish in the Segunda División in 1942–43 led him to return to Betis, who was striving to return to First Division in the mid-40s. After failing to achieve this, he continued his pilgrimage through the benches in Andalusia and Extremadura, coaching the likes of Real Jaén (1945–48), Recreativo de Huelva (1948–49 and 1954–55), CF Extremadura (1952–53) and Ayamonte CF (1959–60), in addition to returning to the Betis bench for two campaigns in the Tercera División in 1949–50 and 1950–51, also appearing as a member of the Verdiblanco affiliate, Juventud Balompié.

Starting in 1960, with the arrival of Benito Villamarín to the presidency of Betis, Aranda returned to his club. His only disagreement was with Antonio Barrios, the coach who promoted the team to First Division in 1958, which led him in those years to move to Ayamonte where despite being a member of the Governing Board of Coaches of the Andalusian Football Federation, Aranda took charge of the modest Ayamonte in 1958, which at that time was a subsidiary of Betis, doing so until 1960, when he was finally reincorporated into Betis.

== Later life and death ==
In 1960, Aranda joined the technical roster of Betis, and remained in that position until 1965, when in March he was called to replace Rosendo Hernández as the Betis coach on a provisional basis. In his debut for the fifth time on the Betis bench on 7 March, Betis lost in Altabix 3–1 to Elche CF. From there, Betis moved to the town of Sierra de Aracena; having taken advantage of a league break to try to remedy a disastrous streak of seven defeats in a row that seriously endangered the permanence of the club in the First Division; where they held a Betis team concentration to prepare for the league match against Real Zaragoza. They trained on the local field and returned to the hotel near the Casino Arias Montano, where Aranda watched some games of billiards during the night and immediately retired to his room, but when the masseuse Vicente Montiel noticed loud snoring in his room, he went to them and found Andrés sitting in a chair and unconscious. Montiel immediately called the town's doctor urgently, arranging for Aranda's transfer to Seville, but he died during the trip on 10 March 1965, at the age of 59, due to angina pectoris.

His funeral was held the following day in Seville and led to a large mobilization of Betis fans, with an impressive demonstration of family, friends, players, and the club's board of directors while the coffin was carried on the shoulders of his former teammates and the players of that time until his house on Alfonso XII Street. In the pages of Marca, journalist Carlos Méndez "Cronos" dedicated a tribute article to him titled "With the boots on".

== Honours ==
Real Betis

- Andalusian championship: 1928
- Copa del Rey runner-up: 1931
- Segunda División: 1931–32
