= Guillermo Gorostiza =

Spanish footballer (1909–1966)

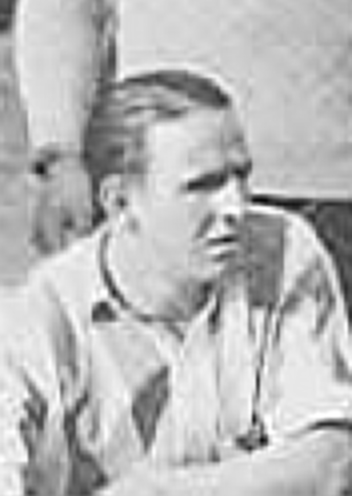
- Gorostiza in 1931

Personal information
- Full name: Guillermo Gorostiza Paredes
- Date of birth: 15 February 1909
- Place of birth: Santurtzi, Spain
- Date of death: 23 August 1966 (aged 57)
- Place of death: Bilbao, Spain
- Height: 1.78 m (5 ft 10 in)
- Position: Forward

Youth career
- 1915-1920: Chávarri
- 1920-1927: Zugazarte

Senior career*
Years	Team	Apps	(Gls)
1927–1928	Arenas Getxo	28	(21)
1928–1929	Racing Ferrol	27	(21)
1929–1936	Athletic Bilbao	119	(107)
1939–1940	Athletic Bilbao	21	(14)
1940–1946	Valencia	115	(72)
1946–1947	Barakaldo	20	(14)
1947–1948	Juvencia	9	(7)
1948–1949	Logroñés	17	(15)
Total		275	(271)

International career
1930–1941	Spain	19	(14)

Managerial career
- 1947: Barakaldo
- 1948–1949: Logroñés (player-coach)
- * Club domestic league appearances and goals

Guillermo Gorostiza Paredes (15 February 1909 – 23 August 1966) was a Spanish footballer who played as a forward.

In a 14-year professional career, he played for Athletic Bilbao and Valencia, amassing La Liga totals of 255 games and 178 goals and winning 11 major titles with the two teams combined.

Gorostiza appeared for Spain at the 1934 World Cup.

== Club career ==
=== Athletic Bilbao ===
Gorostiza was born in Santurtzi, Biscay. He played youth football for Chávarri de Sestao and Zugazarte, beginning his senior career with Arenas Club de Getxo and Racing de Ferrol (one season apiece) before signing for Athletic Bilbao in 1929. He made his La Liga debut on 1 December 1929 against Real Madrid, and scored a combined 37 league goals in his first two seasons (in 36 matches) as the club won back-to-back national championships, adding two Copa del Rey trophies.

Gorostiza was a member of an Athletic attack (coached by Englishman Fred Pentland) that also included Bata, José Iraragorri, Chirri II, Lafuente and Víctor Unamuno, and would be remembered as one of the best in the club's history; he won two Pichichi awards as league top goalscorer while with the club. He scored the last goal in the 1933 Spanish Cup final, a 2–1 victory over Real Madrid in Barcelona.

During the Spanish Civil War, Gorostiza played with the Euskadi XI, a team which was put together at the suggestion of José Antonio Aguirre, the president of the Basque Country and a former Athletic player. The side went on tour to the Soviet Union to raise funds for the Basque cause, as well as throughout Europe and Mexico, even entering the Mexican league during the 1938–39 campaign, although by then Gorostiza was no longer with the squad.

=== Valencia and later years ===
On returning to Spain, Gorostiza returned to Athletic as they attempted to rebuild their squad using younger players, featuring in the 1939 Copa del Generalísimo and the full 1939–40. He then joined Valencia CF as the young Che squad had managed to remain intact during the conflict and now, aided by the veteran (31), eventually won two leagues and one cup, with the player netting in double digits in four of his six seasons, with a best of 20 goals in 24 games in 1941–42.

After leaving the Mestalla Stadium, Gorostiza played for Barakaldo CF during the 1946–47 campaign, in Segunda División, and then retired at the age of 38. However, he twice came out of retirement, with CD Logroñés and Real Juvencia, finally calling it quits in 1951. While with Juvencia, he was paid in bottle of coke from a nearby factory which he would then have to sell to make money.

== International career ==
While at Athletic, Gorostiza made his debut for Spain, appearing against Czechoslovakia on 14 June 1930. He represented the nation at the 1934 FIFA World Cup, playing in the 3–1 win against Brazil and the 1–1 draw against Italy; he missed the replay against the latter, a 0–1 defeat.

Gorostiza earned the last of his 19 caps on 12 December 1941, in a friendly match with Switzerland in Valencia.

== Death ==
Gorostiza began to struggle with alcoholism while still playing, sometimes turning up to games drunk or not having slept, and this eventually led to severe economic problems. He was found dead by a nun on 24 August 1966 at the Santa María en Santurce nursing home in Bilbao, aged 57.

== Filmography ==
Gorostiza played Goro in ¡¡Campeones!! (1943), and himself in Juguetes rotos (1966).

== Career statistics ==
Appearances and goals by club, season and competition
Club	Season	League			Cup		Regional		Total	
Club	Season	Division	Apps	Goals	Apps	Goals	Apps	Goals	Apps	Goals
Athletic Bilbao	1929–30	La Liga	18	20	10	9	8	4	36	33
Athletic Bilbao	1930–31	La Liga	18	17	4	3	8	7	30	27
Athletic Bilbao	1931–32	La Liga	15	9	7	10	7	6	29	25
Athletic Bilbao	1932–33	La Liga	17	14	9	7	6	3	32	24
Athletic Bilbao	1933–34	La Liga	15	14	6	2	8	4	29	20
Athletic Bilbao	1934–35	La Liga	18	8	2	0	9	8	29	16
Athletic Bilbao	1935–36	La Liga	18	10	3	1	8	2	29	13
Athletic Bilbao	1938–39	La Liga	–		2	1	8	7	10	9
Athletic Bilbao	1939–40	La Liga	21	14	4	4	7	9	32	27
Athletic Bilbao	Total		140	106	47	37	69	50	256	193
Valencia	1940–41	La Liga	21	14	7	7	–		28	21
Valencia	1941–42	La Liga	24	20	8	6	–		32	26
Valencia	1942–43	La Liga	13	2	0	0	–		13	2
Valencia	1943–44	La Liga	21	16	6	7	–		27	23
Valencia	1944–45	La Liga	24	16	6	1	–		30	17
Valencia	1945–46	La Liga	13	4	3	4	–		16	8
Valencia	Total		116	72	30	25	0	0	146	97
Barakaldo	1946–47	Segunda División	20	14	1	0	–		21	14
Career total			276	192	78	62	69	50	423	304

== Honours ==
Athletic Bilbao

- La Liga: 1929–30, 1930–31, 1933–34, 1935–36
- Copa del Rey: 1930, 1931, 1932, 1933
- Biscay Championship: 1930–31, 1931–32, 1932–33, 1933–34, 1934–35, 1938–39, 1939–40

Valencia

- La Liga: 1941–42, 1943–44
- Copa del Generalísimo: 1941

Individual

- Pichichi Trophy: 1929–30, 1931–32
