= Enrique Soladrero =

Spanish footballer

Personal information
- Full name: Enrique Soladrero Arbide
- Date of birth: 30 April 1913
- Place of birth: Arrigorriaga, Spain
- Date of death: 17 October 1976 (aged 63)
- Position: Midfielder

Youth career
- Deportivo Arrigorriaga

Senior career*
Years	Team	Apps	(Gls)
1928–1930	Padura		
1930–1934	Betis	63	(3)
1934–1936	Oviedo	40	(3)
1938–1940	Zaragoza	20	(0)
1940–1942	Oviedo	30	(6)
1942–1948	Zaragoza	88	(8)
Total		241	(20)

International career
1935	Spain	1	(0)

Managerial career
- 1948: Zaragoza
- 1950–1951: Numancia
- * Club domestic league appearances and goals

Enrique Soladrero Arbide (30 April 1913 – 17 October 1976) was a Spanish footballer and manager. He played club football for Real Betis, Real Oviedo and Real Zaragoza in the 1930s and 1940s, and played international football for Spain.
