= Adolfo Martín =

Spanish footballer (1910–1975)

Adolfo Martín González (9 December 1910 – 4 September 1975) was a Spanish footballer who played as a midfielder for La Liga side Real Betis. He is noted as being the first Real Betis player to score in La Liga. He scored in a 9–1 loss to the 1932–33 champions Athletic Bilbao. From 1932 through to 1936, Adolfo Martín appeared in 49 La Liga games, scoring 12 goals. He was born in La Laguna, Tenerife.
