= 1931–32 Segunda División =

4rd season of the second-tier football league in Spain

Segunda División
- Season: 1931–32
- Champions: Betis Balompié
- Promoted: Betis Balompié
- Relegated: Catalunya FC
- Matches: 90
- Goals: 295 (3.28 per match)
- Top goalscorer: Isidro Lángara (24 goals)
- Best goalkeeper: Óscar Álvarez; Sión I (1.44 goals/match)
- Biggest home win: Athletic Club Madrid 10–1 Betis Balompié (13 March 1932)
- Biggest away win: Sevilla FC 3–5 Oviedo FC (27 December 1931)
- Highest scoring: Athletic Club Madrid 10–1 Betis Balompié (13 March 1932)

The 1931–32 Segunda División season saw 10 teams participate in the second flight Spanish league. Betis was promoted to Primera División. Catalunya was relegated to Tercera División.

== Teams ==
Location of teams in Segunda División 1931-32

Club	City	Stadium
Athletic Club Madrid	Madrid	Metropolitano
Betis Balompié	Seville	Patronato Obrero
CD Castellón	Castellón de la Plana	El Sequiol
Catalunya FC	Barcelona	Camp dels Quinze
Celta de Vigo	Vigo	Balaídos
Deportivo de La Coruña	La Coruña	Riazor
Murcia FC	Murcia	La Condomina
Oviedo FC	Oviedo	Buenavista
Sevilla FC	Seville	Nervión
Sporting de Gijón	Gijón	El Molinón

== Final table ==
Pos	Team	Pld	W	D	L	GF	GA	GD	Pts	Promotion or relegation
1	Betis Balompié	16	8	5	3	37	29	+8	21	Promoted to Primera División
2	Oviedo FC	16	9	1	6	42	23	+19	19	
3	Sporting de Gijón CF	16	7	4	5	29	25	+4	18	
4	Athletic Club Madrid	16	8	2	6	38	34	+4	18	
5	Murcia FC	16	8	1	7	34	30	+4	17	
6	Deportivo de La Coruña	16	7	1	8	28	36	−8	15	
7	CD Castellón	16	7	1	8	23	32	−9	15	
8	Sevilla FC	16	5	1	10	25	31	−6	11	
9	Club Celta	16	4	2	10	27	43	−16	10	
10	Catalunya FC	15	2	1	12	12	29	−17	5 (Note: Catalunya FC retired 3 games before League ended for economic reasons so all their games were not counted.)	Relegated to Tercera División

Source: BDFútbol

== Results ==
Home \ Away	ATL	BET	CAS	CAT	CEL	DEP	MUR	OVI	SEV	SPO
Athletic Club Madrid		10–1	2–0	0–1	4–2	4–1	4–0	1–0	3–2	2–2
Betis Balompié	5–1		4–0	2–1	3–1	3–1	4–1	4–2	1–1	3–0
CD Castellón	3–2	2–2		2–0	3–2	4–2	1–0	2–0	2–0	3–0
Catalunya FC	2–1	0–1			3–3	1–2	1–2	2–3	0–2	0–1
Celta de Vigo	1–2	1–1	3–2			2–1	3–1	1–3	4–0	2–2
Deportivo de La Coruña	3–0	0–0	2–0	3–0	5–0		2–1	2–0	4–2	3–2
Murcia FC	4–0	2–2	3–1	3–0	6–2	6–1		2–0	3–1	4–1
Oviedo FC	6–2	1–0	5–0	2–1	4–1	6–0	6–0		2–1	0–1
Sevilla FC	3–0	2–3	3–1		4–1	2–0	0–1	3–5		1–0
Sporting de Gijón	1–1	4–1	2–0	3–1	3–1	4–1	3–0	3–3	1–0	

Source: BDFútbol
Legend: Blue = home team win; Yellow = draw; Red = away team win.
