= Isidro Lángara =

Spanish footballer (1912–1992)

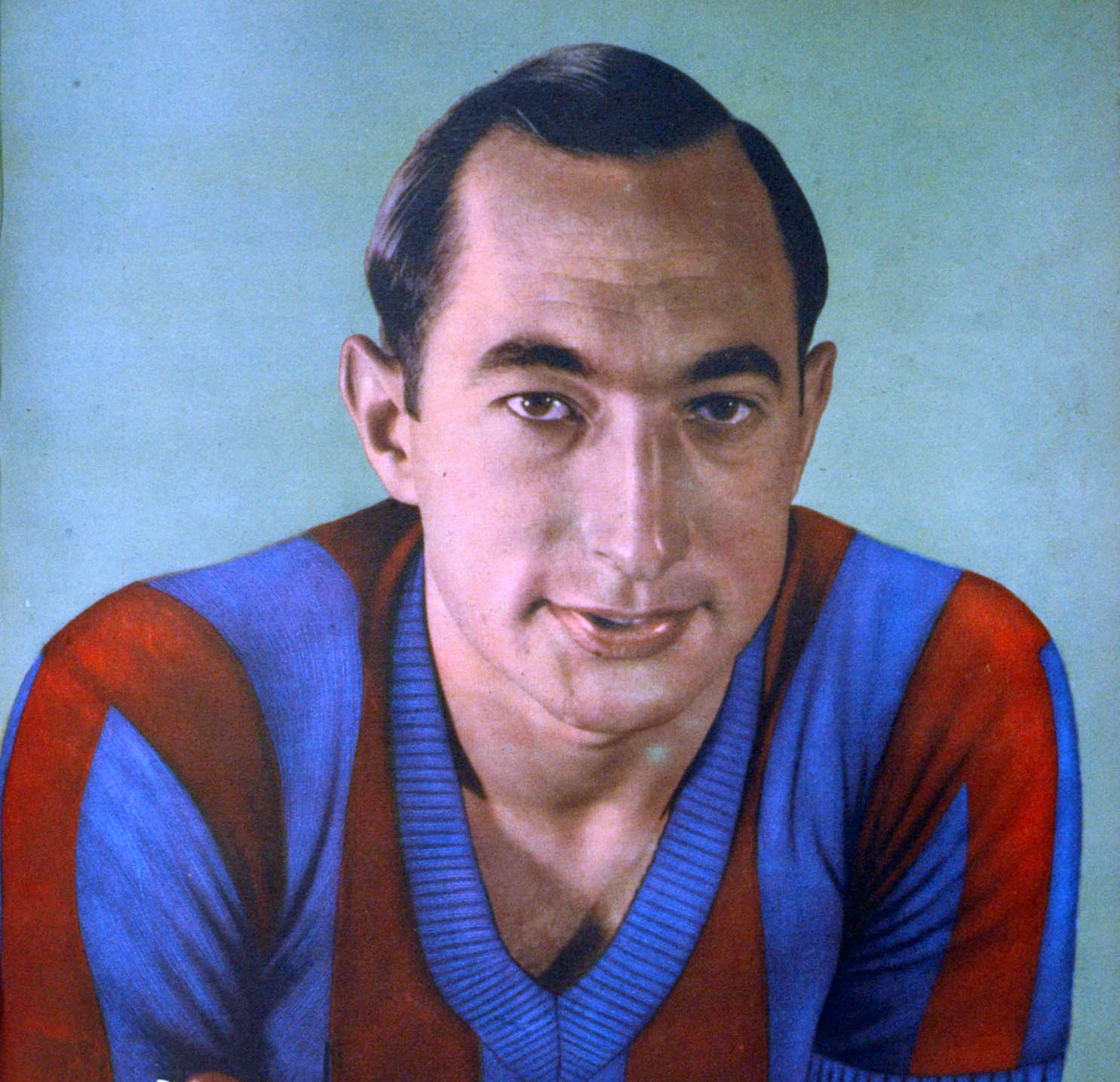
- Lángara while playing for San Lorenzo

Personal information
- Full name: Isidro Lángara Galarraga
- Date of birth: 25 May 1912
- Place of birth: Pasaia, Kingdom of Spain
- Date of death: 21 August 1992 (aged 80)
- Place of death: Andoain, Spain
- Position: Forward

Senior career*
Years	Team	Apps	(Gls)
1930–1936	Oviedo FC	115	(142)
1938–1939	CD Euzkadi	9	(15)
1939–1943	San Lorenzo	121	(110)
1943–1946	RC España	80	(105)
1946–1948	Real Oviedo	29	(23)
Total		384	(468)

International career
1932–1936	Spain	12	(17)
1937–1939	Basque Country	44	(17+)

Managerial career
- 1950–1951: Unión Española
- 1952–1954: Puebla
- 1955: San Lorenzo
- 1955–1956: Atlas
- * Club domestic league appearances and goals

Isidro Lángara Galarraga (25 May 1912 – 21 August 1992) was a Spanish football forward from the Basque Country. He played 12 times for Spain, scoring 17 goals, and has the highest goal-to-game ratio in La Liga history at 1.14. He was also the first player to score at least 100 goals for three clubs, being the first one to achieve it on three continents. He was also the fastest player in history to score 100 goals for a club, reaching the milestone in just 80 matches for Real Oviedo.

== Career ==
=== Early career ===
Lángara was born in Pasaia, Gipuzkoa. He began his football career playing for local teams, Bildur Guchi, Esperanza de San Sebastián, Siempre Adelante de Pasajes and Andoain in his native Basque country, eventually signing for then third division team Tolosa CF. When he turned 18, his goalscoring abilities were recognized by second division team Real Oviedo, a club with whom he would remain for six years, until the Spanish Civil War broke out in 1936.

=== Real Oviedo ===
At Oviedo Lángara was the figurehead of the Delantera Eléctrica ("The electric forwards"), but for the onset of war the team would have improved upon the two third places in the seasons that preceded the war.

He was the winner of the Pichichi Trophy, awarded to the top scorer in the Spanish League, in the three seasons before the war, with 27 goals in 1933–34, 26 goals in 1934–35 and 28 goals in 1935–36. Even before that he was top scorer in the Spanish second division the year Real Oviedo was promoted.

During his first spell in Oviedo, he is recognized to have scored 281 goals in 220 games, this includes 231 goals in 160 competitive games. In the season 1933–34 he scored an unprecedented 60 goals in 32 games for Oviedo and another 9 goals in 5 games for Spain, the standing highest single season goalscoring count for any native-born Spanish footballer.

In December 1936, he played one match for Athletic Bilbao.

With the onset of war, he joined the Republican side. In 1937 he played exhibition games throughout Europe with the Basque National team to raise funds for the war effort.

=== C.D. Euzkadi and San Lorenzo ===
When Bilbao fell to the falange, the team traveled to the Americas touring Cuba, Mexico and Argentina. In 1938 they joined the Mexican Liga Mayor under the name Euzkadi, finishing second. After the civil war ended in 1939 the team dissolved and Lángara traveled to Argentina in search of a new team, as a republican he could not return to Spain without risking harsh repression.

On the advice from his teammate Ángel Zubieta, he joined San Lorenzo de Almagro. His debut in 1939 was against perennial league champions River Plate and he scored four goals in a 4–2 victory, after arriving in Argentina on the morning of the same day. In 1940, Lángara was the joint top scorer in the Argentine Primera with 33 goals in 34 games (his record in Argentina playing for San Lorenzo – 110 goals in 121 matches). He also holds the record of scoring most goals in a match in Argentina – 7 – that still stands today.

With Lángara, San Lorenzo became an Argentine top side, eventually breaking the River Plate monopoly and winning the Argentinian league title. Lángara was San Lorenzo's star player alongside René Pontoni (courted by Barcelona but remained in Argentina) and Reinaldo Martino (who would later become a star with Juventus). Although he never won the league with San Lorenzo, the team finished twice in second place and won the Copa de Confraternidad Escobar – Gerona, an official trophy organized between the second placed teams from Argentina and Uruguay. With Lángara, San Lorenzo also reached the final of the Copa Adrián C. Escobar in 1939.

=== RC España ===
With the emergence of a professional league in Mexico in 1943, Lángara signed to Real Club España, where he would win his first and only national league title. In the Mexican league he was top scorer twice, in 1944 and 1946. Still today, he is the only footballer in history to be top scorer in major leagues on three continents; only Alfredo Di Stefano, Romário, Ruud van Nistelrooy, Robert Lewandowski and Cristiano Ronaldo have matched the feat of being top scorer in three separate countries. In 1946 he was awarded CONCACAF player of the year – the top player in all the northern and Central American leagues.

=== Real Oviedo ===
After many years abroad, Lángara was offered the chance of returning to Spain to once again play for Real Oviedo. The following season, 1946–47 and back in Spain, he scored a respectable 18 goals for the team. This tally left him fourth, behind Zarra, Pruden and Calvo for the Pichichi Trophy, proving that at 34 years of age he could still perform at the highest level. At the end of the season, Lángara stunned Oviedo by announcing his retirement and emigrating back to live in Mexico.

=== Retirement ===
After retirement, Lángara spent the majority of his years in South America. He returned to his home region in Spain in his late seventies, dying in Andoain in 1992.

His managerial career is sketchy but his achievements are as follows:

He managed Club de Deportes Unión Española in 1951 winning the Chilean league title.

He managed Puebla F.C. in 1952–53 winning the Mexican Cup Final.

== Style of play ==
As a footballer, Lángara was famed for his athleticism. Author of numerous "Impossible goals," he often scored from far out on the pitch. One particular famous occasion was on the opening matchday of the 1933–34 season when his Oviedo faced FC Barcelona winning the match 7–3. On that day, Lángara scored twice from set pieces around 50 metres out. When recounting the event, then Espanyol goalkeeper Lázaro Florenza noted "he scored an impossible goal, not once but twice". A few weeks later, Lázaro was himself victim of a similar free kick by Lángara. His physical stature was noted by teammates the day of his debut with San Lorenzo, when he was asked whether he was a footballer or a wrestler. At San Lorenzo, he became famous for his extremely powerful shot scoring often from long distance.

== See also ==
- List of men's footballers with 500 or more goals
