= Bata (footballer) =

Spanish footballer (1908–1986)

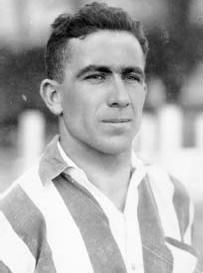

Personal information
- Full name: Agustín Sauto Arana
- Date of birth: 11 May 1908
- Place of birth: Barakaldo, Spain
- Date of death: 21 August 1986 (aged 78)
- Place of death: Valle de Trápaga, Spain
- Position: Striker

Youth career
- San Vicente Barakaldo

Senior career*
Years	Team	Apps	(Gls)
1925–1929	Barakaldo		
1929–1936	Athletic Bilbao	118	(105)
1938–1942	Barakaldo	42	(18)
1942	Osasuna	0	(0)
1942–1944	Barakaldo	13	(6)

International career
1931	Spain	1	(0)
- * Club domestic league appearances and goals

Agustín Sauto Arana (11 May 1908 – 21 August 1986), known as Bata, was a Spanish footballer who played as a striker.

He spent most of his career with Athletic Bilbao, scoring 208 goals in as many matches across all competitions and winning four La Liga championships. He is the only player to have scored 7 goals against Barcelona in a single match. The goals were scored during the 1930/1931 Laliga season in which Bilbao crushed the Catalans 11-1.

== Club career ==
Born in Barakaldo, Biscay, Bata started his career at hometown club Barakaldo CF. His nickname derived from the fact he used to wear an overall (bata in Spanish) made by his mother in order to prevent him from staining his better clothes; he was also dubbed El Bertha bilbaino (Bilbao's Bertha), El terror de San Mamés (terror of San Mamés) and El león enfurecido (raging lion).

Bata signed with Athletic Bilbao in 1929, and made his professional debut for them on 22 September in a 4–1 win against Deportivo Alavés for the Biscay Championship. In his first season, he won both the La Liga and Copa del Rey titles. His first goal in the former competition came on 23 March 1930, in a 4–3 success at Atlético Madrid; he was the focal point of what become a famous forward line at the club, along with José Iraragorri, Chirri II, Lafuente and Guillermo Gorostiza.

Bata achieved the same feat of league and cup double the following campaign, while also earning the Pichichi Trophy having scored 27 goals. Seven of those came in Athletic's historic 12–1 defeat of FC Barcelona on 18 February 1931, even though some sources only awarded him five and others as many as eight; he continued to play regularly until 1935–36 when he won the championship for a fourth time, but his career was then effectively ended at the age of 28 by the outbreak of the Spanish Civil War.

In the summer of 1938, Bata re-joined Barakaldo, but the competition would only be resumed the following year after the end of the war. He retired at the age of 35 after four seasons in Segunda División, and died on 21 August 1986 at 78 in Valle de Trápaga-Trapagaran.

== International career ==
In spite of his club achievements, Bata won only one cap for the Spain national team. It happened on 19 April 1931, in a friendly with Italy played in Bilbao.

== Career statistics ==
=== Club ===
Appearances and goals by club, season and competition
Club	Season	League			Cup		Regional championship		Totals		Ref.
Club	Season	Division	Apps	Goals	Apps	Goals	Apps	Goals	Apps	Goals	Ref.
Athletic Bilbao	1929–30	La Liga	7	1	5	4	8	7	20	12	
Athletic Bilbao	1930–31	La Liga	17	27	7	10	1	1	25	38	
Athletic Bilbao	1931–32	La Liga	18	12	6	6	8	11	32	29	
Athletic Bilbao	1932–33	La Liga	18	15	9	7	8	15	35	37	
Athletic Bilbao	1933–34	La Liga	17	12	6	7	7	15	30	34	
Athletic Bilbao	1934–35	La Liga	21	16	1	0	12	12	34	28	
Athletic Bilbao	1935–36	La Liga	20	22	4	2	8	6	32	30	
Athletic Bilbao	Total		118	105	38	36	52	67	208	208	–
Barakaldo	1938–39	Segunda División	0	0	6	5			6	5	
Barakaldo	1939–40	Segunda División	12	3	2	0			14	3	
Barakaldo	1940–41	Segunda División	19	7	6	1			17	9	
Barakaldo	1941–42	Segunda División	11	8	0	0			11	8	
Barakaldo	Total		42	18	14	6	0	0	56	24	–
Osasuna	1941–42	Segunda División	0	0	3	2			3	2	
Barakaldo	1942–43	Segunda División	9	5	2	0			11	5	
Barakaldo	1943–44	Segunda División	4	1	0	0			4	1	
Barakaldo	Total		13	6	2	0	0	0	15	6	–
Career total			173	129	54	42	52	67	279	238	–

== Honours ==
Athletic Bilbao

- La Liga: 1929–30, 1930–31, 1933–34, 1935–36
- Copa del Rey: 1930, 1931, 1932, 1933

Individual

- Pichichi Trophy: 1930–31, 1931–32
