= 1932 Copa del Presidente de la República =

32nd Copa del Rey

Tournament details
- Country: Spain
- Teams: 28

Final positions
- Champions: Athletic Bilbao (12th title)
- Runners-up: FC Barcelona

Tournament statistics
- Matches played: 56
- Goals scored: 228 (4.07 per match)

The Copa del Presidente de la República 1932 (President of the Republic's Cup) was the 32nd staging of the Copa del Rey, the Spanish football cup competition.

The competition started on April 10, 1932, and concluded on June 19, 1932, with the final, held at the Estadio Chamartín in Madrid. Athletic Bilbao won their 12th title, the third in a row.

== Teams ==
As in the previous tournaments, the teams qualified through the Regional Championships

- Andalusia: Sevilla FC, Betis Balompié
- Asturias–Cantabria: Oviedo FC, Sporting de Gijón, Racing de Santander
- Balearic Islands: CD Mallorca
- Canary Islands: CD Tenerife
- Catalonia: FC Barcelona, CD Español, CD Júpiter
- Extremadura: Don Benito FC
- Galicia: Celta de Vigo, Deportivo La Coruña
- Gipuzkoa–Navarre–Aragon: Unión Club, Donostia FC, CD Logroño, CA Osasuna
- Murcia: Murcia FC, Imperial FC
- Center Region-Aragon: Madrid CF, Athletic Madrid, Valladolid Deportivo, CD Nacional
- Valencia: Valencia CF, CD Castellón
- Biscay: Athletic Bilbao, CD Alavés, Arenas Club

== Round of 32 ==
The first leg was played on April 10. The second leg was played on April 17.

Team 1	Agg.	Team 2	1st leg	2nd leg
Athletic Madrid	2–2	CD Logroño	1–0	1–2
Sevilla FC	3–4	Donostia	3–2	0–2
CE Júpiter	3–7	Nacional Madrid	2–1	1–6
CD Alavés	4–2	CA Osasuna	3–1	1–1
Racing Santander	4–6	Deportivo La Coruña	4–1	0–5
CD Tenerife	2–5	Real Betis	1–1	1–4
Club Celta	22–0	Don Benito FC	9–0	13–0
Valladolid Deportivo	2–3	Valencia FC	1–1	1–2
Real Oviedo	2–2	Arenas Club	2–0	0–2
Imperial FC	3–8	Sporting Gijón	0–3	3–5
CD Castellón	5–3	Real Murcia	3–0	2–3
CD Mallorca	2–9	CD Español	1–1	1–8

FC Barcelona, Madrid FC, Unión Club and Athletic Bilbao received a bye.

- Tiebreaker

Team 1	Score	Team 2
Athletic Madrid	1–0	CD Logroño
Arenas Club	4–2	Real Oviedo

== Round of 16 ==
The first leg was played on May 8. The second leg was played on May 15.

Team 1	Agg.	Team 2	1st leg	2nd leg
Nacional Madrid	2–3	Celta Vigo	2–1	0–2
Deportivo La Coruña	3–2	Madrid FC	2-0	1–2
CD Alavés	7–7	Athletic Madrid	7–1	0–6
Unión Club	2–7	Athletic Bilbao	1–3	1–4
CD Castellón	3–11	Donostia FC	2–3	1–8
Arenas Club	3–5	Sporting Gijón	2–3	1–2
Real Betis	2–4	CD Español	2–1	0–3
FC Barcelona	5–2	Valencia CF	2–0	3–2

- Tiebreaker

Team 1	Score	Team 2
CD Alavés	3–1	Athletic Madrid

== Quarter-finals ==
The first leg was played on May 22. The second leg was played on May 29.

Team 1	Agg.	Team 2	1st leg	2nd leg
Athletic Bilbao	5–2	CD Alavés	2–0	3–2
FC Barcelona	2–1	Donostia FC	1–0	1–1
Sporting Gijón	0–3	Club Celta	0–0	0–3
Deportivo La Coruña	3–9	CD Español	3–3	0–6

== Semi-finals ==
The first leg was played on June 5. The second leg was played on June 12.

Team 1	Agg.	Team 2	1st leg	2nd leg
Athletic Bilbao	12–1	CD Español	8–1	4–0
FC Barcelona	4–2	Club Celta	3–0	1–2

== Final ==
19 June 1932
17:15 CET

Athletic Bilbao	1–0	FC Barcelona
Bata 55'

Chamartín, Madrid
Attendance: 25,000
Referee: Pedro Escartín

Copa del Rey 1932 winners
Athletic Bilbao
12th title
