= 1930–31 La Liga =

3rd season of La Liga

Primera División
- Season: 1930–31
- Champions: Athletic Bilbao (2nd title)
- Relegated: Europa
- Matches: 90
- Goals: 384 (4.27 per match)
- Top goalscorer: Bata (27 goals)
- Biggest home win: Athletic Bilbao 12–1 Barcelona
- Biggest away win: Real Madrid 0–6 Athletic Bilbao
- Highest scoring: Athletic Bilbao 12–1 Barcelona
- Longest winning run: 6 matches Real Sociedad
- Longest unbeaten run: 7 matches Barcelona
- Longest winless run: 7 matches Real Unión
- Longest losing run: 5 matches Europa

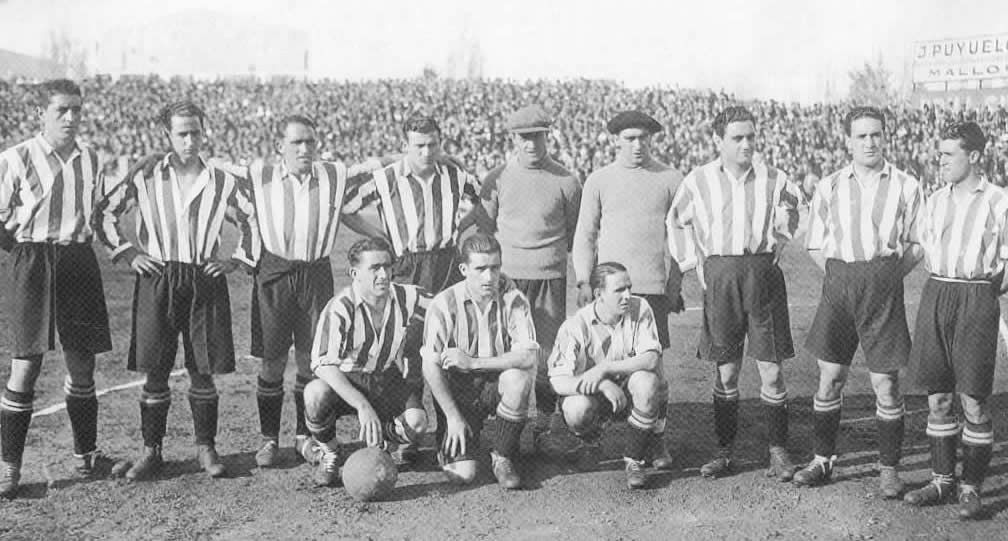
Athletic Club of Bilbao, 1930-31 Spanish League Champions. Line up: Muguerza, Chirri II, Urquido, Lafuente, Blasco, Ispizua, Uribe, Unamuno, Castellanos, Bata, R. Echevarria & Gorostiza

The 1930–31 La Liga season started 7 December 1930, and finished 5 April 1931.

Athletic Bilbao defended the title successfully and won the league thanks to its better goal difference in a three-way tie in the first position. Alavés made their debut in La Liga.

== Team information ==
Location of teams in 1930–31 La Liga

Club	City	Stadium
Alavés	Vitoria-Gasteiz	Mendizorroza
Arenas	Getxo	Ibaiondo
Athletic Bilbao	Bilbao	San Mamés
Barcelona	Barcelona	Les Corts
Español	Barcelona	Sarriá
Europa	Barcelona	El Guinardó
Racing Santander	Santander	El Sardinero
Real Madrid	Madrid	Chamartín
Real Sociedad	San Sebastián	Atocha
Real Unión	Irun	Gal

== League table ==
Pos	Team	Pld	W	D	L	GF	GA	GD	Pts	Relegation
1	Athletic Bilbao (C)	18	11	0	7	73	33	+40	22 (Note: Athletic Bilbao finished ahead of Racing Santander and Real Sociedad on head-to-head goal difference: Athletic Bilbao +7, Racing Santander –3, Real Sociedad –4)	
2	Racing Santander	18	10	2	6	49	37	+12	22	
3	Real Sociedad	18	10	2	6	42	39	+3	22	
4	Barcelona	18	7	7	4	40	43	−3	21	
5	Arenas	18	8	2	8	35	38	−3	18 (Note: Arenas finished ahead of Real Madrid on head-to-head points: Arenas–Real Madrid 4–1, Real Madrid–Arenas 1–2.)	
6	Real Madrid	18	7	4	7	24	32	−8	18	
7	Real Unión	18	6	4	8	41	45	−4	16	
8	Alavés	18	5	4	9	25	39	−14	14 (Note: Alavés finished ahead of Español on head-to-head goal difference: Alavés–Español 4–1, Español–Alavés 2–0.)	
9	Español	18	6	2	10	32	45	−13	14	
10	Europa (R)	18	6	1	11	23	38	−15	13	Relegation to the Segunda División

Source: BDFútbol
Rules for classification: 1) points; 2) head-to-head points; 3) head-to-head goal difference; 4) goal difference; 5) number of goals scored.
(C) Champions; (R) Relegated

== Results ==
Home \ Away	ALA	ARE	ATH	BAR	ESP	EUR	RAC	RMA	RSO	RUN
Alavés	—	3–2	1–4	1–1	4–1	2–0	2–5	2–0	1–2	3–1
Arenas	1–1	—	3–2	5–0	1–0	1–0	4–2	4–1	1–3	1–2
Athletic Bilbao	7–1	5–2	—	12–1	5–1	4–1	7–1	2–4	6–1	1–2
Barcelona	1–1	2–0	6–3	—	6–2	0–2	1–1	3–1	5–1	5–3
Español	2–0	5–0	0–4	4–4	—	4–0	4–1	1–1	1–0	4–2
Europa	1–0	1–4	2–1	2–2	3–1	—	1–2	0–3	2–1	2–1
Racing Santander	4–0	4–1	4–1	0–1	4–0	2–1	—	3–0	2–5	4–1
Real Madrid	1–0	1–2	0–6	0–0	2–0	3–1	0–0	—	2–0	3–0
Real Sociedad	2–2	4–1	1–0	4–1	2–1	3–1	4–7	2–1	—	3–3
Real Unión	4–1	2–2	2–3	1–1	6–1	4–3	4–3	1–1	2–4	—

Source: BDFútbol.com
Legend: Blue = home team win; Yellow = draw; Red = away team win.

== Top scorers ==
Note: this year there are no difference between La liga top scorers and the Pichichi Trophy

Rank	Goalscorers	Goal	Team
1	(Spain) Bata	27	Athletic Bilbao
2	(Spain) Guillermo Gorostiza	17	Athletic Bilbao
3	(Spain) Ángel Arocha	16	Barcelona
4	(Spain) Santiago Urtizberea	15	Real Unión
5	(Spain) Cholín	13	Real Sociedad
5	(Spain) Telete	13	Racing Santander
7	(Spain) José Iraragorri	11	Athletic Bilbao
7	(Spain) Luis Regueiro	11	Real Unión
7	(Cuba) Edelmiro Lorenzo	11	Español
10	(Spain) Manuel Olivares	10	Alavés
10	(Spain) Paco Bienzobas	10	Real Sociedad
