= José Iraragorri =

Spanish footballer and manager

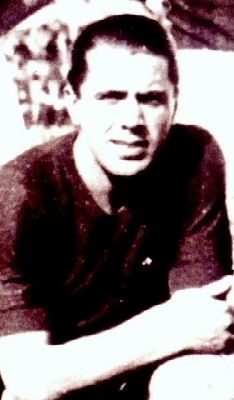

Personal information
- Full name: José Iraragorri Ealo
- Date of birth: 16 March 1912
- Place of birth: Basauri, Spain
- Date of death: 27 April 1983 (aged 71)
- Place of death: Galdakao, Spain
- Height: 1.78 m (5 ft 10 in)
- Position: Striker

Senior career*
Years	Team	Apps	(Gls)
1929–1936	Athletic Bilbao	114	(81)
1938–1939	Club Deportivo Euzkadi		
1939–1940	San Lorenzo	5	(0)
1943–1946	España		
1946–1949	Athletic Bilbao	26	(7)

International career
1931–1936	Spain	7	(2)

Managerial career
- 1947–1948: Barakaldo
- 1949–1952: Athletic Bilbao
- 1952–1953: Real Valladolid
- 1953–1954: Celta de Vigo
- Hércules
- Indautxu
- * Club domestic league appearances and goals

José Iraragorri Ealo (16 March 1912 – 27 April 1983), nicknamed "Chato", was a Spanish footballer who played as an inside left.

== Career ==
=== Club ===
Born in Basauri, Iraragorri initially played for Athletic Bilbao between 1929 and 1936, during which he won La Liga and the Copa del Rey four times each, as well as five regional championships; he was part of a famed forward line with Chirri II, Guillermo Gorostiza, Lafuente and Bata.

His career was interrupted by the Spanish Civil War, and he and his teammates toured Europe as the Basque national side, who then went to Mexico as Club Deportivo Euzkadi.

Iraragorri thereafter moved to Argentina's Club Atlético San Lorenzo de Almagro along with fellow Basques Isidro Lángara and Ángel Zubieta, spending two years in Buenos Aires. He went back to Mexico to play for Real Club España, before finally returning to Spain and Athletic Bilbao from 1946 to 1949.

On retiring as a player aged 37, he immediately became the Athletic manager, remaining in the post for the next three seasons (winning another Cup in 1950); he also coached other clubs for short spells.

=== International ===
Iraragorri also played 7 games for the Spain national football team, scoring one goal (two goals according to the official FIFA report) in the 1934 FIFA World Cup match against Brazil.
