= 1933–34 La Liga =

6th season of La Liga

Primera División
- Season: 1933–34
- Champions: Athletic Bilbao (3rd title)
- Matches: 90
- Goals: 378 (4.2 per match)
- Top goalscorer: Isidro Lángara (27)
- Biggest home win: Athletic Bilbao 9–0 Arenas
- Biggest away win: Español 1–4 Athletic Bilbao
- Highest scoring: Oviedo 7–3 Barcelona
- Longest winning run: 5 matches Athletic Bilbao
- Longest unbeaten run: 8 matches Donostia
- Longest winless run: 5 matches Donostia
- Longest losing run: 7 matches Arenas

1933–34 La Liga season started on 5 November 1933, and finished on 4 March 1934.

Athletic Bilbao reconquered the title three seasons after. Oviedo made its debut in La Liga and due to the expansion of the league to twelve teams, there were not any relegation at the end of the season.

== Team information ==
Location of teams in 1933–34 La Liga

Club	City	Stadium
Arenas	Getxo	Ibaiondo
Athletic Bilbao	Bilbao	San Mamés
Barcelona	Barcelona	Les Corts
Betis	Seville	Patronato Obrero
Donostia	San Sebastián	Atocha
Español	Barcelona	Sarriá
Madrid FC	Madrid	Chamartín
Oviedo	Oviedo	Buenavista
Racing Santander	Santander	El Sardinero
Valencia	Valencia	Mestalla

== League table ==
Pos	Team	Pld	W	D	L	GF	GA	GD	Pts
1	Athletic Bilbao (C)	18	11	2	5	61	27	+34	24
2	Madrid FC	18	10	2	6	41	29	+12	22
3	Racing Santander	18	9	1	8	38	39	−1	19 (Note: Racing Santander finished ahead of Betis on head-to-head goal difference: Racing Santander–Betis 4–1, Betis–Racing Santander 2–1.)
4	Betis	18	9	1	8	29	36	−7	19
5	Donostia	18	7	4	7	29	33	−4	18 (Note: Donostia finished ahead of Oviedo on head-to-head goal difference: Donostia–Oviedo 3–1, Oviedo–Donostia 3–2.)
6	Oviedo	18	8	2	8	51	45	+6	18
7	Valencia	18	7	3	8	28	38	−10	17 (Note: Valencia finished ahead of Español on head-to-head points: Valencia–Español 1–0, Español–Valencia 2–2.)
8	Español	18	7	3	8	41	42	−1	17
9	Barcelona	18	8	0	10	42	40	+2	16
10	Arenas	18	3	4	11	18	49	−31	10

Source: BDFútbol
Rules for classification: 1) points; 2) head-to-head points; 3) head-to-head goal difference; 4) goal difference; 5) number of goals scored.
(C) Champions

== Results ==
Home \ Away	ARE	ATH	BAR	BET	DON	ESP	MAD	OVI	RAC	VAL
Arenas	—	2–0	3–1	0–1	0–0	1–2	3–3	1–1	2–1	1–2
Athletic Bilbao	9–0	—	6–1	5–0	2–1	5–0	5–1	6–2	3–1	6–2
Barcelona	4–0	2–1	—	5–1	4–0	5–0	1–2	2–0	6–3	5–2
Betis	2–0	1–3	1–0	—	1–1	3–1	2–1	4–2	2–1	2–1
Donostia	4–1	3–0	2–0	3–2	—	3–3	0–3	3–1	2–1	3–1
Español	6–2	1–4	3–2	3–1	4–0	—	2–2	5–2	5–0	2–2
Madrid FC	2–1	3–0	4–0	0–1	2–0	3–2	—	5–1	1–0	3–2
Oviedo	7–0	2–2	7–3	4–3	3–2	3–1	3–2	—	3–1	7–0
Racing Santander	4–1	3–2	3–1	4–1	1–1	3–1	4–3	4–3	—	2–1
Valencia	0–0	2–2	2–0	2–1	4–1	1–0	2–1	1–0	1–2	—

Source: BDFútbol.com
Legend: Blue = home team win; Yellow = draw; Red = away team win.

== Top scorers ==
Rank	Goalscorers	Team	Goals
1	(Spain) Isidro Lángara	Oviedo	26
2	(Spain) Francisco Iriondo	Español	18
3	(Spain) José Iraragorri	Athletic Bilbao	17
4	(Spain) Bata	Athletic Bilbao	14
4	(Spain) Guillermo Gorostiza	Athletic Bilbao	14
6	(Spain) Martí Ventolrà	Barcelona	13
7	(Spain) Luis Regueiro	Madrid FC	12
8	(Spain) Simón Lecue	Betis	11
8	(Spain) Victorio Unamuno	Betis	11
8	(Spain) Herrerita	Oviedo	11

=== Pichichi Trophy ===
Note: This list is the alternative top scorers list provided by newspaper Diario Marca; it differs from the one above which is based on official match reports.

Goalscorers	Goal	Team
(Spain) Isidro Lángara	27	Oviedo
(Spain) Francisco Iriondo Orozco	18	Español
(Spain) José Iraragorri	17	Athletic Bilbao
