= 1929–30 La Liga =

2nd season of La Liga

Primera División
- Season: 1929–30
- Champions: Athletic Bilbao (1st title)
- Relegated: Athletic Madrid
- Matches: 90
- Goals: 420 (4.67 per match)
- Top goalscorer: Guillermo Gorostiza (Athletic Bilbao, 20)
- Biggest home win: Español 8–1 Real Madrid; Real Sociedad 7–0 Racing Santander
- Biggest away win: Real Sociedad 1–7 Athletic Bilbao
- Highest scoring: Real Unión 8–2 Athletic Madrid
- Longest winning run: 7 matches Athletic Bilbao
- Longest unbeaten run: 18 matches Athletic Bilbao
- Longest winless run: 7 matches Athletic Madrid
- Longest losing run: 6 matches Europa

The 1929–30 Primera División season started 1 December 1929, and finished 30 March 1930. A total of 10 teams contested the league, where Barcelona were the defending champions. As different from the previous season, the last qualified team was directly relegated.

Athletic Bilbao achieved their first title ever after ending the season unbeaten.

== Team information ==
Location of teams in 1929–30 La Liga

Club	City	Stadium
Arenas	Getxo	Ibaiondo
Athletic Bilbao	Bilbao	San Mamés
Athletic Madrid	Madrid	Metropolitano
Barcelona	Barcelona	Les Corts
Español	Barcelona	Sarriá
Europa	Barcelona	El Guinardó
Racing Santander	Santander	El Sardinero
Real Madrid	Madrid	Chamartín
Real Sociedad	San Sebastián	Atocha
Real Unión	Irun	Gal

== League table ==
Pos	Team	Pld	W	D	L	GF	GA	GD	Pts	Relegation
1	Athletic Bilbao (C)	18	12	6	0	63	28	+35	30	
2	Barcelona	18	11	1	6	46	36	+10	23	
3	Arenas	18	9	2	7	51	40	+11	20 (Note: Arenas finished ahead of Español on head-to-head goal difference: Arenas–Español 2–0, Español–Arenas 1–0)	
4	Español	18	9	2	7	40	33	+7	20	
5	Real Madrid	18	7	3	8	45	42	+3	17 (Note: Real Madrid finished ahead of Real Unión on overall goal difference.)	
6	Real Unión	18	6	5	7	48	52	−4	17	
7	Real Sociedad	18	5	4	9	34	37	−3	14 (Note: Real Sociedad finished ahead of Racing Santander on head-to-head goal difference: Real Sociedad–Racing Santander 7–0, Racing Santander–Real Sociedad 2–0)	
8	Racing Santander	18	7	0	11	32	58	−26	14	
9	Europa	18	6	1	11	29	44	−15	13	
10	Athletic Madrid (R)	18	5	2	11	32	50	−18	12	Relegation to the Segunda División

Source: BDFútbol
Rules for classification: 1) points; 2) head-to-head points; 3) head-to-head goal difference; 4) goal difference; 5) number of goals scored.
(C) Champions; (R) Relegated

== Results ==
Home \ Away	ARE	ATH	ATM	BAR	ESP	EUR	RAC	RMA	RSO	RUN
Arenas	—	3–3	2–1	1–3	2–0	2–3	5–1	5–1	3–1	7–2
Athletic Bilbao	5–2	—	6–1	4–3	6–0	3–0	4–0	2–1	2–2	5–2
Athletic Madrid	1–3	3–4	—	3–2	2–0	5–3	3–1	2–1	1–1	3–3
Barcelona	3–1	1–1	4–2	—	5–4	2–1	5–0	1–4	3–0	4–2
Español	1–0	2–2	1–0	4–0	—	1–2	3–0	8–1	3–1	3–1
Europa	1–2	2–2	2–0	0–3	1–2	—	5–0	1–2	3–2	0–1
Racing Santander	2–5	2–3	3–2	2–1	4–1	6–1	—	2–0	2–0	4–2
Real Madrid	5–2	2–3	4–1	5–1	2–4	6–1	6–0	—	1–1	2–2
Real Sociedad	4–4	1–7	2–0	1–2	1–0	2–0	7–0	4–0	—	2–3
Real Unión	3–2	1–1	8–2	1–3	3–3	3–4	6–3	2–2	3–2	—

Source: BDFútbol
Legend: Blue = home team win; Yellow = draw; Red = away team win.

== Top scorers ==
Rank	Goalscorers	Goal	Team
1	(Spain) Guillermo Gorostiza	20	Athletic Bilbao
2	(Spain) Gaspar Rubio	19	Real Madrid
3	(Spain) Santiago Urtizberea	18	Real Unión
4	(Spain) Víctor Unamuno	15	Athletic Bilbao
5	(Spain) Luis Regueiro	14	Real Unión
5	(Spain) Manuel Gurruchaga	14	Arenas
7	(Spain) José Iraragorri	13	Athletic Bilbao
8	(Spain) Luis Marín	12	Athletic Madrid
8	(Spain) Martín Ventolrà	12	Español
10	(Spain) Ángel Arocha	11	Barcelona

=== Pichichi Trophy ===
Note: This list is the alternative top scorers list provided by newspaper Diario Marca, it differs from the one above which is based on official match reports

Goalscorers	Goal	Team
(Spain) Guillermo Gorostiza	19	Athletic Bilbao
(Spain) Gaspar Rubio	18	Real Madrid
(Spain) Santiago Urtizberea	18	Real Unión
(Spain) Víctor Unamuno	15	Athletic Bilbao
(Spain) Luis Regueiro	14	Real Unión
(Spain) Manuel Gurruchaga	14	Arenas Club
