= 1935–36 La Liga =

8th season of La Liga

Primera División
- Season: 1935–36
- Champions: Athletic Bilbao (4th title)
- Relegated: Osasuna
- Matches: 132
- Goals: 528 (4 per match)
- Top goalscorer: Isidro Lángara (27 goals)
- Biggest home win: Athletic Bilbao 7–0 Betis
- Biggest away win: Racing Santander 2–6 Oviedo
- Highest scoring: Madrid FC 5–4 Oviedo; Osasuna 4–5 Oviedo; Osasuna 6–3 Sevilla
- Longest winning run: 5 matches Athletic Bilbao; Hércules
- Longest unbeaten run: 6 matches Valencia
- Longest winless run: 9 matches Sevilla
- Longest losing run: 6 matches Athletic Madrid

The 1935–36 La Liga was the eighth edition of the Spanish national league, and the last one before the Spanish Civil War. The season started 10 November 1935, and finished 19 April 1936.

Athletic Bilbao achieved their fourth title. Hércules and Osasuna made their debuts in La Liga.

== Team locations ==
Location of teams in 1935–36 La Liga

Club	City	Stadium
Athletic Bilbao	Bilbao	San Mamés
Athletic Madrid	Madrid	Metropolitano
Barcelona	Barcelona	Les Corts
Betis	Seville	Patronato Obrero
Español	Barcelona	Sarriá
Hércules	Alicante	Bardín
Madrid FC	Madrid	Chamartín
Osasuna	Pamplona	San Juan
Oviedo	Oviedo	Buenavista
Racing Santander	Santander	El Sardinero
Sevilla	Seville	Nervión
Valencia	Valencia	Mestalla

== League table ==
Pos	Team	Pld	W	D	L	GF	GA	GD	Pts	Relegation
1	Athletic Bilbao (C)	22	14	3	5	59	33	+26	31	
2	Madrid FC	22	13	3	6	62	35	+27	29	
3	Oviedo (Note: Due to the poor condition of their field at Buenavista after the Civil War, Oviedo did not enter the 1939–40 La Liga. It was decided to allow Oviedo one season to improve their pitch, automatically qualifying them to play the 1940–41 La Liga. A match between the two last qualified teams would determine the team that would occupy their spot.)	22	12	4	6	63	47	+16	28	Did not play the next season
4	Racing Santander	22	13	1	8	58	46	+12	27	
5	Barcelona	22	11	2	9	39	32	+7	24 (Note: Barcelona finished ahead of Hércules on head-to-head points: Hércules–Barcelona 2–2, Barcelona–Hércules 1–0.)	
6	Hércules	22	11	2	9	37	41	−4	24	
7	Betis	22	9	2	11	31	46	−15	20	
8	Valencia	22	7	5	10	36	42	−6	19	
9	Español	22	8	1	13	36	53	−17	17	
10	Sevilla	22	6	4	12	27	48	−21	16	
11	Athletic Madrid (O)	22	6	3	13	34	50	−16	15	
12	Osasuna (R)	22	7	0	15	46	55	−9	14	Relegation to the Segunda División

Source: BDFútbol
Rules for classification: 1) points; 2) head-to-head points; 3) head-to-head goal difference; 4) goal difference; 5) number of goals scored.
(C) Champions; (O) Play-off winners; (R) Relegated

== Results ==
Home \ Away	ATH	ATM	BAR	BET	ESP	HER	MAD	OSA	OVI	RAC	SEV	VAL
Athletic Bilbao	—	3–1	5–2	7–0	5–2	5–3	1–0	2–0	4–2	6–1	4–1	3–2
Athletic Madrid	1–2	—	0–3	5–0	3–2	1–2	2–3	2–0	3–0	1–0	2–3	2–2
Barcelona	2–0	5–1	—	1–0	2–0	1–0	0–3	5–0	5–2	2–3	4–1	0–0
Betis	1–2	3–0	2–0	—	3–0	1–1	1–1	5–1	1–2	3–1	1–0	3–0
Español	2–0	2–3	1–0	3–0	—	3–2	3–0	3–0	1–5	1–1	6–1	3–2
Hércules	1–0	2–1	2–2	3–0	2–1	—	0–1	1–0	1–0	4–1	2–1	2–0
Madrid FC	2–2	3–1	3–0	5–1	6–0	5–1	—	6–2	5–4	2–4	3–3	4–1
Osasuna	4–1	4–0	0–1	6–0	6–1	3–0	1–4	—	4–5	3–1	6–3	2–3
Oviedo	3–3	4–1	2–1	2–3	5–2	5–2	1–0	5–2	—	4–2	0–0	4–3
Racing Santander	2–1	5–2	4–0	5–1	4–0	4–2	4–3	3–1	2–6	—	3–0	6–2
Sevilla	0–2	1–1	2–1	1–0	2–0	1–2	2–1	2–0	1–1	1–2	—	1–2
Valencia	1–1	1–1	1–2	0–2	1–0	5–2	1–2	2–1	1–1	1–0	5–0	—

Source: BDFútbol.com
Legend: Blue = home team win; Yellow = draw; Red = away team win.

== Relegation play-off ==
After the Spanish Civil War, Oviedo withdrew from the 1939–40 La Liga, so their place was decided to be occupied by the winner of a play-off between Athletic Madrid, now Athletic Aviación, and Osasuna; the two last qualified teams in the previous season.

Team 1	Score	Team 2
Athletic Aviación	3–1	Osasuna

== Top scorers ==
Rank	Goalscorers	Goal	Team
1	(Spain) Isidro Lángara	Oviedo	28
2	(Spain) Bata	Athletic Bilbao	21
3	(Spain) Fernando Sañudo	Madrid FC	20
3	(Spain) Julián Vergara	Osasuna	20
5	(Spain) Antonio Chas	Racing Santander	15
8	(Spain) Josep Escolà	Barcelona	13
8	(Spain) Herrerita	Oviedo	13
8	(Spain) Milucho	Racing Santander	13
9	(Spain) Emilio Blázquez	Hércules	12

=== Pichichi Trophy ===
Note: This list is the alternative top scorers list provided by newspaper Diario Marca; it differs from the one above which is based on official match reports.

Goalscorers	Goal	Team
(Spain) Isidro Lángara	27	Oviedo CF
(Spain) Bata	21	Athletic Bilbao
(Spain) Fernando Sañudo	20	Madrid FC
(Spain) Julián Vergara	19	Osasuna

== Literature ==
- Martínez Calatrava, Vicente (2001). Historia y estadística del fúbol español. De la Olimpiada de Amberes a la Guerra Civil (1920-1939). ISBN 9788460757665
