= 1931 Copa del Rey =

1931 Republic's Cup
31st Copa del Rey

Tournament details
- Country: Spain
- Teams: 30

Final positions
- Champions: Athletic Bilbao (11th title)
- Runners-up: Betis

Tournament statistics
- Matches played: 56
- Goals scored: 207 (3.7 per match)

The Republic's Cup 1931 was the 31st staging of the Copa del Rey, the Spanish football cup competition.

With the proclamation of the Second Spanish Republic on April 14, all teams with "Real" ("Royal") in their names, changed it due to anti-monarchic reasons. Real Sociedad changes to Donostia FC. Most of this changes were done between first and second legs of the first round.

The competition started on April 12, 1931, and concluded on June 21, 1931, with the final, held at the Estadio Chamartín in Madrid. Athletic Bilbao won their 11th title, the second in a row.

== Teams ==
- Andalusia: Sevilla FC, Betis Balompié
- Aragón: Iberia SC, Patria Aragón
- Asturias: Oviedo FC, Sporting de Gijón
- Balearic Islands: RCD Mallorca
- Cantabria: Racing de Santander, Eclipse FC
- Castile and León: Cultural y Deportiva Leonesa, Valladolid Deportivo
- Catalonia: FC Barcelona, CD Sabadell, FC Badalona
- Extremadura: Don Benito FC
- Galicia: Celta de Vigo, Deportivo La Coruña
- Gipuzkoa: Unión Club, Donostia FC, CD Logroño
- Murcia: Murcia FC, Lorca FC
- Center Region: Madrid CF, Athletic Madrid, Racing de Madrid
- Valencia: Valencia CF, CD Castellón
- Biscay: Athletic Bilbao, CD Alavés, Arenas Club

== Round of 32 ==
The first leg was played on April 12. The second leg was played on May 3.

Team 1	Agg.	Team 2	1st leg	2nd leg
Racing de Madrid	3–8	Sevilla FC	2–0	1–8
Betis Balompié	6–5	Donostia	5–1	1–4
FC Barcelona	12–1	Don Benito	9–0	3–1
CD Alavés	4–5	CD Sabadell	2–2	2–3
Unión Club	4–2	Celta Vigo	3–1	1–1
Racing Santander	1–7	Arenas Club	0–2	1–5
CD Logroño	15–1	Cultural Leonesa	7–0	8–1
Valencia CF	5–4	Iberia SC	2–0	3–4
RCD Mallorca	1–3	CD Castellón	1–0	0–3
Valladolid Deportivo	4–2	Athletic Madrid	2–1	2–1
Madrid FC	9–2	Eclipse FC	4–0	5–2
Deportivo La Coruña	1-3	Murcia FC	0–1	1–2
FC Badalona	withdrew	CD Patria Aragón		
Oviedo FC	withdrew	Lorca Deportiva		

Athletic Bilbao and Sporting Gijón received a bye.

== Round of 16 ==
The first leg was played on May 10. The second leg was played on May 17.

Team 1	Agg.	Team 2	1st leg	2nd leg
Valencia CF	4–3	FC Barcelona	2–2	2–1
FC Badalona	1–2	Betis Balompié	1–0	0–2
Athletic Bilbao	5–3	CD Sabadell	4–0	1–3
Sevilla FC	4–4	CD Castellón	3–1	1–3
Oviedo FC	1–6	Arenas Club	1–2	0–4
Unión Club	4–1	Sporting Gijón	4–1	0–0
Valladolid Deportivo	0–4	CD Logroño	0–0	0-4
Madrid FC	3–0	Murcia	3–0	0–0

- Tiebreaker

Played in Madrid on May 19.

Team 1	Score	Team 2
CD Castellón	2–1	Sevilla FC

== Quarter-finals ==
The first leg was played on May 24. The second leg was played on May 31.

Team 1	Agg.	Team 2	1st leg	2nd leg
Arenas Club	3–3	Valencia CF	2–2	1–1
Unión Club	2–6	Athletic Bilbao	2–2	0–4
Betis Balompié	3–1	Madrid FC	3–0	0–1
CD Castellón	2–3	CD Logroño	2–0	0–3

- Tiebreaker

Played in Barcelona on June 2.

Team 1	Score	Team 2
Arenas Club	2–1	Valencia CF

== Semi-finals ==
The first leg was played on June 7. The second leg was played on June 14.

Team 1	Agg.	Team 2	1st leg	2nd leg
CD Logroño	3-12	Athletic Bilbao	0–6	3–6
Arenas Club	2–2	Betis Balompié	2–1	0–1

- Tiebreaker

Played in Madrid on June 16.

Team 1	Score	Team 2
Betis Balompié	2–0	Arenas Club

== Final ==
21 June 1931
17:30 CET

Athletic Bilbao	3–1	Betis Balompié
Chirri II 17'; Roberto 38'; Bata 54'		57' Sanz

Chamartín, Madrid
Attendance: 20,000
Referee: Jesús Arribas

Copa del Rey 1931 winners
Athletic Bilbao
11th title
