= 2026–27 Athletic Bilbao season =

Athletic Bilbao 2026–27 football season

Athletic Bilbao
2026–27 season
- President: Jon Uriarte
- Head coach: Edin Terzić
- Stadium: San Mamés
- La Liga: 7th
- Copa del Rey: Second round
- Top goalscorer: League: Álex Berenguer (4); All: Álex Berenguer (4)
- Highest home attendance: 50,092 vs Real Sociedad
- Lowest home attendance: 44,160 vs Getafe
- Average home league attendance: 47,534
- Biggest win: 4–0 (H) vs Getafe
- Biggest defeat: 1–3 (H) vs Sevilla
| Home colours | Away colours | Third colours |

The 2026–27 season is the 128th season in the history of Athletic Bilbao, and the club's 96th consecutive season in La Liga. In addition to the domestic league, the club is also participating in the Copa del Rey.

The season is the first since 2015–16 without Iñigo Lekue, who retired at the end of the previous season after spending his entire professional career with the club. It is also the first since the 2016–17 season without Mikel Vesga, who moved to Almería on an undisclosed fee.

== Players ==
As of 3 September 2026

Note: Flags indicate national team as defined under FIFA eligibility rules; some limited exceptions apply. Players may hold more than one non-FIFA nationality.

| No. | Pos. | Nation | Player |
|---|---|---|---|
| 1 | GK | ESP | Unai Simón (Vice-captain) |
| 3 | DF | ESP | Dani Vivian |
| 4 | DF | ESP | Aitor Paredes |
| 5 | DF | ESP | Yeray Álvarez (3rd captain) |
| 6 | MF | ESP | Beñat Prados |
| 7 | FW | ESP | Álex Berenguer |
| 8 | MF | ESP | Oihan Sancet |
| 9 | FW | GHA | Iñaki Williams (captain) |
| 10 | FW | ESP | Nico Williams |
| 11 | FW | ESP | Gorka Guruzeta |
| 12 | DF | ESP | Jesús Areso |
| 13 | GK | MEX | Álex Padilla |
| 14 | DF | ESP | Aymeric Laporte |
| 15 | DF | ESP | Hugo Rincón |
| 16 | MF | ESP | Iñigo Ruiz de Galarreta |

| No. | Pos. | Nation | Player |
|---|---|---|---|
| 17 | DF | ESP | Yuri Berchiche (4th captain) |
| 18 | MF | ESP | Mikel Jauregizar |
| 20 | MF | ESP | Alejandro Rego |
| 21 | FW | MAR | Maroan Sannadi |
| 22 | FW | ESP | Nico Serrano |
| 23 | FW | ESP | Robert Navarro |
| 24 | MF | ESP | Beñat Gerenabarrena |
| 25 | FW | GBS | Álvaro Djaló |
| 26 | GK | ESP | Mikel Santos |
| 28 | MF | ESP | Peio Canales |
| — | DF | ESP | Unai Egiluz |
| 29 | FW | ESP | Asier Hierro |
| 30 | DF | ESP | Iker Monreal |
| 31 | DF | FRA | Johaneko Louis-Jean |
| 44 | MF | ESP | Selton Sánchez |

=== Out on Loan ===
Note: Flags indicate national team as defined under FIFA eligibility rules; some limited exceptions apply. Players may hold more than one non-FIFA nationality.

| No. | Pos. | Nation | Player |
|---|---|---|---|
| — | DF | ESP | Andoni Gorosabel (at Espanyol until 30 June 2027) |
| — | MF | ESP | Eder García (at Córdoba until 30 June 2027) |
| — | DF | ESP | Adama Boiro (at West Ham until 30 June 2027) |

== Transfers ==
=== In ===
| Pos. | Player | From | Fee | Date | Ref. |
|---|---|---|---|---|---|
| FW | (Guinea-Bissau) Álvaro Djaló | (Qatar) Al Gharafa | Loan return | 1 July 2026 | |
| DF | (Spain) Hugo Rincón | Girona | Loan return | 1 July 2026 | |
| MF | (Spain) Peio Canales | Racing Santander | Loan return | 1 July 2026 | |
| FW | (Spain) Beñat Gerenabarrena | Castellón | Loan return | 1 July 2026 | |

=== Out ===
| Pos. | Player | To | Fee | Date | Ref. |
|---|---|---|---|---|---|
| DF | (Spain) Iñigo Lekue | Retired | N/A | 30 June 2026 | |
| MF | (Spain) Ibon Sánchez | Cádiz | Undisclosed | 7 July 2026 | |
| MF | (Spain) Eder García | Cordoba | Loan | 8 July 2026 | |
| MF | (Spain) Unai Gómez | (Italy) Udinese | Undisclosed (Note: Reported as €4,500,000) | 8 July 2026 | |
| FW | (Spain) Urko Izeta | Cádiz | Undisclosed (Note: Reported as €1,500,000) | 11 July 2026 | |
| MF | (Spain) Mikel Vesga | Almería | Undisclosed | 2 August 2026 | |
| GK | (Spain) Julen Agirrezabala | Racing Santander | Undisclosed (Note: Reported as €4,500,000) | 10 August 2026 | |
| DF | (Spain) Andoni Gorosabel | Espanyol | Loan | 1 September 2026 | |
| DF | (Spain) Adama Boiro | (England) West Ham | Loan | 1 September 2026 | |
| MF | (Spain) Unai Vencedor | Burgos | Free transfer | 2 September 2026 | |

== Pre-season and friendlies ==
| 15 July 2026 1 | Derio | 0–3 | Athletic Bilbao | Portugalete |
| 19:30 CEST (UTC+2) | | Report | Navarro 52', 80'; Sancet 56' | Stadium: La Florida; Referee: Ricardo de Burgos Bengoetxea |

| 18 July 2026 2 | Leioa | 0–11 | Athletic Bilbao | Leioa |
| 19:30 CEST (UTC+2) | | Report | Navarro 7', 31'; Djaló 10', 25'; Sancet 17', 19', 41'; Berenguer 60'; Artola 80' (o.g.); Hierro 83', 90' | Stadium: José Ignacio Azkueta; Referee: Íñigo Pérez Ansoleaga |

| 22 July 2026 3 | Sestao | 0–2 | Athletic Bilbao | Sestao |
| 19:30 CEST (UTC+2) | | Report | Guruzeta 2'; Sancet 90+1' | Stadium: Las Llanas; Attendance: 4,000; Referee: Jon Andrade del Olmo |

| 25 July 2026 4 | Athletic Bilbao | 2–2 | Eibar | Zamudio |
| 19:00 CEST (UTC+2) | Guruzeta 25'; Berchiche 90+2' | Report | Ares 4'; Martón 32' | Stadium: Gazituaga; Referee: Ekaitz García Arriola |

| 29 July 2026 5 | Racing Santander | 0–3 | Athletic Bilbao | Laredo |
| 19:00 CEST (UTC+2) | | Report | Guruzeta 9'; Sancet 78'; Louis-Jean 82' | Stadium: Campo de San Lorenzo; Referee: Mario Pacheco Cotero |

| 1 August 2026 6 | Burgos | 0–3 | Athletic Bilbao | Burgos |
| 19:00 CEST (UTC+2) | | Report | Areso 14'; Navarro 63'; Williams 84' | Stadium: El Plantío; Referee: Eder Mallo Fernández |
Note: The match lasted 120 minutes and was played in four, 30-minute halves

| 9 August 2026 7 | Marseille | 3–1 | Athletic Bilbao | Marseille, France |
| 17:30 CEST (UTC+2) | Gomes 10'; Paixão 40'; Mmadi 86' | Report | Sancet 34' | Stadium: Stade Vélodrome; Attendance: 45,000; Referee: Marc Bollengier |

| 14 August 2026 8 | Atalanta | 1–0 | Athletic Bilbao | Bergamo, Italy |
| 20:45 CEST (UTC+2) | Zalewski 46' | Report | | Stadium: Stadio di Bergamo; Referee: Abdoulaye Diop |

=== Euskal Herriko Futbol Txapelketa ===
| 2 October 2026 Final | Real Sociedad | 0–1 | Athletic Bilbao | San Sebastián |
| 19:00 CEST (UTC+2) | | Report | Sannadi 58' | Stadium: Anoeta; Attendance: 9,678; Referee: Luis Bestard |

== Competitions ==
| Competition | First match | Last match | Starting round | Final position | Record | | | | | | | |
| Competition | First match | Last match | Starting round | Final position | Pld | W | D | L | GF | GA | GD | Win % |
|---|---|---|---|---|---|---|---|---|---|---|---|---|
| La Liga | 22 August 2026 | 30 May 2027 | Matchday 1 | TBC | 12 | 4 | 4 | 4 | 15 | 12 | +3 | 33.33 |
| Copa del Rey | 29 October 2026 | TBD | First round | TBC | 1 | 1 | 0 | 0 | 0 | 0 | +0 | 100.00 |
| Total | | | | | 13 | 5 | 4 | 4 | 15 | 12 | +3 | 38.46 |

Source: Soccerway

=== La Liga ===
==== League table ====
| Pos | Team | Pld | W | D | L | GF | GA | GD | Pts | Qualification or relegation |
|---|---|---|---|---|---|---|---|---|---|---|
| 5 | Real Sociedad | 12 | 7 | 1 | 4 | 21 | 20 | +1 | 22 | Qualification for the UEFA Europa League league phase |
| 6 | Sevilla | 12 | 5 | 3 | 4 | 17 | 19 | −2 | 18 | Qualification for the UEFA Conference League play-off round |
| 7 | Athletic Bilbao | 12 | 4 | 4 | 4 | 15 | 12 | +3 | 16 | |
| 8 | Alavés | 13 | 4 | 4 | 5 | 18 | 18 | 0 | 16 | |
| 9 | Villarreal | 12 | 4 | 3 | 5 | 17 | 15 | +2 | 15 | |

Updated to match(es) played on 21 November 2026. Source: LaLiga EA Sports
Rules for classification: 1) Points; 2) Head-to-head points; 3) Head-to-head goal difference; 4) Goal difference; 5) Goals scored; 6) Fair-play points (if three or more teams tied); 7) Play-off at neutral site.
(Note: Head-to-head record is used only after all the matches between the teams in question have been played)

==== Results summary ====
| Overall | | | | | | | | Home | | | | | | Away | | | | | |
| Pld | W | D | L | GF | GA | GD | Pts | W | D | L | GF | GA | GD | W | D | L | GF | GA | GD |
|---|---|---|---|---|---|---|---|---|---|---|---|---|---|---|---|---|---|---|---|
| 13 | 4 | 4 | 5 | 15 | 13 | +2 | 16 | 3 | 2 | 3 | 11 | 7 | +4 | 1 | 2 | 2 | 4 | 6 | −2 |

Last updated: 21 November 2026.
Source: La Liga

==== Results by round ====
| Round | 2 | 1 | 3 | 4 | 5 | 7 | 9 | 6 | 10 | 11 | 12 | 13 | 8 | 14 | 15 | 16 | 17 | 18 | 19 | 20 | 21 | 22 | 23 | 24 | 25 | 26 | 27 | 28 | 29 | 30 | 31 | 32 | 33 | 34 | 35 | 36 | 37 | 38 |
|---|---|---|---|---|---|---|---|---|---|---|---|---|---|---|---|---|---|---|---|---|---|---|---|---|---|---|---|---|---|---|---|---|---|---|---|---|---|---|
| Ground | H | A | A | H | H | H | A | A | A | H | H | A | H | A | H | A | H | A | H | A | H | A | H | A | H | H | A | H | A | H | A | A | H | A | H | A | A | H |
| Result | L | L | W | W | D | D | D | L | W | W | D | L | | | | | | | | | | | | | | | | | | | | | | | | | | |
| Position | 17 | 19 | 12 | 10 | 9 | 10 | 9 | 13 | 8 | 7 | 7 | | | | | | | | | | | | | | | | | | | | | | | | | | | |

Updated to match(es) played on 1 November 2026. Source: La Liga
A = Away; H = Home; W = Win; D = Draw; L = Loss

==== Matches ====
The match schedule was released on 30 June 2026.

| 22 August 2026 2 | Athletic Bilbao | 1–3 | Sevilla | Bilbao |
| 17:00 CEST (UTC+2) | Berchiche (red card) 11'; Guruzeta (yellow card) 25'; Paredes 70'; Ruiz de Galarreta (yellow card) 86' | Report | Oso 15'; Peque (yellow card) 22'; Sierra (yellow card) 25'; Guridi (yellow card) 39'; Ejuke 50'; Romero 57', (yellow card) 90'; Guillén (yellow card) 90+3' | Stadium: San Mamés; Attendance: 49,416; Referee: César Soto Grado |

| 27 August 2026 1 | Barcelona | 2–0 | Athletic Bilbao | Barcelona |
| 21:00 CEST (UTC+2) | Espart (yellow card) 27'; Raphinha 37'; Fermín 82' | Report | Guruzeta (yellow card) 48'; Louis-Jean (yellow card) 61' | Stadium: Camp Nou; Attendance: 59,326; Referee: Miguel Ángel Ortiz Arias |
Note: The match was rescheduled due to the players' involvement in the 2026 FIFA World Cup

| 30 August 2026 3 | Celta Vigo | 0–2 | Athletic Bilbao | Vigo |
| 21:30 CEST (UTC+2) | | Report | Berenguer 20'; Navarro 22' | Stadium: Balaídos; Attendance: 20,902; Referee: Mateo Busquets Ferrer |

| 5 September 2026 4 | Athletic Bilbao | 3–0 | Atlético Madrid | Bilbao |
| 16:15 CEST (UTC+2) | N. Williams 46'; Navarro 48'; Sancet 90' | Report | | Stadium: San Mamés; Attendance: 48,425; Referee: José Luis Munuera Montero |

| 12 September 2026 5 | Athletic Bilbao | 1–1 | Elche | Bilbao |
| 18:30 CEST (UTC+2) | Chust 79' (o.g.) | Report | Buonanotte 50' (pen.) | Stadium: San Mamés; Attendance: 47,287; Referee: Manuel Jesús Orellana Cid |

| 19 September 2026 7 | Athletic Bilbao | 0–0 | Alavés | Bilbao |
| 16:15 CEST (UTC+2) | | Report | | Stadium: San Mamés; Attendance: 47,254; Referee: Víctor García Verdura |

| 10 October 2026 8 | Rayo Vallecano | Abandoned | Athletic Bilbao | Madrid |
| 14:00 CEST (UTC+2) | | Report | | Stadium: Vallecas; Referee: José María Sánchez Martínez |
Note: The match was called off by the referee in the 25th minute due to objects being thrown on the pitch by Rayo Vallecano fans

| 17 October 2026 9 | Valencia | 0–0 | Athletic Bilbao | Valencia |
| 21:00 CEST (UTC+2) | Raba (yellow card) 19'; Pepelu (yellow card) 87'; Tárrega (yellow card) 90' | | Laporte (yellow card) 38'; Gerenabarrena (yellow card) 42'; de Galarreta (yellow card) 57' | Stadium: Mestalla; Referee: Adrián Cordero Vega |

| 21 October 2026 6 | Levante | 3–1 | Athletic Bilbao | Valencia |
| 20:00 CEST (UTC+2) | Brugué 20', 22'; Etta Eyong (yellow card) 77', (goal) 90+8'; Toljan (yellow card) 80' | Report | Berenguer 67' (pen.); Laporte (red card) 73'; Berchiche (yellow card) 90+8' | Stadium: Ciutat de València; Attendance: 18,779; Referee: Alejandro Quintero González |
Note: The match was rescheduled due to adverse weather and a waterlogged pitch.

| 25 October 2026 10 | Athletic Bilbao | 4–0 | Getafe | Bilbao |
| 14:00 CET (UTC+1) | Berenguer 17'; Williams 35'; Paredes 70'; Gerenabarrena (yellow card) 72'; Berchiche 88' | Report | Terrats (yellow card) 39'; Carvajal (yellow card) 43'; Mojica (yellow card) 63'; Martín (red card) 86' | Stadium: San Mamés; Attendance: 44,160; Referee: Francisco José Hernández Maeso |

| 1 November 2026 11 | Athletic Bilbao | 2–1 | Real Sociedad | Bilbao |
| 21:00 CET (UTC+1) | Williams 14', (yellow card) 45+4'; Berenguer 45+2' (pen.); Rincón (yellow card) 84' | Report | Sučić 30'; Oyarzabal (yellow card) 55'; Sarr (yellow card) 64'; Aramburu (yellow card) 74' | Stadium: San Mamés; Attendance: 50,092; Referee: Alejandro Hernández Hernández |

| 7 November 2026 12 | Osasuna | 1–1 | Athletic Bilbao | Pamplona |
| 18:30 CET (UTC+1) | Moncayola (yellow card) 45+2'; Budimir (yellow card) 54'; Catena 90'; Muñoz (yellow card) 90+4' | Report | Williams 84'; Sancet (yellow card) 90+3' | Stadium: El Sadar; Attendance: 20,768; Referee: Miguel Sesma Espinosa |

| 20 November 2026 13 | Athletic Bilbao | 0–1 | Espanyol | Bilbao |
| 21:00 CET (UTC+1) | Williams (yellow card) 58'; de Galarreta (yellow card) 70'; Álvarez (yellow card) 83' | Report | Fernández 66'; Riedel (yellow card) 90+3' | Stadium: San Mamés; Attendance: 46,107; Referee: Mateo Busquets Ferrer |

| 29 November 2026 14 | Málaga | v | Athletic Bilbao | Málaga |
| --:-- CET (UTC+1) | | | | Stadium: La Rosaleda |

| 6 December 2026 15 | Athletic Bilbao | v | Real Madrid | Bilbao |
| --:-- CET (UTC+1) | | | | Stadium: San Mamés |

| 13 December 2026 16 | Deportivo A Coruña | v | Athletic Bilbao | A Coruña |
| --:-- CET (UTC+1) | | | | Stadium: Riazor |

| 20 December 2026 17 | Athletic Bilbao | v | Betis | Bilbao |
| --:-- CET (UTC+1) | | | | Stadium: San Mamés |

| 3 January 2027 18 | Racing Santander | v | Athletic Bilbao | Santander |
| --:-- CET (UTC+1) | | | | Stadium: El Sardinero |

| 10 January 2027 19 | Athletic Bilbao | v | Villarreal | Bilbao |
| --:-- CET (UTC+1) | | | | Stadium: San Mamés |

| 17 January 2027 20 | Getafe | v | Athletic Bilbao | Getafe |
| --:-- CET (UTC+1) | | | | Stadium: Estadio Coliseum |

| 24 January 2027 21 | Athletic Bilbao | v | Levante | Bilbao |
| --:-- CET (UTC+1) | | | | Stadium: San Mamés |

| 31 January 2027 22 | Sevilla | v | Athletic Bilbao | Seville |
| --:-- CET (UTC+1) | | | | Stadium: Ramón Sánchez-Pizjuán |

| 7 February 2027 23 | Athletic Bilbao | v | Osasuna | Bilbao |
| --:-- CET (UTC+1) | | | | Stadium: San Mamés |

| 14 February 2027 24 | Real Madrid | v | Athletic Bilbao | Madrid |
| --:-- CET (UTC+1) | | | | Stadium: Bernabéu |

| 21 February 2027 25 | Athletic Bilbao | v | Celta Vigo | Bilbao |
| --:-- CET (UTC+1) | | | | Stadium: San Mamés |

| 28 February 2027 26 | Athletic Bilbao | v | Barcelona | Bilbao |
| --:-- CET (UTC+1) | | | | Stadium: San Mamés |

| 7 March 2027 27 | Alavés | v | Athletic Bilbao | Vitoria-Gasteiz |
| --:-- CET (UTC+1) | | | | Stadium: Mendizorrotza |

| 14 March 2027 28 | Athletic Bilbao | v | Valencia | Bilbao |
| --:-- CET (UTC+1) | | | | Stadium: San Mamés |

| 21 March 2027 29 | Espanyol | v | Athletic Bilbao | Cornellà de Llobregat |
| --:-- CET (UTC+1) | | | | Stadium: Estadi Cornellà-El Prat |

| 4 April 2027 30 | Athletic Bilbao | v | Racing Santander | Bilbao |
| --:-- CEST (UTC+2) | | | | Stadium: San Mamés |

=== Copa del Rey ===
Athletic entered the tournament in the first round.

| 29 October 2026 First round | Prat | 1–6 | Athletic Bilbao | L'Hospitalet (Note: Prat did not play the match in their main stadium Sagnier, El Prat, as it did not meet the broadcasting requirements.) |
| 21:00 CET (UTC+1) | Reinke 33' | Report | Sannadi 29'; Navarro 31'; Serrano 36'; Vizcay 84'; Imga 87'; Sánchez 88' | Stadium: Municipal de L'Hospitalet; Referee: Carlos Muñiz Muñoz |

== Statistics ==
| No. | Pos | Nat | Player | Total | | La Liga | | Copa del Rey | |
| No. | Pos | Nat | Player | Apps | Goals | Apps | Goals | Apps | Goals |
Goalkeepers
| 1 | GK | (Spain) ESP | Unai Simón | 0 | 0 | 0 | 0 | 0 | 0 |
| 13 | GK | (Mexico) MEX | Alex Padilla | 0 | 0 | 0 | 0 | 0 | 0 |
| 26 | GK | (Spain) ESP | Mikel Santos | 0 | 0 | 0 | 0 | 0 | 0 |
Defenders
| 3 | DF | (Spain) ESP | Daniel Vivian | 0 | 0 | 0 | 0 | 0 | 0 |
| 4 | DF | (Spain) ESP | Aitor Paredes | 0 | 0 | 0 | 0 | 0 | 0 |
| 5 | DF | (Spain) ESP | Yeray Álvarez | 0 | 0 | 0 | 0 | 0 | 0 |
| 12 | DF | (Spain) ESP | Jesús Areso | 0 | 0 | 0 | 0 | 0 | 0 |
| 14 | DF | (Spain) ESP | Aymeric Laporte | 0 | 0 | 0 | 0 | 0 | 0 |
| 15 | DF | (Spain) ESP | Hugo Rincón | 0 | 0 | 0 | 0 | 0 | 0 |
| 17 | DF | (Spain) ESP | Yuri Berchiche | 0 | 0 | 0 | 0 | 0 | 0 |
| 30 | DF | (Spain) ESP | Iker Monreal | 0 | 0 | 0 | 0 | 0 | 0 |
| 31 | DF | (France) FRA | Johaneko Louis-Jean | 0 | 0 | 0 | 0 | 0 | 0 |
| — | DF | (Spain) ESP | Unai Egiluz | 0 | 0 | 0 | 0 | 0 | 0 |
Midfielders
| 6 | MF | (Spain) ESP | Beñat Prados | 0 | 0 | 0 | 0 | 0 | 0 |
| 8 | MF | (Spain) ESP | Oihan Sancet | 0 | 1 | 0 | 1 | 0 | 0 |
| 16 | MF | (Spain) ESP | Iñigo Ruiz de Galarreta | 0 | 0 | 0 | 0 | 0 | 0 |
| 18 | MF | (Spain) ESP | Mikel Jauregizar | 0 | 0 | 0 | 0 | 0 | 0 |
| 20 | MF | (Spain) ESP | Alejandro Rego | 0 | 0 | 0 | 0 | 0 | 0 |
| 24 | MF | (Spain) ESP | Beñat Gerenabarrena | 0 | 0 | 0 | 0 | 0 | 0 |
| 28 | MF | (Spain) ESP | Peio Canales | 0 | 0 | 0 | 0 | 0 | 0 |
| 44 | MF | (Spain) ESP | Selton Sánchez | 0 | 0 | 0 | 0 | 0 | 0 |
Forwards
| 7 | FW | (Spain) ESP | Álex Berenguer | 0 | 2 | 0 | 2 | 0 | 0 |
| 9 | FW | (Ghana) GHA | Iñaki Williams | 0 | 0 | 0 | 0 | 0 | 0 |
| 10 | FW | (Spain) ESP | Nico Williams | 0 | 1 | 0 | 1 | 0 | 0 |
| 11 | FW | (Spain) ESP | Gorka Guruzeta | 0 | 0 | 0 | 0 | 0 | 0 |
| 21 | FW | (Morocco) MAR | Maroan Sannadi | 0 | 0 | 0 | 0 | 0 | 0 |
| 22 | FW | (Spain) ESP | Nico Serrano | 0 | 0 | 0 | 0 | 0 | 0 |
| 23 | FW | (Spain) ESP | Robert Navarro | 0 | 2 | 0 | 2 | 0 | 0 |
| 25 | FW | (Guinea-Bissau) GBS | Álvaro Djaló | 0 | 0 | 0 | 0 | 0 | 0 |
| 29 | FW | (Spain) ESP | Asier Hierro | 0 | 0 | 0 | 0 | 0 | 0 |
Players who have made an appearance this season but have left the club
