= Johaneko Louis-Jean =

French footballer (born 2004)

Personal information
- Date of birth: 28 June 2004 (age 22)
- Place of birth: Bayonne, France
- Height: 1.75 m (5 ft 9 in)
- Position: Right-back

Team information
- Current team: Athletic Bilbao
- Number: 31

Youth career
- 2010–2014: Labenne OSC
- 2014–2019: Bayonne
- 2019–2022: Bordeaux

Senior career*
| Years | Team | Apps | (Gls) |
| 2022–2024 | Bordeaux B | 26 | (3) |
| 2022–2024 | Bordeaux | 9 | (0) |
| 2023–2024 | → Lugo (loan) | 20 | (0) |
| 2024– | Bilbao Athletic | 50 | (0) |
| 2026– | Athletic Bilbao | 7 | (0) |

International career^{‡}
| 2021–2022 | France U18 | 10 | (0) |
| 2022 | France U19 | 2 | (0) |
| 2026– | Basque Country | 1 | (0) |
Medal record
Men's football
Representing France
Mediterranean Games
| Gold medal – first place | 2022 Oran | Team |
- * Club domestic league appearances and goals as of 21 October 2026 ‡ National team caps and goals as of 14 November 2026

Johaneko Louis-Jean (born 28 June 2004) is a French professional footballer who plays as a right-back or left-back for Spanish club Athletic Bilbao.

== Club career ==
On 2 January 2022, Louis-Jean made his professional debut for Bordeaux in a 3–0 Coupe de France loss to Brest. After a loan spell in Spain with CD Lugo, in August 2024 he signed for Athletic Bilbao in the wake of the cancellation of his contract as Bordeaux collapsed economically.

After two years with the reserve team, he trained with the senior squad ahead of the 2026–27 season and made his La Liga debut on 27 August 2026, starting at left-back in place of the suspended Yuri Berchiche against FC Barcelona at Camp Nou; the outcome was a 2–0 defeat, but Johaneko drew praise for his efforts against FIFA World Cup-winning winger Lamine Yamal despite receiving a yellow card for stopping his opponent and eventually having to be substituted due to exhaustion. He became only the third player born in France to play an official match for Athletic (after Bixente Lizarazu and Aymeric Laporte).

== International career ==
Louis-Jean has represented France at under-18 level.

== Personal life ==
Born in Bayonne, in the French Basque Country, Louis-Jean is of Basque and Martiniquais descent.

== Career statistics ==
As of match played 21 October 2026

Appearances and goals by club, season and competition
| Club | Season | League | | | Cup | | Europe | | Other | | Total | |
| Club | Season | Division | Apps | Goals | Apps | Goals | Apps | Goals | Apps | Goals | Apps | Goals |
|---|---|---|---|---|---|---|---|---|---|---|---|---|
| Bordeaux B | 2021–22 | CFA 1 | 10 | 0 | — | | — | | — | | 10 | 0 |
| Bordeaux B | 2022–23 | CFA 1 | 15 | 3 | — | | — | | — | | 15 | 3 |
| Bordeaux B | 2023–24 | CFA 1 | 1 | 0 | — | | — | | — | | 1 | 0 |
| Bordeaux B | Total | | 26 | 3 | — | | — | | — | | 26 | 3 |
| Bordeaux | 2021–22 | Ligue 1 | 1 | 0 | — | | — | | — | | 1 | 0 |
| Bordeaux | 2022–23 | Ligue 2 | 8 | 0 | — | | — | | — | | 8 | 0 |
| Bordeaux | Total | | 9 | 0 | — | | — | | — | | 9 | 0 |
| Lugo (loan) | 2023–24 | Primera Federación | 20 | 0 | 3 | 0 | — | | — | | 23 | 0 |
| Bilbao Athletic | 2024–25 | Primera Federación | 29 | 0 | — | | — | | 2 (Note: Appearances in Premier League International Cup) | 0 | 31 | 0 |
| Bilbao Athletic | 2025–26 | Primera Federación | 21 | 0 | — | | — | | — | | 21 | 0 |
| Bilbao Athletic | Total | | 50 | 0 | — | | — | | — | | 50 | 0 |
| Athletic Bilbao | 2026–27 | La Liga | 7 | 0 | 0 | 0 | — | | — | | 7 | 0 |
| Career total | | | 112 | 3 | 3 | 0 | 0 | 0 | 2 | 0 | 117 | 3 |

== Honours ==
France U18

- Mediterranean Games: 2022
