= Beñat Gerenabarrena =

Spanish footballer

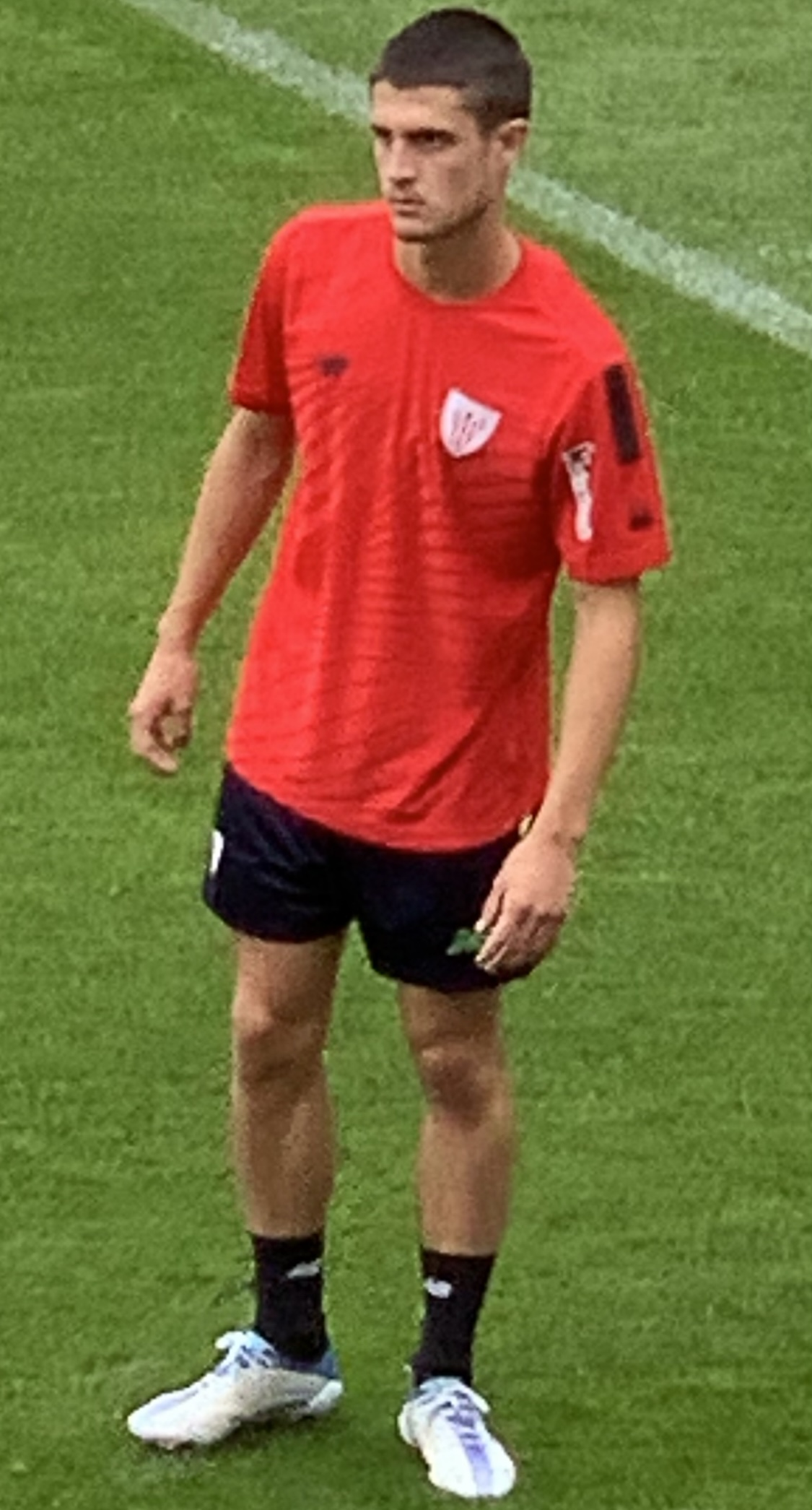
- Gerenabarrena in 2022

Personal information
- Full name: Beñat Gerenabarrena Zendoia
- Date of birth: 29 March 2003 (age 23)
- Place of birth: Lekeitio, Spain
- Height: 1.73 m (5 ft 8 in)
- Position: Midfielder

Team information
- Current team: Athletic Bilbao
- Number: 24

Youth career
- Aurrerá Ondarroa
- 2015–2021: Athletic Bilbao

Senior career*
Years	Team	Apps	(Gls)
2021–2022	Basconia	18	(5)
2022–	Bilbao Athletic	106	(2)
2025–2026	→ Castellón (loan)	37	(2)
2026–	Athletic Bilbao	7	(0)
- * Club domestic league appearances and goals as of 25 October 2026

Beñat Gerenabarrena Zendoia (born 29 March 2003) is a Spanish footballer who plays as a midfielder for Athletic Bilbao.

== Career ==
Born in Lekeitio (Biscay, Basque Country), Gerenabarrena joined Athletic Bilbao's youth sides in 2015, from CD Aurrerá Ondarroa. Promoted to farm team CD Basconia in Tercera División RFEF ahead of the 2021–22 season, he made his senior debut on 5 September 2021, starting in a 0–0 away draw against Barakaldo CF; he soon scored his first senior goal on 15 September, netting Basconia's last-minute equalizer in a 2–2 draw at CD Anaitasuna. He first appeared with the reserves on 9 January of the following year, starting in a 1–1 Primera División RFEF away draw against CD Calahorra.

On 17 December 2022, after establishing himself as a regular starter for the B-team, Gerenabarrena featured with the main squad in a friendly against Udinese Calcio. On 17 April 2024, having helped the reserves return to the third division, he renewed his contract with the club until 2027.

On 19 June 2025, Gerenabarrena was loaned to Segunda División side CD Castellón, for one year. He made his professional debut on 16 August, starting in a 3–1 away loss to Racing de Santander.

After a strong season as a regular starter for Castellón as they challenged for promotion to the top tier (losing narrowly to UD Almería in the play-offs), Gerenabarrena returned to Athletic Bilbao for the 2026–27 pre-season and was confirmed as a senior squad member, being assigned jersey number 24; he made his La Liga debut at San Mamés on 22 August 2026, featuring from the start as Athletic lost 3–1 to Sevilla FC (he was not directly responsible for any of the goals conceded and his performance alongside Peio Canales drew praise).

== Career statistics ==
As of match played 25 October 2026

Appearances and goals by club, season and competition
Club	Season	League			Cup		Europe		Other		Total	
Club	Season	Division	Apps	Goals	Apps	Goals	Apps	Goals	Apps	Goals	Apps	Goals
Basconia	2021–22	Segunda Federación	18	5	0	0	—		0	0	18	5
Bilbao Athletic	2021–22	Primera Federación	16	0	—		—		—		16	0
Bilbao Athletic	2022–23	Primera Federación	35	1	—		—		—		35	1
Bilbao Athletic	2023–24	Segunda Federación	26	1	—		—		1 (Note: Appearance in Premier League Cup)	0	27	1
Bilbao Athletic	2024–25	Segunda Federación	29	0	—		—		1	0	30	0
Bilbao Athletic	Total		106	2	—		—		2	0	108	2
Castellón (loan)	2025–26	Segunda División	37	2	0	0	—		2 (Note: Appearances in La Liga play-offs)	0	39	2
Athletic Bilbao	2026–27	La Liga	7	0	0	0	—		—		7	0
Career total			168	9	0	0	0	0	4	0	172	9
