= Christian Imga =

Spanish footballer (born 2009)

Personal information
- Full name: Christian Imga Mitogo
- Date of birth: 17 February 2009 (age 17)
- Place of birth: Zumarraga, Spain
- Height: 1.90 m (6 ft 3 in)
- Position: Winger

Team information
- Current team: Athletic Bilbao
- Number: 33

Youth career
- 2022–2025: Deportivo Alavés
- 2025–2026: Athletic Bilbao

Senior career*
Years	Team	Apps	(Gls)
2026–	Bilbao Athletic	4	(1)
2026–	Athletic Bilbao	1	(0)

International career^{‡}
2025–	Spain U17	14	(5)
2026–	Spain U18	6	(1)
- * Club domestic league appearances and goals as of 25 October 2026 ‡ National team caps and goals as of 3 October 2026

Christian Imga Mitogo (born 17 February 2009) is a Spanish professional footballer who plays as a winger for Athletic Bilbao.

== Early life ==
Born in 2009 in Zumarraga (Gipuzkoa, Basque Country), Imga is of Cameroonian descent through his father while his mother has Equatoguinean origins.

== Club career ==
As a youth player, Imga joined the youth academy of Deportivo Alavés in 2022. Following his stint there, he joined the academy of La Liga side Athletic Bilbao midway through the 2024–25 season – he had agreed to move clubs at the end of the season as a free agent, but was allowed to leave Alavés early as they no longer wished to involve him at Juvenil level due to his decision to leave; however, having featured for them that season, regulations meant he could not also play for Athletic at that level, only for the younger Cadete age group.

== International career ==
Imga is a Spain youth international. During the autumn of 2025 and the spring of 2026, he played for the Spain national under-17 football team for 2026 UEFA European Under-17 Championship qualification.

== Style of play ==
Imga plays as a winger. Spanish newspaper El Correo wrote in 2025 that he is "a diamond in the rough, combining a formidable physique - he's 1.90 meters tall—with exceptional skill to play on either wing. He's fast, powerful, unpredictable, and capable of finishing with both feet".

== Career statistics ==
As of match played 25 October 2026

Appearances and goals by club, season and competition
Club	Season	League			Cup		Europe		Other		Total	
Club	Season	Division	Apps	Goals	Apps	Goals	Apps	Goals	Apps	Goals	Apps	Goals
Bilbao Athletic	2026–27	Primera Federación	4	1	—		—		—		4	1
Athletic Bilbao	2026–27	La Liga	1	0	0	0	—		—		1	0
Career total			5	1	0	0	0	0	0	0	5	1
