= Txus Vizcay =

Spanish footballer (born 2005)

Personal information
- Full name: Jesús Vizcay Hurtado
- Date of birth: 5 August 2005 (age 21)
- Place of birth: Huarte, Spain
- Height: 1.86 m (6 ft 1 in)
- Position: Forward

Team information
- Current team: Athletic Bilbao
- Number: 34

Youth career
- 2015–2020: Oberena
- 2020–2023: Athletic Bilbao

Senior career*
Years	Team	Apps	(Gls)
2023–2025	Basconia	33	(15)
2025–	Bilbao Athletic	15	(4)
2026	→ Arenas Getxo (loan)	18	(6)
2025–	Athletic Bilbao	1	(0)
- * Club domestic league appearances and goals as of 25 October 2026

Jesús "Txus" Vizcay Hurtado (born 5 August 2005) is a Spanish professional footballer who plays as a forward for Athletic Bilbao.

== Career ==
Born in Huarte, Navarre, Vizcay joined Athletic Bilbao's Lezama Facilities in May 2020, from CD Oberena. Promoted to the farm team CD Basconia for the 2023–24 season, he spent the most of the campaign sidelined due to injuries in his knee.

Back to full fitness, Vizcay helped Basconia to achieve promotion to Segunda Federación before being promoted to the reserves in Primera Federación in 2025. Rarely used, he moved to fellow third division side Arenas Club de Getxo on 8 January 2026.

Back to Athletic in July 2026, Vizcay subsequently established himself as a starter for the B-team, and made his first team – and La Liga – debut on 25 October, coming on as a late substitute for Iñaki Williams in a 4–0 home routing of Getafe CF.
