= Selton Sánchez =

Spanish footballer (born 2007)

Personal information
- Full name: Selton Sued Sánchez Camilo
- Date of birth: 20 February 2007 (age 19)
- Place of birth: Durango, Spain
- Height: 1.85 m (6 ft 1 in)
- Position: Midfielder

Team information
- Current team: Athletic Bilbao
- Number: 44

Youth career
- Abaroa-San Miguel
- 2017–2025: Athletic Bilbao

Senior career*
Years	Team	Apps	(Gls)
2024–2025	Basconia	18	(1)
2025–	Bilbao Athletic	13	(0)
2025–	Athletic Bilbao	7	(0)

International career
2026–	Spain U19	2	(0)
- * Club domestic league appearances and goals as of 3 October 2026

Selton Sued Sánchez Camilo (Durango, Spain, 20 February 2007), sometimes known as just Selton, is a Spanish professional footballer who plays as a midfielder for Athletic Bilbao.

== Club career ==
Selton came through the youth academy at Athletic Bilbao, joining the club at the age of ten. He featured in the 2025–26 UEFA Youth League and as a senior in the fourth and fifth tiers for CD Basconia (Athletic's farm team) prior to his debut for third-level reserve team Bilbao Athletic in October 2025 at the age of 18.

He was soon called into the first team squad for the Basque derby fixture against Real Sociedad in La Liga on 1 November, but remained an unused substitute. He made his professional debut for Athletic Bilbao on 5 November 2025 in the UEFA Champions League against Newcastle United, appearing as a second-half substitute in a 2–0 defeat at St James' Park. Asier Hierro also made his debut, and after the match they were congratulated by the travelling members of the Youth League squad of which Selton had been a member only a few weeks earlier.

On 8 February 2026, he gave his first professional assist to Nico Serrano in the victory (4-2) against Levante UD at San Mames.

== International career ==
Selton was called up to the Spain under-18 national team from December 2024, without playing any official matches, before being called up to Spain U19. On 17 February 2026, he made his debut as a starter in the victory against Norway, where he made his mark in several plays of the match.

== Personal life ==
Born in Durango, Spain in 2007, he has Brazilian heritage through his mother, and is the cousin of Brazilian international footballer Roberto Firmino.

== Career statistics ==
As of match played 7 March 2026

Appearances and goals by club, season and competition
Club	Season	League			Cup		Europe		Other		Total	
Club	Season	Division	Apps	Goals	Apps	Goals	Apps	Goals	Apps	Goals	Apps	Goals
Basconia	2024–25	Tercera Federación	14	1	—		—		—		14	1
Basconia	2025–26	Segunda Federación	4	0	—		—		—		4	0
Bilbao Athletic	2025–26	Primera Federación	2	0	—		—		—		2	0
Athletic Bilbao	2025–26	La Liga	7	0	2	0	3 (Note: Appearances in UEFA Champions League)	0	1 (Note: Appearance in Supercopa de España)	0	13	0
Career total			27	1	2	0	3	0	1	0	33	1
