= Iker Monreal =

Spanish footballer (born 2005)

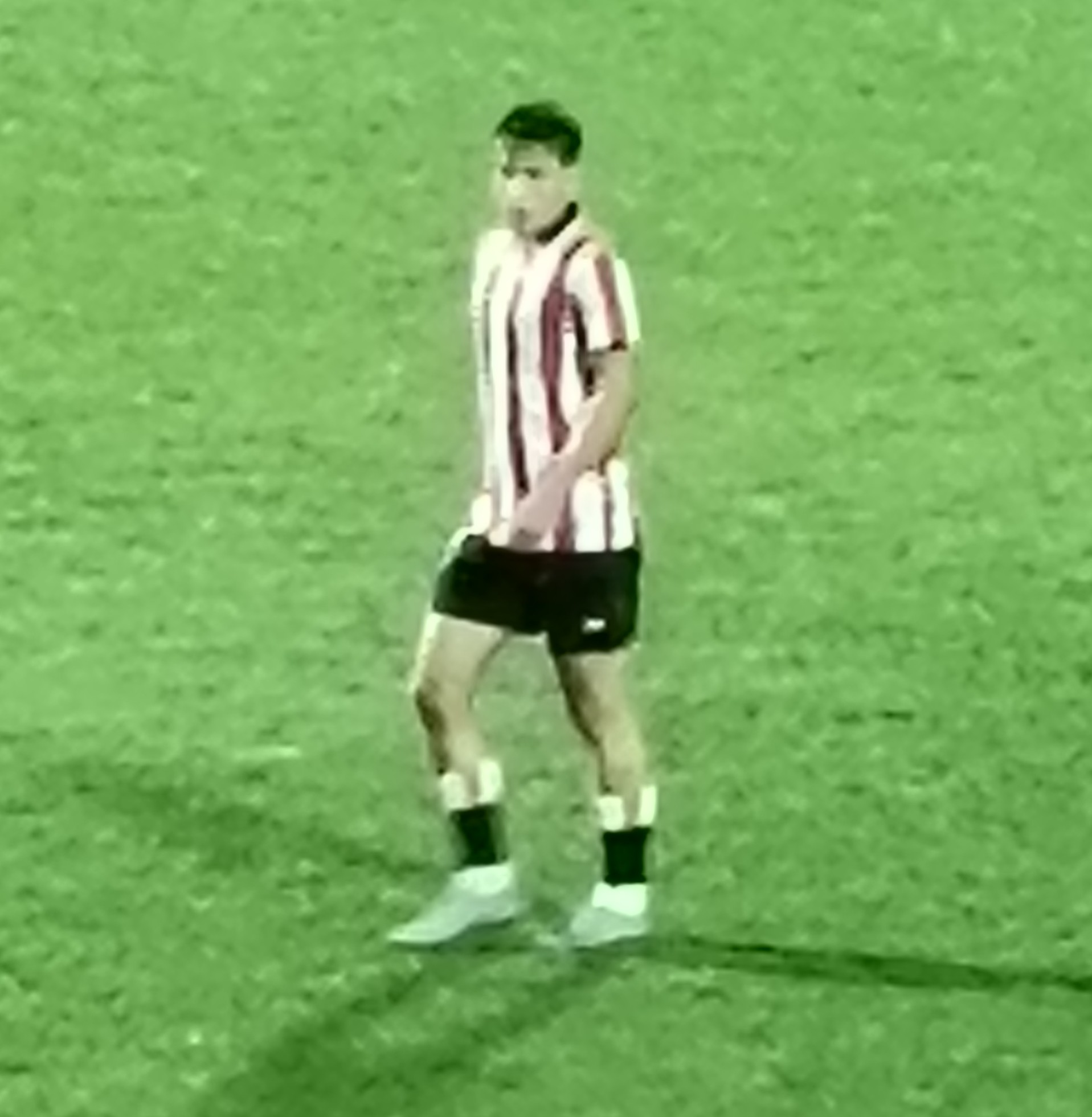
- Monreal playing for Bilbao Athletic in 2025

Personal information
- Full name: Iker Monreal Agundez
- Date of birth: 3 July 2005 (age 21)
- Place of birth: Pamplona, Spain
- Height: 1.85 m (6 ft 1 in)
- Position: Centre-back

Team information
- Current team: Athletic Bilbao
- Number: 49

Youth career
- Ardoi

Senior career*
Years	Team	Apps	(Gls)
2022–2023	Ardoi B		
2022–2024	Ardoi	40	(0)
2024–2025	Basconia	25	(2)
2024–	Bilbao Athletic	27	(1)
2026–	Athletic Bilbao	0	(0)
- * Club domestic league appearances and goals as of 27 May 2026

Iker Monreal Agundez (born 3 July 2005) is a Spanish footballer who plays as a centre-back for Athletic Bilbao.

== Career ==
Born in Pamplona, Navarre, Monreal began his career with local side CF Ardoi FE, making his senior debut with the B-team in the regional leagues before appearing with the main squad in Tercera Federación. He quickly established himself as a starter, and impressed with the side during the 2023–24 season, which led to interest from CA Osasuna and Athletic Bilbao.

In May 2024, Monreal agreed to a deal with Athletic, being initially assigned to farm team CD Basconia also in the fifth division. He helped the side to achieve promotion to Segunda Federación, while also featuring with the reserves in a few matches during the campaign.

After establishing himself as a regular starter in the B-team, Monreal made his first team debut on 4 February 2026, starting in a 2–1 away win over Valencia CF, for the season's Copa del Rey.
