= Asier Hierro =

Spanish footballer (born 2005)

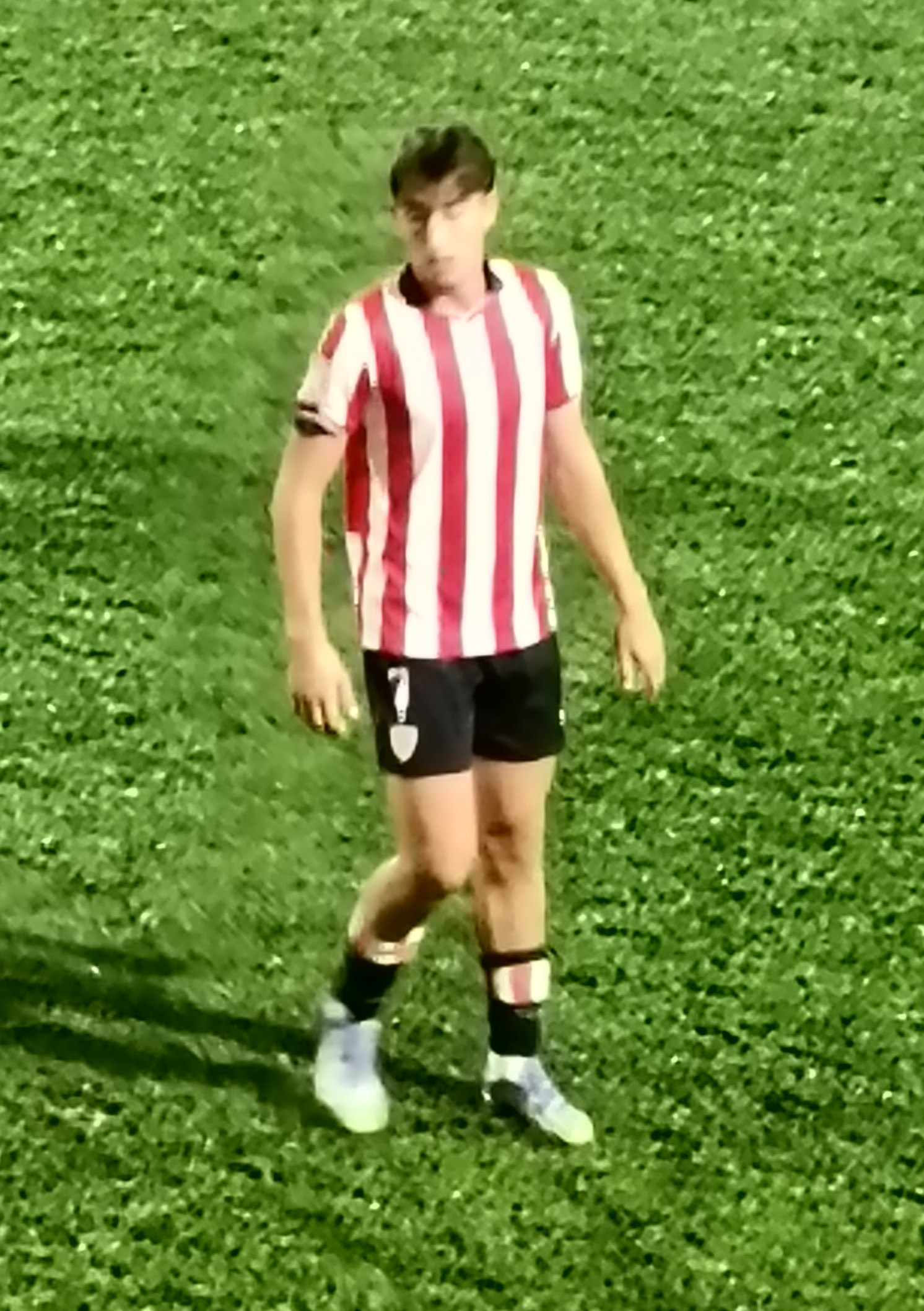
- Hierro playing for Bilbao Athletic in 2025

Personal information
- Full name: Asier Hierro Campo
- Date of birth: 6 May 2005 (age 21)
- Place of birth: Basauri, Spain
- Height: 1.90 m (6 ft 3 in)
- Position: Forward

Team information
- Current team: Bilbao Athletic
- Number: 9

Youth career
- Basconia
- 2015–2023: Athletic Bilbao

Senior career*
Years	Team	Apps	(Gls)
2023–2024	Basconia	30	(12)
2023–	Bilbao Athletic	63	(6)
2025–	Athletic Bilbao	1	(0)
- * Club domestic league appearances and goals as of 27 May 2026

Asier Hierro Campo (born 6 May 2005) is a Spanish professional footballer who plays as a forward for Bilbao Athletic.

== Career ==
From Basauri in Biscay, Basque Country, Hierro joined the Athletic Bilbao youth academy at the age of ten. He scored 12 goals for CD Basconia (Athletic's farm team, based in his hometown and where he had first learned the game) in the 2023–24 season. Having been promoted to the reserve team, in November 2024 he signed a new multi-year contract with the club.

Hierro made his professional debut for Athletic Bilbao on 5 November 2025 in the UEFA Champions League against Newcastle United, appearing as a second-half substitute in a 2–0 defeat at St James' Park. With fellow youth team product Selton Sánchez also making his senior debut in the match, afterwards they were congratulated by the members of the club's UEFA Youth League squad who had also travelled to Tyneside.

== Career statistics ==
As of match played 28 January 2026

Appearances and goals by club, season and competition
Club	Season	League			Cup		Europe		Other		Total	
Club	Season	Division	Apps	Goals	Apps	Goals	Apps	Goals	Apps	Goals	Apps	Goals
Basconia	2023–24	Tercera Federación	30	12	—		—		2 (Note: 2024 Segunda Federación play-offs)	0	32	12
Bilbao Athletic	2023–24	Segunda Federación	2	1	—		—		—		2	1
Bilbao Athletic	2024–25	Segunda Federación	31	2	—		—		2 (Note: Appearances in Premier League Cup)	1	33	3
Bilbao Athletic	2025–26	Segunda Federación	16	3	—		—		1	1	17	4
Bilbao Athletic	Total		49	6	—		—		3	2	52	8
Athletic Bilbao	2025–26	La Liga	1	0	0	0	3 (Note: Appearances in UEFA Champions League)	0	0	0	4	0
Career total			82	18	0	0	3	0	5	2	90	20
