= Athletic Bilbao =

Spanish football club

Athletic Club
- Full name: Athletic Club
- Nicknames: Lehoiak (The Lions); Zuri-Gorriak (The Red-and-Whites)
- Founded: 18 July 1898; 128 years ago
- Stadium: Estadio San Mamés
- Capacity: 53,289
- Coordinates: 43°15′51.0″N 2°56′57.7″W
- President: Jon Uriarte
- Head coach: Edin Terzić
- League: La Liga
- 2025–26: La Liga, 12th of 20
- Website: athletic-club.eus
Home colours	Away colours	Third colours

Athletic Club (Basque: Athletic Kluba; Spanish: Athletic Club), commonly known as Athletic Bilbao (Spanish: Athletic de Bilbao), or simply Athletic, is a professional football club based in the city of Bilbao, Spain. They are known as Lehoiak (The Lions) because their stadium was built near a church called San Mamés, which was named after Saint Mammes, an early Christian thrown to the lions by the Romans. The team plays its home matches at the San Mamés Stadium. Its home colours are red and white striped shirts with black shorts.

Athletic are the fourth most successful club in La Liga with eight titles to their name. In the table of Copa del Rey titles, Athletic is second only to Barcelona, having won it 24 times. (Note: The number of Copa del Rey wins Athletic Club have been credited with is disputed. The 1902 Copa de la Coronación was won by Club Bizcaya, a team made up of players from Athletic Club and Bilbao FC. In 1903 these two clubs merged as Athletic Club and took part in the first official Copa del Rey in 1903. The 1902 trophy is on display in the Athletic museum and the club includes it in its own honours list for a total of 25 Copas; however, the LFP and RFEF official statistics do not regard this as an official edition of the Copa del Rey won by Athletic.) It is also the most successful Basque football club in both league and cup titles won. The club also has one of the most successful women's teams in Spain, which has won five championships in the Primera División Femenina.

The club is one of three founding members of the Primera División that have never been relegated from the top division since its inception in 1929, the others being Real Madrid and Barcelona. These three clubs, along with Osasuna, are the only four professional clubs in Spain that are not sports corporations; this means that the club is owned by its members, who elect the president. The president cannot invest his own money. Athletic's main rivals are Real Sociedad, against whom it contests the Basque derby, and Real Madrid, due to sporting and political identity; a minor rivalry also exists with Barcelona due to historical significance. At various points in the club's history, further Basque league derbies have been contested against Alavés, Eibar and Osasuna.

The club is known for its cantera policy of bringing young Basque players through the ranks, as well as recruiting players from other Basque clubs. Athletic's official policy is to sign players native to or trained in football in the greater Basque Country, which includes Biscay, Gipuzkoa, Álava and Navarre (in Spain), as well as Labourd, Soule and Lower Navarre (in France). Since 1911, Athletic has played exclusively with players meeting its own criteria to be deemed Basque. The club has been praised for promoting home grown players and club loyalty. The rule does not apply to coaching staff, with several examples of non-Basques head coach both from Spain and abroad having coached the first team.

Despite the implications of the name 'Athletic Club' in English, and unlike some of the other major Spanish teams which have several departments, it is not a multi-sport club, participating only in football, although sections for cycling and other sports existed prior to the Spanish Civil War in the 1930s.

== History ==
=== Bilbao FC, Athletic Club, and Club Bizcaya ===
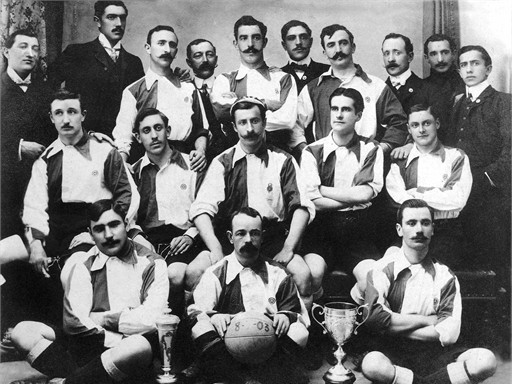
Athletic Club with the first Copa del Rey, in 1903, with Juan de Astorquia in the center

Football was introduced to Bilbao by two distinct groups with British connections: British workers and Basque students returning from schools in Britain. In the late 19th century, Bilbao was a leading industrial town, thus becoming the home to a large British colony, mainly made up of migrant workers, including shipyard workers and miners from various areas of England, such as Southampton, Portsmouth, and Sunderland. Along with coal, they brought with them (as in so many other parts of the world) the game of football. Meanwhile, sons of the Basque educated classes, such as Juan Astorquia, went to Britain to complete their studies, and while there they developed a deep interest in football. When they returned, they began to organize games with British workers at the Hippodrome of Lamiako, which at the time was the home of organized football in Biscay.

In 1898, Juan Astorquia and six other Basque students belonging to the Gymnasium Zamacois began to practice football in Lamiako. Three years later, in 1901, at a meeting held at the Café García, this group of football pioneers, now larger, began conversations to become a legalized official football club, which they called Athletic Club, using the English spelling. Luis Márquez became the club's first president, while Astorquia and Alfred Mills (the club's only foreign-born founder) were named the team's captain and vice-captain, but in 1902, Astorquia replaced Márquez as president, ruling from 1902 until 1903. Under his presidency, Athletic and their city rivals Bilbao Football Club reached an agreement to combine the best players of both sides to form a team known as Club Bizcaya, which was created to compete in the 1902 Copa de la Coronación (forerunner of the Copa del Rey which officially began a year later) held in Madrid; Bizcaya returned to Bilbao with the trophy after beating Joan Gamper's FC Barcelona 2–1 in the final. On 24 March 1903, Bilbao FC and its associates were officially and definitively absorbed by Athletic Club. The club itself declares 1898 as its foundation date.

=== Pichichi and Copa del Rey ===
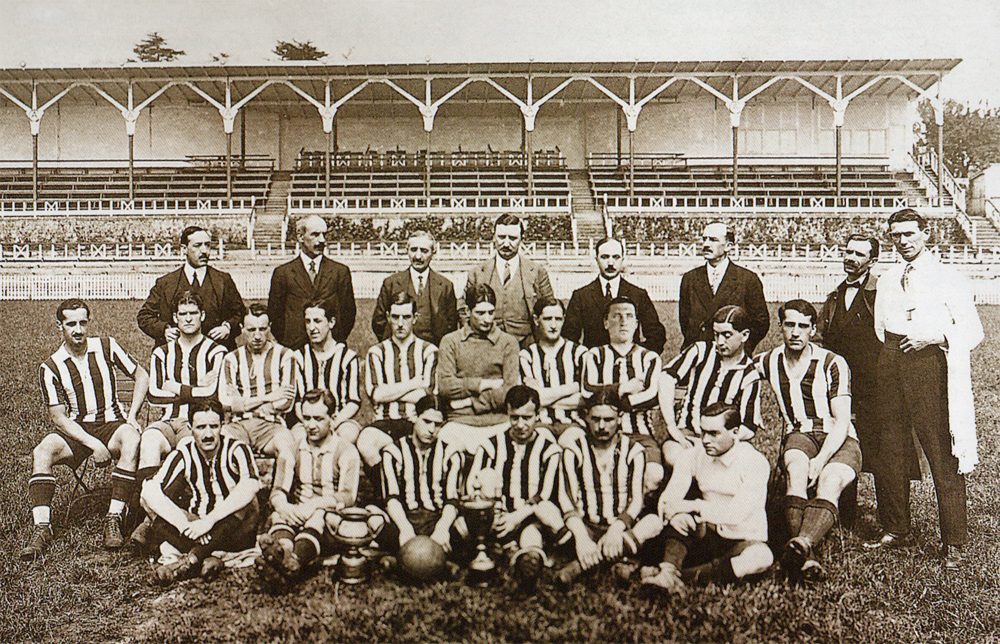
Athletic Club champion team in 1915 along with the 1914 and 1915 Copa del Rey trophies.

The club featured prominently in early Copas del Rey. Following their triumph at the Copa de la Coronación by Club Bizcaya, Athletic won their first Copa del Rey in 1903. After watching the final in the Spanish capital that year, Basque students also formed an affiliated team, Athletic Club Madrid, which later evolved into Atlético Madrid. In 1904, holders Athletic were declared winners of the trophy after their opponents failed to turn up. In 1907, they revived the name Club Vizcaya after entering a combined team with La Union and were beaten in the Copa final. After a brief lull, they won again in 1910, with Luis Astorquia as the new captain and goalkeeper.

In 1911, former team captain Alejandro de la Sota, was elected as the 7th president of the club, and he was the driving force behind the construction of the San Mamés Stadium (architect Manuel María Smith), which opened in 1913 and soon became one of the symbols of Athletic's dominance in the 1910s, winning the Copa del Rey three times in a row between 1914 and 1916, with Billy Barnes as coach. Between 1917 and 1919, the club went through a period of institutional crisis and during that time did not participate in the Copa del Rey, having failed to win the regional tournament that acted as the qualifier. In 1920, with the return of Billy Barnes, Athletic once again participated in the national championship and in 1921 won the Copa del Rey again.

The star of this team was Pichichi, a prolific goalscorer who scored the first goal at the San Mamés on 21 August 1913 and a hat-trick in the 1915 final. The last championship won by Pichichi was the 1921 Copa del Rey, before his death aged just 29 in 1922. Today, the La Liga top-scorer is declared the Pichichi in his honour.

=== Fred Pentland and the first historic attack ===
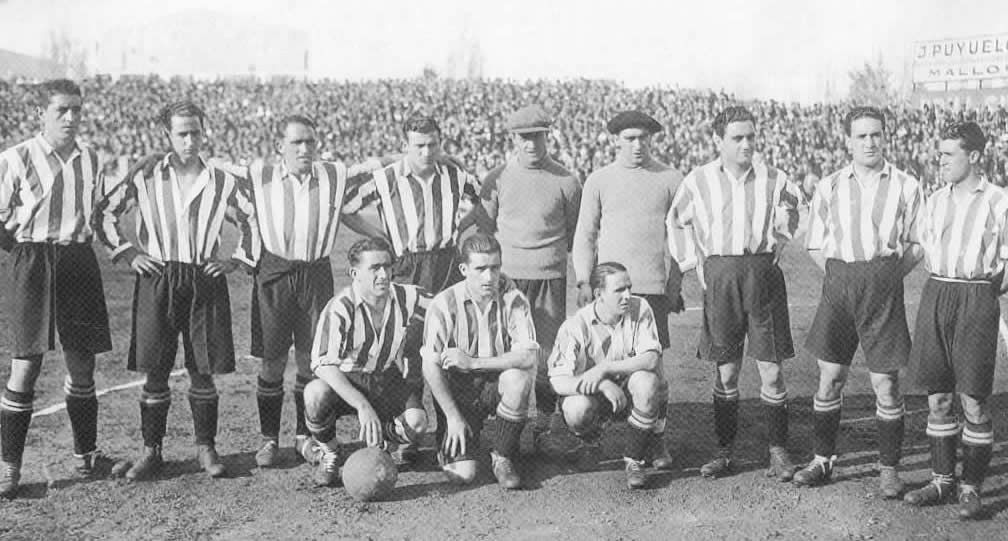
In the 1930s, Athletic Bilbao won four leagues and four cups in just six years. In the image, the 1930–31 La Liga winning team.

Along with fellow Basque clubs such as Real Unión, Arenas Club de Getxo and Real Sociedad, Athletic was a founding member of La Liga in 1928 and by 1930 they were joined by CD Alavés; five of the ten clubs in the Primera División were from the Basque Country. The saying "Con cantera y afición, no hace falta importación" (en: "With home-grown teams and support, there is no need for import"), made sense during these early days.

In 1922, a new English coach, Fred Pentland, arrived; in 1923, he led the club to victory in the Copa del Rey. He revolutionised the way Athletic played, favouring the short-passing game. In 1927, Pentland left Athletic but returned in 1929 and led the club to La Liga/Copa del Rey doubles in 1930 and 1931. The club won the Copa del Rey four times in a row between 1930 and 1933 and they were also La Liga runners-up in 1932 and 1933. In 1931, Athletic defeated Barcelona 12–1, the latter's worst defeat and the biggest win in LaLiga history.

Athletic's success under English coaches continued with William Garbutt. His first season in Spain was a massive success as he managed to win the Liga that year. He had inherited a talented squad that included one of the best strikers in the club's history, known as Primera delantera histórica (en: First historic attack), formed by Lafuente, José Iraragorri, Bata (top scorer of LaLiga in 1930–31), Chirri II and Guillermo Gorostiza (top scorer of LaLiga in 1929-30 and 1931–32). Goalkeeper Gregorio Blasco also stood out, who was the most unbeaten goalie in LaLiga on three occasions.

Garbutt promoted the young Ángel Zubieta to the first team, a player who at 17 years of age became the youngest ever to play for Spain at the time. In the final game of the season, the title was decided when Athletic defeated Oviedo 2–0 at home on 19 April 1936, winning the title two points ahead of Real Madrid. In July 1936, football halted due to the outbreak of the Spanish Civil War. The league did not restart until the 1939–40 season. Athletic Club did not win the title again until 1943 and by that time Garbutt had been exiled.

=== Telmo Zarra and the second historic attack ===
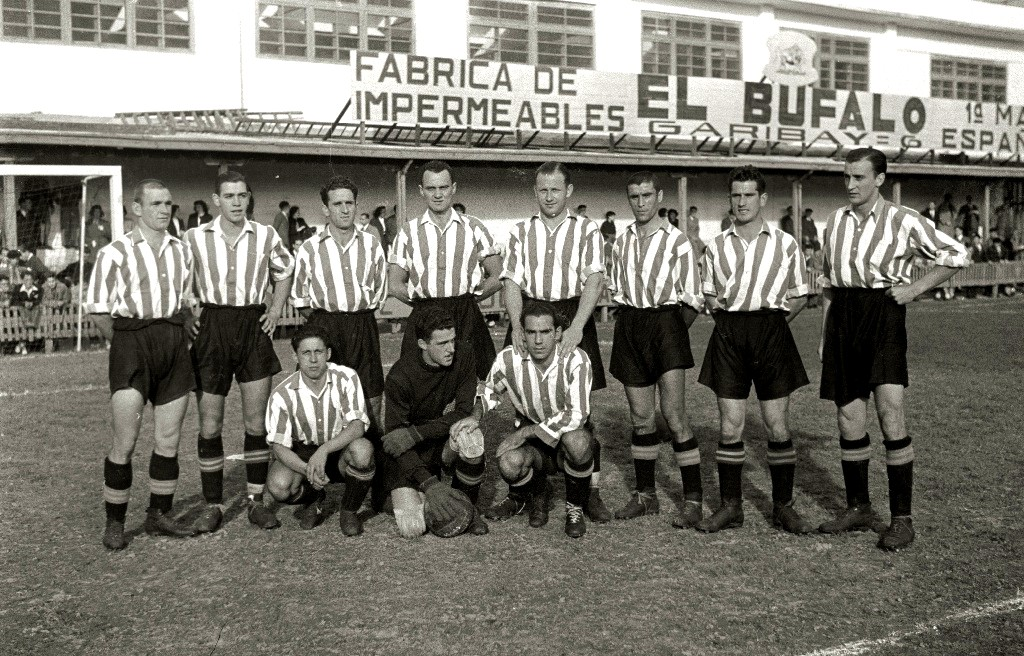
Atlético Bilbao team winner of a La Liga title and three consecutive Copa del Rey titles in 1943, 1944 and 1945.

In 1941, the club was forced to change its name to Atlético Bilbao, following a decree issued by Franco, who also changed the name of the Copa del Rey to Copa del Generalísimo, in reference to his own figure.

After the civil war, the club had to rebuild the team almost from scratch, as only seven players from the team before the conflict remained: some who had shown themselves in favour of Basque nationalism or the Spanish republic went into exile in Latin America, and others were rejected for fear of reprisals. In the late 1930s and early 1940s, Athletic focused on the young promises of the Basque teams to rebuild the team. In this way, it managed to create a competitive team that quickly became champions.

During the 1940s and early 1950s, the club featured the legendary forward line formed by Rafa Iriondo, Francisco Gárate, Telmo Zarra, José Luis Panizo and Agustín Gaínza, which was nicknamed Segunda delantera histórica (en: Second historic attack); midfielder Nando González and goalkeeper Raimundo Lezama (most unbeaten goalie in LaLiga on 1946-47) also stood out from this team. This squad, coached by Juan Urkizu, won a double in 1943 and retained Copa del Generalísimo in both 1944 and 1945. Years later, Venancio Pérez replaced Garate in the forward line and José Iraragorri took over the bench. They helped the club win another Copa del Generalísimo and a Copa Eva Duarte (the official precedent of the Supercopa de España) in 1950.

The big star of this team was Telmo Zarra, who became one of the club's great legends and the top scorer in its history with 335 goals. He won six Pichichi Trophies for being the top scorer in LaLiga (a record only surpassed by Messi in 2020), and his 38 goals in the 1950–51 season stood as a record for 60 years. He was also the top scorer in LaLiga history since 1950 with 251 goals until in 2014 he was surpassed by Lionel Messi and later by Cristiano Ronaldo (however, he is still the top Spanish scorer in the championship). In 1997, the King of Spain Juan Carlos I awarded him the gold medal to Royal Order of Sports Merit.

=== The team of eleven villagers ===
Atlético Bilbao league performance 1929-present.

In 1954, coach Ferdinand Daučík retired the team of second historic attack and gave way to a new generation of players. Daučík managed to form a new champion team that won the double in 1956 and two other victories in the Copa del Generalísimo in 1955 and 1958. The latter is remembered as one of the club's most important achievements because Athletic managed to beat Di Stefano's Real Madrid, which had just won the European Cup and LaLiga, and the Spanish federation also ignored Athletic's request to play in a neutral field and forced the final to be played in Chamartin (Real Madrid stadium). However, the Bilbao team won the match 2–0 with goals from Arieta and Mauri, and lifted the Cup in Chamartin Stadium. From that moment on, this was remembered as el equipo de los once aldeanos (en: the team of eleven villagers), since club president Enrique Guzmán shouted during the title celebration: "With eleven villagers, we have beaten them!", in allusion to the club's tradition of playing only with players from its homeland. The classic team lineup was: Carmelo; Orue, Garay, Canito; Mauri, Maguregui, Markaida; Arteche, Arieta (whom they considered Zarra's successor), Uribe and Gaínza. Thanks to their league title triumph, the team represented Spain in the 1956 Latin Cup, where they reached the final and lost to AC Milan by a score of 3–1.

In the same year the club also made their debut in the European Cup, where they reached the quarterfinals after eliminating FC Porto and Ferenc Puskás's Honvéd FC. They then beat Manchester United Busby Babes 5–3 at San Mamés Stadium, but were defeated 3–0 at Maine Road, (Note: The match was played at Maine Road because Old Trafford was undergoing construction.) in a match in which goalkeeper Carmelo had to play almost the entire match injured because substitutions did not exist at that time.

=== Iribar and the first UEFA final ===
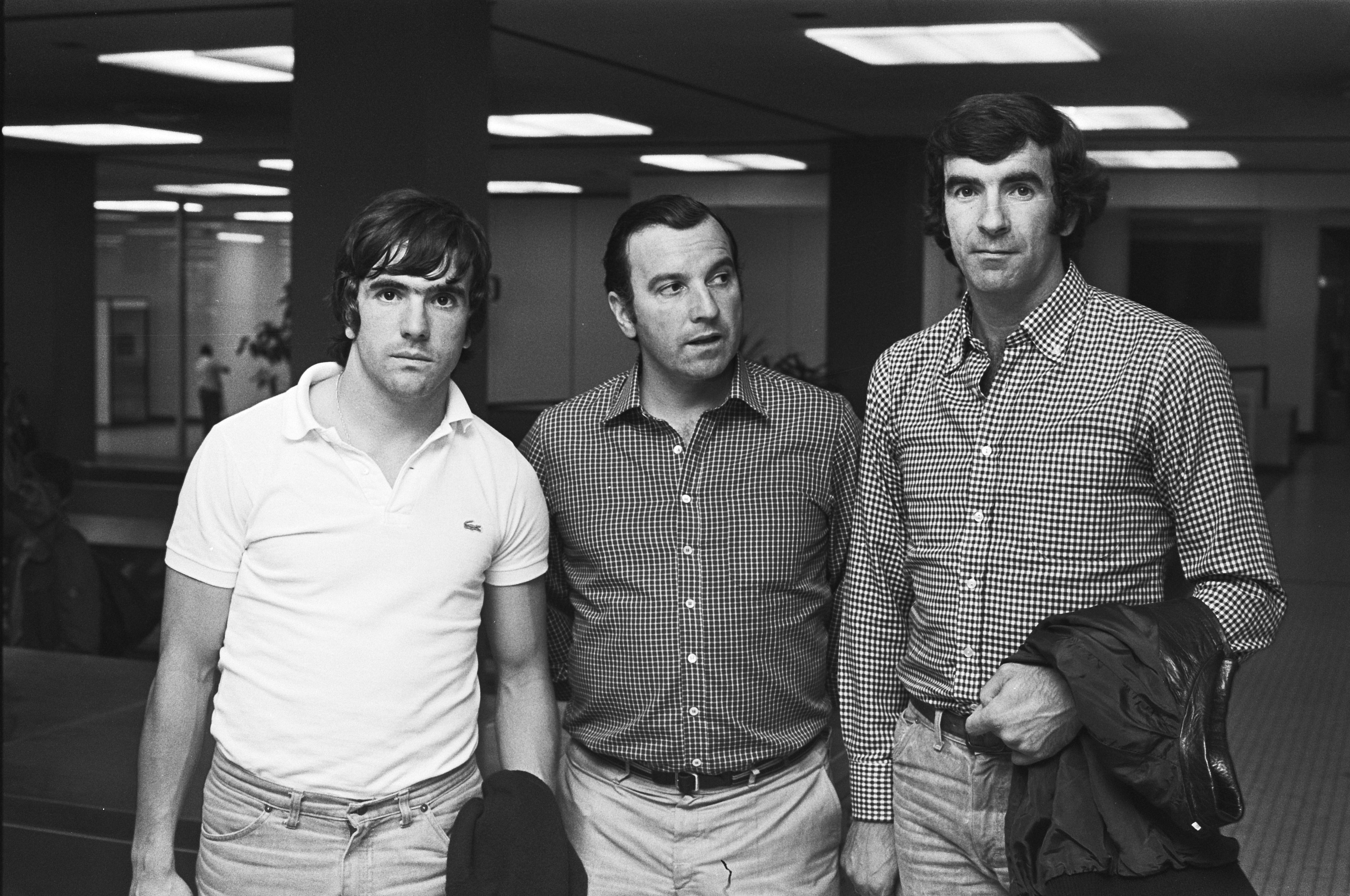
Dani, coach Koldo Aguirre and Iribar in 1978.

The 1960s were dominated by Real Madrid, and Atlético went through a few years of transition in which the only figure that shone was goalkeeper José Ángel Iribar, who became one of the club's greatest legends along with Zarra. Due to the team's bad form, the fans used to constantly repeat the phrase Juegan Iribar y diez más (en: Iribar and ten more are playing). The situation improved when in 1969 Atlético won a Copa del Generalísimo and was runner-up in LaLiga in the 1969–70 season. The main stars of this team −in addition to Iribar− were the scorer Fidel Uriarte (winner of a Pichichi Trophy) and the winger Txetxu Rojo.

The 1970s were not much better, with only another single Copa del Generalísimo win in 1973. In December 1976, before a game against Real Sociedad, Iribar and Sociedad captain Inaxio Kortabarria carried out the Ikurriña (the Basque nationalist flag), and placed it ceremonially on the centre-circle – this was the first public display of the flag since the death of Francisco Franco. By then the Franco regime had also ended and the club reverted to using the name Athletic. In 1977, the club reached the final of the UEFA Cup after eliminating teams like AC Milan or FC Barcelona, among others, and only losing on away goals to Juventus. They also reached the Copa del Rey final, which they lost to Real Betis on penalties (Iribar missed the decisive one, which gave the Sevillians the victory), and reached third position in LaLiga. Despite these defeats, this is remembered as one of the best teams in the history of Athletic Bilbao, which included historical players of the club such as Iribar, Rojo, Guisasola, Alexanko, Goikoetxea, Irureta, Dani or Carlos (last player to win the Pichichi Trophy with the club).

=== La Liga and Copa del Rey winners with Clemente ===
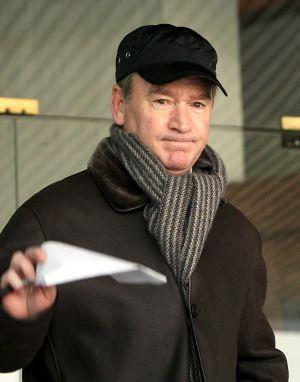
Coach Javier Clemente.

In 1981, Javier Clemente became manager. He put together one of the most successful teams in the club's history, the main lineup of this team was: Zubizarreta; Urkiaga, Goikoetxea, Rocky Liceranzu, De la Fuente; De Andrés, Sola, Urtubi; Dani, Sarabia and Argote. In 1982–83 season, Athletic became LaLiga champion after surpassing Santillana's Real Madrid in the standings on the last round. The following year they won a LaLiga and Copa del Rey double. In that cup final they beat Maradona's FC Barcelona 1–0; the Argentine player did not take the defeat well and attacked an Athletic player, which caused a brawl between both teams. Months earlier, Goikoetxea had injured Maradona after a hard tackle from behind, from which it took him several weeks to recover, and the Bilbao native was sanctioned with 17 games without playing (although the match referee did not show him any card for this fact).

In 1985 and 1986, Athletic finished third and fourth respectively. During the 1985–86 season, Clemente was fired due to a bad relationship with the team's star, Sarabia. A succession of coaches that included José Ángel Iribar, Howard Kendall, Jupp Heynckes and Javier Irureta and even a returning Clemente failed to reproduce his success.

=== The Fernández era ===
In 1998, coach Luis Fernández led the club to second in La Liga and UEFA Champions League qualification. Fernández benefited from the club adopting a more flexible approach to the cantera. In 1995, Athletic had signed Joseba Etxeberria from regional rivals Real Sociedad, causing considerable bad feelings between the two clubs. Etxeberria was a prominent member of the 1997–98 squad, along with Ismael Urzaiz and Julen Guerrero.

=== 21st century ===
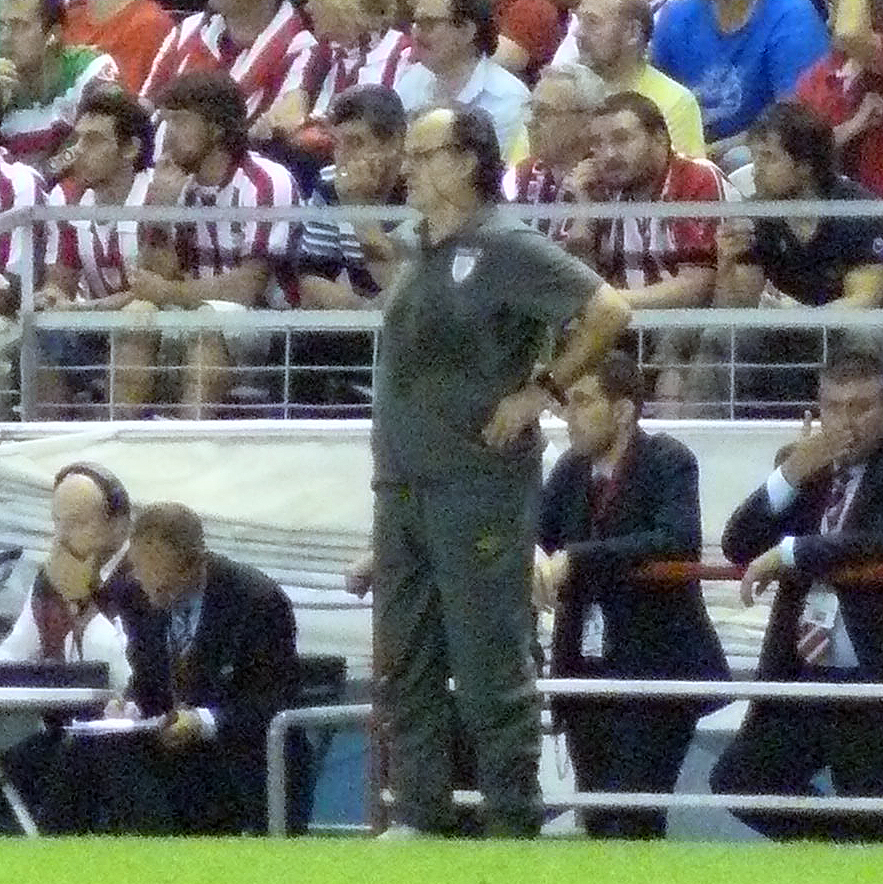
Marcelo Bielsa led Athletic Bilbao to its second European final.

The club narrowly avoided relegation during the 2005–06 and 2006–07 seasons, the latter being the worst in the club's history. In the Copa del Rey, they reached their first final in 24 years, losing 4–1 to Barcelona.

Prior to the 2011–12 season, Athletic's new president, former player Josu Urrutia, brought in coach Marcelo Bielsa; Athletic advanced to their first European final since 1977, losing 3–0 to fellow Spanish club Atlético Madrid on 9 May in the 2012 UEFA Europa League Final at the Arena Națională in Bucharest. They also reached the 2012 Copa del Rey Final, losing again to Barcelona.

After star midfielder Javi Martínez moved to FC Bayern Munich, Athletic were eliminated from the 2012–13 Europa League group stage, and were knocked out of the Copa del Rey by Basque club Eibar of the third tier. Relegation was a threat until the end of the season, and the final league game at the "old" San Mamés ended in defeat. Athletic would soon move to a new stadium, albeit in a partially completed state. Bielsa promoted young defender Aymeric Laporte into the side, while striker Fernando Llorente completed a free transfer to Juventus.

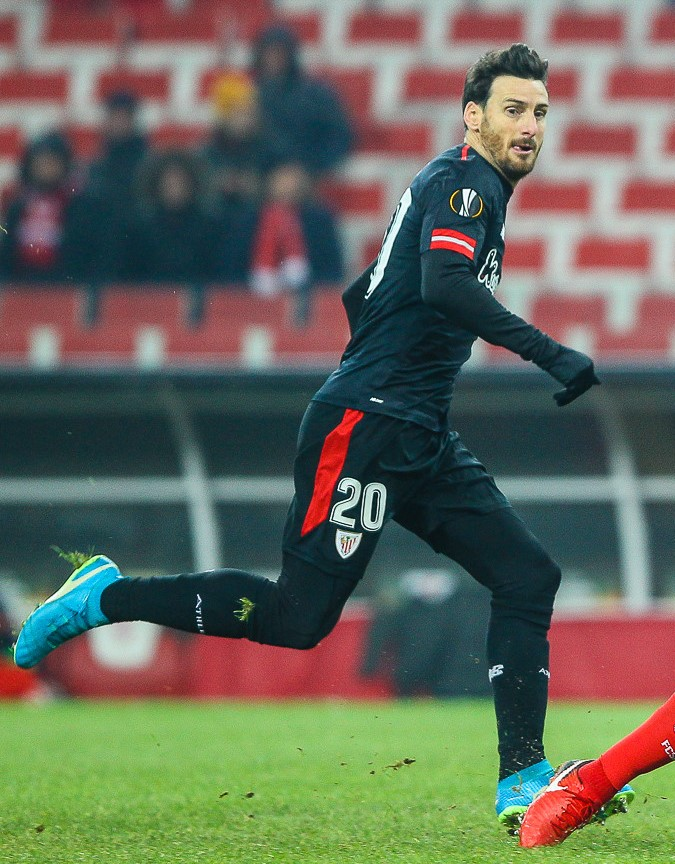
Aritz Aduriz became one of the top scorers in the club's history with 172 goals.

After Bielsa, Ernesto Valverde returned for a second spell as manager, and he signed or brought through several new players as Athletic came fourth in the league, meaning a UEFA Champions League campaign. Ander Herrera transferred to Manchester United for €36 million deal at the end of the season.

Athletic had a triumphant first full-capacity match in the new San Mamés as they defeated Napoli to qualify for the Champions League group stage, however they could only finish 3rd in the group. Athletic reached the 2015 Copa del Rey Final, but once again lost to Barcelona, 3–1.

In the first leg of the 2015 Supercopa de España at San Mamés, Athletic defeated Barcelona 4–0, with Aritz Aduriz scoring a hat-trick. In the return leg at Camp Nou, Athletic hung on with a 1–1 draw to win their first trophy since 1984. Aduriz finished with 36 goals in all competitions. Athletic advanced to the quarter-finals in the Europa League where they were only defeated on penalties by the holders and eventual repeat winners Sevilla FC.

Valverde left his position at the end of the 2016–17 season after four years. It was confirmed that his successor would be former player José Ángel Ziganda, moving up from Bilbao Athletic. On 29 November the club suffered a shock defeat to SD Formentera in the domestic cup. At the conclusion of a poor season overall, Ziganda was dismissed and Eduardo Berizzo was appointed. However, his spell was even less fruitful and in December 2018, having won just two of his fifteen matches at the helm and with the team in the relegation zone, Berizzo was dismissed. B-team coach Gaizka Garitano took over and oversaw an improvement in results, with the club moving well out of danger and narrowly missing out on a Europa League spot on the last day.

Celebration of the 2024 Copa del Rey victory

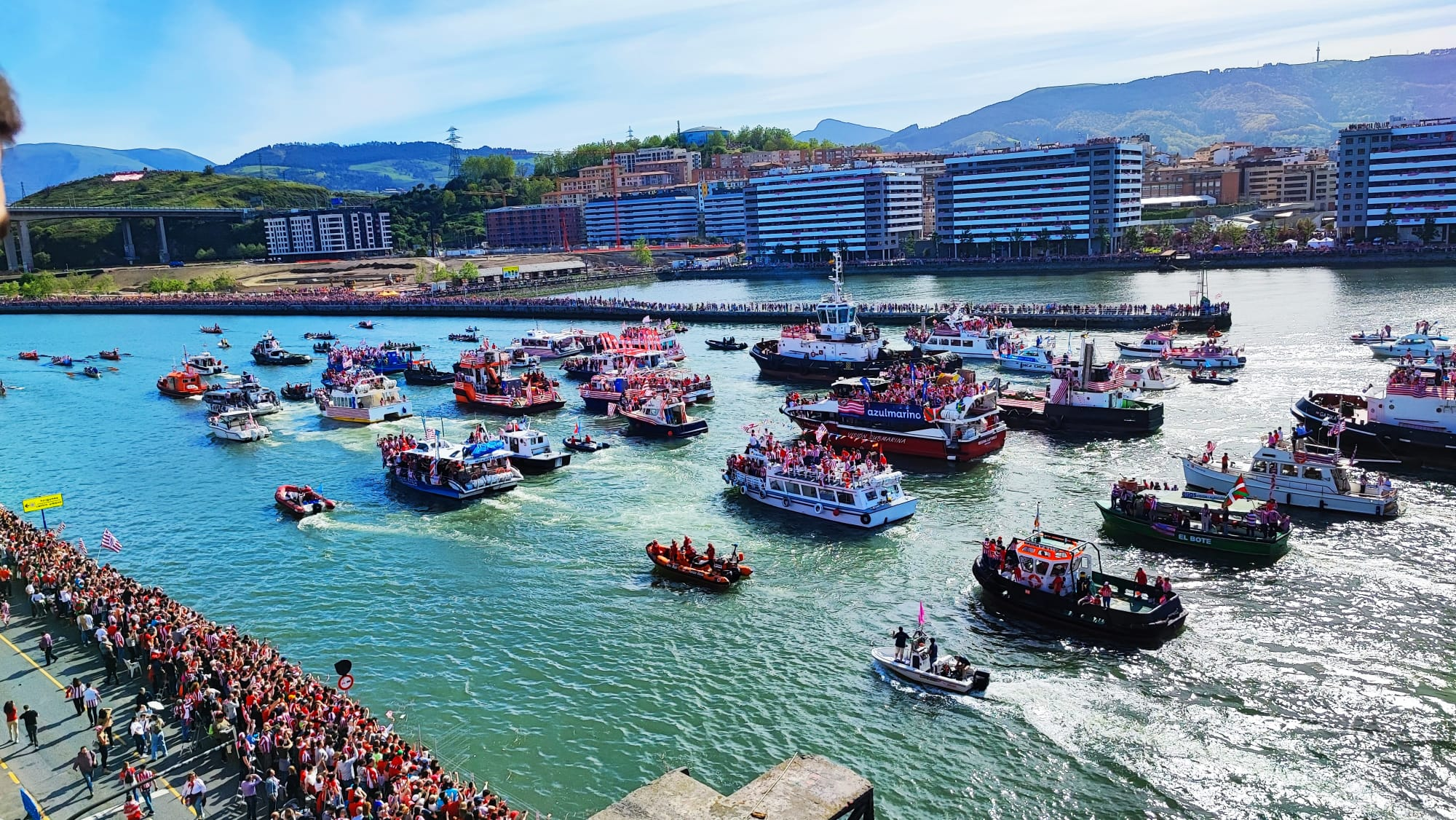
Fans and private boats surround the Athletic Bilbao traditional barge.

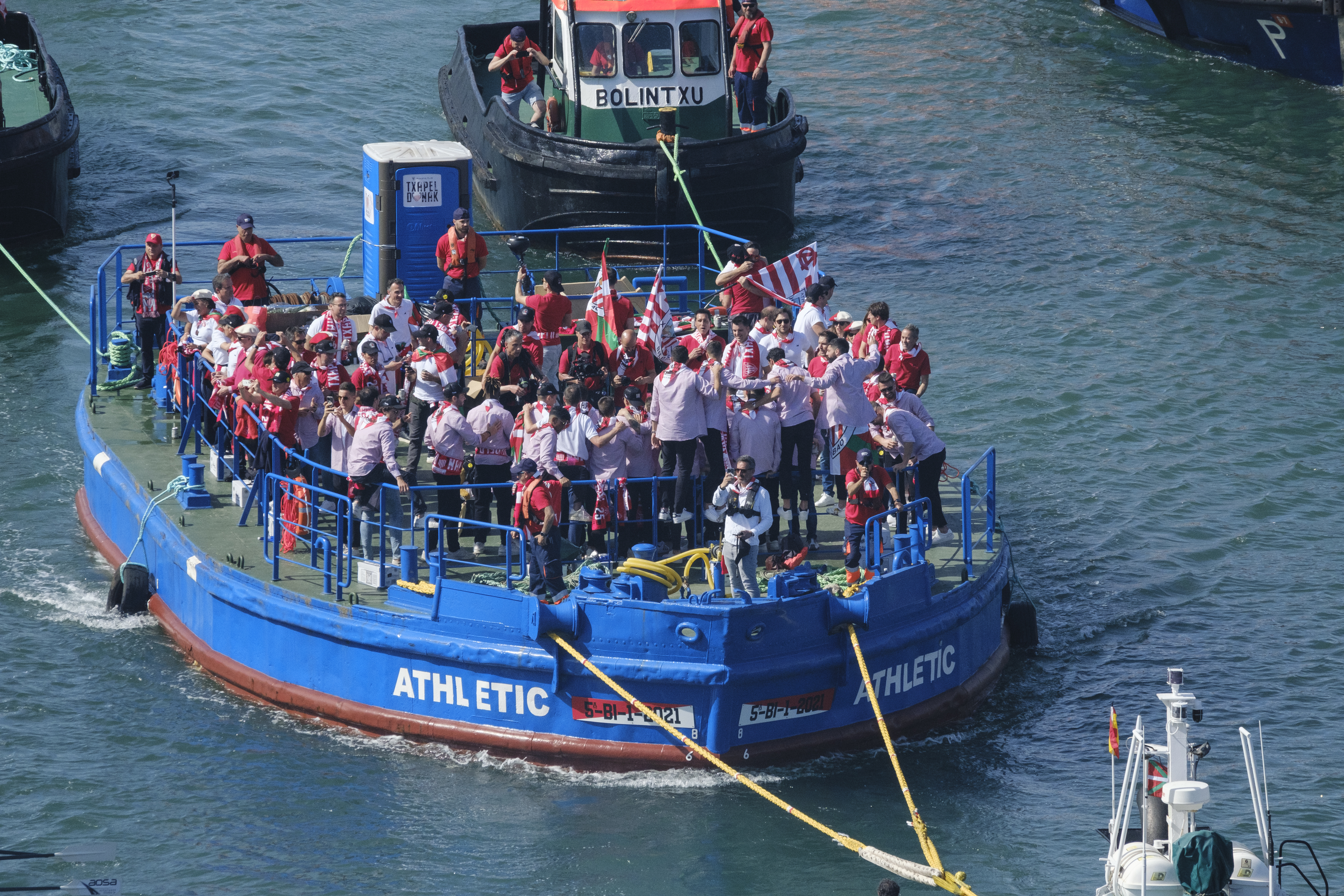
Athletic Bilbao players riding the traditional barge.

The beginning of the 2019–20 season saw more consistent results. After the first five games of the season, the Lions sat at the top of the table, their best start in 26 years. That form could not be maintained, and by the halfway point they had slipped to mid-table after several draws. However, in the Copa del Rey, they survived two penalty shootouts against second-tier opponents and then defeated Barcelona to reach the semi-finals. The club then defeated Granada CF in the semi-final on away goals to meet local rivals Real Sociedad in the final – which was then postponed due to the COVID-19 pandemic in Spain, both clubs happy to delay in the hope of supporters being able to attend the historic Basque derby occasion. This did not come to pass, and the final was eventually played in an empty stadium on 3 April 2021, Real Sociedad emerging winners by a 1–0 scoreline. By that time, Aduriz had finally retired from playing, Garitano had been replaced as coach by Marcelino, and the 2020–21 Supercopa de España originally intended to follow the delayed cup final was contested, Athletic defeating Real Madrid then Barcelona to claim the trophy. They also defeated Levante in the semi-final of the 2020–21 Copa del Rey to reach the final on 17 April 2021, making them the only team to take part in the showpiece event twice in as many weeks; however, Athletic lost that final as well, to Barcelona by a 4–0 scoreline. In October 2021, a report from the International Centre for Sports Studies (CIES) showed that Athletic Bilbao and Desna Chernihiv (Ukraine) were the only teams in European continental competitions without foreign players.They ended the season on 10th place.

The next two seasons saw the same results, narrowly missing out on the Europa Conference League by finishing in 8th and consecutive Copa del Rey Semi final exits although they did finish as Supercopa de Espanã Runners-up in the 2021–22 season, defeating Atlético Madrid and losing to Real Madrid. In the 2023–24 season however, saw Athletic Bilbao end their 40-year Copa del Rey drought by winning the 2023-24 Copa del Rey against RCD Mallorca 4–2 on penalties after a 1–1 draw in normal time and extra time. The campaign included some memorable victories, including a 4–2 win against Barcelona at home and a 4–0 aggregate win over Atlético Madrid.

== Players ==
=== Current squad ===
As of 17 November 2026

Note: Flags indicate national team as defined under FIFA eligibility rules; some limited exceptions apply. Players may hold more than one non-FIFA nationality.

No.	Pos.	Nation	Player
1	GK	ESP	Unai Simón
3	DF	ESP	Dani Vivian
4	DF	ESP	Aitor Paredes
5	DF	ESP	Yeray Álvarez
6	MF	ESP	Beñat Prados
7	FW	ESP	Álex Berenguer
8	MF	ESP	Oihan Sancet
9	FW	GHA	Iñaki Williams (captain)
10	FW	ESP	Nico Williams
11	FW	ESP	Gorka Guruzeta
12	DF	ESP	Jesús Areso
13	GK	MEX	Álex Padilla
14	DF	ESP	Aymeric Laporte
15	DF	ESP	Hugo Rincón
16	MF	ESP	Iñigo Ruiz de Galarreta
17	DF	ESP	Yuri Berchiche (vice-captain)
18	MF	ESP	Mikel Jauregizar
20	MF	ESP	Alejandro Rego
21	FW	MAR	Maroan Sannadi
22	FW	ESP	Nico Serrano
23	FW	ESP	Robert Navarro

No.	Pos.	Nation	Player
24	MF	ESP	Beñat Gerenabarrena
25	FW	GBS	Álvaro Djaló
26	GK	ESP	Mikel Santos
27	DF	ESP	Unai Egiluz
28	MF	ESP	Peio Canales
29	FW	ESP	Asier Hierro
30	DF	ESP	Iker Monreal
31	DF	FRA	Johaneko Louis-Jean
32	DF	ESP	Luciano Mendiguren
33	FW	ESP	Christian Imga
34	FW	ESP	Txus Vizcay
35	FW	ESP	Aritz Conde
36	FW	ESP	Gaizka Supernova
37	FW	ESP	Gorka Casanova
38	DF	ESP	Andoni Emegara
39	DF	ESP	Ander Douglas
40	GK	ESP	Íñigo Lafuente
41	GK	ESP	Íñaki Fontás
42	MF	ESP	Ibai Estebaranz
43	MF	ESP	Aingeru Aguirregomezcorta
44	MF	ESP	Selton Sánchez

=== Reserve team ===
Note: Flags indicate national team as defined under FIFA eligibility rules; some limited exceptions apply. Players may hold more than one non-FIFA nationality.

No.	Pos.	Nation	Player
26	GK	ESP	Mikel Santos
29	FW	ESP	Asier Hierro

No.	Pos.	Nation	Player
30	DF	ESP	Iker Monreal
44	MF	ESP	Selton Sánchez

=== Out on loan ===
Note: Flags indicate national team as defined under FIFA eligibility rules; some limited exceptions apply. Players may hold more than one non-FIFA nationality.

No.	Pos.	Nation	Player
—	DF	ESP	Adama Boiro (at West Ham United until 30 June 2027)
—	DF	ESP	Andoni Gorosabel (at Espanyol until 30 June 2027)
—	MF	ESP	Eder García (at Córdoba until 30 June 2027)

No.	Pos.	Nation	Player
—	FW	ESP	Aingeru Olabarrieta (at Eldense until 30 June 2027)
—	FW	ESP	Elijah Gift (at Eibar until 30 June 2027)
—	FW	ESP	Ibai Sanz (at Córdoba until 30 June 2027)

== Coaching staff ==
Position	Name
Head coach	(Germany) Edin Terzić
Assistant coach	(Bulgaria) Peter Gaydarov
Fitness coach	(Spain) David Casamichana
Strength specialist	(Spain) Manu Crespo
Set-piece specialist	(England) Andrew Hughes
Assistant coach & analyst	(Germany) Sebastian Geppert
Analyst	(Spain) Óscar de Marcos
Goalkeeping coach	(Spain) Aitor Iru
Translator	(Spain) Álex Albístegui
Nurse	(Spain) Juan Manuel Ipiña (Spain) Álvaro Campa
Physiotherapist	(Spain) Isusko Ortuzar (Spain) Imanol Martín
Sports therapist	(Spain) Xabier Clemente
Match delegate	(Spain) Sendoa Agirre
Equipment manager	(Spain) Jon Escalza (Spain) Iker López (Spain) Josu Arambarri

== Management ==
The current club president (elected in June 2022, following Aitor Elizegi) is Jon Uriarte.

The board of the Athletic Club is composed of the following directors:

- President: Jon Uriarte
- Vice-president: Mikel Martínez
- Secretary: Fernando San José
- Vice-Secretary: María Tato
- Treasurer: Aitor Bernardo.
- Accountant: Jon Ander de las Fuentes
- Board members: Begoña Castaño, Goyo Arbizu, Itziar Villamandos, Óscar Beristain, Joana Martínez, Iker Goñi, Óscar Arce, Ricardo Hernani, Tomás Ondarra, Jorge Gómez, Manu Mosteiro
- Managing Director: Jon Berasategi
- General Secretary: Juan Ignacio Añibarro
- Sporting Director: Víctor Moreno

== Crest ==
Athletic's shield has incorporated the escutcheons of Bilbao and Biscay. From the shield of Bilbao, it takes the bridge and the church of San Anton, and the wolves from the powerful Haro family, who were lords of Biscay and founders of Bilbao in 1300. From the shield of Biscay, it takes the Gernikako Arbola (Guernica's tree) and the cross of Saint Andrew (saltires). Its first documented use dates from 1922.

The first official club crest was a blue circle surrounded by a belt with the letters A and C in the centre in white (as the club colours were at that point). The second was from 1910, consisting of a red-and-white flag (newly adopted as the shirt colours) with a red square in the top left corner, containing the initials of the club in white. The third, from 1913, involved the same flag, but in this case shown on a pole wrapped around a football (this is very similar to the Real Sociedad crest still in use today, ignoring the crown of royal patronage).

The first version of the current crest, roughly an inverted triangular shield shape with a section of red-and-white stripes and a section of local motifs, is from 1922; this was a really simple version which was adapted several times, some of which closely resembled the crest of Atlético Madrid, originally a branch of the Bilbao club. Finally, in 1941 the first version of the current shield was created, but the name "Atlético Bilbao" was used when General Francisco Franco outlawed all non-Spanish names during his regime. In 1972, the club added full colour to the design and recovered the original English "Athletic Club" name. In 2008, the shape of the shield was slightly altered and a new "Athletic Club" typeface was introduced.

Historical evolution of the shield
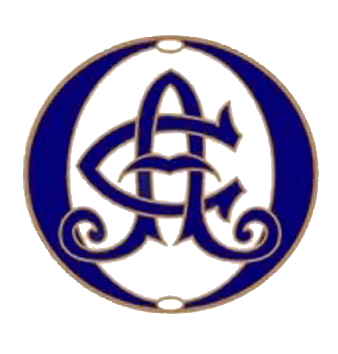
First own shield with intertwined initials (1901–1902)

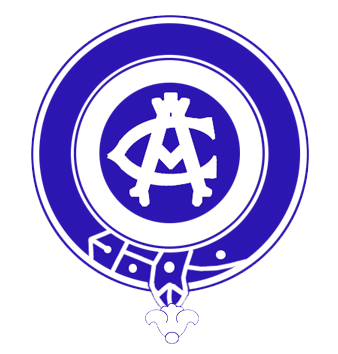
Shield stylization and chromatic adjustment (1903–1910)

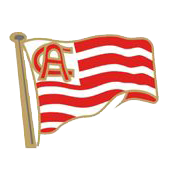
The initials are transferred to a flag with the new colors (1910–1913)

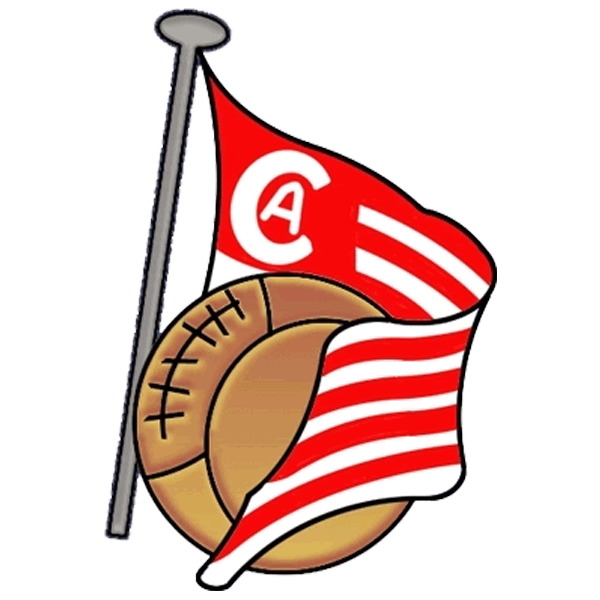
A ball is added to the one that embraces the flag (1913–1922)

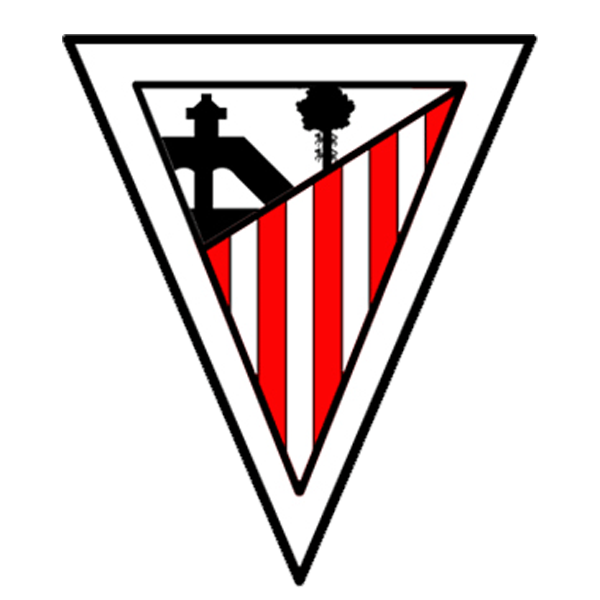
The signs of the city and club are collected on a shield (1922)

== Club colours ==
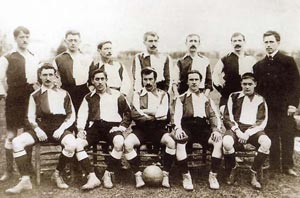
Snapshot with the first blue and white quartered kit.

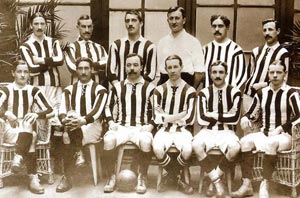
First photograph with the new red and white kit (1910).

Athletic began playing in an improvised white kit, but in the 1902–03 season, the club's first official strip became half-blue, half-white shirts similar to those worn by Blackburn Rovers, which were donated by Juan Moser. The accepted version of the story behind the major shift in the playing kit involves a young student from Bilbao named Juan Elorduy, who was spending Christmas 1909 in London, was charged by the club to buy 25 new shirts, but was unable to find enough. Waiting for the ship back to Bilbao and empty handed, Elorduy realised that the colours of the local team Southampton matched the colours of the City of Bilbao, and bought 50 shirts to take with him. Upon arriving in Bilbao, the club's directors decided almost immediately to change the team's strip to the new colours, and since 1910, Athletic Club have played in red and white stripes. Of the 50 shirts bought by Elorduy, half were then sent to Atlético Madrid, where Elorduy was a committee member and a former player; it had originally begun as a youth branch of Athletic Bilbao. An investigation in 2023 proposed an alternative kit origin location as Sunderland, a city which had connections for several club officials of the period and where their club also wore the same colours. Before the switch, only one other team in Spain wore red and white: Sporting de Gijón, since 1905. Change colours have often been blue and/or white, or black. In 2011, Athletic released a green, white and red away kit inspired by the Basque flag (this was worn against Atlético Madrid in the 2012 UEFA Europa League final).

Between 2001 and 2009 Athletic also manufactured their own playing kit, under the brand 100% Athletic and utilising the small design from their centenary celebrations as a manufacturer's logo.

Athletic were one of the last major clubs which did not have the logo of an official sponsor emblazoned on their kit. In the UEFA Cup and the Copa del Rey of 2004–05, the shirt sported the word "Euskadi" in green with sponsorship from the Basque Government. This policy was changed in 2008, when Athletic made a deal with the Biscay-based Petronor oil company to wear their logo in exchange for over €2 million. The Kutxabank logo now adorns the front of Athletic's kits.

=== Kit evolution ===
Home colours

1898 – 1902	1903 – 1909	1910 – 1912	1913 – 1922	1923 – 1949	1949 – 1960	1960 – 1970	1970 – 1974	1974 – 1980

1980 – 1983	1983 – 1986	1986 – 1989	1989-90	1990-91	1991-92	1992-93	1993-94	1994-95

1995-97	1997-98	1998-99	1999-01	2001-04	2004-07	2007-09	2009-10	2010-11

2011-12	2012-13	2013-14	2014-15	2015-16	2016-17	2017-18	2018-19	2019-20

2020-21	2021-22	2022-23	2023-24

=== Kit suppliers and shirt sponsors ===
Period	Kit manufacturer	Shirt sponsor (Front)	Shirt sponsor (Back)	Shirt sponsor (Sleeve)	Shorts sponsor
1980–1991	Adidas	None	None	None	None
1991–1999	Kappa	None	None	None	None
1999–2001	Adidas	None	None	None	None
2001–2008	100% Athletic	None	None	None	None
2008–2009	100% Athletic	Petronor	None	None	None
2009–2010	Umbro	Petronor	Euskadi	Diputación Foral de Vizcaya	None
2010–2011	Umbro	Petronor	None	Diputación Foral de Vizcaya	None
2011–2013	Umbro	Petronor	None	None	None
2013–2014	Nike (Note: The English-based kit manufacturer Umbro took responsibility for supplying the team in 2009, having agreed to a long-term contract which was supposed to expire in 2017. However, Nike sold subsidiary Umbro, the kits were manufactured by Nike from season 2013–14 onwards.)	Petronor	None	None	None
2014–2015	Nike	Petronor	BBK	None	None
2015–2017	Nike	Kutxabank	None	None	None
2017–2022	New Balance	Kutxabank	None	None	None
2022–2023	New Balance	Kutxabank	Digi	B2BinPay	None
2023–	Castore	Kutxabank	Digi	B2BinPay	Vueling

== Honours ==
National honours
Honour	No.	Years
La Liga	8	1929–30, 1930–31, 1933–34, 1935–36, 1942–43, 1955–56, 1982–83, 1983–84
Copa del Rey	24 (Note: The number of Copa del Rey wins Athletic Bilbao have been credited with is disputed. The 1902 Copa de la Coronación was won by Club Bizcaya, a team made up of players from Athletic Bilbao and Bilbao FC. In 1903 these two clubs merged as Athletic Bilbao and took part in the first official Copa del Rey in 1903. The 1902 trophy is on display in the Athletic museum and the club includes it in its own honours list. However the LFP and RFEF official statistics do not regard this as an official edition of the Copa del Rey won by Athletic.)	1903, 1904, 1910, 1911, 1914, 1915, 1916, 1921, 1923, 1930, 1931, 1932, 1933, 1943, 1944, 1944–45, 1949–50, 1955, 1956, 1958, 1969, 1972–73, 1983–84, 2023–24
Supercopa de España	3	1984, (Note: Cup awarded automatically as the club won both the Copa del Rey and La Liga.) 2015, 2021
Copa Eva Duarte	1	1950

Regional honours
Honour	No.	Years
Copa Vasca	1	1936
Campeonato Regional del Norte	5 (Note: In the 1917–18 North Championship, Athletic 'retired from the competition once finalised'. after finishing top of the table.)	1913–14, 1914–15, 1915–16, 1919–20, 1920–21
Campeonato Regional de Vizcaya	12 (Note: The 1938–39 Biscay Championship was won by Bilbao Athletic, a makeshift squad formed after the Spanish Civil War. The club includes this win and that in the 1935 Copa Vasca (below) for a total of 17.)	1922–23, 1923–24, 1925–26, 1927–28, 1928–29, 1930–31, 1931–32, 1932–33, 1933–34, 1934–35, 1938–39, 1939–40

== Results ==
Season	League									Cup	Europe		Other Comp.		Top scorer(s)	
Season	Div	Pos	Pld	W	D	L	GF	GA	Pts	Cup	Europe		Other Comp.		Player(s)	Goals
2015–16	1D	5th	38	18	8	12	58	45	62	QF	Europa League	QF	Supercopa de España	W	Aritz Aduriz	36
2016–17	1D	7th	38	19	6	13	53	43	63	R16	Europa League	R32			Aritz Aduriz	24
2017–18	1D	16th	38	10	13	15	41	49	43	R32	Europa League	R16			Aritz Aduriz	20
2018–19	1D	8th	38	13	14	11	41	45	53	R16					Iñaki Williams	14
2019–20	1D	11th	38	13	12	13	41	38	51	RU					Raúl García	15
2020–21	1D	10th	38	11	13	14	46	42	46	RU			Supercopa de España	W	Raúl García	10
2021–22	1D	8th	38	14	13	11	43	36	55	SF			Supercopa de España	RU	Iñaki Williams	8
2022–23	1D	8th	38	14	9	15	47	43	51	SF					Iñaki Williams	11
2023–24	1D	5th	38	19	11	8	61	37	68	W					Gorka Guruzeta	16 (Note: 14 goals in LaLiga)
2024–25	1D	4th	38	19	13	6	54	29	70	R16	Europa League	SF	Supercopa de España	SF	Oihan Sancet	17 (Note: 15 goals in LaLiga)
2025–26	1D	12th	38	17	6	19	43	58	45	SF	Champions League	LP	Supercopa de España	SF	Gorka Guruzeta	17 (Note: 10 goals in LaLiga)

Pos. = Position; Pld = Matches played; W = Matches won; D = Matches drawn; L = Matches lost; GF = Goals for; GA = Goals against; Pts = Points

Winners
Runners-up
Champions League Qualification
Europa League Qualification
Zarra Trophy

== Statistics and records ==
=== Statistics ===
Institutional information:

- Associates: 43,649 (2024)
- Official fans groups: 466 (at 2025)
- Budget: €155,816,797 (at 2024–25 season)
- TV income: €67,560,000 (at 2023–24 season)

Best positions

- Seasons in La Liga: all
- Best position in La Liga: 1st (8 times)
- Worst position in La Liga: 17th (once)
- Historical position in the ranking of La Liga: 4th
- Best position in UEFA Champions League / European Cup: Quarter-finals (1956–57)
- Best position in UEFA Europa League / UEFA Cup: Runners-up (1976–77, 2011–12)
- Entries in UEFA competitions: 33 (until the 2024–25 season)

6 participations in the UEFA Champions League / European Cup
19 participations in the UEFA Europa League / UEFA Cup
2 participations in the UEFA Cup Winners' Cup
5 participations in the Inter-Cities Fairs Cup
1 participation in the UEFA Intertoto Cup

Goals records

- Most goals scored in one match home: Athletic 12–1 Barcelona (1930–31)
- Most goals scored in one match away: Osasuna 1–8 Athletic (1958–59)
- Most goals scored in one match in Copa del Rey: Athletic 12–1 Celta Vigo (1946–47)
- Most goals scored in one match in European competitions: (Belgium) Standard Liège 1–7 Athletic (2004–05)

Player records

- Top goalscorers: Telmo Zarra (335), Dani (199), Aritz Aduriz (172)
- Most appearances: José Ángel Iribar (614), Óscar de Marcos (573), Iker Muniain (560)
- Most seasons at the club: Agustín Gaínza (21), José Ángel Iribar (18), José Luis Panizo, José Orúe and Txetxu Rojo (17)
- Most professional titles won with the club: Agustín Gaínza (10 titles)
- Youngest player to debut (in amateur competitions): Domingo Acedo (16 years old, 4 months, 12 days)
- Youngest player to debut (in professional competitions): Iker Muniain (16 years old, 7 months, 11 days)
- Youngest goalscorer (in amateur competitions): Domingo Acedo (16 years old, 4 months, 12 days)
- Youngest goalscorer (in professional competitions): Iker Muniain (16 years old, 7 months, 18 days)
- Oldest player to retire: Armando Ribeiro (39 years old, 119 days)
- Oldest goalscorer: Aritz Aduriz (38 years old, 302 days)
- Most expensive player signed: Iñigo Martínez (2018 for €32M from Real Sociedad)
- Most expensive player sold: Kepa Arrizabalaga (2018 for €80M/£71m to Chelsea)

=== Records ===
- Together with Real Madrid and Barcelona, Athletic is one of only three teams to have contested all editions of La Liga, without ever having been relegated
- In the 1929–30 season, finished the league unbeaten over 18 games
- Has the record for the biggest win in La Liga (12–1 over Barcelona, 1931)
- Has the record for the biggest win in Copa del Rey (12–1 over Celta Vigo, 1947)
- Has the record for the biggest wins away to Real Madrid (0–6 at Santiago Bernabéu), Barcelona (0–6 at Camp Nou), Espanyol (1–5) and Osasuna (1–8)
- Zarra is the Spanish player with the most goals in La Liga history (251)
- Zarra is the Spanish player with the most goals in a single La Liga season (38)
- Zarra is the Spanish player with the most top scorer awards in La Liga history (6)
- Zarra is the Spanish player with the most hat tricks in La Liga history (23)
- Gaínza has the record of most goals scored in a Liga match (8)
- Gaínza has the record of most appearances in the Copa del Rey by an outfield player (99)
- Zarra is the top scorer in the history of the Copa del Rey (81)
- Zarra holds the record for most goals in a Copa del Rey final (4)

== Stadium information ==
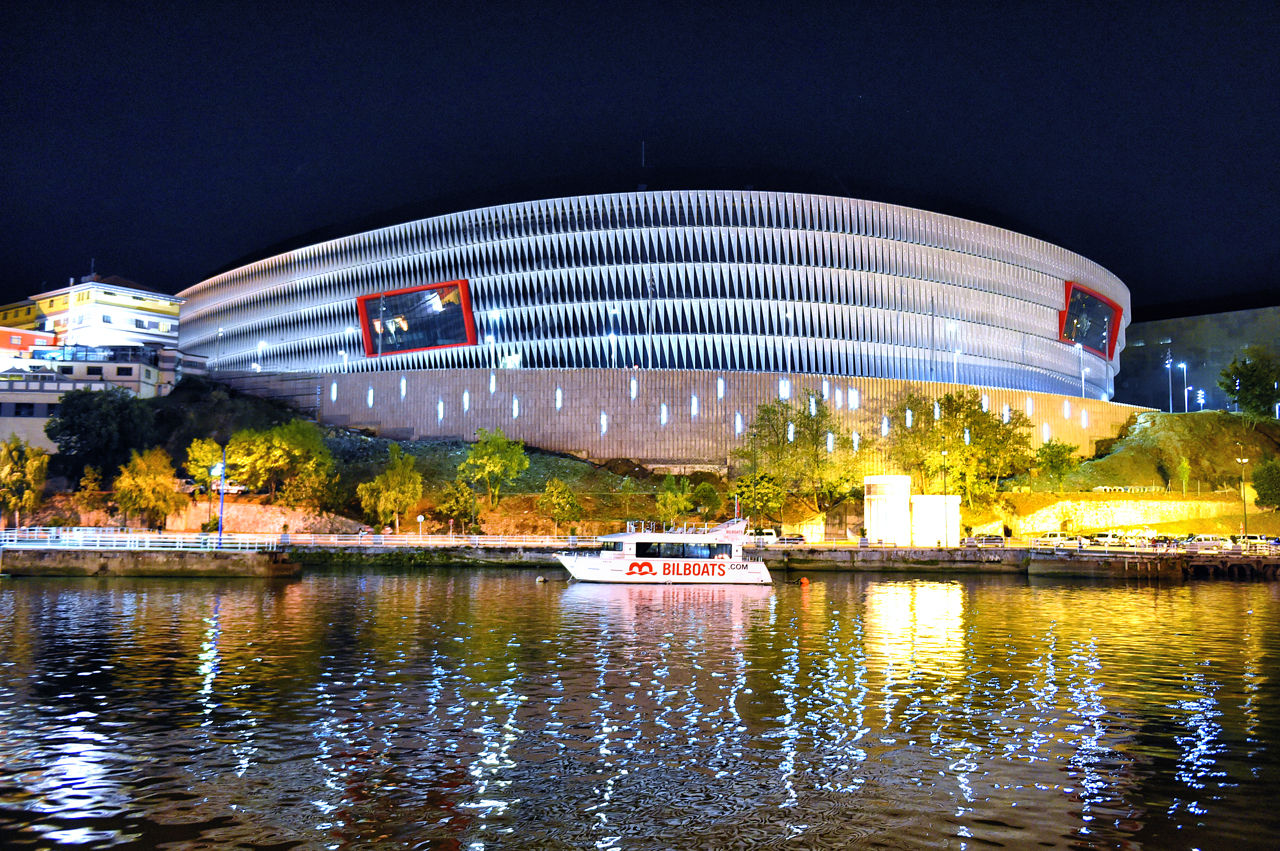
San Mames exterior view at night

- Name: San Mamés
- Nickname: La Catedral (en: The cathedral)
- City: Bilbao
- Opened: September 2013
- Capacity: 53,289
- Beginning construction: 25 May 2010
- End construction (partial): September 2013
- End construction (total): August 2014
- Pitch size: 105 m × 68 m (344 ft × 223 ft)
- Sports Facilities: Lezama

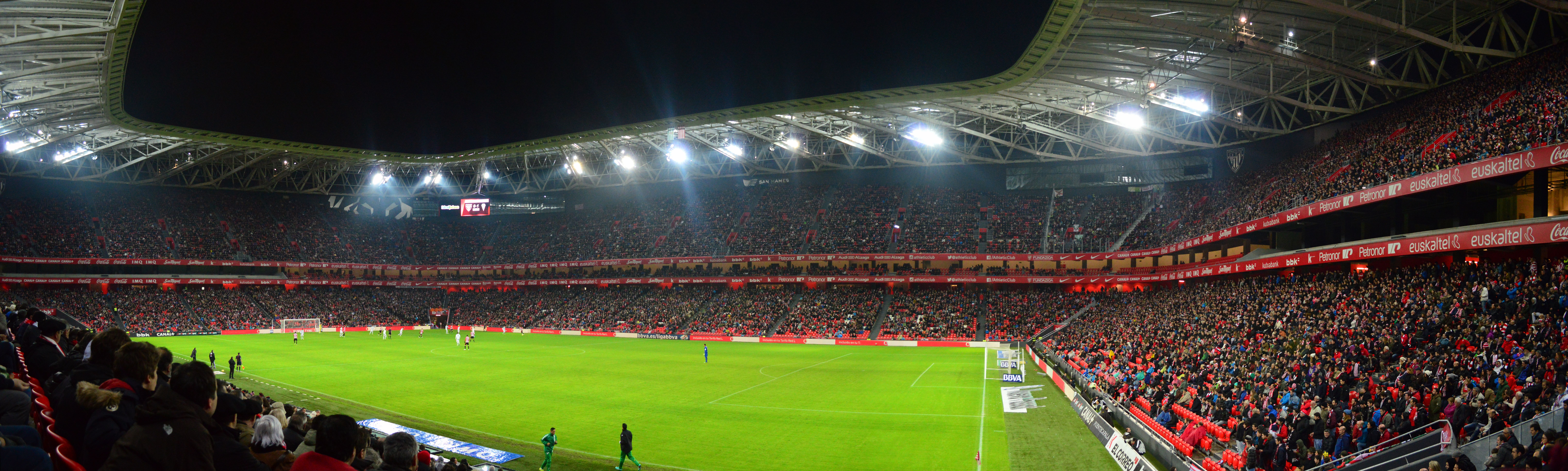
Panoramic view of San Mames stadium

== Lezama facilities ==
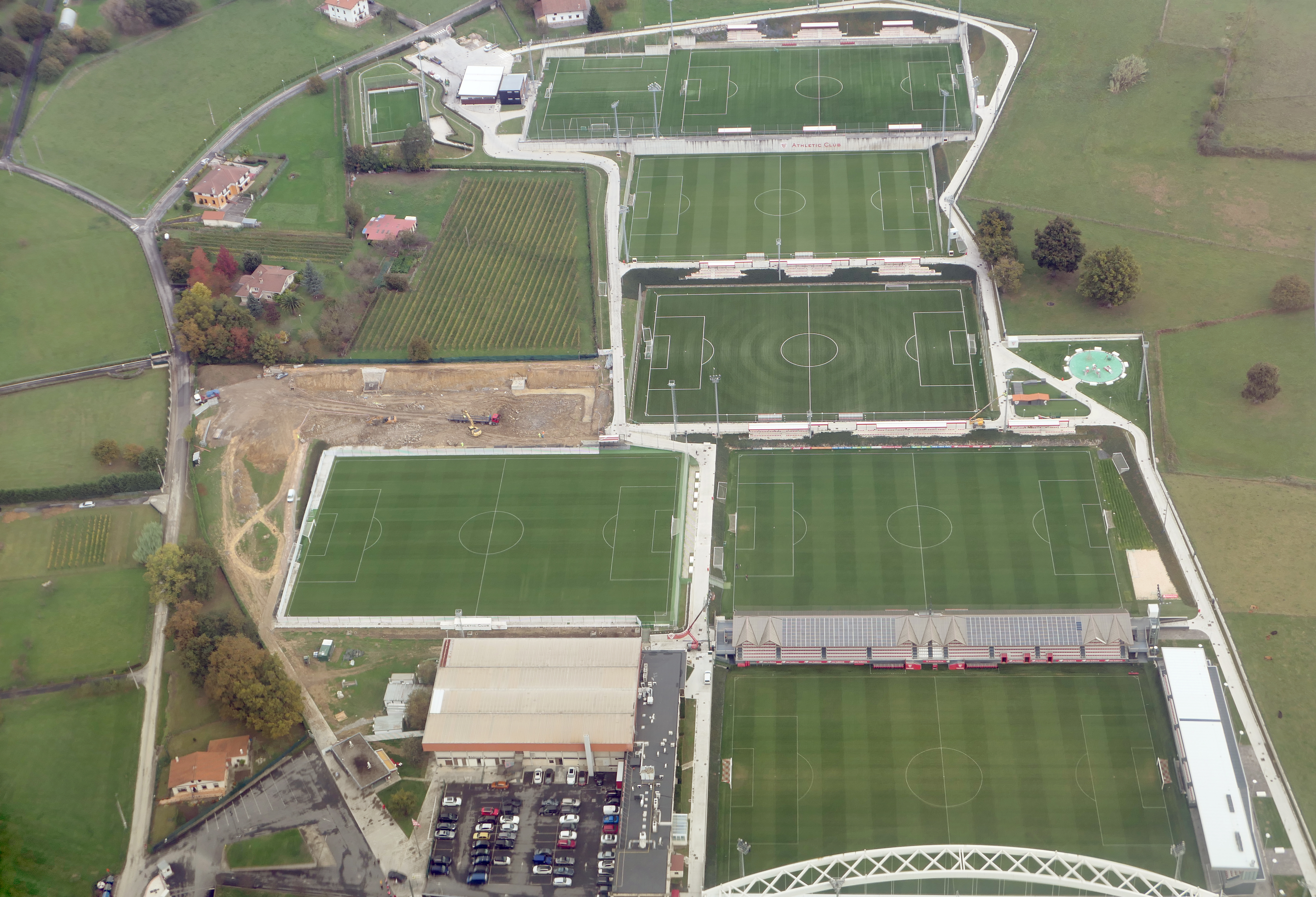
An aerial view of the Lezama complex, 2019

The Lezama Facilities is the complex where all of the categories of Athletic train. It was opened in the 1971–72 season, under the presidency of Felix Oráa. At present, facilities include, inter alia, five natural grass fields, a gymnasium, a pediment, a medical center and a residence for young players. Lezama has undergone remodeling since 1995 under the presidency of José María Arrate with the construction of new roads and parking entry and exit able to absorb the large number of vehicles that come every day, and a platform cover bringing greater convenience to fans attending the matches of the youth teams and other youth football teams.

These facilities are located in the municipality of Lezama, approximately 13 km from Bilbao.

=== Future ===
The Board has given the green light to the so-called "Lezama Master Plan", which was founded with the purpose of modernizing the structures of both the youth teams and first team. The "Plan" is the result of a rigorous study of the basic needs for the future of the Athletic Club. The work will take place over the course of two to three years and its budget is around €12 million. The club is committed to consolidate its cantera structure, which is the basis for the future of the club and in this regard Lezama will be expanded to classrooms for youth work in the lower categories and create an audiovisual department.

== Club rivalries ==
=== Real Sociedad ===
Athletic Club's main historical rival is Real Sociedad, a neighboring club against which it plays the classic Basque derby. Both teams have maintained a great rivalry since their beginnings, and although Athletic had a notably superior trajectory for many decades, since the 1980s the differences between both clubs have equalized significantly and, at the same time, the rivalry has increased.

=== Real Madrid and Barcelona ===
Against Real Madrid and Barcelona, Athletic has competed for many league and cup titles throughout its history. Athletic has recorded the most victories against both opponents (79 wins over Barcelona and 76 over Madrid, as of 2024), ahead of the likes of Atlético Madrid, Valencia, Sevilla and Real Sociedad.

=== Osasuna ===
Athletic also maintains a significant rivalry with Osasuna, and there has been continuous friction between the clubs in recent years.

== See also ==
- Bilbao Athletic – B team in Segunda División B
- CD Basconia – affiliate team for under-20 players in Tercera División
- Athletic Bilbao cantera – youth system up to 19 years, in leagues including División de Honor Juvenil
- Athletic Bilbao (women) – women's team in the Primera División Femenino
- List of Athletic Bilbao records and statistics
- Athletic Bilbao signing policy
- One Club Award – an annual award organised by Athletic that honours players who only represented one club over the course of their career.
- Politics and sports
