= Yuri Berchiche =

Spanish footballer (born 1990)

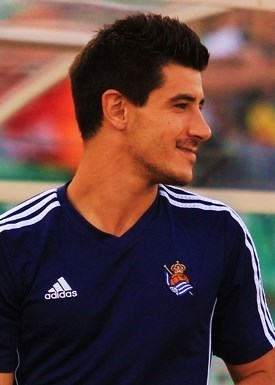
- Berchiche with Real Sociedad in 2014

Personal information
- Full name: Yuri Berchiche Izeta
- Date of birth: 10 February 1990 (age 36)
- Place of birth: Zarautz, Spain
- Height: 1.81 m (5 ft 11 in)
- Position: Left-back

Team information
- Current team: Athletic Bilbao
- Number: 17

Youth career
- 2000–2004: Antiguoko
- 2004–2005: Real Sociedad
- 2005–2007: Athletic Bilbao
- 2007–2009: Tottenham Hotspur

Senior career*
Years	Team	Apps	(Gls)
2008–2010	Tottenham Hotspur	0	(0)
2009	→ Cheltenham Town (loan)	7	(0)
2009–2010	→ Valladolid B (loan)	25	(0)
2009	→ Valladolid (loan)	1	(0)
2010–2012	Real Unión	45	(1)
2012–2017	Real Sociedad	77	(3)
2012–2014	→ Eibar (loan)	67	(7)
2017–2018	Paris Saint-Germain	22	(2)
2018–	Athletic Bilbao	230	(11)

International career^{‡}
2006	Spain U17	6	(0)
2014–	Basque Country	6	(0)
- * Club domestic league appearances and goals as of 16:01, 25 October 2026 (UTC) ‡ National team caps and goals as of 16:30, 17 November 2020 (UTC)

Yuri Berchiche Izeta (born 10 February 1990) is a Spanish professional footballer who plays as a left-back for La Liga club Athletic Bilbao.

He began his senior career at Tottenham Hotspur without making a first-team appearance, being loaned to Cheltenham Town and Real Valladolid. In 2010, he joined Real Unión in the Segunda División, moving on to Real Sociedad who loaned him two years to Eibar, where he won two successive promotions, later spending three seasons in La Liga with Real, leading to him being signed by Paris Saint-Germain in 2017; he played a part in a treble-winning season in France, but transferred back to the Basque region with Athletic Bilbao in 2018.

Berchiche played more than 275 competitive matches during his spell at Athletic, winning the 2023–24 Copa del Rey.

== Club career ==
=== Early years and Tottenham ===
Born in Zarautz, Gipuzkoa, Basque Country to an Algerian father and a Spanish mother, Berchiche started his career in the cantera of Real Sociedad, but left for rivals Athletic Bilbao at the age of 16. On 8 June 2007, Athletic and Tottenham Hotspur agreed on a transfer, and the player continued his footballing development in England at the club's academy; while playing for Tottenham's under-18 at the Eurofoot Tournament in Belgium, he was named "Player of the tournament", as Spurs won the competition after beating R.S.C. Anderlecht 4–0 in the final.

Berchiche joined League One team Cheltenham Town on a month's loan, on 26 March 2009. He made his league debut two days later, in a 1–1 away draw against Walsall.

In April 2009, Berchiche made a robust tackle on Scunthorpe United's Henri Lansbury (on loan from Arsenal), leaving his opponent with a suspected broken leg. Although he was not sent off for the challenge, Cheltenham manager Martin Allen ordered him to leave the field anyway; it was later revealed that Lansbury did not sustain any major damage to his leg.

In July 2009, Berchiche returned to Spain and joined Real Valladolid, still on loan. Benefitting from the absence of longtime incumbent Alberto Marcos due to injury, he started in the first league game, a 0–0 draw at UD Almería. It would be his only La Liga appearance of the season as he was mainly registered by the reserves, and the Castile and León side also suffered relegation.

=== Real Sociedad ===
In the summer of 2010, aged 20, Berchiche was released by Tottenham, signing a two-year contract with Real Unión in the Segunda División B. On 29 June 2012, after two full campaigns, he returned to Real Sociedad, who immediately loaned him to another team in the third tier, neighbouring SD Eibar.

In early 2014, Berchiche renewed his contract with the Txuriurdin until 2016. In June, after helping Eibar obtain promotion to the top flight for the first time in its history, he was selected by the Liga Nacional de Fútbol Profesional to its starting XI.

Berchiche returned to Real Sociedad in August 2014, being assigned to the main squad. He subsequently became the starter, replacing longtime incumbent Alberto de la Bella.

=== Paris Saint-Germain ===
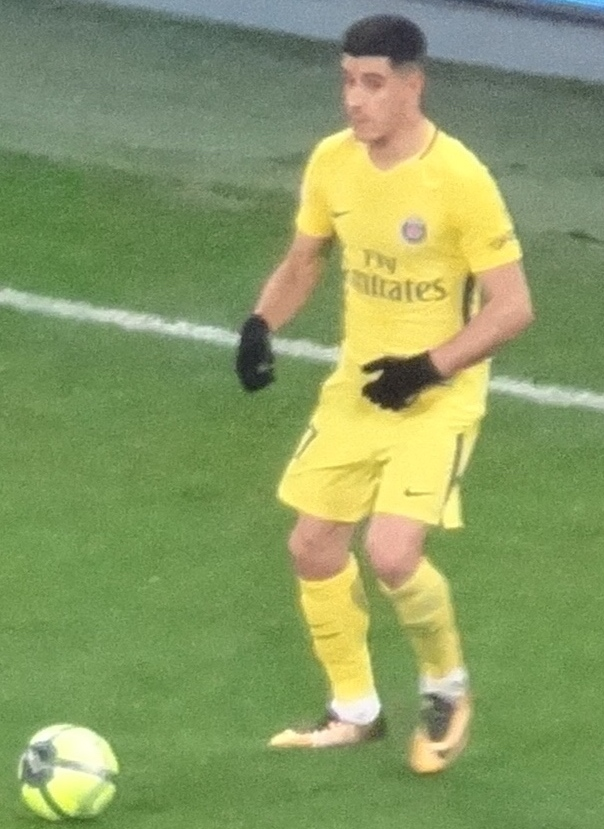
Berchiche playing with Paris Saint-Germain, 2018

On 7 July 2017, Berchiche signed a four-year contract with Paris Saint-Germain FC. He made his Ligue 1 debut on 8 September, playing the full 90 minutes in the 5–1 away win against FC Metz. His first goal in the competition arrived on 20 December, in a 3–1 home victory over Stade Malherbe Caen.

Berchiche played 32 competitive matches in his only season, winning three trophies including the national championship and the Coupe de France, defeating amateurs Les Herbiers VF 2–0 in the final of the latter tournament.

=== Athletic Bilbao ===
On 2 July 2018, PSG announced they had agreed a deal with Athletic Bilbao for the permanent transfer of Berchiche (an initial fee of €19 million, with a further €6 million in possible add-ons). The contract was announced as running through 2022, with a release clause of €100 million. He scored in only his second league appearance on 27 August, helping the hosts draw 2–2 against SD Huesca. Two teammates from his time at Eibar, Dani García and Ander Capa, had also recently joined the squad, and before the end of the calendar year they were reunited with their coach from that time, Gaizka Garitano.

On 5 March 2020, Berchiche scored late in the semi-final second leg of the Copa del Rey against Granada CF and enabled his team to progress on the away goals rule. In addition to the decisive game, which was delayed until April 2021 by the COVID-19 pandemic in Spain, they also qualified for the 2020–21 Supercopa de España which they won by beating FC Barcelona; however, he was unable to take part in those matches due to a thigh injury sustained against the same opposition a few weeks earlier. He recovered by the time the postponed 2020 final did take place, but his side lost to his previous employers Real Sociedad. Athletic also reached the 2021 Copa del Rey Final, played two weeks after the 2020 edition, only to be defeated again, 4–0 by Barcelona. That proved to be the player's last appearance of the campaign due to a persistent pubalgia issue which light treatment failed to cure, and an operation was carried out in July with an estimated recovery time of three months – manager Marcelino García Toral expressed his frustration at the delay in the injury being dealt with. Despite his physical problems, in October he agreed to an extension to his contract to run until 2024.

== International career ==
Berchiche represented Spain at under-17 and under-18 levels. He also featured for the unofficial Basque Country regional team.

Berchiche declined approaches to play for Algeria on several occasions.

== Career statistics ==
As of match played 25 October 2026

Appearances and goals by club, season and competition
Club	Season	League			National cup		Europe		Other		Total	
Club	Season	Division	Apps	Goals	Apps	Goals	Apps	Goals	Apps	Goals	Apps	Goals
Tottenham Hotspur	2008–09	Premier League	0	0	0	0	0	0	0	0	0	0
Tottenham Hotspur	2009–10	Premier League	0	0	0	0	—		0	0	0	0
Tottenham Hotspur	Total		0	0	0	0	0	0	0	0	0	0
Cheltenham Town (loan)	2008–09	League One	7	0	0	0	—		0	0	7	0
Valladolid (loan)	2009–10	La Liga	1	0	2	0	—		—		3	0
Valladolid B (loan)	2009–10	Tercera División	25	0	—		—		—		25	0
Real Unión	2010–11	Segunda División B	14	1	1	0	—		2 (Note: Appearances in Segunda División B play-offs)	0	17	1
Real Unión	2011–12	Segunda División B	31	0	0	0	—		—		31	0
Real Unión	Total		45	1	1	0	—		2	0	48	1
Real Sociedad	2012–13	La Liga	0	0	0	0	—		—		0	0
Real Sociedad	2013–14	La Liga	0	0	0	0	0	0	—		0	0
Real Sociedad	2014–15	La Liga	21	0	4	0	0	0	—		25	0
Real Sociedad	2015–16	La Liga	21	0	1	0	—		—		22	0
Real Sociedad	2016–17	La Liga	35	3	6	0	—		—		41	3
Real Sociedad	Total		77	3	11	0	0	0	—		88	3
Eibar (loan)	2012–13	Segunda División B	30	4	3	0	—		6	0	39	4
Eibar (loan)	2013–14	Segunda División	37	3	1	0	—		—		38	3
Eibar (loan)	Total		67	7	4	0	—		6	0	77	7
Paris Saint-Germain	2017–18	Ligue 1	22	2	5	0	2 (Note: Appearances in UEFA Champions League)	0	3 (Note: Appearances in Coupe de la Ligue)	0	32	2
Athletic Bilbao	2018–19	La Liga	35	2	2	0	—		—		37	2
Athletic Bilbao	2019–20	La Liga	33	2	7 (Note: Includes appearance in 2020 Copa del Rey final (played in 2021))	4	—		—		40	6
Athletic Bilbao	2020–21	La Liga	23	1	6	0	—		0	0	29	1
Athletic Bilbao	2021–22	La Liga	14	1	4	0	—		2 (Note: Appearances in Supercopa de España)	0	20	1
Athletic Bilbao	2022–23	La Liga	29	1	7	0	—		—		36	1
Athletic Bilbao	2023–24	La Liga	27	3	6	0	—		—		33	3
Athletic Bilbao	2024–25	La Liga	30	0	2	0	11 (Note: Appearances in UEFA Europa League)	1	1	0	44	1
Athletic Bilbao	2025–26	La Liga	32	0	3	0	4	0	0	0	39	0
Athletic Bilbao	2026–27	La Liga	7	1	0	0	—		—		7	1
Athletic Bilbao	Total		230	11	37	4	15	1	3	0	285	16
Career total			474	24	60	4	17	1	14	0	565	29

== Honours ==
Eibar

- Segunda División: 2013–14

Paris Saint Germain

- Ligue 1: 2017–18
- Coupe de France: 2017–18
- Coupe de la Ligue: 2017–18

Athletic Bilbao

- Copa del Rey: 2023–24; runner-up: 2019–20, 2020–21
