= Peio Canales =

Spanish footballer (born 2005)

Personal information
- Full name: Peio Canales Urtasun
- Date of birth: 17 January 2005 (age 21)
- Place of birth: Barrika, Spain
- Height: 1.75 m (5 ft 9 in)
- Position: Midfielder

Team information
- Current team: Athletic Bilbao
- Number: 28

Youth career
- Barrika
- 2016–2023: Athletic Bilbao

Senior career*
Years	Team	Apps	(Gls)
2023–2024	Basconia	0	(0)
2023–2025	Bilbao Athletic	43	(5)
2024–	Athletic Bilbao	15	(0)
2025–2026	→ Racing Santander (loan)	35	(6)

International career^{‡}
2022–2023	Spain U18	8	(1)
2023–2024	Spain U19	8	(1)
2025	Spain U20	3	(0)
2025–	Spain U21	7	(0)
- * Club domestic league appearances and goals as of 16:02, 25 October 2026 (UTC) ‡ National team caps and goals as of 22:16, 16 October 2026 (UTC)

Peio Canales Urtasun (born 17 January 2005) is a Spanish professional footballer who plays as a midfielder for La Liga club Athletic Bilbao.

== Club career ==
Born in Barrika, Biscay, Basque Country, Canales joined Athletic Bilbao's youth setup in 2016, from hometown side Barrika FE. He made his senior debut with the reserves on 3 September 2023, coming on as a late substitute in a 0–0 Segunda Federación away draw against UD Logroñés.

Canales spent most of the campaign with the B-team, scoring his first goals on 25 November 2023, by netting a brace in a 4–0 home routing of CD Tudelano. On 16 April 2024, he renewed his contract until 2027. He only featured once with the farm team CD Basconia, a 3–0 home loss to Club Portugalete in the 2024 Tercera Federación play-offs.

Canales made his first team – and La Liga – debut on 29 September 2024, replacing Álex Berenguer in a 1–1 home draw against Sevilla FC. The following 15 August, he was loaned to Segunda División side Racing de Santander for the season.

== International career ==
Canales is a Spain youth international, having represented the under-18 side. He has played with the under-19 for the 2024 UEFA European Under-19 Championship qualification matches, and scored a goal in a friendly match against Norway.

He received his first call-up to the Spain U21 in August 2025 for the 2027 UEFA European Under-21 Championship qualification and made his debut as a substitute against Cyprus. He was later included in the Spain U20 squad for the 2025 FIFA U-20 World Cup in Chile.

== Career statistics ==
As of match played 25 October 2026

Appearances and goals by club, season and competition
Club	Season	League			Copa del Rey		Europe		Other		Total	
Club	Season	Division	Apps	Goals	Apps	Goals	Apps	Goals	Apps	Goals	Apps	Goals
Basconia	2023–24	Tercera Federación	0	0	—		—		1 (Note: Appearance in 2024 Tercera Federación play-offs)	0	1	0
Bilbao Athletic	2023–24	Segunda Federación	26	3	—		—		—		26	3
Bilbao Athletic	2024–25	Primera Federación	17	2	—		—		—		17	2
Bilbao Athletic	Total		43	5	—		—		—		44	5
Athletic Bilbao	2024–25	La Liga	8	0	0	0	0	0	0	0	8	0
Athletic Bilbao	2026–27	La Liga	7	0	0	0	—		—		7	0
Athletic Bilbao	Total		15	0	0	0	0	0	0	0	15	0
Racing Santander (loan)	2025–26	Segunda División	35	6	0	0	—		—		35	6
Career total			93	11	0	0	0	0	1	0	94	8

== Honours ==
Bilbao Athletic

- Segunda Federación (Group 2): 2023–24

Racing Santander

- La Liga 2: 2025–26
