= Eder García =

Spanish footballer (born 2004)

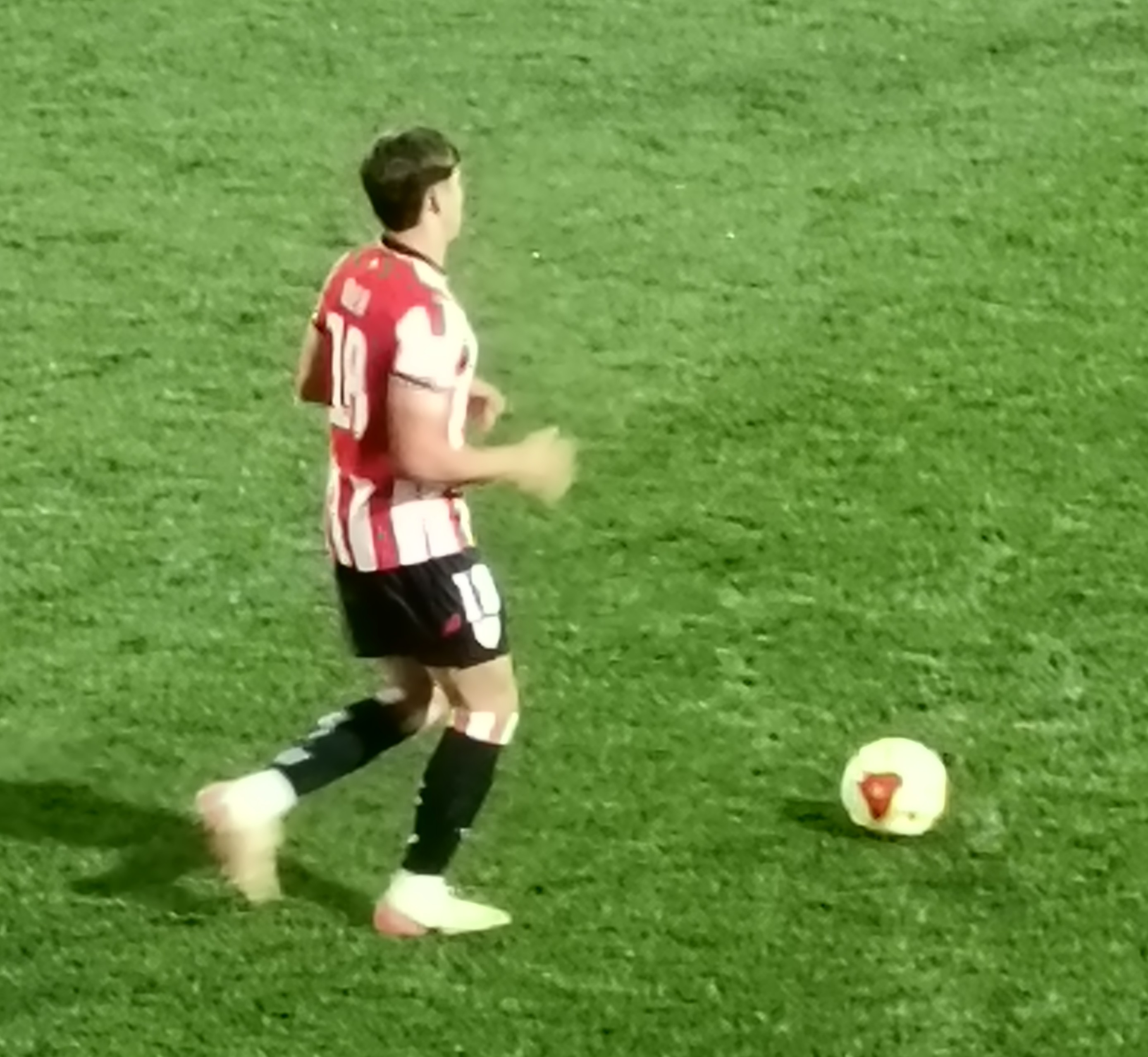
- García playing for Bilbao Athletic in 2025

Personal information
- Full name: Eder García Altuna
- Date of birth: 4 January 2004 (age 22)
- Place of birth: Errenteria, Spain
- Height: 1.81 m (5 ft 11 in)
- Position: Midfielder

Team information
- Current team: Córdoba (on loan from Athletic Bilbao)

Youth career
- Touring
- 2018–2022: Real Sociedad

Senior career*
Years	Team	Apps	(Gls)
2022–2023	Real Sociedad C	25	(3)
2022–2025	Real Sociedad B	70	(7)
2025–2026	Bilbao Athletic	34	(4)
2026–	Athletic Bilbao	2	(0)
2026–	→ Córdoba (loan)	1	(1)
- * Club domestic league appearances and goals as of 16 August 2026

Eder García Altuna (born 4 January 2004) is a Spanish footballer who plays as a midfielder for Córdoba CF, on loan from Athletic Bilbao.

== Career ==
Born in Errenteria, Gipuzkoa, Basque Country, García joined Real Sociedad's youth sides in 2018, from Touring KE. He made his senior debut with the C-team on 30 January 2022, coming on as a late substitute for Jon Gorrotxategi in a 1–0 Segunda Federación away loss to Sestao River Club.

García first appeared with the reserves on 8 October 2022, replacing Pablo Marín late into a 1–0 loss at CD Numancia. He subsequently became a regular starter for the Bs, and contributed with four goals in 39 appearances overall during the 2024–25 season as the club achieved promotion to Segunda División.

On 5 July 2025, García moved to Athletic Bilbao on a free transfer, as his contract with Real Sociedad had expired, and was initially assigned to the B-side also in Primera Federación. He made his first team – and La Liga – debut the following 20 February, replacing Unai Gómez in a 2–1 home win over Elche CF.

On 8 July 2026, García was loaned to second division side Córdoba CF for one year. On his club debut on 16 August, he scored his first professional goal, netting the equalizer in a 3–2 away loss to Burgos CF.

== Career statistics ==
As of match played 15 March 2026

Appearances and goals by club, season and competition
Club	Season	League			Cup		Europe		Other		Total	
Club	Season	Division	Apps	Goals	Apps	Goals	Apps	Goals	Apps	Goals	Apps	Goals
Real Sociedad C	2021–22	Segunda Federación	2	0	—		—		—		2	0
Real Sociedad C	2022–23	Segunda Federación	23	3	—		—		—		23	3
Real Sociedad C	Total		25	3	—		—		—		25	3
Real Sociedad B	2022–23	Primera Federación	5	0	—		—		—		5	0
Real Sociedad B	2023–24	Primera Federación	30	3	—		—		—		30	3
Real Sociedad B	2024–25	Primera Federación	35	4	—		—		4 (Note: Appearances in 2025 Primera Federación play-offs)	0	39	4
Real Sociedad B	Total		70	7	—		—		4	0	74	7
Bilbao Athletic	2025–26	Primera Federación	26	3	—		—		—		26	3
Athletic Bilbao	2025–26	La Liga	2	0	—		—		—		2	0
Career total			123	13	0	0	0	0	4	0	127	13
