= List of Sevilla FC seasons =

Sevilla FC is a Spanish professional football club based in Sevilla, Andalusia, who play their matches in Estadio Ramón Sánchez Pizjuán. The club was formed 25 January 1890.

The club have won La Liga once and the Segunda División four times. They have won the Copa del Rey five times and the Supercopa de España once. Sevilla are the record winners of the UEFA Cup/UEFA Europa League, with seven titles won between 2006 and 2023. They also won the 2006 UEFA Super Cup.

This list details the club's achievements in major competitions, and the top scorers for each season. Highlighted top scorers were also the top scorers in the Spanish league that season. Records of local or regional competitions are not included due to them being considered of less importance.

== Key ==
Key to league record:

- Pld – Matches played
- W – Matches won
- D – Matches drawn
- L – Matches lost
- GF – Goals for
- GA – Goals against
- Pts – Points
- Pos. – Final position

Key to colours and symbols:
Symbol	Meaning
W	Winners
RU	Runners-up
↑	Promoted
↓	Relegated
EC / UCL	European Cup / UEFA Champions League
UC / UEL	UEFA Cup / UEFA Europa League
♦	Top league scorer in Sevilla's division

Key to rounds:

- Prel. – Preliminary round
- QR1 – First qualifying round
- QR2 – Second qualifying round, etc.
- PO – Play-off round
- Inter – Intermediate round (between qualifying rounds and rounds proper)
- GS – Group stage
- 1R – First round
- 2R – Second round, etc.
- QF – Quarter-finals
- SF – Semi-finals
- F – Final
- W – Winners
- DNE – Did not enter

== Seasons ==
Prior to 1929 Spain did not have a national football league. Sevilla competed in the championship of the Southern region, called Campeonato Sur, the winners of which qualified for the Copa del Rey along with the other regional champions. Sevilla became the champions of this league seventeen times and were runners-up three times. Because there is not much information from this era, the list of seasons starts at the beginning of La Liga in the 1928–29 season.

Results of league and cup competitions by season
Season	Division	Pld	W	D	L	GF	GA	Pts	Pos.	Copa del Rey	Supercopa	Cup	Result	Player(s)	Goals
Season	League									Copa del Rey	Supercopa	UEFA – FIFA		Top goalscorer(s)	
1928–29	Segunda División	18	8	6	4	35	24	22	1st	QF				N/A	-
1929–30	Segunda División	18	9	2	7	41	26	20	4th	2R				N/A	-
1930–31	Segunda División	18	10	3	5	42	26	23	2nd	2R				N/A	-
1931–32	Segunda División	16	5	1	10	25	31	11	8th	1R				N/A	-
1932–33	Segunda División	18	5	3	10	29	38	13	9th	2R				N/A	-
1933–34	Segunda División	18	11	5	2	56	27	27	1st ↑	2R				N/A	-
1934–35	La Liga	22	11	2	9	53	38	24	5th	W				(Spain) Campanal I	22
1935–36	La Liga	22	8	1	13	36	53	17	9th	5R				(Spain) Tache	10
1936–37	Spanish Civil War														
1937–38	Spanish Civil War														
1938–39	Spanish Civil War									W				(Spain) Campanal I	3
1939–40	La Liga	22	11	6	5	60	44	28	2nd	QF				(Spain) Raimundo Blanco	18
1940–41	La Liga	22	12	2	8	70	43	26	5th	QF				(Spain) Campanal I	17
1941–42	La Liga	26	10	7	9	58	45	27	6th	2R				(Spain) Campanal I	17
1942–43	La Liga	26	15	3	8	63	47	33	2nd	DNE				(Spain) Pepillo	16
1943–44	La Liga	26	12	8	6	60	46	32	3rd	QF				(Spain) Juan Arza	18
1944–45	La Liga	26	9	4	13	52	49	22	10th	QF				(Spain) Juan Arza	15
1945–46	La Liga	26	14	8	4	53	37	36	W	SF				(Spain) José Campos	17
1946–47	La Liga	26	12	5	9	54	48	29	6th	2R				(Spain) Juan Araujo	23
1947–48	La Liga	26	12	5	9	50	40	29	5th	W				(Spain) Juan Araujo	16
1948–49	La Liga	26	11	1	14	35	40	23	8th	6R	RU			(Spain) Juan Araujo	8
1949–50	La Liga	26	11	3	12	60	61	25	10th	QF				(Spain) Juan Araujo	15
1950–51	La Liga	30	17	4	9	79	46	38	2nd	1R				(Spain) Juan Araujo	20
1951–52	La Liga	30	14	4	12	69	57	32	6th	1R				(Spain) Juan Araujo	20
1952–53	La Liga	30	16	2	12	70	57	34	5th	4R				(Spain) Juan Arza	16
1953–54	La Liga	30	15	2	13	57	49	32	5th	SF				(Spain) Lorenzo Pérez	13
1954–55	La Liga	30	15	4	11	74	58	34	4th	RU				(Spain) Juan Arza♦	35
1955–56	La Liga	30	17	2	11	75	44	36	4th	1R				(Spain) Pepillo II	15
1956–57	La Liga	30	17	5	8	64	49	39	2nd	1R				(Spain) Pepillo II	15
1957–58	La Liga	30	9	7	14	45	55	25	10th	1R		EC	QF	(Spain) Lolo Gómez	10
1958–59	La Liga	30	12	2	16	44	58	26	12th	QF				(Spain) Antoniet	17
1959–60	La Liga	30	16	4	10	63	44	36	4th	2R				(Hungary) Tibor Szalay	14
1960–61	La Liga	30	9	9	12	42	46	27	11th	QF				(Spain) Antoniet (Argentina) José Carlos Diéguez	14
1961–62	La Liga	30	12	7	11	48	45	31	6th	RU				(Spain) Enrique Mateos	15
1962–63	La Liga	30	11	5	14	40	55	27	11th	3R		CWC	1R	(Spain) Cesáreo Rivera Pérez	14
1963–64	La Liga	30	9	11	10	33	38	29	9th	3R				(Argentina) José Carlos Diéguez	8
1964–65	La Liga	30	11	4	15	38	50	26	10th	2R				(Paraguay) Juan Bautista Agüero	7
1965–66	La Liga	30	9	9	12	27	38	27	8th	2R				(Paraguay) Pedro Antonio Cabral (Spain) Emilio Pintado	5
1966–67	La Liga	30	9	7	14	28	47	25	13th	3R				(Spain) José María Lizarralde	11
1967–68	La Liga	30	6	8	16	31	56	20	16th ↓	3R				(Uruguay) Danny Bergara	13
1968–69	Segunda División	38	22	9	7	56	30	53	1st ↑	DNE				(Uruguay) Danny Bergara	13
1969–70	La Liga	30	14	7	9	39	32	35	3rd	3R				(Paraguay) Bernardo Acosta Miranda	13
1970–71	La Liga	30	13	6	11	34	42	32	7th	SF				(Paraguay) Bernardo Acosta Miranda	15
1971–72	La Liga	34	9	9	16	35	45	27	16th ↓	6R				(Paraguay) Bernardo Acosta Miranda	14
1972–73	Segunda División	38	16	12	10	45	29	48	4th	5R				(Paraguay) Bernardo Acosta Miranda	15
1973–74	Segunda División	38	15	9	14	48	40	39	9th	4R				(Paraguay) Bernardo Acosta Miranda	20
1974–75	Segunda División	38	22	7	9	58	27	51	3rd ↑	4R				(The Gambia) Biri Biri	14
1975–76	La Liga	34	13	6	15	35	39	32	11th	4R				(Spain) Bartolomé Plaza	6
1976–77	La Liga	34	11	12	11	32	39	34	10th	QF				(Argentina) Héctor Scotta	12
1977–78	La Liga	34	13	8	13	38	45	34	8th	5R				(Argentina) Héctor Scotta	16
1978–79	La Liga	34	12	9	13	47	48	33	11th	SF				(Spain) Enrique Montero (Argentina) Héctor Scotta	9
1979–80	La Liga	34	14	6	14	50	47	34	8th	4R				(Argentina) Daniel Bertoni (Argentina) Héctor Scotta	16
1980–81	La Liga	34	14	9	11	42	37	37	8th	SF				(Argentina) Enrique Montero (Argentina) Carlos Morete	6
1981–82	La Liga	34	15	5	14	52	39	35	7th	1R				(Spain) Santi	13
1982–83	La Liga	34	15	12	7	44	31	42	5th	QF		UC	3R	(Spain) Enrique Magdaleno	10
1983–84	La Liga	34	13	8	13	42	43	34	8th	2R		UC	1R	(Spain) Juan Carlos Álvarez	8
1984–85	La Liga	34	10	11	13	29	41	31	12th	3R				(Spain) Enrique Magdaleno	9
1985–86	La Liga	34	12	10	12	39	34	34	9th	5R				(Spain) Enrique Montero	5
1986–87	La Liga	34	13	8	13	41	35	34	9th	3R				(Spain) Rámon	16
1987–88	La Liga	38	13	11	14	41	46	37	10th	6R				(Uruguay) Pablo Bengoechea	13
1988–89	La Liga	38	13	12	13	38	39	38	9th	4R				(Spain) Rámon	10
1989–90	La Liga	38	18	7	13	64	46	43	6th	2R				(Austria) Anton Polster	33
1990–91	La Liga	38	15	8	15	45	47	38	8th	QF		UC	2R	(Austria) Anton Polster	14
1991–92	La Liga	38	13	8	17	48	45	34	12th	QF				(Chile) Iván Zamorano	12
1992–93	La Liga	38	17	9	12	46	44	43	7th	6R				(Croatia) Davor Šuker	13
1993–94	La Liga	38	15	12	11	56	42	42	6th	QF				(Croatia) Davor Šuker	24
1994–95	La Liga	38	16	11	11	55	41	43	5th	4R				(Croatia) Davor Šuker	20
1995–96	La Liga	38	11	15	16	43	55	48	12th	QF		UC	3R	(Croatia) Davor Šuker	21
1996–97	La Liga	42	12	7	23	50	69	43	20th ↓	3R				(Spain) Salva	12
1997–98	Segunda División	42	17	11	14	47	44	62	7th	1R				(Denmark) Miklos Molnar	10
1998–99	Segunda División	42	20	11	11	66	50	71	4th ↑	4R				(Greece) Vasilios Tsiartas	21
1999–2000	La Liga	38	5	13	20	42	67	17	20th ↓	1R				(Spain) Juan Carlos	12
2000–01	Segunda División	42	23	11	8	66	39	80	1st ↑	1R				(Uruguay) Nicolás Olivera	16
2001–02	La Liga	38	14	11	13	51	40	53	8th	1R				(Spain) Moisés	13
2002–03	La Liga	38	13	11	14	38	39	50	10th	QF				(Spain) José Antonio Reyes	10
2003–04	La Liga	38	15	10	13	56	45	55	6th	SF				(Brazil) Júlio Baptista	25
2004–05	La Liga	38	17	9	12	44	41	60	6th	QF		UEL	3R	(Brazil) Júlio Baptista	25
2005–06	La Liga	38	20	8	10	54	39	68	5th	5R		UEL	W	(Argentina) Javier Saviola	15
2006–07	La Liga	38	21	8	9	64	35	71	3rd	W		USC UEL	W W	(Mali) Frédéric Kanouté	30
2007–08	La Liga	38	20	4	14	75	49	64	5th	5R	W	USC UCL	RU 2R	(Brazil) Luís Fabiano	33
2008–09	La Liga	38	21	7	10	54	39	70	3rd	SF		UEL	GS	(Mali) Frédéric Kanouté	23
2009–10	La Liga	38	19	6	13	65	49	63	4th	W		UCL	2R	(Brazil) Luís Fabiano	21
2010–11	La Liga	38	17	7	14	62	61	58	5th	SF	RU	UCL UEL	PO 2R	(Spain) Álvaro Negredo	26
2011–12	La Liga	38	13	11	14	48	47	50	9th	5R		UEL	PO	(Spain) Álvaro Negredo	14
2012–13	La Liga	38	14	8	16	58	54	50	9th	SF				(Spain) Álvaro Negredo	31
2013–14	La Liga	38	18	9	11	69	52	63	5th	4R		UEL	W	(Colombia) Carlos Bacca (France) Kevin Gameiro	21
2014–15	La Liga	38	23	7	8	71	45	76	5th	QF		USC UEL	RU W	(Colombia) Carlos Bacca	28
2015–16	La Liga	38	14	10	14	51	50	52	7th	RU		USC UCL UEL	RU GS W	(France) Kevin Gameiro	29
2016–17	La Liga	38	21	9	8	69	49	72	4th	5R	RU	USC UCL	RU 2R	(France) Wissam Ben Yedder	18
2017–18	La Liga	38	17	7	14	49	58	58	7th	RU		UCL	QF	(France) Wissam Ben Yedder	22
2018–19	La Liga	38	17	8	13	62	47	59	6th	QF	RU	UEL	3R	(France) Wissam Ben Yedder	30
2019–20	La Liga	38	19	13	6	54	34	70	4th	4R		UEL	W	(Argentina) Lucas Ocampos	17
2020–21	La Liga	38	24	5	9	53	33	77	4th	SF		USC UCL	RU 2R	(Morocco) Youssef En-Nesyri	24
2021–22	La Liga	38	18	16	4	53	30	70	4th	4R		UCL UEL	GS 3R	(Spain) Rafa Mir	13
2022–23	La Liga	38	13	10	15	47	54	49	12th	QF		UCL UEL	GS W	(Morocco) Youssef En-Nesyri	18
2023–24	La Liga	38	10	11	17	48	54	41	14th	QF		USC UCL	RU GS	(Morocco) Youssef En-Nesyri	20
2024–25	La Liga	38	10	11	17	42	55	41	17th	3R				(Belgium) Dodi Lukébakio	11
2025–26	La Liga	38	12	7	19	46	60	43	13th	3R				(Nigeria) Akor Adams	10
