= Miguel Torrontegui =

Spanish footballer (1913–2000)

Personal information
- Full name: Miguel López Torrontegui
- Date of birth: 14 July 1913
- Place of birth: Melilla, Spain
- Date of death: 2 April 2000 (aged 86)
- Place of death: Spain
- Position: Forward

Senior career*
Years	Team	Apps	(Gls)
1929–1930	Suárez		
1930–1932	Málaga		
1932–1936	Sevilla		
1938–1943	Sevilla		
- * Club domestic league appearances and goals

Miguel López Torrontegui (14 July 1913 – 2 April 2000) was a Spanish footballer who played as a forward for Sevilla between 1932 and 1943.

== Early life and education ==
Miguel López Torrontegui was born on 14 July 1913 in Melilla, a Spanish city on the African coast, as the fourth child of Bilbao native Miguel López, whose family had moved to Melilla after he bought the Setolazar mines from Abd el-Krim. Even though his father died when he was four, the family continued to live in the city, where he began to play football at the Christian Brothers' school. Following the outbreak of the Rif War in 1921, the family returned to Bilbao, settling in Portugalete. Soon after, however, the family moved again, this time to Málaga, because the doctors had recommended a milder climate than Bilbao due to his mother's illness.

Torrontegui continued his high school studies at the Marist Brothers school in Málaga, being part of the school's football team, and later joining the school's newly founded Sporting Club, then coached free of charge by Travieso, a former Spanish international, who taught Torrontegui a lot about football, especially how to head the ball, and likewise, he became the team's best header despite being only 1.67 meters in height.

== Career ==
Torrontegui began his career at CD Suárez, from which he joined CD Málaga in 1930, aged 17, becoming the team's youngest player. His performances in some friendlies against Real Betis caught the attention of their city rivals, Sevilla, which sought to recruit him, but Miguel's mother objected because she wanted her son to focus on studying engineering. On 12 September 1932, however, he signed for Sevilla after convincing his mother that the electrician and chemist specialties could only be taught in Seville. Together with Guillermo Eizaguirre, Campanal I, and Adolfo Bracero, he was a member of the Sevilla team that won the 1933–34 Segunda División, thus achieving promotion to the top flight, and the 1935 Copa del Rey, beating Sabadell 3–0 in the final. In 1936, he secured Sevilla's first-ever league victory over Betis, scoring the only goal of the game.

His career was then interrupted by the outbreak of the Spanish Civil War, but once the conflict was over, Torrontegui helped his side win two Andalusian championships (1938–39 and 1939–40), and the 1939 Copa del Generalísimo, beating Racing de Ferrol 6–2 in the final. In the early 1940s, he was a member of the great Sevilla attacking line known as the "Stukas", which scored 70 goals in the 1940–41 La Liga, including a historic 11–1 victory over Barcelona on 29 September 1940, to which he contributed with a hat-trick. Two years later, in 1942, he scored a six-goal haul against Real Oviedo.

Torrontegui stayed at Seville for over a decade, from 1932 until 1943, scoring a total of 41 goals in 92 La Liga matches. Shortly after his retirement, he was the subject of a tribute match, in which he bid his farewell to the Sevilla fans. Noted for his head games and ball control, he was also very versatile, as he played for Sevilla in seven different positions, performing well in all of them.

== Later life ==
In addition to football, Torrontegui was also a keen rower, so in 1960, he began organizing a coxed eight regatta between the crews of Sevilla and Betis on the Guadalquivir River, which is still held today, on the second Saturday of November of every year.

Torrontegui married Juanita Benjumea Turmo, with whom he had two daughters: Ana María and María Eugenia López Benjumea.

== Death ==
Torrontegui died on 2 April 2000, at the age of 86.

== Honours ==
Sevilla FC

- Andalusian championship:
  - Champions (3): 1936, 1939, and 1940
- La Liga
  - Runner-up (2): 1939–40 and 1942–43
- Copa del Rey:
  - Champions (1): 1939
