= Seville derby =

Local city derby in Seville, Spain

- Native name: Derby Sevillano
- Other names: El Gran Derbi
- Location: Seville, Andalusia, Spain
- Teams: Sevilla; Real Betis
- First meeting: 19 February 1928; Copa del Rey; Sevilla 3–3 Real Betis
- Latest meeting: 21 November 2026; La Liga; Sevilla 1–1 Real Betis
- Stadiums: Estadio Ramón Sánchez Pizjuán (Sevilla); Estadio Benito Villamarín (Real Betis)

Statistics
- Total meetings: 145
- Most wins: Sevilla (66)
- Most player appearances: Jesús Navas (Sevilla) (28)
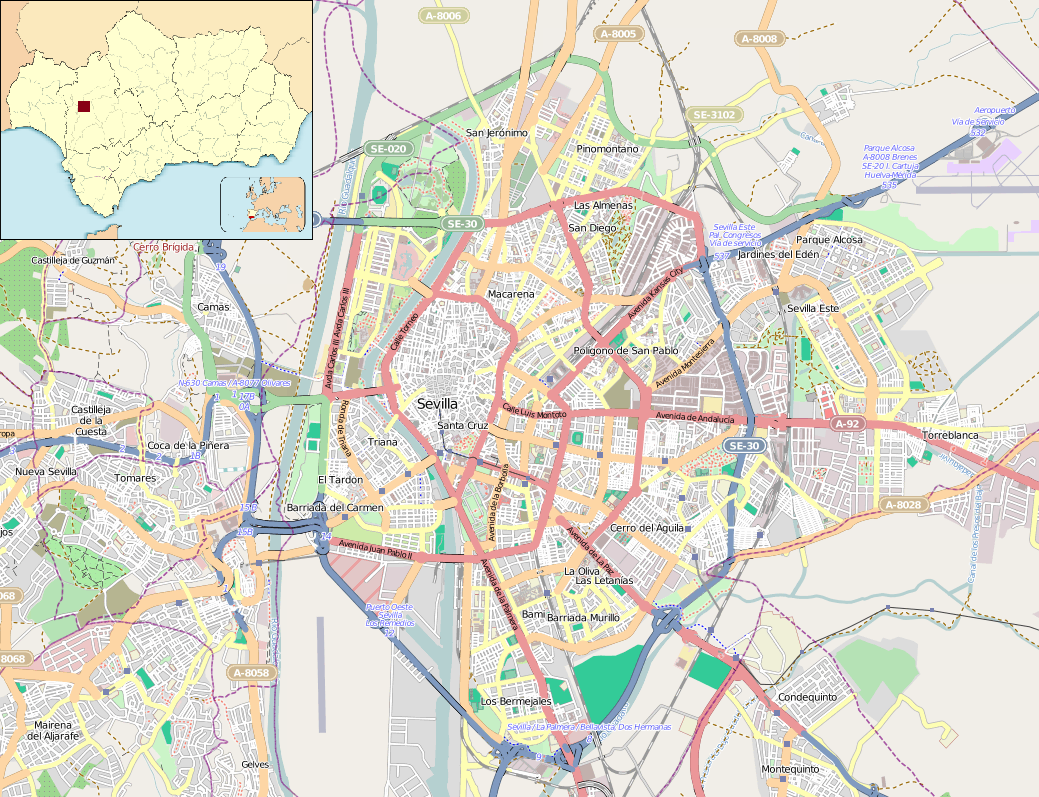

The Seville derby (Derbi Sevillano), also known as The Great Derby (El Gran Derbi), is the name of a local city derby located in Seville, Spain contested between Sevilla and Real Betis.

Sevilla FC were founded in 1890. This was followed in September 1907 by the city's second club 'Sevilla Balompié'. Following an internal split from Sevilla FC another club was formed, Betis Football Club. 1914 saw the culmination of a merger between Betis Football Club and Sevilla Balompié. With the patronage title, the club became Real Betis Balompié. On 8 October 1915, the first Seville derby took place, a 4–3 Sevilla victory. The first competitive derby between the sides took place on 19 February 1928, in a Copa del Rey game.

Sevilla are located in the richer Nervión district of Seville and play at the Estadio Ramón Sánchez Pizjuán while Real Betis play in the Heliopolis region at the Estadio Benito Villamarín and are backed more by the working class.

== Honours ==
Competition	Real Betis		Sevilla	
Competition	Total	Seasons	Total	Seasons
Primera; División	1	1934–35	1	1945–46
Copa del Rey	3	1976–77, 2004–05, 2021–22	5	1935, 1939, 1947–48, 2006–07, 2009–10
Supercopa de España	0		1	2007
Copa; Andalucía	1	1928	18	1917, 1919, 1920, 1921, 1922, 1923, 1924, 1925, 1926, 1927, 1929, 1930, 1931, 1932, 1933, 1936, 1939, 1940
UEFA Cup / UEFA Europa League	0		7	2005–06, 2006–07, 2013–14, 2014–15, 2015–16, 2019–20, 2022–23
UEFA Super; Cup	0		1	2006

== League matches ==
		Real Betis vs Sevilla				Sevilla vs Real Betis			
Season	Division	Date	Venue	Score	Attendance	Date	Venue	Score	Attendance
1928–29	Segunda División	16 Jun 1929	Estadio Benito Villamarín	2–1		7 Apr 1929	Estadio Ramón Sánchez Pizjuán	3–0	
1929–30	Segunda División	15 Dec 1929	Estadio Benito Villamarín	0–2		16 Feb 1930	Estadio Ramón Sánchez Pizjuán	2–0	
1930–31	Segunda División	22 Mar 1931	Estadio Benito Villamarín	0–1		11 Jan 1931	Estadio Ramón Sánchez Pizjuán	0–0	
1931–32	Segunda División	21 Feb 1932	Estadio Benito Villamarín	1–1		20 Dec 1931	Estadio Ramón Sánchez Pizjuán	2–3	
1934–35	Primera División	21 Apr 1935	Estadio Benito Villamarín	2–2		3 Mar 1936	Estadio Ramón Sánchez Pizjuán	0–3	
1935–36	Primera División	29 Dec 1935	Estadio Benito Villamarín	1–0		29 Mar 1936	Estadio Ramón Sánchez Pizjuán	1–0	
1939–40	Primera División	21 Jan 1940	Estadio Benito Villamarín	3–2		21 Jan 1940	Estadio Ramón Sánchez Pizjuán	4–3	
1942–43	Primera División	4 Oct 1942	Estadio Benito Villamarín	2–5		17 Jan 1943	Estadio Ramón Sánchez Pizjuán	5–0	
1958–59	Primera División	11 Jan 1959	Estadio Benito Villamarín	2–0		21 Sep 1958	Estadio Ramón Sánchez Pizjuán	2–4	
1959–60	Primera División	6 Mar 1960	Estadio Benito Villamarín	1–4		15 Nov 1959	Estadio Ramón Sánchez Pizjuán	2–1	
1960–61	Primera División	4 Dec 1960	Estadio Benito Villamarín	0–0		26 Mar 1961	Estadio Ramón Sánchez Pizjuán	1–1	
1961–62	Primera División	28 Jan 1962	Estadio Benito Villamarín	3–1		8 Oct 1961	Estadio Ramón Sánchez Pizjuán	1–2	
1962–63	Primera División	3 Feb 1963	Estadio Benito Villamarín	2–1		4 Nov 1962	Estadio Ramón Sánchez Pizjuán	2–0	
1963–64	Primera División	15 Aug 1963	Estadio Benito Villamarín	3–1		12 Jan 1964	Estadio Ramón Sánchez Pizjuán	3–1	
1964–65	Primera División	18 Oct 1964	Estadio Benito Villamarín	2–0		7 Feb 1965	Estadio Ramón Sánchez Pizjuán	4–2	
1965–66	Primera División	27 Mar 1966	Estadio Benito Villamarín	1–2		19 Dec 1965	Estadio Ramón Sánchez Pizjuán	1–1	
1967–68	Primera División	17 Mar 1968	Estadio Benito Villamarín	0–0		26 Nov 1967	Estadio Ramón Sánchez Pizjuán	2–3	
1968–69	Segunda División	18 May 1969	Estadio Benito Villamarín	2–2		29 Dec 1968	Estadio Ramón Sánchez Pizjuán	0–1	
1971–72	Primera División	19 Mar 1972	Estadio Benito Villamarín	1–1		14 Jan 1971	Estadio Ramón Sánchez Pizjuán	3–1	
1973–74	Segunda División	11 Nov 1973	Estadio Benito Villamarín	3–0		24 Mar 1974	Estadio Ramón Sánchez Pizjuán	2–1	
1975–76	Primera División	9 May 1976	Estadio Benito Villamarín	1–0		4 Jan 1976	Estadio Ramón Sánchez Pizjuán	2–0	
1976–77	Primera División	11 Sep 1976	Estadio Benito Villamarín	0–1		23 Jan 1977	Estadio Ramón Sánchez Pizjuán	3–2	
1977–78	Primera División	19 Mar 1978	Estadio Benito Villamarín	3–2		6 Nov 1977	Estadio Ramón Sánchez Pizjuán	1–0	
1979–80	Primera División	20 Apr 1980	Estadio Benito Villamarín	2–0		16 Dec 1979	Estadio Ramón Sánchez Pizjuán	2–1	76,567
1980–81	Primera División	14 Sep 1980	Estadio Benito Villamarín	2–0		14 Apr 1981	Estadio Ramón Sánchez Pizjuán	2–1	72,351
1981–82	Primera División	7 Oct 1981	Estadio Benito Villamarín	2–0		24 Jan 1982	Estadio Ramón Sánchez Pizjuán	1–1	65,576
1982–83	Primera División	2 Jan 1983	Estadio Benito Villamarín	1–2		1 May 1983	Estadio Ramón Sánchez Pizjuán	2–1	
1983–84	Primera División	9 Nov 1983	Estadio Benito Villamarín	1–0		18 Mar 1984	Estadio Ramón Sánchez Pizjuán	2–1	
1984–85	Primera División	28 Oct 1984	Estadio Benito Villamarín	1–2		18 Mar 1985	Estadio Ramón Sánchez Pizjuán	2–1	
1985–86	Primera División	23 Mar 1986	Estadio Benito Villamarín	1–0		24 Nov 1985	Estadio Ramón Sánchez Pizjuán	1–0	
1986–87	Primera División	21 Dec 1986	Estadio Benito Villamarín	0–0		7 Sep 1986	Estadio Ramón Sánchez Pizjuán	1–2	
1986–87	Primera División	7 Jun 1987	Estadio Benito Villamarín	1–2		3 May 1987	Estadio Ramón Sánchez Pizjuán	1–3	
1987–88	Primera División	30 Jan 1988	Estadio Benito Villamarín	0–1		30 Aug 1987	Estadio Ramón Sánchez Pizjuán	1–2	
1988–89	Primera División	27 Nov 1988	Estadio Benito Villamarín	1–3		7 May 1989	Estadio Ramón Sánchez Pizjuán	1–0	
1990–91	Primera División	30 Sep 1990	Estadio Benito Villamarín	0–3		2 Mar 1991	Estadio Ramón Sánchez Pizjuán	3–2	
1994–95	Primera División	10 Jun 1995	Estadio Benito Villamarín	2–1		21 Jan 1994	Estadio Ramón Sánchez Pizjuán	0–1	
1995–96	Primera División	15 Dec 1995	Estadio Benito Villamarín	1–1		27 Apr 1996	Estadio Ramón Sánchez Pizjuán	1–0	
1996–97	Primera División	16 May 1997	Estadio Benito Villamarín	3–3		21 Dec 1996	Estadio Ramón Sánchez Pizjuán	0–3	
1999–2000	Primera División	26 Feb 2000	Estadio Benito Villamarín	1–1		11 Oct 1999	Estadio Ramón Sánchez Pizjuán	3–0	
2000–01	Segunda División	19 Nov 2000	Estadio Benito Villamarín	1–3		22 Apr 2001	Estadio Ramón Sánchez Pizjuán	1–1	
2001–02	Primera División	23 Mar 2002	Estadio Benito Villamarín	0–0	50,000	10 Nov 2001	Estadio Ramón Sánchez Pizjuán	2–2	40,000
2002–03	Primera División	2 Mar 2003	Estadio Benito Villamarín	0–1	38,000	6 Oct 2002	Estadio Ramón Sánchez Pizjuán	1–1	
2003–04	Primera División	29 Feb 2004	Estadio Benito Villamarín	1–1	37,000	19 Oct 2003	Estadio Ramón Sánchez Pizjuán	2–2	
2004–05	Primera División	7 May 2005	Estadio Benito Villamarín	1–0	50,000	19 Dec 2004	Estadio Ramón Sánchez Pizjuán	2–1	46,000
2005–06	Primera División	2 Apr 2006	Estadio Benito Villamarín	2–1	45,000	19 Nov 2005	Estadio Ramón Sánchez Pizjuán	1–0	45,000
2006–07	Primera División	10 Feb 2007	Estadio Benito Villamarín	0–0	45,000	17 Sep 2006	Estadio Ramón Sánchez Pizjuán	3–2	45,000
2007–08	Primera División	11 May 2008	Estadio Benito Villamarín	0–2	45,000	6 Jan 2008	Estadio Ramón Sánchez Pizjuán	3–0	45,000
2008–09	Primera División	21 Sep 2008	Estadio Benito Villamarín	0–0	55,500	7 Feb 2009	Estadio Ramón Sánchez Pizjuán	1–2	45,500
2011–12	Primera División	21 Jan 2012	Estadio Benito Villamarín	1–1	44,585	2 May 2012	Estadio Ramón Sánchez Pizjuán	1–2	45,000
2012–13	Primera División	12 Apr 2013	Estadio Benito Villamarín	3–3	51,309	18 Nov 2012	Estadio Ramón Sánchez Pizjuán	5–1	45,000
2013–14	Primera División	13 Apr 2014	Estadio Benito Villamarín	0–2	32,254	23 Nov 2013	Estadio Ramón Sánchez Pizjuán	4–0	45,000
2015–16	Primera División	19 Dec 2015	Estadio Benito Villamarín	0–0	50,073	24 Apr 2016	Estadio Ramón Sánchez Pizjuán	2–0	39,523
2016–17	Primera División	25 Feb 2017	Estadio Benito Villamarín	1–2	37,110	20 Sep 2016	Estadio Ramón Sánchez Pizjuán	1–0	39,870
2017–18	Primera División	12 May 2018	Estadio Benito Villamarín	2–2	55,588	6 Jan 2018	Estadio Ramón Sánchez Pizjuán	3–5	40,385
2018–19	Primera División	2 Sep 2018	Estadio Benito Villamarín	1–0	53,451	13 Apr 2019	Estadio Ramón Sánchez Pizjuán	3–2	42,885
2019–20	Primera División	10 Nov 2019	Estadio Benito Villamarín	1–2	53,110	11 Jun 2020	Estadio Ramón Sánchez Pizjuán	2–0	0 (Note: Match played behind closed doors due to the COVID-19 pandemic in Spain.)
2020–21	Primera División	2 Jan 2021	Estadio Benito Villamarín	1–1	0	14 Mar 2021	Estadio Ramón Sánchez Pizjuán	1–0	0
2021–22	Primera División	7 Nov 2021	Estadio Benito Villamarín	0–2	50,534	27 Feb 2022	Estadio Ramón Sánchez Pizjuán	2–1	37,250
2022–23	Primera División	6 Nov 2022	Estadio Benito Villamarín	1–1	54,034	21 May 2023	Estadio Ramón Sánchez Pizjuán	0–0	41,392
2023–24	Primera División	28 Apr 2024	Estadio Benito Villamarín	1–1	55,770	12 Nov 2023	Estadio Ramón Sánchez Pizjuán	1–1	42,222
2024–25	Primera División	30 Mar 2025	Estadio Benito Villamarín	2–1	58,538	6 Oct 2024	Estadio Ramón Sánchez Pizjuán	1–0	42,571
2025–26	Primera División	1 March 2026	Estadio de La Cartuja	2–2	67,447	30 Nov 2025	Estadio Ramón Sánchez Pizjuán	0–2	42,580

== Cup matches ==
Season	Competition	Round	Date	Stadium	Home team	Result	Away team	Attendance	Outcome
1927–28	Copa del Rey	Group stage	19 Feb 1928	Estadio Ramón Sánchez Pizjuán	Sevilla	3–3	Real Betis		N/A
1927–28	Copa del Rey	Group stage	25 Feb 1928	Estadio Benito Villamarín	Real Betis	1–1	Sevilla		N/A
1939–40	Copa del Generalísimo	Round of 16 first leg	23 May 1940	Estadio Benito Villamarín	Real Betis	0–3	Sevilla		Sevilla won 5–3 on aggregate
1939–40	Copa del Generalísimo	Round of 16 second leg	26 May 1940	Estadio Ramón Sánchez Pizjuán	Sevilla	2–3	Real Betis		Sevilla won 5–3 on aggregate
1961–62	Copa del Generalísimo	Round of 16 first leg	5 Apr 1962	Estadio Ramón Sánchez Pizjuán	Sevilla	5–3	Real Betis		Sevilla won 5–4 on aggregate
1961–62	Copa del Generalísimo	Round of 16 second leg	08 Apr 1962	Estadio Benito Villamarín	Real Betis	1–0	Sevilla		Sevilla won 5–4 on aggregate
1962–63	Copa del Generalísimo	Round of 16 first leg	5 Apr 1962	Estadio Benito Villamarín	Real Betis	2–1	Sevilla		Real Betis won 3–2 on aggregate
1962–63	Copa del Generalísimo	Round of 16 second leg	08 Apr 1962	Estadio Ramón Sánchez Pizjuán	Sevilla	1–1	Real Betis		Real Betis won 3–2 on aggregate
1980–81	Copa del Rey	Second Round first leg	19 Nov 1980	Estadio Ramón Sánchez Pizjuán	Sevilla	2–1	Real Betis		Sevilla won 3–2 on aggregate
1980–81	Copa del Rey	Second Round second leg	03 Dec 1980	Estadio Benito Villamarín	Real Betis	1–1	Sevilla		Sevilla won 3–2 on aggregate
1982-83	Copa del Rey	Round of 16 first leg	2 Feb 1983	Estadio Ramón Sánchez Pizjuán	Sevilla	2–0	Real Betis		Sevilla won 4–0 on aggregate
1982-83	Copa del Rey	Round of 16 second leg	23 Feb 1983	Estadio Benito Villamarín	Real Betis	0–2	Sevilla		Sevilla won 4–0 on aggregate
1984–85	Copa del Rey	Third Round first leg	11 Dec 1984	Estadio Ramón Sánchez Pizjuán	Sevilla	1–0	Real Betis		Real Betis won 3–1 on aggregate
1984–85	Copa del Rey	Third Round second leg	08 Jan 1985	Estadio Benito Villamarín	Real Betis	3–0	Sevilla		Real Betis won 3–1 on aggregate
2006–07	Copa del Rey	Quarter-finals first leg	1 Feb 2007	Estadio Ramón Sánchez Pizjuán	Sevilla	0–0	Real Betis		Sevilla won 1–0 on aggregate
2006–07	Copa del Rey	Quarter-finals second leg	20 Mar 2007	Estadio Benito Villamarín	Real Betis	0–1	Sevilla		Sevilla won 1–0 on aggregate
2015–16	Copa del Rey	Quarter-finals first leg	6 Jan 2016	Estadio Benito Villamarín	Real Betis	0–2	Sevilla	36,832	Sevilla won 6–0 on aggregate
2015–16	Copa del Rey	Quarter-finals second leg	12 Jan 2016	Estadio Ramón Sánchez Pizjuán	Sevilla	4–0	Real Betis	36,812	Sevilla won 6–0 on aggregate
2021–22	Copa del Rey	Round of 16	15–16 Jan 2022	Estadio Benito Villamarín	Real Betis	2–1	Sevilla	0 (Note: Match started on 15 January with spectators but then was suspended at the 40th minute after Sevilla player Joan Jordán was hit by an object thrown from the crowd. It was resumed behind closed doors the following day.)	Real Betis won 2–1

== European matches ==
Season	Competition	Round	Date	Stadium	Home team	Result	Away team	Attendance	Outcome
2013–14	Europa League	Round of 16 first leg	13 Mar 2014	Estadio Ramón Sánchez Pizjuán	Sevilla	0–2	Real Betis	43,000	Sevilla won 4–3 on penalties after finishing 2–2 on aggregate
2013–14	Europa League	Round of 16 second leg	20 Mar 2014	Estadio Benito Villamarín	Real Betis	0–2	Sevilla	48,000	Sevilla won 4–3 on penalties after finishing 2–2 on aggregate

== Head-to-head results ==
As of 1 March 2026

Competition	Matches	Betis wins	Draws	Sevilla wins	Betis goals	Sevilla goals
Primera División	109	32	27	50	129	162
Segunda División	14	4	4	6	15	20
Copa del Rey/Copa del Generalísimo	19	5	5	9	21	32
UEFA Europa League	2	1	0	1	2	2
Overall	144	42	36	66	167	216

== Head-to-head ranking in La Liga (1929–2026) ==
P.	29	30	31	32	33	34	35	36	40	41	42	43	44	45	46	47	48	49	50	51	52	53	54	55	56	57	58	59	60	61	62	63	64	65	66	67	68	69	70	71	72	73	74	75	76	77	78	79	80	81	82	83	84	85	86	87	88	89	90	91	92	93	94	95	96	97	98	99	00	01	02	03	04	05	06	07	08	09	10	11	12	13	14	15	16	17	18	19	20	21	22	23	24	25	26
1							1								1																																																																																
2									2			2								2						2																																																																					
3													3																				3						3																									3												3		3																	
4						4																		4	4				4																																					4								4					4							4			4	4	4				
5					5		5			5							5					5	5																							5			5			5	5											5											5		5			5			5	5							5				5
6											6					6					6							6		6	6																			6	6								6				6								6		6	6													6	6		6		6		6	
7								7																					7											7					7						7											7																				7			7		7						7		
8																		8																	8												8		8	8			8		8	8				8					8		8				8	8																							
9								9																							9	9	9											9											9	9		9															9								9	9													
10														10					10								10							10												10											10															10													10			10							
11									11																					11		11													11			11				11																11																											
12																												12						12																				12							12				12																											12			
13																																				13					13																																				13				13														13
14												14																																										14																					14																		14		
15																																					15																																																	15			15						
16																																			16		16				16	16					16										16																			16																			
17																																																																																														17	
18																																																										18											18									18																	
19																																																																																															
20																																																												20						20			20														20												
21																																																																																															
22																																																																																															

• Total: Sevilla with 50 higher finishes, Betis with 32 higher finishes (as of the end of the 2025–26 season).

== Goalscorer records ==
Only official matches in all competitions played between the two teams are counted, including La Liga, Copa del Rey, and the UEFA Europa League. Regional competitions are not counted.

Player	Team(s)	La Liga goals	Copa del Rey goals	UEFA Europa League goals	Total goals
(Spain) Miguel Torrontegui	Sevilla	4	3	–	7
(Spain) Julio Cardeñosa	Real Betis	6	1	–	7
(Spain) Luis Aragonés	Real Betis	4	2	–	6
(Spain) Raimundo Blanco	Sevilla	4	1	–	5
(Spain) José Antonio Reyes	Sevilla	3	1	1	5
(Croatia) Ivan Rakitić	Sevilla	5	–	–	5
(Spain) Rafael Berrocal	Sevilla	4	–	–	4
(Spain) Antonio Pallarés	Real Betis	4	–	–	4
(Spain) Ramón	Sevilla	4	–	–	4
(Mali) Frédéric Kanouté	Sevilla	3	1	–	4
(France) Kevin Gameiro	Sevilla	3	1	–	4

- **Bold** denotes players still playing for either of the two teams.
