= 1939 Copa del Generalísimo final =

Copa del Generalísimo 1939 final
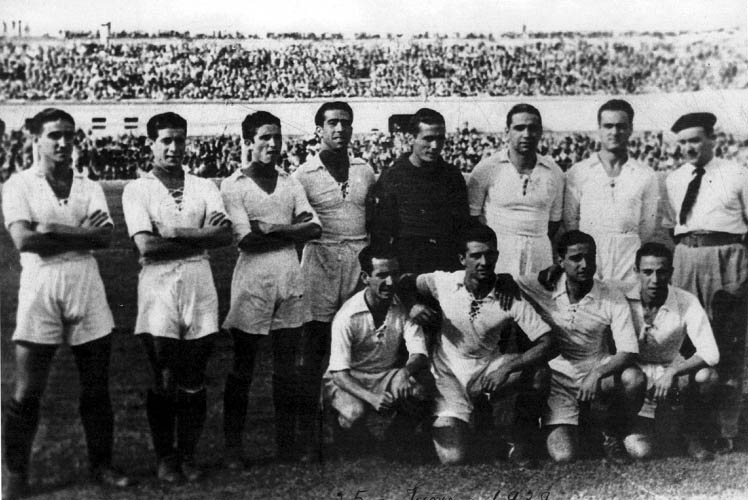
- Sevilla FC, champions
- Event: 1939 Copa del Generalísimo
Sevilla	Racing de Ferrol
6	2
- Date: 25 June 1939
- Venue: Montjuïc, Barcelona
- Referee: Jesús Arribas
- Attendance: 60,000

The Copa del Generalísimo 1939 final was the 37th final of the King's Cup. The final was played at Montjuïc in Barcelona, on 25 June 1939, being won by Sevilla FC, who beat Racing Club de Ferrol 6-2.

== Match details ==
25 June 1939
17:30 CET

Sevilla	6–2	Racing de Ferrol
Raimundo 5'; Campanal 20', 27', 59'; Pepillo 38', 42'	Report	Silvosa 54' (pen.), 57'

Montjuïc, Barcelona
Attendance: 60,000
Referee: Jesús Arribas

Sevilla
Racing de Ferrol

'
GK	1	(Spain) Manuel Bueno
DF	2	(Spain) José Cayuso
DF	3	(Spain) Diego Villalonga
MF	4	(Spain) Miguel Torrontegui
MF	5	(Spain) Félix
MF	6	(Spain) Leoncito
FW	7	(Spain) Pepe López
FW	8	(Spain) Pepillo
FW	9	(Spain) Campanal (c)
FW	10	(Spain) Raimundo
FW	11	(Spain) Rafael Berrocal
Manager:
(Spain) Pepe Brand

GK	1	(Hungary) Gyula Alberty
DF	2	(Spain) Caliche
DF	3	(Spain) Moreno (c)
MF	4	(Spain) Inocencio Bertolí
MF	5	(Spain) José Silvosa
MF	6	(Spain) Pedro Basterrechea
FW	7	(Spain) Lelé
FW	8	(Spain) Ricardo Gallart
FW	9	(Spain) Paco Barón
FW	10	(Spain) Edelmiro
FW	11	(Spain) Portugués
Manager:
(Spain) José Planas
