= Joaquín Jiménez =

Spanish footballer

Personal information
- Full name: Joaquín Jiménez Postigo
- Date of birth: 18 April 1918
- Place of birth: Alcalá de Guadaíra, Sevilla, Spain
- Date of death: 6 October 2005 (aged 87)
- Place of death: Spain
- Position: Defender

Youth career
- Once Diablos

Senior career*
Years	Team	Apps	(Gls)
1933–1934	Once Diablos		
1934–1935	Real Betis		
1935–1949	Sevilla	234	(1)
- * Club domestic league appearances and goals

Joaquín Jiménez Postigo, better known as Joaquín (18 April 1918 – 6 October 2005), was a Spanish footballer who played as a defender for Real Betis and Sevilla in the 1930s and 1940s. He is the only footballer to have won La Liga with Betis and Sevilla. He is also considered one of the best full-backs of the Seville.

== Early life ==
Born on 18 April 1918 in Alcalá de Guadaíra, Sevilla, Joaquín spent his childhood in the San Juan mill, which his family ran on the banks of the Guadaíra river.

== Playing career ==
Joaquín began his football career at his hometown team Once Diablos, where he quickly stood out from the rest, thus being signed by Betis, making his debut on 8 December 1934, aged 16, in a friendly match against Xerez, which ended in a 4–0 loss. He went on to play several matches in the Copa del Rey, and even though he never made his league debut due to his young age, and also because no substitutions were not allowed at the time, Joaquín is nonetheless considered one of the winners of the 1934–35 La Liga title, the first (and only) league title in the history of Betis. Perhaps unsatisfied with his lack of playing time, and following the advice of his brother-in-law, Ángel Oliveros, he left Betis at the end of the season to join Sevilla FC in 1935, which paid off, since in his opening season, the 17-year-old Joaquín played in all the matches of the league. Joaquín remained loyal to the club for 15 years, from 1935 until 1950, always featuring as a starter for the first time.

Together with Diego Villalonga and goalkeeper José María Busto, he was a member of one of the best defensive lines in the entire history of the club, which was the driving force behind the Sevilla team that won the last three editions of the Andalusian championship (1935–36, 1938–39, and 1939–40), and two Copa del Rey titles in 1939 and 1948; he did not start in the former final against Racing de Ferrol due to an untimely injury against Deportivo Alavés in the semifinals, but he later redeemed himself by starting as the captain in the 1948 final at Chamartín, where he helped his side to a 4–1 win over Celta de Vigo before lifting the trophy. In the league, Seville were runners-up twice (1939–40 and 1942–43) before finally winning it in 1945–46, where he was once again fundamental as he played every minute of the competition. The title was only decided on the last matchday of the league, against FC Barcelona at Les Corts, with Joaquín helping his team to held Barça to a 1–1 draw. In doing so, he became the first footballer to have won La Liga with Betis and Sevilla, a feat that is still unmatched.

In total, Joaquín scored 1 goal in 234 La Liga matches, and overall, he played 280 official matches for Seville, an impressive tally for a time when the league only had 26 matches, not to mention the three-year hiatus caused by the Spanish Civil War. He was called up to the Spain national team on several occasions, but he never made an international debut. The local press sometimes recognized him as the right-back that "our team deserved", and the newspaper Marca once described him as "the best defender in Spain" in 1946.

== Managerial career ==
After his career as a player ended, Joaquín remained closely linked to Sevilla, accepting the club's offer to be the second coach as well as the team's physical trainer, and in that first year, the club also registered him as a player in case of an emergency, which did not happen. He remained as assistant coach for eleven years, from 1950 until 1961, when he decided to leave the position due to ethical reasons, as his nephew Ángel Oliveros had just arrived in the first team. In total, he remained linked to Sevilla for 20 consecutive seasons.

== Death ==
Joaquín died on 6 October 2005, at the age of 87.

== Honours ==
Real Betis

- La Liga
  - Champions (1): 1934–35

Sevilla FC

- Andalusian championship:
  - Champions (3): 1936, 1939, and 1940
- La Liga
  - Champions (1): 1945–46
  - Runner-up (2): 1939–40 and 1942–43
- Copa del Rey:
  - Champions (2): 1939 and 1948
