= 2018 Copa del Rey final =

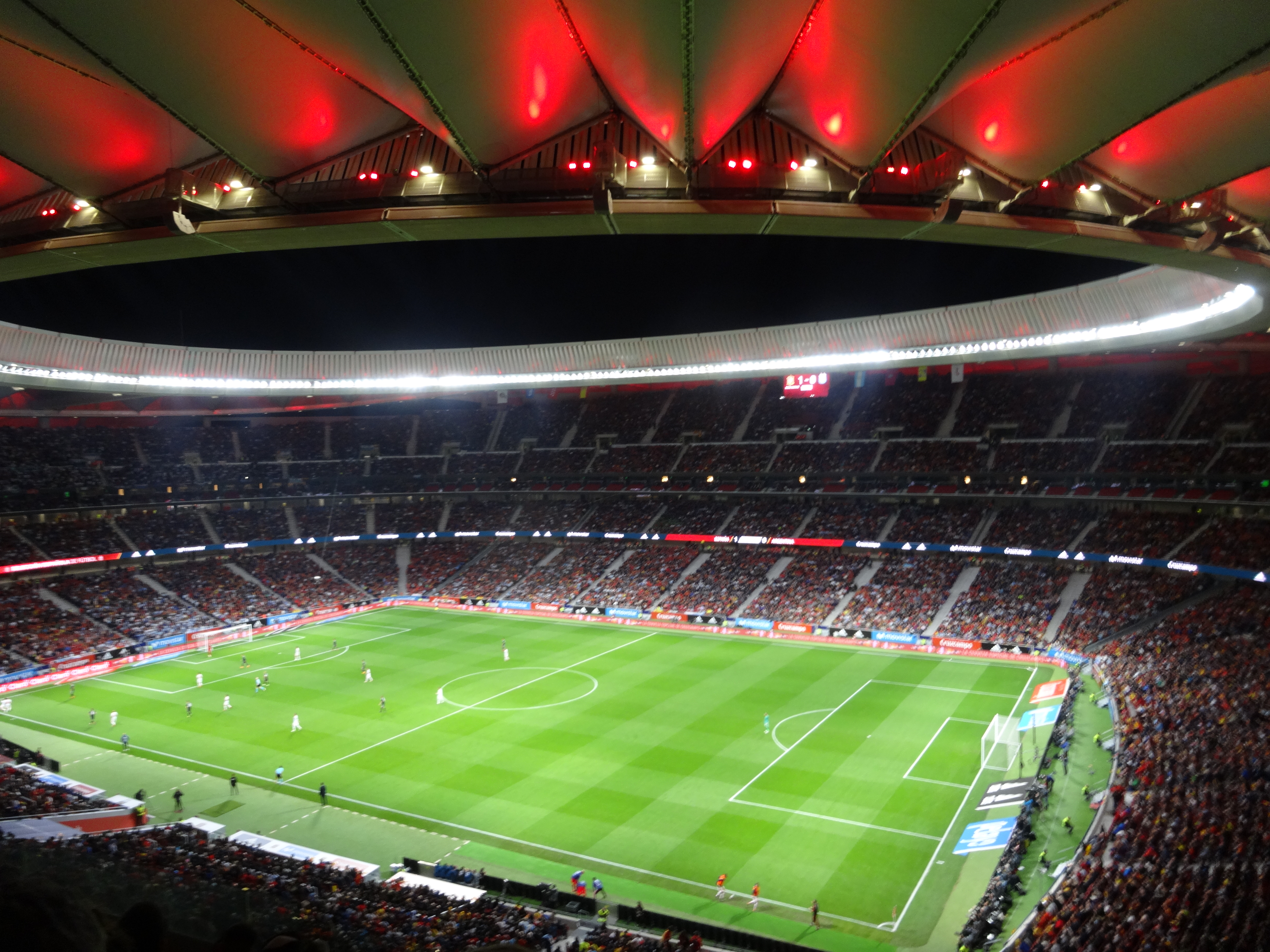
- Metropolitano Stadium in Madrid hosted the final
- Event: 2017–18 Copa del Rey
Sevilla	Barcelona
0	5
- Date: 21 April 2018
- Venue: Metropolitano Stadium, Madrid
- Man of the Match: Andrés Iniesta (Barcelona)
- Referee: Jesús Gil Manzano
- Attendance: 62,623
- Weather: Clear; 11 °C (52 °F); 82% humidity

The 2018 Copa del Rey final was an Association football match played on 21 April 2018 to decide the winner of the 2017–18 Copa del Rey, the 116th edition of Spain's primary football cup (including two seasons where two rival editions were played).

The match was between Sevilla and Barcelona at the Metropolitano Stadium in Madrid. As of 2025, this was the latest final to be held outside of the city of Seville.

Barcelona won the final 5–0 for their fourth consecutive and a record-extending 30th overall Copa del Rey title.

== Background ==
Barcelona were competing in their 40th Copa del Rey final, extending the record of 39 which they previously shared with Real Madrid, having won 29 titles prior, a competition record. They were the reigning champions, having defeated Deportivo Alavés 3–1 in the earlier 2017 final at the Vicente Calderón in Madrid. This was their fifth consecutive final, a feat never accomplished before, and were seeking a fourth consecutive title, a record shared by Real Madrid (1905, 1906, 1907, 1908) and Athletic Bilbao (1930, 1931, 1932, 1933).

Sevilla were competing in their ninth Copa del Rey final, having won a total of five titles prior (1935, 1939, 1948, 2007 and 2010).

The pairing was a rematch from the 2016 final, where Barcelona won 2–0 after extra time.

== Route to the final ==
Sevilla			Round	Barcelona
Opponent	Result	Legs		Opponent	Result	Legs
Cartagena	7–0	3–0 away; 4–0 home	Round of 32	Murcia	8–0	3–0 away; 5–0 home
Cádiz	4–1	2–0 away; 2–1 home	Round of 16	Celta Vigo	6–1	1–1 away; 5–0 home
Atlético Madrid	5–2	2–1 away; 3–1 home	Quarter-finals	Espanyol	2–1	0–1 away; 2–0 home
Leganés	3–1	1–1 away; 2–0 home	Semi-finals	Valencia	3–0	1–0 home; 2–0 away

== Match ==
=== Details ===
21 April 2018
21:30 CEST

Sevilla	0–5	Barcelona
	Report	L. Suárez 14', 40'; Messi 31'; Iniesta 52'; Coutinho 69' (pen.)

Metropolitano Stadium, Madrid
Attendance: 62,623
Referee: Jesús Gil Manzano

Sevilla	Barcelona

GK	13	(Spain) David Soria
RB	16	(Spain) Jesús Navas
CB	25	(Argentina) Gabriel Mercado	(yellow card) 34'
CB	5	(France) Clément Lenglet
LB	18	(Spain) Sergio Escudero (c)	(yellow card) 38'
CM	15	(France) Steven Nzonzi
CM	10	(Argentina) Éver Banega
RW	17	(Spain) Pablo Sarabia		(substituted off) 82'
AM	22	(Italy) Franco Vázquez	(yellow card) 74'	(substituted off) 86'
LW	11	(Argentina) Joaquín Correa		(substituted off) 46'
CF	20	(Colombia) Luis Muriel
Substitutes:
GK	1	(Spain) Sergio Rico
DF	3	(Mexico) Miguel Layún		(substituted on) 82'
DF	6	(Portugal) Daniel Carriço
MF	14	(Argentina) Guido Pizarro
FW	9	(France) Wissam Ben Yedder
FW	23	(Spain) Sandro Ramírez		(substituted on) 46'
FW	24	(Spain) Nolito		(substituted on) 86'
Manager:
(Italy) Vincenzo Montella

GK	13	(Netherlands) Jasper Cillessen
RB	20	(Spain) Sergi Roberto
CB	3	(Spain) Gerard Piqué
CB	23	(France) Samuel Umtiti
LB	18	(Spain) Jordi Alba
RM	14	(Brazil) Philippe Coutinho		(substituted off) 82'
CM	4	(Croatia) Ivan Rakitić
CM	5	(Spain) Sergio Busquets	(yellow card) 74'	(substituted off) 76'
LM	8	(Spain) Andrés Iniesta (c)	(yellow card) 67'	(substituted off) 88'
CF	10	(Argentina) Lionel Messi
CF	9	(Uruguay) Luis Suárez
Substitutes:
GK	1	(Germany) Marc-André ter Stegen
DF	2	(Portugal) Nélson Semedo
DF	25	(Belgium) Thomas Vermaelen
MF	6	(Spain) Denis Suárez		(substituted on) 88'
MF	15	(Brazil) Paulinho		(substituted on) 76'
FW	11	(France) Ousmane Dembélé		(substituted on) 82'
FW	17	(Spain) Paco Alcácer
Manager:
(Spain) Ernesto Valverde

Man of the Match:
Andrés Iniesta (Barcelona)

Assistant referees:
Ángel Nevado Rodríguez
Juan Carlos Yuste Jiménez
Fourth official:
Carlos del Cerro Grande
Reserve assistant referee:
Roberto Alonso Fernández

Match rules

- 90 minutes
- 30 minutes of extra time if necessary
- Penalty shoot-out if scores still level
- Seven named substitutes, of which up to three may be used
