= Campanal =

Campanal may refer to either:

- Campanal I, Spanish footballer (full name: Guillermo González del Río García)
- Campanal II, Spanish footballer (full name: Marcelino Vaquero González)
