= Gyula Alberty =

Hungarian footballer (1903–1942)

Personal information
- Full name: Gyula Alberty Kiszel
- Date of birth: 24 April 1903
- Place of birth: Debrecen, Hungary
- Date of death: 9 April 1942 (aged 38)
- Place of death: Granada, Spain
- Position: Goalkeeper

Senior career*
Years	Team	Apps	(Gls)
1934–1936	Real Madrid	20	(0)
1936–1938	Le Havre		
1938	Real Unión	0	(0)
1938–1939	Racing de Ferrol	5	(0)
1939–1941	Celta de Vigo	34	
1941–1942	Granada	34	
- * Club domestic league appearances and goals

Gyula Alberty Kiszel (24 April 1903 – 9 April 1942) was a Hungarian footballer who played as a goalkeeper for Real Madrid. He is best known for being the first foreign professional footballer to debut with the Madrid club's shirt.

== Club career ==
Born in Debrecen, Hungary, Alberty Kiszel started out as a goalkeeper for Boksai Sport Club in his hometown, but in 1934, at the age of twenty-three, Real Madrid brought him to Spain, thus becoming the first foreign professional footballer to debut with the white's shirt. He arrived at Real Madrid to take over from another legendary goalkeeper, Ricardo Zamora, already at the end of his active career. He played two seasons for the Madrid team for a total of twenty league games. He also helped the club win the Copa del Rey once, in 1936. He delighted locals and strangers with his style, making impossible interventions under the goal and getting out of his frame with great confidence and courage.

After the outbreak of the Spanish Civil War, he signed for the French side Le Havre, where he played two seasons (1936–37 and 1937–38). When the war ended, he returned to Spain where he had a brief stint at Real Unión, where he spent a few months before joining Racing Club de Ferrol, a club with which he came to play the final of the 1939 Copa del Generalísimo against Sevilla FC, in which he conceded six goals in a 6–2 loss, including a hat-trick from Campanal I.

In the summer of 1939, he signed for Celta de Vigo, where he played for two seasons. In his first year in Vigo, Alberty's great performances helped Celta stay in the top flight, and in his second season he once again played a crucial role to save Celta from relegation. Alberty adapted to Vigo with ease, so much indeed, that in 1941, after leaving the club, he set up a cafeteria business on Calle Colón, called the Bar Club, where Celta's offices would later be located. In 1941, he was transferred to Granada, recently promoted to the Spanish top flight. He quickly captivated the fans with his stops and curious customs such as eating oranges during games or squeezing them to drink their juice.

In the spring of 1942, Alberty fell ill. He started having stomach pains and had to have surgery. He was forced to retire due to his illness, typhoid fever, which was the cause of his death just a month later, on 9 April 1942, at the age of thirty, in the Purísima sanatorium, accompanied by family members and Paco Bru. Some sources suggest that the cause of his premature death could have been an injury caused by Sevilla's Campanal tackles in a previous match.

== Honours ==
Real Madrid

- Centro Regional Championship: 1935–36
- Copa del Rey: 1934, 1936

Racing de Ferrol

- Copa del Rey: 1939
