= Diego Villalonga =

Spanish footballer and manager (1917–1986)

Personal information
- Full name: Diego Villalonga Montoya
- Date of birth: 16 February 1917
- Place of birth: Utrera, Spain
- Date of death: 20 December 1986 (aged 69)
- Place of death: Spain
- Position: Defender

Senior career*
Years	Team	Apps	(Gls)
?–1935	Cultural Utrerana		
1935–1936	Sevilla		
1938–1948	Sevilla		
1948–1949	Cádiz		

Managerial career
- 1951–1952: Recreativo de Huelva
- 1954–1956: Cádiz
- 1956–1957: Deportivo de La Coruña
- 1957–1958: Sevilla
- 1958–1960: Almería
- 1960: Cádiz
- 1961: Sevilla
- 1962–1963: Sevilla Atlético
- 1963–1964: Atlético Ceuta
- 1971: Sevilla
- 1971–1972: Xerez
- * Club domestic league appearances and goals

Diego Villalonga Montoya (16 February 1917 – 20 December 1986) was a Spanish footballer who played as a defender for Sevilla in the 1940s. After retiring, he became a manager, taking over the likes of Deportivo de La Coruña, Xerez, and Sevilla on three occasions.

== Career ==
Born on 16 February 1917 in the Sevilla town of Utrera, Villalonga began his career at his hometown club Cultural Utrerana, which had been founded in December 1929. In 1935, he signed for Sevilla, with whom he played for 13 seasons, until 1948. His on-field courage earned him the nickname of Diego Valor ("Diego Worth"), a reference to the hero of the radio serial of the 1950s.

Together with Joaquín Jiménez and goalkeeper José María Busto, he was a member of one of the best defensive lines in the history of the club, which was the driving force behind the Sevilla team that won the last three editions of the Andalusian championship (1935–36, 1938–39, and 1939–40), and two Copa del Rey titles in 1939 and 1948, starting in the former final, which ended in a 6–2 win over Racing de Ferrol. In the league, Seville were runners-up twice (1939–40 and 1942–43) before finally winning it in 1945–46.

In total, Villalonga played 135 official matches for Sevilla, including 119 La Liga matches. After leaving Sevilla in 1948, he signed for Cádiz, with whom he played for two years, until 1950, performing at a high level.

== Managerial career ==
After retiring, Villalonga became a manager, overseeing Recreativo de Huelva in the 1951–52 season. In 1954, he took over his former club Cádiz, and in his first season there, he led the club to a promotion to the Segunda División, thus ending a 13-year stay in Tercera División. Following a brief stint at the helm of Deportivo de La Coruña (1956–57), he became the coach of Sevilla for the first time, leading the team in 15 matches during the 1957–58 season, including the quarter-finals of the 1957–58 European Cup against Real Madrid. It was the first time two sides from the same country played against each other in the competition, with the first leg at the Santiago Bernabéu ending in a resounding 8–0 loss, courtesy of a poker from Alfredo Di Stéfano.

In 1958, Villalonga took over Almería, which he oversaw for two years, after which he went on to have a second stint at both Cádiz (1960) and Sevilla (1961). He also coached Sevilla Atlético in the 1962–63 season and Xerez in 1971. Villalonga also had brief stints at the helm of Algeciras, Coria, Alcalá, and Jerez Deportivo. In 1968, he became the technical secretary of Sevilla, a position that he held for two years, until 1970. In 1970–71, Villalonga replaced Max Merkel on the last matchday of the season, and in 1971–72, he replaced Dan Georgiadis for two games.

== Death ==
Villalonga died on 20 December 1986, at the age of 69.

== Honours ==
Sevilla FC

- Andalusian championship:
  - Champions (3): 1936, 1939, and 1940
- La Liga
  - Champions (1): 1945–46
  - Runner-up (2): 1939–40 and 1942–43
- Copa del Rey:
  - Champions (2): 1939 and 1948
