= Ángel Calvet =

Spanish footballer (1909–??)

Personal information
- Full name: Ángel Antonio Calvet Martí
- Date of birth: 24 May 1909
- Place of birth: Barcelona, Catalonia, Spain
- Date of death: Unknown
- Position: Forward

Senior career*
Years	Team	Apps	(Gls)
1927–1930	UE Sants		
1930–1931	CE Europa		
1931–1937	Sabadell FC		

International career
1929–1932	Catalonia	4	(3)
- * Club domestic league appearances and goals

Ángel Antonio Calvet Martí (24 May 1909 – Unknown) was a Spanish footballer who played as a forward for CE Europa and Sabadell FC.

A historical member of Sabadell in the 1930s, he played with them for seven years, and under his captainancy, he led the club to its first and only Copa del Rey final in 1935.

== Club career ==
Born in Barcelona, Catalonia, Calvet began playing football at his hometown club UE Sants in 1927, at the age of 18, where he stood out and after three seasons, he was signed by CE Europa in 1930, with whom he made his debut in La Liga, netting three goals in 16 matches there, including an equalizer against FC Barcelona on 14 December 1930 in an eventual 2–2 draw, which was not enough to avoid relegation to the Segunda División. He mainly played as a right inside half, although he also played as a center forward.

In July 1931, Calvet arrived at Sabadell, where he occupied the center forward position, excelling as a goalscorer, although with the arrival of Miquel Gual, he was moved to the inside right. As the captain of Sabadell, he played a crucial in helping the club win the 1933–34 Catalan Championship, Sabadell's first-ever piece of silverware, and then led his side to the final of the 1935 Spanish Cup, which ended in a 0–3 loss to Sevilla FC. He stayed loyal to the club until 1937, when the Spanish Civil War broke out.

== International career ==
As a Sabadell player, Calvet was eligible to play for the Catalan national team, making his debut against RCD Espanyol in a tribute match to Patricio Caicedo on 17 March 1929, which ended in a 1–5 loss. On 25 August 1929, Calvet earned his second cap for Catalonia against Gràcia FC in a tribute match to Bruno, the popular caretaker of Gràcia, helping his side to a 5–2 win. On 9 August 1931, Calvet scored twice against his former club UE Sants in a tribute match to Jesús Pedret to help Catalonia to a 5–2 win. On 16 May 1932, he scored again against UE Sants to help Catalonia to a 2–0 win in a tribute match to Carles Oliveras.

On 14 July 1929, Calvet played against Catalonia for UE Sants in a tribute match to Josep Guixà, scoring the opening goal in an eventual 3–4 loss to a Catalan which fielded his older brother, who played at FC Martinenc. On 24 June 1933, Calvet played for Sabadell against Catalonia in a tribute match to the defense of the local Giner team, netting once to help his side to a 4–2 win.

== Death ==
Calvet died very young, in the late thirties or early forties.

== Honours ==
Sabadell FC

- Catalan Championship: 1933–34
- Copa del Rey runner-up: 1935
