= 1955 Copa del Generalísimo final =

Copa del Generalísimo 1955 final
- Event: 1955 Copa del Generalísimo
Atlético Bilbao	Sevilla
1	0
- Date: 5 June 1955
- Venue: Estadio Chamartín, Madrid
- Referee: Julián Arqué
- Attendance: 100,000

The Copa del Generalísimo 1955 final was the 53rd final of the King's Cup. The final was played at Estadio Chamartín in Madrid, on 5 June 1955, being won by Atlético de Bilbao, who beat Sevilla CF 1–0.

== Match details ==
5 June 1955
17:30 CET

Atlético Bilbao	1–0	Sevilla
Uribe 70'	Report

Santiago Bernabéu Stadium, Madrid
Attendance: 100,000
Referee: Julián Arqué

Athletic Bilbao

Sevilla

GK	1	(Spain) Carmelo Cedrún
DF	2	(Spain) José Orúe
DF	3	(Spain) Jesús Garay
DF	4	(Spain) José Artetxe
MF	5	(Spain) José María Maguregui
MF	6	(Spain) Mauri
FW	7	(Spain) Ignacio Azkarate
FW	8	(Spain) Félix Markaida
FW	9	(Spain) Eneko Arieta
FW	10	(Spain) Ignacio Uribe
FW	11	(Spain) Agustín Gaínza (c)
Manager:
(Czechoslovakia) Ferdinand Daučík

GK	1	(Spain) José María Busto (c)
DF	2	(Spain) Fernando Guillamón
DF	3	(Spain) Marcelino Campanal
DF	4	(Spain) Antonio Valero
MF	5	(Spain) Pepín
MF	6	(Spain) Enrique
FW	7	(Spain) Liz
FW	8	(Spain) Juan Arza
FW	9	(Spain) Quirro
FW	10	(Spain) Manuel Doménech
FW	11	(Spain) Loren
Manager:
(Argentina) Helenio Herrera
