= 1933–34 Campionat de Catalunya =

Campionat de Catalunya
- Season: 1933–34
- Champions: Sabadell
- Relegated: Granollers; Palafrugell
- Matches: 56
- Goals: 204 (3.64 per match)
- Top goalscorer: Miguel Gual (18 goals)
- Biggest home win: Barcelona 7–0 Palafrugell (28 September 1933)
- Biggest away win: Granollers 2–7 Júpiter (1 October 1933)
- Highest scoring: Espanyol 7–3 Palafrugell (8 September 1933)

The 1933–34 Campionat de Catalunya season was the 35th since its establishment and was played between 3 September and 1 November 1933.

== Overview before the season ==
Eight teams joined the Division One league, including two that would play the 1933–34 La Liga, one from the 1933–34 Segunda División and four from the 1933–34 Tercera División.

From La Liga

- Barcelona
- Espanyol

From Segunda División

- Sabadell

From Tercera División

- Badalona
- Girona
- Granollers
- Júpiter

== Division One ==
=== League table ===
Pos	Team	Pld	W	D	L	GF	GA	GD	Pts	Qualification or relegation
1	Sabadell (C)	14	11	1	2	34	19	+15	23	Qualification for Copa del Rey
2	Espanyol	14	9	2	3	40	22	+18	20	Qualification for Copa del Rey
3	Barcelona	14	9	2	3	36	19	+17	20	Qualification for Copa del Rey
4	Júpiter	14	7	1	6	29	23	+6	15	
5	Girona	14	4	3	7	16	22	−6	11	
6	Granollers (R)	14	4	2	8	21	38	−17	10	Qualification for the play-off league
7	Palafrugell (R)	14	2	4	8	13	32	−19	8	Qualification for the play-off league
8	Badalona (O)	14	2	1	11	15	29	−14	5	Qualification for the play-off league

Source: BDFútbol
Rules for classification: 1) points; 2) head-to-head points; 3) head-to-head goal difference; 4) goal difference; 5) number of goals scored
(C) Champions; (O) Play-off winners; (R) Relegated

=== Results ===
Home \ Away	BAD	FCB	ESP	GIR	GRA	JUP	PAL	SAB
Badalona	—	1–3	4–3	2–3	1–2	2–1	0–1	1–2
Barcelona	3–0	—	3–5	0–0	2–1	3–1	7–0	3–1
Espanyol	2–1	3–1	—	2–0	3–0	2–3	7–3	2–2
Girona	3–1	2–2	1–1	—	0–2	1–2	2–0	0–2
Granollers	2–1	1–4	0–3	4–1	—	2–7	3–3	2–5
Júpiter	1–0	2–3	1–4	1–0	4–0	—	3–0	3–4
Palafrugell	1–1	1–0	0–1	1–2	1–1	0–0	—	1–3
Sabadell	2–0	1–2	3–2	2–1	3–1	2–0	2–1	—

Source: BDFútbol
Legend: Blue = home team win; Yellow = draw; Red = away team win.

=== Top goalscorers ===
Goalscorers	Goals	Team
(Spain) Miguel Gual	18	Sabadell
(Spain) Francisco Iriondo	12	Espanyol
(Spain) Serra	11	Júpiter
(Spain) Juan Ramón	10	Barcelona
(Spain) Clarà	8	Girona

== Play-off league ==
Pos	Team	Pld	W	D	L	GF	GA	GD	Pts	Qualification or relegation
1	Badalona (C)	10	6	2	2	28	15	+13	14	Play-off winners
2	Terrassa	10	5	3	2	29	16	+13	13	
3	Granollers	10	6	1	3	28	18	+10	13	
4	Sants	10	5	0	5	19	28	−9	10	
5	Martinenc	10	2	1	7	15	25	−10	5	
6	Palafrugell	10	2	1	7	15	32	−17	5	

Source: BDFútbol
Rules for classification: 1) points; 2) head-to-head points; 3) head-to-head goal difference; 4) goal difference; 5) number of goals scored
(C) Champions

== Division Two ==
=== Group A ===
Pos	Team	Pld	W	D	L	GF	GA	GD	Pts	Qualification or relegation
1	Sants	14	10	2	2	43	15	+28	22	Qualification for the final group
2	Sant Andreu	14	7	3	4	26	21	+5	17	Qualification for the final group
3	Martinenc	14	6	3	5	28	27	+1	15	Qualification for the final group
4	Santboià	14	6	3	5	29	28	+1	15	
5	Poble Nou	14	4	5	5	14	21	−7	13	
6	Reus	14	4	3	7	13	27	−14	11	
7	Horta	14	4	2	8	19	25	−6	10	
8	Gimnàstic Tarragona	14	3	3	8	18	26	−8	9	

Source: BDFútbol
Rules for classification: 1) points; 2) head-to-head points; 3) head-to-head goal difference; 4) goal difference; 5) number of goals scored

=== Group B ===
Pos	Team	Pld	W	D	L	GF	GA	GD	Pts	Qualification or relegation
1	Terrassa	13	11	1	1	32	5	+27	23	Qualification for the final group
2	Iluro	13	7	4	2	30	14	+16	18	Qualification for the final group
3	Manresa	13	7	2	4	22	17	+5	16	Qualification for the final group
4	Sant Cugat	13	5	2	6	27	29	−2	12	
5	Ripollet	9	5	0	4	18	11	+7	10	
6	Tàrrega	13	3	3	7	15	33	−18	9	
7	Mollet	12	2	1	9	12	27	−15	5	
8	Vilafranca	10	1	1	8	6	26	−20	3	

Source: BDFútbol
Rules for classification: 1) points; 2) head-to-head points; 3) head-to-head goal difference; 4) goal difference; 5) number of goals scored

=== Final group ===
Pos	Team	Pld	W	D	L	GF	GA	GD	Pts	Qualification or relegation
1	Sants	10	6	2	2	19	14	+5	14	Qualification for the play-off league
2	Martinenc	10	5	3	2	14	9	+5	13	Qualification for the play-off league
3	Terrassa	10	5	2	3	22	9	+13	12	Qualification for the play-off league
4	Manresa	10	4	1	5	16	17	−1	9	
5	Iluro	10	4	0	6	17	20	−3	8	
6	Sant Andreu	10	1	2	7	11	30	−19	4	

Source: BDFútbol
Rules for classification: 1) points; 2) head-to-head points; 3) head-to-head goal difference; 4) goal difference; 5) number of goals scored
