= Enrique Montero =

Enrique Montero may refer to:

- Enrique Montero Cabrera (1887–?), Chilean journalist and politician
- Enrique Montero Marx (1928–2022), Chilean lawyer and military officer
- Enrique Montero (footballer) (Enrique Montero Rodríguez, born 1954), Spanish footballer
