= Marcelino Campanal =

Spanish footballer (1932–2020)

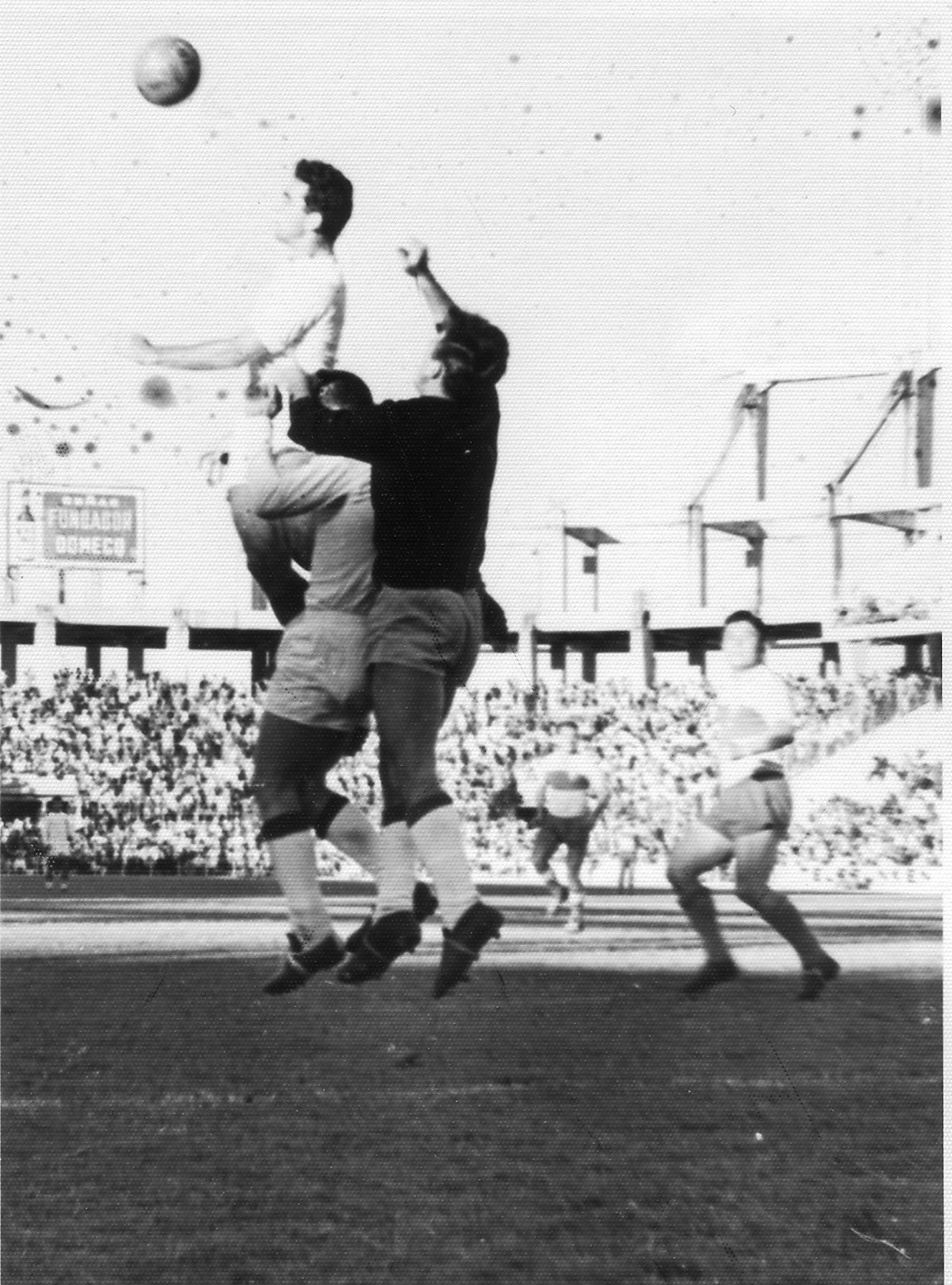
- Campanal in a 1961 match

Personal information
- Full name: Marcelino Vaquero González del Río
- Date of birth: 13 February 1932
- Place of birth: Gijón, Spain
- Date of death: 25 May 2020 (aged 88)
- Place of death: Avilés, Spain
- Position: Defender

Senior career*
Years	Team	Apps	(Gls)
1950–1966	Sevilla		
1966–1967	Deportivo La Coruña		
1967	Iliturgi		
1968–1969	Real Avilés		

International career
1952–1957	Spain	11	(0)
- * Club domestic league appearances and goals

Marcelino Vaquero González del Río (13 February 1932 – 25 May 2020), known as Marcelino Campanal, was a Spanish footballer who played as a defender. He played for Real Avilés CF, Sevilla FC, Deportivo de La Coruña and CD Iliturgi from 1947 to 1969. He also played eleven times for the Spain national team during his career.

== Club career ==
Despite being born in the north of Spain, he began his career in the youth ranks of Sevilla at aged 16. He was loaned out a few times as a teenager, but at 19, he signed with the first team and would soon stand out. He would go on to represent the club for 16 seasons despite significant interest from top clubs throughout Europe including Real Madrid, Inter Milan, and Barcelona. As a Nervionense, he was never able to lift a title, although he was twice runner-up in the league and lost in two Copa del Rey finals, in 1955 and 1962 respectively. He finally left Sevilla in 1966, at the age of 34, to join Deportivo de La Coruña. Then he played for C.D. Iliturgi in Jaén before retiring at the age of 37 whilst at Real Avilés.

== International career ==
Campanal was a regular for the Spain national team during the 1950s, wearing the captain's armband at just 23 years of age. In 1954, he was named Spanish sportsman of the year.

== Legacy ==
Campanal was known as an energetic defender and is considered to be the best defender in the history of Sevilla. On 22 November 2011, he was the third inductee to Sevilla's Hall of Fame, after Juan Arza and José María Busto.

== Personal life ==
Campanal was born in Gijón, Spain. He died on 25 May 2020 at a hospital in Avilés, Spain, aged 88.
