= Raimundo Blanco =

Spanish footballer

Personal information
- Full name: Raimundo Blanco Toranzo
- Date of birth: 1 October 1918
- Place of birth: Seville, Spain
- Date of death: 28 June 1984 (aged 65)
- Place of death: Sevilla, Spain
- Position: Forward

Youth career
- 1935–1939: Sevilla

Senior career*
Years	Team	Apps	(Gls)
1939–1945	Sevilla	68	(44)
- * Club domestic league appearances and goals

Raimundo Blanco Toranzo (born 1 October 1918 – 28 June 1984) was a Spanish footballer who played as a forward. He was best known for his stint with Sevilla in the 1940s.

== Playing career ==
Raimundo spent his entire career with Sevilla from 1935 to 1945, before retiring due to injuries. Manager Pepe Brand incorporated Raimundo into Sevilla's first team in 1935. He was part of a renowned offensive line at Sevilla called the "Stuka", alongside Pepillo, José López, Campanal I, and Rafael Berrocal.

After he retired from playing football, Raimundo became a graphic artist. He died in 1984.
