= José López (footballer, born 1914) =

Spanish footballer

Personal information
- Full name: José López Martínez
- Date of birth: 9 June 1914
- Place of birth: Seville, Spain
- Date of death: 3 December 1989 (aged 75)
- Place of death: Sevilla, Spain
- Position: Forward

Senior career*
Years	Team	Apps	(Gls)
1933–1948	Sevilla	196	(40)
1949–1950	Córdoba	13	(4)
- * Club domestic league appearances and goals

José López Martínez (born 9 June 1914 – 3 December 1989) was a Spanish footballer who played as a forward. He was best known for his stint with Sevilla in the 1940s.

== Playing career ==
López was part of a renowned offensive line at Sevilla called the "Stuka", alongside Pepillo, Raimundo Blanco, Campanal I, and Rafael Berrocal.
