= José María Busto =

Spanish footballer and manager

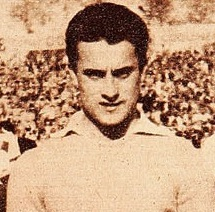
- Busto in 1950

Personal information
- Full name: José María Busto Llano
- Date of birth: 12 November 1923
- Place of birth: Portugalete, Spain
- Date of death: 27 May 2012 (aged 88)
- Place of death: Sevilla, Spain
- Height: 1.71 m (5 ft 7 in)
- Position: Goalkeeper

Youth career
- Patria de Barakaldo
- Athletic Bilbao

Senior career*
| Years | Team | Apps | (Gls) |
| 1940–1941 | Athletic Bilbao | 0 | (0) |
| 1941–1942 | Barakaldo | 12 | (0) |
| 1942–1958 | Sevilla | 338 | (0) |

International career
| 1954 | Spain B | 1 | (0) |

Managerial career
- 1963: Sevilla
- * Club domestic league appearances and goals

José María Busto Llano (12 November 1923 – 27 May 2012), was a Spanish footballer who played as a goalkeeper for Athletic Bilbao and Sevilla in the 1940s and 1950s. He is widely regarded as one of the best goalkeepers in the history of Sevilla.

He later briefly coached Sevilla in 1963.

== Club career ==
=== Early career ===
Born on 12 November 1923 in Portugalete, Biscay, Busto began playing football in school with his friends, and thanks to his good manners, he was soon recruited into the youth ranks of Athletic Bilbao. On 15 September 1940, just two months shy of his 17th birthday, Busto earned his first (and only) appearance for the first team in a pre-season friendly match against Bilbao AC, in which he became off the bench for the second half in an eventual 4–0 win. He spent nearly the entire season with the club's amateur team, so he decided to leave Athletic at the end of season to join another Biscay-based team, Barakaldo, where he quickly stood out from the rest and was signed by Sevilla at the end of the season.

=== Sevilla FC ===
In his first season at the club in 1942–43, Busto helped his side finish as La Liga runners-up, only three points behind his former club Athletic Bilbao. With Sevilla, he formed a great back line with defenders Diego Villalonga and Joaquín Jiménez, one of the best in the club's history, which played a crucial role in the team's success in the late 1940s, winning the Copa del Rey title in 1948, starting in the final against Celta de Vigo at Chamartín (4–1), and winning the league in 1945–46, the only such title in the club's history, where he was once again fundamental as he played every minute of the competition, including the decisive last matchday against FC Barcelona at Les Corts, in which he helped his team hold Barça to a 1–1 draw.

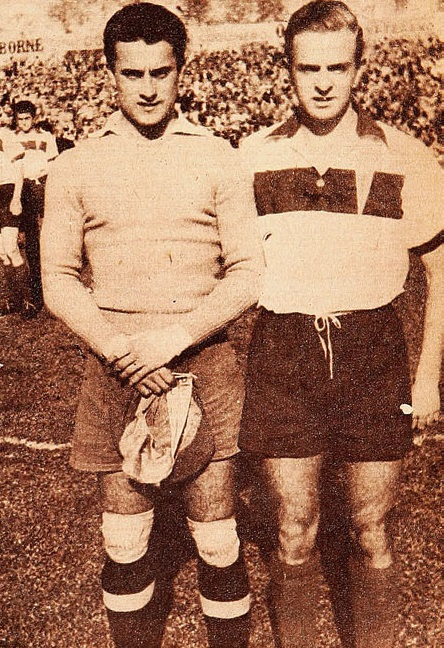
Busto and Prieto in April 1950.

In the 1950s, Busto helped his side to a further two runner-up finishes in the league, 1950–51 and 1956–57, as well as another Cup final in 1955, which ended in a 1–0 loss to his former club Athletic Bilbao, courtesy of a second-half goal from Ignacio Uribe. Mainly thanks to Busto, Sevilla ended the 1950–51 season with the fewest goals conceded in La Liga, with only 46, narrowly ahead of Juan Acuña's Deportivo de La Coruña; however, it was the latter who won the Ricardo Zamora Trophy, having conceded 36 goals in the 26 matches that he played. Their runner-up finish in 1957 allowed Sevilla to play in a European competition for the time in its history, the 1957–58 European Cup, as Spanish champions Real Madrid had already qualified as holders, and these two Spanish sides went on to meet in the quarter-finals, the first time two sides from the same country played against each other in the competition; in the first leg at the Santiago Bernabéu on 23 January 1958, the 34-year-old Busto conceded eight goals in a resounding 8–0 loss, including four from Alfredo Di Stéfano. This humiliation caused the then coach Helenio Herrera to deprive him of playing in the match celebrating Sevilla's Golden Anniversary.

He was known for his ability to block unlikely balls and for his non-pompous style between the posts, as well as his positioning, reflexes, and composure, which, coupled with his remarkable consistency, allowed him to remain as Sevilla's starting goalkeeper for 16 seasons from 1942 until 1958, establishing the club record for the most seasons between the posts. He is considered, along with Guillermo Eizaguirre, the best goalkeeper in Sevilla's history. He is also the only goalkeeper who saved a penalty from Paco Gento in an official match, doing so in the 1956–57 La Liga, when he was already in his mid-30s. In total, Busto played 401 matches for Sevilla, including 338 La Liga matches.

== International career ==
Busto was called up to the Spain national team on several occasions, but he was never able to make his international debut because of the presence of Ignacio Eizaguirre, Antonio Ramallets, and Carmelo Cedrún. However, he earned one cap for the Spanish B team in March 1954, in which he helped his side to keep a clean-sheet in a 2–0 win over France B in the opening match of the 1953–58 Mediterranean Cup. Spain eventually won the tournament.

== Managerial career ==
After his career as a player ended, Busto remained closely linked to Sevilla, now as a director, and he even briefly served as the team's coach in 1963, overseeing only three La Liga matches during the transition between Antonio Barrios and Otto Bumbel.

== Death ==
Busto died in Seville on 27 May 2012, at the age of 88. At the time of his death, he was the last living member of the Sevilla team who had won the league in 1946.

== Honours ==
=== Club ===
Sevilla FC

- La Liga
  - Champion: 1945–46
- Copa del Rey:
  - Winner: 1948
  - Runner-up: 1955

=== International ===
Spain B

- Mediterranean Cup:
  - Champions: 1953–58
