= Tolo Plaza =

Spanish footballer (1949–2000)

Personal information
- Full name: Bartolomé Plaza Muela
- Date of birth: 21 February 1949
- Place of birth: La Carolina, Spain
- Date of death: 11 June 2000 (aged 51)
- Place of death: Valencia, Spain
- Height: 1.68 m (5 ft 6 in)
- Position: Forward

Senior career*
Years	Team	Apps	(Gls)
1969–1970	Castellón	9	(0)
1970–1971	Recreativo Huelva	2	(1)
1971–1972	Castellón	5	(0)
1972–1974	Linares	31+	(8+)
1974–1978	Sevilla	44	(11)
1977–1978	Sevilla Atlético	17	(3)
1978	→ Recreativo Huelva (loan)	4	(0)
1978–1979	Algeciras	25	(2)
1979–1982	Linares	83	(15)
Total		220+	(40+)

Managerial career
- 1984–1985: Sevilla Atlético
- 1985–1987: Utrera
- 1988: Atlético Marbella
- 1988–1989: Jaén
- 1989–1990: Linares
- 1991–1992: Jaén
- 1992–1993: Córdoba
- 1993–1996: Jaén
- 1997: Málaga
- 1998–2000: Elche
- * Club domestic league appearances and goals

Bartolomé Plaza Muela (21 February 1949 – 11 June 2000) was a Spanish football player and manager.

== Playing career ==
Born in La Carolina in the Province of Jaén, Plaza played as a forward for Sevilla in La Liga (21 games, 6 goals) and for five teams including the former in the Segunda División (148 games, 19 goals). On 4 January 1976, he came on as a substitute for Rafael Martínez after 35 minutes, and eight minutes later scored the opening goal for Sevilla in a 2–0 home win over Real Betis in the Seville derby. In April 1978, he was loaned to a Recreativo de Huelva side chasing promotion to the top flight with five games remaining.

Plaza played 32 games and scored 11 goals in 1979–80 as Linares won their Segunda División B group. His tally included a goal in the final match on 1 June, a 4–2 win at Calvo Sotelo.

== Managerial career ==
Plaza managed Real Jaén in a record 229 games in the 1990s, in Segunda División B. He also led Córdoba in 1992–93. In 1996–97, he left halfway through a promotion-winning season to join Málaga, but was fired after 13 games of the following campaign with the team in 7th place, with three points less than leaders Granada; the season ended with promotion under his successor Ismael Díaz.

Elche appointed Plaza in 1998 and he led the team to promotion to the Segunda División via the playoffs. He was sacked in January 2000 with the team in the relegation zone.

== Personal life ==
Plaza had a son of the same name, who played in lower-league football.

Plaza died on 11 June 2000 at hospital in Valencia, aged 51. He had been diagnosed with lymphatic cancer for the third time. Real Jaén, Málaga and Elche held a pre-season tournament in his memory.
