= Miguel Gual Agustina =

Spanish footballer and manager (1909–1968)

Miguel Gual
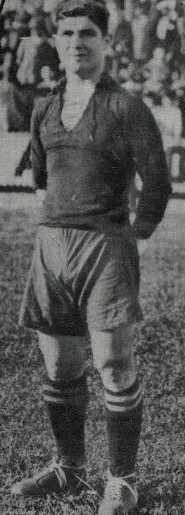
- Gual in 1929

Personal information
- Full name: Miguel Gual Agustina
- Birth name: Miquel Gual i Agustina
- Date of birth: 11 May 1911
- Place of birth: Barcelona, Spain
- Date of death: 9 March 1989 (aged 77)
- Place of death: Barcelona, Spain
- Position: Forward

Youth career
- Sants

Senior career*
Years	Team	Apps	(Gls)
1928–1929	Júpiter		
1929–1931	Sevilla		
1931	Racing de Córdoba		
1931–1933	Barcelona	60	(30)
1933–1936	Sabadell FC		
1936–1937	Barcelona		
1938–1939	Real Club España		
1940–1943	Sabadell FC		
1943–1946	Espanya Industrial		

International career
1932–1937	Catalonia	7	(3)

Managerial career
- 1947–1956: Espanya Industrial
- 1956–1957: CD Condal
- 1957–1958: Mallorca
- 1958–1959: Córdoba
- 1959–1960: CE Europa
- 1960–1962: Osasuna
- 1962–1963: Racing de Santander
- 1963–1965: Osasuna
- 1968–1970: Atlètic Catalunya
- * Club domestic league appearances and goals

Miguel Gual Agustina (11 May 1911 – 9 March 1989) was a Spanish footballer who played as a forward for Sevilla, Barcelona, and Sabadell in the 1930s and 1940s.

He is considered one of the best players in Sabadell's history, playing a crucial role in helping them win their first-ever trophy, the 1933–34 Campionat de Catalunya, reach their first (and only) Copa del Rey final in 1935, and achieve their first-ever promotion to La Liga in 1943, scoring a total of 73 goals in 79 matches, which makes him the club's all-time top scorer.

As a manager, he oversaw Espanya Industrial for 13 years, from 1943 until 1956, as well as Osasuna and Racing de Santander in the early 1960s.

== Club career ==
Born in the Catalonian town of Barcelona on 11 May 1911, Gual began his career in the youth ranks of Sants, from which he joined Júpiter in 1928, aged 17, where he caught the attention of Sevilla, who gave him his first professional contract after signing him for 8,000 pesetas. Together with Guillermo Eizaguirre, Manuel Roldán, and Pepe Brand, he was a member of the Sevilla team coached by Lippo Hertzka that won the first-ever edition of the Segunda División in 1929. Two years later, in 1931, he signed for Racing de Córdoba, with whom he played a match against his former team Sevilla in October of that year; the local press thus described him as a "chameleon" player, stating it was the result of professionalism.

Shortly after, Gual signed for Barcelona, playing only one official match in his first season there, a La Liga fixture against Real Sociedad in January 1932, helping his side to a 2–0 victory. In total, he scored 2 goals in 4 La Liga matches for Barcelona. After being released by Barça in late 1932, he signed for fellow Catalan club Sabadell in 1933, where he showed a great scoring instinct. In his first full season at the club, he played a crucial role in helping them win their first-ever trophy, the 1933–34 Campionat de Catalunya, finishing the tournament as its top scorer with 18 goals. The following year, he helped Sabadell reach the club's first (and only) Copa del Rey final at the Chamartín on 30 June, which ended in a 3–0 loss to his former club Sevilla. Gual had to play almost the entire match with physical problems.

When the Spanish Civil War broke out in 1936, Gual returned to Barcelona, with whom he won the inaugural edition of the Mediterranean League in 1937, which was created to replace the competitions that had been abruptly stopped. In the summer of 1937, he was a member of the Barça team that toured Mexico, and like so many others, he did not took the risk of returning to Barcelona because of the ongoing War, choosing instead to remain in Mexico, where he played for Real Club España in the 1938–39 season.

Once the conflict ended, Gual returned to Sabadell, helping them achieve their first-ever promotion to La Liga in 1943, scoring a goal in the crucial victory against Sporting Gijón at the Creu Alta. In total, he scored a total of 73 goals in 79 matches, making him the club's all-time top scorer. Furthermore, he also holds the club records for most goals in a single match with five against Badalona (1934–35), and longest goalscoring streak with seven (1940–41). After leaving Sabadell in 1943, he went to Espanya Industrial, where he retired in 1946, aged 35.

== International career ==
Like so many other Barça and Sabadell players, Gual was eligible to play for the Catalan national team, scoring 1 goal in 3 matches. He made his debut on 26 June 1932, in a friendly match against Torino FC, a team that fielded 8 internationals from the Italian national team, helping his side to a 3–2 victory. The following year, on 24 June 1933, in a match against his future club Sabadell, he scored in a 2–4 loss. The following year, in June 1934, he started for Catalonia in a friendly against the Brazilian national team, scoring once in a 2–2 draw. A few weeks later, on 29 July, he started for Sabadell against the Catalan national team in a tribute match to benefit Sabadell player Santiago Sitges, who had been hospitalized after a motorcycle accident a few days earlier; it ended in a 1–1 draw.

== Managerial career ==
After retiring, Gual remained linked to Espanya Industrial, now as a coach, which he oversaw for 13 years, from 1943 until 1956, leading it through promotion after promotion from the regional level to the top-flight in 1956, when the club was renamed CD Condal. He stood out as a discoverer of young players, to whom he always told "to press the opponent with three players and look for the least technical player".

After brieft stints at Córdoba (1958–59) and CE Europa (1959–60), he took the helm of both Osasuna (1961–62) and Racing de Santander (1962–63), and again of Osasuna (1963–65). He later coached Atlètic Catalunya from 1968 until 1970.

== Death ==
He died on 9 March 1989.

== Honours ==
Sevilla

- Segunda División:
  - Champions (1): 1929

FC Barcelona

- Copa Macià:
  - Champions (1): 1932

Sabadell

- Catalan championship:
  - Champions (1): 1933–34
  - Runners-up (1): 1934–35
- Copa del Rey:
  - Runners-up: 1935
- Segunda División
  - Champions (1): 1942–43
