= Juventud Unión Montañesa =

Spanish football club

- Full name: Juventud Unión Montañesa
- Founded: 1918
- Dissolved: 1949
- Ground: Campo de Miramar
- Capacity: 4,000
Home colours

Juventud Unión Montañesa was a Spanish football club based in Santander.

== History ==
The club was founded in 1918 as Unión Montañesa, a juvenile club, and by 1919 was playing in the second division of the Federación Norte. After the Spanish Civil War had disrupted regular football, the club added Juventud to its name, and in 1938–39 and 1939–40 the club was twice runner-up in the local first division, which entitled the club to take part in the Copa del Rey in 1939 and 1940, losing in the first round both times.

By the 1948–49 season, the club was struggling in the third division of the new Astur-Montañesa region, and disbanded at the season's close.
