= 1946–47 Segunda División =

16th season of the second-tier football league in Spain

Segunda División
- Season: 1946–47
- Champions: Alcoyano
- Promoted: Alcoyano; Gimnástico; Real Sociedad
- Relegated: Real Santander; Zaragoza; Real Betis
- Matches: 182
- Goals: 679 (3.73 per match)
- Top goalscorer: Francisco Peralta (24 goals)
- Best goalkeeper: Andrés Company (1.4 goals/match)
- Biggest home win: Levante 8–0 Racing Ferrol (9 March 1947)
- Biggest away win: Baracaldo 0–7 Real Sociedad (27 October 1946)
- Highest scoring: Gimnástico 8–2 Baracaldo (5 January 1947)

The 1946–47 Segunda División season was the 16th since its establishment and was played between 22 September 1946 and 13 April 1947.

== Overview before the season ==
14 teams joined the league, including two relegated from the 1945–46 La Liga and three promoted from the 1945–46 Tercera División.

Relegated from La Liga

- Alcoyano
- Hércules

Promoted from Tercera División

- Málaga
- Levante
- Baracaldo

== Teams ==
Location of teams in Segunda División 1946-47

Club	City	Stadium
CD Alcoyano	Alcoy	El Collao
Club Baracaldo	Baracaldo	Lasesarre
Real Betis Balompié	Seville	Heliópolis
RCD Córdoba	Córdoba	El Arcángel
Club Ferrol	Ferrol	Inferniño
Gimnástico de Tarragona	Tarragona	Avenida de Cataluña
Granada CF	Granada	Los Cármenes
Hércules CF	Alicante	La Viña
Levante UD	Valencia	Vallejo
CD Málaga	Málaga	La Rosaleda
RCD Mallorca	Palma de Mallorca	Es Fortí
Real Sociedad	San Sebastián	Atocha
Real Santander SD	Santander	El Sardinero
Zaragoza FC	Zaragoza	Torrero

== League table ==
Pos	Team	Pld	W	D	L	GF	GA	GD	Pts	Promotion, qualification or relegation
1	Alcoyano (C, P)	26	16	6	4	65	36	+29	38	Promotion to La Liga
2	Gimnástico (P)	26	16	3	7	67	42	+25	35	Promotion to La Liga
3	Real Sociedad (O, P)	26	13	6	7	55	37	+18	32	Qualification for the promotion playoffs
4	Hércules	26	14	2	10	48	44	+4	30	
5	Mallorca	26	13	0	13	47	48	−1	26 (Note: Mallorca finished ahead of Levante on head-to-head goal difference: Mallorca–Levante 1–3, Levante–Mallorca 0–3)	
6	Levante	26	12	2	12	62	54	+8	26	
7	Granada	26	10	5	11	36	51	−15	25	
8	Real Córdoba	26	9	6	11	38	41	−3	24	
9	Málaga	26	8	7	11	38	44	−6	23	
10	Racing Ferrol	26	9	4	13	48	62	−14	22	
11	Baracaldo	26	10	1	15	58	59	−1	21 (Note: Baracaldo finished ahead of Real Santander and Zaragoza on head-to-head points: Baracaldo 6 pts, Real Santander 4 pts, Zaragoza 2 pts)	
12	Real Santander (R)	26	7	7	12	38	54	−16	21	Qualification for the relegation playoffs
13	Zaragoza (R)	26	9	3	14	42	47	−5	21	Relegation to Tercera División
14	Real Betis (R)	26	8	4	14	37	60	−23	20	Relegation to Tercera División

Source: BDFútbol
Rules for classification: 1) points; 2) head-to-head points; 3) head-to-head goal difference; 4) goal difference; 5) number of goals scored
(C) Champions; (O) Play-off winners; (P) Promoted; (R) Relegated

== Results ==
Home \ Away	ALC	BAR	GIM	GRA	HER	LEV	CDM	MAL	COR	RFE	RAC	BET	RSO	ZAR
Alcoyano	—	3–0	3–1	1–1	1–3	5–2	1–2	3–1	2–0	5–2	4–1	6–1	0–0	3–0
Baracaldo	0–0	—	0–1	6–2	6–2	5–1	4–2	6–1	5–2	2–3	3–0	6–1	0–7	4–0
Gimnástico	4–2	8–2	—	3–0	5–2	4–3	4–0	2–0	3–0	4–1	4–2	4–3	0–0	4–1
Granada	2–2	3–1	2–1	—	2–1	1–2	4–2	2–0	0–1	3–0	4–0	3–0	2–1	2–1
Hércules	0–1	3–2	2–1	4–0	—	2–2	1–0	2–0	2–0	3–2	1–0	3–2	4–1	3–1
Levante	4–3	3–1	4–1	3–0	0–2	—	4–2	0–3	2–3	8–0	6–0	5–1	4–0	1–0
Málaga	2–2	1–0	5–3	0–0	2–1	1–1	—	1–3	0–0	5–0	3–0	1–0	4–2	0–0
Mallorca	2–3	2–0	3–0	3–0	3–0	1–3	2–0	—	2–0	5–1	3–2	4–2	2–0	2–1
Real Córdoba	2–3	3–0	1–1	5–0	2–0	2–0	1–1	2–0	—	1–1	2–2	3–1	3–2	0–1
Racing Ferrol	1–2	3–0	3–4	3–0	2–2	3–1	4–1	2–1	2–1	—	3–1	1–1	3–4	4–0
Real Santander	2–2	0–2	0–1	2–2	2–4	3–0	2–1	3–2	2–0	1–1	—	4–1	2–2	3–0
Real Betis	0–2	3–2	0–0	2–0	2–0	2–0	1–0	6–0	1–1	3–1	2–2	—	0–3	1–0
Real Sociedad	1–2	2–0	3–2	1–1	2–1	6–2	2–0	2–1	4–1	2–1	1–1	3–0	—	3–0
Zaragoza	2–4	3–1	0–2	6–0	3–0	3–1	2–2	5–1	4–2	2–1	0–1	6–1	1–1	—

Source: BDFútbol
Legend: Blue = home team win; Yellow = draw; Red = away team win.

== Top goalscorers ==
Goalscorers	Goals	Team
(Spain) Francisco Peralta	24	Gimnástico
(Spain) Vicente Martínez	20	Levante
(Spain) José Mijares	18	Mallorca
(Spain) Anselmo Campos	15	Real Sociedad
(Spain) Pascual Escrivá	15	Levante

== Top goalkeepers ==
Goalkeeper	Goals	Matches	Average	Team
(Spain) Andrés Company	28	20	1.4	Alcoyano
(Spain) Román Galarraga	37	26	1.42	Real Sociedad
(Spain) Luis Martín	41	26	1.58	Real Córdoba
(Spain) Cosme	44	26	1.69	Hércules
(Spain) Joaquín Comas	44	26	1.69	Málaga

== Promotion playoffs ==
8 June 1947	Real Sociedad	2–0	Murcia	Madrid
	Castivia 18'; Campos 75'	Report		Stadium: Metropolitano; Referee: Escartín

== Relegation playoffs ==
13 July 1947	Valladolid	3–1	Real Santander	Oviedo
	Vaquero 7', 15', 36'	Report	Saras 37'	Stadium: Buenavista; Referee: Iturralde Gorostiaga
