= Adolfo Bracero =

Spanish pharmacist and footballer

Personal information
- Full name: Adolfo Bracero García
- Date of birth: 22 October 1909
- Place of birth: Huelva, Spain
- Date of death: 30 August 1978 (aged 68)
- Position: Forward

Senior career*
Years	Team	Apps	(Gls)
1926–1929	Libertad FC		
1929–1930	Titán FC Huelva		
1930–1931	Recreativo de Huelva		
1931–1936	Sevilla FC		
1939–1940	Atlético Aviación		
1940–1941	Real Madrid		
1941–1942	UD Salamanca		
1942–1945	Recreativo de Huelva		

Managerial career
- 1945–1947: Recreativo de Huelva
- 1947–1948: CD Iliturgi
- 1952–1953: Real Jaén
- 1953–1954: Granada CF
- 1955–1956: CD San Fernando
- 1956–1958: CD Badajoz
- 1958–1959: Recreativo de Huelva
- 1959–1960: CD Badajoz
- 1961–1962: UD Salamanca
- 1964–1965: Recreativo de Huelva
- * Club domestic league appearances and goals

Adolfo Bracero García (22 October 1909 – 30 August 1978) was a Spanish footballer who played as a forward for Atlético Madrid, Real Madrid, and Sevilla FC. He was the first footballer to play for both Sevilla and Madrid.

He later became a managerial, taking charge of Real Jaén for two years, during which he took them from the Tercera División to La Liga along with a Federation Cup.

== Playing career ==
Born in Huelva on 22 October 1909, Bracero began his footballing career in his hometown club Libertad FC in 1926, aged 17, where he quickly established himself as a decisive player, scoring his side's only goal in a 1–1 draw with rivals Gimnástico on 14 August of that year. Bracero went on to play for Titán FC Huelva and Recreativo de Huelva, where he played until as late as September 1931. In that same year, the 22-year-old Bracero joined their rivals Sevilla, with whom he played for five years until the outbreak of the Spanish Civil War in 1936. On 3 February 1935, he started in the first-ever derby against Real Betis in the Top Division, which ended in a 3–0 loss. A few months later, he started in the 1935 Spanish Cup final against Sabadell, scoring his side's third goal to seal a 3–0 victory.

Once the conflict was over, Bracero joined Club Aviación, the future Atlético Madrid, where he was a member of Athletic's historic 1939–40 season, in which the club won the 1939 Campeonato Mancomunado Centro and the 1939–40 La Liga under coach Ricardo Zamora; however, he did not play a major role in these triumphs since he only started two league matches during the season. He went on to join Real Madrid, where he again had few chances, playing only three matches for the whites. In total, he scored five goals in 18 league matches for Sevilla, Atlético, and Madrid. He thus became the first footballer to play for both Sevilla and Madrid.

Bracero played his last football for UD Salamanca and Recreativo de Huelva, where he retired in 1945, aged 36.

== Managerial career ==
After his career as a player ended, Bracero remained linked to Recreativo de Huelva, now as a coach, which he oversaw between 1945 and 1947. He then had a brief stint at the helm of Úbeda and CD Iliturgi in 1947–48. Following a three-year hiatus, he took charge of third division side Real Jaén in 1951, and in his first season at the club, Bracero not only guided them to promotion to the second division, but also to a triumph at the 1951–52 Copa Federación de España, in which they defeated Orensana 3–1 in the final at the Estadio Metropolitano de Madrid. The promotion match took place against UD Almería on 6 April 1952, which they won by the score of 3–0. In the following season, he guided the club to another promotion, this time to the first division, the club's first and only such season in its history. In total, he coached Jaén in 75 games, which puts him in 9th in the club's history.

He went on to manage Granada CF (1953–54), CD San Fernando (1955–56), CD Badajoz (1956–58), and again Recreativo de Huelva in the 1958–59 season, during which the club won 25 matches, which made Bracero in the most successful Huelva coach in a single campaign, ahead of Salmerén and the Uruguayan Victor Esparrago with 23 each. In the mid-1950s, he played a few matches as a forward for San Fernando and Badajoz, at the ages of 46 and 48. He then coached UD Salamanca (1961–62) and, for the third and last time, Recreativo de Huelva in 1964–65.

== Honours ==
=== As a player ===
Sevilla

- Copa del Rey:
  - Champions (1): 1935

Atlético Aviación

- La Liga:
  - Champions (1): 1939–40

=== As a coach ===
Real Jaén

- Segunda División:
  - Champions (1): 1952–53

== See also ==
- List of Real Madrid CF players
