= Rafael Berrocal =

Spanish footballer

Personal information
- Full name: Rafael Berrocal Buzac
- Date of birth: 24 August 1914
- Place of birth: Seville, Spain
- Date of death: 8 June 1969 (aged 54)
- Place of death: Seville, Spain
- Position: Forward

Senior career*
Years	Team	Apps	(Gls)
- Castilla Balompié
	Betis	0	(0)
1934–1943	Sevilla	86	(29)
1943–1946	Xerez	57	(13)
1946–1947	Úbeda		
1947–1949	Tomelloso		
- * Club domestic league appearances and goals

Rafael Berrocal Buzac (born 24 August 1914 – 8 June 1969) was a Spanish footballer who played as a forward. He was best known for his stint with Sevilla in the 1940s.

== Playing career ==
Berrocal was part of a renowned offensive line at Sevilla called the "Stuka", alongside Pepillo, Raimundo Blanco, Campanal I, and José López.
