= 1935 Copa del Presidente de la República final =

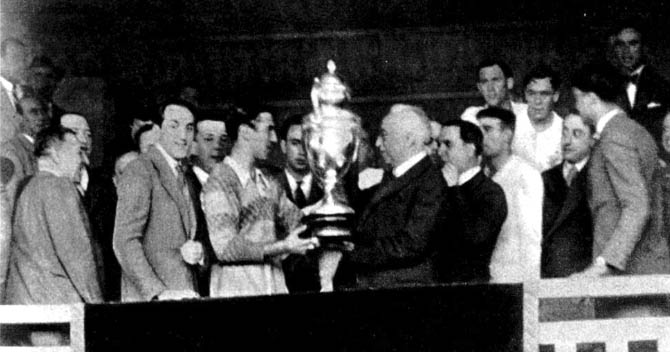
- Captain Guillermo Eizaguirre receiving the trophy
- Event: 1935 Copa del Rey
Sevilla	Sabadell
3	0
- Date: 30 June 1935
- Venue: Estadio Chamartín, Madrid
- Referee: Pedro Escartín
- Attendance: 15,000

The 1935 Copa del Presidente de la República final was the 35th final of the Copa del Rey, the Spanish football cup competition. Sevilla FC beat CE Sabadell FC 3–0.

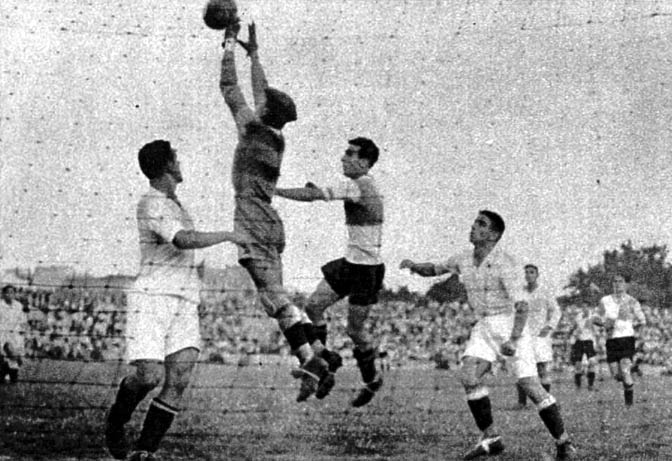
A moment of the match

== Match details ==
30 June 1935
16:45 CET

Sevilla	3–0	Sabadell
Campanal 36', 78'; Bracero 89'	Report

Estadio Chamartín, Madrid
Attendance: 15,000
Referee: Pedro Escartín

Sevilla

Sabadell

GK	1	(Spain) Guillermo Eizaguirre (c)
DF	2	(Spain) Euskalduna
DF	3	(Spain) Deva
MF	4	(Spain) Manuel Alcázar
MF	5	(Spain) Antonio Segura
MF	6	(Spain) Fede
FW	7	(Spain) Pepe López
FW	8	(Spain) Miguel Torrontegui
FW	9	(Spain) Campanal I
FW	10	(Spain) Tache
FW	11	(Spain) Adolfo Bracero
Manager:
(Spain) Ramón Encinas

GK	1	(Spain) Juan Massip
DF	2	(Spain) José Morral
DF	3	(Spain) Salvador Blanch
MF	4	(Spain) José Argemí
MF	5	(Spain) Valentín Font
MF	6	(Spain) Vicente Gracia
FW	7	(Spain) Antonio Sangüesa
FW	8	(Spain) Ángel Antonio Calvet (c)
FW	9	(Spain) Miguel Gual
FW	10	(Spain) José Barceló
FW	11	(Spain) Manuel Parera
Manager:
(Spain) Juan Tena Guimerá
