= Antonio Valero (footballer, born 1931) =

Spanish footballer (1931–2018)

Personal information
- Full name: Antonio Valero Yubero
- Date of birth: 21 March 1931
- Place of birth: Madrid, Spain
- Date of death: 3 October 2018 (aged 87)
- Height: 1.72 m (5 ft 8 in)
- Position: Defender

Senior career*
| Years | Team | Apps | (Gls) |
| 1951–1954 | RCD Córdoba | 58 | (0) |
| 1954–1963 | Sevilla | 194 | (3) |
| Total | | 252 | (3) |

International career
| 1957 | Spain | 1 | (0) |
- * Club domestic league appearances and goals

Antonio Valero Yubero (21 March 1931 – 3 October 2018) was a Spanish footballer who played as a defender.

== Career ==
Born in Madrid, Valero played club football for RCD Córdoba and Sevilla.

He made one international appearance for Spain in 1957.

== Later life and death ==
After retiring as a player due to injury, he worked as coach for the Sevilla youth teams. He died on 3 October 2018, at the age of 87.
