= Pepillo (footballer, born 1916) =

Spanish footballer

Personal information
- Full name: José Díaz Payán
- Date of birth: 17 December 1916
- Place of birth: Seville, Spain
- Date of death: 9 August 1990 (aged 73)
- Place of death: Sevilla, Spain
- Position: Forward

Senior career*
Years	Team	Apps	(Gls)
1939–1945	Sevilla	94	(47)
1950–1951	Gimnástica de Torrelavega	6	(1)
- * Club domestic league appearances and goals

José Díaz Payán (17 December 1916 – 9 August 1990), better known Pepillo, was a Spanish footballer who played as a forward. He was best known for his stint with Sevilla in the 1940s.

== Playing career ==
Pepillo spent most of his playing career with his local Sevilla. He was part of a renowned offensive line at Sevilla called the "Stuka", alongside Raimundo Blanco, José López, Campanal I, and Rafael Berrocal.
