= 1933–34 Segunda División =

6th season of the second-tier football league in Spain

Segunda División
- Season: 1933–34
- Champions: Sevilla FC
- Promoted: Sevilla FC; Athletic Club Madrid
- Matches: 90
- Goals: 378 (4.2 per match)
- Top goalscorer: Campanal I (28 goals)
- Best goalkeeper: Salvador Pacheco (1.58 goals/match)

The 1933–34 Segunda División season saw 10 teams participate in the second flight Spanish league. Sevilla and Atlético were promoted to Primera División. There were no relegations to Tercera División because the league would include more teams the next season.

== Teams ==
Location of teams in Segunda División 1933-34

Club	City	Stadium
Deportivo Alavés	Vitoria	Mendizorroza
Athletic Club Madrid	Madrid	Metropolitano
Celta de Vigo	Vigo	Balaídos
Deportivo de La Coruña	La Coruña	Riazor
Murcia FC	Murcia	La Condomina
CA Osasuna	Pamplona	San Juan
CS Sabadell FC	Sabadell	Creu Alta
Sevilla FC	Seville	Nervión
Sporting de Gijón	Gijón	El Molinón
Unión Club Irún	Irun	Stadium Gal

== Final table ==
Pos	Team	Pld	W	D	L	GF	GA	GD	Pts	Promotion
1	Sevilla FC	18	11	5	2	56	27	+29	27	Promoted to Primera División
2	Athletic Club Madrid	18	11	2	5	45	28	+17	24	Promoted to Primera División
3	Murcia FC	18	10	1	7	41	31	+10	21	
4	Celta de Vigo	18	9	2	7	44	28	+16	20	
5	CA Osasuna	18	9	0	9	47	39	+8	18	
6	Sporting de Gijón	18	8	2	8	30	38	−8	18	
7	Deportivo de La Coruña	18	7	3	8	35	38	−3	17	
8	Unión Club Irún	18	7	2	9	31	43	−12	16	
9	CS Sabadell	18	5	4	9	31	45	−14	14	
10	Deportivo Alavés (Note: Alavés renounce to Segunda División after the season ended.)	18	1	3	14	18	61	−43	5	

Source: BDFútbol

== Results ==
Home \ Away	ALA	ATL	CEL	DEP	MUR	OSA	SAB	SEV	SPO	UNI
Deportivo Alavés		2–5	2–1	2–2	2–3	0–2	2–2		3–4	2–4
Athletic Club Madrid	5–0		4–0	3–1	2–2	3–1	3–1	0–2	5–1	3–1
Celta de Vigo	8–0	4–0		3–2	3–1	4–1	6–0	4–0	1–1	3–0
Deportivo de La Coruña	2–0	1–2	4–1		2–1	4–0	2–0	3–3	4–1	4–0
Murcia FC	6–0	2–3	3–1	4–1		1–0	6–0	2–1	3–0	3–1
CA Osasuna	10–2	2–1	3–1	4–1	1–0		6–0	1–3	6–0	3–0
CS Sabadell FC	1–0	1–2	1–1	1–1	3–0	3–2		2–2	5–2	5–1
Sevilla FC	4–0	3–3	3–1	9–0	6–2	5–1	5–1		2–1	3–1
Sporting de Gijón	1–0	1–0	2–0	4–0	3–0	3–2	4–3	0–0		1–2
Unión Club Irún	1–1	3–1	1–2	2–1	1–2	3–1	3–2	5–5	2–1	

Source: BDFútbol
Legend: Blue = home team win; Yellow = draw; Red = away team win.
