= 1940 Copa del Generalísimo =

38th Copa del Rey

Tournament details
- Country: Spain
- Teams: 31

Final positions
- Champions: RCD Español (2nd title)
- Runners-up: Real Madrid

Tournament statistics
- Matches played: 61

The 1940 Copa del Generalísimo was the 38th staging of the Copa del Rey, the Spanish football cup competition.

The competition started on 12 May 1940 and concluded on 30 June 1940 with the final, held at the Campo de Fútbol de Vallecas in Madrid.

== First round ==
Team 1	Agg.	Team 2	1st leg	2nd leg
AD Ferroviaria	3–6	Deportivo La Coruña	1–1	2–5
Sportiva Ovetense	3–9	Club Celta	2–2	1–7
Juventud Unión Montañesa	1–10	Sporting Gijón	0–6	1–4
SD Erandio Club	1–3	Racing Santander	1–1	0–2
Real Sociedad	3–0	Racing Langreano	3–0	0–0
CD Alavés	0–10	Athletic Bilbao	0–6	0–4
Baracaldo FC	0–7	Real Zaragoza	0–4	0–3
Gerona FC	4–4	CA Osasuna	1–2	3–2
Athletic FC	2–9	FC Barcelona	2–2	0–7
Valencia CF	11–3	CD San Andrés	8–2	3–1
CD Español	10–2	Levante Gimnástico	6–2	4–0
CD Malacitano	2–3	Hércules CF	2–1	0–2
Real Murcia	0–6	Real Madrid	0–4	0–2
Ceuta Sport	1–5	Real Betis	0–1	1–4
Sevilla FC	6–2	CD Tenerife	6–1	0–1

Source: RSSSF

- Tiebreaker

Team 1	Score	Team 2
CA Osasuna	2–0	Gerona FC

- Bye: Athletic Aviación

== Round of 16 ==
Team 1	Agg.	Team 2	1st leg	2nd leg
FC Barcelona	5–0	La Coruña	4–0	1–0
Athletic Aviación	2–2	Real Zaragoza	0–0	2–2
CA Osasuna	2–7	Real Madrid	1–4	1–3
Hércules CF	5–2	Ath. Bilbao	5–2	0–0
Racing Santander	4–1	Sporting Gijón	3–0	1–1
Celta Vigo	3–8	RCD Español	1–3	2–5
Valencia CF	7–5	Real Sociedad	3–1	4–4
Sevilla FC	5–3	Real Betis	3–0	2–3

Source: RSSSF

- Tiebreaker

Team 1	Score	Team 2
Real Zaragoza	4–2	Athletic Aviación

== Quarter-finals ==
Team 1	Agg.	Team 2	1st leg	2nd leg
FC Barcelona	1–3	RCD Español	0–2	1–1
Real Madrid	5–1	Racing Santander	3–1	2–0
Hércules CF	4–5	Valencia	2–1	2–4
Sevilla FC	3–4	Real Zaragoza	1–0	2–4

Source: RSSSF

== Semi-finals ==
Team 1	Agg.	Team 2	1st leg	2nd leg
RCD Español	5–2	Valencia CF	3–1	2–1
Real Madrid	2–1	Real Zaragoza	1–0	1–1

Source: RSSSF

== Final ==
Team 1	Score	Team 2
RCD Español	3–2	Real Madrid

Copa del Rey 1940 winners
RCD Español
2nd title
