= Enrique Montero (footballer) =

Spanish footballer (born 1954)

Personal information
- Full name: Enrique Montero Rodríguez
- Date of birth: 28 December 1954 (age 71)
- Place of birth: El Puerto de Santa María, Spain
- Height: 1.79 m (5 ft 10 in)
- Position: Midfielder

Youth career
- San Marcos
- Sevilla

Senior career*
| Years | Team | Apps | (Gls) |
| 1973–1986 | Sevilla | 247 | (40) |
| 1974–1976 | → San Fernando (loan) | | |
| 1986–1990 | Cádiz | 104 | (3) |
| 1990–1992 | Portuense | 13 | (2) |
| Total | | 364 | (44) |

International career
| 1980 | Spain U23 | 2 | (0) |
| 1980 | Spain amateur | 2 | (1) |
| 1980–1981 | Spain B | 4 | (0) |
| 1980–1981 | Spain | 3 | (0) |
- * Club domestic league appearances and goals

Enrique Montero Rodríguez (born 28 December 1954 in El Puerto de Santa María, Andalusia) is a Spanish retired footballer who played as a midfielder. Across the 1970s and 1980s he played 11 seasons for Sevilla, who inducted them into their hall of fame in 2017.
