= Pepe Brand =

Spanish footballer and manager

Personal information
- Full name: José González Brand
- Date of birth: 13 February 1900
- Place of birth: Seville, Spain
- Date of death: 1 July 1971 (aged 71)
- Place of death: Seville, Spain
- Position: Forward

Senior career*
Years	Team	Apps	(Gls)
1917–1933	Sevilla		
1922–1928	Andalusia		

Managerial career
- 1917–1921: Sevilla
- 1939–1941: Sevilla
- 1942: Sevilla
- 1953–1954: Jaén
- 1956–1957: Castellón
- * Club domestic league appearances and goals

José González Brand, known as Pepe Brand (13 February 1900 – 1 July 1971) was a Spanish professional football player and manager associated with Sevilla FC, Real Jaén and CD Castellón.

== Club career ==
A historical member of Sevilla in the 20s, he was one of the first footballers to play for Sevilla for his entire career, and thus be part of the so-called one-club men group.

== International career ==
Being a Sevilla FC player, he was eligible to play for the Andalusian national team, being a member of the team that participated in the 1923-24 Prince of Asturias Cup, an inter-regional competition organized by the RFEF. Brand scored the opening goal in the quarter-finals against Valencia in an eventual 3–2 win, thus reaching the semi-finals where they were eliminated by a Castile/Madrid XI after a 1-2 loss, courtesy of a brace from Juan Monjardín.

== Managerial career ==
As a coach, he managed Sevilla at three different times, with his second spell being the most successful as he led his side to a triumph at the 1939 Copa del Generalísimo Final, beating Racing de Ferrol by a score of 6–2.

== Honours ==
Sevilla FC

- Copa del Generalísimo: 1 1939
