= 1945–46 La Liga =

15th season of La Liga

Primera División
- Season: 1945–46
- Champions: Sevilla (1st title)
- Relegated: Alcoyano; Hércules
- Matches: 182
- Goals: 611 (3.36 per match)
- Top goalscorer: Telmo Zarra (24 goals)
- Biggest home win: Atlético Bilbao 7–1 Castellón; Atlético Bilbao 6–0 Hércules; Real Madrid 6–0 Celta
- Biggest away win: Barcelona 0–6 Atlético Bilbao
- Highest scoring: Atlético Aviación 7–3 Español
- Longest winning run: 5 matches Atlético Bilbao
- Longest unbeaten run: 9 matches Sevilla
- Longest winless run: 11 matches Murcia
- Longest losing run: 6 matches Español; Hércules

The 1945–46 La Liga was the 15th season since its establishment. Sevilla achieved their first title ever, secured with a 1–1 draw on the final matchday away to Barcelona, their direct rivals for the championship who would have taken the trophy with a win.

== Team locations ==
Location of teams in 1945–46 La Liga

Club	City	Stadium
Alcoyano	Alcoy	El Collao
Atlético Aviación	Madrid	Metropolitano
Atlético Bilbao	Bilbao	San Mamés
Barcelona	Barcelona	Les Corts
Castellón	Castellón de la Plana	Castalia
Celta	Vigo	Balaídos
Español	Barcelona	Sarriá
Hércules	Alicante	Bardín
Murcia	Murcia	La Condomina
Oviedo	Oviedo	Buenavista
Real Gijón	Gijón	El Molinón
Real Madrid	Madrid	Chamartín
Sevilla	Seville	Nervión
Valencia	Valencia	Mestalla

Alcoyano made their debut in La Liga.

== League table ==
Pos	Team	Pld	W	D	L	GF	GA	GD	Pts	Qualification or relegation
1	Sevilla (C)	26	14	8	4	53	37	+16	36	
2	Barcelona	26	14	7	5	48	31	+17	35	
3	Atlético Bilbao	26	14	5	7	63	38	+25	33	
4	Real Madrid	26	11	9	6	46	30	+16	31	
5	Oviedo	26	10	10	6	44	37	+7	30	
6	Valencia	26	9	10	7	44	36	+8	28	
7	Atlético Aviación	26	10	6	10	50	48	+2	26 (Note: Atlético Aviación finished ahead of Castellón on head-to-head goal difference: Castellón–Atlético Aviación 2–1, Atlético Aviación–Castellón 4–0.)	
8	Castellón	26	11	4	11	38	54	−16	26	
9	Real Gijón	26	9	7	10	37	39	−2	25	
10	Celta	26	9	3	14	57	56	+1	21	
11	Murcia	26	5	10	11	21	39	−18	20	
12	Español (O)	26	6	7	13	41	53	−12	19 (Note: Español finished ahead of Alcoyano on head-to-head points: Español–Alcoyano 2–1, Alcoyano–Español 1–1.)	Qualification for the relegation play-offs
13	Alcoyano (R)	26	7	5	14	39	54	−15	19	Relegated to the Segunda División
14	Hércules (R)	26	5	5	16	30	59	−29	15	Relegated to the Segunda División

Source: BDFútbol
Rules for classification: 1) points; 2) head-to-head points; 3) head-to-head goal difference; 4) goal difference; 5) number of goals scored.
(C) Champions; (O) Play-off winners; (R) Relegated

== Results ==
Home \ Away	ALC	AAV	ATB	BAR	CAS	CEL	ESP	HER	MUR	OVI	RGI	RMA	SEV	VAL
Alcoyano	—	3–1	3–2	3–3	3–1	4–2	1–1	3–1	1–0	1–1	4–1	1–3	1–2	1–2
Atlético Aviación	2–0	—	1–0	2–0	4–0	3–2	7–3	5–2	0–0	2–2	2–0	3–1	2–1	0–0
Atlético Bilbao	2–0	1–2	—	2–0	7–1	2–1	3–1	6–0	6–1	2–4	2–3	3–2	4–3	2–2
Barcelona	2–0	2–1	0–6	—	4–0	3–1	1–0	5–3	1–1	4–0	2–0	1–0	1–1	1–1
Castellón	2–1	2–1	4–0	1–1	—	2–1	4–1	2–1	3–0	1–1	2–0	0–3	2–2	1–0
Celta	6–1	6–1	1–2	1–5	4–0	—	4–1	4–2	1–1	3–2	2–3	3–0	4–0	1–1
Español	2–1	4–3	1–5	0–2	4–1	4–1	—	5–2	0–1	1–2	2–2	1–1	1–1	4–0
Hércules	1–0	3–2	0–0	0–0	1–2	1–4	0–0	—	2–0	0–3	2–1	2–3	1–2	2–1
Murcia	2–3	0–0	0–0	0–2	2–3	1–0	2–2	1–1	—	0–3	1–0	1–0	1–1	2–2
Oviedo	3–2	3–3	1–2	1–1	4–2	1–0	1–0	2–0	0–0	—	2–2	1–1	1–1	3–0
Real Gijón	1–1	3–2	0–0	2–0	2–0	2–1	4–1	2–0	0–2	1–0	—	1–1	1–2	1–2
Real Madrid	1–0	2–1	1–1	3–2	4–0	6–0	0–0	2–0	3–1	3–1	2–2	—	1–1	1–1
Sevilla	4–2	3–0	4–2	2–3	3–2	3–3	1–0	2–1	3–1	3–0	3–2	2–1	—	3–0
Valencia	6–1	6–1	1–2	0–1	2–0	5–1	3–2	2–2	2–0	2–2	1–1	1–1	1–0	—

Source: BDFútbol
Legend: Blue = home team win; Yellow = draw; Red = away team win.

== Relegation play-offs ==
The match and the replay match were played at Estadio Olímpico de Montjuïc.

Team 1	Agg.	Team 2	1st leg	2nd leg
Español	3–0	Gimnástico	0–0	3–0

== Top scorers ==
Rank	Player	Team	Goals
1	(Spain) Telmo Zarra	Atlético Bilbao	24
2	(Spain) Pruden	Real Madrid	20
2	(Spain) Mundo	Valencia	20
4	(Spain) Ángel Cabido	Oviedo	19
5	(Spain) Basilio	Castellón	15
5	(Spain) José Campos	Sevilla	15
5	(Spain) Pahiño	Celta	15
8	(Spain) Juan Arza	Sevilla	14
9	(Spain) Ángel Calvo	Español	13
10	(Spain) César Rodríguez	Barcelona	12
