= 1939 Copa del Generalísimo =

37th Copa del Rey

Tournament details
- Country: Spain
- Teams: 14

Final positions
- Champions: Sevilla FC (2nd title)
- Runners-up: Racing Ferrol

Tournament statistics
- Matches played: 25

The 1939 Copa del Generalísimo was the 37th staging of the Copa del Rey, the Spanish football cup competition.

The competition started on 14 May 1939 and concluded on 25 June 1939 with the final, held at the Montjuïc Stadium in Barcelona.

== Round of 12 ==
| Team 1 | Agg. | Team 2 | 1st leg | 2nd leg |
|---|---|---|---|---|
| Racing Ferrol | withdrew | Asturias XI | | |
| Juventud Unión Montañesa | 1–7 | Oriamendi Sport | 0–2 | 1–5 |
| Bilbao Athletic | 3–8 | CD Alavés | 1–2 | 2–6 |
| CA Osasuna | 1–4 | Real Zaragoza | 0–1 | 1–3 |
| Real Betis | 1–5 | Aviación Nacional | 1–1 | 0–4 |
| Ceuta Sport | 4–6 | Sevilla FC | 3–4 | 1–2 |

Source: RSSSF

- Racing Santander and Donostia received a bye.

== Quarter-finals ==
| Team 1 | Agg. | Team 2 | 1st leg | 2nd leg |
|---|---|---|---|---|
| Racing Ferrol | 3–1 | Donostia | 3–1 | 0–0 |
| Oriamendi Sport | 4–3 | Real Zaragoza | 2–1 | 2–2 |
| Aviación Nacional | 3–4 | Sevilla FC | 2–0 | 1–4 |
| Racing Santander | 3–7 | CD Alavés | 2–5 | 1–2 |

Sources: RSSSF; BDFutbol

== Semi-finals ==
| Team 1 | Agg. | Team 2 | 1st leg | 2nd leg |
|---|---|---|---|---|
| Racing Ferrol | 3–2 | Baracaldo Oriamendi | 1–1 | 2–1 |
| Sevilla FC | 7–6 | CD Alavés | 6–5 | 1–1 |

Sources: RSSSF; BDFutbol

== Final ==
| Team 1 | Score | Team 2 |
|---|---|---|
| Sevilla FC | 6–2 | Racing Ferrol |

Sources: RSSSF; BDFutbol

Copa del Rey 1939 winners
Sevilla FC
2nd title
