= Campanal I =

Spanish footballer (1912–1984)

Personal information
- Full name: Guillermo González del Río García
- Date of birth: 9 February 1912
- Place of birth: Avilés, Spain
- Date of death: 22 January 1984 (aged 71)
- Place of death: Seville, Spain
- Position: Striker

Senior career*
Years	Team	Apps	(Gls)
1927–1929	Sporting Gijón	7	(12)
1929–1946	Sevilla	222	(168)

International career
1934–1941	Spain	3	(2)

Managerial career
- 1946–1948: Málaga
- 1949–1953: Sevilla
- 1957: Sevilla
- 1959: Sevilla
- * Club domestic league appearances and goals

Guillermo González del Río García, nicknamed Campanal I or Guillermo Campanal (born 9 February 1912 in Avilés; died 22 January 1984 in Seville) was a Spanish footballer. During his career he played for Sporting de Gijón and Sevilla FC (1929–1946), and earned 3 caps and scored 2 goals for the Spain national football team, and participated in the 1934 FIFA World Cup.

He later became manager of Sevilla FC.

== Honours ==
Sevilla

- La Liga: 1945–46
- Copa del Rey: 1935, 1939
