= 1956–57 Real Madrid CF season =

54th season in existence of Real Madrid CF

Real Madrid Club de Futbol
1956–57 season
- President: Santiago Bernabéu
- Manager: José Villalonga
- Stadium: Estadio Santiago Bernabéu
- Primera Division: 1st (in European Cup)
- Copa del Generalísimo: Quarter-finals
- European Cup: Winners
- Latin Cup: Winners
- Top goalscorer: Alfredo Di Stéfano (31)
| Home colours | Away colours |

The 1956–57 season was Real Madrid Club de Fútbol's 54th season in existence and the club's 26th consecutive season in the top flight of Spanish football.

Real Madrid won their 5th Primera División title.

== Summary ==
The Spanish Federation lifted the ban on foreign player transfers allowing chairman Santiago Bernabéu to buy French playmaker Raymond Kopa from Stade de Reims to boost the midfield as a winger, in fact the trade was released days before the 1956 European Cup Final against the same French squad. Due to the rule of limited foreigners Kopa could not feature until October, when Di Stefano became a Spanish citizen. The team finished the League campaign 5 points above Sevilla and FC Barcelona, clinching its fifth League title ever. Also, Alfredo Di Stéfano won the top scorer trophy with 31 goals.

Initially, due to the rule of not being a current league champion, the club would not compete in the continental tournament. However, chairman Santiago Bernabéu, also an organizer of the competition, allowed their entry as holders; the squad won its second consecutive European Cup in a close final against Italian team Fiorentina. In May, the club reached the quarter-finals of the Copa del Generalísimo where they were defeated 6–1 (8–3 on aggregate) by Barcelona. It would be the only trophy not conquered by the squad in the campaign. The team closed a superb season clinching its second Latin Cup, winning the final against Portuguese side Benfica.

== Squad ==
Note: Flags indicate national team as defined under FIFA eligibility rules; some limited exceptions apply. Players may hold more than one non-FIFA nationality.

| No. | Pos. | Nation | Player |
|---|---|---|---|
| — | GK | ESP | Juan Alonso |
| — | GK | ESP | Javier Berasaluce |
| — | DF | ESP | Marquitos |
| — | DF | ESP | Navarro |
| — | DF | ESP | Ángel Atienza |
| — | DF | ESP | Rafael Lesmes |
| — | DF | ESP | Pedro Casado |
| — | | ESP | Joaquín Oliva |
| — | MF | ESP | Juan Santisteban Troyano |
| — | MF | ESP | Miguel Muñoz |

| No. | Pos. | Nation | Player |
|---|---|---|---|
| — | MF | ESP | Antonio Ruiz |
| — | MF | ESP | Zárraga |
| — | MF | FRA | Raymond Kopa |
| — | MF | ESP | José Becerril |
| — | FW | ESP | Ramón Marsal |
| — | FW | ARG | Héctor Rial |
| — | FW | ARG | Alfredo Di Stéfano |
| — | FW | ESP | Francisco Gento |
| — | FW | ESP | Joseíto |
| — | FW | ARG | Roque Olsen |
| — | FW | ESP | Enrique Mateos |

=== Transfers ===
In
| Pos. | Name | From | Type |
|---|---|---|---|
| MF | (France) Raymond Kopa | (France) Stade Reims | - |
| MF | (Spain) Juan Santisteban Troyano | | - |
| DF | (Spain) Pedro Casado | | - |
| DF | (Spain) Antonio Ruiz | | - |
| DF | (Spain) Carlos Sutter | | - |
| MF | (Spain) Julio Roth | España de Tanger | - |
| DF | (Spain) Manuel Torres | Zaragoza | - |
| MF | (Spain) Montejano | Badajoz | - |

Out
| Pos. | Name | To | Type |
|---|---|---|---|
| GK | (Spain) Juan García | Murcia | - |
| DF | (Spain) Antonio González | Tarrasa | - |
| FW | (Spain) Carlos Cela | Real Betis | - |
| DF | (Spain) Carlos Sutter | Cordoba | - |
| MF | (Spain) Wilson Jones | Zaragoza | - |
| FW | (Spain) Heliodoro Castaño | Jaen | - |
| MF | (Spain) Julio Roth | Hercules | - |
| MF | (Spain) Manolin | Zaragoza | - |
| FW | (Spain) Seoane | Celta | - |
| MF | (Spain) Montejano | Cadiz | - |
| FW | (Spain) Lera | Murcia | - |

== Competitions ==
=== La Liga ===
==== League table ====
| Pos | Team | Pld | W | D | L | GF | GA | GD | Pts | Qualification or relegation |
|---|---|---|---|---|---|---|---|---|---|---|
| 1 | Real Madrid (C) | 30 | 20 | 4 | 6 | 74 | 35 | +39 | 44 | Qualification for the European Cup first round and for the Latin Cup |
| 2 | Sevilla | 30 | 17 | 5 | 8 | 64 | 49 | +15 | 39 | Qualification for the European Cup preliminary round (Note: Sevilla qualified for the European Cup as Real Madrid qualified as title holders.) |
| 3 | Barcelona | 30 | 16 | 7 | 7 | 70 | 37 | +33 | 39 | |
| 4 | Atlético Bilbao | 30 | 16 | 5 | 9 | 59 | 45 | +14 | 37 | |
| 5 | Atlético Madrid | 30 | 15 | 4 | 11 | 65 | 45 | +20 | 34 | |

Source: BDFútbol
Rules for classification: 1) Points; 2) Head-to-head results; 3) Goal difference; 4) Number of goals scored
(C) Champions

==== Position by round ====
| Round | 1 | 2 | 3 | 4 | 5 | 6 | 7 | 8 | 9 | 10 | 11 | 12 | 13 | 14 | 15 | 16 | 17 | 18 | 19 | 20 | 21 | 22 | 23 | 24 | 25 | 26 | 27 | 28 | 29 | 30 |
|---|---|---|---|---|---|---|---|---|---|---|---|---|---|---|---|---|---|---|---|---|---|---|---|---|---|---|---|---|---|---|
| Ground | H | A | H | A | H | A | H | A | H | A | H | A | H | H | A | A | H | A | H | A | H | A | H | A | H | A | H | A | A | H |
| Result | W | D | D | L | W | W | W | W | W | L | W | W | W | D | W | W | W | L | W | D | L | W | W | L | W | L | W | W | W | W |
| Position | 1 | 1 | 4 | 8 | 4 | 4 | 2 | 2 | 1 | 2 | 1 | 1 | 1 | 1 | 1 | 1 | 1 | 1 | 1 | 1 | 1 | 1 | 1 | 1 | 1 | 1 | 1 | 1 | 1 | 1 |

Source: www.lfp.es
A = Away; H = Home; W = Win; D = Draw; L = Loss; = Leader, 1957–58 European Cup

==== Matches ====
| 9 September 1956 1 | Real Madrid | 6–0 | CD Condal | Madrid |
| | Di Stéfano 4'; Gento 28'; Di Stéfano 55'; Rial 60'; Di Stéfano 70'; Gento 80' | Report | | Stadium: Nuevo Chamartín; Referee: Rey Martinez |

| 16 September 1956 2 | Español | 0–0 | Real Madrid | Barcelona |
| | | Report | | Stadium: Camp de Les Corts; Referee: Mosquera Maceiras |

| 23 September 1956 3 | Real Madrid | 1–1 | Sevilla CF | Madrid |
| | Gento 31' | Report | Pepillo 70' | Stadium: Nuevo Chamartín; Referee: Gonzalez Echeverria |

| 30 September 1956 4 | Osasuna | 2–0 | Real Madrid | Pamplona |
| | Vila 21', 80' | Report | | Stadium: San Juan; Referee: Bielsa Naval |

| 7 October 1956 5 | Real Madrid | 3–1 | Real Valladolid | Madrid |
| | Di Stéfano 21'; Di Stéfano 37'; Mateos 61' | Report | Murillo 53' | Stadium: Nuevo Chamartín; Referee: Birigay Nieva |

| 14 October 1956 6 | Atlético Madrid | 2–4 | Real Madrid | Madrid |
| | Collar 51'; Agustín 61' | Report | Mateos 11'; Di Stéfano 36'; Mateos 47'; Joseíto 84' | Referee: Blanco Perez |

| 21 October 1956 7 | Real Madrid | 7–1 | Real Jaén | Madrid |
| | Gento 1'; Marsal 10'; Di Stéfano 17'; Marsal 24'; Di Stéfano 29'; Kopa 72'; Kopa 89' (pen.) | Report | Paseiro 83' | Referee: Bielsa Naval |

| 28 October 1956 8 | Deportivo La Coruña | 1–2 | Real Madrid | La Coruña |
| | Arsenio Iglesias 7' | Report | Di Stéfano 34'; Di Stéfano 49' | Stadium: Nuevo Riazor; Referee: Gomez Arribas |

| 4 November 1956 9 | Real Madrid | 3–0 | Atletico de Bilbao | Madrid |
| | Mateos 14'; Kopa 26'; Gento 60' | Report | | Stadium: Nuevo Chamartín; Referee: Azon Roma |

| 11 November 1956 10 | CF Barcelona | 1–0 | Real Madrid | Barcelona |
| | Luis Suárez 46' | Report | | Stadium: Estadio del CF Barcelona; Referee: Ortiz de Mendibil |

| 18 November 1956 11 | Real Madrid | 3–0 | Real Sociedad | Madrid |
| | Di Stéfano 22'; Joseíto 36'; Joseíto 41' | Report | | Stadium: Chamartín; Referee: Gardeazabal Garay |

| 25 November 1956 12 | Valencia CF | 1–2 | Real Madrid | Valencia |
| | Seguí 82'; Goyo 21' | Report | Di Stéfano 52'; Di Stéfano 89' | Referee: Blanco Perez |

| 2 December 1956 13 | Real Madrid | 3–0 | UD Las Palmas | Madrid |
| | Mateos 22'; Gento 37'; Zárraga 49' | Report | | Stadium: Chamartín; Referee: Garcia Fernandez |

| 16 December 1956 14 | Real Madrid | 3–3 | Real Zaragoza | Madrid |
| | Di Stéfano 66'; Di Stéfano 75'; Di Stéfano 84' | Report | Domingo 41'; Serer 60'; Domingo 69' | Stadium: Chamartín; Referee: Mosquera Maceiras |

| 23 December 1956 15 | Celta de Vigo | 0–3 | Real Madrid | Vigo |
| | | Report | Di Stéfano 10'; Joseíto 53'; Mateos 87' | Stadium: Estadio de Balaídos; Referee: Rey Martinez |

| 29 December 1956 16 | CD Condal | 0–1 | Real Madrid | Barcelona |
| | | Report | Joseíto 53' | Stadium: Camp de Les Corts; Referee: Gardeazabal Garay |

| 6 January 1957 17 | Real Madrid | 7–2 | Español | Madrid |
| | Gento 4'; Di Stéfano 8'; Joseíto 35'; Joseíto 80'; Joseíto 83'; Mateos 85'; Di Stéfano 88' (pen.) | Report | Sastre 49'; Coll 65' | Stadium: Nuevo Chamartín; Referee: Ortiz de Mendibil |

| 13 January 1957 18 | Sevilla CF | 2–0 | Real Madrid | Sevilla |
| | Pepillo 30'; Pauet 89' | Report | | Referee: Bielsa Naval |

| 20 January 1957 19 | Real Madrid | 2–1 | Osasuna | Madrid |
| | Kopa 50'; Marsal 80' | Report | Teré 52' | Stadium: Nuevo Chamartín; Referee: Garcia Fernandez |

| 27 January 1957 20 | Real Valladolid | 3–3 | Real Madrid | Valladolid |
| | Gallet 10'; Cerdán 14'; Badenes 73' | Report | Di Stéfano 2'; Kopa 58'; Di Stéfano 70' | Referee: Gonzalez Echeverria |

| 3 February 1957 21 | Real Madrid | 0–2 | Atlético Madrid | Madrid |
| | | Report | Peiró 28'; Miguel 31' | Stadium: Chamartín; Referee: Gardeazabal Garay |

| 10 February 1957 22 | Real Jaén | 2–4 | Real Madrid | Jaén |
| | Arregui 39'; Arregui 58' | Report | Joseíto 19'; Di Stéfano 25'; Di Stéfano 45' (pen.); Mateos 70' | Stadium: La Victoria; Referee: Azon Roma |

| 17 February 1957 23 | Real Madrid | 1–0 | Deportivo La Coruña | La Coruña |
| | Mateos 25'; Juan Alonso71 | Report | | Referee: Birigay Nieva |

| 24 February 1957 24 | Atletico de Bilbao | 4–2 | Real Madrid | Bilbao |
| | Uribe 1', 55', 60'; Marcaida 5' | Report | Joseíto 22'; Raymond Kopa 53' | Referee: Rey Martinez |

| 3 March 1957 25 | Real Madrid | 1–0 | FC Barcelona | Madrid |
| | Joseíto 21' | Report | | Referee: González Echeverria |

| 17 March 1957 26 | Real Sociedad | 3–0 | Real Madrid | San Sebastián |
| | Ucelay 19', 60'; Paz 82' | Report | | Stadium: Atocha; Referee: Blanco Perez |

| 24 March 1957 27 | Real Madrid | 2–0 | Valencia CF | Madrid |
| | Mateos 32'; Di Stéfano 51' | Report | | Stadium: Nuevo Chamartín; Referee: Gomez Arribas |

| 7 April 1957 28 | UD Las Palmas | 1–5 | Real Madrid | Las Palmas |
| | Vázquez 4' | Report | Di Stéfano 12'; Di Stéfano 30'; Di Stéfano 53'; Di Stéfano 56'; Mateos 89' | Stadium: Estadio Insular; Referee: Blanco Perez |

| 14 April 1957 29 | Real Zaragoza | 1–2 | Real Madrid | Zaragoza |
| | Wilson 9' | Report | Mateos 35'; Mateos 70' | Stadium: La Romareda; Referee: Gonzalez Echeverria |

| 21 April 1957 30 | Real Madrid | 4–1 | Celta de Vigo | Madrid |
| | Di Stéfano 10'; Di Stéfano 32' (pen.); Mateos 54'; Di Stéfano 82' | Report | Mauro 69' | Stadium: Chamartín; Referee: Ortiz de Mendibil |

=== Copa del Generalísimo ===
==== Round of 16 ====
| 28 April 1957 | Las Palmas | 1–4 | Real Madrid | Las Palmas |

| 1 May 1957 | Real Madrid | 1–0 | Las Palmas | Madrid |
| | | | | Stadium: Chamartín |

==== Quarter-finals ====
| 12 May 1957 | Real Madrid | 2–2 | FC Barcelona | Madrid |
| | Di Stefano 20'; Di Stefano 34' | | 14' Kubala; 52' Basora | Stadium: Santiago Bernabeu; Referee: Birigay Nieva |

| 19 May 1957 | FC Barcelona | 6–1 | Real Madrid | Barcelona |
| | Martinez 4'; Kubala 34'; Martinez 48'; Martinez 50'; Martinez 62'; Villaverde 80' | | 75' (o.g.) Olivella | Referee: Gonzalez Echeverria |

=== European Cup ===
==== Round of 16 ====
| 1 November 1956 | Real Madrid (Spain) | 4–2 | (Austria) Rapid Wien | Madrid |
| | Di Stéfano 9', 21'; Marsal 60', 63' | Report | Dienst 58'; Gießer 90' | Stadium: Santiago Bernabéu Stadium; Attendance: 100,000; Referee: (Switzerland) Gottfried Dienst |

| 14 November 1956 | Rapid Wien (Austria) | 3–1 | (Spain) Real Madrid | Wien |
| | Happel 18', 38' (pen.), 40' | Report | Di Stéfano 60' | Stadium: Praterstadion; Attendance: 60,000; Referee: (France) Maurice Guigue |

| 13 December 1956 replay | Real Madrid (Spain) | 2–0 | (Austria) Rapid Wien | Madrid |
| | Joseíto 1'; Kopa 23' | Report | | Stadium: Santiago Bernabéu Stadium; Attendance: 100,000; Referee: (England) Alfred Bond |

==== Quarter-finals ====
| 14 February 1957 | Real Madrid (Spain) | 3–0 | (France) Nice | Madrid |
| | Joseíto 18'; Mateos 49', 72' | Report | | Stadium: Santiago Bernabéu Stadium, Attendance: 110,000; Referee: (Belgium) Gérard Versyp |

| 14 March 1957 | Nice (France) | 2–3 | (Spain) Real Madrid | Nice |
| | Foix 15'; Ferry 82' (pen.) | Report | Joseíto 45'; Di Stéfano 50', 79' | Stadium: Stade du Ray; Attendance: 21,724; Referee: (England) John Husband |

==== Semi-finals ====
| 11 April 1957 | Real Madrid (Spain) | 3–1 | (England) Manchester United | Madrid |
| | Rial 61'; Di Stéfano 63'; Mateos 83' | Report | Taylor 82' | Stadium: Chamartín; Attendance: 120,000; Referee: (Netherlands) Leopold Sylvain Horn |

| 25 April 1957 | Manchester United (England) | 2–2 | (Spain) Real Madrid | Manchester |
| | Taylor 62'; Charlton 85' | Report | Kopa 25'; Rial 33' | Stadium: Old Trafford; Attendance: 65,000; Referee: (France) Marcel Lequesne |

==== Final ====
| 30 May 1957 | Real Madrid (Spain) | 2–0 | (Italy) Fiorentina | Madrid |
| | Di Stéfano 69' (pen.); Gento 75' | Report | | Stadium: Chamartín; Attendance: 120,000; Referee: (Netherlands) Leo Horn |

=== Latin Cup ===
==== Semi-finals ====
| 20 June 1957 | Milan (Italy) | 1–5 | (Spain) Real Madrid | Santiago Bernabeu |
| | 29' Cugciahori | | Gento 19'; Gento 46'; Di Stefano 50'; Joseito 83'; Gento 86' |

==== Final ====
| 23 June 1957 | Benfica (Portugal) | 0–1 | (Spain) Real Madrid | Madrid |
| | (red card) 56' Zizinho | | Di Stefano 50' | Stadium: Santiago Bernabeu; Referee: Lequesme |

== Statistics ==
=== Squad statistics ===
| competition | points | total | | | | | | GD |
| competition | points | G | V | N | P | Gf | Gs | GD |
|---|---|---|---|---|---|---|---|---|
| La Liga | 44 | 30 | 20 | 4 | 6 | 72 | 41 | +31 |
| Copa del Generalísimo | – | 4 | 4 | 1 | 1 | 14 | 6 | +8 |
| European Cup | – | 6 | 4 | 1 | 1 | 14 | 6 | +8 |
| Latin Cup | – | 2 | 2 | 0 | 0 | 6 | 1 | +5 |
| Total | | 54 | 38 | 6 | 10 | 119 | 56 | +63 |

=== Players statistics ===
| No. | Pos | Nat | Player | Total | | Primera Division | | European Cup | | Copa del Generalisimo | | Latin Cup | |
| No. | Pos | Nat | Player | Apps | Goals | Apps | Goals | Apps | Goals | Apps | Goals | Apps | Goals |
|---|---|---|---|---|---|---|---|---|---|---|---|---|---|
| | GK | (Spain) ESP | Alonso | 33 | -46 | 20 | -26 | 7 | -10 | 4 | -9 | 2 | -1 |
| | DF | (Spain) ESP | Marquitos | 31 | 0 | 19 | 0 | 6 | 0 | 4 | 0 | 2 | 0 |
| | DF | (Spain) ESP | Atienza | 30 | 0 | 26 | 0 | 4 | 0 | 0 | 0 | 0 | 0 |
| | DF | (Spain) ESP | Lesmes | 38 | 0 | 26 | 0 | 8 | 0 | 2 | 0 | 2 | 0 |
| | DF | (Spain) ESP | Zárraga | 39 | 1 | 28 | 1 | 8 | 0 | 3 | 0 | 0 | 0 |
| | MF | (Spain) ESP | Santisteban | 24 | 0 | 19 | 0 | 2 | 0 | 3 | 0 | 0 | 0 |
| | MF | (Spain) ESP | Joseíto | 32 | 17 | 22 | 11 | 4 | 3 | 4 | 2 | 2 | 1 |
| | FW | (France) FRA | Kopa | 32 | 8 | 22 | 6 | 8 | 2 | 2 | 0 | 0 | 0 |
| | FW | (Argentina) ARG | Di Stefano | 43 | 43 | 30 | 31 | 8 | 7 | 3 | 3 | 2 | 2 |
| | FW | (Spain) ESP | Mateos | 30 | 17 | 21 | 14 | 6 | 3 | 3 | 0 | 0 | 0 |
| | FW | (Spain) ESP | Gento | 40 | 11 | 27 | 7 | 8 | 1 | 3 | 0 | 2 | 3 |
| | GK | (Spain) ESP | Berasaluce | 11 | -9 | 11 | -9 | 0 | 0 | 0 | 0 | 0 | 0 |
| | DF | (Spain) ESP | Navarro | 4 | 0 | 2 | 0 | 0 | 0 | 2 | 0 | 0 | 0 |
| | DF | (Spain) ESP | Oliva | 12 | 0 | 10 | 0 | 2 | 0 | 0 | 0 | 0 | 0 |
| | MF | (Spain) ESP | Muñoz | 21 | 0 | 12 | 0 | 6 | 0 | 1 | 0 | 2 | 0 |
| | MF | (Spain) ESP | Molowny | 7 | 2 | 6 | 1 | 0 | 0 | 1 | 1 | 0 | 0 |
| | FW | (Argentina) ARG | Rial | 14 | 3 | 5 | 1 | 3 | 2 | 4 | 0 | 2 | 0 |
| | FW | (Argentina) ARG | Roque Olsen | 4 | 1 | 3 | 0 | 0 | 0 | 1 | 1 | 0 | 0 |
| | MF | (Spain) ESP | Becerril | 9 | 0 | 7 | 0 | 2 | 0 | 0 | 00 | 0 | 0 |
| | FW | (Spain) ESP | Marsal | 21 | 5 | 17 | 3 | 3 | 2 | 1 | 0 | 0 | 0 |
| | DF | (Spain) ESP | Casado | 3 | 0 | 3 | 0 | 0 | 0 | 0 | 0 | 0 | 0 |
| | MF | (Spain) ESP | Ruiz | 4 | 0 | 1 | 0 | 0 | 0 | 1 | 0 | 2 | 0 |
| | MF | (Spain) ESP | Rubio | 1 | 0 | 0 | 0 | 0 | 0 | 1 | 0 | 0 | 0 |
| | DF | (Spain) ESP | Torres | 5 | 0 | 0 | 0 | 0 | 0 | 3 | 0 | 2 | 0 |

- Source: http://www.bdfutbol.com/en/t/t1956-572.html
