= 1954–55 Real Madrid CF season =

52nd season in existence of Real Madrid CF

Real Madrid Club de Fútbol
1954–55 season
- President: Santiago Bernabéu
- Manager: Enrique Fernandez Viola (Until 9 December 1954); José Villalonga
- Stadium: Nuevo Chamartín (until 4 January 1955); Santiago Bernabéu
- Primera Division: 1st (in Latin Cup and European Cup)
- Copa del Generalísimo: Semi-finals
- Latin Cup: Winners
- Top goalscorer: Alfredo Di Stéfano (25)
Home colours	Away colours

The 1954–55 season was Real Madrid Club de Fútbol's 52nd season in existence and the club's 24th consecutive season in the top flight of Spanish football.

Real Madrid successfully defended their league championship securing a fourth Primera División title.

== Summary ==
The club won the second league championship in a row despite changes on the bench: a young Villalonga who was appointed manager of Real Madrid in the middle of the season replacing Enrique Fernandez Viola. Meanwhile, it was a great campaign for Francisco Gento and the club acquired Argentine Héctor Rial from the Nacional Montevideo, an arrival to boost the offensive line. Argentine forward Alfredo Di Stéfano scored 25 goals playing another superb season. After its fourth ever league win (second in a row), the team proceeded to clinch the Latin Cup in June. However, in the Copa del Generalísimo, without Di Stéfano (who still had not obtained his Spanish citizenship), Madrid were knocked out in the semi-finals by Sevilla. Also, winning the domestic title gave Real Madrid the right to participate in the inaugural 1955–56 European Cup season.

== Squad ==
Note: Flags indicate national team as defined under FIFA eligibility rules; some limited exceptions apply. Players may hold more than one non-FIFA nationality.

No.	Pos.	Nation	Player
-	GK	ESP	Juanito
-	GK	ESP	Juan Alonso
-	GK	ESP	Cosme
-	DF	ESP	Joaquin Navarro
-	DF	ESP	Joaquín Oliva
-	DF	ESP	Rafael Lesmes
-	DF	ESP	José María Zárraga
-	DF	ESP	Ángel Atienza Landeta
-	DF	ESP	Marcos Alonso

No.	Pos.	Nation	Player
-	MF	ESP	Miguel Muñoz
-	MF	ESP	Luis Molowny
-	FW	ARG	Héctor Rial
-	FW	ARG	Alfredo Di Stéfano
-	FW	ESP	Joseíto
-	FW	ESP	Francisco Gento
-	FW	ESP	José Luis Perez Payá
-	FW	ARG	Roque Olsen
-	FW	ESP	Mateos

=== Transfers ===
In
Pos.	Name	From	Type
DF	Marquitos	Racing Santander	
DF	Atienza	Real Zaragoza	–
FW	Hector Rial	Nacional	–
MF	Mario Duran Rubies	Hercules	–
FW	Heliodoro Castaño Pedrosa	Mestalla	–
MF	Manolin	Athletic	–
FW	Ramón Marsal	Hercules	–
GK	Garcia		–
MF	Trujillo		–

Out
Pos.	Name	To	Type
GK	Manuel Pazos	Hercules	–
MF	Sergio Rodriguez Viera	Hercules	–
FW	Juan Vazquez Toledo	Las Palmas	–
DF	Gabriel Alonso	CD Malaga	–
FW	Alvarito	Aviles	–
DF	Seoane	Hercules	–
MF	Jesus Narro		–
MF	Goñi	Racing Santander	–
MF	Eduardo Sobrado	Racing Santander	–

== Competitions ==
=== La Liga ===
==== League table ====
Pos	Team	Pld	W	D	L	GF	GA	GD	Pts	Qualification or relegation
1	Real Madrid (C)	30	20	6	4	80	31	+49	46	Qualification for the European Cup and for the Latin Cup
2	Barcelona	30	17	7	6	75	39	+36	41	Invited for the Inter-Cities Fairs Cup
3	Atlético Bilbao	30	15	9	6	78	39	+39	39	
4	Sevilla	30	15	4	11	74	58	+16	34	
5	Valencia	30	15	3	12	71	60	+11	33	

Source: BDFútbol
Rules for classification: 1) Points; 2) Head-to-head results; 3) Goal difference; 4) Number of goals scored
(C) Champions

==== Results by round ====
Round	1	2	3	4	5	6	7	8	9	10	11	12	13	14	15	16	17	18	19	20	21	22	23	24	25	26	27	28	29	30
Ground	H	A	H	A	H	A	H	A	H	A	H	A	H	H	A	A	H	A	H	A	H	A	H	A	H	A	H	A	A	H
Result	L	W	W	D	W	L	W	W	W	W	W	D	W	W	W	W	D	D	W	L	W	W	W	L	W	D	W	D	W	W
Position	10	6	4	5	3	5	3	3	3	2	1	1	1	1	1	1	1	1	1	1	1	1	1	1	1	1	1	1	1	1

Source: Competitive matches
A = Away; H = Home; W = Win; D = Draw; L = Loss; = Leader, 1955–56 European Cup; = 1955–58 Inter-Cities Fairs Cup

==== Matches ====
12 September 1954 1	Real Madrid	1–2	Valencia CF	Madrid
	Rial 80'	Report	Faas Wilkes 9'; Seguí 16'	Stadium: Nuevo Estadio Chamartín; Referee: Echeverria

19 September 1954 2	Real Sociedad	1–3	Real Madrid	San Sebastián
	Paz 85'		Rial 32'; Di Stéfano 62' (pen.); Mateos 73'	Stadium: Atocha; Referee: Iturrioz Larrinaga

26 September 1954 3	Real Madrid	7–0	Las Palmas	Madrid
	Di Stéfano 3'; Joseíto 6'; Di Stéfano 10'; Duran 14'; Rial 18'; Joseíto 21'; Di Stéfano 88'	Report		Stadium: Nuevo Estadio Chamartín; Referee: Soler Llop

3 October 1954 4	Hércules CF	1–1	Real Madrid	Alicante
	Xirau 29'	Report	Joseíto 62'	Stadium: La Viña; Referee: Arqué Martin

10 October 1954 5	Real Madrid	4–1	CD Málaga	Madrid
	Di Stéfano 9'; Joseíto 44'; Duran 47'; Gento 68'	Report	Estruch 82'	Stadium: Chamartín; Referee: Fombona Fernandez

17 October 1954 6	Sevilla FC	1–0	Real Madrid	Sevilla
	Ayala 17'	Report		Stadium: Nervión; Referee: Aurre Larrea

24 October 1954 7	Real Madrid	3–0	Racing Santander	Madrid
	Gento 65'; Muñoz 67'; Rial 89'	Report		Stadium: Nuevo Chamartín; Referee: Iturrioz Larrinaga

31 October 1954 8	Deportivo Alavés	2–4	Real Madrid	Vitoria
	Erezuma 65'; Echeandia 87'	Report	Di Stéfano 11'; Pérez Payá 58'; Berasaluce 67' (own goal); Pérez Payá 74'	Stadium: Estadio de Mendizorroza; Referee: Soler Llop

7 November 1954 9	Real Madrid	3–1	Athletic Bilbao	Madrid
	Rial 14'; Pérez Payá 39'; Muñoz 72'	Report	Arieta 64'	Stadium: Nuevo Chamartín; Referee: Blanco Perez

14 November 1954 10	Español	1–3	Real Madrid	Barcelona
	Piquín 57'	Report	Di Stéfano 30'; Joseíto 49'; Di Stéfano 65'	Stadium: Estadio Sarriá; Referee: Garcia Fernandez

21 November 1954 11	Real Madrid	3–0	FC Barcelona	Madrid
	Di Stéfano 44' (pen.); Rial 66'; Joseíto 67'	Report		Stadium: Nuevo Chamartín; Referee: Tamarit Falaguera

28 November 1954 12	Celta Vigo	1–1	Real Madrid	Vigo
	Carlos Torres 78'	Report	Marquitos 77'	Stadium: Estadio de Balaídos; Referee: Gonzalez Echeverria

5 December 1954 13	Real Madrid	5–1	Deportivo La Coruña	Madrid
	Di Stéfano 10'; Pérez Payá 47'; Di Stéfano 52'; Pérez Payá 55'; Pérez Payá 69'	Report	Tomás 70'	Stadium: Nuevo Chamartín; Referee: Garcia Fernandez

12 December 1954 14	Real Madrid	1–0	Atlético Madrid	Madrid
	Atienza 41'	Report		Stadium: Nuevo Chamartín; Referee: Gardeazabal Garay

19 December 1954 15	Real Valladolid	0–1	Real Madrid	Valladolid
			Rial 48'	Stadium: Estadio Jose Zorrilla

26 December 1954 16	Valencia CF	1–3	Real Madrid	Valencia
	Badenes 10'	Report	Roque Olsen 40'; Di Stéfano 84'; Di Stéfano 85'	Stadium: Estadio Mestalla; Referee: Fombona Fernandez

2 January 1955 17	Real Madrid	1–1	Real Sociedad	Madrid
	Rial 78'	Report	Ontoria 47'	Stadium: Nuevo Chamartín; Referee: Soler Llop

9 January 1955 18	Las Palmas	1–1	Real Madrid	Las Palmas
	Ignacio 56'	Report	Molowny 83'	Stadium: Estadio Insular; Referee: Rivero Lecuona

16 January 1955 19	Real Madrid	3–0	Hércules CF	Madrid
	Molowny 2'; Di Stéfano 14'; Di Stéfano 28'; Navarro 85			Stadium: Nuevo Chamartín; Referee: Fombona Fernandez

23 January 1955 20	CD Málaga	3–1	Real Madrid	Málaga
	León Lasa 22'; Pauet 27'; Pauet 68'		Di Stéfano 70'	Referee: Soler Llop

30 January 1955 21	Real Madrid	3–1	Sevilla CF	Madrid
	Rial 18'; Rial 37'; Rial 50'		Juan Arza 76'	Stadium: Chamartín; Referee: Iturrioz Larrinaga

6 February 1955 22	Racing Santander	0–4	Real Madrid	Santander
	Ortega45	Report	Rial 6'; Molowny 9'; Roque Olsen 23'; Di Stéfano 61'	Stadium: Campos de Sport del Sardinero; Referee: Gardeazabal Garay

13 February 1955 23	Real Madrid	4–1	Deportivo Alavés	Madrid
	Molowny 24'; Rial 25'; Anchía 77' (own goal); Molowny 89' (pen.)	Report	Wilson 82'	Stadium: Nuevo Chamartín; Referee: Tamarit Figueroa

20 February 1955 24	Athletic Bilbao	2–0	Real Madrid	Bilbao
	Arieta 29'; Gainza 42'	Report		Stadium: Estadio San Mames; Referee: Azon Roma

27 February 1955 25	Real Madrid	5–1	Español	Madrid
	Di Stéfano 12'; Di Stéfano 26'; Rial 32'; Di Stéfano 42'; Di Stéfano 59'		Piquín 57'	Stadium: Nuevo Chamartín; Referee: Gardeazabal Garay

6 March 1955 26	FC Barcelona	2–2	Real Madrid	Barcelona
	Basora 31'; Moll 70'	Report	Gento 19'; Francisco Gento 64'	Stadium: Camp de Les Corts; Referee: Blanco Perez

20 March 1955 27	Real Madrid	5–1	Celta Vigo	Madrid
	Rial 19'; Di Stéfano 43'; Molowny 55' (pen.); Roque Olsen 65'; Gento 76'			Stadium: Nuevo Chamartín; Referee: Rivero Lecuona

27 March 1955 28	Deportivo La Coruña	3–3	Real Madrid	La Coruña
	Bazan 19'; Bazan 38'; Navarro 43' (own goal)		Gento 18'; Rial 74'; Di Stéfano 87'	Stadium: Nuevo Riazor; Referee: Garcia Fernandez

3 March 1995 29	Atlético Madrid	2–4	Real Madrid	Madrid
	Molina 49'; Molina 87'	Report	Di Stéfano 10'; Hector Rial 21'; Di Stéfano 31'; Roque Olsen 77'	Stadium: Metropolitano; Referee: Tamarit Falaguera

10 April 1955 30	Real Madrid	1–0	Real Valladolid	Madrid
	Rial 81'	Report		Stadium: Chamartín; Referee: Azón Roma

=== Copa del Generalísimo ===
==== Quarter-finals ====
1 May 1955	Real Madrid	1–1	Real Valladolid	Madrid
				Stadium: Chamartín

8 May 1955	Real Valladolid	1–4	Real Madrid	Valladolid

==== Semi-finals ====
22 May 1955	Real Madrid	1–3	Sevilla CF	Madrid
				Stadium: Chamartín

29 May 1955	Sevilla CF	5–0 (8–1 agg.)	Real Madrid	Sevilla

=== Latin Cup ===
22 June 1955	Real Madrid (Spain)	2–0	(Portugal) Os Belenenses	Paris
				Stadium: Parc des Princes; Referee: Orlandini

==== Final ====
26 June 1955	Real Madrid (Spain)	2–0	(France) Stade de Reims	Paris
	Rial 6'; Rial 68'			Stadium: Parc des Princes; Referee: Campos

== Statistics ==
=== Squad statistics ===
competition	points	total						GD
competition	points	G	V	N	P	Gf	Gs	GD
1954–55 La Liga	46	30	20	6	4	80	31	+49
Copa del Generalísimo	–	2	0	0	2	1	8	−7
Latin Cup	–	2	2	0	0	4	0	+3
Total		34	22	6	6	85	39	+46

== Squad ==
=== Players statistics ===
No.	Pos	Nat	Player	Total		Primera Division		Copa del Generalísimo		Latin Cup	
No.	Pos	Nat	Player	Apps	Goals	Apps	Goals	Apps	Goals	Apps	Goals
	GK	(Spain) ESP	Alonso	30	-34	24	-24	4	-10	2	0
	DF	(Spain) ESP	Marquitos	28	1	27	1	1	0		
	DF	(Spain) ESP	Navarro	32	0	26	0	4	0	2	0
	DF	(Spain) ESP	Lesmes	30	0	26	0	3	0	1	0
	DF	(Spain) ESP	Atienza	19	0	17	0	1	0	1	0
	MF	(Spain) ESP	Muñoz	33	2	30	2	1	0	2	0
	MF	(Spain) ESP	Joseíto	18	8	15	6	3	2		
	FW	(Spain) ESP	Perez Payá	21	11	16	6	3	4	2	1
	FW	(Argentina) ARG	Rial	36	20	30	18	4	0	2	2
	FW	(Argentina) ARG	Di Stefano	32	25	30	25	0	0	2	0
	FW	(Spain) ESP	Gento	29	6	24	6	3	0	2	0
	GK	(Spain) ESP	Juanito	7	-7	7	-7				
	DF	(Spain) ESP	Oliva	12	0	7	0	3	0	2	0
	DF	(Spain) ESP	Zárraga	21	1	15	0	4	0	2	1
	MF	(Spain) ESP	Molowny	15	6	12	6	1	0	2	0
	FW	(Argentina) ARG	Olsen	14	4	11	4	3	0		
	FW	(Spain) ESP	Mateos	2	1	2	1				
	GK	(Spain) ESP	Cosme	0	0	0	0				
	FW	(Spain) ESP	Duran	6	2	6	2				
	FW	(Spain) ESP	Atienza	2	0	0	0	2	0		
	FW	(Spain) ESP	Castaño	1	0	0	0	1	0		
	FW	(Spain) ESP	Manolin	3	0	0	0	3	0		

- Source: https://www.bdfutbol.com/en/t/t1954-552.html
