= 1955–56 Real Madrid CF season =

53rd season in existence of Real Madrid CF

Real Madrid Club de Fútbol
1955–56 season
- President: Santiago Bernabéu
- Manager: José Villalonga
- Stadium: Chamartín
- Primera Division: 3rd
- Copa del Generalísimo: Semi-finals
- European Cup: Winners
- Top goalscorer: Alfredo Di Stéfano (24)
Home colours	Away colours

The 1955–56 season was Real Madrid Club de Fútbol's 53rd season in existence and the club's 25th consecutive season in the top flight of Spanish football.

== Summary ==
The season is remembered for the first ever European Cup win, defeating Raymond Kopa and Just Fontaine's Stade de Reims with a 4–3 score.

The team reached the semi-finals of the Copa del Generalísimo (losing to Athletic Bilbao 3–4 on aggregate without Di Stéfano) and finished third in the league 10 points behind champions Bilbao with a record 81 goals scored.

== Squad ==
Note: Flags indicate national team as defined under FIFA eligibility rules; some limited exceptions apply. Players may hold more than one non-FIFA nationality.

No.	Pos.	Nation	Player
—	GK	ESP	Juan Alonso
—	GK	ESP	Berasaluce
—	DF	ESP	Marquitos
—	DF	ESP	Navarro
—	DF	ESP	Oliva
—	DF	ESP	Lesmes II
—	DF	ESP	Zárraga
—	DF	ESP	Ángel Atienza Landeta
—	MF	ESP	Miguel Muñoz
—	MF	ESP	Luis Molowny
—	MF	ESP	Wilson Alfredo Jones
—	FW	ARG	Rial

No.	Pos.	Nation	Player
—	FW	ARG	Alfredo Di Stéfano
—	FW	ESP	Joseíto
—	FW	ESP	Francisco Gento
—	FW	ESP	José Luis Perez Payá
—	FW	ARG	Roque Olsen
—	FW	ESP	Ramón Marsal
—	MF	ESP	Becerril
—	MF	ESP	Manolín
—	FW	ESP	Heliodoro Castaño Pedrosa
—	MF	ESP	Rubio
—	FW	ESP	Enrique Mateos

=== Transfers ===
In
Pos.	Name	From	Type
GK	Berasaluce	Deportivo Alaves	-
MF	Rubio	Murcia	-
DF	Arturo Seoane	Hercules	-
DF	Antonio Gonzalez		-
GK	Juan Visa		-
FW	Carlos Cela	RCD Espanyol	-

Out
Pos.	Name	To	Type
GK	Cosme	Cultural Leonesa	-
MF	Mario Duran	Real Oviedo	-
FW	Adolfo Atienza	Las Palmas	-
DF	Aurelio Campa	Las Palmas	-
DF	Felix Carrillo	CD Malaga	-
MF	Taranco	Extremadura	-
MF	Serrano		-
FW	Julio Cesar Britos		-

== Competitions ==
=== La Liga ===
==== League table ====
Pos	Team	Pld	W	D	L	GF	GA	GD	Pts	Qualification or relegation
1	Atlético Bilbao (C)	30	22	4	4	79	31	+48	48	Qualification for the European Cup and for the Latin Cup
2	Barcelona	30	22	3	5	67	26	+41	47	
3	Real Madrid	30	18	2	10	81	39	+42	38	Qualification for the European Cup (Note: Real Madrid qualified for the European Cup as title holders.)
4	Sevilla	30	17	2	11	75	44	+31	36	
5	Atlético Madrid	30	14	5	11	75	49	+26	33	

Source: BDFútbol
Rules for classification: 1) Points; 2) Head-to-head results; 3) Goal difference; 4) Number of goals scored
(C) Champions

==== Position by round ====
Round	1	2	3	4	5	6	7	8	9	10	11	12	13	14	15	16	17	18	19	20	21	22	23	24	25	26	27	28	29	30
Ground	A	H	A	H	A	H	A	H	A	H	A	H	A	A	H	H	A	A	H	H	A	H	A	H	A	H	A	H	H	A
Result	L	W	L	W	L	W	D	L	W	W	W	W	L	W	W	W	L	D	W	W	L	W	W	W	L	W	D	L	W	L
Position	12	10	12	8	12	9	8	6	4	4	6	3	3	3	3	3	3	3	3	3	3	3	3	3	3	3	3	3	3	3

Source: www.lfp.es
A = Away; H = Home; W = Win; D = Draw; L = Loss; = Leader, 1956–57 European Cup

==== Matches ====
11 September 1955 1	Celta de Vigo	3–1	Real Madrid	Vigo
	Cerdá 31'; Mauro 60', 75'	Report	Roque Olsen 70'	Stadium: Estadio Balaídos; Referee: Tamarit Falaguera

18 September 1955 2	Real Madrid	2–1	Atletico Bilbao	Madrid
	Di Stéfano 2'; Pérez Payá 45'	Report	Arieta 77'	Referee: Saz Olmedo

25 September 1955 3	Español	2–1	Real Madrid	Barcelona
	Arcas 21'; Oswaldo 59'	Report	Di Stéfano 5'	Stadium: Estadio Sarriá; Referee: Garcia Fernandez

2 October 1955 4	Real Madrid	2–1	Cultural Leonesa	Madrid
	Rial 75'; Di Stéfano 77'	Report	Vallejo 32'	Stadium: Chamartín

9 October 1955 5	Real Sociedad	1–0	Real Madrid	San Sebastián
	Querejeta 43'	Report		Stadium: Atocha; Referee: Guerra Prieto

16 October 1955 6	Real Madrid	3–2	Atlético Madrid	Madrid
	Joseíto 30'; Pérez Payá 47'; Di Stéfano 49'	Report	Agustín 34'; Collar 89'	Stadium: Chamartín; Referee: Rivero Lecuona

23 October 1955 7	Real Murcia	1–1	Real Madrid	Murcia
	Pallarés 5'	Report	Molowny 70'	Stadium: Estadio La Condomina; Referee: Gardeazabal Garay

30 October 1955 8	Real Madrid	1–2	Deportivo La Coruña	Madrid
	Rial 70'	Report	Pahiño 44', 75'	Stadium: Chamartín; Referee: Tamarit Falaguera

6 November 1955 9	Hércules CF	0–4	Real Madrid	Alicante
		Report	Pérez Payá 16'; Pérez Payá 29'; Rial 31'; Di Stéfano 85'	Stadium: La Viña; Referee: Blanco Perez

13 November 1955 10	Real Madrid	2–1	FC Barcelona	Madrid
	Rial 35'; Marquitos 89'	Report	Areta 77'	Stadium: Chamartín; Referee: Fombona

20 November 1955 11	Deportivo Alavés	1–2	Real Madrid	Vitoria
	Erdocia 41'	Report	Castaño 15'; Roque Olsen 23'; Roque Olsen 63'	Referee: Arque Martin

4 December 1955 12	Real Madrid	5–1	Real Valladolid	Madrid
	Rial 5'; Di Stéfano 6'; Castaño 42'; Roque Olsen 75'; Di Stéfano 89'	Report	Gallet 70'	Stadium: Chamartín; Referee: Azon Roma

18 December 1955 13	Sevilla CF	2–0	Real Madrid	Sevilla
	Quirro 7'; Pepillo 88'	Report		Stadium: Nervión; Referee: Fombona Fernandez

1 January 1956 14	UD Las Palmas	1–3	Real Madrid	Las Palmas
	Torres 51'	Report	Roque Olsen 17'; Gento 21'; Rial 83'	Stadium: Estadio Insular; Referee: Mosquera Maceiras

8 January 1956 15	Real Madrid	1–0	Valencia CF	Madrid
	Rial 2'	Report		Stadium: Chamartín; Referee: Arque Martin

15 January 1956 16	Real Madrid	8–3	Celta de Vigo	Madrid
	Di Stéfano 4'; Castaño 8'; Rial 10'; Roque Olsen 15'; Di Stéfano 22'; Roque Olsen 43'; Castaño 65'; Gento 70'	Report	Zárraga 20' (own goal); Carlos Torres 77'; Azpeitia 89'	Stadium: Estadio Santiago Bernabéu; Referee: Fombona Fernandez

22 January 1956 17	Atletico Bilbao	3–1	Real Madrid	Bilbao
	Gainza 3'; Maguregui 45'; Marcaida 77'	Report	Roque Olsen 60'	Stadium: San Mamés; Referee: Azon Roma

5 February 1956 19	Cultural Leonesa	0–4	Real Madrid	León
		Report	Roque Olsen 67'; Di Stéfano 68'; Rial 75'; Rial 88'	Stadium: La Puentecilla; Referee: Fombona Fernandez

9 February 1956 18	Real Madrid	7–1	Español	Madrid
	Di Stéfano 18'; Roque Olsen 28'; Manolín 38'; Gento 44' (pen.); Di Stéfano 58'; Di Stéfano 80'; Di Stéfano 84'	Report	Mauri 89'	Stadium: Nuevo Chamartín; Referee: Rivero Lecuona

12 February 1956 20	Real Madrid	2–0	Real Sociedad	Madrid
	Di Stéfano 22'; Gento 84'	Report		Stadium: Chamartín; Referee: Arque Martin

19 February 1956 21	Atlético Madrid	1–0	Real Madrid	Madrid
	Molina 14'	Report		Stadium: Metropolitano; Referee: Mosquera Maceiras

26 February 1956 22	Real Madrid	7–1	Real Murcia	Madrid
	Gento 17'; Gento 30'; Di Stéfano 33'; Marsal 48'; Marsal 49'; Marsal 65'; Hector Rial 70'	Report	Magritas 79'	Stadium: Chamartín; Referee: Blanco Perez

4 March 1956 23	Deportivo La Coruña	0–2	Real Madrid	A Coruña
		Report	Rubio 45'; Marsal 67'	Stadium: Estadio Riazor; Referee: Rivero Lecuona

11 March 1956 24	Real Madrid	4–1	Hércules CF	Madrid
	Rial 44'; Marsal 57'; Rial 72'; Di Stéfano 75'	Report	Xirau 32'	Referee: Ortiz de Mendibil

18 March 1956 25	FC Barcelona	2–0	Real Madrid	Barcelona
	Villaverde 18', 29'	Report		Stadium: Camp de Les Corts; Referee: Mosquera Maceiras

25 March 1956 26	Real Madrid	5–0	Deportivo Alavés	Madrid
	Marsal 14'; Mateos 24'; Di Stéfano 47'; Joseíto 62'; Gento 77'	Report		Stadium: Estadio Santiago Bernabéu; Referee: Fombona Fernandez

1 April 1956 27	Real Valladolid	2–2	Real Madrid	Valladolid
	Valdés 24'; Domingo 39'	Report	Joseíto 8'; Di Stéfano 16'	Referee: Garcia Fernandez

8 April 1956 28	Real Madrid	3–4	Sevilla CF	Madrid
	Pérez Payá 25'; Di Stéfano 46'; Joseíto 81'	Report	Pepillo 2', 38'; Guillamón 17', 49'	Stadium: Estadio Santiago Bernabéu; Referee: Rivero Lecuona

15 April 1956 29	Real Madrid	6–0	Las Palmas	Madrid
	Di Stéfano 29'; Di Stéfano 44'; Rial 51'; Rial 83'; Di Stéfano 85'; Joseíto 89'	Report		Stadium: Estadio Santiago Bernabéu; Referee: Ortiz de Mendibil

22 April 1956 30	Valencia CF	2–1	Real Madrid	Valencia
	Vila 44'; Pla 55'; Mestre	Report	Di Stéfano 64'	Stadium: Estadio Mestalla; Referee: Azon Roma

=== Copa del Generalísimo ===
==== Round of 16 ====
6 May 1956	Real Madrid	5–0	Real Sociedad	Madrid
				Stadium: Chamartín

13 May 1956	Real Sociedad	1–2	Real Madrid	San Sebastián

==== Quarter-finals ====
20 May 1956	Real Madrid	4–1	Real Valladolid	Madrid
				Stadium: Chamartín

27 May 1956	Real Valladolid	2–4	Real Madrid	Valladolid

==== Semi-finals ====
9 June 1956	Real Madrid	2–2	Athletic Bilbao	Madrid
				Stadium: Chamartín

17 June 1956	Athletic Bilbao	3–2 (5–4 agg.)	Real Madrid	Bilbao

=== European Cup ===
==== Round of 16 ====
8 September 1955	Servette (Switzerland)	0–2	(Spain) Real Madrid	Charmilles Stadium, Geneva
16:45 (CET)		Report	Muñoz 74'; Rial 89'	Attendance: 7,000; Referee: Robert Sautelle (France)

12 October 1955	Real Madrid (Spain)	5–0	(Switzerland) Servette	Santiago Bernabéu Stadium, Madrid
16:30 (CET)	Di Stéfano 29', 61'; Iglesias 44'; Rial 46'; Molowny 54'	Report		Attendance: 40,318; Referee: Riccardo Pieri (Italy)

==== Quarter-finals ====
25 December 1955	Real Madrid (Spain)	4–0	(Socialist Federal Republic of Yugoslavia) Partizan	Santiago Bernabéu Stadium, Madrid
	Castaño 12', 23'; Gento 36'; Di Stéfano 70'	Report		Attendance: 105,532; Referee: Dean Harzic (France)

29 January 1956	Partizan (Socialist Federal Republic of Yugoslavia)	3–0	(Spain) Real Madrid	Partizan Stadium, Belgrade
	Milutinović 24', 87'; Mihajlović 46' (pen.)	Report		Attendance: 40,000; Referee: Josef Gulde (Switzerland)

==== Semi-finals ====
19 April 1956	Real Madrid (Spain)	4–2	(Italy) Milan	Madrid
	Rial 6'; Iglesias 25'; Olsen 40'; Di Stéfano 62'	Report	Nordahl 9'; Schiaffino 30'	Stadium: Santiago Bernabéu Stadium; Attendance: 129,690; Referee: (France) Dean Harzic

1 May 1956	Milan (Italy)	2–1	(Spain) Real Madrid	Milan
	Dal Monte 69' (pen.), 86' (pen.)	Report	Iglesias 65'	Stadium: San Siro; Attendance: 30,000; Referee: (Austria) Erich Steiner

==== Final ====
13 June 1956	Real Madrid (Spain)	4–3	(France) Stade de Reims	Paris
20:30 CET	Di Stéfano 14'; Rial 30', 79'; Marquitos 67'	Report	6' Leblond; 10' Templin; 62' Hidalgo	Stadium: Parc des Princes; Attendance: 38,239; Referee: (England) Arthur Edward Ellis

== Statistics ==
=== Squad statistics ===
competition	points	total						GD
competition	points	G	V	N	P	Gf	Gs	GD
La Liga	38	30	18	2	10	81	39	+42
Copa del Generalísimo	–	6	4	1	1	14	6	+8
European Cup	–	7	5	0	2	14	6	+8
Total		52	36	6	10	113	55	+58

=== Players statistics ===
No.	Pos	Nat	Player	Total		Primera Division		1955–56 European Cup		1956 Copa del Generalisimo	
No.	Pos	Nat	Player	Apps	Goals	Apps	Goals	Apps	Goals	Apps	Goals
	GK	(Spain) ESP	Alonso	36	-51	23	-32	7	-10	6	-9
	DF	(Spain) ESP	Marquitos	37	2	25	1	6	1	6	0
	DF	(Spain) ESP	Navarro	21	0	18	0	3	0	0	0
	DF	(Spain) ESP	Zárraga	40	1	27	0	7	0	6	1
	DF	(Spain) ESP	Lesmes	33	0	21	0	6	0	6	0
	MF	(Spain) ESP	Muñoz	33	1	22	0	7	1	4	0
	MF	(Spain) ESP	Joseíto	20	12	10	5	4	3	6	4
	FW	(Argentina) ARG	Olsen	20	12	15	10	4	1	1	1
	FW	(Argentina) ARG	Rial	38	23	25	15	7	5	6	3
	FW	(Argentina) ARG	Di Stefano	37	29	30	24	7	5	0	0
	FW	(Spain) ESP	Gento	42	11	29	7	7	1	6	3
	GK	(Spain) ESP	Berasaluce	8	-7	7	-7	1	0	0	0
	FW	(Spain) ESP	Marsal	11	8	6	6	1	0	4	2
	DF	(Spain) ESP	Oliva	7	0	6	0	1	0	0	0
	MF	(Spain) ESP	Molowny	8	2	6	1	2	1	0	0
	DF	(Spain) ESP	Atienza	15	0	6	0	3	0	6	0
	MF	(Spain) ESP	Becerril	12	0	10	0	2	0	0	0
	MF	(Spain) ESP	Manolín	12	1	9	1	0	0	3	0
	MF	(Spain) ESP	Pérez Payá	15	10	10	5	0	0	5	5
	FW	(Spain) ESP	Castaño	16	6	13	4	2	2	1	0
	MF	(Spain) ESP	Rubio	6	1	6	1	0	0	0	0
	FW	(Spain) ESP	Mateos	5	1	5	1	0	0	0	0

- Source: http://www.bdfutbol.com/en/t/t1955-562.html
