= 1950–51 Atlético Madrid season =

Atlético Madrid
1950–51 season
- President: Cesáreo Galíndez
- Head coach: Helenio Herrera
- Stadium: Metropolitano
- Primera Division: Winners (In 1950 Latin Cup)
- Copa del Generalísimo: Quarter-finals
- Latin Cup: 3rd place
- Top goalscorer: League: Adrian Escudero (18); All: Adrian Escudero (18)
Home colours	Away colours

The 1950–51 season was Atlético Madrid's 47th season in existence and the club's 14th consecutive season in the top flight of Spanish football.

== Summary ==
Incumbent Champions Atlético Madrid repeat clinching the league after a closed race again with Helenio Herrera as its head coach.

== Squad ==
Note: Flags indicate national team as defined under FIFA eligibility rules; some limited exceptions apply. Players may hold more than one non-FIFA nationality.

No.	Pos.	Nation	Player
-	GK	FRA	Marcel Domingo
-	GK	ESP	Vicente Dauder
-	DF	ESP	Diego Lozano
-	DF	ESP	Rafael Mújica
-	DF	ESP	Rafael García Repullo
-	DF	ESP	Alfonso Aparicio
-	DF	ESP	José Luis Riera
-	DF	ESP	Juan José Mencía
-	MF	ESP	José Hernández González
-	MF	MAR	Larbi Ben Barek

No.	Pos.	Nation	Player
-	MF	ESP	Alfonso Silva
-	MF	ESP	Pedro Mascaró
-	MF	SWE	Henry Carlsson
-	FW	ESP	Adrián Escudero
-	FW	ESP	Salvador Estruch
-	FW	ESP	José Luis Pérez-Payá
-	FW	ESP	José Juncosa
-	FW	ESP	Antonio Durán
-	FW	ESP	Polo
-	FW	ESP	Miguel González Pérez

=== Transfers ===
In
Pos.	Name	from	Type
FW	Jose Luis Perez Paya	Real Sociedad	
GK	Vicente Dauder	Gimnastic	

Out
Pos.	Name	To	Type
DF	Rafael Lesmes	Real Valladolid	loan ended

== Competitions ==
=== Primera División ===
==== League table ====
Pos	Team	Pld	W	D	L	GF	GA	GD	Pts	Qualification or relegation
1	Atlético Madrid (C)	30	17	6	7	87	50	+37	40	Qualification for the Latin Cup
2	Sevilla	30	17	4	9	79	46	+33	38	
3	Valencia	30	17	3	10	64	48	+16	37	
4	Barcelona	30	16	3	11	83	61	+22	35	
5	Real Sociedad	30	15	5	10	77	56	+21	35	

Source: BDFútbol
Rules for classification: 1) Points; 2) Head-to-head results; 3) Goal difference; 4) Number of goals scored
(C) Champions

==== Position by round ====
Round	1	2	3	4	5	6	7	8	9	10	11	12	13	14	15	16	17	18	19	20	21	22	23	24	25	26	27	28	29	30
Ground	H	A	A	H	A	H	A	H	A	H	A	H	A	H	A	A	H	H	A	H	A	H	A	H	A	H	A	H	A	H
Result	L	W	D	D	W	W	W	L	W	W	W	W	W	L	W	W	L	W	W	L	W	L	D	D	W	L	W	W	W	D
Position	14	11	8	10	5	4	2	4	5	4	3	3	1	2	2	1	2	1	1	1	1	1	2	1	1	2	1	2	1	1

Source: www.lfp.es
A = Away; H = Home; W = Win; D = Draw; L = Loss; = Leader, 1951 Latin Cup; = Relegation Group; = 1951-52 Segunda Division

==== Matches ====
10 September 1950 1	Athletic Bilbao	4–0	Atlético Madrid	Bilbao
	Polo 8' (o.g.); Nando 44'; Venancio 77' (pen.); Lozano 85' (o.g.)	Report		Stadium: San Mames; Referee: Barderí Gibert

17 September 1950 2	Atlético Madrid	6–4	CF Barcelona	Madrid
	Escudero 8', 50' (rig.); Mújica 17' (rig.); Durán 27'; Carlsson 48'; Juncosa 88'	Report	3', 78' Aurelio; 53' (rig.), 89' César	Stadium: Metropolitano; Referee: Pérez Rodríguez

24 September 1950 3	Atlético Madrid	2–2	Real Murcia	Madrid
	Carlsson 48' (rig.); Escudero 49'	Report	39', 64' Hériz	Stadium: Metropolitano; Referee: Fombona Fernández

1 October 1950 4	Real Valladolid	3–3	Atlético Madrid	Valladolid
	Coque 18', 20'; Munné 74'	Report	36' Escudero; 38' Mascaró; 40' Pérez-Payá	Stadium: Municipal José Zorrilla; Referee: Gómez Contrera

8 October 1950 5	Atlético Madrid	9–1	Racing Santander	Madrid
	Carlsson 2'; Pérez-Payá 14'; Teruel 21' (aut.); Juncosa 37', 44', 47', 86'; Escudero 67'; Aparicio 89'	Report	23' (pen.) Teruel	Stadium: Metropolitano; Referee: Giménez Molina

15 October 1950 6	Celta	0–2	Atlético Madrid	Vigo
		Report	20' Mújica; 30' Pérez-Payá	Stadium: Balaídos; Referee: Azón Roma

22 October 1950 7	Atlético Madrid	3–0	CD Málaga	Madrid
	Pérez-Payá 62'; Mascaró 62', 65'	Report		Stadium: Metropolitano; Referee: García Fernández

29 October 1950 8	Espanol	4–3	Atlético Madrid	Barcelona
	Marcet 49', 68'; Calvo 53'; Arcas 58'	Report	35' Mújica; 66' Escudero; 72' Juncosa	Stadium: Sarriá; Referee: Jáuregui Ansó

5 November 1950 9	Atlético Madrid	2–2	Real Sociedad	Madrid
	Carlsson 23'; Mújica 38'	Report	45' (pen.) Ontoria; 64' Barinaga	Stadium: Metropolitano; Referee: Arqué Martín

12 November 1950 10	Real Madrid	3–6	Atlético Madrid	Madrid
	Pahiño 19'; Molowny 63'; Makala 72'	Report	4' Carlsson; 12' Mújica; 15', 85' Ben Barek; 25' Pérez-Payá; 74' Escudero	Stadium: Chamartín; Referee: García Fernández

19 November 1950 11	Atlético Madrid	3–2	Valencia	Madrid
	Escudero 60', 76'; Ben Barek 89' (rig.)	Report	4' Badenes; 15' Gago	Stadium: Metropolitano; Referee: Blanco Pérez

26 November 1950 12	UE Lleida	3–4	Atlético Madrid	Lleida
	Bidegain 23'; Di Paola 44'; Alsúa 61'	Report	14', 72', 84' (rig.) Ben Barek; 69' Pérez-Payá	Stadium: Camp d'Esports; Referee: Zariquiegui Izco

3 December 1950 13	Atlético Madrid	5–1	CD Alcoyano	Madrid
	Juncosa 6', 89'; Escudero 15', 67', 76'	Report	54' Olcina	Stadium: Metropolitano; Referee: Gómez Contreras

10 December 1950 14	Deportivo La Coruna	3–0	Atlético Madrid	La Coruna
	Franco 50'; Moll 87'; Oswaldo 89'	Report		Stadium: Riazor; Referee: Pérez Rodríguez

17 December 1950 15	Atlético Madrid	2–1	Sevilla FC	Madrid
	Ben Barek 18'; Escudero 25'	Report	38' Arza	Stadium: Metropolitano; Referee: Aurre Larrea

31 December 1950 16	Atlético Madrid	2–0	Athletic Bilbao	Madrid
	Pérez-Payá 18'; Juncosa 39'	Report		Stadium: Metropolitano; Referee: Trapote López

7 January 1951 17	CF Barcelona	3–0	Atlético Madrid	Barcelona
	César 47'; Basora 54', 79'	Report		Stadium: Les Corts; Referee: Jáuregui Ansó

14 January 1951 18	Real Murcia	1–3	Atlético Madrid	Murcia
	Del Toro 15'	Report	6', 55' Carlsson; 20' Pérez-Payá	Stadium: La Condomina; Referee: Azón Roma

21 January 1951 19	Atlético Madrid	7–0	Real Valladolid	Madrid
	Juncosa 8', 42', 47'; Escudero 21'; Carlsson 44', 81'; Ben Barek 55'	Report		Stadium: Metropolitano; Referee: Fombona Fernández

28 January 1951 20	Racing Santander	1–0	Atlético Madrid	Santander
	Joseíto 65'	Report		Stadium: El Sardinero; Referee: Jáuregui Ansó

4 February 1951 21	Atlético Madrid	3–2	Celta	Madrid
	Pérez-Payá 7'; Escudero 52', 70'	Report	61' Atienza; 84' Juanín	Stadium: Metropolitano; Referee: Fombona Fernández

25 February 1951 22	CD Málaga	2–1	Atlético Madrid	Málaga
	Bazán 50'; Torres 52'	Report	84' Tinte	Stadium: La Rosaleda; Referee: Azón Roma

4 March 1951 23	Atlético Madrid	1–1	Espanol	Madrid
	Ben Barek 6'	Report	49' Marcet	Stadium: Metropolitano; Referee: Rivero Lecuona

11 March 1951 24	Real Sociedad	1–1	Atlético Madrid	San Sebastián
	Caeiro 59'	Report	55' Escudero	Stadium: Atocha; Referee: Mazagatos Vicario

18 March 1951 25	Atlético Madrid	4–0	Real Madrid	Madrid
	Pérez-Payá 12', 89'; Luciano 22' (aut.); Tinte 78'	Report		Stadium: Metropolitano; Referee: Arqué Martín

25 March 1951 26	Valencia CF	1–0	Atlético Madrid	Valencia
	Badenes 75'	Report		Stadium: Mestalla; Referee: Rivero Lecuona

1 April 1951 27	Atlético Madrid	7–1	UE Lleida	Madrid
	Estruch 16'; Ben Barek 18' (rig.); Carlsson 26', 76'; Cerveró 58' (aut.); Escudero 85'; Pérez-Payá 86'	Report	11' Alsúa	Stadium: Metropolitano; Referee: Bienzobas Ocariz

8 April 1951 28	CD Alcoyano	1–2	Atlético Madrid	Alcoy
	Olcina 57'	Report	7' Ben Barek; 53' Escudero	Stadium: El Collao; Referee: Giménez Molina

15 April 1951 29	Atlético Madrid	5–2	Deportivo La Coruna	Madrid
	Ben Barek 3', 68'; Pérez-Payá 38', 86'; Silva 72'	Report	56' (pen.) Cuenca; 74' Oswaldo	Stadium: Metropolitano; Referee: Barderí Gibert

22 April 1951 30	Sevilla FC	1–1	Atlético Madrid	Seville
	Doménech 20'	Report	43' Ben Barek	Stadium: Nervión; Referee: Azón Roma

=== Copa del Generalísimo ===
==== Eightfinals ====
29 April 1951 1	Real Valladolid	4–3	Atlético Madrid	Valladolid
	Pepín 2'; Lolo 60', 62', 77'	Report	18', 74' Juncosa; 23' Pérez-Payá	Stadium: Municipal José Zorrilla; Referee: Barderí Gibert

3 May 1951 2	Atlético Madrid	4–0	Real Valladolid	Madrid
	Estruch 9'; Mújica 14', 86'; Carlsson 77'	Report		Stadium: Metropolitano; Referee: Bienzobas Ocariz

==== Quarterfinals ====
6 May 1951 1	Atlético Madrid	0–1	Real Madrid	Madrid
		Report	69' Imbelloni	Stadium: Metropolitano; Referee: Zariquiegui Izco

10 May 1951 2	Real Madrid	1–1	Atlético Madrid	Madrid
	Pahiño 52'	Report	64' Juncosa	Stadium: Chamartín; Referee: Giménez Molina

=== Latin Cup ===
20 June 1951 Semifinals	Milan (Italy)	4–1	(Spain) Atlético Madrid	Milan
?	Renosto 18', 53', 74'; Nordahl 22'	Report	70' Carlsson	Stadium: San Siro; Attendance: 10,000; Referee: (France) Boes

24 June 1951 Third place	Atlético Madrid (Spain)	3–1	(Portugal) Sporting Lisbon	Milan
	Carlsson 13'; Mascaró 72'; Pérez-Payá 89'	Report	8' Travassos	Stadium: San Siro; Referee: (Italy) Giuseppe Carpani

== Statistics ==
=== Players statistics ===
No.	Pos	Nat	Player	Total		Primera Division		Copa del Generalisimo		Latin Cup	
No.	Pos	Nat	Player	Apps	Goals	Apps	Goals	Apps	Goals	Apps	Goals
-	GK	(France) FRA	Marcel Domingo	34	-57	29	-47	4	-6	1	-4
-	DF	(Spain) ESP	Diego Lozano	27	0	21	0	4	0	2	0
-	DF	(Spain) ESP	Rafael Mújica	26	7	20	5	4	2	2	0
-	DF	(Spain) ESP	Rafael García Repullo	29	2	24	2	4	0	1	0
-	DF	(Spain) ESP	Alfonso Aparicio	23	1	18	1	4	0	1	0
-	MF	(Morocco) MAR	Larbi Ben Barek	25	14	22	14	3	0		
-	MF	(Spain) ESP	Alfonso Silva	24	1	20	1	2	0	2	0
-	MF	(Sweden) SWE	Henry Carlsson	32	15	26	12	4	1	2	2
-	FW	(Spain) ESP	Adrián Escudero	35	18	30	18	3	0	2	0
-	FW	(Spain) ESP	José Luis Pérez-Payá	32	16	26	14	4	1	2	1
-	FW	(Spain) ESP	José Juncosa	24	15	19	12	4	3	1	0
-	GK	(Spain) ESP	Vicente Dauder	2	-4	1	-3	0	0	1	-1
-	MF	(Spain) ESP	José Hernández González	18	0	14	0	3	0	1	0
-	FW	(Spain) ESP	Salvador Estruch	13	2	11	1	1	1	1	0
-	DF	(Spain) ESP	José Luis Riera	11	0	11	0				
-	DF	(Spain) ESP	Juan José Mencía	11	0	10	0	0	0	1	0
-	MF	(Spain) ESP	Pedro Mascaró	12	4	10	3	0	0	2	1
-	FW	(Spain) ESP	Manuel Santana	9	0	9	0				
-	FW	(Spain) ESP	Antonio Durán	3	1	3	1				
-	FW	(Spain) ESP	Pío Alonso	2	0	2	0				
-	FW	(Spain) ESP	Ramón Cobo	2	0	2	0				
-	FW	(Spain) ESP	Francisco Rodríguez	1	0	1	0				
-	FW	(Spain) ESP	Miguel González Pérez	1	0	1	0				
-	FW	(Spain) ESP	Polo								

- Source: https://www.bdfutbol.com/en/t/t1949-507.html
