= José Luis Pérez-Payá =

Spanish footballer (1928–2022)

Personal information
- Full name: José Luis Pérez-Payá Soler
- Date of birth: 2 March 1928
- Place of birth: Alcoy, Alicante, Spain
- Date of death: 12 August 2022 (aged 94)
- Place of death: Madrid, Spain
- Height: 1.81 m (5 ft 11 in)
- Position: Forward

Youth career
- 1946–1948: Deusto

Senior career*
Years	Team	Apps	(Gls)
1948–1949	Barakaldo	11	(6)
1949–1950	Alcoyano	17	(12)
1950	Real Sociedad	7	(5)
1950–1953	Atlético Madrid	65	(30)
1953–1957	Real Madrid	36	(13)
Total		136	(66)

International career
1955	Spain	2	(0)
- * Club domestic league appearances and goals

José Luis Pérez-Payá Soler (2 March 1928 – 12 August 2022), was a Spanish footballer who played as a forward. He was also president of the Royal Spanish Football Federation from 1970 until 1975. He is one of only 2 footballers to have won the Spanish League Title with both Madrid clubs - Atlético de Madrid in 1950–51; Real Madrid in 1953–54 and 1954–55.

Payá died on 12 August 2022, at the age of 94.

== Career statistics ==
=== Club ===
Appearances and goals by club, season and competition
Club	Season	League			Cup		Continental		Other		Total	
Club	Season	Division	Apps	Goals	Apps	Goals	Apps	Goals	Apps	Goals	Apps	Goals
Barakaldo	1948–49	Segunda División	11	6	1	0	–		0	0	12	6
Alcoyano	1949–50	Segunda División	17	12	2	2	–		0	0	19	14
Real Sociedad	1949–50	La Liga	7	5	0	0	0	0	0	0	7	5
Atlético Madrid	1950–51	La Liga	26	14	4	1	2 (Note: Appearances in the Latin Cup)	1	2 (Note: Appearances in the Copa Eva Duarte)	3	34	19
Atlético Madrid	1951–52	La Liga	28	14	2	1	0	0	1	0	31	15
Atlético Madrid	1952–53	La Liga	11	2	5	0	0	0	0	0	16	2
Atlético Madrid	Total		65	30	11	2	2	1	3	3	81	36
Real Madrid	1953–54	La Liga	10	2	3	1	0	0	0	0	13	3
Real Madrid	1954–55	La Liga	16	6	3	4	2	1	0	0	21	11
Real Madrid	1955–56	La Liga	10	5	5	5	1 (Note: Appearances in the European Cup)	0	0	0	16	10
Real Madrid	1956–57	La Liga	0	0	0	0	0	0	0	0	0	0
Real Madrid	Total		36	13	11	10	3	1	0	0	50	24
Career total			129	0	9	0	7	0	0	0	145	0

(https://elcierredigital.com/pizarra-deportiva/fallece-perez-paya-jugador-del-real-madrid-y-atletico-y-expresidente-rfef)

Sporting positions
Preceded by José Luis Costa	President of the Royal Spanish Football Federation; 1970–1975	Succeeded by Pablo Porta
