= 1957 Latin Cup =

1957 club football tournament

Copa Latina de 1957

Tournament details
- Host country: Spain
- Dates: 20–23 June 1957
- Teams: 4 (from 1 confederation)
- Venue: 1 (in 1 host city)

Final positions
- Champions: Real Madrid (2nd title)
- Runners-up: Benfica
- Third place: Milan
- Fourth place: Saint-Étienne

Tournament statistics
- Matches played: 4
- Goals scored: 15 (3.75 per match)
- Attendance: 340,000 (85,000 per match)
- Top scorers: (Spain) Paco Gento; (3 goals)

The 1957 Latin Cup (Spanish: Copa Latina de 1957) was the eighth and final edition of the annual Latin Cup. It was contested by the domestic league champions the Southwest European nations of France, Italy, Portugal, and Spain. The clubs which competed in the tournament were Saint-Étienne, Milan, Benfica, and Real Madrid.

The four-match knockout tournament, was hosted in Madrid, Spain at the Santiago Bernabéu Stadium. In the semifinals on 20 June, SL Benfica defeated AS Saint-Étienne by a score of 1–0, and Real Madrid CF defeated AC Milan by a score of 5–1. The third place match was held on 23 June, where AC Milan defeated AS Saint-Étienne 4–3. The final, which was held on the same day, saw Real Madrid CF claim its second Latin Cup title in a 1–0 victory. A total of 15 goals were scored in the tournament, and Real Madrid's Paco Gento was the top goalscorer with 3 goals, all of which were scored against AC Milan in the semifinals.

Real Madrid had won the 1956–57 European Cup less than one month before the 1957 Latin Cup and became one of only three teams, together with FC Barcelona and AC Milan, to win the Latin Cup on two occasions. Additionally, the country of Spain was awarded a trophy for its overall success in the prior four Latin Cups.

== Participating teams ==
The Latin Cup was an international club tournament which was contested by the domestic league champions of France, Italy, Portugal, and Spain. The tournament served as a regional championship for Southwestern Europe, similar to the Mitropa Cup for Central Europe and Balkans Cup for the Balkans, prior to the establishment of the European Cup. The following league champions qualified for the 1957 Latin Cup:

Team	Method of qualification	Previous appearances
Saint-Étienne	1956–57 French Division 1 champions	Debut
Milan (defending champions)	1956–57 Serie A champions	1951, 1953, 1955, 1956
Benfica	1956–57 Primeira Divisão champions	1950, 1956
Real Madrid	1956–57 La Liga champions	1955

== Venues ==
The host of the tournament was Spain and all matches were played at the Santiago Bernabéu Stadium in Madrid.

Madrid	1957 Latin Cup is located in Spain
Santiago Bernabéu Stadium	1957 Latin Cup is located in Spain
40°27′11″N 3°41′18″W	1957 Latin Cup is located in Spain
Capacity: 75,000	1957 Latin Cup is located in Spain
The Santiago Bernabéu Stadium in 1955.	1957 Latin Cup is located in Spain

== Tournament ==
=== Semifinals ===
Lots were drawn to determine the semifinal matches of the 1957 Latin Cup, and both semifinal matches were held on 20 June. The first match was Benfica versus Saint-Étienne. The match was refereed by Daniel Zariquiegui Izco of the Spanish Football Federation and resulted in a 1–0 victory for Benfica; Portuguese midfielder Francisco Calado scored the match's lone goal.

The second match was Real Madrid versus Milan. Not only were both clubs champions of their respective domestic leagues, but Milan was the Latin Cup's defending champion and Real Madrid had just won its second consecutive European Cup title in Madrid on 30 May 1957. The match refereed by Marcel Lequesne of the French Football Federation and resulted in a 5–1 victory for Real Madrid. Spanish forward Paco Gento scored the tournament's only hat-trick during the match, scoring three goals.

20 June 1957
19:30 UTC+1

Benfica	1–0	Saint-Étienne
Calado 17'

Santiago Bernabéu Stadium, Madrid, Spain
Attendance: 80,000
Referee: Daniel Zariquiegui Izco (Spain)

Benfica	Saint-Étienne

GK	(Portugal) José de Bastos
DF	(Portugal) Ângelo Martins
DF	(Portugal) Manuel Francisco Serra
MF	(Portugal) Zézinho
MF	(Portugal) Alfredo Abrantes
MF	(Portugal) Mário Coluna
MF	(Portugal) Fernando Caiado
MF	(Portugal) Francisco Calado (c)
FW	(Portugal) Domiciano Cavém
FW	(Portugal) Francisco Palmeiro
FW	(Portugal) José Águas
Manager:
(Brazil) Otto Glória

GK	(France) Claude Abbes
DF	(France) Michel Tylinski
DF	(France) François Wicart
MF	(France) René Domingo
MF	(France) René Ferrier
MF	(France) Yvon Goujon
MF	(Algeria) Rachid Mekhloufi
MF	(France) Jean Oleksiak
FW	(France) Georges Peyroche
FW	(France) Armand Fouillen
FW	(Cameroon) Eugène N'Jo Léa
Manager:
(France) Jean Snella

20 June 1957
21:30 UTC+1

Real Madrid	5–1	Milan
Gento 20', 47', 85'; Di Stéfano 50'; Joseíto 83'		Cucchiaroni 30'

Santiago Bernabéu Stadium, Madrid, Spain
Attendance: 80,000
Referee: Marcel Lequesne (France)

Real Madrid	Milan

GK	(Spain) Juan Alonso (c)
DF	(Spain) Marquitos
DF	(Spain) Rafael Lesmes
DF	(Spain) Manuel Torres Pastor
MF	(Spain) Miguel Muñoz
MF	(Spain) Antonio Ruiz Cervilla
MF	(Spain) Joseíto
FW	(Spain) Héctor Rial
FW	(Spain) Paco Gento
FW	(Spain) Alfredo Di Stéfano
FW	(France) Raymond Kopa
Manager:
(Spain) José Villalonga

GK	(Italy) Lorenzo Buffon
DF	(Italy) Cesare Maldini
DF	(Italy) Luigi Radice
MF	(Italy) Eros Beraldo
MF	(Sweden) Nils Liedholm (c)
MF	(Italy) Luigi Zannier
MF	(Italy) Alfio Fontana
FW	(Italy) Amos Mariani
FW	(Argentina) Eduardo Ricagni
FW	(Norway) Per Bredesen
FW	(Argentina) Ernesto Cucchiaroni
Manager:
(Italy) Giuseppe Viani

=== Third place match ===
Milan and Saint-Étienne faced each other in the third place match on 23 June. The match was refereed by Joaquim Fernandes de Campos of the Portuguese Football Federation. Saint-Étienne took an early lead with a 9th minute goal from François Wicart, however, consecutive goals from Milan in the 18th minute by Eduardo Ricagni, the 42nd minute by Amos Mariani, and the 70th minute by Nils Liedholm helped give Milan a 3–1 lead. Saint-Étienne responded with goals from Rachid Mekhloufi in the 78th minute and Eugène N'Jo Léa in the 80th minute to level the match at 3–3, but a goal from Nils Liedholm in the 88th minute allowed Milan to defeat Saint-Étienne by a final score of 4–3.

23 June 1957
19:30 UTC+1

Milan	4–3	Saint-Étienne
Ricagni 18'; Mariani 42'; Bredesen 70'; Liedholm 88'		Wicart 9'; Mekhloufi 78'; N'Jo Léa 80'

Santiago Bernabéu Stadium, Madrid, Spain
Attendance: 90,000
Referee: Joaquim Campos (Portugal)

Milan	Saint-Étienne

GK	(Italy) Lorenzo Buffon
DF	(Italy) Cesare Maldini
DF	(Italy) Luigi Radice
MF	(Italy) Eros Beraldo
MF	(Sweden) Nils Liedholm (c)
MF	(Italy) Luigi Zannier
MF	(Italy) Alfio Fontana
FW	(Italy) Amos Mariani
FW	(Argentina) Eduardo Ricagni
FW	(Norway) Per Bredesen
FW	(Argentina) Ernesto Cucchiaroni
Manager:
(Italy) Giuseppe Viani

GK	(France) Claude Abbes
DF	(France) Michel Tylinski
DF	(France) François Wicart
MF	(France) René Domingo
MF	(France) René Ferrier
MF	(France) Yvon Goujon
MF	(Algeria) Rachid Mekhloufi
MF	(France) Jean Oleksiak
FW	(France) Georges Peyroche
FW	(France) Armand Fouillen
FW	(Cameroon) Eugène N'Jo Léa
Manager:
(France) Jean Snella

=== Final ===
The final match was contested by Real Madrid and Benfica on 23 June 1957; Lequesne was the match's referee. Both clubs had previously won the tournament, as Benfica defeated FC Girondins de Bordeaux in 1950 and Real Madrid defeated Stade de Reims in 1955. During the final, Spanish forward Alfredo Di Stéfano scored the match's lone goal at the 50th minute for Real Madrid in a 1–0 victory. Additionally, Portuguese midfielder Zézinho received the only red card of the tournament during the match in the 54th minute. The 1957 Latin Cup was Real Madrid's second Latin Cup title, and Real Madrid was the Latin Cup's last ever champion.

23 June 1957
21:30 UTC+1

Real Madrid	1–0	Benfica
Di Stéfano 50'

Santiago Bernabéu Stadium, Madrid, Spain
Attendance: 90,000
Referee: Marcel Lequesne (France)

Real Madrid	Benfica

GK	(Spain) Juan Alonso
DF	(Spain) Marquitos
DF	(Spain) Rafael Lesmes
DF	(Spain) Manuel Torres Pastor
MF	(Spain) Miguel Muñoz (c)
MF	(Spain) Antonio Ruiz Cervilla
MF	(Spain) Joseíto
FW	(Spain) Héctor Rial
FW	(Spain) Paco Gento
FW	(Spain) Alfredo Di Stéfano
FW	(France) Raymond Kopa
Manager:
(Spain) José Villalonga

GK	(Portugal) José de Bastos
DF	(Portugal) Ângelo Martins
DF	(Portugal) Manuel Francisco Serra
MF	(Portugal) Zézinho	(red card) 54'
MF	(Portugal) Alfredo Abrantes
MF	(Portugal) Mário Coluna
MF	(Portugal) Fernando Caiado (c)
MF	(Portugal) Francisco Calado
FW	(Portugal) Domiciano Cavém
FW	(Portugal) Francisco Palmeiro
FW	(Portugal) José Águas
Manager:
(Brazil) Otto Glória

1957 Latin Cup Champions
(Francoist Spain)
Real Madrid
2nd title

== Bracket ==
Semifinals
20 June – Madrid
Real Madrid	5
Milan	1
20 June – Madrid
Benfica	1
Saint-Étienne	0

Final
23 June – Madrid
Real Madrid	1
Benfica	0
Third place match
23 June – Madrid
Milan	4
Saint-Étienne	3

== Statistics ==
=== Goalscorers ===
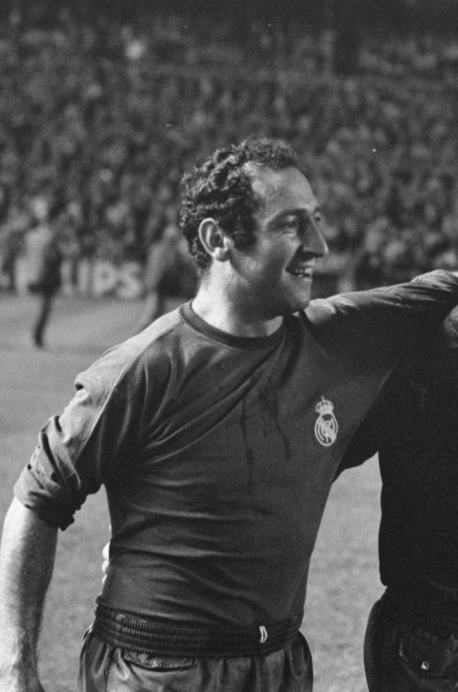
Paco Gento was the leading goalscorer, scoring 3 goals in a hat-trick against Milan in the semifinals.

A total of 15 goals were scored during the tournament: 6 by Real Madrid, 5 by Milan, 3 by Saint-Étienne, and 1 by Benfica. Gento was the tournament's top scorer, scoring 3 goals in a hat-trick against Milan in the semifinals. Di Stéfano scored the tournament's final goal—the lone goal in the final match against Benfica.

Rank	Player	Team	Goals
1	(Spain) Paco Gento	(Spain) Real Madrid	3
2	(Spain) Alfredo Di Stéfano	(Spain) Real Madrid	2
3	(Spain) Joseíto	(Spain) Real Madrid	1
3	(France) François Wicart	(France) Saint-Étienne	1
3	(Algeria) Rachid Mekhloufi	(France) Saint-Étienne	1
3	(Cameroon) Eugène N'Jo Léa	(France) Saint-Étienne	1
3	(Italy) Eduardo Ricagni	(Italy) Milan	1
3	(Italy) Amos Mariani	(Italy) Milan	1
3	(Argentina) Ernesto Cucchiaroni	(Italy) Milan	1
3	(Norway) Per Bredesen	(Italy) Milan	1
3	(Sweden) Nils Liedholm	(Italy) Milan	1
3	(Portugal) Francisco Calado	(Portugal) Benfica	1

== Aftermath ==
The 1957 Latin Cup was the final edition of the tournament ever hosted. As happened in 1954, the 1958 edition of the tournament was canceled due to the conflicting schedule of the 1958 FIFA World Cup. Due to the rising popularity of the European Cup, however, the tournament was not hosted again. After the tournament, the four nations which participated in the 1953, 1955, 1956, and 1957 editions of the tournament were allocated points based on their clubs' performances. Spain, which won the 1955 and 1957 editions, was awarded a trophy for topping the other three nations in point totals.

R	Nation	1st	2nd	3rd	4th	Pts.
1.	Spain	2	1	–	1	12
2.	Italy	1	1	2	–	11
3.	France	1	1	–	2	9
4.	Portugal	–	1	2	1	8

== See also ==
- 1957 Mitropa Cup, a similar competition
