= Manuel Torres (footballer, born 1930) =

Spanish footballer

Manuel Torres Pastor (19 April 1930 – 14 March 2014) was a Spanish professional association football player.

Manuel was born in Teruel, Spain. He spent his career as a defender for Real Zaragoza. In 1957 he joined Real Madrid on a loan deal.

== Honours ==
Real Madrid

- European Cup: 1956–57
- Spanish League: 1956–57
- Latin Cup: 1957

== Club career ==
Club	Country	Period	App.	gl.
Real Zaragoza	Spain	1956–1961	100	0
Real Madrid C.F.	Spain	1957	5	0
