= 1955 Latin Cup =

1955 club football tournament

Coupe Latine 1955

Tournament details
- Host country: France
- Dates: 22–26 June 1955
- Teams: 4 (from 1 confederation)
- Venue: 1 (in 1 host city)

Final positions
- Champions: Real Madrid (1st title)
- Runners-up: Reims
- Third place: A.C. Milan
- Fourth place: Belenenses

Tournament statistics
- Matches played: 4
- Goals scored: 13 (3.25 per match)
- Top scorers: (Spain) Héctor Rial; (France) Léon Glovacki; (Italy) Eduardo Ricagni; (2 goals each)

The 1955 Latin Cup (French: Coupe Latine 1955) was the sixth edition of the annual Latin Cup which was played by clubs of the Southwest European nations of France, Italy, Portugal, and Spain. The tournament was hosted by France, and the Spanish club Real Madrid was the winner of the tournament after defeating Reims by a score of 2–0 in the final match.

== Participating teams ==
Team	Method of qualification	Previous appearances
Reims	1954–55 French Division 1 champions	1949, 1953
A.C. Milan	1954–55 Serie A champions	1951, 1953
Belenenses	1954–55 Primeira Divisão runners-up (Note: SL Benfica declined participation in the tournament.)	Debut
Real Madrid	1954–55 La Liga champions	Debut

== Venues ==
The host of the tournament was France, and all matches were played in one host stadium.

Paris	1955 Latin Cup is located in France
Parc des Princes	1955 Latin Cup is located in France
Capacity: 38,000	1955 Latin Cup is located in France
Parc des Princes	1955 Latin Cup is located in France

== Tournament ==
=== Bracket ===
Semifinals
22 June – Paris
Real Madrid	2
Belenenses	0
22 June – Paris
Reims	3
A.C. Milan	2

Final
26 June – Paris
Real Madrid	2
Reims	0
Third place match
25 June – Paris
A.C. Milan	3
Belenenses	1

=== Semifinals ===
22 June 1955

Real Madrid	2–0	Belenenses
Zárraga 14'; Payá 60'

Parc des Princes, Paris, France
Referee: Vincenzo Orlandini (Italy)

22 June 1955

Reims	3–2 (a.e.t.)	A.C. Milan
Glovacki 45', 138'; Templin 100'		Sørensen 26'; Liedholm 115'

Parc des Princes, Paris, France
Referee: José Vieira da Costa (Portugal)

=== Third place match ===
25 June 1955

A.C. Milan	3–1	Belenenses
Ricagni 16', 73'; Nordahl 83'		Matateu 81'

Parc des Princes, Paris, France
Referee: Juan Gardeazabal Garay (Spain)

=== Final ===
26 June 1955

Real Madrid	2–0	Reims
Rial 6', 73'

Parc des Princes, Paris, France
Referee: Fernandes Joaquim Campos (Portugal)

Real Madrid	Reims

GK	1	(Spain) Juan Alonso
DF	2	(Spain) Ángel Atienza
DF	3	(Spain) Joaquín Oliva
DF	4	(Spain) Joaquín Navarro
MF	5	(Spain) Miguel Muñoz (c)
MF	6	(Spain) José María Zárraga
FW	7	(Spain) Héctor Rial
FW	8	(Spain) Pérez Payá
FW	9	(Argentina) Alfredo Di Stéfano
FW	10	(Spain) Luis Molowny
FW	11	(Spain) Francisco Gento
Manager:
(Spain) José Villalonga

GK	1	(France) Paul Sinibaldi
DF	2	(France) Simon Zimny
DF	3	(France) Robert Jonquet (c)
DF	4	(France) Raoul Giraudo
MF	5	(France) Armand Penverne
MF	6	(France) Robert Siatka
FW	7	(France) Michel Hidalgo
FW	8	(France) Léon Glovacki
FW	9	(France) Raymond Kopa
FW	10	(France) René Bliard
FW	11	(France) Jean Templin
Manager:
(France) Albert Batteux

1955 Latin Cup Champions
(Francoist Spain)
Real Madrid
1st title

== Goalscorers ==
Rank	Player	Team	Goals
1	(Spain) Héctor Rial	(Spain) Real Madrid	2
1	(France) Léon Glovacki	(France) Reims	2
1	(Italy) Eduardo Ricagni	(Italy) A.C. Milan	2
2	(Denmark) Jørgen Leschly Sørensen	(Italy) A.C. Milan	1
2	(Sweden) Nils Liedholm	(Italy) A.C. Milan	1
2	(Sweden) Gunnar Nordahl	(Italy) A.C. Milan	1
2	(France) Jean Templin	(France) Reims	1
2	(Portugal) Matateu	(Portugal) Belenenses	1
2	(Spain) José María Zárraga	(Spain) Real Madrid	1
2	(Spain) Pérez Payá	(Spain) Real Madrid	1

== See also ==
- 1955 Mitropa Cup, a similar competition
