= Joseíto =

Spanish footballer and manager (1926–2007)

Personal information
- Full name: José Iglesias Fernández
- Date of birth: 23 December 1926
- Place of birth: Zamora, Spain
- Date of death: 12 July 2007 (aged 80)
- Place of death: Granada, Spain
- Position: Outside right

Youth career
- Los Luises

Senior career*
Years	Team	Apps	(Gls)
1943–1944	Atlético Zamora		
1944–1947	Valladolid		
1947–1949	Salamanca		
1949–1951	Real Santander		
1951–1959	Real Madrid	124	(51)
1959–1960	Levante		
1960–1961	Rayo Vallecano		

International career
1952	Spain	1	(0)

Managerial career
- 1963–1965: Celta
- 1965–1966: Tenerife
- 1968–1969: Valencia
- 1970–1972: Granada
- 1972–1973: Córdoba
- 1973–1975: Granada
- 1976: Murcia
- 1976–1978: Alavés
- 1978–1979: Tarrasa
- 1979-1980: Leganés
- 1980: Deportivo La Coruña
- 1981–1982: Tenerife
- * Club domestic league appearances and goals

José Iglesias Fernández (23 December 1926 – 12 July 2007), nicknamed Joseíto, was a Spanish football outside right and manager.

He amassed La Liga totals of 134 games and 54 goals over the course of nine seasons, namely in representation of Real Madrid, with which he appeared in 177 official matches and scored 77 goals, winning ten major titles.

== Club career ==
Born in Zamora, Castile and León, Joseíto played for several clubs before arriving at Real Santander SD in 1949, including local CA Zamora. In his first season, he helped the Cantabrians promote to La Liga.

In the 1951 summer Joseíto moved to Real Madrid (two years before another player that would represent both clubs, Francisco Gento), going on to remain at the Santiago Bernabéu Stadium for the following eight years whilst appearing in nearly 200 official games. From 1955 to 1959 he won four consecutive European Cups, contributing with 11 matches and six goals in the process; however, after the arrival of Raymond Kopa, he began featuring less regularly.

Joseíto retired in 1961 at the age of nearly 35, after one-year spells in the second division with Levante UD and Rayo Vallecano. In the following decades he managed a host of clubs in all three major levels of Spanish football, being in charge of Valencia CF and Granada CF (two spells) in the top level.

== International career ==
Joseíto gained his first and only cap for Spain on 28 December 1952, a 2–2 friendly draw with West Germany played in Madrid.

== Honours ==
Valladolid

- Tercera División: 1945–46, 1946–47

Salamanca

- Tercera División: 1947–48

Racing Santander

- Segunda División: 1949–50

Real Madrid

- La Liga: 1953–54, 1954–55, 1956–57, 1957–58
- European Cup: 1955–56, 1956–57, 1957–58, 1958–59
- Latin Cup: 1955, 1957

== Death ==
Joseíto died in Granada, Andalusia on 12 July 2007, after suffering the second stroke in six years. He was 80 years old.
