= José María Zárraga =

Spanish footballer (1930–2012)

Personal information
- Full name: José María Zárraga Martín
- Date of birth: 15 August 1930
- Place of birth: Las Arenas, Spain
- Date of death: 3 April 2012 (aged 81)
- Place of death: Madrid, Spain
- Height: 1.79 m (5 ft 10 in)
- Position: Midfielder

Youth career
- Ibarra
- University of Deusto

Senior career*
Years	Team	Apps	(Gls)
1948–1949	Arenas	?	(?)
1949–1951	Plus Ultra	26	(4)
1951–1962	Real Madrid	217	(5)

International career
1953–1955	Spain B	2	(0)
1955–1958	Spain	8	(0)

Managerial career
- 1964: Málaga
- 1965: Murcia
- 1969: Málaga
- * Club domestic league appearances and goals

José María Zárraga Martín (15 August 1930 – 3 April 2012) was a Spanish professional footballer who played as a midfielder.

== Club career ==
Born in Las Arenas, Biscay, Zárraga signed for Real Madrid in 1949, spending the following two seasons with the reserve team. He made his La Liga debut on 14 October 1951 in a 3–1 home win against Valencia CF, finishing his first two years with the club with 48 games and two goals combined but failing to collect any silverware.

From 1953 to 1960, Zárraga was an important midfield unit as the Merengues won 11 major titles, including five consecutive European Cups (that record would only be bettered by Francisco Gento, who won six) – he played in all the finals, and totaled 31 appearances combined in those victorious campaigns.

Zárraga continued to add to his trophy cabinet in his final two seasons with Real (notably back-to-back national championships), but only played in five matches combined. He retired in June 1962 at nearly 32, having appeared in 306 official games, and went on to have brief coaching spells in the decade, including six matches with CD Málaga in 1968–69 (after replacing Brazilian Otto Bumbel), which ended in top flight relegation; he also worked as a director of football with Valencia and Deportivo Alavés.

== International career ==
Zárraga won eight caps in the Spain national team, his debut coming in 1955 in a 1–1 draw with England at the Chamartín. In his last international appearances, Zárraga played as captain.

== Style of play ==
A midfielder, Zárraga was known for his strength and bravery on the pitch.

== Death ==
Zárraga suffered a stroke in early October 1993, having to be admitted to the Zarzuela Clinic in Madrid. On 3 April 2012, he died at the age of 81, also in the Spanish capital.

== Honours ==
Real Madrid

- La Liga: 1953–54, 1954–55, 1956–57, 1957–58, 1960–61, 1961–62
- Copa del Generalísimo: 1961–62
- European Cup: 1955–56, 1956–57, 1957–58, 1958–59, 1959–60
- Intercontinental Cup: 1960
- Latin Cup: 1955
- Small Club World Cup: 1952, 1956
