= 1953–54 La Liga =

23rd season of La Liga

Primera División
- Season: 1953–54
- Champions: Real Madrid (3rd title)
- Relegated: Osasuna; Jaén; Oviedo; Real Gijón
- Matches: 240
- Goals: 844 (3.52 per match)
- Top goalscorer: Alfredo Di Stéfano (27 goals)
- Biggest home win: Barcelona 9–0 Oviedo
- Biggest away win: Oviedo 0–4 Real Madrid
- Highest scoring: Real Sociedad 3–6 Real Madrid; Barcelona 9–0 Oviedo
- Longest winning run: 5 matches Real Madrid
- Longest unbeaten run: 7 matches Barcelona; Atlético Madrid
- Longest winless run: 12 matches Real Gijón
- Longest losing run: 10 matches Real Gijón

The 1953–54 La Liga was the 23rd season since its establishment. Real Madrid conquered their third title, 21 years after their last one.

== Team locations ==
Location of teams in 1953–54 La Liga

Club	City	Stadium
Atlético Bilbao	Bilbao	San Mamés
Atlético Madrid	Madrid	Metropolitano
Barcelona	Barcelona	Les Corts
Celta	Vigo	Balaídos
Deportivo La Coruña	A Coruña	Riazor
Español	Barcelona	Sarriá
Jaén	Jaén	La Victoria
Osasuna	Pamplona	San Juan
Oviedo	Oviedo	Buenavista
Real Gijón	Gijón	El Molinón
Real Madrid	Madrid	Chamartín
Real Santander	Santander	El Sardinero
Real Sociedad	San Sebastián	Atotxa
Sevilla	Seville	Nervión
Valencia	Valencia	Mestalla
Valladolid	Valladolid	José Zorrilla

== League table ==
Pos	Team	Pld	W	D	L	GF	GA	GD	Pts	Qualification or relegation
1	Real Madrid (C)	30	17	6	7	72	41	+31	40	
2	Barcelona	30	16	4	10	74	39	+35	36	
3	Valencia	30	14	6	10	69	51	+18	34	
4	Español	30	14	6	10	50	36	+14	34	
5	Sevilla	30	15	2	13	57	49	+8	32	
6	Atlético Bilbao	30	12	8	10	54	44	+10	32	
7	Deportivo La Coruña	30	13	5	12	41	46	−5	31	
8	Real Santander	30	12	7	11	53	61	−8	31	
9	Real Sociedad	30	11	7	12	44	58	−14	29	
10	Celta Vigo	30	12	5	13	47	54	−7	29	
11	Atlético Madrid	30	11	7	12	57	47	+10	29	
12	Valladolid	30	12	5	13	50	60	−10	29	
13	Osasuna (R)	30	12	4	14	46	54	−8	28	Qualification to the relegation group
14	Jaén (R)	30	11	6	13	55	70	−15	28	Qualification to the relegation group
15	Oviedo (R)	30	8	6	16	31	53	−22	22	Relegation to the Segunda División
16	Real Gijón (R)	30	7	2	21	44	81	−37	16	Relegation to the Segunda División

Source: BDFútbol
Rules for classification: 1) Points; 2) Head-to-head results; 3) Goal difference; 4) Number of goals scored
(C) Champions; (R) Relegated

== Results ==
Home \ Away	ATB	ATM	BAR	CEL	DEP	ESP	JAE	OVI	OSA	RGI	RMA	RSA	RSO	SEV	VAL	VAD
Atlético Bilbao	—	1–1	2–1	5–1	3–0	0–0	0–0	4–0	0–1	3–1	2–3	5–1	1–3	2–2	1–2	2–1
Atlético Madrid	2–5	—	1–0	5–0	3–1	2–2	6–1	1–0	4–1	4–1	3–4	4–1	1–1	2–1	3–0	1–2
Barcelona	2–0	1–1	—	4–2	6–1	1–4	6–2	9–0	1–0	3–1	5–1	6–0	6–0	4–1	2–0	4–1
Celta	4–2	1–0	0–0	—	3–1	1–0	0–0	2–1	5–2	5–2	1–0	1–2	0–1	2–0	3–4	2–1
Deportivo La Coruña	2–0	1–0	1–0	0–0	—	1–0	6–0	2–1	1–0	2–1	2–2	4–2	3–0	0–1	1–1	1–1
Español	0–0	3–1	0–1	4–0	2–0	—	1–2	4–0	1–0	3–0	2–1	0–0	1–1	3–2	2–1	4–1
Jaén	1–3	1–0	2–2	3–2	4–0	4–0	—	2–2	5–3	6–1	1–2	4–2	1–1	3–1	3–1	4–2
Oviedo	0–1	0–0	3–0	0–1	0–1	1–1	2–2	—	3–0	1–0	0–4	2–1	1–3	3–1	2–1	3–1
Osasuna	3–2	3–1	1–0	2–2	3–2	2–3	2–0	1–2	—	3–2	1–1	2–1	2–1	1–0	2–2	4–0
Real Gijón	1–2	4–2	0–1	1–0	2–3	0–1	2–1	0–0	3–4	—	1–1	3–5	0–1	3–1	5–2	3–1
Real Madrid	2–3	2–1	5–0	3–0	2–1	4–3	6–0	1–0	2–0	4–0	—	4–2	1–1	1–0	4–0	1–2
Real Santander	1–1	2–2	4–3	1–0	0–0	2–1	3–1	1–1	3–0	3–1	1–1	—	4–2	2–1	3–1	1–3
Real Sociedad	1–1	1–1	0–3	4–4	4–1	2–0	2–1	1–0	2–0	1–2	3–6	1–2	—	3–2	0–3	1–0
Sevilla	3–1	2–1	3–1	1–0	1–2	3–1	5–2	2–1	2–1	6–3	2–1	2–1	5–0	—	1–1	3–1
Valencia	3–0	4–1	1–0	5–2	2–0	4–2	4–0	3–0	1–1	8–0	0–0	4–1	4–3	2–3	—	3–3
Valladolid	2–2	1–3	2–2	0–3	2–1	0–2	3–0	3–2	2–1	4–1	4–3	1–1	2–0	1–0	3–2	—

Source: BDFútbol
Legend: Blue = home team win; Yellow = draw; Red = away team win.

== Relegation group ==
=== Standings ===
Pos	Team	Pld	W	D	L	GF	GA	GD	Pts	Qualification
1	Málaga (O, P)	10	6	3	1	21	15	+6	15	Qualification to La Liga
2	Hércules (O, P)	10	5	3	2	16	10	+6	13	Qualification to La Liga
3	Osasuna (R)	10	4	3	3	23	20	+3	11	Qualification to Segunda División
4	Baracaldo	10	3	3	4	18	20	−2	9	Qualification to Segunda División
5	Lérida	10	3	2	5	27	30	−3	8	Qualification to Segunda División
6	Jaén (R)	10	1	2	7	15	25	−10	4	Qualification to Segunda División

Source: BDFútbol
Rules for classification: 1) Points; 2) Head-to-head results; 3) Goal difference; 4) Number of goals scored
(O) Play-off winners; (P) Promoted; (R) Relegated

=== Results ===
Home \ Away	BAR	HER	JAE	LER	MAL	OSA
Baracaldo	—	0–1	3–2	4–0	1–0	3–3
Hércules	2–2	—	2–0	6–1	1–1	2–0
Jaén	0–0	0–1	—	4–3	1–2	0–1
Lérida	7–2	5–1	2–2	—	1–2	2–2
Málaga	3–2	0–0	3–2	5–3	—	1–1
Osasuna	2–1	1–0	8–4	2–3	3–4	—

Source: BDFútbol
Legend: Blue = home team win; Yellow = draw; Red = away team win.

== Top scorers ==
Rank	Player	Club	Goals
1	(Argentina) Alfredo Di Stéfano	Real Madrid	27
2	(Spain) László Kubala	Barcelona	23
3	(Netherlands) Faas Wilkes	Valencia	18
4	(Spain) Adrián Escudero	Atlético Madrid	16
5	(Argentina) Roque Olsen	Real Madrid	15
6	(Spain) Pahiño	Deportivo La Coruña	14
6	(Spain) Justo Tejada	Barcelona	14
8	(Spain) Sabino Andonegui	Osasuna	13
8	(Spain) Luis Molowny	Real Madrid	13
8	(Spain) Loren	Sevilla	13
