= Larbi Benbarek =

Moroccan footballer

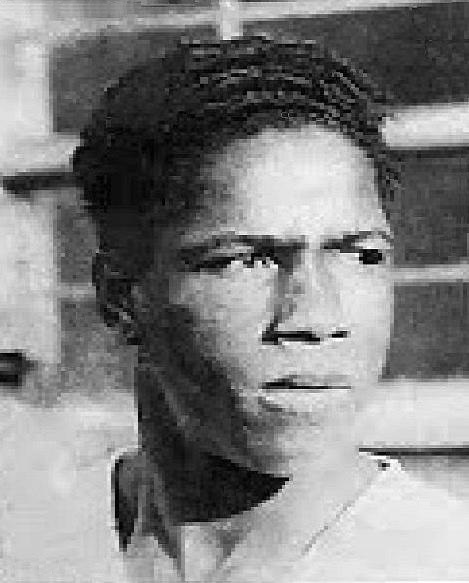
- Larbi Benbarek in 1940

Personal information
- Full name: Abdelkader Larbi Ben Embarek
- Date of birth: 16 June 1917
- Place of birth: Casablanca, Morocco
- Date of death: 16 September 1992 (aged 78)
- Place of death: Casablanca, Morocco
- Height: 1.78 m (5 ft 10 in)
- Positions: Forward; attacking midfielder

Youth career
- 1931—1934: FC El Ouatane

Senior career*
Years	Team	Apps	(Gls)
1934—1935	Idéal Club Marocain		
1935—1938	US Marocaine		
1938—1939	Marseille	30	(16)
1939—45	US Marocaine		
1945—1948	Stade Français	87	(47)
1948—1953	Atlético Madrid	114	(64)
1953—1955	Marseille	31	(18)
1955—1956	USM Bel Abbès		
1956—1957	FUS Rabat		

International career
1935–1937	Morocco (LMFA)	?	(?)
1938–1954	France	17	(6)

Managerial career
- 1956—1958: FUS Rabat
- 1957: Morocco
- 1958—1959: USM Bel Abbès
- 1960: Morocco
- * Club domestic league appearances and goals

Abdelkader Larbi Ben Embarek (Arabic: العربي بن مبارك; Tamazight: Lɛarbi ben-Bárək), also Ben Barek or Ben M'barek (16 June 1917 – 16 September 1992), was a Moroccan football player, who represented the France national team 17 times. He earned the sobriquet of the "Black Pearl" due to his technique and elegance on the ball, and is considered one of the greatest football players of his time, one of the first great African footballers, and the greatest French footballer prior to Raymond Kopa. Speaking on the Moroccan player, Pelé reportedly said: "If I am the king of football, Ben Barek is the god of football."

In a career interrupted by the Second World War, Benbarek became the first French footballer of international renown, as well as the first French footballer whose transfer to a foreign side, namely his move to Atlético Madrid in 1948, was the subject of high-level negotiations. He also represented the arrival of North African players to French football, and was one of the first players sought out by a French side from beyond the borders of Metropolitan France when he was signed by Marseille in 1938.

Despite not possessing a French passport, Benbarek led the French national team in the immediate post-war period, earning 17 caps over a span of nearly 16 years, which represented the longest international career by time span at the time, albeit that he only ever appeared in friendly matches for Les Bleus.

== Early life ==
Benbarek was born on 16 June 1917 in Casablanca, then part of French Morocco. The son of a dockworker, he lost his father at a very young age, after which he was largely raised by his eldest brother Ali. He grew up playing football in the Ferme-Blanche quarter of Casablanca alongside classmates including future professional boxer Marcel Cerdan and fellow future professional footballer Abdelkader Hamiri, despite initial objections from his mother and his eldest brother.

At the age of 14, whilst working locally as a carpenter, he began playing with a local amateur football team by the name of FC El Ouatane, initially as an inside forward before being moved to the position of winger.

== Career ==
=== Early career ===
In 1934, aged 17, Benbarek made his debut for Casablanca-based side Idéal Club Marocain, who competed in the second division of Moroccan football. His first match would be a friendly against fellow Casablanca side US Marocaine, who were three-time champions of North Africa, in a fixture in which Benbarek scored twice. Benbarek had a strong impact on the side, helping them reach 3rd in the league, and helping them reach the final of the 1935 Coupe du Maroc, which they narrowly lost to RC Marocain. These successes led to him being selected for the Morocco national team for the first time.

==== US Marocaine ====
In the summer of 1935, Benbarek was signed by US Marocaine, who offered him a job as a petrol station attendant for twenty francs a day, though rules of the time meant that he could only play for the club's reserve team for his first year. However, his performances there were still strong enough to earn him another call up. The following September, Benbarek was able to make his true debut with US Marocaine's first team, and he quickly attracted the attention of Metropolitan French clubs, which only intensified after an impressive display in a friendly between Morocco and France B in April 1937 earned him his first plaudits among the Metropolitan French press. His growing reputation led Marseille and their Hungarian coach József Eisenhoffer to come to Casablanca to try and recruit Benbarek, but talks were unsuccessful.

The following season, US Marocaine won the Ligue du Maroc before competing in the North African Championship. Following a 4—1 victory against Algerian side Joyeusetés d’Oran in the semi-final, they faced another Algerian side, JBAC Bône, in the final on the 12 June 1938, which the Moroccan side would lose 3—1 after extra time.

=== Marseille ===
Marseille were finally successful in signing Benbarak the following summer, beating off competition from Red Star, and he arrived by ship to Marseille on 28 June 1938 as a relatively unknown 20-year old. Benbarek made his first appearance for the club at centre-forward in a friendly against English third division side Southend United, scoring eight times in the match, before making his official debut on 24 November at the Vélodrome against Parisian side Racing Club de France. Facing up against France national team centre-back Auguste Jordan, Benbarek scored twice as his side ran out 5-2 victors. In future matches, he dropped into the position of inside left alongside Hungarian Vilmos Kohut, whilst Emmanuel Aznar led the line.

Despite having been initial favourites to win the Championship, Marseille ultimately lost out in June due to a 1—0 defeat on the final day of the season to Strasbourg, resulting in the title instead going to SC Sétois. In his first season at Marseille, Benbarek had scored 12 goals. The following summer, he returned to Marseille before the start of the anticipated 1939/40 season, playing four friendly matches in preparation. However, the league was cancelled due to the outbreak of war, which halted Benbarek's career, even if he himself was not called up to serve in the army as he was not a French citizen.

==== War years ====
Benbarek found refuge in Casablanca and returned to playing for US Marocaine. During World War II, he won four back-to-back Moroccan league titles with the club, and even a North African Championship in 1942.

=== Stade Français ===
In May 1945, with the war having come to an end in Europe, Casablanca welcomed a coaching course led by Helenio Herrera, during which Herrera convinced Benbarek to join Stade Français, whose president was assembling a star-studded team in Paris. Stade Français paid a reported fee of around a million francs for the Moroccan, and Benbarek proved to be a key player in the side as they gained promotion to the top flight, all whilst breaking revenue records. During his time at the club, he lived in a two-room apartment in Boulogne-Billancourt, opposite the Renault factories.

Over the following seasons, however, Benbarek was less impressive against a higher level of opposition, which led to fewer international call-ups, and eventually to the club's president deciding to cash in on his investment in the player, selling him to Spanish La Liga side Atlético Madrid in for a deal of 8 million francs and goalkeeper Marcel Domingo after three years with the club.

=== Atlético Madrid ===
In his first season with the Spanish club, Benbarek netted 6 times in 18 appearances as the side finished first in the league. Atlético Madrid went on to win back-to-back league titles in 1949—50 and 1950—51, as well as the 1951 Copa Eva Duarte (ancestor of the Spanish Super Cup), however, with Benbarek netting double figures in both seasons, as he would proceed to do in the following two seasons as well.

In total, Benbarek scored over 60 goals in 120 games for the club, forming a front line known as the 'Crystal Attack' alongside teammates Henry Carlsson and Adrián Escudero. He also earned a new nickname for himself with les Colchoneros: "the Foot of God". To this day, he remains one of Atlético Madrid's most legendary players, and is fondly remembered by fans of the club.

=== Late career ===
==== Return to Marseille ====
Benbarek returned to Marseille in December 1953, and went on to score 5 goals in the league and 5 more in the Coupe de France as his side reached the final, which they lost 2—1 to a Just Fontaine-led OGC Nice.

==== USM Bel Abbès ====
In 1955, Benbarek signed with USM Bel Abbès, in an Algeria in the midst of a war for liberation. His new side finished runners-up of the Oranie football league and reached the final of the North African Cup, where they were set to play SC Bel Abbès. The final was called off, however, due to the competition being suspended after the withdrawal of sides from Morocco, Constantine, and Tunisia.

==== FUS Rabat ====
The following season, he received a request from Crown Prince Moulay El-Hassan to return to his home country in order to lend his services and expertise to the improvement of Moroccan football. He thus signed for FUS Rabat in the capacity of player-coach, and after one season with the club, he officially called an end to his professional football career at the age of 40, committing instead to his coaching career.

== International career ==
=== Morocco ===
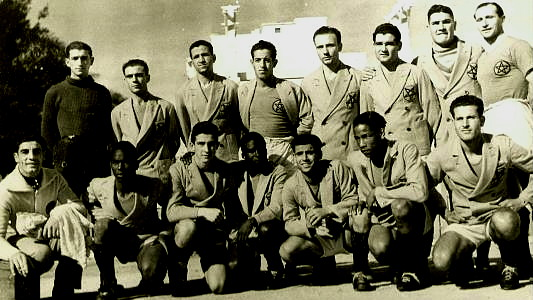
Benbarek with Morocco in 1942

Benbarek was first called up to represent the Morocco national team in 1935 for a game against Oran, but was an unused substitute. He would again be called up for another match against Oran in 1936, and again for a fixture against France B in April 1937, which would draw the attention of the Metropolitan French press for the first time.

=== France ===
In December 1938, after only three months of playing in France with Marseille, popular demand saw Benbarek called up to the France national team for the first time by manager Gaston Barreau. Despite being born in a French protectorate, Benbarek did not actually possess a French passport, which should have disallowed him from being able to play for France in the eyes of FIFA, who require players to at minimum possess a passport from the country they are representing, but as FIFA never received any complaints about Benbarek playing for France, they never actually looked into the case. Consequently, he was able to make his debut for France on the 4 December 1938 in a 1—0 defeat against recent world champions Italy in Naples, where he, alongside fellow French player of African descent Raoul Diagne, was subjected to racist abuse.

On the 22 January 1939, Benbarek played in a 4—0 win over Poland at the Parc des Princes and was involved in three of the four goals. Around this time, French sporting newspaper L'Auto launched an appeal to find a sobriquet for Benbarek, resulting in the name "the Black Pearl". Two months later, he netted his first international goal against Hungary in a 2—2 draw, and two months after that contributed to a 3—1 victory over Belgium.

==== Second World War ====
In 1943, during the Second World War which Benbarek spent back in Casablanca having not been called up for the army as he was not legally a French citizen, he featured for a North African team in a match against a French exiles team. He scored an equaliser in the game from a cross from future world champion boxer Marcel Cerdan, and the fixture ended as a 1-1 draw.

=== Return to France ===
Benbarek's return to France with Stade Français in 1945 allowed him to once again be called up by France, but he didn't shine in two away defeats in late 1945 against Austria and Belgium. He made four more appearances for France in April and May 1946, including France's first victory against England.

Due to less impressive club form following Stade Français' promotion to the top flight, Benbarek received fewer call-ups over the next two years, only appearing twice in 1947 in two fixtures against Portugal, including a home victory in March and a 4-2 away defeat in November which he scored in. He earned more caps in 1948, however, appearing in two defeats against Italy and Belgium, the latter of which he scored his third and final international goal in, and in two victories against Scotland and Czechoslovakia.

==== Move to Spain ====
Benbarek's 1948 move to Spanish side Atlético Madrid was poorly received in France, and led to him not appearing in the national side for another six years due to the relationship between club and national sides at the time, as clubs tended to refuse to free up foreign players for national team selections and football federations were unwilling to pay the cost of the return journey.

==== Final bow ====
Having returned to Marseille and France in December 1953, Benbarek took part in early October 1954 in a charity match at the Parc des Princes for victims of the 1954 Chlef earthquake in Algeria, playing in a North Africa XI against France, which the North African side would win 3-2. Benbarek's performance in the match and his prestige were such that the French public successfully demanded his re-inclusion in the national team. He was included, aged 37, in the French squad to play West Germany in Hanover on the 16 October 1954, a fixture which he started in. Unfortunately, however, he was injected within half an hour, and had to be taken off, which would also represent the end of his international career.

One of the finest players ever to represent France, he made a total of 17 appearances and scored 3 goals for Les Bleus between 1938 and 1954. At 37 years and 4 months old at the time of his final appearance, he held the record of oldest player to ever represent France for a long time, but has since been passed by Bernard Lama and Steve Mandanda. Benbarek still holds the record, however, of the longest career with the France national team, spanning 15 years and 10 months from his debut in December 1938 to his final appearance in October 1954, as of September 2025. He is also one of only four Moroccans to have played for France, and the only one to have earned a double digits number of caps.

== Style of play ==
Benbarek played as a striker and as a sort of attacking midfielder, and was described as lively and powerful, as well as having exceptional technique and above-average stamina. In Morocco, he also played as a wing-half and as a centre-half.

For nearly two decades, Benbarek captivated crowds with his jumping ability, passing skills, and dribbling, who was set apart by his elegance, fluidity, balance, and sense of showmanship. Fellow France legend Just Fontaine described Benbarek as having been in the same league as Pelé and Di Stefano, and attributes his lesser reputation to the fact that Benbarek largely played before television, and thus could not be watched by everyone as could latter players.

== Coaching career ==
After his retirement from playing, Benbarek continued managing FUS Rabat, and in 1957 was charged with preparing the Morocco national team for the second edition of the Arab Games in Beirut, Lebanon. At the games, Morocco managed to hold Iraq to a draw and defeat Libya and Tunisia, which earned them the gold medal. Benbarek was then dismissed by the Royal Moroccan Football Federation.

In 1958, he accepted the position of coach at his former club USM Bel Abbès for one season.

In 1960, Benbarek returned to coach Morocco for one final time.

== Later life ==
Larbi Ben Barek died in his hometown on 16 September 1992, alone and in dire poverty, with his body only discovered three days after his death.

== Legacy ==
Six years after his death, he was awarded the FIFA Order of Merit, FIFA's highest honour, and King Hassan II renamed the Stade Philip to the Larbi Benbarek Stadium in his honour. In December 2020, French President Emmanuel Macron named Benbarek as one of the prominent figures from overseas territories, former colonies, or immigrant backgrounds who had helped shape France, in an effort to encourage honouring such figures by naming streets and public buildings after them.

== Honours ==
US Marocaine

- Moroccan League: 1937–38, 1939–40, 1940–41, 1941–42, 1942–43
- Moroccan Cup: 1936, 1941, 1944
- North African Championship: 1941–42

Atlético de Madrid

- La Liga: 1949–50, 1950–51
- Copa Eva Duarte: 1951

Morocco (LMFA)

- Morocco-Oranie inter-leagues: 1936

Recognitions

- FIFA Order of Merit: 1998
- IFFHS All-time Morocco Men's Dream Team
- So Foot Top 1000 Best Players of the French First Division: 285th
