= Marquitos (footballer, born 1933) =

Spanish footballer

Personal information
- Full name: Marcos Alonso Imaz
- Date of birth: 16 April 1933
- Place of birth: Santander, Spain
- Date of death: 6 March 2012 (aged 78)
- Place of death: Santander, Spain
- Height: 1.82 m (6 ft 0 in)
- Position: Defender

Youth career
- Salesianos Santander
- Kostka
- Racing Santander

Senior career*
Years	Team	Apps	(Gls)
1951–1954	Racing Santander	42	(0)
1954–1962	Real Madrid	158	(2)
1962–1963	Hércules	18	(0)
1963–1964	Murcia	24	(1)
1964–1966	Calvo Sotelo	30	(1)
1970–1971	Toluca Santander		
Total		272	(4)

International career
1955	Spain B	2	(0)
1955–1960	Spain	2	(0)
- * Club domestic league appearances and goals

Marcos Alonso Imaz (16 April 1933 – 6 March 2012), nicknamed Marquitos, was a Spanish footballer who played as a defender. He was best known for his participation in Real Madrid's five European Cup conquests, mainly in the 1950s.

== Club career ==
Marquitos was born in Santander, Cantabria. During his career, he played for his hometown club Racing de Santander, Real Madrid, Hércules CF, Real Murcia, Calvo Sotelo and local amateurs Toluca de Santander.

With Real Madrid, Marquitos won six La Liga championships and five European Cups. In the 1955–56 edition of the latter, he scored a rare goal as he equalised 3–3 against Stade de Reims in an eventual 4–3 victory.

== International career ==
From 1955 to 1960, Marquitos earned two caps for Spain, appearing in as many friendlies.

== Personal life and death ==
Marquitos' son, Marcos Alonso Peña, was also a footballer, and a coach. He represented, with success, Atlético Madrid, FC Barcelona and Spain – amongst others. His grandson Marcos Alonso Mendoza also played for Real Madrid and Spain, and also had a lengthy spell in England, notably with Bolton Wanderers and Chelsea.

Marquitos died on 6 March 2012 in his hometown of Santander, one month shy of his 79th birthday.

== Honours ==
Real Madrid

- La Liga: 1954–55, 1956–57, 1957–58, 1960–61, 1961–62
- Copa del Generalísimo: 1961–62
- Latin Cup: 1957
- European Cup: 1955–56, 1956–57, 1957–58, 1958–59, 1959–60
- Intercontinental Cup: 1960
