= Adrián Escudero =

Spanish footballer

Personal information
- Full name: Adrián Escudero García
- Date of birth: 24 November 1927
- Place of birth: Madrid, Spain
- Date of death: 7 March 2011 (aged 83)
- Place of death: Madrid, Spain
- Height: 1.81 m (5 ft 11 in)
- Position: Striker

Youth career
- Banco Hispano Americano

Senior career*
Years	Team	Apps	(Gls)
1945	Mediodía		
1945–1958	Atlético Madrid	287	(169)

International career
1949	Spain B	1	(1)
1952–1956	Spain	3	(1)

Managerial career
- 1963: Atlético Madrid
- 1967–1968: Badajoz
- * Club domestic league appearances and goals

Adrián Escudero García (24 November 1927 – 7 March 2011) was a Spanish footballer who played as a striker.

He is the third all-time leading goalscorer for Atlético Madrid with 169 goals, having appeared for the club in 13 La Liga seasons and played in more than 350 official games.

== Club career ==
Escudero arrived at Atlético Madrid in late 1945 from local amateurs Club Deportivo Mediodía. He ended his first season in La Liga with ten games and two goals, but scored in double digits in eight of the following ten campaigns, most notably contributing with 28 goals combined as the Colchoneros won back-to-back national championships in the early 1950s.

On 8 March 1953, Escudero netted Atlético's 1000th goal in the top division, in a 2–3 away loss against Celta de Vigo, through a penalty kick.

On 6 January 1955, for the tenth season of Escudero at Atlético de Madrid, the player received a testmonial match in which the rivals of Real Madrid agreed to let Alfredo Di Stéfano, Luis Molowny and Joaquín Oliva play for Atleti. At that time, Atlético was still the Madrid most champion club at La Liga, with Di Stéfano's team reaching by the end of the 1954–55 season the same amount of four titles then.

At the end of 1957–58, Escudero did not have his contract renewed and decided to retire from football, aged only 30. He continued working with Atlético Madrid in the following years, first as youth team coach, then as assistant manager. After the sacking of Rafael García Repullo (his former teammate) early into the 1963–64 season, he was an interim for one round, a 1–2 defeat at Valencia CF on 29 December 1963.

Escudero died on 7 March 2011 in his hometown of Madrid, at the age of 83.

== International career ==
Escudero earned three caps for Spain in three-and-a-half years, his debut coming on 7 December 1952 in a friendly with Argentina played in Madrid (0–1 loss). In his only official appearance, on 17 March 1954, he scored against Turkey for the 1954 FIFA World Cup qualifiers – the third playoff match ended 2–2 in Rome, and the Spaniards were eliminated after a drawing of lots.

=== International goals ===
#	Date	Venue	Opponent	Score	Result	Competition
1.	17 March 1954	Stadio Olimpico, Roma, Italy	Turkey	2–2	2–2	1954 World Cup qualification

== Honours ==
Atlético Madrid

- La Liga: 1949–50, 1950–51
- Copa Eva Duarte: 1951
- Copa del Generalísimo: Runner-up 1956

Individual

- Monchín Triana Trophy: 1956–57
