= José Becerril =

Spanish footballer (1926–1982)

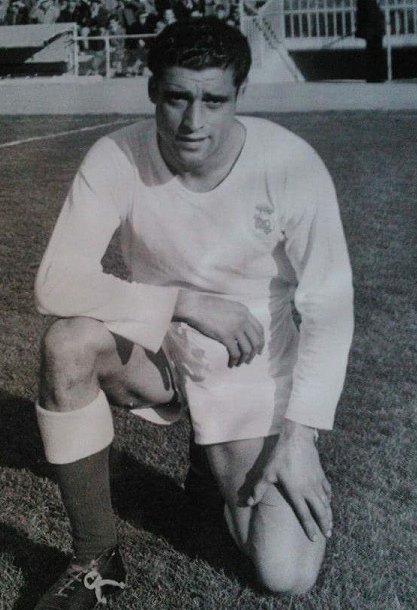

Personal information
- Full name: José Becerril Minguela
- Date of birth: 21 August 1926
- Place of birth: Madrid, Spain
- Date of death: 24 May 1982 (aged 55)
- Height: 1.72 m (5 ft 8 in)
- Position: Midfielder

José Becerril (21 August 1926 – 30 May 1982) was a Spanish footballer who played as a midfielder for Real Madrid.
