= Antonio Imbelloni =

Argentine footballer and manager (1924–2018)

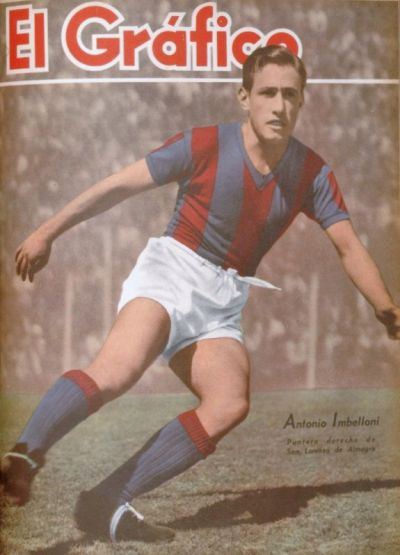
- Imbelloni playing for San Lorenzo de Almagro

Personal information
- Full name: Antonio Mario Imbelloni Di Leo
- Date of birth: 25 August 1924
- Place of birth: Lanús, Argentina
- Date of death: 2018 (aged 93–94)
- Height: 1.69 m (5 ft 7 in)
- Position: Forward

Antonio Mario Imbelloni Di Leo (25 August 1924 in Gerli, Buenos Aires, Argentina – 2018) was an Argentinian footballer who played as a forward.

== Playing career ==
Antonio Imbelloni played for Dock Sud (1944), San Lorenzo (1945–1949), Banfield (1949), Almirante Brown (1950), Real Madrid (1950–1951), RCD Córdoba (1951–1952), Atlético CP (1951–1952/1953–1954), Deportivo Morón (1953), Braga (1954–1956), Sporting (1956–1958) and Marinhense (1961–1962).

Club	Country	Year
Sportivo Dock Sud	Argentina	1944
San Lorenzo de Almagro	Argentina	1945–1949
Club Atlético Banfield	Argentina	1949
Club Almirante Brown	Argentina	1950
Real Madrid CF	Spain	1950–1951
RCD Córdoba	Spain	1951–1952
Atlético Clube de Portugal	Portugal	1951–1952
Deportivo Morón	Argentina	1953
Atlético Clube de Portugal	Portugal	1953–1954
S.C. Braga	Portugal	1954–1956
Sporting CP	Portugal	1956–1958
A.C. Marinhense	Portugal	1961–1962

== Managerial career ==
Imbelloni managed Atlético CP (1954–1955/1962–1963), S.C. Braga (1954–1956/1977–1978), C.F. Monterrey (1956–1957), Sporting CP (1958 and 1960), Académica OAF (1960–1961), A.C. Marinhense (1961–1962), F.C. Barreirense (1962–1963), Argentina S20 (1967), Millonarios F.C. (1968), Ferro Carril Oeste (1969 and 1970), F.C. Famalicão (1978–1979), Vitória S.C. (1979–1980) and Naval (1985–1986).

Club	Country	Year
Atlético CP	Portugal	1954–1955
S.C. Braga	Portugal	1954–1956
C.F. Monterrey	Mexico	1956–1957
Sporting CP	Portugal	1958–1960
Académica OAF	Portugal	1960–1961
A.C. Marinhense	Portugal	1961–1962
F.C. Barreirense	Portugal	1962–1963
Atlético CP	Portugal	1962–1963
Argentina S20	Argentina	1967
Millonarios F.C.	Colombia	1968
Ferro Carril Oeste	Argentina	1969–1970
S.C. Braga	Portugal	1977–1978
F.C. Famalicão	Portugal	1978–1979
Vitória S.C.	Portugal	1979–1980
Naval	Portugal	1985–1986
