= Wilson Jones (footballer, born 1934) =

Spanish footballer (1934–2021)

Personal information
- Full name: Wilson Alfredo Jones Rodríguez
- Date of birth: 19 May 1934
- Place of birth: O Barco de Valdeorras, Spain
- Date of death: 12 July 2021 (aged 87)
- Position: Midfielder

Senior career*
Years	Team	Apps	(Gls)
1953–1954	Lérida	26	(12)
1954–1955	Alavés	22	(17)
1955–1957	Real Madrid	1	(0)
1957–1960	Zaragoza	91	(31)
1960–1962	Racing de Santander	15	(4)
1962–1965	Ourense	59	(20)
Total		214	(84)
- * Club domestic league appearances and goals

Wilson Alfredo Jones Rodríguez (19 May 1934 – 12 July 2021) was a Spanish professional footballer who played as a midfielder.

== Career ==
Born in O Barco de Valdeorras, Jones played for Lérida, Alavés, Real Madrid, Zaragoza, Racing de Santander and Ourense.
