= Joaquín Murillo =

Spanish footballer

Joaquín Murillo Pascual (February 27, 1932–January 10, 2009) was a Spanish footballer who played as a striker.

== Biography ==
Joaquín Murillo Pascual was born in Barcelona, on February 27, 1932.

In 1954, he joined Real Valladolid CF, where he played for three seasons. Then he played at Real Zaragoza, for whom he scored 113 goals in 178 official matches. With 88 goals in the league, he is the top scorer in the history of Real Zaragoza. After Raul Tamudo, he is the Catalan player with the most goals in the First Division with 132 goals.

After retiring from sport, Murillo settled in Zaragoza, where he ran a chain of liquor stores. He would die at the age of 76, on January 10, 2009.

== Clubs ==
- Real Valladolid C.F., Spain, 1954–1957
- Real Zaragoza, Spain, 1957–1964
- C.E. Europa, Spain, 1964–1965

== Honours ==
Real Zaragoza

- Copa del Rey: 1964
- Inter-Cities Fairs Cup: 1964
