= 1956–57 La Liga =

26th season of La Liga

Primera División
- Season: 1956–57
- Champions: Real Madrid (5th title)
- Relegated: Deportivo La Coruña; Condal
- European Cup: Real Madrid; Sevilla (as Real Madrid qualified as holders)
- Latin Cup: Real Madrid
- Matches: 240
- Goals: 777 (3.24 per match)
- Top goalscorer: Alfredo Di Stéfano (31 goals)
- Biggest home win: Atlético Madrid 8–1 Español
- Biggest away win: Deportivo La Coruña 1–6 Barcelona
- Highest scoring: Barcelona 7–3 Atlético Madrid

The 1956–57 La Liga was the 26th season since its establishment. The season began on 9 September 1956, and concluded on 21 April 1957. Real Madrid won their fifth title.

== Format changes ==
For this season, the relegation playoffs was eliminated and the two last qualified teams were directly relegated to Segunda División.

== Team locations ==
Location of teams in 1956–57 La Liga
Location of teams in 1956–57 La Liga (Canary Islands)

After their promotion, España Industrial was renamed as Condal.

Team	Home city	Stadium
Atlético Bilbao	Bilbao	San Mamés
Atlético Madrid	Madrid	Metropolitano
Barcelona	Barcelona	Las Corts
Celta	Vigo	Balaidos
Condal	Barcelona	Las Corts
Deportivo La Coruña	A Coruña	Riazor
Español	Barcelona	Sarriá
Jaén	Jaén	La Victoria
Las Palmas	Las Palmas	Insular
Osasuna	Pamplona	San Juan
Real Madrid	Madrid	Santiago Bernabéu
Real Sociedad	San Sebastián	Atocha
Sevilla	Seville	Nervión
Valencia	Valencia	Mestalla
Valladolid	Valladolid	Municipal
Zaragoza	Zaragoza	Torrero

== League table ==
Pos	Team	Pld	W	D	L	GF	GA	GD	Pts	Qualification or relegation
1	Real Madrid (C)	30	20	4	6	74	35	+39	44	Qualification for the European Cup first round and for the Latin Cup
2	Sevilla	30	17	5	8	64	49	+15	39	Qualification for the European Cup preliminary round (Note: Sevilla qualified for the European Cup as Real Madrid qualified as title holders.)
3	Barcelona	30	16	7	7	70	37	+33	39	
4	Atlético Bilbao	30	16	5	9	59	45	+14	37	
5	Atlético Madrid	30	15	4	11	65	45	+20	34	
6	Osasuna	30	12	7	11	40	38	+2	31	
7	Español	30	11	8	11	39	48	−9	30	
8	Valladolid	30	11	6	13	52	58	−6	28	
9	Zaragoza	30	11	6	13	37	51	−14	28	
10	Las Palmas	30	9	9	12	41	58	−17	27	
11	Valencia	30	10	7	13	43	46	−3	27	
12	Real Sociedad	30	9	8	13	39	47	−8	26	
13	Celta Vigo	30	8	7	15	39	47	−8	23	
14	Jaén	30	9	5	16	37	55	−18	23	
15	Deportivo La Coruña (R)	30	10	2	18	41	61	−20	22	Relegation to the Segunda División
16	Condal (R)	30	7	8	15	37	57	−20	22	Relegation to the Segunda División

Source: BDFútbol
Rules for classification: 1) Points; 2) Head-to-head results; 3) Goal difference; 4) Number of goals scored
(C) Champions; (R) Relegated

== Results ==
Home \ Away	ATB	ATM	BAR	CEL	CON	DEP	ESP	JAE	LPA	OSA	RMA	RSO	SEV	VAL	VAD	ZAR
Atlético Bilbao	—	1–4	1–1	1–0	3–0	2–0	4–0	3–1	3–0	1–1	4–2	2–0	5–0	3–1	4–0	5–0
Atlético Madrid	0–0	—	2–1	1–0	6–2	6–0	8–1	1–1	3–0	2–0	2–4	3–0	1–2	1–0	1–3	2–1
Barcelona	2–0	7–3	—	4–1	5–0	3–1	1–1	4–2	6–1	2–0	1–0	1–0	1–1	3–2	4–0	4–2
Celta	3–0	1–0	0–2	—	2–2	1–1	0–0	4–0	3–3	1–0	0–3	2–3	3–3	2–1	1–1	5–0
Condal	3–3	1–2	1–1	0–3	—	2–1	3–0	1–0	2–0	0–0	0–1	1–1	5–1	1–1	4–0	0–0
Deportivo La Coruña	1–2	0–4	1–6	0–3	3–0	—	2–1	3–1	1–2	3–1	1–2	4–0	3–1	1–0	3–0	4–1
Español	3–0	0–1	2–0	2–0	2–1	2–0	—	3–0	2–0	1–1	0–0	1–0	2–2	3–0	4–0	2–0
Jaén	4–2	2–0	1–2	2–0	2–0	2–3	0–0	—	0–0	2–0	2–4	3–0	3–1	2–2	2–0	0–1
Las Palmas	4–0	1–1	1–0	1–0	3–3	2–0	2–2	2–0	—	1–1	1–5	1–1	2–1	1–0	3–2	0–1
Osasuna	1–2	2–1	2–2	2–1	2–1	1–0	5–0	1–1	2–1	—	2–0	1–2	5–2	2–0	1–0	2–0
Real Madrid	3–0	0–2	1–0	4–1	6–0	1–0	7–2	7–1	3–0	2–1	—	3–0	1–1	2–0	3–1	3–3
Real Sociedad	3–4	2–1	2–2	3–0	1–0	2–0	1–0	2–0	2–2	0–0	3–0	—	1–1	1–2	2–3	1–1
Sevilla	4–1	5–1	2–1	2–0	2–1	5–1	3–0	3–0	3–1	3–1	2–0	3–2	—	3–2	2–0	3–0
Valencia	1–2	2–2	3–3	3–1	1–0	3–0	3–1	3–1	2–2	4–1	1–2	3–2	2–0	—	0–0	1–0
Valladolid	2–0	4–3	2–1	1–1	3–0	3–2	2–2	1–2	6–2	3–0	3–3	2–2	1–2	4–0	—	4–1
Zaragoza	1–1	2–1	2–0	2–0	2–3	2–2	2–0	2–0	3–2	0–2	1–2	1–0	3–1	0–0	3–1	—

Source: BDFútbol
Legend: Blue = home team win; Yellow = draw; Red = away team win.

== Pichichi Trophy ==
Rank	Player	Club	Goals
1	(Spain) Alfredo Di Stéfano	Real Madrid	31
2	(Spain) Joaquín Murillo	Valladolid	18
3	(Spain) Manuel Badenes	Valladolid	17
4	(Spain) Mauro Rodríguez	Celta	16
