= Roque Olsen =

Argentine footballer and manager

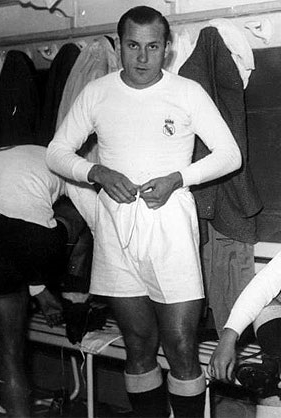

Personal information
- Full name: Roque Germán Olsen Fontana
- Date of birth: 9 September 1925
- Place of birth: Sauce de Luna, Argentina
- Date of death: 15 June 1992 (aged 66)
- Place of death: Sevilla, Spain
- Position: Striker

Youth career
- Patronato Paraná

Senior career*
Years	Team	Apps	(Gls)
1949	Tigre		
1950	Racing Club	15	(6)
1950–1957	Real Madrid	110	(60)
1957–1959	Córdoba		

Managerial career
- 1959–1963: Córdoba
- 1963–1964: Deportivo La Coruña
- 1964–1965: Zaragoza
- 1965–1967: Barcelona
- 1967–1968: Zaragoza
- 1969–1970: Celta Vigo
- 1970: Deportivo La Coruña
- 1971–1974: Elche
- 1974–1976: Sevilla
- 1976–1977: Las Palmas
- 1977–1978: Elche
- 1978–1980: Cádiz
- 1980–1981: Recreativo
- 1984: Elche
- 1984–1985: Las Palmas
- 1985–1986: Elche
- 1988: Las Palmas
- 1989: Sevilla
- 1991: Las Palmas
- 1991–1992: Las Palmas
- * Club domestic league appearances and goals

Roque Germán Olsen Fontana (9 September 1925 – 15 June 1992), commonly known as Roque Olsen, was an Argentine football player and manager.

== Playing career ==
Olsen started his playing career in the local leagues of Parana, Entre Ríos. In 1949 he was signed by Tigre, the following year he joined champions Racing Club de Avellaneda. After playing 15 games for Racing Club, he joined Real Madrid where he went on to become one of the club's most important goal scorers. He played out his career with Córdoba CF in the late 1950s.

== Managerial career ==
Olsen started his managerial career with Córdoba CF leading them to promotion to La Liga in 1962. He then managed Deportivo La Coruña, Real Zaragoza and FC Barcelona. He also managed Elche CF, Sevilla FC and Celta Vigo. His last managerial position before his death in 1992 was as manager of UD Las Palmas.
