= 1954–55 La Liga =

24th season of La Liga

Primera División
- Season: 1954–55
- Champions: Real Madrid (4th title)
- Relegated: Real Santander; Málaga
- European Cup: Real Madrid
- Latin Cup: Real Madrid
- Inter-Cities Fairs Cup: Barcelona
- Matches: 240
- Goals: 899 (3.75 per match)
- Top goalscorer: Juan Arza (29 goals)
- Biggest away win: Real Santander 0–4 Real Madrid
- Highest scoring: Atlético Bilbao 9–2 Las Palmas
- Longest winning run: 6 matches Atlético Bilbao
- Longest unbeaten run: 13 matches Real Madrid
- Longest winless run: 7 matches Celta; Málaga
- Longest losing run: 5 matches Málaga

The 1954–55 La Liga was the 24th season since its establishment. Real Madrid were the defending champions and retained the title.

== Teams ==
=== Stadia and locations ===
Location of teams in 1954–55 La Liga
Location of teams in 1954–55 (Canary Islands)

Team	Home city	Stadium	Capacity
Alavés	Vitoria	Mendizorroza	7,500
Atlético Bilbao	Bilbao	San Mamés	40,400
Atlético Madrid	Madrid	Metropolitano	56,717
Barcelona	Barcelona	Las Corts	46,000
Celta	Vigo	Balaidos	15,850
Deportivo La Coruña	A Coruña	Riazor	22,182
Español	Barcelona	Sarriá	30,000
Hércules	Alicante	La Viña	14,024
Las Palmas	Las Palmas	Insular	12,000
Málaga	Málaga	La Rosaleda	8,734
Real Madrid	Madrid	Nuevo Chamartín	90,123
Real Santander	Santander	El Sardinero	21,800
Real Sociedad	San Sebastián	Atocha	21,650
Sevilla	Seville	Nervión	30,000
Valencia	Valencia	Mestalla	33,567
Valladolid	Valladolid	Municipal	16,555

== League table ==
Pos	Team	Pld	W	D	L	GF	GA	GD	Pts	Qualification or relegation
1	Real Madrid (C)	30	20	6	4	80	31	+49	46	Qualification for the European Cup and for the Latin Cup
2	Barcelona	30	17	7	6	75	39	+36	41	Invited for the Inter-Cities Fairs Cup
3	Atlético Bilbao	30	15	9	6	78	39	+39	39	
4	Sevilla	30	15	4	11	74	58	+16	34	
5	Valencia	30	15	3	12	71	60	+11	33	
6	Hércules	30	11	9	10	46	57	−11	31	
7	Deportivo La Coruña	30	12	6	12	52	59	−7	30	
8	Atlético Madrid	30	11	7	12	59	64	−5	29	
9	Valladolid	30	11	5	14	48	56	−8	27	
10	Alavés	30	11	5	14	51	62	−11	27	
11	Celta Vigo	30	10	7	13	55	60	−5	27	
12	Las Palmas	30	10	7	13	45	69	−24	27	
13	Español (O)	30	8	10	12	42	46	−4	26	Qualification for the relegation group
14	Real Sociedad (O)	30	9	6	15	48	53	−5	24	Qualification for the relegation group
15	Real Santander (R)	30	9	2	19	39	81	−42	20	Relegation to the Segunda División
16	Málaga (R)	30	6	7	17	36	65	−29	19	Relegation to the Segunda División

Source: BDFútbol
Rules for classification: 1) Points; 2) Head-to-head results; 3) Goal difference; 4) Number of goals scored
(C) Champions; (O) Play-off winners; (R) Relegated

== Results ==
Home \ Away	ALA	ATB	ATM	BAR	CEL	DEP	ESP	HER	LPA	MAL	RMA	RSA	RSO	SEV	VAL	VAD
Alavés	—	2–2	2–0	2–2	2–0	2–1	2–2	2–0	4–1	5–1	2–4	2–1	0–1	2–1	7–0	1–4
Atlético Bilbao	4–0	—	1–1	1–1	2–2	5–1	1–2	3–0	9–2	6–1	2–0	3–0	1–0	2–2	7–0	1–0
Atlético Madrid	4–1	1–2	—	2–2	4–0	2–1	2–1	3–0	2–2	2–2	2–4	3–1	4–0	0–3	2–3	5–4
Barcelona	5–2	2–3	4–0	—	5–2	3–1	1–0	1–1	1–0	5–0	2–2	7–0	4–1	4–2	4–1	5–0
Celta	2–0	1–0	8–1	1–1	—	2–0	1–1	1–1	5–1	3–0	1–1	2–1	5–1	5–1	2–1	2–2
Deportivo La Coruña	3–0	1–1	1–0	2–2	4–2	—	1–1	2–1	4–1	3–2	3–3	3–1	2–1	4–2	2–1	2–1
Español	4–1	1–3	2–0	2–4	4–0	2–2	—	4–1	0–0	1–1	1–3	1–0	1–0	2–0	1–1	1–1
Hércules	2–2	3–2	4–0	1–0	2–1	4–2	0–0	—	4–0	1–0	1–1	2–0	4–1	1–1	3–2	2–1
Las Palmas	2–2	3–3	4–1	2–0	3–1	2–1	2–1	1–1	—	2–1	1–1	5–1	2–2	4–0	1–0	2–0
Málaga	2–1	1–3	0–3	1–2	0–0	0–1	1–1	3–3	2–0	—	3–1	3–1	2–1	0–2	1–1	1–2
Real Madrid	4–1	3–1	1–0	3–0	5–1	5–1	5–1	3–0	7–0	4–1	—	3–0	1–1	3–1	1–2	1–0
Real Santander	0–2	1–4	2–4	2–1	3–1	2–1	3–1	1–1	2–1	2–1	0–4	—	3–3	3–1	3–2	2–1
Real Sociedad	2–0	3–3	0–2	0–2	5–0	3–0	1–0	4–0	4–0	1–1	1–3	3–0	—	1–2	3–0	3–3
Sevilla	1–2	1–1	3–3	0–2	5–2	3–2	3–2	6–1	4–0	6–1	1–0	5–2	5–2	—	2–1	5–1
Valencia	6–1	3–2	4–4	4–1	2–1	4–0	2–0	8–2	4–0	0–2	1–3	8–1	2–0	3–1	—	2–1
Valladolid	1–0	1–0	2–2	1–2	2–1	1–1	4–2	2–0	2–1	3–2	0–1	3–1	1–0	2–5	2–3	—

Source: BDFútbol
Legend: Blue = home team win; Yellow = draw; Red = away team win.

== Relegation group ==
=== Standings ===
Pos	Team	Pld	W	D	L	GF	GA	GD	Pts	Qualification
1	Español (O, P)	10	7	1	2	17	8	+9	15	Qualification to La Liga
2	Real Sociedad (O, P)	10	6	1	3	20	14	+6	13	Qualification to La Liga
3	Oviedo	10	5	1	4	22	20	+2	11	Qualification to Segunda División
4	Atlético Tetuán	10	4	2	4	17	15	+2	10	Qualification to Segunda División
5	Zaragoza	10	3	0	7	13	17	−4	6	Qualification to Segunda División
6	Granada	10	2	1	7	13	28	−15	5	Qualification to Segunda División

Source: BDFútbol
Rules for classification: 1) Points; 2) Head-to-head results; 3) Goal difference; 4) Number of goals scored
(O) Play-off winners; (P) Promoted

=== Results ===
Home \ Away	TET	ESP	GRA	OVI	RSO	ZAR
Atlético Tetuán	—	1–2	4–0	2–3	2–2	2–0
Español	4–1	—	0–0	1–0	1–2	1–0
Granada	3–1	1–3	—	2–3	1–2	3–1
Oviedo	0–0	1–3	6–2	—	1–0	6–0
Real Sociedad	1–2	2–1	6–1	3–2	—	0–2
Zaragoza	0–2	0–1	2–0	7–0	1–2	—

Source: BDFútbol
Legend: Blue = home team win; Yellow = draw; Red = away team win.

== Top scorers ==
Rank	Player	Club	Goals
1	(Spain) Juan Arza	Sevilla	29
2	(Spain) Alfredo Di Stéfano	Real Madrid	25
3	(Spain) Manuel Badenes	Valencia	22
4	(Spain) Arieta I	Athletic Bilbao	19
5	(Spain) Héctor Rial	Real Madrid	18
5	(Spain) Pahiño	Deportivo La Coruña	18
7	(Spain) Wilson	Alavés	17
8	(Spain) José Artetxe	Athletic Bilbao	16
8	(Spain) Juan Araujo	Sevilla	16
10	(Spain) Pablo Olmedo	Celta	15
10	(Spain) Joaquín Murillo	Valladolid	15

== Other websites ==
- (in Spanish) Official LFP Site
