= Joaquín Oliva =

Spanish footballer

Joaquín Oliva Gomá (11 November 1926 in Guissona, Spain – 4 February 1993) was a Spanish professional association football player, who played as a defender.

== Clubs ==
The most important part of his career is represented by the period he played for Real Madrid. He started over 100 matches for the Spanish side.

Club	Country	Period	Number of matches
CE Sabadell	Spain	1947–1949	30
RCD Espanyol	Spain	1949–1950	6
Real Madrid C.F.	Spain	1950–1957	103
Real Jaén	Spain	1957–1958	28

== Titles ==
- 3 La Liga
- 2 European Cup

== See also ==
- List of football clubs in Spain
- Football in Spain
