= Héctor Rial =

Footballer (1928–1991)

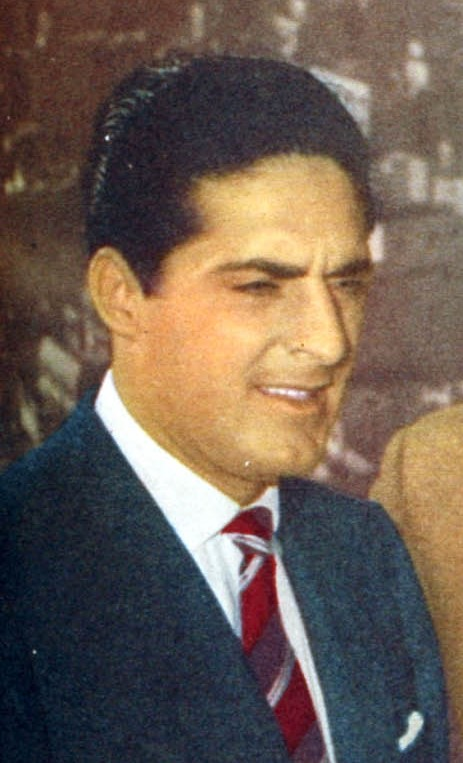
- Rial at El Gráfico in 1958

Personal information
- Full name: José Héctor Rial Laguía
- Date of birth: 14 October 1928
- Place of birth: Pergamino, Argentina
- Date of death: 24 February 1991 (aged 62)
- Place of death: Madrid, Spain
- Position: Forward

Senior career*
Years	Team	Apps	(Gls)
1947–1948	San Lorenzo	40	(20)
1949–1951	Independiente Santa Fe	54	(26)
1952–1954	Nacional	51	(20)
1954–1961	Real Madrid	113	(60)
1961	→ Unión Española (loan)	15	(1)
1961–1962	Espanyol	6	(1)
1962–1963	Marseille	16	(0)

International career
1955–1958	Spain	5	(1)

Managerial career
- 1965: Pontevedra
- 1966: Mallorca
- 1969–1970: Real Zaragoza
- 1970–1971: Las Palmas
- 1971–1972: Spain Olympic
- 1975: Chivas
- 1976: Deportivo La Coruña
- 1978: Estudiantes
- 1980: Elche
- * Club domestic league appearances and goals

José Héctor Rial Laguía (14 October 1928 – 24 February 1991) was a footballer who played as a forward for Real Madrid between 1954 and 1961, and was part of the team that won five consecutive European Cups. He played professional football in Argentina, Colombia, Uruguay, Spain, France and Chile. He was born and raised in Argentina, but represented the Spain national team on five occasions.

Rial started playing professional football in 1947 with San Lorenzo de Almagro in the Primera Division Argentina. In July 1949, he moved to Colombia to play for Independiente Santa Fe. After two seasons with the club, he moved to Uruguay to join Nacional where he was part of the championship-winning side of 1952.

In 1954 Rial joined Spanish giants Real Madrid, where he played for seven years, amassing ten major titles with the team. In his last season playing for the club, mostly as a substitute, he was loaned to play for Unión Española in Chile for five months.

In 1961, Rial left Madrid to join Espanyol in Barcelona, but he left the club after a disappointing season, where the club finished 13th of the 16 teams in La Liga.

Rial's final season was the 1962–63 campaign with the French club Olympique de Marseille, which finished at the bottom of the league, and he retired at the end of the season.

== Career statistics ==
#	Date	Venue	Opponent	Score	Result	Competition
1.	18 May 1955	Santiago Bernabéu, Madrid, Spain	England	1–1	Draw	Friendly
Correct as of 7 October 2015

== Honours ==
Nacional

- Primera División Uruguaya: 1952

Real Madrid

- La Liga: 1955, 1957, 1958, 1961
- European Cup: 1956, 1957, 1958, 1959, 1960
- Intercontinental Cup: 1960
- Latin Cup: 1955, 1957

== See also ==
- List of Spain international footballers born outside Spain
