= 1961–62 Real Madrid CF season =

59th season in existence of Real Madrid CF

Real Madrid CF
1961–62 season
- President: Santiago Bernabéu
- Head coach: Miguel Muñoz
- Stadium: Santiago Bernabéu Stadium
- Primera Division: 1st (in European Cup)
- Copa del Generalísimo: Winners
- European Cup: Runners-up
- Top goalscorer: League: Ferenc Puskás (20); All: Puskás (40)
Home colours	Away colours

The 1961–62 season is Real Madrid Club de Fútbol's 59th season in existence and the club's 30th consecutive season in the top flight of Spanish football.

The season saw Real Madrid win the domestic double and get agonizingly close to clinching its first ever treble (similarly to the 1957–58 season), only to be defeated by Benfica in an exhilarating European Cup final.

By successfully defending the league championship, Madrid secured their 8th Primera División title and equaled Barcelona for most title wins.

== Summary ==
The club won its eight title ever, second in a row. Head coach Miguel Muñoz started the renewal of the squad with Araquistáin as goalkeeper, Pachín reinforcing the defensive line playing along Santamaría, Miera, Isidro, and Pedro Casado. The midfield was covered by Luis Del Sol and Felix Ruiz. Meanwhile, ageing forwards Di Stefano and Puskas were aimed with passes by Gento and Justo Tejada.

Also, the club won the 1962 Copa del Generalísimo Final, defeating Sevilla 2–1 and clinching the club's first domestic double. It was the only Copa del Generalísimo that Alfredo Di Stéfano won in 11 campaigns. The squad reached the 1962 European Cup Final, where it was defeated by Portuguese side and European incumbents Benfica 3–5 (with all Madrid's goals scored by Puskás) thanks to a superb second half, with star forward Eusébio scoring 2 goals. Had Madrid won the European Cup in May, its subsequent triumph in the Copa del Generalísimo would have secured the club its first ever continental treble, something no club had achieved at the time. As of 2022, Real Madrid still has not won a treble.

== Players ==
Note: Flags indicate national team as defined under FIFA eligibility rules; some limited exceptions apply. Players may hold more than one non-FIFA nationality.

No.	Pos.	Nation	Player
—	GK	ESP	Araquistáin
—	GK	ESP	Vicente
—	GK	ARG	Rogelio Domínguez
—	DF	URU	José Santamaría
—	DF	ESP	Pedro Casado
—	DF	ESP	Pachín
—	DF	ESP	Marquitos
—	DF	ESP	Miche
—	DF	ESP	Gento III
—	DF	ESP	Miera
—	DF	ESP	Isidro

No.	Pos.	Nation	Player
—	MF	ESP	Luis Del Sol
—	MF	ESP	José María Vidal
—	MF	ESP	Antonio Ruiz
—	MF	ESP	José María Zárraga
—	MF	ESP	Felo
—	MF	ESP	Félix Ruiz
—	FW	ESP	Francisco Gento
—	FW	HUN	Ferenc Puskás
—	FW	ARG	Alfredo Di Stéfano
—	FW	BRA	Canário
—	FW	ESP	Manuel Bueno
—	FW	ESP	Pepillo
—	FW	ESP	Tejada

=== Transfers ===
In
Pos.	Name	From	Type
GK	Araquistain	Real Sociedad	-
DF	Isidro	Real Betis	-
DF	Vicente Miera	Racing Santander	-
MF	Felix Ruiz	Osasuna	-
FW	Justo Tejada	FC Barcelona	-
FW	Antonio Gento	Plus Ultra	-
FW	Ramon Marsal	Plus Ultra	-
GK	Antonio Betancort	Las Palmas	-

Out
Pos.	Name	To	Type
GK	Juan Alonso	Plus Ultra	-
FW	Agne Simonsson	Real Sociedad	-
FW	Hector Rial	Espanyol	-
FW	Enrique Mateos	Sevilla	-
MF	Santisteban		-
MF	Villa	Real Sociedad	-
GK	Juan Bagur	Racing Santander	-
FW	Ramon Marsal	Plus Ultra	-
DF	Miche	Osasuna	-
FW	Jesus Herrera	Real Sociedad	-

==== Winter ====
In
Pos.	Name	From	Type

Out
Pos.	Name	To	Type
GK	Rogelio Dominguez	River Plate	-

== Competitions ==
=== Overview ===
Competition	First match	Last match	Starting round	Final position	Record							
Competition	First match	Last match	Starting round	Final position	Pld	W	D	L	GF	GA	GD	Win %
La Liga	2 September 1961	1 April 1962	Matchday 1	Winners	30	19	5	6	58	24	+34	63.33
Copa del Rey	14 February 1962	8 July 1962	Round of 32	Winners	9	8	0	1	28	9	+19	88.89
European Cup	6 September 1961	2 May 1962	Preliminary round	Runners-up	10	8	0	2	30	8	+22	80.00
Total					49	35	5	9	116	41	+75	71.43

Source: Competitions

=== La Liga ===
==== League table ====
Pos	Team	Pld	W	D	L	GF	GA	GD	Pts	Qualification or relegation
1	Real Madrid (C)	30	19	5	6	58	24	+34	43	Qualified for the European Cup
2	Barcelona	30	18	4	8	81	46	+35	40	Invited for the Inter-Cities Fairs Cup
3	Atlético Madrid (Note: Atlético Madrid qualified to the Cup Winners' Cup as title holders.)	30	15	6	9	50	36	+14	36	Qualified for the Cup Winners' Cup
4	Zaragoza	30	15	5	10	70	51	+19	35	Invited for the Inter-Cities Fairs Cup
5	Atlético Bilbao	30	12	8	10	52	38	+14	32	

Source: BDFútbol
Rules for classification: 1) Points; 2) Head-to-head results; 3) Goal difference; 4) Number of goals scored
(C) Champions

==== Position by round ====
Round	1	2	3	4	5	6	7	8	9	10	11	12	13	14	15	16	17	18	19	20	21	22	23	24	25	26	27	28	29	30
Ground	H	A	H	A	H	A	A	H	A	H	A	H	A	H	A	A	H	A	H	A	H	H	A	H	A	H	A	H	A	H
Result	W	W	W	W	W	W	W	W	L	W	W	W	W	W	L	D	W	D	W	L	W	D	L	W	L	D	D	W	L	W
Position	3	1	1	1	1	1	1	1	1	1	1	1	1	1	1	1	1	1	1	1	1	1	1	1	1	1	1	1	1	1

Source: www.lfp.es
A = Away; H = Home; W = Win; D = Draw; L = Loss; = Leader, 1962-63 European Cup

==== Matches ====
2 September 1961 1	Real Madrid	3–1	Elche CF	Madrid
	Tejada 1'; Di Stéfano 76'; Puskás 79'	Report	Romero 7'	Stadium: Chamartín; Referee: Gomez Arribas

10 September 1961 2	Racing Santander	0–2	Real Madrid	Santander
		Report	Puskás 42'; Puskás 85'	Stadium: El Sardinero; Referee: Birigay Nieva

16 September 1961 3	Real Madrid	2–1	Sevilla CF	Madrid
	Puskás 8' (pen.); Puskás 38'	Report	Mateos 86' (pen.)	Stadium: Chamartín; Referee: Simó Fiol

24 September 1961 4	Real Sociedad	0–1	Real Madrid	San Sebastián
		Report	Puskás 80'	Stadium: Atocha; Referee: Gardeazabal Garay

30 September 1961 5	Real Madrid	2–0	CF Barcelona	Madrid
	Puskás 14'; Del Sol 72'	Report		Stadium: Chamartín; Referee: Garay

8 October 1961 6	Atletico Bilbao	0–2	Real Madrid	Bilbao
		Report	Di Stéfano 3'; Tejada 63'	Stadium: San Mamés; Referee: Gomez Contreras

12 October 1961	CD Tenerife	0–3	Real Madrid	Santa Cruz de Tenerife
		Report	Di Stéfano 42'; Puskás 80'; Di Stéfano 85'	Stadium: Estadio Heliodoro Rodriguez; Referee: Lopez Zaballa

15 October 1961 8	Real Madrid	2–1	Real Zaragoza	Madrid
	Di Stéfano 57'; Di Stéfano 66'	Report	Duca 80'	Stadium: Chamartín; Referee: Zariquiegui Izco

22 October 1961 9	Real Oviedo	1–0	Real Madrid	Oviedo
	Sánchez Lage 13'	Report		Stadium: Carlos Tartiere; Referee: Simó Fiol

29 October 1961	Real Madrid	2–0	Real Betis	Madrid
	León Lasa 30' (own goal); Gento 81'	Report		Stadium: Chamartín; Referee: Ortiz de Mendibil

1 November 1961 11	Osasuna	1–3	Real Madrid	Pamplona
	Fusté 25' (pen.)	Report	Gento 9'; Tejada 68'; Del Sol 86'	Stadium: San Juan

5 November 1961 12	Real Madrid	3–1	Español	Madrid
	Puskás 2'; Tejada 20'; Tejada 76'	Report	Castaños 45'	Stadium: Chamartín; Referee: Castiñeiras

19 November 1961	Mallorca	0–2	Real Madrid	Palma de Mallorca
		Report	Puskás 2'; Tejada 26'	Stadium: Estadio Luis Sitjar; Referee: Gonzalez Echeverria

26 November 1961 14	Real Madrid	2–1	Atlético Madrid	Madrid
	Gento 40'; Gento 52'	Report	Rodriguez (red card) 33'; Jones 58'	Stadium: Chamartín; Referee: Lacambra Canela

3 December 1961 15	Valencia CF	3–2	Real Madrid	Valencia
	Guillot 10'; Guillot 32'; Ficha 79'	Report	Félix Ruiz 25'; Tejada 75'	Stadium: Estadio Mestalla; Referee: Lopez Zaballa

16	Elche CF	0–0	Real Madrid	Elche
		Report		Stadium: Altabix; Referee: Garay

31 December 1961 17	Real Madrid	6–0	Racing Santander	Madrid
	Puskás 30'; Puskás 33'; Di Stéfano 55'; Tejada 65'; Del Sol 77'; Puskás 87' (pen.)	Report		Stadium: Chamartín; Referee: Saz Olmedo

7 January 1962 18	Sevilla CF	1–1	Real Madrid	Sevilla
	Areta 12'	Report	Puskás 60'	Stadium: Estadio Sanchez Pizjuan; Referee: Gomez Arribas

14 January 1962 19	Real Madrid	1–0	Real Sociedad	Madrid
	Pachín 18'	Report		Stadium: Chamartín; Referee: Gonzalbez

21 January 1962 20	CF Barcelona	3–1	Real Madrid	Barcelona
	Evaristo 4'; Kocsis 40'; Evaristo 83'	Report	Félix Ruiz 86'	Stadium: Estadio del CF Barcelona; Referee: Birigay Nieva

28 January 1962 21	Real Madrid	3–0	Athletic Bilbao	Madrid
	Puskás 56'; Puskás 82'; Di Stéfano 88'	Report		Stadium: Chamartín; Referee: Ruiz Casasola

4 February 1962 22	Real Madrid	0–0	CD Tenerife	Madrid
		Report		Stadium: Chamartín; Referee: Gonzalez Echeverria

11 February 1962 23	Real Zaragoza	2–1	Real Madrid	Zaragoza
	Seminario 63' (pen.); Murillo 89'	Report	Pepillo 66'	Stadium: La Romareda; Referee: Saz Olmedo

18 February 1962 24	Real Madrid	4–1	Real Oviedo	Madrid
	Puskás 22'; Gento 37'; Gento 38'; Pachin 45'; Luis Del Sol 60'; Di Stéfano 68'	Report	Sánchez Lage 89'	Stadium: Chamartín; Referee: Birigay Nieva

25 February 1962 25	Real Betis	2–1	Real Madrid	Sevilla
	Bosch 26' (pen.); Luis Aragonés 29'	Report	Félix Ruiz 15'	Stadium: Estadio Benito Villamarin; Referee: Lopez Zaballa

4 March 1962 26	Real Madrid	2–2	Osasuna	Madrid
	Di Stéfano 31'; Puskás 36'	Report	Chechu 48'; Silvestre 61'	Stadium: Estadio Santiago Bernabéu; Referee: Ruiz Casasola

11 March 1962 27	Español	1–1	Real Madrid	Barcelona
	Indio 39'	Report	Bueno 33'	Stadium: Sarrià; Referee: Cozar Sanchez

18 March 1962 28	Real Madrid	2–0	Mallorca	Madrid
	Di Stéfano 2'; Luis Del Sol 78'	Report	Arqué (red card) 73'	Stadium: Chamartín; Referee: Birigay Nieva

25 March 1962 29	Atlético Madrid	1–0	Real Madrid	Madrid
	Gasca 21'	Report		Stadium: Metropolitano; Referee: Cozar Sanchez

1 April 1962 30	Real Madrid	4–1	Valencia CF	Madrid
	Del Sol 10'; Puskás 26'; Puskás 34'; Tejada 69'	Report	Ribelles 86' (pen.)	Stadium: Chamartín; Referee: Cozar Sanchez

=== Copa del Rey ===
==== Round of 32 ====
31 January 1962 First leg	San Sebastián CF	1–3	Real Madrid	San Sebastián

28 March 1962 Second leg	Real Madrid	5–0 (8–1 agg.)	San Sebastián CF	Madrid
				Stadium: Estadio Chamartín

==== Round of 16 ====
5 April 1962 First leg	Elche CF	3–4	Real Madrid	Elche
				Stadium: Campo de Altabix

8 April 1962 Second leg	Real Madrid	5–1 (9–4 agg.)	Elche CF	Madrid
				Stadium: Estadio Chamartín

==== Quarter-finals ====
15 April 1962 First leg	Real Madrid	0–1	FC Barcelona	Madrid
				Stadium: Estadio Chamartín

22 April 1962 Second leg	FC Barcelona	1–3 (2–3 agg.)	Real Madrid	Barcelona
				Stadium: Camp Nou

==== Semi-finals ====
24 June 1962 First leg	Real Zaragoza	1–2	Real Madrid	Zaragoza
				Stadium: La Romareda

1 July 1962 Second leg	Real Madrid	4–1 (6–2 agg.)	Real Zaragoza	Madrid
				Stadium: Estadio Chamartín

===== Final =====
8 July 1962 Final	Real Madrid	2–1	Sevilla FC	Madrid
20:30 (UTC +2)	Puskás (76 (p.)), 90'	Report (in Spanish)	Diéguez 47'	Stadium: Estadio Chamartín; Attendance: 90,000; Referee: José Castiñeira

=== European Cup ===
==== Preliminary round ====
6 September 1961 First leg	Vasas (Hungary)	0–2	(Spain) Real Madrid	Budapest, Hungary
		Report	Tejada 6', 26'	Stadium: Népstadion; Attendance: 90,000; Referee: Marcel Bois (France)

20 September 1961 Second leg	Real Madrid (Spain)	3–1 (5–1 agg.)	(Hungary) Vasas	Madrid, Spain
	Di Stéfano 12', 57'; Tejada 90'	Report	Pál I 10'	Stadium: Santiago Bernabéu Stadium; Attendance: 70,000; Referee: Maurice Guigue (France)

==== First round ====
18 October 1961 First leg	Boldklubben 1913 (Denmark)	0–3	(Spain) Real Madrid	Odense, Denmark
		Report	Puskás 15', 84'; Tejada 86'	Stadium: Odense Stadion, Attendance: 27,587; Referee: Lucien Van Nuffel (Belgium)

25 October 1961 Second leg	Real Madrid (Spain)	9–0 (12–0 agg.)	(Denmark) Boldklubben 1913	Madrid, Spain
	Puskás 8'; Del Sol 25', 30'; Di Stéfano 35', 42', 73'; Gento 55', 57'; Isidro Sánchez 89'	Report		Stadium: Santiago Bernabéu Stadium; Attendance: 54,000; Referee: Lucien Van Nuffel (Belgium)

==== Quarter-finals ====
14 February 1962 First leg	Juventus (Italy)	0–1	(Spain) Real Madrid	Turin, Italy
		Report	Di Stéfano 69'	Stadium: Stadio Comunale; Attendance: 66,403; Referee: Albert Dusch (West Germany)

21 February 1962 Second leg	Real Madrid (Spain)	0–1 (1–1 agg.)	(Italy) Juventus	Madrid, Spain
		Report	Sívori 39'	Stadium: Santiago Bernabéu Stadium; Attendance: 130,000; Referee: Maurice Guigue (France)

28 February 1962 Playoff	Real Madrid (Spain)	3–1	(Italy) Juventus	Paris, France
	Felo 1'; Del Sol 65'; Tejada 83'	Report	Sívori 35'	Stadium: Parc des Princes; Attendance: 36,750; Referee: Pierre Schwinte (France)

==== Semi-finals ====
22 March 1962 First leg	Real Madrid (Spain)	4–0	(Belgium) Standard Liège	Madrid, Spain
	Di Stéfano 23'; Tejada 38', 78'; Casado 48'	Report		Stadium: Santiago Bernabéu Stadium; Attendance: 110,000; Referee: Joseph Barbéran (France)

12 April 1962 Second leg	Standard Liège (Belgium)	0–2 (6–0 agg.)	(Spain) Real Madrid	Liège, Belgium
		Report	Puskás 50'; Del Sol 60'	Stadium: Stade Maurice Dufrasne; Attendance: 35,000; Referee: Gerhard Schulenburg (West Germany)

==== Final ====
2 May 1962 Final	Benfica (Portugal)	5–3	(Spain) Real Madrid	Amsterdam, Netherlands
19:30 CEST	Águas 25'; Cavém 33'; Coluna 51'; Eusébio 64' (pen.), 69'	Report	Puskás 18', 23', 39'	Stadium: Olympisch Stadion; Attendance: 61,257; Referee: Leo Horn (Netherlands)

== Statistics ==
=== Players statistics ===
No.	Pos	Nat	Player	Total		Primera Division		Copa del Generalísimo		European Cup	
No.	Pos	Nat	Player	Apps	Goals	Apps	Goals	Apps	Goals	Apps	Goals
	GK	(Spain) ESP	Araquistáin	42	-36	25	-19	8	-10	9	-7
	DF	(Spain) ESP	Isidro	32	1	19	0	8	0	5	1
	DF	(Uruguay) URU	Santamaria	45	0	26	0	9	0	10	0
	DF	(Spain) ESP	Miera	41	0	25	0	7	0	9	0
	DF	(Spain) ESP	Pachín	39	1	26	1	6	0	7	0
	MF	(Spain) ESP	Del Sol	44	10	26	5	8	1	10	4
	MF	(Spain) ESP	Casado	28	1	17	0	4	0	7	1
	MF	(Spain) ESP	Gento	44	12	25	6	9	4	10	2
	FW	(Spain) ESP	Tejada	40	20	24	9	8	4	8	7
	FW	(Hungary) HUN	Puskas	40	40	23	20	8	13	9	7
	FW	(Argentina) ARG	Di Stefano	41	22	23	11	8	4	10	7
	GK	(Spain) ESP	Vicente	5	-5	3	-4	1	0	1	-1
	GK	(Argentina) ARG	Dominguez	3	-2	2	-1	0	0	1	-1
	DF	(Spain) ESP	Marquitos	10	0	5	0	5	0		
	MF	(Spain) ESP	Ruiz	22	4	17	3	2	1	3	0
	MF	(Spain) ESP	Vidal	12	0	9	0	1	0	2	0
	MF	(Spain) ESP	Ruiz	17	0	10	0	3	0	4	0
	MF	(Spain) ESP	Zarraga	2	0	2	0				
	FW	(Brazil) BRA	Canário	6	0	5	0	0	0	1	0
	FW	(Spain) ESP	Bueno	4	1	4	1				
	FW	(Spain) ESP	Pepillo	7	2	5	1	2	1		
	MF	(Spain) ESP	Felo	9	0	7	0	2	0		
	DF	(Spain) ESP	Gento III	3	0	3	0				

- Source: http://www.bdfutbol.com/en/t/t1961-622.html
