= 1962–63 Real Madrid CF season =

60th season in existence of Real Madrid CF

Real Madrid CF
1962–63 season
- President: Santiago Bernabéu
- Head coach: Miguel Muñoz
- Stadium: Chamartín
- Primera Division: 1st (in European Cup)
- Copa del Generalísimo: Semi-finals
- European Cup: Round of 32
- Top goalscorer: Ferenc Puskás (26)
Home colours	Away colours

The 1962–63 season was Real Madrid Club de Fútbol's 60th season in existence and the club's 31st consecutive season in the top flight of Spanish football.

Real Madrid secured a record 9th Primera División title surpassing Barcelona for most league title wins. The club also became the first to win three consecutive league titles.

== Summary ==
Owing to a disappointing performance of Spain in the 1962 FIFA World Cup, the Spanish Federation imposed a ban on the transfers of foreign players, with the measure lasting 11 years until 1973 with oriundo players exemptions. During the summer midfielder Luis Del Sol was sold to Juventus. The club transferred in defender Ignacio Zoco from Osasuna an arrival to reinforce the back-up line. The transitional stage in the club continued with new arrivals such as right winger Amancio Amaro Nicknamed 'The Wizard' from Deportivo La Coruña French midfielder Lucien Muller (Di Stefano saw him during a Spain-France match and asked him to play in Real Madrid) slovak Yanko Daucik and FC Barcelona Brazilian forward Evaristo de Macedo.

The club repeated defended its La Liga title from the previous season, its ninth overall, also marking Real Madrid's first ever three-peat. The team finished 12 points above runners-up Atlético Madrid. In the Copa del Generalísimo, the squad reached the semi-finals where it was defeated by Zaragoza. In the European Cup, Madrid was eliminated in the preliminary round, surprisingly losing to Belgian squad RSC Anderlecht. Additionally, 36-years-old forward Ferenc Puskás again won the individual League top-scorer trophy with 26 goals.

== Players ==
Note: Flags indicate national team as defined under FIFA eligibility rules; some limited exceptions apply. Players may hold more than one non-FIFA nationality.

No.	Pos.	Nation	Player
—	GK	ESP	Vicente
—	GK	ESP	Fermín
—	DF	URU	José Santamaría
—	DF	ESP	Pedro Casado
—	DF	ESP	Pachín
—	DF	ESP	Marquitos
—	DF	ESP	Ignacio Zoco
—	DF	ESP	Isidro
—	DF	ESP	Miera
—	MF	ESP	Félix Ruiz
—	MF	ESP	Felo

No.	Pos.	Nation	Player
—	MF	ESP	Antonio Ruiz
—	MF	FRA	Lucien Muller
—	FW	ESP	Amancio
—	FW	ESP	Francisco Gento
—	FW	HUN	Ferenc Puskás
—	FW	ARG	Alfredo Di Stéfano
—	FW	BRA	Evaristo de Macedo
—	FW	ESP	Manuel Bueno
—	FW	ESP	Pepillo
—	FW	ESP	Tejada
—	FW	TCH	Yanko Daucik

=== Transfers ===
In
Pos.	Name	From	Type
MF	Lucien Muller	Stade de Reims -	-
FW	Amancio Amaro	Deportivo La Coruña	-
DF	Ignacio Zoco	Osasuna	-
FW	Evaristo de Macedo	FC Barcelona	-
GK	Fermin	Oviedo	-
FW	Yanko	Real Betis	-
MF	Villa	Real Sociedad	-
GK	Moncho	Deportivo	-

Out
Pos.	Name	To	Type
MF	Luis Del Sol	Juventus	-
MF	Antonio Ruiz	Deportivo	-
FW	Canario	Sevilla	-
FW	Antonio Gento	Levante	-
MF	Zarraga	-	-
GK	Juan Bagur	-	-
FW	Ramon Marsal	Murcia	-
DF	Miche	Deportivo	-
GK	Betancort	Deportivo	-
FW	Jesus Herrera	-	-
DF	Marcos Alonso Imaz Marquitos	Hercules	-
FW	Pepillo	Mallorca	-
MF	Vidal	Malaga	-
MF	Villa	Zaragoza	-

== Competitions ==
=== La Liga ===
==== League table ====
Pos	Team	Pld	W	D	L	GF	GA	GD	Pts	Qualification or relegation
1	Real Madrid (C)	30	23	3	4	83	33	+50	49	Qualification for the European Cup preliminary round
2	Atlético Madrid	30	14	9	7	61	36	+25	37	Invited for the Inter-Cities Fairs Cup
3	Oviedo	30	15	3	12	52	46	+6	33	
4	Valladolid	30	15	3	12	51	53	−2	33	
5	Zaragoza	30	14	4	12	54	39	+15	32	Invited for the Inter-Cities Fairs Cup

Source: BDFútbol
Rules for classification: 1) Points; 2) Head-to-head results; 3) Goal difference; 4) Number of goals scored
(C) Champions

==== Position by round ====
Round	1	2	3	4	5	6	7	8	9	10	11	12	13	14	15	16	17	18	19	20	21	22	23	24	25	26	27	28	29	30
Ground	A	H	H	A	H	A	H	A	H	A	H	A	H	A	H	H	A	A	H	A	H	A	H	A	H	A	H	A	H	A
Result	W	W	W	W	W	L	W	L	W	D	W	D	W	L	W	W	W	W	W	W	W	W	W	W	W	L	W	D	W	W
Position	4	2	1	1	1	1	1	1	1	1	1	1	1	1	1	1	1	1	1	1	1	1	1	1	1	1	1	1	1	1

Source: www.lfp.es
A = Away; H = Home; W = Win; D = Draw; L = Loss; = Leader, 1963-64 European Cup

==== Matches ====
16 September 1962 1	Real Betis	2–5	Real Madrid	Sevilla
	Ansola 3'; Senekowitsch 38'	Report	Yanko 19'; Puskás 45'; Puskás 46'; Amancio 55'; Puskás 62'; Araquistáin 73'	Stadium: Estadio Benito Villamarin; Referee: Gomez Arribas

22 September 1962 2	Real Madrid	2–1	Deportivo La Coruña	Madrid
	Di Stéfano 62'; Pachín 69'	Report	Ruiz 31'	Stadium: Chamartín; Referee: Bueno Perales

30 September 1962 3	Real Madrid	2–0	CF Barcelona	Madrid
	Di Stéfano 20'; Di Stéfano 70'	Report		Stadium: Chamartín; Referee: Gardeazabal Garay

7 October 1962 4	CD Málaga	0–4	Real Madrid	Málaga
		Report	Di Stéfano 9'; Puskás 19'; Gento 47'; Zoco 82'	Referee: Simó Fiol

14 October 1962 5	Real Madrid	6–1	Elche CF	Madrid
	Amancio 5'; Muller 11'; Di Stéfano 29'; Di Stéfano 49'; Di Stéfano 57'; Amancio 64'	Report	Eulogio Martínez 78'	Stadium: Chamartín; Referee: Ortiz de Mendibil

21 October 1962 6	Real Valladolid	4–2	Real Madrid	Valladolid
	Endériz 47'; Rodilla 65'; Molina 75'; Rodilla 89'	Report	Puskás 45'; Puskás 52'	Stadium: Municipal de Zorrilla; Referee: Gonzalez Echeverria

28 October 1962 7	Real Madrid	2–1	Real Oviedo	Madrid
	Félix Ruiz 39'; Gento 52'	Report	Girón 78'	Stadium: Chamartín; Referee: Cozar Sanchez

4 November 1962 8	Valencia CF	2–1	Real Madrid	Valencia
	Chicao 5'; Ribelles 65' (pen.)	Report	Gento 15'	Stadium: Estadio Mestalla; Referee: Ortiz de Mendibil

11 November 1962 9	Real Madrid	2–1	Sevilla CF	Madrid
	Puskás 28'; Evaristo 74'	Report	Areta 34'	Stadium: Chamartín; Referee: Birigay Nieva

18 November 1962 10	Atlético Madrid	1–1	Real Madrid	Madrid
	Collar 78'	Report	Amancio 83'	Stadium: Metropolitano; Referee: Gomez Arribas

9 December 1962 11	Real Madrid	4–2	Real Zaragoza	Madrid
	Muller 2'; Zubiaurre 50' (own goal); Félix Ruiz 78'; Félix Ruiz 86'	Report	Sigi 4'; Miguel (red card) 69'; Cortizo 84'	Stadium: Chamartín; Referee: Lloris Antonino

16 December 1962 12	Córdoba CF	1–1	Real Madrid	Córdoba
	Homar 7'	Report	Felix Ruiz 29'	Stadium: El Arcangel; Referee: Gonzalez Echeverria

23 December 1962 13	Real Madrid	5–0	Osasuna	Madrid
	Félix Ruiz 51'; Puskás 57' (pen.); Amancio 74'; Amancio 75'; Tejada 89'	Report		Stadium: Chamartín; Referee: Ruiz Casasola

30 December 1962 14	Mallorca	5–2	Real Madrid	Palma de Mallorca
	Sampedro 8' (pen.); Achuri 24'; Pepillo 32'; Pepillo 74'; Bergara II 89'	Report	Puskás 40'; Amancio 87'	Stadium: Estadio Lluis Sitjar; Referee: Pintado Viu

6 January 1963 15	Real Madrid	3–2	Atletico de Bilbao	Madrid
	Di Stéfano 18'; Di Stéfano 47'; Gento 72'	Report	Argoitia 32'; Argoitia 88'	Stadium: Chamartín; Referee: Bueno Perales

13 January 1963 16	Real Madrid	3–0	Real Betis	Madrid
	Amancio 36'; Puskás 43'; Puskás 68'	Report		Stadium: Chamartín; Referee: Gomez Contreras

20 January 1963 17	Deportivo La Coruña	1–3	Real Madrid	La Coruña
	Loureda 59'	Report	Félix Ruiz 43'; Di Stéfano 57'; Amancio 64'	Stadium: Nuevo Riazor; Referee: Martín Álvarez

27 January 1963 18	CF Barcelona	1–5	Real Madrid	Barcelona
	Cayetano Ré 34'	Report	Puskás 24' (pen.); Puskás 35'; Di Stéfano 47'; Gento 67'; Puskás 71'	Stadium: Estadio del CF Barcelona; Referee: Gardeazabal Garay

3 February 1963 19	Real Madrid	5–0	CD Málaga	Madrid
	Puskás 6'; Amancio 53'; Gento 56'; Di Stéfano 61'; Félix Ruiz 83'	Report		Stadium: Chamartín; Referee: Cerezuela Ruiz

10 February 1963 20	Elche CF	0–2	Real Madrid	Elche
		Report	Puskás; 69'; Amancio 76'	Stadium: Alatabix; Referee: Ortiz de Mendibil

17 February 1963 21	Real Madrid	4–1	Real Valladolid	Madrid
	Félix Ruiz 22'; Félix Ruiz 57'; Amancio 69'; Gento 74'	Report	Morollón 39'	Stadium: Chamartín; Referee: Segrelles del Pilar

24 February 1963 22	Real Oviedo	0–1	Real Madrid	Oviedo
		Report	Puskás 67'	Referee: Gomez Arribas

3 March 1963 23	Real Madrid	1–0	Valencia CF	Madrid
	Félix Ruiz 78'	Report		Stadium: Chamartín; Referee: Lopez Zaballa

10 March 1963 24	Sevilla CF	0–5	Real Madrid	Sevilla
		Report	Amancio 56'; Puskás 63'; Puskás 69'; Yanko 83'; Félix Ruiz 89'	Stadium: Estadio Sanchez Pizjuan; Referee: Gonzalez Echeverria

17 March 1963 25	Real Madrid	4–3	Atlético Madrid	Madrid
	Puskás 2'; Puskás 50'; Amancio 79'; Félix Ruiz 85'	Report	Casado 4' (pen.); Mendonça 41'; Collar 51'	Stadium: Chamartín; Referee: Saz Olmedo

24 March 1963 26	Real Zaragoza	1–0	Real Madrid	Zaragoza
	Sigi 42'	Report		Stadium: La Romareda; Referee: Simó Fiol

31 March 1963 27	Real Madrid	1–0	Córdoba CF	Madrid
	Puskás 32'	Report		Stadium: Estadio Santiago Bernabéu; Referee: De Luis Quel

7 April 1963 28	Osasuna	1–1	Real Madrid	Pamplona
	Hormaeche 84'; Carlos (red card) 63'	Report	Puskás 59'	Stadium: San Juan; Referee: Bueno Perales

14 April 1963 29	Real Madrid	5–2	Mallorca	Madrid
	Félix Ruiz 41'; Puskás 45' (pen.); Evaristo 50'; Puskás 79'; Evaristo 85'	Report	Mir 67'; Sampedro 68'	Stadium: Chamartín; Referee: Zariquiegui Izco

21 April 1963 30	Athletic Bilbao	0–1	Real Madrid	Madrid
		Report	Puskás 52' (pen.)	Stadium: Estadio San Mames; Referee: Prendes Bernardo

=== Copa del Generalísimo ===
==== Round of 32 ====
28 April 1963	Granada CF	0–3	Real Madrid	Granada
		Report

4 May 1963	Real Madrid	3–0	Granada CF	Madrid
		Report		Stadium: Estadio Chamartín

==== Eightfinals ====
12 May 1963	Levante	1–4	Real Madrid
		Report

19 May 1963	Real Madrid	3–1	Levante	Madrid
		Report		Stadium: Estadio Chamartín

==== Quarter-finals ====
26 May 1963	Real Betis	1–0	Real Madrid	Sevilla
		Report		Stadium: Estadio Benito Villamarín

2 June 1963	Real Madrid	3–2	Real Betis	Madrid
		Report		Stadium: Chamartín

5 June 1963 tie-breaker	Real Madrid	2–0	Real Betis	Valencia
	Di Stéfano 56'; Puskás 59'	Report		Stadium: Estadio Mestalla

==== Semi-finals ====
9 June 1963	Real Zaragoza	4–0	Real Madrid	Zaragoza
		Report		Stadium: La Romareda

16 June 1963	Real Madrid	3–0	Real Zaragoza	Madrid
		Report		Stadium: Estadio Chamartín

=== European Cup ===
==== Preliminary round ====
5 September 1962	Real Madrid (Spain)	3–3	(Belgium) Anderlecht	Madrid
	Zoco 14'; Gento 30'; Di Stéfano 48'	Report	Van Himst 37'; Janssens 42'; Stockman 80'	Stadium: Santiago Bernabéu Stadium, Attendance: 90,000; Referee: (France) Pierre Schwinte

26 September 1962	Anderlecht (Belgium)	1–0	(Spain) Real Madrid	Brussels
	Jurion 85'	Report		Stadium: Heysel Stadium, Attendance: 64,694; Referee: (France) Marcel Bois

== Statistics ==
=== Squad statistics ===
Competition	First match	Last match	Starting round	Final position	Record							
Competition	First match	Last match	Starting round	Final position	Pld	W	D	L	GF	GA	GD	Win %
La Liga	2 September 1962	1 April 1963	Matchday 1	Winners	30	23	3	4	83	33	+50	76.67
1962–63 Copa del Generalísimo	14 February 1963	8 July 1963	Round of 32	Semi-finals	9	8	0	1	28	9	+19	88.89
European Cup	5 September 1962	26 September 1962	Preliminary round	Preliminary round	2	0	1	1	3	4	−1	0.00
Total					41	31	4	6	114	46	+68	75.61

Last updated: 22 September 2019
Source: Competitions

=== Players statistics ===
No.	Pos	Nat	Player	Total		Primera Division		Copa del Generalisimo		European Cup	
No.	Pos	Nat	Player	Apps	Goals	Apps	Goals	Apps	Goals	Apps	Goals
	GK	(Spain) ESP	Vicente	35	-35	28	-26	6	-8	1	-1
	DF	(Spain) ESP	Isidro	33	0	24	0	9	0		
	DF	(Uruguay) URU	Santamaria	40	0	29	0	9	0	2	0
	DF	(Spain) ESP	Casado	30	0	22	0	6	0	2	0
	DF	(Spain) ESP	Pachín	36	1	28	1	7	0	1	0
	MF	(Spain) ESP	Ruiz	29	14	23	13	6	1		
	MF	(France) FRA	Muller	28	2	26	2	0	0	2	0
	MF	(Spain) ESP	Gento	31	9	25	7	4	1	2	1
	FW	(Spain) ESP	Amancio	38	15	28	14	8	1	2	0
	FW	(Hungary) HUN	Puskas	39	30	30	26	7	4	2	0
	FW	(Argentina) ARG	Di Stefano	24	22	13	12	9	9	2	1
	GK	(Spain) ESP	Araquistáin	7	-11	3	-7	3	-1	1	-3
	GK	(Spain) ESP	Fermín	0	0	0	0				
	DF	(Spain) ESP	Marquitos	5	0	5	0				
	DF	(Spain) ESP	Zoco	24	3	13	1	9	1	2	1
	MF	(Spain) ESP	Ruiz	10	0	10	0				
	FW	(Brazil) BRA	Evaristo	7	3	7	3				
	FW	(Spain) ESP	Bueno	11	2	5	0	5	2	1	0
	FW	(Spain) ESP	Pepillo	5	1	5	1				
	DF	(Spain) ESP	Miera	12	0	8	0	3	0	1	0
	FW	(Spain) ESP	Tejada	11	2	9	1	2	1		
	MF	(Spain) ESP	Felo	7	0	3	0	3	0	1	0
	FW	(Czechoslovakia) TCH	Yanko	10	3	7	2	3	1		

- Source: https://www.bdfutbol.com/en/t/t1962-632.html
