= 1962 European Cup final =

- Match programme cover
- Event: 1961–62 European Cup
Benfica	Real Madrid
(Portugal)	(Spain)
5	3
- Date: 2 May 1962
- Venue: Olympisch Stadion, Amsterdam
- Referee: Leo Horn (Netherlands)
- Attendance: 61,257

The 1962 European Cup final was a football match played at the Olympisch Stadion in Amsterdam, Netherlands on 2 May 1962 as the conclusion to the 1961–62 European Cup.

The match was contested by the only two teams to have previously won the trophy – defending champions Benfica of Portugal and five-time winners Real Madrid of Spain.

Benfica won the match 5–3 as they successfully defended their title. Ferenc Puskás became the first player to score a hat-trick in multiple European Cup finals after scoring four goals in the 1960 final and the first to score a hat-trick in a European Cup final for the losing side.

== Background ==
Benfica had only taken part in the European Cup twice before – in 1957–58 when they lost to Sevilla in the preliminary round and in 1960–61 when they defeated Barcelona 3–2 in the final.

Real Madrid had won the first five editions of the European Cup in 1956, 1957, 1958, 1959 and 1960. In the first round in 1960–61 as five-time defending champions, Real Madrid lost 4–3 on aggregate to Barcelona.

== Route to the final ==
(Portugal) Benfica				Round	(Spain) Real Madrid			
Opponent	Agg.	1st leg	2nd leg		Opponent	Agg.	1st leg	2nd leg
Bye				Prelim. round	(Hungary) Vasas SC	5–1	2–0 (A)	3–1 (H)
Austria Wien	6–2	1–1 (A)	5–1 (H)	First round	(Denmark) Boldklubben 1913	12–0	3–0 (A)	9–0 (H)
(West Germany) 1. FC Nürnberg	7–3	1–3 (A)	6–0 (H)	Quarter-finals	(Italy) Juventus	1–1 (Replay: 3–1)	1–0 (A)	0–1 (H)
(England) Tottenham Hotspur	4–3	3–1 (H)	1–2 (A)	Semi-finals	(Belgium) Standard Liège	6–0	4–0 (H)	2–0 (A)

=== Benfica ===
Benfica qualified for the competition as defending champions and they were given a bye in the preliminary round.

In the first round, Benfica faced Austria Wien of Austria. After a 1–1 draw in the first leg away from home, Benfica won the second leg 5–1 at home to advance 6–2 on aggregate.

Benfica then faced 1. FC Nürnberg of West Germany in the quarter-finals. After losing the first leg 3–1 away from home, Benfica won the second leg at home 6–0 to advance to the semi-finals 7–3 on aggregate.

In the semi-finals, Benfica faced Tottenham Hotspur of England. After winning the first leg 3–1 at home, Benfica lost the second leg 2–1 away from home to advance to the final 4–3 on aggregate.

=== Real Madrid ===
Real Madrid qualified for the competition as winners of the 1960–61 La Liga.

In the preliminary round, Real Madrid defeated Vasas of Hungary 2–0 away in the first leg and 3–1 at home in the second leg to advance 5–1 on aggregate.

Boldklubben 1913 of Denmark were Real Madrid's opponents in the first round. After winning the first leg 3–0 away from home, Real Madrid won the second leg at home 9–0 to advance 12–0 on aggregate.

Real Madrid then faced Juventus of Italy in the quarter-finals. After winning the first leg 1–0 at home, Real Madrid lost the second leg away from home by the same scoreline which resulted in a tie, 1–1 on aggregate. As a result, a replay was held at a neutral venue in Paris which Real Madrid won 3–1 to advance to the semi-final.

In the semi-finals, Real Madrid defeated Standard Liège of Belgium 4–0 in the first leg at home and 2–0 in the second leg away from home to advance to the final 6–0 on aggregate.

== Match ==
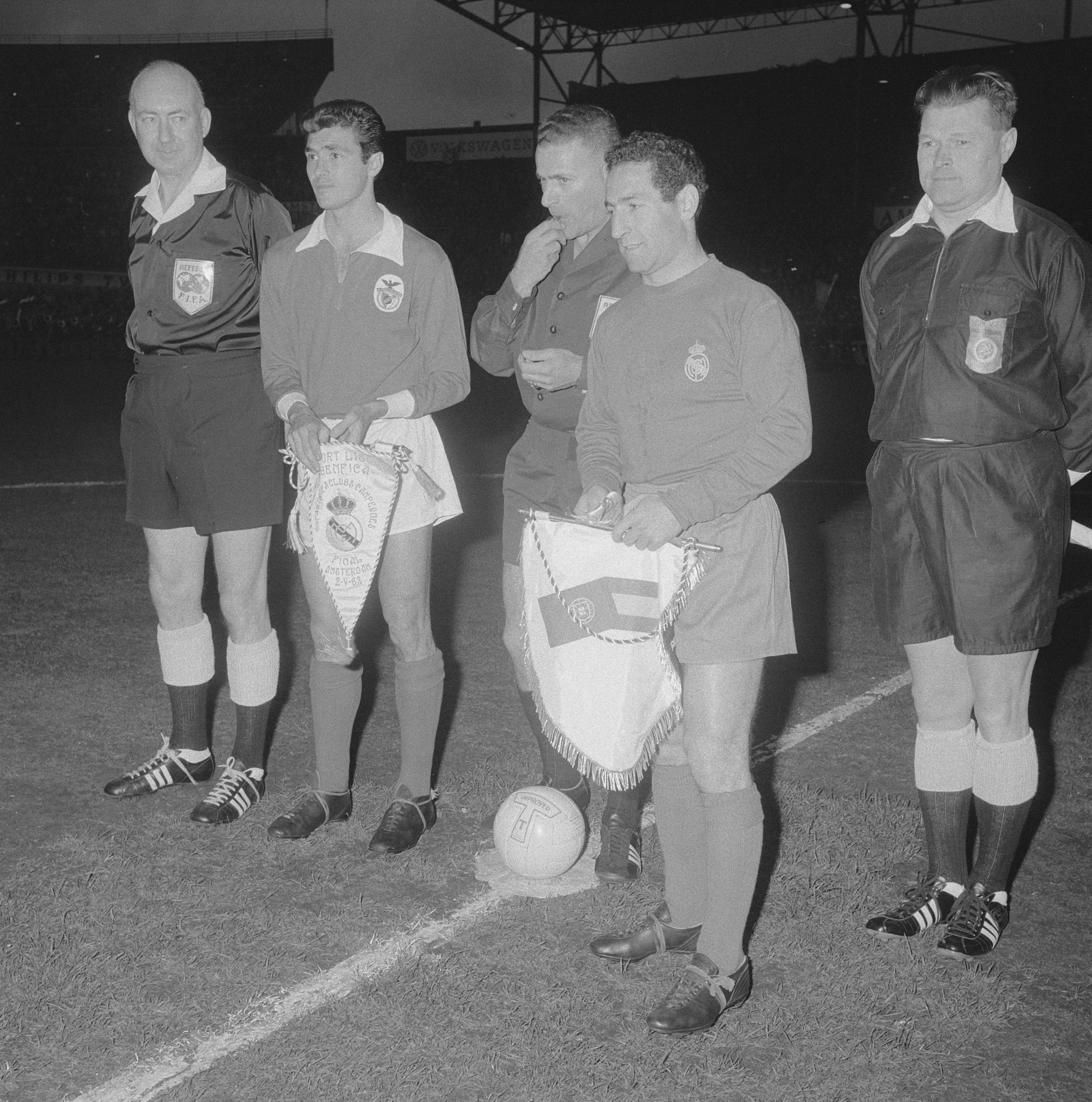
The referees, and captains José Águas and Francisco "Paco" Gento before kick-off

=== Details ===
2 May 1962
19:30 CEST

Benfica (Portugal)	5–3	(Spain) Real Madrid
Águas 25'; Cavém 33'; Coluna 50'; Eusébio 64' (pen.), 67'	Report	Puskás 18', 23', 39'

Olympisch Stadion, Amsterdam
Attendance: 61,257
Referee: Leo Horn (Netherlands)

Benfica	Real Madrid

GK	1	(Portugal) Costa Pereira
RB	2	(Portugal) Mário João
CB	3	(Portugal) Germano
LB	4	(Portugal) Ângelo Martins
RH	5	(Portugal) Domiciano Cavém
LH	6	(Portugal) Fernando Cruz
OR	7	(Portugal) José Augusto
IR	8	(Portugal) Eusébio
CF	9	(Portugal) José Águas (c)
IL	10	(Portugal) Mário Coluna
OL	11	(Portugal) António Simões
Manager:
(Hungary) Béla Guttmann

GK	1	(Spain) José Araquistáin
RB	2	(Spain) Pedro Casado
CB	5	(Spain) José Santamaría (Note: Although Santamaría had amassed 20 caps for his native Uruguay from 1952 to 1957, he had been representing Spain in international play since 1958.)
LB	3	(Spain) Vicente Miera
RH	4	(Spain) Felo
LH	6	(Spain) Pachín
OR	7	(Spain) Justo Tejada
IR	8	(Spain) Luis del Sol
CF	9	(Spain) Alfredo Di Stéfano (Note: Di Stéfano, a native Argentine, had represented both Argentina and Colombia earlier in his international career. He became a naturalised citizen of Spain in 1956, and began playing for the Spain national football team in 1957.)
IL	10	(Spain) Ferenc Puskás (Note: Though more famous for representing his native Hungary in international play during the 1950s, Puskás became a naturalised a citizen of Spain in 1962. He appeared in four matches for Spain during his time at Real Madrid and was named in Spain's squad at the 1962 FIFA World Cup.)
OL	11	(Spain) Paco Gento (c)
Manager:
(Spain) Miguel Muñoz

== See also ==
- 1961–62 S.L. Benfica season
- 1961–62 Real Madrid CF season
- 1962 European Cup Winners' Cup final
- 1962 Inter-Cities Fairs Cup final
- 1962 Intercontinental Cup
- S.L. Benfica in international football
- Real Madrid CF in international football
