= 1962 Copa del Generalísimo final =

- Event: 1961–62 Copa del Generalísimo
Real Madrid	Sevilla
2	1
- Date: 8 July 1962
- Venue: Santiago Bernabéu, Madrid
- Referee: José Castiñeira
- Attendance: 90,000

The 1962 Copa del Generalísimo final was the 60th final of the Copa del Rey. The final was played at Santiago Bernabéu Stadium in Madrid, on 8 July 1962, being won by Real Madrid, who beat Sevilla 2–1.

== Match details ==
8 July 1962
20:30 CET

Real Madrid	2–1	Sevilla
Puskás 76' (pen.), 90'	Report	Diéguez 47'

Santiago Bernabéu Stadium, Madrid
Attendance: 90,000
Referee: José Castiñeira

Real Madrid

Sevilla

GK	1	(Spain) José Araquistáin
DF	2	(Spain) Marquitos
DF	3	(Uruguay) José Emilio Santamaría
DF	4	(Spain) Vicente Miera
MF	5	(Spain) Isidro
MF	6	(Spain) Pachín
FW	7	(Spain) Justo Tejada
FW	8	(Spain) Luis del Sol
FW	9	(Argentina) Alfredo Di Stéfano
FW	10	(Hungary) Ferenc Puskás
FW	11	(Spain) Francisco Gento (c)
Manager:
(Spain) Miguel Muñoz

GK	1	(Spain) Salvador Mut (c)
DF	2	(Spain) Juan Manuel Tartilán
DF	3	(Spain) Marcelino Campanal
DF	4	(Spain) José Luque
MF	5	(Spain) Manuel Ruiz Sosa
MF	6	(Paraguay) Ignacio Achúcarro
FW	7	(Spain) Enrique Mateos
FW	8	(Spain) José Manuel Moya
FW	9	(Spain) José Luis Areta
FW	10	(Argentina) José Carlos Diéguez
FW	11	(Paraguay) Juan Bautista Agüero
Manager:
(Spain) Antonio Barrios
