= Luis (footballer) =

Spanish footballer (1946–2024)

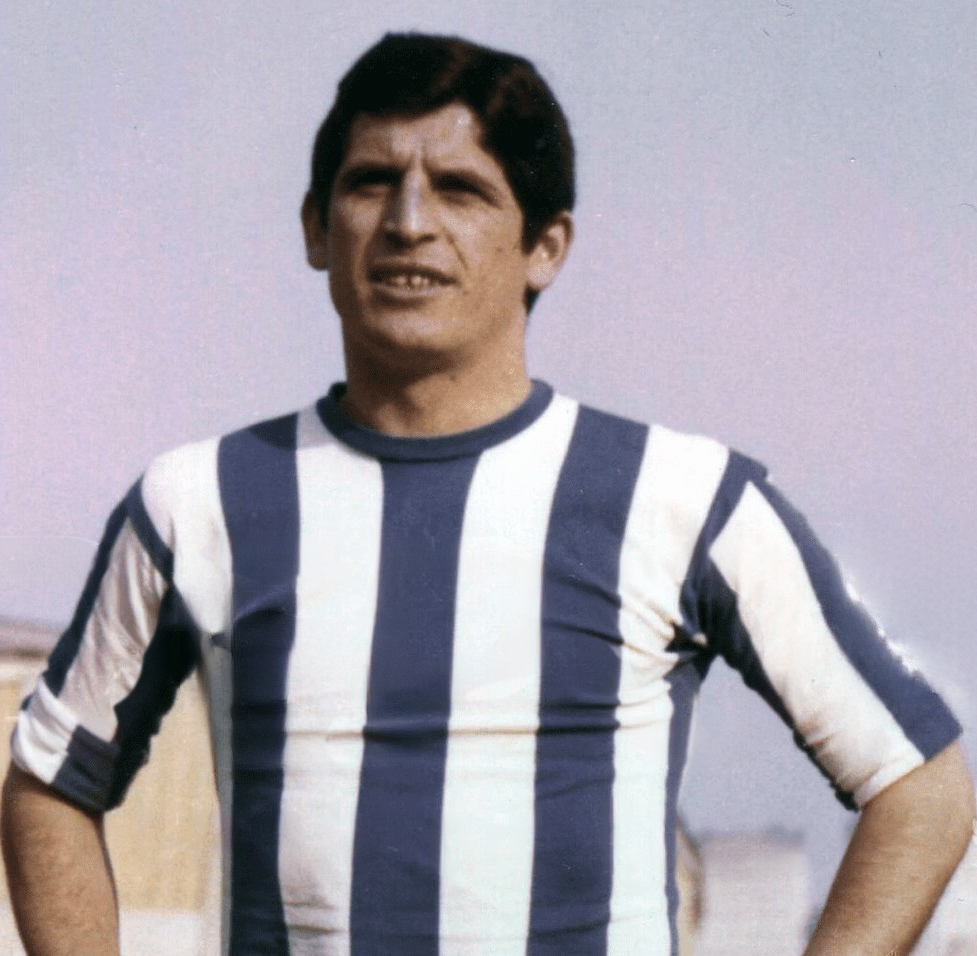
- García Mosquera with Deportivo La Coruña

Personal information
- Full name: Luis García Mosquera
- Date of birth: 13 May 1946
- Place of birth: Vivero, Galicia, Spain
- Date of death: 12 January 2024 (aged 77)
- Place of death: La Coruña, Galicia, Spain
- Height: 1.79 m (5 ft 10 in)
- Position: Defender

Senior career*
| Years | Team | Apps | (Gls) |
| 1968–1976 | Deportivo La Coruña | 207 | (2) |
| 1976–1977 | Getafe | 16 | (0) |
- * Club domestic league appearances and goals

Luis García Mosquera (13 May 1946 – 12 January 2024), known as just Luis or El Chato, was a Spanish former association football player who played as a defender. He spent most of his career playing for Deportivo La Coruña from the late 1960s to the mid-1970s.

== Career ==
Luis was born in Vivero, Galicia and at 14 years of age, would move to Vizcaya Street at La Coruña. He would play for the Liceo de Monelos in his youth career and would play there for two years. Starting in November 1964, he would play in four seasons within his youth career until being signed to play for Deportivo La Coruña in the summer of 1968. He would make his official debut with the club during the 1968–69 La Liga in a match against Málaga at the Estadio Riazor which would end in a 3–1 defeat for his club. During the season, he would play in over twenty-seven matches as a defender under manager Cheché Martín and would play alongside other players such as José Domínguez Rial, José Manuel Sertucha, Antonio Benlloch, and Manuel Ríos Quintanilla, all of which would retrospectively praise Luis' playstyle and attitude in games. When describing his relationship with other players of the club, Luis would recall an interaction with another player:

One time during a break in the locker room, I went up to a teammate who I won't name out of respect and told him that the team wasn't just about me but that I was playing with the combined fame and money of everyone involved

Luis would play a total of eight seasons with Deportivo La Coruña, making more than 207 appearances, score two goals and would oversee three relegations and two promotions with the club. In 1976, he would sign with Getafe to play in the 1976–77 Segunda División and would retire after the season, simultaneously returning to La Coruña as a result. He would make around 100 appearances within La Liga, 69 in Segunda where he would be occasionally man-marked, 19 in the Tercera Division and 19 in the Copa del Rey.

Luis died on 12 January 2024, at the age of 77.
