= Félix Ruiz =

Spanish footballer

Personal information
- Full name: Félix Ruiz Gabari
- Date of birth: 14 July 1940
- Place of birth: Olite, Spain
- Date of death: 11 February 1993 (aged 52)
- Place of death: Madrid, Spain
- Position: Midfielder

Youth career
- Osasuna

Senior career*
Years	Team	Apps	(Gls)
1958–1961	Osasuna	76	(35)
1961–1969	Real Madrid	104	(32)
1971	Toluca		
Total		180	(67)

International career
1958	Spain U18	4	(0)
1958	Spain amateur	2	(0)
1961	Spain B	1	(0)
1961–1963	Spain	4	(1)
- * Club domestic league appearances and goals

Félix Ruiz Gabari (14 July 1940 in Olite – 11 February 1993 in Madrid) was a Spanish footballer.

During his career he played for CA Osasuna, Real Madrid and Toluca de Santander. He also earned 4 caps for the Spain national football team.

== International goals ==
#	Date	Venue	Opponent	Score	Result	Competition
1.	10 December 1961	Colombes, Paris, France	France	1–1	1–1	Friendly

== Honours ==
Real Madrid

- European Cup: 1965–66
- Spanish League: 1961–62, 1962–63, 1963–64, 1964–65, 1966–67, 1967–68, 1968–69
- Spanish Cup: 1961–62
