= Isidro Sánchez =

Isidro Sánchez may refer to:

- Isidro Sánchez (soccer, born 1987), Canadian soccer player
- Isidro Sánchez (footballer, born 1936), Spanish footballer
