= Manolete (disambiguation) =

Manolete is the nickname of Manuel Laureano Rodríguez Sánchez, a famous Spanish bullfighter

Manolete may also refer to:

- Manolete (footballer) (born 1945), Manuel Ríos Quintanilla, Spanish footballer
- Manolete (film) 2007 movie with Adrien Brody and Penélope Cruz set in the 1940s
- "Manolete", song by Yawning Man

== See also ==
- A Toast for Manolete, a 1948 Spanish drama film
