= Ferenc Puskás =

Hungarian footballer (1927–2006)

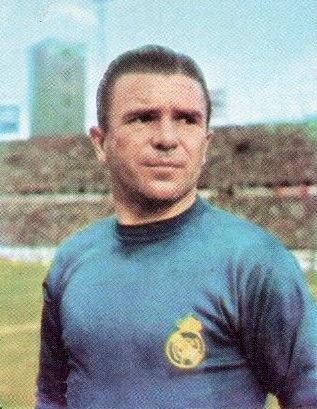
- Puskás with Real Madrid in 1965

Personal information
- Full name: Ferenc Puskás
- Birth name: Ferenc Purczeld
- Date of birth: 1 April 1927
- Place of birth: Budapest, Kingdom of Hungary
- Date of death: 17 November 2006 (aged 79)
- Place of death: Budapest, Hungary
- Height: 1.72 m (5 ft 8 in)
- Positions: Forward; attacking midfielder

Youth career
- 1940–1943: Kispest Honvéd

Senior career*
Years	Team	Apps	(Gls)
1943–1956	Budapest Honvéd (Note: Before 1950 the club name was Kispesti A.C.)	397	(428)
1958–1966	Real Madrid	262	(242)
Total		659	(670)

International career
1945–1956	Hungary	85	(84)
1961–1962	Spain	4	(0)
1963	Castile	1	(2)

Managerial career
- 1966–1967: Hércules
- 1967: San Francisco Golden Gate Gales
- 1968: Vancouver Royals
- 1968–1969: Alavés
- 1970–1974: Panathinaikos
- 1974–1975: Real Murcia
- 1975–1976: Colo-Colo
- 1975–1976: Saudi Arabia
- 1978–1979: AEK Athens
- 1979–1982: Al Masry
- 1985–1986: Sol de América
- 1986–1989: Cerro Porteño
- 1989–1992: South Melbourne
- 1993: Hungary
Medal record
Men's football
Representing Hungary
Olympic Games
Gold medal – first place	1952 Helsinki
FIFA World Cup
Silver medal – second place	1954 Switzerland
Central European International Cup
Gold medal – first place	1948–53 Europe
Silver medal – second place	1955–60 Europe
- * Club domestic league appearances and goals

Ferenc Puskás (Note: Hungarian pronunciation: [ˈfɛrɛnt͡s ˈpuʃkaːʃ], UK: /ˌfɛrɛnts ˈpʊʃkəʃ/, FERR-ents PUUSH-kəsh) (né Purczeld; 1 April 1927 – 17 November 2006) was a Hungarian professional footballer and manager. Nicknamed the "Galloping Major", Puskás is widely regarded as one of the greatest players of all time, the greatest Hungarian footballer of all time, and the sport's first international superstar. A forward and an attacking midfielder, he scored 84 goals in 85 international matches for Hungary and later played four international matches for Spain as well. He is the European all-time top assist provider in international football (53). He became an Olympic champion in 1952 and led his nation to the final of the 1954 World Cup. He won three European Cups (1959, 1960, 1966), ten national championships (five Hungarian and five Spanish Primera División) and eight top individual scoring honors. In 1995, he was recognized as the greatest top division scorer of the 20th century by the IFFHS. Scoring 802 goals in 792 official games during his career, he is the seventh top goal scorer of all time by the RSSSF.

The son of former footballer Ferenc Puskás Sr., Puskás started his career in Hungary playing for Kispest and Budapest Honvéd. He was the top scorer in the Hungarian League on four occasions, and in 1948, he was the top goal scorer in Europe. During the 1950s, he was both a prominent member and captain of the Hungary national team, known as the Mighty Magyars. After the Hungarian Revolution, Puskás served a two year ban from UEFA. Despite failing to sign for Ethnikos Piraeus in 1957 under pressure from rival clubs, in 1958, he emigrated to Spain where he successfully signed for Real Madrid at the age of 31. While playing with the club, Puskás won four Pichichi Trophies, which is awarded to the top goalscorer of La Liga each season, and scored seven goals in two European Cup finals, winning the competition three times with the club and claiming five consecutive La Liga titles. He scored 619 goals in 618 matches in the Hungarian and Spanish leagues and National Cups.

After retiring as a player, he became a coach. The highlight of his managerial career came in 1971 when he guided Panathinaikos to the European Cup final, where they lost 2–0 to Ajax. He also led the club to the championship in 1972, becoming an icon in the country. Afterward he'd have spells at various countries and clubs, including Spain, Paraguay and the Saudi Arabia national team, with varying success. He returned again to Greece to manage an exceptionally strong AEK Athens team for the 1978–79 season. In 1993, he returned to Hungary and took temporary charge of the Hungary national team. In 1998, he became one of the first ever FIFA/SOS Charity ambassadors. In 2002, the Népstadion in Budapest was renamed the Puskás Ferenc Stadion in his honor. He was also declared the best Hungarian player of the last 50 years by the Hungarian Football Federation in the UEFA Jubilee Awards in November 2003. In October 2009, FIFA announced the introduction of the FIFA Puskás Award, awarded to the player who has scored the "most beautiful goal" over the past calendar year. In 2004, he was listed by Pelé in the FIFA 100, which featured his choices for the 100 best living footballers at the time of its release.

== Early life and youth career ==
Ferenc Purczeld was born on 1 April 1927 to a German (Danube Swabian) family in Budapest and brought up in Kispest, then a suburb, today part of the city. His mother, Margit Biró (1904–1976), was a seamstress. He began his career as a junior with Kispest Honvéd, where his father, who had previously played for the club, was a coach.

In 1937, his father changed the family name to Puskás. He initially used the pseudonym "Miklós Kovács" to help circumvent the minimum age rules before officially signing at the age of 12. Among his early teammates was his childhood friend and future international teammate József Bozsik. He made his first senior appearance for Kispest in November 1943 in a match against NAC. It was here where he received the nickname "Öcsi" or "Buddy".

== Club career ==
=== Budapest Honvéd ===
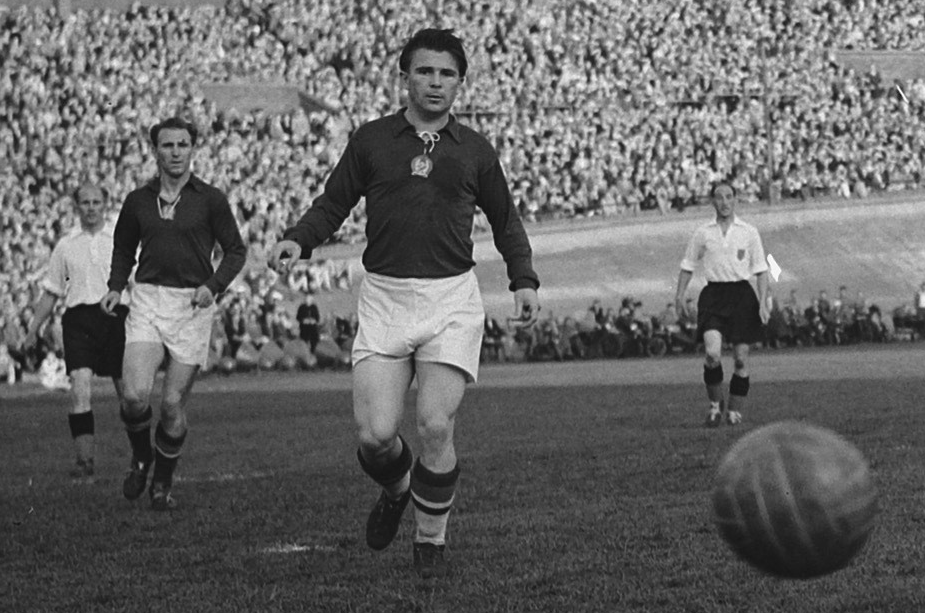
Nándor Hidegkuti and Ferenc Puskás in 1954

On 19 February 1949, Puskás scored seven goals for Kispest in a 11–3 win against Győr. Kispest was taken over by the Hungarian Ministry of Defence in 1949, becoming the Hungarian Army team and changing its name to Budapest Honvéd. As a result, football players were given military ranks. Puskás eventually became a major (Hungarian: Őrnagy), which led to the nickname "The Galloping Major". As the army club, Honvéd used conscription to acquire the best Hungarian players leading to the recruitment of Zoltán Czibor and Sándor Kocsis. During his career at Budapest Honvéd, Puskás helped the club win five Hungarian League titles. He also finished as top goal scorer in the league in 1947–48, 1949–50, 1950 and 1953, scoring 50, 31, 25 and 27 goals, respectively. In 1948, he was the top goal scorer in Europe.

Budapest Honvéd entered the European Cup in 1956 and were drawn against Athletic Bilbao in the first round. Honvéd lost the away leg 2–3, but before the home leg could be played, the Hungarian Revolution erupted in Budapest and was subsequently brutally repressed by Soviet forces. The players decided against going back to communist Hungary and arranged for the return with Athletic to be played at Heysel Stadium in Brussels, Belgium. Puskás scored in the subsequent 3–3 draw, his first European Cup goal ever, but Honvéd were eliminated 6–5 on aggregate, and the Hungarian players were left in limbo. They summoned their families from Budapest, and despite opposition from FIFA and the Hungarian football authorities, they organised a fundraising tour of Italy, Portugal, Spain, and Brazil. After returning to Europe, the players parted ways. Some, including Bozsik, returned to Hungary while others, including Czibor, Kocsis and Puskás, found new clubs in Western Europe. Puskás did not return to Hungary until 1981.

After refusing to return to Hungary, Puskás initially played a few unofficial games for Espanyol. At the same time, both AC Milan and Juventus attempted to sign him, but then he received a two-year ban from UEFA for refusing to return to Budapest, which prevented him from playing in Europe. He moved to Austria and then Italy. After his ban expired, Puskás tried to play in Italy but was not able to find a top-flight club willing to sign him, as Italian managers were concerned about his age and weight. He was considered by Manchester United to strengthen a squad ravaged by the Munich air disaster in 1958, but because of FA rules regarding foreigners and Puskás' not knowing the English language, stand-in manager Jimmy Murphy could not fulfill his wish of signing the Hungarian. However, a few months later, Puskás joined Real Madrid and at the age of 31 embarked on the second phase of his career.

=== Real Madrid ===
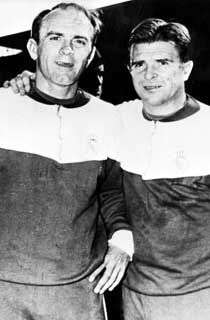
Ferenc Puskás with Alfredo Di Stéfano

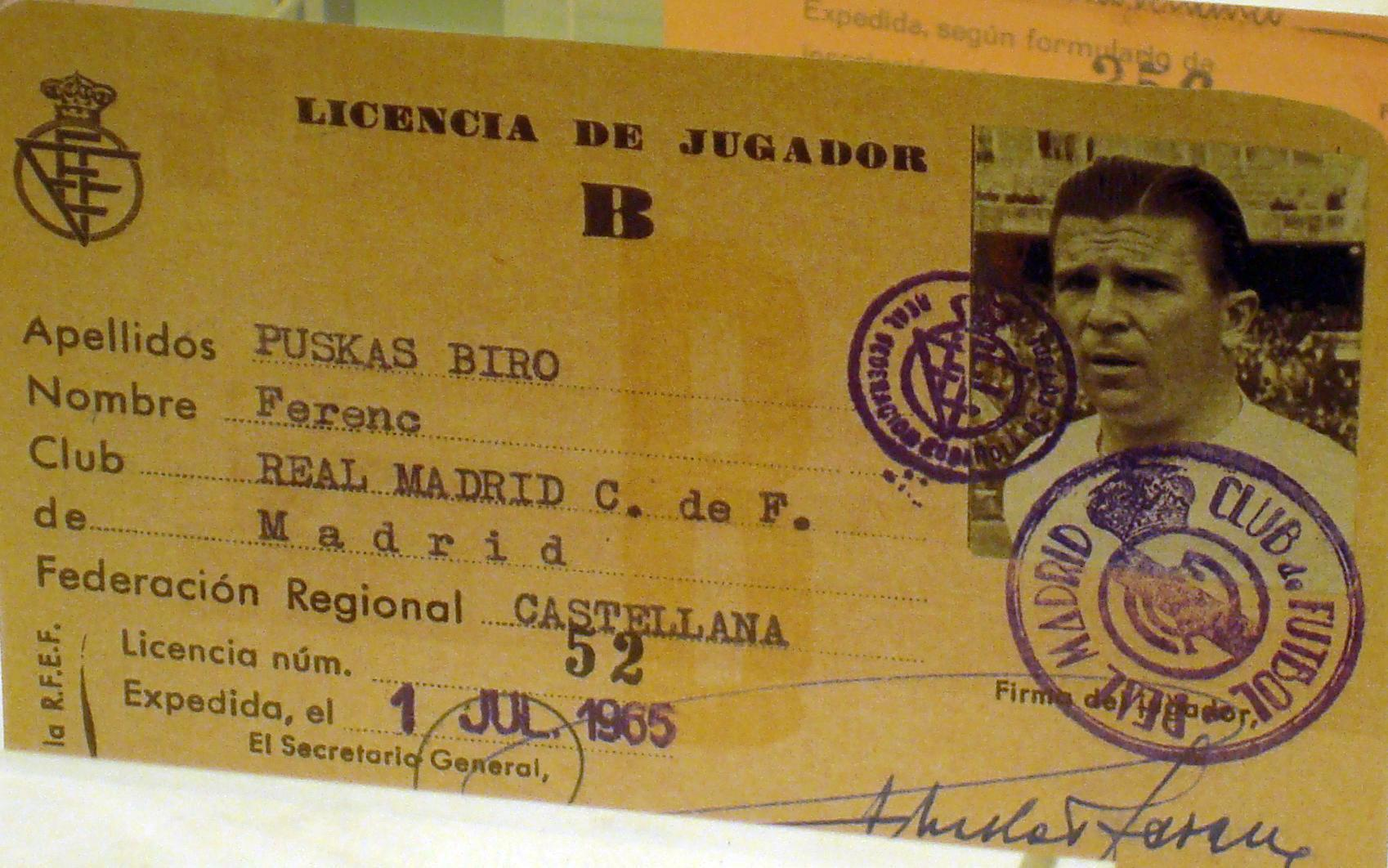
Puskás's player licence during his time at Real Madrid, showing his mother's maiden name Biró as a second surname in accordance with Spanish naming customs

During his first La Liga season, Puskás scored four hat-tricks, including one in his second game, against Sporting de Gijón on 21 September 1958. In the game against Las Palmas on 4 January 1959, Puskás and Alfredo di Stéfano scored hat-tricks in a 10–1 win. During the 1960–61 season, Puskás scored four times in a game against Elche and the following season, he scored five goals against the same team. Puskás scored two hat-tricks against Barcelona in 1963, one at the Bernabéu and one at the Camp Nou. During eight seasons with Real, Puskás played 180 La Liga games and scored 156 goals. He scored 20 or more goals in each of his first six seasons in the Spanish league, and won the Pichichi four times: in 1960, 1961, 1963, and 1964, scoring 25, 28, 26 and 21 goals, respectively. He helped Real win La Liga five times in a row between 1961 and 1965 and the Copa del Generalísimo in 1962. He scored both goals in the 2–1 victory over Sevilla in the final.

Puskás also played a further 39 games for Real in the European Cup, scoring 35 goals. He helped Real reach the final of the 1958–59 European Cup, scoring in the first leg and in the decisive replay of the semi-final against Atlético Madrid, but missed the final due to injury. In the following season he began Real's 1959–60 European Cup campaign with a hat-trick against Jeunesse Esch and in the semi-final against FC Barcelona, as Puskás once again guided Real into the final with three goals over two legs. In the final itself, Real beat Eintracht Frankfurt 7–3 with Puskás scoring four goals and di Stéfano scoring three. In subsequent European campaigns, he would score a further three hat-tricks, including one in the 1962 final against Benfica, which Real lost 5–3. In 1965, he scored five goals over two games against Feyenoord as he helped Real Madrid to the 1966 European Cup final – Real won the game against Partizan Belgrade, but Puskás did not play.

== International career ==
=== Golden Team ===
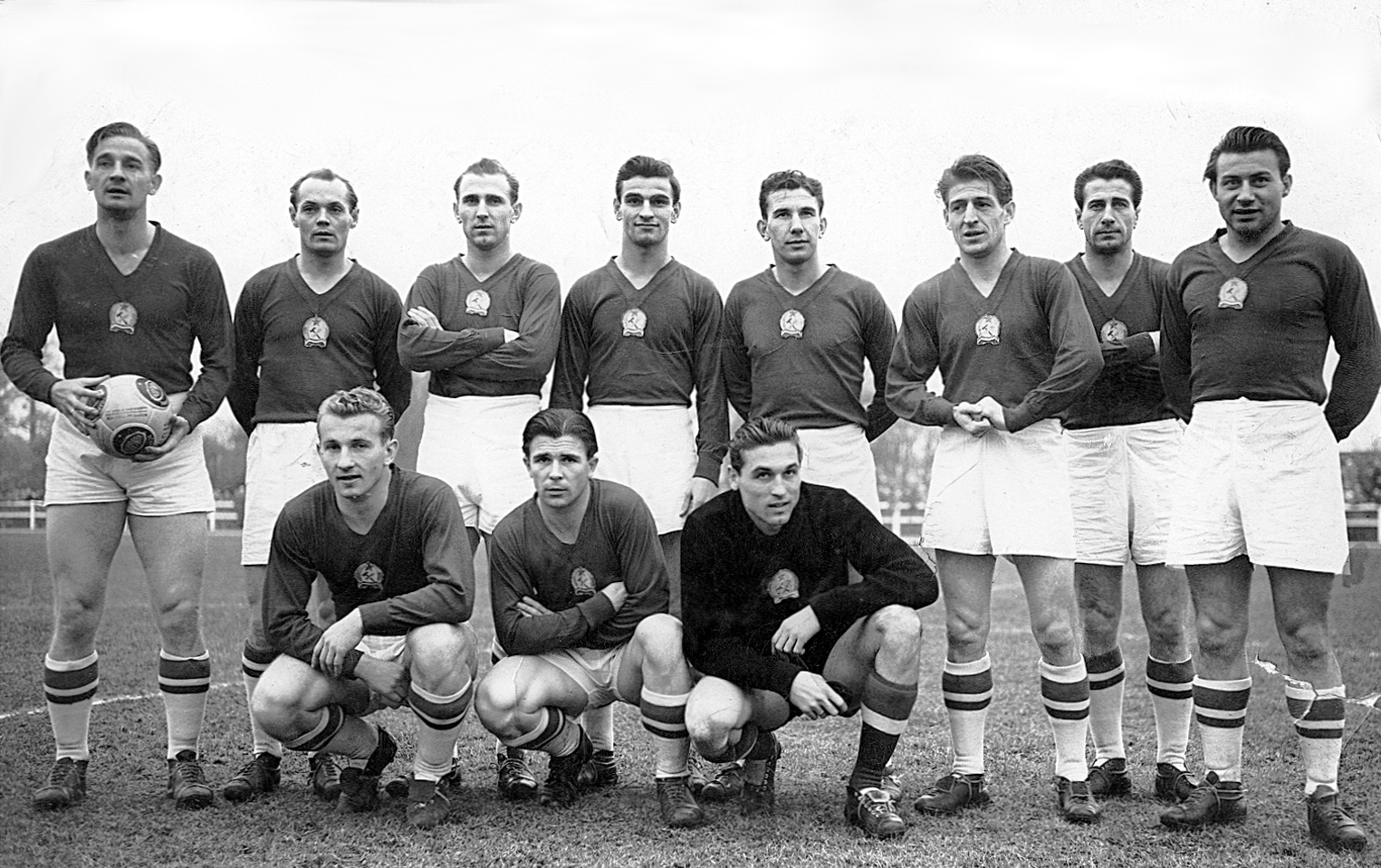
The Golden Team in 1953 front row: Mihály Lantos, Ferenc Puskás, Gyula Grosics back row: Gyula Lóránt, Jenő Buzánszky, Nándor Hidegkuti, Sándor Kocsis, József Zakariás, Zoltán Czibor, József Bozsik, László Budai

Puskás made his debut for Hungary on 20 August 1945 and scored in a 5–2 win over Austria. He went on to play 85 games and scored 84 times for Hungary. His international goal record included two hat tricks against Austria, one against Luxembourg and four goals in a 12–0 win over Albania. Together with Zoltán Czibor, Sándor Kocsis, József Bozsik, and Nándor Hidegkuti, he formed the nucleus of the Golden Team that was to remain unbeaten for 32 consecutive games. During this run, they became Olympic Champions in 1952, beating Yugoslavia 2–0 in the final in Helsinki. Puskás scored four times at the Olympic tournament, including the opening goal in the final. They also defeated England twice, first with a 6–3 win at Wembley Stadium, and then 7–1 in Budapest. Puskás scored two goals in each game against England. In 1953, they also won the 1948-53 Central European International Cup. Hungary won the championship after finishing top of the table with 11 points. Puskás finished the tournament as top scorer with ten goals and scored twice as Hungary claimed the trophy with a 3–0 win over Italy at the Stadio Olimpico in 1953.

Puskás scored three goals in the two first-round matches Hungary played at the 1954 FIFA World Cup. They defeated South Korea 9–0 and then West Germany 8–3. In the latter game, he suffered a hairline fracture of the ankle after a tackle by Werner Liebrich, and did not return until the final.

Puskás played the entire 1954 World Cup final against West Germany with a hairline fracture. Despite this, he scored his fourth goal of the tournament to put Hungary ahead after six minutes, and with Czibor adding another goal two minutes later, it seemed that the pre-tournament favorites would take the title. However, the West Germans pulled back two goals before half time, with six minutes left the West Germans scored the winner. Two minutes from the end of the match Puskás scored a late equalizer but the goal was disallowed due to an offside call. Ending the Golden years with a silver medal at the 1955-60 Central European International Cup, making it a grand total of two gold/titles and two silver for the Mighty Magyars.

=== Ferenc Puskás' statistics at the 1952 Helsinki Olympics ===
The scores contain links to the article on football in the Helsinki Olympics and the round in question.

Game no.	Round	Date	Opponent	Puskás' playing time	Score	Puskás' goals	Score	Times	Venue	Report
1	Prel. R.	15 July 1952	Romania	90 min.	2–1 (1–0)	0	—	—	Kupittaa, Turku	
2	1st R	21 July 1952	Italy	90 min.	3–0 (2–0)	0	—	—	Pallokenttä, Helsinki	
3	QF	24 July 1952	Turkey	90 min	7–1 (2–0)	2	4–0; 6–1	54'; 72'	Urheilukeskus, Kotka	
4	SF	28 July 1952	Sweden	90 min	6–0 (3–0)	1	1–0	1'	Helsinki Olympic Stadium	
5	Final	2 August 1952	Yugoslavia	90 min	2–0 (0–0)	1	1–0	70'	Helsinki Olympic Stadium	

=== Ferenc Puskás' statistics at the 1954 World Cup in Switzerland ===
The scores contain links to the article on 1954 FIFA World Cup and the round in question. When there is a special article on the match in question, the link is in the column for round.

Game no.	Round	Date	Opponent	Puskás' playing time	Score	Puskás' goals	Score	Times	Venue	Report
1	Group 2	17 June 1954	South Korea	90 min.	9–0 (4–0)	2	1–0; 9–0	12'; 89'	Hardturm Stadium, Zürich	
2	Group 2	20 June 1954	West Germany	90 min	8–3 (3–1)	1	2–0	17'	St. Jakob Stadium, Basel	
–	QF	27 June 1954	Brazil	Did not play	4–2 (2–1)	0	–	—	Wankdorf Stadium, Bern	
–	SF	30 June 1954	Uruguay	Did not play	4–2 (a.e.t.) (2–2, 1–0)	0	–	—	Stade Olympique de la Pontaise, Lausanne	
3	Final	4 July 1954	West Germany	90 min	2–3 (2–2)	1	1–0	6'	Wankdorf Stadium, Bern	

=== Other appearances ===
In 1962, Puskás became a naturalized Spanish citizen, and subsequently played four times for Spain. Three of these games were at the 1962 World Cup. In Spain, he was known as Cañoncito Pum (The Booming Cannon). On 28 October 1963, Puskás appeared in a game for the Madrid football team at the FFM Trofeo Bodas de Oro, and he scored two late goals in a 4–0 win over Andalusia. In 1967, at the age of 40, he appeared in a fundraising friendly game for South Liverpool, the English non-League side, in front of a 10,000-strong sell-out crowd at the club's stadium in Holly Park.

== Managerial career ==
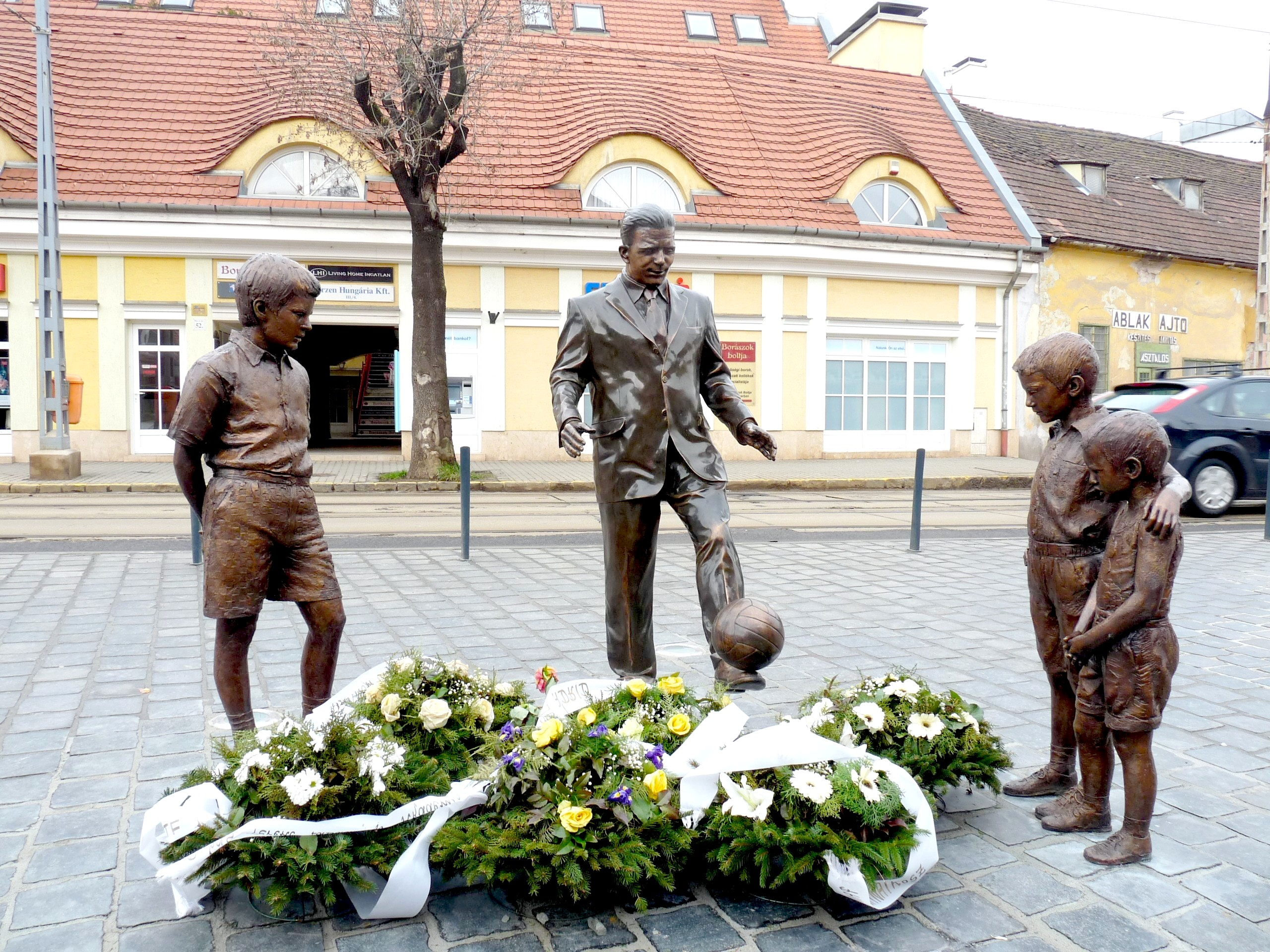
Statue of Ferenc Puskás in Budapest inspired by a photograph taken in Madrid in which the legendary player was teaching an ad hoc course in keepie uppie to street children

After retiring as a player, Puskás became a coach and managed teams in Europe, North America, South America, Africa, Asia, and Australia.

In 1971, he guided Panathinaikos of Greece to the European Cup final. This was the first time a Greek club has reached a European final, and this would remain the only time for more than half a century, until Olympiakos reached the final of the UEFA Europa Conference League in 2024. En route to the final, Panathinaikos beat Everton in the quarter-finals on away goals, then defeated Red Star Belgrade in the semis, to become the only amateur football team to reach the European Cup/Champions League final. In the final, Panathinaikos lost 2–0 to Johan Cruyff's Ajax.

During his four-year tenure at Panathinaikos, Puskás helped the team secure one Greek Championship in 1972. At Panathinaikos he retained the nickname "Pancho" from Spain and is considered the greatest ever manager of Panathinaikos, in the same esteem with his predecessor Stjepan Bobek and has entered the Greek football pantheon after Panathinaikos' run to the Wembley Final. A few months after leaving Panathinaikos in 1974, he took over Real Murcia, placed last in La Liga when he was appointed in December, failing to save the club from relegation in his only season in charge, while the following year he coached Saudi Arabia and in the same year he also managed Colo-Colo, where he spent two years, without experiencing notable success.

In the summer of 1978 he returned to Greece and took the wheel of the domestic double winners, AEK Athens, where he reunited with his former captain at Panathinaikos, Mimis Domazos. Puskás led the club to its biggest ever victory in the European Cup, a 6–1 defeat of Portuguese champions Porto in Athens, before their continental run was cut short in the second round by eventual competition winners Nottingham Forest 7–2 on aggregate. However, in March 1979 the club's management, fearing the eventual loss of the league, replaced him with his assistant, Andreas Stamatiadis, on an interim role for the final 11 games until the end of the season, due to the unstable performances of the team, which saw them drop to third place in the league table. The club of Athens eventually won the championship with Stamatiadis in charge in a play–off match that was never contested, as rivals Olympiacos refused to play.

Despite his wide travels, his only other silverware came with Sol de América, where he led the club to its first ever league title in 1986, and South Melbourne Hellas, with whom he won the National Soccer League title in 1991, as well as the NSL Cup in 1990, the NSL League Cup in 1990 and two Dockerty Cup titles in 1989 and 1991, becoming the club's most successful manager. While managing the Australian club, one of his players was future South Melbourne, Australia, Glasgow Celtic F.C. and Tottenham Hotspur manager Ange Postecoglou, who has spoken of the influence Puskás' all out attacking approach and tactical acumen had on his coaching style.

When Wolverhampton Wanderers opened their renovated stadium Molineux in 1993, Puskás visited the newly opened stadium as an honorary guest to watch the friendly match between Wolves and Budapest Honvéd, which was a match to christen the new opening of the stadium. This was because in the 1950s, Wolves played a game against Honvéd in a memorable friendly match, which Puskás played in. Wolves won the 1954 match 3–2, with the 1993 match ending in a 1–1 draw.

Puskás returned to Hungary for the first time in 1981 and in 1990, he made Budapest his home again. In 1993, he took charge of the Hungary national team for four games, including a 4–2 friendly victory against the Republic of Ireland in Dublin, where Hungary came from two goals down to eventually beat their opponents.

== Style of play ==
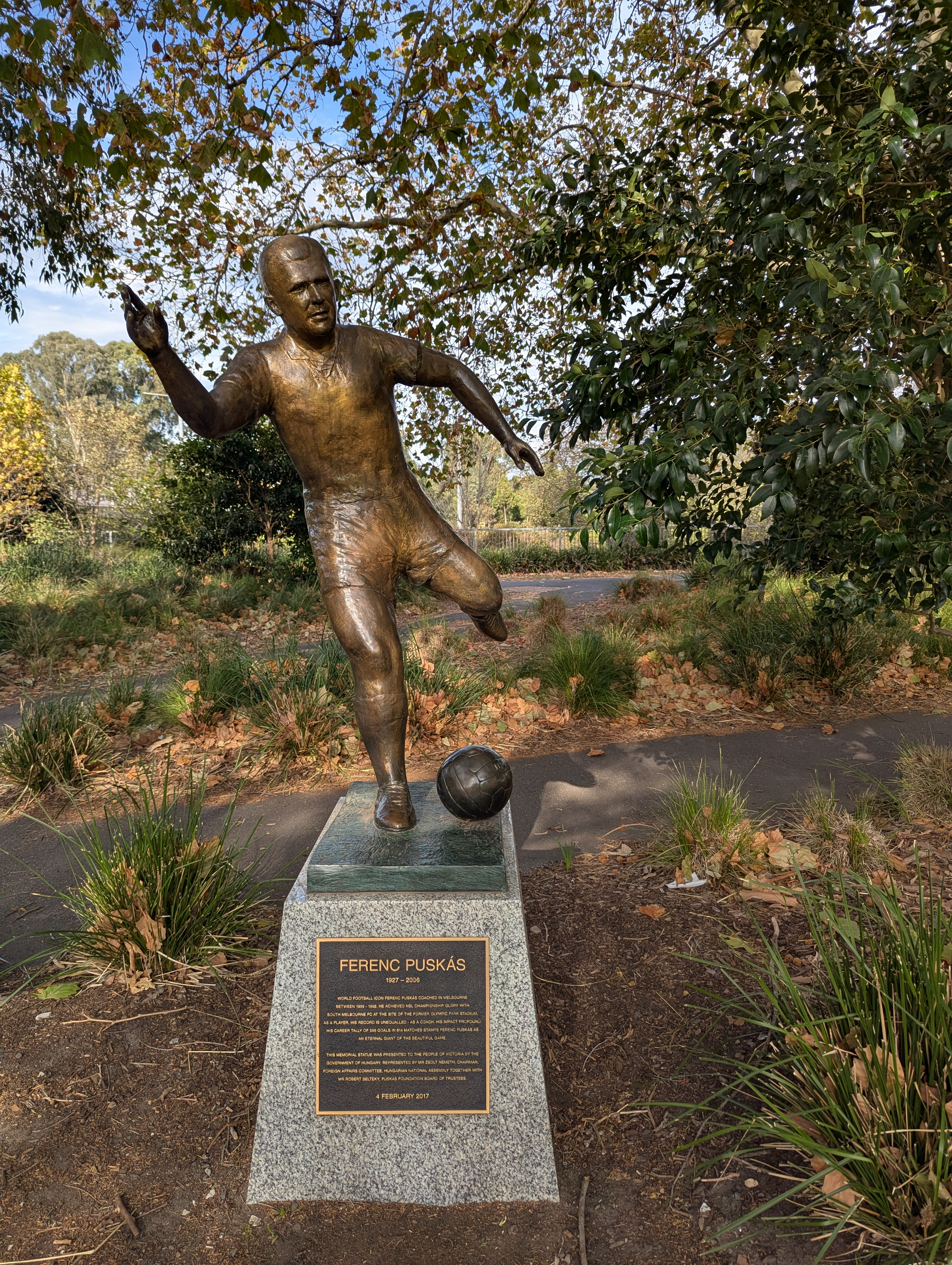
Statue of Puskás in Melbourne, Australia

Puskás had excellent ball control, mostly with his left foot, and had a great first touch of the ball giving very quick and precise passing and crossing. He was also able to maneuver and change positions quickly on the pitch by moving from inside left to centre forward. He was also able to dummy his opponents with fake dribbles and would confuse his markers by pretending to go one way before going another. He did this to Bill Eckersley and Harry Johnston when Hungary beat England 6–3 at Wembley. Puskás also used to move the ball in different directions and sideways to go past his opponents with ease. Puskás was also excellent at set pieces, often scoring powerful direct free-kicks. He also scored directly from a corner kick. Puskás had one of the most powerful left footed shots in history and often scored from 30 to 35 metres from goal.

== Personal life and death ==
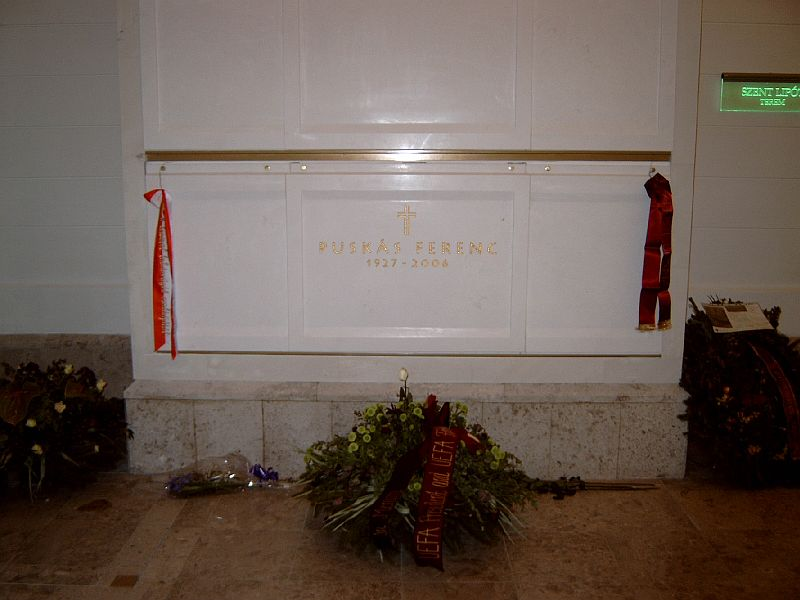
Puskás's tomb at St. Stephen's Basilica in Budapest

Puskás was diagnosed with Alzheimer's disease in 2000. He was admitted to a Budapest hospital in September 2006 and died on 17 November 2006 of pneumonia. He was 79 years old and was survived by his wife of 57 years, Erzsébet, and their daughter, Anikó. In a state funeral, his coffin was moved from Puskás Ferenc Stadion to Heroes' Square for a military salute. He was buried under the dome of St. Stephen's Basilica in Budapest on 9 December 2006.

== Legacy ==
List	Ref
The Népstadion in Budapest was renamed the Puskás Ferenc Stadion in 2002.	
Asteroid 82656 Puskás, discovered by Krisztián Sárneczky and Gyula M. Szabó in 2001, was named in his honor.	
The official naming citation was published by the Minor Planet Center on 9 August 2006 (MPC 57425).	
A street named Újtemető utca near Stadium Bozsik in the Hungarian capital of Budapest (specifically the district of Kispest) was renamed after Puskás precisely one year after the footballer's death.	
The new Puskás Aréna, its metro station, Puskás Akadémia FC, Puskás Cup, and the FIFA Puskás Award all bear his name.	
A statue of Puskás was unveiled in 2017 in Melbourne, Australia, near the former site of the now demolished Olympic Park Stadium, where he led South Melbourne Hellas to the 1991 NSL Championship as manager.	

== Film ==
List	Ref
He appears in Wonder Striker (A csodacsatár). It was directed by Márton Keleti.	
He appears in one scene in the Egyptian movie Ghareeb fi Bayti (English: A stranger in my house) while he was watching the football match in the stands. At the time of the film, he was a coach for the Egyptian club Al Masry.	
In one scene, he appears with Flórián Albert in The Enchanted Dollar, which was directed by István Bujtor.	
Tamás Almási (director), Ádám Neményi (producer): Puskás Hungary, documentary, 2009.	
Csaba Gellár (director), Tamás Lajos, Sándor Takó (producer): The World of Little Puskás animation series, 2021.	

== Career statistics ==
=== Club ===
Club	Season	League			National cup (Note: Includes Magyar Kupa, Copa del Generalísimo)		Europe		Other		Total	
Club	Season	Division	Apps	Goals	Apps	Goals	Apps	Goals	Apps	Goals	Apps	Goals
Kispest/Budapesti; Honvéd SE	1943–44, 1944	Nemzeti Bajnokság I	29	13	—		—		—		29	13
Kispest/Budapesti; Honvéd SE	1944-45	Nemzeti Bajnokság I	22	11	—		—		—		22	11
Kispest/Budapesti; Honvéd SE	1945–46	Nemzeti Bajnokság I	34	36	—		—		—		34	36
Kispest/Budapesti; Honvéd SE	1946–47	Nemzeti Bajnokság I	29	32	—		—		—		29	32
Kispest/Budapesti; Honvéd SE	1947–48	Nemzeti Bajnokság I	31	50	—		—		—		31	50
Kispest/Budapesti; Honvéd SE	1948–49	Nemzeti Bajnokság I	28	46	—		—		—		28	46
Kispest/Budapesti; Honvéd SE	1949–50	Nemzeti Bajnokság I	30	31	—		—		—		30	31
Kispest/Budapesti; Honvéd SE	1950	Nemzeti Bajnokság I	15	25	—		—		—		15	25
Kispest/Budapesti; Honvéd SE	1951	Nemzeti Bajnokság I	25	25	2	4	—		—		27	29
Kispest/Budapesti; Honvéd SE	1952	Nemzeti Bajnokság I	26	26	4	2	—		—		30	28
Kispest/Budapesti; Honvéd SE	1953	Nemzeti Bajnokság I	26	30	3	13	—		4	6	33	49
Kispest/Budapesti; Honvéd SE	1954	Nemzeti Bajnokság I	24	27	5	10	—		—		29	37
Kispest/Budapesti; Honvéd SE	1955	Nemzeti Bajnokság I	26	20	6	4	4 (Note: Appearances in Mitropa Cup)	3	—		36	27
Kispest/Budapesti; Honvéd SE	1956	Nemzeti Bajnokság I	19	8	3	5	2 (Note: Appearances in European Cup)	1	—		24	14
Kispest/Budapesti; Honvéd SE	Total		364	380	23	38	6	4	4	6	397	428
Real Madrid	1958–59	La Liga	24	21	5	2	5	2	—		34	25
Real Madrid	1959–60	La Liga	24	25	5	10	7	12	—		36	47
Real Madrid	1960–61	La Liga	28	28	9	14	2	0	2 (Note: Appearances in Intercontinental Cup)	2	41	44
Real Madrid	1961–62	La Liga	23	20	8	13	9	7	—		40	40
Real Madrid	1962–63	La Liga	30	26	7	5	2	0	—		39	31
Real Madrid	1963–64	La Liga	25	21	0	0	8	7	—		33	28
Real Madrid	1964–65	La Liga	18	11	4	4	3	2	—		25	17
Real Madrid	1965–66	La Liga	8	4	3	1	3	5	—		14	10
Real Madrid	Total		180	156	41	49	39	35	2	2	262	242
Career total			544	536	64	87	45	39	6	8	659	670

=== International ===
Appearances and goals by national team and year

National team	Year	Apps	Goals
Hungary	1945	2	3
Hungary	1946	3	3
Hungary	1947	5	5
Hungary	1948	6	7
Hungary	1949	8	11
Hungary	1950	6	12
Hungary	1951	3	4
Hungary	1952	12	10
Hungary	1953	7	6
Hungary	1954	11	8
Hungary	1955	12	10
Hungary	1956	9	4
Hungary	Total	85	84
Spain	1961	1	0
Spain	1962	3	0
Spain	Total	4	0
Madrid	1963	1	2
Madrid	Total	1	2
Career total		90	86

== Managerial statistics ==
Managerial record by team and tenure
Team	Nat	From	To	Record					Ref
Team	Nat	From	To	G	W	D	L	Win %	Ref
Hércules	(Spain)	23 July 1966	28 June 1967	34	8	9	17	23.53	
Alavés	(Spain)	1 July 1968	26 June 1969	38	15	5	18	39.47	
Panathinaikos	(Greece)	1 July 1970	4 September 1974	170	109	32	29	64.12	
Real Murcia	(Spain)	6 December 1974	16 June 1975	26	6	5	15	23.08	
Colo-Colo	(Chile)	17 June 1975	19 August 1976	42	21	9	12	50.00	
AEK	(Greece)	11 June 1978	17 March 1979	31	19	6	6	61.29	
Hungary	(Hungary)	9 April 1993	22 June 1993	4	1	0	3	25.00	

== Honours ==
=== Player ===
Budapest Honvéd

- Nemzeti Bajnokság I: 1949–50, 1950, 1952, 1954, 1955

Real Madrid

- La Liga: 1960–61, 1961–62, 1962–63, 1963–64, 1964–65
- Copa del Generalísimo: 1961–62
- European Cup: 1958–59, 1959–60, 1965–66
- Intercontinental Cup: 1960

Hungary

- Summer Olympics: 1952
- Central European International Cup: 1948–53; runner-up: 1955–60
- Balkan Cup: 1947
- FIFA World Cup runner-up: 1954

Individual

- Ballon d'Or Silver Award: 1960
- Hungarian Football Federation Player of the Year: 1950
- Central European International Cup top scorer: 1948-53
- Hungarian top scorer: 1947–48, 1949–50, 1950, 1953
- Spanish League top scorer (Pichichi Trophy): 1959–60, 1960–61, 1962–63, 1963–64
- European Cup top scorer : 1959–60, 1963–64
- Golden Boot of the World: 1948
- World Soccer World XI: 1960, 1961, 1962, 1963
- 1954 FIFA World Cup: Golden Ball
- 1954 FIFA World Cup: All-Star Team
- European Player of the 20th century – L'Equipe
- Hungarian Player of the 20th century – IFFHS
- Football's Top Scorer of the 20th century – IFFHS
- Member of the FIFA 100
- UEFA Golden Player: Greatest Hungarian Footballer of the last 50 Years
- Inaugural Inductee into Goal Hall of Fame 2014
- Top 10 Greatest Players of the 20th century (#7) – World Soccer Magazine
- Top 10 World's Best Players of the 20th century (#6) – IFFHS
- Top 10 Europe's Best Players of the 20th century (#4) – IFFHS
- Golden Foot: 2006 (as a legend)
- IFFHS Legends
- IFFHS Men Team of the Century (1901–2000)
- International Football Hall of Champions: Inaugural Class (1998)

=== Manager ===
Panathinaikos

- Alpha Ethniki: 1971–72
- European Cup runner-up: 1970–71
- Intercontinental Cup runner–up: 1971
- Football Cup of Greater Greece: 1970

Sol de América

- Paraguayan Primera División: 1986

South Melbourne Hellas

- National Soccer League: 1990–91
- NSL Cup: 1989–90
- NSL League Cup: 1990
- Dockerty Cup: 1989, 1991

=== Orders ===
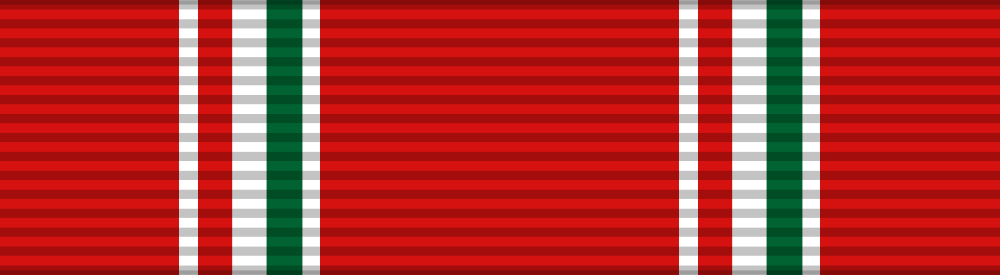
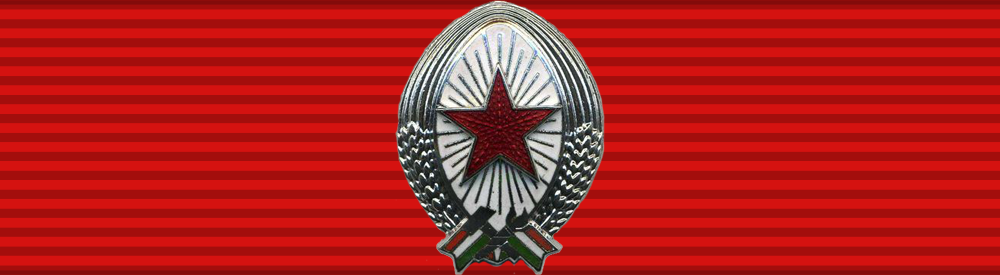

== See also ==
- List of top international association football goal scorers by country
- List of men's footballers with 50 or more international goals
- List of Spain international footballers born outside Spain
- List of Soviet and Eastern Bloc defectors
- List of footballers with 500 or more goals
- List of footballers who achieved hat-trick records
- List of European association football families
