= Antonio Benlloch =

Spanish footballer (born 1945)

Bellod
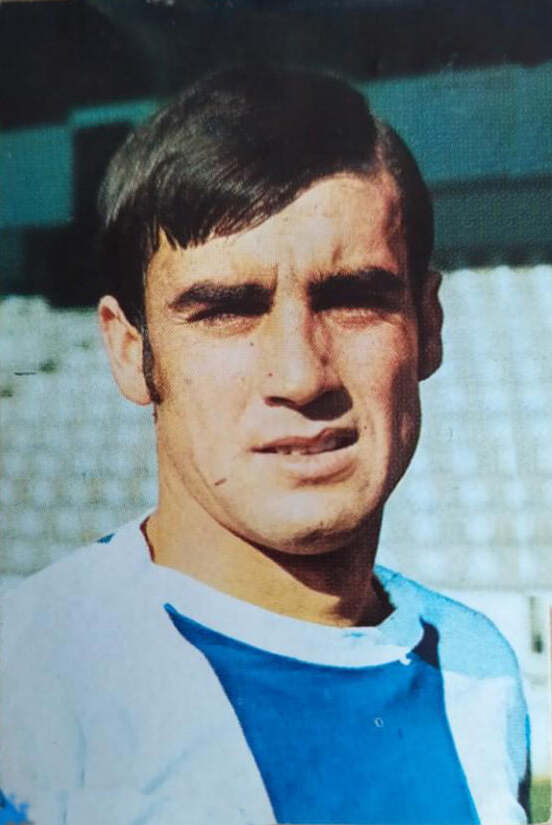
- Belloch with Deportivo La Coruña

Personal information
- Full name: Antonio Benlloch García
- Date of birth: 1 December 1945 (age 80)
- Place of birth: Orihuela, Valencia, Spain
- Height: 1.68 m (5 ft 6 in)
- Position: Centre-back

Senior career*
Years	Team	Apps	(Gls)
1965–1968	Hércules	47	(0)
1968–1977	La Coruña	216	(0)
- * Club domestic league appearances and goals

Antonio Benlloch García (born 1 November 1945) is a Spanish retired footballer. Nicknamed Bellod and "Belló", he played as a defender for Hércules in the mid-1960s and for La Coruña throughout the 1970s.

== Club career ==
Benlloch was born on 1 November 1945 at Orihuela and would make his professional debut as a footballer during the 1965–66 Segunda División at the age of 20 in 1966 in a match held in Alicante. In that same season, he would be part of the squad that would win the tournament and be promoted for the 1966–67 La Liga. He would also frequently play alongside José Domínguez Rial as the club's central defenders and develop a friendship as the two would frequently attend mass together. Throughout his overall career, Benlloch would emphasize as a centre-back and focus on clean play, only earning three yellow cards in his entire career. He then played for La Coruña for the 1968–69 La Liga for the remainder of his career until his retirement following the 1976–77 Segunda División.
