= José Vicente (footballer) =

Spanish footballer

Personal information
- Full name: José Vicente Train
- Date of birth: 19 December 1931 (age 94)
- Place of birth: Barcelona, Spain
- Position: Goalkeeper

Youth career
- Peña Morales
- Centro Aragonés

Senior career*
| Years | Team | Apps | (Gls) |
| 1952–1953 | Mollet | | |
| 1953–1954 | Horta | | |
| 1954–1956 | Mollet | | |
| 1956–1960 | Espanyol | 109 | (0) |
| 1960–1964 | Real Madrid | 76 | (0) |
| 1964–1966 | Mallorca | 56 | (0) |
| 1966–1967 | Deportivo | 10 | (0) |

International career
| 1957–1960 | Spain B | 5 | (0) |
| 1961–1963 | Spain | 7 | (0) |
- * Club domestic league appearances and goals

José Vicente Train (born 19 December 1931 in Barcelona, Catalonia) is a Spanish former football goalkeeper.

During his career he played for RCD Espanyol, Real Madrid, RCD Mallorca and Deportivo de La Coruña. He also earned 7 caps for the Spain national football team.

== Honours ==
Real Madrid

- Intercontinental Cup: 1960
- Spanish League: 1960–61, 1961–62, 1962–63, 1963–64
- Spanish Cup: 1961–62
- Zamora Trophy: 1960–61, 1962–63, 1963–64
