= José Araquistáin =

Spanish footballer (1937–2025)

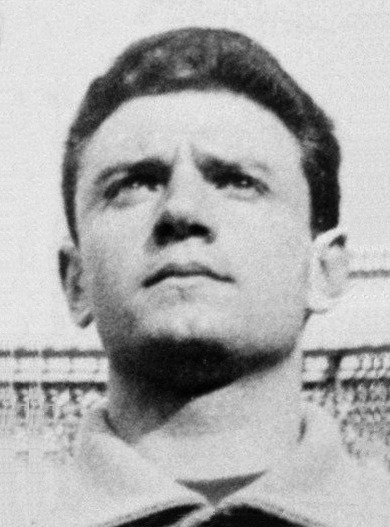
- Araquistáin in 1962

Personal information
- Full name: José Araquistáin Arrieta
- Date of birth: 4 March 1937
- Place of birth: Azkoitia, Spain
- Date of death: 28 September 2025 (aged 88)
- Height: 1.80 m (5 ft 11 in)
- Position: Goalkeeper

Youth career
- Elgoibar
- Real Sociedad

Senior career*
Years	Team	Apps	(Gls)
1956–1961	Real Sociedad	106	(0)
1956	→ Eibar (loan)	6	(0)
1961–1968	Real Madrid	57	(0)
1968–1971	Elche	49	(0)
1971–1973	Castellón	35	(0)
Total		253	(0)

International career
1959–1960	Spain U21	3	(0)
1958–1959	Spain B	3	(0)
1960–1962	Spain	6	(0)
- * Club domestic league appearances and goals

José Araquistáin Arrieta (4 March 1937 – 28 September 2025) was a Spanish footballer who played as a goalkeeper.

== Club career ==
=== Real Sociedad ===
Born in Azkoitia, Gipuzkoa, Araquistáin started his career with local Real Sociedad, playing five La Liga seasons with the club and being first-choice in four of those. He made his debut in the competition on 2 December 1956, in a 3–2 away win against Celta de Vigo.

=== Real Madrid ===
Araquistáin moved to Real Madrid for the 1961–62 season. He played 25 games in his first year, winning the double and the Ricardo Zamora Trophy in the process.

In the following years, Araquistáin was more often than not in the losing end of a battle for first-choice duties with José Vicente Train and Antonio Betancort. His best output came in the 1963–64 campaign, when he featured in 14 out of 30 league contests to help the Merengues to a third national championship in a row; on 11 May 1966, he appeared in one of his 18 European Cup matches, helping his team win that year's continental competition with a 2–1 triumph over FK Partizan.

== International career ==
Araquistáin earned six caps for Spain. He made his debut on 17 July 1960 in a 4–1 friendly win with Chile in Santiago, and was part of the squad that competed at the 1962 FIFA World Cup.

In the tournament, also held in Chile, Araquistáin played in the 2–1 group stage loss to Brazil, in an eventual group stage exit. It was to be his last international appearance.

== Later life and death ==
Subsequently, Araquistáin represented Elche CF and CD Castellón, playing in the top flight with both sides and also attaining promotion from Segunda División with the latter. He retired in 1973, at the age of 36.

Araquistáin died in September 2025, at the age of 88.

== Honours ==
Real Madrid

- La Liga: 1961–62, 1962–63, 1963–64, 1964–65, 1966–67, 1967–68
- Copa del Generalísimo: 1961–62
- European Cup: 1965–66

Individual

- Ricardo Zamora Trophy: 1961–62
