= Juan Seminario =

Peruvian footballer (born 1936)

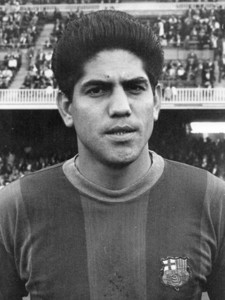

Personal information
- Full name: Juan Roberto Seminario Rodríguez
- Date of birth: 22 July 1936 (age 90)
- Place of birth: Piura, Peru
- Positions: Striker; left winger

Senior career*
Years	Team	Apps	(Gls)
1954–1959	Deportivo Municipal	80	(28)
1959–1961	Sporting CP	40	(17)
1961–1962	Zaragoza	38	(33)
1962–1964	Fiorentina	47	(15)
1964–1967	Barcelona	36	(15)
1967–1969	Sabadell	35	(9)
1969–1970	Atlético Grau		

International career
1956–1959	Peru	19	(6)
- * Club domestic league appearances and goals as of March 2008

Juan Roberto Seminario Rodríguez (born 22 July 1936) is a Peruvian former football player, recognized as one of Peru's most important strikers. Nicknamed "El Loco" he is the only Zaragoza player to have won the "Pichichi Trophy" (1961–62 La Liga).

He played for several clubs, notably Spanish clubs Real Zaragoza and FC Barcelona, Sporting CP of Portugal, as well as Italian club Fiorentina. He also won the 1965–66 Inter-Cities Fairs Cup with FC Barcelona.

== Career ==
Seminario started his career in 1954 playing for Deportivo Municipal where he played until 1959. During this time he made 19 appearances for the Peru national team. On 17 May 1959 he scored a hat-trick against England in a 4–1 win, in Lima.

In 1959 he moved to Europe, joining Sporting CP of Portugal, where he would play 50 matches and score 21 goals, and be nicknamed Expresso de Lima.

In 1961 he moved on to join Real Zaragoza in Spain where he became the top scorer in La Liga (with 25 goals in 30 matches) for the 1961–62 season. Before he was sold to Italy, he would play 8 matches and score 8 goals in the Zaragoza.

In 1963 he joined Fiorentina of Italy before returning to Spain in 1964 to play for Barcelona where he was part of the squad that won the Inter-Cities Fairs Cup in 1965–66. He later had a spell with Sabadell before returning to Peru in 1969 to play for Atlético Grau.

== Career statistics ==
=== Club ===
Club performance			League		Cup		Continental		Total
Season	Club	Country	Apps	Goals	Apps	Goals	Apps	Goals	Apps	Goals
1954–1959	Deportivo Municipal	Peru	80	28	–	–	–	–	80	28
1959–1961	Sporting CP	Portugal	42	18	8	3	–	–	50	21
1961–1962	Real Zaragoza	Spain	38	33	9	3	2	0	49	36
1962–1964	Fiorentina	Italy	47	15	5	4	–	–	52	19
1964–1967	FC Barcelona	Spain	36	15	2	1	8	4	46	20
1967–1969	CE Sabadell FC	Spain	35	9	?	?	–	–	35	9
1969–1970	Atlético Grau	Peru	?	?	–	–	–	–	?	?
Total			278	118	24	11	10	4	312	133

=== International ===
Appearances and goals by national team and year
National team	Year	Apps	Goals
Peru	1956	5	0
Peru	1957	7	1
Peru	1958	–	
Peru	1959	7	5
Total		19	6

Scores and results list Peru's goal tally first, score column indicates score after each Seminario goal.

List of international goals scored by Passang Tshering
No.	Date	Venue	Opponent	Score	Result	Competition	Ref.
1	23 March 1957	National Stadium of Peru, Lima, Peru	Uruguay	2–5	3–5	1957 South American Championship	
2	10 March 1959	Estadio Monumental, Buenos Aires, Argentina	Brazil	1–2	2–2	1959 South American Championship	
3	10 March 1959	Estadio Monumental, Buenos Aires, Argentina	Brazil	2–2	2–2	1959 South American Championship	
4	17 May 1959	National Stadium of Peru, Lima, Peru	England	1–0	4–1	Friendly	
5	17 May 1959	National Stadium of Peru, Lima, Peru	England	2–0	4–1	Friendly	
6	17 May 1959	National Stadium of Peru, Lima, Peru	England	4–1	4–1	Friendly	

== Honours ==
=== Player ===
==== Club ====
FC Barcelona

- Inter-Cities Fairs Cup: 1965–66

==== Individual ====
- Pichichi Trophy: 1961–62
