= Pedro Casado =

Spanish footballer (1937–2021)

Personal information
- Full name: Pedro Casado Bucho
- Date of birth: 20 November 1937
- Place of birth: Madrid, Spain
- Date of death: 10 January 2021 (aged 83)
- Position: Defender

Youth career
- Real Madrid

Senior career*
Years	Team	Apps	(Gls)
1956–1966	Real Madrid	83	(0)
1957–1960	→ Plus Ultra (loan)	71	(2)
1966–1969	Sabadell	24	(1)
1970–1971	Toluca		
Total		178	(3)

International career
1961	Spain	1	(0)
- * Club domestic league appearances and goals

Pedro Casado Bucho (20 November 1937 – 10 January 2021) was a Spanish footballer who played as a defender.

== Club career ==
Casado spent one full decade under contract to Real Madrid, but only played seven La Liga seasons effectively with the team. He won 11 major titles during his spell, including six national championships (five consecutive) and two European Cups, even though he did not appear in any games in the latter competition in the victorious campaigns (1956–57 and 1965–66).

Casado played three more seasons in the top flight with CE Sabadell FC – no matches in his last year – following which he moved to amateur football with Club Deportivo Toluca in Santander, retiring from the game in 1971 at the age of 33.

== International career ==
Casado gained one cap for Spain, appearing in a 2–0 friendly win over France on 2 April 1961, in his hometown of Madrid.

== Honours ==
Real Madrid

- European Cup: 1956–57, 1965–66
- Intercontinental Cup: 1960
- La Liga: 1956–57, 1960–61, 1961–62, 1962–63, 1963–64, 1964–65
- Copa del Rey: 1961–62
- Latin Cup: 1957
