= Vicente Miera =

Spanish football player and manager (born 1940)

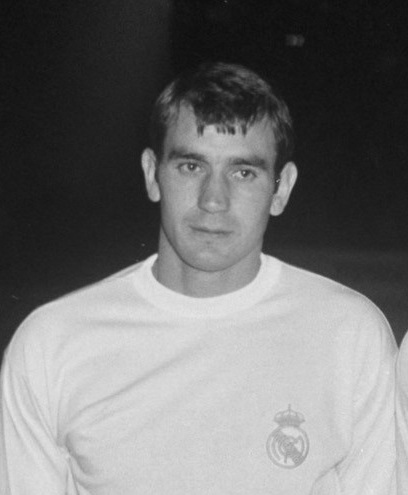
- Miera with Real Madrid in 1965

Personal information
- Full name: Vicente Miera Campos
- Date of birth: 10 May 1940 (age 86)
- Place of birth: Nueva Montaña, Spain
- Height: 1.78 m (5 ft 10 in)
- Position: Defender

Youth career
- Nueva Montaña
- Racing Santander

Senior career*
Years	Team	Apps	(Gls)
1957–1960	Rayo Cantabria		
1960–1961	Racing Santander	34	(1)
1961–1969	Real Madrid	95	(1)
1969–1971	Sporting Gijón	23	(0)
Total		152	(2)

International career
1961	Spain B	1	(0)
1961	Spain	1	(0)

Managerial career
- 1973–1974: Langreo
- 1974–1976: Oviedo
- 1976–1979: Sporting Gijón
- 1979–1980: Español
- 1980–1982: Sporting Gijón
- 1982–1986: Spain (assistant)
- 1986: Atlético Madrid
- 1987–1989: Oviedo
- 1989–1990: Tenerife
- 1991–1992: Spain
- 1992: Spain U23
- 1994–1996: Racing Santander
- 1997: Espanyol
- 1997: Sevilla
Medal record
Olympic medal record
Representing Spain
Men's Football
Gold medal – first place	1992 Barcelona	Team competition
- * Club domestic league appearances and goals

Vicente Miera Campos (born 10 May 1940) is a Spanish former professional football defender and manager.

He appeared in 139 La Liga games over ten seasons and scored two goals, mainly at the service of Real Madrid. Later, he embarked on a managerial career that lasted more than 25 years, and included a brief spell with the Spain national team.

== Playing career ==
Born in the neighbourhood of Nueva Montaña in Santander, Cantabria, Miera played two seasons with his hometown club Racing de Santander, one in each major division, signing for Real Madrid in 1961. Never an undisputed starter safe for the 1964–65 season, he was part of the latter's squads as they claimed seven La Liga titles, adding the European Cup in 1965–66 (he did not take part in the final against FK Partizan itself, but played both legs of the preliminary round and the first round); he made 147 appearances in an eight-year stint.

Miera joined Sporting de Gijón in summer 1969, helping it promote to the top tier in his first year and retiring the following season aged 31. He won his sole cap for Spain on 10 December 1961, in a 1–1 friendly draw in France.

== Coaching career ==
A manager since 1974, Miera started at the professional level with Real Oviedo, suffering top-flight relegation in his second season, then moved to neighbours Sporting where he would remain for five years, except for the 1979–80 campaign at RCD Español. He worked in both major divisions for more than 20 years, his last stop being Sevilla FC (Segunda División, in 1997–98).

Miera oversaw Sporting's first-ever qualification for the UEFA Cup in 1978–79, following a fifth-place finish in the league. They disposed of Torino FC in the first round, being ousted by Red Star Belgrade 2–1 on aggregate in the next stage.

Having already served as assistant for four years, Miera was handed the reins of the national team in 1991, remaining there seven months as the nation failed to qualify for UEFA Euro 1992 and stepping down due to health problems, being replaced by Javier Clemente. That summer, he switched to the Olympic squad, leading them to the gold medal in Barcelona.

== Honours ==
=== Player ===
Racing Santander

- Segunda División: 1959–60

Real Madrid

- La Liga: 1961–62, 1962–63, 1963–64, 1964–65, 1966–67, 1967–68, 1968–69
- Copa del Generalísimo: 1961–62
- European Cup: 1965–66

Sporting Gijón

- Segunda División: 1969–70

=== Manager ===
Oviedo

- Segunda División: 1974–75

Sporting Gijón

- Segunda División: 1976–77

Spain

- Summer Olympic Games: 1992
