= Justo Tejada =

Spanish footballer (1933–2021)

Personal information
- Full name: Justo Tejada Martínez
- Date of birth: 6 January 1933
- Place of birth: Barcelona, Spain
- Date of death: 31 January 2021 (aged 88)
- Place of death: Barcelona, Spain
- Height: 1.71 m (5 ft 7 in)
- Position: Forward

Youth career
- Europa
- Barcelona

Senior career*
Years	Team	Apps	(Gls)
1951–1952	España Industrial		
1952–1961	Barcelona	149	(73)
1952–1953	→ Murcia (loan)		
1961–1963	Real Madrid	33	(10)
1963–1965	Espanyol	16	(2)

International career
1954–1960	Spain B	6	(5)
1958–1961	Spain	8	(4)
1954–1960	Catalan XI	3	(1)
- * Club domestic league appearances and goals

Justo Tejada Martínez (6 January 1933 – 31 January 2021) was a Spanish footballer who played as a forward. He was capped by Spain on 8 occasions, scoring 4 goals. He died on 31 January 2021.

== Career ==
Born in Barcelona, Catalonia, Tejada began playing football with the youth side of CE Europa. He played professionally with FC Barcelona, where he won La Liga and the Copa del Rey.

== Honours ==
=== Club ===
Barcelona

- La Liga: 1958–59, 1959–60
- Copa del Generalísimo: 1957, 1958–59
- Inter-Cities Fairs Cup: 1955–58, 1958–60

Real Madrid

- La Liga: 1961–62, 1962–63
- Copa del Generalísimo: 1961–62
