= Manolete (footballer) =

Spanish footballer (born 1945)

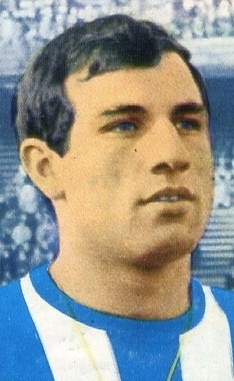

Personal information
- Full name: Manuel Ríos Quintanilla
- Date of birth: 20 May 1945 (age 81)
- Place of birth: A Coruña, Galicia, Spain
- Position: Midfielder

Youth career
- Perseverancio de Santo Tomás
- Deportivo Ciudad

Senior career*
Years	Team	Apps	(Gls)
1960–1961	Deportivo Fabril		
1961–1972	La Coruña	216	(16)
1972–1973	Valencia	5	(0)
1973–1974	Hércules	24	(0)
1974–1975	Valencia	0	(0)

International career
1972	Spain	2	(0)
- * Club domestic league appearances and goals

Manuel Ríos Quintanilla (born 20 May 1945) is a Spanish retired footballer. Nicknamed Manolete, he played as a midfielder for La Coruña, Valencia and Hércules. He was primarily recognized for his odd areer as despite finding initial success with La Coruña, would experience a series of misfortunes in his later career which prevented him from achieving his true potential. He would also briefly represent his home country of Spain in two matches in 1972.

== Club career ==
He would begin his youth career by playing for Perseverancio de Santo Tomás after playing for a local club known as Promesas before later playing for Deportivo Ciudad. He would catch the interest of Deportivo de La Coruña and would sign him up to play in their reserve club of Deportivo Fabril for the 1961–62 Tercera División. His successes as a youth would impress the senior club to where he would begin playing for them beginning in the 1962–63 La Liga where the club would get relegated for the 1963–64 Segunda División. His official debut for the club would occur in a match against Celta de Vigo where La Coruña would win 2–0. Ríos' play would emphasize on strong routes and distribution, becoming a prized player for the club. By 1968, he was made captain for the club as this was around the time that Valencia would begin making offers for him to play for the club. Initially, he'd refuse to give in as he wanted to remain with La Coruña.

This would last until the 1971–72 La Liga as he would then play for Valencia in the following season. Unfortunately, he would be injured during his first training session with the club but would choose to not undergo surgery for the upcoming second match against Barcelona. During the match, Ríos would score a goal that would be annulled by the referee for no reason and later in the match, he would receive a clavicle fracture by Antoni Torres. He would recover three weeks later for the upcoming match against Real Madrid but his misfortune would only continue as he would miss a goal attempt that would ultimately cost the team the match. With his knee being injured and his opportunities at Valencia becoming increasingly limited, an offer by Hércules manager Arsenio Iglesias would convince him to play for his club with his results improving with more matches played in the 1973–74 Segunda División where the club would be promoted back to La Liga.

Despite his injury not recovering completely and having to undergo another surgery, he would return to Valencia for the 1974–75 La Liga but despite being in seemingly perfect condition, wouldn't see himself play in any matches and would announce an early retirement mid-season. The remainder of his careers in relation to football would involve him returning to La Coruña as an assistant technical director. Despite his difficult predicaments in his later career, Ríos would have a clean career as a footballer, only being expulsed once in a match against Racing de Ferrol after one of his opponents would insult and even slap him.

== International career ==
Ríos briefly represented his home country of Spain in two matches in 1972. His first match was during the UEFA Euro 1972 qualifiers against Northern Ireland on 16 February 1972 and his second match was in a friendly against Greece. He would be the last footballer from the city of A Coruña to play internationally.

== Personal life ==
Ríos would later marry Mari Carme Vila and would later have five children together: Fernanda, Marimar, Víctor, Carolina and David along with seven grandchildren. He currently works within youth football as a local instructor and coach. He is also currently the president of an organization composed of former Deportivo de la Coruña players known as "Veteranos del Deportivo".
