= José Domínguez Rial =

Spanish footballer (1940–2000)

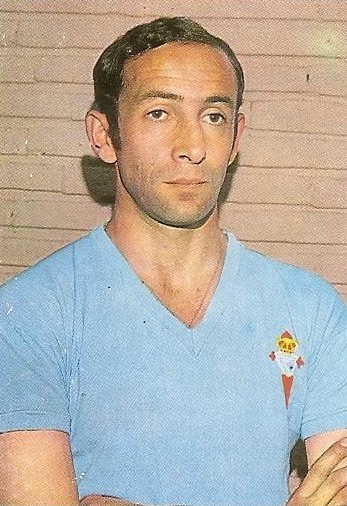

Personal information
- Full name: José Domínguez Rial
- Date of birth: 11 November 1940
- Place of birth: Vigo, Galicia, Spain
- Date of death: 29 June 2000 (aged 59)
- Place of death: Location unknown
- Position: Defender

Youth career
- Celta de Vigo

Senior career*
Years	Team	Apps	(Gls)
1959–1960	Celta de Vigo	1	(0)
1960–1971	Deportivo La Coruña	323	(1)
1971–1974	Celta de Vigo	50	(2)
- * Club domestic league appearances and goals

José Domínguez Rial (11 November 1940 – 29 June 2000) was a Spanish footballer. Nicknamed "Pepiño" or known simply as Domínguez, he played for Deportivo La Coruña throughout the 1960s as well as with Celta de Vigo in the early 1970s.

== Club career ==
Domínguez would begin his career by playing within the youth sectors of Celta de Vigo until making his official senior debut for the club in 1959 at the age of 19. However, he would have difficulties making himself part of the starting XI in the club's lineups during the 1959–60 Segunda División, being primarily relegated as a substitute. Because of his own personal ambitions, he would switch to play for Deportivo La Coruña in the subsequent season where he would gain significantly more success and recognition. He was primarily known as the "club's player" where he would provide excellent control of the club's defense and midfield which resulted in him playing in nearly every match while he was with the club. Over the course of his time with La Coruña, he would oversee the club be promoted and relegated five times as he would make 323 appearances for the club. He returned to Celta de Vigo for the 1971–72 La Liga until his retirement following the 1973–74 La Liga. During his tenure with the club, he would play in the club's first international European competition in the form of the 1971–72 UEFA Cup where the club would only make the first round, being knocked out by Aberdeen. In total, he would play in fifty matches and scored two goals.
