= Isidro Sánchez (footballer, born 1936) =

Spanish footballer

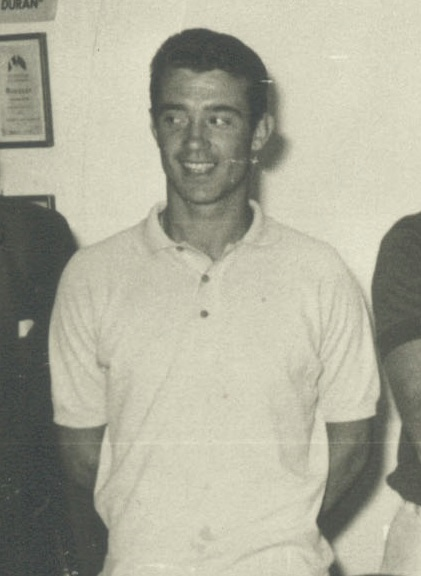
- Sánchez in 1963

Personal information
- Full name: Isidro Sánchez García-Figueras
- Date of birth: 17 December 1936
- Place of birth: Barcelona, Spain
- Date of death: 2 September 2013 (aged 76)
- Place of death: Seville, Spain
- Position: Right-back

Youth career
- Hércules Jerez
- San Eloy

Senior career*
Years	Team	Apps	(Gls)
1955–1956	Utrera		
1956–1961	Betis	67	(6)
1956–1957	→ CD Puerto (loan)		
1961–1965	Real Madrid	71	(0)
1965–1971	Sabadell	142	(1)
Total		280	(7)

International career
1959	Spain U21	1	(0)
- * Club domestic league appearances and goals

Isidro Sánchez García-Figueras (17 December 1936 – 2 September 2013) was a Spanish footballer who played as a right-back.

== Club career ==
During his 15-year professional career, Barcelona-born Sánchez played for three clubs. He started out in 1956 at Real Betis, scoring a career-best five goals – in only 15 matches – in his fourth season and helping the Andalusians to the sixth place in La Liga, while playing as a midfielder.

In 1961, Sánchez joined fellow top-tier team Real Madrid, being an important defensive unit as they won four consecutive league titles, including the double in his first year. After only one game in the 1964–65 campaign, aged 28, he returned to his native region and signed for CE Sabadell FC, where he would remain until his retirement in June 1971.

Sánchez never suffered relegation since arriving in the top division, making 262 appearances in the competition. He died on 2 September 2013 at 76, in Seville.

== Personal life ==
Sánchez was married to Carmen Flores, sister of flamenco singer-dancer Lola Flores. His son Enrique was also a footballer and a defender, representing mainly Valencia CF and Real Madrid and later embarking in a successful coaching career.
