= Felo (footballer, born 1936) =

Spanish footballer

Personal information
- Full name: Rafael Batista Hernández
- Date of birth: 24 October 1936 (age 90)
- Place of birth: Las Palmas, Canary Islands, Spain
- Position: Midfielder

Youth career
- Las Palmas

Senior career*
Years	Team	Apps	(Gls)
1956–1960	Las Palmas	57	(7)
1960–1965	Real Madrid	21	(0)
1965–1967	Sevilla	23	(2)
- * Club domestic league appearances and goals

Rafael Batista Hernández (born 24 October 1936), also known as Felo, is a Spanish former professional footballer who played as a midfielder.

Born in Las Palmas, Canary Islands, he played for UD Las Palmas, Real Madrid and Sevilla. He scored Real's only goal at 1964 European Cup Final.

== Club career ==
Club	Country	Years	League apps	League goals
Las Palmas	Spain	1956–1960	57	7
Real Madrid	Spain	1961–1965	21	0
Sevilla	Spain	1965–1967	23	2
