= 1961–62 La Liga =

31st season of La Liga

Primera División
- Season: 1961–62
- Champions: Real Madrid (8th title)
- Relegated: Español; Real Santander; Real Sociedad; Tenerife
- European Cup: Real Madrid
- European Cup Winners' Cup: Sevilla; Atlético Madrid (as title holders)
- Matches: 240
- Goals: 761 (3.17 per match)
- Top goalscorer: Juan Seminario (25 goals)
- Biggest home win: Barcelona 8–0 Real Santander
- Biggest away win: Mallorca 1–5 Español; Osasuna 0–4 Atlético Bilbao
- Highest scoring: Zaragoza 6–3 Osasuna; Zaragoza 6–3 Real Sociedad
- Longest winning run: 8 matches Real Madrid
- Longest unbeaten run: 9 matches Barcelona
- Longest winless run: 8 matches Español
- Longest losing run: 5 matches Real Sociedad; Tenerife

The 1961–62 La Liga was the 31st season since its establishment. The season began on 2 September 1961, and concluded on 1 April 1962.

== Team locations ==
Location of teams in the 1961–62 La Liga
Canary Islands

Tenerife made their debut in La Liga, thus becoming the second Canarian team to play in the top tier.

Team	Home city	Stadium
Atlético Bilbao	Bilbao	San Mamés
Atlético Madrid	Madrid	Metropolitano
Barcelona	Barcelona	Nou Camp
Elche	Elche	Altabix
Español	Barcelona	Sarriá
Mallorca	Palma	Lluís Sitjar
Osasuna	Pamplona	San Juan
Oviedo	Oviedo	Carlos Tartiere
Real Betis	Seville	Benito Villamarín
Real Madrid	Madrid	Santiago Bernabéu
Real Santander	Santander, Spain	El Sardinero
Real Sociedad	San Sebastián	Atocha
Sevilla	Seville	Ramón Sánchez Pizjuán
Tenerife	Santa Cruz de Tenerife	Heliodoro Rodríguez López
Valencia	Valencia	Mestalla
Zaragoza	Zaragoza	La Romareda

== League table ==
Pos	Team	Pld	W	D	L	GF	GA	GD	Pts	Qualification or relegation
1	Real Madrid (C)	30	19	5	6	58	24	+34	43	Qualified for the European Cup
2	Barcelona	30	18	4	8	81	46	+35	40	Invited for the Inter-Cities Fairs Cup
3	Atlético Madrid (Note: Atlético Madrid qualified to the Cup Winners' Cup as title holders.)	30	15	6	9	50	36	+14	36	Qualified for the Cup Winners' Cup
4	Zaragoza	30	15	5	10	70	51	+19	35	Invited for the Inter-Cities Fairs Cup
5	Atlético Bilbao	30	12	8	10	52	38	+14	32	
6	Sevilla (Note: Sevilla qualified to the Cup Winners' Cup as runners-up of the Copa del Generalísimo, due to the qualification of Real Madrid to the European Cup.)	30	12	7	11	48	45	+3	31	Qualified for the Cup Winners' Cup
7	Valencia (Note: Valencia qualified to the Inter-Cities Fairs Cup as title holders.)	30	12	7	11	50	50	0	31	Invited for the Inter-Cities Fairs Cup
8	Elche	30	10	9	11	52	52	0	29	
9	Real Betis	30	10	8	12	39	51	−12	28	
10	Oviedo	30	10	7	13	27	47	−20	27	
11	Osasuna	30	11	5	14	30	47	−17	27	
12	Mallorca	30	10	7	13	54	59	−5	27	
13	Español (R)	30	8	10	12	45	55	−10	26	Qualified for the relegation play-offs
14	Real Santander (R)	30	11	4	15	35	54	−19	26	Qualified for the relegation play-offs
15	Real Sociedad (R)	30	9	5	16	37	49	−12	23	Relegated to the Segunda División
16	Tenerife (R)	30	6	7	17	33	57	−24	19	Relegated to the Segunda División

Source: BDFútbol
Rules for classification: 1) Points; 2) Head-to-head results; 3) Goal difference; 4) Number of goals scored
(C) Champions; (R) Relegated

== Results ==
Home \ Away	ATB	ATM	BAR	ELC	ESP	MLL	OSA	OVI	BET	RMA	RSA	RSO	SEV	TFE	VAL	ZAR
Atlético Bilbao	—	5–1	3–2	1–1	1–2	3–0	0–0	0–1	1–0	0–2	0–1	3–3	5–1	5–0	0–0	1–0
Atlético Madrid	2–0	—	1–1	5–2	5–2	1–1	4–2	5–1	1–0	1–0	1–0	1–0	4–0	1–0	0–0	3–0
Barcelona	4–2	5–1	—	3–2	2–0	3–2	3–1	4–1	6–1	3–1	8–0	5–0	3–2	5–2	4–0	1–1
Elche	2–2	1–2	1–2	—	6–2	2–0	6–2	1–1	1–1	0–0	2–1	4–2	1–0	3–0	2–1	5–3
Español	0–3	3–0	1–1	0–0	—	0–2	3–0	1–1	2–2	1–1	3–2	2–2	0–1	2–0	2–2	1–3
Mallorca	1–3	0–3	3–1	3–1	1–5	—	2–0	2–0	1–0	0–2	0–0	1–0	3–2	1–1	3–0	1–0
Osasuna	0–4	3–1	3–1	3–0	2–2	4–1	—	2–2	4–0	1–3	2–1	0–1	1–3	3–1	5–2	5–1
Oviedo	0–1	0–0	0–2	1–1	1–0	1–0	2–0	—	1–1	1–0	2–1	1–0	1–1	1–0	1–0	0–2
Real Betis	1–1	2–1	2–3	5–1	3–3	0–1	1–1	2–0	—	2–1	1–0	2–1	3–1	2–0	3–1	2–2
Real Madrid	3–0	2–1	2–0	3–1	3–1	2–0	2–2	4–1	2–0	—	6–0	1–0	2–1	0–0	4–1	2–1
Real Santander	2–0	1–0	1–1	3–1	1–3	4–0	1–3	3–0	1–0	0–2	—	1–0	1–1	0–0	4–1	2–1
Real Sociedad	0–2	1–0	2–1	2–1	0–1	0–0	1–1	2–0	6–0	0–1	3–0	—	4–1	0–1	1–1	1–0
Sevilla	2–1	1–1	1–0	2–0	3–1	0–0	0–0	3–1	1–2	1–1	3–1	3–0	—	2–1	2–0	4–0
Tenerife	1–1	0–2	1–3	1–3	0–0	3–0	3–1	1–4	1–1	0–3	0–0	4–1	3–3	—	2–1	4–2
Valencia	2–2	2–1	6–2	0–0	4–2	3–1	2–0	3–0	2–0	3–2	2–1	5–1	2–1	2–1	—	1–1
Zaragoza	4–2	1–1	3–2	1–1	3–0	3–0	6–3	5–1	4–0	2–1	6–1	6–3	3–2	3–1	3–0	—

Source: BDFútbol
Legend: Blue = home team win; Yellow = draw; Red = away team win.

== Relegation play-offs ==
Team 1	Agg.	Team 2	1st leg	2nd leg
Español	1–2	Valladolid	1–0	0–2
Málaga	3–1	Real Santander	3–0	0–1

== Pichichi Trophy ==
Rank	Player	Club	Goals
1	(Peru) Juan Seminario	Zaragoza	25
2	(Brazil) Evaristo	Barcelona	20
2	(Spain) Ferenc Puskás	Real Madrid	20
4	(Paraguay) Juan Romero Isasi	Elche	18
5	(Hungary) Sándor Kocsis	Barcelona	17
5	(Spain) Joaquín Murillo	Zaragoza	17
