= 1962–63 La Liga =

32nd season of La Liga

Primera División
- Season: 1962–63
- Champions: Real Madrid (9th title)
- Relegated: Mallorca; Deportivo La Coruña; Osasuna; Málaga
- European Cup: Real Madrid
- Cup Winners' Cup: Barcelona
- Matches: 240
- Goals: 744 (3.1 per match)
- Top goalscorer: Ferenc Puskás (26 goals)
- Biggest home win: Elche 8–1 Sevilla
- Biggest away win: Málaga 0–7 Barcelona
- Highest scoring: Málaga 4–6 Elche

The 1962–63 La Liga was the 32nd season since its establishment. The season began on 16 September 1962, and concluded on 21 April 1963.

== Team locations ==
Location of teams in 1962–63 La Liga

Team	Home city	Stadium
Atlético Bilbao	Bilbao	San Mamés
Atlético Madrid	Madrid	Metropolitano
Barcelona	Barcelona	Nou Camp
Córdoba	Córdoba	El Arcángel
Deportivo La Coruña	A Coruña	Estadio Riazor
Elche	Elche	Altabix
Málaga	Málaga	La Rosaleda
Mallorca	Palma	Lluís Sitjar
Osasuna	Pamplona	San Juan
Oviedo	Oviedo	Carlos Tartiere
Real Betis	Seville	Benito Villamarín
Real Madrid	Madrid	Santiago Bernabéu
Sevilla	Seville	Ramón Sánchez Pizjuán
Valencia	Valencia	Mestalla
Valladolid	Valladolid	José Zorrilla
Zaragoza	Zaragoza	La Romareda

== League table ==
Pos	Team	Pld	W	D	L	GF	GA	GD	Pts	Qualification or relegation
1	Real Madrid (C)	30	23	3	4	83	33	+50	49	Qualification for the European Cup preliminary round
2	Atlético Madrid	30	14	9	7	61	36	+25	37	Invited for the Inter-Cities Fairs Cup
3	Oviedo	30	15	3	12	52	46	+6	33	
4	Valladolid	30	15	3	12	51	53	−2	33	
5	Zaragoza	30	14	4	12	54	39	+15	32	Invited for the Inter-Cities Fairs Cup
6	Barcelona	30	11	9	10	45	36	+9	31	Qualification for the Cup Winners' Cup first round (Note: Barcelona qualified to the Cup Winners' Cup as champions of the Copa del Generalísimo.)
7	Valencia	30	14	3	13	49	36	+13	31	Invited for the Inter-Cities Fairs Cup
8	Elche	30	11	7	12	48	59	−11	29	
9	Real Betis	30	12	4	14	41	47	−6	28	
10	Atlético Bilbao	30	10	8	12	41	40	+1	28	
11	Sevilla	30	11	5	14	40	55	−15	27	
12	Córdoba	30	12	3	15	35	39	−4	27	
13	Mallorca (R)	30	11	4	15	47	57	−10	26	Qualification for the relegation play-offs
14	Deportivo La Coruña (R)	30	11	3	16	33	48	−15	25	Qualification for the relegation play-offs
15	Osasuna (R)	30	9	6	15	39	50	−11	24	Relegation to the Segunda División
16	Málaga (R)	30	8	4	18	25	70	−45	20	Relegation to the Segunda División

Source: BDFútbol
Rules for classification: 1) Points; 2) Head-to-head results; 3) Goal difference; 4) Number of goals scored
(C) Champions; (R) Relegated

== Results ==
Home \ Away	ATB	ATM	BAR	COR	DEP	ELC	MGA	MLL	OSA	OVI	BET	RMA	SEV	VAL	VAD	ZAR
Atlético Bilbao	—	0–0	2–3	3–1	1–3	2–1	3–0	5–3	2–2	3–1	0–0	0–1	2–0	2–1	3–0	0–2
Atlético Madrid	2–0	—	4–2	2–0	3–1	1–1	5–0	6–1	3–0	0–0	3–0	1–1	2–0	5–1	5–2	2–1
Barcelona	0–0	0–0	—	2–1	5–2	4–0	4–0	1–1	0–0	2–1	1–0	1–5	0–0	1–1	2–1	0–0
Córdoba	1–2	1–1	1–2	—	3–1	5–0	3–1	1–2	3–0	4–0	1–0	1–1	0–0	1–0	1–0	1–0
Deportivo La Coruña	0–1	1–1	1–0	2–0	—	1–1	3–2	1–0	3–1	2–1	2–1	1–3	1–0	0–0	1–0	0–2
Elche	1–1	2–1	1–1	0–1	3–0	—	0–2	2–2	2–1	2–1	0–3	0–2	8–1	2–0	2–3	2–1
Málaga	2–0	1–1	0–7	1–0	1–0	4–6	—	2–1	2–0	1–3	1–1	0–4	1–0	0–2	1–1	1–1
Mallorca	1–0	4–0	2–0	2–0	3–1	0–1	5–0	—	0–0	3–0	1–2	5–2	1–0	0–2	0–0	2–1
Osasuna	1–0	1–4	3–1	3–0	1–0	3–0	3–0	4–1	—	2–3	3–2	1–1	0–0	0–1	4–1	1–2
Oviedo	1–1	3–0	3–1	2–0	1–0	6–1	2–0	2–0	1–1	—	4–3	0–1	5–1	2–0	4–0	1–0
Real Betis	3–2	1–0	1–1	1–0	4–0	2–3	0–1	2–1	2–1	2–1	—	2–5	2–1	2–0	2–2	2–0
Real Madrid	3–2	4–3	2–0	1–0	2–1	6–1	5–0	5–2	5–0	2–1	3–0	—	2–1	1–0	4–1	4–2
Sevilla	1–1	2–4	1–0	3–1	3–2	2–2	2–1	2–1	2–1	2–3	2–0	0–5	—	3–1	3–2	3–1
Valencia	2–0	3–0	0–3	0–1	0–1	2–2	2–0	7–2	4–1	5–0	5–0	2–1	1–0	—	5–3	2–1
Valladolid	2–1	2–1	1–0	6–0	3–1	0–2	2–0	2–0	2–1	2–0	1–0	4–2	3–1	1–0	—	2–1
Zaragoza	2–2	1–1	2–1	1–3	2–1	1–0	4–0	6–1	3–0	5–0	2–1	1–0	2–4	1–0	6–2	—

Source: BDFútbol
Legend: Blue = home team win; Yellow = draw; Red = away team win.

== Relegation play-offs ==
Español won their series against Mallorca after a tie-break match where Catalans won by 1–0.

Team 1	Agg.	Team 2	1st leg	2nd leg
Español	3–3	Mallorca	2–1	1–2
Deportivo La Coruña	2–4	Levante	1–2	1–2

== Pichichi Trophy ==
Rank	Player	Club	Goals
1	(Spain) Ferenc Puskás	Real Madrid	26
2	(Spain) Delio Morollón	Valladolid	20
3	(Spain) José María Rodilla	Valladolid	16
4	(Spain) Amancio Amaro	Real Madrid	14
4	(Spain) Luis Aragonés	Real Betis	14
