= 1961–62 Copa del Generalísimo =

60th Copa del Rey

Tournament details
- Country: Spain
- Teams: 48

Final positions
- Champions: Real Madrid (10th title)
- Runners-up: Sevilla

Tournament statistics
- Matches played: 101

The 1961–62 Copa del Generalísimo was the 60th staging of the Spanish Cup. The competition began on 12 November 1961 and ended on 8 July 1962 with the final.

== First round ==
Team 1	Agg.	Team 2	1st leg	2nd leg
CD Alavés	5–4	Cádiz CF	4–0	1–4
CD Basconia	2–2	Cartagena CF	2–1	0–1
Burgos CF	5–4	CD Mestalla	2–1	3–3
Celta Vigo	6–3	Córdoba CF	6–1	0–2
Deportivo La Coruña	6–2	Recreativo de Huelva	5–0	1–2
Real Gijón	2–3	Real Murcia	1–0	1–3
Hércules CF	5–3	AD Plus Ultra	4–1	1–2
Real Jaén	1–5	San Sebastián CF	1–2	0–3
UD Las Palmas	1–4	CD Sabadell CF	1–1	0–3
Levante UD	3–5	Pontevedra CF	3–0	0–5
Cultural Leonesa	3–7	Granada CF	2–4	1–3
CD Málaga	4–3	SD Indauchu	4–0	0–3
CD Orense	3–0	Albacete Balompié	3–0	0–0
UD Salamanca	2–3	CA Ceuta	2–1	0–2
CD San Fernando	1–2	Real Valladolid	1–0	0–2
CD Villarrobledo	2–2	Atlético Baleares	2–1	0–1

Source: RSSSF

- Tiebreaker:

Team 1	Score	Team 2
CD Basconia	1–0	Cartagena CF
CD Villarrobledo	1–3	Atlético Baleares

== Round of 32 ==
Team 1	Agg.	Team 2	1st leg	2nd leg
CD Alavés	5–3	Real Sociedad	3–2	2–1
Club Atlético de Bilbao	7–3	CD Sabadell	5–0	2–3
CA Ceuta	1–2	Valencia CF	1–0	0–2
Atlético de Madrid	3–3	CD Basconia	3–0	0–3
Deportivo La Coruña	2–6	CF Barcelona	1–3	1–3
Hércules CF	3–6	Real Betis Balompié	2–3	1–3
CD Málaga	6–6	CA Osasuna	4–0	2–6
RCD Mallorca	6–2	Pontevedra CF	4–1	2–1
Real Murcia	3–3	Real Oviedo	2–0	1–3
CD Orense	1–6	Elche CF	0–1	1–5
San Sebastián CF	1–8	Real Madrid CF	1–3	0–5
Real Santander	2–2	Burgos CF	1–0	1–2
Sevilla CF	3–2	Celta Vigo	2–0	1–2
CD Tenerife	3–1	Atlético Baleares	3–0	0–1
Real Valladolid	4–5	RCD Español	3–3	1–2
Real Zaragoza CD	7–3	Granada CF	5–1	2–2

- Tiebreaker:

Team 1	Score	Team 2
Atlético de Madrid	1–2	CD Basconia
CD Málaga	3–1	CA Osasuna
Real Murcia	0–3	Real Oviedo
Real Santander	2–1	Burgos CF

== Round of 16 ==
Team 1	Agg.	Team 2	1st leg	2nd leg
CD Basconia	1–12	CF Barcelona	0–2	1–10
Elche CF	4–9	Real Madrid CF	3–4	1–5
RCD Español	3–2	CD Alavés	2–0	1–2
CD Málaga	1–3	Club Atlético de Bilbao	1–1	0–2
RCD Mallorca	1–6	Valencia CF	0–2	1–4
Sevilla CF	5–4	Real Betis Balompié	5–3	0–1
CD Tenerife	3–2	Real Oviedo	3–0	0–2
Real Zaragoza CD	2–2	Real Santander	2–1	0–1

Source: RSSSF

- Tiebreaker:

Team 1	Score	Team 2
Real Zaragoza CD	4–2	Real Santander

== Quarter-finals ==
Team 1	Agg.	Team 2	1st leg	2nd leg
Club Atlético de Bilbao	2–3	Valencia CF	2–2	0–1
RCD Español	2–4	Real Zaragoza	1–1	1–3
Real Madrid CF	3–2	CF Barcelona	0–1	3–1
CD Tenerife	1–1	Sevilla CF	1–1	0–0

Source: RSSSF

- Tiebreaker:

Team 1	Score	Team 2
CD Tenerife	0–1	Sevilla CF

== Semi-finals ==
Team 1	Agg.	Team 2	1st leg	2nd leg
Valencia CF	2–5	Sevilla CF	2–2	0–3
Real Zaragoza CD	2–6	Real Madrid CF	1–2	1–4

Source: RSSSF

== Final ==
Team 1	Score	Team 2
Real Madrid CF	2–1	Sevilla CF

Copa del Generalísimo
winners
Real Madrid
10th title
