= 1960–61 Real Madrid CF season =

58th season in existence of Real Madrid CF

Real Madrid
1960–61 season
- President: Santiago Bernabéu
- Manager: Miguel Muñoz
- La Liga: 1st (in European Cup)
- Copa del Generalísimo: Runners-up
- European Cup: Round of 16
- Intercontinental Cup: Winners
- Top goalscorer: Puskás (28)
Home colours	Away colours	Third colours

The 1960–61 season was Real Madrid Club de Fútbol's 58th season in existence and the club's 29th consecutive season in the top flight of Spanish football.

Real Madrid won their 7th Primera División title, surpassing Athletic Bilbao for most title wins and behind only Barcelona with 8 titles.

== Summary ==
After winning the European Cup semi-finals and final last season, acting head coach "Miracle" Miguel Muñoz was promoted as full-time manager for this campaign. The team was defeated in the first round of the 1960–61 European Cup by FC Barcelona 3–4 on aggregate, now with László Kubala in the line-up, with the Catalans avenging a semi-finals defeat in the previous campaign months earlier.

With an early elimination in the European Cup, Madrid were aiming to clinch the domestic double, which was reachable. The club won its seventh league title (twelve points above runners-up Atlético Madrid and five matches before the season finale), and were then defeated in the Copa del Generalísino final for the second season in a row, again by Atlético Madrid. Puskas won the Pichichi individual award as the top goalscorer, with 28 league goals. At the start the campaign, Real Madrid clinched the first edition of the Intercontinental Cup, defeating Peñarol.

== Squad ==
Note: Flags indicate national team as defined under FIFA eligibility rules; some limited exceptions apply. Players may hold more than one non-FIFA nationality.

No.	Pos.	Nation	Player
—	GK	ESP	Vicente
—	GK	ARG	Rogelio Domínguez
—	DF	URU	José Santamaría
—	DF	ESP	Pedro Casado
—	DF	ESP	Pachín
—	DF	ESP	Marquitos
—	DF	ESP	Miche
—	MF	ESP	Luis Del Sol
—	MF	ESP	José María Vidal
—	MF	ESP	Antonio Ruiz
—	MF	ESP	Juan Santisteban

No.	Pos.	Nation	Player
—	MF	ESP	José María Zárraga
—	FW	ESP	Francisco Gento
—	FW	HUN	Ferenc Puskás
—	FW	ARG	Alfredo Di Stéfano
—	FW	BRA	Canário
—	FW	ESP	Jesús Herrera
—	FW	ESP	Manuel Bueno
—	FW	ESP	Pepillo
—	FW	SWE	Agne Simonsson
—	FW	ESP	Enrique Mateos
—	FW	ARG	José Héctor Rial

=== Transfers ===
In
Pos.	Name	From	Type
GK	Vicente	Espanyol	-
FW	Agne Simonsson	-	-
MF	Villa	Plus Ultra	-

Out
Pos.	Name	To	Type
MF	Didi	-	-
DF	Lesmes	Valladolid	-
DF	Pantaleon	Elche	-
MF	Falin		-
DF	Angel Atienza		-
GK	Berasaluce	Racing Santander	-
FW	Ramon Marsal	Plus Ultra	-
FW	Laszlo Kaszas	Racing Santander	-

== Competitions ==
=== La Liga ===
==== League table ====
Pos	Team	Pld	W	D	L	GF	GA	GD	Pts	Qualification or relegation
1	Real Madrid (C)	30	24	4	2	89	25	+64	52	Qualified for the European Cup
2	Atlético Madrid	30	17	6	7	57	35	+22	40	Qualified for the Cup Winners' Cup
3	Zaragoza	30	12	9	9	54	53	+1	33	
4	Barcelona	30	13	6	11	62	47	+15	32	Invited for the Inter-Cities Fairs Cup
5	Valencia	30	11	10	9	46	42	+4	32	Invited for the Inter-Cities Fairs Cup

Source: BDFútbol
Rules for classification: 1) Points; 2) Head-to-head results; 3) Goal difference; 4) Number of goals scored
(C) Champions

==== Position by round ====
Round	1	2	3	4	5	6	7	8	9	10	11	12	13	14	15	16	17	18	19	20	21	22	23	24	25	26	27	28	29	30
Ground	A	H	A	H	A	H	A	H	H	A	H	A	H	A	H	H	A	H	A	H	A	H	A	A	H	A	H	A	H	A
Result	L	W	W	W	W	D	W	W	W	D	W	W	W	W	W	W	W	W	W	W	W	W	W	W	W	D	W	L	W	D
Position	11	7	5	2	2	2	1	1	1	1	1	1	1	1	1	1	1	1	1	1	1	1	1	1	1	1	1	1	1	1

Source: www.lfp.es
A = Away; H = Home; W = Win; D = Draw; L = Loss; = Leader, 1961-62 European Cup

==== Matches ====
11 September 1960 1	Atlético Madrid	1–0	Real Madrid	Madrid
	Jones 84'	Report		Stadium: Metropolitano; Referee: Gomez Arribas

18 September 1960 2	Real Madrid	3–1	Real Sociedad	Madrid
	Puskás 9'; Pepillo 79'; Puskás 89'	Report	Olano 64'	Stadium: Chamartín; Referee: Ortiz de Mendibil

25 September 1960 3	Elche CF	3–4	Real Madrid	Elche
	Fuertes 17'; Romero 53' (pen.); Iborra 87'	Report	Ruiz 28'; Gento 39'; Pepillo 43'; Pepillo 72' (pen.)	Stadium: Campo de Altabix; Referee: Ortiz de Mendibil

2 October 1960 4	Real Madrid	2–0	Español	Madrid
	Del Sol 39'; Pepillo 51'	Report		Stadium: Chamartín; Referee: Blanco Perez

8 October 1960 5	Valencia CF	0–1	Real Madrid	Valencia
		Report	Puskás 39'	Stadium: Estadio Mestalla; Referee: Ortiz de Mendibil

16 October 1960 6	Real Madrid	1–1	Sevilla CF	Madrid
	Di Stéfano 54'	Report	Diéguez 13'	Stadium: Chamartín; Referee: Gonzalez Echeverria

23 October 1960 7	Granada CF	2–3	Real Madrid	Granada
	Arsenio Iglesias 61'; Carranza 89'	Report	Del Sol 15'; Puskás 50'; Di Stéfano 83'	Stadium: Los Cármenes; Referee: Birigay Nieva

6 November 1960 8	Real Madrid	3–1	Atletico de Bilbao	Madrid
	Gento 6'; Di Stéfano 10'; Santamaría 85'	Report	Koldo Aguirre 17'	Stadium: Chamartín; Referee: Lloris Antonino

13 November 1960 9	Real Madrid	5–1	Real Zaragoza	Madrid
	Puskás 26'; Puskás 28'; Simonsson 37'; Gento 42'; Puskás 89'	Report	Murillo 84'	Stadium: Chamartín; Referee: Gomez Contreras

20 November 1960 10	RCD Mallorca	1–1	Real Madrid	Palma de Mallorca
	Ruiz 81'	Report	Canario 65'	Stadium: Lluis Sitjar Stadium; Referee: Gardeazabal Garay

27 November 1960 11	Real Madrid	7–0	Real Oviedo	Madrid
	Del Sol 17'; Gento 25'; Del Sol 50'; Del Sol 63'; Puskás 64'; Puskás 80'; Gento 85'	Report		Stadium: Chamartín; Referee: Simo Fiol

4 December 1960 12	CF Barcelona	3–5	Real Madrid	Barcelona
	Eulogio Martinez 28'; Villaverde 34'; Kubala 89'	Report	Di Stéfano 3'; Luis del Sol 15'; Gento 43'; Gento 79'; Di Stéfano 81'	Stadium: Estadio del CF Barcelona; Referee: Gonzalez Echeverria

11 December 1960 13	Real Madrid	2–1	Real Valladolid	Madrid
	Puskás 77'; Gento 78'	Report	Morollón 9'	Stadium: Chamartín; Referee: Gomez Arribas

18 December 1960 14	Real Betis	0–5	Real Madrid	Seville
		Report	Gento 35'; Puskás 52'; Del Sol 68'; Di Stéfano 81'; Puskás 89'	Stadium: Heliópolis; Referee: Lloris Antonino

1 January 1961 15	Real Madrid	4–0	Racing Santander	Madrid
	Puskás 31'; Di Stéfano 59'; Del Sol 83'; Del Sol 85'	Report		Stadium: Chamartín; Referee: Saz Olmedo

8 January 1961 16	Real Madrid	3–1	Atlético Madrid	Madrid
	Puskás 3'; Del Sol 65'; Puskás 73'	Report	Griffa 29'	Stadium: Chamartín; Referee: Gonzalez Echeverria

15 January 1961 17	Real Sociedad	0–4	Real Madrid	San Sebastián
		Report	Canario 7'; Di Stéfano 34'; Del Sol 52'; Puskás 85'	Stadium: Atocha; Referee: Blanco Perez

22 January 1961 18	Real Madrid	8–0	Elche CF	Madrid
	Canario 17'; Di Stéfano 24'; Puskás 27'; Di Stéfano 28'; Puskás 37'; Puskás 48'; Puskás 65'; Canario 70'	Report		Stadium: Chamartín; Referee: Gomez Arribas

29 January 1961 19	Español	1–2	Real Madrid	Barcelona
	Indio 10'	Report	Puskás 51' (pen.); Del Sol 73'	Stadium: Sarrià; Referee: Blanco Pérez

4 February 1961 20	Real Madrid	2–0	Valencia CF	Madrid
	Di Stéfano 42'; Di Stéfano 77'	Report		Stadium: Chamartín; Referee: Rey Martínez

12 February 1961 21	Sevilla CF	0–2	Real Madrid	Seville
		Report	Di Stéfano 43'; Di Stéfano 66'	Stadium: Ramón Sánchez-Pizjuán; Referee: Gomez Arribas

19 February 1961 22	Real Madrid	5–0	Granada CF	Madrid
	Del Sol 4'; Di Stéfano 50'; Di Stéfano 64'; Di Stéfano 84'; Di Stéfano 87'	Report		Stadium: Chamartín; Referee: Gomez Arribas

26 February 1961 23	Athletic Bilbao	0–2	Real Madrid	Bilbao
		Report	Koldo Aguirre 84' (own goal); Puskás 88' (pen.)	Stadium: San Mamés; Referee: Lacambra Canela

5 March 1961 24	Real Zaragoza	2–3	Real Madrid	Zaragoza
	Miguel 4'; Murillo 59'	Report	Del Sol 6'; Di Stéfano 38'; Canario 64'; Casado 85'	Stadium: La Romareda; Referee: Gardeazabal Garay

12 March 1961 25	Real Madrid	3–0	Mallorca	Madrid
	Del Sol 3'; Del Sol 69'; Canario 74'; Pachín 86'	Report		Stadium: Chamartín

19 March 1961 26	Real Oviedo	0–0	Real Madrid	Oviedo
		Report		Stadium: Carlos Tartiere; Referee: Gonzalbez

26 March 1961 27	Real Madrid	3–2	CF Barcelona	Madrid
	Luis del Sol 55'; Di Stéfano 60'; Puskás 78'	Report	Luis Suarez 80'; Kubala 89'	Stadium: Chamartín; Referee: Gomez Arribas

9 April 1961 28	Real Valladolid	3–1	Real Madrid	Valladolid
	Endériz 47'; Zaldúa 60'; Morollón 75'	Report	Puskás 61'	Referee: Gonzalbez

23 April 1961 29	Real Madrid	4–0	Real Betis	Madrid
	Di Stéfano 32'; Puskás 64' (pen.); Puskás 85' (pen.); Puskás 89'	Report		Stadium: Chamartín; Referee: Lacambra Canela

30 April 1961 30	Racing Santander	1–1	Real Madrid	Santander
	Wilson 32'	Report	Sampedro 70' (own goal)	Stadium: El Sardinero; Referee: Ruiz Casasola

=== European Cup ===
==== First round ====
9 November 1960	Real Madrid (Spain)	2–2	(Spain) CF Barcelona	Madrid
	Mateos 1'; Gento 33'	Report	Luis Suárez 27', 88' (pen.)	Stadium: Santiago Bernabéu Stadium; Attendance: 84,358; Referee: (England) Arthur Edward Ellis

23 November 1960	CF Barcelona (Spain)	2–1	(Spain) Real Madrid	Barcelona
	Vergés 33'; Evaristo 81'	Report	Canário 87'	Stadium: Estadio del CF Barcelona; Attendance: 120,000; Referee: (England) Reginald Leafe

=== Copa del Generalísimo ===
==== Round of 32 ====
7 May 1961	Hércules CF	0–5	Real Madrid	Alicante

11 May 1961	Real Madrid	6–0	Hércules CF	Madrid
				Stadium: Chamartín

==== Round of 16 ====
21 May 1961	Racing Santander	1–1	Real Madrid	Santander

21 May 1961	Real Madrid	3–0	Racing Santander	Madrid
				Stadium: Chamartín

==== Quarter-finals ====
1 June 1961	Athletic Bilbao	0–2	Real Madrid	Bilbao

4 June 1961	Real Madrid	3–0	Athletic Bilbao	Madrid
				Stadium: Chamartín

==== Semi-finals ====
18 June 1961	Real Madrid	7–1	Real Betis	Madrid
				Stadium: Chamartín

25 June 1961	Real Betis	4–1	Real Madrid	Sevilla

==== Final ====
2 July 1961	Atlético Madrid	3–2	Real Madrid	Madrid
20:30 CET	Peiró 20', 46'; Mendonça 69'	Report (in Spanish)	Puskás 9'; Di Stéfano 82'	Stadium: Santiago Bernabéu; Attendance: 120,000; Referee: Vicente Llopis

=== Intercontinental Cup ===
3 July 1960	Peñarol (Uruguay)	0–0	(Spain) Real Madrid	Montevideo
		Report		Stadium: Estadio Centenario, Attendance: 71,872; Referee: (Argentina) José Luis Praddaude

4 September 1960	Real Madrid (Spain)	5–1	(Uruguay) Peñarol	Madrid
	Puskás 2', 8'; Di Stéfano 3'; Herrera 40'; Gento 54'	Report	Spencer 80'	Stadium: Estadio Santiago Bernabéu, Attendance: 100,000; Referee: (England) Ken Aston

== Statistics ==
=== Squad statistics ===
Competition	Points	Total						GD
Competition	Points	G	W	D	L	Gs	Ga	GD
1960–61 La Liga	52	30	24	4	2	89	25	+64
1961 Copa del Generalísimo	–	9	6	1	2	29	9	+20
1960–61 European Cup	–	2	0	1	1	3	4	−1
1960 Intercontinental Cup	–	2	1	1	0	5	1	+4
Totale		43	37	7	5	126	39	+87

=== Players statistics ===
No.	Pos	Nat	Player	Total		Primera Division		Copa del Generalisimo		European Cup		Intercontinental Cup	
No.	Pos	Nat	Player	Apps	Goals	Apps	Goals	Apps	Goals	Apps	Goals	Apps	Goals
	GK	(Spain) ESP	Vicente	40	-38	30	-25	8	-9	2	-4	0	0
	DF	(Spain) ESP	Marquitos	30	0	19	0	7	0	2	0	2	0
	DF	(Uruguay) URU	Santamaria	38	1	27	1	8	0	1	0	2	0
	DF	(Spain) ESP	Casado	37	0	26	0	9	0	2	0		
	DF	(Spain) ESP	Pachín	37	0	25	0	8	0	2	0	2	0
	MF	(Spain) ESP	Del Sol	42	18	29	17	9	1	2	0	2	0
	MF	(Spain) ESP	Vidal	36	0	28	0	4	0	2	0	2	0
	MF	(Brazil) BRA	Canário	21	6	19	5	0	0	1	1	1	0
	FW	(Argentina) ARG	Di Stefano	36	30	23	21	9	8	2	0	2	1
	FW	(Hungary) HUN	Puskas	41	44	28	28	9	14	2	0	2	2
	FW	(Spain) ESP	Gento	38	14	28	9	8	3	1	1	1	1
	GK	(Argentina) ARG	Dominguez	3	-1	0	0	1	0	0	0	2	-1
	FW	(Spain) ESP	Bueno	8	0	5	0	2	0	0	0	1	0
		(Spain) ESP	Herrera	9	0	6	0	1	0	1	0	1	0
	FW	(Spain) ESP	Mateos	10	5	2	0	7	4	1	1		
		(Spain) ESP	Miche	4	0	1	0	3	0				
	FW	(Spain) ESP	Pepillo	5	0	5	0						
	FW	(Argentina) ARG	Rial	2	0	2	0						
		(Spain) ESP	Ruiz	15	1	10	1	5	0				
	DF	(Spain) ESP	Santisteban	3	0	3	0						
	FW	(Sweden) SWE	Simonsson	3	1	3	1						
	MF	(Spain) ESP	Zarraga	5	0	3	0	0	0	0	0	2	0
	MF	(Spain) ESP	Felo	1	0	0	0	1	0				

- Source: https://www.bdfutbol.com/en/t/t1960-612.html
