= 1959–60 Real Madrid CF season =

57th season in existence of Real Madrid CF

Real Madrid CF
1959–60 season
- President: Santiago Bernabéu
- Head coach: Manuel Fleitas (until 11 April 1960); Miguel Muñoz
- Stadium: Chamartín
- Primera Division: 2nd
- Copa del Generalísimo: Runners-up
- European Cup: Winners (in European Cup)
- Top goalscorer: League: Ferenc Puskás (25); All: Puskás (47)
Home colours	Away colours

The 1959–60 season was Real Madrid Club de Fútbol's 57th season in existence and the club's 29th consecutive season in the top flight of Spanish football.

== Summary ==
During the summer French playmaker Raymond Kopa returned to Just Fontaine's Stade de Reims after three successful campaigns at Chamartín. Chairman Santiago Bernabéu, impressed by Brazil's style of play at the 1958 FIFA World Cup, made an offer to buy Pelé from Santos FC however, it was rejected by the player. Then, the club hired a new manager, former Brazilian tournament winner Manuel Fleitas Solich from Flamengo and transferred in the club's first ever black player Brazilian World Cup winner midfielder Didí (who only played 19 matches and abandoned the team in January). Also, from América-RJ, came Brazilian midfielder Canário and in April arrived from Real Betis youngstar Luis del Sol, who played a superb season.

In the Spanish league, Madrid and Barcelona finished tied in points (46). Although Real scored a record 92 goals in 30 rounds, it finished second on a goal average tie-breaker. After the squad lost the league title mathematically in round 29, Fleitas was fired. Then, former club player Miguel Muñoz took the head coach job in time for the semi-finals and final of the European Cup and the Copa del Generalísimo campaign.

In the European Cup, the team won its fifth consecutive title. In the round of sixteen, they won the series against Jeunesse Esch from Luxembourg (12–2, including four goals for Puskas, three for Enrique Mateos) and in the quarter-finals defeated French champions Nice 7–2, the second leg in front of 100,000 spectators. In the semi-finals against CF Barcelona, without star player László Kubala who was out due to a technical decision by coach Helenio Herrera, the team won both legs of the series with a 3–1 score (Alfredo Di Stéfano and Puskas were crucial to achieving victory), reaching the final for the fifth time in a row. In the title match, the squad (this time with Puskas as starter) defeated West German champions Eintracht Frankfurt by a 7–3 score in front of 120,000 spectators at Hampden Park, Glasgow.

In the Copa del Generalísimo, the team defeated Barakaldo (4–1), Cultural Leonesa (9–0) and Sporting Gijón (13–1), reaching the semi-finals against Athletic Bilbao: in Bilbao, the basque team won 3–0; nevertheless Real Madrid mounted an incredible comeback in the second leg, winning 8–1 in Madrid. In the final, at Chamartín, the team lost 3–1 to Atlético Madrid in front of 100,000 spectators.

== Squad ==
Note: Flags indicate national team as defined under FIFA eligibility rules; some limited exceptions apply. Players may hold more than one non-FIFA nationality.

No.	Pos.	Nation	Player
—	GK	ARG	Domínguez
—	GK	ESP	Juan Alonso
—	GK	ESP	Bagur
—	DF	URU	Santamaría
—	DF	ESP	Marquítos
—	DF	ESP	Miche
—	DF	ESP	Lesmes II
—	DF	ESP	Mateos
—	DF	ESP	Pantaleón
—	DF	ESP	Pachín
—	MF	ESP	Vidal
—	MF	ESP	Felo

No.	Pos.	Nation	Player
—	MF	ESP	Antonio Ruiz
—	MF	BRA	Didi
—	MF	ESP	Zárraga
—	MF	ESP	Santisteban
—	MF	ESP	Luis del Sol
—	FW	ESP	Gento
—	FW	ESP	Herrera
—	FW	HUN	Puskás
—	FW	ARG	Di Stéfano
—	FW	ESP	Pepillo
—	FW	ARG	Héctor Rial
—	FW	BRA	Canario
—	FW	ESP	Bueno

=== Transfers ===
In
Pos.	Name	From	Type
MF	Didi	Botafogo	-
MF	Vidal	Granada	-
GK	Juan Bagur	Real Sociedad	
FW	Pepillo	Sevilla	
FW	Canario	-	-
FW	Bueno	Cadiz	-
DF	Pantaleon	Las Palmas	-
DF	Pachin	Osasuna	-
MF	Luis Del Sol	Real Betis	-
MF	Felo	Las Palmas	-
DF	Pedro Casado	Plus Ultra	-
FW	Laszlo Kaszas	-	-

Out
Pos.	Name	To	Type
MF	Raymond Kopa	Stade de Reims	-
FW	Joseito	Levante	-
MF	Hector Ramos	Plus Ultra	-
MF	Segurola	Sevilla	-
MF	Villa	Plus Ultra	-
FW	Joaquin Garcia		-
FW	Ramón Marsal	Levante	-
DF	Pedro Casado	Plus Ultra	-

== Competitions ==
=== Overall ===
Competition	Final position
Primera División	2nd
Copa del Generalísimo	Runner-up
European Cup	Winners

=== La Liga ===
==== League table ====
Pos	Team	Pld	W	D	L	GF	GA	GD	Pts	Qualification or relegation
1	Barcelona (C)	30	22	2	6	86	28	+58	46	Qualified for the European Cup and the Inter-Cities Fairs Cup
2	Real Madrid (Note: Real Madrid qualified as title holders.)	30	21	4	5	92	36	+56	46	Qualified for the European Cup
3	Atlético Bilbao	30	19	1	10	74	45	+29	39	
4	Sevilla	30	16	4	10	63	44	+19	36	
5	Atlético Madrid	30	15	3	12	59	40	+19	33	

Source: BDFútbol
Rules for classification: 1) Points; 2) Head-to-head results; 3) Goal difference; 4) Number of goals scored
(C) Champions

==== Position by round ====
Round	1	2	3	4	5	6	7	8	9	10	11	12	13	14	15	16	17	18	19	20	21	22	23	24	25	26	27	28	29	30
Ground	H	A	H	A	H	A	H	A	H	A	H	A	H	A	H	A	H	A	H	A	H	A	H	A	H	A	H	A	H	A
Result	W	L	W	D	W	W	W	D	W	D	W	L	W	W	W	L	W	D	W	W	W	W	W	L	W	L	W	W	W	W
Position	1	3	1	2	2	1	1	2	1	2	1	2	1	1	1	1	1	1	1	1	1	1	1	1	1	1	2	2	1	2

Source: www.lfp.es
A = Away; H = Home; W = Win; D = Draw; L = Loss; = Leader, 1960–61 European Cup

==== Matches ====
Kickoff times are in CET. Win Draw Loss

13 September 1959 1	Real Madrid	7–1	Real Betis	Madrid
	Ríos 25' (own goal); Puskás 56'; Puskás 65'; Pepillo 71'; Gento 80'; Ríos 85' (own goal); Gento 89'	Report	Rojas 20'	Stadium: Chamartín

20 September 1959 2	Valencia CF	2–1	Real Madrid	Valencia
	Héctor Núñez 22'; Roberto Gil 57'	Report	Gento 68'	Stadium: Mestalla; Referee: Blanco Perez

27 September 1959 3	Real Madrid	4–0	Español	Madrid
	Puskás 4'; Di Stéfano 25'; Santisteban 37'; Didí 39'	Report		Stadium: Chamartín

4 October 1959 4	Real Zaragoza	2–2	Real Madrid	Zaragoza
	Wilson 2'; Marcelino 20'	Report	Di Stéfano 32'; Puskás 85'	Stadium: La Romareda

11 October 1959 5	Real Madrid	3–1	Athletic Bilbao	Madrid
	Herrera 40'; Puskás 49'; Gento 73'	Report	Marcaida 28'	Stadium: Chamartín; Referee: Ruiz Casasola

18 October 1959 6	Elche CF	1–5	Real Madrid	Elche
	Fuertes 87'	Report	Herrera 39'; Di Stéfano 44'; Puskás 45'; Gento 57'; Gento 73'	Stadium: Campo de Altabix; Referee: Birigay Nieva

25 October 1959 7	Real Madrid	7–0	Osasuna	Madrid
	Puskás 25'; Gento 44'; Di Stéfano 47'; Vidal 49'; Didi 52'; Puskás 75'; Di Stéfano 83'	Report		Stadium: Chamartín; Referee: Gomez Contreras

1 November 1959 8	Atlético Madrid	3–3	Real Madrid	Madrid
	Collar 13'; Álvaro 16'; Ramiro 85'	Report	Di Stéfano 4'; Puskás 32'; Gento 54'	Stadium: Metropolitano; Referee: Rey Martinez

8 November 1959 9	Real Madrid	1–0	Sevilla CF	Madrid
	Didi 42'	Report		Stadium: Chamartín; Referee: Blanco Perez

15 November 1959 10	Real Oviedo	1–1	Real Madrid	Oviedo
	Lalo 50'	Report	Mateos 46' (pen.)	Stadium: Carlos Tartiere; Referee: Gonzalez Echeverria

29 November 1959 11	Real Madrid	2–0	CF Barcelona	Madrid
	Mateos 5'; Di Stéfano 82'	Report		Stadium: Chamartín; Referee: Gardeazabal Garay

6 December 1959 12	Real Valladolid	3–1	Real Madrid	Valladolid
	Morollón 15'; Mirlo 43'; Endériz 56'	Report	Gento 54'	Stadium: José Zorrilla; Referee: Ortiz de Mendibil

13 December 1959 13	Real Madrid	6–0	Granada CF	Madrid
	Herrera 6'; Gento 31'; Vidal 48'; Herrera 69'; Gento 81'; Mateos 85'	Report		Stadium: Chamartín; Referee: Azon Roma

20 December 1959 14	Real Sociedad	1–3	Real Madrid	San Sebastián
	Gallastegui 59'	Report	Herrera 44'; Didi 53'; Gento 54'	Stadium: Atotxa; Referee: Birigay Nieva

27 December 1959 15	Real Madrid	2–0	UD Las Palmas	Madrid
	Gento 1'; Didi 42'	Report		Stadium: Chamartín; Referee: Gonzalez Echeverria

3 January 1960 16	Real Betis	1–0	Real Madrid	Sevilla
	Isidro 78'	Report		Stadium: Heliópolis; Referee: Garcia Fernandez

10 January 1960 17	Real Madrid	2–1	Valencia CF	Madrid
	Didi 40'; Mateos 44'	Report	Aveiro 36'	Stadium: Chamartín; Referee: Gomez Contreras

17 January 1960 18	Español	1–1	Real Madrid	Barcelona
	Sastre 2'	Report	Puskás 14'	Stadium: Sarrià; Referee: Lacambra Canela

24 January 1960 19	Real Madrid	2–1	Real Zaragoza	Madrid
	Pepillo 6'; Puskás 44'	Report	Csabai 43'	Stadium: Chamartín; Referee: Birigay Nieva

31 January 1960 20	Atletico de Bilbao	1–3	Real Madrid	Bilbao
	Uribe 18'	Report	Pepillo 32'; Puskás 67'; Puskás 80'	Stadium: San Mamés; Referee: Gonzalez Echeverria

7 February 1960 21	Real Madrid	11–2	Elche CF	Madrid
	Puskás 13'; Puskás 17'; Pepillo 22'; Pepillo 27'; Puskás 31'; Pepillo 48'; Pepillo 51'; Gento 57'; Santisteban 59'; Pepillo 62'; Puskás 82'	Report	Santisteban 40' (own goal); César 70'	Stadium: Chamartín; Referee: Garcia Fernandez

14 February 1960 22	Osasuna	1–2	Real Madrid	Pamplona
	Félix Ruiz 1'	Report	Pepillo 45'; Puskás 53'	Stadium: San Juan; Referee: Gomez Contreras

21 February 1960 23	Real Madrid	3–2	Atlético Madrid	Madrid
	Di Stéfano 2'; Puskás 27'; Puskás 71' (pen.); Juan Alonso 66'	Report	Peiró 7'; Adelardo 60'; Mendonca (penalty missed) 67'; Manuel Pazos (red card) 72'; Collar 85'	Stadium: Chamartín; Referee: Lacambra Canela

28 February 1960 24	Sevilla CF	4–1	Real Madrid	Sevilla
	Szalay 2', 58'; Pereda 11'; Antoniet 43'	Report	Puskás 18'	Stadium: Estadio Sanchez Pizjuan; Referee: Ortiz de Mendibil

6 March 1960 25	Real Madrid	8–1	Real Oviedo	Madrid
	Di Stéfano 6'; Pepillo 8'; Herrera 39'; Puskás 42' (pen.); Gento 44'; Herrera 83'; Di Stéfano 85'; Puskás 87'	Report	Sanchez Lage 69'	Stadium: Chamartín; Referee: Gardeazabal Garay

20 March 1960 26	CF Barcelona	3–1	Real Madrid	Barcelona
	Kocsis 50'; Eulogio Martínez 60'; Villaverde 62'	Report	Di Stéfano 58'	Stadium: Estadio del CF Barcelona; Referee: Gonzalez Echeverria

27 March 1960 27	Real Madrid	1–0	Real Valladolid	Madrid
	Puskás 12'	Report		Stadium: Chamartín; Referee: Gomez Contreras

3 April 1960 28	Granada CF	3–4	Real Madrid	Granada
	Carranza 18'; Martínez 26'; Arsenio Iglesias 72'	Report	Di Stéfano 2'; Puskás 9'; Puskás 73'; Méndez 87' (own goal)	Stadium: Los Cármenes; Referee: Gardeazabal Garay

10 April 1960 29	Real Madrid	4–0	Real Sociedad	Madrid
	Pepillo 11'; Pepillo 17'; Pepillo 19'; Irulegui 60' (own goal)	Report		Stadium: Chamartín; Referee: Gomez Arribas

17 April 1960 30	UD Las Palmas	0–1	Real Madrid	Las Palmas
		Report	Bueno 74'	Stadium: Estadio Insular; Referee: Blanco Perez

=== Copa del Generalísimo ===
==== Final ====
26 June 1960	Atlético Madrid	3–1	Real Madrid	Madrid
19:00 CET	Collar 51'; Jones 76'; Peiró 86'	Report (in Spanish)	Puskás 20'	Stadium: Santiago Bernabéu; Attendance: 100,000; Referee: Félix Birigay

=== European Cup ===
==== First round ====
21 October 1959	Real Madrid (Spain)	7–0	(Luxembourg) Jeunesse Esch	Santiago Bernabéu Stadium, Madrid
	Di Stéfano 25'; Puskás 34', 62', 83'; Herrera 43', 77'; Mateos 53'	Report		Attendance: 59,447; Referee: Giulio Campanati (Italy)

4 November 1959	Jeunesse Esch (Luxembourg)	2–5	(Spain) Real Madrid	Luxembourg City
	Theis 10'; Schaak 15'	Report	Vidal 13'; Mateos 18', 31'; Di Stéfano 25'; Puskás 29'	Stadium: Stade Municipal, Attendance: 20,000; Referee: Vincenzo Orlandini (Italy)

==== Quarter-finals ====
4 February 1960	Nice (France)	3–2	(Spain) Real Madrid	Nice
	Nurenberg 54', 67' (pen.), 72'	Report	Herrera 15'; Rial 30'	Stadium: Stade Municipal du Ray, Attendance: 21,422; Referee: Abel da Costa (Portugal)

2 March 1960	Real Madrid (Spain)	4–0	(France) Nice	Madrid
	Pepillo 21'; Gento 40'; Di Stéfano 45'; Puskás 51'	Report		Stadium: Santiago Bernabéu Stadium; Attendance: 100,000; Referee: Eduardo Rosa Gouveia (Portugal)

==== Semi-finals ====
15 April 1960	Real Madrid (Spain)	3–1	(Spain) CF Barcelona	Madrid
	Di Stéfano 17', 84'; Puskás 28'	Report	Martínez 37'	Stadium: Santiago Bernabéu Stadium; Attendance: 120,000; Referee: (England) Reginald Leafe

6 May 1960	CF Barcelona (Spain)	1–3	(Spain) Real Madrid	Barcelona
	Kocsis 89'	Report	Puskás 25', 75'; Gento 68'	Stadium: Estadio del CF Barcelona; Attendance: 80,000; Referee: (England) Arthur Edward Ellis

==== Final ====
18 May 1960	Eintracht Frankfurt (West Germany)	3–7	(Spain) Real Madrid	Glasgow
19:30 BST	Kreß 18'; Stein 72', 75'	Report	Di Stéfano 27'; Di Stéfano 30'; Puskas 46'; Puskas 56' (pen.); Puskas 60'; Puskas 71'; Di Stefano 73'	Stadium: Hampden Park; Attendance: 127,621; Referee: Jack Mowat (Scotland)

== Statistics ==
=== Players statistics ===
No.	Pos	Nat	Player	Total		Liga		Cup		Europe	
No.	Pos	Nat	Player	Apps	Goals	Apps	Goals	Apps	Goals	Apps	Goals
	GK	(Argentina) ARG	Domínguez	42	-51	28	-33	7	-8	7	-10
	DF	(Spain) ESP	Marquítos	37	0	27	0	4	0	6	0
	DF	(Uruguay) URU	Santamaría	43	0	30	0	7	0	6	0
	DF	(Spain) ESP	Miche	22	0	10	0	9	0	3	0
	MF	(Spain) ESP	Vidal	39	3	26	2	7	0	6	1
	MF	(Spain) ESP	Antonio Ruiz	28	0	24	0	0	0	4	0
	MF	(Spain) ESP	Zárraga	27	0	16	0	8	0	3	0
	FW	(Spain) ESP	Herrera	39	13	25	7	9	3	5	3
	FW	(Hungary) HUN	Puskás	36	47	24	25	5	10	7	12
	FW	(Argentina) ARG	Di Stéfano	34	23	23	12	5	3	6	8
	FW	(Spain) ESP	Gento	38	19	27	14	5	3	6	2
	GK	(Spain) ESP	Bagur	4	-2	2	-1	2	-1	0	0
	MF	(Brazil) BRA	Didi	19	6	19	6	0	0	0	0
	FW	(Spain) ESP	Pepillo	18	22	12	13	5	8	1	1
	DF	(Spain) ESP	Lesmes II	9	0	8	0	0	0	1	0
	FW	(Spain) ESP	Mateos	12	7	7	4	2	0	3	3
	GK	(Spain) ESP	Juan Alonso	1	-2	1	-2	0	0	0	0
	MF	(Spain) ESP	Santisteban	9	2	6	2	1	0	2	0
	FW	(Argentina) ARG	Héctor Rial	9	2	5	0	3	1	1	1
	FW	(Brazil) BRA	Canario	8	0	5	0	0	0	3	0
	FW	(Spain) ESP	Bueno	7	3	3	1	4	2	0	0
	DF	(Spain) ESP	Pantaleón	9	0	3	0	5	0	1	0
	DF	(Spain) ESP	Pachín	3	0	0	0	0	0	3	0
	MF	(Spain) ESP	Del Sol	10	4	0	0	7	4	3	0
	MF	(Spain) ESP	Felo	4	0	0	0	4	0	0	0

- Source: https://www.bdfutbol.com/en/t/t1959-602.html
