= 1958–59 Real Madrid CF season =

56th season in existence of Real Madrid CF

Real Madrid Club de Fútbol
1958–59 season
- President: Santiago Bernabéu
- Manager: Luis Carniglia (Until 21 February 1959); Miguel Muñoz (Until 13 April); Luis Carniglia
- Stadium: Estadio Santiago Bernabéu
- Primera Division: 2nd
- Copa del Generalísimo: Semi-finals
- European Cup: Winners (in European Cup)
- Top goalscorer: League: Di Stéfano (23); All: Di Stéfano (34)
Home colours	Away colours

The 1958–59 season was Real Madrid Club de Fútbol's 56th season in existence and the club's 28th consecutive season in the top flight of Spanish football.

== Summary ==
During the summer Hungarian player Ferenc Puskás arrived to the club after a two-year FIFA ban on him due to his defection from communist Hungary. The move was controversial due to the player's age (31 years old) and him allegedly being overweight, the reasons why he had been already turned down by Juventus, Milan, and Manchester United.

However, Puskas and Di Stefano completed a lethal duo with an astonishing campaign collecting the club's fourth consecutive European Cup, defeating Just Fontaine's Stade de Reims. However, Puskas missed the final match due to a technical decision by head coach Luis Carniglia, who was fired after that by club chairman Santiago Bernabéu. Additionally, Di Stefano clinched another top scorer individual trophy in the Spanish league with 23 goals. Puskas was second with 21 goals.

The squad finished in a decent second spot in the league standings, four points behind champions Barcelona, despite scoring a club record 89 goals (to Barcelona's 96). In June, Real Madrid reached the semi-finals of Copa del Generalísimo, where they were defeated by Barcelona.

== Squad ==
Note: Flags indicate national team as defined under FIFA eligibility rules; some limited exceptions apply. Players may hold more than one non-FIFA nationality.

No.	Pos.	Nation	Player
—	GK	ESP	Juan Alonso
—	GK	ARG	Rogelio Domínguez
—	GK	ESP	Javier Berasaluce
—	DF	ESP	Chus Herrera
—	DF	ESP	Rafael Lesmes
—	DF	URU	José Santamaría
—	DF	ESP	Miche
—	DF	ESP	Ángel Atienza
—	DF	ESP	Marquitos
—	MF	URU	Hector Ramos
—	MF	ESP	José María Zárraga

No.	Pos.	Nation	Player
—	MF	ESP	Juan Santisteban Troyano
—	MF	FRA	Raymond Kopa
—	MF	ESP	Antonio Ruiz
—	FW	ESP	Ramón Marsal
—	FW	ARG	Héctor Rial
—	FW	ARG	Alfredo Di Stéfano
—	FW	ESP	Joseíto
—	FW	ESP	Francisco Gento
—	FW	HUN	Ferenc Puskás
—	FW	ESP	Enrique Mateos

=== Transfers ===
In
Pos.	Name	From	Type
FW	Ferenc Puskas	-	-
FW	Jesus Herrera	Oviedo	-
DF	Miche	Atletico Ceuta	-
DF	Ramos URU	-	-
MF	Falin	Real Oviedo	-
MF	Segurola	Real Sociedad	-
MF	Villa		-
FW	Joaquin Garcia		-

Out
Pos.	Name	To	Type
MF	Miguel Muñoz	-	-
MF	Rubio	Zaragoza	-
FW	Brunet	Cordoba	-
MF	Pereda	Valladolid	-
FW	Becerril	Granada	-
FW	Heliodoro Castaño	Real Betis	-
FW	Carlos Cela	-	-

== Competitions ==
=== La Liga ===
==== League table ====
Pos	Team	Pld	W	D	L	GF	GA	GD	Pts	Qualification or relegation
1	Barcelona (C)	30	24	3	3	96	26	+70	51	Qualification for the European Cup preliminary round
2	Real Madrid	30	21	5	4	89	29	+60	47	Qualification for the European Cup round of 16 (Note: Real Madrid qualified directly to the round of 16 as title holders.)
3	Atlético Bilbao	30	17	2	11	72	33	+39	36	
4	Valencia	30	13	7	10	47	41	+6	33	
5	Atlético Madrid	30	13	6	11	58	48	+10	32	

Source: BDFútbol
Rules for classification: 1) Points; 2) Head-to-head results; 3) Goal difference; 4) Number of goals scored
(C) Champions

==== Position by round ====
Round	1	2	3	4	5	6	7	8	9	10	11	12	13	14	15	16	17	18	19	20	21	22	23	24	25	26	27	28	29	30
Ground	A	H	A	H	A	H	A	H	A	H	A	H	A	H	A	H	A	H	A	H	A	H	A	H	A	H	A	H	A	H
Result	W	W	W	W	W	W	L	W	W	W	D	W	W	D	L	W	D	W	W	W	W	W	L	W	D	W	W	W	L	D
Position	4	1	1	1	1	1	2	1	1	1	1	1	1	1	2	1	2	2	2	2	2	1	2	2	2	2	2	2	2	2

Source: www.lfp.es
A = Away; H = Home; W = Win; D = Draw; L = Loss; = Leader, 1959–60 European Cup

==== Matches ====
14 September 1958 1	UD Las Palmas	1–2	Real Madrid	Las Palmas
	Padrón 2'	Report	Rial 46'; Rial 48'	Stadium: Estadio Insular; Referee: Birigay Nieva

21 September 1958 2	Real Madrid	5–1	Real Gijón	Madrid
	Puskás 38' (pen.); Puskás 62' (pen.); Herrera 74'; Puskás 77'; Di Stéfano 84'	Report	Iborra 67'	Stadium: Estadio Santiago Bernabéu; Referee: Castiñeiras

28 September 1958 3	Celta de Vigo	2–4	Real Madrid	Vigo
	Escobar 16'; Escobar 89'	Report	Di Stéfano 4'; Di Stéfano 49' (pen.); Di Stéfano 57'; Zárraga 72'	Referee: Gonzalez Echeverria

5 October 1958 4	Real Madrid	8–0	Osasuna	Madrid
	Di Stéfano 20'; Di Stéfano 33'; Rial 34'; Puskás 45'; Gento 67'; Gento 74'; Di Stéfano 79'; Rial 89'	Report		Stadium: Estadio Santiago Bernabéu; Referee: Garcia Fernandez

12 October 1958 5	Real Betis	2–3	Real Madrid	Seville
	Castaño 20'; Moreira 66'	Report	Gento 28'; Isidro 46' (own goal); Di Stéfano 88'	Stadium: Heliópolis; Referee: Ortiz de Mendibil

19 October 1958 6	Real Madrid	3–0	Real Zaragoza	Madrid
	Di Stéfano 34'; Puskás 80'; Puskás 86'	Report		Stadium: Estadio Santiago Bernabéu; Referee: Martorell Mir

26 October 1958 7	CF Barcelona	4–0	Real Madrid	Barcelona
	Evaristo 22', 68', 70'; Czibor (red card) 74'; Justo Tejada 84'	Report	Santamaría (red card) 74'	Stadium: Estadio del CF Barcelona; Referee: Birigay Nieva

2 November 1958 8	Real Madrid	5–0	Atlético Madrid	Madrid
	Joseíto 6'; Kopa 8'; Gento 61'; Puskás 76'; Kopa 78'	Report		Stadium: Estadio Santiago Bernabéu; Referee: Gardeazabal Garay

9 November 1958 9	Real Oviedo	0–2	Real Madrid	Oviedo
		Report	Kopa 16'; Kopa 82'	Stadium: Carlos Tartiere; Referee: Blanco Pérez

16 November 1958 10	Real Madrid	3–0	Valencia CF	Madrid
	Puskás 32' (pen.); Herrera 42'; Herrera 62'	Report		Stadium: Estadio Santiago Bernabéu; Referee: Ortiz de Mendibil

23 November 1958 11	Real Sociedad	0–0	Real Madrid	San Sebastián
		Report		Stadium: Atocha; Referee: Garcia Fernandez

30 November 1958 12	Real Madrid	2–0	Granada CF	Madrid
	Kopa 17'; Ruiz 80'	Report		Stadium: Estadio Santiago Bernabéu; Referee: Gomez Arribas

7 December 1958 13	Sevilla CF	1–3	Real Madrid	Seville
	Ruiz Sosa 27'	Report	Di Stéfano 46'; Gento 64'; Di Stéfano 85' (pen.)	Stadium: Estadio Sanchez Pizjuan; Referee: Gardeazabal Garay

14 December 1958 14	Real Madrid	0–0	Atletico de Bilbao	Madrid
		Report		Stadium: Estadio Santiago Bernabéu

28 December 1958 15	Español	2–0	Real Madrid	Barcelona
	Aguirre 13'; Coll 19'	Report		Stadium: Sarrià; Referee: Ortiz de Mendibil

4 January 1959 16	Real Madrid	10–1	UD Las Palmas	Madrid
	Herrera 21'; Di Stéfano 38'; Joseíto 40'; Di Stéfano 46'; Kopa 48'; Puskás 52'; Di Stéfano 59'; Puskás 68'; Joseíto 70'; Puskás 73'	Report	Larraz 50'	Stadium: Estadio Santiago Bernabéu; Referee: Blanco Perez

11 January 1959 17	Real Gijón	0–0	Real Madrid	Gijón
		Report		Stadium: El Molinón

18 January 1959 18	Real Madrid	3–0	Celta de Vigo	Madrid
	Mateos 22'; Kopa 26'; Di Stéfano 54'; Lesmes 83'	Report		Stadium: Estadio Santiago Bernabéu; Referee: Garcia Fernandez

25 January 1959 19	Osasuna	1–2	Real Madrid	Pamplona
	Areta 74'	Report	Di Stéfano 2'; Herrera 44'	Stadium: San Juan; Referee: Gomez Contreras

1 February 1959 20	Real Madrid	4–2	Real Betis	Madrid
	Rial 4'; Herrera 31'; Di Stéfano 37'; Herrera 74'	Report	Del Sol 26'; Castaño 70'	Stadium: Estadio Santiago Bernabéu; Referee: Ortiz de Mendibil

8 February 1959 21	Real Zaragoza	1–2	Real Madrid	Zaragoza
	Murillo 89'	Report	Gento 22'; Puskás 79'	Stadium: La Romareda; Referee: Blanco Perez

15 February 1959 22	Real Madrid	1–0	CF Barcelona	Madrid
	Jesús Herrera Alonso 79'	Report		Stadium: Estadio Santiago Bernabéu; Referee: García Fernandez

22 February 1959 23	Atlético Madrid	2–1	Real Madrid	Madrid
	Peiró 19'; Vavá 72'	Report	Di Stéfano 75'	Stadium: Metropolitano; Referee: Gardeazabal Garay

8 March 1959 24	Real Madrid	4–0	Real Oviedo	Madrid
	Puskás 31'; Puskás 34'; Puskás 53'; Rial 68'	Report		Stadium: Estadio Santiago Bernabéu; Referee: Martorell Mir

15 March 1959 25	Valencia CF	1–1	Real Madrid	Valencia
	Joel 82'	Report	Ruiz 35'	Stadium: Mestalla; Referee: Ortiz de Mendibil

22 March 1959 26	Real Madrid	6–1	Real Sociedad	Madrid
	Di Stéfano 24'; Rial 30'; Mateos 33'; Puskás 49'; Di Stéfano 69'; Kopa 72'	Report	Sarasqueta 89'	Stadium: Estadio Santiago Bernabéu; Referee: Castiñeiras

29 March 1959 27	Granada CF	0–3	Real Madrid	Granada
		Report	Puskás 31'; Puskás 46'; Puskás 86'	Stadium: Los Cármenes; Referee: Gardeazabal Garay

5 April 1959 28	Real Madrid	8–0	Sevilla CF	Madrid
	Di Stéfano 5'; Di Stéfano 36'; Rial 46'; Puskás 58'; Kopa 77'; Puskás 86'; Gento 88'; Di Stéfano 89'	Report		Stadium: Estadio Santiago Bernabéu; Referee: Gonzalez Echeverria

12 April 1959 29	Atletico de Bilbao	4–1	Real Madrid	Bilbao
	Maguregui 4', 51', 70'; Artetxe 68'	Report	Mateos 38'	Stadium: San Mamés; Referee: Castiñeiras

19 April 1959 30	Real Madrid	3–3	Español	Madrid
	Kopa 50'; Rial 68'; Santamaría 89'	Report	Szolnok 14'; Coll 38'; Sastre 84' (pen.)	Stadium: Estadio Santiago Bernabéu; Referee: Ortiz de Mendibil

=== Copa del Generalísimo ===
==== Round of 32 ====
26 April 1959	CF Extremadura	0–5	Real Madrid	Almendralejo
				Stadium: Estadio Francisco de la Hera

3 May 1959	Real Madrid	3–0	CF Extremadura	Madrid
				Stadium: Estadio Santiago Bernabéu

==== Round of 16 ====
10 May 1959	Real Madrid	4–1	Athletic Bilbao	Madrid
				Stadium: Estadio Santiago Bernabéu

17 May 1959	Athletic Bilbao	0–1	Real Madrid	Bilbao
				Stadium: San Mamés

==== Quarter-finals ====
24 May 1959	Real Madrid	3–1	Sevilla CF	Madrid
				Stadium: Estadio Santiago Bernabéu

28 May 1959	Sevilla CF	1–0	Real Madrid	Seville

==== Semi-finals ====
7 June 1959	Real Madrid	2–4	CF Barcelona	Madrid
				Stadium: Estadio Santiago Bernabéu

14 June 1959	CF Barcelona	3–1	Real Madrid	Barcelona
				Stadium: Estadio del CF Barcelona

=== European Cup ===
==== First round ====
13 November 1958	Real Madrid (Spain)	2–0	(Turkey) Beşiktaş	Madrid
	Santisteban 57'; Kopa 90'	Report		Stadium: Estadio Santiago Bernabéu; Attendance: 60,000; Referee: (Italy) Pietro Bonetto

27 November 1958	Beşiktaş (Turkey)	1–1	(Spain) Real Madrid	Istanbul
	Kaya 64'	Report	Santisteban 13'	Stadium: Mithat Paşa Stadium; Attendance: 30,000; Referee: (Italy) Cesare Jonni

==== Quarter-finals ====
4 March 1959	Wiener Sport-Club (Austria)	0–0	(Spain) Real Madrid	Wien
		Report		Stadium: Praterstadion; Attendance: 80,000; Referee: (Belgium) Albert Alsteen

18 March 1959	Real Madrid (Spain)	7–1	(Austria) Wiener Sport-Club	Madrid
	Mateos 8'; Di Stéfano 14', 64', 69', 75'; Rial 67'; Gento 89'	Report	Horak 9'	Stadium: Estadio Santiago Bernabéu; Attendance: 90,000; Referee: (France) Maurice Guigue

==== Semi-finals ====
15 April 1959	Real Madrid (Spain)	2–1	(Spain) Atlético Madrid	Madrid
	Rial 15'; Puskás 33' (pen.)	Report	Chuzo 13'	Stadium: Estadio Santiago Bernabéu; Attendance: 120,000; Referee: (Scotland) Jack Mowat

7 May 1959	Atlético Madrid (Spain)	1–0	(Spain) Real Madrid	Madrid
	Collar 43'	Report		Stadium: Metropolitano; Attendance: 50,000; Referee: (England) Reg Leafe

13 May 1959 (Note: A playoff match was held at a neutral ground after an aggregate tie. The away goals rule did not exist at the time.)	Real Madrid (Spain)	2–1	(Spain) Atlético Madrid	Zaragoza
	Di Stéfano 16'; Puskás 42'	Report	Collar 18'	Stadium: La Romareda; Attendance: 20,000; Referee: Arthur Edward Ellis (England)

==== Final ====
3 June 1959	Real Madrid (Spain)	2–0	(France) Stade de Reims	Stuttgart
18:00 CEST	Mateos 1'; Di Stéfano 47'	Report		Stadium: Neckarstadion; Attendance: 72,000; Referee: (Germany) Albert Dusch

== Statistics ==
=== Squad statistics ===
competition	points	total						GD
competition	points	G	V	N	P	Gf	Gs	GD
1958–59 La Liga	47	30	21	5	4	89	29	+60
1958–59 Copa del Generalísimo	–	8	4	0	3	14	6	+8
1958–59 European Cup	–	6	4	2	1	14	6	+8
Total		44	29	6	10	113	55	+58

=== Players statistics ===
No.	Pos	Nat	Player	Total		Primera Division		Copa del Generalisimo		European Cup	
No.	Pos	Nat	Player	Apps	Goals	Apps	Goals	Apps	Goals	Apps	Goals
	GK	(Spain) ESP	Alonso	29	-24	25	-22	0	0	4	-2
	DF	(Spain) ESP	Marquitos	34	0	21	0	8	0	5	0
	DF	(Uruguay) URU	Santamaria	40	1	24	1	8	0	8	0
	DF	(Spain) ESP	Lesmes	32	0	24	0	1	0	7	0
	MF	(Spain) ESP	Santisteban	39	2	29	0	3	0	7	2
	MF	(Spain) ESP	Zárraga	34	1	22	1	6	0	6	0
	FW	(France) FRA	Kopa	37	11	30	10	0	0	7	1
	FW	(Argentina) ARG	Di Stefano	43	34	28	23	8	5	7	6
	FW	(Hungary) HUN	Puskas	34	25	24	21	5	2	5	2
	FW	(Argentina) ARG	Rial	31	13	20	9	5	2	6	2
	FW	(Spain) ESP	Gento	33	10	21	7	4	2	8	1
	GK	(Argentina) ARG	Dominguez	17	-20	5	-7	8	-10	4	-3
	DF	(Spain) ESP	Miche	22	0	14	0	5	0	3	0
	FW	(Spain) ESP	Marsal	2	0	2	0	0	0	0	0
	MF	(Uruguay) URU	Ramos	5	0	2	0	3	0	0	0
	FW	(Spain) ESP	Herrera	25	9	19	8	6	1	0	0
	FW	(Spain) ESP	Joseíto	10	6	3	3	6	3	1	0
	DF	(Spain) ESP	Atienza	3	0	3	0	0	0	0	0
	MF	(Spain) ESP	Ruiz	22	2	11	2	6	0	5	0
	GK	(Spain) ESP	Berasaluce	0	0	0	0	0	0	0	0
	MF	(Spain) ESP	Villa	2	1	0	0	2	1	0	0
	FW	(Spain) ESP	Garcia	1	0	0	0	1	0	0	0
	FW	(Spain) ESP	Mateos	11	7	3	3	3	2	5	2

- Source: http://www.bdfutbol.com/en/t/t1958-592.html
