= 1960 European Cup final =

- Match programme cover
- Event: 1959–60 European Cup
Eintracht Frankfurt	Real Madrid
(West Germany)	(Spain)
3	7
- Date: 18 May 1960
- Venue: Hampden Park, Glasgow
- Referee: Jack Mowat (Scotland)
- Attendance: 127,621

The 1960 European Cup final was a football match played at Hampden Park in Glasgow, Scotland on 18 May 1960 as the conclusion to the 1959–60 European Cup. It was the fifth European Cup final in all and the first to take place in the United Kingdom.

The match was contested by four-time defending champions Real Madrid of Spain, the only previous team to win the competition, and Eintracht Frankfurt of West Germany.

Widely regarded as one of the greatest football matches ever played, Real Madrid won 7–3 in front of a record crowd of over 127,000 people. Real Madrid players Alfredo Di Stéfano (3) and Ferenc Puskás (4) both scored hat-tricks in the final.

Until the 2025 UEFA Champions League final, in which Paris Saint-Germain defeated Inter Milan 5–0, the match held the record for the largest margin of victory in a European Cup final. This match still has the record of the most goals scored in a European Cup final.

== Background ==
Eintracht Frankfurt had not played in European competitions before 1959 but a Frankfurt XI, made up of players from the city, competed in the inaugural Inter-Cities Fairs Cup in 1955–58.

Real Madrid had won the first four editions of the European Cup in 1956, 1957, 1958 and 1959.

The match was initially in doubt as the German Football Association (DFB) had banned their clubs from taking part in matches with any team containing Ferenc Puskás. Following defeat to West Germany in the 1954 FIFA World Cup final, Puskas – who had scored in the match for the defeated Hungary side – alleged that the West German players had used drugs. As a result, Puskás had to make a formal written apology to the DFB before the match could take place.

== Route to the final ==
(West Germany) Eintracht Frankfurt				Round	(Spain) Real Madrid			
Opponent	Agg.	1st leg	2nd leg		Opponent	Agg.	1st leg	2nd leg
(Switzerland) Young Boys	5–2	4–1 (A)	1–1 (H)	First round	(Luxembourg) Jeunesse Esch	12–2	7–0 (H)	5–2 (A)
(Austria) Wiener Sport-Club	3–2	2–1 (H)	1–1 (A)	Quarter-finals	(France) Nice	6–3	2–3 (A)	4–0 (H)
(Scotland) Rangers	12–4	6–1 (H)	6–3 (A)	Semi-finals	(Spain) Barcelona	6–2	3–1 (H)	3–1 (A)

=== Eintracht Frankfurt ===
Eintracht Frankfurt qualified for the competition after winning the German football championship for the only time in 1959.

In the preliminary round, Eintracht Frankfurt were due to play Kuopion Palloseura (KuPS) of Finland but were given a walkover after KuPS withdrew.

Young Boys of Switzerland were Eintracht Frankfurt's opponents in the first round. After winning the first leg 4–1 away from home, Eintracht Frankfurt drew the second leg at home 1–1 to advance 5–2 on aggregate.

Eintracht Frankfurt then faced Wiener Sport-Club of Austria in the quarter-finals. After winning the first leg 2–1 at home, Eintracht Frankfurt drew the second leg away from home 1–1 to advance 3–2 on aggregate.

In the semi-finals, Eintracht Frankfurt defeated Rangers of Scotland 6–1 in the first leg at home and 6–3 in the second leg away from home to advance to the final 12–4 on aggregate.

=== Real Madrid ===
Real Madrid qualified for the competition as defending champions and they were given a bye in the preliminary round.

In the first round, Real Madrid defeated Jeunesse Esch of Luxembourg 7–0 at home in the first leg and 5–2 away in the second leg to advance 12–2 on aggregate.

Real Madrid then faced Nice of France in the quarter-finals. After losing the first leg 3–2 away from home, Real Madrid won the second leg at home 4–0 to advance to the semi-finals 6–3 on aggregate.

In the semi-finals, Real Madrid faced rivals Barcelona. After winning the first leg 3–1 at home, Real Madrid won the second leg away from home by the same scoreline to advance to the final 6–2 on aggregate.

== Match ==
=== Details ===
18 May 1960
19:30 BST

Eintracht Frankfurt (West Germany)	3–7	(Spain) Real Madrid
Kress 18'; Stein 72', 75'	Report	Di Stéfano 27', 30', 73'; Puskás 45+1', 56' (pen.), 60', 71'

Hampden Park, Glasgow
Attendance: 127,621
Referee: Jack Mowat (Scotland)

Eintracht Frankfurt	Real Madrid

GK	1	(West Germany) Egon Loy
RB	2	(West Germany) Friedel Lutz
LB	3	(West Germany) Hermann Höfer
RH	4	(West Germany) Hans Weilbächer (c)
CB	5	(West Germany) Hans-Walter Eigenbrodt
LH	6	(West Germany) Dieter Stinka
OR	7	(West Germany) Richard Kress
IR	8	(West Germany) Dieter Lindner
CF	9	(West Germany) Erwin Stein
IL	10	(West Germany) Alfred Pfaff
OL	11	(West Germany) Erich Meier
Manager:
(West Germany) Paul Oßwald

GK	1	(Argentina) Rogelio Domínguez
RB	2	(Spain) Marquitos
LB	3	(Spain) Pachín
RH	4	(Spain) José María Vidal
CB	5	(Spain) José Santamaría (Note: Although Santamaría had amassed 20 caps for his native Uruguay from 1952 to 1957, he had been representing Spain in international play since 1958.)
LH	6	(Spain) José María Zárraga (c)
OR	7	(Brazil) Canário
IR	8	(Spain) Luis del Sol
CF	9	(Spain) Alfredo Di Stéfano (Note: Di Stéfano, a native Argentine, had represented both Argentina and Colombia earlier in his international career; however, he became a naturalised citizen of Spain in 1956, and began playing for the Spain national team in 1957.)
IL	10	(Hungary) Ferenc Puskás
OL	11	(Spain) Paco Gento
Manager:
(Spain) Miguel Muñoz

== Aftermath ==
The match set a record attendance for a European Cup final at over 127,000 while an estimated 70 million people across Europe watched the match on television. It also set a record for the most goals in a European Cup final at 10. As a result, the match is often quoted as one of the greatest football matches ever played.

Real Madrid's four-goal winning margin set a record for the largest margin of victory in a European Cup final. This would not be bettered until decades after the competition was rebranded as the UEFA Champions League. In 1994, AC Milan equalled the record by beating FC Barcelona 4–0. In 2025, Paris Saint-Germain defeated Inter Milan 5–0 to break the record.

== See also ==
- 1959–60 Eintracht Frankfurt season
- 1959–60 Real Madrid CF season
- 1960 Inter-Cities Fairs Cup final
- 1960 Intercontinental Cup
- Eintracht Frankfurt in European football
- Real Madrid CF in international football
