= 1960 Copa del Generalísimo final =

Copa del Generalísimo 1960 final
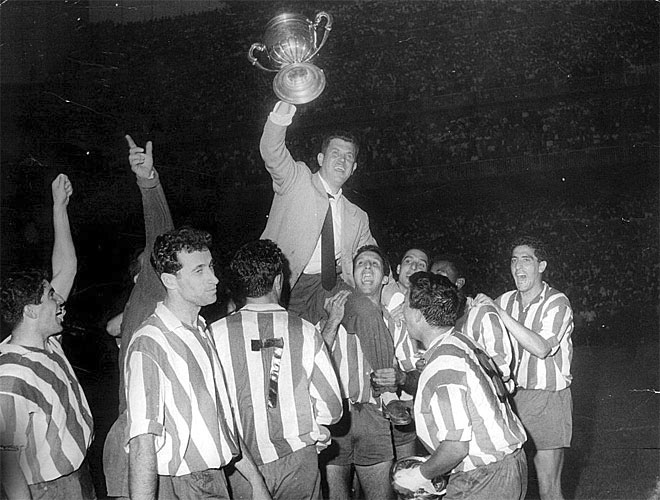
- Players of Atlético Madrid celebrating
- Event: 1959-60 Copa del Generalísimo
Atlético Madrid	Real Madrid
3	1
- Date: 26 June 1960
- Venue: Santiago Bernabéu, Madrid
- Referee: Félix Birigay
- Attendance: 100,000

The Copa del Generalísimo 1960 final was the 58th final of the King's Cup. The final was played at Santiago Bernabéu Stadium in Madrid, on 26 June 1960, being won by Club Atlético de Madrid, who beat Real Madrid 3–1.

== Match details ==
26 June 1960
19:00 CET

Atlético Madrid	3–1	Real Madrid
Collar 51'; Jones 76'; Peiró 86'	Report	Puskás 20'

Santiago Bernabéu, Madrid
Attendance: 100,000
Referee: Félix Birigay

Atlético Madrid

Real Madrid

GK	1	(Argentina) Edgardo Madinabeytia
DF	2	(Spain) Feliciano Rivilla
DF	3	(Spain) Alberto Callejo
DF	4	(Spain) Alvarito
MF	5	(Brazil) Ramiro
MF	6	(Spain) Chuzo
FW	7	(Spain) Polo
FW	8	(Spain) Adelardo Rodríguez
FW	9	(Spain) Miguel Jones
FW	10	(Spain) Joaquín Peiró
FW	11	(Spain) Enrique Collar (c)
Manager:
(Spain) José Villalonga

GK	1	(Argentina) Rogelio Domínguez
DF	2	(Spain) Pantaleón
DF	3	(Uruguay) José Santamaría
DF	4	(Spain) Miche
MF	5	(Spain) José María Vidal
MF	6	(Spain) José María Zárraga (c)
FW	7	(Spain) Chus Herrera
FW	8	(Spain) Luis del Sol
FW	9	(Argentina) Alfredo Di Stéfano
FW	10	(Hungary) Ferenc Puskás
FW	11	(Spain) Francisco Gento
Manager:
(Spain) Miguel Muñoz

== See also ==
- Madrid derby
