= Francisco Majewski =

Uruguayan footballer (1939-2012)

Personal information
- Date of birth: 1 May 1939
- Place of birth: Montevideo, Uruguay
- Date of death: 22 April 2012 (aged 72)
- Place of death: Cuernavaca, Mexico
- Height: 1.84 m (6 ft 1/2 in)
- Position: Defender

Senior career*
Years	Team	Apps	(Gls)
1954–1961	Peñarol		
1961–1963	Atlante		
1963–1970	Necaxa		
- * Club domestic league appearances and goals

Francisco Majewski (1 May 1939 – 22 April 2012) was a professional footballer who played in the Uruguayan Primera División and Mexican Primera División.

== Career ==
Born in Montevideo, Majewski played as a central defender and was an imposing figure at 1.84 meters and 87 kilos. He began playing for the youth side of Peñarol. At age 15, he joined Peñarol's senior side, where he would deputy for William Martínez. He won three Uruguayan league titles and the 1960 Copa Libertadores and played in the 1960 Intercontinental Cup before leaving the club.

In 1961, Majewski moved to Mexico to join Atlante F.C. under manager Jorge Marik. After two seasons, he transferred to Necaxa where he would partner Carlos Albert in central defense for seven years. He won the 1965–66 Copa México with Necaxa, and was known as "Caballero del área" ("Gentleman of the area") for his disciplinary record as he only received two red cards during his entire career.

== Personal ==
Majewski's brother, Alejandro Majewski, was also a professional footballer.

After he retired from playing football, Majewski resided in Mexico and sought Mexican citizenship. In April 2012, Majewski died in Cuernavaca.
