= Antonio Ruiz (footballer) =

Football player/manager

Personal information
- Full name: Antonio Ruiz Cervilla
- Date of birth: 31 July 1937 (age 89)
- Place of birth: Guadalupe, Spain
- Height: 1.75 m (5 ft 9 in)
- Position: Midfielder

Senior career*
Years	Team	Apps	(Gls)
1956–1963	Real Madrid	60	(3)
1962–1963	→ Deportivo La Coruña (loan)	23	(1)
1963–1964	Málaga	26	(2)
1964–1968	Murcia	54	(2)
1968–1970	Castellón	57	(1)
Total		220	(9)

International career
1960	Spain U21	1	(0)

Managerial career
- 1970–1971: Murcia B
- 1972–1974: Castilla
- 1979–1980: Las Palmas
- 1981–1982: Granada
- 1983–1984: Rayo Vallecano
- 1984: Elche
- 1986: Oviedo
- 1988–1991: Eldense
- 1995: Logroñés
- 1997–1998: Guadalajara
- * Club domestic league appearances and goals

Antonio Ruiz Cervilla (born 31 July 1937) is a Spanish retired football midfielder and manager.

== Playing career ==
Born in Guadalupe de Maciascoque, Region of Murcia, Ruiz played five years for Real Madrid, making his La Liga debut on 21 April 1957 in a 4–1 home win against Celta de Vigo. He appeared in only 15 games in his first three seasons combined, adding five complete matches in the club's 1958–59 campaign in the European Cup, including the 2–0 final win against Stade de Reims.

In 1962, Ruiz signed for Deportivo de La Coruña on loan, being an undisputed starter during his only season but suffering relegation. Released by the Merengues, he spent five of the following seven seasons in Segunda División, one of the two exceptions being 1964–65 with Real Murcia – top level relegation. He retired in 1970 at the age of 33, with Spanish first division totals of 103 games and five goals.

== Manager career ==
Immediately after retiring, Ruiz started coaching, his first stop being Murcia's B-team. In the following three decades he managed another eight clubs, interspersed with several periods of inactivity.

From 1979 to 1981, Ruiz was in charge of UD Las Palmas in the top flight, being sacked early into his second season, which ended in a narrow escape from relegation. In 1984–85 and 1994–95, in the same division, he amassed 30 games for Elche CF and CD Logroñés combined as both teams eventually dropped down a level; the La Rioja side had no fewer than five coaches throughout the campaign, finishing with an all-time low 13 points.

== Honours ==
=== Real Madrid ===
- La Liga: 1956–57, 1957–58, 1960–61, 1961–62
- Copa del Generalísimo: 1961–62
- European Cup: 1956–57, 1957–58, 1958–59, 1959-60
- Intercontinental Cup: 1960
- Latin Cup: 1957
