= Juan Bagur =

Spanish football goalkeeper

Personal information
- Full name: Juan Bagur Coll
- Date of birth: 28 March 1928
- Place of birth: Ciudadela, Spain
- Date of death: 14 November 2013 (aged 85)
- Position: Goalkeeper

Juan Bagur Coll (March 28, 1928 – November 14, 2013) was a Spanish football goalkeeper who played for Real Sociedad. He also played for Real Madrid and Racing Santander.
