= Pachín =

Spanish footballer (1938–2021)

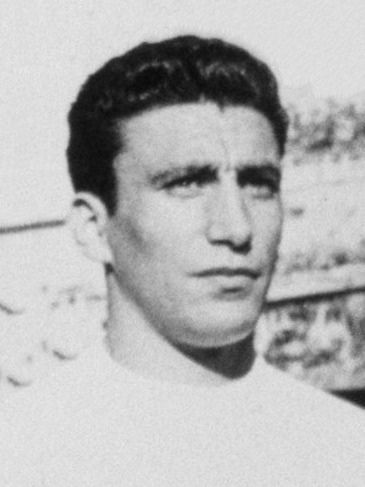
- Pachín in 1962

Personal information
- Full name: Enrique Pérez Díaz
- Date of birth: 28 December 1938
- Place of birth: Torrelavega, Spain
- Date of death: 10 February 2021 (aged 82)
- Place of death: Madrid, Spain
- Height: 1.76 m (5 ft 9 in)
- Position: Defender

Youth career
- Besaya
- Sniace

Senior career*
Years	Team	Apps	(Gls)
1956–1957	Gimnástica		
1957–1958	Burgos		
1958–1959	Osasuna	23	(1)
1959–1968	Real Madrid	148	(2)
1968–1969	Betis	24	(0)
1970–1971	Toluca		

International career
1959–1960	Spain U21	3	(0)
1960–1963	Spain	8	(0)

Managerial career
- 1973–1974: Real Madrid (youth)
- 1974–1975: Pegaso
- 1975–1976: Getafe Deportivo
- 1976–1977: Osasuna
- 1977–1978: Ceuta
- 1978–1979: Valladolid
- 1979–1981: Levante
- 1981: Córdoba
- 1982: Almería
- 1982–1983: Hércules
- 1984–1985: Levante
- 1985–1986: Albacete
- 1987–1988: Levante
- 1988–1989: Granada
- 1989: Pegaso
- * Club domestic league appearances and goals

Enrique Pérez Díaz (28 December 1938 – 10 February 2021), known as Pachín, was a Spanish football defender and manager.

== Club career ==
Born in Torrelavega, Cantabria, Pachín signed with Real Madrid in 1959 from Segunda División club CA Osasuna. He made his La Liga debut on 11 September 1960 in a 1–0 away loss against Atlético Madrid, then proceeded to be a starter in that and the following four seasons.

Pachín left the Merengues in May 1968, having appeared in 218 competitive games and scored two goals. He won 11 major titles during his spell, including seven national championships and the 1960 and 1966 editions of the European Cup, contributing to the latter conquests with eight appearances and a total of 32 during his career.

Aged nearly 30, Pachín returned to division two for the 1968–69 campaign, where he represented Real Betis. He retired in 1971 after a stint with amateurs Club Deportivo Toluca, then worked as a manager for 16 years, never in higher than the second tier – his biggest achievement was to promote Hércules CF to the top flight in 1984, even though he was only in charge for six matches.

== International career ==
Pachín won eight caps for the Spain national team, in three years. His first came on 15 May 1960 in a 3–0 friendly win over England, and he was selected for the squad that competed at the 1962 FIFA World Cup, appearing against Mexico and Brazil in an eventual group stage exit.

== Death ==
Pachín died on 10 February 2021 in Madrid, aged 82.

== Honours ==
Real Madrid

- La Liga: 1960–61, 1961–62, 1962–63, 1963–64, 1964–65, 1966–67, 1967–68
- Copa del Generalísimo: 1961–62
- European Cup: 1959–60, 1965–66
- Intercontinental Cup: 1960
