= Enrique Mateos =

Spanish footballer (1934–2001)

Personal information
- Full name: Enrique Mateos Mancebo
- Date of birth: 15 July 1934
- Place of birth: Madrid, Spain
- Date of death: 6 July 2001 (aged 66)
- Place of death: Seville, Spain
- Height: 1.67 m (5 ft 6 in)
- Position: Striker

Youth career
- Boetticher y Navarro
- Real Madrid

Senior career*
Years	Team	Apps	(Gls)
1952–1953	Plus Ultra	11	(4)
1953–1961	Real Madrid	52	(27)
1961–1964	Sevilla	55	(18)
1964–1965	Recreativo	17	(7)
1965	Betis	6	(2)
1965	Recreativo	5	(2)
1965–1966	Betis	10	(1)
1966–1967	Gimnástica	23	(1)
1968	Cleveland Stokers	31	(16)
1969	East London Celtic		
1970–1971	Toluca Santander		
Total		210	(78)

International career
1957–1960	Spain B	3	(3)
1957–1961	Spain	8	(3)

Managerial career
- ?–?: Fuencarral
- 1975–1976: Pegaso
- 1976–1977: Cádiz
- 1978: Deportivo La Coruña
- 1982–1983: Fuengirola
- 1984–1985: Orihuela
- 1985: Linares
- 1987–1988: Ronda
- 1988: Fuengirola
- 1992: Orihuela
- * Club domestic league appearances and goals

Enrique Mateos Mancebo (15 July 1934 – 6 July 2001) was a Spanish footballer who played as a striker.

He amassed La Liga totals of 123 games and 48 goals over the course of 13 seasons, representing in the competition Real Madrid, Sevilla and Betis.

== Club career ==
Born in Madrid, Mateos finished his graduation at local and national powerhouse Real Madrid. He was mainly a reserve player during his eight-year spell with the first team, which won 13 major titles during that timeframe; his best output came during the 1956–57 season, when he scored a career-best 14 goals in 21 games en route to the La Liga championship; additionally, he netted nine times in 16 appearances combined in the European Cup, winning the tournament on four occasions.

Mateos left the Merengues in the 1961 summer, with official totals of 93 matches and 50 goals. He subsequently represented, in his country, Sevilla FC, Recreativo de Huelva, Real Betis (two spells with both clubs) and Gimnástica de Torrelavega, suffering a serious injury whilst at the service of the first from which he never fully recovered; until his retirement at the age of 37, he also played for the Cleveland Stokers in the North American Soccer League and East London Celtic in South Africa.

Subsequently, Mateos worked as a manager for roughly twenty years. His biggest achievement at the professional level consisted of leading Cádiz CF to its first-ever promotion to the top flight in 1977, being sacked early into the following campaign as the Andalusians were eventually relegated back.

== International career ==
Mateos earned eight caps for the Spain football team, during four years. He scored in his debut on 31 March 1957, a 5–0 friendly win in Belgium.

== Career statistics ==
#	Date	Venue	Opponent	Score	Result	Competition
1.	31 March 1957	Heysel, Brussels, Belgium	Belgium	0–3	0–5	Friendly
2.	16 May 1957	Santiago Bernabéu, Madrid, Spain	Scotland	1–0	4–1	1958 World Cup qualification
3.	22 November 1959	Mestalla, Valencia, Spain	Austria	6–2	6–3	Friendly

== Death ==
Mateos died in Seville on 6 July 2001, two weeks shy of his 67th birthday.

== Honours ==
Real Madrid

- La Liga: 1953–54, 1954–55, 1956–57, 1957–58, 1960–61
- European Cup: 1956–57, 1957–58, 1958–59, 1959–60
