= Miche (footballer) =

Spanish footballer (1935–2014)

Miguel García Martín (19 May 1935 – 22 March 2014), known as Miche, was a Spanish footballer who played as a defender.

He played 115 games in La Liga for Real Madrid, Osasuna, Deportivo de La Coruña, Real Valladolid and Hércules. He won the European Cup in 1959 and 1960 for Real Madrid.

== Career ==
Born in Salamanca in Castile and León, Miche began his career in the Tercera División with his hometown club UD Salamanca. In 1957–58, he was loaned to Atlético Ceuta in the Segunda División during his military service.

Miche joined Real Madrid in 1958. In his first season, the club won the European Cup, with him playing all three games of a semi-final against city rivals Atlético Madrid in the semi-finals. His team defended their title a year later, in which he played both legs of a quarter-final win over Nice and the second leg of the semi-final against compatriots Barcelona, a 3–1 win at the Camp Nou. Domestically, he played in the side that lost the Copa del Generalísimo final to Atlético in 1960, and won La Liga in 1960–61.

In 1961, Miche was loaned to Osasuna. He later played in the top flight for Deportivo de La Coruña, Real Valladolid and Hércules. He scored twice in his career: in a 6–2 Osasuna home win over Málaga in the last 32 of the cup on 28 February 1962, and in Deportivo's 3–2 loss at Sevilla on 13 January 1963.
