= Rafael Lesmes =

Spanish footballer

Personal information
- Full name: Rafael Lesmes Bobed
- Date of birth: 9 November 1926
- Place of birth: Ceuta, Spain
- Date of death: 8 October 2012 (aged 85)
- Place of death: Valladolid, Spain
- Height: 1.78 m (5 ft 10 in)
- Position: Defender

Youth career
- África Ceutí
- 1940–1944: Ibarrola
- 1944–1945: Betis Jadú

Senior career*
Years	Team	Apps	(Gls)
1945–1949	Atlético Tetuán		
1949–1952	Valladolid	78	(1)
1950	→ Atlético Madrid (loan)	0	(0)
1952–1960	Real Madrid	163	(0)
1960–1962	Valladolid	27	(0)
Total		268	(1)

International career
1955–1958	Spain	2	(0)
- * Club domestic league appearances and goals

Rafael Lesmes Bobed (9 November 1926 – 8 October 2012) was a Spanish footballer who played as a defender.

== Club career ==
Lesmes was born in Ceuta. Over 12 La Liga seasons, he played for Real Valladolid (two spells) and Real Madrid, appearing in 263 games in the competition. He began his career with local Atlético Tetuán, and retired in 1962 at the age of 35.

With Real Madrid, Lesmes was part of the team that won five consecutive European Cups. Subsequently, he worked with the club as a scout.

== International career ==
Lesmes was selected for Spain's 1950 FIFA World Cup squad as an uncapped member. He would have to wait nearly five years to make his debut, however, appearing in a 2–1 friendly loss to France on 17 March 1955, in Madrid.

Lesmes' second and last international was a 6–2 win against Northern Ireland on 15 October 1958, in another exhibition game.

== Personal life and death ==
Lesmes' older brother, Francisco, was also a footballer and a defender. Often referred to as Lesmes I as he shared teams with his sibling for four seasons, he spent his entire professional career with Valladolid, also being a Spanish international.

Rafael died in Valladolid on 8 October 2012, one month shy of his 86th birthday.

== Honours ==
Real Madrid

- La Liga: 1953–54, 1954–55, 1956–57, 1957–58
- European Cup: 1955–56, 1956–57, 1957–58, 1958–59, 1959–60
- Latin Cup: 1955, 1957
