= Juan Santisteban =

Spanish footballer and manager

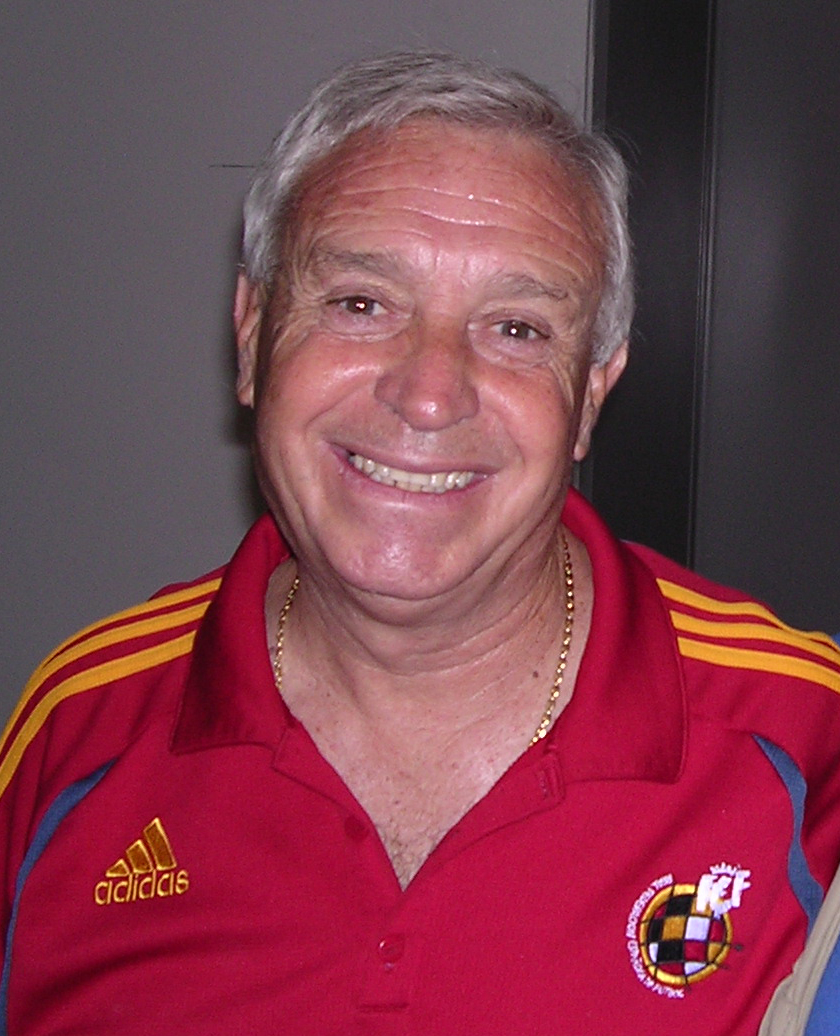
- Santisteban in 2007

Personal information
- Full name: Juan Santisteban Troyano
- Date of birth: 8 December 1936 (age 89)
- Place of birth: Seville, Spain
- Height: 1.73 m (5 ft 8 in)
- Position: Midfielder

Youth career
- 1952: Betis
- 1952–1956: Real Madrid

Senior career*
Years	Team	Apps	(Gls)
1955–1961	Real Madrid	83	(2)
1961–1963	Venezia	39	(2)
1963–1964	Real Madrid	3	(0)
1965–1966	Betis	5	(1)
1967–1968	Baltimore Bays	39	(2)

International career
1957–1959	Spain	7	(0)

Managerial career
- 1968–1969: Plus Ultra
- 1974–1977: Real Madrid (youth)
- 1977–1979: Castilla
- 1979–1981: Real Madrid (assistant)
- 1981–1982: Castilla
- 1982–1984: Real Madrid (assistant)
- 1984–1987: Castilla
- 1988–2001: Spain U16
- 1990–2008: Spain U17
- 2002–2004: Spain U21
- 2005: Spain U23
- 2007: Spain U19
Medal record
Men's football
Representing Spain (as manager)
FIFA U-17 World Cup
Runner-up	2007
- * Club domestic league appearances and goals

Juan Santisteban Troyano (born 8 December 1936) is a Spanish former football midfielder and manager. As a player with Real Madrid, he won four La Liga titles and four European Cup titles.

== Honours ==
=== Player ===
Real Madrid

- La Liga: 1956–57, 1957–58, 1960–61, 1963–64
- European Cup: 1956–57, 1957–58, 1958–59, 1959–60

=== Manager ===
Spain U23

- Mediterranean Games: 2005

Spain U19

- UEFA European Under-19 Football Championship: 2007

Spain U17

- UEFA European Under-17 Football Championship: 2007, 2008, Runner-up 2003, 2004
- FIFA U-17 World Cup: Runner-up 1991, 2003, 2007

Spain U16

- UEFA European Under-16 Football Championship: 1991, 1997, 1999, 2001, Runner-up 1992, 1995

=== Individual ===
- UEFA President's Award: 2001
