= 1960 Intercontinental Cup =

- Event: Intercontinental Cup
Peñarol	Real Madrid
(Uruguay)	(Spain)
- Real Madrid won 3–1 on points

First leg
Peñarol	Real Madrid
0	0
- Date: 3 July 1960
- Venue: Estadio Centenario, Montevideo
- Referee: José Luis Praddaude (Argentina)
- Attendance: 71,872

Second leg
Real Madrid	Peñarol
5	1
- Date: 4 September 1960
- Venue: Santiago Bernabéu, Madrid
- Referee: Ken Aston (England)
- Attendance: 90,000

The 1960 Intercontinental Cup was the inaugural edition of the matchup between the reigning European football champion and the reigning South American football champion. The idea was born of discussions between Pierre Delauney, UEFA secretary and José Ramón de Freitas, CONMEBOL secretary.

The two-legged tie was contested between Spanish club Real Madrid (1959–60 European Cup winner) and Uruguayan club Peñarol (1960 Copa Libertadores winner). The first match-up ended with Los Merengues holding Peñarol to a 0–0 draw at Montevideo's Estadio Centenario, and then soundly winning 5–1 in the return leg at Madrid's Santiago Bernabéu thanks to the marvelous performances of Alfredo Di Stéfano and Ferenc Puskás.

== Qualified teams ==
Team	Qualification	Previous finals app.
(Spain) Real Madrid	1959–60 European Cup champion	None
(Uruguay) Peñarol	1960 Copa Libertadores champion	None

Bold indicates winning years

== Venues ==
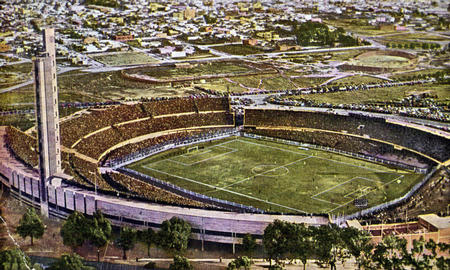
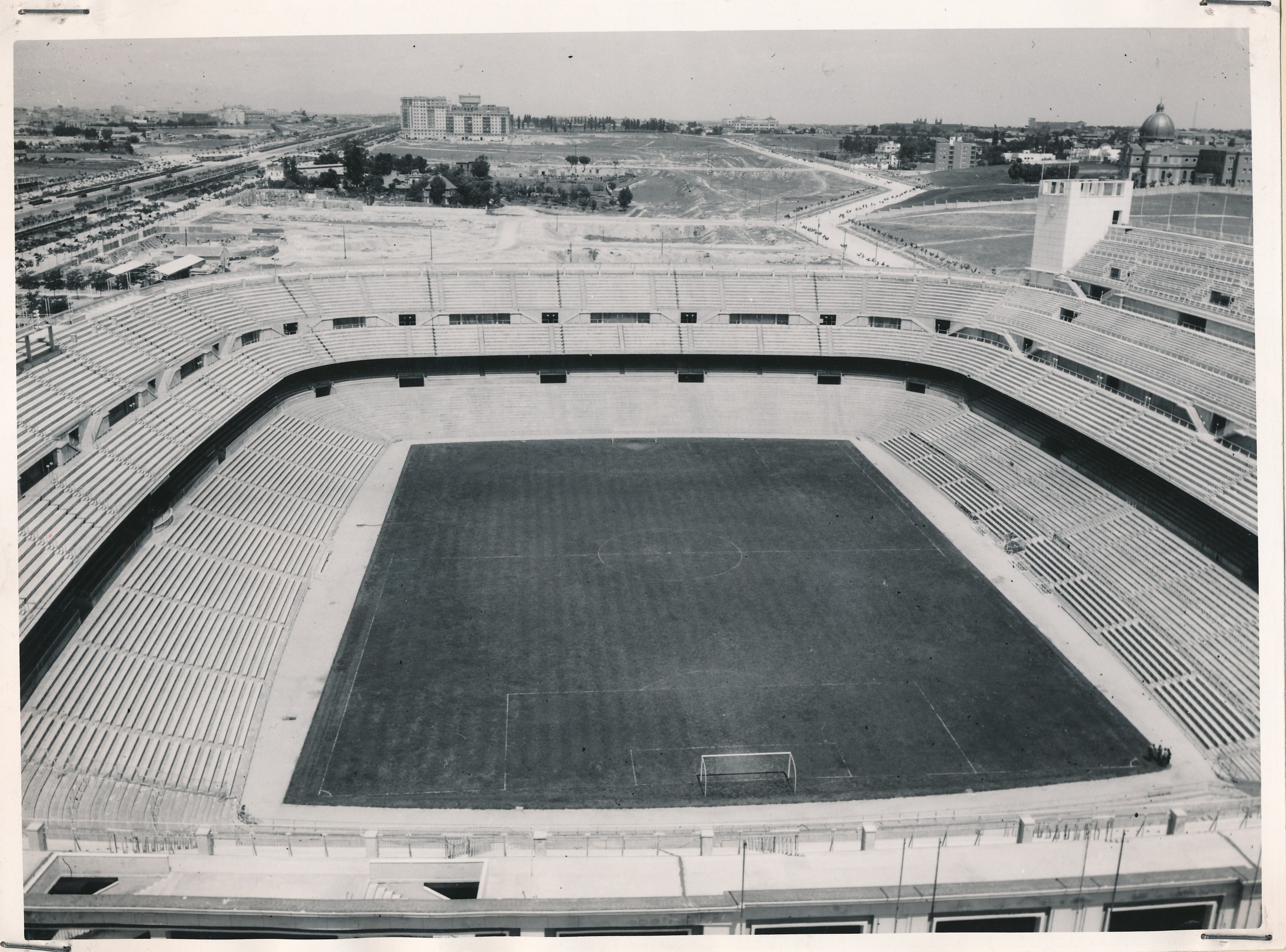
Estadio Centenario (left) and Santiago Bernabéu Stadium, venues for the series

== Match details ==
=== First leg ===
1960 Intercontinental Cup
3 July 1960
First leg

Peñarol (Uruguay)	0–0	(Spain) Real Madrid
	Report

Estadio Centenario, Montevideo
Attendance: 71,872
Referee: José Luis Praddaude (Argentina)

**Peñarol**	**Real Madrid**

GK	**1**	(Uruguay) Luis Maidana
DF		(Uruguay) Santiago Pino
DF		(Uruguay) William Martínez (c)
MF		(Uruguay) Walter Aguerre
MF		(Uruguay) Néstor Gonçalves
MF		(Brazil) Salvador
FW	**7**	(Uruguay) Luis Cubilla
FW		(Argentina) Carlos Linazza
FW		(Uruguay) Juan Hohberg
FW	**9**	(Ecuador) Alberto Spencer
FW		(Uruguay) Carlos Borges
Manager:
(Uruguay) Roberto Scarone

GK	**1**	(Argentina) Rogelio Domínguez
DF		(Spain) José Santamaría
DF		(Spain) Marquitos
MF		(Spain) Pachín
MF		(Spain) José María Zárraga (c)
MF		(Spain) José María Vidal
FW		(Spain) Luis del Sol
RW		(Brazil) Canário
FW	**9**	(Spain) Alfredo Di Stéfano
FW	**10**	(Hungary) Ferenc Puskás
FW	**11**	(Spain) Manolín
Manager:
(Spain) Miguel Muñoz

=== Second leg ===
4 September 1960
Second leg

Real Madrid (Spain)	5–1	(Uruguay) Peñarol
Puskás 2', 8'; Di Stéfano 3'; Herrera 40'; Gento 54'	Report	Spencer 80'

Santiago Bernabéu, Madrid
Attendance: 90,000
Referee: Ken Aston (England)

**Real Madrid**	**Peñarol**

GK	**1**	(Argentina) Rogelio Domínguez
DF		(Spain) José Santamaría
DF		(Spain) Marquitos
MF		(Spain) Pachín
MF		(Spain) José María Zárraga (c)
MF		(Spain) José María Vidal
FW		(Spain) Luis del Sol
RW		(Spain) Chus Herrera
FW	**9**	(Spain) Alfredo Di Stéfano
FW	**10**	(Hungary) Ferenc Puskás
FW	**11**	(Spain) Francisco Gento
Manager:
(Spain) Miguel Muñoz

GK	**1**	(Uruguay) Luis Maidana
DF		(Uruguay) Santiago Pino
DF		(Uruguay) William Martínez (c)
MF		(Uruguay) Walter Aguerre
MF		(Uruguay) Francisco Majewski
MF		(Brazil) Salvador
FW	**7**	(Uruguay) Luis Cubilla
FW		(Argentina) Carlos Linazza
FW		(Uruguay) Juan Hohberg
FW	**9**	(Ecuador) Alberto Spencer
FW		(Uruguay) Carlos Borges
Manager:
(Uruguay) Roberto Scarone

== See also ==
- 1959–60 European Cup
- 1960 Copa Libertadores
- 1966 Intercontinental Cup – contested between same teams
- Real Madrid CF in international football competitions
