= Chus Herrera =

Spanish footballer

Personal information
- Full name: Jesús Herrera Alonso
- Date of birth: 5 February 1938
- Place of birth: Cabueñes, Spain
- Date of death: 20 October 1962 (aged 24)
- Place of death: Oviedo, Spain
- Height: 1.72 m (5 ft 8 in)
- Position: Forward

Youth career
- 1952–1954: Ovetense
- 1954–1955: Oviedo

Senior career*
Years	Team	Apps	(Gls)
1955–1956	Vetusta		
1956	→ Juvencia (loan)		
1956–1958	Oviedo	60	(18)
1958–1962	Real Madrid	50	(15)
1962	→ Real Sociedad (loan)	6	(2)
Total		116	(35)

International career
1959	Spain U21	1	(0)
1960	Spain B	1	(0)
1960	Spain	1	(0)
- * Club domestic league appearances and goals

Jesús 'Chus' Herrera Alonso (5 February 1938 – 20 October 1962) was a Spanish footballer who played as a forward.

== Club career ==
Born in Cabueñes, Gijón, Herrera made his professional debuts with Real Oviedo in Segunda División, playing two seasons in that level with the club. In 1958, he joined Real Madrid.

During his spell with the latter, Herrera was used mostly as a backup to the likes of Alfredo Di Stéfano, Francisco Gento, Raymond Kopa, Ferenc Puskás and Héctor Rial. In the 1959–60 edition of the European Cup, he scored three goals in five games – two against Jeunesse Esch (7–0 home win) and one against OGC Nice (2–3 away loss) – helping the team renew their supremacy in the competition.

On 4 September 1960, Herrera netted the fourth goal in a 5–1 defeat of C.A. Peñarol in the Intercontinental Cup (also the aggregate score). Shortly after, however, he was deemed surplus to requirements at Real Madrid and, in January 1962, was loaned to fellow La Liga side Real Sociedad until the end of the campaign, which ended in relegation for the Basques.

== International career ==
Herrera played one game with Spain, appearing in a friendly with Italy on 13 March 1960, in Barcelona (3–1 win).

== Death ==
Shortly after arriving at Real Sociedad, Herrera retired from football. On 20 October 1962, aged only 24, he died from cancer in Oviedo.

== Personal life ==
Herrera's father, Eduardo, was also a footballer and a forward. He was a leading figure for Oviedo in the 1930s/1940s.

== Honours ==
Real Madrid

- La Liga: 1960–61
- European Cup: 1958–59, 1959–60
- Intercontinental Cup: 1960
