= Ramón Marsal =

Spanish footballer

Ramón Marsal Ribó

Ramón Marsal Ribó (12 December 1934 – 22 January 2007) was a Spanish footballer, who played three seasons in the dominating Real Madrid team in the 1950s. His career came to an early end due to an injury.

== Career ==
Ramón Marsal Ribó was born in Madrid and started playing football at school, where he was soon scouted by Real Madrid's youth coaches and was invited to join the club. As a result, he joined Real Madrid's youth team in these days AD Plus Ultra in the 1948-49 season. To improve and develop as a player he was transferred to Hércules CF and later to Real Murcia. He was called back by Real Madrid for his good performances at Hércules and Murcia, to join their first team squad.

He made his official Real Madrid debut during the fourth match of the 1955–56 season where Cultural Leonesa were the opponents, in the time Real played their matches at the Estadio Chamartín. That season the European Cup 1955–56 was held for the first time. Real reached the final and Marsal was chosen in the starting eleven by coach José Villalonga. At the Parc des Princes stadium French team Stade de Reims was beat 4-3, making Marsal a European Champion at the age of 21.

In his second season at Real Madrid he scored one of the most spectacular goals in the club's history. Teammate Alfredo Di Stéfano described the goal as follows: "He zigzagged across the pitch and scored an extraordinary goal." The match against Athletic de Bilbao was won 6-0, but Marsal's goal was the story of the day. The goal is still remembered as "the goal of more than one minute". In this season Real Madrid won the European Cup again, but Marsal did not play in the final.

On 20 April 1958, during a match against Celta de Vigo in his third season at the club made a wrong move trying to control the ball and hurt his knee badly. During the surgery of his knee, one of the doctors got loose and caused him hemorrhages and a large blood clot that forced his early retirement from football. He tried to come back into the team via Plus Ultra and Real Murcia again, but never succeeded in getting his former skills back. Also in this season Real Madrid managed to win the European Cup, but due to his injury Marsal did not play in the final.

In total he played 59 official matches for Real Madrid in which he scored 27 goals. Three of those were winning goals in La Liga confrontations, while three other ones made the decision in meetings for the European Cup. He also played one match for Spain when they faced Portugal on 13 April 1958 in Madrid. Spain won the match 1-0.

After his career he became a plumber, although he had studied to become an industrial expert. In later years he became the manager of a construction company, as well as at an international relations agency.

Ramón Marsal Ribó died on 22 January 2007, aged 72.
