= José María Vidal =

Spanish footballer

Personal information
- Full name: José María Vidal Bravo
- Date of birth: 6 May 1935
- Place of birth: Madrid, Spain
- Date of death: 1 August 1986 (aged 51)
- Place of death: Valencia, Spain
- Height: 1.79 m (5 ft 10 1/2 in)
- Position: Midfielder

Youth career
- Real Madrid

Senior career*
Years	Team	Apps	(Gls)
1953–1956	Real Madrid	0	(0)
1953–1954	→ Salamanca (loan)		
1954–1955	→ Zaragoza (loan)	16	(2)
1955–1956	→ Plus Ultra (loan)	26	(7)
1956–1958	Granada	33	(8)
1957–1958	→ Atlético Ceuta (loan)	25	(1)
1958–1959	Murcia	27	(4)
1959–1963	Real Madrid	63	(2)
1963	Málaga	6	(0)
1963–1965	Levante	48	(2)
1965–1966	Valladolid	4	(0)
1966–1967	Sparta Rotterdam	1	(0)
1967	Philadelphia Spartans	8	(0)

International career
1960–1961	Spain	4	(0)
- * Club domestic league appearances and goals

José María Vidal Bravo (6 May 1935 – 1 August 1986) was a Spanish footballer who played as a midfielder in the mid 20th century.

== Club career ==
Born in Madrid, Vidal spent nine years of his senior career linked to Real Madrid, but he was loaned several times during his spell. He only spent four seasons with the first team, winning two La Liga championships and one Copa del Generalísimo; additionally, in the 1959–60 edition of the European Cup, he contributed with six games and one goal as the tournament ended in conquest.

Vidal amassed Spanish top flight totals of 117 matches and four goals, also representing in the competition CD Málaga and Levante UD. He died at the age of 51 in Valencia, from a heart attack.

== International career ==
Vidal earned four caps for the Spanish national team in slightly less than one year, making his debut on 14 July 1960 by playing the second half of a 4–0 friendly win in Chile.

== Honours ==
Real Madrid

- European Cup: 1959–60
- Intercontinental Cup: 1960
- La Liga: 1960–61, 1961–62
- Copa del Generalísimo: 1961–62
