= Rogelio Domínguez =

Argentine footballer

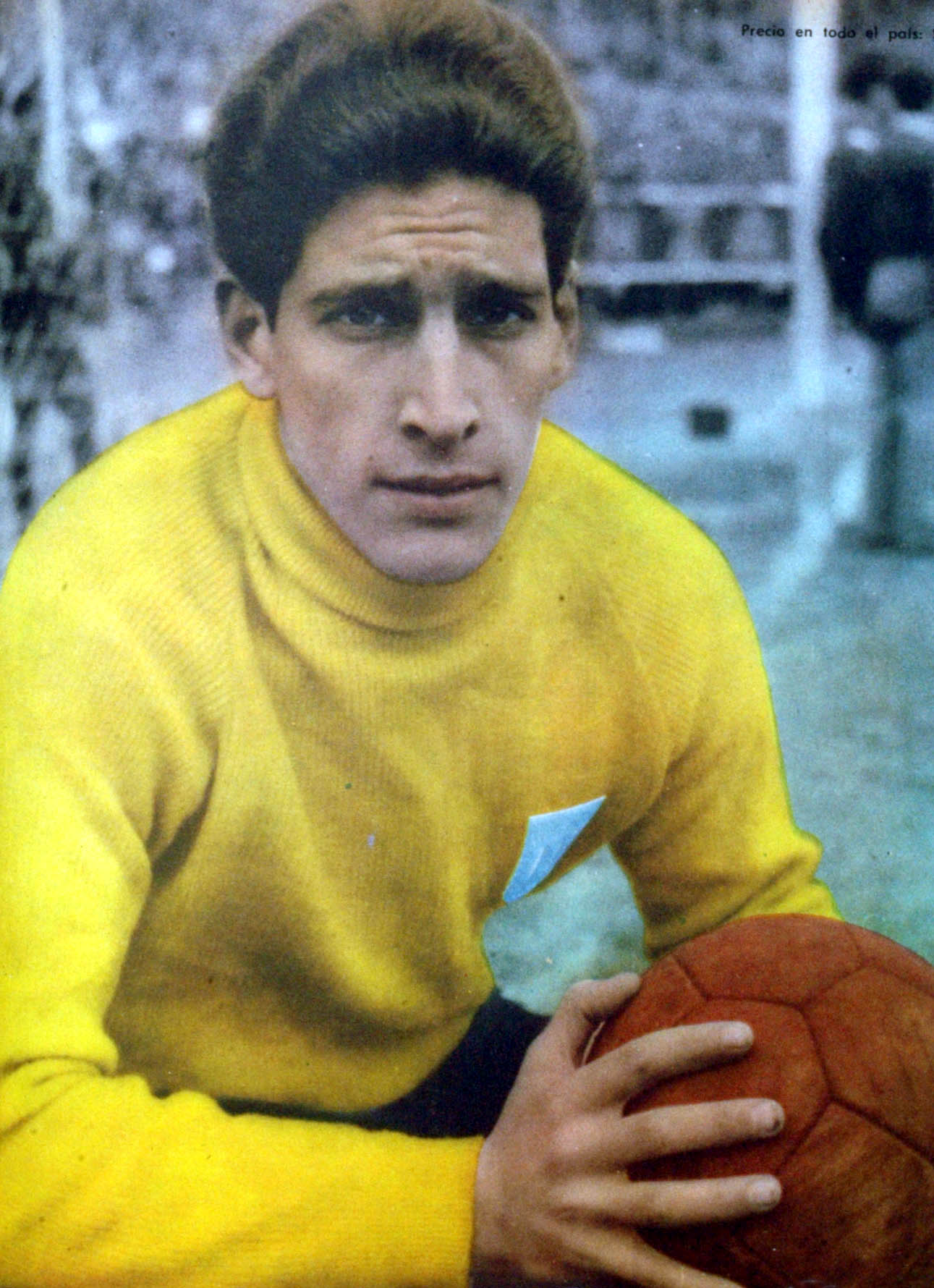
- Domínguez while playing for Racing Club in 1956.

Personal information
- Full name: Rogelio Antonio Domínguez López
- Date of birth: 9 March 1931
- Place of birth: Buenos Aires, Argentina
- Date of death: 23 July 2004 (aged 73)
- Height: 1.83 m (6 ft 0 in)
- Position: Goalkeeper

Youth career
- 1946–1948: River Plate

Senior career*
| Years | Team | Apps | (Gls) |
| 1948–1956 | Racing Club | 121 | (0) |
| 1957–1962 | Real Madrid | 51 | (0) |
| 1962–1963 | River Plate | 12 | (0) |
| 1964–1965 | Vélez Sarsfield | 33 | (0) |
| 1966 | CA Cerro | | |
| 1966–1968 | Nacional | | |
| 1968–1971 | Flamengo | 41 | (0) |

International career
| 1951–1963 | Argentina | 58 | (0) |

Managerial career
- 1971: San Lorenzo
- 1972: Chacarita Juniors
- 1973–1975: Boca Juniors
- 1976: Gimnasia La Plata
- 1977: San Lorenzo
- 1979: Atlético Tucumán
- 1981: Loma Negra
- 1982–1983: Racing Club
- 1986: Racing Club
- 1988: Quilmes
- 1989: Everton
Medal record
Men's football
Representing Argentina
Pan American Games
| Gold medal – first place | 1951 Buenos Aires | Team |
- * Club domestic league appearances and goals

Rogelio Antonio Domínguez López (Note: In this Spanish name, the first or paternal surname is Domínguez and the second or maternal family name is López.) (9 March 1931 – 23 July 2004) was an Argentine football goalkeeper who played for Real Madrid and was part of their European Cup victories in 1958, 1959 and 1960. He was in Argentina's squad for the 1962 FIFA World Cup.

== Biography ==
Domínguez was discovered during a match by the cofounder of the famous Club River Plate, Carlos Peucelle, who persuaded Dominguez to begin to train at River Plate in March 1946. He was seventeen years old when he was discovered by delegates of the Racing Club of Avellaneda and he was signed immediately.

In 1957 Domínguez signed for Real Madrid in Spain. After several successful seasons with the club, he returned to South America where he played for River Plate and Vélez Sarsfield in Argentina, and then CA Cerro, Nacional in Uruguay and Flamengo in Brazil.

== International career ==
In 1951 he won the Panamerican Championship playing for the Argentina national football team; to which he'd belonged for 12 years, from 1951 to 1963. He was chosen Best America's Goalkeeper for two consecutive seasons, in 1956 and 1957 and was part of the triumphant team that claimed the 1957 Copa América title.

== After playing ==
After 23 years at the top of worldwide football he quit playing at the age of 40 in 1971 and become manager of San Lorenzo, Argentine National Sub-champion in 1971, Chacarita Juniors (1972), Boca Juniors (1973–1975) and many other clubs including Gimnasia de La Plata, Club Atlético Tucumán, Loma Negra, Quilmes, Racing Club and Chilean club Everton de Viña del Mar.

Domínguez died of a heart attack on 23 July 2004 in the Hospital Penna of the Flores district of Buenos Aires.

== Honors ==
Racing

- Primera División: 1951

Real Madrid

- Copa del Rey runner-up: 1957–58, 1959–60, 1960–61
- La Liga: 1957–58, 1960–61, 1961–62
- European Cup: 1957–58, 1958–59, 1959–60
- Intercontinental Cup: 1960

River Plate

- Primera División runner-up: 1962, 1963

Nacional

- Torneo Cuadrangular: 1967
- Uruguayan Primera División runner-up: 1967, 1968
- Copa Libertadores runner-up: 1967

Flamengo

- Campeonato Carioca runner-up: 1969

Argentina

- Pan American Games: 1951
- Copa América: 1957
