= José Santamaría =

Association football player and manager (1929–2026)

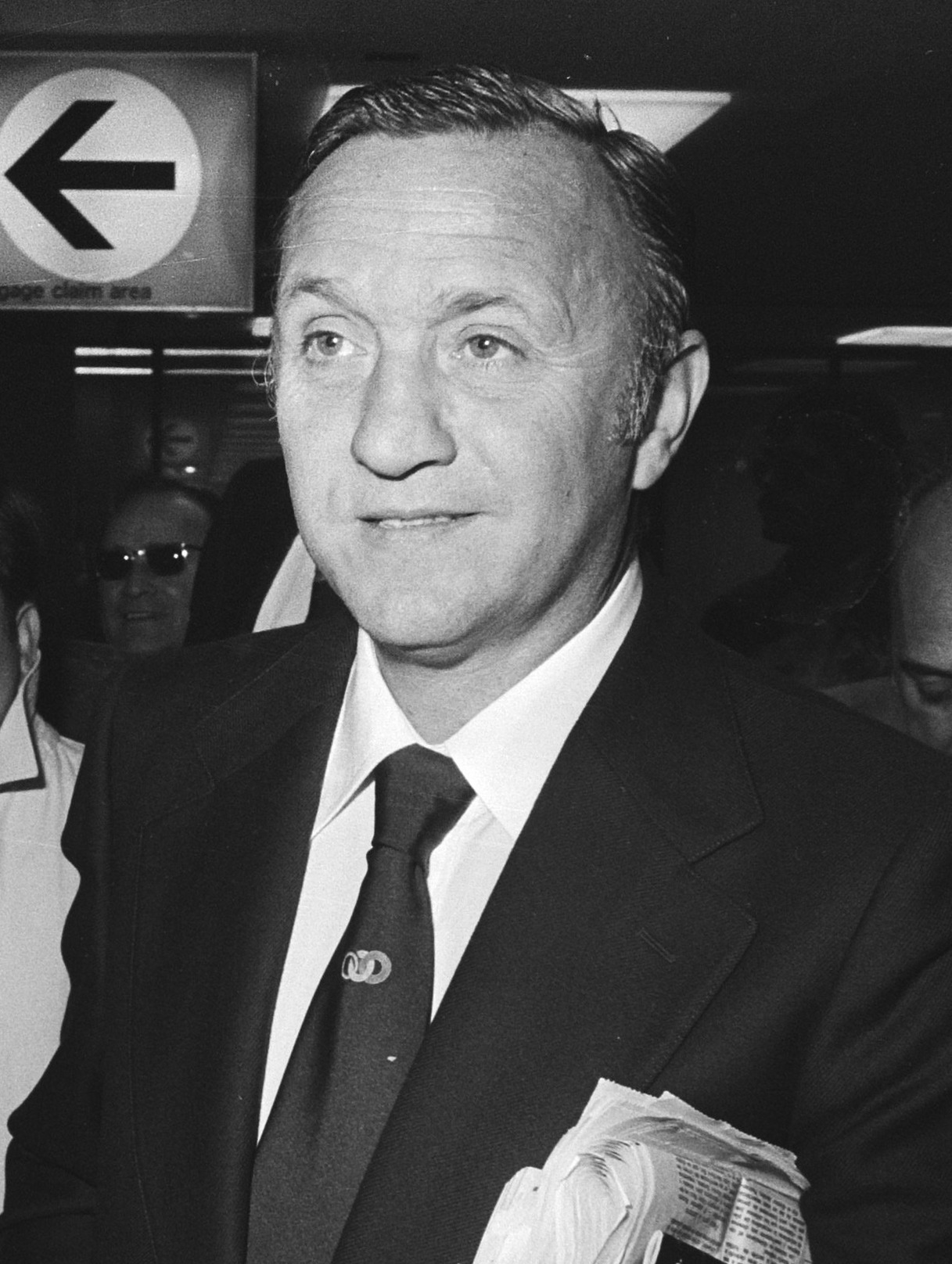
- Santamaría in 1976

Personal information
- Full name: José Emilio Santamaría Iglesias
- Date of birth: 31 July 1929
- Place of birth: Montevideo, Uruguay
- Date of death: 15 April 2026 (aged 96)
- Place of death: Madrid, Spain
- Height: 1.78 m (5 ft 10 in)
- Position: Centre-back

Youth career
- Atlético Pocitos

Senior career*
Years	Team	Apps	(Gls)
1948–1957	Nacional	112	(3)
1957–1966	Real Madrid	227	(2)
Total		339	(5)

International career
1952–1957	Uruguay	20	(0)
1958–1962	Spain	16	(0)

Managerial career
- 1968–1971: Spain youth/olympic
- 1971–1977: Español
- 1978–1980: Spain U21
- 1980–1982: Spain
- * Club domestic league appearances and goals

José Emilio Santamaría Iglesias (31 July 1929 – 15 April 2026) was a professional football player and manager. A central defender, he spent his 18-year club career with Nacional and Real Madrid, winning 12 titles with the latter including four European Cups.

Born in Uruguay, Santamaría represented both the Uruguay and Spain national teams. He later embarked on a coaching career, which included a two-year spell as manager of the Spanish national side.

== Club career ==
Born in Montevideo to Spanish parents, Santamaría played for local Nacional in his country, winning five national championships during his spell. The 28-year-old moved abroad in 1957, signing with Real Madrid where he remained until the end of his career.

Santamaría totalled 34 appearances between La Liga and the European Cup in his first season at the Santiago Bernabéu Stadium, winning both tournaments. He went on to add a further ten major trophies to his collection, being first-choice for the vast majority of his stint.

Having earned the nickname 'The Wall' for his consistent defensive displays, Santamaría retired at the end of the 1965–66 campaign aged 36, featuring twice in that year's European Cup en route to another triumph (against Feyenoord and at Kilmarnock). He played 337 competitive matches for Real Madrid.

== International career ==
Santamaría was first called up to play for Uruguay in the 1950 FIFA World Cup in Brazil, being selected to fill an inside forward slot in the squad but seeing the request denied by his club on the grounds that he was a defender. Four years later, however, he was an integral part of the team at the World Cup in Switzerland, helping them to a final fourth position and earning a total of 20 caps.

He began representing Spain in 1958, his debut coming on 15 October against Northern Ireland (6–2 friendly win in Madrid). He appeared with his adopted nation at the 1962 World Cup, playing against Czechoslovakia (1–0 loss) and Mexico (1–0 victory) in an eventual group-stage exit.

== Coaching career ==
Santamaría was appointed at Español in the summer of 1971, for his first club coaching experience. He led the Catalans to two top-four finishes in a six-year tenure, including a third place in the 1972–73 season just three points behind champions Atlético Madrid, being dismissed on 21 December 1977 following a 4–0 away loss against Racing de Santander.

After working with the youth sides, including two years with the under-21s, Santamaría was appointed full manager for the 1982 World Cup, due to be played on home soil. He was relieved of his duties at the end of the competition as Spain were unable to progress from the second group phase, and quit football altogether to pursue other interests.

== Death ==
Santamaría died in Madrid on 15 April 2026, at the age of 96.

== Honours ==
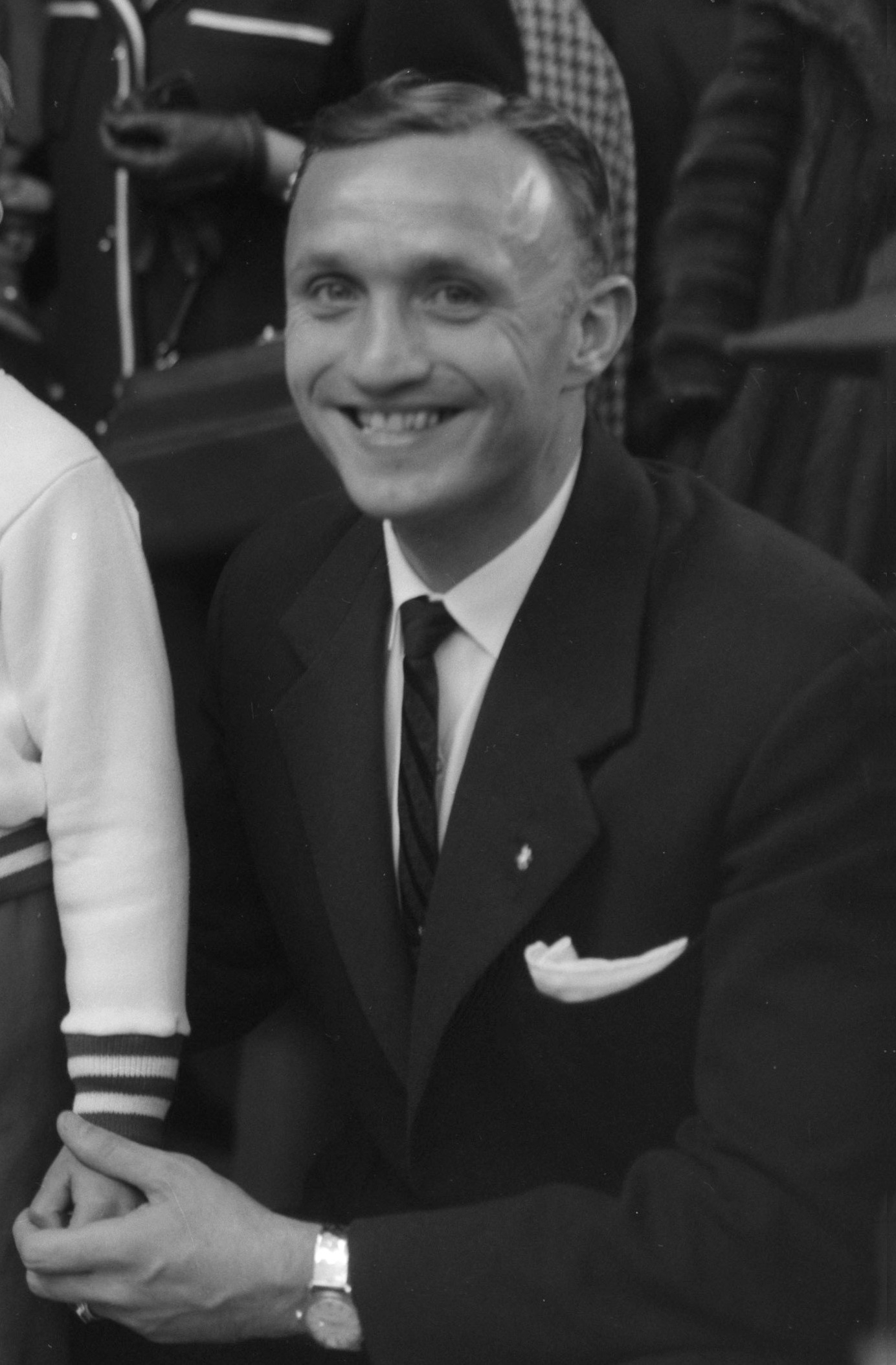
Santamaría in 1962

Nacional

- Uruguayan Primera División: 1950, 1952, 1955, 1956, 1957

Real Madrid

- La Liga: 1957–58, 1960–61, 1961–62, 1962–63, 1963–64, 1964–65
- Copa del Generalísimo: 1961–62
- European Cup: 1957–58, 1958–59, 1959–60, 1965–66
- Intercontinental Cup: 1960

Individual

- FIFA World Cup All-Star Team: 1954
- World Soccer World XI: 1960
- IFFHS Uruguayan Men's Dream Team

== See also ==
- List of Spain international footballers born outside Spain
