= Miguel Muñoz =

Spanish footballer and manager (1922–1990)

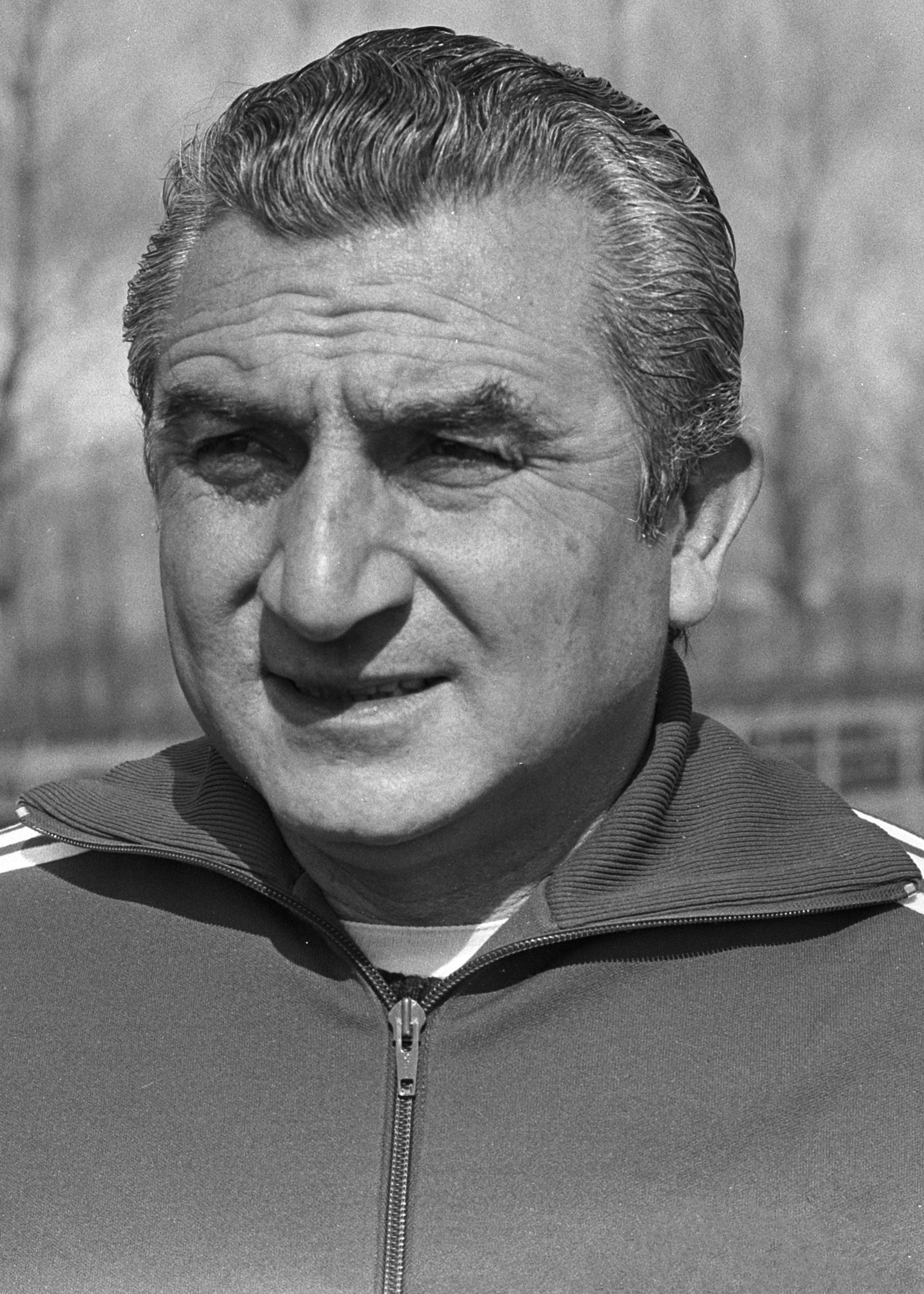
- Muñoz in 1973

Personal information
- Full name: Miguel Muñoz Mozún
- Date of birth: 19 January 1922
- Place of birth: Madrid, Spain
- Date of death: 16 July 1990 (aged 68)
- Place of death: Madrid, Spain
- Height: 1.84 m (6 ft 0 in)
- Position: Midfielder

Youth career
- 1940–1941: Ferroviaria
- 1941–1942: Girod
- 1942–1943: Imperio

Senior career*
Years	Team	Apps	(Gls)
1943–1944	Logroñés		
1944–1946	Racing Santander	42	(19)
1946–1948	Celta	36	(1)
1948–1958	Real Madrid	223	(23)
Total		301	(43)

International career
1949	Spain B	1	(0)
1948–1955	Spain	7	(0)

Managerial career
- 1959: Real Madrid
- 1959–1960: Plus Ultra
- 1960–1974: Real Madrid
- 1969: Spain
- 1975–1976: Granada
- 1977–1979: Las Palmas
- 1979–1982: Sevilla
- 1982–1988: Spain
Medal record
Men's football
Representing Spain (as manager)
UEFA European Championship
Runner-up	1984
- * Club domestic league appearances and goals

Miguel Muñoz Mozún (19 January 1922 – 16 July 1990) was a Spanish football player and manager. A midfielder, he spent the majority of his career at Real Madrid before going on to coach the club, where he is widely considered one of the most successful and greatest managers in football history, leading the team to two European Cup victories and nine La Liga titles (winning seven major titles in both major competitions combined as a player). Muñoz later had a six-year coaching spell with the Spain national team, and led them to the final of Euro 1984.

== Playing career ==
Born in Madrid, Muñoz played for various junior teams in the area, but initially failed to attract the attention of Real Madrid, going on to subsequently represent Logroñés, Racing Santander and Celta. In 1948, he, together with the likes of Pahiño, helped the latter finish fourth in La Liga and reach the Copa del Generalísimo final, where he scored in the 1–4 defeat to Sevilla.

The following season, both players signed for Real Madrid, and Muñoz went on to appear in 347 official matches with the club from the capital. Additionally, he won seven caps for Spain, but never appeared in any major tournament.

Muñoz scored Real's first ever goal in the European Cup, helping to a 2–0 away win against Servette on 8 September 1955. Subsequently, he captained the team in two consecutive competition wins in 1955–56 and 1956–57, and retired from football the following year at nearly 36.

== Coaching career ==
Muñoz served a brief apprenticeship as coach of Real's reserve team, then named Plus Ultra, before being appointed coach of the main squad in 1959. His time in charge was one of the club's most successful eras as, under his guidance, it won the league nine times; this included a five-in-a-row sequence (1961–65) and another three consecutive.

On the European front, Muñoz led Real Madrid to two more wins in the European Cup, in 1959–60 and 1965–66. As a result, he became the first person to win the competition both as a player and a coach, which was later matched by Giovanni Trapattoni, Johan Cruyff, Carlo Ancelotti, Frank Rijkaard, Pep Guardiola and Zinedine Zidane; he left in 1974 after 16 seasons, as the side's longest-serving and most successful coach, before being surpassed by Carlo Ancelotti in the number of titles in 2024.

After seven more club seasons (Granada, Las Palmas and Sevilla), Muñoz took the reins of the Spain national team after their group stage exit in the 1982 FIFA World Cup, on home soil. Previously, he had had a four-game interim spell in the late 60s, and eventually led the country to the UEFA Euro 1984 runner-up place, as well as the quarter-finals of the 1986 FIFA World Cup.

== Death ==
Muñoz died in Madrid aged 68, from bleeding due to esophageal varices.

== Managerial statistics ==
Managerial record by team and tenure
Team	From	To	Record							
Team	From	To	G	W	D	L	GF	GA	GD	Win %
Real Madrid	21 February 1959	13 April 1959	9	5	2	2	31	9	+22	55.56
Plus Ultra	20 April 1959	10 April 1960	31	13	11	7	61	44	+17	41.94
Real Madrid	13 April 1960	15 January 1974	595	352	126	117	1,194	533	+661	59.16
Spain	15 May 1960	10 December 1961	14	9	2	3	28	16	+12	64.29
Granada	1 July 1975	20 May 1976	38	9	12	17	36	58	−22	23.68
Las Palmas	1 July 1977	1 June 1979	72	27	21	24	103	92	+11	37.50
Sevilla	5 July 1979	6 December 1981	82	32	18	32	100	111	−11	39.02
Spain	27 October 1982	17 June 1988	59	30	15	14	101	57	+44	50.85
Career totals			900	477	207	216	1,654	920	+734	53.00

== Honours ==
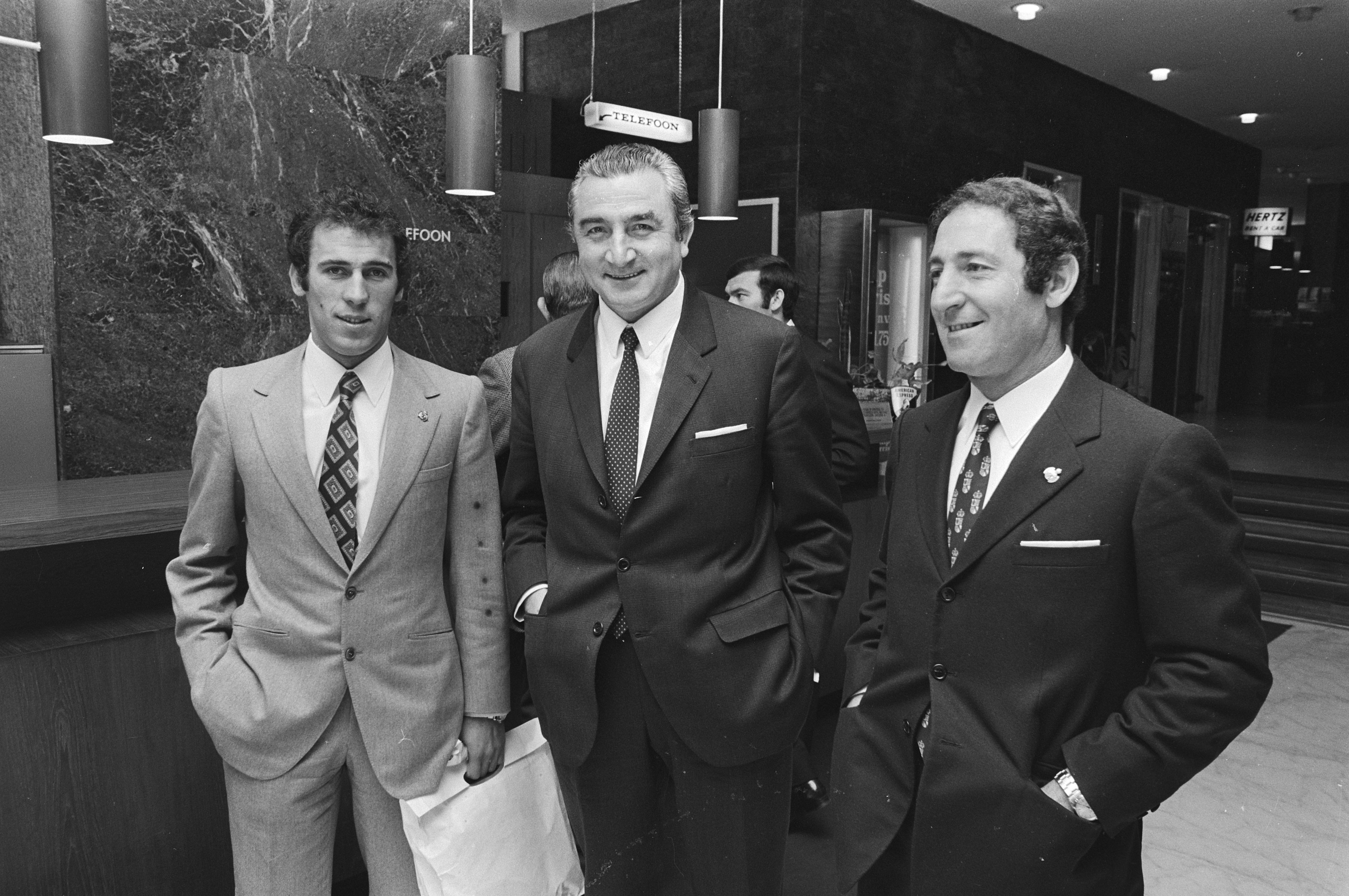
Muñoz (center) with Amancio Amaro (left) and Francisco Gento, 1971

=== Player ===
Real Madrid

- La Liga: 1953–54, 1954–55, 1956–57, 1957–58
- Latin Cup: 1955, 1957
- European Cup: 1955–56, 1956–57, 1957–58

=== Manager ===
Real Madrid

- La Liga: 1960–61, 1961–62, 1962–63, 1963–64, 1964–65, 1966–67, 1967–68, 1968–69, 1971–72
- Copa del Generalísimo: 1961–62, 1969–70
- European Cup: 1959–60, 1965–66
- Intercontinental Cup: 1960

=== Individual ===
- France Football 14th Greatest Manager of All Time: 2019
