= Luis del Sol =

Spanish footballer (1935–2021)

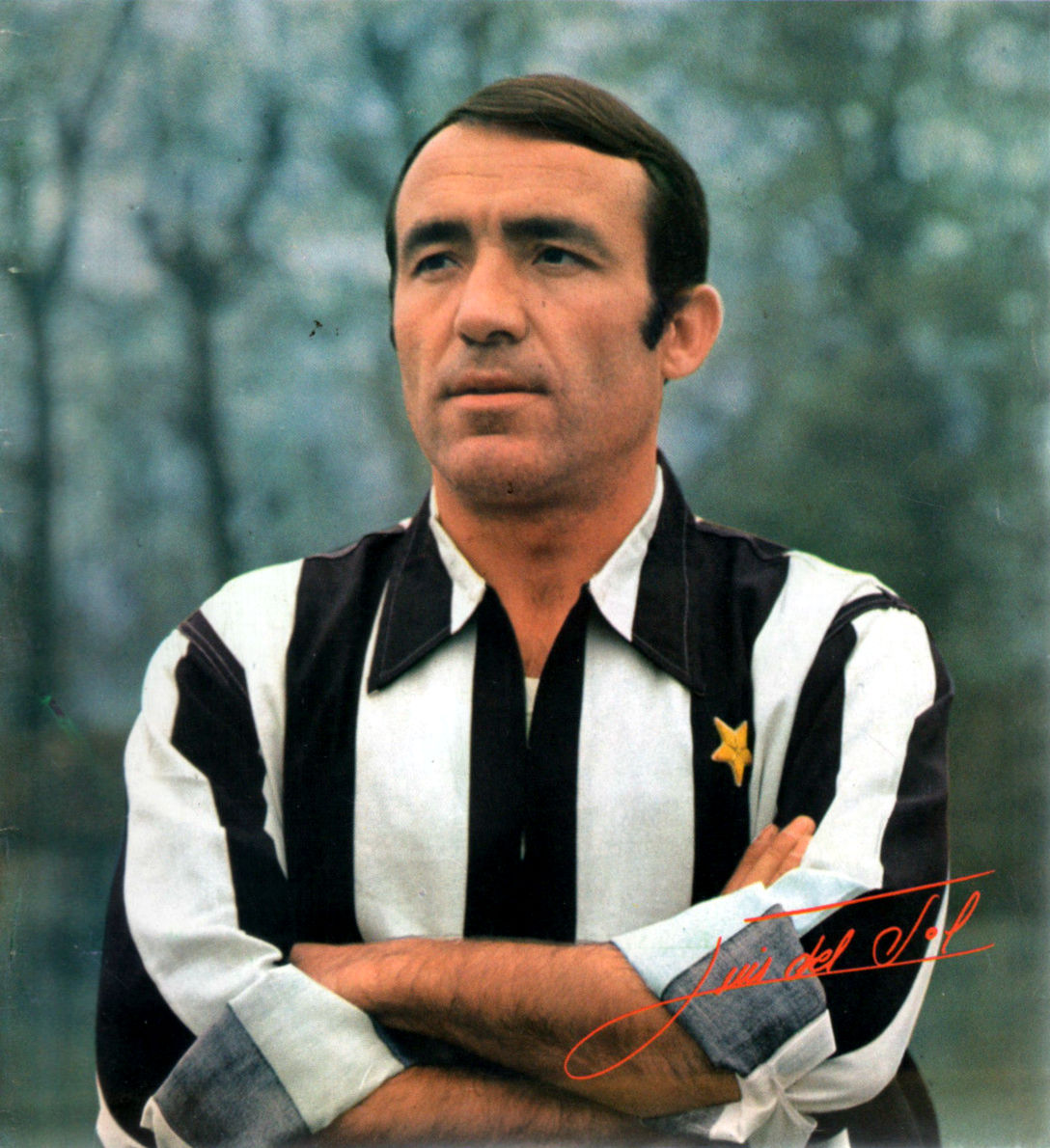
- Del Sol with Juventus in 1969

Personal information
- Full name: Luis del Sol Cascajares
- Date of birth: 6 April 1935
- Place of birth: Arcos de Jalón, Spain
- Date of death: 20 June 2021 (aged 86)
- Place of death: Seville, Spain
- Height: 1.72 m (5 ft 8 in)
- Position: Midfielder

Youth career
- Alegría
- San Gerónimo
- Retiro San Miguel
- Andalucía
- 1951–1953: Betis

Senior career*
Years	Team	Apps	(Gls)
1953–1959	Betis	152	(38)
1953–1954	→ Utrera (loan)		
1960–1962	Real Madrid	55	(22)
1962–1970	Juventus	228	(20)
1970–1972	Roma	50	(4)
1972–1973	Betis	17	(0)
Total		502	(84)

International career
1959	Spain U21	1	(0)
1957–1959	Spain B	3	(0)
1960–1966	Spain	16	(3)

Managerial career
- Carmona
- 1981–1982: Jerez Industrial
- 1982–1983: Betis B
- 1983–1986: Betis (youth)
- 1986: Betis B (interim)
- 1986–1987: Betis
- 1990: Recreativo
- 2001: Betis
Medal record
Men's football
Representing Spain
European Nations' Cup
Winner	1964 Spain
- * Club domestic league appearances and goals

Luis del Sol Cascajares (6 April 1935 – 20 June 2021) was a Spanish football midfielder and manager.

He played a total of 112 La Liga games for Betis and Real Madrid (28 goals scored), winning five major titles with the latter side and earning several Ballon d'Or nominations. He later had brief spells as manager with the former club.

Del Sol represented Spain in two World Cups, in the 1960s.

== Club career ==
=== Betis and Real Madrid ===
Del Sol was born in Arcos de Jalón, Province of Soria, relocating with his family to Andalusia at age two months. In his country, he played for Real Betis and Real Madrid; with the former club he was part of the squad that was promoted to La Liga (1958), appearing in 40 games in that level over the course of one and a half seasons and scoring six goals.

Signing with the Merengues in April 1960 for 6 million pesetas, del Sol netted a career-best 17 times in his first full season, while not missing one single minute of action in his 29 appearances as his team won the national championship, after starting the year with the Intercontinental Cup triumph against Peñarol.

=== Italy ===
In the summer of 1962, aged 27, del Sol moved abroad and signed for Juventus FC, becoming the club's first ever Spanish player and the third Spaniard in the Serie A. He was assigned the number 10 shirt in 1965 following Omar Sívori's departure to SSC Napoli, and appeared in 292 competitive matches during his spell in Turin (228 in Serie A, 26 in the Coppa Italia and 38 in European competitions), scoring 29 goals (20/6/3), winning the domestic cup in 1965 and the league title two years later.

In 1970, del Sol joined AS Roma, collecting 57 appearances and scoring four goals during his two-year stint in the Italian capital and also serving as team captain, just as compatriot Joaquín Peiró had before him. In total, he remained one full decade in Italy.

=== Later career ===
Del Sol returned to Betis for the 1972–73 campaign. After suffering top-flight relegation the 38-year-old decided to retire from football, going on to later coach the club for several spells, starting with its youth sides and being in charge for 13 games as they returned to division one in 2001.

== International career ==
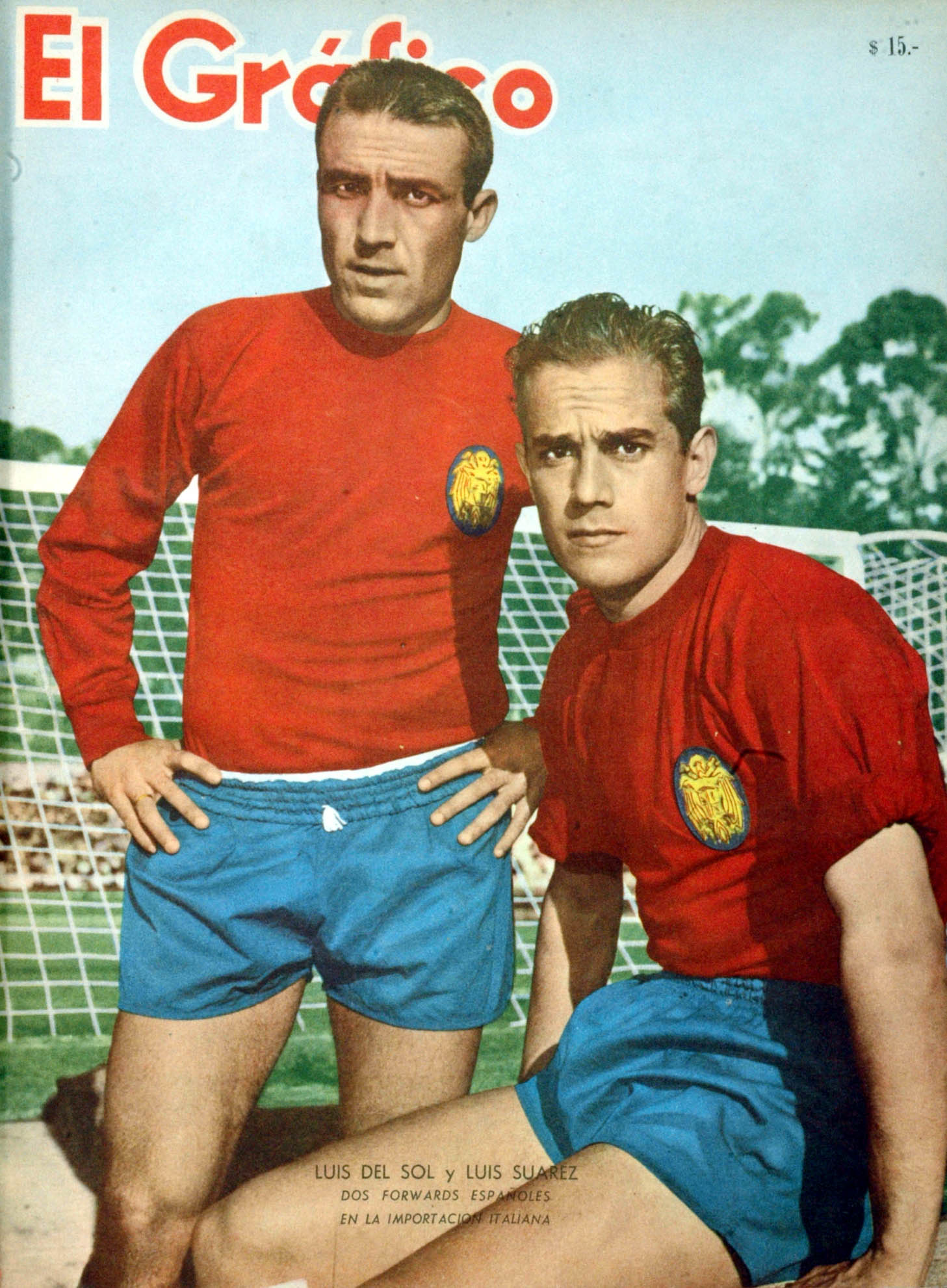
Del Sol and Luis Suárez with Spain in 1962

Del Sol earned 16 caps for the Spain national team, scoring three goals. His debut came on 15 May 1960 at the Santiago Bernabéu Stadium, playing the second half of a 3–0 friendly win against England.

Del Sol represented the country at the 1962 and 1966 FIFA World Cups (playing four matches in total), and was also part of the championship-winning squad at the 1964 European Nations' Cup, although he did not appear in the final stages.

=== International goals ===
Scores and results list Spain's goal tally first, score column indicates score after each del Sol goal.

List of international goals scored by Luis del Sol
No.	Date	Venue	Opponent	Score	Result	Competition
1	26 October 1960	Wembley, London, England	England	1–1	2–4	Friendly
2	11 June 1961	Sánchez Pizjuán, Seville, Spain	Argentina	1–0	2–0	Friendly
3	12 November 1961	Marcel Cerdan, Casablanca, Morocco	Morocco	1–0	1–0	1962 World Cup qualification

== Style of play ==
A complete midfielder, del Sol was considered to be one of the best players in the world in his position during the 1960s. A physically strong, dynamic, intelligent and technically skillful player, he was mainly known for his pace, work-rate, tenacity and stamina, and was also noted for his ability to chase down opponents, break down the opposition's moves and subsequently start attacking plays for his team, courtesy of his movement off the ball and distribution. In addition to his abilities as a footballer, he was also known for his strong character, leadership, temperament and dedication on the pitch.

Because of his ability to cover the pitch, del Sol's Real Madrid teammate Alfredo Di Stéfano gave him the nickname the postman.

== Death ==
Del Sol died on 20 June 2021 in Seville, at the age of 86.

== Honours ==
Betis

- Segunda División: 1957–58

Real Madrid

- La Liga: 1960–61, 1961–62
- Copa del Generalísimo: 1961–62
- European Cup: 1959–60
- Intercontinental Cup: 1960

Juventus

- Serie A: 1966–67
- Coppa Italia: 1964–65

Roma

- Anglo-Italian Cup: 1972

Spain

- European Nations' Cup: 1964
