= 1960–61 La Liga =

30th season of La Liga

Primera División
- Season: 1960–61
- Champions: Real Madrid (7th title)
- Relegated: Valladolid; Granada
- European Cup: Real Madrid
- Cup Winners' Cup: Atlético Madrid
- Inter-Cities Fairs Cup: Barcelona; Valencia; Espanyol
- Matches: 240
- Goals: 755 (3.15 per match)
- Top goalscorer: Ferenc Puskás (28 goals)
- Biggest home win: Real Madrid 8–0 Elche
- Biggest away win: Real Betis 0–5 Real Madrid; Elche 2–7 Zaragoza
- Highest scoring: Barcelona 8–2 Granada

The 1960–61 La Liga was the 30th season since its establishment. The season began on 11 September 1960, and concluded on 30 April 1961.

Real Madrid won their seventh title.

== Team locations ==
Location of teams in the 1960–61 La Liga

Team	Home city	Stadium
Atlético Bilbao	Bilbao	San Mamés
Atlético Madrid	Madrid	Metropolitano
Barcelona	Barcelona	Nou Camp
Elche	Elche	Altabix
Español	Barcelona	Sarriá
Granada	Granada	Los Cármenes
Mallorca	Palma	Lluís Sitjar
Oviedo	Oviedo	Carlos Tartiere
Real Betis	Seville	Heliópolis
Real Madrid	Madrid	Santiago Bernabéu
Real Santander	Santander, Spain	El Sardinero
Real Sociedad	San Sebastián	Atocha
Sevilla	Seville	Ramón Sánchez Pizjuán
Valencia	Valencia	Mestalla
Valladolid	Valladolid	José Zorrilla
Zaragoza	Zaragoza	La Romareda

== League table ==
Pos	Team	Pld	W	D	L	GF	GA	GD	Pts	Qualification or relegation
1	Real Madrid (C)	30	24	4	2	89	25	+64	52	Qualified for the European Cup
2	Atlético Madrid	30	17	6	7	57	35	+22	40	Qualified for the Cup Winners' Cup
3	Zaragoza	30	12	9	9	54	53	+1	33	
4	Barcelona	30	13	6	11	62	47	+15	32	Invited for the Inter-Cities Fairs Cup
5	Valencia	30	11	10	9	46	42	+4	32	Invited for the Inter-Cities Fairs Cup
6	Real Betis	30	11	8	11	42	44	−2	30	
7	Atlético Bilbao	30	12	6	12	42	41	+1	30	
8	Real Sociedad	30	10	10	10	37	46	−9	30	
9	Mallorca	30	12	4	14	38	41	−3	28	
10	Español	30	12	3	15	46	46	0	27	Invited for the Inter-Cities Fairs Cup
11	Sevilla	30	9	9	12	42	46	−4	27	
12	Real Santander	30	11	4	15	42	47	−5	26	
13	Oviedo (O)	30	10	6	14	39	54	−15	26	Qualified for the relegation play-offs
14	Elche (O)	30	9	7	14	48	75	−27	25	Qualified for the relegation play-offs
15	Valladolid (R)	30	11	3	16	39	52	−13	25	Relegated to Segunda División
16	Granada (R)	30	5	7	18	32	61	−29	17	Relegated to Segunda División

Source: BDFútbol
Rules for classification: 1) Points; 2) Head-to-head results; 3) Goal difference; 4) Number of goals scored
(C) Champions; (O) Play-off winners; (R) Relegated

== Results ==
Home \ Away	ATB	ATM	BAR	ELC	ESP	GRA	MLL	OVI	BET	RMA	RSA	RSO	SEV	VAL	VAD	ZAR
Atlético Bilbao	—	2–0	0–2	4–2	2–3	3–0	1–2	3–1	0–0	0–2	3–1	2–2	0–2	4–1	4–1	1–0
Atlético Madrid	3–1	—	2–0	5–0	1–1	4–0	2–1	2–0	2–2	1–0	3–2	3–2	2–0	2–2	4–2	4–0
Barcelona	2–2	2–0	—	3–3	4–1	8–2	4–2	3–5	2–1	3–5	2–0	6–2	2–2	1–1	2–0	0–1
Elche	4–1	2–2	2–1	—	2–0	1–2	2–0	3–1	1–1	3–4	2–0	1–0	2–2	4–1	3–0	2–7
Español	0–1	1–2	1–2	5–2	—	3–1	1–0	4–1	2–1	1–2	2–0	1–1	3–0	3–0	1–2	5–0
Granada	2–0	0–3	1–1	1–1	1–2	—	4–0	1–1	1–2	2–3	5–1	2–0	0–2	2–2	0–1	2–3
Mallorca	0–0	0–1	3–1	3–0	3–0	1–0	—	1–0	1–0	1–1	2–1	0–0	2–2	4–0	3–1	4–0
Oviedo	2–0	0–0	1–0	4–0	2–3	0–0	1–0	—	2–1	0–0	2–1	3–1	2–2	2–2	2–0	3–0
Real Betis	1–3	0–0	1–3	7–1	3–1	2–1	2–0	2–0	—	0–5	0–0	5–1	0–0	0–0	3–1	1–1
Real Madrid	3–1	3–1	3–2	8–0	2–0	5–0	3–0	7–0	4–0	—	4–0	3–1	1–1	2–0	2–1	5–1
Real Santander	0–1	1–1	1–0	5–1	1–0	0–0	5–1	3–0	0–1	1–1	—	2–0	2–0	3–0	3–1	2–1
Real Sociedad	0–0	1–0	3–2	3–2	2–1	1–0	3–1	2–0	0–1	0–4	3–1	—	3–1	1–1	0–0	2–2
Sevilla	3–1	4–2	0–1	2–0	2–0	0–0	0–2	3–2	1–1	0–2	1–2	1–2	—	1–3	4–0	1–1
Valencia	1–0	1–2	0–2	0–0	3–0	3–1	2–1	3–1	4–1	0–1	3–1	0–0	6–0	—	1–0	3–0
Valladolid	1–2	0–2	1–0	2–1	2–0	4–0	2–0	3–0	5–1	3–1	2–0	0–0	0–4	2–2	—	1–2
Zaragoza	0–0	4–1	1–1	1–1	1–1	4–1	2–0	4–1	2–1	2–3	5–3	1–1	2–1	1–1	5–1	—

Source: BDFútbol
Legend: Blue = home team win; Yellow = draw; Red = away team win.

== Relegation play-offs ==
Team 1	Agg.	Team 2	1st leg	2nd leg
Oviedo	3–2	Celta Vigo	1–0	2–2
Atlético Ceuta	1–4	Elche	1–0	0–4

== Pichichi Trophy ==
Rank	Player	Club	Goals
1	(Spain) Ferenc Puskás	Real Madrid	28
2	(Spain) Alfredo Di Stéfano	Real Madrid	21
2	(Paraguay) Juan Romero	Elche	21
4	(Spain) Joaquín Murillo	Zaragoza	20
5	(Spain) Luis del Sol	Real Madrid	17
