= 1957–58 Real Madrid CF season =

55th season in existence of Real Madrid CF

Real Madrid Club de Fútbol
1957–58 season
- President: Santiago Bernabéu
- Head coach: Luis Carniglia
- Stadium: Estadio Chamartín
- Primera Division: 1st (in European Cup)
- Copa del Generalísimo: Runners-up
- European Cup: Winners
- Top goalscorer: Alfredo Di Stéfano (19)
Home colours	Away colours

The 1957–58 season was Real Madrid Club de Fútbol's 55th season in existence and the club's 27th consecutive season in the top flight of Spanish football.

The season saw Real Madrid win the continental double, clinching the European Cup for the third time in a row and successfully defending the La Liga championship. By winning the league, Madrid secured their 6th Primera División title and equalled Barcelona and Athletic Bilbao for most title wins.

The team got agonizingly close to clinching its first ever treble, only to be defeated by Atlético de Bilbao in the Copa del Generalísimo final.

== Summary ==
The club signed 1955–56 French league champion manager Luis Carniglia as its new head coach. New arrivals for the team were goalkeeper Rogelio Domínguez, a champion with Argentina at the 1957 Copa América, and from Nacional de Montevideo Uruguayan defender José Emilio Santamaría, who played at the 1954 FIFA World Cup and brought attention due to his style of play. These two signings were crucial to boost the defense of the team with an impressive 26 goals conceded during 30 matches in the Spanish league, helping also the offensive line wherein Alfredo Di Stéfano and his 19 goals clinched another league top scorer trophy, this time tied with Manuel Badenes (Real Valladolid) and Ricardo Alós (Valencia) .

The team, with an excellent balance in defense and offense, won its sixth Spanish league title, finishing 3 points above Atlético Madrid despite a bad row of results during the winter. Also, the squad clinched its third consecutive European Cup defeating A.C. Milan 3–2 after extra time at Heysel. After clinching the two trophies, Madrid's attention turned to the Copa del Generalísimo with hopes of becoming the first team in the world to clinch the continental treble. Real Sociedad was defeated convincingly to set up the final against Atlético de Bilbao at the Bernabéu. Playing at home in front of 100,000 spectators with the treble on the line, Madrid were shut down by Athletic, losing 0–2. Real Madrid continued its unlucky run of losing Copa finals. As of 2022, the club has never won a treble, with its next closest attempt coming four years later.

== Squad ==
Note: Flags indicate national team as defined under FIFA eligibility rules; some limited exceptions apply. Players may hold more than one non-FIFA nationality.

No.	Pos.	Nation	Player
—	GK	TUN	Yassine Gam (footballer, born 1927)
—	GK	ESP	Berasaluce
—	DF	URU	José Emilio Santamaría
—	DF	ESP	Joaquin Navarro
—	DF	ESP	Rafael Lesmes
—	DF	ESP	José María Zárraga
—	DF	ESP	Ángel Atienza
—	DF	ESP	Rubio

No.	Pos.	Nation	Player
—	MF	ESP	Miguel Muñoz
—	MF	ESP	Juan Santisteban
—	MF	FRA	Raymond Kopa
—	MF	ESP	Ruiz
—	FW	ARG	Alfredo Di Stéfano
—	FW	ESP	Francisco Gento
—	FW	ESP	Ramón Marsal
—	FW	ESP	Enrique Mateos

=== Transfers ===
In
Pos.	Name	From	Type
GK	Rogelio Domínguez	Racing Club	-
DF	José Emilio Santamaría	Nacional	-
FW	Isidro Brunet	Tarrasa	-
MF	Jesus Pereda	Indauchu	-
FW	Carlos Cela	Real Betis	-

Out
Pos.	Name	To	Type
DF	Joaquin Oliva	Jaen	-
-
MF	Roque Olsen	Cordoba	-
DF	Pedro Casado	Plus Ultra	-
DF	Joaquin Navarro	Trah	-
DF	Carlos Sutter	Plus Ultra	-
GK	Juan Visa	Plus Ultra	-
MF	Wilson Jones	Zaragoza	-
MF	Julio Roth	Tenerife	-
MF	Manolin	Zaragoza	-
DF	Manuel Torres	Zaragoza	-
DF	Arturo Seoane	Celta	-
MF	Montejano	Plus Ultra	-
FW	Perez Paya		-
MF	Luis Molowny	Las Palmas	-
FW	Marcelino Lera	Osasuna	-
DF	Luis Cela	Plus Ultra	-
FW	Heliodoro Castaño	Real Betis	-

== Competitions ==
=== La Liga ===
==== League table ====
Pos	Team	Pld	W	D	L	GF	GA	GD	Pts	Qualification or relegation
1	Real Madrid (C)	30	20	5	5	71	26	+45	45	Qualification for the European Cup first round
2	Atlético Madrid	30	16	10	4	78	43	+35	42	Qualification for the European Cup preliminary round (Note: Atlético Madrid qualified for the European Cup as Real Madrid qualified as title holders.)
3	Barcelona	30	17	4	9	69	38	+31	38	Invited for the Inter-Cities Fairs Cup
4	Valencia	30	13	10	7	56	40	+16	36	
5	Osasuna	30	15	5	10	53	43	+10	35	

Source: BDFútbol
Rules for classification: 1) Points; 2) Head-to-head results; 3) Goal difference; 4) Number of goals scored
(C) Champions

==== Position by round ====
Round	1	2	3	4	5	6	7	8	9	10	11	12	13	14	15	16	17	18	19	20	21	22	23	24	25	26	27	28	29	30
Ground	H	A	H	A	H	A	A	H	A	H	A	H	A	H	A	A	H	A	H	A	H	H	A	H	A	H	A	H	A	H
Result	W	W	W	D	W	W	D	W	L	W	W	W	L	D	L	L	W	L	W	W	W	W	D	W	W	W	W	W	D	W
Position	2	1	1	2	1	1	1	1	1	1	1	1	1	1	3	3	3	3	3	2	1	2	2	1	1	1	1	1	1	1

Source: www.lfp.es
A = Away; H = Home; W = Win; D = Draw; L = Loss; = Leader, 1958-59 European Cup

==== Matches ====
15 September 1957 1	Real Madrid	3–0	Osasuna	Madrid
	Mateos 26'; Kopa 64'; Rial 85'	Report		Stadium: Chamartín; Referee: García Fernandez

15 September 1957 2	Granada CF	0–2	Real Madrid	Granada
		Report	Rial 58'; Rial 71'	Stadium: Los Cármenes; Referee: Ortiz de Mendibil

29 September 1957 3	Real Madrid	6–0	Sevilla CF	Madrid
	Di Stéfano 18' (pen.); Di Stéfano 25'; Di Stéfano 39'; Marsal 44'; Marsal 62'; Kopa 72'	Report		Stadium: Chamartín; Referee: Gardeazabal Garay

6 October 1957 4	Valencia CF	2–2	Real Madrid	Valencia
	Seguí 8'; Walter 76'	Report	Rial 71'; Di Stéfano 85'	Referee: Blanco Perez

13 October 1957 5	Real Madrid	3–0	CF Barcelona	Madrid
	Kopa 10'; Rial 43'; Di Stéfano 73'	Report		Stadium: Chamartín; Referee: Rey Martinez

20 October 1957 6	Real Jaén	0–2	Real Madrid	Jaén
	Mandi39'	Report	Kopa 87'; Zárraga 88'	Stadium: La Victoria

27 October 1957 7	UD Las Palmas	0–0	Real Madrid	Las Palmas
		Report		Stadium: Estadio Insular; Referee: García Fernandez

3 November 1957 8	Real Madrid	2–1	Real Sociedad	Madrid
	Rial 36'; Di Stéfano 73' (pen.)	Report	Lacalle 66'	Stadium: Chamartín; Referee: Gomez Arribas

10 November 1957 9	Real Gijón	3–0	Real Madrid	Gijón
	Biempica 23'; Sánchez 50' (pen.), 86'	Report		Stadium: Estadio El Molinón; Referee: Azon Roma

17 November 1957 10	Real Madrid	6–0	Athletic Bilbao	Madrid
	Kopa 8'; Marsal 20'; Di Stéfano 25'; Rial 59'; Marsal 86'; Rial 88'	Report		Stadium: Chamartín; Referee: Gonzalez Echeverria

1 December 1957 11	Real Valladolid	0–1	Real Madrid	Valladolid
		Report	Di Stéfano 49'	Referee: Gardeazabal Garay

8 December 1957 12	Real Madrid	2–0	Español	Madrid
	Mateos 14'; Di Stéfano 78'	Report		Stadium: Chamartín; Referee: Ortiz de Mendibil

15 December 1957 13	Celta de Vigo	2–1	Real Madrid	Vigo
	Moll 27' (pen.); Vigo 38'	Report	Rial 13'	Referee: Contreras

22 December 1957 14	Real Madrid	0–0	Atlético Madrid	Madrid
		Report		Stadium: Chamartín; Referee: Gardeazabal Garay

29 December 1957 15	Real Zaragoza	3–1	Real Madrid	Zaragoza
	Murillo 18'; Wilson 41', 48'	Report	Gento 22'	Stadium: La Romareda; Referee: Birigay Nieva

5 January 1958 16	Osasuna	1–0	Real Madrid	Pamplona
	Marañón 47'	Report		Stadium: San Juan; Referee: Gonzalez Echeverria

12 January 1958 17	Real Madrid	4–0	Granada CF	Madrid
	Gento 8'; Joseíto 15'; Gento 79'; Joseíto 81'	Report		Stadium: Chamartín; Referee: Blanco Perez

19 January 1958 18	Sevilla CF	3–2	Real Madrid	Sevilla
	Pepillo 33'; Loren 37'; Arza 75' (pen.)	Report	Joseíto 46'; Di Stéfano 89' (pen.)	Referee: Gardeazabal Garay

26 January 1958 19	Real Madrid	2–1	Valencia CF	Madrid
	Marsal 65'; Di Stéfano 67'; Juan Alonso 35'	Report	Fuertes 24'	Stadium: Chamartín

2 February 1958 20	CF Barcelona	0–2	Real Madrid	Barcelona
		Report	Marsal 34'; Rial 37'	Stadium: Estadio del CF Barcelona

9 February 1958 21	Real Madrid	3–0	Real Jaén	Madrid
	Rial 7'; Gento 37'; Rial 89'	Report		Stadium: Chamartín; Referee: Birigay Nieva

16 February 1958 22	Real Madrid	2–1	UD Las Palmas	Madrid
	Gento 46'; Gento 50'	Report	Larraz 36'	Stadium: Chamartín; Referee: Gomez Contreras

2 March 1958 23	Real Sociedad	2–2	Real Madrid	San Sebastián
	Paz 10'; Gordejuela 37' (pen.)	Report	Rial 70'; Kopa 77'	Stadium: Atocha; Referee: Gardeazabal Garay

9 March 1958 24	Real Madrid	4–0	Real Gijón	Madrid
	Di Stéfano 12'; Di Stéfano 57'; Marsal 65'; Kopa 84'	Report		Stadium: Chamartín; Referee: Gomez Arribas

23 March 1958 25	Atletico de Bilbao	0–2	Real Madrid	Bilbao
		Report	Rial 19'; Marsal 26'	Referee: Gonzalez Echeverria

29 March 1958 26	Real Madrid	5–3	Real Valladolid	Madrid
	Di Stéfano 9'; Di Stéfano 17'; Mateos 21'; Di Stéfano 30'; Gento 89'	Report	Badenes 22'; Badenes 57'; Badenes 67'	Stadium: Chamartín; Referee: Lacambra Canela

6 April 1958 27	Español	2–4	Real Madrid	Barcelona
	Ruiz 24'; Sastre 36' (pen.)	Report	Marsal 15'; Marsal 35'; Marsal 67'; Kopa 81'	Stadium: Estadio Sarria; Referee: Gardeazabal Garay

20 April 1958 28	Real Madrid	5–0	Celta Vigo	Madrid
	Di Stéfano 6' (pen.); Marsal 34'; Di Stéfano 55' (pen.); Di Stéfano 79' (pen.); Rial 83'	Report		Stadium: Chamartín; Referee: Birigay Nieva

27 April 1958 29	Atlético Madrid	1–1	Real Madrid	Madrid
	Hollaus 38'	Report	Rial 76'	Stadium: Metropolitano; Referee: Rey Martinez

4 May 1958 30	Real Madrid	2–1	Real Zaragoza	Madrid
	Pereda 77'; Rial 78'	Report	Murillo 25'	Stadium: Chamartín; Referee: Blanco Perez

=== Copa del Rey ===
==== Round of 16 ====
18 May 1958 First leg	Real Madrid	4–0	Club Atlético de Madrid	Madrid
				Stadium: Estadio Chamartín

25 May 1958 Second leg	Club Atlético de Madrid	0–1 (0–5 agg.)	Real Madrid	Madrid
				Stadium: Estadio Metropolitano de Madrid

==== Quarter-finals ====
1 June 1958 First leg	Real Madrid	5–1	Real Valladolid Deportivo	Madrid
				Stadium: Estadio Chamartín

8 June 1958 Second leg	Real Valladolid Deportivo	0–2 (1–7 agg.)	Real Madrid	Valladolid
				Stadium: Estadio José Zorrilla

==== Semi-finals ====
15 June 1958 First leg	Real Madrid	4–1	Real Sociedad de Fútbol	Madrid
				Stadium: Estadio Chamartín

22 June 1958 Second leg	Real Sociedad de Fútbol	1–1 (2–5 agg.)	Real Madrid	San Sebastián
				Stadium: Atotxa Stadium

==== Final ====
29 June 1958 Final	Atlético de Bilbao	2–0	Real Madrid	Madrid
18:15 CET	Arieta 20'; Mauri 23'	Report (in Spanish)		Stadium: Estadio Chamartín; Attendance: 100,000; Referee: José Luis González Echeverría

=== European Cup ===
==== First round ====
31 October 1957 First leg	Royal Antwerp (Belgium)	1–2	(Spain) Real Madrid	Antwerp, Belgium
	De Backer 58'	Report	Di Stéfano 15', 61'	Stadium: Stade Bosuil, Antwerp; Attendance: 45,000; Referee: Dean Harzic (France)

28 November 1957 Second leg	Real Madrid (Spain)	6–0 (8–1 agg.)	(Belgium) Royal Antwerp	Madrid, Spain
	Rial 2', 4', 41'; Marsal 52'; Kopa 79'; Gento 89'	Report		Stadium: Santiago Bernabéu Stadium; Attendance: 72,245; Referee: Louis Fauquembergue (France)

==== Quarter-finals ====
23 January 1958 First leg	Real Madrid (Spain)	8–0	(Spain) Sevilla	Madrid, Spain
	Di Stéfano 10', 54' (pen.), 85', 88'; Kopa 37', 73'; Marsal 48'; Gento 81'	Report		Stadium: Santiago Bernabéu Stadium; Attendance: 76,796; Referee: Lucien Van Nuffel (Belgium)

23 February 1958 Second leg	Sevilla (Spain)	2–2 (10–2 agg.)	(Spain) Real Madrid	Seville, Spain
	Payá 22'; Pahuet 29'	Report	Pereda 48', 62'	Stadium: Estadio Nervión; Attendance: 25,000; Referee: Albert Alsteen (Belgium)

==== Semi-finals ====
2 April 1958 First leg	Real Madrid (Spain)	4–0	(Hungary) Vasas	Madrid, Spain
	Di Stéfano 9', 42', 50' (pen.); Marsal 46'	Report		Stadium: Santiago Bernabéu Stadium; Attendance: 120,000; Referee: Maurice Guigue (France)

16 April 1958 Second leg	Vasas (Hungary)	2–0 (2–4 agg.)	(Spain) Real Madrid	Budapest, Hungary
	Bundzsák 25'; Csordás 53' (pen.)	Report		Stadium: Népstadion; Attendance: 100,000; Referee: Pierre Schwinte (France)

==== Final ====
28 May 1958	Real Madrid (Francoist Spain)	3–2 (a.e.t.)	(Italy) Milan	Brussels
20:45 (21:45 UTC+3)	Di Stéfano 74'; Rial 79'; Gento 107'	Report	Schiaffino 59'; Grillo 77'	Stadium: Heysel Stadium; Attendance: 67,000; Referee: (Belgium) Albert Alsteen

== Statistics ==
=== Squad statistics ===
Competition	First match	Last match	Starting round	Final position	Record							
Competition	First match	Last match	Starting round	Final position	Pld	W	D	L	GF	GA	GD	Win %
La Liga	15 September 1957	4 May 1958	Matchday 1	Winners	30	20	5	5	71	26	+45	66.67
Copa del Generalísimo	18 May 1958	29 June 1958	Round of 16	Runners-up	7	5	1	1	17	5	+12	71.43
European Cup	31 October 1957	28 May 1958	First round	Winners	0	0	0	0	0	0	+0	—
Total					37	25	6	6	88	31	+57	67.57

Last updated: 22 September 2019
Source: Competitions

=== Players statistics ===
No.	Pos	Nat	Player	Total		Primera Division		European Cup		Copa	
No.	Pos	Nat	Player	Apps	Goals	Apps	Goals	Apps	Goals	Apps	Goals
	GK	(Argentina) ARG	Dominguez	20	-13	16	-10	3	-3	1	0
	DF	(Spain) ESP	Atienza	32	0	21	0	4	0	7	0
	DF	(Uruguay) URU	Santamaria	41	0	27	0	7	0	7	0
	DF	(Spain) ESP	Lesmes	32	0	21	0	6	0	5	0
	MF	(Spain) ESP	Zárraga	41	1	28	1	7	0	6	0
	MF	(Spain) ESP	Santisteban	38	0	26	0	5	0	7	0
	FW	(France) FRA	Kopa	34	11	27	8	7	3	0	0
	FW	(Spain) ESP	Marsal	25	15	20	12	5	3	0	0
	FW	(Argentina) ARG	Rial	39	22	27	17	6	4	6	1
	FW	(Argentina) ARG	Di Stefano	44	36	30	19	7	10	7	7
	FW	(Spain) ESP	Gento	39	11	28	7	6	3	5	1
	GK	(Spain) ESP	Alonso	25	-23	15	-14	4	-4	6	-5
	FW	(Spain) ESP	Brunet	2	0	2	0	0	0	0	0
	MF	(Spain) ESP	Pereda	6	3	2	1	1	2	3	0
	MF	(Spain) ESP	Muñoz	6	0	4	0	2	0	0	0
	FW	(Spain) ESP	Joseíto	14	7	5	3	2	0	7	4
	MF	(Spain) ESP	Becerril	2	0	1	0	1	0	0	0
	GK	(Spain) ESP	Berasaluce	1	-2	1	-2	0	0	0	0
	DF	(Spain) ESP	Marquitos	20	0	15	0	3	0	2	0
	DF	(Spain) ESP	Rubio	4	0	4	0	0	0	0	0
	MF	(Spain) ESP	Ruiz	5	0	4	0	0	0	1	0
	FW	(Spain) ESP	Mateos	16	7	8	3	1	0	7	4

- Source: http://www.bdfutbol.com/en/t/t1957-582.html
