= 1957–58 AC Milan season =

Milan Associazione Calcio
1957–58 season
- President: Andrea Rizzoli
- Manager: Giuseppe Viani, then Luigi Bonizzoni
- Stadium: San Siro
- Serie A: 9th
- Coppa Italia: Quarter-finals
- European Cup: Runner up
- Top goalscorer: League: Carlo Galli (12); All: Carlo Galli (20)
- Average home league attendance: 24,549
Home colours	Away colours

During the 1957–58 season Associazione Calcio Milan competed in Serie A, Coppa Italia and European Cup.

== Summary ==
For this season Giuseppe Viani was confirmed as the club's coach. Milan was the protagonist of the 1957 transfer market, signing Ernesto Grillo and Giancarlo Danova. Giovanni Trapattoni, purchased from Cusano Milanino, and Mario Trebbi, who came from the youth team, were added to the first team for the Coppa Italia matches, and would become future pillars of the club.

In the league, reigning champions Milan had a disappointing season, collecting only one win in their first 14 matches, and they finished in ninth place, equal on points with Inter and Udinese, just four points above relegated Atalanta.

In the 1958 Coppa Italia (an event reinstituted by the FIGC after 15 years) Milan qualified for the quarter-finals after winning the group stage ahead of Inter, with whom they played the first ever derby in this competition, won 3–2 by the Devils. The quarter-finals of this competition were played on the 6th of September, and therefore form part of the 1958–1959 season.

The main seasonal satisfactions came from the European Cup, where Milan reached the final. During the campaign, they come across Rapid Wien, which they overcame following a play-off won 4–2, made necessary as the total result at the end of the two legs was 6–6 with Milan winning by 4–1 in San Siro and being defeated 5–2 in Austria. Then it was the turn of Rangers, Borussia Dortmund and Manchester United who were eliminated respectively in the round of 16, quarter-finals and semi-finals with overall scores of 6–1, 5–2 and 5–2. Worth mentioning is the win against the Red Devils in the second leg of the semifinals, with the score of 4–0. In the final, the team faced the reigning champions Real Madrid. Like Stade Reims and Fiorentina, finalists against Los Blancos in the two previous editions, Milan is also forced to surrender to the Spanish team, even if they only did so in extra time after taking the lead twice during the first 90 minutes, thanks to goals by Schiaffino and Grillo. The result after 120 minutes was 3–2 with Madrid player Gento scoring the decisive goal in the extra time.

== Squad ==
Note: Flags indicate national team as defined under FIFA eligibility rules; some limited exceptions apply. Players may hold more than one non-FIFA nationality.

Pos.	Nation	Player
GK	ITA	Luciano Alfieri
GK	ITA	Lorenzo Buffon (Vice-captain)
GK	ITA	Narciso Soldan
GK	ITA	Bruno Ducati
DF	ITA	Cesare Maldini
DF	ITA	Mario Bergamaschi
DF	ITA	Eros Fassetta
DF	ITA	Sandro Salvadore
DF	ITA	Giovanni Trapattoni
DF	ITA	Luigi Radice
DF	ITA	Mario Trebbi
DF	ITA	Francesco Zagatti
MF	ITA	Giancarlo Bacci
MF	ITA	Giancarlo Beltrami
MF	SWE	Nils Liedholm (Captain)
MF	ITA	Alfio Fontana

Pos.	Nation	Player
MF	ARG	Ernesto Grillo
MF	ITA	Giancarlo Beltrami
MF	ITA	Eros Beraldo
MF	ITA	Cesare Reina
MF	URU	Juan Alberto Schiaffino
MF	NOR	Per Bredesen
MF	ITA	Amos Mariani
MF	ITA	Giancarlo Migliavacca
MF	ITA	Luigi Zannier
FW	ITA	Dario Baruffi
FW	ITA	Gastone Bean
FW	ITA	Giancarlo Danova
FW	ITA	Carlo Galli
FW	ARG	Ernesto Cucchiaroni
FW	ITA	Pietro Testa

=== Transfers ===
In
Pos.	Name	from	Type
GK	Luciano Alfieri	Siracusa	–
FW	Giancarlo Bacci	Torino	–
FW	Giancarlo Danova	Spezia	–
GK	Bruno Ducati	Parma	–
DF	Eros Fassetta	Monza	–
MF	Ernesto Grillo	Independiente	–
MF	Giancarlo Migliavacca	Piacenza	–
MF	Giovanni Trapattoni	Cusano Milanino	–

Out
Pos.	Name	To	Type
MF	Osvaldo Bagnoli	Verona	–
FW	Emiliano Farina	Cagliari	–
FW	Walter Gómez	Palermo	–
FW	Gianni Meanti	Cagliari	–

== Competitions ==
=== Serie A ===
==== League table ====
Pos	Team	Pld	W	D	L	GF	GA	GD	Pts
7	Vicenza	34	13	7	14	51	48	+3	33
7	Torino	34	11	11	12	42	49	−7	33
9	Milan	34	9	14	11	61	47	+14	32
9	Udinese	34	10	12	12	51	46	+5	32
9	Internazionale	34	10	12	12	36	36	0	32

Source: Panini

==== Matches ====
8 September 1957 1	Lanerossi Vicenza	1–1	Milan	Vicenza
	David 29'		63' Grillo	Stadium: Stadio Romeo Menti; Attendance: 18,000; Referee: Bonetto

15 September 1957 2	Milan	2–2	Napoli	Milan
	Bean 27', 76'		42' Brugola; 59' (o.g.) Maldini	Stadium: Stadio San Siro; Attendance: 50,000; Referee: Rigato

22 September 1957 3	Alessandria	0–0	Milan	Alessandria
				Stadium: Stadio Giuseppe Moccagatta; Attendance: 25,000; Referee: Lo Bello

29 September 1957 4	Milan	0–1	Sampdoria	Milan
			13' Recagno	Stadium: Stadio San Siro; Attendance: 40,000; Referee: Menchini

6 October 1957 5	Inter Milan	1–0	Milan	Milan
	Vincenzi 54' (pen.)			Stadium: Stadio San Siro; Attendance: 85,000; Referee: Lo Bello

13 October 1957 6	Udinese	1–1	Milan	Udine
	Tonini 43'		69' Mariani	Stadium: Stadio Moretti; Attendance: 15,000; Referee: Grill

20 October 1957 7	Milan	1–1	Juventus	Milan
	Bean 59'		34' Sivori	Stadium: Stadio San Siro; Attendance: 60,000; Referee: Lequesne

27 October 1957 8	Milan	5–0	Atalanta	Milan
	Cucchiaroni 30'; Bean 48', 57', 81'; Mariani 73'			Stadium: Stadio San Siro; Attendance: 33,000; Referee: Maurelli

3 November 1957 9	Torino	3–2	Milan	Turin
	Zannier 33' (o.g.); Ricagni 37'; Bacci 53'		43' Bean; 54' Zannier	Stadium: Stadio Filadelfia; Attendance: 30,000; Referee: Pieri

10 November 1958 10	Milan	1–1	Padova	Milan
	Schiaffino 89'		65' Hamrin	Stadium: Stadio San Siro; Attendance: 15,000; Referee: Bonetto

17 November 1957 11	Lazio	1–1	Milan	Roma
	Tozzi 10'		42' Bean	Stadium: Stadio dei Centomila; Attendance: 40,000; Referee: Groppi

24 November 1957 12	Milan	0–1	Bologna	Milan
			48' Pivatelli	Stadium: Stadio San Siro; Attendance: 30,000; Referee: Liverani

15 December 1957 13	Milan	1–1	Roma	Milan
	Galli 7'		87' Da Costa	Stadium: Stadio San Siro; Attendance: 30,000; Referee: Seipelt

22 December 1957 14	Hellas Verona	4–3	Milan	Verona
	Del Vecchio 37', 71'; Basiliani 48'; Gundersen 83'		6' Galli; 23' Bean; 89' (pen.) Liedholm	Stadium: Stadio Marcantonio Bentegodi; Attendance: 22,000; Referee: Liverani

29 December 1957 15	Milan	2–1	Fiorentina	Milan
	Bean 52'; Liedholm 63' (pen.)		22' Virgili	Stadium: Stadio San Siro; Attendance: 25,000; Referee: Maurelli

5 January 1958 16	SPAL	1–5	Milan	Ferrara
	Campanini 36'		20' (pen.) Liedholm; 44' Schiaffino; 69' Grillo; 85' Fontana; 88' Cucchiaroni	Stadium: Stadio Comunale; Attendance: 12,000; Referee: Moriconi

12 January 1958 17	Genoa	1–1	Milan	Genova
	Frignani 33'		47' Grillo	Stadium: Stadio Luigi Ferraris; Attendance: 35,000; Referee: Jonni

26 January 1958 18	Milan	4–1	Lanerossi Vicenza	Milan
	Galli 39', 54'; Mariani 42'; Grillo 88'		51' Savoini	Stadium: Stadio San Siro; Attendance: 20,000; Referee: Ubezio

2 February 1958 19	Napoli	1–0	Milan	Napoli
	Bruno Pesaola 6'			Stadium: Stadio del Vomero; Attendance: 40,000; Referee: Rigato

9 February 1958 20	Milan	1–1	Alessandria	Milan
	Galli 64'		83' Savioni	Stadium: Stadio San Siro; Attendance: 10,000; Referee: Gambarotta

16 February 1958 21	Sampdoria	0–2	Milan	Genova
			68', 71' Danova	Stadium: Stadio Luigi Ferraris; Attendance: 15,000; Referee: Bonetto

23 February 1958 22	Milan	2–2	Inter Milan	Milan
	Galli 37'; Mariani 52'		26' Lorenzi; 58' Masiero	Stadium: Stadio San Siro; Attendance: 70,000; Referee: Jonni

2 March 1958 23	Milan	1–1	Udinese	Milan
	Galli 52'		22' Bettini	Stadium: Stadio San Siro; Attendance: 19,000; Referee: Ubezio

9 March 1958 24	Juventus	1–0	Milan	Turin
	Charles 52'			Stadium: Stadio Comunale; Attendance: 40,000; Referee: Moriconi

16 March 1958 25	Atalanta	1–0	Milan	Bergamo
	Conti 53'			Stadium: Stadio Comunale; Attendance: 14,000; Referee: Bonetto

30 March 1958 26	Milan	4–0	Torino	Milan
	Cucchiaroni 18'; Liedholm 61'; Danova 79'; Brancaleoni 84' (o.g.)			Stadium: Stadio San Siro; Attendance: 40,000; Referee: Steiner

6 April 1958 27	Padova	3–2	Milan	Padova
	Brighenti 17', 18'; Moro 75' (pen.)		55' Grillo; 90' Mariani	Stadium: Stadio Silvio Appiani; Attendance: 10,000; Referee: Maurelli

13 April 1958 28	Milan	6–1	Lazio	Milan
	Galli 5', 18', 39', 48', 50' (pen.); Mariani 49'		76' Muccinelli	Stadium: Stadio San Siro; Attendance: 5,000; Referee: Bonetto

20 April 1958 29	Bologna	0–0	Milan	Bologna
				Stadium: Stadio Comunale; Attendance: 20,000; Referee: Jonni

27 April 1958 30	Roma	3–3	Milan	Roma
	Lojodice 6', 44'; Guarnacci 20'		56' Fontana; 77' Liedholm; 83' Mariani	Stadium: Stadio dei Centomila; Attendance: 35,000; Referee: Liverani

4 May 1958 31	Milan	2–0	Hellas Verona	Milan
	Fontana 33'; Cucchiaroni 36'			Stadium: Stadio San Siro; Attendance: 23,000; Referee: Lo Bello

11 May 1958 32	Fiorentina	4–3	Milan	Firenze
	Lojacono 9', 67'; Magnini 38'; Bizzarri 44'		60', 70' Danova; 85' (pen.) Zagatti	Stadium: Stadio Comunale; Attendance: 25,000; Referee: Moriconi

18 May 1958 33	Milan	4–2	SPAL	Milan
	Schiaffino 11'; Liedholm 58' (pen.), 77'; Grillo 88'		62' Sandell; 76' Broccini	Stadium: Stadio San Siro; Attendance: 17,000; Referee: Jonni

25 May 1958 34	Milan	1–5	Genoa	Milan
	Fontana 51' (pen.)		17', 23' Abbadie; 37', 78', 82' Barison	Stadium: Stadio San Siro; Attendance: 20,000; Referee: Angelini

=== Coppa Italia ===
==== Group stage ====
8 June 1958 1	Como	0–5	Milan	Como
			19' Grillo; 24' Schiaffino; 27' Fontana; 29', 55' Danova	Stadium: Stadio Giuseppe Sinigaglia; Attendance: 2,000; Referee: Gambarotta

15 June 1958 2	Milan	3–2	Inter Milan	Milan
	Cucchiaroni 27'; Danova 46'; Grillo 86'		37' Savioni; 58' Tinazzi	Stadium: Stadio San Siro; Attendance: 8,000; Referee: Bonetto

22 June 1958 3	Simmenthal-Monza	1–4	Milan	Monza
	Fraschini 36'		10' Galli; 37' Bredesen; 55' Bacci; 57' Schiaffino	Stadium: Stadio location di Monza; Attendance: 7,000; Referee: Liverani

29 June 1958 4	Milan	4–1	Como	Milan
	Galli 15' (rig), 59', 63'; Bacci 60'		21' Baldini	Stadium: Stadio San Siro; Attendance: 1,500; Referee: Baldassarre

6 July 1958 5	Inter Milan	1–1	Milan	Milan
	Massei 61'		13' Danova	Stadium: Stadio San Siro; Attendance: 8,000; Referee: Angelini

9 July 1958 6	Milan	1–0	Simmenthal-Monza	Milan
	Galli 46'			Stadium: Stadio San Siro; Attendance: 1,000; Referee: Babini

=== European Cup ===
==== Preliminary round ====
2 October 1957 1	Milan (Italy)	4–1	(Austria) Rapid Wien	Milan
	Grillo 1'; Bean 8'; Höltl 74' (o.g.); Mariani 83'		57' Dienst	Stadium: Stadio San Siro; Attendance: 10,000; Referee: Blanco

9 October 1957 2	Rapid Wien (Austria)	5–2	(Italy) Milan	Wien
	Körner 1'; Dienst 31'; Bertalan 57'; Riegler 62'; Hanappi 78'		19' Grillo; 77' Bean	Stadium: Prater Stadion; Attendance: 25,000; Referee: Zariquiegui

30 October 1957 Play-off	Milan (Italy)	4–2	(Austria) Rapid Wien	Zurich
	Bean 8', 83'; Bergamaschi 41'; Schiaffino 55'		37' (pen.) Happel; 72' Bertalan	Stadium: Hardturm; Attendance: 25,000; Referee: Mellet

==== Round of 16 ====
27 November 1957 1	Glasgow Rangers (Scotland)	1–4	(Italy) Milan	Glasgow
	Murray 32'		74', 84' Grillo; 80' Baruffi; 86' Bean	Stadium: Ibrox Park; Attendance: 85,000; Referee: Asensi

11 December 1957 2	Milan (Italy)	2–0	(Scotland) Glasgow Rangers	Milan
	Baruffi 37'; Galli 48'			Stadium: Arena Civica; Attendance: 3,000; Referee: Ortiz de Mendibil

==== Quarterfinals ====
12 February 1958 1	Borussia Dortmund (West Germany)	1–1	(Italy) Milan	Dortmund
	Bergamaschi 90' (pg)		44' Galli	Stadium: Stadion Rote Erde; Attendance: 30,000; Referee: Ellis

26 March 1958 2	Milan (Italy)	4–1	(West Germany) Borussia Dortmund	Milan
	Cucchiaroni 11'; Liedholm 21'; Galli 63'; Grillo 86'		37' Preißler	Stadium: San Siro; Attendance: 25,000; Referee: Ellis

==== Semifinals ====
8 May 1958 1	Manchester United (England)	2–1	(Italy) Milan	Manchester
	Viollet 39'; Taylor 80' (pen.)		24' Schiaffino	Stadium: Old Trafford; Attendance: 44,480; Referee: Helge

14 May 1958 2	Milan (Italy)	4–0	(England) Manchester United	Milan
	Schiaffino 2', 76'; Liedholm 50' (pen.); Danova 68'			Stadium: San Siro; Attendance: 80,000; Referee: Dusch

==== Final ====
29 May 1958	Real Madrid (Spain)	3–2 (a.e.t.)	(Italy) Milan	Bruxelles
	Di Stefano 74'; Rial 79'; Gento 107'		60' Schiaffino; 78' Grillo	Stadium: Heysel Stadion; Attendance: 65,000; Referee: Alsteen

== Statistics ==
=== Squad statistics ===
Competition	Points	Home						Away						Total						GD
Competition	Points	G	W	D	L	Gs	Ga	G	W	D	L	Gs	Ga	G	W	D	L	Gs	Ga	GD
1957–58 Serie A	32	17	7	7	3	37	21	17	2	7	8	24	26	34	9	4	11	61	47	+14
1958 Coppa Italia	–	6	4	0	2	18	9	3	2	1	0	10	2	9	6	1	2	28	11	+17
1957-58 European Cup	–	5	5	0	0	18	4	5	1	1	3	10	12	10	6	1	3	28	16	+12
Total	–	28	16	7	5	73	34	25	5	9	11	44	40	53	21	16	16	117	74	+43

=== Players statistics ===
No.	Pos	Nat	Player	Total		Serie A		Coppa Italia		European Cup	
No.	Pos	Nat	Player	Apps	Goals	Apps	Goals	Apps	Goals	Apps	Goals
	GK	(Italy) ITA	Lorenzo Buffon	33	-47	22	-34	4	-3	7	-10
	DF	(Italy) ITA	Cesare Maldini	41	0	32	0	1	0	8	0
	DF	(Italy) ITA	Mario Bergamaschi	42	1	28	0	5	0	9	1
	DF	(Italy) ITA	Francesco Zagatti	34	1	24	1	5	0	5	0
	MF	(Sweden) SWE	Nils Liedholm	32	9	24	7	0	0	8	2
	MF	(Italy) ITA	Eros Beraldo	35	0	20	0	6	0	9	0
	MF	(Argentina) ARG	Ernesto Grillo	40	14	30	6	2	2	8	6
	MF	(Italy) ITA	Alfio Fontana	44	5	32	4	4	1	8	0
	MF	(Italy) ITA	Luigi Zannier	31	1	19	1	5	0	7	0
	FW	(Italy) ITA	Amos Mariani	36	8	26	7	4	0	6	1
	FW	(Argentina) ARG	Ernesto Cucchiaroni	36	6	27	4	3	1	6	1
	GK	(Italy) ITA	Narciso Soldan	19	-25	11	-12	5	-7	3	-6
	FW	(Italy) ITA	Gastone Bean	23	15	18	10	0	0	5	5
	MF	(Uruguay) URU	Juan Alberto Schiaffino	26	10	17	3	3	2	6	5
	FW	(Italy) ITA	Carlo Galli	21	20	14	12	4	5	3	3
	FW	(Italy) ITA	Giancarlo Danova	15	10	9	5	4	4	2	1
	DF	(Italy) ITA	Luigi Radice	15	0	9	0	4	0	2	0
	FW	(Italy) ITA	Dario Baruffi	9	2	5	0	0	0	4	2
	MF	(Italy) ITA	Giancarlo Migliavacca	4	0	3	0	1	0	0	0
	DF	(Italy) ITA	Eros Fassetta	1	0	1	0	0	0	0	0
	MF	(Italy) ITA	Giancarlo Beltrami	2	0	1	0	1	0	0	0
	MF	(Italy) ITA	Cesare Reina	3	0	1	0	2	0	0	0
	GK	(Italy) ITA	Bruno Ducati	3	-1	0	0	3	-1	0	0
	GK	(Italy) ITA	Luciano Alfieri	1	-1	1	-1	0	0	0	0
	FW	(Italy) ITA	Pietro Testa	1	0	0	0	1	0	0	0
	MF	(Italy) ITA	Giancarlo Bacci	2	2	0	0	2	2	0	0
	DF	(Italy) ITA	Mario Trebbi	1	0	0	0	1	0	0	0
	MF	(Norway) NOR	Per Bredesen	6	1	0	0	4	1	2	0
	DF	(Italy) ITA	Sandro Salvadore	1	0	0	0	1	0	0	0
	MF	(Italy) ITA	Giovanni Trapattoni	2	0	0	0	2	0	0	0

== See also ==
- AC Milan

== Bibliography ==
- Almanacco illustrato del Milan, ed: 2, March 2005. Panini.
- Enrico Tosi. La storia del Milan, May 2005. Italia/Italy cid Tosi.
- Milan. Sempre con te, December 2009. Mondadori. 2009. ISBN 978-88-04-59118-4.
