= 1958 European Cup final =

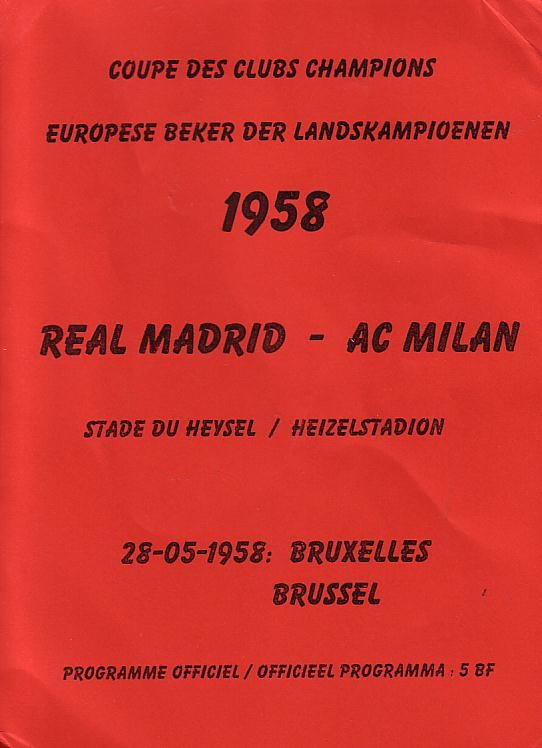
- Match programme cover
- Event: 1957–58 European Cup
Real Madrid	Milan
(Spain)	(Italy)
3	2
- After extra time
- Date: 28 May 1958
- Venue: Heysel Stadium, Brussels
- Referee: Albert Alsteen (Belgium)
- Attendance: 67,000

The 1958 European Cup final was a football match played at the Heysel Stadium in Brussels, Belgium on 28 May 1958 as the conclusion to the 1957–58 European Cup.

The match was contested by two-time defending champions Real Madrid of Spain, the only previous team to win the competition, and AC Milan of Italy.

Despite twice being behind during the match, Real Madrid came from behind to win 3–2 after extra time as they successfully defended their title to lift the trophy for the third consecutive year.

After the match, the Real Madrid players were presented with their winners' medals by King Albert II of Belgium.

== Background ==
Real Madrid had won the first two editions of the European Cup, defeating Stade de Reims 4–3 in the inaugural season in 1956 and Fiorentina 2–0 in 1957.

AC Milan had only played in the European Cup once previously, reaching the semi-finals in the inaugural season where they were defeated 5–4 on aggregate by Real Madrid.

== Route to the final ==
(Spain) Real Madrid				Round	(Italy) Milan			
Opponent	Agg.	1st leg	2nd leg		Opponent	Agg.	1st leg	2nd leg
Bye				Prelim. round	(Austria) Rapid Wien	6–6 (Replay: 4–2)	4–1 (H)	2–5 (A)
(Belgium) Antwerp	8–1	2–1 (A)	6–0 (H)	First round	(Scotland) Rangers	6–1	4–1 (A)	2–0 (H)
(Spain) Sevilla	10–2	8–0 (H)	2–2 (A)	Quarter-finals	(West Germany) Borussia Dortmund	5–2	1–1 (A)	4–1 (H)
(Hungary) Vasas SC	4–2	4–0 (H)	0–2 (A)	Semi-finals	(England) Manchester United	5–2	1–2 (A)	4–0 (H)

=== Real Madrid ===
Real Madrid qualified for the competition as defending champions and they were given a bye in the preliminary round.

In the first round, Real Madrid defeated Royal Antwerp of Belgium 2–1 away in the first leg and 6–0 at home in the second leg to advance 8–1 on aggregate.

Real Madrid then faced Sevilla of Spain in the quarter-finals. Real Madrid won the first leg at home 8–0 before the teams played out a 2–2 draw in the second leg in Seville as Real Madrid advanced 10–2 on aggregate.

In the semi-finals, Real Madrid faced Vasas of Hungary. After winning the first leg 4–0 at home, Real Madrid lost the second leg 2–0 away but advanced to the final 4–2 on aggregate.

=== Milan ===
Milan qualified for the competition as winners of the 1956–57 Serie A.

In the preliminary round, Milan faced Rapid Wien of Austria. After winning the first leg 4–1 at home, Milan lost the second leg 5–2 in Vienna which resulted in a tie, 6–6 on aggregate. As a result, a replay was held at a neutral venue in Zurich, Switzerland which Milan won 4–2 to advance.

Milan then played Rangers of Scotland in the first round. Milan won the first leg 4–1 away and the second leg 2–0 at home to advance 6–1 on aggregate.

Borussia Dortmund of Germany were Milan's opponents in the quarter-finals. After drawing the first leg 1–1 away, Milan won the second leg 4–1 at home to advance 5–2 on aggregate.

In the semi-finals, Milan played Manchester United of England. After losing the first leg 2–1 away, Milan won the second leg 4–0 at home to advance to the final 5–2 on aggregate.

== Match ==
=== Details ===
28 May 1958

Real Madrid (Spain)	3–2 (a.e.t.)	(Italy) Milan
Di Stéfano 74'; Rial 79'; Gento 107'	Report	Schiaffino 59'; Grillo 77'

Heysel Stadium, Brussels
Attendance: 67,000
Referee: Albert Alsteen (Belgium)

Real Madrid	Milan

GK	1	(Spain) Juan Alonso (c)
RB	2	(Spain) Ángel Atienza
LB	3	(Spain) Rafael Lesmes
RH	4	(Spain) Juan Santisteban
CB	5	(Uruguay) José Santamaría (Note: Santamaría, who represented his native Uruguay from 1952 to 1957, later switched to representing Spain internationally. However, his first cap for Spain would not come until October 1958, five months after this match was played.)
LH	6	(Spain) José María Zárraga
IR	7	(Spain) Joseíto
OR	8	(France) Raymond Kopa
CF	9	(Spain) Alfredo Di Stéfano (Note: Di Stéfano, a native Argentine, had represented both Argentina and Colombia earlier in his international career; however, he became a naturalised citizen of Spain in 1956, and began playing for the Spain national team in 1957.)
IL	10	(Spain) Héctor Rial
OL	11	(Spain) Paco Gento
Manager:
(Argentina) Luis Carniglia

GK	1	(Italy) Narciso Soldan
RB	2	(Italy) Alfio Fontana
LB	3	(Italy) Eros Beraldo
RH	4	(Italy) Mario Bergamaschi
CB	5	(Italy) Cesare Maldini
LH	6	(Italy) Luigi Radice
OR	7	(Italy) Giancarlo Danova
IR	8	(Sweden) Nils Liedholm (c)
IL	9	(Italy) Juan Alberto Schiaffino (Note: Though more famous as a Uruguay international, the Uruguayan-born Schiaffino was capped by Italy on four occasions, beginning in 1954 (after the conclusion of that year's World Cup) and lasting until 1958.)
CF	10	(Argentina) Ernesto Grillo
OL	11	(Argentina) Ernesto Cucchiaroni
Manager:
(Italy) Giuseppe Viani

== Aftermath ==
King Albert II presented the winning team with their medals.

== See also ==
- 1957–58 Real Madrid CF season
- 1957–58 AC Milan season
- Real Madrid CF in international football
- AC Milan in international football
