= 1957–58 European Cup =

European football tournament

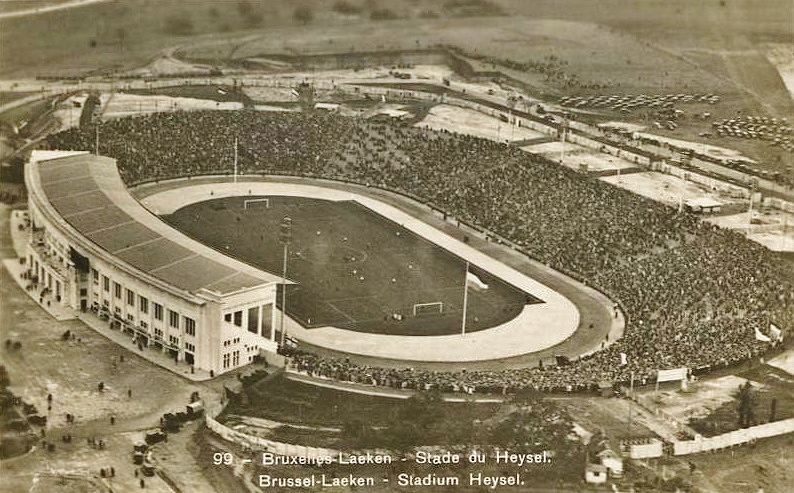
- The Heysel Stadium in Brussels hosted the final.

Tournament details
- Dates: 4 September 1957 – 28 May 1958
- Teams: 24 (from 23 associations)

Final positions
- Champions: (Spain) Real Madrid (3rd title)
- Runners-up: (Italy) Milan

Tournament statistics
- Matches played: 48
- Goals scored: 189 (3.94 per match)
- Attendance: 1,883,587 (39,241 per match)
- Top scorer(s): Alfredo Di Stéfano (Real Madrid); 10 goals

The 1957–58 European Cup was the third season of the European Cup, Europe's premier club football tournament. The competition was won by Real Madrid, who beat Milan 3–2 in the final, in extra time following a 2–2 draw after 90 minutes. This was Real Madrid's third European Cup title in a row. However, the 1957–58 season was marred by the air disaster in Munich, when eight Manchester United players died on their way home from Belgrade, after a 3–3 draw in the quarter-final second leg with Red Star Belgrade. The English champions were ultimately defeated in the semi-finals by the eventual runners-up, Milan of Italy, after being highly touted to win the competition and dominate European football for many years like Real Madrid before them, with the "Busby Babes" having an average age of only 22.

It was the first time that teams from the Republic of Ireland, Northern Ireland and East Germany participated, while Turkey could not send any club, since the Turkish FA failed to register Beşiktaş for the draw in time. Sevilla was invited despite having been runners-up in Spain the year before, as Spanish champions Real Madrid had already qualified as holders; the two Spanish sides met in the quarter-finals, the first time two sides from the same country played against each other in the competition.

== Teams ==
A total of 24 teams participated in the competition.

Ajax, Benfica, CCA București, Dukla Prague, Glenavon, Royal Antwerp, Saint-Étienne, Sevilla, Shamrock Rovers, Stade Dudelange, Vasas, Wismut Karl-Marx-Stadt and Young Boys made their debut appearances in the European Cup while Rapid Wien, AGF and Real Madrid marked their third.

All participants were their respective associations champions, except for Sevilla and Gwardia Warsaw.

(Austria) Rapid Wien (1st)	(Belgium) Royal Antwerp (1st)	(Bulgaria) CDNA Sofia (1st)	(Czechoslovakia) Dukla Prague (1st)
(Denmark) AGF (1st)	(East Germany) Wismut Karl-Marx-Stadt (1st)	(England) Manchester United (1st)	(France) Saint-Étienne (1st)
(Hungary) Vasas (1st)	(Italy) Milan (1st)	(Luxembourg) Stade Dudelange (1st)	(Netherlands) Ajax (1st)
(Northern Ireland) Glenavon (1st)	(Poland) Gwardia Warsaw (2nd)	(Portugal) Benfica (1st)	(Republic of Ireland) Shamrock Rovers (1st)
(Romania) CCA București (1st)	(Scotland) Rangers (1st)	(Spain) Real Madrid (1st)^{TH}	(Spain) Sevilla (2nd)
(Sweden) IFK Norrköping (1st)	(Switzerland) Young Boys (1st)	(West Germany) Borussia Dortmund (1st)	(Socialist Federal Republic of Yugoslavia) Red Star Belgrade (1st)

== Preliminary round ==
The draw for the preliminary round took place at the headquarters of the French Football Federation in Paris on Tuesday, 23 July 1957. As title holders, Real Madrid received a bye, and the remaining 23 teams were grouped geographically into three pots. The first four teams drawn in each pot, and four more teams in pot 1, would play the preliminary round in September, while the remaining clubs received byes.

Location of teams in the 1957–58 European Cup

	Pot 1 Western Europe	Pot 2 Central Europe	Pot 3 Eastern Europe
Drawn	(Republic of Ireland) Shamrock Rovers	(Socialist Federal Republic of Yugoslavia) Red Star Belgrade	(Poland) Gwardia Warsaw
Drawn	(England) Manchester United	(Luxembourg) Stade Dudelange	(East Germany) Wismut Karl-Marx-Stadt
Drawn	(Spain) Sevilla	(Italy) Milan	(Bulgaria) CDNA Sofia
Drawn	(Portugal) Benfica	(Austria) Rapid Wien	(Hungary) Vasas
Drawn	(Denmark) AGF		
Drawn	(Northern Ireland) Glenavon		
Drawn	(Scotland) Rangers		
Drawn	(France) Saint-Étienne		
Byes	(Sweden) IFK Norrköping	(Switzerland) Young Boys	(Romania) CCA București
Byes	(Belgium) Royal Antwerp	(West Germany) Borussia Dortmund	(Czechoslovakia) Dukla Prague
Byes	(Netherlands) Ajax		

The calendar was decided by the involved teams, with all matches to be played by 30 October.

Team 1	Agg.	Team 2	1st leg	2nd leg	Play-off
CDNA Sofia (Bulgaria)	3–7	(Hungary) Vasas	2–1	1–6	
Rangers (Scotland)	4–3	(France) Saint-Étienne	3–1	1–2	
Stade Dudelange (Luxembourg)	1–14	(Socialist Federal Republic of Yugoslavia) Red Star Belgrade	0–5	1–9	
AGF (Denmark)	3–0	(Northern Ireland) Glenavon	0–0	3–0	
Gwardia Warsaw (Poland)	4–4 (ct)	(East Germany) Wismut Karl-Marx-Stadt	3–1	1–3	1–1 (Note: Wismut Karl-Marx-Stadt qualified due to a coin toss, after their play-off against Gwardia Warsaw was abandoned after 100 minutes due to floodlight power failure with the result of 1–1.) (a.e.t.)
Sevilla (Spain)	3–1	(Portugal) Benfica	3–1	0–0	
Shamrock Rovers (Republic of Ireland)	2–9 (Note: To allow an evening kick-off at Dalymount Park in Dublin, which had no floodlights, the teams agreed to change over at half-time without a break. Consequently, the Irish part-timers ran out of steam and Manchester United's 1–0 half-time lead increased to 6–0. The second leg, played under lights at Old Trafford with the normal half-time break, produced a closer scoreline.)	(England) Manchester United	0–6	2–3	
Milan (Italy)	6–6	(Austria) Rapid Wien	4–1	2–5	4–2

=== First leg ===
4 September 1957
20:00 CET

CDNA Sofia (Bulgaria)	2–1	(Hungary) Vasas
Milanov 2', 38'	Report	Bundzsák 53'

Vasil Levski National Stadium, Sofia
Attendance: 50,000
Referee: Erich Steiner (Austria)

4 September 1957
21:15 CET

Rangers (Scotland)	3–1	(France) Saint-Étienne
Kitchenbrand 19'; Scott 47'; Simpson 82'	Report	Mekhloufi 14'

Ibrox Park, Glasgow
Attendance: 85,000
Referee: Leo Helge (Denmark)

5 September 1957
20:00 CET

Stade Dudelange (Luxembourg)	0–5	(Socialist Federal Republic of Yugoslavia) Red Star Belgrade
	Report	Kostić 11', 16'; Rudinski 47', 55'; Mitić 87'

Stade Municipal, Luxembourg
Attendance: 8,000
Referee: Armando Marchetti (Italy)

11 September 1957
21:00 CET

AGF (Denmark)	0–0	(Northern Ireland) Glenavon
	Report

Århus Stadion, Aarhus
Attendance: 14,000
Referee: Willem Beltman (Netherlands)

11 September 1957
21:00 CET

Gwardia Warsaw (Poland)	3–1	(East Germany) Wismut Karl-Marx-Stadt
Baszkiewicz 49'; Lewandowski 59'; Gawroński 88'	Report	S. Kaiser 79'

Stadion Wojska Polskiego, Warsaw
Attendance: 30,000
Referee: Jindřich Karas (Czechoslovakia)

19 September 1957
18:30 CET

Sevilla (Spain)	3–1	(Portugal) Benfica
Pahuet 46'; Antoniet 59'; Pepillo 79'	Report	Palmeiro 48'

Estadio de Nervión, Sevilla
Attendance: 40,000
Referee: Jean-Louis Groppi (France)

25 September 1957
19:45 CET

Shamrock Rovers (Republic of Ireland)	0–6	(England) Manchester United
	Report	T. Taylor 36', 63'; Whelan 51', 57'; Berry 71'; Pegg 72'

Dalymount Park, Dublin
Attendance: 45,000
Referee: Lucien Van Nuffel (Belgium)

2 October 1957
21:30 CET

Milan (Italy)	4–1	(Austria) Rapid Wien
Grillo 4'; Bean 8'; Höltl 74' (o.g.); Mariani 82'	Report	Dienst 58'

San Siro, Milan
Attendance: 15,000
Referee: José Blanco Pérez (Spain)

=== Second leg ===
25 September 1957
21:00 CET

Saint-Étienne (France)	2–1	(Scotland) Rangers
Oleksiak 11'; Ferrier 86'	Report	Wilson 61'

Stade Geoffroy-Guichard, Saint-Étienne
Attendance: 29,517
Referee: Aksel Asmussen (Denmark)

Rangers won 4–3 on aggregate.

25 September 1957
22:00 CET

Glenavon (Northern Ireland)	0–3	(Denmark) AGF
	Report	Kjær Andersen 13', 45'; Jensen 40'

Windsor Park, Belfast
Attendance: 33,000
Referee: Johan Heinrich Martens (Netherlands)

Aarhus won 3–0 on aggregate.

26 September 1957
19:00 CET

Benfica (Portugal)	0–0	(Spain) Sevilla
	Report

Estádio da Luz, Lisbon
Attendance: 50,000
Referee: Pierre Schwinte (France)

Sevilla won 3–1 on aggregate.

2 October 1957
15:15 CET

Red Star Belgrade (Socialist Federal Republic of Yugoslavia)	9–1	(Luxembourg) Stade Dudelange
Cokić 5', 38', 66', 69'; Mitić 10'; Kostić 17', 29', 30', 33'	Report	Rongoni 31'

Stadion Rajko Mitić, Belgrade
Attendance: 1,500
Referee: Cesare Jonni (Italy)

Red Star Belgrade won 14–1 on aggregate.

2 October 1957
20:30 CET

Manchester United (England)	3–2	(Republic of Ireland) Shamrock Rovers
Viollet 5', 60'; Pegg 20'	Report	McCann 55'; Hamilton 66'

Old Trafford, Manchester
Attendance: 33,754
Referee: Albert Alsteen (Belgium)

Manchester United won 9–2 on aggregate.

3 October 1957
20:00 CET

Vasas (Hungary)	6–1	(Bulgaria) CDNA Sofia
Csordás 35', 38', 51'; Berendy 48'; Bundzsák 68'; Szilágyi 89'	Report	Panayotov 25'

Népstadion, Budapest
Attendance: 30,000
Referee: Alfred Grill (Austria)

Vasas won 7–3 on aggregate.

9 October 1957
19:30 CET

Rapid Wien (Austria)	5–2	(Italy) Milan
A. Körner 1'; Dienst 31'; Bertalan 57'; Riegler 62'; Hanappi 78'	Report	Grillo 19'; Bean 77'

Praterstadion, Vienna
Attendance: 25,000
Referee: Daniel Zariquiegui (Spain)

Milan 6–6 Rapid Wien on aggregate; play-off needed.

13 October 1957
20:00 CET

Wismut Karl-Marx-Stadt (East Germany)	3–1	(Poland) Gwardia Warsaw
M. Kaiser 10'; S. Kaiser 55', 74'	Report	Baszkiewicz 60'

Otto Grotewohl stadion, Aue
Attendance: 20,000
Referee: Karol Galba (Czechoslovakia)

Gwardia Warsaw 4–4 Wismut Karl-Marx-Stadt on aggregate; play-off needed.

=== Play-off ===
15 October 1957
20:00 CET

Wismut Karl-Marx-Stadt (East Germany)	1–1 (a.e.t.) Decided by a coin flip.	(Poland) Gwardia Warsaw
Tröger 90'	Report	Z. Szarzyński 3'

Friedrich-Ludwig-Jahn-Sportpark, Berlin
Attendance: 15,000
Referee: Václav Korelus (Czechoslovakia)

Wismut Karl-Marx-Stadt qualified due to a coin toss, after their play-off against Gwardia Warsaw was abandoned with the result of 1–1 after 100 minutes due to floodlight power failure.

30 October 1957
20:15 CET

Milan (Italy)	4–2	(Austria) Rapid Wien
Bean 6', 82'; Bergamaschi 41'; Schiaffino 54'	Report	Happel 38' (pen.); Bertalan 72'

Hardturm, Zürich
Attendance: 26,000
Referee: Daniel Mellet (Switzerland)

Milan won play-off 4–2.

== Bracket ==
First round
(Belgium) Royal Antwerp	1	0	1
(Spain) Real Madrid	2	6	8
(Spain) Sevilla	4	0	4
(Denmark) AGF	0	2	2
(East Germany) Wismut Karl-Marx-Stadt	1	0	1
(Netherlands) Ajax	3	1	4
(Switzerland) Young Boys	1	1	2
(Hungary) Vasas	1	2	3
(England) Manchester United	3	0	3
(Czechoslovakia) Dukla Prague	0	1	1
(Sweden) IFK Norrköping	2	1	3
(Socialist Federal Republic of Yugoslavia) Red Star Belgrade	2	2	4
(West Germany) Borussia Dortmund	4	1	5 (3)
(Romania) CCA București	2	3	5 (1)
(Scotland) Rangers	1	0	1
(Italy) Milan	4	2	6

Quarter-finals
(Spain) Real Madrid	8	2	10
(Spain) Sevilla	0	2	2
(Netherlands) Ajax	2	0	2
(Hungary) Vasas	2	4	6
(England) Manchester United	2	3	5
(Socialist Federal Republic of Yugoslavia) Red Star Belgrade	1	3	4
(West Germany) Borussia Dortmund	1	1	2
(Italy) Milan	1	4	5

Semi-finals
(Spain) Real Madrid	4	0	4
(Hungary) Vasas	0	2	2
(England) Manchester United	2	0	2
(Italy) Milan	1	4	5

Final
(Spain) Real Madrid (a.e.t.)	3
(Italy) Milan	2

== First round ==
Team 1	Agg.	Team 2	1st leg	2nd leg	Play-off
Royal Antwerp (Belgium)	1–8	(Spain) Real Madrid	1–2	0–6	
IFK Norrköping (Sweden)	3–4	(Socialist Federal Republic of Yugoslavia) Red Star Belgrade	2–2	1–2	
Wismut Karl-Marx-Stadt (East Germany)	1–4	(Netherlands) Ajax	1–3	0–1	
Young Boys (Switzerland)	2–3	(Hungary) Vasas	1–1	1–2	
Manchester United (England)	3–1	(Czechoslovakia) Dukla Prague	3–0	0–1	
Sevilla (Spain)	4–2	(Denmark) AGF	4–0	0–2	
Borussia Dortmund (West Germany)	5–5	(Romania) CCA București	4–2	1–3	3–1
Rangers (Scotland)	1–6	(Italy) Milan	1–4	0–2	

=== First leg ===
31 October 1957
15:30 CET

Royal Antwerp (Belgium)	1–2	(Spain) Real Madrid
De Backer 58'	Report	Di Stéfano 15', 61'

Bosuilstadion, Antwerp
Attendance: 45,000
Referee: Dean Harzic (France)

2 November 1957
13:30 CET

IFK Norrköping (Sweden)	2–2	(Socialist Federal Republic of Yugoslavia) Red Star Belgrade
Håkansson 75'; Källgren 85'	Report	Toplak 88'; Kostić 90'

Idrottsparken, Norrköping
Attendance: 10,893
Referee: Józef Kowal (Poland)

20 November 1957
14:00 CET

Wismut Karl-Marx-Stadt (East Germany)	1–3	(Netherlands) Ajax
Müller 87'	Report	Van der Kuil 5', 62'; Bleijenberg 17'

Otto Grotewohl Stadion, Aue
Attendance: 30,000
Referee: Alfred Grill (Austria)

20 November 1957
20:00 CET

Young Boys (Switzerland)	1–1	(Hungary) Vasas
Wechselberger 7'	Report	Csordás 90'

Stade des Charmilles, Genève
Attendance: 20,000
Referee: Giulio Campanati (Italy)

20 November 1957
20:30 CET

Manchester United (England)	3–0	(Czechoslovakia) Dukla Prague
Webster 63'; T. Taylor 65'; Pegg 79'	Report

Old Trafford, Manchester
Attendance: 62,000
Referee: Werner Treichel (West Germany)

27 November 1957
16:00 CET

Sevilla (Spain)	4–0	(Denmark) AGF
Antoniet 6', 30'; Loren 24', 52'	Report

Estadio de Nervión, Sevilla
Attendance: 18,000
Referee: Gaston Grandain (Belgium)

27 November 1957
20:00 CET

Borussia Dortmund (West Germany)	4–2	(Romania) CCA București
Peters 35', 62', 64'; Niepieklo 66'	Report	Zavoda I 43'; Bone 50'

Stadion Rote Erde, Dortmund
Attendance: 42,000
Referee: Jack Mowat (Scotland)

27 November 1957
20:30 CET

Rangers (Scotland)	1–4	(Italy) Milan
Murray 31'	Report	Grillo 75', 83'; Baruffi 81'; Bean 86'

Ibrox Park, Glasgow
Attendance: 85,000
Referee: Manuel Asensi Martín (Spain)

=== Second leg ===
23 November 1957
13:30 CET

Red Star Belgrade (Socialist Federal Republic of Yugoslavia)	2–1	(Sweden) IFK Norrköping
Spajić 75', 88'	Report	Backman 16'

Stadion JNA, Belgrade
Attendance: 20,000
Referee: Włodzimierz Storoniak (Poland)

Red Star Belgrade won 4–3 on aggregate.

27 November 1957
20:00 CET

Ajax (Netherlands)	1–0	(East Germany) Wismut Karl-Marx-Stadt
Ouderland 79'	Report

Olympisch Stadion, Amsterdam
Attendance: 23,000
Referee: Alfred Grill (Austria)

Ajax won 4–1 on aggregate.

28 November 1957
20:15 CET

Real Madrid (Spain)	6–0	(Belgium) Royal Antwerp
Rial 2', 4', 41'; Marsal 52'; Kopa 79'; Gento 89'	Report

Santiago Bernabéu, Madrid
Attendance: 72,245
Referee: Louis Fauquembergue (France)

Real Madrid won 8–1 on aggregate.

30 November 1957
20:00 CET

Vasas (Hungary)	2–1	(Switzerland) Young Boys
Csordás 8', 12'	Report	Schneiter 89'

Népstadion, Budapest
Attendance: 20,000
Referee: Francesco Liverani (Italy)

Vasas won 3–2 on aggregate.

4 December 1957
19:30 CET

AGF (Denmark)	2–0	(Spain) Sevilla
Jensen 41', 86'	Report

Århus Stadion, Aarhus
Attendance: 18,000
Referee: Aloïs Smidts (Belgium)

Sevilla won 4–2 on aggregate.

4 December 1957
20:00 CET

Dukla Prague (Czechoslovakia)	1–0	(England) Manchester United
Dvořák 17'	Report

Strahov, Prague
Attendance: 30,000
Referee: Werner Treichel (West Germany)

Manchester United won 3–1 on aggregate.

8 December 1957
19:00 CET

CCA București (Romania)	3–1	(West Germany) Borussia Dortmund
Tătaru 17'; Constantin 25'; Alecsandrescu 45'	Report	Niepieklo 12'

Stadionul 23 August, Bucharest
Attendance: 60,000
Referee: Janos Posa-polareczky (Hungary)

Borussia Dortmund 5–5 CCA București on aggregate; play-off needed.

11 December 1957
21:00 CET

(Italy) Milan	2–0	Rangers (Scotland)
Baruffi 37'; Galli 48'	Report

Arena Civica, Milan
Attendance: 5,000
Referee: José María Ortiz de Mendíbil (Spain)

Milan won 6–1 on aggregate.

=== Play-off ===
29 December 1957
20:00 CET

Borussia Dortmund (West Germany)	3–1	(Romania) CCA București
Dulz 15'; Kelbassa 62'; Preissler 79'	Report	Cacoveanu 35'

Stadio Comunale, Bologna
Attendance: 8,000
Referee: Cesare Jonni (Italy)

Borussia Dortmund won play-off 3–1.

== Quarter-finals ==
Team 1	Agg.	Team 2	1st leg	2nd leg
Manchester United (England)	5–4	(Socialist Federal Republic of Yugoslavia) Red Star Belgrade	2–1	3–3
Real Madrid (Spain)	10–2	(Spain) Sevilla	8–0	2–2
Ajax (Netherlands)	2–6	(Hungary) Vasas	2–2	0–4
Borussia Dortmund (West Germany)	2–5	(Italy) Milan	1–1	1–4

=== First leg ===
14 January 1958
20:45 CET

Manchester United (England)	2–1	(Socialist Federal Republic of Yugoslavia) Red Star Belgrade
Charlton 65'; Colman 81'	Report	Tasić 35'

Old Trafford, Manchester
Attendance: 60,000
Referee: Marcel Lequesne (France)

23 January 1958
20:15 CET

Real Madrid (Spain)	8–0	(Spain) Sevilla
Di Stéfano 10', 55' (pen.), 85', 88'; Kopa 37', 73'; Marsal 48'; Gento 81'	Report

Santiago Bernabéu, Madrid
Attendance: 76,796
Referee: Lucien Van Nuffel (Belgium)

5 February 1958
20:00 CET

Ajax (Netherlands)	2–2	(Hungary) Vasas
Ouderland 31', 42'	Report	Bundzsák 73', 82'

Olympisch Stadion, Amsterdam
Attendance: 35,000
Referee: Günther Ternieden (West Germany)

12 February 1958
20:00 CET

Borussia Dortmund (West Germany)	1–1	(Italy) Milan
Bergamaschi 90' (o.g.)	Report	Galli 45'

Stadion Rote Erde, Dortmund
Attendance: 28,000
Referee: Arthur Edward Ellis (England)

=== Second leg ===
5 February 1958
19:45 CET

Red Star Belgrade (Socialist Federal Republic of Yugoslavia)	3–3	(England) Manchester United
Kostić 46', 58'; Tasić 50'	Report	Viollet 2'; Charlton 30', 31'

Stadion JNA, Belgrade
Attendance: 52,000
Referee: Karl Kainer (Austria)

Manchester United won 5–4 on aggregate.

23 February 1958
16:30 CET

Sevilla (Spain)	2–2	(Spain) Real Madrid
Payá 22'; Pahuet 29'	Report	Pereda 48', 62'

Estadio de Nervión, Seville
Attendance: 25,000
Referee: Albert Alsteen (Belgium)

Real Madrid won 10–2 on aggregate.

26 February 1958
14:45 CET

Vasas (Hungary)	4–0	(Netherlands) Ajax
Bundzsák 7'; Szilágyi 9', 39'; Csordás 29'	Report

Népstadion, Budapest
Attendance: 70,000
Referee: Borče Nedelkovski (SFR Yugoslavia)

Vasas won 6–2 on aggregate.

26 March 1958
21:30 CET

Milan (Italy)	4–1	(West Germany) Borussia Dortmund
Cucchiaroni 11'; Liedholm 21'; Galli 63'; Grillo 86'	Report	Preissler 37'

San Siro, Milan
Attendance: 25,000
Referee: Arthur Edward Ellis (England)

Milan won 5–2 on aggregate.

== Semi-finals ==
Team 1	Agg.	Team 2	1st leg	2nd leg
Real Madrid (Spain)	4–2	(Hungary) Vasas	4–0	0–2
Manchester United (England)	2–5	(Italy) Milan	2–1	0–4

=== First leg ===
2 April 1958
20:00 CET

Real Madrid (Spain)	4–0	(Hungary) Vasas
Di Stéfano 9', 42' (pen.), 50'; Marsal 46'	Report

Santiago Bernabéu, Madrid
Attendance: 120,000
Referee: Maurice Guigue (France)

8 May 1958
21:30 CET

Manchester United (England)	2–1	(Italy) Milan
Viollet 39'; E. Taylor 80' (pen.)	Report	Schiaffino 24'

Old Trafford, Manchester
Attendance: 44,882
Referee: Leo Helge (Denmark)

=== Second leg ===
16 April 1958
17:00 CET

Vasas (Hungary)	2–0	(Spain) Real Madrid
Bundzsák 25'; Csordás 53' (pen.)	Report

Népstadion, Budapest
Attendance: 100,000
Referee: Pierre Schwinte (France)

Real Madrid won 4–2 on aggregate.

14 May 1958
22:30 CET

Milan (Italy)	4–0	(England) Manchester United
Schiaffino 2', 76'; Liedholm 51' (pen.); Danova 67'	Report

San Siro, Milan
Attendance: 60,000
Referee: Albert Dusch (West Germany)

Milan won 5–2 on aggregate.

== Final ==
28 May 1958
19:00 CET

Real Madrid (Spain)	3–2 (a.e.t.)	(Italy) Milan
Di Stéfano 74'; Rial 79'; Gento 107'	Report	Schiaffino 59'; Grillo 77'

Heysel Stadium, Brussels
Attendance: 67,000
Referee: Albert Alsteen (Belgium)

== Top goalscorers ==
The top scorers from the 1957–58 European Cup (including preliminary round) were as follows:

Rank	Player	Team	Goals
1	(Spain) Alfredo Di Stéfano	(Spain) Real Madrid	10
2	(Socialist Federal Republic of Yugoslavia) Bora Kostić	(Socialist Federal Republic of Yugoslavia) Red Star Belgrade	9
3	(Hungary) Lajos Csordás	(Hungary) Vasas	8
4	(Hungary) Dezső Bundzsák	(Hungary) Vasas	6
4	(Argentina) Ernesto Grillo	(Italy) Milan	6
6	(Italy) Gastone Bean	(Italy) Milan	5
6	(Italy) Juan Alberto Schiaffino	(Italy) Milan	5
8	(Socialist Federal Republic of Yugoslavia) Jovan Cokić	(Socialist Federal Republic of Yugoslavia) Red Star Belgrade	4
8	(Spain) Héctor Rial	(Spain) Real Madrid	4
8	(England) Dennis Viollet	(England) Manchester United	4
