= Adolfo Atienza =

Spanish footballer (1927–2008)

Personal information
- Full name: Adolfo Atienza Landeta
- Date of birth: 1 December 1927
- Place of birth: Madrid, Spain
- Date of death: 9 July 2008 (aged 80)
- Place of death: Madrid, Spain
- Position: Forward

Youth career
- ?–1942: Cuatro Caminos SC
- 1942–1943: Club Arenal

Senior career*
Years	Team	Apps	(Gls)
1943–1947	Club Arenal		
1947	Club Santiago		
1948–1953	Celta de Vigo		
1948	→ Club Berbés de Vigo (on loan)		
1953–1955	Real Madrid		
1955–1957	Las Palmas		
1957–1958	Real Jaén		
1958–1960	Celta de Vigo		
1960–1961	Ponferradina		

International career
1954	Spain	0	(0)
1954	Spain B	0	(0)
- * Club domestic league appearances and goals

Adolfo Atienza Landeta (1 December 1927 – 9 July 2008), also known as Atienza I, was a Spanish footballer who played as a forward for Celta de Vigo, Real Madrid, and Las Palmas in the 1950s. His brother Ángel also played for Real Madrid.

== Playing career ==
=== Early career ===
Born in Madrid on 1 December 1927, Atienza began playing football in his hometown, first informally for teams based in the Tetuán de las Victorias neighborhood, and then officially with the Cuatro Caminos Sports Club, where he played until 1942, the year his family moved to Galicia, after his parents, both professors, were assigned to the University of Santiago de Compostela.

In 1943, the 15-year-old Atienza was already playing in the top local regional league with Club Arenal, a team composed mainly of students, with whom he played for four years, until 1947, when he was signed by Club Santiago, then in the Tercera División. In December 1947, after only five official matches for Santiago, all in the Copa Galicia, he was signed by First Division club Celta de Vigo, then coached by Ricardo Zamora. After the first training sessions, however, it became clear that he was ready to make the jump to the top division, so the coaching staff decided to loan him to the Third Division Club Berbés de Vigo, along with Juanín and Eduardo Sobrado, where he played the second half of the 1947–48 season.

=== Vigo and Madrid ===
On 24 October 1948, the 20-year Atienza made his La Liga debut, against FC Barcelona, showing great promise as a center forward, and helping his side to a 2–2 draw. He was a member of the great Celta team of the early 1950s known as "The Blue Devils", which also included Francisco Roig, Yayo Sanz, and Hermidita. He stayed loyal to Vigo for five years, from 1948 to 1953, during which he stood out for his goal-scoring prowess, netting an impressive 45 goals in 109 games. He thus eventually drew the attention of Real Madrid, who signed him in the summer of 1953, with Celta receiving 600,000 pesetas as well as the winger Antoni Gausí on loan.

Atienza played for Los blancos between 1953 and 1955, scoring 8 goals in 25 matches, and playing an active role in the team that won back-to-back La Liga titles in 1953–54 and 1954–55, as well as a Latin Cup in 1955. During his two years in Madrid, he coincided not only with Alfredo Di Stéfano, but also with his brother Ángel Atienza. In order to distinguish them in the press, the local newspapers started referring to them as Atienza I and Atienza II.

=== Later career ===
After leaving Madrid in 1955, Atienza played two seasons at Las Palmas (1955–57), and another one at Real Jaén (1957–58), before returning to Celta in 1958. His first season back with the Galician club, however, ended in relegation to the Segunda División, and he ended up leaving the club in the following season, after failing to return to the top flight. He played his last season of football at third division side Ponferradina in 1960–61. In total, he scored 67 goals in 192 La Liga matches for Celta, Madrid, Las Palmas, and Real Jaén.

== International career ==
During his first stint at Vigo, Atienza's impressive goal-scoring form earned him six call-ups for the training of the Spain national team, but he failed to leave the bench in any of those occasions. He was also called up for Spain B's opening match of the 1953–58 Mediterranean Cup, but once again remained as an unused substitute as the Spanish claimed a 2–0 win over France B. Spain eventually won the tournament.

== Death ==
Atienza died in Madrid on 9 July 2008, at the age of 80.

== Honours ==
Real Madrid

- La Liga:
  - Champions (2): 1953–54 and 1954–55
- Latin Cup:
  - Champions (1): 1955

== See also ==
- List of Real Madrid CF players
- List of La Liga hat-tricks
