= Etura =

Etura is a surname. Notable people with the surname include:

- Manuel Etura (1934–2026), Spanish footballer
- Marta Etura (born 1978), Spanish actress

== See also ==
- Etar Architectural-Ethnographic Complex
