= Ruzza =

Ruzza is a surname. Notable people with the surname include:

- Bruno Ruzza (1926–2019), Italian footballer
- Federico Ruzza (born 1994), Italian rugby player
- Iliana Ruzza, Venezuelan public official
- Sandra Oblitas Ruzza (born 1969), Venezuelan public official
