= Narciso Soldan =

Italian footballer (1927–1987)

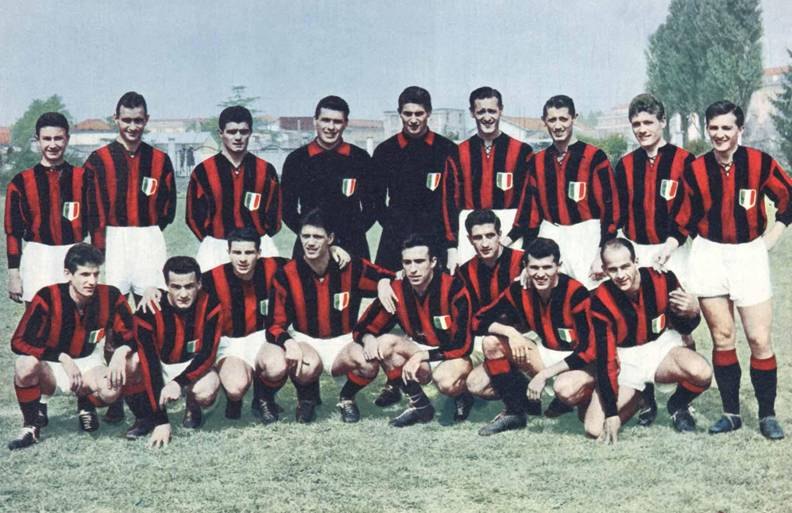
- Narciso Soldan (standing, fourth from right) with the AC Milan

Personal information
- Date of birth: 11 December 1927
- Place of birth: Nervesa della Battaglia, Kingdom of Italy
- Date of death: 30 July 1987 (aged 59)
- Place of death: Conegliano, Italy
- Height: 1.74 m (5 ft 9 in)
- Position: Goalkeeper

Youth career
- Vittorio Falmec

Senior career*
Years	Team	Apps	(Gls)
1947–1949	Vittorio Falmec		
1949–1951	Inter Milan	42	(0)
1951–1953	Catania	69	(0)
1953–1954	Torino	27	(0)
1954–1956	Triestina	54	(0)
1956–1959	AC Milan	36	(0)
1959–1961	Torino	41	(0)
1961–1962	Treviso	22	(0)
Total		291	(0)
- * Club domestic league appearances and goals

Narciso Soldan (11 December 1927 – 30 July 1987) was an Italian professional footballer who played as a goalkeeper in the Italian Football League.

== Career ==
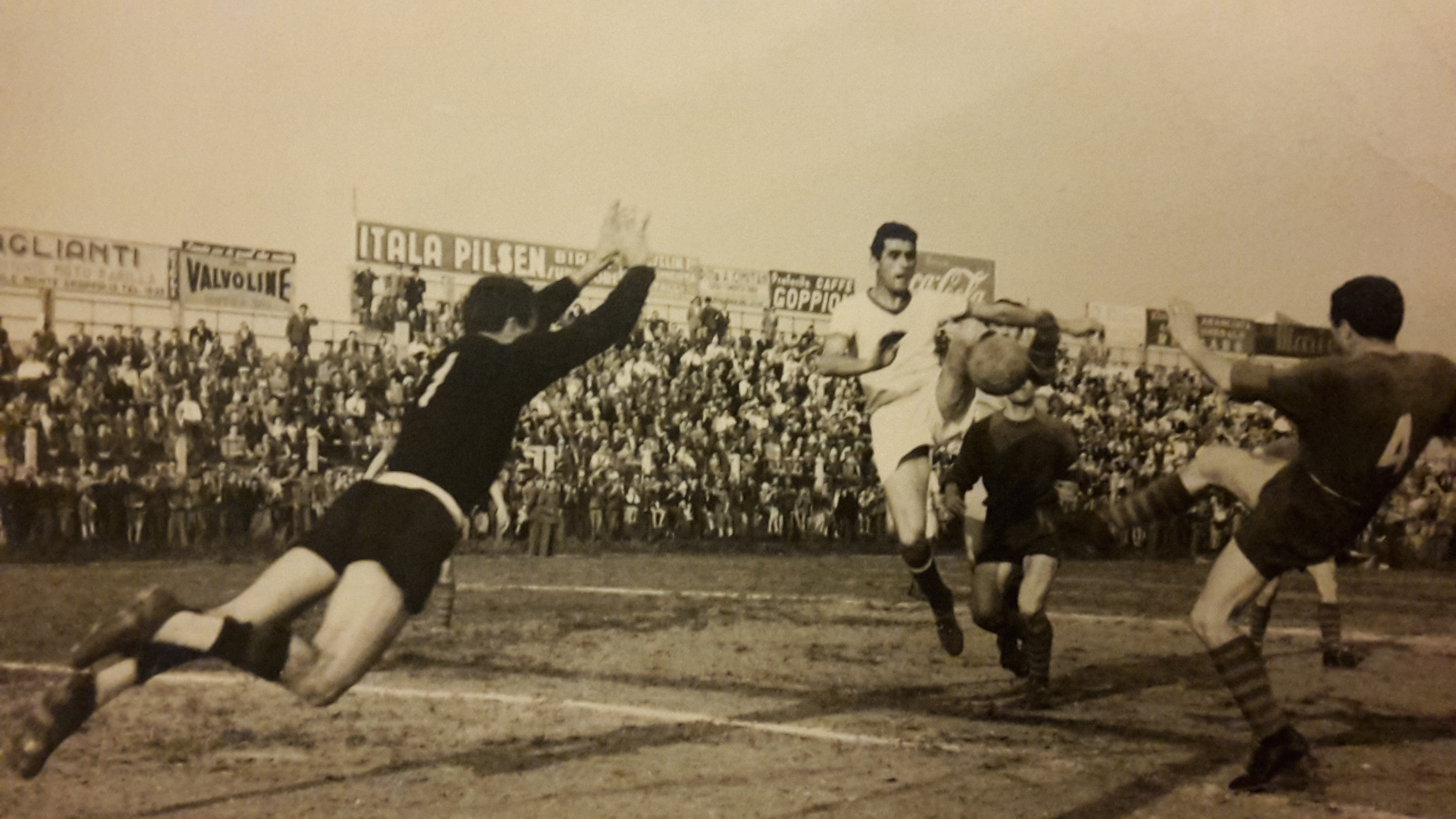
Treviso–Catania (0–0) during the 1951–52 Serie B season. From left to right: Soldan, Ruzza (Treviso Calcio) and Italo Rebuzzi.

Soldan was born in Nervesa della Battaglia, Veneto in 1927. He began his playing career at the very late age of 19, having never previously kicked a ball. One day, while attending a local club match at Vittorio Veneto, he became fascinated by the goalkeeper's role on the playing field. At the end of the match he went onto the pitch, along with some friends, and had them take some shots at him. The team's coach, Enrico Colombari, approached Soldan and an agreement was made whereby Soldan signed his first professional football contract with Vittorio Veneto for the 1946–47 season. For the remainder of the season, he was loaned out to his local team, F.C. Nervesa, to gain some experience and match practice.

The following year (1947–48), Narciso Soldan was playing in Italy's third division: Serie C - North League: Group H. After a fantastic season, Vittorio Veneto arrived in 3rd place and just missed promotion to the "New" Serie C.

The 1948–49 season didn't go as well for Vittorio Veneto as the previous one had. The club was now playing in the new, recently named Promozione Interregionale - 4th Division: Group E. The team struggled for long periods throughout the season but managed to finish in a respectable 10th position. On the one hand while the team wasn't performing so well, for Narciso Soldan, it became the turning point in his career. After having a great season defending his goal, coach Enrico Colombari decided to try his luck by taking young Soldan for trials in Milan under the watchful eyes of Giulio Cappelli, then Manager of F.C. Internazionale Milano. Soldan spent two seasons with Inter in Serie A, before moving to Catania in Serie B in 1951, where he took part in the club's 4–1 defeat to Legnano in the Serie A promotion play-offs during his second season. He subsequently played for Torino and Triestina in Serie A.

He returned to play in Milan during the 1956–57 Serie A season, but to join Inter's cross-city rivals A.C. Milan. Despite competition from Lorenzo Buffon, he managed to win two league titles during his time with the club, and also reached the 1958 European Cup Final, only to be defeated 3–2 by Real Madrid in extra-time. During the 1959–60 season, he joined Torino F.C. in Serie B and helped the team win the second division title to obtain Serie A promotion; after two seasons with the Turin club, he ended his career with Treviso in Serie C in 1962.

Soldan died in Conegliano, Veneto in 1987.

== Career statistics ==
=== Club ===
Season	Club	Division	Games Played	Table Position	Awards / Comments
1946–47	Nervesa	Youth Team	?	?	On loan from Vittorio Veneto
1947–48	Vittorio Veneto	Serie C ~ Lega Nord : Girone H	?	3rd	Relegated to the "new" 4th Division ~ Campionato Interregionale
1948–49	Vittorio Veneto	Promozione Interregionale ~ IV : Girone E	?	10th	Taken to Milano, by Coach Enrico Colombari, for trials with Inter
1949–50	Internazionale	Serie A	21	3rd	Bronze Award for third place
1950–51	Internazionale	Serie A	21	2nd	Silver Award for second place
1951–52	Catania	Serie B	34	4th	-
1952–53	Catania	Serie B	34	3rd	Lost Serie A Promotion Play-off in Florence : Legnano 4-1 Catania
1953–54	Torino	Serie A	27	9th	-
1954–55	Triestina	Serie A	27	12th	-
1955–56	Triestina	Serie A	27	16th	-
1956–57	Milan	Serie A	17	1st	Champions of Italy ~ 6th Scudetto
1957–58	Milan	Serie A	11	9th	European Champion Clubs' Cup Finalist : Real Madrid 3-2 Milan (aet)
1958–59	Milan	Serie A	8	1st	Champions of Italy ~ 7th Scudetto
1959–60	Torino	Serie B	32	1st	Serie B Champions ~ Promotion to Serie A
1960–61	Torino	Serie A	9	12th	-
1961–62	Treviso	Serie C	22	10th	Girone A

== Honours ==
Milan

- Serie A: 1956–57, 1958–59

Torino

- Serie B: 1959–60
