= 1958 Copa del Generalísimo final =

Copa del Generalísimo 1958 final
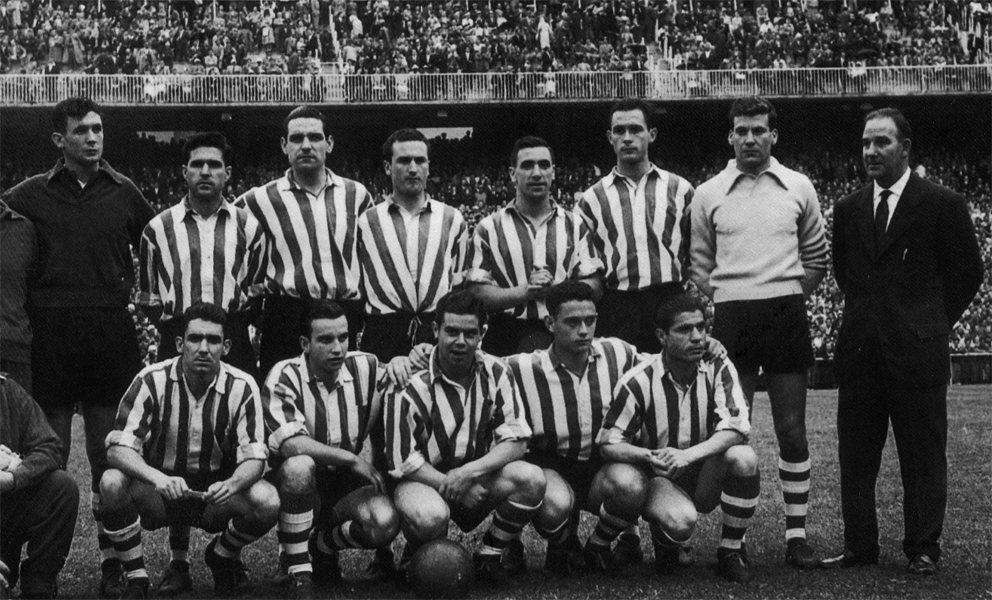
- Team of Athletic Bilbao, champions
- Event: 1958 Copa del Generalísimo
Atlético Bilbao	Real Madrid
2	0
- Date: 29 June 1958
- Venue: Estadio Chamartín, Madrid
- Referee: José Luis González Echeverría
- Attendance: 100,000

The Copa del Generalísimo 1958 final was the 56th final of the King's Cup. The final was played at Estadio Chamartín in Madrid, on 29 June 1958, being won by Atlético de Bilbao, who beat Real Madrid 2–0.

Although both clubs remained among the regulars competing for trophies, they did not meet in another final again until the 2021–22 Supercopa de España, almost 64 years later.

== Match details ==
29 June 1958
18:15 CET

Atlético Bilbao	2–0	Real Madrid
Arieta 20'; Mauri 23'	Report (in Spanish)

Estadio Chamartín, Madrid
Attendance: 100,000
Referee: José Luis González Echeverría

Athletic Bilbao

Real Madrid

GK	1	(Spain) Carmelo Cedrún
DF	2	(Spain) José Orúe
DF	3	(Spain) Jesús Garay
DF	4	(Spain) Canito
MF	5	(Spain) Manuel Etura
MF	6	(Spain) Mauri
FW	7	(Spain) Ignacio Uribe
FW	8	(Spain) Koldo Aguirre
FW	9	(Spain) Eneko Arieta
FW	10	(Spain) José Artetxe
FW	11	(Spain) Agustín Gaínza (c)
Manager:
(Spain) Baltasar Albéniz

GK	1	(Spain) Juan Alonso (c)
DF	2	(Spain) Ángel Atienza
DF	3	(Uruguay) José Emilio Santamaría
DF	4	(Spain) Rafael Lesmes
MF	5	(Spain) Juan Santisteban
MF	6	(Spain) José María Zárraga
FW	7	(Spain) Joseíto
FW	8	(Spain) Enrique Mateos
FW	9	(Argentina) Alfredo Di Stéfano
FW	10	(Argentina) Héctor Rial
FW	11	(Spain) Jesús Pereda
Manager:
(Argentina) Luis Carniglia

== See also ==
- El Viejo Clásico
