= Manuel Etura =

Spanish footballer (1934–2026)

Personal information
- Full name: Manuel González Etura
- Date of birth: 21 February 1933
- Place of birth: Sestao, Spain
- Date of death: 18 March 2026 (aged 93)
- Place of death: Spain
- Height: 1.84 m (6 ft 0 in)
- Position: Defensive midfielder

Senior career*
Years	Team	Apps	(Gls)
1952–1953	Getxo	4	(0)
1953–1966	Athletic Bilbao	205	(2)
1966–1967	Indautxu	26	(0)
Total		235	(2)

International career
1957–1961	Spain B	3	(0)
- * Club domestic league appearances and goals

Manuel González Etura (21 February 1933 – 18 March 2026) was a Spanish footballer who played as a defensive midfielder.

== Career ==
Born in Sestao, Biscay, Etura spent 13 seasons in La Liga with Athletic Bilbao after signing in summer 1953 from neighbouring CD Getxo. He only totalled 16 games in his first three years, his debut coming on 12 December 1954 in a 3–0 home win against Hércules CF.

During his tenure at the San Mamés Stadium, Etura appeared in 247 matches in all competitions, scoring three goals. His first in the league came on 27 September 1959, but in a 3–2 away loss to Granada CF.

Etura won four titles with his main club, included the 1955–56 national championship to which he contributed nine appearances. In the final of the 1958 Copa del Generalísimo, he marked Real Madrid superstar Alfredo Di Stéfano in the 2–0 victory at the Bernabéu.

Etura retired in 1967 aged 34, following a spell in the Segunda División with SD Indautxu.

== Personal life and death ==
Etura became a widower at the age of 38. He began working before his retirement, and later was a sales representative in his native region.

On 18 March 2026, Etura died at 93.

== Honours ==
Athletic Bilbao

- La Liga: 1955–56
- Copa del Generalísimo: 1955, 1956, 1958
