= Auro Enzo Basiliani =

Italian footballer (1934–2025)

Personal information
- Date of birth: 10 September 1934
- Place of birth: La Spezia, Italy
- Date of death: 14 August 2025 (aged 90)
- Height: 1.66 m (5 ft 5 1/2 in)
- Position: Defender

Senior career*
| Years | Team | Apps | (Gls) |
| 1952–1953 | Rapallo Ruentes 1914 | | |
| 1954–1956 | Spezia | 64 | (2) |
| 1956–1963 | Hellas Verona | 180 | (13) |
| 1963–1965 | Lucchese | 51 | (4) |
| Total | | ? | (?) |
- * Club domestic league appearances and goals

Auro Enzo Basiliani (10 September 1934 – 14 August 2025) was an Italian footballer who played as a defender.

Basiliani played 146 total matches in Serie B and 34 matches in Serie A while playing for Spezia, Hellas Verona, and Lucchese.

Basiliani died on 14 August 2025, at the age of 90.
