= Dezső Bundzsák =

Hungarian footballer and coach

Personal information
- Date of birth: 3 May 1928
- Place of birth: Kiskunhalas, Hungary
- Date of death: 1 October 2010 (aged 82)
- Place of death: Budapest, Hungary
- Positions: Striker; midfielder

Senior career*
Years	Team	Apps	(Gls)
1950–1964	Vasas SC	249	(73)

International career
1956–1961	Hungary	25	(1)

Managerial career
- 1966–1968: Pierikos
- 1968–1970: Panionios
- 1970–1972: Apollon Athens
- 1979: Egypt
- 1980–1982: Vasas SC
- 1983–1984: Panachaiki
- 1984–1985: Pierikos
- * Club domestic league appearances and goals

Dezső Bundzsák (3 May 1928 – 1 October 2010) was a Hungarian football coach and player who played for the national team. Bundzsák played as a striker or midfielder at both professional and international levels, before becoming a coach who worked throughout Europe and Africa.

== Playing career ==
Born in Kiskunhalas, Bundzsák began his professional career in 1950 with Vasas SC. Bundzsák spent 14 seasons with the club, scoring 73 goals in 249 games. He represented Vasas at the 1957–58 European Cup.

He also represented Hungary at international level, earning 25 caps between 1956 and 1961. He also played at the 1958 FIFA World Cup.

== Coaching career ==
Bundzsák coached a number of club sides in Greece, such as Pierikos, Panionios, Apollon Athens, Panachaiki and Hungary, including former club Vasas SC. He also managed the Egypt national team in 1979.

== Death ==
Bundzsák died on 1 October 2010, aged 82.
