= Bruno Ruzza =

Italian footballer (1926–2019)

Bruno Ruzza (10 February 1926, in Padua – 13 September 2019, in Padua) was an Italian former footballer who played as a defender.

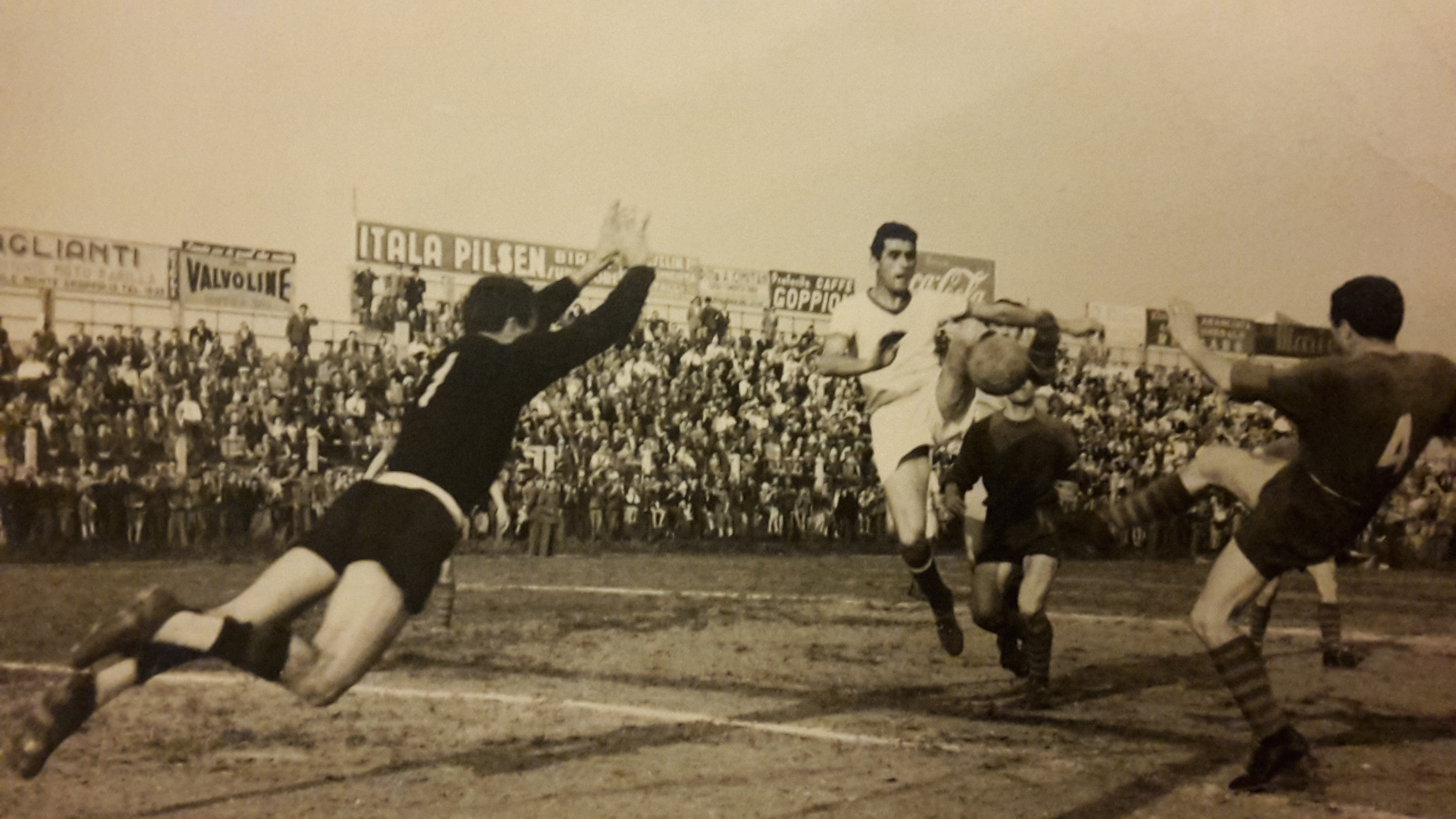
Ruzza (Treviso, in white) against Narciso Soldan and Italo Rebuzzi (Catania)

== Career ==
He started playing as a forward with Padova Calcio in the Campionato Alta Italia 1943-44. With Treviso Calcio and Padova Calcio he played six seasons in Serie B.

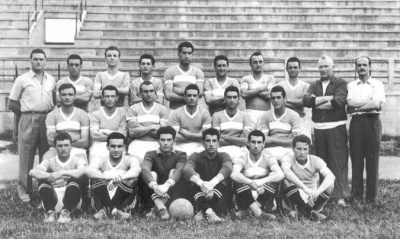
Players of Treviso Calcio 1951–1952. From left to right. Standing: Rocco (coach), Zian, Padoan, Dozzo, Vascellari, Persi, Bonaretti, Aliprandi, Maronilli (fitness coach), Moretto (assistant). Second row: Pavanello: Bearzi, Chiodi, Minozzi, Zorzi, Ruzza. Third: Donzelli, Realini, Pozzan, Moretto, Cattozzo, Sari.

In 1953, he was banned from competitions due to possible corruption in the match Padova-Calcio Catania. He then joined Padova again till his last season, 1956–1957.

Season	Club	Apps	Goals
Campionato Alta Italia 1943–1944	Padova	1	0
1946–47 Serie B	Treviso	38	0
1947–48 Serie B	Padova	14	1
1948–49 Serie C	Treviso	?	?
1949–50 Serie C	Treviso	?	?
1950–51 Serie B	Treviso	?	?
1951–52 Serie B	Treviso	?	?
1952–53 Serie B	Treviso	?	?
1956–57 Serie B	Padova	0	0
