= 1952–53 Serie B =

Italian football league season

Serie B
- Season: 1952–53
- Champions: Genoa; 2nd title

Serie B 1952-53 team distribution

The Serie B 1952–53 was the twenty-first tournament of this competition played in Italy since its creation.

== Teams ==
Cagliari had been promoted from Serie C, while Lucchese, Padova and Legnano had been relegated from Serie A.

== Events ==
Relegations were reduced to two teams.

== Final classification ==
Pos	Team	Pld	W	D	L	GF	GA	GR	Pts	Promotion or relegation
1	Genoa (P, C)	34	16	12	6	38	23	1.652	44	Promotion to Serie A
2	Legnano (P)	34	17	7	10	52	32	1.625	41	Serie A after tie-breaker
3	Catania	34	16	9	9	39	28	1.393	41	Promotion tie-breaker
4	Messina	34	15	8	11	42	34	1.235	38	
4	Brescia	34	13	12	9	33	28	1.179	38	
4	Cagliari	34	14	10	10	51	44	1.159	38	
4	Monza	34	15	8	11	44	38	1.158	38	
8	Marzotto	34	13	10	11	33	31	1.065	36	
9	Treviso	34	12	11	11	33	34	0.971	35	
10	Modena	34	12	10	12	34	33	1.030	34	
11	Salernitana	34	10	13	11	31	41	0.756	33	
12	Vicenza (Note: A.C. Vicenza changed its name to Lanerossi Vicenza A.C. at the end of the season.)	34	10	12	12	38	43	0.884	32	
13	Verona	34	12	7	15	41	47	0.872	31	
14	Fanfulla	34	10	10	14	47	46	1.022	30	
15	Piombino	34	8	12	14	33	40	0.825	28	
15	Padova	34	10	8	16	36	45	0.800	28	
17	Siracusa (R)	34	8	11	15	30	42	0.714	27	Relegation to Serie C
18	Lucchese (Note: 18 points deducted for a corruption case.) (R)	34	5	10	19	27	53	0.509	2	Relegation to Serie C

Source: Panini
(C) Champions; (P) Promoted; (R) Relegated

== Results ==
Home \ Away	BRE	CAG	CTN	FAN	GEN	LEG	LUC	MAR	MES	MOD	MON	PAD	PIO	SAL	SIR	TRV	HEL	VIC
Brescia		3–2	1–0	1–0	3–0	1–0	1–0	0–0	1–1	0–0	0–1	0–0	1–0	3–1	4–1	3–2	0–0	1–0
Cagliari	2–1		2–2	2–1	1–1	2–2	3–0	2–0	3–1	0–0	2–1	1–0	1–1	3–2	0–0	1–1	6–0	1–0
Catania	2–0	2–0		3–2	1–1	2–0	0–0	3–0	2–1	1–0	2–1	2–0	2–0	1–1	1–0	1–0	2–1	2–1
Fanfulla	2–0	2–2	0–0		1–1	2–1	0–0	2–2	0–1	2–1	3–0	2–0	2–1	3–0	6–0	1–2	2–1	3–2
Genoa	0–0	2–0	1–0	1–0		2–0	3–0	0–0	1–0	1–2	2–1	2–0	3–0	0–0	1–0	0–0	2–0	3–1
Legnano	1–0	5–0	2–1	2–0	4–0		3–1	1–0	2–0	4–2	5–1	3–0	2–1	4–0	1–1	2–1	2–0	1–0
Lucchese	0–0	3–4	3–1	1–1	1–2	2–1		1–1	0–1	0–2	1–1	1–3	2–0	0–0	1–0	0–2	1–2	1–1
Marzotto	1–0	3–0	2–0	3–2	0–1	1–0	1–0		0–0	1–4	1–1	1–0	1–1	4–0	2–0	2–0	1–0	2–0
Messina	2–1	1–0	1–0	4–1	1–1	2–0	3–0	2–0		1–0	3–1	1–0	3–0	0–0	2–1	1–2	1–1	2–0
Modena	0–1	1–0	1–1	3–1	0–0	0–1	1–0	0–1	2–0		0–2	2–1	1–0	0–0	1–0	0–0	2–1	3–0
Monza	0–1	1–0	3–0	3–2	0–1	1–1	2–2	1–0	1–1	3–0		0–0	1–0	2–1	3–1	0–0	2–1	2–0
Padova	3–0	1–1	0–2	1–0	1–1	1–1	2–0	2–0	4–2	1–1	1–0		3–3	0–1	3–0	0–0	4–1	0–1
Piombino	3–2	0–2	1–0	2–0	0–0	2–0	3–1	0–0	2–0	2–2	0–1	5–1		0–0	1–0	0–1	0–2	2–2
Salernitana	0–0	1–0	0–0	1–1	1–0	1–1	1–3	3–0	3–1	1–1	1–0	2–0	1–1		1–1	1–0	2–1	3–0
Siracusa	1–1	0–1	1–2	1–1	1–1	3–0	1–0	1–1	0–0	2–0	2–1	0–1	0–0	4–0		2–0	2–1	2–0
Treviso	2–2	0–3	1–0	1–1	2–1	0–0	1–1	2–1	1–0	2–1	0–1	3–1	2–2	2–1	0–0		0–1	1–2
Hellas Verona	1–1	3–1	0–0	1–1	0–2	2–0	3–0	2–1	2–1	1–1	1–3	4–2	1–0	1–0	4–1	1–2		0–1
Vicenza	0–0	3–3	1–1	2–0	2–1	0–0	3–1	0–0	2–2	2–0	3–3	2–0	0–0	4–1	1–1	1–0	1–1	

Source: Almanacco Illustrato del Calcio - La Storia 1898-2004, Panini Edizioni, Modena, September 2005 (in Italian)
Legend: Blue = home team win; Yellow = draw; Red = away team win.

== Promotion tie-breaker ==
Played in Florence on 28 July

Team 1	Score	Team 2
Catania (Italy)	1-4	(Italy) Legnano

Legnano promoted to Serie A.

== See also ==
- Bruno Ruzza

== References and sources ==
- Almanacco Illustrato del Calcio - La Storia 1898-2004, Panini Edizioni, Modena, September 2005
