= Juanín (footballer, born 1925) =

Spanish footballer

Personal information
- Full name: Juan Cortiñas Méndez
- Date of birth: 24 October 1925
- Place of birth: Monforte de Lemos, Spain
- Position: Midfielder

Senior career*
Years	Team	Apps	(Gls)
1948–1953	Celta Vigo	38	(22)
1956–1957	Deportivo La Coruña	2	(1)
Total		40	(23)
- * Club domestic league appearances and goals

Juan Cortiñas Méndez, known as Juanín (born 24 October 1925) was a Spanish professional footballer who played as a midfielder.

== Career ==
Born in Monforte de Lemos, Juanín played for Celta Vigo and Deportivo La Coruña.
