= Bolesław Lewandowski =

Polish footballer

Personal information
- Date of birth: 5 June 1935
- Place of birth: Kalisz, Poland
- Date of death: 11 January 2003 (aged 67)
- Height: 1.72 m (5 ft 8 in)
- Position: Forward

Senior career*
| Years | Team | Apps | (Gls) |
| –1956 | Calisia Kalisz | | |
| 1956–1967 | Gwardia Warsaw | | |
- Gwardia Szczytno

International career
| 1957 | Poland | 1 | (0) |

Managerial career
- Gwardia Szczytno (player-manager)
- * Club domestic league appearances and goals

Bolesław Lewandowski (5 June 1935 – 11 January 2003) was a Polish footballer. He played in one match for the Poland national football team in 1957.
