= Gastone Bean =

Italian footballer

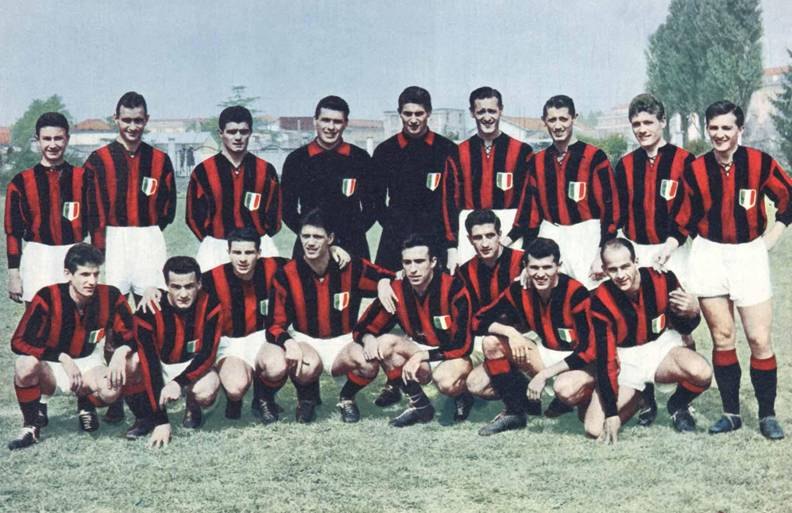
- Alfio Fontana (standing, first from right) with the AC Milan squad for the 1957–58 season

Personal information
- Full name: Gastone Bean
- Date of birth: 11 August 1936 (age 90)
- Place of birth: San Canzian d'Isonzo, Italy
- Height: 1.69 m (5 ft 6 1/2 in)
- Position: Striker

Youth career
- 1952–1953: San Canzian Calcio
- 1953–1955: A.C. Milan

Senior career*
Years	Team	Apps	(Gls)
1955–1960	A.C. Milan	87	(39)
1955–1956	→ Piacenza (loan)	21	(23)
1960–1964	Genoa	123	(46)
1964–1967	Napoli	45	(10)
1967–1969	Spal	22	(2)

International career
1957–1958	Italy	4	(0)

Managerial career
- 1969–1973: Bellaria Igea
- 1973–1974: Ravenna
- 1974–1977: Cattolica
- 1980–1981: Lecco
- 1981–1983: Benevento
- 1983–1984: Barletta
- 1984–1985: Casertana
- 1986–1987: Cavese
- 1988–1989: Fasano
- * Club domestic league appearances and goals

Gastone Bean (Italian pronunciation: [ɡaˈstoːne beˈan]; born 11 August 1936) is a former Italian professional footballer who played as a striker.

== Club career ==
Growing up in San Canzian d'Isonzo, he joined A.C. Milan as a youngster. He played on loan at Piacenza, scoring 23 goals in 21 games in the 1955–56 C-Series season.

He made his Milan debut on 14 October 1956. At the end of the 1956–57 Season the Rossoneri won the title thanks to his decisive contribution of 17 goals, including the initial goal in the derby on 10 March 1957, which ended with a 1–1 draw. He was the fourth best goalscorer of the season, and was voted "favourite Champion 1957" by the Italian magazine Il calcio e il ciclismo illustrato. With Carlo Galli alternated in the role of striker, the two took up the legacy of Gunnar Nordahl, who had moved to AS Roma. In the next season he scored 10 goals, always alternating with Galli. The 1958–59 season ended with another championship title.

Despite a tally of 39 goals in four seasons, in 1960 he moved to Genoa, to be paired with Eddie Firmani. On 2 April 1961, Bean scored four goals past Novara, however, the Griffins remained in Serie B because of a penalty. The promotion came in 1961–62, when the MLS closed the season 64 goals and eleven points ahead of Naples, who finished second. Bean, deployed as a left winger, produced 20 goals. He was in Genoa for four seasons, contributing to the achievement of the Cup of the Alps in 1964 and Friendship Cup in 1963.

Sold to Naples, in Serie B, he helped them to win promotion to the top flight in his first season in Campania.

He ended his career in Naples in 1969, joining Bellaria Igea as player-coach.

== International career ==
He was summoned to the national team during the qualifying flop for the 1958 FIFA World Cup. In total he played 4 games at international level.

== Management career ==
After retiring as a player he spent twenty years as a coach with lower league sides Bellaria Igea, Ravenna, Cattolica, Lecco, Benevento, Barletta, Casertana, Cavese, and Fasano.

== Honours ==
=== Club ===
A.C. Milan

- Serie A: 1956–57, 1958–59

Genoa

- Serie B: 1961–62
