= Lajos Csordás =

Hungarian footballer (1932–1968)

Personal information
- Date of birth: 26 October 1932
- Place of birth: Budapest, Hungary
- Date of death: 5 April 1968 (aged 35)
- Place of death: Budapest, Hungary
- Position: Striker

Senior career*
Years	Team	Apps	(Gls)
1950–1962	Vasas SC		
1962–1963	Csepel SC		

International career
1952–1959	Hungary	19	(8)

Managerial career
- 1966–1967: Vasas SC
- 1968: Budafoki MTE
Medal record
Representing Hungary
Olympic Games
Gold medal – first place	1952 Helsinki
FIFA World Cup
Runner-up	1954 Switzerland
- * Club domestic league appearances and goals

Lajos Csordás (26 October 1932 – 5 April 1968) was a Hungarian footballer. He won the gold medal at the 1952 Summer Olympics and was runner-up of the 1954 FIFA World Cup.
