= Ángel Atienza =

Spanish footballer and artist (1931–2015)

Personal information
- Full name: Ángel Atienza Landeta
- Date of birth: 16 March 1931
- Place of birth: Madrid, Spain
- Date of death: 23 August 2015 (aged 84)
- Place of death: Madrid, Spain
- Position: Defender

Senior career*
Years	Team	Apps	(Gls)
1949–1951	Lucense	47	(0)
1951–1954	Zaragoza	60	(5)
1954–1959	Real Madrid	73	(0)
Total		180	(5)
- * Club domestic league appearances and goals

Ángel Atienza Landeta (16 March 1931 – 23 August 2015) was a Spanish artist and footballer who played as a defender for Real Madrid, with whom he won the inaugural European Cup.

== Football career ==
Atienza was born in the Spanish capital of Madrid and retired from professional football on 1 July 1960. Over the course of his career, he played for Real Zaragoza and Real Madrid, winning La Liga and the European Cup thrice each for the latter. Already interested in art, he worked as an artist in the period between playing for Zaragoza and Madrid.

== Art career ==
During his football career, Atienza participated in group exhibitions and maintained ties with the artistic world in his spare time. In 1958, during a journey in Central Europe, he discovered coloured glass fitted in concrete as an artistic expression. Subsequently, he started to collaborate with other artists, retired from football, and began making mosaic murals and stained glass pieces. In 1964, he started to create ceramic murals. His first work was at the Carlton Rioja Hotel in Logroño. He moved to Venezuela in 1976 and began incorporating new materials in his mural work, such as iron, bronze, and aluminium. He participated directly in various architectural projects in order to obtain harmony between his works and their surroundings. In 2001, he returned to Spain, where he continued working on paintings and participating in exhibitions and showrooms.

== Personal life ==
His older brother Adolfo Atienza was also a footballer, who played as a forward for Celta de Vigo, Real Madrid, Las Palmas, Real Jaén, and the Spanish national team. They played together for Madrid during the 1954–55 season.

== Honours and awards ==
=== Football ===
- La Liga: 1954–55, 1956–57, 1957–58
- European Cup: 1956, 1957, 1958, 1959

=== Art ===
- Savings Bank of Málaga national prize (Málaga)
- Honorary plaque of San Juan Bosco Church (Los Teques, Venezuela)
- Juan Fernandez of Leon Distinction (Guanare, Venezuela)

== Exhibitions ==
- 1964: Daily Town, exhibitions room (Madrid)
- 1972: Rottembourg Art Gallery (Madrid)
- 1972: Hilton Hotel, exhibitions room (Brussels)
- 1973: Lambert Monet Art Gallery (Geneva)
- 1975: Rottembourg Art Gallery, group exhibition (Madrid)
- 1975: La Coruña, exhibition room (Spain)
- 2003: Sala Barna Art Gallery (Barcelona)
- 2003: MAC 21 International Contemporary Art Fair (Marbella, Spain)
- 2003: Frankfurter Buchmesse Art Fair (Frankfurt)
- 2004: Sala Sorolla Art Gallery (Terrassa)
- 2004: Sala Barna Art Gallery, group exhibitions (Barcelona)
- 2004: Frankfurter Buchmesse Art Fair Art Fair (Frankfurt)
- 2004: Museum of the Americas (Miami)
- 2005–2006: Torreón Fortea, exhibition room (Zaragoza)
- 2006: Sala Barna Art Gallery (Barcelona)
- 2006: Holland Art Fair (The Hague)
- 2007: Sala Barna Art Gallery (Barcelona)
- 2008: Sala Esart Art Gallery, Winter Showroom (Barcelona)
- 2008: Sala Pia Almoina Art Gallery (Barcelona)

== See also ==
- Ernie Barnes, an American football player who became an artist after retiring
