= Ernesto Grillo =

Argentine footballer

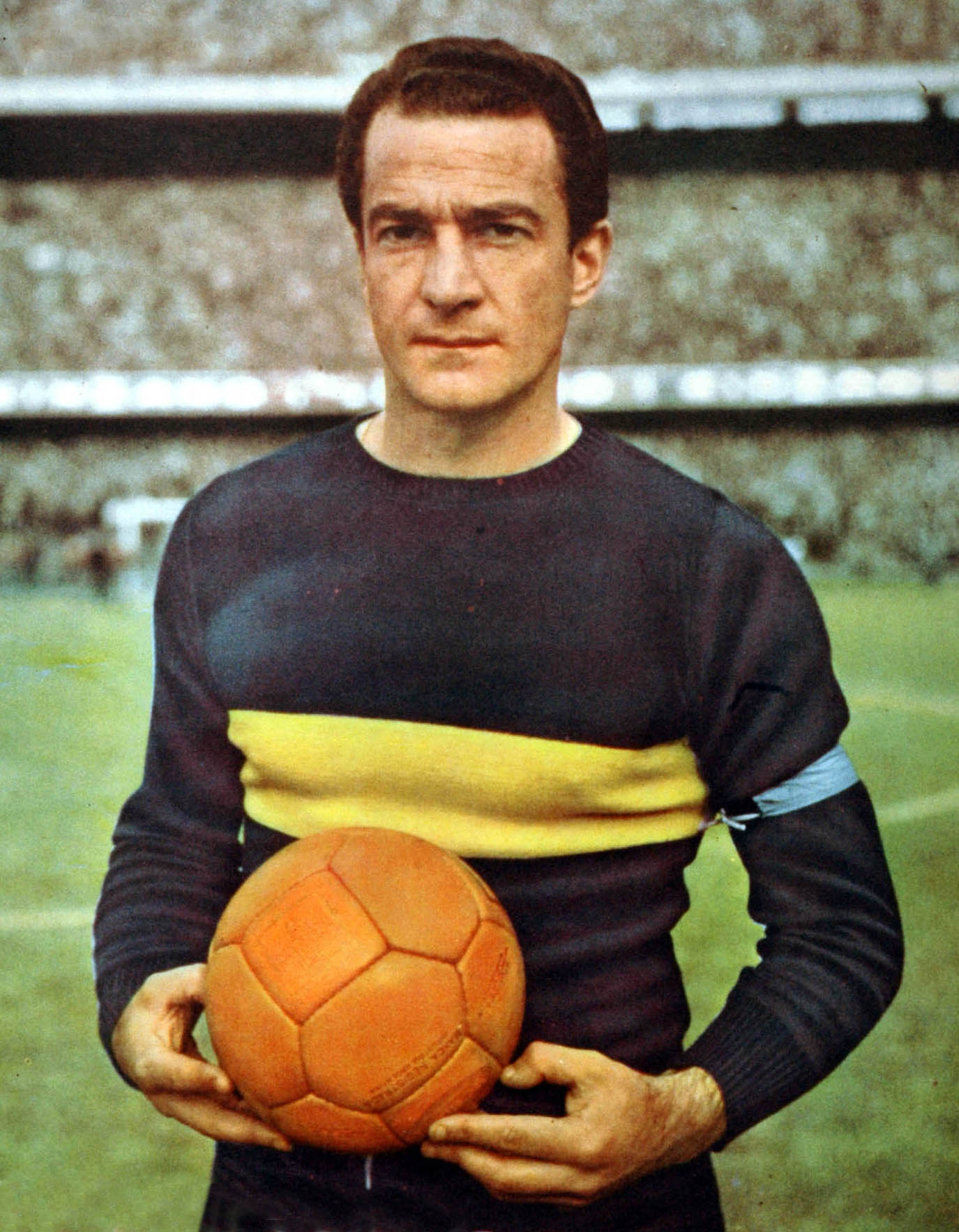
- Grillo during his tenure on Boca Juniors in 1964

Personal information
- Date of birth: 1 October 1929
- Place of birth: Buenos Aires, Argentina
- Date of death: 18 June 1998 (aged 68)
- Place of death: Buenos Aires, Argentina
- Position: Midfielder

Youth career
- 1947: River Plate
- 1947–1949: Independiente

Senior career*
Years	Team	Apps	(Gls)
1949–1957	Independiente	192	(90)
1957–1960	A.C. Milan	96	(30)
1960–1966	Boca Juniors	88	(11)

International career
1952–1962	Argentina	20	(8)
- * Club domestic league appearances and goals

Ernesto Grillo (1 October 1929 – 18 June 1998) was an Argentine footballer who played as a midfielder for Independiente and Boca Juniors in Argentina, as well as A.C. Milan in Italy. He also represented the Argentina national team. He is included in the Argentine Football Association Hall of Fame. He became a legend when playing for Argentina, scoring the goal against England which beat 3–1 in 1953.

== Biography ==
After learning his trade in the youth teams of River Plate and Independiente, Grillo started his professional playing career in 1949 with Independiente.

The highlight of Grillo's career came on 14 May 1953 in a match versus England, when he scored a legendary goal for Argentina. That was the second time England arrived in South America after the 1950 FIFA World Cup held in Brazil, and the team had remained unbeaten until the match, which was played at River Plate. That goal instituted 14 May as "Argentine Footballers' Day".

In 1955, Grillo was part of the national squad that won the South American Championship 1955. In 1957, he moved to Italy where he won the 1958–59 Serie A championship with A.C. Milan.

He returned to Argentina in 1960 to play for Boca Juniors, where he played 101 matches and scored 11 goals in all competitions and won three league titles in 1962, 1964 and 1965.

Grillo finished his career as an active player in 1966 when he was 37. Four years later, he began his career as the coach of Boca Juniors' youth divisions. Some players coached by Grillo during their first years were Roberto Mouzo, Oscar Ruggeri, Enrique Vidallé, Hugo Perotti, Marcelo Trobbiani and Alberto Tarantini, amongst others. Grillo worked there until 31 December 1986, when the club decided not to continue working with him. In 1997, he went into depression and finally died on 18 June 1998.

== Honours ==
Milan

- Serie A: 1958–59
- European Cup runner-up: 1958

Boca Juniors

- Primera División: 1962, 1964, 1965
- Copa Libertadores runner-up: 1963

Argentina

- Copa América: 1955
