= Ernesto Cucchiaroni =

Argentine footballer (1927–1971)

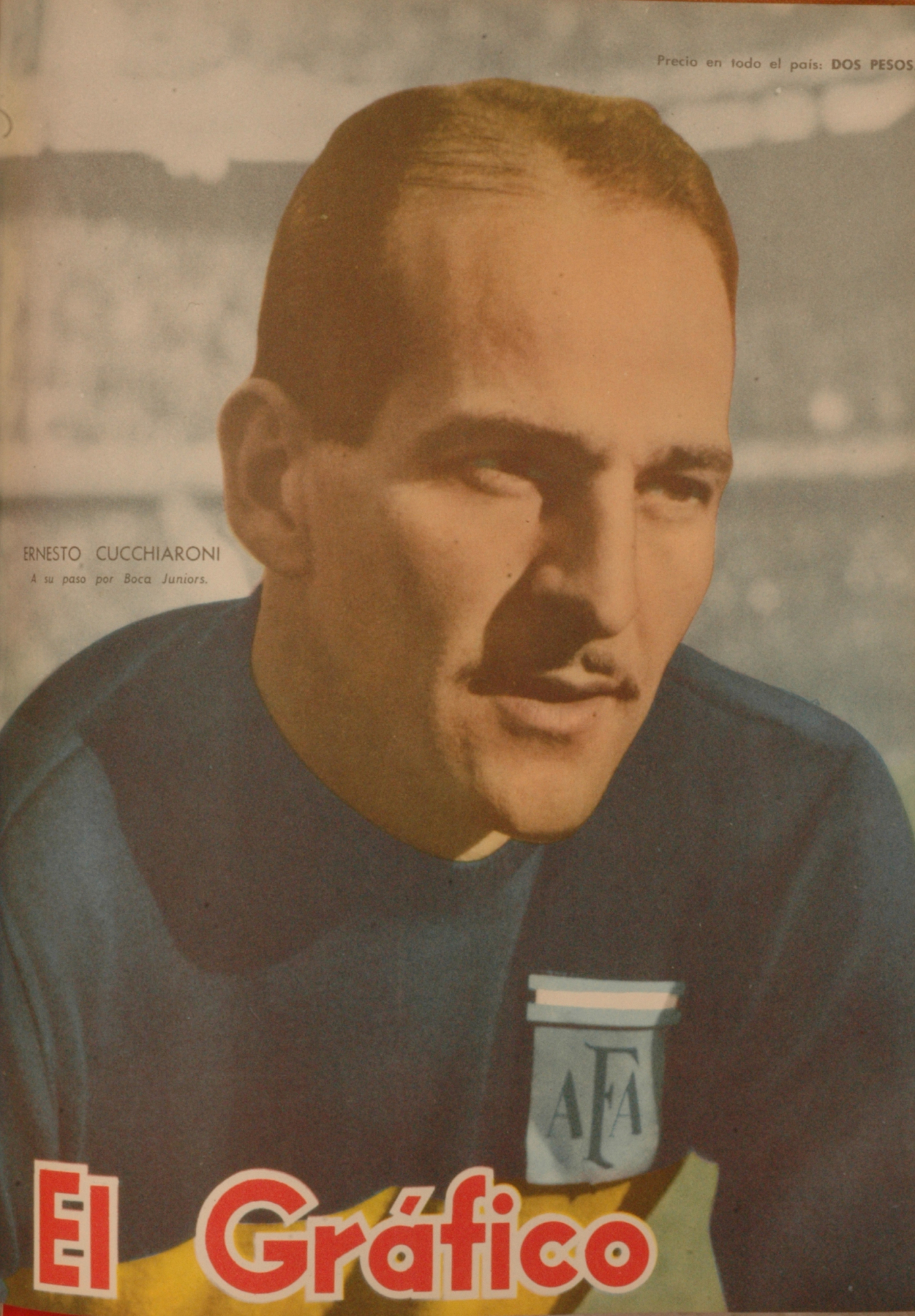
- Cuchiaroni with Boca Juniors

Personal information
- Full name: Ernesto Bernardo Cucchiaroni
- Date of birth: 16 November 1927
- Place of birth: Posadas, Misiones, Argentina
- Date of death: 4 July 1971 (aged 43)
- Height: 1.69 m (5 ft 7 in)
- Position: Left winger

Senior career*
Years	Team	Apps	(Gls)
?–1949	Rivadavia de Lincoln		
1949–1954	Tigre		
1955–1956	Boca Juniors	44	(16)
1956–1958	A.C. Milan	41	(7)
1958–1963	Sampdoria	138	(40)

International career
1955–1956	Argentina	11	(0)
- * Club domestic league appearances and goals

Ernesto Bernardo "control " Cucchiaroni (16 November 1927 – 4 July 1971) was an Argentine footballer who played as a left winger in Argentina for Rivadavia de Lincoln, Tigre and Boca Juniors and in Italy for Sampdoria and A.C. Milan. With Milan, he won the 1956–57 Serie A. At international level, he won the 1955 South American Championship with the Argentina national team.

== Club career ==
Cucchiaroni was born in the Argentine city of Posadas. He started his playing career with Rivadavia de Lincoln before leaving at the age of 22 to join Club Atlético Tigre.

After spending five years at Tigre, Cucchiaroni moved to Boca Juniors where he spent a further two years playing under Jaime Sarlanga, and Mario Fortunato in 1955 and 1956 respectively.

It wasn't long before Cucchiaroni caught the eyes of overseas interest and in 1956, he was picked up by Italian giants A.C. Milan. His first season for Milan was fairly productive, doing 27 league appearances and 4 goals whilst also playing a further 5 games (scoring once) in the European Champion Clubs' Cup. Cucchiaroni's second season however was not so productive only appearing 13 times and scoring twice.

In June, 1958 Cucchiaroni transferred from Milan to Sampdoria where he spent the remainder of his career. He retired in June 1963 after accumulating 138 league appearances and 40 goals.

== International career ==
In 1956, Cucchiaroni was selected for Argentina in the South American Championship. Argentina went on to the final where they beat Chile 1–0. All up, Cucchiaroni made 11 appearances for the Argentina without scoring.

== Honours ==
A.C. Milan

- Serie A: 1956–57

Argentina

- Copa América: 1955
