= Sauce de Luna =

Coordinates: 31°14′S 59°13′W

- Municipality and village
- Interactive map of Sauce de Luna
- Country: Argentina
- Province: Entre Ríos Province
- Time zone: UTC−3 (ART)

Sauce de Luna is a village and municipality in Entre Ríos Province in north-eastern Argentina.
