= Athletic Bilbao in European football =

Spanish club in European football

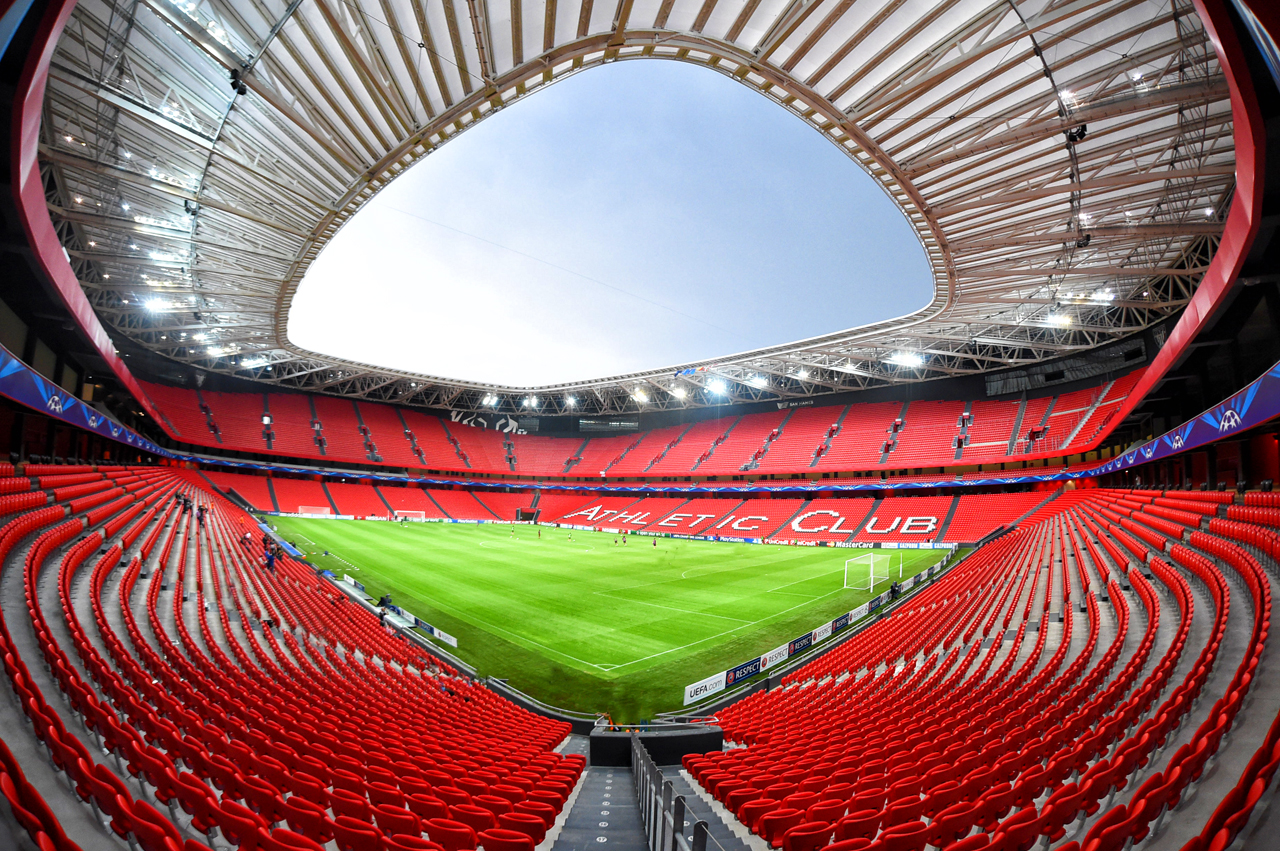
- San Mamés prior to a UEFA Champions League fixture, 2014
- Club: Athletic Club
- Seasons played: 34
- Most appearances: Óscar de Marcos (77)
- Top scorer: Aritz Aduriz (34)
- First entry: 1956–57 European Cup
- Latest entry: 2025–26 UEFA Champions League (club season details)

Titles
- Champions League: 0 (Best: Quarter-final)
- Europa League: 0 (Best: Runners-up twice)
- Cup Winners' Cup: 0 (Best: Second round)
- Inter-Cities Fairs Cup: 0 (Best: Quarter-final three times)

Athletic Bilbao, a professional football club based in Bilbao (Biscay, Basque Country, Spain) has competed in international tournaments as representatives of La Liga since 1956. The club's first entry into an official competition organised by the Union of European Football Associations (UEFA) was the European Cup in 1956–57 (its second edition) as national champions; they reached the quarter-finals.

Athletic have yet to win a continental trophy in 33 attempts, up to and including the 2024–25 season. They finished runners-up in the two-legged 1977 UEFA Cup final, losing to Juventus on the away goals rule, and in the 2012 UEFA Europa League final, losing 3–0 to compatriots Atlético Madrid. They progressed to a third semi-final in the 2024–25 UEFA Europa League but did not reach the final which was due to be played at their own stadium. The club have competed in the group stages of the UEFA Champions League three times, in 1998–99, 2014–15 and 2025–26, without qualifying for the next phase on any occasion.

Striker Aritz Aduriz contributed 34 European goals for the club over a six-year spell from 2012 to 2018, winning the Europa League's top scorer award twice (one shared). The player with the most appearances, full-back Óscar de Marcos (77 matches), was also heavily involved during that period as well as in the 2011–12 and 2024–25 Europa League runs.

== History ==
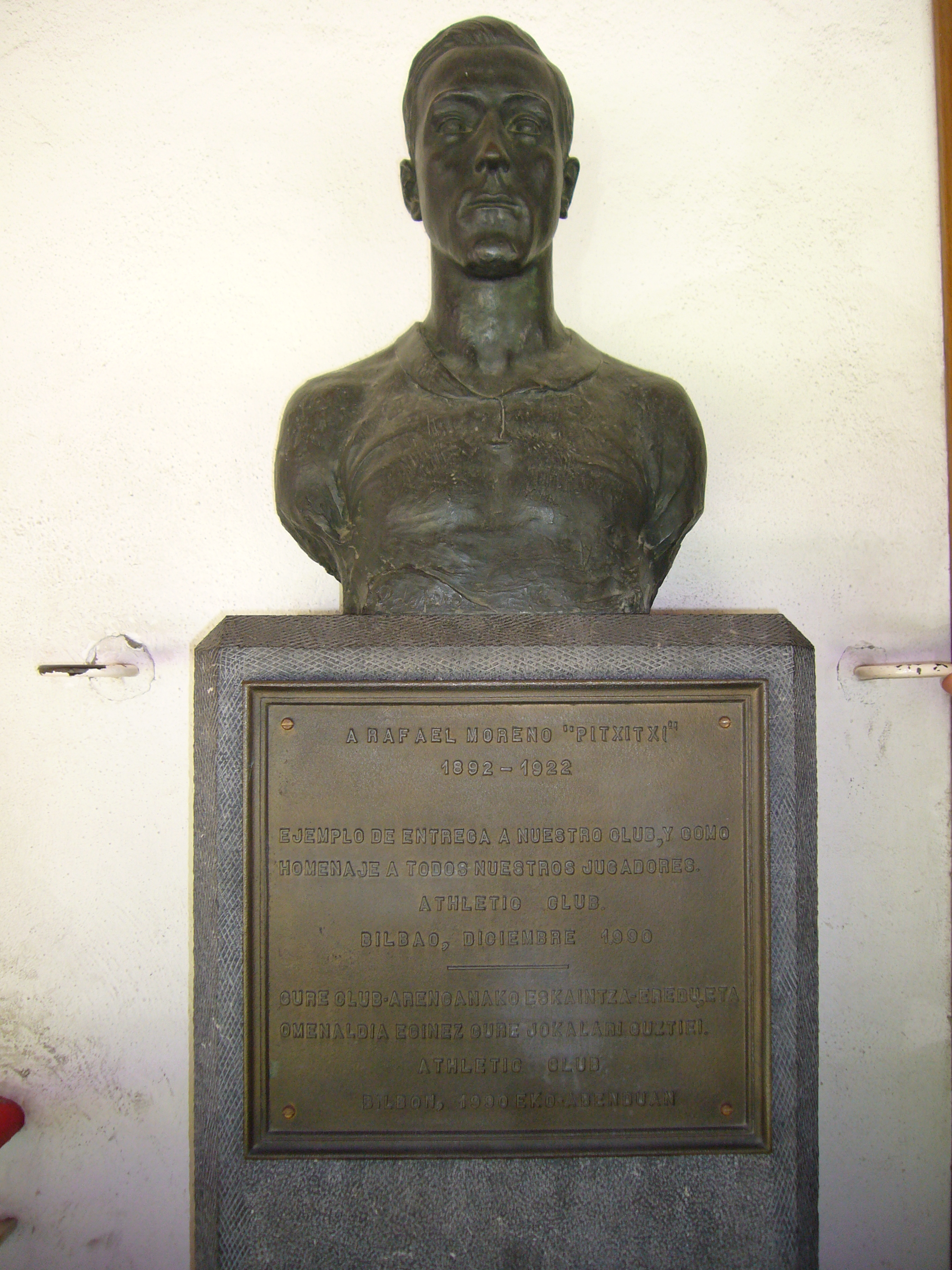
Bust of Pichichi at old San Mamés

From 1941 until 1975, the club was known as Atlético de Bilbao following a decree from the ruling regime of the period that foreign words should not be used – the Athletic name, adopted at the turn of the 20th century, reflected English connections to football in the area. Therefore, any references to Atlético Bilbao in matches during the period correctly reflect the official title at the time.

=== Traditions ===
It is traditional for the captains of teams visiting Athletic's stadium for the first time to present a bouquet of flowers to a bust of the club's 1920s star Pichichi. Since it is rare for Athletic to encounter new opponents in domestic football, most of these brief pre-match ceremonies take place prior to European ties.

=== 1950s: The Magyars and the Babes ===
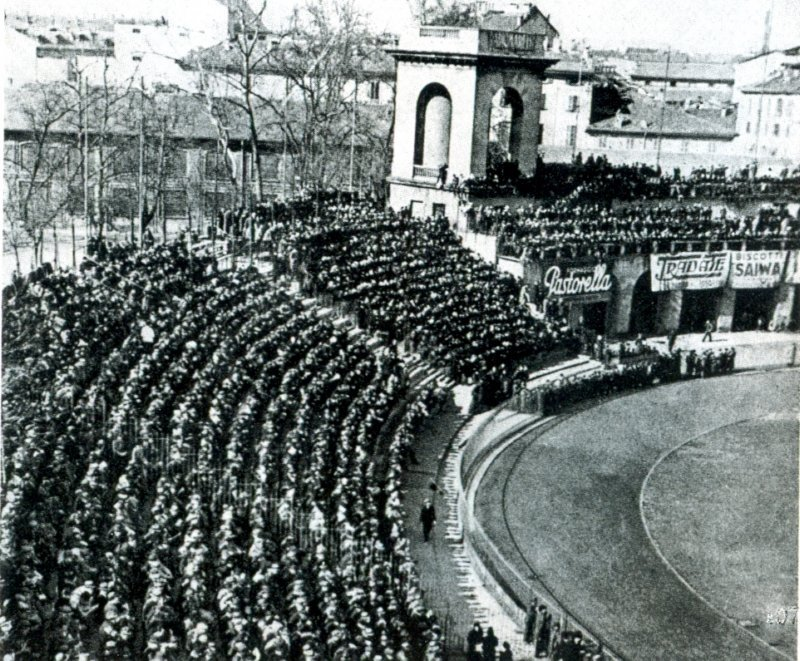
Athletic's first matches in Europe in the Latin Cup were played in Milan's Arena Civica

Athletic's first experience of European competition was the non-UEFA Latin Cup held at the end of the 1955–56 season in which they were champions of Spain; in the small four-team tournament held in Milan, the Lions finished as runners-up to A.C. Milan. The competition ended in 1957 and has become relatively obscure although was taken seriously at the time.

Winning the domestic league also granted Athletic entry to the European Cup, the first edition of which had been won by Spanish rivals Real Madrid. During the 1956–57 campaign, They defeated FC Porto in the opening round and were then drawn against Budapest Honvéd of Hungary at a significant point in that nation's history. Before the first leg of their tie – originally scheduled for Budapest – had been played, the Hungarian Revolution of 1956 began. The Honvéd players, who formed the backbone of the 'Mighty Magyars' international side, were already out of the country, but their families remained at home amidst the chaos of the uprising. The legs were switched, with Athletic winning narrowly 3–2 in Bilbao.

The second leg was eventually played a month later in Brussels after Honvéd, unwilling to return to Hungary, took part in several exhibition matches around the continent. That return ended in a 3–3 draw with Athletic progressing 6–5, although Honvéd played a portion of the match with ten men after the goalkeeper was injured; their international winger Zoltán Czibor took his place between the posts. Honvéd continued to play tour matches across Europe and in South America for some time, until most returned home. Czibor, Sándor Kocsis and captain Ferenc Puskás did not go back and had to serve bans for their defection before they were able to play for their new clubs – Athletic's domestic rivals FC Barcelona and Real Madrid. Honvéd would not be a major force in the game again.

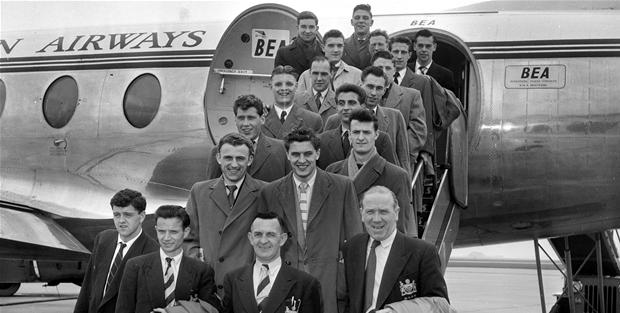
The Busby Babes team, pictured about two years before their tie in Bilbao

Athletic's next opponents were the young Manchester United squad known as the Busby Babes, who progressed after another battle ending 6–5. After 85 minutes of the first leg in Bilbao, the home side led 5–2 before the Red Devils scored a third goal, giving themselves a more achievable target in Manchester, and it was also with five minutes remaining in the return that they found the decisive goal to win 3–0. The United players had helped to clear snow off their aeroplane at Bilbao Airport to enable them to fly home after the first leg; exactly a year after their win over Athletic, the English club was decimated in the Munich air disaster which involved their plane failing on take-off in wintery conditions.

=== 1960s and early 1970s: Diminishing returns ===
It would be nine years before Athletic played in Europe again, although a Copa del Generalisimo win in 1958 and three league finishes in the top five (1958–59, 1959–60, 1961–62) achieved in the period would have been sufficient to qualify in later eras.

In the 1964–65 Inter-Cities Fairs Cup tournament, the club progressed through two early rounds before meeting Scotland's Dunfermline Athletic. Both won their home leg 1–0 necessitating a playoff in Bilbao, won 2–1 by the home side with a late Fidel Uriarte goal. The quarter–final opponents were another Hungarian side, Ferencváros, and the tie finished 3–3 on aggregate; again a playoff was required, which took place in Budapest, and Ferencváros won 3–0 on their way to the trophy, beating Juventus in the final.

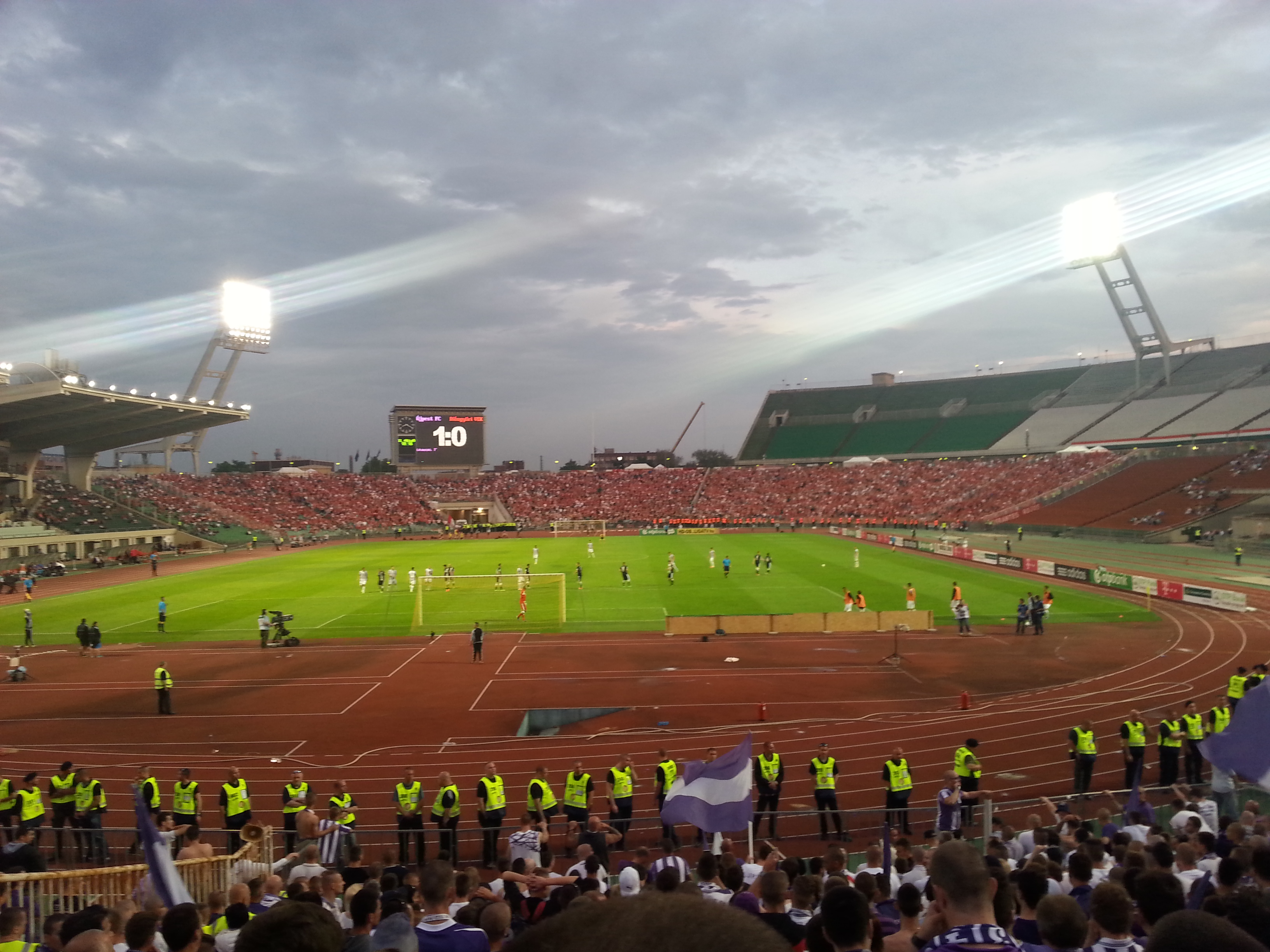
Athletic have played six matches in Hungary, including four against Ferencváros at the Nepstadion, losing them all

Athletic's next entry into Europe in the 1966–67 Inter-Cities Fairs Cup was a short unhappy venture, as Red Star Belgrade won 5–0 in the first round, first leg match in Belgrade, which remains the club's heaviest European defeat. Prior to the match, the Yugoslav side's manager had underplayed his team's strength, stating "The best we can hope for is a draw". A 2–0 win at home could not retrieve the situation for Athletic. Red Star did not have much impact on the competition, losing to another Spanish club Valencia in the next round, but their domestic rivals Dinamo Zagreb went on to win the cup.

In the following campaign, a win over Denmark's Frem was rewarded with a cross-border meeting with Girondins Bordeaux, the shortest-ever away journey at 257km. That tie was successfully passed, but after receiving a bye to the quarter-finals through the luck of the draw, Athletic's next opponents were Ferencváros who once more proved too strong, despite enduring a miserable journey from Budapest to the Basque Country for the second leg; the Hungarians would again reach the final, this time losing to Leeds United.

A late goal by Emlyn Hughes at Anfield sent Athletic's 1968–69 Fairs Cup first round tie with Liverpool into extra time. (with this tiebreak method now preferred to a deciding match), When that did not provide a winner, the toss of a coin (or specifically picking the correct colour of card the referee was holding, from a choice of red or green) was employed for the only time in the club's European matches, with luck favouring the Lions. They overcame their first German opponents Eintracht Frankfurt through a spectacular volley from teenage defender José María Igartua and advanced to the quarter-finals to face Rangers, where two late goals in the first leg at Ibrox proved decisive as the 4–1 loss, including a strike by Alex Ferguson who had been in the Dunfermline side narrowly beaten four years earlier and had a goal disallowed in that tie, was only countered 2–0 at home with some good chances to score a vital third being squandered.

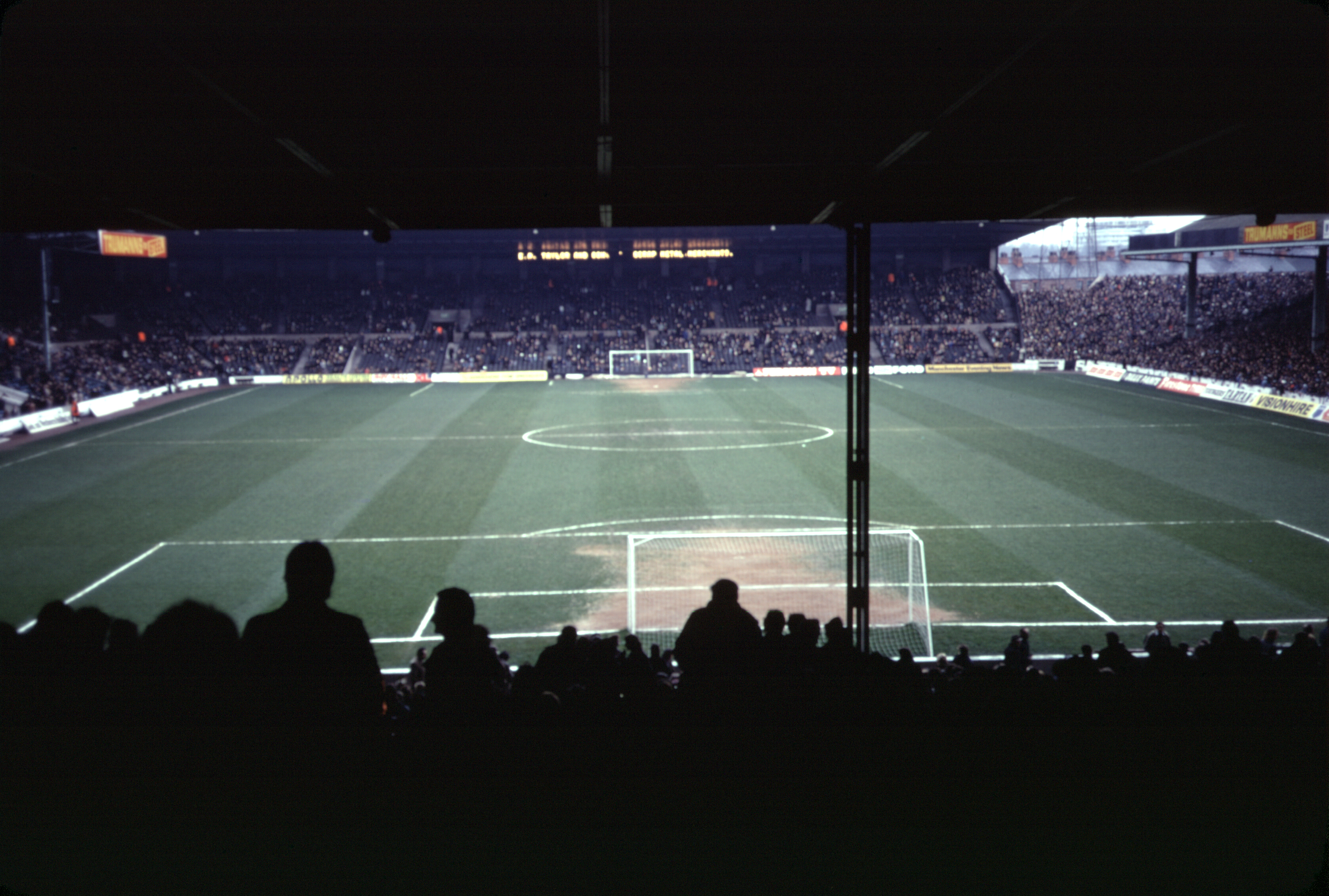
The club lost 3–0 to Manchester City at Maine Road in 1969

In 1969–70, Athletic Bilbao entered the Cup Winners' Cup for the first time as winners of the 1969 Copa del Generalísimo; they were eliminated in the opening round by eventual winners Manchester City. Athletic returned to the Fairs Cup for its final edition but again exited early, this time at the hands of Sparta Prague.

The change of competition to the UEFA Cup in 1971–72 brought little upturn in fortune, as Athletic qualified (their sixth successive European campaign, the longest sequence in club history) but lost to Eintracht Braunschweig after beating Southampton.

After a year's hiatus, a domestic cup win in 1973 provided entry into the 1973–74 European Cup Winners' Cup, the last time the club would enter that competition, ending after two journeys behind the Iron Curtain: Athletic were accompanied to the USSR by 1000 supporters for the goalless draw with Torpedo Moscow, but this result was followed by a heavy 3–0 defeat to Bulgaria's Beroe Stara Zagora which could not be overturned back in Bilbao.

=== Late 1970s: UEFA Cup finalists ===
The club's first major successful run to the latter stages of European competition occurred in the 1976–77 UEFA Cup under head coach and former player Koldo Aguirre. Early rounds against Újpest of Hungary and Basel of Switzerland were overcome thanks to strong home wins in the second leg. In the third round against Italians Milan, Athletic played at home first, and this time secured a strong 4–1 lead to take to Italy after scoring on 81 and 86 minutes. In the second leg at the San Siro, Milan scored a penalty with less than ten minutes remaining to lead on away goals before an even later Athletic penalty turned the tie.

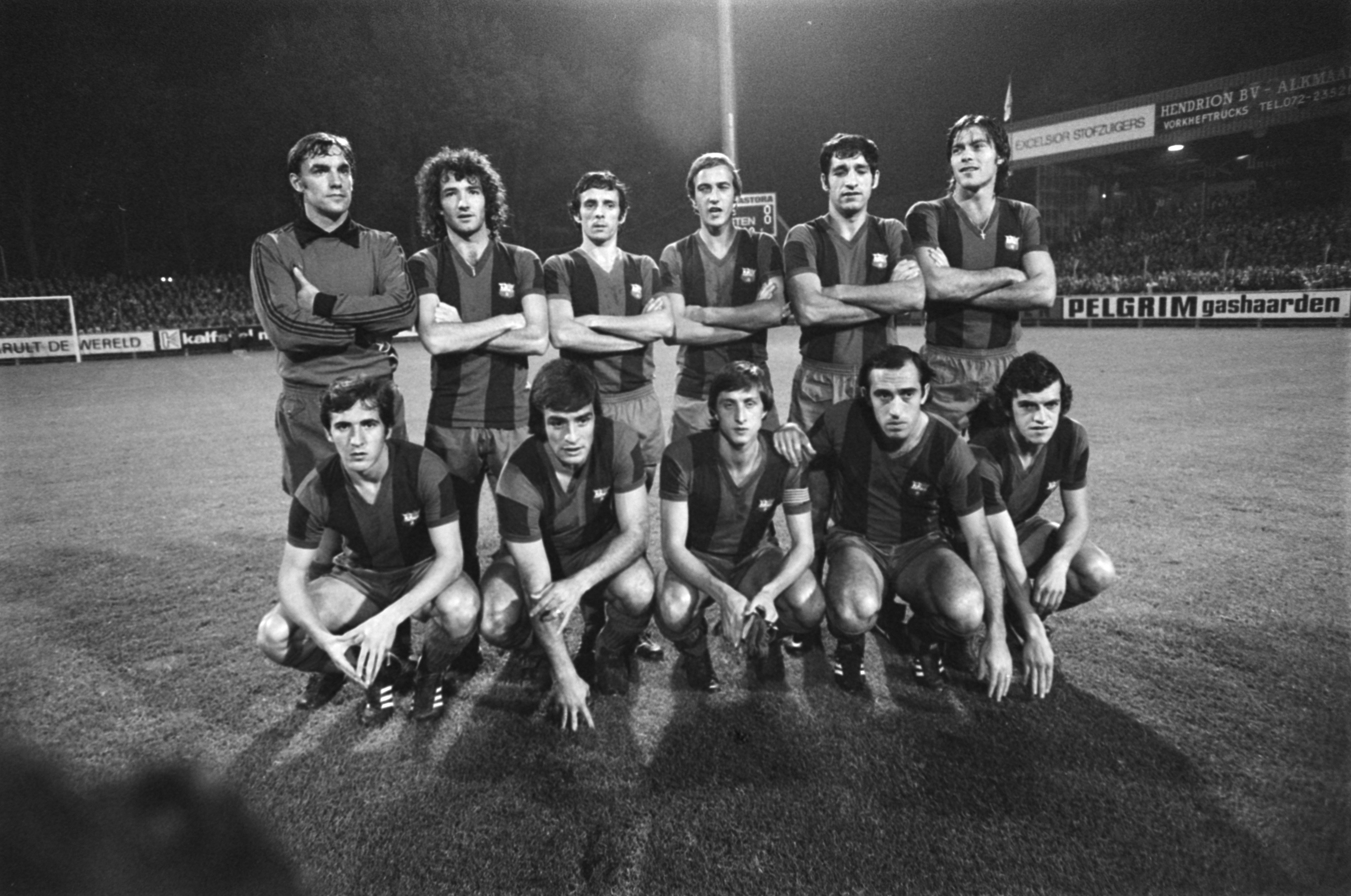
Athletic overcame Johan Cruijff and FC Barcelona during their 1976–77 UEFA Cup run

That victory over one of the continent's biggest names provided confidence in facing another: domestic rivals Barcelona. It was the first time Athletic had played another Spanish team in Europe, and the two clubs had already played both league fixtures that season, the Catalans winning 3–1 in Bilbao and the Basques claiming a 2–0 victory at the Camp Nou ten days before their UEFA Cup tie. The tie was played in an unusually friendly atmosphere due to the similar regional identity of the two clubs, whose supporters were excited by the prospect of a brighter future for their respective territories after the death of dictator General Franco and the weakening of his regime. Athletic held on for a 2–1 lead at San Mames and led by the same score by half–time in the second leg thanks to a brace from Javier Irureta, requiring Barça to score three more times in the last 45 minutes. They could only manage one, through Johan Cruijff, so the Lions qualified for the penultimate stage of a European tournament for the first time.

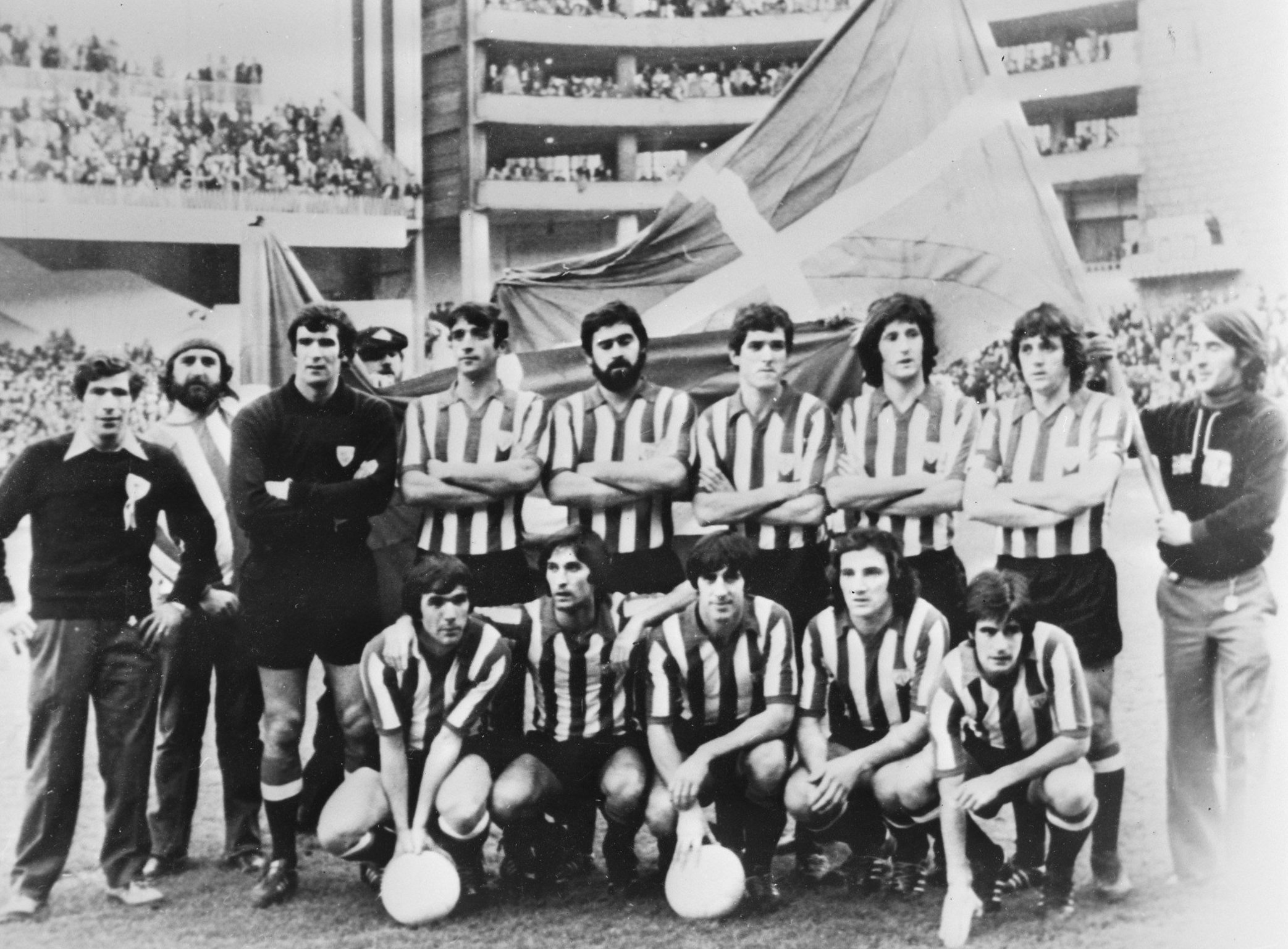
Athletic line-up with most of the 1977 UEFA Cup Final participants: Iribar, Alexanko, Guisasola, Villar, Escalza, Lasa; Dani, Rojo II, Carlos, Churruca, Rojo I

In the semi-final tie, against Belgians R.W.D. Molenbeek, a 1–1 draw was achieved in a tough contest in Brussels before a 0–0 draw in Bilbao was sufficient to progress to the two–legged final against another Serie A club, Juventus. Athletic's veteran goalkeeper José Ángel Iribar would face his 'twin', the Italian national custodian Dino Zoff (the two were of similar age, height and appearance).

Both clubs fielded teams of a single nationality in the showpiece first leg at the Stadio Comunale on 4 May before a 75,000 crowd, with the only goal scored by the hosts' Marco Tardelli. In the return on 18 May, an early away goal by Juve's Roberto Bettega left Athletic with a tough task to score three against the side that were about to be crowned Serie A champions, had only conceded 20 goals in the league and given up just one to each of their UEFA Cup opponents that season. Athletic quickly equalised on the night through Irureta, but could not find another goal until Carlos scored the second on 78 minutes. A frantic last portion of the match failed to produce the vital third goal, the tie finished 2–2 and Juventus claimed their first European trophy on the away goals rule. A few weeks later, Athletic suffered further disappointment when they lost the 1977 Copa del Rey Final in a penalty shoot–out to Real Betis.

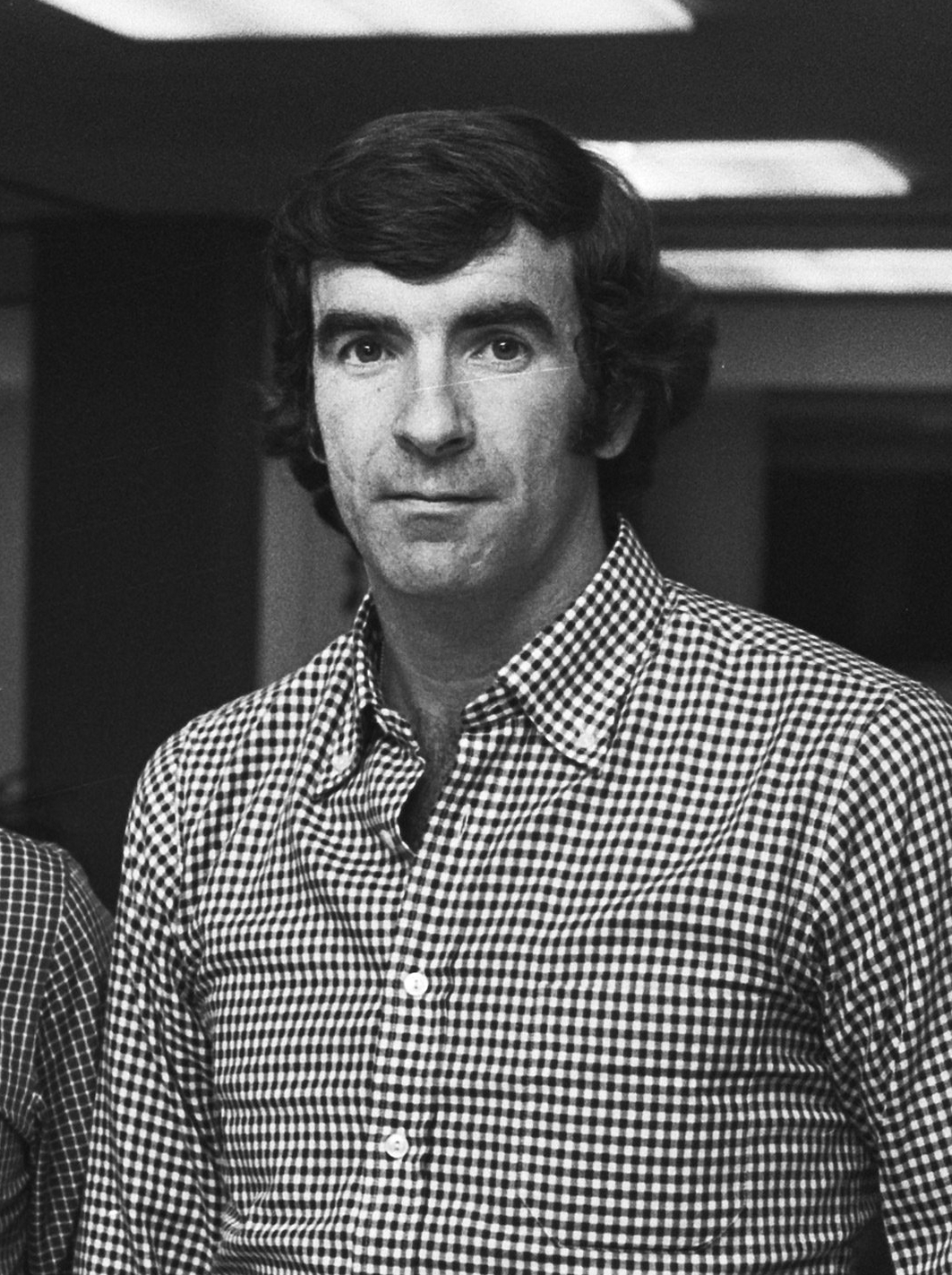
José Ángel Iribar appeared in 55 European matches and was captain in the 1977 UEFA Cup Final

Results thereafter were not as impressive: the following season began in familiar circumstances as Athletic defeated opponents from Switzerland (Servette) and Hungary (Újpest again, requiring extra time to progress) before falling to Aston Villa, and the 1978–79 UEFA Cup run ended even sooner as Ajax overturned a two-goal deficit to win the first–round tie with Søren Lerby scoring the decisive goal with two minutes remaining. It was a fair outcome, as the second of Athletic's scores in Bilbao should not have been awarded: Juan Carlos Vidal's shot struck the outside of the supporting stanchion and rebounded onto the field of play in a similar manner to the legitimate goal earlier in the match, and was mistakenly given by the referee.

=== 1980s: No joy in European Cup ===
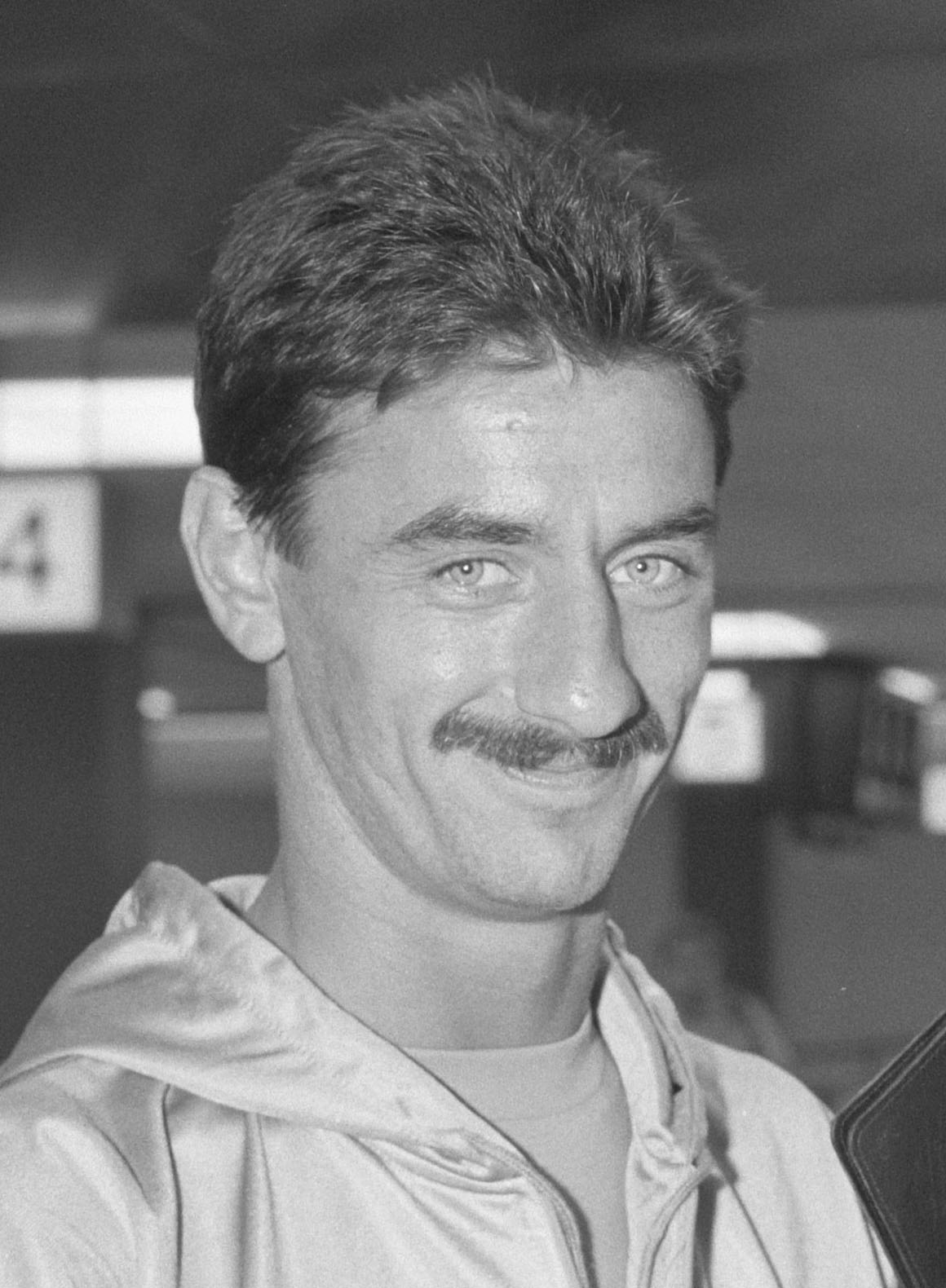
A single goal by Ian Rush enabled Liverpool to eliminate Athletic from the 1983–84 European Cup

After three years with no European football for Athletic, in the 1982–83 UEFA Cup it was the Budapest team Ferencváros who once again ended their participation. It was the third time they had been drawn together and Athletic had lost on every occasion.

In 1983, Athletic won the Spanish league 27 years after their last triumph, so that autumn they re-entered the Champions' Cup for the first time in a generation. After seeing off Lech Poznan, Javier Clemente's side faced Liverpool, winners in three of the past seven seasons. A goalless draw in England appeared to bode well for the return, but Liverpool showed their strength by winning 1–0 at San Mamés through Ian Rush, the first opponent to win there since 1968 (22 matches). The Reds would go on to win the final in Rome.

Athletic retained their league title and added the domestic cup in 1983–84, but the subsequent European Cup campaign was disappointingly brief, with Bordeaux prevailing in the first round tie despite Athletic only needing a single goal to win at home and progress on away goals; two goals home were disallowed and the crowd threw missiles at the referee in frustration. The small consolation was that the French champions proved their mettle by reaching the semi-finals where they came close to beating the eventual winners Juventus.

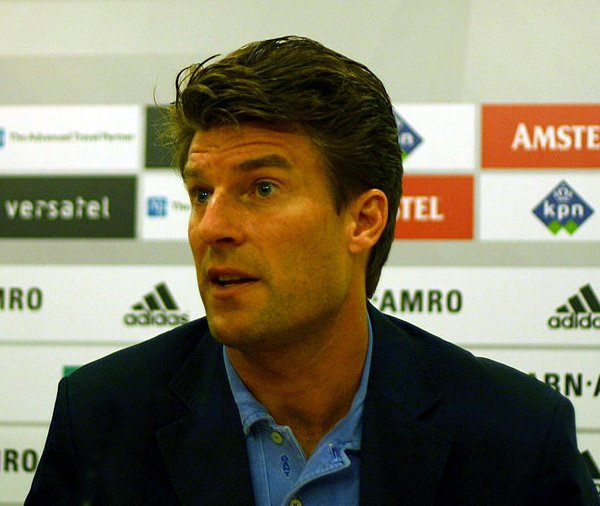
Michael Laudrup scored three as Juventus beat Athletic 7–4 on aggregate in 1988

Unremarkable UEFA cup campaigns would follow, with defeats to Sporting CP (losing 3–0 in the second leg after a run of five straight wins in earlier matches against Beşiktaş J.K. and RFC Liège in the first two rounds) in 1985–86 UEFA Cup and Beveren, with the latter campaign in 1986–87 the last of five consecutive seasons of qualifying for Europe. In 1988, Athletic returned to Turin and the Stadio Comunale to face Juventus once more, this time losing heavily 5–1. Michael Laudrup, who scored two of the goals, also opened the scoring in Bilbao to all but end the tie as a contest, although Athletic did come to within two goals of levelling the aggregate before having to settle for a 3–2 win on the night.

=== 1990s: Italian and English trips, Champions League ===
After five seasons without qualifying, Athletic returned to European football with enthusiasm in the 1994–95 UEFA Cup, eliminating Anorthosis by overcoming a two-goal first leg deficit and English league leaders Newcastle United in a tie memorable for another comeback in the first leg (reducing arrears from 3–0 at St James' Park by scoring twice in the last 20 minutes) and for the positive interaction between the two groups of supporters, before losing out to Parma, who would go on to lift the trophy, in another closely–fought contest over the two legs. In their next qualification in 1997 the situation was reversed, with Athletic overcoming an Italian opponent – Sampdoria – before losing to an English rival: Aston Villa.

The 1997–98 domestic season saw Athletic finish as runners-up, providing a qualification route to the 1998–99 UEFA Champions League. In the play-off round, a lengthy journey to Georgia was rewarded with a narrow win over Dinamo Tbilisi on away goals to make it into the group stage. Facing Juventus once again (finalists in the previous three editions), Athletic managed to avoid defeat to the Bianconeri but lost away matches to Rosenborg and Galatasaray to finish bottom of a very tight section. It would be their last European involvement for six years.

=== 2000s: Group stage experience ===
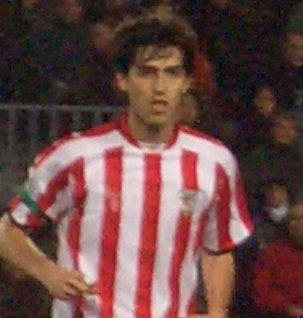
Andoni Iraola was a scorer in Athletic's biggest European win, 7–1 away to Standard Liège

Athletic, coached by Ernesto Valverde, made a comeback to continental competition in the 2004–05 UEFA Cup, their only participation in that tournament's five-club group stage involving one match against each opponent. Revenge for the defeat a decade earlier was achieved with a home win over Parma in the opening fixture, and progression to the next stage was achieved in style by defeating Standard Liège 7–1 in Belgium, the club's biggest-ever win in Europe (Santiago Ezquerro scoring three). However, these positive results proved to be a false dawn as an underwhelming loss in the first knockout round to an Austria Wien side inspired by Libor Sionko followed. In the aftermath of the defeat, Valverde announced he would be leaving the club at the season's end after disputes with the hierarchy.

A few months after the Austria defeat, Athletic lost a domestic cup semi-final on penalties at San Mamés, again to Betis (see 1977), and lost on penalties in the summer in their sole entry to the early-season Intertoto Cup (having declined previous invitations) following a 9th-place finish in the league. In perhaps their most ignominious early exit, they were eliminated from Europe after a playing just a single two-legged tie, losing 1-0 in both games to Romania's CFR Cluj. The result came in the wake of the departure of two important players – Ezquerro to Barcelona and Asier del Horno to Chelsea, and set the tone for a disappointing domestic season in which the club narrowly avoided relegation.

The club's next entry, into the re-branded UEFA Europa League in 2009 (having lost the previous season's Cup final to Barcelona), involved the setting of new club records, as 16-year-old Iker Muniain became the club's youngest player in a European match in the first leg defeat to Young Boys, then came off the bench and scored the goal which saw Athletic progress on away goals in the return in Switzerland. Despite failing to win at home again in the next round, a long journey north to the Arctic Circle was rewarded with a narrow aggregate victory over Tromsø and qualification to the group stage, where two wins over Austria Wien (the away leg interrupted by a pitch invasion by local right-wing hooligans) were mitigated by a pair of defeats to Werder Bremen (the only German opponent to win in Bilbao). In the first knockout round, Athletic endured their worst aggregate losing margin in a 1–5 reverse to Anderlecht, led by another 16-year-old forward, Romelu Lukaku, while more violent incidents involving supporters occurred at San Mamés in the first leg and in the streets of Brussels prior to the second leg.

=== Early 2010s: Europa League final ===
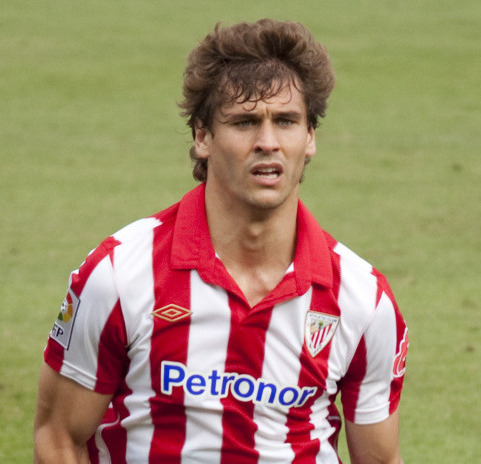
Fernando Llorente scored seven times in the 2011–12 UEFA Europa League run

Marcelo Bielsa became Athletic coach in 2011, with his first competitive fixture a Europa League tie at home to Trabzonspor which ended 0–0. A difficult second leg on the Black Sea coast was in prospect, but this was cancelled when Fenerbahçe were expelled from the Champions League, with Trabzonspor taking the place in that competition and Athletic progressing in the Europa League by default. The club took full advantage of that piece of good fortune, winning the group ahead of Paris Saint-Germain before eliminating Lokomotiv Moscow in the last 32.

Athletic were then drawn against Manchester United and won 3–2 in the first leg at Old Trafford, going on to knock the three-time European champions out of the tournament with a 2–1 victory at home (a long-awaited 'revenge' win from 1957). Fernando Llorente and Óscar de Marcos both scored in each leg of the tie, with the manner of their performances described as "a footballing lesson" in the media.

In the quarter-final, they travelled to Schalke 04 of Germany and won the first leg 4–2, despite being 2–1 down on 72 minutes after a Raúl brace. The sides drew 2–2 in the second leg, allowing Athletic to progress to the semi-final against Sporting CP. A few hours after the match in Bilbao, an incident of disorder occurred near the stadium, during which Athletic supporter Iñigo Cabacas was shot in the head with a 'Flash-ball' fired by a member of the Ertzaintza police service and later died. Five years later, charges were brought against officers commanding the vehicles that attended the scene, with a trial date set for October 2018.

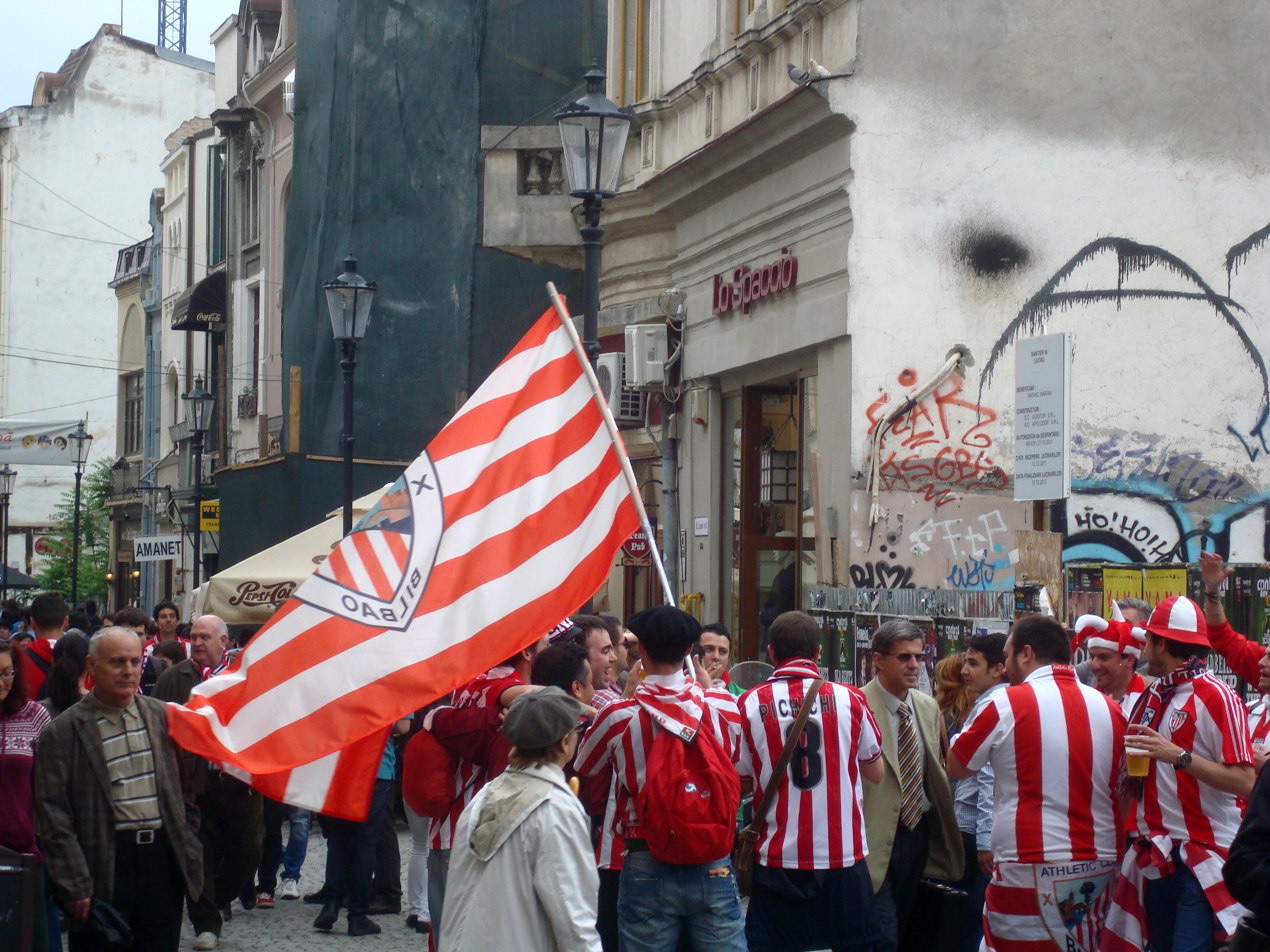
Athletic Bilbao fans in Bucharest before the Europa League final

Athletic lost the semi-final first leg in Portugal 2–1 after initially taking the lead through Jon Aurtenetxe, but prevailed 3–1 at home with goals from Markel Susaeta, Ibai Gómez and the winner by Llorente in the 89th minute in front of a fervent home crowd to edge into the final in Bucharest, 4–3 on aggregate; Bielsa's adventurous tactics led to 28 goals being scored and 20 conceded across the six group games and eight knockout matches during the run. Llorente scored seven times, while Muniain and Susaeta got five each.

The 2012 UEFA Europa League Final at the Arena Nationala proved a step too far for Athletic as they lost 3–0 to Spanish rivals Atlético Madrid (formed a century earlier by fans of Athletic as an offshoot of the original Bilbao club), The two clubs had shared league wins during the season, but on the day Atlético were inspired by the forward play of Radamel Falcao and won comfortably. A group of supporters had a double disappointment as they charted a flight to the wrong destination, mistaking Budapest for Bucharest. In an unwelcome echo of 1977, Athletic followed up their European final defeat with a loss in the 2012 Copa del Rey Final, again by a 3–0 scoreline.

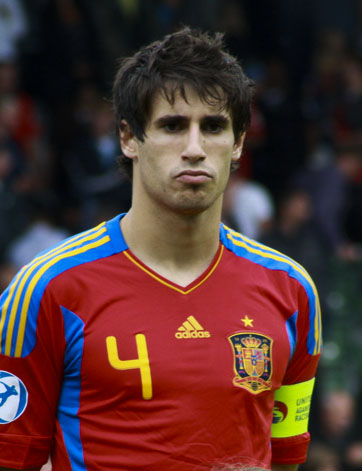
After the 2012 campaign, Javi Martínez moved to Bayern Munich and soon won the Champions League

The team did not break up entirely following the 2012 campaign. The three most prominent players who did depart all won European medals in the subsequent years: Javi Martínez (Champions League with Bayern Munich in 2013), Fernando Llorente (Europa League with Sevilla in 2016, having lost a Champions League final with Juventus twelve months earlier) and Ander Herrera (Europa League with Manchester United in 2017).

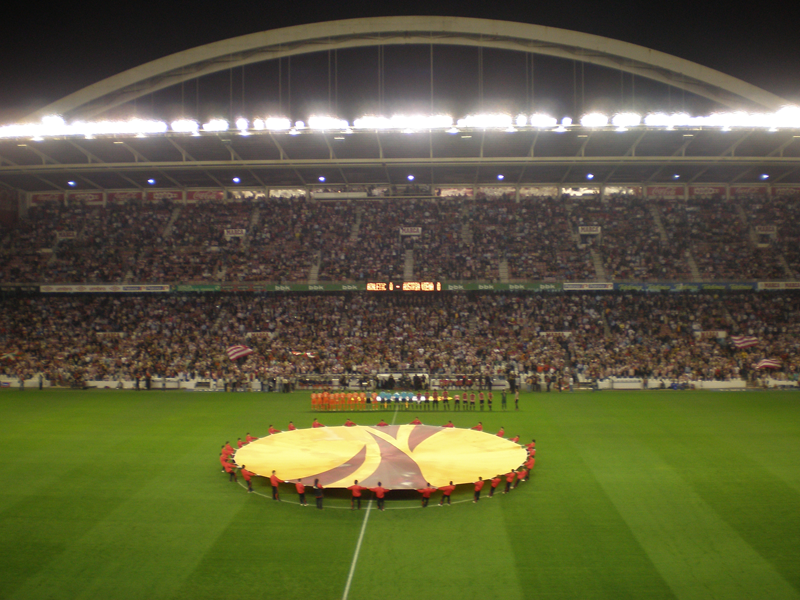
Athletic lost only 6 of 76 European matches at the old San Mamés stadium

As runners-up to Champions League qualifiers Barcelona, Athletic made an immediate return to the Europa League in 2012–13. The qualifying rounds saw the team achieve both their biggest ever home win (6–0) against Finland's HJK, and their highest aggregate margin of victory – the second leg finished 3–3 for a six-goal difference. The group stage was reached, but disappointing results, including two defeats to Lyon and failure to beat debutants Hapoel Ironi Kiryat Shmona of Israel at home, led to an early exit. The final continental fixture at the original San Mamés stadium prior to its demolition was a 0–0 draw against Sparta Prague in December 2012. The club had a strong home record at the century-old venue, losing only six times in 76 (Note: This includes one playoff match played at San Mamés, therefore one more match played at home than listed in the table below although not technically a home leg.) European matches there.

=== Late 2010s: Champions League and top scorer ===
==== 2014–15 season ====
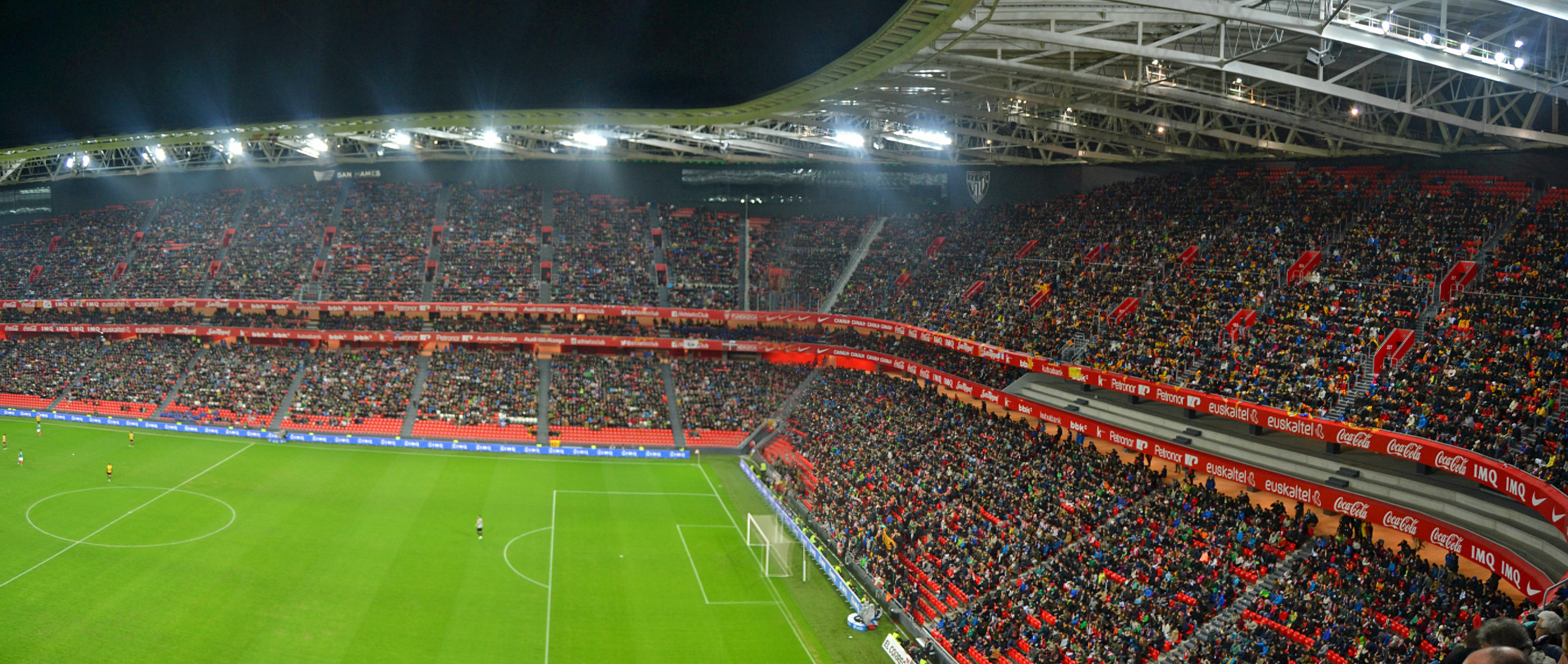
The first match at the completed new San Mamés Stadium was a win over Napoli in the Champions League in 2014

After one season in a half-built stadium and with no European football, Athletic – now coached by Valverde for a second time – finished in 4th place in the 2013–14 La Liga, allowing rare access to the Champions League qualification process. In the first match at the new San Mamés in its completed state, they defeated Napoli to reach the 2014–15 UEFA Champions League group stage. However they could only finish third behind Shakhtar Donetsk and Porto after losing to BATE Borisov (who were defeated heavily by the other teams), meaning they dropped into the Europa League, the only occasion in which the club has been involved in two European competitions in one season. Athletic were then knocked out of the lesser tournament at the Round of 32 by Torino, their first home loss to an Italian club after eight matches undefeated.

==== 2015–16 season ====
In 2015, for the third time in seven years, Athletic lost the domestic cup final to Barcelona (who also won the league title); UEFA's rules had recently changed, so they no longer qualified as runners-up. However they also finished seventh in the league, and with absence of any qualifier from the Copa del Rey, this was sufficient to enter the 2015–16 UEFA Europa League. The first qualifying round involved a trip to Baku, Azerbaijan (the furthest distance they have travelled for a European fixture at 4,309 km) where a goalless draw with Inter Baku was good enough to progress. In the group stage they topped the section, only dropping points to AZ Alkmaar, although it took two late goals from Aritz Aduriz to turn the away fixture with Augsburg on its head. Aduriz also scored in the away legs of subsequent rounds against Marseille (a volley from 35 yards) and Valencia (his former club, against whom he had already netted twice that season during league wins), and in both legs against the holders Sevilla, but there the run ended as the hosts won a penalty shootout 5–4 at the Ramón Sánchez Pizjuán Stadium to go through, eventually winning the trophy for the third consecutive year.

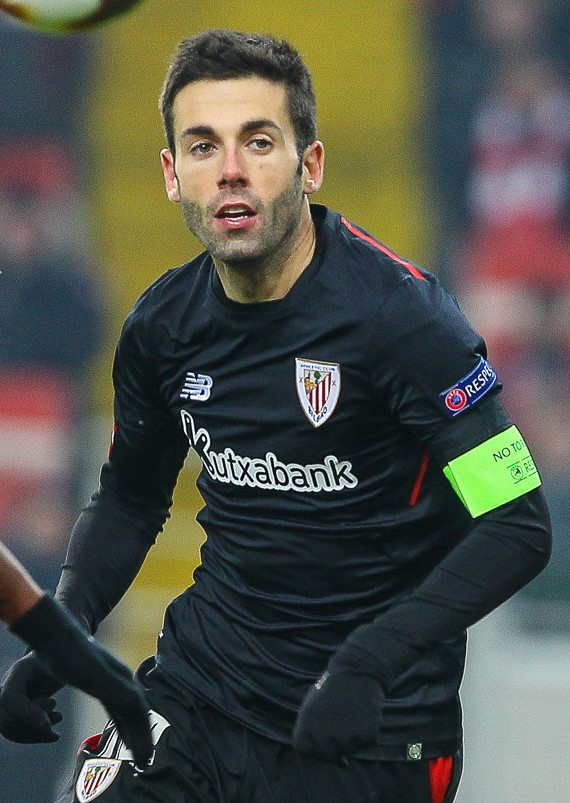
Markel Susaeta broke the Athletic European appearance record in 2016.

Aduriz finished as the competition's top scorer with 10 goals, and was named in the 'squad of the season'. Due to the early qualifying rounds played, the total of 16 matches in the campaign equalled the previous record set during 2011–12's run to the final.

==== 2016–17 season ====
After finishing the domestic season in 5th place, Athletic qualified directly for the 2016–17 UEFA Europa League group stage. They started poorly with a loss to debutants Sassuolo in a fixture that had significance for Susaeta making a record 56th continental appearance, overtaking Iribar. The campaign was recovered thanks to three home wins, including a 5–3 victory over Genk in which Aduriz scored all five goals (including three penalties), becoming the first player to accomplish this feat since the competition was rebranded as the Europa League and also setting a new club record for most goals by one player in a continental fixture. Having previously been level with Llorente on 16, those goals also took him clear as the club's top scorer in European matches. Weaker away performances were exemplified by the defeat to APOEL in the first knockout round, with a lead from the home leg overturned in Cyprus.

==== 2017–18 season ====
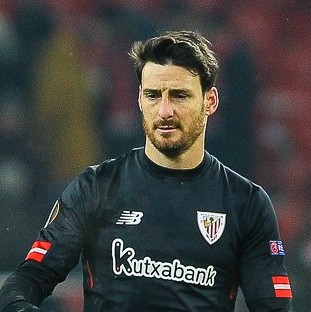
Aritz Aduriz scored 27 goals for the club across three UEFA Europa League campaigns

Under new head coach José Ángel Ziganda, Athletic scraped into a Europa League place for the 2017–18 season due to cup winners Barcelona entering the Champions League as usual, leaving a spot for the 7th-placed Lions. Preliminary rounds against strong opposition for that stage (Dinamo Bucharest and Panathinaikos) were overcome, but a poor start in the group stage – including a home defeat to Zorya Luhansk in which Muniain sustained a serious injury and a tough match in Sweden (the first tie in that country) against newcomers Östersunds FK featuring an equaliser by Iñaki Williams in the closing minutes – left Athletic with two points from three games and looking unlikely to progress. However, three victories were then achieved with more late goals by Williams, Aduriz and Raúl García, yielding 11 points in total and qualification as group winners.

The knockout draw provided a long trip to Moscow to face a fifth new opponent of that campaign, Spartak Moscow; a 3–1 first leg victory for Athletic in wintery Russia proved too much for Spartak to overturn despite their 2–1 win in Bilbao, but the second leg of the tie was overshadowed by violent clashes between home supporters and travelling Russian hooligans before kick-off; a police officer collapsed and died from a heart attack in the efforts to control the scene. Both clubs were later sanctioned and fined by UEFA.

In the Round of 16, Marseille took a 3–1 lead at the Stade Vélodrome in the first leg of the second meeting between the sides in three years. The return at San Mamés was the 100th European match held at the two incarnations of Athletic's home stadium, but the outcome did not match the occasion for the home club, as OM won 2–1 for a 5–2 aggregate victory, a margin which reflected fairly their dominance over the two matches. Aduriz, who scored in the first leg, was sent off late in the second, and again there were scenes of violence involving visiting supporters outside the stadium. It was also the first time in 50 years (Ferencváros, 1968) that Athletic had lost both legs of a knockout tie, although they had been beaten home and away in group stages three times between 2009 and 2014.

Marseille went on to finish runners-up two months later. Aduriz (now 37 years old) finished as top scorer – along with Ciro Immobile – with eight goals in the tournament proper. A poor domestic campaign meant there would be no return to Europe the following season.

==== Barren years ====
The club also failed to qualify for Europe in the next five seasons, although they did play their first competitive matches outside European territory, albeit in a domestic competition: the 2021–22 Supercopa de España was held in Riyadh, Saudi Arabia, and Athletic defeated Atlético Madrid in the semi-final but lost in the final to Real Madrid. They also took part in the previous edition of the Supercopa and won the trophy, but this was moved to the La Cartuja in Seville and played behind closed doors due to the COVID-19 pandemic in Spain.

The COVID situation also led to the two successive Copa del Rey finals for which Athletic qualified (with a Europa League place if won) being played within the space of two weeks in April 2021 in that same empty stadium; both of those matches ended in defeat, but in the case of the 2020 final against local rivals Real Sociedad the European opportunity had already been forfeited due to both clubs voluntarily delaying the event in the hope that their supporters would be able to attend once rescheduled, which was ultimately futile.

=== 2020s ===
The barren run was ended when Athletic won the Copa del Rey in 2024 to qualify for the next Europa League. They finished the league campaign in 5th that year, which would also have been sufficient to qualify via that route. They were automatically entered into the 2024–25 UEFA Europa League league phase, in its first edition using a new format with a single 36-team pool and each team playing eight fixtures against as many different opponents; Athletic were one of the lower-ranked teams in the draws due to their lack of recent coefficient points. There was an extra incentive to attempt to reach a third final in the competition, as this time it was to be held at San Mamés. From the 2012 run, captain Óscar de Marcos (at the club throughout) and Ander Herrera (back after eight years elsewhere) were in the squad, while Iker Muniain had moved on in the summer of 2024. Athletic performed strongly in the league phase, winning first-ever meetings with Slavia Prague, Ludogorets Razgrad, Elfsborg, Fenerbahçe and Viktoria Plzeň (plus a further victory over AZ Alkmaar, an opponent nine years earlier), taking a point away to Roma and losing just once, to Beşiktaş in Turkey. They finished second in the table behind Lazio on goal difference, and progressed directly to the Round of 16.

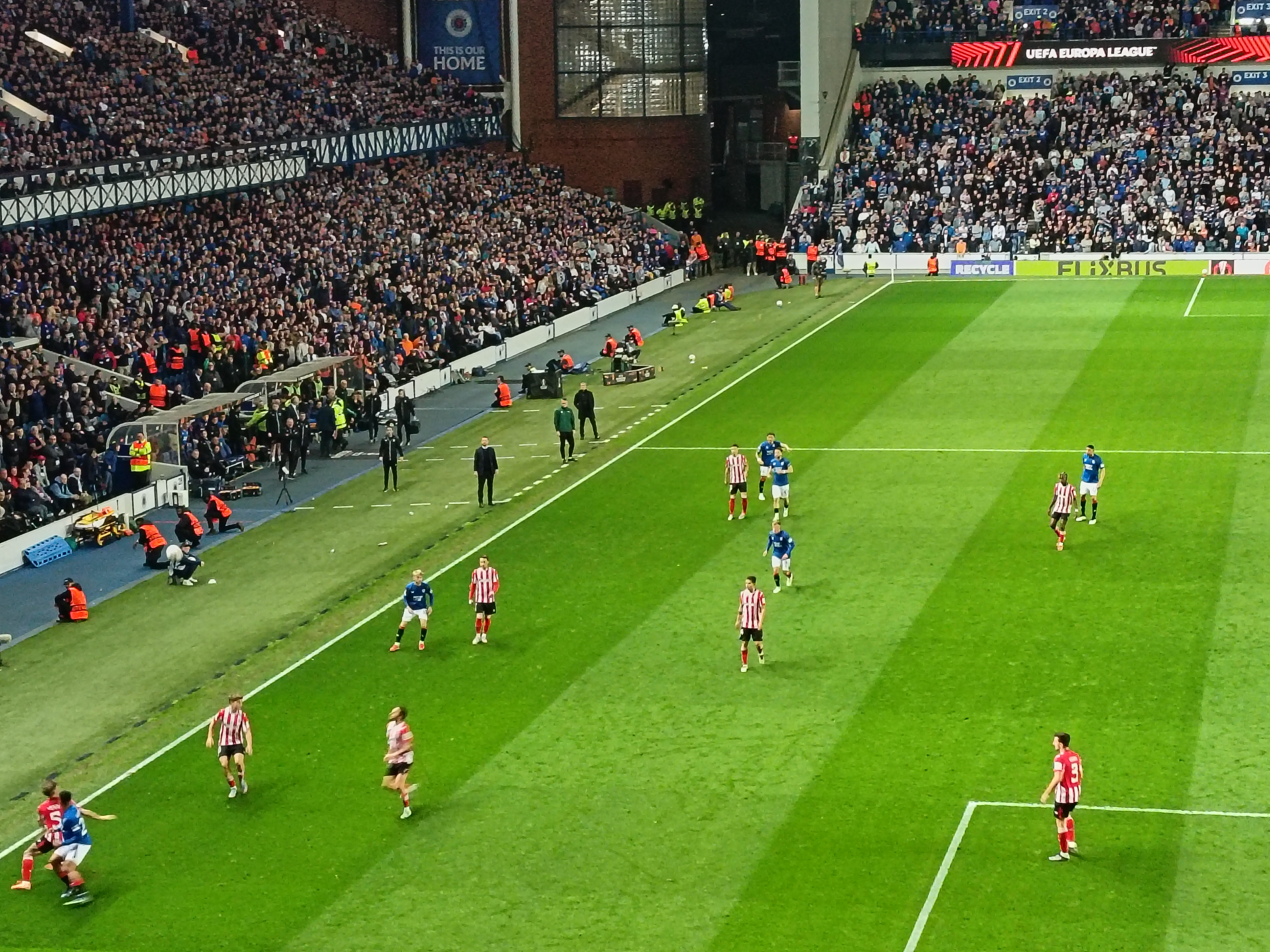
Athletic take on Rangers at Ibrox in the Europa League

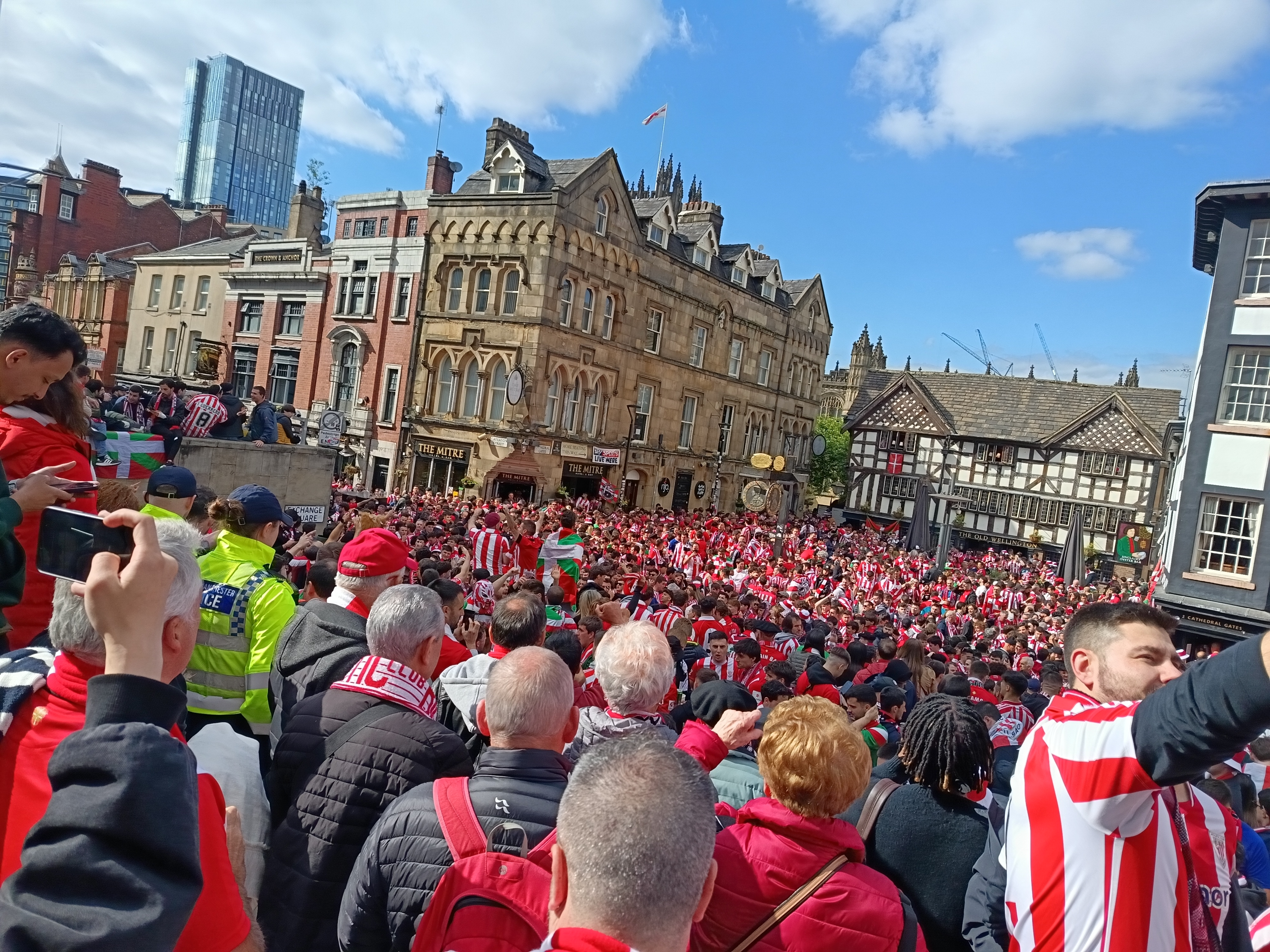
A large support followed Athletic to Manchester for the 2025 semi-final

Penalties and sendings-off via the Video Assistant Referee featured prominently in the knockout stages. A red card was shown to the away side in each leg of the Round of 16 tie, a rematch with Roma; the Italians scored late after the dismissal of Yeray Álvarez to take a lead to Bilbao, however Mats Hummels was sent off early in proceedings at San Mamés affording Athletic – and Nico Williams in particular – the space to dominate the game and score three times. In the quarter-final against Rangers, Athletic again benefitted from a man advantage after only 10 minutes but this time were stifled by the Scottish opposition in a goalless first leg at Ibrox, Liam Kelly saving a spot kick from Álex Berenguer awarded after a goal by the same player was disallowed for offside, with an earlier handball offence then 'activated' by VAR. In the second leg, another penalty was awarded and this time scored by Oihan Sancet, either side of which Rangers had two claims disregarded; a late Nico Williams header sealed a 2–0 result and a pairing with Manchester United in a repeat of the memorable 2012 tie. In the semi-final first leg at a raucous San Mamés, a lively start by Athletic was nullified by three goals in ten minutes for the visitors at the end of the first half, the second from a penalty against Dani Vivian for a tug on the shoulder of Rasmus Højlund awarded after a long VAR review. Vivian had escaped punishment for a similar incident against Rangers, but this time was shown a red card amid vehement protests, and when Bruno Fernandes converted the penalty then soon added another goal it seemed almost certain the English club (who like Athletic had also faced 10 men in the two previous rounds) would progress to the final, the Basques taking slight hope from previous dramatic comebacks, including one from United themselves to overcome Olympique Lyonnais in their quarter-final. Despite missing several key players through injury or suspension, Athletic took the lead at Old Trafford through Mikel Jauregizar and held it until the 72nd minute prior to a late collapse with the final scoreline of 4–1 (7–1 on aggregate) not fully reflecting what had been an even contest for large parts of the tie, but was nevertheless a decisive end to the home final dream. United would instead take on compatriots Tottenham Hotspur for the trophy and a lucrative place in the Champions League, albeit Athletic also qualified for that competition a week after their European disappointment via the domestic league.

Eleven years after their last experience in the elite competition, the club qualified directly for the 2025–26 UEFA Champions League league phase where they were drawn to play Arsenal, Borussia Dortmund, Qarabağ and Atalanta for the first time, along with a reverse of the previous season's meeting with Slavia Prague, an away trip to Newcastle United recalling the events of 1994, and home fixtures against two rivals from the 2011–12 run, Sporting CP and Paris Saint-Germain, the latter of whom were now reigning European champions. In an injury-hit campaign, their results were largely predictable, with a win and draw both home and away and four defeats, none by an embarrassing margin. A stalemate with PSG and an away victory over Atalanta (a rarity on Italian soil) provided a chance of progression in the last match with Sporting, but pushing forward in the final minutes with the score level left a vulnerability to counter-attack which the Lisbon team took advantage of to win 3–2 and end Athletic's hopes (they finished on 8 points, 29th of 36 teams) – the three points also propelled Sporting into the top 8 of the league along with first-placed Arsenal, while five of the other six opponents also finished in the top 24, indicating the high overall level strength the Basques had come up against.

== Club records ==
Record victory (single match):

- 7–1 away to Standard Liège, 2004
- 6–0 at home to HJK, 2012

Record aggregate margin of victory:

- 9–3 over HJK, 2012

Worst defeat (single match):

- 0–5 away to Red Star Belgrade, 1966

Record aggregate margin of defeat:

- 1–7 to Manchester United, 2025

Most frequently played opponent:

- Ferencváros, seven matches;
- Juventus, six matches
- Manchester United, six matches

Most-played opponent nationality:

- Italy, 23 matches involving eight clubs

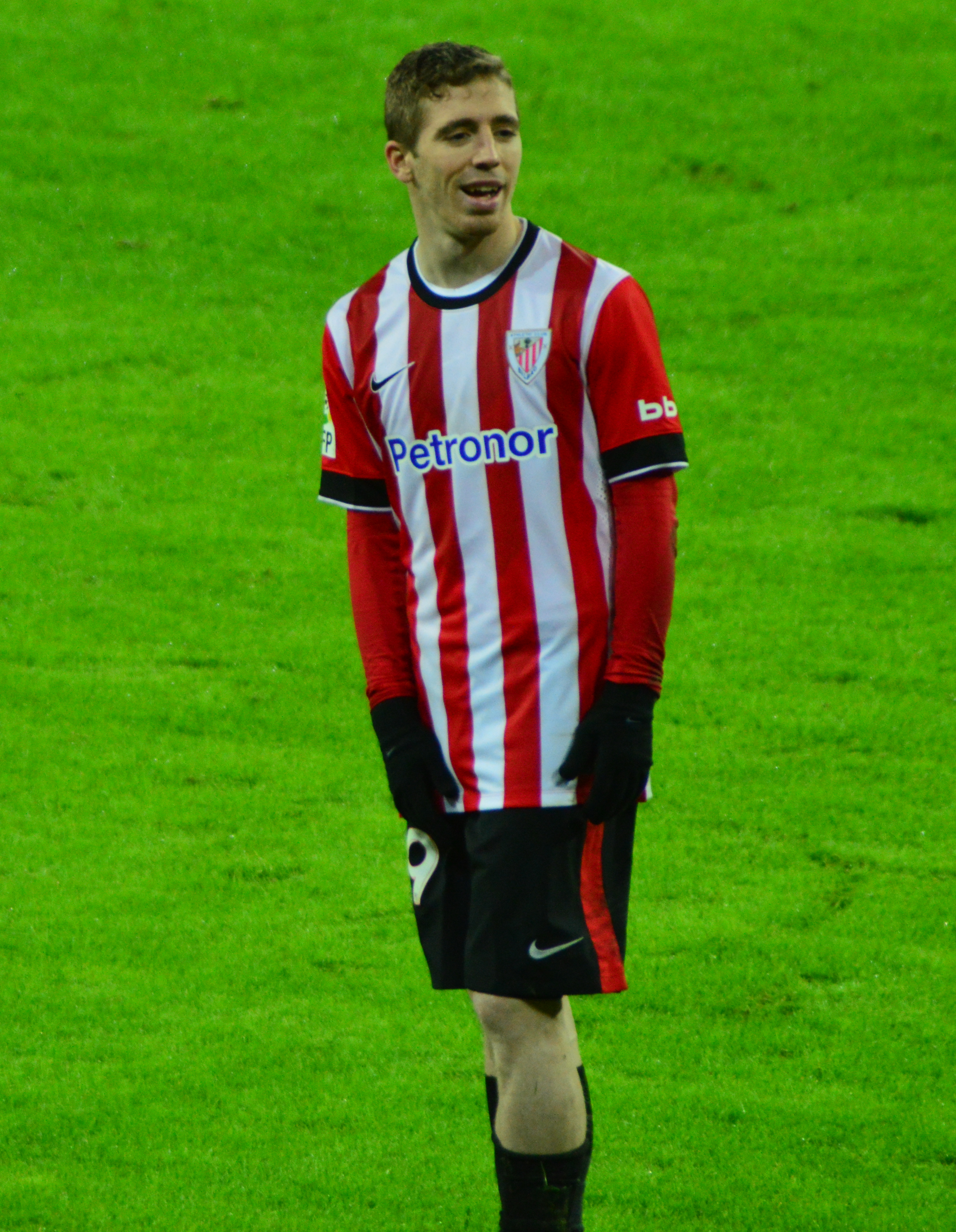
Iker Muniain is among the top scorers as well as the youngest ever

== Player records ==
Athletic's selective signing policy, limiting themselves to players with a connection to the Basque region, has meant only three players who played international football for a country other than Spain have featured for the club in European ties: Fernando Amorebieta who represented Venezuela, Iñaki Williams who opted for Ghana after playing once for Spain, and Maroan Sannadi who was capped for Morocco. (Note: Bixente Lizarazu, Kenan Kodro and Cristian Ganea never played in a European game for Athletic, Álvaro Djaló made his international debut after playing for Athletic in Europe.)

The club record for European appearances is currently held by Óscar de Marcos with 77, having overtaken Markel Susaeta's total of 75 in 2025.

The highest goalscorer is Aritz Aduriz on 34, including 10 in the 2015–16 UEFA Europa League which won him the competition's golden boot award.

As of 28 January 2026 (Note: 'Years' refers to the period when the player was involved in European fixtures with Athletic Bilbao, rather than their entire career.) (Note: Players with no 'end date' in their active years are currently playing for the club and their total is dynamic i.e. likely to change.)

=== Most appearances ===
Rank	Player	Years	Apps.	Ref.
1	Óscar de Marcos	2009–2025	77	
2	Markel Susaeta	2009–2018	75	
3	Iker Muniain	2009–2018	61	
4	José Ángel Iribar	1964–1978	55 (Note: Includes 26 appearances in non-UEFA Fairs Cup.)	
5	Ander Iturraspe	2009–2018	54	
6	Mikel San José	2009–2018	53	
7	Aritz Aduriz	2012–2018	48	
8	Andoni Iraola	2004–2015	46	
9	Gorka Iraizoz	2009–2017	45	
9	Iñaki Williams	2015–	45	

=== Top goalscorers ===
Rank	Player	Years	Goals	Ref.
1	Aritz Aduriz	2012–2018	34	
2	Fernando Llorente	2004–2012	16	
3	Markel Susaeta	2009–2018	12	
3	Iñaki Williams	2015–	12	
5	Dani	1976–1985	11	
6	Iker Muniain	2009–2018	10	
7	Fidel Uriarte	1964–1971	9 (Note: Includes 8 goals in non-UEFA Fairs Cup.)	
8	Óscar de Marcos	2009–2025	8	
9	Raúl García	2015–2018	7	
10	Joseba Etxeberria	1997–2009	6	
10	Mikel San José	2009–2018	6	
10	José Luis Artetxe	1956–1964	6 (Note: Includes 1 goal in non-UEFA Latin Cup.)	
10	Gorka Guruzeta	2024–	6	

== Managerial statistics ==
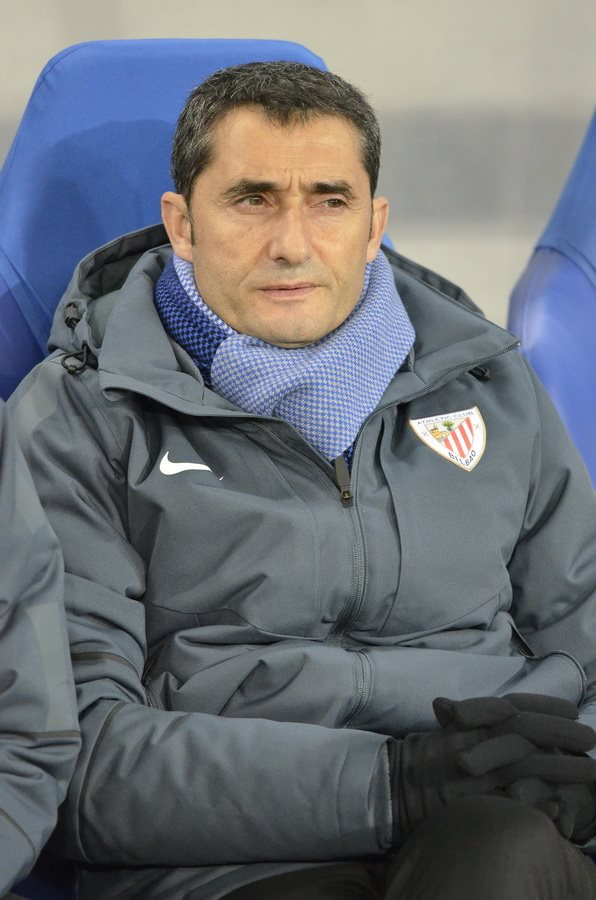
Ernesto Valverde has coached the team in 64 matches, winning 30

Ernesto Valverde holds the club record for most European games as manager with 64 over three spells, more than twice as many as any other. He also holds the records for most wins (30) and most defeats (22), and is the only man to take charge of the team in European matches in more than one managerial spell.

Koldo Aguirre (1977) and Marcelo Bielsa (2012) were the coaches who led Athletic to UEFA finals.

As of 28 January 2026

European record by manager and tenure
Manager	From	To	Record					Sources
Manager	From	To	Pld	W	D	L	Win %	Sources
Ferdinand Daučík	June 1956	February 1957	8	5	1	2	62.5	(Note: Includes 2 matches in non-UEFA Latin Cup which are shown as friendlies on the club's website.)
Antonio Barrios	September 1964	May 1965	10	6	1	3	60.0	(Note: All 10 matches in non-UEFA Fairs Cup.)
Agustín Gaínza	September 1966	October 1968	10	6	0	4	60.0	(Note: All 10 matches in non-UEFA Fairs Cup.)
Rafael Iriondo	November 1968	April 1969	6	3	2	1	50.0	(Note: All 6 matches in non-UEFA Fairs Cup.)
Ronnie Allen	September 1969	November 1971	8	1	3	4	12.5	(Note: Includes 2 matches in non-UEFA Fairs Cup.)
Milorad Pavić	September 1973	November 1973	4	2	1	1	50.0	
Koldo Aguirre	September 1976	September 1978	20	8	5	7	40.0	
Javier Clemente	September 1982	December 1985	14	6	3	5	42.9	
José Ángel Iribar	September 1986	November 1986	4	2	0	2	50.0	
Howard Kendall	September 1988	November 1988	4	2	0	2	50.0	
Javier Irureta	September 1994	December 1994	6	3	0	3	50.0	
Luis Fernández	September 1997	December 1998	12	4	4	4	33.3	
Ernesto Valverde	September 2004	February 2005	8	4	1	3	50.0	
José Luis Mendilibar	July 2005	July 2005	2	1	0	1	50.0	
Joaquín Caparrós	July 2009	February 2010	12	5	3	4	41.7	
Marcelo Bielsa	August 2011	December 2012	26	12	6	8	46.2	
Ernesto Valverde	August 2014	February 2017	34	16	7	11	47.1	
José Ángel Ziganda	July 2017	March 2018	14	7	3	4	50.0	
Ernesto Valverde	September 2024	Present	22	10	4	8	45.5	
Total			224	103	44	77	46.0	

== Overall statistics ==
As of 28 January 2026

Competition		Rounds (Note: Outcome of round or group, either progression or elimination)		Matches				Goals		
Name	Entries			Pld	W	D	L	GF	GA	GD
European Cup (1955–1992)	3	3	3	12	5	3	4	22	20	2
Champions League (1992–)	3	2	3	24	7	7	10	25	31	−6
UEFA Cup (1971–2009)	11	17	11	58	27	9	22	88	71	17
Europa League (2009–)	8	25	8	92	45	19	28	154	126	28
Fairs Cup (1958–1971) (Note: non-UEFA competition)	5	8	5	28	15	4	9	34	32	2
Cup Winners' Cup (1960–1999)	2	1	2	6	2	2	2	6	9	−3
Intertoto Cup (1995–2008)	1	0	1	2	1	0	1	1	1	0
Latin Cup (1948–1957) (Note: non-UEFA competition)	1	1	1	2	1	0	1	3	3	0
Total	34	57	34	214	103	44	77	333	293	40

== Statistics by opponent and country ==
As of 28 January 2026

Country	Club	Pld	W	D	L	GF	GA	GD
Austria	Austria Wien	4	2	1	1	6	2	4
Austria	Rapid Wien	2	1	1	0	2	1	1
Austria	Red Bull Salzburg	2	1	1	0	3	2	1
Subtotal		8	4	3	1	11	5	6
Azerbaijan	Inter Baku	2	1	1	0	2	0	2
Azerbaijan	Qarabağ	1	1	0	0	3	1	2
Subtotal		3	2	1	0	5	1	4
Belarus	BATE Borisov	2	1	0	1	3	2	1
Subtotal		2	1	0	1	3	2	1
Belgium	Anderlecht	2	0	1	1	1	5	−4
Belgium	Antwerp	2	2	0	0	3	0	3
Belgium	Beveren	2	1	0	1	3	4	−1
Belgium	Genk	2	1	0	1	5	5	0
Belgium	RFC Liégeois	2	2	0	0	4	1	3
Belgium	RWD Molenbeek	2	0	2	0	1	1	0
Belgium	Standard Liège	1	1	0	0	7	1	6
Subtotal		13	7	3	3	24	17	7
Bulgaria	Beroe	2	1	0	1	1	3	−2
Bulgaria	Ludogorets Razgrad	1	1	0	0	2	1	1
Subtotal		3	2	0	1	3	4	−1
Croatia	Slaven Koprivnica	2	1	0	1	4	3	1
Subtotal		2	1	0	1	4	3	1
Cyprus	Anorthosis Famagusta	2	1	0	1	3	2	1
Cyprus	APOEL	2	1	0	1	3	4	−1
Subtotal		4	2	0	2	6	6	0
Czech Republic (Note: Including matches against teams competing for Czechoslovakia (only 1 tie, Czech-based team))	Slavia Prague	2	1	1	0	1	0	1
Czech Republic	Sparta Prague	4	0	2	2	2	6	−4
Czech Republic	Viktoria Plzeň	1	1	0	0	3	1	2
Subtotal		7	2	3	2	6	7	−1
Denmark	Frem	2	2	0	0	4	2	2
Subtotal		2	2	0	0	4	2	2
England	Arsenal	1	0	0	1	0	2	−3
England	Aston Villa	4	0	2	2	2	5	−3
England	Liverpool	4	1	1	2	3	4	−1
England	Newcastle United	3	1	0	2	3	5	−2
England	Manchester City	2	0	1	1	3	6	−3
England	Manchester United	6	3	0	3	11	16	−5
England	Southampton	2	1	0	1	3	2	1
Subtotal		22	6	4	12	25	40	−17
Finland	HJK	2	1	1	0	9	3	6
Subtotal		2	1	1	0	9	3	6
France	Bordeaux	4	2	1	1	6	4	2
France	Lyon	2	0	0	2	3	5	−2
France	Marseille	4	1	1	2	4	6	−2
France	Nice	1	1	0	0	2	0	2
France	Paris Saint-Germain	3	1	1	1	4	4	0
Subtotal		14	5	3	6	19	19	0
(Georgia (country)) Georgia	Dinamo Tbilisi	2	1	0	1	2	2	0
Subtotal		2	1	0	1	2	2	0
Germany (Note: Including matches against teams competing for West Germany and East Germany)	FC Augsburg	2	2	0	0	6	3	3
Germany	Borussia Dortmund	1	0	0	1	1	4	−3
Germany	Eintracht Braunschweig	2	0	1	1	3	4	−1
Germany	Eintracht Frankfurt	2	1	1	0	2	1	1
Germany	Hertha BSC	2	1	1	0	3	2	1
Germany	1. FC Magdeburg	2	1	0	1	2	1	1
Germany	Schalke 04	2	1	1	0	6	4	2
Germany	Werder Bremen	2	0	0	2	1	6	−5
Subtotal		15	6	4	5	24	25	−1
Greece	AEK Athens	2	1	0	1	2	1	1
Greece	Panathinaikos	4	3	1	0	5	2	3
Subtotal		6	4	1	1	7	3	4
Hungary	Budapest Honvéd	2	1	1	0	6	5	1
Hungary	Ferencváros	7	1	1	5	6	12	−6
Hungary	Újpest	4	2	0	2	8	3	5
Subtotal		13	4	2	7	20	20	0
Israel	Ironi Kiryat Shmona	2	1	1	0	3	1	2
Subtotal		2	1	1	0	3	1	2
Italy	Atalanta	1	1	0	0	3	2	1
Italy	Juventus	6	2	2	2	7	10	−3
Italy	Milan	3	1	0	2	6	7	−1
Italy	Napoli	2	1	1	0	4	2	2
Italy	Parma	3	2	0	1	5	4	1
Italy	Roma	3	1	1	1	5	4	1
Italy	Sampdoria	2	2	0	0	4	1	3
Italy	Sassuolo	2	1	0	1	3	5	−2
Italy	Torino	2	0	1	1	4	5	−1
Subtotal		24	11	5	8	41	40	1
Netherlands	Ajax	2	1	0	1	2	3	−1
Netherlands	AZ	3	1	1	1	5	4	+1
Subtotal		5	2	1	2	7	7	0
Norway	Rosenborg	2	0	1	1	2	3	−1
Norway	Tromsø	2	1	1	0	4	3	1
Subtotal		4	1	2	1	6	6	0
Poland	Lech Poznań	2	1	0	1	4	2	2
Subtotal		2	1	0	1	4	2	2
Portugal	Nacional	2	1	1	0	3	2	1
Portugal	Porto	4	2	0	2	6	7	−1
Portugal	Sporting CP	5	2	0	3	8	10	−2
Subtotal		11	5	1	5	17	19	−2
Romania	CFR Cluj	2	1	0	1	1	1	0
Romania	Dinamo București	2	1	1	0	4	1	3
Romania	Steaua București	1	1	0	0	1	0	1
Subtotal		5	3	1	1	6	2	4
Russia (Note: Including matches against teams competing for the Soviet Union (only 1 tie, Russian-based team))	Lokomotiv Moscow	2	1	0	1	2	2	0
Russia	Spartak Moscow	2	1	0	1	4	3	1
Russia	Torpedo Moscow	2	1	1	0	2	0	2
Subtotal		6	3	1	2	8	5	3
Scotland	Dunfermline Athletic	3	2	0	1	3	2	1
Scotland	Rangers	4	2	1	1	5	4	1
Subtotal		7	4	1	2	8	6	2
Serbia (Note: Including matches against teams competing for Yugoslavia (all were based in Serbia))	OFK Beograd	2	1	1	0	4	2	2
Serbia	Partizan	2	2	0	0	7	1	6
Serbia	Red Star Belgrade	2	1	0	1	2	5	−3
Subtotal		6	4	1	1	13	8	5
Slovakia	Slovan Bratislava	2	2	0	0	4	2	2
Slovakia	Žilina	2	1	0	1	3	3	0
Subtotal		4	3	0	1	7	5	2
Spain	Atlético Madrid	1	0	0	1	0	3	−3
Spain	Barcelona	2	1	1	0	4	3	1
Spain	Sevilla	2	1	0	1	3	3	0
Spain	Valencia	2	1	0	1	2	2	0
Subtotal		7	3	1	3	9	11	−2
Sweden	IF Elfsborg	1	1	0	0	3	0	3
Sweden	Östersund	2	1	1	0	3	2	1
Subtotal		3	2	1	0	6	2	4
Switzerland	Basel	2	1	1	0	4	2	2
Switzerland	Servette	2	1	0	1	2	1	1
Switzerland	Young Boys	2	1	0	1	2	2	0
Subtotal		6	3	1	2	8	5	3
Turkey	Beşiktaş	4	2	0	2	7	8	−1
Turkey	Fenerbahçe	1	1	0	0	2	0	2
Turkey	Galatasaray	2	1	0	1	2	2	0
Turkey	Trabzonspor	3	1	1	1	4	3	1
Subtotal		10	5	1	4	15	13	2
Ukraine	Shakhtar Donetsk	2	1	1	0	1	0	1
Ukraine	Zorya Luhansk	2	1	0	1	2	1	1
Subtotal		4	2	1	1	3	1	2
Total		224	103	44	77	333	292	41

== Results by season ==
=== Key ===
- S = Seasons
- Pld = Matches played
- W = Matches won
- D = Matches drawn
- L = Matches lost
- GF = Goals for
- GA = Goals against
- a.e.t. = Match determined after extra time
- a = Match determined by away goals rule
- p = Match determined by penalty shoot-out
- CT = Match determined by coin toss
- w/o = Walkover
- LATIN = Latin Cup
- ECC = European Champions Cup
- ICFC = Inter-Cities Fairs Cup
- CWC = European Cup Winners' Cup
- UIT = UEFA Intertoto Cup
- UEL = UEFA Europa League
- UCL = UEFA Champions League
- SF = Semi-finals
- QF = Quarter-finals
- R16 = Round of last 16
- R32 = Round of last 32
- Group = Group stage
- PO = Play-off round
- 3R = Round 3
- 2R = Round 2
- 1R = Round 1
- Q3 = Third qualification round
- Q2 = Second qualification round
- Q1 = First qualification round
- = Progression to next round
- = Elimination from tournament

=== List of matches ===
Athletic Bilbao score displayed first in all results;

As of 28 January 2026

Season	Comp.	Round	Opponent	Home	Away	Other	Agg.	(Note: Round or group progressed or eliminated)	Sources
1956	LATIN	SF	(France) Nice	—N/a	—N/a	2–0 (Note: Played at Arena Civica, Milan, Italy)			
1956	LATIN	Final	(Italy) Milan	—N/a	—N/a	1–3			
1956–57	ECC	1R	(Portugal) Porto	3–2 (Note: First European match at San Mamés Stadium (1913))	2–1		5–3		
1956–57	ECC	2R	(Hungary) Honvéd	3–2	3–3 (Note: Played at Stade du Heysel, Brussels due to political unrest in Hungary)		6–5		
1956–57	ECC	QF	(England) Manchester United	5–3	0–3 (Note: Match played at Maine Road)		5–6		
1964–65	ICFC	1R	(Socialist Federal Republic of Yugoslavia) OFK Beograd	2–2	2–0		4–2		
1964–65	ICFC	2R	(Belgium) Antwerp	2–0	1–0		3–0		
1964–65	ICFC	3R	(Scotland) Dunfermline Athletic	1–0	0–1	2–1 (Note: Playoff played at San Mamés, Bilbao)	3–2		
1964–65	ICFC	QF	(Hungary) Ferencváros (Note: Ferencváros were the eventual winners)	2–1	0–1	0–3 (Note: Playoff played at Nepstadion, Budapest)	2–5		
1966–67	ICFC	1R	(Socialist Federal Republic of Yugoslavia) Red Star Belgrade	2–0	0–5 (Note: The club's worst European result)		2–5		
1967–68	ICFC	1R	(Denmark) Frem	3–2	1–0		4–2		
1967–68	ICFC	2R	(France) Bordeaux	1–0	3–1		4–1		
1967–68	ICFC	QF	(Hungary) Ferencváros	1–2	1–2		2–4		
1968–69	ICFC	1R	(England) Liverpool	2–1	1–2 (a.e.t.)		3–3 (CT) (Note: Athletic won on the toss of a coin)		
1968–69	ICFC	2R	(Greece) Panathinaikos	1–0	0–0		1–0		
1968–69	ICFC	3R	(West Germany) Eintracht Frankfurt	1–0	1–1		2–1		
1968–69	ICFC	QF	(Scotland) Rangers	2–0	1–4		3–4		
1969–70	CWC	1R	(England) Manchester City (Note: Manchester City were the eventual winners)	3–3	0–3		3–6		
1970–71	ICFC	1R	(Czechoslovakia) Sparta Prague	1–1	0–2		1–3		
1971–72	UEFA	1R	(England) Southampton	2–0	1–2		3–2		
1971–72	UEFA	2R	(West Germany) Eintracht Braunschweig	2–2	1–2		2–3		
1973–74	CWC	1R	(Soviet Union) Torpedo Moscow	2–0	0–0		2–0		
1973–74	CWC	2R	(Bulgaria) Beroe	1–0	0–3		1–3		
1976–77	UEFA	1R	(Hungary) Újpest	5–0	0–1		5–1		
1976–77	UEFA	2R	(Switzerland) Basel	3–1	1–1		4–2		
1976–77	UEFA	3R	(Italy) Milan	4–1	1–3		5–4		
1976–77	UEFA	QF	(Spain) Barcelona	2–1	2–2		4–3		
1976–77	UEFA	SF	(Belgium) RWD Molenbeek	0–0	1–1		1–1 (a)		
1976–77	UEFA	Final	(Italy) Juventus	2–1	0–1		2–2 (a)		
1977–78	UEFA	1R	(Switzerland) Servette	2–0	0–1		2–1		
1977–78	UEFA	2R	(Hungary) Újpest	3–0 (a.e.t.)	0–2		3–2		
1977–78	UEFA	3R	(England) Aston Villa	1–1	0–2		1–3		
1978–79	UEFA	1R	(Netherlands) Ajax	2–0	0–3		2–3		
1982–83	UEFA	1R	(Hungary) Ferencváros	1–1	1–2		2–3		
1983–84	ECC	1R	(Poland) Lech Poznań	4–0	0–2		4–2		
1983–84	ECC	2R	(England) Liverpool (Note: Liverpool were the eventual winners)	0–1	0–0		0–1		
1984–85	ECC	1R	(France) Bordeaux	0–0	2–3		2–3		
1985–86	UEFA	1R	(Turkey) Beşiktaş	4–1	1–0		5–1		
1985–86	UEFA	2R	(Belgium) RFC Liégeois	3–1	1–0		4–1		
1985–86	UEFA	3R	(Portugal) Sporting CP	2–1	0–3		2–4		
1986–87	UEFA	1R	(East Germany) 1. FC Magdeburg	2–0	0–1		2–1		
1986–87	UEFA	2R	(Belgium) Beveren	2–1	1–3		3–4		
1988–89	UEFA	1R	(Greece) AEK Athens	2–0	0–1		2–1		
1988–89	UEFA	2R	(Italy) Juventus	3–2	1–5		4–7		
1994–95	UEFA	1R	(Cyprus) Anorthosis Famagusta	3–0	0–2		3–2		
1994–95	UEFA	2R	(England) Newcastle United	1–0	2–3		3–3 (a)		
1994–95	UEFA	3R	(Italy) Parma (Note: Parma were the eventual winners)	1–0	2–4		3–4		
1997–98	UEFA	1R	(Italy) Sampdoria	2–0	2–1		4–1		
1997–98	UEFA	2R	(England) Aston Villa	0–0	1–2		1–2		
1998–99	UCL	Q2	(Georgia (country)) Dinamo Tbilisi	1–0	1–2		2–2 (a)		
1998–99	UCL	Group stage	(Norway) Rosenborg	1–1	1–2		4th place		
1998–99	UCL	Group stage	(Italy) Juventus	0–0	1–1		4th place		
1998–99	UCL	Group stage	(Turkey) Galatasaray	1–0	1–2		4th place		
2004–05	UEFA	1R	(Turkey) Trabzonspor	2–0	2–3		4–3		
2004–05	UEFA	Group stage	(Italy) Parma	2–0	—N/a		1st place		
2004–05	UEFA	Group stage	(Turkey) Beşiktaş	—N/a	1–3		1st place		
2004–05	UEFA	Group stage	(Romania) Steaua București	1–0	—N/a		1st place		
2004–05	UEFA	Group stage	(Belgium) Standard Liège	—N/a	7–1 (Note: The club's best European result)		1st place		
2004–05	UEFA	R32	Austria Wien	1–2	0–0		1–2		
2005–06	UIT	2R	(Romania) CFR Cluj	1–0 (a.e.t.)	0–1		1–1 (3–5 p)		
2009–10	UEL	Q3	(Switzerland) Young Boys	0–1	2–1		2–2 (a)		
2009–10	UEL	PO	(Norway) Tromsø	1–1	3–2		4–3		
2009–10	UEL	Group stage	Austria Wien	3–0	3–0		2nd place		
2009–10	UEL	Group stage	(Germany) Werder Bremen	0–3	1–3		2nd place		
2009–10	UEL	Group stage	(Portugal) Nacional	2–1	1–1		2nd place		
2009–10	UEL	R32	(Belgium) Anderlecht	1–1	0–4		1–5 (Note: The club's worst aggregate loss)		
2011–12	UEL	PO	(Turkey) Trabzonspor	0–0	N/A (Note: Match not played due to Trabzonspor taking Fenerbahçe's Champions League place)		0–0 w/o		
2011–12	UEL	Group stage	(Slovakia) Slovan Bratislava	2–1	2–1		1st place		
2011–12	UEL	Group stage	(France) Paris Saint-Germain	2–0	2–4		1st place		
2011–12	UEL	Group stage	(Austria) Red Bull Salzburg	2–2	1–0		1st place		
2011–12	UEL	R32	(Russia) Lokomotiv Moscow	1–0	1–2		2–2 (a)		
2011–12	UEL	R16	(England) Manchester United	2–1	3–2		5–3		
2011–12	UEL	QF	(Germany) Schalke 04	2–2	4–2		6–4		
2011–12	UEL	SF	(Portugal) Sporting CP	3–1	1–2		4–3		
2011–12	UEL	Final	(Spain) Atlético Madrid	—N/a	—N/a	0–3 (Note: Played at Arena Națională, Romania)			
2012–13	UEL	Q3	(Croatia) Slaven Koprivnica	3–1	1–2		4–3		
2012–13	UEL	PO	(Finland) HJK	6–0	3–3		9–3 (Note: The club's highest aggregate win)		
2012–13	UEL	Group stage	(Israel) Ironi Kiryat Shmona	1–1	2–0 (Note: Played at Kiryat Eliezer Stadium, Haifa due to political unrest in northern Israel)		3rd place		
2012–13	UEL	Group stage	(Czech Republic) Sparta Prague	0–0 (Note: Last European match at San Mamés Stadium (1913))	1–3		3rd place		
2012–13	UEL	Group stage	(France) Lyon	2–3	1–2		3rd place		
2014–15	UCL	PO	(Italy) Napoli	3–1 (Note: First European match at San Mamés Stadium (2013))	1–1		4–2		
2014–15	UCL	Group stage	(Ukraine) Shakhtar Donetsk	0–0	1–0 (Note: Played at Arena Lviv, Lviv, due to war conditions in Eastern Ukraine)		3rd place		
2014–15	UCL	Group stage	(Portugal) Porto	0–2	1–2		3rd place		
2014–15	UCL	Group stage	(Belarus) BATE Borisov	2–0	1–2		3rd place		
2014–15	UEL (Note: Moved to Europa League after finishing 3rd in Champions League group)	R32	(Italy) Torino	2–3	2–2		4–5		
2015–16	UEL	Q3	(Azerbaijan) Inter Baku	2–0	0–0		2–0		
2015–16	UEL	PO	(Slovakia) Žilina	1–0	2–3		3–3 (a)		
2015–16	UEL	Group stage	(Germany) FC Augsburg	3–1	3–2		1st place		
2015–16	UEL	Group stage	(Netherlands) AZ	2–2	1–2		1st place		
2015–16	UEL	Group stage	(Serbia) Partizan	5–1	2–0		1st place		
2015–16	UEL	R32	(France) Marseille	1–1	1–0		2–1		
2015–16	UEL	R16	(Spain) Valencia	1–0	1–2		2–2 (a)		
2015–16	UEL	QF	(Spain) Sevilla (Note: Sevilla were the eventual winners)	1–2	2–1 (a.e.t.)		3–3 (4–5 p)		
2016–17	UEL	Group stage	(Italy) Sassuolo	3–2	0–3		2nd place		
2016–17	UEL	Group stage	(Austria) Rapid Wien	1–0	1–1		2nd place		
2016–17	UEL	Group stage	(Belgium) Genk	5–3	0–2		2nd place		
2016–17	UEL	R32	(Cyprus) APOEL	3–2	0–2		3–4		
2017–18	UEL	Q3	(Romania) Dinamo București	3–0	1–1		4–1		
2017–18	UEL	PO	(Greece) Panathinaikos	1–0	3–2		4–2		
2017–18	UEL	Group stage	(Sweden) Östersund	1–0	2–2		1st place		
2017–18	UEL	Group stage	(Ukraine) Zorya Luhansk	0–1	2–0		1st place		
2017–18	UEL	Group stage	(Germany) Hertha BSC	3–2	0–0		1st place		
2017–18	UEL	R32	(Russia) Spartak Moscow	1–2	3–1		4–3		
2017–18	UEL	R16	(France) Marseille	1–2	1–3		2–5		
2024–25	UEL	League phase	(Italy) Roma	—N/a	1–1		2nd place		
2024–25	UEL	League phase	(Netherlands) AZ	2–0	—N/a		2nd place		
2024–25	UEL	League phase	(Czech Republic) Slavia Prague	1–0	—N/a		2nd place		
2024–25	UEL	League phase	(Bulgaria) Ludogorets Razgrad	—N/a	2–1		2nd place		
2024–25	UEL	League phase	(Sweden) IF Elfsborg	3–0	—N/a		2nd place		
2024–25	UEL	League phase	(Turkey) Fenerbahçe	—N/a	2–0		2nd place		
2024–25	UEL	League phase	(Turkey) Beşiktaş	—N/a	1–4		2nd place		
2024–25	UEL	League phase	(Czech Republic) Viktoria Plzeň	3–1	—N/a		2nd place		
2024–25	UEL	R16	(Italy) Roma	3–1	1–2		4–3		
2024–25	UEL	QF	(Scotland) Rangers	2–0	0–0		2–0		
2024–25	UEL	SF	(England) Manchester United	0–3	1–4		1–7		
2025–26	UCL	League phase	(England) Arsenal	0–2	—N/a		29th place		
2025–26	UCL	League phase	(Germany) Borussia Dortmund	—N/a	1–4		29th place		
2025–26	UCL	League phase	(Azerbaijan) Qarabağ	3–1	—N/a		29th place		
2025–26	UCL	League phase	(England) Newcastle United	—N/a	0–2		29th place		
2025–26	UCL	League phase	(Czech Republic) Slavia Prague	—N/a	0–0		29th place		
2025–26	UCL	League phase	(France) Paris Saint-Germain	0–0	—N/a		29th place		
2025–26	UCL	League phase	(Italy) Atalanta	—N/a	3–2		29th place		
2025–26	UCL	League phase	(Portugal) Sporting CP	2–3	—N/a		29th place		
Win / Draw / Loss totals (as of 28 January 2026)				73	28	2 (Note: This includes one playoff match played at San Mamés, therefore one more match played at home although not technically a home leg.)	Wins =		103
Win / Draw / Loss totals (as of 28 January 2026)				22	22	0	Draws =		44
Win / Draw / Loss totals (as of 28 January 2026)				15	59	3	Losses =		77
Win / Draw / Loss totals (as of 28 January 2026)				Home = 110	Away = 109	Other = 5	Total =		224
