= 1977 UEFA Cup final =

- Event: 1976–77 UEFA Cup
Juventus	Athletic Bilbao
(Italy)	(Spain)
2	2
- on aggregate Juventus won on away goals

First leg
Juventus	Athletic Bilbao
1	0
- Date: 4 May 1977
- Venue: Stadio Comunale Vittorio Pozzo, Turin
- Referee: Charles Corver (Netherlands)
- Attendance: 54,800

Second leg
Athletic Bilbao	Juventus
2	1
- Date: 18 May 1977
- Venue: San Mamés, Bilbao
- Referee: Erich Linemayr (Austria)
- Attendance: 39,700

The 1977 UEFA Cup Final was played on 4 May 1977 and 18 May 1977 between Italian side Juventus and Spanish side Athletic Bilbao. Juventus won 2–2 on away goals.

This is the only triumph for an Italian side in an official European tournament without foreign players in its first team squad. It also marked Juventus' first title in European football, as well as the first time the UEFA Cup was won by a Southern European club.

== Route to the final ==
Juventus				Round	Athletic Bilbao			
Opponent	Agg.	1st leg	2nd leg		Opponent	Agg.	1st leg	2nd leg
(England) Manchester City	2–1	0–1 (A)	2–0 (H)	First round	(Hungary) Újpesti Dózsa	5–1	0–1 (A)	5–0 (H)
(England) Manchester United	3–1	0–1 (A)	3–0 (H)	Second round	(Switzerland) Basel	4–2	1–1 (A)	3–1 (H)
(Soviet Union) Shakhtar Donetsk	3–1	3–0 (H)	0–1 (A)	Third round	(Italy) A.C. Milan	5–4	4–1 (H)	1–3 (A)
(East Germany) Magdeburg	4–1	3–1 (A)	1–0 (H)	Quarter-finals	(Spain) Barcelona	4–3	2–1 (H)	2–2 (A)
(Greece) AEK Athens	5–1	4–1 (H)	1–0 (A)	Semi-finals	(Belgium) Molenbeek	1–1 (a)	1–1 (A)	0–0 (H)

== Match details ==
=== First leg ===
4 May 1977

Juventus (Italy)	1–0	(Spain) Athletic Bilbao
Tardelli 15'	Report Overview (archive) Overview

Stadio Comunale, Turin
Attendance: 54,800
Referee: Charles Corver (Netherlands)

Juventus	Athletic Bilbao

GK	1	(Italy) Dino Zoff
RB	2	(Italy) Antonello Cuccureddu
CB	5	(Italy) Francesco Morini
SW	6	(Italy) Gaetano Scirea
LB	3	(Italy) Claudio Gentile
CM	4	(Italy) Giuseppe Furino (c)
AM	10	(Italy) Romeo Benetti
CM	8	(Italy) Marco Tardelli
RW	7	(Italy) Franco Causio
CF	9	(Italy) Roberto Boninsegna	(substituted off) 40'
SS	11	(Italy) Roberto Bettega
Substitutes:
FW	12	(Italy) Sergio Gori	(substituted on) 40'
Manager:
(Italy) Giovanni Trapattoni

GK	1	(Spain) José Ángel Iribar (c)
RB	2	(Spain) José Ignacio Oñaederra
CB	5	(Spain) Agustín Guisasola
CB	6	(Spain) Andoni Goikoetxea	(yellow card) 50'
LB	3	(Spain) Javier Escalza
CM	8	(Spain) Javier Irureta
CM	4	(Spain) Ángel María Villar
CM	11	(Spain) Txetxu Rojo
CF	7	(Spain) Dani
CF	9	(Spain) José Ignacio Churruca
CF	10	(Spain) José Ángel Rojo
Manager:
(Spain) Koldo Aguirre

=== Second leg ===
18 May 1977

Athletic Bilbao (Spain)	2–1	(Italy) Juventus
Irureta 11'; Ruiz 78'	Report Overview (archive) Overview	Bettega 7'

San Mamés Stadium, Bilbao
Attendance: 39,700
Referee: Erich Linemayr (Austria)

Athletic Bilbao	Juventus

GK	1	(Spain) José Ángel Iribar (c)
RB	2	(Spain) José Lasa	(substituted off) 64'
CB	5	(Spain) Agustín Guisasola
CB	6	(Spain) José Ramón Alexanko
LB	3	(Spain) Javier Escalza
CM	4	(Spain) Ángel María Villar
CM	8	(Spain) Javier Irureta
CM	11	(Spain) Txetxu Rojo
FW	7	(Spain) Dani
FW	10	(Spain) José Ignacio Churruca
FW	9	(Spain) José María Amorrortu
Substitutes:
FW	12	(Spain) Carlos	(substituted on) 64'
Manager:
(Spain) Koldo Aguirre

GK	1	(Italy) Dino Zoff
RB	2	(Italy) Antonello Cuccureddu
CB	5	(Italy) Francesco Morini
SW	6	(Italy) Gaetano Scirea
LB	3	(Italy) Claudio Gentile	(yellow card) 87'
RW	7	(Italy) Franco Causio
CM	8	(Italy) Marco Tardelli	(yellow card) 70'
CM	4	(Italy) Giuseppe Furino (c)
AM	10	(Italy) Romeo Benetti	(yellow card) 63'
CF	9	(Italy) Roberto Boninsegna		(substituted off) 60'
SS	11	(Italy) Roberto Bettega
Substitutes:
DF	13	(Italy) Luciano Spinosi		(substituted on) 60'
Manager:
(Italy) Giovanni Trapattoni

== See also ==
- 1977 European Cup final
- 1977 European Cup Winners' Cup final
- Blocco-Juve
- Athletic Bilbao in European football
- Juventus FC in international football
- 1976–77 Juventus FC season
