= José Lasa =

Spanish footballer

José María Lasa
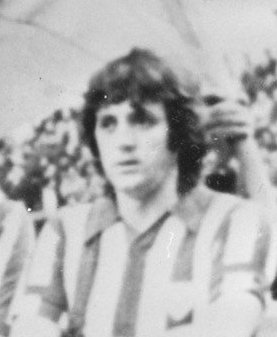
- Lasa in 1977

Personal information
- Full name: José María Lasa Ibarguren
- Date of birth: 3 March 1948 (age 78)
- Place of birth: Andoain, Spain
- Height: 1.71 m (5 ft 7 in)
- Positions: Right-back; winger

Senior career*
Years	Team	Apps	(Gls)
1966–1967	Euskalduna		
1967–1968	Logroñés		
1968–1970	Valladolid	57	(14)
1970–1972	Granada	58	(14)
1972–1978	Athletic Bilbao	177	(19)
1978–1980	Zaragoza	52	(5)
1981–1983	Durango		
1983–1984	Abadiño		
Total		344	(52)

International career
1971	Spain U23	4	(0)
1979	Basque Country	1	(0)
- * Club domestic league appearances and goals

José María Lasa Ibarguren (born 3 March 1948) is a Spanish former footballer who played mainly as a right-back.

He amassed La Liga totals of 287 games and 38 goals, representing in the competition Granada, Athletic Bilbao and Zaragoza.

== Club career ==
Born in Andoain, Gipuzkoa, Lasa reached the professional level at the age of 21 when he signed for Real Valladolid from CD Logroñés in 1968. He spent two seasons in the Segunda División with the former club, being relegated in the second; he started playing as a winger.

Lasa made his debut in La Liga with Granada CF, in a 1–1 away draw against Elche CF on 13 September 1970. He scored his first goal thirteen days later, in the 3–2 loss at Real Madrid. He finished the campaign with a further seven in 30 games, helping to a final tenth position.

Lasa joined fellow top-flight side Athletic Bilbao in the summer of 1972. He netted seven times from 32 appearances in his first year, which ended in conquest of the Copa del Generalísimo after a 2–0 win over CD Castellón.

During his years at the San Mamés Stadium, Lasa was eventually reconverted into a right-back by manager Rafael Iriondo. He left in 1980, having appeared in 222 matches in all competitions and scored 23 goals; this included 16 games in the UEFA Cup, one of them being the second leg of the 1977 final, lost to Juventus FC on the away goals rule.

Lasa closed out his professional career at the end of 1979–80, after two seasons in the top tier with Real Zaragoza. He retired four years later, with amateurs Abadiño KE.

== International career ==
Lasa represented Spain at under-23 level.

== Honours ==
Athletic Bilbao

- Copa del Generalísimo: 1972–73
