= Carlos (footballer, born 1948) =

Spanish footballer

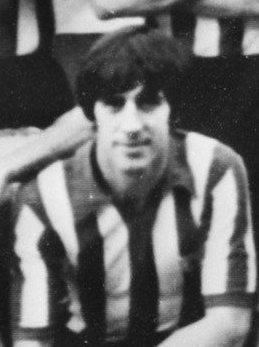
- Carlos in 1977

Personal information
- Full name: Carlos Ruiz Herrero
- Date of birth: 7 June 1948 (age 78)
- Place of birth: Bilbao, Spain
- Height: 1.83 m (6 ft 0 in)
- Position: Forward

Senior career*
Years	Team	Apps	(Gls)
1968–1969	Getxo		
1969–1970	Bilbao Athletic	25	(8)
1970–1981	Athletic Bilbao	213	(81)
1981–1982	Español	21	(2)
Total		259	(91)

International career
1977	Spain U21	1	(0)
- * Club domestic league appearances and goals

Carlos Ruiz Herrero (born 7 June 1948), known simply as Carlos, is a Spanish former professional footballer who played as a forward.

He spent 11 seasons in La Liga with Athletic Bilbao, appearing in 275 competitive games and scoring 115 goals.

== Club career ==
Born in Bilbao, Biscay, the third of ten sons in a large family, Carlos played 11 seasons with Athletic Bilbao plus one with the reserves, having been signed in 1969 from Basque neighbours CD Getxo. On 12 September 1970 he made his debut for the first team, playing the dying minutes of the 1–1 home draw against FC Barcelona.

Carlos continued to be used regularly by the club in the following years, but he also had to deal with several injuries. He helped the Lions to the final of the Copa del Rey in 1973 and 1977; in the former edition, he came on as a late substitute for Antón Arieta in the 2–0 win over CD Castellón. He scored ten times during the latter, including once in the penalty shootout loss to Real Betis in the decisive match (2–2 after 120 minutes) in Madrid.

In the 1974–75 season, Carlos scored a career-best 19 goals in 32 games for a tenth place in La Liga, winning the Pichichi Trophy in the process. On 18 May 1977, he put his side 2–1 up at home against Juventus FC in the final of the UEFA Cup – his last of five during their continental run – but the Italians won the trophy on the away goals rule.

Carlos still enjoyed two seasons in double digits until he left Athletic, including 1977–78 with 16 goals. He retired from the game in summer 1982 at the age of 34 after a spell with RCD Español, amassing top-flight totals of 234 appearances and 83 goals.

== International career ==
Carlos was never capped by Spain at senior level, but did play for the under-21 side once, in a match against Yugoslavia at Elche's Estadio Martínez Valero.

== Later life ==
Having studied medicine at the University of Bilbao at Leioa (later part of the University of the Basque Country) during his playing career, Ruiz subsequently went into practice as a doctor specialising in the treatment of athletes. He performed roles assisting various sports teams, including basketball club CB Cajabilbao and the Spanish national squads in handball and women's football.

In 2011, Ruiz was part of the team behind the unsuccessful campaign of Fernando García Macua to be re-elected as president of Athletic Bilbao.

== Honours ==
Athletic Bilbao

- Copa del Rey: 1972–73; runner-up: 1976–77
- UEFA Cup runner-up: 1976–77

Individual

- Pichichi Trophy: 1974–75
