= 1974–75 La Liga =

44th season of La Liga

Primera División
- Season: 1974–75
- Champions: Real Madrid (16th title)
- Relegated: Málaga; Celta Vigo; Murcia
- European Cup: Real Madrid
- UEFA Cup Winners' Cup: Atlético Madrid
- UEFA Cup: Zaragoza; Barcelona; Real Sociedad
- Matches: 306
- Goals: 745 (2.43 per match)
- Top goalscorer: Carlos (19 goals)

The 1974–75 La Liga was the 44th season since its establishment. The season began on 7 September 1974, and concluded on 25 May 1975.

== Team locations ==
Location of teams in La Liga 1974–75
Canary Islands

Team	Home city	Stadium
Athletic Bilbao	Bilbao	San Mamés
Atlético Madrid	Madrid	Vicente Calderón
Barcelona	Barcelona	Nou Camp
Celta Vigo	Vigo	Balaídos
Elche	Elche	Altabix
Español	Barcelona	Sarriá
Granada	Granada	Los Cármenes
Hércules	Alicante	José Rico Pérez
Las Palmas	Las Palmas	Insular
Málaga	Málaga	La Rosaleda
Murcia	Murcia	La Condomina
Real Betis	Seville	Benito Villamarín
Real Madrid	Madrid	Santiago Bernabéu
Real Sociedad	San Sebastián	Atocha
Salamanca	Villares de la Reina	Helmántico
Sporting Gijón	Gijón	El Molinón
Valencia	Valencia	Luis Casanova
Zaragoza	Zaragoza	La Romareda

== League table ==
Pos	Team	Pld	W	D	L	GF	GA	GD	Pts	Qualification or relegation
1	Real Madrid (C)	34	20	10	4	66	34	+32	50	Qualification for the European Cup first round
2	Zaragoza	34	15	8	11	58	47	+11	38	Qualification for the UEFA Cup first round
3	Barcelona	34	15	7	12	57	36	+21	37	Qualification for the UEFA Cup first round
4	Real Sociedad	34	12	12	10	37	32	+5	36	Qualification for the UEFA Cup first round
5	Hércules	34	11	14	9	37	36	+1	36	
6	Atlético Madrid	34	11	13	10	46	34	+12	35	Qualification for the Cup Winners' Cup first round (Note: Since Real Madrid qualified to the European Cup, Atlético Madrid qualified to the Cup Winners' Cup as runners-up of the Copa del Generalísimo.)
7	Salamanca	34	10	15	9	33	29	+4	35	
8	Elche	34	13	8	13	35	44	−9	34	
9	Real Betis	34	14	6	14	35	41	−6	34	
10	Athletic Bilbao	34	13	7	14	40	42	−2	33	
11	Español	34	14	5	15	38	47	−9	33	
12	Valencia	34	12	8	14	53	48	+5	32	
13	Las Palmas	34	12	8	14	41	39	+2	32	
14	Sporting Gijón	34	11	10	13	40	40	0	32	
15	Granada	34	10	11	13	35	47	−12	31	
16	Málaga (R)	34	13	5	16	33	42	−9	31	Relegation to the Segunda División
17	Celta Vigo (R)	34	10	10	14	30	41	−11	30	Relegation to the Segunda División
18	Murcia (R)	34	7	9	18	31	66	−35	23	Relegation to the Segunda División

Source: BDFútbol
Rules for classification: 1) Points; 2) Head-to-head results; 3) Goal difference; 4) Number of goals scored
(C) Champions; (R) Relegated

== Results table ==
Home \ Away	ATB	ATM	BAR	CEL	ELC	ESP	GRA	HÉR	LPA	MLG	MUR	BET	RGI	RMA	RSO	SAL	VAL	ZAR
Athletic Bilbao		3–0	1–0	3–0	3–0	1–0	1–0	2–2	2–1	3–1	2–0	0–1	1–4	1–0	2–1	0–0	1–1	4–0
Atlético Madrid	2–0		3–3	0–0	3–0	2–0	0–0	2–0	4–0	2–1	1–0	4–1	2–2	1–1	1–0	0–0	5–2	4–0
Barcelona	4–0	1–0		4–0	0–0	4–1	2–1	0–0	3–2	5–0	3–1	3–0	1–1	0–0	2–0	3–1	5–2	2–2
Celta Vigo	1–0	0–0	1–0		1–2	2–0	3–0	0–1	1–0	2–0	1–1	1–1	2–0	3–3	1–0	2–0	1–1	2–0
Elche	1–0	1–0	1–0	2–0		2–4	2–1	0–1	1–1	2–1	3–0	2–0	1–0	1–0	3–0	0–1	2–1	1–1
Español	4–3	1–0	5–2	2–0	2–1		1–0	2–1	1–0	1–2	2–1	1–0	0–0	0–2	0–1	1–0	5–3	2–1
Granada	1–1	0–0	1–2	1–0	5–0	0–0		1–1	1–1	1–0	2–1	2–0	2–1	3–3	1–0	1–1	2–1	3–0
Hércules	0–0	3–2	0–0	0–0	1–0	2–1	0–1		3–1	1–1	2–2	2–3	2–0	1–1	1–1	2–1	2–1	0–1
Las Palmas	2–0	1–0	1–0	3–1	1–1	2–0	4–0	0–0		1–0	5–0	3–1	1–0	1–2	1–0	1–1	1–1	2–0
Málaga	2–0	0–0	3–2	3–0	1–0	2–0	1–1	0–1	1–0		3–1	1–0	3–1	1–3	2–0	1–1	1–0	1–0
Murcia	2–4	3–1	0–2	1–0	2–0	0–0	0–0	1–1	1–1	2–0		0–0	2–1	2–2	2–2	2–1	1–5	1–5
Real Betis	2–1	2–1	1–0	1–0	1–1	0–0	1–1	3–0	1–0	1–0	1–0		2–0	1–3	3–0	1–1	2–0	1–0
Real Gijón	1–1	2–2	0–1	1–1	3–1	2–1	5–1	2–1	0–0	1–1	1–0	2–0		2–0	0–2	2–1	2–1	2–0
Real Madrid	2–0	1–0	1–0	4–1	5–1	5–0	1–0	2–1	4–1	4–0	4–0	3–2	0–0		1–1	1–0	3–2	1–0
Real Sociedad	3–0	1–1	3–2	1–1	0–0	2–0	2–0	2–2	2–0	2–0	2–0	2–0	1–1	1–1		1–1	1–0	1–0
Salamanca	0–0	1–1	1–0	0–0	2–0	2–0	1–0	0–1	2–1	1–0	3–0	2–0	1–0	0–0	1–1		0–1	3–3
Valencia	3–0	1–1	1–0	2–0	0–0	1–1	7–1	1–0	2–1	2–0	1–2	3–1	2–0	1–2	1–0	2–2		0–0
Zaragoza	1–0	3–1	2–1	4–2	3–3	1–0	4–1	2–2	3–1	1–0	5–0	2–1	3–1	6–1	1–1	1–1	3–1	

Legend: Blue = home team win; Yellow = draw; Red = away team win.

== Pichichi Trophy ==
Rank	Player	Club	Goals
1	(Spain) Carlos	Athletic Bilbao	19
2	(Spain) José Eulogio Gárate	Atlético Madrid	17
2	(Spain) Santillana	Real Madrid	17
4	(Paraguay) Saturnino Arrúa	Zaragoza	16
4	(Argentina) Roberto Martínez	Real Madrid	16
6	(Argentina) Juan Voglino	Elche	14
7	(Spain) José Antonio Barrios	Hércules	13
