= José Ángel Rojo =

Spanish footballer

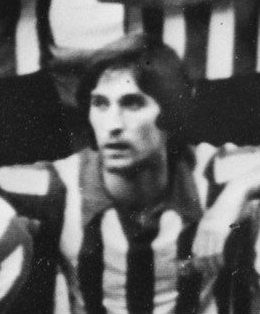
- Rojo in 1977

Personal information
- Full name: José Ángel Rojo Arroitia
- Date of birth: 19 March 1948 (age 78)
- Place of birth: Bilbao, Spain
- Height: 1.76 m (5 ft 9 in)
- Position: Midfielder

Youth career
- CD Firestone
- 1964–1966: Indautxu
- 1966–1968: Athletic Bilbao

Senior career*
Years	Team	Apps	(Gls)
1967–1970	Bilbao Athletic	31	(3)
1967	→ Indautxu (loan)	1	(0)
1968–1969	→ Indautxu (loan)	33	(5)
1970–1977	Athletic Bilbao	143	(8)
1977–1980	Racing Santander	70	(7)
Total		278	(23)

International career
1973	Spain	1	(0)
1971	Basque Country	1	(0)
- * Club domestic league appearances and goals

José Ángel Rojo Arroitia (born 19 March 1948) is a Spanish former professional footballer who played as a midfielder.

He played 192 La Liga matches over nine seasons, totalling 14 goals for Athletic Bilbao and Racing de Santander.

== Club career ==
=== Athletic Bilbao ===
Born in Bilbao, Biscay (Basque Country), Rojo joined the youth system of hometown club Athletic Bilbao in his last year as a junior. He made his senior debut with neighbouring SD Indautxu, being loaned twice to the Segunda División team and being relegated as many times; he also played in this competition with the former's reserves, again dropping down a level in the 1969–70 season after losing a play-off against Villarreal CF.

Rojo was definitely promoted to the first team aged 22, before the start of the following campaign. By that time, his elder brother José Francisco was already an established member of the line-up, and therefore the younger sibling was usually referred to administratively as Rojo II. José Ángel made his debut in La Liga on 24 January 1971 when he came on as a late substitute in a 2–1 away victory over Real Zaragoza, and he went on to start six further league games for Ronnie Allen's team, adding four appearances in the Copa del Generalísimo.

In 1971–72 Rojo began to feature regularly for Athletic, and made his European debut against Southampton, featuring the full 90 minutes in the 2–1 away loss in the UEFA Cup. The following season he contributed 37 appearances in all competitions, helping the side to ninth place in the league and victory in the domestic cup, with the player taking the field in the final in Madrid, a 2–0 defeat of CD Castellón.

Over the next four campaigns, Rojo was a frequent midfield presence. In 1976, he was in the side and scored in both legs of a Spanish Cup tie against Sporting de Gijón in which the opponents overturned a 2–0 first leg deficit to win 5–2 at San Mamés. Although the result itself was an embarrassment, it did prompt the club to pursue the opposition's star player José Ignacio Churruca, who would play an important role for the team in the coming years.

Rojo missed the first half of 1976–77 due to injury, scoring what was to be his final goal for the side in a 3–0 home win over Hércules CF as they ended the league in third place. Athletic also reached the final of the UEFA Cup, losing on the away goals rule to Juventus FC and with him appearing in the first leg, one of his five games in the run; he departed from Bilbao at the age of 29, with overall totals of 186 matches and 12 goals.

=== Racing Santander ===
After signing with Racing de Santander in the summer of 1977, Rojo was a regular in his three seasons in Cantabria, narrowly avoiding top-flight relegation in the first (under Nando Yosu) but finishing second-bottom in the second. After nearly dropping down another level in 1979–80, he retired at 32.

== International career ==
Having never featured at any youth level for Spain, Rojo came to the attention of the selectors due to his form for Athletic. His only cap arrived on 17 October 1973, when he played the entirety of a 0–0 friendly draw in Turkey – his brother also took part in the match.

Previously, Rojo featured for the unofficial Basque Country team in 1971 in a match against Catalonia.

== Honours ==
Athletic Bilbao

- Copa del Generalísimo: 1972–73; runner-up: 1976–77
- UEFA Cup runner-up: 1976–77
