= Javier Escalza =

Spanish footballer

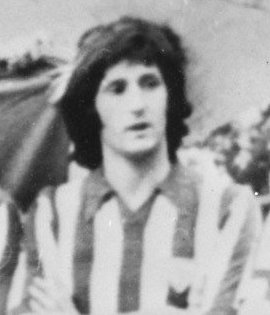
- Escalza in 1977

Personal information
- Full name: Francisco Javier Escalza Ellakuria
- Date of birth: 10 December 1952
- Place of birth: Arrankudiaga, Spain
- Date of death: 16 November 2007 (aged 54)
- Place of death: Getxo, Spain
- Height: 1.77 m (5 ft 10 in)
- Position: Defender

Senior career*
Years	Team	Apps	(Gls)
1970–1971	Villosa		
1972–1973	Barakaldo	24	(1)
1973–1980	Athletic Bilbao	162	(0)
1980–1983	Español	92	(2)
1983–1984	Sabadell		
1984–1987	Sestao	37	(0)

International career
1978	Spain	1	(0)

Managerial career
- 1989–1993: Basconia
- 1994–1995: Cacereño
- 1996: Amurrio
- * Club domestic league appearances and goals

Francisco Javier Escalza Ellakuria (10 December 1952 – 16 November 2007) was a Spanish footballer who played as a defender.

== Club career ==
Born in Arrankudiaga, Biscay, Escalza began playing with amateurs CD Villosa, returning to organized football only two years later with Barakaldo CF in Segunda División. In the following summer, aged 21, he joined Basque giants Athletic Bilbao, making his La Liga debut on 27 April 1974 in a 0–1 away loss against UD Las Palmas, his only appearance of the season.

From there onwards, Escalza became an undisputed starter for the Lions: in the 1976–77 campaign he played 51 official games as the team finished in third position in the league and reached the UEFA Cup final, losing on the away goals rule to Juventus FC.

Escalza left Athletic in June 1980, having appeared in 207 matches all competitions comprised (one goal in the Copa del Rey). He subsequently joined fellow top level side RCD Español, being first-choice over the course of three seasons, and finished his career at the age of nearly 36 after one year with CE Sabadell FC and three with Sestao Sport Club (two seasons in Segunda División B, another two in the second level).

== International career ==
Escalza won one cap with Spain, on 8 November 1978 in a 0–1 loss with France. Additionally, he played three times with the Basque Country regional team.

== Death ==
Escalza died on 16 November 2007 in Getxo, less than one month before celebrating his 55th birthday.
