= Koldo Aguirre =

Spanish footballer and manager (1939–2019)

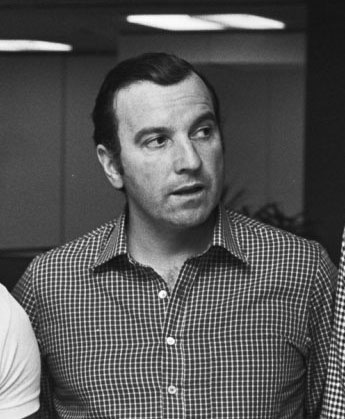
- Aguirre in 1978

Personal information
- Full name: Luis María Aguirre Vidaurrázaga
- Date of birth: 27 April 1939
- Place of birth: Sondika, Spain
- Date of death: 3 July 2019 (aged 80)
- Place of death: Bilbao, Spain
- Height: 1.74 m (5 ft 9 in)
- Position: Midfielder

Youth career
- Sondika
- Getxo

Senior career*
Years	Team	Apps	(Gls)
1957–1969	Athletic Bilbao	231	(44)
1969–1970	Sabadell	3	(0)
1970	Alicante		
Total		234	(44)

International career
1961	Spain B	1	(1)
1961–1965	Spain	7	(0)

Managerial career
- 1970–1971: Erandio
- 1971–1972: Villosa
- 1972–1973: Alavés
- 1974–1975: Basque Country (youth)
- 1975–1976: Bilbao Athletic
- 1976–1979: Athletic Bilbao
- 1979–1982: Hércules
- 1983: Valencia
- 1983: Mallorca
- 1985–1986: Logroñés
- 1988: Lleida
- 1993–1994: Bilbao Athletic
- 1995–1996: Barakaldo
- * Club domestic league appearances and goals

Luis María "Koldo" Aguirre Vidaurrázaga (27 April 1939 – 3 July 2019) was a Spanish football midfielder and manager.

He played for Athletic Bilbao for twelve years, appearing in 297 competitive matches (61 goals scored) and winning two Copa del Rey trophies.

== Club career ==
Born in Sondika, Biscay, Aguirre joined Athletic Bilbao in 1957 at the age of 18 from Basque neighbours CD Getxo, being immediately promoted to the first team. He made his La Liga debut on 19 January 1958 in a 2–1 away loss against Real Zaragoza, and finished his first season with only three matches played; the campaign ended with victory in the Copa del Generalísimo.

Aguirre was a regular starter for Athletic in the following years, scoring a career-best 11 goals in 29 games in 1961–62 to help the side finish in fifth position. On 10 October 1965 he put four past RCD Español in a 4–3 away win in 11 minutes, as the opposition's goalkeeper was former teammate and good friend Carmelo Cedrún. Towards the end of his spell with the Lions, when he was again only a fringe player, he won his second domestic cup, against Elche CF.

In the summer of 1969, aged 30, Aguirre signed with fellow top-division side CE Sabadell FC, retiring halfway through the season after only 115 minutes of action in order to support his family in the wake of the death of his younger brother Iñaki (a goalkeeper with AD Plus Ultra) from leukaemia. He still played some amateur football with Alicante CF, and later worked with Athletic Bilbao as an ambassador with the supporters.

== International career ==
Aguirre earned seven caps for Spain in four years. His debut was on 19 April 1961, in a 2–1 away win against Wales for the 1962 FIFA World Cup qualifiers.

== Coaching career ==
Aguirre began his coaching career in the lower divisions. He returned to his main club Athletic Bilbao as an assistant manager, after having been in charge of the reserves and also of neighbouring Deportivo Alavés; he was promoted to head coach for 1976–77 and, during his three-year spell, the team finished twice in third position, reaching the finals of the Spanish Cup and the UEFA Cup in 1977.

Aguirre then worked three seasons with Hércules CF – also in the top flight – being relegated in his last year, 1981–82. In the following campaign he was one of three managers at Valencia CF, being in charge for the final seven games (three wins, two draws and two losses) as they ranked 15th, the first position above the relegation zone; crucially, they defeated leaders Real Madrid on the final matchday, which meant not only that they stayed up but also that Athletic won the title, his former employers having reciprocated the favour to Valencia by beating UD Las Palmas who finished 16th and went down.

After another brief spell in the main division, with RCD Mallorca, Aguirre returned to the lower leagues, and again managed Bilbao Athletic amongst other sides.

== Death ==
Aguirre died in Bilbao on 3 July 2019, at the age of 80.

== Honours ==
=== Player ===
Athletic Bilbao

- Copa del Generalísimo: 1958, 1969; runner-up: 1965–66, 1966–67

=== Manager ===
Athletic Bilbao

- Copa del Rey runner-up: 1976–77
- UEFA Cup runner-up: 1976–77
