= 1972–73 Copa del Generalísimo =

71st Copa del Rey

Tournament details
- Country: Spain
- Teams: 112

Final positions
- Champions: Athletic Bilbao (22nd title)
- Runners-up: CD Castellón

Tournament statistics
- Matches played: 221

The 1972–73 Copa del Generalísimo was the 71st staging of the Spanish Cup. The competition began on 20 September 1972 and concluded on 29 June 1973 with the final.

== Fourth round ==
Team 1	Agg.	Team 2	1st leg	2nd leg
Cádiz CF	2–3	CD Logroñés	2–2	0–1
CD Cartagena	0–2	CD Sabadell CF	0–2	0–0
Gimnástico de Tarragona	2–6	Baracaldo CF	2–0	0–6
Cultural Leonesa	2–3	Hércules CF	2–0	0–3
RCD Mallorca	1–2	CD San Andrés	1–1	0–1
Pontevedra CF	2–3	Recreativo de Huelva	2–2	0–1
Racing de Santander	2–3	Sevilla CF	1–0	1–3
CD Tenerife	5–6	CD Orense	3–1	2–5
CD Valdepeñas	1–2	Rayo Vallecano	0–0	1–2
Real Valladolid	4–1	Elche CF	3–0	1–1

Source: RSSSF

== Fifth round ==
Team 1	Agg.	Team 2	1st leg	2nd leg
Atlético Madrid	1–2	RCD Español	1–0	0–2
Baracaldo CF	2–4	Real Oviedo	2–1	0–3
CD Castellón	5–1	Real Valladolid	5–0	0–1
Deportivo La Coruña	5–1	Hércules CF	3–1	2–0
Granada CF	3–2	CD Logroñés	1–1	2–1
Recreativo de Huelva	0–2	CF Barcelona	0–0	0–2
UD Las Palmas	0–3	CD Málaga	0–2	0–1
Rayo Vallecano	1–4	Valencia CF	0–1	1–3
Real Sociedad	4–7	CD Orense	1–3	3–4
CD San Andrés	1–1 (2–3 p)	Real Betis	1–0	0–1
Sevilla CF	3-2	Real Zaragoza	1–0	2–2
Sporting Gijón	7–2	CD Sabadell CF	5–1	2–1

Source: RSSSF

- Bye: Real Madrid, Athletic Bilbao, Burgos CF and Celta Vigo.

== Round of 16 ==
Team 1	Agg.	Team 2	1st leg	2nd leg
Athletic Bilbao	2–1	Real Oviedo	2–0	0–1
Real Betis	4–3	Burgos CF	2–1	2–2
CD Castellón	1–0	Valencia CF	0–0	1–0
RCD Español	2–2 (a)	Deportivo La Coruña	1–2	1–0
CD Málaga	2–0	Celta Vigo	2–0	0–0
CD Orense	2–4	Granada CF	1–1	1–3
Sevilla CF	3–2	CF Barcelona	3–1	0–1
Sporting Gijón	2–1	Real Madrid	1–0	1–1

Source: RSSSF

== Quarter-finals ==
Team 1	Agg.	Team 2	1st leg	2nd leg
CD Castellón	4–2	Real Betis	4–0	0–2
Deportivo La Coruña	0–4	CD Málaga	0–2	0–2
Granada CF	1–4	Sporting Gijón	1–1	0–3
Sevilla CF	2–5	Athletic Bilbao	0–0	2–5

Source: RSSSF

== Semi-finals ==
Team 1	Agg.	Team 2	1st leg	2nd leg
Athletic Club de Bilbao	3–1	CD Málaga	2–1	1–0
CD Castellón	3–0	Real Sporting de Gijón	2–0	1–0

Source: RSSSF

== Final ==
Team 1	Score	Team 2
Athletic Club de Bilbao	2–0	CD Castellón

Copa del Generalísimo
winners
Athletic Bilbao
22nd title
