= List of Athletic Bilbao players =

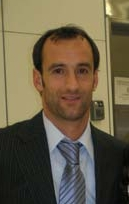
Joseba Etxeberria is ranked 5th for appearances and 18th for goals, as of 2024.

Athletic Bilbao is an association football club based in Bilbao, in Biscay in the Basque Country of Spain. The club was a founder member of the Spanish league, better known as La Liga, in 1928, and has won the league championship eight times. As of 2012, Athletic has played for 82 years in the Primera División, the top tier of Spanish football, and is one of only three clubs, the others being Real Madrid and Barcelona, never to have been relegated from La Liga.

The club is known for its policy of recruiting only players from the greater Basque Country, a region which includes Labourd, Soule and Lower Navarre in France as well as the Spanish provinces of Biscay, Guipúzcoa, Álava and Navarre. This policy, which for many years applied both to signings from other clubs and to youngsters admitted to the club's academy, has in recent years become more flexible, so that players whose career developed in the youth system of other clubs in the region are now acceptable, irrespective of their country of birth.

Athletic won the Copa del Rey three times between 1914 and 1916. The team of that period included the prolific goalscorer Rafael "Pichichi" Moreno; he scored the first goal in the San Mamés Stadium on 21 August 1913, scored a hat-trick in the 1915 Copa del Rey final, and his 89 games for the club produced a total of 78 goals. Since 1953, the top scorer in La Liga each season has been awarded the Pichichi Trophy, named in his honour.

On 29 September 1940, Telmo Zarra played his first league match for the club. During his time at Athletic, he won six Pichichi awards, a league record, and helped the club achieve a league championship and five Copa del Rey trophies. He retired in 1955, having played 352 matches and scored 333 goals. Since 2006, the annual Zarra Trophy is awarded to the highest goalscorer of Spanish nationality in La Liga. Joseba Etxeberria, who joined Athletic from Real Sociedad in 1995 for a record transfer fee of €3 million, is the player with the most appearances for the club in the last 30 years. He signed a one-year extension to his contract in 2009 in which he agreed to play the 2009–10 season unpaid in the hope of reaching 500 games before he retired; he finished the season (and his professional career) on 514.

== Players ==
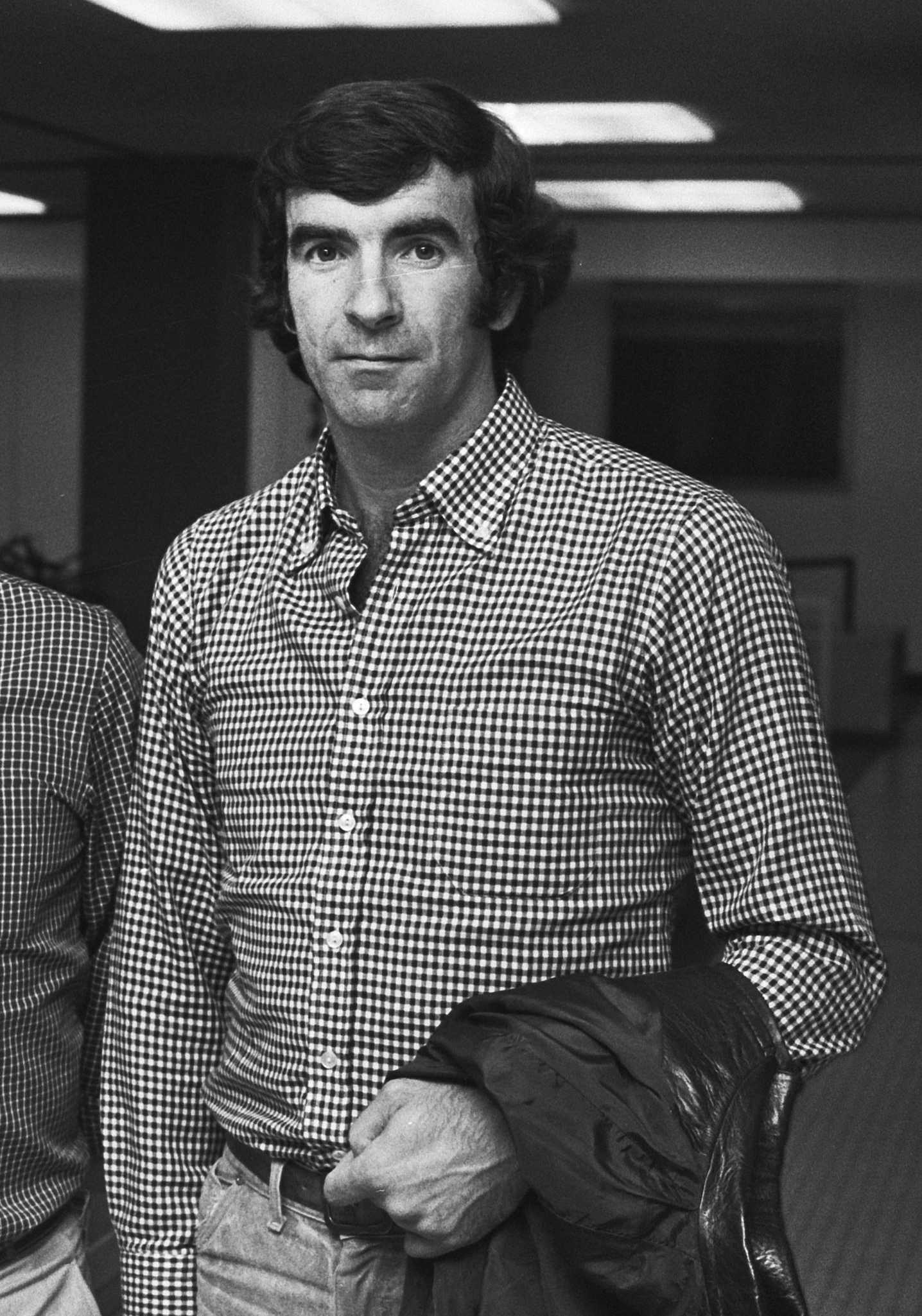
José Ángel Iribar is the Athletic player with the most career appearances.

Appearance and goal totals include matches in La Liga, Copa del Rey, Supercopa de España, UEFA Champions League, UEFA Europa League and regional competitions.^{[NB2]} Substitute appearances are included. Table is initially sorted in descending order of appearances and includes all Athletic players who have made 100 appearances or more.

A statistical analysis by El Correo in 2023 showed that the more historic players at the top of the list had played many more minutes overall than those from the modern era with fewer or no substitutions available – Orúe was on the field for the entirety of all matches he played, with contemporaries Panizo, Gaínza and Canito not doing so only twice apiece, contrasting sharply with the likes of Muniain and Susaeta whose totals for coming on and coming off were each well into the hundreds. On the other hand, the stats do not count the increasingly lengthy stoppage time typically being applied in the 21st century.

=== Key ===
*	Club record holder
Name in italics	Currently playing for Athletic
**Bold**	Record goals or appearances (all competitions)

Name	Pos.^{[NB1]}	Athletic Bilbao career	League App.	League Goals	Cup App.	Cup Goals	Euro (Note: Includes European Cup / UEFA Champions League, UEFA Cup / UEFA Europa League, UEFA Cup Winners' Cup, UEFA Intertoto Cup, Latin Cup and Inter-Cities Fairs Cup) App.	Euro Goals	Other (Note: Includes Copa Presidente FEF, Copa de Oro Argentina, Copa Eva Duarte, Supercopa de España and Copa de la Liga) (Note: Statistics from the regional Biscay Championship have not been included at this time.) App.	Other Goals	Total App.	Total Goals	Notes	Refs
José Ángel Iribar *	GK	1962–1980	466	0	93	0	55	0	0	0	**614**	0	^{[A]}^{[1 Zamora]}	
Óscar de Marcos	DF	2009–2025	435	25	53	4	77	8	8	2	573	39		
Iker Muniain	FW	2009–2024	434	56	65	10	61	10	4	0	560	76		
Txetxu Rojo	FW	1965–1982	414	47	87	16	40	4	0	0	541	67		
Joseba Etxeberria	FW	1995–2010	445	87	41	10	26	6	2	0	514	103		
Iñaki Williams	FW	2014–	407	85	52	16	45	12	6	1	510	114		
Andoni Iraola	DF	2003–2015	406	33	56	2	46	3	2	0	510	38		
Markel Susaeta	MF	2007–2019	379	38	50	6	75	12	3	0	507	56		
Agustín Gaínza	FW	1940–1959	380	117	99	30	8	1	2	0	489	148		
José María Orúe	DF	1950–1951; 1952–1968	391	1	74	0	18	0	0	0	483	1		
Aitor Larrazábal	DF	1990–2004	390	39	37	3	18	1	0	0	445	43		
Canito	DF	1948–1963	354	4	76	1	8	1	2	0	440	6		
Julen Guerrero	MF	1992–2006	372	101	41	11	17	4	–	–	430	116		
Estanislao Argote	FW	1977–1990	332	63	69	12	18	1	9	0	428	76		
Ismael Urzaiz	FW	1996–2007	367	115	34	12	18	1	0	0	419	128		
Aritz Aduriz	FW	2002–2003; 2006–2008; 2012–2020	316	118	41	16	48	34	2	4	407	172		
José Panizo	MF	1938–1955	326	136	79	36	–	–	7	1	412	173		
Carmelo Cedrún	GK	1950–1964	334	0	62	0	8	0	0	0	404	0		
Dani	FW	1974–1986	303	147	68	37	25	11	7	4	403	199		
Josu Urrutia	MF	1987–2003	348	10	39	1	14	0	0	0	401	11		
Mikel San José	DF	2009–2020	304	27	39	3	53	6	1	1	397	37		
Fidel Uriarte	FW	1962–1974	296	90	65	20	33	9	0	0	394	119		
Carlos Gurpegui	MF	2002–2016	313	18	37	1	39	3	4	0	393	22		
Gorka Iraizoz	GK	2007–2017	315	0	28	0	45	0	4	0	392	0		
Manuel Sarabia	FW	1976–1977; 1978–1988	284	84	72	28	17	3	9	4	382	119		
Andoni Goikoetxea	DF	1974–1987	277	35	65	8	23	1	4	0	369	44		
Antón Arieta	FW	1964–1974	265	62	62	15	36	5	0	0	363	82		
Raúl García	MF	2015–2024	292	65	39	10	28	7	4	2	363	84		
Ángel María Villar	MF	1971–1981	291	8	47	2	24	1	0	0	362	11		
Genar Andrinúa	DF	1983–1985; 1986–1997	304	16	39	2	12	3	1	0	356	21		
Zarra *	FW	1940–1955	277	252	74	81	–	–	3	5	354	**338**	^{[B]}^{[6 Pichichi]}	
Francisco Yeste	MF	1998–2010	302	50	32	6	19	3	0	0	353	59		
José Artetxe	FW	1950–1965	276	107	65	24	8	6	1	0	350	137		
Koldo Etxeberria	DF	1961–1972	259	1	54	3	33	1	0	0	346	5		
Santiago Urquiaga	DF	1978–1987	255	3	64	2	18	2	8	0	345	7		
Iñaki Sáez	DF	1962–1974	263	7	50	1	24	0	0	0	337	8		
Agustín Gisasola	DF	1970–1983	258	17	56	4	20	0	0	0	334	21		
Fernando Llorente	FW	2005–2013	262	83	35	16	35	16	1	0	333	115		
José Gallego	MF	1979–1980; 1981–1991	259	14	41	1	21	1	10	1	331	17		
Bittor Alkiza	MF	1994–2003	287	8	25	2	16	0	0	0	328	10		
Rafael Iriondo	FW	1940–1953	257	80	65	33	–	–	9	2	331	115		
Mikel Balenziaga	DF	2008–2009; 2013–2023	246	1	33	0	36	0	6	0	321	1		
Ander Iturraspe	MF	2008–2019	232	3	33	0	54	0	1	0	320	3		
Jesús Aranguren	DF	1962–1975	247	4	44	0	28	0	0	0	319	4		
Pablo Orbaiz	MF	2000–2011	263	10	39	3	14	0	2	0	318	13		
José Argoitia	FW	1960–1972	231	52	53	13	26	3	0	0	310	68		
Koldo Agirre	FW	1957–1970	231	44	56	15	17	4	0	0	304	63		
Patxi Salinas	DF	1982–1992	239	7	44	3	8	0	11	1	302	11		
Eneko Arieta	FW	1951–1966	244	128	46	30	10	4	–	–	300	162		
Jesús Garay	DF	1950–1960	236	7	50	3	8	0	2	0	296	10		
Mauri	FW	1953–1964	245	59	41	13	8	0	0	0	294	72		
Rafael Alkorta	DF	1987–1993; 1997–2002	263	6	21	0	10	0	0	0	294	6		
José Ángel Ziganda	FW	1991–1998	255	77	27	10	9	4	0	0	291	91		
Iñigo Larrainzar	DF	1993–2003	251	6	30	0	8	1	0	0	289	7		
Iñigo Lekue	DF	2015–2026	212	3	33	0	33	1	5	0	282	4		
Ismael Urtubi	MF	1980–1981; 1982–1992	210	28	45	8	14	1	10	0	279	37		
Yuri	DF	2018–	223	10	37	4	15	1	3	0	278	15		
José Larrauri	DF	1965–1974	200	0	53	0	24	0	–	–	277	0		
Carlos	FW	1970–1981	213	81	44	32	19	5	0	0	276	118	^{[1 Pichichi]}	
Nando	DF	1941–1952	213	6	60	0	–	–	3	0	276	6		
Ander Garitano	MF	1987–1996	234	35	33	7	8	0	0	0	275	42		
Mikel Vesga	MF	2016–2018; 2019–2026	211	9	38	1	21	0	5	0	275	10		
Miguel de Andrés	MF	1979–1988	198	9	50	2	12	1	8	0	268	12		
Unai Simón *	GK	2018–	237	0	12	0	9	0	6	0	264	0	^{[1 Zamora]}	
Yeray	DF	2016–	216	3	26	0	19	1	3	1	264	5		
Raimundo Lezama	GK	1941–1957	197	0	64	0	0	0	3	0	264	0	^{[1 Zamora]}	
Carlos García	DF	1992–2003	226	21	27	4	11	0	0	0	264	25		
Álex Berenguer	MF	2020–	208	30	28	6	20	0	6	0	262	36		
Santiago Ezquerro	FW	1998–2005	222	45	23	7	15	5	0	0	260	57		
Javi González	MF	1997–2007	220	9	21	1	13	2	–	–	254	12		
Fernando Amorebieta	DF	2005–2013	195	3	28	1	31	0	0	0	254	4		
Aymeric Laporte	DF	2012–2018; 2025–	186	7	23	2	41	1	2	0	252	10		
José Núñez	DF	1971–1976; 1978–1986	177	2	51	0	13	0	11	0	252	2		
Jesús María Lacruz	DF	1997–2006	224	12	20	0	7	0	0	0	251	12		
Javi Martínez	MF	2006–2012	201	22	25	2	25	2	0	0	251	26		
Manuel Etura	DF	1953–1966	205	2	35	1	7	0	0	0	247	3		
Txema Noriega	FW	1979–1987	183	41	39	11	12	3	11	1	245	56		
Beñat	MF	2006–2007; 2013–2020	182	6	23	2	35	3	2	0	242	11		
Andoni Zubizarreta	GK	1981–1986	169	0	46	0	14	0	16	0	239	0		
José Maguregi	DF	1952–1961	198	35	32	6	7	0	0	0	237	41		
Roberto Bertol	MF	1939–1950	187	0	44	0	–	–	4	0	235	0		
Luis de la Fuente	DF	1980–1987; 1991–1993	168	2	42	1	13	0	11	2	234	5		
Oihan Sancet	MF	2019–	191	42	24	3	13	3	3	0	231	48		
Iñigo Liceranzu	DF	1981–1988	169	17	41	1	15	0	6	0	231	18		
Tiko	MF	1999–2008	198	21	27	5	5	0	0	0	230	26		
Isaac Oceja	DF	1933–1948	186	1	34	0	–	–	6	0	226	1		
José Lasa	MF	1972–1978	177	19	27	2	20	2	0	0	224	23		
Ricardo Mendiguren	FW	1986–1997	193	22	21	1	9	0	0	0	223	23		
Daniel Astrain	DF	1971–1979	182	3	26	0	14	1	0	0	222	4		
Ignacio Uribe	FW	1953–1963	174	57	35	9	5	2	–	–	214	68		
Andoni Lakabeg	DF	1988–1995	192	3	15	0	5	0	0	0	212	3		
Venancio	FW	1944–1947; 1948–1955	167	70	39	21	–	–	2	0	208	93		
Gaizka Toquero	FW	2008–2015	156	20	20	3	29	1	2	0	207	24		
Javier Escalza	DF	1973–1980	162	0	26	1	18	0	0	0	206	1		
Fernando Tirapu	DF	1977–1983	151	3	45	1	8	1	0	0	204	5		
Óscar Vales	DF	1993–1997; 1999–2005	178	1	23	0	3	1	0	0	204	2		
Aitor Karanka	DF	1993–1998; 2002–2006	182	4	13	0	7	0	0	0	202	4		
Nico Williams	FW	2021–	162	22	23	9	16	5	3	1	199	37		
Juanjo Valencia	GK	1992–1999	172	0	17	0	6	0	0	0	195	0		
Dani García	MF	2018–	166	1	25	0	–	–	4	0	195	1		
Ibai	FW	2010–2016; 2019–2021	145	13	22	1	23	4	0	0	193	18		
Dani Vivian	DF	2021–	149	8	22	0	17	0	2	0	190	8		
Dani Aranzubia	GK	1999–2008	162	0	23	0	4	0	0	0	189	0		
Manolín	MF	1949–1955	160	7	27	1	–	–	2	0	189	8		
Ander Herrera	MF	2011–2014; 2022–2025	142	7	25	2	22	2	0	0	189	11		
Luis Fernando	MF	1984–1992	157	3	22	0	7	1	2	0	188	4		
Ernesto Valverde	FW	1990–1996	170	43	17	6	1	0	0	0	188	49		
Félix Marcaida	FW	1952–1963	149	69	30	10	8	4	–	–	187	83		
Guillermo Gorostiza *	FW	1929–1936; 1939–1940	140	110	47	37	–	–	0	0	187	147	^{[2 Pichichi*]}	
José Iraragorri	FW	1929–1936; 1946–1949	141	94	46	25	–	–	0	0	187	119		
José Ángel Rojo	MF	1970–1977	143	8	30	3	13	1	0	0	186	12		
Gorka Guruzeta	FW	2018–2019; 2022–	139	37	21	5	17	6	2	0	181	48		
Iñigo Martínez	DF	2018–2023	152	6	21	2	–	–	4	0	177	8		
Miguel Ángel Sola	MF	1980–1985	125	15	37	6	5	2	10	1	177	24		
Mikel Rico	MF	2013–2019	126	10	18	3	31	1	1	0	176	14		
Igor Gabilondo	MF	2006–2012	147	19	17	4	9	1	2	0	175	24		
José Muguerza	DF	1928–1936	129	1	45	2	–	–	0	0	174	3		
Vicente Biurrun	GK	1986–1990	151	0	14	0	8	0	0	0	173	0		
Javier Irureta	MF	1975–1980	136	22	16	4	18	3	0	0	170	29		
Patxi Ferreira	DF	1984–1989; 1997–2000	143	13	14	1	11	0	1	0	169	14		
Roberto	MF	1928–1936	118	10	47	5	–	–	0	0	165	15		
Endika	FW	1980–1987	113	15	36	6	10	1	5	1	164	23		
Felipe	MF	1995–2006	138	3	23	0	2	0	0	0	163	3		
José María Igartua	DF	1968–1975	118	13	30	2	15	1	0	0	163	16		
Gregorio Blasco *	GK	1926–1936	113	0	47	0	–	–	0	0	160	0	^{[3 Zamora*]}	
Francisco Celaya	DF	1941–1951	117	0	42	0	–	–	0	0	159	0		
Ander Murillo	DF	2001–2009	132	1	18	0	7	0	0	0	157	1		
Bata	FW	1929–1936	118	108	38	34	–	–	0	0	156	142	^{[1 Pichichi]}	
Luis Prieto	DF	2002–2008	134	6	11	0	8	0	0	0	153	6		
Lafuente	FW	1925–1934	96	24	57	16	–	–	0	0	153	40		
Iñaki Lafuente	GK	1999–2009	128	0	17	0	6	0	–	–	151	0		
Juan María Zorriqueta	DF	1958–1970	116	12	23	4	12	0	0	0	151	16		
Eduardo Estíbariz	DF	1988–1997	125	2	21	0	2	0	0	0	148	2		
Asier del Horno	DF	2000–2005; 2007–2008	124	13	15	2	8	3	0	0	147	18		
David López	MF	2007–2012	118	12	16	3	9	1	1	0	144	16		
Imanol Etxeberria	GK	1995–2001	120	0	8	0	12	0	0	0	140	0		
Xabi Etxeita	DF	2008–2010; 2013–2018	89	4	19	3	30	1	2	0	140	8		
Francisco Gárate	FW	1935–1946	105	44	25	10	–	–	5	1	135	55		
Félix Zubiaga	DF	1964–1975	106	18	21	3	5	0	0	0	132	21		
Unai Nuñez	DF	2017–2022; 2024–2025	109	2	13	1	7	0	2	0	131	3		
Iñigo Ruiz de Galarreta	MF	2011–2013; 2023–	92	2	11	0	26	0	1	0	130	2		
Xabier Eskurza	MF	1989–1994	114	7	16	1	0	0	0	0	130	8		
Chirri II	FW	1927–1935	90	31	38	11	–	–	0	0	128	42		
José María Amorrortu	FW	1973–1978	99	7	12	2	16	1	0	0	127	10		
Serafín Areta	DF	1949–1957	111	4	16	0	0	0	0	0	127	4		
Asier Villalibre	FW	2016–2017; 2019–2024	102	11	21	9	2	0	2	1	127	21		
Aitor Paredes	DF	2022–	92	6	12	0	17	1	2	0	123	7		
Victor Unamuno	FW	1928–1933; 1939–1942	86	72	30	20	–	–	6	5	122	97		
Isidoro Urra	MF	1935–1946	96	9	21	0	–	–	3	1	120	10		
Iago Herrerín	GK	2013–2016; 2017–2021	56	0	26	0	37	0	0	0	119	0		
Aitor Ocio	DF	2001–2003; 2007–2012	95	2	17	0	6	0	1	0	119	2		
Óscar Tabuenka	DF	1990–1998	98	6	17	1	3	0	0	0	118	7		
Unai Gómez	MF	2023–2026	83	4	12	1	20	1	2	0	117	6		
José Ramón Alexanko	DF	1976–1980	91	8	15	0	10	0	0	0	116	8		
Iñaki Churruca	FW	1976–1980	85	19	17	5	13	2	0	0	115	26		
Ander Capa	DF	2018–2023	96	5	14	0	–	–	2	0	112	5		
Jon Andoni Goikoetxea	MF	1994–1998	92	1	14	0	6	0	0	0	112	1		
José María Castellanos	DF	1928–1934	79	0	33	0	–	–	0	0	112	0		
Pedro Uralde	FW	1987–1990	96	34	10	3	4	4	0	0	110	41		
José Ramón Betzuen	DF	1966–1973	79	5	21	0	10	2	0	0	110	7		
Juan Garizurieta	MF	1927–1934	74	3	35	0	–	–	0	0	109	3		
Hermenegildo Elices	FW	1933–1936; 1939–1944	77	26	26	11	–	–	6	8	109	45		
Juan José Mieza	DF	1935–1946; 1940–1946	77	0	26	0	–	–	6	0	109	0		
Mikel Jauregizar	MF	2023–	77	4	10	1	18	1	2	0	107	6		
Julio Salinas	FW	1982–1986	68	13	25	11	4	4	8	1	105	29		
Jon Aurtenetxe	DF	2009–2013; 2014–2015	72	2	15	1	18	2	0	0	105	5		
Armando Merodio	FW	1955–1963	88	35	10	1	6	3	0	0	104	39		
Ustaritz	DF	2005–2011	85	1	12	0	4	0	2	0	103	1		
Javi Luke	FW	1990–1995	82	12	19	6	0	0	0	0	101	18		
Luis María Zugazaga	DF	1964–1971	63	0	23	0	15	0	0	0	101	0		
Higinio Ortúzar	MF	1939–1943	70	0	24	0	–	–	6	0	100	0		

=== Club captains ===
Listed below are all the captains of Athletic Bilbao since football became professional in Spain with the introduction of La Liga in 1929.

Period	Captain	Position	One Club Man
1929–1934	Lafuente	FW	
1934–1936	José Iraragorri	FW	
1939–1942	Victorio Unamuno	FW	
1942–1948	Isaac Oceja	DF	
1948–1950	Roberto Bertol	MF	
1950–1955	José Luis Panizo	FW	
1955–1959	Agustín Gainza	FW	
1959–1963	Canito	DF	
1963–1965	José Luis Artetxe	FW	
1965–1968	José Orúe	DF	
1968–1969	Koldo Aguirre	MF	
1969–1972	Koldo Etxeberria	DF	
1972–1974	Iñaki Sáez	DF	
1974–1980	José Ángel Iribar	GK	
1980–1982	Txetxu Rojo	FW	
1982–1986	Dani	FW	
1986–1987	Andoni Goikoetxea	DF	
1987–1988	Manuel Sarabia	FW	
1988–1990	Estanislao Argote	FW	
1990–1991	Txetxu Gallego	MF	
1991–1992	Ismael Urtubi	MF	
1992–1995	Genar Andrinua	DF	
1995–2006	Julen Guerrero	MF	
2006–2010	Joseba Etxeberria	FW	
2010–2011	Pablo Orbaiz	MF	
2011–2016	Carlos Gurpegi	MF	
2016–2017	Gorka Iraizoz	GK	
2017–2019	Markel Susaeta	MF	
2019–2024	Iker Muniain	FW	
2024–2025	Óscar de Marcos	DF	
2025–	Iñaki Williams	FW	

Note: One club man; played for the club throughout his professional career.

== Notes ==
- NB1. For a full description of positions see football positions.
- NB2. Regarding regional competitions; Athletic Bilbao competed in the Basque Cup and Biscay Championship until 1940.
- Pichichi. ^{a} ^{b} ^{c} ^{d} Won the Pichichi Trophy while at Athletic. Gorostiza was the first Athletic player to receive the trophy with 19 goals. Zarra holds the joint-record (with Messi) for most Pichichis in La Liga with six.
- Zamora. ^{a} ^{b} ^{c} Won the Zamora Trophy while at Athletic. Blasco was the first Athletic player to receive the trophy. Blasco also has the record of most Zamora trophies won by a single Athletic player, with three.
- A. Iribar had the most appearances in La Liga, with 466, and overall, with 614, for Athletic.
- B. Zarra is La Liga's 3rd highest goalscorer with 251 goals, behind Lionel Messi and Cristiano Ronaldo. He has the record for most goals scored in all competitions, with 333, for Athletic.

== See also ==
- List of Basque footballers
