= History of Athletic Bilbao =

Spanish football club

Athletic Bilbao is a Spanish football club from Bilbao, Biscay in the Basque Country.

In addition to winning several national league titles and domestic cups since their formation at the start of the 20th century, the club is perhaps best known for their policy of only signing players who have a link to their home territory, and for being one of only three clubs to have participated in every league season without being relegated, despite the restrictions of the policy.

== Background ==
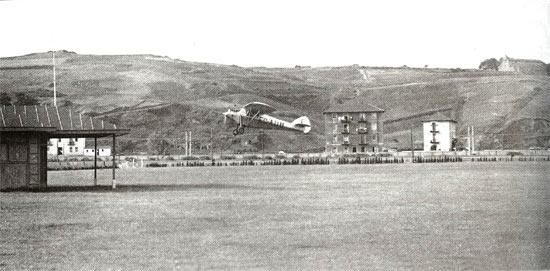
The Lamiako field in the 1930s.

Football was introduced to Bilbao by two distinct groups of players, both with British connections: British steel and shipyard workers and Basque students returning from schools in Britain.

In the late 19th century, Bilbao was a leading port in an important industrial area with iron mines and shipyards nearby, such as the Nervión Shipyards, located in Sestao (Vizcaya). In 1889, its British employees formed a multi-sports entity called Club Atleta, who played the first known football match in Bilbao on 4 April 1890 in a game between the club's members, and soon, they began to play against crews of English ships carrying miners from Southampton, Portsmouth and Sunderland. Along with the coal, the British miners and shipyard workers brought with them (as in so many other parts of the world) football. These first matches were held on a field known as La Campa de los Ingleses, but it was at the Campo de Lamiako where football took off in Bilbao, with several Bilbainos swarming the field to watch the teams of British workers challenge each other every weekend, and The local population also began to play the sport.

Meanwhile, sons of the Basque educated classes had made the opposite journey and went to Britain to complete their studies in civil engineering and commerce. While in the United Kingdom, these students developed an interest in football, and on their return to Bilbao, they began to arrange football games at Lamiako, with an early example of this coming in the spring of 1894, when some Bilbaínos faced an eleven of English residents in Bilbao in the morning of 3 May, ending in a 5–0 victory for the British. The result did not discourage the local population, who continued their newfound love affair with the British sport, began taking root in the city, and soon it gained followers among members belonging to the Gimnásio Zamacois, among whom a certain Juan Astorquia stood out.

== Origins ==
In 1898, Juan Astorquia, together with six fellow Basque football enthusiasts and Lamiako usuals who also belonged to the Gimnásio Zamacois (some of whom had recently returned from Britain), decided to open a football practice center in Lamiako. The seven were Juan Astorquia, Alejandro Acha, Fernando and Pedro Iraolagoitia, Enrique Goiri, Eduardo Montejo and Luis Márquez, and this group would later become Athletic Bilbao. Gimnásio Zamacois, the largest sports center in Bilbao at that time, and the Velocipedista Club, where Astorquia maintained friendships due to his militancy as a member, inevitably became the main sources of recruitment, and thus, once he added a sufficient number of volunteers, he began to arrange and organize matches of the game they loved against the British workers, which were contested on Sundays in Lamiako. This group of football pioneers led by Astorquia, who wore a white and blue shirt divided into two halves with dark blue pants and whose training sessions were held in Getxo's Campa de Santa Eugenia, was almost entirely made of players from Biscay, with a mix of newcomers from the world of cycling.

Two years later, on 30 November 1900, Carlos Castellanos and his brother Manuel, together with a group of young Bilbainos from the upper class who had studied in England and learned about football there, founded the Bilbao Football Club in the Biscayan neighborhood of Algorta. The new Bilbao FC was officially established shortly after its foundation since its regulations were approved by the civil governor and printed in 1901. A few months later, in February 1901, at a meeting held at the Café García, that group of football pioneers in Lamiako, now larger, and probably encouraged by the first news about the founding of Bilbao FC, began conversations to officially establish a football club, so a commission was formed (made up of Goiri, Astorquia, and José María Barquín) with the intention of preparing regulations for a football society, and this regulation was approved on 11 June. The entity's Board was then elected, with Luis Márquez being appointed the first president of the club, Barquín as treasurer and Goiri as its secretary, while Astorquia and Alfred Mills were named the team's captain and vice-captain. The most logical name for a new football club founded in Bilbao (Bilbao Football Club) was already "taken", so the name they chose was Athletic Club, using the English spelling. The name is an apparent homage to the Club Atleta of the Nervión Shipyards (1889–94), and it might have been Mills who proposed it since he played against Club Atleta.

After obtaining the permission of the Civil Government, the Club was officially established on 5 September 1901, in the infamous meeting held at Café García, in which the 33 members decided to make it official and register as a sports organization with the local council. Among those 33 men were the 7 original founders, Juan Astorquia's brother, Luis, Alejandro Acha and Luis Silva, who started playing football in the French town of Bayonne, Goiri and Barquín, former students from St Joseph's College, Dumfries, Alejandro de la Sota, a footballer who started at Plymouth, Gregorio Eguren, who had played in Manchester and later the Portuguese Perico Larrañaga, who trained as a footballer in Newcastle upon Tyne, as well as Alfred Edward Mills, who was the only foreign-born person among the 33 who signed the documents.

In 1902, Juan Astorquia became the club's second president, taking over from Luis Márquez. The club's foundation date is a subject of debate among football historians. The club itself declares 1898, but others claim 1901 as the true founding year due to Athletic's first board meeting held in the Café García, and others claim 1903, when Athletic merged with Bilbao Football Club, with the side that emerged from the unification being called Athletic Club de Bilbao.

== Club Bizcaya ==
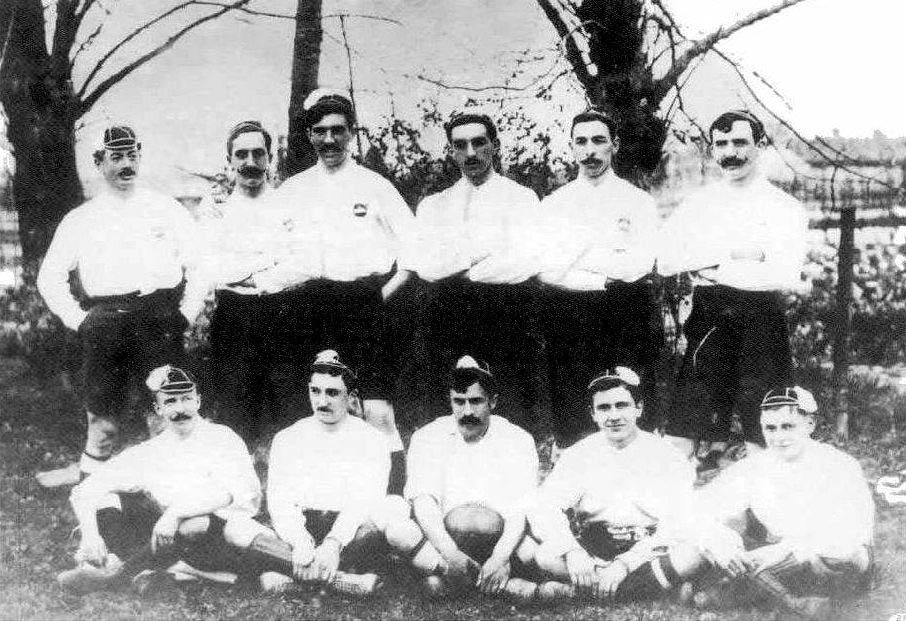
Players of Club Vizcaya, the combined team of Bilbao FC and Athletic Club.

At the end of 1901, the two most important clubs in the city were Athletic Club and Bilbao FC, and thus, a rivalry soon arose between them, playing several friendlies at the Hippodrome of Lamiako, which the two teams shared since there were hardly any fields in Bilbao. Their duels aroused great expectation and served as one of the drivers of football as a mass phenomenon in Bilbao. Despite the sporting rivalry between them, they had good relations, and thus, the two rivals agreed to join the best players of each club to play two games against the Bordeaux-based side Burdigala. This temporary merge became known as Club Bizcaya (with a B), and they beat Burdigala 2–0 in France, the first time a Bilbao team played on foreign territory, and 7–0 in Lamiako, the very first visit by a foreign team to Bilbao, gathering a crowd of three thousand spectators, a tremendous amount at the time.

In 1902, Club Bizcaya participated in the 1902 Copa de la Coronación, the forerunner to the Copa del Rey. They returned with the trophy after defeating FC Barcelona 2–1 in the final with goals from the captain Juan Astorquia and French Armand Cazeaux, both of Athletic. Juan Astorquia used Bizcaya FC's successful campaign to convince Luis Arana of how necessary it was to merge the two clubs. Furthermore, the owners of Bilbao FC began to lose interest in their team, which at the end of 1902 was going through a certain institutional crisis, and so, on 24 March 1903, Bilbao FC and its associates were officially and definitively absorbed by Athletic Club. In the same year, Basque students also formed an affiliated team, Athletic Club Madrid, after watching the team triumph in the 1903 Copa del Rey Final; this club later evolved into Atlético Madrid.

== Copa del Rey ==
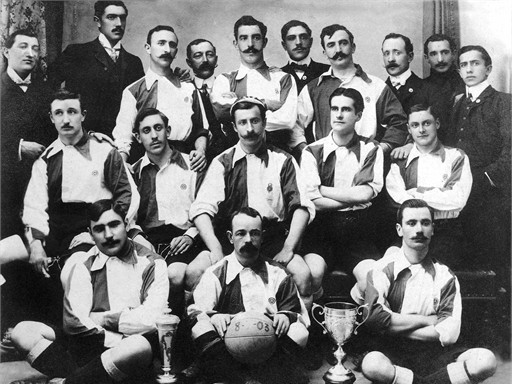
Athletic Club with the first Copa del Rey in 1903.

The club featured prominently in early Copa del Rey competitions. Following the inaugural win by Club Bizcaya, the newly formed Athletic Bilbao won it again in 1903, winning the final with a comeback 3–2 win over Madrid FC, the Athletic goalscorers being Armand Cazeaux, Eduardo Montejo and Alejandro de la Sota. In 1904, they were declared winners after their opponents, Club Español de Madrid, failed to turn up. In 1907, they revived the name Club Bizcaya for the 1907 Copa del Rey. After a brief lull, they won the competition again in 1911 after beating CD Español 3–1. The first time that Athletic wears red and white was on 9 January 1910 in a match against Sporting de Irún.

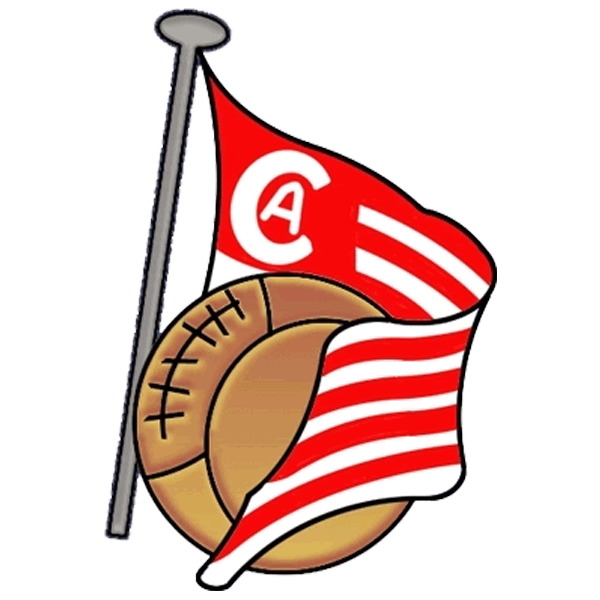
Athletic Club crest of 1913.

In 1911, former player and team captain Alejandro de la Sota, the match winner of the first Copa del Rey in 1903, was elected as the 7th president of the club, and under his leadership, Athletic Club achieved its greatest economic and sporting successes, getting the funds for the construction of the San Mamés Stadium, which opened in 1913, becoming one of the symbols of Athletic's dominance on the national level in the 1910s, winning the Copa del Rey three times in a row between 1914 and 1916. The star of this team was Pichichi, a prolific goalscorer who scored the very first goal in the San Mamés stadium on 21 August 1913 and a hat-trick in the 1915 final, before dying aged just 29 in 1922. Today, the La Liga top-scorer is declared the Pichichi in his honour. After a five-year hiatus, they won it again in 1921 with a 4–1 victory over Athletic Madrid, courtesy of two braces from José María Laca and Domingo Acedo.

== The first La Liga ==
Athletic Club's finishing positions since 1929. They are one of three clubs that have been present in every top flight season

In 1920, when Spain made their international debut at the 1920 Summer Olympics, Athletic provided the squad with three players: José María Belauste, Domingo Acedo and Pichichi, the former two scoring the two goals of a 2-1 win over Sweden and the latter scoring in the Silver/Bronze medal match which Spain won 3–1 over the Netherlands on 5 September 1920. Athletic were not the only Basque team represented in the 1920 squad. Other clubs such as Real Unión, Arenas Club de Getxo and Real Sociedad also provided players. These four clubs were all founding members of La Liga in 1928 and by 1930 they were joined by CD Alavés. This meant that five of the ten clubs in the Primera División of Spain's national league were from the Basque Country. The saying "Con cantera y afición, no hace falta importación", translated as "With home-grown teams and supporters, there is no need for imports", made sense during these early days.

== The Fred Pentland era ==
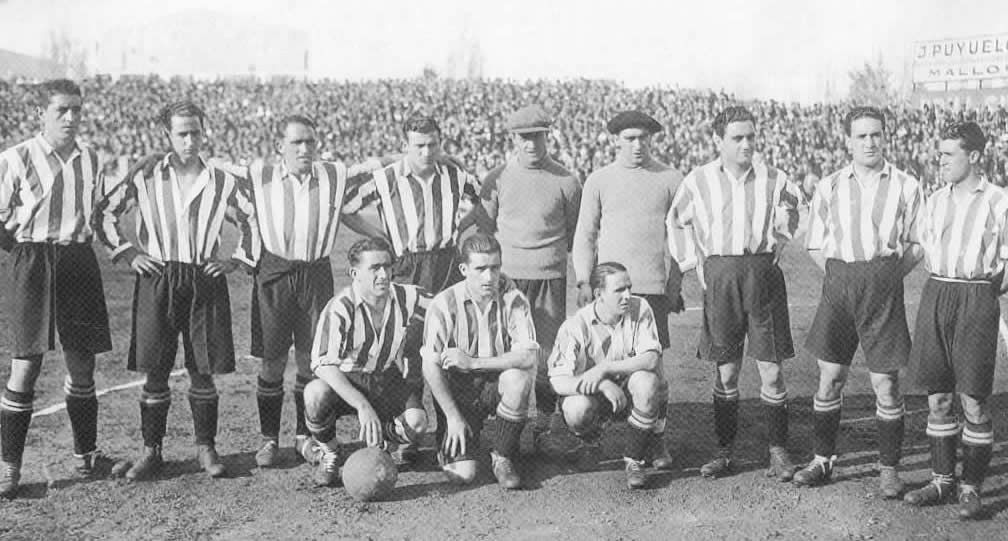
1930-31 La Liga winner team

In 1921, a new British coach, Fred Pentland, arrived from Racing de Santander. In 1923, he led the club to victory in the Copa del Rey, beating CE Europa 1-0 in the final thanks to a goal from Travieso. Pentland revolutionised the way Athletic played, favouring the short-passing game. In 1927, he left Athletic and coached Athletic Madrid, Real Oviedo and the Spain national team. In 1929, he rejoined Athletic and subsequently led the club to La Liga/Copa del Rey doubles in 1930 and 1931. The club won the Copa del Rey four times in a row between 1930 and 1933 and they were also La Liga runners-up in 1932 and 1933. In 1931, Athletic also defeated Barcelona 12–1, which still stands as the latter's worst-ever defeat.

== The league title under Garbutt ==
Athletic's success under British coaches continued with the arrival of William Garbutt from Napoli which made it to the top three in the Italian Serie A under his command for the first time in the club's history in 1932–33 and again in 1933–34. He had previously won the scudetto three times with Genoa and as a result arrived in Spain in 1935 as a well-respected coach, despite his reputation being non-existent in his native England. His first season in Spain was a massive success as he won the Liga that year. He had inherited a talented squad that included strikers Guillermo Gorostiza, La Liga's top scorer in 1930 and 1932, and Bata, the top scorer in 1931. The year prior to Garbutt's appointment was not a success for the club; they club only finished fourth (in 1934–35) despite having been the 1933–34 winners.

Garbutt set about galvanizing what was an already strong Athletic into action, which included promoting the young Ángel Zubieta to the first team, a player who at 17 years of age went on to become the youngest ever to play for the Spain national team at the time. Garbutt's first game was a 3–3 draw away at Oviedo on 10 November 1935, but he followed this up the next weekend with a 7–0 victory over Betis Balompié, who were the reigning champions. Garbutt's success continued with a 1–0 victory over Real Madrid on 12 January 1936, a significant victory as the two teams played "cat and mouse" over the following weeks in the race for the title. In the final game of the season, the title was decided when Athletic defeated Oviedo 2–0 at home on 19 April 1936, winning the title just two points clear of Real Madrid. This marked the return to success for the Athletic Club in a season which brought them their fourth title, and where Bata was the second top scorer with 21 goals. In July 1936, a mere three months after the end of the season, football halted due to the outbreak of the Spanish Civil War. The league did not restart until the 1939–40 season. Athletic Club did not win the title again until 1943 and by that time Garbutt had been exiled by Mussolini's fascists in Italy after having returned to coach Genoa in Serie A.

== Atlético Bilbao ==
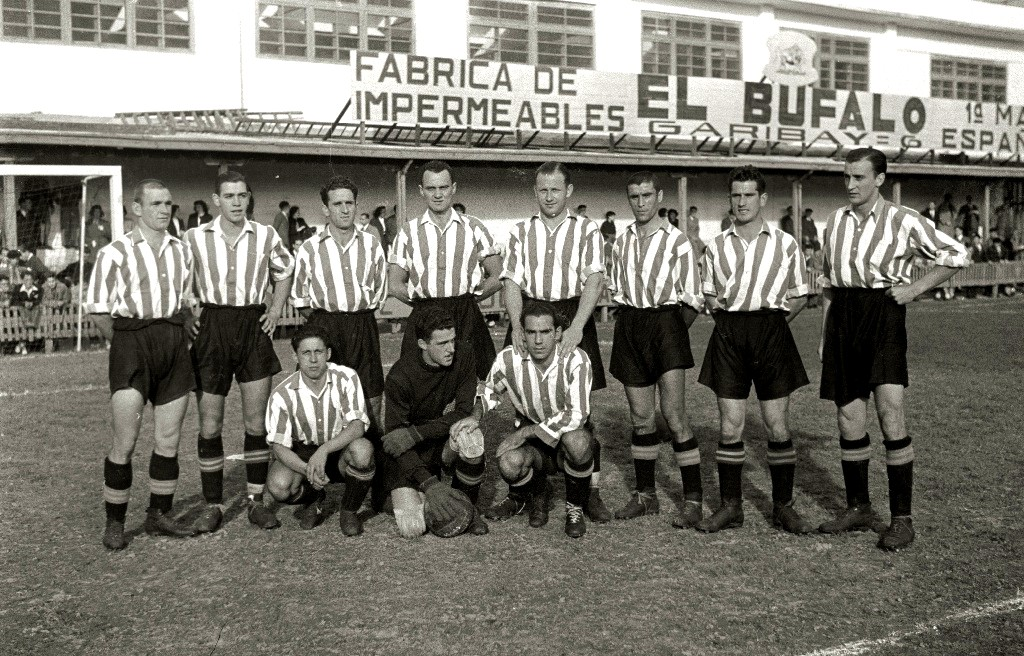
Basque derby of 1944, Real Sociedad vs. Athletic de Bilbao in the Atotxa stadium.

In 1941, the club changed its name to Atlético Bilbao, following a decree issued by Franco, banning the use of non-Spanish language names and scrapping the policy of only letting Basque-born players in the team (see origins of the "grandparent rule"). The same year also saw Telmo Zarra make his debut. Over the next 13 seasons, he went on to score 294 goals in all competitions for Atlético, plus another 20 international goals for Spain in as many games. His 38 goals in the 1950–51 season stood as a record for 60 years before ultimately being broken by Real Madrid's Cristiano Ronaldo. Another great player from this era was José Luis Panizo.

In 1943, the club won a double of Liga and Copa del Generalisimo (the new name of the Copa del Rey) and they subsequently retained the Copa in both 1944 and 1945. During the early 1950s, the club featured the legendary forward line of Zarra, Panizo, Rafa Iriondo, Venancio and Agustín Gaínza. They helped the club win another Copa del Generalisimo in 1950. The arrival of coach Ferdinand Daučík improved the club's fortunes further. He led the team to another double in 1956 and to further Copa del Generalisimo victories in 1955 and 1958. In 1956 the club also made their debut in the European Cup, eventually being knocked out by Manchester United.

What helped the club succeed in the 1930s, 1940s and 1950s were the strict limits imposed on foreign players. In most cases, clubs could only have three foreign players in its squad, meaning that at least eight local players had to play in every game. While Real Madrid and Barcelona circumvented these rules by playing dual citizens such as Alfredo Di Stéfano, Ferenc Puskás, José Santamaría and Ladislao Kubala, Atlético adhered strictly to their cantera policy, showing little or no flexibility. The 1960s, however, were dominated by Real Madrid, and Atlético only had a single Copa del Rey win in 1969. Like international teams, the club has used the "grandparent rule", allowing the recruitment of some players of Basque descent. This enabled the Barcelona-born Armando Merodio to play for the club. During the 1960s, however, other players such as Chus Pereda, Miguel Jones and José Eulogio Gárate were overlooked. Although none of them were Basques by birth, all three grew up in the Basque Country and could be classified as naturalised Basques; Gárate even had Basque parents. On a positive note, the 1960s saw the emergence of a club legend José Ángel Iribar.

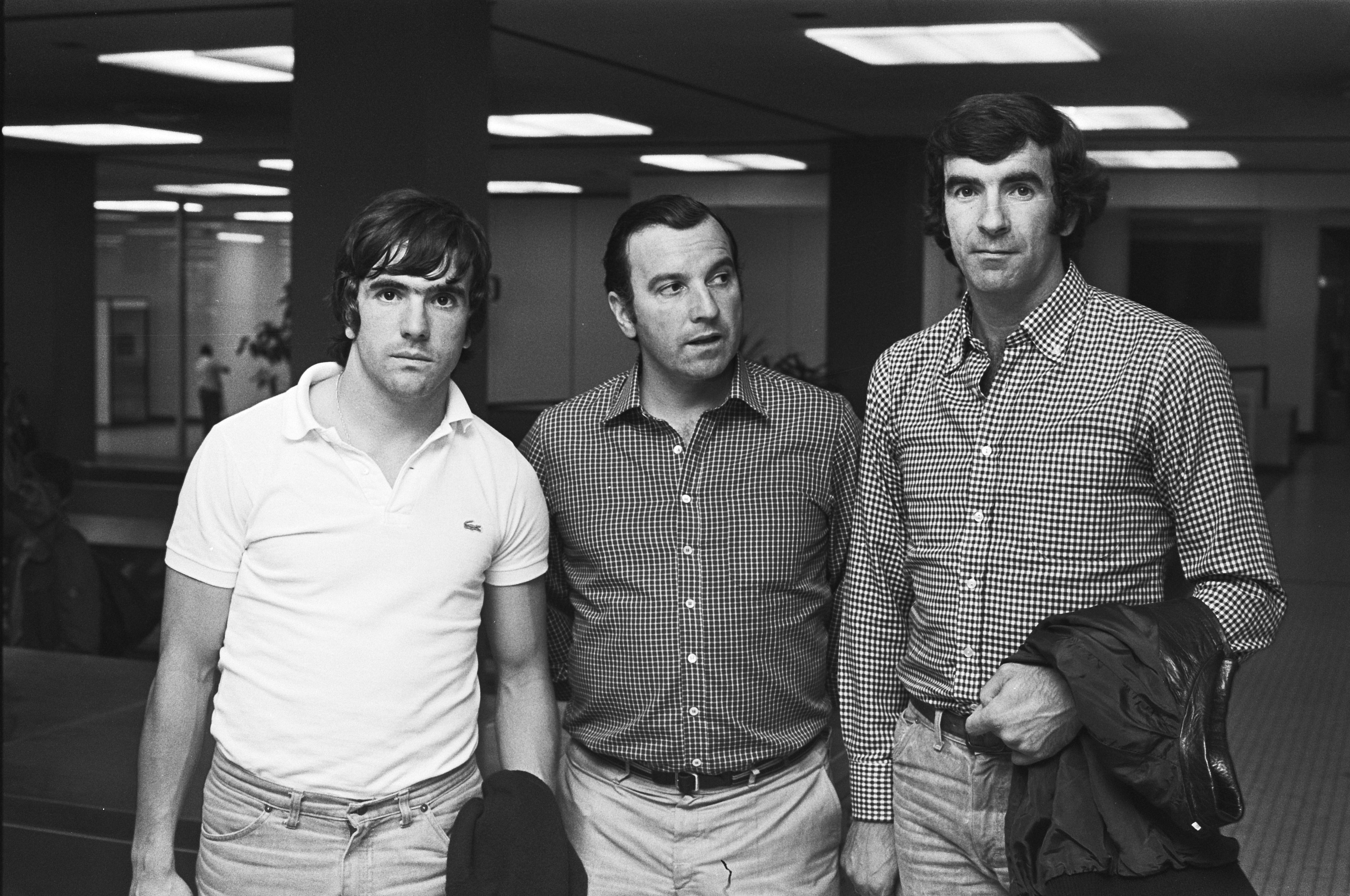
Important 1970s-era players Dani (L) and Iribar (R) along with coach Aguirre (C)

The 1970s were not much better, with only another single Copa del Rey win in 1973. In December 1976, before a game against Real Sociedad, Iribar and Sociedad captain Inaxio Kortabarria carried out the Ikurriña, the Basque flag, and placed it ceremonially on the centre-circle – this was the first public display of the flag since the death of Francisco Franco. In 1977, the club reached the final of the UEFA Cup, only losing on away goals to Juventus. By then the Franco regime also ended and the club reverted to using the name Athletic.

== The Clemente years ==
In 1981, the club appointed Javier Clemente as manager. He soon set about putting together one of the most successful Athletic Bilbao teams in the club's history. Young players from the cantera such as Santiago Urquiaga, Miguel de Andrés, Ismael Urtubi, Estanislao Argote and Andoni Zubizarreta joined veterans Dani and Andoni Goikoetxea. In his first season in charge, Clemente led the team to fourth place in La Liga. In 1983, the club won La Liga, and in 1984, they won a La Liga/Copa del Rey double. In 1985 and 1986, Athletic finished third and fourth, respectively. Clemente's Athletic acquired notoriety for its aggressive style of play, personified by hard-man Goikoetxea. He favoured two defensive midfielders playing in front of twin centre backs and a sweeper, and as a result, critics regarded his teams as dour but effective. Athletic has failed to win a major trophy since the success of the Clemente era. A succession of coaches that included José Ángel Iribar, Howard Kendall, Jupp Heynckes, Javier Irureta, Marcelo Bielsa, Ernesto Valverde and even a returning Clemente failed to reproduce his success.

== The Fernández era ==
One of the most successful Athletic coaches since Clemente's tenure was Luis Fernández, appointed in 1996. In 1998, he led the club to second in La Liga and UEFA Champions League qualification. Fernández benefited from the club adopting a more flexible approach to the cantera. Now anybody could play for Athletic, just as long as they acquired their skills in the Basque Country. Thus, Patxi Ferreira from Salamanca and Biurrun, a Brazilian-born player who immigrated to the region at a young age, played for the club in the late 1980s. Despite this new approach, their definition of a Basque is still open to interpretation, with both Roberto López Ufarte and Benjamín being overlooked despite having Basque parents.

Fernández signed Bixente Lizarazu (the first French-born Basque to join the club), Ismael Urzaiz (from Tudela in southern Navarre but trained at Real Madrid's La Fabrica academy), and José Mari García and Santiago Ezquerro (Osasuna youth graduates born in La Rioja). Athletic also began to recruit players from the canteras of other Basque clubs, leading to allegations of poaching. In 1995, Athletic signed Joseba Etxeberria from regional rivals Real Sociedad, causing considerable bad feeling between the two clubs. Although Lizarazu left after one season, Urzaiz, José Mari and Etxeberria were prominent members of the 1997–98 squad, along with the returning Rafael Alkorta, Ferreira and regular stalwart Julen Guerrero. In May 1998, Athletic played against the Brazil national team to mark the club's centenary, with the South Americans putting out a full-strength team as they prepared to defend their status as title holders at the upcoming World Cup in France.

== The "black biennium" ==
After Jupp Heynckes' second cycle in charge as manager (2001–2003), and Ernesto Valverde's first (2003–2005), the club was embroiled in a relegation battle during the 2005–06 and 2006–07 seasons. In 2006, top-flight survival was ensured on the 37th match day when Deportivo de La Coruña were beaten at the Estadio Riazor 2–1. Javier Clemente then began his third spell as club coach in 2005, when the club were last in the table. He is widely acknowledged to have brought defensive stability to the team, and so is also credited with having saved the club from relegation. Despite this, he was not left in charge for the 2006–07 season, which turned out to be the worst in the club's history; top-flight survival was ensured on the last match day when Levante were beaten at San Mamés 2–0, a result which was alleged a few years later to have been rigged.

== The Caparrós era ==
In the 2008–09 season, Athletic again achieved unspectacular results and finished in mid-table, though they ensured safety from relegation earlier than in the previous campaigns. In the Copa del Rey, however, the team pulled through some tough ties, including local rivals Osasuna and a strong Sevilla side, to reach their first final in the competition in 24 years. The match in the city of Valencia against Barcelona was a great occasion for the fans, and though they lost 4–1, the result was no disgrace, as the Barcelona side of that season also proved unbeatable in La Liga and the Champions League. Athletic's reward for their efforts was a place in the 'new' UEFA Europa League tournament for the following campaign.

The 2009–10 season saw Athletic make steady progress in the league and in Europe. Decent home form, including a victory over Real Madrid, led to the team sitting comfortably in the top half of the Liga and qualifying from their Europa League group, although poorer performances away from Bilbao meant that a really successful run never materialised. In 2010, the home games often resulted in draws rather than victories, and this also proved to be the case in the Europa League, where a draw at San Mamés against Anderlecht was followed by a heavy defeat in Belgium. Ultimately a promising season delivered little, with Athletic finishing eighth, just outside of the European places. Young stars Javi Martínez, Markel Susaeta and Óscar de Marcos performed well, if inconsistently, providing for main striker Fernando Llorente, while 16-year-old forward Iker Muniain made a successful breakthrough into the squad. At the other end of the career scale, 500-game man Joseba Etxeberria retired after 15 seasons at the club, and Francisco Yeste, who had also played over 300 games, left rather abruptly at the end of the campaign.

The 2010–11 season started positively, with Llorente scoring several times in early games. The team eventually achieved qualification for the Europa League with one match remaining, in 6th place. A defensive crisis led to Borja Ekiza from the B squad being drafted at centre-half, and he retained his place with solid performances. Teenager Iker Muniain started almost every match, and Jon Aurtenetxe claimed the starting place at left-back before a bad injury finished his season early. The signing of Ander Herrera was agreed although he elected to stay with his club Real Zaragoza until the summer as they battled against relegation.

== The Bielsa era ==
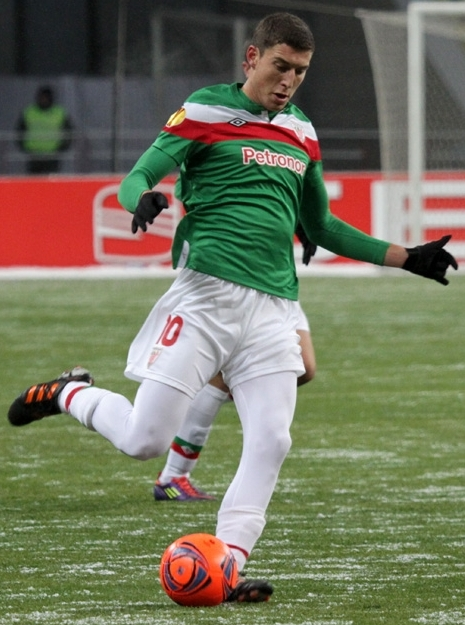
Óscar de Marcos in Moscow

Prior to the 2011–12 season, Athletic's members held their latest presidential election, with incumbent Fernando García Macua defeated by former player Josu Urrutia. One of Urrutia's election pledges had been to bring in former Argentina and Chile head coach Marcelo Bielsa, and he fulfilled this promise. Joaquín Caparrós left as his contract expired, having improved Athletic's stature during his stewardship. Bielsa joined with a reputation for using unconventional formations and tactics. Several players began the campaign playing in unfamiliar positions, including World Cup-winning midfielder Javi Martínez, deployed as a ball-playing central defender and Óscar de Marcos, used in several matches at left-back despite being known as a midfielder.

Initial results were not good and new signing Ander Herrera was injured. The players began to adjust as the season progressed and produced a strong run of autumn form, finishing top of their Europa League group ahead of Paris Saint-Germain. They defeated and defeated Lokomotiv Moscow in the last 32.

Athletic then drew Manchester United and won 3–2 in the first leg at Old Trafford, going on to knock the three-time European champions out of the tournament with an impressive 2–1 victory at home. Fernando Llorente and Óscar de Marcos each scored in both legs. In the quarter-final, they travelled to Schalke 04 of Germany and won the first leg 4–2, despite being 2–1 down on 72 minutes after a Raúl brace. Athletic drew 2–2 in the second leg, going through to the semi-finals to face Sporting CP. They lost the first leg in Portugal 2–1 after initially taking the lead, but beat Sporting 3–1 at home with goals by Markel Susaeta, Ibai Gómez and the winner from Llorente in the 89th minute in front of a fervent home crowd which edged them through to the final, 4–3 on aggregate.

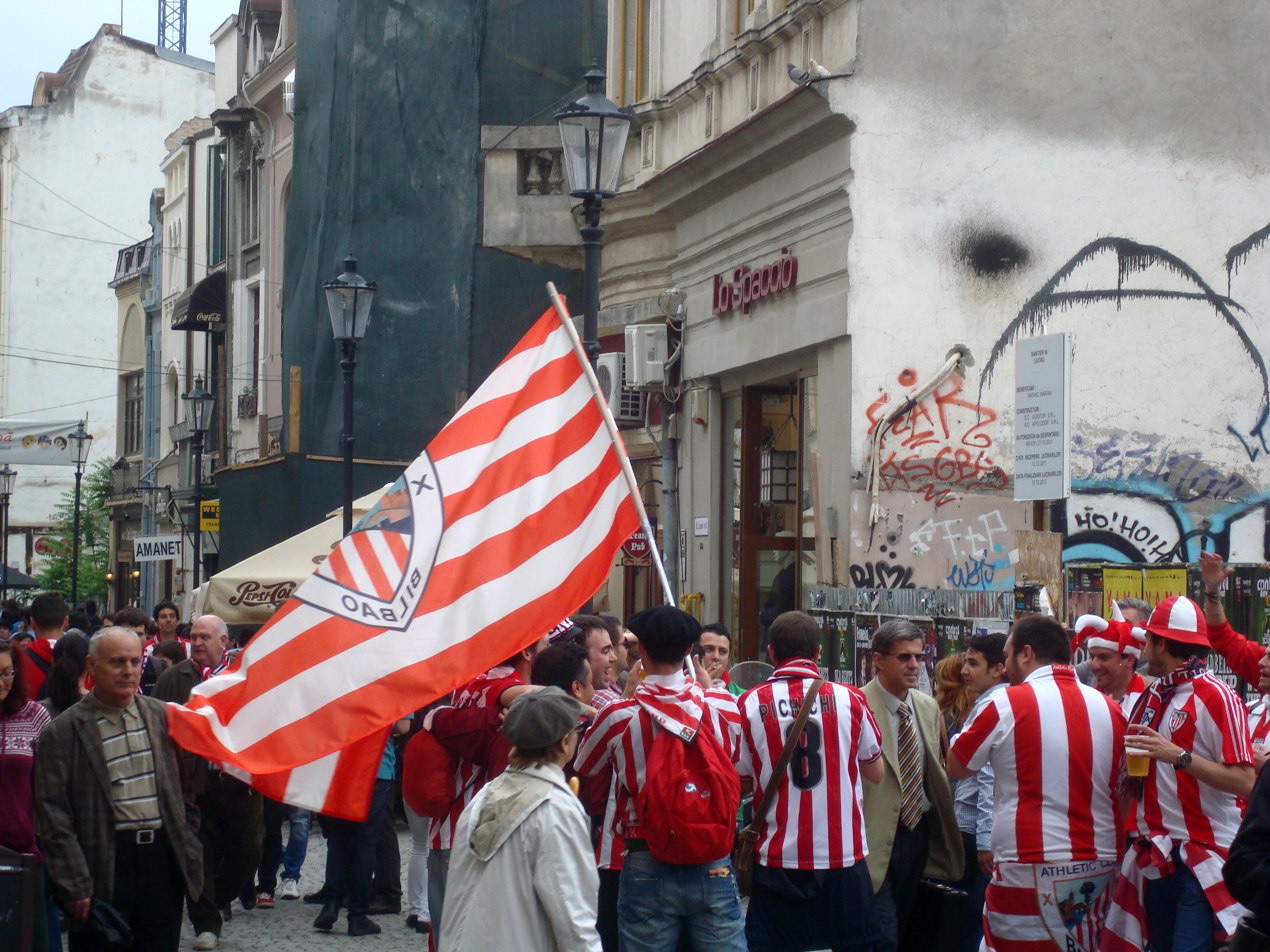
Athletic Bilbao fans in Bucharest before the Europa League final

In their first European final since 1977, Athletic could not maintain their momentum and deliver their first trophy in 28 years, as they lost 3–0 to Spanish rivals Atlético Madrid (inspired by the forward play of Radamel Falcao), on 9 May in the final at the Arena Națională in Bucharest.

Although crushed by this disappointment, there was still another chance to claim glory having reached the 2012 Copa del Rey Final by defeating giant-killers Mirandés. Athletic faced the same opponent in the final as in 2009, Barcelona, who proved too strong in another 3–0 result. Being Copa runners-up meant that Athletic qualified for the 2012–13 UEFA Europa League, even though they ended the league season in tenth place.

Going into the 2012–13 season, Athletic went through a period of some turmoil. The Europa League run meant many top players were being scouted by clubs who could offer higher wages and almost definite Champions League football. Fernando Llorente, whose contract was nearing its end, failed to agree a new deal and it then it emerged that fellow Spain international Javi Martínez possibly wanted to leave as well.

With few replacements available under their signing policy, Athletic took a rigid stance on the matter, whereby no offers would be accepted and players would have to meet their inflated contract buyout clause to leave. Martínez did so, joining Bayern Munich before the transfer deadline despite Athletic's refusal to cooperate. Llorente failed to secure a move despite the bad blood which had developed with the club management over the situation. Marcelo Bielsa also had a major disagreement with the contractors working on improvements to the Lezama training ground. Experienced striker Aritz Aduriz returned from Valencia for a third spell, while winger David López departed.

With this backdrop of uncertainty Athletic began their season with poor results. The possession-based football did not lead to enough goals without the presence of Llorente and the Bielsa tactic of using players regarded as midfielders in defence to boost the overall technique level of the team backfired as opponents created chances with ease.

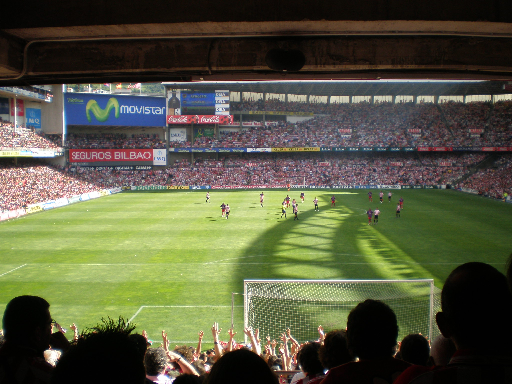
'old' San Mamés in 2007

They were eliminated from the Europa League group stage, failing to beat debutants Hapoel Ironi Kiryat Shmona of Israel at home, and there was further embarrassment as they were knocked out of the Copa del Rey by Basque club Eibar of the third tier. Relegation was a threat until a decent run towards the end of the season, and the final league game at the "old" San Mamés ended in a 0–1 defeat to Levante. Athletic would soon be playing in a new stadium, San Mamés Barria, albeit in a partially completed state.

Bielsa promoted young French defender Aymeric Laporte into the side as a potential replacement for Fernando Amorebieta and he later signed a long-term contract with the club. Fernando Llorente, who played only a peripheral role, eventually completed a free transfer to Juventus.

== The Valverde era ==
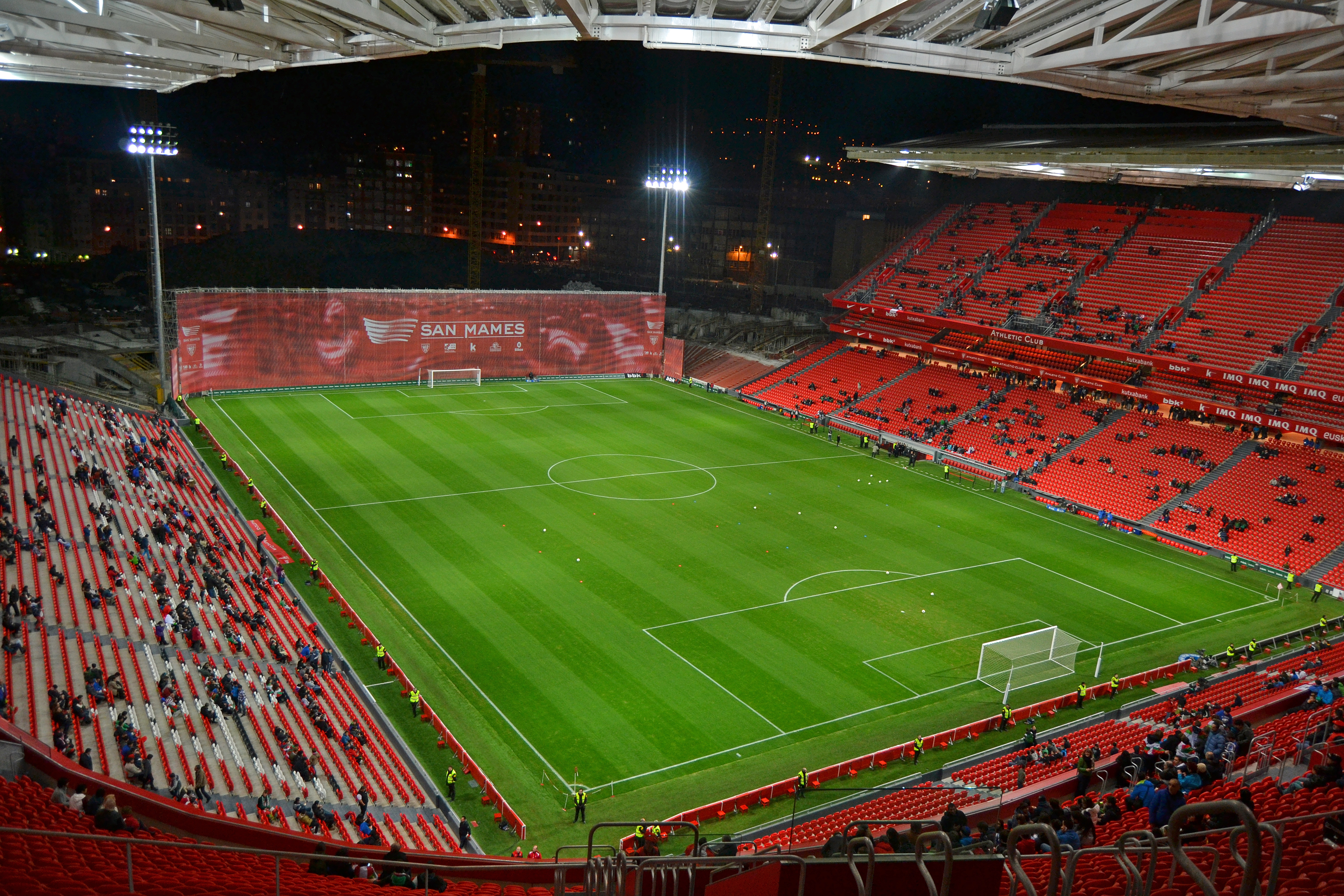
The 'new' San Mamés in a partially completed state in 2013

With the departures of manager Marcelo Bielsa, forward Fernando Llorente and defender Fernando Amorebieta, Athletic looked to replace them in the transfer market. They would begin by replacing Bielsa with former player Ernesto Valverde, who had had a previous spell as manager at the club. They quickly moved to sign Beñat from Real Betis to reinforce the midfield, while also picking up two defenders in Xabier Etxeita and Mikel Balenziaga. Finally, to give the club another, more viable attacking option in tandem with Aritz Aduriz, they signed striker Kike Sola from Osasuna. With these reinforcements, as well as youth breakouts such as Aymeric Laporte and Jonás Ramalho, Athletic looked to have a bounceback-season.

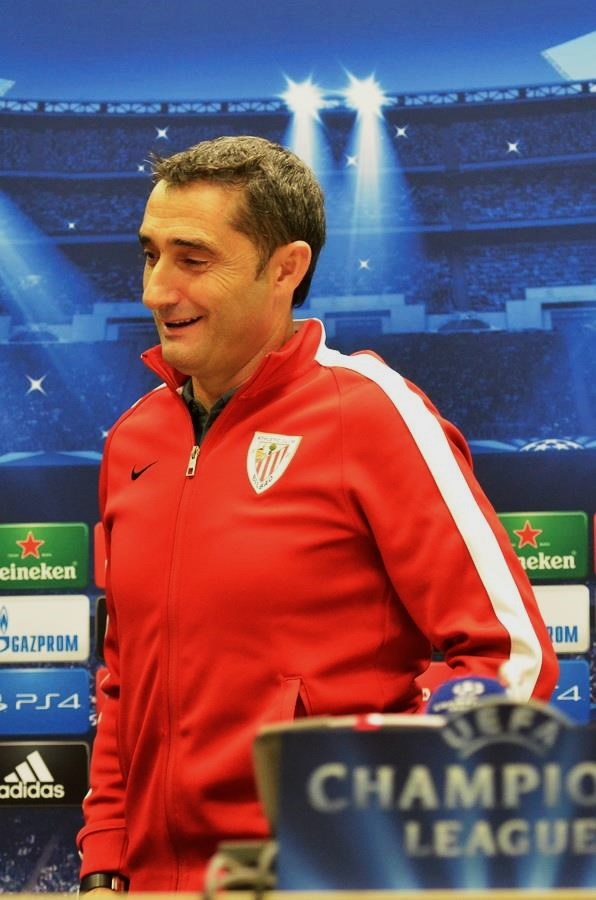
Ernesto Valverde at a Champions League press conference

During the 2013–14 campaign, which included a 1–0 victory over Barcelona, they finished fourth in the league, meaning a new UEFA Champions League campaign. Aritz Aduriz and Ander Herrera proved to play well, with the summer transfer market beginning with a bid for Herrera; a €36 million deal was finalized in June 2014 with Manchester United.

In the first weeks of the 2014–15 season, Athletic had a triumphant first full-capacity match in the new San Mamés as they defeated Napoli to qualify for the Champions League group stage, however they could only finish 3rd behind FC Shakhtar Donetsk and FC Porto and were then knocked out of the Europa League by Torino. Athletic reached the final of the Copa del Rey, but once again lost to Barcelona, 3–1. Captain for the occasion was Andoni Iraola, playing in his final match after over 500 appearances for the club. He was the only Athletic player to start the 2009, 2012 and 2015 cup finals (Susaeta appeared at some point in each of them, as did four men from Barcelona).

In addition to qualifying for the subsequent Europa League through their league position, Athletic qualified for the 2015 Spanish Super Cup as cup finalists. The reserves at Bilbao Athletic won promotion to the Segunda División for the first time in 19 years.

Beginning the 2015–16 season in the first leg of the Super Cup on 14 August 2015 at San Mamés, Athletic historically defeated Barcelona 4–0, with Aritz Aduriz scoring a hat-trick. In the return leg at Camp Nou, Athletic hung on with a 1–1 draw to win their first trophy since 1984. Aduriz continued to score freely throughout the season, finishing with 36 goals in all competitions; this form earned him a place in the Spain squad for Euro 2016 along with clubmate Mikel San José. Other strong performances, notably from youngsters Sabin Merino, Iñigo Lekue and Iñaki Williams and new signing Raúl García contributed to a strong 5th-place finish in the league.

In Europe, Athletic won their group in the Europa League and advanced to the quarter-finals where they were only defeated on penalties by the holders and eventual repeat winners Sevilla FC. Long-serving club captain Carlos Gurpegui retired from playing to become a member of the coaching staff, and Bilbao Athletic were relegated back to the Segunda División B after just one season.

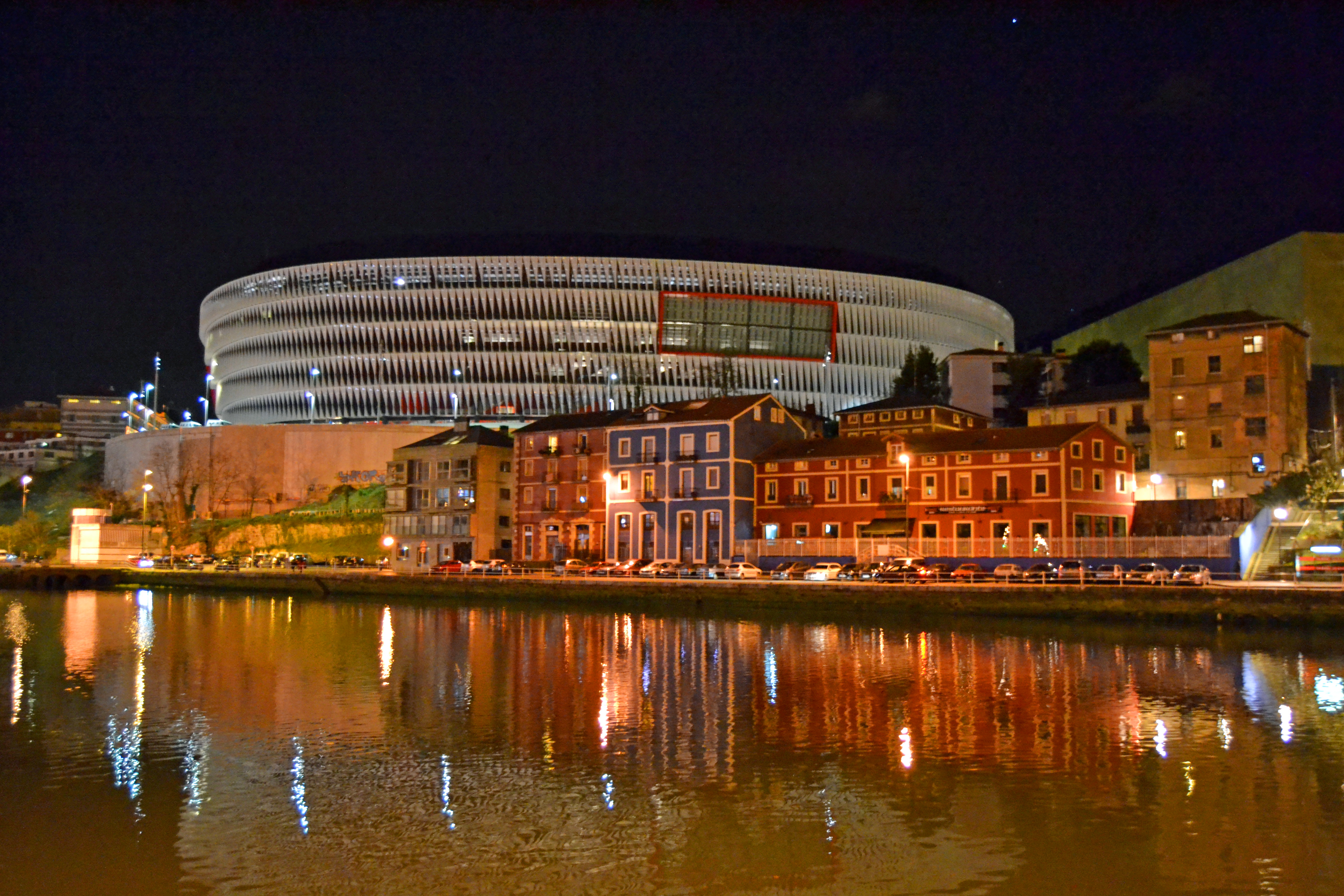
San Mamés exterior at night

The 2016–17 season produced solid results with an almost unchanged squad, although youth graduates Yeray Álvarez and Kepa Arrizabalaga established themselves in the team. A run of four wins in September led to Valverde receiving the La Liga Manager of the Month award for the period. Overall, good home form (43 points) but poor away results (20 points) meant that Champions League qualification was never a realistic possibility. A keen contest for the Europa League places was fought with Villarreal, Real Sociedad and Eibar, until the latter fell out of the running after the meeting at Ipurua was settled by a stoppage-time winner from Raúl García. That victory was one of six in seven games for Athletic in April, however only one point was collected from the final three fixtures in May, while on the last matchday Villarreal got the win they needed for 5th place and Real Sociedad scored a last-minute equaliser in their match, taking the 6th spot by one point. Athletic had to await the outcome of the 2017 Copa del Rey Final to determine if they would compete in continental football the following season - that match was won by Champions League qualifiers Barcelona, and the last Europa League berth therefore passed to Athletic (until a rule change a few years before, it would have gone to cup runners-up Alavés).

In the cups, involvement in the Copa del Rey ended in familiar fashion with elimination by Barcelona (for the sixth time in ten seasons, including three finals). A highlight in the Europa League was Aduriz scoring all Athletic's goals in a 5–3 home win over Genk, a competition record, but despite a 100% home record in the tournament, a loss to APOEL was suffered in the first knockout round due to a weak away performance.

Veteran goalkeeper Gorka Iraizoz, who had still been first choice at the start of the season, was allowed to leave at the end of his contract, having played nearly 400 games in his 10-year-spell. As the season reached its conclusion, on 23 May the club announced that Ernesto Valverde would be leaving his position, bringing to a close his four-year cycle at the helm. The following day it was confirmed that his successor would be former player José Ángel Ziganda, moving up from Bilbao Athletic, on an initial two-year contract. Valverde was subsequently appointed the new manager of Barcelona.

== The Ziganda era ==
Ziganda's spell in charge, controlling a squad which was virtually unchanged from the previous year, began with the third qualifying round for the 2017–18 UEFA Europa League, with Athletic facing FC Dinamo București, a team they had never previously met in European competition. After overcoming the Romanians, Athletic defeated Greece's Panathinaikos to reach the group stage. On 29 November the club suffered a shock defeat to SD Formentera – a club experiencing their first-ever season in the third tier – in the opening round of the domestic cup, conceding the critical goal in stoppage time at the end of the second leg when a goalless draw would have been sufficient to progress.

== Successes, failures, and a new transition (2017-2022) ==
On 29 January 2018, Manchester City deposited the €65 million required by Aymeric Laporte's release clause, allowing the French centre-back to terminate his contract with Athletic Club and join Pep Guardiola's team. Laporte left Athletic after nine years with the club, having made 222 appearances and scored 10 goals. Iñigo Martínez subsequently signed with Athletic until 2023, with a release clause of €80 million.
