= 1950 Copa del Generalísimo final =

Copa del Generalísimo 1950 final
- Event: 1949-50 Copa del Generalísimo
Atlético Bilbao	Valladolid
4	1
- Date: 28 May 1950
- Venue: Estadio Chamartín, Madrid
- Referee: Ramón Azón
- Attendance: 80,000

The Copa del Generalísimo 1950 final was the 48th final of the King's Cup. The final was played at Estadio Chamartín in Madrid, on 28 May 1950, being won by Atlético de Bilbao, who beat Real Valladolid 4–1 after extra time.

== Match details ==
28 May 1950
17:30 CET

Atlético Bilbao	4–1 (a.e.t.)	Valladolid
Zarra 15', 94', 96', 117'	Report	Coque 85'

Estadio Chamartín, Madrid
Attendance: 80,000
Referee: Ramón Azón

Atlético Bilbao

Valladolid

Atlético de Bilbao:
GK	1	(Spain) Raimundo Lezama
DF	2	(Spain) Canito
DF	3	(Spain) Serafín Areta
DF	4	(Spain) Anselmo Aramberri
MF	5	(Spain) Manolín
MF	6	(Spain) Nando
FW	7	(Spain) Rafael Iriondo
FW	8	(Spain) Venancio
FW	9	(Spain) Telmo Zarra
FW	10	(Spain) José Luis Panizo (c)
FW	11	(Spain) Agustín Gaínza
Manager:
(Spain) José Iraragorri

Real Valladolid:
GK	1	(Spain) José Luis Saso
DF	2	(Spain) Francisco Lesmes
DF	3	(Spain) Joan Babot
DF	4	(Spain) Rafael Lesmes
MF	5	(Spain) Juan Antonio Ortega
MF	6	(Spain) Isidro Lasala
FW	7	(Spain) Apolinar Revuelta
FW	8	(Spain) Gerardo Coque
FW	9	(Spain) Julián Vaquero (c)
FW	10	(Spain) Emilio Aldecoa
FW	11	(Spain) Francisco Juanco
Manager:
(Spain) Antonio Barrios
