= 1953 Copa del Generalísimo final =

Copa del Generalísimo 1953 final
- Event: 1952-53 Copa del Generalísimo
Barcelona	Atlético Bilbao
2	1
- Date: 21 June 1953
- Venue: Estadio Chamartín, Madrid
- Referee: Rafael García Fernández
- Attendance: 67,145

The Copa del Generalísimo 1953 final was the 51st final of the King's Cup. The final was played at Estadio Chamartín in Madrid, on 21 June 1953, being won by CF Barcelona, who beat Atlético de Bilbao 2–1.

== Details ==
21 June 1953
18:00 CET

Barcelona	2–1	Atlético Bilbao
Kubala 46'; Manchón 57'	Report (in Spanish)	Venancio 61'

Estadio Chamartín, Madrid
Attendance: 67,145
Referee: Rafael García Fernández

Barcelona

Athletic Bilbao

GK	1	(Spain) Antoni Ramallets
DF	2	(Spain) Josep Seguer
DF	3	(Spain) Gustau Biosca
DF	4	(Spain) Juan Segarra
MF	5	(Spain) Isidre Flotats
MF	6	(Spain) Mariano Gonzalvo (c)
FW	7	(Spain) Estanislau Basora
FW	8	(Spain) Andreu Bosch
FW	9	(Hungary) László Kubala
FW	10	(Spain) Moreno
FW	11	(Spain) Eduardo Manchón
Manager:
(Czechoslovakia) Ferdinand Daučík

GK	1	(Spain) Carmelo Cedrún
DF	2	(Spain) José María Orúe
DF	3	(Spain) Serafín Areta
DF	4	(Spain) Jesús Garay
MF	5	(Spain) Manolín
MF	6	(Spain) Canito
FW	7	(Spain) Rafael Iriondo
FW	8	(Spain) Venancio
FW	9	(Spain) Telmo Zarra
FW	10	(Spain) José Luis Panizo (c)
FW	11	(Spain) Agustín Gaínza
Manager:
(Spain) Antonio Barrios

== See also ==
- Athletic–Barcelona clásico
