= 1945 Copa del Generalísimo final =

Copa del Generalísimo 1945 final
- Event: 1944-45 Copa del Generalísimo
Athletic Bilbao	Valencia
3	2
- Date: 24 June 1945
- Venue: Montjuïc, Barcelona
- Referee: Pedro Escartín
- Attendance: 55,000

The Copa del Generalísimo 1945 final was the 43rd final of the King's Cup. The final was played at Montjuïc in Barcelona, on 24 June 1945, being won by Club Atlético de Bilbao, who beat Valencia CF 3-2.

== Match details ==
24 June 1945
18:30 CET

Athletic Bilbao	3–2	Valencia
Zarra 21'; Iriondo 26', 90'	Report (in Spanish)	Amadeo 12'; Mundo 37'

Montjuïc, Barcelona
Attendance: 55,000
Referee: Pedro Escartín

Athletic Bilbao
Valencia

GK	1	(Spain) Raimundo Lezama
DF	2	(Spain) José Luis Bergaretxe
DF	3	(Spain) Juan José Mieza
MF	4	(Spain) Francisco Celaya
MF	5	(Spain) Roberto Bertol (c)
MF	6	(Spain) Nando
FW	7	(Spain) Rafael Iriondo
FW	8	(Spain) José Luis Panizo
FW	9	(Spain) Telmo Zarra	(red card) 86'
FW	10	(Spain) Francisco Gárate
FW	11	(Spain) Agustín Gaínza
Manager:
(Spain) Juan Urquizu

GK	1	(Spain) Ignacio Eizaguirre
DF	2	(Spain) Álvaro	(red card) 86'
DF	3	(Spain) Juan Ramón (c)
MF	4	(Spain) Vicente Asensi
MF	5	(Spain) Carlos Iturraspe
MF	6	(Spain) Simón Lecue
FW	7	(Spain) Inocencio Bertolí
FW	8	(Spain) Amadeo
FW	9	(Spain) Mundo
FW	10	(Spain) Silvestre Igoa
FW	11	(Spain) Guillermo Gorostiza
Manager:
(Spain) Eduardo Cubells
