= Roberto Bertol =

Spanish footballer (1917–1990)

Personal information
- Full name: Robert Bertol Garrastazu
- Date of birth: 2 December 1917
- Place of birth: Lizarza (Guipúzcoa), Spain
- Date of death: 3 March 1990 (aged 72)
- Place of death: Bilbao, Spain
- Position: Midfielder

Senior career*
Years	Team	Apps	(Gls)
1939–1950	Athletic Bilbao	187	(0)

International career
1947–1948	Spain	2	(0)
- * Club domestic league appearances and goals

Roberto Bertol Garrastazu (2 December 1917 – 3 March 1990) was a Spanish footballer. He was a key part of the great Athletic Bilbao team of the 1940s, where he spent 11 seasons and would eventually become its captain.

== Career ==
Bertol was born in Lizarza, a small town in Gipuzkoa near the border with Navarre. His first steps as a player were with a modest hometown team. At the outbreak of the Spanish Civil War (1936) had just 18 years old. Like many boys his age Bertol, was forced to fight in the war. When it ended in 1939 he played for SD Deusto (Bilbao), a team that won a national amateur championship that year.

After the civil war, Athletic Bilbao was forced to rebuild their team almost from scratch, because most players who had proclaimed league champions in 1936 were now retired or in exile. This started a campaign in which they sought new players from the second division teams based in Biscay. Bertol was one of the players selected in that talent search campaign, one of the first in the new Athletic. His debut in the Spanish Primera División took place on 3 December 1939 when he had just turned 22.

His professional football career lasted the next 10 years in the ranks of Athletic Bilbao, between the 1939–40 season and 1949–50. During those years he was a member of one of the best teams in the history of Athletic, the team known as the 'historic second front' consisting of Iriondo, Zarra, Venancio, Panizo and Gaínza. Bertol was one of the key pieces in that team, especially between 1942–43 and 1948–49 seasons, although his role was in second place to the stars of the club, namely the forwards and the goalkeeper Lezama. His role was to provide security to the midfield. At the end of his career also served as team captain because of his charisma and seniority.

Bertol's honours included a league title (1942–43), two runner-up finishes (1940–41 and 1946–47), two Cup wins (1944, 1945) and two losing finals (1942 and 1949).

After defending the jersey for 186 matches and 11 seasons, Bertol played his last official match in the league on 9 October 1949. That season he rounded out his resume with the last Cup title, but did not play an active role.

A farewell match for him was played on 21 December 1950 in San Mames Stadium.

=== National team ===
Bertol was called to play with the Spain national football team twice. His international debut was on 26 January 1947 in a friendly against Portugal (4–1 defeat), and his second and final match was played in 1948 against Switzerland, a 3–3 draw.
