= Isaac Oceja =

Spanish footballer and coach

- Oceja in 1943

Personal information
- Full name: Isaac Oceja Oceja
- Date of birth: 29 May 1915
- Place of birth: Escalante, Spain
- Date of death: 27 September 2000 (aged 85)
- Place of death: Barakaldo, Spain
- Position: Defender

Senior career*
Years	Team	Apps	(Gls)
1933–1948	Athletic Bilbao	186	(1)
1948–1949	Zaragoza	?	(?)

International career
1941–1942	Spain	4	(0)

Managerial career
- 1948–1949: Alavés
- 1949: Zaragoza
- 1954–1960: Cultural Durango
- 1961–1965: Cultural Durango
- * Club domestic league appearances and goals

Isaac Oceja Oceja (1915-2000) was a Spanish football player and coach. He is most known for the 15 years he spent at Athletic Bilbao.

== Playing career ==
=== Club ===
Born in Cantabria but raised from a young age in Biscay, Oceja's early amateur teams included hometown club Cultural Durango, SD Lemona and CD Basconia. Although naturally right-footed, he learned to play equally well using his left foot and played on that side of the defence upon turning professional with Athletic Bilbao. His début in La Liga was on 6 January 1935, in a game against Real Madrid where Athletic won 4–1. When the Spanish Civil War interrupted the normal football processes, Oceja spent time playing for Barakaldo CF. Returning to Bilbao following the conflict, the club was faced with rebuilding a squad using several young players, and refused to sanction the transfer of the more experienced Oceja to FC Barcelona, an offer which would have greatly increased his salary.

He was noted for his elegance on the field and disciplined manner off it. In his career with Athletic he played a total of 239 games (186 in the league), winning a league title in 1935–36 and two consecutive Copas de Generalísimo in 1943 and 1944, the latter as captain. He took no part in the 1942–43 La Liga season where his team finished as champions, having been seriously injured (a ruptured medial meniscus) playing for Spain against France in March 1942, although he recovered to participate in the victorious 1943 Cup campaign, and a double lower leg fracture caused him to miss out on a likely third Cup final appearance in 1945. Due to his injury lay-offs, Athletic tied him to a 'pay as you play' contract, and Oceja admitted that due to his dissatisfaction with the situation he refused to play in a crucial league clash against Valencia CF in 1947 (having been involved in every other match that season); in his absence, Los Ché won the match and went on to secure the title over Athletic on head-to-head results after finishing level on points.

=== International ===
He received four call-ups for the Spain national team. He made his debut at 12 January 1941 at his 'home' stadium San Mamés in a friendly match against Portugal (2–2), in which his defensive colleague at Athletic Bilbao, Juan José Mieza, also appeared for the first time.

== Coaching ==
Oceja retired from playing in 1949 after a short stint at Real Zaragoza. The next season, he assumed the role of coach for the Aragonese team, then languishing in the Tercera División, and helped them to achieve promotion. His stint at La Rosaleda did not last long after that achievement, and despite having secured the relevant coaching qualifications, his only later forays into management were two spells with Durango in the lower leagues during the 1950s and 60s.

== Honours ==
Athletic Bilbao

- La Liga: 1935–36; runner-up: 1940–41, 1946–47
- Copa del Rey: 1943, 1944
- Basque Cup: 1934–35
- Biscay Championship: 1939–40
