= Raimundo Lezama =

Spanish footballer (1922–2007)

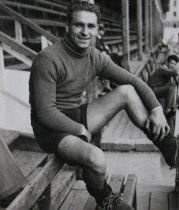

Personal information
- Full name: Raimundo Pérez Lezama
- Date of birth: 29 November 1922
- Place of birth: Barakaldo, Spain
- Date of death: 23 July 2007 (aged 84)
- Place of death: Laguardia, Spain
- Height: 1.78 m (5 ft 10 in)
- Position: Goalkeeper

Youth career
- Southampton

Senior career*
Years	Team	Apps	(Gls)
1939–1940	Southampton	0	(0)
1940–1941	Arenas Getxo		
1941–1957	Athletic Bilbao	197	(0)
1955	→ Barakaldo (loan)	5	(0)
1957–1958	Indautxu	1	(0)
1958–1960	Sestao	34	(0)
1960–1961	Arenas Getxo		
Total		237	(0)

International career
1947	Spain	1	(0)
- * Club domestic league appearances and goals

Raimundo Pérez Lezama (29 November 1922 – 23 July 2007) was a Spanish footballer who played as a goalkeeper.

After beginning his professional career in England, he returned to his country, going on to later represent, mainly, Athletic Bilbao.

== Club career ==
=== Refugee in England ===
Lezama was born in Barakaldo, Biscay but moved to England as a refugee at the age of 14. He entered at the port of Southampton on board the Habana on 23 May 1937, he and his brother Luis being among 3,889 Basque children fleeing the Spanish Civil War; some of the other refugees also became footballers, including Emilio Aldecoa, Sabino Barinaga and José Gallego.

While in Southampton, Lezama played for his school Nazareth House (less than half a mile from The Dell), where he was spotted by Southampton and signed for the club as a trainee, eventually progressing to the reserves before making his first-team debut on 1 June 1940 in a 0–5 away defeat against Arsenal. His next game was at Craven Cottage, when the "Saints" fielded five Arsenal players (Ernie Collett, Leslie Compton, Eddie Hapgood, Leslie Jones and Bernard Joy) in a 2–1 victory over Fulham, with both goals for the victors being scored by local boy Eric Webber despite the plethora of stars.

Lezama played one further match, a 1–3 defeat at Charlton Athletic at the end of an extended wartime season. Despite being underage, he briefly worked as a driver for the Royal Air Force.

=== Athletic Bilbao ===
On returning to Spain in 1940, Lezama joined Arenas Club de Getxo in Segunda División. In 1941 he signed for Athletic Bilbao, and made his La Liga debut on 27 September 1942 in a 5–0 home win over Real Betis. The 1942–43 season saw the side, with a team that also included Telmo Zarra, José Luis Panizo and Agustín Gaínza, win a double (league and Copa del Rey); he helped Athletic retain the cup in both 1944 and 1945, winning it again in 1950.

While at Bilbao, Lezama also won the Ricardo Zamora Trophy as best goalkeeper during 1946–47. He added his only cap for Spain on 26 January 1947, when he was a second-half substitute for José Bañón in a 1–4 away defeat against Portugal.

Throughout the rest of his career at Athletic, Lezama was only a squad player, making only 12 league appearances in his last five campaigns combined. After playing 197 league matches (261 in all competitions), he left the club in 1957.

=== Later career ===
In 1957, Lezama joined SD Indautxu in the second level, where his teammates included emerging youngsters Chus Pereda and Miguel Jones. He spent two further seasons in that tier with Sestao Sport Club, before rejoining first team in Spain Arenas de Getxo in 1960.

Lezama died of heart failure in Laguardia, Álava, at the age of 84. It was sometimes thought that Athletic's training facilities were named after him, but in fact these were named for their location, the village of Lezama near Bilbao.

== Honours ==
=== Club ===
Athletic Bilbao

- La Liga: 1942–43
- Copa del Generalísimo: 1943, 1944, 1945, 1950
- Copa Eva Duarte: 1950

=== Individual ===
- Ricardo Zamora Trophy: 1946–47
