= Venancio Pérez =

Spanish footballer

Venancio
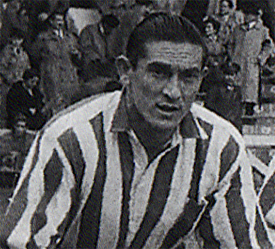
- Venancio with Athletic Bilbao in 1953

Personal information
- Full name: Venancio Pérez García
- Date of birth: 22 April 1921
- Place of birth: Sestao, Spain
- Date of death: 28 November 1994 (aged 73)
- Place of death: San Sebastián, Spain
- Height: 1.81 m (5 ft 11 in)
- Position: Forward

Senior career*
| Years | Team | Apps | (Gls) |
| 1943–1945 | Erandio | | |
| 1945–1955 | Athletic Bilbao | 167 | (68) |
| 1947–1949 | → Barakaldo (loan) | 43 | (29) |
| 1955–1956 | Barakaldo | 12 | (8) |
| Total | | 222 | (105) |

International career
| 1949–1954 | Spain | 11 | (4) |
- * Club domestic league appearances and goals

Venancio Pérez García (22 April 1921 – 28 November 1994), known simply as Venancio, was a Spanish footballer who played mainly as a forward.

== Early life ==
From a poor family in Sestao, Biscay, Venancio started working at a young age in the Altos Hornos de Vizcaya factory. Tall and powerfully built, he played pelota mano (an offshoot of Basque pelota) in his youth, and only became a full-time professional footballer at the age of 24.

== Club career ==
Venancio started playing the sport as a hobby, whilst he was performing his military service in Vitoria-Gasteiz. After starting out at SD Erandio Club he signed with Athletic Bilbao in early 1945 for 25.000 pesetas, but featured sparingly in his first seasons, being loaned to Barakaldo CF from Segunda División.

In February 1949, Venancio was recalled. In the first game upon his return, he scored twice in a 3–0 home win against CD Alcoyano. He finished the campaign with a further five in only six appearances, and went on to be part of one of the most legendary attacking lines in the club's history alongside Agustín Gaínza, Rafael Iriondo, José Luis Panizo and Telmo Zarra, winning four titles which included three Copa del Generalísimo.

Venancio left the San Mamés Stadium in 1955, aged 34, retiring after a spell in the second tier with former team Barakaldo. With his main club, he amassed competitive totals of 208 matches and 91 goals over one decade, and was often deployed as a central defender in his last years.

== International career ==
Venancio earned 11 caps for Spain in five years. His debut came on 12 June 1949, in a 4–1 friendly win over the Republic of Ireland in Dublin.

On 6 January 1954, Venancio scored the last of his four goals for the country to help to a 4–1 defeat of Turkey for the 1954 FIFA World Cup qualifiers, but the opposition would eventually reach the finals in Switzerland after a drawing of lots.

== Post-retirement and death ==
After retiring, Venancio settled in Bilbao and opened a metal shop. Married with two sons, he died in San Sebastián on 28 November 1994, at 73.

== Honours ==
Athletic Bilbao

- Copa del Generalísimo: 1944–45, 1949–50, 1955
- Copa Eva Duarte: 1950
