= Luis Márquez =

Luis Márquez may refer to:

- Luis Márquez (footballer, born 1876) (1876–1930), Spanish football executive and former player
- Luis Márquez (baseball) (1925–1988), Puerto Rican baseball player
- Luis Márquez (footballer, born 1995), Mexican football attacking midfielder
