= Miguel de Andrés =

Spanish footballer

Personal information
- Full name: Miguel de Andrés Barace
- Date of birth: 8 October 1957 (age 69)
- Place of birth: Ochagavía, Spain
- Height: 1.78 m (5 ft 10 in)
- Position: Midfielder

Youth career
- Berbinzana
- 1974–1975: Pamplona
- 1975–1976: Athletic Bilbao

Senior career*
Years	Team	Apps	(Gls)
1976–1979	Bilbao Athletic	59	(3)
1978–1979	→ Castellón (loan)	29	(1)
1979–1988	Athletic Bilbao	200	(9)
Total		288	(13)

International career
1975	Spain U18	4	(0)
1980	Spain U23	1	(0)
1979–1983	Spain amateur	7	(0)
1980–1981	Spain B	3	(0)
1984	Spain	2	(0)
- * Club domestic league appearances and goals

Miguel de Andrés Barace (born 8 October 1957) is a Spanish former professional footballer who played as a midfielder.

== Club career ==
Born in Ochagavía – Otsagabia, Navarre, de Andrés joined Athletic Bilbao's youth system, Lezama, in 1975, after reported interest from both Real Madrid and FC Barcelona. The Basques paid his previous club 400.000 pesetas, having to spend an additional 5 million if the player made his debut with the first team.

De Andrés returned to his alma mater after two years with the reserves in the lower leagues and one season on loan to CD Castellón in the Segunda División, with the 21-year-old being awarded a chance in the main squad by Helmut Senekowitsch, formerly in charge of the Austria national side. He made his La Liga debut on 9 September 1979, in a 2–1 away defeat against UD Salamanca.

Early into the 1980–81 campaign, the Austrian manager was fired after a 7–1 loss at Real Madrid, but de Andrés kept his place in the starting XI. He would eventually start in every league match he appeared for Athletic, although he rarely played in his preferred position, sweeper, being mostly deployed as a defensive midfielder; under Javier Clemente, he contributed 55 games and four goals as the team won back-to-back domestic leagues.

On 9 February 1983, as Bilbao went on to win the first of its two leagues, de Andrés, who possessed a powerful shot with both legs, scored twice from long range in a 5–2 home win over RCD Español during a heavy snowfall at the San Mamés Stadium. The following year, he started in the Copa del Rey final as his team completed the double after the 1–0 win against Barcelona in Madrid, but was also one of six players suspended – the punishment was later lifted – after the battleground that followed the final whistle, the others being Paco Clos, Diego Maradona, Migueli, Andoni Goikoetxea and Manuel Sarabia.

1986–87, in which legendary player José Ángel Iribar replaced Clemente as head coach, was disastrous for de Andrés: he suffered an injury against Sporting de Gijón in the first matchday, going on to experience several relapses, and was suspended by the club after refusing to appear in a cup match against CD Logroñés; reappearing against Real Madrid in the 31st round, as Bilbao struggled to avoid falling into the relegation group (the competition was, for the first and only time, divided into three groups after the regular season), his knee was shattered after opponent Ricardo Gallego fell on it, and he never appeared for the Lions again.

Howard Kendall was appointed Athletic Bilbao's manager in 1987, but de Andrés retired from football after one year in the sidelines aged 31, with 267 official appearances for Athletic (12 goals). Subsequently, he worked for them as a scout.

== International career ==
De Andrés represented Spain at the 1980 Summer Olympics in Moscow, playing all the matches and minutes in an eventual group-stage exit (three draws). Manager José Santamaría used him in the defensive sector alongside Agustín Gajate of Real Sociedad.

Even though he made the list of 40 for the 1982 FIFA World Cup on home soil, with Santamaría again as coach, de Andrés did not make the final cut. After Miguel Muñoz was appointed and Spain qualified for UEFA Euro 1984, he made his full debut on 18 January 1984 in a 0–1 friendly loss with Hungary in Cádiz; three months later, he appeared ten minutes in the match with Denmark (2–1 in Valencia), but was overlooked for the final squad which eventually finished second in France.

== Honours ==
Athletic Bilbao

- La Liga: 1982–83, 1983–84
- Copa del Rey: 1983–84
- Supercopa de España: 1984 (Athletic Bilbao were awarded the trophy as winners of the double)
