= José Ángel Iribar =

Spanish footballer and manager

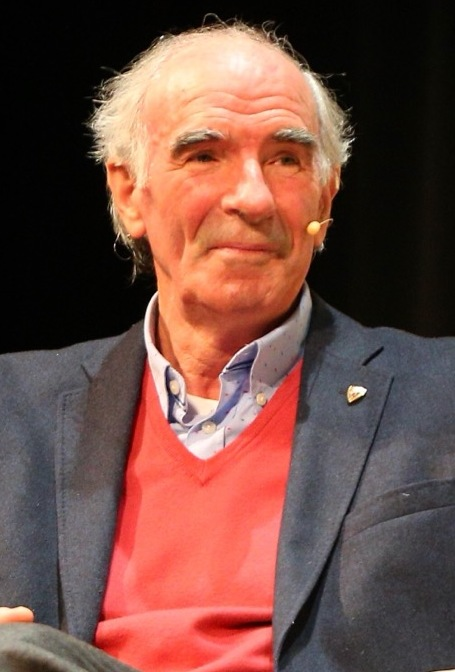
- Iribar in 2019

Personal information
- Full name: José Ángel Iribar Kortajarena
- Date of birth: 1 March 1943 (age 83)
- Place of birth: Zarautz, Spain
- Height: 1.82 m (6 ft 0 in)
- Position: Goalkeeper

Youth career
- Salleco
- Zarautz

Senior career*
Years	Team	Apps	(Gls)
1961–1962	Basconia	24	(0)
1962–1980	Athletic Bilbao	466	(0)
Total		490	(0)

International career
1964–1976	Spain	49	(0)
1979	Basque Country	1	(0)

Managerial career
- 1983–1986: Bilbao Athletic
- 1986–1987: Athletic Bilbao
- 1987: Bilbao Athletic
- 1988: Basque Country
- 1993–2010: Basque Country
Medal record
Representing Spain
European Nations' Cup
Winner	1964 Spain
- * Club domestic league appearances and goals

José Ángel Iribar Kortajarena (born 1 March 1943), nicknamed El Chopo ("the Poplar"), is a Spanish former professional football goalkeeper and manager.

Having played almost exclusively for Athletic Bilbao, he appeared in more than 600 official games for the club over the course of 18 La Liga seasons, winning two Copa del Generalísimo trophies.

Iribar represented the Spain national team in the 1964 Nations' Cup and the 1966 World Cup, winning the former tournament.

== Club career ==
Iribar was born in Zarautz, Gipuzkoa. After only three La Liga games in his first professional season at Athletic Bilbao, he proceeded to become the Basques' undisputed starter for the following 16 seasons; his senior debut was made at Basconia in 1961, when the latter was still not the farm team: they eliminated Atlético Madrid in the Copa del Generalísimo, and his stellar performance prompted his signing for a then-record one million pesetas; in that competition, they later lost 10–1 at Barcelona with him also in goal.

At Athletic, Iribar profited from injury to Carmelo Cedrún in October 1963 and never looked back, winning two Spanish Cups and reaching the final of the 1976–77 UEFA Cup, lost to Juventus. In the 1969–70 campaign he was awarded the Ricardo Zamora Trophy, conceding just 20 goals while taking part in all 30 fixtures for the runners-up.

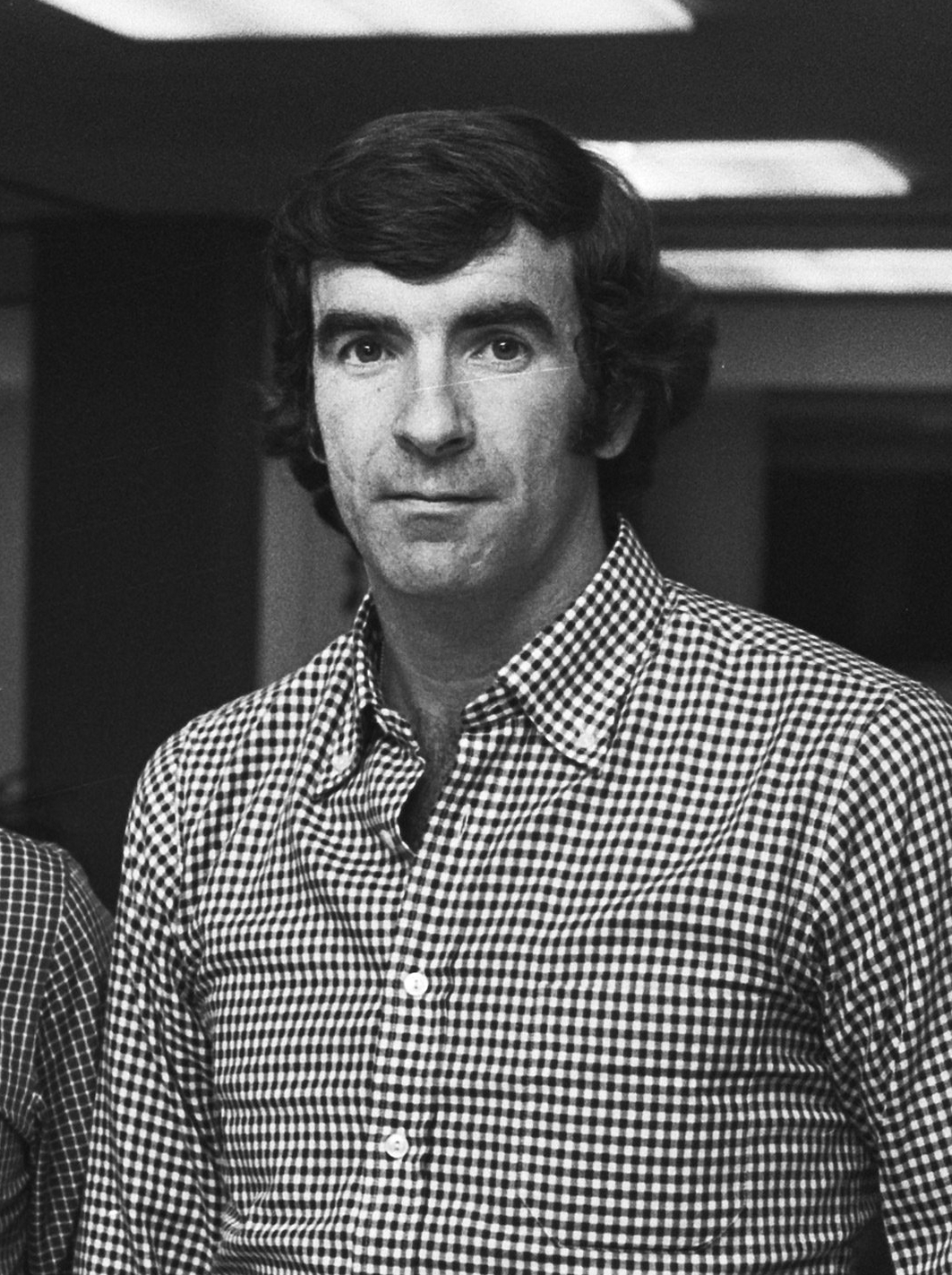
Iribar in 1978

Iribar was awarded a benefit match in 1971, a 1–1 draw against West Bromwich Albion (the former club of Athletic's manager at the time, Ronnie Allen), having already played the same opponents a few weeks earlier in England for Bobby Hope's testimonial. He retired nine years later at 37, having made 614 appearances in all competitions – a club record by some margin – as another player in the position, Andoni Zubizarreta, would arrive in the summer; he also held its record in European competition until 2016, when his total of 55 was passed by Markel Susaeta.

Subsequently, Iribar joined Athletic's coaching staff, taking charge of the goalkeepers. In 1983–84 he managed the reserve side Bilbao Athletic, leading them to the second place in the Segunda División, a best-ever, although they were not eligible for promotion.

Statue of Iribar at San Mamés Stadium, installed in 2023

Iribar also coached the main squad in the 1986–87 season; for the only time, the league had a second stage divided in three groups, and Athletic 'won' the relegation section to finish 13th. From 1988 and for over two decades, he was in charge of the Basque Country representative team.

A statue of Iribar was installed in on the concourse outside the San Mamés Stadium in December 2023.

== International career ==
Iribar made his debut for Spain on 11 March 1964, in the first leg of the 1964 European Nations' Cup's last qualifying stage, a 5–1 home win against the Republic of Ireland (7–1 aggregate). He was the starter during the finals, and the nation claimed the tournament on home soil.

Iribar also represented Spain at the 1966 FIFA World Cup, playing all three group-stage matches. He retained his position for a further ten years; on 20 November 1974, in a UEFA Euro 1976 qualifier away to Scotland, he equalled the record of 46 caps held by fellow goalkeeper Ricardo Zamora, and overtook him the following 5 February at home to the same opponents. His 49th and final game was on 24 April 1976 in a 1–1 draw against West Germany in the quarter-finals of the same competition; he missed the second leg, officially due to a finger injury, which he denied decades later amidst theories that he was dropped for his political views.

Another goalkeeper, Luis Arconada, broke Iribar's mark in 1983.

== Style of play ==
Spanish 2010 World Cup winning goalkeeper Iker Casillas included Iribar in his list of the ten greatest goalkeepers of all time, and described him as "one of the greatest keepers Spain has ever produced. He was a big presence in goal and had that ability to intimidate opponents. But it wasn't all about his size, which is useless on its own. He combined his physicality with terrific positioning." In Italy, the former was given the nickname "Zoff's twin" due to his goalkeeping ability, leadership and physical resemblance to Italian counterpart Dino Zoff.

== Political views ==
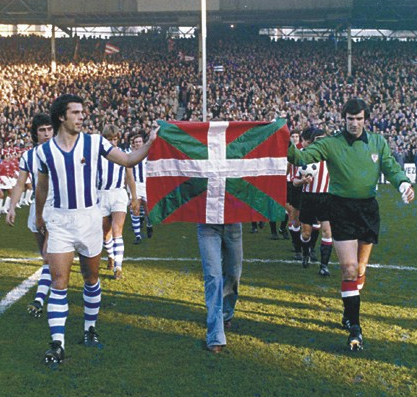
Inaxio Kortabarria and Iribar carrying the Ikurriña (1976)

On 5 December 1976, before a game against Real Sociedad, Iribar and the opposing captain, Inaxio Kortabarria, carried out the Ikurriña, the Basque flag, and placed it ceremonially on the centre-circle. This was the first public display of the flag since the death of Francisco Franco, but it was still illegal.

He subsequently became involved in Basque local politics, and was a founding member of the separatist coalition Herri Batasuna.

== Career statistics ==
Appearances and goals by national team and year
National team	Year	Apps	Goals
Spain	1964	5	0
Spain	1965	2	0
Spain	1966	6	0
Spain	1967	5	0
Spain	1968	5	0
Spain	1969	1	0
Spain	1970	5	0
Spain	1971	3	0
Spain	1972	6	0
Spain	1973	3	0
Spain	1974	5	0
Spain	1975	2	0
Spain	1976	1	0
Total		49	0

== Honours ==
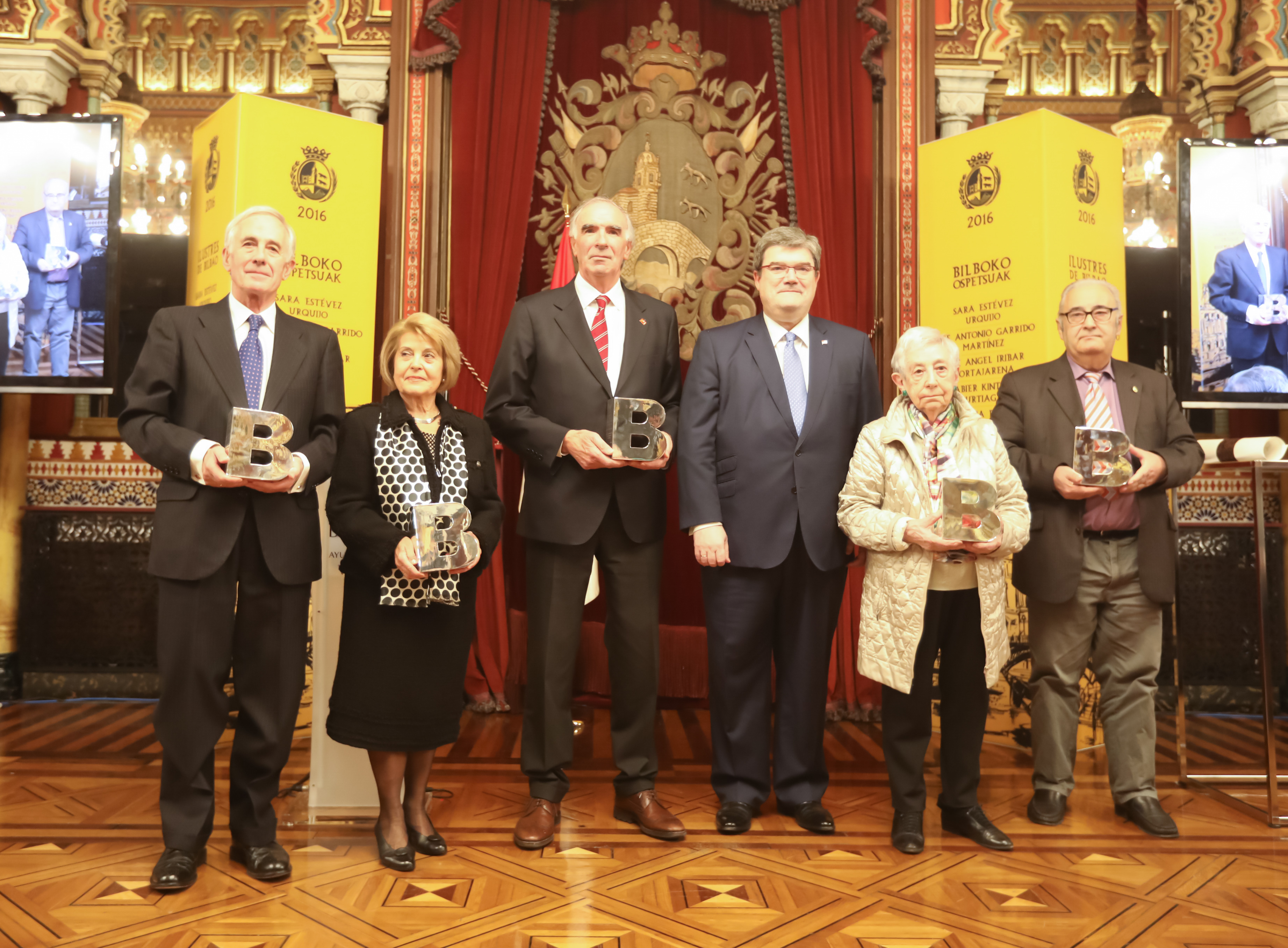
Iribar (third from left) accepting an award at Bilbao City Hall in 2016

Athletic Bilbao

- Copa del Generalísimo: 1969, 1972–73; runner-up 1965–66, 1966–67, 1976–77
- UEFA Cup runner-up: 1976–77

Spain

- UEFA European Championship: 1964

Individual

- Ricardo Zamora Trophy: 1969–70
- La Liga Team of The Year: 1975–76

== See also ==
- List of Athletic Bilbao players (+200 appearances)
- List of La Liga players (400+ appearances)
