= Manolín (footballer, born 1928) =

Spanish footballer

Personal information
- Full name: Manuel Martínez Canales
- Date of birth: 21 May 1928
- Place of birth: Getxo, Spain
- Date of death: 25 July 2014 (aged 86)
- Place of death: Zaragoza, Spain
- Position: Midfielder

Youth career
- 1944–1947: Puerto

Senior career*
Years	Team	Apps	(Gls)
1947–1948	Guecho	11	(0)
1948–1949	Racing de Ferrol	20	(2)
1949–1955	Athletic Bilbao	160	(7)
1955–1956	Real Madrid	9	(1)
1956–1959	Zaragoza	41	(0)
1959–1960	Recreativo	8	(0)
1960	Indauchu	0	(0)

International career
1953	Spain	1	(0)

Managerial career
- 1964: Alavés
- 1964–1965: Badalona
- 1967–1969: Arenas Club
- 1969–1970: Villosa
- 1971–1972: Palencia
- 1972–1973: Orense
- 1973: Mallorca
- 1974: Orense
- 1975–1976: Guecho
- 1976–1977: Cultural Leonesa
- 1977–1978: Lugo
- 1978: Baracaldo
- 1979: Guecho
- 1980–1981: Lugo
- 1981–1983: Orense
- 1983–1984: Lugo
- * Club domestic league appearances and goals

Manuel Martínez Canales (21 May 1928 – 25 July 2014), known as Manolín was a Spanish professional footballer who played as a midfielder.

== Career ==
Born in Getxo, Manolín played for first division sides Athletic Bilbao, Real Madrid and Real Zaragoza. He retired in 1960 after short spells with Segunda División sides Recreativo de Huelva and SD Indautxu.

Manolín earned one cap for the Spanish national side, playing against Argentina in Buenos Aires on 5 July 1953.

== Death ==
He died on 25 July 2014 at the age of 86.

== Honours ==
Athletic Club

- Copa del Rey: 1949–50, 1955
- Copa Eva Duarte: 1950

Real Madrid

- European Cup: 1955-56
