= Nando González =

Spanish footballer (1921–1988)

Nando
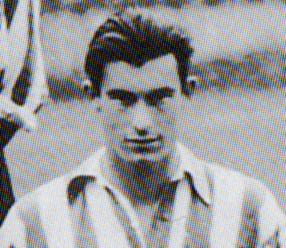
- Nando with Athletic Bilbao in 1945

Personal information
- Full name: Fernando González Valenciaga
- Date of birth: 1 February 1921
- Place of birth: Getxo, Spain
- Date of death: 3 January 1988 (aged 66)
- Place of death: Bilbao, Spain
- Position: Midfielder

Senior career*
Years	Team	Apps	(Gls)
1940–1941	Indauchu		
1941–1952	Athletic Bilbao	214	(6)
1952–1954	Racing Santander	38	(0)

International career
1947–1951	Spain	8	(0)

Managerial career
- 1952: Racing Santander
- 1955–1956: Racing Santander
- 1960–1961: Orense
- 1961–1962: Atlético Ceuta
- * Club domestic league appearances and goals

Fernando González Valenciaga (1 February 1921 – 3 January 1988), better known as Nando, was a Spanish football player and manager. A midfielder, he spent most of his career with Athletic Bilbao and took part in the 1950 FIFA World Cup with the Spain national team.
