= Rafael Iriondo =

Spanish footballer and manager

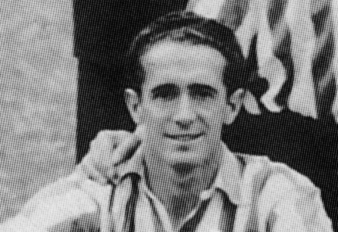
- Iriondo with Athletic Bilbao in 1945

Personal information
- Full name: Rafael Iriondo Aurtenetxea
- Date of birth: 24 October 1918
- Place of birth: Guernica, Spain
- Date of death: 24 February 2016 (aged 97)
- Place of death: Bilbao, Spain
- Height: 1.71 m (5 ft 7 in)
- Position: Forward

Youth career
- Gernika

Senior career*
Years	Team	Apps	(Gls)
1939–1940	Atlético Tetuán		
1940–1953	Athletic Bilbao	257	(80)
1953	Barakaldo	3	(1)
1953–1955	Real Sociedad	28	(9)
1955	Indautxu	1	(0)
Total		289	(90)

International career
1946–1947	Spain	2	(1)

Managerial career
- 1955–1956: Indautxu
- 1958–1959: Alavés
- 1961–1962: Barakaldo
- 1965–1968: Bilbao Athletic
- 1968–1969: Athletic Bilbao
- 1970: Español
- 1971–1972: Zaragoza
- 1972–1974: Real Sociedad
- 1974–1976: Athletic Bilbao
- 1976–1978: Betis
- 1980: Rayo Vallecano
- 1981–1982: Betis
- * Club domestic league appearances and goals

Rafael Iriondo Aurtenetxea (24 October 1918 – 24 February 2016) was a Spanish football forward and manager.

He amassed La Liga totals of 285 matches and 89 goals over 15 seasons, with Athletic Bilbao and Real Sociedad. He subsequently became a manager, working for nearly 30 years and being in charge of both clubs.

== Club career ==
Born in Guernica, Biscay, Iriondo arrived at Basque giants Athletic Bilbao in 1940, from Atlético Tetuán. He made his La Liga debut on 29 September in a 2–2 away draw against Valencia CF and, during his 13-year spell with the club, would form an historic attacking partnership with Agustín Gaínza, José Luis Panizo and Telmo Zarra, winning the 1942–43 league and four Copa del Generalísimo trophies.

Iriondo took part in 332 competitive games for Athletic and scored 116 goals, joining neighbouring Barakaldo CF in 1953. After a couple of months, however, he returned to the top division with Real Sociedad, retiring at the end of the 1954–55 season.

Iriondo started coaching immediately after retiring, with modest SD Indautxu in the Segunda División. He continued in his native region the following years, with Deportivo Alavés and Barakaldo.

In the 1968–69 campaign, Iriondo returned to Athletic Bilbao as head coach, helping the side to the 11th place in the league and the domestic cup. He would also manage them for two full seasons in the mid-1970s, interspersed with stints at RCD Español, Real Zaragoza and Real Sociedad.

Iriondo's last coaching job was with Real Betis: he led the Andalusians to the 1977 Spanish Cup, but suffered top-flight relegation the following season. After 15 matches at Rayo Vallecano in 1980 (meeting the same fate) he returned to Betis for one final campaign in 1981–82, being one of three managers to help the club finish sixth in the top tier and qualify for the UEFA Cup for the first time ever.

== International career ==
Iriondo earned two caps for Spain in as many friendlies, his debut coming on 23 June 1946 in a 0–1 loss to the Republic of Ireland in Madrid. This was the first game of the national team attended by general Francisco Franco.

Seven months later, in Lisbon, he scored against Portugal who won 4–1.

== Death ==
Iriondo died in Bilbao on 24 February 2016, aged 97.

== Honours ==
=== Player ===
Athletic Bilbao

- La Liga: 1942–43
- Copa del Generalísimo: 1943, 1944, 1944–45, 1949–50
- Copa Eva Duarte: 1950

=== Manager ===
Athletic Bilbao

- Copa del Generalísimo: 1969

Betis

- Copa del Rey: 1976–77
