= 1969 Copa del Generalísimo =

67th Copa del Rey

Tournament details
- Country: Spain
- Teams: 16

Final positions
- Champions: Club Atlético de Bilbao (21st title)
- Runners-up: Elche CF

Tournament statistics
- Matches played: 31

The 1969 Copa del Generalísimo was the 67th staging of the Spanish Cup. The competition began on 4 May 1969 and concluded on 15 June 1969 with the final.

== Round of 16 ==
Team 1	Agg.	Team 2	1st leg	2nd leg
Club Atlético de Madrid	2–1	Real Madrid CF	2–1	0–0
RC Deportivo de La Coruña	4–2	UD Las Palmas	2–1	2–1
Elche CF	2–1	Pontevedra CF	2–0	0–1
RCD Español	2–5	CD Málaga	0–3	2–2
Real Sociedad de Fútbol	5–4	CF Barcelona	5–1	0–3
CD Sabadell CF	3–3	Granada CF	3–0	0–3
Valencia CF	3–2	Córdoba CF	2–0	1–2
Real Zaragoza CD	1–2	Club Atlético de Bilbao	1–1	0–1

Source: RSSSF

- Tiebreaker

Team 1	Score	Team 2
CD Sabadell CF	0–1	Granada CF

== Quarter-finals ==
Team 1	Agg.	Team 2	1st leg	2nd leg
Club Atlético de Madrid	2–3	Real Sociedad de Fútbol	1–2	1–1
RC Deportivo de La Coruña	1–3	Club Atlético de Bilbao	0–0	1–3
Granada CF	3–2	CD Málaga	2–1	1–1
Valencia CF	2–3	Elche CF	1–2	1–1

Source: RSSSF

== Semi-finals ==
Team 1	Agg.	Team 2	1st leg	2nd leg
Elche CF	4–4	Real Sociedad de Fútbol	3–0	1–4
Granada CF	1–3	Club Atlético de Bilbao	1–1	0–2

Source: RSSSF

- Tiebreaker

Team 1	Score	Team 2
Elche CF	2–0	Real Sociedad

== Final ==
Team 1	Score	Team 2
Club Atlético de Bilbao	1–0	Elche CF

Copa del Generalísimo
winners
Club Atlético de Bilbao
21st title
