= José Luis Panizo =

Spanish footballer

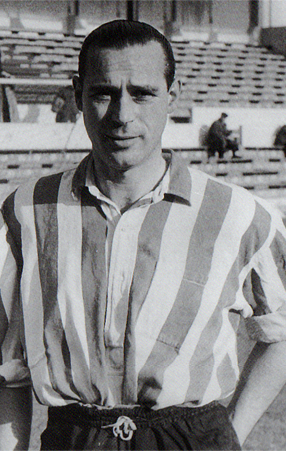

Personal information
- Full name: José Luis López Panizo
- Date of birth: 6 February 1922
- Place of birth: Sestao, Spain
- Date of death: 14 February 1990 (aged 68)
- Place of death: Portugalete, Spain
- Height: 1.73 m (5 ft 8 in)
- Position: Attacking midfielder

Youth career
- Sestao
- 1938–1939: Athletic Bilbao

Senior career*
Years	Team	Apps	(Gls)
1939–1955	Athletic Bilbao	326	(136)
1955–1956	Indautxu	11	(1)
Total		337	(137)

International career
1946–1953	Spain	14	(2)
- * Club domestic league appearances and goals

José Luis López Panizo (6 February 1922 – 14 February 1990) was a Spanish footballer who played as an attacking midfielder.

During 16 seasons he played for Athletic Bilbao, appearing in 413 official matches (179 goals) and winning seven major titles.

== Club career ==
Born in Sestao, Biscay, Panizo arrived at Athletic Bilbao's youth system at the age of 16 from Basque neighbours Sestao Sport Club, almost immediately being promoted to the first team. During 16 professional seasons he would play in 326 La Liga matches, scoring 136 goals (seven years in double digits); in the 1942–43 campaign, as Athletic won the double, he netted 12 in 24 games. He was a member of a noted forward line, headed by Zarra with support from Panizo, Rafael Iriondo and Piru Gaínza

At the age of 33, Panizo moved to another Basque club, modest SD Indautxu of the second tier, closing out his career after one year. His teammates that season included younger brother Óscar, whose career was mostly spent at Barakaldo CF in the same division.

He died eight days after his 68th birthday, in Portugalete.

== International career ==
Panizo made his debut for Spain on 23 June 1946, in a 0–1 friendly loss to the Republic of Ireland in Madrid. In the following seven years he earned a further 13 caps, scoring twice.

Panizo was selected for the squad present at the 1950 FIFA World Cup, appearing four times as the nation reached the second group stage of the competition.

== Honours ==
- La Liga: 1942–43
- Copa del Generalísimo: 1943, 1944, 1944–45, 1949–50
- Copa Eva Duarte: 1950
