= Agustín Gaínza =

Spanish footballer

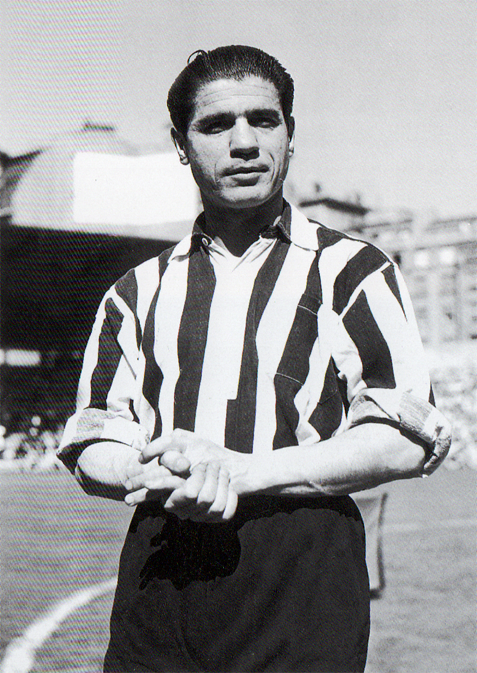

Personal information
- Full name: Agustín Gaínza Vicandi
- Date of birth: 28 May 1922
- Place of birth: Basauri, Spain
- Date of death: 6 January 1995 (aged 72)
- Place of death: Basauri, Spain
- Height: 1.72 m (5 ft 8 in)
- Position: Forward

Youth career
- Athletic Bilbao

Senior career*
Years	Team	Apps	(Gls)
1940–1959	Athletic Bilbao	380	(119)

International career
1945–1955	Spain	33	(10)

Managerial career
- 1964–1965: Bilbao Athletic
- 1965–1968: Athletic Bilbao
- * Club domestic league appearances and goals

Agustín Gaínza Vicandi (28 May 1922 – 6 January 1995) was a Spanish football forward and manager.

== Club career ==
Nicknamed Piru, Gaínza's entire career was spent with Athletic Bilbao. Born in Basauri, Biscay, he made his official debut and scored in a Biscay Championship match on 15 January 1939 against SD Erandio Club, aged 16 years, seven months and 18 days. This made him the club's second-youngest debutant (behind Domingo Acedo in 1914), a statistic which lasted until 2009 when Iker Muniain surpassed the appearance record by seven days and equalled the scoring one the following week.

Gaínza made his La Liga debut on 13 October 1940 in a 1–0 away loss against Hércules CF, then proceeded to play a total of 19 seasons in the competition with the same team, amassing totals of 380 games and 119 goals. During his spell with the Lions of San Mamés he won nine major titles, including two national championships and seven Copa del Generalísimo trophies, plus a Biscay Championship and a Copa Eva Duarte (supercup). In May 1958, he received a testimonial match against English side West Bromwich Albion; coincidentally, the only goalscorer was Ronnie Allen who later became head coach of Athletic and organised further benefit matches between the clubs.

Gaínza retired at the end of the 1958–59 campaign at the age of 37, having appeared in 494 official matches which was a club best at the time of his retirement. Such was his length of service that in addition to being one of its youngest goalscorers he was also the oldest, having found the net for the final time against Sevilla FC in March 1959, aged 36 years and 298 days; that record stood for 58 years, until Aritz Aduriz surpassed it in December 2017.

Gainza also set several Spanish Cup records: he won seven editions, appeared in nine finals, played most for one club in the competition (99 games), and was the highest scorer in a single match, having claimed eight goals in a 12–1 victory over Celta de Vigo in the 1947 quarter-finals after a 1–0 loss in the first leg.

Gaínza coached Athletic during four seasons in the 1960s. He was sacked just six games into 1968–69, being replaced by former teammate Rafael Iriondo who led the side to a domestic cup conquest.

== International career ==
Gaínza won 33 caps for Spain, scoring ten goals. He made his debut on 11 March 1945 in a friendly against Portugal and, as with Athletic, was team captain in the 1950 FIFA World Cup as the country finished in fourth position.

== Personal life ==
Gaínza's older brother, Miguel (1920–86), was also a footballer. A defender, he too played for Athletic Bilbao, and also for Barakaldo CF. It was reported that as a child Agustín was not interested in football and had to be encouraged to play the game by Miguel, and even when approached by Athletic in his teens was reluctant to take it up as a career, with his brother persuading him to agree terms.

Two bronze busts of Gaínza were created by the sculptor José Manuel Alberdi in 1997. One was displayed outside his family home in Basauri (having been donated to the town by the local supporters' club), and the other was situated at the Athletic Bilbao training headquarters at Lezama.

== Death ==
Gaínza died on 6 January 1995 in his hometown, at the age of 72.

== Honours ==
=== Player ===
- La Liga: 1942–43, 1955–56
- Copa del Generalísimo: 1943, 1944, 1944–45, 1949–50, 1955, 1956, 1958; runner-up 1948–49, 1952–53
- Copa Eva Duarte: 1950

=== Manager ===
- Copa del Generalísimo: 1969

== See also ==
- List of one-club men
