= 1944–45 Copa del Generalísimo =

43rd Copa del Rey

Tournament details
- Country: Spain
- Teams: 28

Final positions
- Champions: Atlético de Bilbao (16th title)
- Runners-up: Valencia CF

Tournament statistics
- Matches played: 55

The 1944–45 Copa del Generalísimo was the 43rd staging of the Copa del Rey, the Spanish football cup competition.

The competition began on 31 December 1944 and concluded on 24 June 1945 with the final, when Atlético de Bilbao won their 16th title.

== First round ==
Team 1	Agg.	Team 2	1st leg	2nd leg
Deportivo La Coruña	0–3	Real Sociedad	0–0	0–3
Cultural Leonesa	3–11	Club Atlético de Bilbao	1–3	2–8
RC Celta	3–4	RCD Español	2–3	1–1
Baracaldo CF	5–4	Real Murcia	2–1	3–3
CD Constancia	5–7	Real Oviedo	4–3	1–4
CF Barcelona	10–1	Real Zaragoza	5–1	5–0
CD Sabadell CF	2–5	CD Alcoyano	1–1	1–4
Club Atlético de Aviación	5–2	Real Betis Balompié	4–1	1–1
SD Ceuta	1–9	Real Madrid CF	0–4	1–5
Valencia CF	4–1	Jerez CF	3–0	1–1
Sevilla CF	7–1	RCD Mallorca	6–0	1–1
Granada CF	5–2	Hércules CF	4–2	1–0

Source: RSSSF

- Bye: Real Gijón, CD Castellón, Club Ferrol and Real Santander.

== Round of 16 ==
Team 1	Agg.	Team 2	1st leg	2nd leg
CF Barcelona	2–5	Club Atlético de Bilbao	1–2	1–3
Real Gijón	1–2	Real Oviedo	0–0	1–2
Club Atlético de Aviación	2–0	Club Ferrol	2–0	0–0
Sevilla CF	2–2	Real Madrid CF	1–0	1–2
Valencia CF	3–2	CD Alcoyano	1–0	2–2
Real Santander	2–5	CD Castellón	1–2	1–3
Baracaldo CF	0–7	RCD Español	0–4	0–3
Granada CF	4–2	Real Sociedad	3–0	1–2

Source: RSSSF

- Tiebreaker

Team 1	Score	Team 2
Sevilla CF	2–0	Real Madrid CF

== Quarter-finals ==
Team 1	Agg.	Team 2	1st leg	2nd leg
Club Atlético de Aviación	1–2	Club Atlético de Bilbao	1–2	0–0
CD Castellón	4–4	Granada CF	3–0	1–4
Real Oviedo	2–4	RCD Español	1–2	1–2
Valencia CF	5–3	Sevilla CF	5–1	0–2

Source: RSSSF

- Tiebreaker

Team 1	Score	Team 2
CD Castellón	1–2	Granada CF

== Semi-finals ==
Team 1	Agg.	Team 2	1st leg	2nd leg
Valencia CF	3–2	Granada CF	2–0	1–2
RCD Español	1–4	Club Atlético de Bilbao	0–0	1–4

Source: RSSSF

== Final ==
Team 1	Score	Team 2
Atlético de Bilbao	3–2	Valencia CF

Copa del Generalísimo
winners
Atlético de Bilbao
16th title
