= 1942–43 La Liga =

12th season of La Liga

Primera División
- Season: 1942–43
- Champions: Athletic Bilbao (5th title)
- Relegated: Zaragoza; Real Betis
- Matches: 182
- Goals: 712 (3.91 per match)
- Top goalscorer: Mariano Martín (30 goals)
- Biggest home win: Barcelona 8–0 Celta
- Biggest away win: Sevilla 0–5 Oviedo
- Highest scoring: Celta 8–3 Granada; Valencia 8–3 Real Betis
- Longest winning run: 4 matches Atlético Bilbao; Celta
- Longest unbeaten run: 11 matches Atlético Bilbao
- Longest winless run: 15 matches Zaragoza
- Longest losing run: 5 matches Atlético Aviación

The 1942–43 La Liga was the 12th season since its establishment. Athletic Bilbao achieved their fifth title.

== Team locations ==
Location of teams in 1942–43 La Liga

Club	City	Stadium
Atlético Aviación	Madrid	Metropolitano
Atlético Bilbao	Bilbao	San Mamés
Barcelona	Barcelona	Les Corts
Castellón	Castellón de la Plana	El Sequiol
Celta	Vigo	Balaídos
Deportivo de La Coruña	A Coruña	Riazor
Español	Barcelona	Sarriá
Granada	Granada	Los Cármenes
Oviedo	Oviedo	Buenavista
Real Betis	Seville	Patronato Obrero
Real Madrid	Madrid	Chamartín
Sevilla	Seville	Nervión
Valencia	Valencia	Mestalla
Zaragoza	Zaragoza	Torrero

== League table ==
Pos	Team	Pld	W	D	L	GF	GA	GD	Pts	Qualification or relegation
1	Atlético Bilbao (C)	26	16	4	6	73	38	+35	36	
2	Sevilla	26	15	3	8	63	47	+16	33	
3	Barcelona	26	14	4	8	77	50	+27	32	
4	Castellón	26	13	5	8	41	43	−2	31	
5	Celta	26	14	2	10	52	50	+2	30	
6	Oviedo	26	12	4	10	53	63	−10	28	
7	Valencia	26	10	7	9	58	45	+13	27 (Note: Valencia finished ahead of Atlético Aviación on head-to-head points: Valencia–Atlético Aviación 3–0, Atlético Aviación–Valencia 1–1.)	
8	Atlético Aviación	26	11	5	10	54	44	+10	27	
9	Deportivo de La Coruña	26	7	12	7	35	32	+3	26	
10	Real Madrid	26	10	5	11	52	50	+2	25	
11	Español (O)	26	9	6	11	45	51	−6	24	Qualification for the relegation play-offs
12	Granada (O)	26	9	4	13	56	68	−12	22	Qualification for the relegation play-offs
13	Zaragoza (R)	26	2	9	15	25	57	−32	13	Relegated to the Segunda División
14	Real Betis (R)	26	2	6	18	28	74	−46	10	Relegated to the Segunda División

Source: BDFútbol
Rules for classification: 1) points; 2) head-to-head points; 3) head-to-head goal difference; 4) goal difference; 5) number of goals scored.
(C) Champions; (O) Play-off winners; (R) Relegated

== Results ==
Home \ Away	AAV	ATB	BAR	CAS	CEL	DEP	ESP	GRA	OVI	BET	RMA	SEV	VAL	ZAR
Atlético Aviación	—	2–3	4–0	5–1	3–1	1–2	2–3	7–1	3–0	5–1	2–1	1–0	1–1	3–1
Atlético Bilbao	5–2	—	5–2	4–0	4–0	0–2	2–1	4–1	8–1	5–0	3–2	5–0	5–1	2–0
Barcelona	5–0	1–3	—	7–1	8–0	1–1	2–0	5–2	6–2	4–1	5–5	3–1	1–2	4–1
Castellón	0–0	2–2	0–2	—	5–0	3–1	2–1	3–2	3–0	3–0	3–0	2–0	1–0	3–0
Celta	1–1	4–1	4–2	5–0	—	0–1	3–2	8–3	2–0	4–2	2–1	1–0	2–0	3–2
Deportivo de La Coruña	0–0	2–0	2–2	0–1	3–1	—	2–2	2–2	0–1	0–0	1–2	1–1	2–2	3–1
Español	4–2	2–2	1–3	3–1	1–0	1–1	—	2–1	5–0	3–0	4–2	1–2	1–0	0–0
Granada	3–1	1–3	2–3	1–2	3–1	1–2	2–2	—	3–1	6–2	1–0	4–3	4–2	1–1
Oviedo	2–1	3–3	3–2	4–1	1–0	1–1	3–1	4–2	—	4–1	3–4	4–4	4–1	1–1
Real Betis	1–2	3–1	0–2	1–1	1–3	1–1	1–1	0–1	1–2	—	3–1	2–5	2–2	1–1
Real Madrid	1–3	2–0	3–0	0–0	2–4	4–3	7–0	2–2	2–1	3–1	—	1–1	0–1	2–1
Sevilla	2–1	2–0	4–2	4–1	2–0	2–1	4–2	3–2	0–5	5–0	3–0	—	3–1	6–0
Valencia	3–0	2–2	2–4	1–2	1–1	1–0	3–0	3–2	7–0	8–3	3–3	4–2	—	7–0
Zaragoza	2–2	0–1	1–1	0–0	1–2	1–1	4–2	2–3	1–3	1–0	0–2	3–4	0–0	—

Source: BDFútbol
Legend: Blue = home team win; Yellow = draw; Red = away team win.

== Relegation play-offs ==
Match between Español and Real Gijón was played at Estadio Chamartín in Chamartín de la Rosa, while the other one was held at Camp de Les Corts, Barcelona.

Team 1	Score	Team 2
Español	2–1	Real Gijón
Granada	2–0	Valladolid

== Top scorers ==
Rank	Player	Team	Goals
1	(Spain) Mariano Martín	Barcelona	30
2	(Spain) Mundo	Valencia	23
3	(Spain) Basilio	Castellón	22
3	(Spain) José Juncosa	Española	22
5	(Spain) Zarra	Atlético Bilbao	17
6	(Spain) Mariano Uceda	Atlético Aviación	16
6	(Spain) Manuel Alday	Real Madrid	16
6	(Spain) Francisco Roig	Celta	16
6	(Spain) Pepillo	Sevilla	16
10	(Spain) Paco Campos	Atlético Aviación	15
10	(Spain) Juan del Pino	Celta	15
