= 1949–50 Copa del Generalísimo =

48th Copa del Rey

Tournament details
- Country: Spain
- Teams: 46

Final positions
- Champions: Atlético de Bilbao (17th title)
- Runners-up: Real Valladolid

Tournament statistics
- Matches played: 62

The 1949–50 Copa del Generalísimo was the 48th staging of the Copa del Rey, the Spanish football cup competition.

The competition began on 27 November 1949 and concluded on 28 May 1950 with the final.

== First round ==
| Team 1 | Score | Team 2 |
|---|---|---|
| Orensana | 4–1 | Arosa |
| Gimnástica Lucense | 0–1 | Ferrol |
| Sporting de Gijón | 2–1 | Gimnástica Torrelavega |
| Baracaldo | 1–1 | Erandio |
| Osasuna | 4–2 | Numancia |
| Badalona | 2–1 | Lérida |
| Mestalla | 0–1 | Levante |
| Alcoyano | 3–1 | Albacete |
| Cartagena | 4–1 | Elche |
| Córdoba | 2–3 | Mallorca |
| Salamanca | 1–2 | Plus Ultra |
| Linense | 3–1 | Atlético Tetuán |

=== Replays ===
| Team 1 | Score | Team 2 |
|---|---|---|
| Baracaldo_{1} | 2–0 | Erandio |

1 - Baracaldo won 3–1 on aggregate

== Second round ==
| Team 1 | Score | Team 2 |
|---|---|---|
| Orensana | 0–0 | Ferrol |
| Santander | 4–1 | Sporting de Gijón |
| Baracaldo | 2–0 | Osasuna |
| Plus Ultra | 6–1 | Zaragoza |
| Gerona | 2–1 | Sabadell |
| Badalona | 0–3 | Mallorca |
| Castellón | 0–2 | Valencia |
| Alcoyano | 4–1 | Hèrcules |
| Cartagena | 3–0 | Real Murcia |
| Granada | 2–3 | Linense |

=== Replays ===
| Team 1 | Score | Team 2 |
|---|---|---|
| Orensana | 3–4 | Ferrol_{1} |

1 - Ferrol won 3–4 on aggregate

== Third round ==
| Team 1 | Score | Team 2 |
|---|---|---|
| Ferrol | 0–2 | Real Oviedo |
| Plus Ultra | 1–2 | Santander |
| Real Sociedad | 2–0 | Baracaldo |
| Espanyol | 4–1 | Gerona |
| Gimnàstic Tarragona | 2–1 | Levante |
| Mallorca | 1–0 | Alcoyano |
| Málaga | 2–1 | Cartagena |
| Sevilla | 5–0 | Linense |

== Round of 16 ==
| Team 1 | Agg. | Team 2 | 1st leg | 2nd leg |
|---|---|---|---|---|
| Atlético Bilbao | 2–1 | Espanyol | 1–0 | 1–1 |
| Barcelona | 5–6 | Santander | 4–1 | 1–5 |
| Celta Vigo | 1–2 | Real Oviedo | 1–1 | 0–1 |
| Real Madrid | 8–1 | Gimnástic Tarragona | 1–0 | 7–1 |
| Málaga | 6–7 | Atlético Madrid | 4–3 | 2–4 |
| Mallorca | 3–12 | Valencia | 3–4 | 0–8 |
| Real Sociedad | 1–3 | Valladolid | 0–1 | 1–2 |
| Sevilla | 5–3 | Deportivo La Coruña | 4–2 | 1–1 |

Source: RSSSF

== Quarter-finals ==
| Team 1 | Agg. | Team 2 | 1st leg | 2nd leg |
|---|---|---|---|---|
| Atlético de Bilbao | 13–5 | Real Oviedo | 8–2 | 5–3 |
| Real Madrid | 6–4 | Atlético de Madrid | 6–3 | 0–1 |
| Real Santander | 3–6 | Valencia CF | 3–0 | 0–6 |
| Real Valladolid | 8–4 | Sevilla CF | 6–0 | 2–4 |

Source: RSSSF

== Semi-finals ==
| Team 1 | Agg. | Team 2 | 1st leg | 2nd leg |
|---|---|---|---|---|
| Real Madrid CF | 3–5 | Real Valladolid | 2–2 | 1–3 |
| Atlético de Bilbao | 8–7 | Valencia | 5–1 | 3–6 |

Source: RSSSF

== Final ==
| Team 1 | Score | Team 2 |
|---|---|---|
| Atlético de Bilbao | 4–1 (aet) | Real Valladolid |

Copa del Generalísimo
winners
Atlético de Bilbao
17th title
