= 1935 Iberian Cup =

Porto	Real Betis
Primeira Liga	La Liga
4	2
- Date: 7 July 1935
- Venue: Campo do Ameal, Porto
- Referee: José Pereira (Coimbra)
- Attendance: 15,000

The 1935 Iberian Cup was the first edition of the Iberian Cup, which was contested between FC Porto (Primeira Liga winners) and Real Betis (La Liga winners). It was held on 7 July in Porto, and it was won by the hosts 4–2, thus becoming the first Portuguese club to win an international trophy.

== Participats ==
Clubs	Country	Champions
(Portugal) Porto	Porto	1934–35 Primeira Liga
(Spain) Real Betis	Seville	1934–35 La Liga

== Overview ==
The match was contested by Porto, as they had won the inaugural edition of the Primeira Liga in 1935, and by Real Betis, who had been crowned the national champions of Spain for the first (and only) time in 1935.

In the first half, the home team took the lead with a goal from Pocas, who was making his debut with the first team that day. In the second half, Porto scored twice more in a short period of time, both times thanks to Artur Pinga, thus giving a comfortable 3–0 lead to the home side, but Betis fought back by netting two quick goals of their own via José González Caballero and Victorio Unamuno. The visitants then pressured their opponents in search of an equalizer, which left them vulnerable at the back, and therefore, they ended up conceding another goal from Pinga, who thus sealed both his hat-trick and Porto's victory by 4–2.

Another source states that Porto's goalscorers were Antonio Santos, Pinga (2), and Carlos Nunes, while Betis' goals were both scored by Caballero.

== Matches ==
7 July 1935
1st leg

Porto	4–2	Real Betis
Pocas 1t' Pinga	Report	Caballero; Unamuno

Campo do Ameal, Porto, Spain
Attendance: 15,000
Referee: José Pereira (Coimbra)

GK	1	(Portugal) Soares dos Reis
DF	2	(Portugal) Avelino Martins
DF	3	(Portugal) Jerónimo Faria
MF	4	(Portugal) João Nova
MF	5	(Portugal) Pocas
MF	6	(Portugal) Carlos Pereira
FW	7	(Portugal) Valdemar Mota
FW	8	(Portugal) Pinga
FW	9	(Portugal) António Santos
FW	10	(Portugal) Carlos Nunes
FW	11	(Portugal) Carlos Mesquita
Manager:
József Szabó

GK	1	(Spain) Joaquín Urquiaga
DF	2	(Spain) Pedro Areso
DF	3	(Spain) Serafín Aedo
MF	4	(Spain) Peral
MF	5	(Spain) Francisco Gómez
MF	6	(Spain) Simón Lecue
FW	7	(Spain) Saro
FW	8	(Spain) Adolfo Martín
FW	9	(Spain) Victorio Unamuno
FW	10	(Spain) José González Caballero
FW	11	(Spain) Pepe Valera
Manager:
Patrick O'Connell

== Winner ==
1935 Iberian Cup
Porto
First title

== Aftermatch ==
In 1940, the Spanish and Portuguese federations agreed to play annually an international tournament featuring the four best clubs from each country, which ended up not being held as the Portuguese suddenly gave up on it, either because of the FPF's financial problems or due to a heavy 5–1 defeat that Spain had inflicted on the Lusitanians in January 1940. In 1970, the RFEF received a proposal from FPF to hold a tournament between the two national champions, but it was once again postponed "for further study". In the end, it took nearly half a century for the next Iberian Cup to be held in 1983.
