= Saro (footballer) =

Spanish footballer (1909–1975)

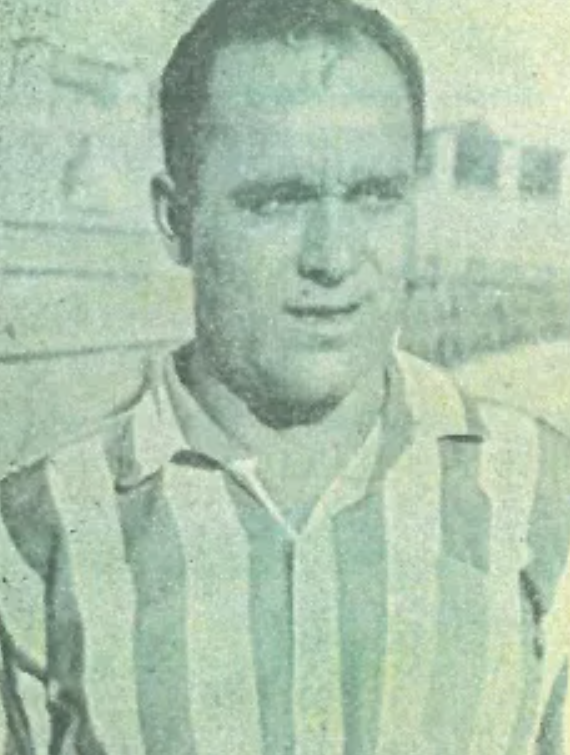
- Saro

Personal information
- Full name: Ángel Martín Rodríguez
- Date of birth: 1 March 1909
- Place of birth: Valladolid, Spain
- Date of death: 13 January 1975 (aged 65)
- Place of death: Sevilla, Spain
- Position: Forward

Youth career
- SD Kaiku

Senior career*
Years	Team	Apps	(Gls)
1927–1928	Sestao		
1928–1933	Arenas de Getxo		
1933–1936	Real Betis		
1939–1949	Real Betis		
- * Club domestic league appearances and goals

Ángel Martín Rodríguez, better known as Saro (1 March 1909 – 13 January 1975) was a Spanish footballer who played as a forward for Real Betis in the 1930s and 1940s.

== Career ==
=== Club career ===
Born in Castile and León town of Valladolid on 1 March 1909, Saro was still young when his family moved to the Basque Country, where he began his career at SD Kaiku, a local children's team, from which he joined Sestao in 1927, aged 18. He soon stood out from the rest, thus becoming a highly valued player sought after by the big clubs, such as Real Sociedad, Athletic Bilbao, but in the end, however, he chose Arenas de Getxo, with whom he played for five years, from 1928 until 1933, when he got paid 6,000 pesetas to sign for Real Betis, where he earned a salary of 600. Saro made his debut with the first team on 27 August 1933, in a friendly match against Hércules, which ended in a 3–0 loss. The following week, on 3 September 1933, he made his official debut for Betis in a Mancomunado Championship match against Deportivo Nacional in Madrid, which ended in a 2–2 draw; Serafín Aedo and Victorio Unamuno also made their Betis debut that day.

Together with Pedro Areso, Adolfo Martín, Peral, he was one of the most used players by coach Patrick O'Connell during Betis' triumphant campaign at the 1934–35 La Liga, the first (and only) league title in the club's history. This victory qualified the club for the 1935 Iberian Cup, which ended in a 4–2 loss to the Primeira Liga champions FC Porto. Despite all of this success, the departure of president Antonio Moreno Sevillano coupled with the outbreak of the Spanish Civil War dismantled the champion team, with the only survivors being Saro, Peral, and Pepe Valera. Once the conflict was over, Saro returned to Betis in 1939, which was relegated to the Second Division in 1940, but he then helped his side return to the top flight by winning the 1941–42 Segunda División.

Saro stayed at the club for over 15 years, from 1933 until he retired in 1949, aged 40, being one of only six players who played for Betis in the First, Second, and Tercera Divisións. In total, he scored 80 goals in 342 official matches, including 48 goals in 236 league matches, of which 27 goals were scored in 156 La Liga matches. His first goal for Betis was scored in a league fixture against Atlético Madrid at the Patronato on 1 October 1933, while his last was a penalty in a Cup match against Badajoz at Heliópolis on 19 March 1948.

In January 1945, the local press described the 36-year-old Saro as "healthy, strong, with splendid abilities, just as many 18 to 20-year-olds would wish for". Noted for his speed and strong shot, Saro preferred to play intelligently, without unnecessary effort, which sometimes caused him to miss opportunities.

=== International career ===
During the Civil War, General Franco saw the opportunity to use football as a positive propaganda tool, but a 2–1 loss to Portugal in Vigo on 28 November 1937 forced Franco's leaders to take extra care with the return match in Lisbon, thus holding several preparatory matches against local teams in December 1937, with Saro getting some playing time against a Seville XI at the Patronato stadium in December. He was ultimately called up to the Spain national team for the unofficial friendly against Portugal, but he remained an unused substitute in a 1–0 loss.

== Death and legacy ==
Peral died in Madrid on 13 January 1975, at the age of 65.

== Honours ==
Real Betis

- Andalusian Regional Championship
  - Runner-up (2): 1939, and 1939–40
- La Liga
  - Champions (1): 1934–35
- Iberian Cup
  - Runner-up (1): 1935
