= Peral (footballer) =

Spanish footballer and manager (1911–1967)

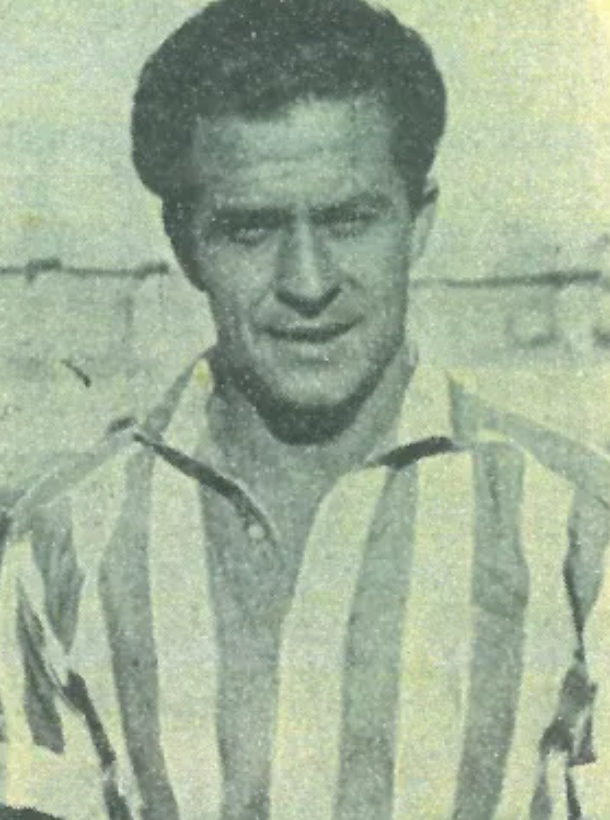
- Peral

Personal information
- Full name: José Suárez González
- Date of birth: 10 April 1911
- Place of birth: Sevilla, Spain
- Date of death: 28 May 1967 (aged 56)
- Place of death: Sevilla, Spain
- Position: Defender

Senior career*
Years	Team	Apps	(Gls)
–1927	Triaca		
1927–1929	Real Betis Cantera		
1929–1936	Real Betis		
1939–1944	Real Betis		
1944	Calavera		

International career
1938	Spain (unofficial)	1	(0)

Managerial career
- 1944: Calavera
- 1944–1945: Real Betis
- 1947: Real Betis
- 1949: Real Betis
- * Club domestic league appearances and goals

José Suárez González, better known as Peral (10 April 1911 – 28 May 1967) was a Spanish footballer who played as a defender for Real Betis between 1929 and 1944. After retiring, he became a manager, taking over Betis on several occasions throughout the 1940s.

He played a crucial role in the great Betis team of the early 1930s, which reached the 1931 Copa del Rey final, and then won the 1931–32 Segunda División and the 1934–35 La Liga, the only league title in the club's history.

== Career ==
=== Club career ===
Born in Andalusian town of Sevilla on 10 April 1911, Peral began his football career at Triaca, a club based in the San Bernardo neighborhood, from which he joined Real Betis Cantera in August 1927, aged 16, making his debut with the first on 27 October 1929, in a friendly match against Sporting Córdoba, which ended in a 1–0 defeat. A few months later, on 11 February 1930, he made his official debut for the team in a Segunda División match against Iberia at the Patronato stadium, which ended in a 1–1 draw.

Together with Rosendo Romero, Adolfo Martín, Andrés Aranda, Peral was a member of the Betis team that reached the 1931 Copa del Rey final at Chamartín, which ended in a 3–1 loss to Athletic Bilbao. The following season, he scored one goal in 17 matches as Betis won the 1931–32 Segunda División, thus achieving promotion to La Liga for the first time. Three years later, he played in all 22 matches of Betis' title-winning 1934–35 La Liga campaign, the first (and only) league title in the club's history. This victory qualified the club for the 1935 Iberian Cup, which ended in a 4–2 loss to the Primeira Liga champions FC Porto. Despite all of this success, the departure of president Antonio Moreno Sevillano coupled with the outbreak of the Spanish Civil War dismantled the champion team, with the only survivors being Peral, Pepe Valera, and Saro.

Once the conflict was over, Peral returned to Betis in 1939, which was relegated to the Second Division in 1940, but he then helped his side return to the top flight by winning the 1941–42 Segunda División. Despite rumours that he was going to retire in the summer of 1942, he ultimately renewed his contract with Betis and played another season back in the top flight, which ended with another relegation. On 10 September 1944, the 33-year-old Peral was the subject of a tribute match against Real Murcia at Heliópolis, which Betis won 3–0.

During his time at Betis, he scored a total of 2 goals in 69 Andalusian Championship matches, 2 goals in 60 Copa del Rey matches, but only one goal in 164 league matches, including one goal in 101 La Liga matches. He also played for the likes of Calavera and Onuba FC (currently known as Recreativo de Huelva).

=== International career ===
During the Civil War, General Franco saw the opportunity to use football as a positive propaganda tool, but a 2–1 loss to Portugal in Vigo on 28 November 1937 forced Franco's leaders to take extra care with the return match in Lisbon, thus holding several preparatory matches against local teams in December 1937, with Peral making his debut in Salamanca, which ended with him between the sticks following an injury to goalkeeper Guillermo Eizaguirre. After two friendlies against a Seville XI, both he and fellow Betis teammate Enrique Soladrero were called up by the Spain national team for the unofficial friendly against Portugal, a 1–0 loss.

The following February, Peral started in two friendlies in North Africa, before he returned to the rearguard. His matches played on behalf of Spain during the Civil War are unrecognized by FIFA.

== Managerial career ==
After retiring, Peral briefly worked as a player-coach of Calavera at the start of the 1944–45 season, from which he joined Real Betis' reserve team. Following the resignation of Andrés Aranda in December 1944, he took over the club's first team, which he oversaw in 14 second division matches, which ended in 7 victories, 2 draws, and 5 losses. This was the first of three occasions on which Peral replaced a coach after their resignation or dismissal, with his second stint consisting of only the last matchday of the 1946–47 season, when relegation to the Tercera División was already confirmed; Betis faced Racing de Santander, then coached by Pedro Areso, a former Betis teammate.

== Later life ==
Peral fiercely defended his club on football talk shows until the mid-1960s; for instance, in 1958, on the occasion of Betis's promotion to the top flight, he stated that "Betis is felt deep within, and there are times I wish I were younger so I could hear its name on the loudspeakers when a match is about to be played".

== Death and legacy ==
Peral died in Seville on 28 May 1967, at the age of 56. A few months later, on 10 August, the Betis president, Pascual Aparicio, requested that the Real Betis Gold Medal be awarded to him posthumously.

== Honours ==
Real Betis

- Andalusian Regional Championship
  - Runner-up (4): 1929–30, 1930–31, 1939, and 1939–40
- Copa del Rey
  - Runner-up (1): 1931
- Segunda División
  - Champions (1): 1931–32
- La Liga
  - Champions (1): 1934–35
- Iberian Cup
  - Runner-up (1): 1935
