= José de la Concha =

José de la Concha may refer to:

- José María de la Concha (1915–2005), Spanish sports leader
- José Gutiérrez de la Concha, 1st Marquess of Havana (1809–1895), Spanish noble
