= József Szabó (footballer, born 1896) =

Hungarian footballer and manager

Personal information
- Date of birth: 11 May 1896
- Place of birth: Gönyű, Austria-Hungary
- Date of death: 17 March 1973 (aged 76)
- Positions: Defender; midfielder

Senior career*
Years	Team	Apps	(Gls)
1915–1919	Győr		
1919–1924	Ferencváros	101	(4)
1924	Győr		
1924–1925	Szombathelyi AK		
1926	Szombathelyi Haladás		
1926–1927	Nacional		
1927–1928	Marítimo		
1928–1932	Porto		

International career
1920–1923	Hungary	6	(0)

Managerial career
- 1928–1935: Porto
- 1935–1936: Braga
- 1936–1945: Sporting CP
- 1945: Braga
- 1945–1947: Porto
- 1947–1948: Olhanense
- 1948–1949: Portimonense
- 1949–1950: Oriental
- 1950–1952: Braga
- 1952–1953: Atlético
- 1953–1955: Sporting CP
- 1955–1956: Caldas
- 1956–1957: Braga
- 1957–1958: Leixões
- 1958–1959: Torrense
- 1959–1960: Caldas
- 1960–1961: Braga
- 1961–1962: Portimonense
- 1962–1964: Barreirense
- 1965–1966: Angola
- * Club domestic league appearances and goals

József Szabó (11 May 1896 – 17 March 1973), also referred to as Joseph Szabo or José Szabo, was a former Hungarian footballer and football manager. As a player, he played for both Ferencvárosi TC and Hungary.

He coached a large number of Portuguese teams, including FC Porto, Sporting Clube de Portugal and Sporting Braga.

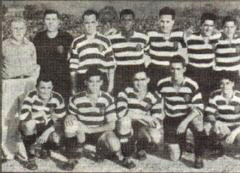
Szabó, first to the left

== Honours ==
=== Player ===
Ferencvárosi

- Magyar Kupa: 1921–22

FC Porto

- Portuguese Cup: 1931–32 (Player-coach)
- Porto Championship (4): 1928–29, 1929–30, 1930–31, 1931–32 (Player-coach)

=== Manager ===
FC Porto

- Portuguese Liga: 1934–35
- Portuguese Cup: 1931–32
- Porto Championship (10): 1928–29, 1929–30, 1930–31, 1931–32, 1932–33, 1933–34, 1934–35, 1935–36, 1945–46, 1946–47
- Iberian Cup: 1935

Sporting CP

- Portuguese Liga (3): 1940–41, 1943–44, 1953–54
- Portuguese Cup (4): 1935–36, 1937–38, 1940–41, 1953–54
- Lisbon Championship (7): 1936–37, 1937–38, 1938–39, 1940–41, 1941–42, 1942–43, 1944–45
- Taca Imperio: 1943–44
