= Spain national football team results (1960–1979) =

Football matches results

These are all the matches played by the Spain national football team between 1960 and 1979:

== Meaning ==
	Meaning
S.O.	Summer Olympics
W.C.	FIFA World Cup
EURO	UEFA European Championship
CC	FIFA Confederations Cup
TB	Tie-break match
Q	Qualification rounds
R + number	Round number
FR	Final round
GS	Group stage
1/32	Round of 32
1/16	Round of 16
QF	Quarter-final
SF	Semi-final
F	Final
RP	Repechage
Rep.	Replay match
3rd–4th	Third place match

== Results ==
119 matches played:

=== 1960s ===
13 March 1960 Friendly	Spain	3–1	Italy	(Spain) Estadi del CF Barcelona, Barcelona
	Vergés 53'; Di Stéfano 60'; Eulogio Martínez 85'		38' Lojacono

15 May 1960 Friendly	Spain	3–0	England	(Spain) Santiago Bernabéu, Madrid
	Peiró 38'; Eulogio Martínez 79', 85'

10 July 1960 Friendly	Peru	1–3	Spain	(Peru) Coloso de José Díaz, Lima
	Carrasco 54'		21' Di Stéfano; 44', 50' Suárez

14 July 1960 Friendly	Chile	0–4	Spain	(Chile) Nacional Julio Martínez Prádanos, Ñuñoa
			9', 33' Di Stéfano; 46' (pen.) Collar; 57' Eulogio Martínez

17 July 1960 Friendly	Chile	1–4	Spain	(Chile) Nacional Julio Martínez Prádanos, Ñuñoa
	Musso 85'		1', 29' Di Stéfano; 37' Pereda; 40' Peiró

24 July 1960 Friendly	Argentina	2–0	Spain	(Argentina) Monumental, Buenos Aires
	Sanfilippo 30', 37'

26 October 1960 Friendly	England	4–2	Spain	(England) Wembley, London
	Greaves 1'; Douglas 40'; Smith 67', 81'		11' Del Sol; 52' Suárez

30 October 1960 Friendly	Austria	3–0	Spain	(Austria) Praterstadion, Vienna
	Senekowitsch 33'; Nemec 76'; Buzek 79'

2 April 1961 Friendly	Spain	2–0	France	(Spain) Santiago Bernabéu, Madrid
	Gensana 30'; Gento 53'

19 April 1961 (Chile) 1962 W.C. Q	Wales	1–2	Spain	(Wales) Ninian Park, Cardiff
	Woosnam 7'		20' Foncho; 78' Di Stéfano

18 May 1961 (Chile) 1962 W.C. Q	Spain	1–1	Wales	(Spain) Santiago Bernabéu, Madrid
	Peiró 54'		69' Allchurch

11 June 1961 Friendly	Spain	2–0	Argentina	(Spain) Ramón Sánchez Pizjuán, Sevilla
	Del Sol 63'; Di Stéfano 73'

12 November 1961 (Chile) 1962 W.C. Q	Morocco	0–1	Spain	(Morocco) Marcel Cerdan, Casablanca
			80' Del Sol

23 November 1961 (Chile) 1962 W.C. Q	Spain	3–2	Morocco	(Spain) Santiago Bernabéu, Madrid
	Marcelino 11'; Di Stéfano 44'; Collar 60'		40' Riahi; 65' Abdallah

10 December 1961 Friendly	France	1–1	Spain	(France) Yves-du-Manoir, Colombes
	Heutte 13'		59' Félix Ruiz

31 May 1962 (Chile) 1962 W.C. GS	Czechoslovakia	1–0	Spain	(Chile) Sausalito, Viña del Mar
21:00 CEST	Štibrányi 80'			Attendance: 12,700; Referee: (Austria) Carl Erich Steiner

3 June 1962 (Chile) 1962 W.C. GS	Spain	1–0	Mexico	(Chile) Sausalito, Viña del Mar
21:00 CEST	Peiró 89'			Attendance: 11,875; Referee: (Socialist Federal Republic of Yugoslavia) Branko Tesanić

6 June 1962 (Chile) 1962 W.C. GS	Brazil	2–1	Spain	(Chile) Sausalito, Viña del Mar
21:00 CEST	Amarildo 71', 86'		34' Adelardo	Attendance: 18,715; Referee: (Chile) Sergio Bustamante

1 November 1962 (Spain) 1964 EURO Q	Spain	6–0	Romania	(Spain) Santiago Bernabéu, Madrid
20:45 CET	Guillot 7', 27', 70'; Veloso 9'; Collar 17'; Nunweiller 81' (o.g.)			Attendance: 45,000; Referee: (England) Kevin Howley

25 November 1962 (Spain) 1964 EURO Q	Romania	3–1	Spain	(Romania) 23 August, Bucharest
13:00 CET	Tătaru 2'; Manolache 7'; Constantin 60'		66' Veloso	Attendance: 72,762; Referee: (Greece) Georgios Pelomis

2 December 1962 Friendly	Belgium	1–1	Spain	(Belgium) Heizelstadion, Brussels
	Jurion 50'		31' Guillot

9 January 1963 Friendly	Spain	0–0	France	(Spain) Estadi del CF Barcelona, Barcelona

30 May 1963 (Spain) 1964 EURO Q	Spain	1–1	Northern Ireland	(Spain) San Mamés, Bilbao
	Amancio 58'		75' Irvine	Attendance: 27,960; Referee: (Italy) Cesare Jonni

13 June 1963 Friendly	Spain	2–6	Scotland	(Spain) Santiago Bernabéu, Madrid
	Adelardo 8'; Veloso 44'		15' Denis Law; 16' Dave Gibson; 19' Frank McLintock; 34' Davie Wilson; 51' Willie Henderson; 82' Ian St. John	Attendance: 40,000; Referee: (Italy) Giulio Campanati

30 October 1963 (Spain) 1964 EURO Q	Northern Ireland	0–1	Spain	(Northern Ireland) Windsor Park, Belfast
			65' Gento	Attendance: 45,809; Referee: (Netherlands) Andries van Leeuwen

1 December 1963 Friendly	Spain	1–2	Belgium	(Spain) Mestalla, Valencia
	Zoco 22'		19' van den Berg; 61' Puis	Attendance: 50,000; Referee: (France) Marcel Bois

11 March 1964 (Spain) 1964 EURO Q	Spain	5–1	Republic of Ireland	(Spain) Ramón Sánchez Pizjuán, Sevilla
	Amancio 13', 29'; Fusté 15'; Marcelino 33', 88'		22' McEvoy	Attendance: 27,137; Referee: (Belgium) Lucien van Nuffel

8 April 1964 (Spain) 1964 EURO Q	Republic of Ireland	0–2	Spain	(Republic of Ireland) Dalymount Park, Dublin
			24', 86' Zaballa	Attendance: 38,027; Referee: (Belgium) Gérard Versyp

17 June 1964 (Spain) 1964 EURO SF	Hungary	1 – 2 (AET)	Spain	(Spain) Santiago Bernabéu, Madrid
20:00 CEST	Albert 85'		35' Pereda; 112' Amancio	Attendance: 34,713; Referee: (Belgium) Arthur Blavier

21 June 1964 (Spain) 1964 EURO F	Spain	2–1	Soviet Union	(Spain) Santiago Bernabéu, Madrid
18:30 CEST	Pereda 5'; Marcelino 83'		8' Khusainov	Attendance: 79,115; Referee: (England) Arthur Holland

15 November 1964 Friendly	Portugal	2–1	Spain	(Portugal) Das Antas, Porto
	Eusébio 39', 70'		25' Fusté	Referee: (Netherlands) Piet Roomer

5 May 1965 (England) 1966 W.C. Q	Republic of Ireland	1–0	Spain	(Republic of Ireland) Dalymount Park, Dublin
	Iríbar 61' (o.g.)

8 May 1965 Friendly	Scotland	0–0	Spain	(Scotland) Hampden Park, Glasgow

1965 (England) 1966 W.C. Q	Syria	0 – 3 (FIFA decision)	Spain	Not Played

1965 (England) 1966 W.C. Q	Spain	3 – 0 (FIFA decision)	Syria	Not Played

27 October 1965 (England) 1966 W.C. Q	Spain	4–1	Republic of Ireland	(Spain) Ramón Sánchez Pizjuán, Sevilla
	Pereda 39', 43', 67'; Lapetra 73'		27' McEvoy

10 November 1965 (England) 1966 W.C. TB	Spain	1–0	Republic of Ireland	(France) Parc des Princes, Paris
	Ufarte 82'

8 December 1965 Friendly	Spain	0–2	England	(Spain) Santiago Bernabéu, Madrid
		Report	8' Baker; 58' Hunt	Attendance: 25,000; Referee: Concetto Lo Bello (Italy)

23 June 1966 Friendly	Spain	1–1	Uruguay	(Spain) Riazor, A Coruña
	Gento 76'		45' Pérez	Referee: (Portugal) Anibal da Silva da Oliveira

13 July 1966 (England) 1966 W.C. GS	Argentina	2–1	Spain	(England) Villa Park, Birmingham
20:30 CEST	Artime 65', 79'		71' Pirri	Attendance: 48,000; Referee: (Bulgaria) Dimiter Rumentchev

15 July 1966 (England) 1966 W.C. GS	Spain	2–1	Switzerland	(England) Hillsborough, Sheffield
20:30 CEST	Sanchís 58'; Amancio 75'		29' Quentin	Attendance: 32,000; Referee: (Soviet Union) Tofik Bakhramov

20 July 1966 (England) 1966 W.C. GS	West Germany	2–1	Spain	(England) Villa Park, Birmingham
20:30 CEST	Emmerich 39'; Seeler 84'		25' Fusté	Attendance: 51,000; Referee: (Brazil) Armando Marques

23 October 1966 (Italy) 1968 EURO Q	Republic of Ireland	0–0	Spain	(Republic of Ireland) Dalymount Park, Dublin
15:30 CEST				Attendance: 38,877; Referee: (Sweden) Hans Carlsson

7 December 1966 (Italy) 1968 EURO Q	Spain	2–0	Republic of Ireland	(Spain) Mestalla, Valencia
	José María 22'; Pirri 36'			Attendance: 25,000; Referee: (Netherlands) Pieter Romer

1 February 1967 (Italy) 1968 EURO Q	Turkey	0–0	Spain	(Turkey) Ali Sami Yen, Istanbul
				Attendance: 27,262; Referee: (Hungary) Gyula Gere

24 May 1967 Friendly	England	2–0	Spain	(England) Wembley, London
	Greaves 70'; Hunt 75'	Report		Attendance: 75,000; Referee: István Zsolt (Hungary)

31 May 1967 (Italy) 1968 EURO Q	Spain	2–0	Turkey	(Spain) San Mamés, Bilbao
	Grosso 63'; Gento 81'			Attendance: 27,336; Referee: (Switzerland) Othmar Huber

1 October 1967 (Italy) 1968 EURO Q	Czechoslovakia	1–0	Spain	(Czechoslovakia) Evžena Rošického, Prague
15:00 CEST	Horváth 48'			Attendance: 20,354; Referee: (West Germany) Gerhard Schulenburg

22 October 1967 (Italy) 1968 EURO Q	Spain	2–1	Czechoslovakia	(Spain) Santiago Bernabéu, Madrid
20:00 CEST	Pirri 32'; Gárate 60'		75' Kuna	Attendance: 25,314; Referee: (Italy) Antonio Sbardella

28 February 1968 Friendly	Spain	3–1	Sweden	(Spain) Ramón Sánchez Pizjuán, Sevilla
	Rifé 20'; Amancio 24', 67'	Report	16' Ejderstedt	Attendance: 18,000; Referee: (Portugal) Joaquim Fernandes-Campos

3 April 1968 (Italy) 1968 EURO Q	England	1–0	Spain	(England) Wembley, London
20:45 CEST	Charlton 85'			Attendance: 100,000; Referee: (Switzerland) Gilbert Droz

2 May 1968 Friendly	Sweden	1–1	Spain	(Sweden) Malmoe, Malmö
	Nordahl 13'	Report	72' Castellano	Attendance: 27,275; Referee: (West Germany) Hans-Joachim Weyland

8 May 1968 (Italy) 1968 EURO Q	Spain	1–2	England	(Spain) Santiago Bernabéu, Madrid
20:30 CEST	Amancio 47'		54' Peters; 81' Hunter	Attendance: 120,000; Referee: (Czechoslovakia) Josef Krnavek

17 October 1968 Friendly	France	1–3	Spain	(France) Stade de Gerland, Lyons
	Blanchet 22'	Report	Pirri 59'; Ufarte 74'; Aragonés 84'	Attendance: 35,000; Referee: Aurelio Angonese (Italy)

27 October 1968 (Mexico) 1970 W.C. Q	Yugoslavia	0–0	Spain	(Socialist Federal Republic of Yugoslavia) Crvena Zvezda, Belgrade

11 December 1968 (Mexico) 1970 W.C. Q	Spain	1–1	Belgium	(Spain) Santiago Bernabéu, Madrid
	Gárate 76'		2' Devrindt

23 February 1969 (Mexico) 1970 W.C. Q	Belgium	2–1	Spain	(Belgium) Sclessin, Liège
	Devrindt 33', 73'		74' Asensi

26 March 1969 Friendly	Spain	1–0	Switzerland	(Spain) Luís Casanova, Valencia
	Bustillo 20'			Attendance: 10,000; Referee: (France) Robert Lacoste

23 April 1969 Friendly	Spain	0–0	Mexico	(Spain) Ramón Sánchez Pizjuán, Sevilla

30 April 1969 (Mexico) 1970 W.C. Q	Spain	2–1	Yugoslavia	(Spain) Estadi del CF Barcelona, Barcelona
	Bustillo 20'; Amancio 27'		66' Pavlovic

25 June 1969 (Mexico) 1970 W.C. Q	Finland	2–0	Spain	(Finland) Helsingin Olympiastadion, Töölö
	Lindholm 7'; Tolsa 20'

15 October 1969 (Mexico) 1970 W.C. Q	Spain	6–0	Finland	(Spain) La Línea de la Concepción, Cádiz
	Pirri 6'; Gárate 20', 42'; Velázquez 22'; Amancio 45'; Quino 85'

=== 1970s ===
11 February 1970 Friendly	Spain	2–0	West Germany	(Spain) Sevilla
	Arieta 17', 41'			Stadium: Ramón Sánchez Pizjuán

21 February 1970 Friendly	Spain	2–2	Italy	(Spain) Madrid
	Arieta 23'; Salvadore 25' (o.g.)		11' Anastasi; 18' Riva	Stadium: Santiago Bernabéu

22 April 1970 Friendly	Switzerland	0–1	Spain	(Switzerland) Lausanne
			7' Rojo	Stadium: La Pontaise

28 October 1970 Friendly	Spain	2–1	Greece	(Spain) Zaragoza
	Aragonés 22'; Quini 69'		87' Gioutsos	Stadium: La Romareda

11 November 1970 (Belgium) 1972 EURO Qualification	Spain	3–0	Northern Ireland	(Spain) Sevilla
20:30 CET	Rexach 39'; Pirri 59'; Aragonés 77'			Stadium: Ramón Sánchez Pizjuán; Attendance: 26,215; Referee: (Hungary) Gyula Emsberger

20 February 1971 Friendly	Italy	1–2	Spain	(Italy) Cagliari
	De Sisti 79'		35' Pirri; 40' Uriarte	Stadium: Sant'Elia

17 March 1971 Friendly	Spain	2–2	France	(Spain) Valencia
	Pirri 61', 63'		14', 54' Revelli	Stadium: Estadio Luis CasanovaLuis Casanova

9 May 1971 (Belgium) 1972 EURO; Qualification	Cyprus	0–2	Spain	(Cyprus) Nicosia
16:30 CEST			3' Pirri; 85' Violeta	Stadium: GSP; Attendance: 5,818; Referee: (Romania) Constantin Bărbulescu

30 May 1971 (Belgium) 1972 EURO Qualification	Soviet Union	2–1	Spain	(Soviet Union) Moscow
18:30 CEST	Kolotov 79'; Shevchenko 83'		88' Rexach	Stadium: Central Lenin; Attendance: 81,700; Referee: (West Germany) Ferdinand Biwersi

27 October 1971 (Belgium) 1972 EURO Qualification	Spain	0–0	Soviet Union	(Spain) Sevilla
				Stadium: Ramón Sánchez Pizjuán; Attendance: 40,169; Referee: (England) Norman Burtenshaw

24 November 1971 (Belgium) 1972 EURO Qualification	Spain	7–0	Cyprus	(Spain) Granada
20:00 CET	Pirri 9', 46' (pen.); Quino 12', 24'; Aguilar 63'; Lora 66'; Rojo 75'			Stadium: Viejo Los Cármenes; Attendance: 19,176; Referee: (Malta) Joseph Cassar Naudi

12 January 1972 Friendly	Spain	1–0	Hungary	(Spain) Madrid
	Arieta 82'			Stadium: Santiago Bernabéu

16 February 1972 (Belgium) 1972 EURO Qualification	Northern Ireland	1–1	Spain	(England) Kingston upon Hull
16:00 CET	Morgan 72'		40' Rojo	Stadium: Boothferry Park; Attendance: 19,925; Referee: (England) Jack Taylor

12 April 1972 Friendly	Greece	0–0	Spain	(Greece) Thessaloniki
				Stadium: Kaftanzoglio

23 May 1972 Friendly	Spain	2–0	Uruguay	(Spain) Madrid
	Valdez 8'; Gárate 78'			Stadium: Vicente Calderón

11 October 1972 Friendly	Spain	1–0	Argentina	(Spain) Madrid
	Asensi 33'			Stadium: Santiago Bernabéu

19 October 1972 (West Germany) 1974 World Cup qualification	Spain	2–2	Yugoslavia	(Spain) Las Palmas, Canary Islands
	Amancio 30'; Asensi 89'		52', 61' Bajević	Stadium: Insular

17 January 1973 (West Germany) 1974 World Cup qualification	Greece	2–3	Spain	(Greece) Athens
	Koudas 54'; Domazos 82'		38', 85' Valdez; 71' Claramunt

21 February 1973 (West Germany) 1974 World Cup qualification	Spain	3–1	Greece	(Spain) Málaga
	Claramunt 29'; Sol 38'; Martínez 77'		36' Antoniadis	Stadium: La Rosaleda

2 May 1973 Friendly	Netherlands	3–2	Spain	(Netherlands) Amsterdam
	Rep 12'; Reina 42' (o.g.); Cruyff 90'		19', 48' Valdez	Stadium: Olympic Stadium

17 October 1973 Friendly	Turkey	0–0	Spain	(Turkey) Istanbul
				Stadium: Mithat Pasha

19 October 1973 (West Germany) 1974 World Cup qualification	Yugoslavia	0–0	Spain	(Socialist Federal Republic of Yugoslavia) Zagreb
				Stadium: Maksimir

24 November 1973 Friendly	West Germany	2–1	Spain	(West Germany) Stuttgart
	Heynckes 13', 37'		53' Claramunt	Stadium: Neckarstadion

13 February 1974 (West Germany) 1974 World Cup Tie-breaker	Yugoslavia	1–0	Spain	(West Germany) Frankfurt
	Katalinski 13'			Stadium: Waldstadion

23 February 1974 Friendly	Spain	1–0	West Germany	(Spain) Barcelona
	Asensi 20'			Stadium: Sarrià

25 September 1974 (Socialist Federal Republic of Yugoslavia) 1976 EURO Qualification	Denmark	1–2	Spain	(Denmark) Copenhagen
19:00 CEST	Nygaard 48' (pen.)		28' (pen.) Claramunt; 41' Martínez	Stadium: Idrætsparken; Attendance: 27,300; Referee: (Republic of Ireland) John Carpenter

12 October 1974 Friendly	Argentina	1–1	Spain	(Argentina) Buenos Aires
	Rogel 83'		82' Pirri	Stadium: Monumental

20 November 1974 (Socialist Federal Republic of Yugoslavia) 1976 EURO Qualification	Scotland	1–2	Spain	(Scotland) Glasgow
21:00 CET; 20:00 Local time	Bremner 10'		36', 61' Quini	Stadium: Hampden Park; Attendance: 94,331; Referee: (Austria) Erich Linemayr

5 February 1975 (Socialist Federal Republic of Yugoslavia) 1976 EURO Qualification	Spain	1–1	Scotland	(Spain) Valencia
20:30 CET	Megido 67'		1' Jordan	Stadium: Estadio Luis CasanovaLuis Casanova; Attendance: 40,952; Referee: (Belgium) Alfred Delcourt

17 April 1975 (Socialist Federal Republic of Yugoslavia) 1976 EURO Qualification	Spain	1–1	Romania	(Spain) Madrid
20:30 CEST	Velázquez 6'		70' Crişan	Stadium: Santiago Bernabéu; Attendance: 100,000; Referee: (Netherlands) Charles Corver

12 October 1975 (Socialist Federal Republic of Yugoslavia) 1976 EURO Qualification	Spain	2–0	Denmark	(Spain) Barcelona
20:30 CEST	Pirri 41'; Capón 82'			Stadium: Sarrià; Attendance: 20,000; Referee: (Malta) Paul Bonett

16 November 1975 (Socialist Federal Republic of Yugoslavia) 1976 EURO Qualification	Romania	2–2	Spain	(Romania) Bucharest
14:00 CET	Georgescu 71' (pen.); Iordănescu 80'		29' Villar; 57' Santillana	Stadium: 23 August; Attendance: 45,381; Referee: (West Germany) Hans-Joachim Weyland

24 April 1976 (Socialist Federal Republic of Yugoslavia) 1976 EURO Qualification	Spain	1–1	West Germany	(Spain) Madrid
21:00 CEST	Santillana 20'		60' Beer	Stadium: Vicente Calderón; Attendance: 51,771; Referee: (England) Jack Taylor

22 May 1976 (Socialist Federal Republic of Yugoslavia) 1976 EURO Qualification	West Germany	2–0	Spain	(West Germany) Munich
16:00 CEST	Hoeneß 17'; Toppmöller 43'			Stadium: Olympiastadion; Attendance: 77,673; Referee: (France) Robert Wurtz

10 October 1976 (Argentina) 1978 World Cup qualification	Spain	1–0	Yugoslavia	(Spain) Sevilla
	Pirri 86' (pen.)			Stadium: Ramón Sánchez Pizjuán; Attendance: 19,217; Referee: (Hungary) Károly Palotai

9 February 1977 Friendly	Republic of Ireland	0–1	Spain	(Republic of Ireland) Dublin
			10' Satrústegui	Stadium: Lansdowne Road; Attendance: 22,000; Referee: (England) John Hunting

27 March 1977 Friendly	Spain	1–1	Hungary	(Spain) Alicante
	Juanito 68'		58' Pusztai	Stadium: Rico Pérez; Attendance: 25,000; Referee: (France) Michel Vautrot

16 April 1977 (Argentina) 1978 World Cup qualification	Romania	1–0	Spain	(Romania) Bucharest
	Benito 6' (o.g.)			Stadium: Steaua; Attendance: 18,500; Referee: (Scotland) John Gordon

21 September 1977 Friendly	Switzerland	1–2	Spain	(Switzerland) Bern
	Elsener 43'		48' Cano; 56' Ufarte	Stadium: Wankdorfstadion; Attendance: 13,000; Referee: (West Germany) Ferdinand Biwersi

26 October 1977 (Argentina) 1978 World Cup qualification	Spain	2–0	Romania	(Spain) Madrid
	Leal 74'; Cano 83'			Stadium: Vicente Calderón; Attendance: 18,500; Referee: (France) Robert Wurtz

30 November 1977 (Argentina) 1978 World Cup qualification	Yugoslavia	0–1	Spain	(Socialist Federal Republic of Yugoslavia) Belgrade
			71' Cano	Stadium: Crvena Zvezda; Attendance: 66,285; Referee: (England) Ken Burns

25 January 1978 Friendly	Spain	2–1	Italy	(Spain) Madrid
	Pirri 10' (pen.); Dani 56'		83' Tardelli	Stadium: Santiago Bernabéu; Attendance: 10,000; Referee: (France) Robert Wurtz

29 March 1978 Friendly	Spain	3–0	Norway	(Spain) Gijón
	Quini 6'; Villar 22'; Dani 60'			Stadium: El Molinón; Attendance: 25,000; Referee: (Czechoslovakia) Vojtech Christov

26 April 1978 Friendly	Spain	2–0	Mexico	(Spain) Granada
	Quini 6'; Dani 16'			Stadium: Viejo Los Cármenes; Referee: (France) Alain Delmer

24 May 1978 Friendly	Uruguay	0–0	Spain	(Uruguay) Montevideo
				Stadium: Centenario; Referee: (Uruguay) Héctor Rodríguez

3 June 1978 (Argentina) 1978 World Cup group stage	Austria	2–1	Spain	(Argentina) Buenos Aires
19:45 CEST	Schachner 10'; Krankl 79'		21' Dani	Stadium: José Amalfitani; Attendance: 40,841; Referee: (Hungary) Károly Palotai

7 June 1978 (Argentina) 1978 World Cup group stage	Brazil	0–0	Spain	(Argentina) Mar del Plata
19:45 CEST			(penalty missed) Cardeñosa	Stadium: José Maria Minella; Attendance: 34,771; Referee: (Italy) Sergio Gonella

11 June 1978 (Argentina) 1978 World Cup group stage	Spain	1–0	Sweden	(Argentina) Buenos Aires
19:45 CEST	Asensi 76'			Stadium: José Amalfitani; Attendance: 46,765; Referee: (West Germany) Ferdinand Biwersi

4 October 1978 (Italy) 1980 EURO Qualification	Yugoslavia	1–2	Spain	(Socialist Federal Republic of Yugoslavia) Zagreb
	Halilhodžić 44'		19' Juanito; 31' Santillana	Stadium: Maksimir; Attendance: 50,000; Referee: (Austria) Erich Linemayr

8 November 1978 Friendly	France	1–0	Spain	(France) Paris
	Specht 41'			Stadium: Parc des Princes; Attendance: 37,897; Referee: (West Germany) Walter Eschweiler

15 November 1978 (Italy) 1980 EURO Qualification	Spain	1–0	Romania	(Spain) Valencia
	Asensi 9'			Stadium: Estadio Luis CasanovaLuis Casanova; Attendance: 50,000; Referee: (Netherlands) Jan Keizer

13 December 1978 (Italy) 1980 EURO Qualification	Spain	5–0	Cyprus	(Spain) Villares de la Reina
	Asensi 8'; Del Bosque 10'; Santillana 52', 77'; Cano 66'			Stadium: El Helmántico; Attendance: 17,500; Referee: (Malta) Paul Bonett

21 December 1978 Friendly	Italy	1–0	Spain	(Italy) Roma
	Rossi 31'			Stadium: Olimpico; Attendance: 28,685; Referee: (Bulgaria) Nikola Dudin

14 March 1979 Friendly	Czechoslovakia	1–0	Spain	(Czechoslovakia) Liberec
	Masný 87'			Stadium: U Nisy; Attendance: 40,000; Referee: (Hungary) László Pádár

4 April 1979 (Italy) 1980 EURO; Qualification	Romania	2–2	Spain	(Romania) Craiova
	Georgescu 55' (pen.), 64'		57', 69' Dani	Stadium: Ion Oblemenco; Attendance: 40,000; Referee: (Belgium) Marcel van Langenhove

26 September 1979 Friendly	Spain	1–1	Portugal	(Spain) Vigo (Pontevedra)
	Dani 26' (pen.)		74' (pen.) Nené	Stadium: Balaídos; Attendance: 35,000; Referee: (Italy) Luigi Agnolin

10 October 1979 (Italy) 1980 EURO Qualification	Spain	0–1	Yugoslavia	(Spain) Valencia
			5' Šurjak	Stadium: Luis Casanova; Attendance: 40,000; Referee: (Scotland) Brian McGinlay

14 November 1979 Friendly	Spain	1–3	Denmark	(Spain) Cádiz
	Mesa 56'		38', 77' Elkjær; 55' Bertelsen	Stadium: Ramón de Carranza; Attendance: 18,000; Referee: (Belgium) Roger Schoeters

9 December 1979 (Italy) 1980 EURO Qualification	Cyprus	1–3	Spain	(Cyprus) Limassol
	Vrahimis 69'		5' Villar; 41' Santillana; 89' Saura	Stadium: Tsirion; Attendance: 15,000; Referee: (Austria) Josef Bucek

== See also ==
- Spain national football team results
- Spain national football team results (1920–1939)
- Spain national football team results (1940–1959)
- Spain national football team results (1980–1989)
- Spain national football team results (1990–1999)
