= Spain national football team results (1940–1959) =

These are all the matches played by the Spain national football team between 1940 and 1959. Throughout this period they played in 63 matches, resulting in 28 victories, 19 draws and 16 defeats. Spain played in one FIFA World Cup, the 1950 edition, where they finished fourth.

== Results ==
63 matches played:

Key
| Colour (with score) | Meaning |
|---|---|
| | Defeat |
| | Draw |
| | Win |

== 1940s ==
| 12 January 1941 Friendly | Portugal | 2–2 | Spain | (Portugal) Lisbon |
| 15:00 (UTC) | Pereira 59'; Peyroteo 80' | Report | 9' Campanal; 50' Escolà | Attendance: 25,000; Referee: (Italy) Rinaldo Barlassina |

| 16 March 1941 Friendly | Spain | 5–1 | Portugal | (Spain) San Mamés, Bilbao |
| 15:30 (UTC+1:00) | Herrerita 9'; Campanal 23'; Campos 25'; Epi 75', 85' | Report | 63' Pinga | Attendance: 25,000; Referee: (Germany) Peco Bauwens |

| 28 December 1941 Friendly | Spain | 3–2 | Switzerland | (Spain) Nervión, Sevilla |
| 15:30 (UTC+1:00) | Campos 5'; Mundo 64', 69' | Report | 25' Kappenberger; 88' Aeby | Attendance: 21,000; Referee: (Portugal) Carlos Canuto |

| 15 March 1942 Friendly | Spain | 4–0 | France | (Spain) Nervión, Sevilla |
| 16:30 (UTC+1:00) | Campos 4', 68'; Mundo 38'; Epi 85' | Report | | Attendance: 40,000; Referee: (Portugal) António Palhinhas |

| 12 April 1942 Friendly | Germany | 1–1 | Spain | (Germany) Olympiastadion, Berlin |
| 18:00 (UTC+2:00) | Campos 76' (pen.) | Report | 58' Decker | Attendance: 80,000; Referee: (Italy) Rinaldo Barlassina |

| 19 April 1942 Friendly | Italy | 4–0 | Spain | (Italy) San Siro, Milan |
| 15:30 (UTC+2:00) | Mazzola 47'; Ferraris 49'; Piola 87'; Loik 88' | Report | | Attendance: 55,000; Referee: (Germany) Peco Bauwens |

| 11 March 1945 Friendly | Portugal | 2–2 | Spain | (Portugal) Jamor, Oeiras |
| | Peyroteo 70', 75' | Report | 20' César; 58' Epi | Attendance: 55,000; Referee: (Switzerland) Eugen Scherz |

| 6 May 1945 Friendly | Spain | 4–2 | Portugal | (Spain) Estadio Riazor, La Coruña |
| 17:00 (UTC+2:00) | Zarra 38', 41'; Herrerita 70'; César 76' (pen.) | Report | 10', 87' Peyroteo | Attendance: 43,000; Referee: (Switzerland) Eugen Scherz |

| 23 June 1946 Friendly | Spain | 0–1 | Republic of Ireland | (Spain) Nuevo Estadio Chamartín, Madrid |
| 18:30 (UTC+2:00) | | Report | 38' Sloan | Attendance: 45,000; Referee: (Switzerland) Paul von Wartburg |

| 26 January 1947 Friendly | Portugal | 4–1 | Spain | (Portugal) Jamor, Oeiras |
| 15:00 (UTC+0:00) | Araújo 15', 32'; Travaços 60', 88' | Report | 2' Iriondo | Attendance: 68,000; Referee: (England) Jim Wiltshire |

| 2 March 1947 Friendly | Republic of Ireland | 3–2 | Spain | (Republic of Ireland) Dalymount Park, Dublin |
| 15:30 (UTC+0:00) | Walsh 16', 79'; Coad 23' | Report | 25', 59' Zarra | Attendance: 42,012; Referee: (England) Jack Barrick |

| 21 March 1948 Friendly | Spain | 2–0 | Portugal | (Spain) Nuevo Estadio Chamartín, Madrid |
| 17:00 (UTC+1:00) | César 32'; Gaínza 48' (pen.) | Report | | Attendance: 80,000; Referee: (England) Bill Evans |

| 30 May 1948 Friendly | Spain | 2–1 | Republic of Ireland | (Spain) Montjuïc, Barcelona |
| 17:30 (UTC+1:00) | Igoa 35', 72' | Report | 24' Moroney | Attendance: 70,000; Referee: (France) Victor Sdez |

| 20 June 1948 Friendly | Switzerland | 3–3 | Spain | (Switzerland) Hardturm, Zürich |
| 15:00 (UTC+1:00) | Curta 14' (o.g.); Friedländer 60'; Antenen 71' | Report | 7' Pahiño; 10', 67' Igoa | Attendance: 22,000; Referee: (France) Victor Sdez |

| 2 January 1949 Friendly | Spain | 1–1 | Belgium | (Spain) Montjuïc, Barcelona |
| 15:30 (UTC+1:00) | Silva 28' | Report | 63' Coppens | Attendance: 62,000; Referee: (Italy) Generoso Dattilo |

| 20 March 1949 Friendly | Portugal | 1–1 | Spain | (Portugal) Jamor, Oeiras |
| 16:00 (UTC+0:00) | Peyroteo 57' | Report | 47' Zarra | Attendance: 54,000; Referee: (France) Charles Delasalle |

| 27 March 1949 Friendly | Spain | 1–3 | Italy | (Spain) Nuevo Estadio Chamartín, Madrid |
| 16:30 (UTC+1:00) | Gaínza 34' (pen.) | Report | 9' Lorenzi; 48' Carapellese; 50' Amadei | Attendance: 80,000; Referee: (England) William Ling |

| 12 June 1949 Friendly | Republic of Ireland | 1–4 | Spain | (Republic of Ireland) Dalymount Park, Dublin |
| 15:30 (UTC+1:00) | Martin 14' (pen.) | Report | 29', 32' Zarra; 34' Basora; 85' Igoa | Attendance: 30,171; Referee: (England) Arthur Ellis |

| 19 June 1949 Friendly | France | 1–5 | Spain | (France) Yves-du-Manoir, Colombes |
| 15:00 (UTC+1:00) | Baratte 64' (pen.) | Report | 15', 20', 26' Basora; 65', 84' (pen.) Gaínza | Attendance: 52,217; Referee: (Italy) Giacomo Bertolio |

== 1950s ==
| 2 April 1950 (Brazil) 1950 World Cup qualifying | Spain | 5–1 | Portugal | (Spain) Nuevo Estadio Chamartín, Madrid |
| 17:00 (UTC+1:00) | Zarra 11', 58'; Basora 13'; Panizo 14'; Molowny 65' | Report | Cabrita 36' | Attendance: 80,000; Referee: (England) Reg Leafe |

| 9 April 1950 (Brazil) 1950 World Cup qualifying | Portugal | 2–2 | Spain | (Portugal) Jamor, Oeiras |
| 16:30 (UTC+0:00) | Travaços 55'; Correia 59' | Report | 23' Zarra; 83' Gaínza | Attendance: 30,000; Referee: (Scotland) Jack Mowat |

| 25 June 1950 (Brazil) 1950 World Cup group stage | Spain | 3–1 | United States | (Brazil) Durival de Britto, Curitiba |
| 20:00 CEST | Igoa 81'; Basora 83'; Zarra 89' | Report | Souza 17' | Attendance: 9,000; Referee: (Brazil) Mario Vianna |

| 29 June 1950 (Brazil) 1950 World Cup group stage | Spain | 2–0 | Chile | (Brazil) Maracanã, Rio de Janeiro |
| 20:00 CEST | Basora 17'; Zarra 33' | Report | | Attendance: 20,000; Referee: (Brazil) Alberto Malcher |

| 2 July 1950 (Brazil) 1950 World Cup group stage | Spain | 1–0 | England | (Brazil) Maracanã, Rio de Janeiro |
| 20:00 CEST | Zarra 49' | Report | | Attendance: 74,000; Referee: (Italy) Giovanni Galeati |

| 9 July 1950 (Brazil) 1950 World Cup final round | Uruguay | 2–2 | Spain | (Brazil) Pacaembu, São Paulo |
| 20:00 CEST | Ghiggia 29'; Varela 73' | Report | Basora 37', 39' | Attendance: 44,000; Referee: (Wales) Benjamin Griffiths |

| 13 July 1950 (Brazil) 1950 World Cup final round | Brazil | 6–1 | Spain | (Brazil) Maracanã, Rio de Janeiro |
| 20:00 CEST | Parra 16' (o.g.); Ademir 20'; Chico 31', 55'; Jair 57'; Zizinho 67' | Report | Igoa 73' | Attendance: 152,000; Referee: (England) Reginald Leafe |

| 16 July 1950 (Brazil) 1950 World Cup final round | Sweden | 3–1 | Spain | (Brazil) Pacaembu, São Paulo |
| 20:00 CEST | Sundqvist 15'; Mellberg 34'; Palmér 78' | Report | Zarra 83' | Attendance: 11,000; Referee: (Netherlands) Karel van der Meer |

| 18 February 1951 Friendly | Spain | 6–3 | Switzerland | (Spain) Nuevo Estadio Chamartín, Madrid |
| 16:00 (UTC+1:00) | Zarra 12', 35', 50', 65'; Gaínza 52'; César 83' | Report | Bickel 38', 89'; Friedländer 68' | Attendance: 80,000; Referee: Reg Leafe (England) |

| 10 June 1951 Friendly | Belgium | 3–3 | Spain | (Belgium) Heizelstadion, Brussels |
| 16:00 (UTC+1:00) | Van Gestel 1', 85'; Van Steelant 57' | Report | Gonzalvo 28'; Zarra 47', 71' | Attendance: 25,367; Referee: Agostino Gamba (Italy) |

| 17 June 1951 Friendly | Sweden | 0–0 | Spain | (Sweden) Råsunda, Solna |
| 14:00 (UTC+1:00) | | Report | | Attendance: 26,729; Referee: Giorgio Bernardi (Italy) |

| 1 June 1952 Friendly | Spain | 6–0 | Republic of Ireland | (Spain) Nuevo Estadio Chamartín, Madrid |
| 18:00 (UTC+1:00) | Coque 2'; Gaínza 10'; César 14'; Basora 43', 69'; Panizo 52' | Report | | Attendance: 75,000; Referee: Reg Leafe (England) |

| 8 June 1952 Friendly | Turkey | 0–0 | Spain | (Turkey) Mithat Paşa, Istanbul |
| 17:00 (UTC+2:00) | | Report | | Attendance: 30,000; Referee: Giuseppe Carpani (Italy) |

| 7 December 1952 Friendly | Spain | 0–1 | Argentina | (Spain) Nuevo Estadio Chamartín, Madrid |
| 15:30 (UTC+1:00) | | Report | Infante 59' | Attendance: 72,000; Referee: Arthur Ellis (England) |

| 28 December 1952 Friendly | Spain | 2–2 | West Germany | (Spain) Nuevo Estadio Chamartín, Madrid |
| 15:30 (UTC+1:00) | Gaínza 25'; César 69' (pen.) | Report | Walter 43', 69'; Termath 30' | Attendance: 80,000; Referee: Vincenzo Orlandini (Italy) |

| 19 March 1953 Friendly | Spain | 3–1 | Belgium | (Spain) Les Corts, Barcelona |
| 16:30 (UTC+1:00) | Venancio 25'; Marcet 67', 82' | Report | Lemberechts 84' | Attendance: 50,000; Referee: Joaquim Reis e Santos (Portugal) |

| 5 July 1953 Friendly | Argentina | 1–0 | Spain | (Argentina) Monumental, Buenos Aires |
| 15:00 (UTC-3:00) | Grillo 86' | Report | | Attendance: 100,000; Referee: Arthur Luty (England) |

| 12 July 1953 Friendly | Chile | 1–2 | Spain | (Chile) Nacional Julio Martínez Prádanos, Ñuñoa |
| 15:00 (UTC-4:00) | Muñoz 84' | Report | Venancio 10'; Kubala 33' | Attendance: 54,877; Referee: Ralph Tarratt (England) |

| 8 November 1953 Friendly | Spain | 2–2 | Sweden | (Spain) San Mamés, Bilbao |
| 16:00 (UTC+1:00) | Venancio 12'; Molowny 62' | Report | Eriksson 16'; Jacobsson 23' | Attendance: 45,000; Referee: Raymond Vincenti (France) |

| 6 January 1954 (Switzerland) 1954 World Cup qualifying | Spain | 4–1 | Turkey | (Spain) Nuevo Estadio Chamartín, Madrid |
| 15:30 (+1:00) | Venancio 12'; Gaínza 47'; Miguel 49'; Alsua 65' | Report | Recep 31' | Attendance: 110,000; Referee: Raymond Vincenti (France) |

| 14 March 1954 (Switzerland) 1954 World Cup qualifying | Turkey | 1–0 | Spain | (Turkey) Mithat Paşa, Istanbul |
| 15:00 (UTC+2:00) | Burhan 15' | Report | | Attendance: 25,449; Referee: Emil Schmetzer (West Germany) |

| 17 March 1954 (Switzerland) 1954 World Cup qualifying play-off | Turkey | 2 – 2 (a.e.t.); TUR won after toss of a coin | Spain | (Italy) Olimpico, Rome |
| 15:30 (UTC+1:00) | Burhan 32'; Suat 65' | Report | Artetxe 18'; Escudero 79' | Attendance: 60,000; Referee: Giorgio Bernardi (Italy) |

| 17 March 1955 Friendly | Spain | 1–2 | France | (Spain) Santiago Bernabéu, Madrid |
| 16:30 (UTC+1:00) | Gaínza 11' | Report | Kopa 35'; Vincent 73' | Attendance: 125,000; Referee: Vincenzo Orlandini (Italy) |

| 18 May 1955 Friendly | Spain | 1–1 | England | (Spain) Santiago Bernabéu, Madrid |
| 17:30 (UTC+1:00) | Rial 65' | Report | Bentley 38' | Attendance: 125,000; Referee: Riccardo Pieri (Italy) |

| 19 June 1955 Friendly | Switzerland | 0–3 | Spain | (Switzerland) Charmilles, Geneva |
| 17:00 (UTC+1:00) | | Report | Collar 2'; Arieta 54'; Maguregui 89' | Attendance: 25,500; Referee: Giorgio Bernardi (Italy) |

| 27 November 1955 Friendly | Republic of Ireland | 2–2 | Spain | (Republic of Ireland) Dalymount Park, Dublin |
| 15:30 (UTC+0:00) | Fitzsimons 8'; Ringstead 76' | Report | Pahiño 24', 44' | Attendance: 35,000; Referee: Arthur Ellis (England) |

| 30 November 1955 Friendly | England | 4–1 | Spain | (England) Wembley, London |
| 14:00 (UTC+0:00) | Atyeo 12'; Perry 13', 60'; Finney 59' | Report | Arieta 80' | Attendance: 95,550; Referee: Maurice Guigue (France) |

| 3 June 1956 Friendly | Portugal | 3–1 | Spain | (Portugal) Jamor, Oeiras |
| 17:00 (UTC+1:00) | Palmeiro (8) | Report | Peiró (42) | Attendance: 75,000; Referee: Jacques Devillers (France) |

| 30 January 1957 Friendly | Spain | 5–1 | Netherlands | (Spain) Santiago Bernabéu, Madrid |
| 16:00 (UTC+1:00) | Garay 14'; Di Stéfano 46', 70', 89'; Kubala 54' | Report | Bosselaar 76' (pen.) | Attendance: 90,000; Referee: Reg Leafe (England) |

| 10 March 1957 (Sweden) 1958 World Cup qualifying | Spain | 2–2 | Switzerland | (Spain) Santiago Bernabéu, Madrid |
| 16:30 (UTC+1:00) | Suárez 29'; Miguel 48' | Report | Hügi 6', 67' | Attendance: 120,000; Referee: Erich Asmussen (West Germany) |

| 31 March 1957 Friendly | Belgium | 0–5 | Spain | (Belgium) Heizelstadion, Brussels |
| 15:00 (UTC+1:00) | | Report | Di Stéfano 25', 71'; Suárez 27', 75'; Mateos 29' | Attendance: 54,719; Referee: Sepp Gulde (Switzerland) |

| 8 May 1957 (Sweden) 1958 World Cup qualifying | Scotland | 4–2 | Spain | (Scotland) Hampden Park, Glasgow |
| 18:45 (UTC+1:00) | Mudie 20', 70', 79'; Hewie 41' (pen.) | Report | Kubala 29'; Suárez 50' | Attendance: 88,980; Referee: Albert Dusch (West Germany) |

| 26 May 1957 (Sweden) 1958 World Cup qualifying | Spain | 4–1 | Scotland | (Spain) Santiago Bernabéu, Madrid |
| 17:30 (UTC+1:00) | Mateos 12'; Kubala 32'; Basora 57', 89' | Report | Smith 78' | Attendance: 90,000; Referee: Reg Leafe (England) |

| 6 November 1957 Friendly | Spain | 3–0 | Turkey | (Spain) Santiago Bernabéu, Madrid |
| 16:00 (UTC+1:00) | Kubala 18', 38' (pen.), 80' | Report | | Attendance: 23,578; Referee: Francisco Guerra (Portugal) |

| 24 November 1957 (Sweden) 1958 World Cup qualifying | Switzerland | 1–4 | Spain | (Switzerland) La Pontaise, Lausanne |
| 14:30 (UTC+1:00) | Ballaman 60' | Report | Kubala 18', 72'; Di Stéfano 23', 56' | Attendance: 43,5000; Referee: Albert Alsteen (Belgium) |

| 13 March 1958 Friendly | France | 2–2 | Spain | (France) Parc des Princes, Paris |
| 15:00 (UTC+1:00) | Fontaine 49'; Piantoni 65' | Report | Kubala 15'; Collar 58' | Attendance: 37,983; Referee: Jack Clough (England) |

| 19 March 1958 Friendly | West Germany | 2–0 | Spain | (West Germany) Waldstadion, Frankfurt |
| 16:00 (UTC+1:00) | Klodt 45'; Cieslarczyk 47' | Report | | Attendance: 81,000; Referee: Arthur Ellis (England) |

| 13 April 1958 Friendly | Spain | 1–0 | Portugal | (Spain) Santiago Bernabéu, Madrid |
| 17:00 (UTC+1:00) | Di Stéfano 85' | Report | | Attendance: 80,000; Referee: Marcel Lequesne (France) |

| 15 October 1958 Friendly | Spain | 6–2 | Northern Ireland | (Spain) Santiago Bernabéu, Madrid |
| 20:15 (UTC+1:00) | Tejada 3', 47', 78', 87'; Kubala 11'; Suárez 58' | Report | Cush 50'; McIlroy 77' | Attendance: 120,000; Referee: Joaquim Campos (Portugal) |

| 28 February 1959 Friendly | Italy | 1–1 | Spain | (Italy) Olimpico, Rome |
| 15:30 (UTC+1:00) | Lojacono 84' | Report | Di Stéfano 68' | Attendance: 65,000; Referee: Friedrich Seipelt (Austria) |

| 28 June 1959 (France) 1960 EURO qualifying | Poland | 2–4 | Spain | (Poland) Śląski, Chorzów |
| 17:30 (UTC+2:00) | Pol 34'; Brychczy 62' | Report | Suárez 41', 51'; Di Stéfano 43', 55' | Attendance: 71,469; Referee: Arthur Ellis (England) |

| 14 October 1959 (France) 1960 EURO qualifying | Spain | 3–0 | Poland | (Spain) Santiago Bernabéu, Madrid |
| 20:30 (UTC+1:00) | Di Stéfano 29'; Gensana 69'; Gento 86' | Report | | Attendance: 62,070; Referee: Karoly Balla (Hungary) |

| November 1959 (France) 1960 EURO qualifying | Soviet Union | Cancelled | Spain | (Soviet Union) Moscow |

| 22 November 1959 Friendly | Spain | 6–3 | Austria | (Spain) Mestalla, Valencia |
| 15:30 (UTC+1:00) | Di Stéfano 10', 63'; Suárez 14', 27' (pen.); Martínez 50'; Mateos 79' | Report | Hof 40'; Senekowitsch 56'; Knoll 86' | Attendance: 60,000; Referee: Pierre Schwinte (France) |

| December 1959 (France) 1960 EURO qualifying | Spain | 0 – 3 (UEFA decision) | Soviet Union | Not played |

| 17 December 1959 Friendly | France | 4–3 | Spain | (France) Parc des Princes, Paris |
| 14:30 (UTC+1:00) | Muller 25'; Fontaine 32'; Vincent 37'; Marche 61' | Report | Suárez 21'; Martínez 80'; Vergés 88' | Attendance: 38,622; Referee: Reg Leafe (England) |

== See also ==
- Spain national football team results
- Spain national football team results (1920–1939)
- Spain national football team results (1960–1979)
