= Nando Santos =

Spanish singer and teacher (born 1977)

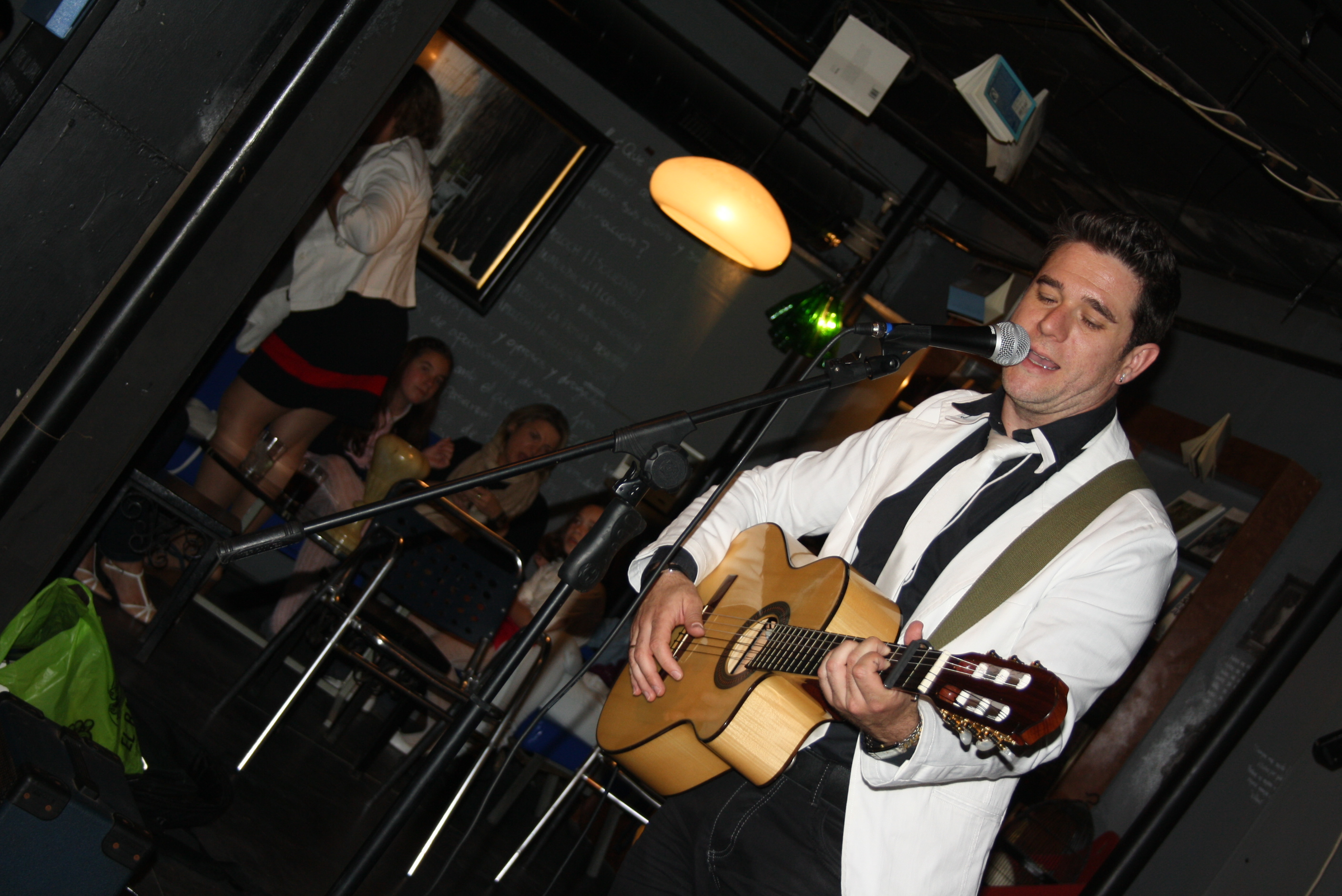
- Nando Santos on stage, 2013

Background information
- Also known as: Nando Santos
- Born: Fernando de los Santos Rodríguez Collado; 1 November 1977 (age 48); La Puebla de Cazalla, Spain
- Genres: Latin pop, pop, Flamenco
- Occupations: Musician, singer, songwriter
- Instruments: Vocals, guitar
- Years active: 2008-present
- Label: Kronborg records
- Website: nandosantos.com

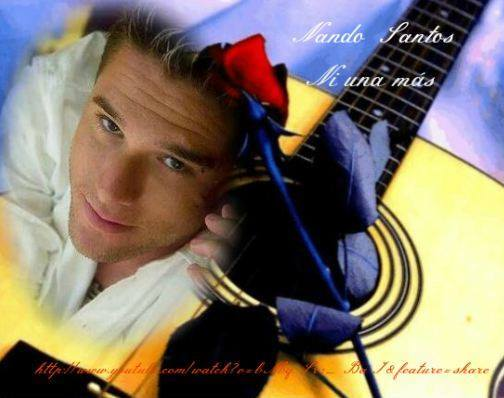
Nando Santos in 2009

Nando Santos (1 November 1977) is a Spanish singer and teacher born in La Puebla de Cazalla, Seville.

== Biography ==
From a young age, Santos began composing and performing in hotels and became part of several amateur duos and trios.

Between 2003 and 2006, he tried his hand at producing several demos recorded in Madrid to Talavera de la Reina by the producer Borja Martın, current vocalist of 'Idolos de polvo.'

In 2008 he signed his first professional contract with record label Kronborg Records.

Nando began his recording career in 2009 with his LP DE CORAZÓN and rose to fame through the program GENTE of TVE.

With their first album, he managed to carve a niche in the music scene, even getting into the top 40, and performed concerts throughout Spain.

In November 2013 he made his first international concert in Tilff, Belgium.

Santos holds a degree in French philology and combines music with teaching. He is the composer of the hymn College Vinaròs Jaume I (Castellón), entitled 'Enseñar y aprender' (Teaching and Learning).

Besides music he is dedicated to give talks and lectures at high schools about the music and human values.

Nando is an artist who has worked in many charity projects such as Manos Unidas, FADAM (childhood cancer), Mi mano es tu apoyo (GBV), Partnership against AIDS...

He has shared the stage with important artists such as José el francés, Los chunguitos, Las supremas de Móstoles, Vicente Segui, Arévalo, Joan Rovira, Deduende...

In 2014 he released a new album titled "Va por ti." With this title, Nando honors his mother, who died shortly before the release of the album. During 2014 and 2015, Nando presented this new work in different places in Spain and offered his first international concert in Tilff (Belgium).

After a small break, citing personal reasons, Nando Santos prepares a new musical project that will see the light in 2017 titled "VersioNANDO". It is a repertoire of versions to which Nando will give them their own personal touch.

== Discography ==
- 'De corazón' 2009

This album was produced by Javier Losada and Carlos Lopez for Kronborg records label. Javier Losada is considered one of the best producers in Spain. Losada has worked, among others, with artists such as Alejandro Sanz, Ricky Martin, Manuel Carrasco, Alex Ubago, Innocence or Celia Cruz.

- 'Va por ti' 2014

This album was produced by Nando Santos and Antonio J. Henares for SGAE.

=== Singles and videoclips ===
- 'Completamente enamorados' 2008
- 'De ti me enamoré' 2009
- 'Que te vaya bien' 2010
- 'Mi lema es amarte' 2011
- 'Ni una más' 2013
- 'Siete' 2014
