= José María de la Concha =

Spanish player, manager, and sports leader (1915–2005)

Personal information
- Full name: José María de la Concha Meneses
- Date of birth: 11 November 1915
- Place of birth: Buenos Aires, Argentina
- Date of death: 28 April 2005 (aged 89)
- Place of death: Cazalla de la Sierra, Spain

Youth career
- 1929–1930: Real Betis (youth)

Senior career*
Years	Team	Apps	(Gls)
1930–1932	CD Céspedes		
1932–1934	Calavera		
1934–1936	Real Betis		

Managerial career
- 1960–1961: Calavera
- 1961–1962: Betis Deportivo
President of Calavera
In office
1942–1949
- * Club domestic league appearances and goals

José María de la Concha Meneses (11 November 1915 – 28 April 2005) was a Spanish sports leader who is regarded as one of the most important figures in the history of Real Betis, being a member of the club for nearly eight decades, from the late 1920s until he died in 2005, holding several positions at the club, such as player, manager, director, designer of the club's current crest, and even technical secretary under Benito Villamarín.

== Early life ==
Born on 11 November 1915 in Buenos Aires, De la Concha was seven years old when his family settled at La Puebla de Cazalla in 1922, before work reasons caused them to move again, this time to Seville in 1928.

== Sporting career ==
Despite having signed up as a youth member of Betis in 1929, De la Concha began playing football at CD Céspedes in 1930, aged 14, where he stayed for two years, until 1932, when he joined Calavera, the third oldest team in Seville. Two years later, in 1934, he returned to Betis, now as a non-professional player, thus being a member of the staff that won the 1934–35 La Liga, the club's first (and only) league title. In 1940, the 24-year-old De la Concha became one of the club's directors, and in 1942, he became the president of his former club Calavera, a position that he held for seven years, until 1949.

Having earned his coaching certification in 1950, De la Concha was part of the committee that created the Coaches' Association in 1951, and was later appointed technical secretary of Córdoba CF in 1953. The following year, in 1954, he returned to Betis as a member of the coaching staff, remaining there for six years, until 1960, when he became the manager of Calavera, a position that he held for the 1960–61 season, after which he took over the lower ranks of Real Betis in the 1961–62 season. He then served as Betis' technical secretary for three seasons, from 1962 until 1965, later performing the same role at Atlético Madrid for three seasons, from 1965 until 1968, and at Calvo Sotelo Puertollano in the 1968–69 season. During his stint at Atlético, on 21 June 1966, De la Concha attended a friendly between Atlético and the Brazilian national team, who was on their way to England for the 1966 FIFA World Cup. Due to his frequent trips as a scout to Brazil, he was close with some members of the Brazilian technical staff, which allowed him to get the number 10 shirt of the team's star player, Pelé. A few weeks later, he was spotted wearing that shirt at the Cádiz beach by José María Valera Pérez, the son of Real Betis coach Pepe Valera, who besieged and bored De la Concha for weeks until he got it.

In 1957, De la Concha designed a new crest for the club and presented it to president Benito Villamarín, who accepted it as the club's official crest. His second stint as technical secretary of Betis lasted two years, from 1969 until 1971. He was rewarded for both feats, receiving the Betis Silver Medal in 1957 and the Betis Club's Golden Shield in 1971, as well as the Gold Medal for Merit in Sports Work from the Andalusian Football Federation. After a brief stint as the technical secretary of Real Madrid, he returned to Betis in 1973, now as the head of the technical organization, a position that he held for five years, until 1978. Under his leadership, the Betis team that he had built player by player won the 1976–77 Copa del Rey title, beating Athletic Bilbao on a penalties in the final.

In the 1983–84 season, De la Concha served as president of the Real Betis electoral board, and in 1998–90, he was a director under president Hugo Galera. Outside football, he was also a member of both the Gypsy Brotherhood and the Spanish Skating Federation and presided over the Seville Skating Federation.

== Death ==
De la Concha died in Seville on 28 April 2005, at the age of 89; at the time of his death, he was Betis' number one member. A few days later, on 7 May, the Heliópolis stadium observed a minute of silence in his memory before the Seville derby, which was won by Betis, who went on to win the 2005 Copa del Rey final.
