= Spain national football team results (1990–1999) =

These are all the matches played by the Spain national football team between 1990 and 1999:

== Meaning ==
	Meaning
S.O.	Summer Olympics
W.C.	FIFA World Cup
EURO	UEFA European Championship
CC	FIFA Confederations Cup
TB	Tie-break match
Q	Qualification rounds
R + number	Round number
FR	Final round
GS	Group stage
1/32	Round of 32
1/16	Round of 16
QF	Quarter-final
SF	Semi-final
F	Final
RP	Repechage
Rep.	Replay match
3rd–4th	Third place match

== Results ==
98 matches played:

=== 1990 ===
21 February Friendly	Spain	1–0	Czechoslovakia	(Spain) Rico Pérez, Alicante
	Manolo 42'			Attendance: 34,000; Referee: (Switzerland) Freddy Philippoz

28 March Friendly	Spain	2–3	Austria	(Spain) La Rosaleda, Málaga
	Manolo 2'; Butragueño 33'		47' Hörtnagl; 65' Toni; 89' Rodax	Attendance: 15,000; Referee: (Italy) Pietro D`Elia

26 May Friendly	Yugoslavia	0–1	Spain	(Socialist Federal Republic of Yugoslavia) Ljubljana
			55' Butragueño	Attendance: 10,000; Referee: (Italy) Rosario Lo Bello

13 June (Italy) 1990 W.C. GS	Uruguay	0–0	Spain	(Italy) Friuli, Udine
17:00 CEST				Attendance: 35,713; Referee: (Austria) Helmut Kohl

17 June (Italy) 1990 W.C. GS	South Korea	1–3	Spain	(Italy) Friuli, Udine
21:00 CEST	Kwan 42'		23', 61', 81' Míchel	Attendance: 32,733; Referee: (Ecuador) Elías Jácome

21 June (Italy) 1990 W.C. GS	Belgium	1–2	Spain	(Italy) Marc'Antonio Bentegodi, Verona
17:00 CEST	Vervoort 30'		25' (pen.) Míchel; 38' Górriz	Attendance: 35,950; Referee: (Argentina) Juan Carlos Loustau

26 June (Italy) 1990 W.C. 1/8	Spain	1–2 (a.e.t.)	Yugoslavia	(Italy) Marc'Antonio Bentegodi, Verona
17:00 CEST	Salinas 84'		78', 93' Stojković	Attendance: 35,500; Referee: (West Germany) Aron Schmidhuber

12 September Friendly	Spain	3–0	Brazil	(Spain) El Molinón, Gijón, Asturias
	Carlos 9'; Fernando 63'; Michel 89'			Attendance: 42,000; Referee: (Italy) Pietro D`Elia

10 October (Sweden) 1992 EURO Q	Spain	2–1	Iceland	(Spain) Benito Villamarín, Seville
20:45 CEST	Butragueño 44'; Carlos 63'		66' Jónsson	Attendance: 18,399; Referee: (Malta) Victor Mintoff

14 November (Sweden) 1992 EURO Q	Czechoslovakia	3–2	Spain	(Czechoslovakia) Evžena Rošického, Prague
18:00 CET	Daněk 16', 66'; Moravčík 78'		30' Roberto; 53' Carlos	Attendance: 21,980; Referee: (West Germany) Karl-Heinz Tritschler

19 December (Sweden) 1992 EURO Q	Spain	9–0	Albania	(Spain) Ramón Sánchez Pizjuán, Seville
20:30 CET	Amor 19'; Carlos 23', 65'; Butragueño 30', 57', 67', 76'; Hierro 36'; Bakero 86'			Attendance: 12,625; Referee: (Belgium) Alphonse Costantin

=== 1991 ===
16 January Friendly	Spain	1–1	Portugal	(Spain) Castalia, Castellón
20:30	Moya 71'		40' Oceano	Attendance: 12,300; Referee: (Italy) Arcangele Pezzella

20 February (Sweden) 1992 EURO Q	France	3–1	Spain	(France) Parc des Princes, Paris
20:45 CET	Sauzée 14'; Papin 58'; Blanc 77'		10' Bakero	Attendance: 45,000; Referee: (Italy) Tullio Lanese

27 March Friendly	Spain	2–4	Hungary	(Spain) El Sardinero, Santander
22:00	Manolo 44' (pen.); Carlos 84'		42', 59' Kiprich; 53', 89' Emil Lőrincz	Attendance: 21,000; Referee: (Switzerland) Arturo Martino

17 April Friendly	Spain	0–2	Romania	(Spain) Príncipe Felipe, Cáceres
21:00			46' Timofte; 57' Balint	Attendance: 16,000; Referee: (Portugal) João Martins Correia Pinto

4 September Friendly	Spain	2–1	Uruguay	(Spain) Antiguo Carlos Tartiere, Oviedo
21:15	Vázquez 8'; Manolo 18'		66' Gutiérrez	Attendance: 8,000; Referee: (Netherlands) Jaap Uilenberg

25 September (Sweden) 1992 EURO Q	Iceland	2–0	Spain	(Iceland) Laugardalsvöllur, Reykjavík
18:15 CEST	Örlygsson 71'; Sverrisson 79'			Attendance: 8,900; Referee: (Netherlands) Cornelius Bakker

12 October (Sweden) 1992 EURO Q	Spain	1–2	France	(Spain) Benito Villamarín, Seville
20:30 CEST	Abelardo 33'		12' Fernández; 15' Papin	Attendance: 27,500; Referee: (Austria) Hubert Forstinger

13 November (Sweden) 1992 EURO Q	Spain	2–1	Czechoslovakia	(Spain) Ramón Sánchez Pizjuán, Seville
20:30 CET	Abelardo 10'; Míchel 78' (pen.)		59' Němeček	Attendance: 24,500; Referee: (Switzerland) Kurt Röthlisberger

18 December (Sweden) 1992 EURO Q	Albania	Cancelled	Spain	(Albania) Qemal Stafa, Tirana
14:00 CET				Attendance: Not played Referee: (Luxembourg) Roger Philippi

=== 1992 ===
15 January Friendly	Portugal	0–0	Spain	(Portugal) J. A. Vieira, Torres Novas
				Attendance: 11,000; Referee: (France) Antoine De Pandis

19 February Friendly	Spain	1–1	CIS	(Spain) Luis Casanova, Valencia
	Hierro 86'		73' Kiriakov	Attendance: 7,000; Referee: (France) Philippe Leduc

11 March Friendly	Spain	2–0	United States	(Spain) Nuevo José Zorrilla, Valladolid
	Begiristain 40'; Hierro 75'			Attendance: 15,000; Referee: (Portugal) José Rosa dos Santos

22 April (United States) 1994 W.C. Q	Spain	3–0	Albania	(Spain) Benito Villamarín, Seville
	Míchel 2', 65' (pen.); Hierro 87'			Attendance: 10,000; Referee: (Switzerland) Serge Muhmenthaler

9 September Friendly	Spain	1–0	England	(Spain) El Sardinero, Santander
	Fonseca 11'			Attendance: 22,000; Referee: (Portugal) Paulo Trigo Veiga

23 September (United States) 1994 W.C. Q	Latvia	0–0	Spain	(Latvia) Daugava, Riga
				Attendance: 6,220; Referee: (Luxembourg) Roger Philippi

14 October (United States) 1994 W.C. Q	Northern Ireland	0–0	Spain	(Northern Ireland) Windsor Park, Belfast
				Attendance: 10,343; Referee: (Germany) Hellmut Krug

18 November (United States) 1994 W.C. Q	Spain	0–0	Republic of Ireland	(Spain) Ramón Sánchez Pizjuán, Seville
				Attendance: 52,000; Referee: (Belgium) Alphonse Constantin

16 December (United States) 1994 W.C. Q	Spain	5–0	Latvia	(Spain) Ramón Sánchez Pizjuán, Seville
	Bakero 48'; Guardiola 50'; Alfonso 79'; Begiristain 81', 83'			Attendance: 19,000; Referee: (Romania) Ion Crăciunescu

=== 1993 ===
27 January Friendly	Spain	1–1	Mexico	(Spain) Insular, Las Palmas G.C., Canary Islands
	Toni 71' (pen.)		45' Suárez	Attendance: 21,000; Referee: (Switzerland) Kurt Röthlisberger

24 February (United States) 1994 W.C. Q	Spain	5–0	Lithuania	(Spain) Benito Villamarín, Seville
	Cristóbal 5'; Bakero 13'; Begiristain 17'; Thomas Christiansen 86'; Aldana 90'			Attendance: 21,000; Referee: (Malta) Alfred Micaleff

31 March (United States) 1994 W.C. Q	Denmark	1–0	Spain	(Denmark) Parken, Copenhagen
	Povlsen 20'			Attendance: 40,272; Referee: (Netherlands) Mario Van der Ende

28 April (United States) 1994 W.C. Q	Spain	3–1	Northern Ireland	(Spain) Benito Villamarín, Seville
	Salinas 21', 26'; Hierro 41'		11' Kevin Wilson	Attendance: 20,000; Referee: (Sweden) Leif Sundell

2 June (United States) 1994 W.C. Q	Lithuania	0–2	Spain	(Lithuania) Žalgiris, Vilnius
			72', 75' Guerrero	Attendance: 4,500; Referee: (Romania) George Ionescu

8 September Friendly	Spain	2–0	Chile	(Spain) Rico Pérez, Alicante
	Guerrero 61', 89' (pen.)			Attendance: 35,000; Referee: (Portugal) Vítor Melo Pereira

22 September (United States) 1994 W.C. Q	Albania	1–5	Spain	(Albania) Qemal Stafa, Tirana
	Kushta 40'		4', 30', 61' Salinas; 19' Toni; 67' Caminero	Attendance: 3,000; Referee: (France) Rémy Harrel

13 October (United States) 1994 W.C. Q	Republic of Ireland	1–3	Spain	(Republic of Ireland) Lansdowne Road, Dublin
	Sheridan 72'		12' Caminero; 19', 26' Salinas	Attendance: 33,000; Referee: (Italy) Fabio Baldas

17 November (United States) 1994 W.C. Q	Spain	1–0	Denmark	(Spain) Ramón Sánchez Pizjuán, Seville
	Hierro 63'			Attendance: 38,000; Referee: (Greece) Vassilios Nikakis

=== 1994 ===
19 January Friendly	Spain	2–2	Portugal	(Spain) Balaídos, Vigo, Pontevedra
	Salinas 42'; Juanele 66'		62' (o.g.) López; 83' (pen.) Oceano	Attendance: 32,000; Referee: (Italy) Fabio Baldas

9 February Friendly	Spain	1–1	Poland	(Spain) H. Rodríguez López, Tenerife, Canary Islands
	Sergi 19'		38' Kosecki	Attendance: 20,000; Referee: (England) Martin Bodenham

23 March Friendly	Spain	0–2	Croatia	(Spain) Luis Casanova, Valencia
			6' Prosinečki; 51' Šuker	Attendance: 40,000; Referee: (France) Gilles Veissière

2 June Friendly	Finland	1–2	Spain	(Finland) Ratina, Tampere
	Järvinen 17'		11' Miñambres; 15' Salinas	Attendance: 10,251; Referee: (Sweden) Christer Fällström

10 June Friendly	Canada	0–2	Spain	(Canada) Claude-Robillard, Montreal
			9' Salinas; 85' Juanele	Attendance: 5,256; Referee: (England) Mike Reed

18 June (United States) 1994 W.C. GS	Spain	2–2	South Korea	(United States) Cotton Bowl, Dallas
01:35 CEST	Salinas 50'; Goikoetxea 55'		84' Hong Myung-bo; 90' Seo Jung-won	Attendance: 56,247; Referee: (Denmark) Peter Mikkelsen

21 June (United States) 1994 W.C. GS	Germany	1–1	Spain	(United States) Soldier Field, Chicago
22:05 CEST	Klinsmann 48'		14' Goikoetxea	Attendance: 63,113; Referee: (Uruguay) Filippi Cavani

27 June (United States) 1994 W.C. GS	Bolivia	1–3	Spain	(United States) Soldier Field, Chicago
22:05 CEST	Sánchez 66'		19' (pen.) Guardiola; 65', 71' Caminero	Attendance: 63,089; Referee: (Costa Rica) Rodrigo Badilla

2 July (United States) 1994 W.C. 1/8	Spain	3–0	Switzerland	(United States) RFK Memorial, Washington
23:35 CEST	Hierro 14'; Luis Enrique 73'; Begiristain 86' (pen.)			Attendance: 53,121; Referee: (Netherlands) Mario van der Ende

9 July (United States) 1994 W.C. QF	Italy	2–1	Spain	(United States) Foxboro, Foxborough
19:05 CEST	D. Baggio 26'; R. Baggio 87'		59' Caminero	Attendance: 53,400; Referee: (Hungary) Sándor Puhl

7 September (England) 1996 EURO Q	Cyprus	1–2	Spain	(Cyprus) Tsirion, Limassol
	Sotiriou 37'		18', 25' Higuera	Attendance: 10,000; Referee: (France) Marc Batta

12 October (England) 1996 EURO Q	Macedonia	0–2	Spain	(North Macedonia) Skopje City, Skopje
			16', 25' Salinas	Attendance: 30,000; Referee: (Austria) Gerd Grabher

16 November (England) 1996 EURO Q	Spain	3–0	Denmark	(Spain) Ramón Sánchez Pizjuán, Seville
	Nadal 41'; Donato 56'; Luis Enrique 87'			Attendance: 26,428; Referee: (Scotland) Jim McCluskey

30 November Friendly	Spain	2–0	Finland	(Spain) La Rosaleda, Málaga
	Nadal 12'; Goikoetxea 87'			Attendance: 38,000; Referee: (England) David Elleray

17 December (England) 1996 EURO Q	Belgium	1–4	Spain	(Belgium) Constant Vanden Stock, Brussels
	Degryse 6'		29' Hierro; 56' (pen.) Donato; 69' Salinas; 89' Luis Enrique	Attendance: 15,074; Referee: (Turkey) Ahmet Çakar

=== 1995 ===
18 January Friendly	Spain	2–2	Uruguay	(Spain) Riazor, A Coruña
	Pizzi 1'; Donato 81'		18' Fonseca; 34' Bengoechea	Attendance: 22,000; Referee: (Bulgaria) Atanas Uzunov

22 February Friendly	Spain	0–0	Germany	(Spain) Chapín, Jerez de la Frontera, Cádiz
				Attendance: 19,000; Referee: (Sweden) Leif Sundell

29 March (England) 1996 EURO Q	Spain	1–1	Belgium	(Spain) Ramón Sánchez Pizjuán, Seville
	Higuera 24'		26' Degryse	Attendance: 27,000; Referee: (France) Rémy Harrel

26 April (England) 1996 EURO Q	Armenia	0–2	Spain	(Armenia) Hrazdan, Yerevan
			49' Amavisca; 63' Goikoetxea	Attendance: 35,000; Referee: (Romania) Adrian Porumboiu

7 June (England) 1996 EURO Q	Spain	1–0	Armenia	(Spain) Ramón Sánchez Pizjuán, Seville
	Hierro 64' (pen.)			Attendance: 12,000; Referee: (Luxembourg) Roger Philippi

6 September (England) 1996 EURO Q	Spain	6–0	Cyprus	(Spain) Nuevo Los Cármenes, Granada
	Guerrero 45'; Alfonso 50'; Pizzi 75', 84'; Hierro 83'; Caminero 85'			Attendance: 16,150; Referee: (Netherlands) Dick Jol

20 September Friendly	Spain	2–1	Argentina	(Spain) Vicente Calderón, Madrid
	Pizzi 35'; Guerrero 68'		80' Ortega	Attendance: 50,000; Referee: (Greece) Sotiris Vorgias

11 October (England) 1996 EURO Q	Denmark	1–1	Spain	(Denmark) Parken, Copenhagen
	Vilfort 46'		17' (pen.) Hierro	Attendance: 40,262; Referee: (Czech Republic) Václav Krondl

15 November (England) 1996 EURO Q	Spain	3–0	Macedonia	(Spain) Estadio Martínez Valero, Elche
	Kiko 8'; Manjarín 72'; Caminero 79'			Attendance: 40,000; Referee: (Germany) Edgar Steinborn

=== 1996 ===
7 February Friendly	Spain	1–0	Norway	(Spain) Insular, Las Palmas de G.C., Canary Islands
	Kiko 44'			Attendance: 18,500; Referee: (Italy) Marcello Nicchi

24 April Friendly	Norway	0–0	Spain	(Norway) Ullevaal, Oslo
				Attendance: 11,898; Referee: (Germany) Georg Dardenne

9 June (England) 1996 EURO GS	Spain	1–1	Bulgaria	(England) Elland Road, Leeds
15:30 CEST	Alfonso 73'		64' (pen.) Stoichkov	Attendance: 24,006; Referee: (Italy) Piero Ceccarini

15 June (England) 1996 EURO GS	France	1–1	Spain	(England) Elland Road, Leeds
19:00 CEST	Djorkaeff 48'		87' Caminero	Attendance: 35,626; Referee: (Belarus) Vadim Zhuk

18 June (England) 1996 EURO GS	Romania	1–2	Spain	(England) Elland Road, Leeds
17:30 CEST	Răducioiu 29'		10' Manjarín; 83' Amor	Attendance: 32,719; Referee: (Turkey) Ahmet Çakar

22 June (England) 1996 EURO QF	England	0–0 (a.e.t.) (4–2 p)	Spain	(England) Wembley, London
16:00 CEST				Attendance: 75,440; Referee: (France) Marc Batta
	Penalties
	Shearer (penalty scored); Platt (penalty scored); Pearce (penalty scored); Gascoigne (penalty scored)		(penalty missed) Hierro; (penalty scored) Amor; (penalty scored) Belsúe; (penalty missed) Nadal

4 September (France) 1998 W.C. Q	Faroe Islands	2–6	Spain	(Faroe Islands) Svangaskard, Toftir
	Jónsson 46'; Arge 89'		37' Luis Enrique; 63', 83', 86' Alfonso; 70' (o.g.) Johannesen; 85' Hierro	Attendance: 4,200; Referee: (France) Philippe Leduc

9 October (France) 1998 W.C. Q	Czech Republic	0–0	Spain	(Czech Republic) Letná, Prague
				Attendance: 19,223; Referee: (Sweden) Anders Frisk

13 November (France) 1998 W.C. Q	Spain	4–1	Slovakia	(Spain) H. Rodríguez López, Tenerife, Canary Islands
	Pizzi 39'; Amor 46'; Luis Enrique 57'; Hierro 61'		40' Tittel	Attendance: 13,500; Referee: (Germany) Markus Merk

14 December (France) 1998 W.C. Q	Spain	2–0	FR Yugoslavia	(Spain) Mestalla, Valencia
	Guardiola 18' (pen.); Raúl 37'			Attendance: 37,000; Referee: (Switzerland) Serge Muhmenthaler

18 December (France) 1998 W.C. Q	Malta	0–3	Spain	(Malta) National Stadium, Ta'Qali
			7', 26', 33' Guerrero	Attendance: 3,200; Referee: (Russia) Nikolai Levnikov

=== 1997 ===
12 February (France) 1998 W.C. Q	Spain	4–0	Malta	(Spain) Rico Pérez, Alicante
	Guardiola 25'; Alfonso 40', 46'; Pizzi 89'			Attendance: 28,000; Referee: (England) Stephen Lodge

30 April (France) 1998 W.C. Q	FR Yugoslavia	1–1	Spain	(Federal Republic of Yugoslavia) Crvena Zvezda, Belgrade
	Mijatović 86' (pen.)		18' (pen.) Hierro	Attendance: 49,253; Referee: (Norway) Rune Pedersen

8 June (France) 1998 W.C. Q	Spain	1–0	Czech Republic	(Spain) Nuevo José Zorrilla, Valladolid
	Hierro 40' (pen.)			Attendance: 24,544; Referee: (Scotland) Hugh Dallas

24 September (France) 1998 W.C. Q	Slovakia	1–2	Spain	(Slovakia) Tehelne Pole, Bratislava
	Majoroš 75'		46' Kiko; 76' Amor	Attendance: 13,667; Referee: (Hungary) Laszlo Vagner

11 October (France) 1998 W.C. Q	Spain	3–1	Faroe Islands	(Spain) El Molinón, Gijón, Asturias
	Luis Enrique 19', 84'; Oli 27'		44' Hansen	Attendance: 25,000; Referee: (Poland) Jacek Granat

19 November Friendly	Spain	1–1	Romania	(Spain) Lluís Sitjar, Mallorca, Balearic Islands
	Etxeberria 49'		82' Popescu	Attendance: 30,000; Referee: (Italy) Fiorenzo Treossi

=== 1998 ===
28 January Friendly	France	1–0	Spain	Stade de France, Saint-Denis, Paris
	Zidane 20'			Attendance: 78,836; Referee: (Switzerland) Urs Meier

25 March Friendly	Spain	4–0	Sweden	(Spain) Balaídos, Vigo, Pontevedra
	Morientes 2', 6'; Raúl 31'; Etxeberria 70'			Attendance: 17,000; Referee: (Germany) Georg Dardenne

3 June Friendly	Spain	4–1	Northern Ireland	(Spain) El Sardinero, Santander
	Pizzi 29', 37'; Morientes 47', 67'		43' Gerry	Attendance: 18,120; Referee: (France) Gilles Veissière

13 June (France) 1998 W.C. GS	Nigeria	3–2	Spain	(France) Stade de la Beaujoire, Nantes
14:30 CEST	Adepoju 25'; Zubizarreta 73' (o.g.); Oliseh 78'		21' Hierro; 47' Raúl	Attendance: 33,257; Referee: (United States) Esfandiar Baharmast

19 June (France) 1998 W.C. GS	Spain	0–0	Paraguay	(France) Geoffroy-Guichard, Saint-Étienne
21:00 CEST				Attendance: 30,600; Referee: (South Africa) Ian McLeod

24 June (France) 1998 W.C. GS	Spain	6–1	Bulgaria	(France) Félix-Bollaert, Lens
21:00 CEST	Hierro 5' (pen.); Luis Enrique 18'; Morientes 52', 83'; Kiko 86', 90'		57' Kostadinov	Attendance: 38,100; Referee: (Netherlands) Mario van der Ende

5 September (Belgium) (Netherlands) 2000 EURO Q	Cyprus	3–2	Spain	(Cyprus) Antonis Papadopoulos, Larnaca
	Engomitis 43'; Gogić 49'; Špoljarić 77'		73' Raúl; 90' Morientes	Attendance: 1,876; Referee: (Russia) Sergey Husainov

23 September Friendly	Spain	1–0	Russia	(Spain) Nuevo Los Cármenes, Granada
	Alkiza 39'			Attendance: 16,000; Referee: (Morocco) Said Belqola

14 October (Belgium) (Netherlands) 2000 EURO Q	Israel	1–2	Spain	(Israel) Ramat Gan Stadium, Ramat Gan
	Hazan 64'		66' Hierro; 78' Etxeberría	Attendance: 37,000; Referee: (England) David Elleray

18 November Friendly	Italy	2–2	Spain	(Italy) Arechi, Salerno
	Inzaghi 13', 74'		33' De Pedro; 82' (pen.) Raúl	Attendance: 17,981; Referee: (Belgium) Fernand Meese

=== 1999 ===
27 March (Belgium) (Netherlands) 2000 EURO Q	Spain	9–0	Austria	(Spain) Mestalla, Valencia
	Raúl 6', 17', 47', 75'; Urzaiz 30', 44'; Hierro 35' (pen.); Wetl 76' (o.g.); Fran 84'			Attendance: 45,000; Referee: (France) Gilles Veissière

31 March (Belgium) (Netherlands) 2000 EURO Q	San Marino	0–6	Spain	(San Marino) Olimpico, Serravalle
			20' Fran; 45', 59', 66' Raúl; 49' Urzaiz; 72' Etxeberria	Attendance: 1,500; Referee: (Croatia) Goran Marić

5 May Friendly	Spain	3–1	Croatia	(Spain) Olímpico de La Cartuja, Seville
	Engonga 34'; Hierro 48' (pen.); Dani 84'		10' Šuker	Attendance: 57,000; Referee: (Italy) Pierluigi Collina

5 June (Belgium) (Netherlands) 2000 EURO Q	Spain	9–0	San Marino	(Spain) El Madrigal, Vila-Real, Castellón
	Hierro 8'; Luis Enrique 23', 67', 67'; Etxeberria 25', 45'; Raúl 56'; Gennari 87' (o.g.); Mendieta 90'			Attendance: 16,000; Referee: (Republic of Ireland) Gerard Perry

18 August Friendly	Poland	1–2	Spain	(Poland) Wojska Polskiego, Warsaw
	Hajto 7'		54' Morientes; 66' Munitis	Attendance: 8,000; Referee: (Russia) Sergey Husainov

4 September (Belgium) (Netherlands) 2000 EURO Q	Austria	1–3	Spain	(Austria) Ernst-Happel, Vienna
	Hierro 49' (o.g.)		22' Raúl; 56' Hierro; 88' Luis Enrique	Attendance: 27,000; Referee: (Belgium) Michel Piraux

8 September (Belgium) (Netherlands) 2000 EURO Q	Spain	8–0	Cyprus	(Spain) Nuevo Vivero, Badajoz
	Urzaiz 20', 25', 38'; Guerrero 33', 42', 56'; César 82'; Hierro 88'			Attendance: 12,500; Referee: (Italy) Alfredo Trentalange

10 October (Belgium) (Netherlands) 2000 EURO Q	Spain	3–0	Israel	(Spain) Carlos Belmonte, Albacete
	Morientes 30'; César 37'; Raúl 51'			Attendance: 16,100; Referee: (Germany) Hellmut Krug

13 November Friendly	Spain	0–0	Brazil	(Spain) Balaídos, Vigo, Pontevedra
				Attendance: 31,000; Referee: (Netherlands) René Temmink

17 November Friendly	Spain	0–2	Argentina	(Spain) Olímpico de La Cartuja, Seville
			40' González; 76' Pochettino	Attendance: 65,000; Referee: (Greece) Giorgos Psyhomanis
