= Pocas =

Portuguese footballer (born 1913)

Personal information
- Full name: Manuel dos Anjos
- Date of birth: 18 March 1913
- Place of birth: Chaves, Portugal
- Date of death: unknown
- Position: Midfielder

Senior career*
| Years | Team | Apps | (Gls) |
| 1935–1946 | Porto | 167 | (3) |

International career
| 1941 | Portugal | 1 | (0) |
- * Club domestic league appearances and goals

Manuel dos Anjos (born 18 March 1913, date of death unknown), also known as Pocas, was a Portuguese footballer who played as midfielder in service of FC Porto.

== Honours ==
Porto

- Primeira Liga (2): 1938–39, 1939–40
- Campeonato de Portugal (1): 1936–37
