= José María Arteche =

Spanish footballer

Personal information
- Full name: José María Arteche Aldanondo
- Date of birth: 19 March 1912
- Place of birth: Tolosa, Gipuzkoa, Spain
- Date of death: Unknown
- Position: Forward

Senior career*
| Years | Team | Apps | (Gls) |
| 1928–1931 | Tolosa CF | | |
| 1931–1932 | Atlético Madrid | 3 | (1) |
| 1932–1936 | Racing de Santander | 26 | (17) |
- * Club domestic league appearances and goals

José María Arteche Aldanondo (19 March 1912 – Unknown) was a Spanish footballer who played as a forward for Atlético Madrid and Racing de Santander.

== Biography ==
José María Arteche was born on 19 March 1912 in Tolosa, Gipuzkoa, and he began his football career at his hometown club Tolosa CF, then in the Segunda División, playing 8 league matches as Tolosa was relegated to the Tercera División.

At Tolosa, he formed an attacking partnership with fellow Gipuzkoan teenager Isidro Lángara, who stood out among the rest due to his powerful shots and goalscoring ability, which eventually drew the attention of bigger clubs, such as Atlético Madrid, then also in the second division, whose president Luciano Urquijo sent Ángel Romo to Tolosa to sign Lángara, but doing so with unclear instructions, telling Romo only to bring “the center forward, whatever the price". However, that day Arteche was the one who occupied the position of center forward, with Lángara playing as an interior forward, and since the jerseys did not yet have names or numbers back then, Romo signed Arteche instead, for 20,000 pesetas. Even though he was a good player, Arteche had one leg shorter than the other, so he had very few chances at Atlético, which did not renew his contract at the end of the 1931–32 season despite the fact that he had managed to score twice in his only four matches with the club, including his side's only goal in a 1–3 loss to CD Alavés in a 1932 cup round of 16 tiebreaker, in which he replaced the sanctioned Santiago Losada and then scored his goal with a volley after a good combination with Santiago Buiría.

In 1932, Arteche signed for Racing de Santader, then in the first division, where he once again had few chances, making only one appearance in his first season there, in a match against CD Alavés at the Mendizorrotza Stadium on 27 November, in which he scored in a 2–8 loss. He played more in his next two seasons at the club, and on 30 December 1934, he netted a hat-trick in a La Liga match to help his side to a 6–0 win over Athletic Bilbao. In total, he scored 17 goals in 26 league matches for Racing.
