= Soares dos Reis =

Portuguese footballer

Personal information
- Full name: Manuel José Soares dos Reis
- Date of birth: 11 March 1910
- Place of birth: Penafiel, Portugal
- Date of death: 15 April 1990 (aged 80)
- Position: Goalkeeper

Senior career*
Years	Team	Apps	(Gls)
1929–1930	Leça	4	(0)
1932–1933	Boavista	3	(0)
1933–1940	Porto		

International career
1934–1936	Portugal	4	(0)
- * Club domestic league appearances and goals

Manuel José Soares dos Reis (11 March 1910, Penafiel – 15 April 1990) was a Portuguese footballer who played as a goalkeeper.
