= João Nova =

Portuguese footballer

João da Nova
Personal information
- Full name: João Vicente da Nova
- Date of birth: 1 April 1907
- Place of birth: Kingdom of Portugal
- Position: Midfielder

Senior career*
Years	Team	Apps	(Gls)
1931–1932	Boavista		
1932–1937	Porto		

International career
1934	Portugal	1	(0)
- * Club domestic league appearances and goals

João Vicente da Nova (born 1 April 1907; date of death unknown) was a Portuguese footballer who played as a midfielder.
