= 1983 Iberian Cup =

Benfica	Athletic Bilbao
Primeira Liga	La Liga
4	3
- on aggregate

First leg
Benfica	Athletic Bilbao
1	2
- Date: 17 August 1983
- Venue: San Mamés, Bilbao
- Referee: Victoriano Sánchez Arminio

Second leg
Athletic Bilbao	Benfica
1	3
- Date: 24 August 1983
- Venue: Estádio da Luz, Lisbon
- Referee: Rosa Santos

The 1983 Iberian Cup was the second edition of the Iberian Cup, brought back in time almost 50 years after the first one in 1935. It was held in August 1983 as a two-legged game between Benfica (Primeira Liga winners) and Athletic Bilbao (La Liga winners).

== Participats ==
Clubs	Country	Champions
(Portugal) Benfica	Lisbon	1982–83 Primeira Liga
(Spain) Athletic Bilbao	Bilbao	1982–83 La Liga

== Overview ==
This competition was suggested by the clubs and supported by the federations of each country, with the federation that hosted the second leg offering the trophy.

In the first leg, which was held on 17 August at the San Mamés Stadium in Bilbao, the home team took the lead in the 16th minute thanks to Miguel Sola, but Benfica found an equalizer just 15 minutes later via Nené. The game looked to be heading to a draw until the hosts found a late winner through Miguel de Andrés.

In the second leg, which was held on 24 August at the Estádio da Luz in Lisbon, Benfica took advantage of playing at home to score three unanswered goals in the first half, and even though Athletic scored a consolation goal in the second, it was not enough to stop Benfica from being crowned champions after losing 2–1 in Spain and winning 3–1 in Portugal. Between both matches, Benfica also played the 1983 Taça de Portugal final, defeating their rivals FC Porto 1–0 in their own stadium at Antas.

== Matches ==
17 August 1983
1st leg

Athletic Bilbao	2–1	Benfica
Sola 16' de Andrés 83'	RSSSF; Bdfutbol; Athletic Club website	30' Nené

San Mamés Stadium, Bilbao, Spain
Referee: Victoriano Sánchez Arminio

24 August 1983
2nd leg

Benfica	3–1	Athletic Bilbao
Filipović 23'; Nené 30', 44'	RSSSF; Bdfutbol; Athletic Club website	70' Sola

Estádio da Luz, Lisbon, Portugal
Referee: Rosa Santos

1983 Iberian Cup
Benfica
First title

== Aftermatch ==
The Iberian Cup kickstarted a historic season for both teams as they went on to become two-time champions, although Athletic have not won a La Liga title since.
