= Pepe Valera =

Spanish footballer and manager

Personal information
- Birth name: José Valera Nocera
- Date of birth: 26 May 1916
- Place of birth: Seville, Spain
- Date of death: 13 May 2006 (aged 89)
- Place of death: Jerez de la Frontera, Spain
- Position: Forward

Youth career
- 1930–1932: Real Betis Cantera

Senior career*
Years	Team	Apps	(Gls)
1932–1936	Real Betis		
1939–1941	Real Betis		
1947–1948	CD Nervión		
1948–1949	España de Tánger		

Managerial career
- 1950–1952: Juventud Balompié
- 1953–1955: Recreativo de Huelva
- 1955–1957: Real Betis
- 1958: Recreativo de Huelva
- 1958–1959: Málaga
- 1959–1960: Xerez
- 1960: Real Jaén
- 1962–1963: Atlético Baleares
- 1963–1965: Cádiz
- 1965–1966: Triana Balompié
- 1966–1968: Real Betis
- 1970–1971: Xerez
- 1971–1972: Hércules
- 1972: Recreativo de Huelva
- 1973–1975: Xerez
- 1977–1978: Jerez Industrial
- 1979–1981: Xerez
- * Club domestic league appearances and goals

José Valera Nocera, better known as Pepe Valera (26 May 1916 – 13 May 2006), was a Spanish footballer who played as a forward for Real Betis in the 1930s, and later a manager, taking charge over the likes of Real Betis, Recreativo de Huelva, and Cádiz in the 1950s and 1960s. He is considered one of the most important figures in the history of Real Betis, which he served as an amateur player, as the youngest member of the squad that won the La Liga title in 1934–35, as coach of both its reserve team and its first team, and even as technical secretary.

== Playing career ==
Born on 26 May 1916 in Seville, Valera began his football career in Real Betis Cantera, the youth team of his hometown club Real Betis, where he quickly stood out from the rest, so he soon made his debut with the first team on 15 January 1933, in a friendly match against Xerez, helping his side to a 5–1 win, (Note: Some sources that he made his debut for Betis in a friendly in 1932.) and just three months later, on 8 April, he made his official competitive debut for Betis in the first leg of the Copa del Rey round of 16 against Barcelona at Las Corts. At the time, he had not yet sign anything because his father did not want him to commit to the club, so he went to Las Corts on an amateur contract, receiving only a 500 peseta note, plus a 300-peseta bonus as a reward for knocking out Barça.

In 1934, Valera was sought after by Sevilla, whose president Ramón Sánchez-Pizjuán was also his father's lawyer, so to avoid losing a player to their direct rivals, Betis signed him as a professional. Aged 18, he was the youngest member of the Betis team that won the 1934–35 La Liga title, the first (and only) league title in club's history; however, he did not play a major role in these triumph as he only played in two league matches that season. He improved in the following season, where he played in 7 league matches, but his career was then interrupted by the outbreak of the Spanish Civil War.

Like so many others, Valera was sent to the front, remaining there until the end of the War in 1939, and returning to his hometown with the rank of lieutenant. This experience made him contemplate whether he should continue to play football or pursue a military career, and after a further two mixed seasons with Betis between 1939 and 1941, he opted for the latter, going to the Academy and earning the rank of captain. In total, he scored 4 goals in 27 La Liga matches. Due to a shortage of players in the post-Civil War period, he was suggested to Real Madrid in 1939, but his father found out and said, "I would d rather break your leg than have it broken on the pitch". His military career took him to Menorca, where he stayed for two years, and following a short stint in Algeciras, he settled in Seville in the late 1940s, where he played his last football for CD Nervión, and España de Tánger, with whom he only played one match, an early round in the 1948–49 Copa del Generalísimo against Larache on 5 September, which ended in a 1–3 loss.

== Managerial career ==
=== First steps ===
After his career as a player ended, Valera remained linked to Real Betis, now as a technical secretary, assuming this position in 1948, when the club only had 1,200 members, a weak financial situation, and no youth teams. As the soldier that he was, Valera mobilized everyone because "no one could stay out of this battle", asking the members to invest one peseta to start a youth section. Valera even asked the club's kit man Alberto Tenorio to make a piece of furniture to store clothes, and he too began to take the necessary materials from the troop warehouse to make the children's uniforms.

Valera then set up a scouting system capable of locating players, confirming their potential, and then convincing them that playing in the lower echelons of Betis was their best option, and eventually, after months of hard work, Betis finally managed to gather enough players to assemble two youth teams known as A and Z, but within just five years, it developed into a youth system with 14 or 15 teams, with Juventud Balompié even reaching the Tercera División. He even personally coached Juventud Balompié for two years, from 1950 until the summer of 1952, during which he obtained the credentials of national coach in the course held in Burgos.

His new credentials allowed him to take charge of the first team of another Andalusian club, Recreativo de Huelva, a position that he held for two years, from 1953 until 1955. During this period, from 1948 to 1957, Valera's initiaves successfully scouted the likes of Luis del Sol, José Peñafuerte, Portu, and even the coach Pedro Buenaventura. On 12 August 1952, Valera was the subject of a tribute that was organized by a group of Betis fans, which consisted of a dinner at Venta de Eritaña, and some words from club director Pascual Aparicio and former player Andrés Aranda, who praised Valera's work for Andalusian football. In 1961, he was awarded the Gold Medal for Sporting Merit by the Andalusian Football Federation, and in 1967, Betis was awarded the Amberes Trophy for "being the club with the most outstanding care and promotion of its youth academy.

=== Real Betis ===
In 1955, Valera was named as the new coach of Betis, making his debut on 12 June, in the sixth round of the Copa Andalucía against Xerez at Heliópolis. However, he only held this position for a little over a year, resigning on 23 October 1956, due to the team's poor run of results. A few days later, the Betis players offered him a dinner in an intimate and simple ceremony. After leaving Betis, he returned to Huelva, which he oversaw between January and June of 1958, as the team was relegated to the Tercera División. On 25 December 1958, he took over Málaga, a position that he held for just three months, until 14 March 1959, following 2 wins, 4 draws, and 5 losses, with 10 goals scored and 16 conceded; Málaga went on to be relegated to the Third Division. He then took over third-division side Xerez for the 1959–60 season, finishing as champion of its group with five points more than the second-placed CD Puerto, but then lost the promotion play-offs to his former club Málaga. After a two-month stint at Real Jaén between September and November 1960, he was appointed as coach of Atlético Baleares in 1962, and for the third time in his career, Valera suffered a relegation to the Third Division.

However, Valera kept getting offers to coach Second Division sides, this time from Cádiz, making his debut against Abarán on 22 December 1963 and playing his last match against Eibar on 22 June 1965 for a total of 53 matches in charge of Cádiz, fighting for promotion in his second season at the club. In 1965, Villamarín told Valera to return home, with whom he stayed for five years, during which he once again played several roles, such as technical secretary again, director of the youth academy, the coach of Triana Balompié in 1965–66, and the coach of the first team for two years between 1966 and 1968, achieving promotion to La Liga in his first season and then relegation to the Second Division in his second season.

=== Later career ===
After leaving Betis in 1970, Valera returned to Xerez, which he had coached 10 years earlier, and in his first season back, he led the team into a promotion to the Second Division. After a short stint at Hércules (1971–72), Valera briefly returned to Recreativo de Huelva in 1972, before returning to Xerez in 1973, where he stayed for two more seasons, until 1975. He replaced Ventura Martínez midway through the season and led his side to a sixth-place finish. He later coached Jerez Industrial in the 1977–78 season and Xerez for the third time between 1979 and 1981. In the 1981–82 season, the then Xerez president Manuel Riquelme awarded the gold badge to Valera, who remained linked to the club as technical secretary until 1985. Having remained active in the world of football until the mid-1980s, Betis went to Estadio Domecq in the summer of 1987 to pay him a tribute.

== Personal life ==
Like so many Sevillians of the time, Valera would spend his summers in Cádiz, even after his two-year stint there (1963–65), such as in the summer of 1966, in which he and his son José Maria crossed paths with José María de la Concha, who had shown up to the Cádiz beach wearing a shirt that had been sweated out by Pelé himself, (Note: Concha had gotten Pelé's shirt just a few weeks earlier, on 21 June, after a friendly between Atlético Madrid and the Brazilian national team, who was on their way to England for the 1966 FIFA World Cup.) so his son besieged and bored De la Concha for weeks until he got it.

== Death ==
Pepe Valera died in Jerez de la Frontera on 13 May 2006, just two weeks shy of his 90th birthday. At the time of his death, he was the last surviving member of the Betis squad who had won the league in 1935.

== Honours ==
Real Betis

- La Liga
  - Champions (1): 1934–35
