= Victorio Unamuno =

Spanish footballer (1909–1988)

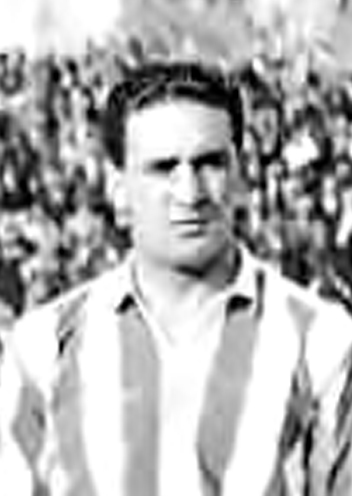
- Unamuno in 1931

Personal information
- Full name: Victorio Unamuno Ibarzabal
- Date of birth: 21 May 1909
- Place of birth: Bergara, Spain
- Date of death: 20 May 1988 (aged 78)
- Place of death: Durango, Spain
- Position: Forward

Youth career
- 1924–1927: Aurrerá Bergara

Senior career*
Years	Team	Apps	(Gls)
1927–1928	Alavés		
1928–1933	Athletic Bilbao	45	(36)
1933–1936	Betis	55	(29)
1939–1942	Athletic Bilbao	44	(36)
Total		144	(101)
- * Club domestic league appearances and goals

Victorio Unamuno Ibarzabal (21 May 1909 – 20 May 1988), also known as Unamuno I, was a Spanish footballer who played as a forward.

He amassed La Liga totals of 144 games and 101 goals, with Athletic Bilbao and Betis.

== Career ==
Unamuno was born in Bergara, Gipuzkoa. After helping Deportivo Alavés to the semi-finals of the 1928 Copa del Rey he was signed by neighbouring Athletic Bilbao to be part of their team in the newly-formed national league. He went on win two La Liga titles and four consecutive domestic cups, notably forming an attacking partnership with Bata, Guillermo Gorostiza, José Iraragorri, Chirri II and Lafuente.

In the summer of 1933, Unamuno joined Real Betis. In the 1934–35 season he scored a team-best 13 goals, and the club won its first and only national championship.

After leaving Seville, Unamuno's career was interrupted by the Spanish Civil War, and he subsequently returned to Athletic. In the 1939–40 campaign he netted 20 times – and Gorostiza added 16 – en route to being crowned the competition's Pichichi, helping the side to third place; he retired in 1942, aged 33.

== Personal life ==
Unamuno's younger brother, Vicente (1917–1988, known as Unamuno II), was also a footballer and a forward. The siblings were teammates at Athletic Bilbao during 1939–40 even though the latter did not appear in the league, but the pair did help the club win the Biscay Championship in that year; the former died in Durango, Biscay, one day before his 79th birthday.

== Honours ==
Athletic Bilbao

- La Liga: 1929–30, 1930–31
- Copa del Rey: 1930, 1931, 1932, 1933
- Biscay Championship: 1928–29, 1930–31, 1931–32, 1932–33, 1939–40

Betis

- La Liga: 1934–35

Individual

- Pichichi Trophy: 1939–40
