= Carlos Pereira (footballer, born 1910) =

Portuguese footballer

Personal information
- Full name: Carlos Jesus Pereira
- Date of birth: 3 September 1910
- Place of birth: Portugal
- Position: Midfielder

Senior career*
Years	Team	Apps	(Gls)
1933–1934	Boavista		
1934–1942	FC Porto		

International career
1935–1942	Portugal	13	(1)
- * Club domestic league appearances and goals

Carlos Jesus Pereira (born 3 September 1910, date of death unknown) was a Portuguese footballer who played as midfielder.

== International career ==
Pereira gained 13 caps and scored 1 goal for Portugal. He made his debut 5 May 1935 in Lisbon against Spain, in a 3-3 draw.
