= La Puebla de Cazalla =

- Town
- Flag Coat of arms

- Location in Andalusia
- Coordinates: 37°13′20″N 5°18′45″W
- Country: Spain
- Autonomous community: Andalusia
- Province: Seville
- Comarca: Sierra Sur

Government
  - Alcalde: Antonio Martín Melero

Area
  - Total: 188 km^{2} (73 sq mi)
- Elevation: 177 m (581 ft)

Population (2025-01-01)
  - Total: 10,830
  - Density: 57.6/km^{2} (149/sq mi)
- Time zone: UTC+1 (CET)
  - Summer (DST): UTC+2 (CEST)
- Website: www.pueblacazalla.org

La Puebla de Cazalla is a town located in the province of Seville, Spain. According to the 2018 census (INE), it had a population of 11,033.

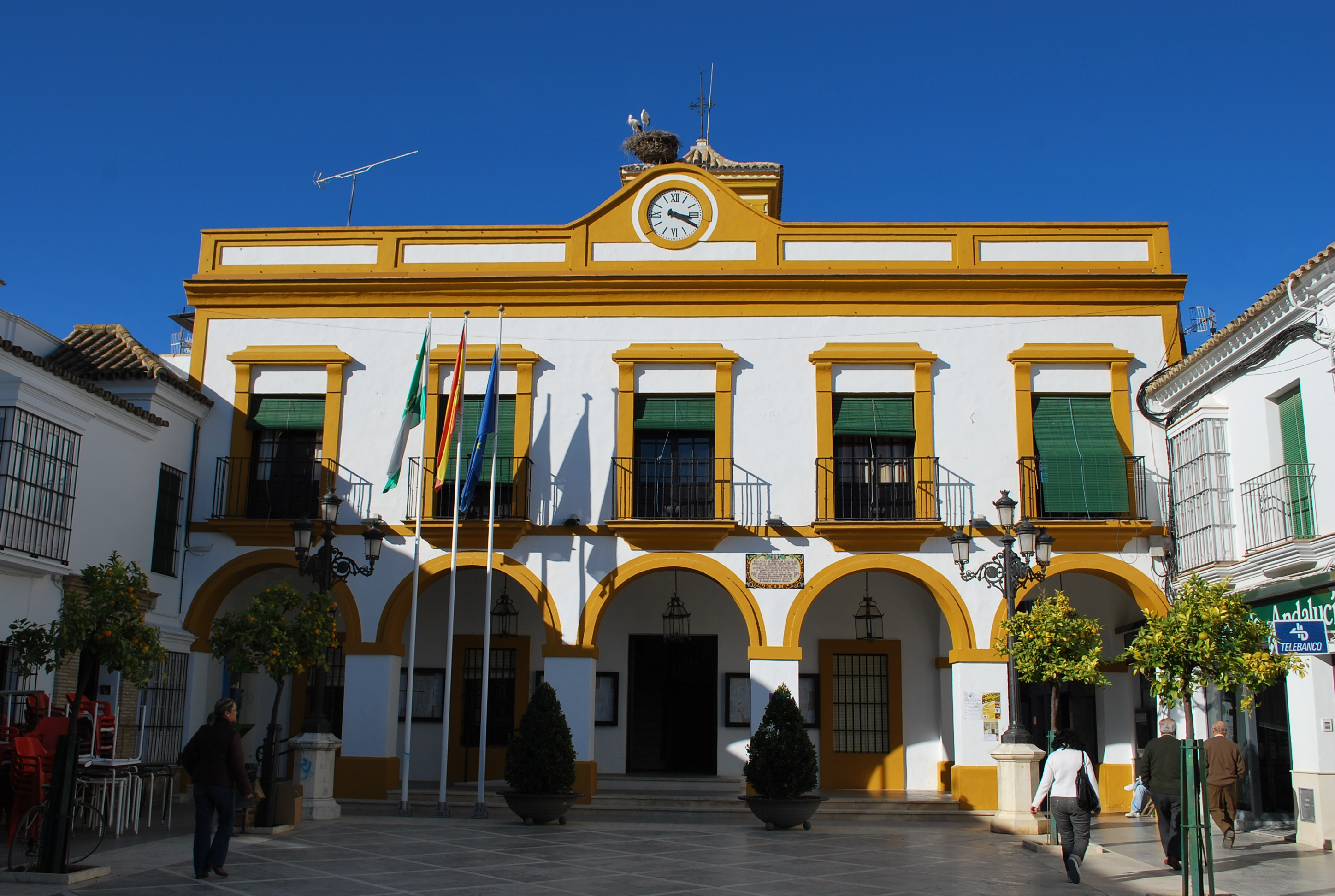
Town Hall of La Puebla de Cazalla

== See also ==
- List of municipalities in Seville
