= Iberian Cup =

- Founded: 1935
- Region: Spain and Portugal
- Teams: 2
- Current champions: Vitória de Setúbal

The Iberian Cup, also called Iberian Supercup, is a friendly association football international competition between Portuguese and Spanish clubs, and disputed by two teams (one Portuguese and one Spanish) that were champions in a major competition, very much alike a Supercup, to find out which was the best team from Iberian Peninsula.

== History ==
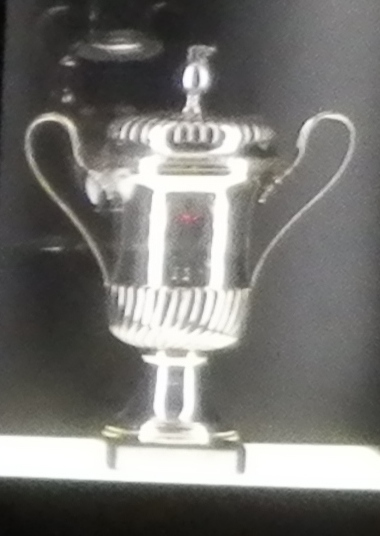
Benfica's Iberian Cup (1983)

The first Iberian Cup was played on 7 July 1935. Porto and Real Betis were both league champions, and played a single match which Porto won. The first edition of the Cup was not officially recognized by both federations.

The second Iberian Cup happened forty eight years after the first edition, and was played throughout two matches. This time it was also between the Portuguese and Spanish league champions Benfica and Athletic Bilbao. It was the first edition that was officially recognized by both federations, and the FPF even provided the trophy for the competition.

In 1991, it was disputed between the Portuguese champions Benfica and the Copa del Rey winner Atlético de Madrid, and eventually won by the Spanish side.

In 2000, European champions Real Madrid faced Portuguese league champions Sporting CP, and the competition also returned to the single match format. Sporting defeated Real Madrid.

Finally in 2005, the champions from both national cups faced each other, Vitória de Setúbal and Real Betis. This time the teams asked both national football federations to approve another edition of the Iberian Cup, which gave the competition one more time an official character.

== Winners ==
Edition	year	Champion	Competition *	Result	Runner-up	Competition *
Iberian Cup I	1935	(Portugal) Porto	Primeira Liga	4–2	(Spain) Real Betis	La Liga
Iberian Cup II	1983	(Portugal) Benfica	Primeira Liga	1–2 / 3–1	(Spain) Athletic Bilbao	La Liga
Iberian Cup III	1991	(Spain) Atlético de Madrid	Copa del Rey	1–1 / 3–2	(Portugal) Benfica	Primeira Liga
Peninsular Cup	2000	(Portugal) Sporting CP	Primeira Liga	2–1	(Spain) Real Madrid	Champions League
Iberian Supercup	2005	(Portugal) Vitória de Setúbal	Taça de Portugal	2–1	(Spain) Real Betis	Copa del Rey

- * The competitions from which they were champions at the time.

== Finalists table ==
Club	Winner	Runner-up
(Portugal) Porto	1 (1935)	
(Portugal) Benfica	1 (1983)	1 (1991)
(Spain) Atlético de Madrid	1 (1991)	
(Portugal) Sporting CP	1 (2000)	
(Portugal) Vitória de Setúbal	1 (2005)	
(Spain) Real Betis		2 (1935, 2005)
(Spain) Athletic Bilbao		1 (1983)
(Spain) Real Madrid		1 (2000)
