= 1934–35 La Liga =

7th season of La Liga

Primera División
- Season: 1934–35
- Champions: Betis (1st title)
- Relegated: Donostia; Arenas
- Matches: 132
- Goals: 541 (4.1 per match)
- Top goalscorer: Isidro Lángara (26 goals)
- Biggest home win: Athletic Bilbao 8–0 Arenas
- Biggest away win: Racing Santander 0–5 Betis
- Highest scoring: Oviedo 8–3 Español
- Longest winning run: 6 matches Madrid FC
- Longest unbeaten run: 9 matches Athletic Madrid
- Longest winless run: 13 matches Arenas
- Longest losing run: 8 matches Arenas

The 1934–35 season of La Liga began on 2 December 1934 and finished on 28 April 1935. It was won by Betis for the first and to date only time. It was also the first time Sevilla, Betis' cross-city rival, participated.

== Team information ==
Location of teams in 1934–35 La Liga

Club	City	Stadium
Arenas	Getxo	Ibaiondo
Athletic Bilbao	Bilbao	San Mamés
Athletic Madrid	Madrid	Metropolitano
Barcelona	Barcelona	Les Corts
Betis	Seville	Patronato Obrero
Donostia	San Sebastián	Atocha
Español	Barcelona	Sarriá
Madrid FC	Madrid	Chamartín
Oviedo	Oviedo	Buenavista
Racing Santander	Santander	El Sardinero
Sevilla	Seville	Nervión
Valencia	Valencia	Mestalla

== League table ==
Pos	Team	Pld	W	D	L	GF	GA	GD	Pts	Relegation
1	Betis (C)	22	15	4	3	43	19	+24	34	
2	Madrid FC	22	16	1	5	61	34	+27	33	
3	Oviedo	22	12	2	8	60	47	+13	26	
4	Athletic Bilbao	22	11	3	8	60	37	+23	25	
5	Sevilla	22	11	2	9	53	38	+15	24 (Note: Sevilla finished ahead of Barcelona on head-to-head points: Sevilla–Barcelona 3–1, Barcelona–Sevilla 2–3.)	
6	Barcelona	22	9	6	7	55	44	+11	24	
7	Athletic Madrid	22	8	5	9	40	45	−5	21	
8	Español	22	9	2	11	47	59	−12	20 (Note: Español finished ahead of Valencia on head-to-head goal difference: Español–Valencia 1–2, Valencia–Español 1–3.)	
9	Valencia	22	9	2	11	40	49	−9	20	
10	Racing Santander	22	7	3	12	37	46	−9	17	
11	Donostia (R)	22	5	1	16	28	67	−39	11	Relegation to the Segunda División
12	Arenas (R)	22	3	3	16	17	56	−39	9	Relegation to the Segunda División

Source: BDFútbol
Rules for classification: 1) points; 2) head-to-head points; 3) head-to-head goal difference; 4) goal difference; 5) number of goals scored.
(C) Champions; (R) Relegated

== Results ==
Home \ Away	ARE	ATH	ATM	BAR	BET	DON	ESP	MAD	OVI	RAC	SEV	VAL
Arenas	—	0–1	3–1	2–2	0–3	0–1	0–4	1–2	1–2	0–1	3–2	2–1
Athletic Bilbao	8–0	—	5–2	3–5	0–0	7–0	1–2	4–1	4–0	4–2	4–0	4–1
Athletic Madrid	3–1	2–2	—	1–3	4–2	3–1	5–2	2–2	3–3	3–1	1–0	5–2
Barcelona	4–0	2–2	0–0	—	4–0	4–0	2–2	5–0	5–2	1–1	2–3	5–2
Betis	0–0	1–0	2–0	2–1	—	1–0	5–0	1–0	2–1	3–1	2–2	3–0
Donostia	3–2	0–4	4–0	2–1	2–4	—	1–4	1–2	3–5	2–3	0–0	3–1
Español	2–0	1–3	0–2	4–1	1–1	4–1	—	2–4	3–2	4–2	1–4	1–2
Madrid FC	6–1	5–2	2–0	8–2	0–1	2–0	7–2	—	2–1	3–2	3–1	3–0
Oviedo	4–1	3–2	2–1	4–3	0–1	4–0	8–3	0–3	—	3–0	4–2	4–4
Racing Santander	0–0	6–0	2–2	2–3	0–5	2–1	2–1	1–2	1–3	—	3–2	5–0
Sevilla	4–0	3–0	4–0	3–1	0–3	7–2	5–1	1–3	3–1	2–0	—	4–2
Valencia	2–0	1–0	2–0	1–1	3–1	7–1	1–3	4–1	0–4	2–0	2–1	—

Source: BDFútbol..com
Legend: Blue = home team win; Yellow = draw; Red = away team win.

== Top scorers ==
Rank	Goalscorers	Team	Goals
1	(Spain) Isidro Lángara	Oviedo	27
2	(Spain) Julio Elícegui	Athletic Madrid	20
2	(Spain) Ildefonso Sañudo	Madrid FC	20
2	(Spain) Campanal I	Sevilla	20
5	(Spain) Bata	Athletic Bilbao	17
5	(Spain) José Escolá	Barcelona	17
7	(Spain) Francisco Iriondo	Español	15
8	(Spain) Victorio Unamuno	Betis	13
8	(Spain) Luis Regueiro	Madrid FC	13
9	(Spain) José Iraragorri	Athletic Bilbao	12
9	(Spain) José María Arteche	Racing Santander	12

=== Pichichi Trophy ===
Note: This list is the alternative top scorers list provided by newspaper Diario Marca; it differs from the one above which is based on official match reports.

Goalscorers	Goal	Team
Isidro Lángara	26	Oviedo CF
Julio Elícegui	22	Athletic Club de Madrid
Ildefonso Sañudo	21	Madrid FC
Campanal I	20	Sevilla FC
