= El Viejo Clásico =

Football rivalry in Spain

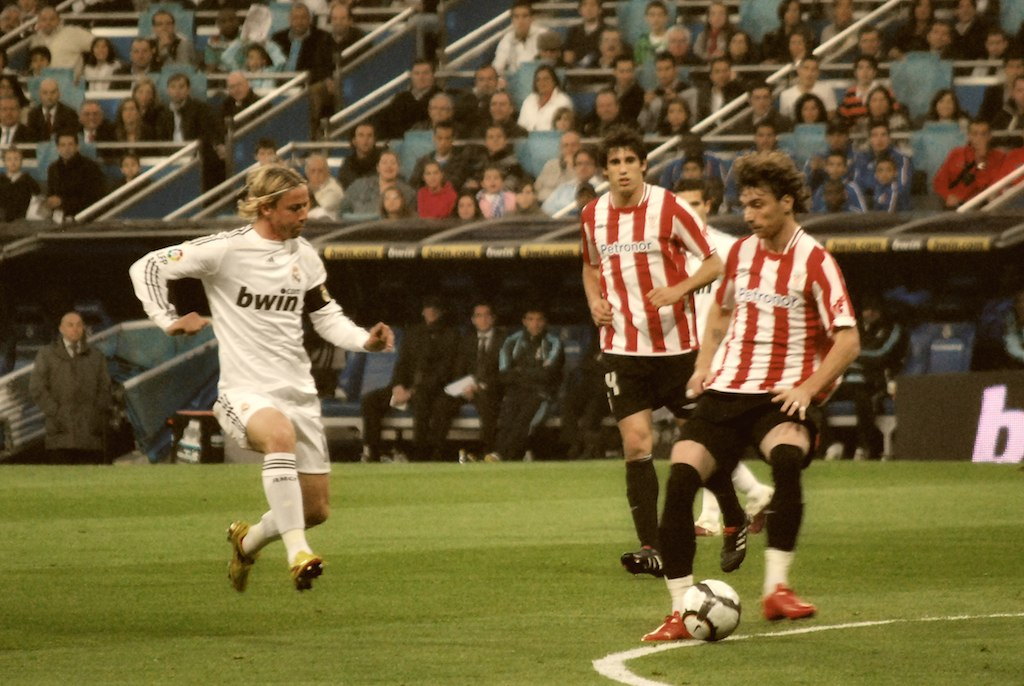
- A 2010 derby match
- Other names: El Otro Clásico
- Location: Spain
- Teams: Athletic Bilbao; Real Madrid
- First meeting: 8 April 1903; Copa del Rey; Athletic Bilbao 3–2 Real Madrid
- Latest meeting: 23 May 2026; La Liga; Real Madrid 4–2 Athletic Bilbao
- Next meeting: 7 December 2026; La Liga; Athletic Bilbao v Real Madrid
- Stadiums: San Mamés (Bilbao); Bernabéu (Madrid)

Statistics
- Total meetings: 248
- Most wins: Real Madrid (126)
- Most player appearances: Agustín Gainza (42)
- Top scorer: Telmo Zarra (24)
- Largest victory: Real Madrid 8–1 Athletic Bilbao (19 June 1960)

El Viejo Clásico (The Old Classic) is the name given to any football match between Athletic Bilbao and Real Madrid. Until 10 December 2011, this fixture was the most played in the history of Spanish football, when it was surpassed by El Clásico (between Real Madrid and FC Barcelona). However, it remains the most played game in the Copa del Rey – although only five of the 56 matches have taken place in the 21st century.

These two clubs, along with Barcelona, are the only participants in all editions of La Liga, the national league championship. Both are owned by their socios (members) who elect a club president to oversee its affairs.

== History ==
Their first meeting occurred in the final of the first edition of the Copa del Rey, played on 8 April 1903; Athletic won 3–2. That match has been identified as a catalyst for the establishment a few weeks later of what would eventually become Club Atlético de Madrid, after some Madrid-based Basque students among the spectators were inspired by the comeback victory by Athletic Bilbao and decided to form a local branch of the club.

Their first match at the original San Mamés took place in that competition in 1920. Meetings became common as Athletic Bilbao and Real Madrid dominated the regional tournaments (Biscay Championship and Madrid Regional Championship respectively), the winning of which granted access to the Copa del Rey.

The Basques and Castilians met in nine Cup finals between 1903 and 1958; Athletic won six of these matches.

=== First league matches, Francoist Spain and beyond ===
On 21 April 1929, Athletic Bilbao and Real Madrid met for the first time in La Liga; Real Madrid won the match at Chamartín 5–1. The 1929 Copa del Rey semi-final second leg in Bilbao became known as the 'frog match', after a local company distributed toys which made frog-like noises to increase the noise level in the stadium to distract the visitors, who were 3–1 up from the first leg. The ploy failed resoundingly, with Real Madrid recording a 4–1 win to progress 7–2; however they would lose the final. The two clubs would share ten of the first 25 championships (Athletic six, Madrid four) either side of the Spanish Civil War up to 1956, but from that point Los Blancos became the dominant club in the country, winning 16 titles from 26 available (plus six European Cups).

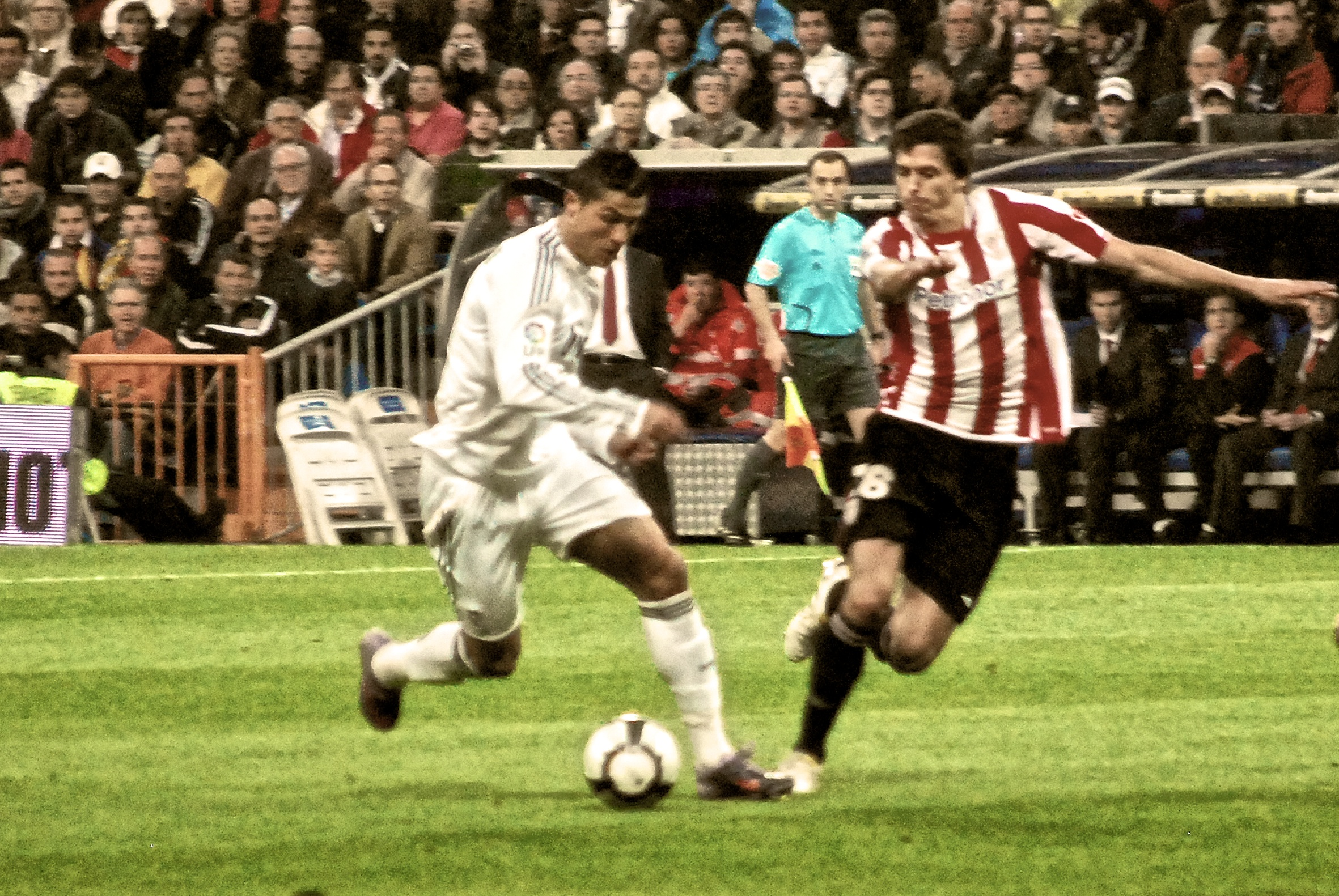
Real Madrid's Cristiano Ronaldo (left) and Athletic Bilbao's Ander Iturraspe during a match at Santiago Bernabéu Stadium, 2010

In that era, the caudillo General Franco used the success of Real Madrid (based in the capital city, the seat of power) as a vehicle to promote the Spanish State to foreigners, whereas Athletic Bilbao – the largest club in the peripheral Basque region whose customs and language were repressed by the central government – won no titles in the same period, only even finishing runners-up once.

The Basques and other regions regained more self-control in the years following Franco's death in 1975, symbolised by the joint display of the banned Basque flag by the captains of Athletic and local rivals Real Sociedad at a match between them a year later. However, many of the supporters of Athletic and Real Madrid, including their Ultras groups (Herri Norte and Ultras Sur respectively), still adhere to opposing views in terms of their national identity. In this regard, the relationship has similarities with the more famous and intense El Clásico rivalry between Real Madrid and Barcelona (representing Catalonia).

On the field, a competitive edge was briefly restored in the early 1980s when Athletic built a strong combative team that won the league twice, finishing ahead of Real Madrid by one point in 1983 with the top spot changing hands on the last day; the season was nothing short of a disaster for the Meringues, who also lost in the finals of the Supercopa, the Copa del Rey (to a last-minute goal), the European Cup Winners' Cup (in extra time), and the Copa de la Liga. In the following campaign, Athletic pipped Madrid by a single goal and better head-to-head record, but their league and cup double that year was the last time they lifted either trophy; Real Madrid soon responded with a run of five-in-a-row, led by their group of homegrown talent, La Quinta del Buitre.

During a hotly-contested fixture in Bilbao in March 1990, the referee awarded a dubious penalty to the away side and had to halt the game for 12 minutes after objects were thrown at the linesman and Madrid goalkeeper Paco Buyo. The match finished as normal, but as a consequence the San Mamés stadium was closed for one match, with Athletic playing Real Valladolid at the Atotxa Stadium in San Sebastián.

=== 21st century ===
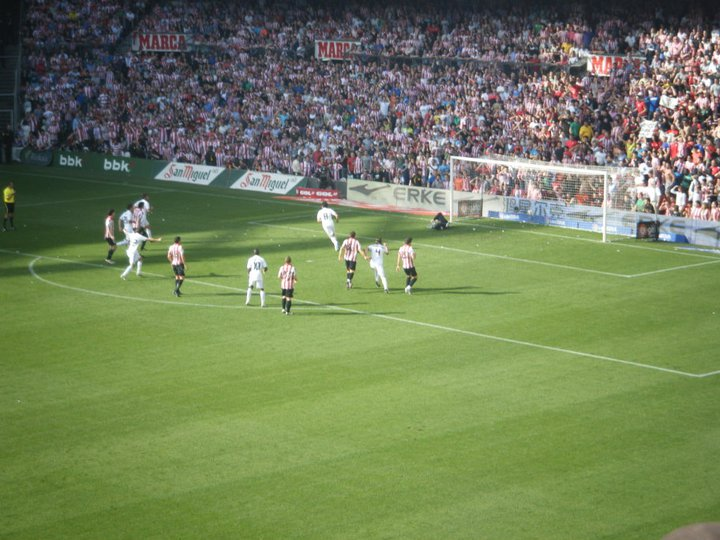
Kaká scoring a penalty at the old San Mamés in 2011

Entering the 21st century, clubs such as Atlético Madrid (their city rivals who were originally formed as an offshoot of Athletic Bilbao and thus have a similar name, crest and kit), Valencia and Barcelona began to challenge Real Madrid. In an age of worldwide recruitment exemplified by Madrid's Galácticos, the club who won nine further Champions Leagues between 1998 and 2024, cemented a global fanbase, and ranked among the world's richest, most decorated and best-attended.

Athletic Bilbao were not among the group of challengers, now hampered by their self-imposed restrictive Basque-only player policy. They have a much lower profile in terms of media exposure and global interest, and on the field have occasionally flirted with relegation (a situation observed with derision at the Santiago Bernabéu Stadium), although they have consistently ranked among the top six clubs in Spain for performance, matchday attendance and popularity. Nevertheless, despite the disparities in stature between the two clubs, the fixtures remain keenly fought due to their historical and cultural significance. A 2002 fixture between the teams was noteworthy for a peripheral event, with the pitch being invaded by Basque nationalist activists protesting against the conditions for ETA (separatist group) prisoners. At the end of the following season, a 3–1 victory for Real Madrid over Athletic Bilbao won them the Spanish title for the 29th time, with the added significance that a defeat would have handed the championship to Athletic's local rivals Real Sociedad.

There is no doubt who has the upper hand in their meetings: in 2004–05 Athletic won home and away against Real Madrid, but won just two of their home matches in the dozen seasons up to 2016–17, and took no points at all from the 12 matches at the Bernabéu with Real Madrid registering four or five goals on several occasions; the Merengues also won both legs of the cup tie between the sides in 2006 (they would not be paired again for 15 years).

In April 2011, Real Madrid registered a 3–0 away win over Athletic despite resting several players for important upcoming games, and in the same fixture in May 2012 they achieved the same result and scoreline to clinch their 32nd title in Bilbao, becoming the first visiting team to win the league in the city. Cristiano Ronaldo scored in both matches, and he is Real Madrid's top goalscorer in the fixture, having overtaken Raúl's tally of 15 in 2016. Both Ronaldo and Athletic's Zarra have 17 league goals in the fixture, but Zarra is still some way ahead overall with 24.

The clubs' first meeting in the Supercopa de España was in 2020–21, when Athletic Bilbao defeated La Liga title holders Real Madrid in the semi-final and went on to win the trophy. The outcome was reversed the following season, as Madrid won the 2022 final 2–0 in Saudi Arabia – the first time the two teams had met to directly compete for a trophy since the 1958 Copa del Generalísimo Final. Two weeks after that, Athletic eliminated Real Madrid from the 2021–22 Copa del Rey at the quarter-final stage in their first meeting in the competition since 2006.

== Head-to-head statistics ==
As of 23 May 2026

| Competition | Pld | ATH | D | RM | ATG | RMG |
|---|---|---|---|---|---|---|
| La Liga | 190 | 52 | 37 | 101 (Note: Real Madrid have won more league matches at Athletic's stadium than any other club (37, as of season 2025–26)) | 247 | 376 |
| Copa del Rey (Note: Does not include two matches in the 1907 Copa del Rey in which Athletic competed as part of Club Biscaya (Biscaya 3–2 Madrid and Madrid 1–0 Biscaya)) | 56 | 24 | 8 | 24 | 83 | 89 |
| Supercopa de España | 2 | 1 | 0 | 1 | 2 | 3 |
| Total in official games (Note: The clubs have never met in UEFA or other international competitions, nor in the defunct Copa Eva Duarte or Copa de la Liga.) (Note: The totals do not include two fixtures played in the Champions Tournament of 1927–28 (Athletic 4–0 Real Madrid and Real Madrid 3–0 Athletic), part of the Liga Española de Football, a predecessor of the Spanish league which was never completed. Athletic Bilbao's archive lists the matches in the competition as friendlies.) | 248 | 77 | 45 | 126 | 332 | 468 |

=== Head-to-head ranking in La Liga (1929–2026) ===
| P. | 29 | 30 | 31 | 32 | 33 | 34 | 35 | 36 | 40 | 41 | 42 | 43 | 44 | 45 | 46 | 47 | 48 | 49 | 50 | 51 | 52 | 53 | 54 | 55 | 56 | 57 | 58 | 59 | 60 | 61 | 62 | 63 | 64 | 65 | 66 | 67 | 68 | 69 | 70 | 71 | 72 | 73 | 74 | 75 | 76 | 77 | 78 | 79 | 80 | 81 | 82 | 83 | 84 | 85 | 86 | 87 | 88 | 89 | 90 | 91 | 92 | 93 | 94 | 95 | 96 | 97 | 98 | 99 | 00 | 01 | 02 | 03 | 04 | 05 | 06 | 07 | 08 | 09 | 10 | 11 | 12 | 13 | 14 | 15 | 16 | 17 | 18 | 19 | 20 | 21 | 22 | 23 | 24 | 25 | 26 |
|---|---|---|---|---|---|---|---|---|---|---|---|---|---|---|---|---|---|---|---|---|---|---|---|---|---|---|---|---|---|---|---|---|---|---|---|---|---|---|---|---|---|---|---|---|---|---|---|---|---|---|---|---|---|---|---|---|---|---|---|---|---|---|---|---|---|---|---|---|---|---|---|---|---|---|---|---|---|---|---|---|---|---|---|---|---|---|---|---|---|---|---|---|---|---|---|
| 1 | | 1 | 1 | 1 | 1 | 1 | | 1 | | | | 1 | | | | | | | | | | | 1 | 1 | 1 | 1 | 1 | | | 1 | 1 | 1 | 1 | 1 | | 1 | 1 | 1 | | | 1 | | | 1 | 1 | | 1 | 1 | 1 | | | 1 | 1 | | 1 | 1 | 1 | 1 | 1 | | | | | 1 | | 1 | | | | 1 | | 1 | | | | 1 | 1 | | | | 1 | | | | | 1 | | | 1 | | 1 | | 1 | | |
| 2 | 2 | | | 2 | 2 | 2 | 2 | 2 | | 2 | 2 | | | 2 | | 2 | | | | | 2 | | | | | | | 2 | 2 | | | | | | 2 | | | | 2 | | | | | | | | | | | 2 | | 2 | 2 | | | | | | | | 2 | 2 | | | | | 2 | 2 | | | | | | 2 | 2 | | | 2 | 2 | 2 | | 2 | | 2 | 2 | | | | | 2 | | 2 | | 2 | 2 |
| 3 | 3 | | | | | | | | 3 | | | | | | 3 | | | 3 | | | 3 | 3 | | 3 | 3 | | | 3 | 3 | | | | | | | | | | | | | | | | | 3 | 3 | | | | 3 | | | 3 | 3 | | | | | 3 | | | | | | | | | | | 3 | | | | | | | | | | | | 3 | | | | 3 | 3 | | | | | | | |
| 4 | | | | | | | 4 | | 4 | | | | | | 4 | | | | 4 | | | | | | | 4 | | | | | | | | | | | | | | 4 | | 4 | | | | | | | | | 4 | | | | | | 4 | | | | | | 4 | | | | 4 | | | | | | 4 | | | | | | | | | | 4 | | | | | | | | | | | 4 | |
| 5 | | 5 | | | | | | | | | | | | | | | | | | | | | | | | | | | | | 5 | | | | 5 | | | | | 5 | | | 5 | | 5 | | | | | | | | | 5 | | | | | | | | | 5 | | | | | | 5 | | | | 5 | | | | | | | | | | | | 5 | | | | | | | | 5 | | |
| 6 | | | 6 | | | | | | | 6 | | | | 6 | | | 6 | 6 | 6 | | | 6 | 6 | | | | 6 | | | | | | | | | | | | 6 | | | | | | | | | | | | | | | | | | | | | | | | | | 6 | 6 | | | | | | | | | | | | | | 6 | | | | | | | | | | | | | | | |
| 7 | | | | | | | | | | | 7 | | 7 | | | 7 | | | | 7 | | | | | | | | | | 7 | | | | 7 | | 7 | 7 | | | | | | | | | | | | 7 | | | | | | | | | 7 | | | | | | | | | | | | | | 7 | | | | | | | | | | | | 7 | | 7 | | | | | | | | | |
| 8 | | | | | | | | | | | | | | | | | | | | | | | | | | | | | | | | | 8 | | | | | | | | | | 8 | | | | | | | | | | | | | | | | | | | 8 | | 8 | | | | 8 | | | | | | | | | | | 8 | | | | | | | | | 8 | | | 8 | 8 | | | |
| 9 | | | | | | | | | | | | | | | | | | | | 9 | | | | | | | | | | | | | | | | | | | | | 9 | 9 | | | | 9 | | 9 | | 9 | | | | | | | | | | | | | | | | | | | | | 9 | | | 9 | | | | | | | | | | | | | | | | | | | | | |
| 10 | | | | | | | | | | | | 10 | 10 | | | | | | | | | | | | | | | | | | | 10 | | | | | | | | | | | | 10 | | | | | | | | | | | | | | | | | | | | | | | | | | | | | | | | | | | | | 10 | | | | | | | | | 10 | | | | | |
| 11 | | | | | | | | | | | | | | | | | 11 | | | | | | | | | | | | | | | | | | | | | 11 | | | | | | | | | | | | | | | | | | | | | | | | | | | | | | | 11 | | | | | | | | 11 | | | | | | | | | | | | 11 | | | | | | |
| 12 | | | | | | | | | | | | | | | | | | | | | | | | | | | | | | | | | | | | | | | | | | | | | | | | | | | | | | | | | | | 12 | 12 | | | | | | | | | | 12 | | | | | 12 | | | | | | | 12 | | | | | | | | | | | | | 12 |
| 13 | | | | | | | | | | | | | | | | | | | | | | | | | | | | | | | | | | | | | | | | | | | | | | | | | | | | | | | | 13 | | | | | | | | | | | | | | | | | | | | | | 13 | | | | | | | | | | | | | | | | | |
| 14 | | | | | | | | | | | | | | | | | | | | | | | | | | | | | | | | | | | | | | | | | | | | | | | | | | | | | | | | | | | | | 14 | | | | | | | | | | | | | | | | | | | | | | | | | | | | | | | | | | |
| 15 | | | | | | | | | | | | | | | | | | | | | | | | | | | | | | | | | | | | | | | | | | | | | | | | | | | | | | | | | | | | | | | | | 15 | | | | | | | | | | | | | | | | | | | | | | | | | | | | | | |
| 16 | | | | | | | | | | | | | | | | | | | | | | | | | | | | | | | | | | | | | | | | | | | | | | | | | | | | | | | | | | | | | | | | | | | | | | | | | | | | | | | | | | | | | | | 16 | | | | | | | | |
| 17 | | | | | | | | | | | | | | | | | | | | | | | | | | | | | | | | | | | | | | | | | | | | | | | | | | | | | | | | | | | | | | | | | | | | | | | | | | | | 17 | | | | | | | | | | | | | | | | | | | |
| 18 | | | | | | | | | | | | | | | | | | | | | | | | | | | | | | | | | | | | | | | | | | | | | | | | | | | | | | | | | | | | | | | | | | | | | | | | | | | | | | | | | | | | | | | | | | | | | | | |
| 19 | | | | | | | | | | | | | | | | | | | | | | | | | | | | | | | | | | | | | | | | | | | | | | | | | | | | | | | | | | | | | | | | | | | | | | | | | | | | | | | | | | | | | | | | | | | | | | | |
| 20 | | | | | | | | | | | | | | | | | | | | | | | | | | | | | | | | | | | | | | | | | | | | | | | | | | | | | | | | | | | | | | | | | | | | | | | | | | | | | | | | | | | | | | | | | | | | | | | |
| 21 | | | | | | | | | | | | | | | | | | | | | | | | | | | | | | | | | | | | | | | | | | | | | | | | | | | | | | | | | | | | | | | | | | | | | | | | | | | | | | | | | | | | | | | | | | | | | | | |
| 22 | | | | | | | | | | | | | | | | | | | | | | | | | | | | | | | | | | | | | | | | | | | | | | | | | | | | | | | | | | | | | | | | | | | | | | | | | | | | | | | | | | | | | | | | | | | | | | | |

• Total: Athletic Bilbao with 20 higher finishes, Real Madrid with 75 higher finishes (as of the end of the 2025–26 season).

== Notable results ==
=== Highest scoring games ===
9 goals:

- Real Madrid 3–6 Athletic Bilbao, January 1947, La Liga
- Real Madrid 8–1 Athletic Bilbao, June 1960, Copa del Generalísimo semi-final

8 goals:

- Athletic Bilbao 6–2 Real Madrid, March 1950, La Liga
- Real Madrid 7–1 Athletic Bilbao, September 1980, La Liga

7 goals:

- Real Madrid 5–2 Athletic Bilbao, March 1935, La Liga
- Athletic Bilbao 2–5 Real Madrid, November 1950, La Liga
- Athletic Bilbao 2–5 Real Madrid, March 2009, La Liga

=== Biggest wins ===
7 goal margin:

- Real Madrid 8–1 Athletic Bilbao, June 1960, Copa del Generalísimo semi-final

6 goal margin:

- Real Madrid 0–6 Athletic Bilbao, January 1931, La Liga
- Real Madrid 6–0 Athletic Bilbao, November 1957, La Liga
- Real Madrid 7–1 Athletic Bilbao, September 1980, La Liga

5 goal margin:

- Athletic Bilbao 5–0 Real Madrid, April 1923, Copa del Rey
- Athletic Bilbao 5–0 Real Madrid, February 1970, La Liga
- Real Madrid 5–0 Athletic Bilbao, March 1988, La Liga
- Real Madrid 5–0 Athletic Bilbao, February 1992, La Liga
- Athletic Bilbao 0–5 Real Madrid, January 1996, La Liga
- Real Madrid 5–0 Athletic Bilbao, October 2014, La Liga

== Personnel at both clubs ==
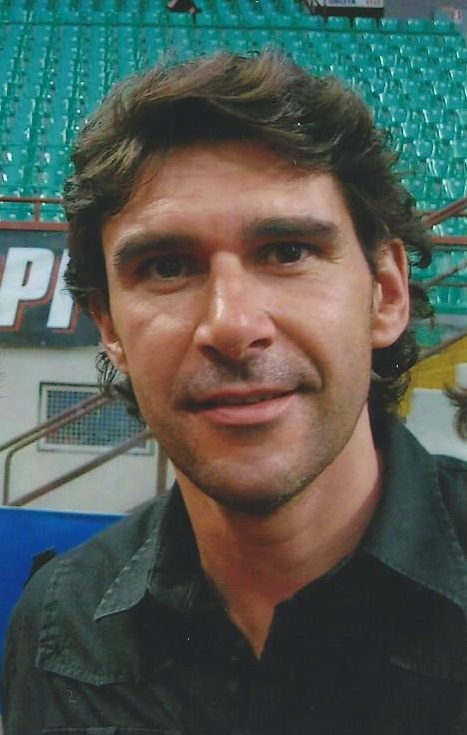
Aitor Karanka played for both clubs

=== Players ===
Over their long histories, just a few footballers have played for both clubs. Most of them are Basques, due to Athletic's policy:

- Ramón de Cárdenas
- André Didisheim
- Julián Ruete
- Luis Saura
- Luis Bergareche
- Juan Urquizu
- Luis María Uribe
- Hermenegildo Elices
- Macala
- Antonio Ortiz Alonso
- Manolín
- Mikel Lasa
- Rafael Alkorta
- Aitor Karanka
- Kepa Arrizabalaga

Madrid-born Ramón de Cárdenas was among the players of Madrid FC's first-ever complete season in 1902–03, but he later established himself in the first years of neighbours Atlético Madrid, then a branch of Athletic - which supplied some players for the parent club for the 1907 Copa del Rey final, Cárdenas' only match for Athletic.

Swissman André Didisheim had his name spelled as "Didixien" for many years in the Spanish press, until its origin was determined in 2022. Didisheim also did play just once for Athletic, in 1909, prior to the club's signing policy become restrict by 1911. Ruete, who was Madrid-born, Didisheim and Saura were all Real Madrid players who were sent to play for Athletic against Club Ciclista de San Sebastián in initial stages of 1909 Copa del Rey. The early elimination prevented them to play more matches. Ruete only played for Madrid's reserve team and later became member of Atlético while this team was still Athletic's branch in Madrid.

The careers of Alkorta and Karanka closely mirrored one another: both central defenders, each started at Athletic then had a successful spell at Real Madrid before returning to Bilbao, with Karanka – five years younger – actually replacing Alkorta at every turn.

The last player to play for both clubs was Kepa Arrizabalaga. Kepa is a product of Athletic's famous youth academy Lezama. He worked his way through the ranks and eventually became the starting goalkeeper for the first team where he played 54 official matches over two seasons. On 22 January 2018, he signed a long-term contract with Athletic with an €80 million buyout clause to stop interest from Real Madrid. However, in August 2018, English club Chelsea paid that €80 million fee making Kepa the most expensive goalkeeper in football history, a record that still stands today. On 14 August 2023, Kepa joined Real Madrid from Chelsea on a straight one-year loan with no option to buy. This was because Real Madrid's starting goalkeeper, Thibaut Courtois, tore his ACL right before the season started. Kepa returned to Chelsea at the end of the season having played twenty matches for Real Madrid and winning the La Liga, Supercopa de España and UEFA Champions League titles.

Ismael Urzaiz, who played over 400 matches for Athletic, started his career at Real Madrid's La Fábrica academy in 1989 but did not make a league appearance for the first team. Decades earlier, others were contracted to both clubs but only appeared in La Liga for one, including José Mandaluniz (who only played official matches for Athletic Bilbao), Francisco Eguía (who only played official matches for Real Madrid), José Ramón Ochandiano (who only played official matches for Athletic Bilbao), and Gregorio Tellado (who only played official matches for Real Madrid).

| From Athletic to Real Madrid | 5 |
| From Athletic to another club before Real Madrid | 8 |
| Total | 13 |
| From Real Madrid to Athletic | 7 |
| From Real Madrid to another club before Athletic | 1 |
| Total | 8 |
| Total Switches | 21 |

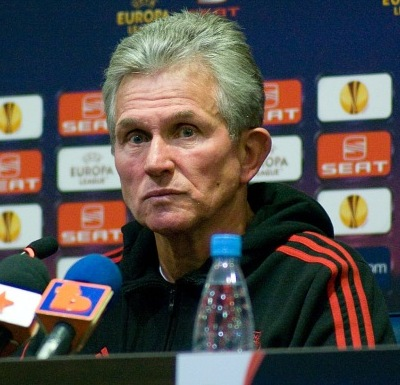
Jupp Heynckes managed both clubs

=== Managers ===
Five coaches have been at the helm of both clubs:

- Lippo Hertzka
- Antonio Barrios
- Baltasar Albéniz
- Juan Antonio Ipiña
- Jupp Heynckes

The early Madrid player and manager Arthur Johnson is also named by some sources as being manager of Athletic Bilbao, but the club does not include him in the list on their website. Also, in July 2010 Aitor Karanka was appointed assistant manager at Real Madrid by manager José Mourinho.

== See also ==
- Athletic–Barcelona clásico
- Basque derby
- El Clásico
- Madrid derby
- National and regional identity in Spain
- Nationalism and sport
