= Mandaluniz =

Mandaluniz or Mandalúniz is a Spanish surname. Notable people with the surname include:

- Angel Santiago Colón de Mandalúniz, Duke of La Vega
- José Mandaluniz (1910 – 15 May 1973), Spanish footballer and manager
- Javier Mandaluniz (born 1987), Spanish footballer
- Julián Mandalúniz, Mayor of Getxo in 1872
