= Bergareche =

Bergareche is a Spanish surname. Notable people with the surname include:

- Jacobo Bergareche (born 1976), Spanish writer
- Luis Bergareche (1910–1994), Spanish businessman and footballer
- Isabel Rodríguez Bergareche (born 1975), former Spanish rugby union player
- Marisa Arrúe Bergareche (born 1949), Spanish politician
