= José Echevarría =

José Echevarría may refer to:

- José Lloréns Echevarría (1843–1920), Mayor of Ponce, Puerto Rico
- José María Echevarría (1920–1966), Spanish footballer

== See also ==
- José Antonio Echeverría (1932–1957), a prominent Cuban figure in the Cuban Revolution
