= Francisco Gárate =

Spanish footballer (1907–1986)

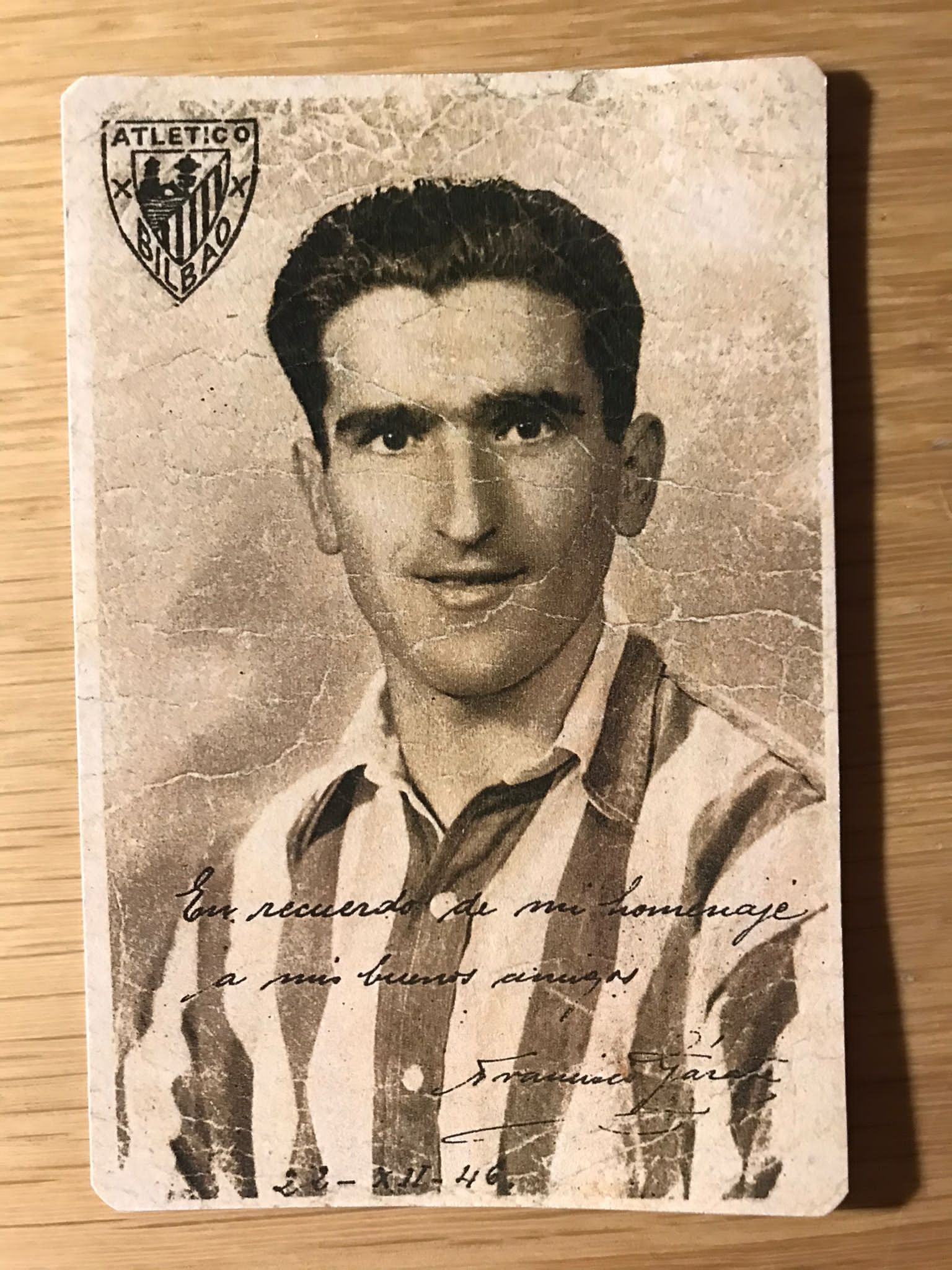

Personal information
- Full name: Francisco Gárate Bergareche
- Birth name: Francisco Garate Bergaretxe
- Date of birth: 11 January 1907
- Place of birth: Durango, Spain
- Date of death: 25 September 1986 (aged 79)
- Place of death: Durango, Spain
- Position: Forward

Senior career*
Years	Team	Apps	(Gls)
1934	Cultural Durango		
1934–1936	Athletic Bilbao	20	(8)
1938–1939	Deportivo Alavés		
1939–1946	Athletic Bilbao	84	(37)
1947–1948	Cultural Durango		
Total		104	(45)

Managerial career
- 1948–1949: Barakaldo
- * Club domestic league appearances and goals

Francisco Gárate Bergareche (11 January 1907 – 27 September 1986) was a Spanish footballer who played as a forward for Athletic Bilbao in the early 1940s.

== Playing career ==
Born in the Biscayan town of Durango on 11 January 1907, Gárate began his career at his hometown club Cultural Durango in 1934, aged 17. He was soon signed by Athletic Bilbao, making his official debut with the first team on 21 October 1934, in a Biscay Championship match against Arenas de Getxo, helping his side to a 5–2 win. Together with Bata, Hermenegildo Elices, and Guillermo Gorostiza, he played a crucial role in the Bilbao team that won the 1935–36 La Liga, scoring 8 goals in 20 La Liga matches. His career was then interrupted by the outbreak of the Spanish Civil War, in which he joined the Naval, where he briefly played for Deportivo Alavés in the 1938–39 season, as well as one friendly for Barcelona against Espanyol on 11 July 1939.

In 1939, Gárate returned to Athletic Bilbao, helping his side win the 1942–43 La Liga, and a three-peat of Copa del Rey titles between 1943 and 1945, although he only started in the latter final, helping his side to a 3–2 victory over Valencia. In total, he scored 57 goals in 135 official matches for Athletic, including 45 goals in 104 La Liga matches.

Having married in August 1943, Gárate also enjoyed hunting, but he ended up contracting tuberculosis after getting soaked during a storm, which forced him to retire. He managed to recover, however, announcing his return in September 1944, and playing with Athletic for a further two years, until 1946. Later that year, on 22 December, Athletic organized a friendly at the San Mamés to benefit both Gárate and José María Echevarría, a fellow Athletic who had also been struggling with tuberculosis, but the match ultimately did not took place. The following year, however, on 22 June 1947, he was the subject of a tribute match held at the San Fausto field in Durango. During the 1947–48 season, he played 10 matches in the Tercera División with Cultural Durango.

== Managerial career ==
After retiring, Gárate briefly worked as a manager, leading Barakaldo in the 1948–49 season.

== Death ==
Gárate died in Durango on 27 September 1986, at the age of 79.

== Honours ==
Athletic Bilbao

- La Liga:
  - Champions (2): 1935–36 and 1942–43
- Copa del Rey:
  - Champions (3): 1943, 1944, and 1945
- Biscay Championship:
  - Champions (2): 1934–35 and 1939–40
