= Antonio Vega de Seoane =

Spanish athlete, sports leader, businessman, and politician

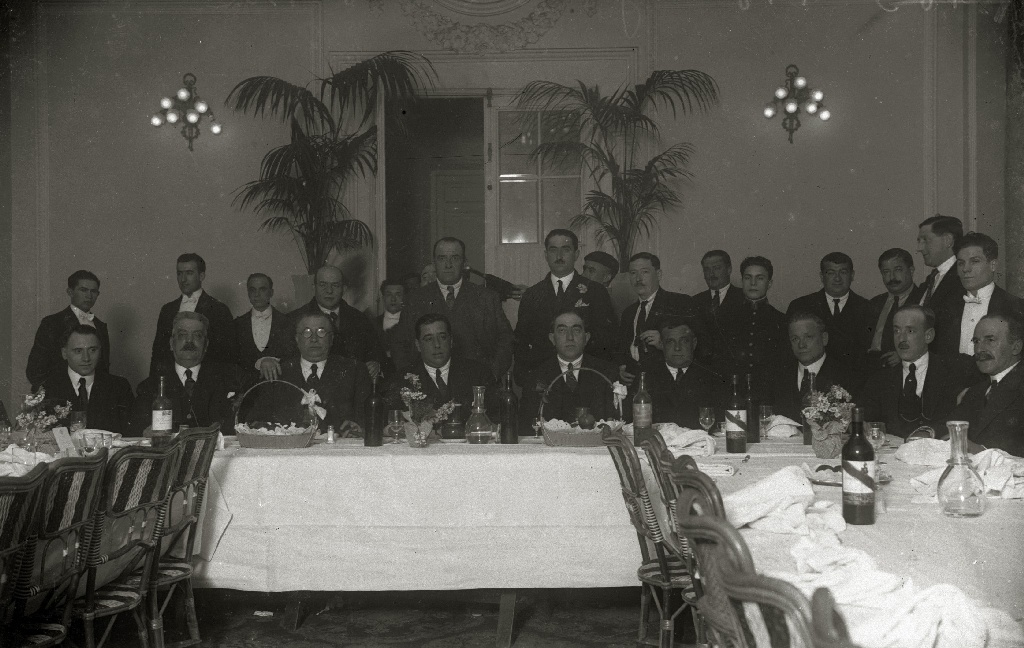
- Antonio Vega de Seoane as the mayor of San Sebastián
- Born: Antonio Vega de Seoane Echeverría; 7 January 1887; San Sebastián, Basque Country, Spain
- Died: 8 May 1943 (aged 56); San Sebastián, Basque Country, Spain
- Resting place: Poblenou Cemetery
- Citizenship: Spanish
- Occupations: Mining engineer; Athlete; Sports leader; Businessman; Politician
- Known for: Mayor of San Sebastián and president of the Real Sociedad
Association football career
- Position(s): Forward
Senior career*
Years	Team	Apps	(Gls)
1904–1905	San Sebastián RC		
1905–1909	Atlético Madrid		
1909	Athletic Club		
Mayor of San Sebastián
In office 1 October 1923 – 22 March 1924
Preceded by	Felipe Azkona
Succeeded by	Juan José Prado
3rd president of the Real Sociedad
In office 1915–1917
Preceded by	Enrique Pardiñas
Succeeded by	Xabier Peña
9th president of the Real Sociedad
In office 1924–1927
Preceded by	Ramón Machimbarrena
Succeeded by	Luis Pradera
- * Club domestic league appearances and goals

Antonio Vega de Seoane Echeverría (7 January 1887 – 8 May 1943) was a Spanish mining engineer, businessman, and politician who served as a mayor of San Sebastián during the dictatorship of Primo de Rivera. In his youth, he played tennis and football for Atlético Madrid and Athletic Bilbao, and then served as the president of Real Sociedad twice.

== Early and personal life ==
Antonio Vega de Seoane was born on 7 January 1887 in San Sebastián, as the son of Baldomero Vega de Seoane, who was a military man and politician who served as a Deputy for Pego, Alicante.

In 1912, Vega de Seoane married Emilia Barroso, daughter of the influential liberal politician Antonio Barroso Castillo, who was a minister in several cabinets between 1906 and 1916. The couple had three children Antonio María, Eduardo, and Gonzalo. His first-born Antonio Vega de Seoane Barroso was also a mayor of San Sebastián and president of Real Sociedad.

== Sporting career ==
In 1904, Vega de Seoane was among the founding members of San Sebastián Recreation Club, which was the very first football club in San Sebastián, and together with Alfonso Sena and Juan Arzuaga, he was then part of the Recreation Club side that played in the 1905 Copa del Rey. At the end of the season, he moved to Madrid to study mining engineering at the Escuela Superior de Minas, and just like so many other students from that school, including Ricardo de Gondra and Raimundo Moreno (Pichichi's brother), he began playing football in the ranks of Athletic Club de Madrid. On 20 February 1907, Vega de Seoane appears in the club's board of directors chaired by Ricardo de Gondra as the first captain of the tennis section, with Fernando Asuero as the second captain.

His outstanding performances at the club led him to be loaned to Atlético's subsidiary, Athletic Bilbao, specifically for the 1909 Copa del Rey, where he played alongside the likes of Luis Saura del Pan, Julián Ruete, and André Didisheim as Bilbao were knocked out in the first round by Club Ciclista of San Sebastián.

When he returned to his hometown, Vega de Seoane was elected as the third president of Real Sociedad in 1915, a position that he held for two years until 1917, when he was replaced by Xabier Peña, but then served a second mandate between 1924 and 1927, when he already was the mayor of San Sebastián.

== Professional career ==
As a Mining Engineer, Vega de Seoane practiced his profession in countless Spanish exploitations, and was also in charge of the Gipuzkoa fishing owners, creating various modern industries in Pasaia. He was president of the Spanish Federation of Fishing Owners and of the Asociación de Armadores y Ezportadores. His multiple industrial activities and his relevant performance in the cultural media earned him numerous relationships.

== Politic career ==
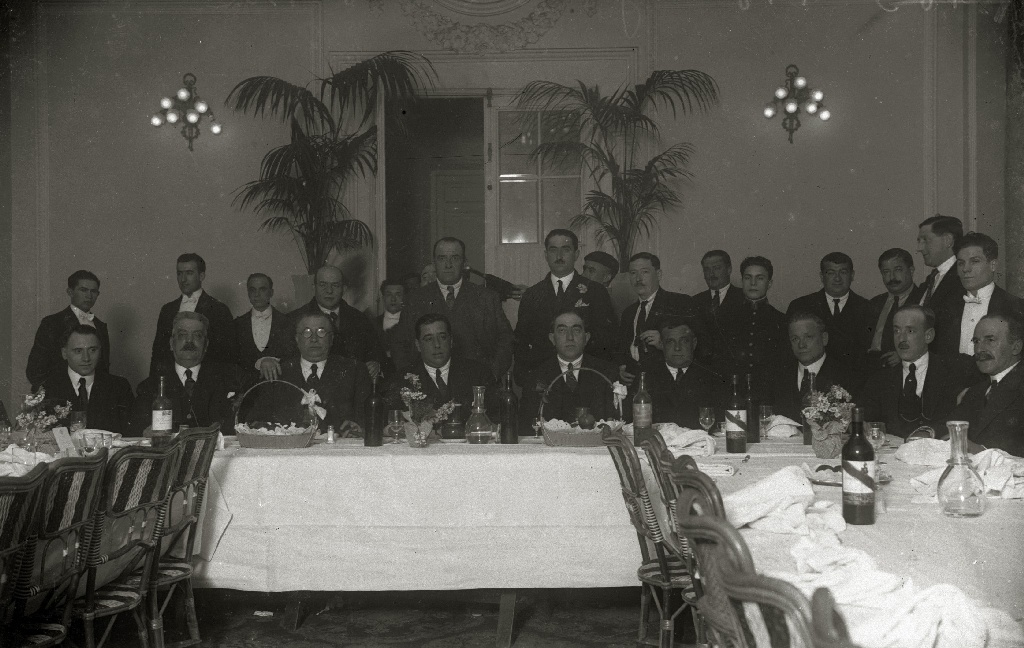
The mayor of San Sebastián, Antonio Vega de Seoane, with a group of men in a hotel establishment.

He was mayor of the city of San Sebastián from 1 October 1923 until 22 March of the following year, thus becoming the first mayor of San Sebastián appointed by the government of the dictator Miguel Primo de Rivera. On 21 December 1923, he baptized the Orfeón de la Chestnut ahead of its performance that brought together a group of friends from the Gaztelupe Society, which did not have a piano, hence rehearsing the performance at the Círculo Tradicionalista, on the first floor of Calle Mayor.

He resigned a few months after exercising his mandate, dissatisfied with the government of Primo de Rivera, but in the following years, he continued to be connected with municipal politics.

== Death ==
Vega de Seoane died on 8 May 1943 in San Sebastián, at the age of 56. His mortal remains were buried in the Poblenou Cemetery and the funeral ceremonies were held in the parish church of Santa María, constituted two major stages of mourning.
