= Evaristo San Miguel =

Evaristo San Miguel may refer to:

- Evaristo Fernández de San Miguel (1785–1862), Spanish soldier, politician, and writer
- Evaristo San Miguel (footballer) (1909–1990), Spanish footballer
