= José María Echevarría =

Spanish footballer and manager

Personal information
- Full name: José María Echevarría Ayestarán
- Date of birth: 30 October 1920
- Place of birth: Getxo, Biscay, Spain
- Date of death: 25 March 1966 (aged 45)
- Place of death: Leza, Álava, Spain
- Position: Goalkeeper

Youth career
- 1930–1934: San Ignacio school team

Senior career*
Years	Team	Apps	(Gls)
1934–1936	San Ignacio Catholic; Action team		
1937	SEU de Getxo		
1938–1939	Bilbao Athletic		
1939–1943	Athletic Bilbao	59	(0)

International career
1942	Spain	1	(0)
- * Club domestic league appearances and goals

José María Echevarría Ayestarán (30 October 1920 – 25 March 1966) was a Spanish footballer who played as a goalkeeper for Athletic Bilbao and Spain in the early 1940s. Echevarría was one of Athletic's most important players in the post-Civil War period in which the club was rebuilding its squad.

== Early life and education ==
José María Echevarría was born on 30 October 1920 in Getxo, Biscay, as the third and only son of the four children of Hilario Echevarría y Goitia (1888–1940), a native of Bermeo, and Eugenia Ayestarán y Arrieta (1894–1950), a native of Algorta. He was baptised in the following week, on 7 November, in the parish church of San Nicolás de Bari, Algorta.

From the age of 6 to 14, Echevarría attended the San Ignacio schools, where he completed his primary education, after which he began studying accounting. He began to play football with his friends at the San Ignacio school, where he gradually developed into a goalkeeper, playing against teams from other schools, such as Lamiako and La Plaza de Algorta, and where he quickly earned the nickname 'Pellejoduro' ("Hard skin") due to his courage and disregard for his physical integrity.

Echevarría grew up as a fan of CD Getxo, founded in 1927, so he regularly attended the Campo Municipal de Fadura to watch the club's first team training sessions, and during the 1934–35 season, the team coach began to allow him to participate, always acting as ball boy or goalkeeper, blocking shots on goal from the likes of Luis Bergareche, who had scored the first-ever La Liga goal for Athletic Bilbao in 1929.

== Playing career ==
=== Early career ===
In 1935, the 15-year-old Echevarría played for the San Ignacio Catholic Action team in a tournament that was contested by several religion-related teams, such as the Catechesis de Santurce, or the Catholic Action teams of Las Arenas and Erandio; he helped his side to a third-place finish after having led until the sixth matchday. He then played in another tournament, which was only contested by teams from Getxo and Leioa, and which used a single-match elimination system, with Echevarría going on to change teams up to eight times, playing the final with Puerto, which he helped to a 4–1 win over Arsenal de la Cadena. In the following year, he once again joined the San Ignacio Catholic Action team, this time in the youth category, but his career there was interrupted by the outbreak of the Spanish Civil War in July.

In November 1937, shortly after Francisco Franco's troops took over Biscay, Athletic Bilbao organized an amateur tournament that was only open to local teams composed of players aged between 15 and 19, as a means to showcase the best young players in the region, so that Athletic could rebuild their squad, which had been hindered by the War. In order to enter the tournament, Echevarría and his friends formed a team named Getxo, but the new municipal authorities did not allow them to register independently and forced them to join the already existing SEU de Guecho team, which they did, although they ended up not wearing its uniform, as they instead wore the one from the San Ignacio Catholic Action team. In the tournament, which was contested by 39 teams, Echevarría helped his side reach the final group stage, where they finished last; despite the result, one journalist from the Bilbao newspaper Hierro described Echevarría as "undoubtedly the best goalkeeper playing in this championship". SEU de Guecho then organized a tournament called Copa del Abra, in which Echevarría played in every match, except for the final.

=== Bilbao AC ===
Like so many other young players who stood out in the tournament, the 17-year-old Echevarría joined Bilbao's youth team, Bilbao Athletic Club, doing so in early 1938, but only at the insistence of his friend and Guecho teammate Valentín Pomposo. He made his debut with Bilbao AC on 29 May, coming on in the second half of a friendly match against Racing de Santander. However, this new young team of Bilbao was quickly broken up as some signed for other clubs, modest or otherwise, while others left due to military service, with Echevarría himself being mobilized in September 1938, but after some weeks in the regiments of Estella and America, both based in Pamplona, he was discharged, which enable him to play several friendlies for Bilbao AC in late 1938, and then in the 1939 Biscay Championship, the first official competition organized by the RFEF since the start of the War, in which Echevarría conceded only 5 goals as Bilbao claimed the title with 15 points.

=== Athletic Bilbao ===
In the following season, Echevarría remained at Bilbao AC due to the arrival of Fernando Llorente, eventually becoming Athletic Bilbao's third-choice goalkeeper behind Llorente, José Antonio Barrie, and Gregorio Leicea, so he had to wait a couple of months to make his official debut for the first team in a La Liga fixture against the eventual champions Atlético Aviación on 18 February 1940; although Bilbao lost 3–1, Echevarría was the team's best player, thus securing his place in the starting eleven. On the last matchday of the league, against Real Madrid on 28 April, Echevarría made such a great performance that he was called up for the Spain national team as a substitute for Pérez.

A few months later, on 16 October 1940, his father, Hilario, died at the age of 52, although his teammates tried to help him with the resounding victory achieved at San Mamés the following day against Real Murcia, with Echevarría himself starting in that match, but only after much insistence, and despite his president and friend Luis Casajuana advising him otherwise. (Note: The death of his father also meant his exclusion from military service.) During that season (1940–41), he was the goalkeeper who conceded the fewest goals in La Liga (21 goals in 18 matches for a ratio of 0.86), thus winning the Ricardo Zamora Trophy.

In the following season, in 1941–42, Echevarría started in all the matches, both in the league and the cup, playing a total of 36 consecutive matches, including the 1942 Copa del Generalísimo final on 21 June, which ended in a 3–4 loss to Barcelona after extra-time. Three months later, on 6 September 1942, in a friendly against Real Oviedo, he fractured his rib in a collision with Antonio Chas, and during the convalescence from his injury, he caught tuberculosis, so even though he was able to play a further three matches for the club in October 1942, the illness soon took its toll, even fainting once in the San Mamés locker room, and therefore, he never again stepped onto the field.

In total, he played 87 official matches for the club, logging 23 clean-sheets and only 124 goals conceded; in La Liga, he played 59 matches.

== International career ==
On 12 January 1941, Echevarría earned his first (and only) international cap in a friendly match against Portugal in Lisbon, coming off the bench in the 38th minute and conceding two goals in an eventual 2–2 draw. He played alongside Bilbao teammate Juan José Mieza and Isaac Oceja.

Echevarría was also selected five times to represent the Biscay team.

== Later life ==
His illness got worse, so the club's doctor, Juan Arróspide Basabe, recommended him to the Tablada sanatorium, where he began his incessant attempts to heal himself, so that he could rejoin the Athletic team, but despite their best efforts, doctors were unable to cure him. In April 1943, while he was hospitalized in Tablada, Athletic was crowned league champions of the 1942–43 La Liga, and thanks to the three matches that he played at the start of the season, he was officially a member of the team's winning squad. His sanatorium was located in Madrid, which hosted the 1943 Copa del Generalísimo final between Madrid and Bilbao, who won the title with a goal from Telmo Zarra; Echevarría watched the game.

== Death ==
Echevarría died in Leza, Álava, on 25 March 1966, at the age of 88.

== Legacy ==
In 1948, the former national coach José María Mateos described him as a "formidable goalkeeper" who had a "short but brilliant career". His teammate Raimundo Lezama later stated that Echevarría's "main qualities were his blocking of the ball, his punching clearance, and the difficult, yet improbable, saves he made".

== Honours ==
Bilbao Athletic

- Biscay Championship
  - Champions (1): 1939

Athletic Bilbao

- La Liga
  - Champions (1): 1942–43
  - Runner-up (1): 1940–41
- Copa del Rey:
  - Runner-up (1): 1942
