= Athletic–Barcelona clásico =

Spanish professional football club rivalry

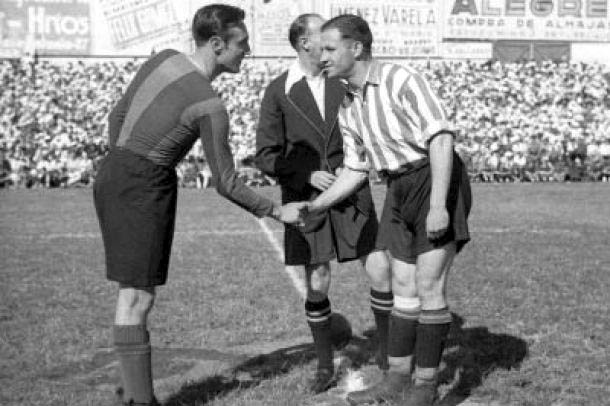
- A 1942 derbi
- Location: Spain
- Teams: Athletic Bilbao; FC Barcelona
- First meeting: 2 May 1920; Copa del Rey; Barcelona 2–0 Athletic Bilbao
- Latest meeting: 27 August 2026; La Liga; Barcelona 2–0 Athletic Bilbao
- Next meeting: 28 February 2027; La Liga; Athletic Bilbao v Barcelona
- Stadiums: San Mamés (Bilbao); Camp Nou (Barcelona)

Statistics
- Total meetings: 247 (official)
- Most wins: Barcelona (128, official)
- Most player appearances: Agustín Gainza (42)
- Top scorer: Lionel Messi (29)
- Largest victory: Athletic Bilbao 12–1 Barcelona; 1931

The Athletic–Barcelona clásico refers to football matches between Athletic Bilbao and FC Barcelona, two clubs competing in Spanish football competitions.

The two clubs are among the oldest in the country, and have participated in every season of the national championship, La Liga. Owing to this, as well as contesting nine finals of the Copa del Rey (in which they are the two most successful clubs), it is the third most-played football fixture in Spain, after the meetings of each with the third constant member of the league, Real Madrid. Due to this, it has been referred to as a Clásico, the modern Spanish term for a significant and traditional fixture (a classic) which is not a derbi based on geographical proximity.

The relationship between Athletic and Barcelona has historically been fairly healthy aside from certain periods when competitiveness became hostility, such as in the early 1980s. By the turn of the 21st century, the rivalry had largely become a historical concept due to the disparity in the fortunes of the clubs and the lack of a local element, but their frequent meetings in matches of importance, including four Copa del Rey finals and three Supercopa fixtures in a dozen seasons, restored some relevancy to the fixture.

== Profile of clubs ==
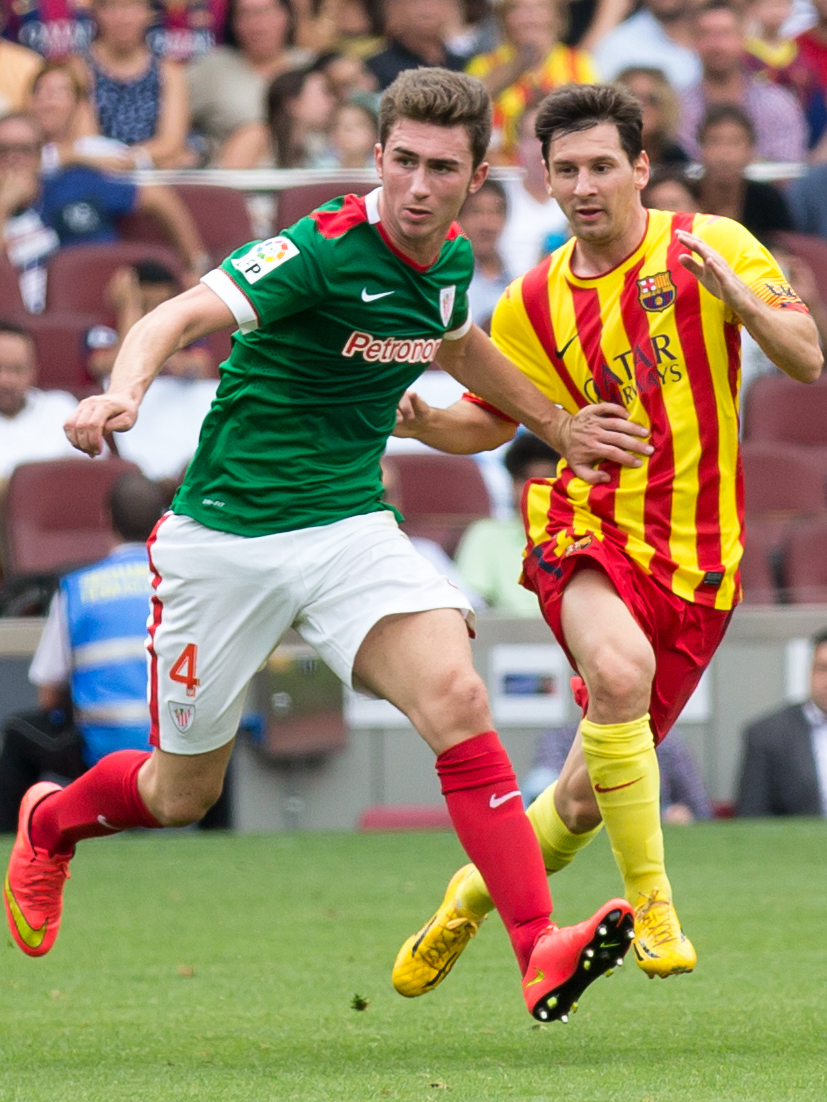
Athletic (left) and Barcelona playing in change kits in the flag colours of their respective Basque and Catalan identities (2014)

Athletic Bilbao and Barcelona are both owned by their socios (members) who elect a president to oversee club affairs. They also place great importance in developing local players through their cantera (youth systems), and were among the last major clubs to adopt a commercial sponsor logo on their jerseys (Athletic doing so in 2008 and Barcelona three years later).

These two clubs are the most successful clubs in their respective regions of the Basque Country and Catalonia, both regions who have more support for separatism than other parts of Spain. As a result, these two clubs tend to identify themselves more so with regional culture than with Spain as a whole, such as with Athletic's adherence to a unique 'Basque only' player policy and Barcelona's self proclaimed commitment to Catalan independence and identity.

Barcelona in particular have a far more intense rivalry with Real Madrid – perceived to represent the dominant Castile region and the Spanish royal family – sometimes known as the Gran Clásico, it has become simply El Clásico; they also contest a local derby in Greater Barcelona against Espanyol which too has political aspects. Athletic Bilbao's attitude towards Real Madrid is also more frosty than their relationship with Barcelona due to the differences in the political and cultural identity of the clubs, and they have a significant local rivalry in the Basque autonomous region with Real Sociedad.

== History ==
The date of the first meeting between the two clubs is a matter of debate. The final of the 1902 Copa de la Coronación was played between Barcelona and Club Biscaya (a combined team of Athletic Club and Bilbao FC, which merged the following year); Biscaya won the match 2–1. Athletic regard themselves as the successor to the Biscaya team and the Copa Coronación as the first edition of the Copa del Rey, including it with later wins in their official honours. However, the Spanish Federation gives 1903 as the commencement date for the Copa del Rey, disregarding the previous year's tournament in its records, so it has never been fully established if they regard Biscaya and Athletic as the same club or not. Barcelona's team in the final also included players from Hispania AC, meaning theirs was also something of a combined force rather than a single club entity.

Athletic and Barcelona were both successful in the early years of the national cup: between 1903 and 1920, the Basques won seven Copas and the Catalans three (including wins for both in the 1910 edition where two competitions were held, both considered official retrospectively), but they did not face each other at any stage of the tournament until their first undisputed meeting in the 1920 Final held in Gijón, which Barcelona won 2–0. In the following edition, Barcelona withdrew in protest after the federation changed the venue of the final to Bilbao, and it was the 'home' club who eventually took the trophy.

Regional qualifying leagues were introduced, and Athletic became the dominant club in the Biscay Championship (from 1913) while Barça were the strongest in the Catalan football championship (its earliest version was held in 1901). In that period, the two clubs introduced measures which led to them becoming important symbols of their respective homelands, Athletic implementing a policy of using only local players in response to being criticised by opponents for selecting too many foreigners, and Barça adopting Catalan as their official language. In that era, matches were played by representative teams from each of the regional leagues, including several fixtures between Catalonia and the Basque Country.

=== La Liga beginnings and Franco era ===
The teams did not meet again prior to the establishment in 1929 of a national professional league championship, La Liga, which would see them face off regularly and become rivals for the title: Barcelona won the first edition but failed to make much impact thereafter, suffering the humiliation of a 12–1 defeat at the hands of Athletic Bilbao in 1931 (Bata scoring seven in what still ranks as the biggest win in the history of the competition) and also losing the 1932 Copa del Rey final to the Lions. Athletic were champions four times in the following seven seasons up to the outbreak of the Spanish Civil War in 1936.

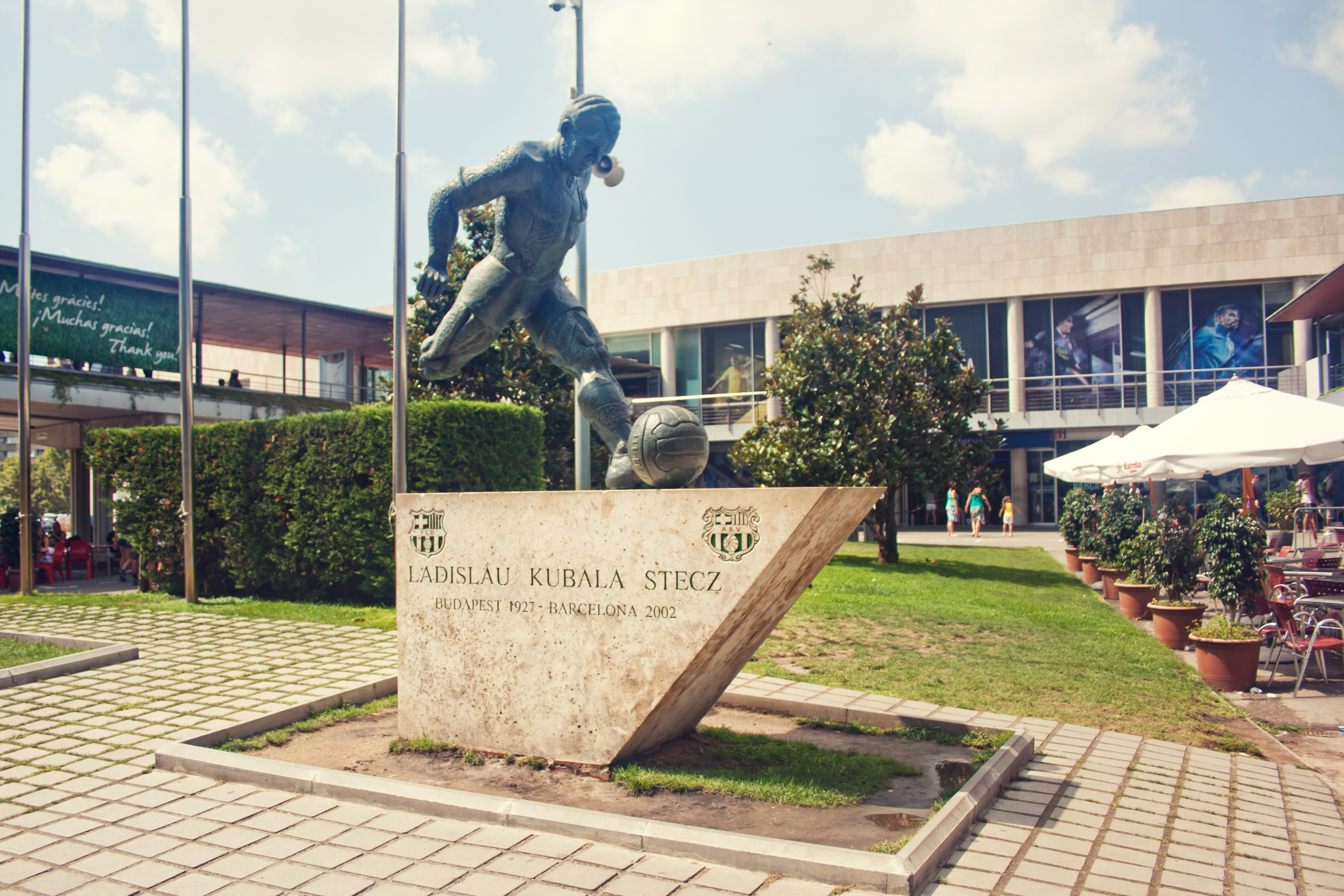
László Kubala had such an impact on Barcelona that his statue now stands outside the club's stadium

In broad terms, Catalonia and most parts of the Basque Country fought on the losing Republican side in the conflict, and the victorious Nationalist regime soon introduced measures against regional languages and cultures. In 1941, football teams with 'foreign names' and symbols were required to amend them to a Spanish equivalent, thus Club de Fútbol Barcelona and Atlético de Bilbao became the official titles of the historic clubs and the Catalan flag was replaced with the Spanish on Barcelona's crest (the short-lived Republic had done the same with Royalist symbols in the previous decade, altering the names of clubs such as Real Madrid and Real Sociedad and removing crowns from their crests). This oppressive centralist atmosphere in society contributed to the clubs becoming even more important to the local populations, the stadium being one of the few places where they could speak their language and express themselves freely. In this regard, the clubs had much in common and meetings between them were akin to an international fixture, with the regional representative teams also having been disbanded.

In the domestic league, the performances of Barcelona and Athletic were comparable until the 1960s, with the Basques winning only two titles during the period from 1939 to 1960 compared to seven for the Catalans, but both finishing near the top of the table most years. Athletic won seven cups to Barcelona's six, although the finals between them in 1942 and 1953 both went the way of the Blaugrana. The Barça coach in the latter match, Ferdinand Daučík, soon took over at Athletic, and won trophies with both clubs.

Daučík had moved to Spain at the same time as his son-in-law and the club's star of the period, the Hungarian László Kubala, who was the first of several foreign imports to make an impact (although the vast majority of players would remain Spanish until much later), winning the league several times plus two Inter-Cities Fairs Cups and a Latin Cup, and enduring a narrow defeat in the 1961 European Cup Final; he suffered a serious knee injury inflicted by Athletic's Eneko Arieta in 1954. During his stay, the club also opened their massive ambitious Camp Nou stadium, the cost of which would weaken the club economically for many years. Real Madrid had moved to a larger ground a few years earlier, and they too signed talent from Eastern Europe and South America as well as from around Spain which propelled them to further domestic and continental success, with the positive international exposure pleasing the regime.

Athletic had a talented forward line in that era, spearheaded by prolific striker Zarra who set multiple goalscoring records including most goals in a season, most overall league goals, most hat-tricks, most goals by an opposition player against Real Madrid, and most goals in the Athletic vs Barcelona fixture. However, just prior to the introduction of regular continental competitions, he and his peers passed their peak, and from that time on the club were unable to consistently compete with their old foes for honours. They continued to use only Basque players, and chose to redevelop their San Mamés stadium rather than constructing a replacement, with much of the funding sourced from the transfer of their defender Jesús Garay to Barcelona in 1960.

=== 1977 UEFA Cup tie ===
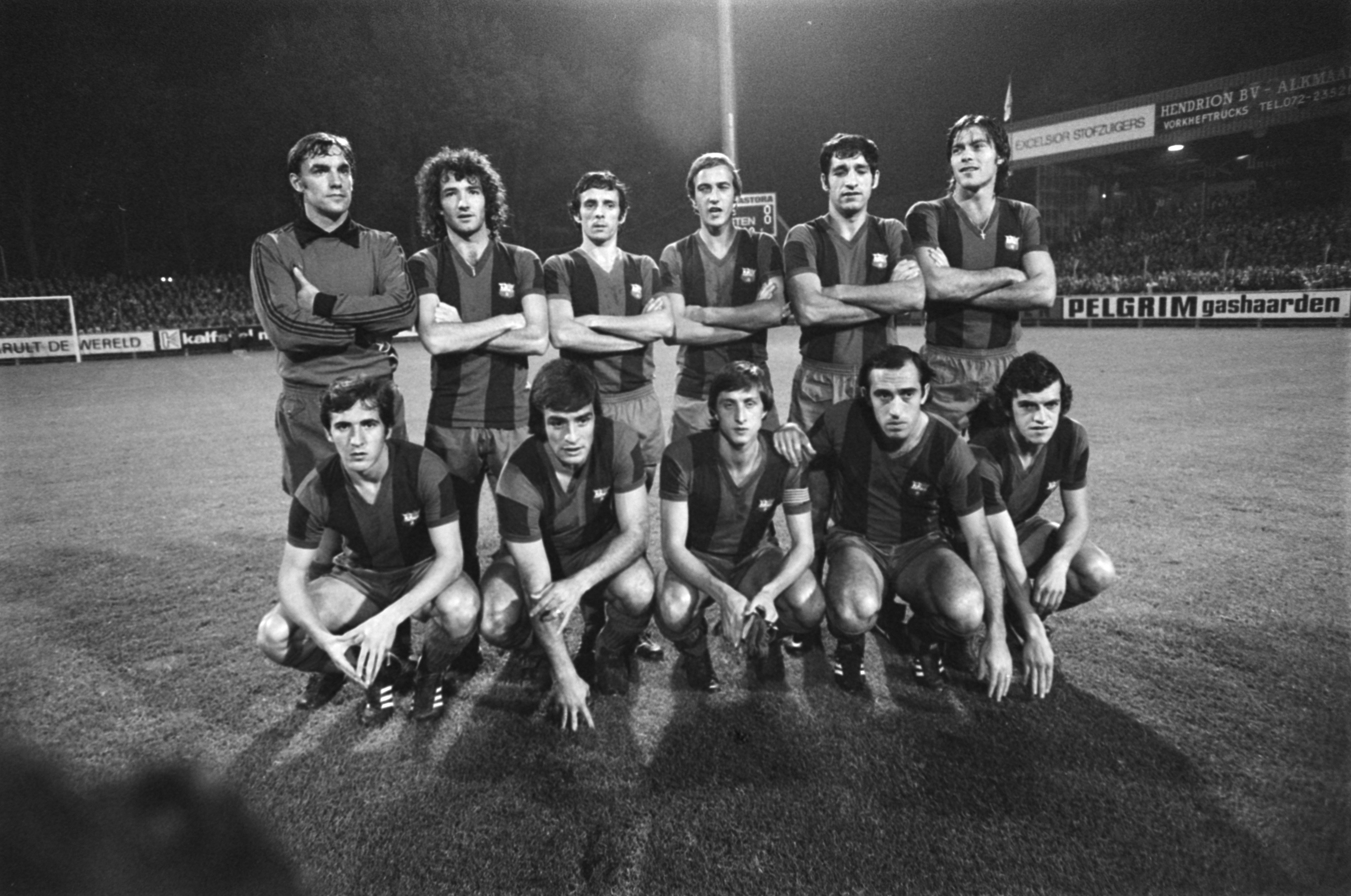
Athletic eliminated Barcelona and Johan Cruyff during their 1976–77 UEFA Cup run

Athletic and Barcelona both took part in the 1976–77 UEFA Cup having won only one league title between them in almost two decades (Barça in 1974), and both eager for glory in Europe. They were drawn together in the quarter-finals; it was the first time Athletic had played another Spanish team in a continental tournament. The two clubs had already played both league fixtures that season, the Catalans winning 3–1 in Bilbao and the Basques claiming a 2–0 victory at the Camp Nou ten days before their UEFA Cup tie. The tie was played in an unusually friendly atmosphere due to the similar regional identity of the two clubs, whose supporters were excited by the prospect of a brighter future for their respective territories after the death of dictator General Franco and the weakening of his regime. By that point, the clubs' original names and identity were restored.

In the tie, Athletic held on for a 2–1 lead at San Mamés and led by the same scoreline by half time in the second leg thanks to a brace of away goals from Javier Irureta, requiring Barça to score three more times in the last 45 minutes. They could only manage one, through Johan Cruyff (their biggest foreign star of the era), so the Lions qualified for the penultimate stage of a European tournament for the first time. They reached the final, but lost to Juventus.

=== Violence in 1983–84 ===
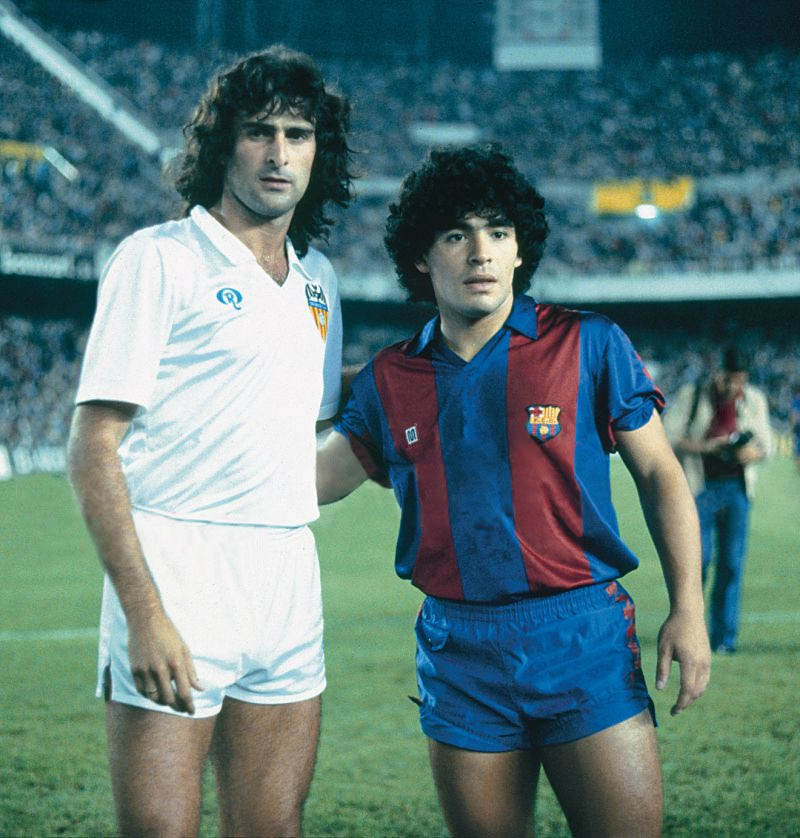
Diego Maradona (right), during his time at Barcelona

==== Background ====
By the early 1980s, Barcelona were becoming desperate for major success. They had still not won La Liga since 1974, and in addition to Real Madrid and Atlético Madrid who usually had talented squads, Real Sociedad from the Basque city of San Sebastián had assembled a strong team composed entirely of local homegrown talent, who finished above Barça in 1979 and continued to improve, being runners-up the following year before winning back-to-back titles in 1981 and 1982, overtaking Barcelona in the closing stages of the latter campaign. The Catalans hired famous coaches Helenio Herrera and Udo Lattek, but were left unsatisfied even with Copa victories in 1978 and 1981 (after overcoming Athletic in the semi-finals) followed by UEFA Cup Winners' Cups in 1979 and 1982. They had paid a world record transfer fee to bring Argentina star Diego Maradona to the club, followed in 1983 by his compatriot and mentor César Luis Menotti as head coach.

However, besides Real Sociedad (who were weakened when midfielder Perico Alonso moved to Barça after their second title), it was also a strong period for Athletic Bilbao, who developed a group of talented but highly aggressive and physical players under coach Javier Clemente. Athletic took the title in 1983 (their first championship for 27 years) just ahead of Real Madrid, while Barcelona defeated their biggest rivals from the capital in the cup final. It was clear that the following season could be a close affair between the three clubs, with the added elements of a clash in style and personality between Menotti and Clemente, who were not afraid of expressing their opinions to the press, and the pervading feeling in Barcelona that their 1982 title bid had been ruined by a serious knee injury to influential midfielder Bernd Schuster sustained in a challenge from Athletic defender Andoni Goikoetxea. Barcelona too had a reputation for 'hard' play which at times could descend into outright violence, and the club had received fines from UEFA for their conduct in recent European matches including the 1982 European Super Cup.

==== Maradona and Goiko ====
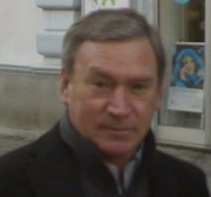
Javier Clemente put together an Athletic side who were noted for their aggressive style

The season would be remembered for two of the most notorious incidents in Spanish football history, amidst a backdrop of serious tension in society, much of it due to terrorism committed by Basque separatists ETA. The league schedule paired Barcelona and Athletic Bilbao at Camp Nou in the fourth round of fixtures in September 1983, and the home side were two goals ahead by the interval; early in the second half, Goikoetxea was angered by a hard tackle from Schuster, prompting Maradona to suggest that he calm down, but a short time later, Maradona dribbled into space in midfield and was tackled crudely from behind by Goikoetxea, who appeared to make little attempt to play the ball and snapped Maradona's ankle. Despite the recklessness of the challenge, Goikoetxea was only cautioned. Barcelona went on to win 4–0, but lost Maradona until January 1984. The Athletic bus was stoned as it left the city. Goikoetxea, from then on frequently referred to as the Butcher of Bilbao after the incident became widely publicised, was given an 18-match ban, soon reduced to nine then six, meaning he returned in November, and his importance to the team was underlined by the fact those were the only league matches he missed all season.

Neither player took part in either leg of the autumn 1983 Supercopa de España between the sides, won 3–2 by Barcelona on aggregate, but both were back in place for the league game at San Mamés in late January, in which Maradona, still recovering from the injury, scored both his team's goals in their 2–1 victory. However, points dropped by the Catalans in other matches meant they were never able to pull ahead of Real Madrid or Athletic, and in one of the tightest finishes in the competition's history, the Basques retained the title by dint of a superior head-to-head record over the Merengues, with both a point ahead of Barcelona in the final table, leading their followers to ponder how many they might have collected with Maradona available and fully fit; had they been level on points with Athletic, they would have finished above them on head-to-head results having beaten them twice.

==== Cup final ====
A week later, the 1984 Copa del Rey Final brought Athletic and Barcelona together at the Santiago Bernabéu Stadium for their fifth meeting of the campaign. In a predictably physical game, Athletic won 1–0 through Endika to clinch the double for the first time since 1956. Upon the final whistle, Maradona (who had been insulted by Clemente in the build-up and was fouled repeatedly during the match, particularly by his marker Iñigo Liceranzu) was goaded by Miguel Sola and reacted by launching a flying kick. Several players from both teams waded in, including Goikoetxea as well as Migueli, Miguel de Andrés, Patxi Salinas, Paco Clos and others, and a chaotic brawl ensued. All the aforementioned were sanctioned, further verbal insults were exchanged by both camps, and Maradona never played for the club again, transferring to Napoli for another world record fee.

==== Aftermath ====
The following campaign brought change for both clubs. At that time, the Supercopa was given automatically to any 'double' winners (rather than meeting the cup runners-up again, as was the case in later eras), thus Athletic were given the 1984 honour and another potentially hostile clash between the sides early in the season was avoided. Barcelona, having replaced Maradona and Menotti with Scottish striker Steve Archibald and English manager Terry Venables, finally won the league title. Athletic reached the cup final again but lost to Atlético Madrid, and they would not reach another for a generation as a gradual decline set in.

The 1986 Copa semi-finals again saw Athletic and Barcelona drawn together, and the second leg at San Mamés (won 2–1 by Barcelona) saw incidents of objects being thrown by the crowd, a pitch invasion and insults made to the referee by Bilbao staff members, resulting in their stadium being closed for the next fixture, the first time this had occurred; however, the hostile environment and disorder resulted largely from anger at the decisions and behaviour of the officials (who appeared to miss a foul during a Barça goal and failed to award a penalty to the home side) rather than hostility towards the opposition.

A month later, Barcelona made it to the 1986 European Cup Final held on Spanish soil, but unexpectedly lost to Steaua București. They had just confirmed the signing of Athletic's goalkeeper Andoni Zubizarreta who would be an important figure in the years to come. Thereafter, both clubs suffered as Real Madrid, led by 'La Quinta del Buitre', won five championships in a row.

=== 1990s ===
By the 1990s, the clubs were no longer competing at the same level of performance. Under Johan Cruyff as coach, Barcelona introduced innovative methods to be used at all levels of the club, which would still be in effect decades later. In addition to four successive league titles, they won another Cup Winners' Cup in 1989 then finally achieved their aim of winning the European Cup in 1992 (defeating Sampdoria on both occasions); the Dream Team built by Cruyff included several Basques, such as Valverde (whose next move was to Bilbao and later coached both clubs), the former Athletic players Alexanko, Zubizarreta and Julio Salinas, and a winger known as Andoni Goikoetxea (a different man from the defender who had injured Maradona). Athletic, who finished above Barcelona only once following their double win – in 1988 – continued to produce some good players, with Julen Guerrero considered the best of the era, but usually had to content themselves with finishing mid-table. In 1991, a Barcelona team containing six Basque players defeated Javier Clemente's Athletic 6–0 in Bilbao, though it was one of the foreign stars who made the difference: Bulgarian Hristo Stoichkov scored four.

Following the 1996 Bosman ruling, the gap widened further; with no limitations on signing players from the European Union, clubs such as Barcelona could and did bring in the best talent from across the continent – their squad in 1999, their centenary season included eight Dutch internationals as well as three Brazilians, an Argentine, a Portuguese and five who had represented Spain. Both clubs competed in the 1998–99 UEFA Champions League group stage after the previous domestic league was won by Barça with Athletic runners-up (in their centenary year), marking their best finish since 1984 which they have not matched since as the league took on an increasingly international profile, becoming the strongest in Europe by the end of the turn of the millennium.

=== 21st century ===
Entering the 21st century, Athletic endured some struggles with relegation while Barcelona also had a relatively disappointing period but then recovered and continued to grow increasingly more rich, popular and successful, attracting several of the world's top players and drawing among the biggest crowds in Europe to their stadium. Under Frank Rijkaard, Barcelona won the Champions League in 2006 while also developing a highly talented group from their Cruyff-inspired youth system who would lead them to even greater success including three more continental titles, led by forward Lionel Messi, who broke virtually all of Zarra's longstanding records. At international level, the revived Basque and Catalan representative teams (described as State of Origin squads) met four times between 2006 and 2015, with several Barcelona and Athletic players involved each time.

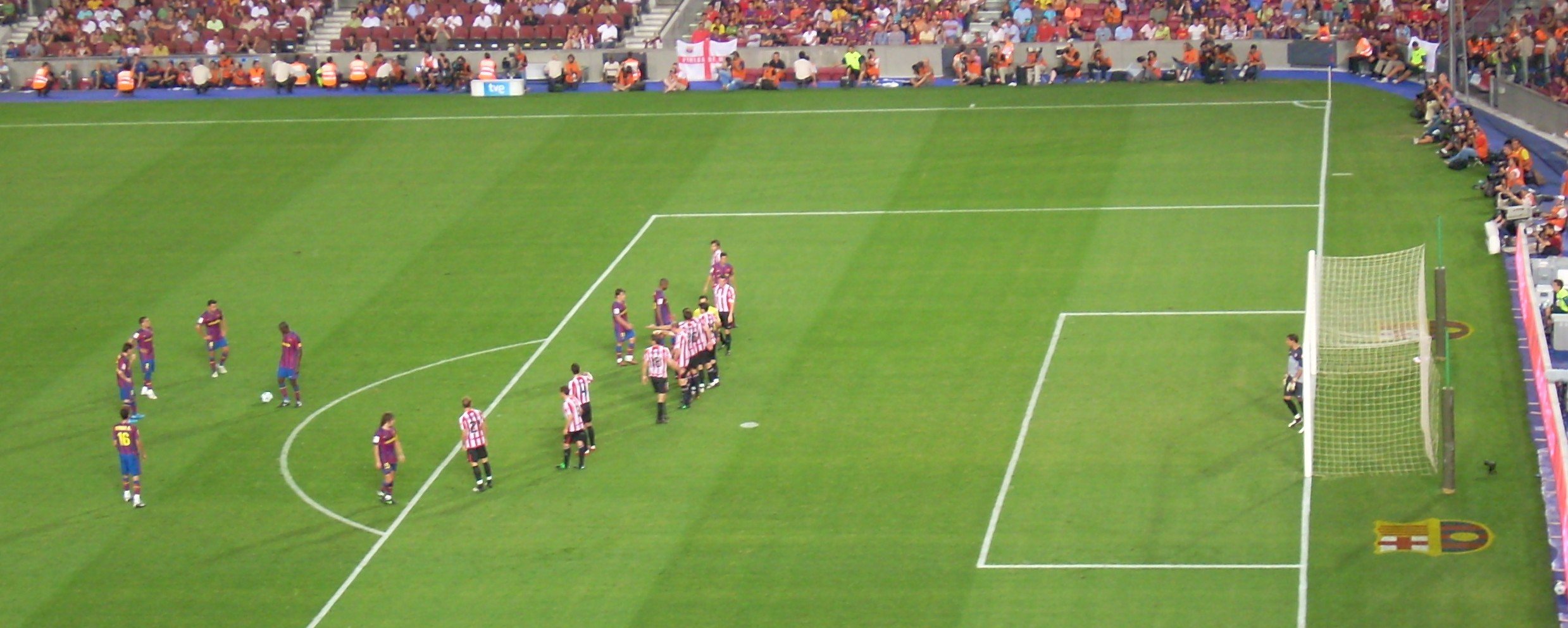
A scene from the 2009 Supercopa de España at Camp Nou

Among the many Blaugrana successes were three fairly comfortable Copa del Rey final wins over Athletic Bilbao: 2009 (4–1 in Valencia), 2012 (3–0 in Madrid), and 2015 (3–1 in Barcelona). All the finals included the pre-match Spanish national anthem being booed and whistled by both sets of supporters, which eventually drew fines for the clubs from the Spanish Sports Council in 2015. During the post-match celebrations in both 2009 and 2012, Barça captains Carles Puyol and Xavi endeared themselves to the Athletic fans by parading the Ikurriña (Basque flag) alongside their Catalan Senyera (in contrast to Andrés Iniesta who was unpopular due to accusations of exaggerating a foul leading to a red card in a league match), while another connection between the squads in 2012 was the admiration openly expressed by Barcelona coach Pep Guardiola for the tactical methods of Marcelo Bielsa, his counterpart at Athletic Bilbao. However, some of that goodwill was eroded in 2015 when Neymar indulged in 'showboating' in the closing stages of the match including flicking the ball over his opponent's head, which enraged the Athletic players as they considered it to be unsportsmanlike conduct.

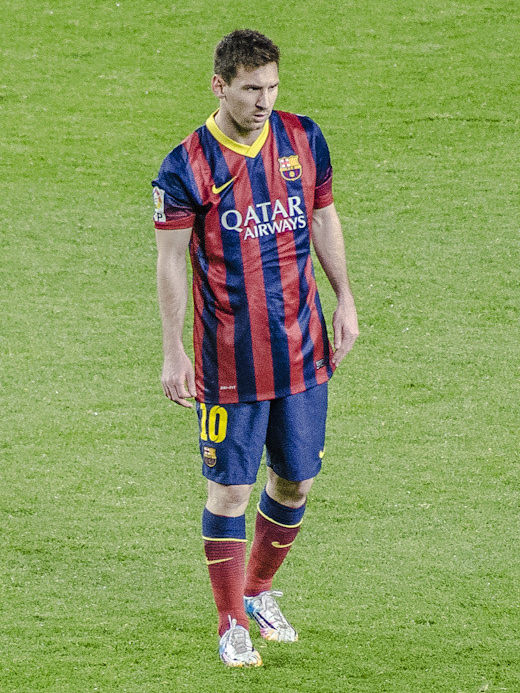
Lionel Messi is the fixture's all-time top goalscorer, among his many other records

Due to Barcelona also winning the league title in 2009 and 2015 (as well as the Champions League in both those years to achieve trebles), the subsequent Supercopa finals were also played between the sides; in the first, it was another straightforward win for the Blaugrana (5–1 on aggregate), but Athletic surprised many with a 4–0 home win in the first leg of the latter tie, eventually securing a 5–1 victory of their own. It was their first trophy of any kind since 1984, having endured a painful defeat to Atlético Madrid in the 2012 UEFA Europa League Final in addition to the losses to Barcelona, and so was celebrated with great enthusiasm by the supporters who crowded the streets of Bilbao city centre in their thousands for an open top bus parade normally reserved for much greater triumphs.

Messi was a scorer in each of those five finals, with his first in the 2015 Copa del Rey considered one of the best ever in the competition. Combined with another three two-legged cup ties – all won by Barcelona – it was one of Europe's most-played fixtures in the decade with 33 individual matches played between 2008–09 and 2017–18. They met in the cup once again in 2020, this time in a single match quarter-final in Bilbao after the Copa del Rey format was changed. The adjustment produced an atypical result as Athletic won 1–0, with Barcelona having no opportunity to overturn this deficit at home as in previous years.

The league results demonstrated a consistently wide gulf between the two clubs, with Athletic collecting no points at all from visits to the Camp Nou between 2004 and September 2018, when they finally secured a draw, and only winning twice at San Mamés in the same period. A 0–0 draw in February 2019 ended a sequence of 45 league matches since November 1996 with at least one goal being scored in the fixture.

In 2017, Barcelona chose to appoint Ernesto Valverde as manager after four years in charge of Athletic Bilbao, despite his inability to arrest the poor sequence against the Blaugrana; he was sacked in January 2020 due to a poor run of results, which included a 1–0 defeat in Bilbao on the opening day of the 2019–20 La Liga season. As mentioned above, Athletic also eliminated Barcelona from that season's Copa del Rey by the same scoreline, and the following year (by which time neither the winning coach in that tie Gaizka Garitano nor his defeated counterpart Quique Setién were in the dugout, replaced by Marcelino and Ronald Koeman respectively) they met in both the 2021 Supercopa de España Final, won by Athletic after extra time (at the end of which Messi was sent off for violent conduct for the first red card of his club career), and then in the 2021 Copa del Rey Final, won 4–0 by Barcelona in a dominant performance from the outset, Messi scoring twice. By the start of the 2021–22 season the Argentinian had left Barça amid a financial crisis and when the teams were drawn together in the Copa del Rey once again in January 2022, it was Athletic who eliminated the holders to progress. Another cup tie in 2024 produced the same outcome, with Athletic's three victories the only occasions that Barcelona had been eliminated prior to the semi-final stage of the competition since 2010.

=== Off-field events of 2017 ===
In October 2017, a referendum was held in Catalonia on the subject of the region becoming independent from Spain, which the organisers claimed had resulted in the majority voting for independence; the process was declared illegal by the Spanish state both before and after it was held, with widespread disorder on polling day including violence by security forces against civilians in the city of Barcelona; in the midst of this, FC Barcelona took the decision to close their stadium for a league fixture scheduled for the same day after a request to postpone it was rejected by the LFP – the match against Las Palmas was played behind closed doors.

Many of Barcelona's supporters within Catalonia, and several members of the club's hierarchy, are in favour of the region becoming independent from Spain, with banners and other slogans to this effect frequently seen at matches. Their visit to Bilbao at the end of that month was one of the few occasions when they were not met with open hostility from opposition fans for their perceived role as the club of the independence movement.

Were Catalonia to gain independence, the consequence for its clubs could be expulsion from the Spanish system, as stated on more than one occasion by the league's president Javier Tebas, potentially leading to Barcelona and Espanyol competing in a 'Catalan League' alongside very small clubs from the current third and fourth Spanish tiers. FIFA did not comment on the "potential future scenario". Similarly, Basque independence is an issue which continues to occupy the political scene in that region, with nationalist parties consistently receiving high percentages in elections. As with Barcelona, independence is a concept which is favoured by many of the Athletic Bilbao supporters in a wider context, but its implementation could result in their club being the largest in a hypothetical 'Basque League' with only a small number of professional teams, as well as bringing to an end their proud record of longevity competing in the Spanish league.

For Athletic, however, the more conventional danger of relegation (which has not concerned Barcelona for many years) could end that sequence sooner. The club's poor performance in the 2017–18 and 2018–19 seasons recalled more serious concerns over losing their league place a decade earlier. Due to so few eligible players being available under the limitations of their policy, they cannot simply buy their way out of trouble in a bad run of form. Previous surveys of supporters indicated the vast majority would rather see the team relegated than abandon their self-imposed restrictions on players.

== Head-to-head statistics ==
As of 7 March 2026

Competition	Pld	ATH	D	BAR	ATG	BAG
La Liga	190	60	32	98	260	362
Copa del Rey (Note: Does not include the 1902 Copa de la Coronación Final in which Athletic competed as part of Club Biscaya.)	45	15	6	24	59	77
Supercopa de España (Note: Does not include results in the unofficial 1941 FEF President's Cup or the 1945 Copa de Oro Argentina (see below).)	9	3	1	5	11	18
UEFA Cup	2	1	1	0	4	3
Total in official games (Note: The clubs never met in the defunct Copa Eva Duarte or Copa de la Liga.) (Note: The totals do not include two fixtures played in the Champions Tournament of 1927–28 (Barcelona 3–1 Athletic and Athletic Bilbao 0–1 Barcelona), part of the Liga Española de Football, a predecessor of the Spanish league which was never completed. Athletic Bilbao's archive refers to the matches in the competition as friendlies.)	246	79	40	127	334	460
1941–47 FEF President Cup	2	1	0	1	5	6
Copa de Oro Argentina	1	0	0	1	5	4
Friendly	53	23	7	23	126	110
Total	302	103	47	152	470	580

=== Head-to-head ranking in La Liga (1929–2025) ===
P.	29	30	31	32	33	34	35	36	40	41	42	43	44	45	46	47	48	49	50	51	52	53	54	55	56	57	58	59	60	61	62	63	64	65	66	67	68	69	70	71	72	73	74	75	76	77	78	79	80	81	82	83	84	85	86	87	88	89	90	91	92	93	94	95	96	97	98	99	00	01	02	03	04	05	06	07	08	09	10	11	12	13	14	15	16	17	18	19	20	21	22	23	24	25
1	1	1	1			1		1				1		1			1	1			1	1			1			1	1														1									1	1	1						1	1	1	1				1	1						1	1			1	1	1		1		1	1		1	1				1		1
2		2		2	2					2					2	2					2		2	2	2						2		2			2	2		2	2		2			2	2	2				2				2	2		2								2	2		2				2			2					2		2			2			2		2		2	
3	3			3					3			3			3									3		3	3	3	3						3			3			3			3		3	3						3	3	3				3						3												3													3				
4			4		4		4			4						4				4						4				4									4										4		4	4					4							4						4	4												4											4
5								5											5												5				5					5			5		5			5		5													5										5												5								5	
6							6						6	6			6	6	6			6	6				6					6		6																							6									6						6								6														
7											7									7										7				7		7	7												7									7														7												7		7								
8																																	8																													8		8				8											8									8			8	8		
9						9			9																																9	9						9		9																					9			9																				
10													10																			10												10																																					10									10				
11																																						11																															11								11												11					
12											12																																																12	12										12					12							12												
13																																																								13																						13																
14																																																													14																																	
15																																																																	15																													
16																																																																																							16							
17																																																																												17																		
18																																																																																														
19																																																																																														
20																																																																																														
21																																																																																														
22																																																																																														

• Total:Athletic Bilbao with 17 higher finishes, Barcelona with 77 higher finishes (as of the end of the 2024–25 season).

== Notable results ==
=== Highest scoring games ===
13 goals:

- Athletic Bilbao 12–1 Barcelona, February 1931, La Liga

12 goals:

- Athletic Bilbao 7–5 Barcelona, January 1940, La Liga

9 goals:

- Barcelona 6–3 Athletic Bilbao, December 1930, La Liga
- Athletic Bilbao 6–3 Barcelona, November 1941, La Liga

8 goals:

- Athletic Bilbao 3–5 Barcelona, March 1935, La Liga

=== Biggest wins ===
11 goal margin:

- Athletic Bilbao 12–1 Barcelona, February 1931, La Liga

7 goal margin:

- Barcelona 7–0 Athletic Bilbao, February 2001, La Liga

6 goal margin:

- Barcelona 0–6 Athletic Bilbao, October 1945, La Liga
- Athletic Bilbao 0–6 Barcelona, March 1991, La Liga
- Barcelona 6–0 Athletic Bilbao, January 2016, La Liga

5 goal margin:

- Athletic Bilbao 6–1 Barcelona, December 1933, La Liga
- Barcelona 5–0 Athletic Bilbao, December 1949, La Liga
- Barcelona 5–0 Athletic Bilbao, January 2026, Supercopa de España

== Personnel at both clubs ==
=== Players ===
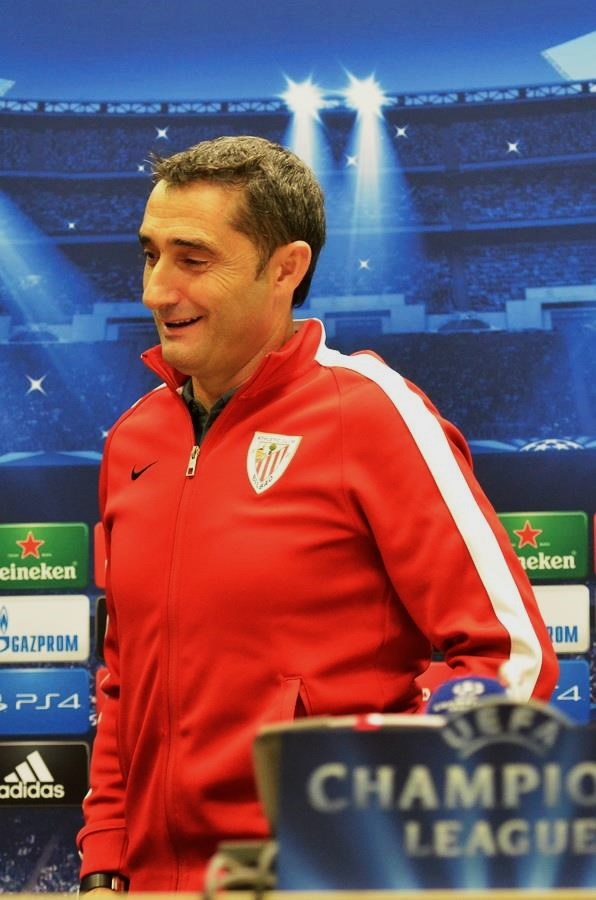
Ernesto Valverde has played for and coached both clubs.

Over their long histories, only sixteen players have played for both clubs in La Liga (others did so in the years prior to its introduction, including Félix Sesúmaga and Juan Irízar):

- Manuel Vidal Hermosa
- Luis Zabala
- Gonzalo Beitia
- Emilio Aldecoa
- Jaime Escudero
- Jesús Garay
- Pedro María Zabalza
- José Ramón Alexanko
- Andoni Zubizarreta
- Julio Salinas
- Ernesto Valverde
- Jon Andoni Goikoetxea
- Xabier Eskurza
- José Mari García
- Santi Ezquerro
- Inigo Martinez

=== Managers ===
Four coaches have been at the helm of both clubs:

- Conyers Kirby
- Ferdinand Daučík
- Salvador Artigas
- Ernesto Valverde

== Women's rivalry ==
Athletic Club Femenino and FC Barcelona Femení are two of the top teams in the Spanish women's league. Between 2009–10 and 2019–20, both always finished among the top five in the table with Athletic the team falling below those places in 2021, whereas in the same period Barcelona became established as one of the best teams in the world: they lost only two domestic league matches in four seasons, won two UEFA Women's Champions League titles and supplied eight members of the Spain squad which won the 2023 FIFA Women's World Cup (plus others who did not take part), with stars from across the world enhancing that group. In contrast, Athletic adhere to the club's Basque player policy and have experienced a similar decline in their stature to their male counterparts relative to the continued progression, professionalisation and globalisation of women's football, and the arrival of Real Madrid Femenino on the scene in 2020 ensured there would be another strong and well-financed opponent in contention for trophies (although not ready to challenge Barcelona's dominance).

One of the most important matches played between the clubs was played on 5 May 2013 at San Mamés: in a winner-takes-all game Athletic needed only one point to win their fifth title, but Barcelona beat the Basques 2–1 to ensure their own second championship. In 2016, it was Athletic who finished as champions, one point ahead of Barça. In the Copa de la Reina (won 9 times by Barcelona as of 2023, while Athletic have never done so), there has been one final played between the clubs, with the Catalans winning on penalties in 2014.

== See also ==
- Basque Country national football team
- Basque derby
- Catalonia national football team
- Derbi barceloní
- El Clásico
- Nationalism and sport
- National and regional identity in Spain
- El Viejo Clásico
