= 1942 Copa del Generalísimo final =

Copa del Generalísimo 1942 final
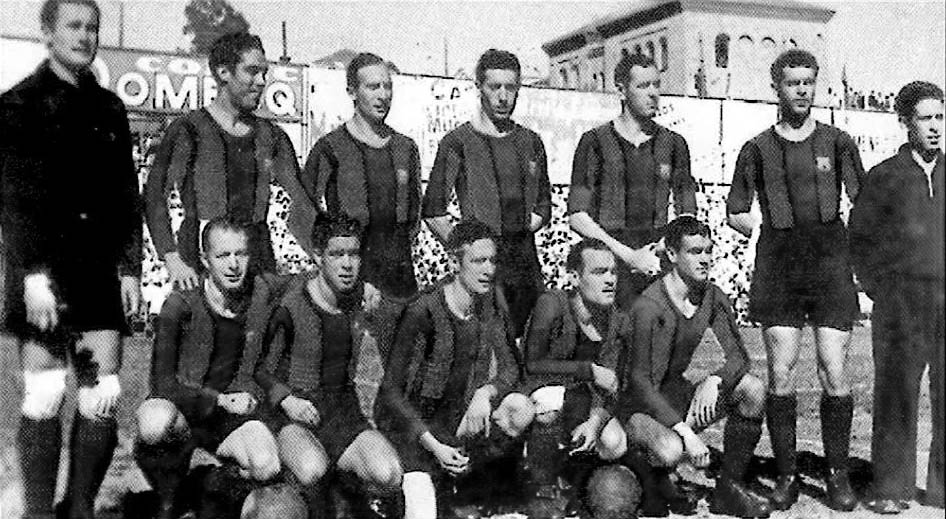
- A Barcelona team of 1942
- Event: 1942 Copa del Generalísimo
Barecelona	Athletic Bilbao
4	3
- (after extra time)
- Date: 21 June 1942
- Venue: Estadio Chamartín, Madrid
- Referee: Manuel Ocaña
- Attendance: 30,000

The Copa del Generalísimo 1942 final was the 40th final of the King's Cup. The final was played at Estadio Chamartín in madrid, on 21 June 1942, being won by Barcelona, who beat Athletic Bilbao 4–3 after extra time.

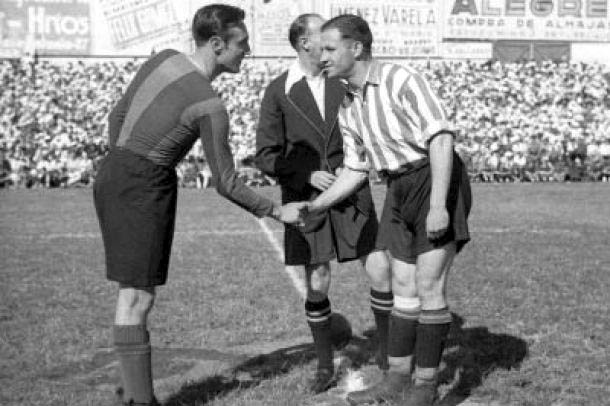
Captains of both teams greeting before the match

== Match details ==
21 June 1942
18:30 CET

Barcelona	4–3 (a.e.t.)	Athletic Bilbao
Escolà 20', 59'; Martín 51', 101'	Report	Iriondo 29'; Elices 79'; Zarra 81'

Estadio Chamartín, Madrid
Attendance: 30,000
Referee: Manuel Ocaña

Barcelona

Athletic Bilbao

GK	1	(Spain) Luis Miró
DF	2	(Spain) Luis Zabala
DF	3	(Spain) Benito García
MF	4	(Spain) Josep Raich (c)
MF	5	(Spain) Manuel Rosalench
MF	6	(Spain) Ignacio Llácer
FW	7	(Spain) Jaume Sospedra
FW	8	(Spain) Josep Escolà
FW	9	(Spain) Mariano Martín
FW	10	(Spain) Domènec Balmanya
FW	11	(Spain) José Bravo
Manager:
(Spain) Juan José Nogués

GK	1	(Spain) José María Echevarría
DF	2	(Spain) Juan José Mieza
DF	3	(Spain) Salvador Arqueta (c)
MF	4	(Spain) Roberto Bertol
MF	5	(Spain) Antonio Ortiz
MF	6	(Spain) Isidoro Urra
FW	7	(Spain) Rafael Iriondo
FW	8	(Spain) José Luis Panizo
FW	9	(Spain) Telmo Zarra
FW	10	(Spain) Francisco Gárate
FW	11	(Spain) Hermenegildo Elices
Manager:
(Spain) Juan Urquizu

== See also ==
- Athletic–Barcelona clásico
