= Leza, Spain =

Leza
- Municipality
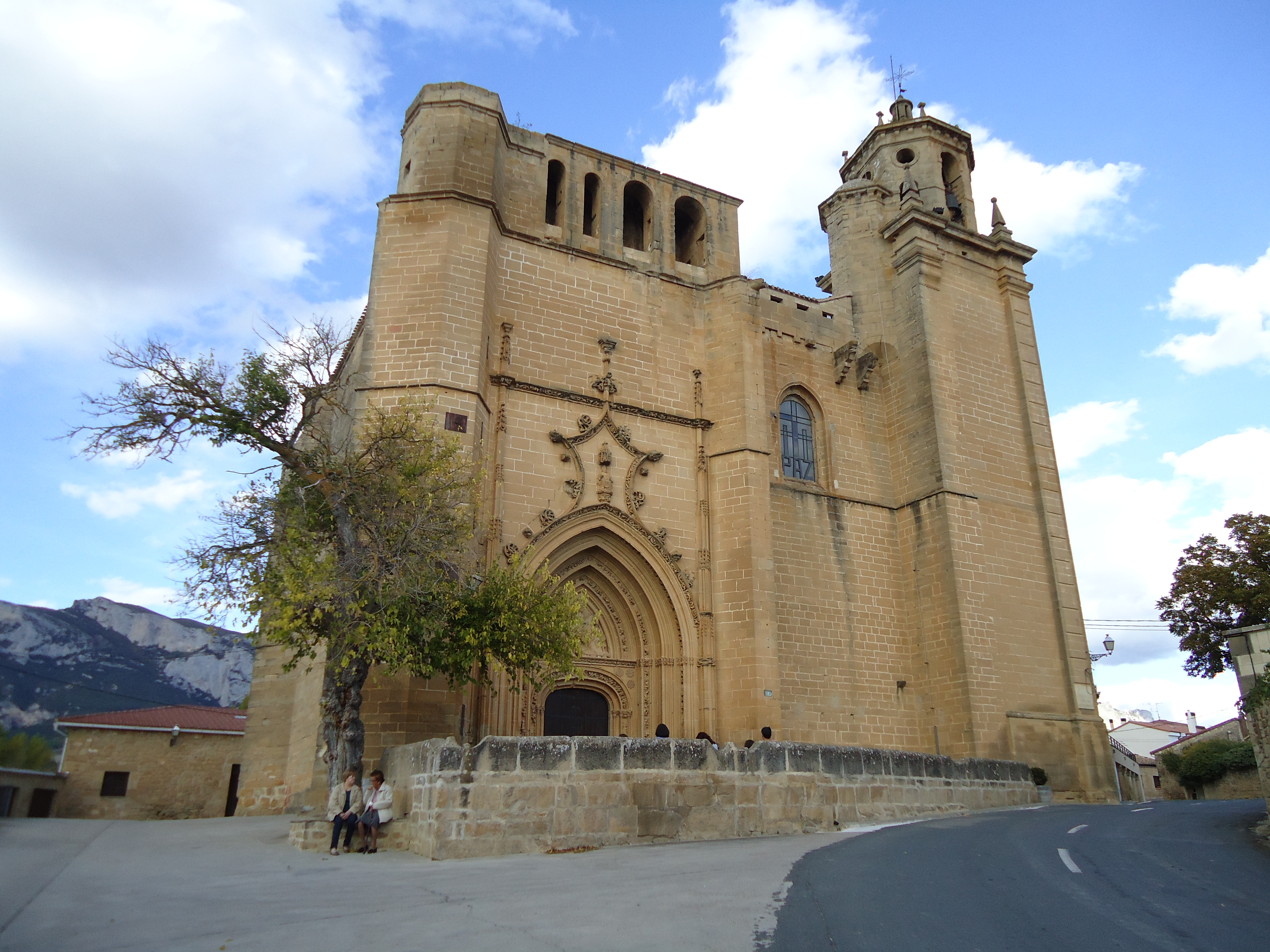
- Church of Leza

- Coat of arms

- Location of Leza within the Basque Country
- Coordinates: 42°34′N 2°38′W
- Country: Spain
- Autonomous Community: Basque Country
- Province: Álava
- Comarca: Arabako Errioxa / Rioja Alavesa

Government
  - Mayor: Inmaculada Laredo Fuertes

Area
  - Total: 10 km^{2} (3.9 sq mi)
- Elevation (AMSL): 572 m (1,877 ft)

Population (2025-01-01)
  - Total: 205
  - Density: 20/km^{2} (53/sq mi)
- Time zone: UTC+1 (CET)
  - Summer (DST): UTC+2 (CEST (GMT +2))
- Postal code: 01309

Leza is a town and municipality located in the province of Álava, in the Basque Country, northern Spain.
