= Javier Mandaluniz =

Spanish footballer (born 1987)

Personal information
- Full name: Javier Mandaluniz Renteria
- Date of birth: 15 January 1987 (age 39)
- Place of birth: Bilbao, Spain
- Height: 1.84 m (6 ft 0 in)
- Position: Goalkeeper

Youth career
- 1997–2005: Athletic Bilbao

Senior career*
Years	Team	Apps	(Gls)
2005–2008	Basconia	35	(0)
2006–2009	Bilbao Athletic	17	(0)
2007	→ Lleida (loan)	0	(0)
2009–2012	Real Sociedad B	33	(0)
2013–2014	Logroñés	41	(0)
2015	Gimnástica Torrelavega	0	(0)
2015–2017	Somozas	55	(0)
2017	Mérida	13	(0)
2017–2018	Jumilla	19	(0)
2018–2019	Ponferradina	17	(0)
2019–2020	Somorrostro	11	(0)
2020–2021	Urduliz	23	(0)
2021	Leioa	21	(0)
Total		285	(0)

International career
2003–2005	Spain U17	7	(0)
- * Club domestic league appearances and goals

Javier Mandaluniz Renteria (born 15 January 1987) is a Spanish former professional footballer who played as a goalkeeper.

== Club career ==
Mandaluniz joined Athletic Bilbao's youth system and was later promoted to the reserve team. In the 2007–08 season, he was loaned to Lleida. In the 2008–09 season he returned to Bilbao where he played eight matches for the B-side.

In June 2009, Mandaluniz was released by Athletic Bilbao. A month later, he signed for Real Sociedad B in the Tercera División, who were looking for a goalkeeper after the departure of Urtzi Iturrioz. In the 2009–10 season, he was called up to Real Sociedad first team several times after Asier Riesgo was injured, but he didn't play any matches.

In 2013, he joined SD Logroñés in the Segunda División B, after six months without a team. In the summer of 2015, after left Gimnástica de Torrelavega, he signed for Segunda División B club Somozas, where he played more than fifty games and conceded second-fewest goals in Group I of Segunda División B.

From 2017 to 2021, Mandaluniz played for several clubs in Tercera División before he announced his retirement. After his retirement, he worked as a goalkeeping coach for SD Eibar.

== International career ==
Mandaluniz was called up by coach Juan Santisteban to participate in the 2003 Under-17 World Cup and 2004 UEFA European Under-17.
