= André Didisheim =

Spanish footballer (1889–1975)

Personal information
- Full name: André Didisheim
- Date of birth: 23 August 1889
- Place of birth: Saint-Imier, Bern, Switzerland
- Date of death: 30 July 1975 (aged 85)
- Position: Forward

Senior career*
Years	Team	Apps	(Gls)
1908–1909	Madrid FC		
1909	Athletic Club		
- * Club domestic league appearances and goals

André Didisheim (23 August 1889 – 30 July 1975), sometimes wrongly referred to as Ditisheim or Didixein, was a Spanish footballer who played as a forward for Madrid FC and Athletic Bilbao. In October 2022, he became the last football player in the history of Real Madrid to be identified.

In addition to football, he also played tennis and Ski.

== Early life ==
André Didisheim was born in Saint-Imier, Switzerland, on 23 August 1889, into the Ditisheim family, a prominent dynasty of Swiss Jewish industrialists who were instrumental in the development of the Swiss watchmaking industry. As such, in 1907, the 18-year-old Didisheim went to Madrid to learn Spanish because at the time South America was one of the most important markets for Swiss watch manufacture, and therefore, speaking Spanish was highly important.

He was registered by his country in Madrid on 5 October 1908, as a single, office worker, who had arrived in Spain from Epiquerez, and who resided in Madrid together with his cousin Jean-Louis Didisheim, who was the soul of a powerful watch company called the Compagnie des Montres Marvin, SA, which invented a watch for left-handed people.

== Playing career ==
Ditisheim was an all-round athlete who could play tennis and ski, but above all was his talent in football, where he displayed his talent as an attacking midfielder and was signed by Madrid FC, making his debut in a friendly match played on the Avenida de la Plaza de Toros field against Sociedad Gimnástica on 29 November 1908. In total, he played eight matches for the club, including five competitive appearances in the 1909 Centro regional championship, two of those being tie-break matches against Sociedad Gimnástica and Atlético Madrid, where he scored the winner in both matches to seal two 2–1 victories.

Due to the absence of both Madrid and Atlético from the 1909 Copa del Rey, Athletic Bilbao sought out reinforcements from players based in the capital, mainly those from their subsidiary Atlético such as Antonio Vega de Seoane, but also three from Madrid FC – Julián Ruete, Luis Saura del Pan, and Didisheim – specifically for the 1909 cup, in which the Bilbao side was knocked out in the first round by Club Ciclista of San Sebastián.

== Later life ==
His cousin Jean-Louis died suddenly of sepsis, at the age of 53, after undergoing surgery on his leg due to an accident suffered while practicing skiing. The two were vital in the family watch business, which André continued after the death of his relative through the company Vulcain et Studio, SA.

In 1924, Didisheim founded a new watch brand for the Vulcain company, and ten years later, in 1934, Vulcain became the chronograph of Real Madrid who, in that same year, became champion of the Copa del Rey against Valencia CF. During that season, Madrid's coach Paco Bru used his Vulcain to calculate the times in the training sessions. Ditisheim died on 30 July 1975, at the age of 85.

== Discovering his identity ==
In his brief time at Madrid, Didisheim's surname was written in all the chronicles of the time as "Didixein", resulting in him being the last footballer in the history of Real Madrid to be identified; this was achieved in October 2022 thanks to the research work of the journalist Lartaun de Azumendi, member of CIHEFE. According to Azumendi, he had first read the reference to "Didixein" when he was a child and "it had not stopped attracting my attention". He did most of his research work during the COVID-19 pandemic since the confinement allowed him to dedicate more free time to the task, which started with an extensive investigation of the Spanish sports press from the time in search of every time the name appeared, and although he eventually managed to identify his face in a Real Madrid photograph published on 1 February 1909 in the Madrid newspaper Gran Vida, Azumendi reached a dead end beyond the records found.

The possibility occurred to Azumendi that the name of the player was spelled incorrectly, and he converted the "x" into "sh" (Didixein into Didishein), a surname with clear Hebrew roots, especially if the final letter was changed to "m". After a promising lead for a J. Didisheim was ruled out due to photographs (Note: Azumendi found an advertisement in El Imparcial of Madrid on 17 November 1907, stating "Young Swiss man, wishing to learn Spanish, already knowing French and German. J. Didisheim". This led him to Jean Didisheim, born in Bern in 1891 into a family of watchmakers who moved to Neuchâtel, but the progress was halted when they found a photograph of the young Jean, which did not fit with the ones he had of the Madrid player.) Azumendi kept looking and found out that between 1907 and 1909 two Didisheims were residing in Madrid, Jean-Louis and André, but football did not appear as an important element in either biography and despite trying to contact heirs, that path did not advance. It was only a photograph of André as a young man that clarified he was the same person in the old images of Madrid; furthermore, in his obituary in L'Impartial on 31 July 1975, the deceased was remembered as a great athlete who at the beginning of the century was in Spain and played for a Spanish team.

== Legacy ==
In spring 2023, Vulcain, in collaboration with CronotempVs Collectors, launched a limited edition Cricket watch called "André Didixein", which was created as a tribute to André Didisheim, the grandson of the brand's founder, who was a director of the company for 50 years.
