= José Mandaluniz =

Spanish footballer and manager (1910–1973)

Personal information
- Full name: José Mandaluniz Ealo
- Date of birth: 19 March 1910
- Place of birth: Galdakao, Biscay, Spain
- Date of death: 15 May 1973 (aged 63)
- Place of death: Maracaibo, Venezuela
- Position: Forward

Senior career*
Years	Team	Apps	(Gls)
1928–1930	Athletic Bilbao	9	(3)
1930–1931	Arenas de Getxo	10	(4)
1931–1932	Real Madrid	0	(0)
1933–1935	Athletic Bilbao	12	(3)
1935–1936	Espanyol	10	(4)
1937	Stade Français		
1939–1945	Rouen		
1945–1947	Stade Français		
1950–1951	Rouen		
Total		41	(14)

Managerial career
- 1947–1949: Lorient
- 1949–1950: Barakaldo
- 1950–1952: Rouen
- * Club domestic league appearances and goals

José Mandaluniz Ealo (19 March 1910 – 15 May 1973) was a Spanish footballer who played as a forward for Spanish clubs Athletic Bilbao and Espanyol in the 1930s, and later for French clubs Stade Français and Rouen in the 1940s.

After retiring, he worked as a manager in the 1940s.

== Playing career ==
=== Spain ===
Born on 19 March 1910 in Galdakao, Biscay, on 19 March 1910, Mandalúniz began his football career at his hometown club Athletic Bilbao in 1928, aged 18, making his debut for the first team in a Biscay Championship match against Barakaldo on 30 September, helping his side to a 4–0 win. In his second season there, he did not play a single official match for the club, so in 1930, he signed for fellow Biscay team Arenas de Getxo, where he scored 4 goals in La Liga matches, which earned him a move to Real Madrid, where he also failed to play a single official game for the club, remaining an unused substitute as the Merengue club won the 1931–32 La Liga, so he then returned to Athletic in 1933, where he once again remaining an unused substitute as the Basque club won the 1933–34 La Liga. In the following season, however, he scored 3 goals in 12 La Liga matches, but this time Bilbao finished fourth. In total, he played 23 official matches for Bilbao.

Mandalúniz then joined Espanyol, with whom he scored 5 goals in 14 official matches, but his career there was then interrupted by the outbreak of the Spanish Civil War. In total, his La Liga tally with Athletic, Arenas, and Espanyol stands at 14 goals in 41 matches.

In 1937, Mandaluniz was the captain of the football team of the Euzko Gudarostea, the name of the army commanded by the Basque Government during the Civil War. In February of that year, he was part of the Biscayan national team in the Pro Avión Euzkadi and Pro Konsomol matches.

=== France ===
In mid-1937, Mandaluniz and his wife Polixene Trabudua fled Spain on a freighter for exile with three young children. After briefly playing for Stade Français in 1937, they went to Bordeaux, where his wife organized colonies for child refugees from the Civil War. In 1939, he signed for FC Rouen, with whom he played for six years, until 1945. While there, he stood out for his goalscoring ability, being crowned the league's top scorer in 1942, with 17 goals. He then returned to Stade Français for two more seasons between 1945 and 1947, where he coincided with Marcel Domingo and Larbi Benbarek.

== Managerial career ==
After retiring, Mandaluniz coached Lorient (1947–49) and Barakaldo (1949–50). In 1950, Athletic offered him a coaching contract, so he asked his wife, still living in Lorient, to return to the Basque Country, which she did with some apprehension because she distrusted the Franco regime, and she was quickly proven right as the couple was considered enemies of the homeland, and Athletic was forced to dismiss Mandalúniz, while she, albeit briefly, was arrested and imprisoned. He then returned to France, where he oversaw Rouen for two years, from late 1950 until 1952. In his first season as coach of Rouen, he had to step onto the field occasionally, playing a total of two matches during the 1950–51 season.

== Death ==
Mandaluniz and his family later emigrated to Venezuela, where he led the Vasco de Caracas. He died in Maracaibo on 15 May 1973, at the age of 63.
