= Luis Bergareche =

Spanish businessman and footballer

Personal information
- Full name: Luis Bergareche Maruri
- Date of birth: 16 May 1910
- Place of birth: Balmaseda, Biscay, Spain
- Date of death: 9 September 1994 (aged 84)
- Place of death: Bilbao, Biscay, Spain
- Position: Midfielder

Senior career*
Years	Team	Apps	(Gls)
1924–1925	Deusto		
1925–1926	Athletic Bilbao	1	(0)
1926–1927	Sociedad Gimnástica		
1928–1929	Athletic Bilbao	5	(2)
1929–1930	Real Madrid		
1930–1931	Racing de Madrid		
1934–1936	Getxo		
1940–1941	Indautxu		
1943–1944	Arenas de Getxo		
- * Club domestic league appearances and goals

Luis Bergareche Maruri (16 May 1910 – 9 September 1994) was a Spanish businessman and footballer who played as a midfielder for Athletic Bilbao and Real Madrid in the 1920s. He is best known for scoring Athletic's first-ever goal in La Liga in 1929.

== Early life ==
Luis Bergareche was born on 16 May 1910 in Balmaseda, Biscay, as the son of Santiago Bergareche, the director of a beret factory, and Adelaida Maruri, who moved to Deusto when he was a child.

During his youth, Bergareche developed a deep passion not only for football, going as far as to lie about his age to participate in a youth championship in 1922, aged 12, but also for cycling, going as far as to have a fall that left him in a coma for three days in 1927, aged 17.

== Playing career ==
=== Athletic Bilbao ===
In 1924, the 14-year-old Bergareche joined the ranks of his hometown club Deusto, becoming the youngest player in Spain to debut in a Serie A regional championship match, ahead of the likes of Josep Samitier and Ricardo Zamora, who did so at 15. His career, however, did not look promising, as Deusto was a modest club, so the duty of caring for eleven siblings forced him to leave for the United States, specifically to Akron, Ohio, where he put his studies in mercantile professorship and business teaching to good use, training in the management of large companies, and working at Firestone. Bergareche went on to become an Athletic Bilbao player in the 1925–26 season, but due to his tender age of 15, he was unable to make a single official appearance for the club's first team. In 1926, he joined Sociedad Gimnástica, with whom he played in the 1926–27 Centro Regional Championship, starting as a defender on the first matchday, which ended in a 6–0 loss to his future club Real Madrid.

In 1928, Bergareche returned to Athletic, for whom he only played five official matches, all of whom within a period of just two months, in January and February 1929, starting in the two legs of both the quarterfinals and the semifinals of the 1928–29 Copa del Rey, and then playing the opening match of the inaugural edition of La Liga on 10 February, in which he scored a first-half equaliser to help his side to a 1–1 draw with Real Sociedad at the Atotxa Stadium, thus going down in history as the author of the first-ever La Liga goal in the club's history. However, contemporary accounts disagreed on who scored the goal, with Mundo Deportivo stating that it was Victorio Unamuno, while La Vanguardia attribute it to Bergareche, and the ABC did not even name the goalscorer, describing it as "a cross from Lafuente give rise to a small melee, with the goalkeeper coming out and thus leaving the goal empty. Several players come to the shot, and finally, we see a header that sends the ball into the goal, achieving the tie, despite the clear offside that the referee doesn't want to see".

=== Real Madrid ===
Bergareche never again played for Bilbao as he was then forced to move to Madrid to help his father with a newly opened business, and as soon as he arrived in the capital, he was sought after by both Atlético Madrid and Real Madrid, but he ended up joining the latter because his friend Ochandiano was already there. He made his debut for the club in a friendly match against Atlético on 15 September 1929, scoring a brace to help his side salvage a 4–4 draw. In his first (and only) season at the club, he played a total of four official matches, one in the regional championship, one in the Copa del Rey, and two in the league. In total, he scored 1 goal in three La Liga matches for Bilbao and Madrid.

=== Later career ===
Bergareche was failing to balance training with work obligations, so even though he had signed a professional contract with Madrid worth 500 pesetas per month, his father ordered him to hang his boots. In partnership with his brother Ignacio, he worked at Bergareche y Compañía SA. Returning to his home region in 1934, he played some more football for Getxo (1934–36) and Indautxu (1940–41), having founded the latter with Jaime Olaso.

== Other sports ==
In 1940, Bergareche was a boxing promoter, and in 1944, he was a state runner-up in Pala corta, a form of Basque pelota. He also presided over the Fishing Club of Lekeitio, which hosted the Spanish tuna fishing championship.

Bergareche also served as the treasurer of the International Association of Cyclist Course Organizers, or in other words, the general director of the Vuelta a España, a position that he held for over two decades. Thus, in the 25th anniversary of this race in 1970, he was awarded the gold medal for cycling. He was also a member of the board of directors of the Spanish Cycling Federation.

== Personal life ==
In 1942, Bergareche married Josefa Busquet, with whom he had at least one son, who married the daughter of Ramón Mendoza, president of Real Madrid from 1985 to 1995, and the couple had at least one son, Jacobo, a screenwriter and entrepreneur.

== Journalist career and death ==
In 1945, Bergareche entered the world of journalism when he joined the company Bilbao Editorial SA, a supporter of El Noticiero Bilbaino linked to Bergareche, and a few weeks later, he was appointed advisor to El Correo Español. Three years later, in 1948, he became a councilor of Vascongada de Publications as well as an editor of El Diario Vasco from San Sebastián, becoming president of the latter in 1970.

In 1968, Bergareche was a founding president of Servicios Auxiliares de Prensa Independiente, and in 1977, he replaced the murdered Javier Ybarra as the new editor of El Diario Vasco, the largest news agency in Vasconia. In that same year, he was also named president of the Bilbao Editorial SA, a position that he held for 12 years, from 1977 until June 1989, when he was replaced by Santiago de Ybarra, being later named as its honorary president, a position that he held until he died on 9 September 1994, at the age of 84.

== Honours ==
Real Madrid

- Centro Championship:
  - Champions (1): 1929–30
