= 1945–46 Copa Federación de España =

Tournament details
- Country: Spain

Final positions
- Champions: Alavés
- Runner-up: Sueca

Tournament statistics
- Matches played: 440
- Goals scored: 1,849 (4.2 per match)

The 1945–46 Copa Federación de España was the second staging (old competition) of the Copa Federación de España, a knockout competition for Spanish football clubs.

The competition began on 10 February 1946 and ended with the final on 20 June 1946, where Alavés became champion after defeating Sueca.

== Competition ==
=== First round ===
==== Group 1 ====
===== Group 1-A =====
Team	Pld	W	D	L	GF	GA	GD	Pts
Lucense	6	4	1	1	17	6	+11	9
Juvenil	6	4	1	1	13	10	+3	9
Betanzos	6	2	0	4	8	11	−3	4
Galicia	6	1	0	5	5	16	−11	2

===== Group 1-B =====
Team	Pld	W	D	L	GF	GA	GD	Pts
Berbés	6	4	1	1	16	6	+10	9
Santiago	5	3	1	1	11	7	+4	7
Lemos	5	1	2	2	6	10	−4	4
Turista	6	1	0	5	5	15	−10	2

==== Group 2 ====
Team	Pld	W	D	L	GF	GA	GD	Pts
Avilés	10	8	1	1	45	11	+34	17
Gijonés	10	6	3	1	30	12	+18	15
Caudal	10	5	3	2	28	15	+13	13
Juvencia	10	2	2	6	20	27	−7	6
Arnao	10	3	0	7	16	38	−22	6
Langreano	10	1	1	8	14	50	−36	3

==== Group 3 ====
Team	Pld	W	D	L	GF	GA	GD	Pts
Alavés	10	8	1	1	30	17	+13	17
Durango	10	6	1	3	29	20	+9	13
Mirandés	10	5	0	5	23	23	0	10
Burgos	10	3	2	5	25	21	+4	8
Santoña	10	3	1	6	15	27	−12	7
Rayo Cantabria	10	1	3	6	15	29	−14	5

==== Group 4 ====
Team	Pld	W	D	L	GF	GA	GD	Pts
Osasuna	10	7	1	2	38	10	+28	15
Baztán	10	4	3	3	16	12	+4	11
Real Unión	10	5	1	4	18	20	−2	11
Tolosa	10	3	3	4	33	25	+8	9
Villafranca	10	4	0	6	14	44	−30	8
Izarra	10	3	0	7	19	27	−8	6

==== Group 5 ====
Team	Pld	W	D	L	GF	GA	GD	Pts
Atlético Zaragoza	10	6	1	3	26	14	+12	13
Tudelano	10	6	1	3	32	22	+10	13
Escoriaza	10	6	0	4	22	20	+2	12
Belchite	10	4	2	4	16	19	−3	10
Teruel	10	2	3	5	12	26	−14	7
Numancia	10	2	1	7	14	22	−8	5

==== Group 6 ====
Team	Pld	W	D	L	GF	GA	GD	Pts
Olot	10	6	1	3	21	16	+5	13
Granollers	9	6	1	2	18	13	+5	13
Igualada	9	4	3	2	18	13	+5	11
San Martín	10	4	1	5	18	19	−1	9
Gerona	9	2	1	6	5	10	−5	5
Manacor	9	2	1	6	5	14	−9	5

==== Group 7 ====
Team	Pld	W	D	L	GF	GA	GD	Pts
Sans	10	6	2	2	26	12	+14	14
Lérida	10	7	0	3	20	12	+8	14
Valls	10	5	1	4	13	20	−7	11
Tarrasa	10	4	2	4	20	15	+5	10
Tortosa	10	4	1	5	19	17	+2	9
Huesca	10	0	2	8	4	26	−22	2

==== Group 8 ====
Team	Pld	W	D	L	GF	GA	GD	Pts
Sueca	10	6	2	2	23	13	+10	14
Carcagente	10	6	1	3	33	16	+17	13
Saguntino	10	4	2	4	17	21	−4	10
Játiva	10	4	1	5	23	16	+7	9
Acero	10	4	0	6	18	26	−8	8
Malvarrosa	10	3	0	7	12	34	−22	6

==== Group 9 ====
Team	Pld	W	D	L	GF	GA	GD	Pts
Imperial	8	6	0	2	22	11	+11	12
Cartagena	8	6	0	2	24	14	+10	12
Yeclano	8	5	1	2	19	12	+7	11
Cieza	8	2	0	6	18	24	−6	4
Gimnástica Abad	8	0	1	7	4	26	−22	1

==== Group 10 ====
Team	Pld	W	D	L	GF	GA	GD	Pts
Almoradí	8	5	2	1	31	12	+19	12
Eldense	7	2	4	1	19	15	+4	8
Orihuela	7	3	1	3	19	21	−2	7
Crevillente	8	2	2	4	11	24	−13	6
Alicante	8	2	1	5	13	21	−8	5

==== Group 11 ====
Team	Pld	W	D	L	GF	GA	GD	Pts
Segoviana	10	5	2	3	23	17	+6	12
Atlético Zamora	10	5	1	4	18	19	−1	11
Ávila	10	4	2	4	27	25	+2	10
Béjar	10	4	2	4	19	24	−5	10
Alas	9	2	4	3	21	23	−2	8
Palencia	9	3	1	5	22	22	0	7

==== Group 12 ====
Team	Pld	W	D	L	GF	GA	GD	Pts
Ferroviaria	10	7	0	3	24	17	+7	14
Talavera	10	6	1	3	26	13	+13	13
Tomelloso	10	5	3	2	20	9	+11	13
Manchego	10	3	2	5	23	26	−3	8
Plasencia	10	3	2	5	22	32	−10	8
Emeritense	10	2	0	8	11	29	−18	4

==== Group 13 ====
Team	Pld	W	D	L	GF	GA	GD	Pts
Antequerano	10	7	1	2	19	16	+3	15
Huelva	10	6	1	3	41	17	+24	13
Coria	10	5	0	5	25	18	+7	10
Egrabense	10	4	1	5	19	25	−6	9
Electromecánica	10	3	1	6	17	27	−10	7
Calavera	10	3	0	7	15	33	−18	6

==== Group 14 ====
Team	Pld	W	D	L	GF	GA	GD	Pts
Algeciras	10	6	3	1	35	12	+23	15
Linense	10	6	0	4	22	24	−2	12
San Fernando	10	5	1	4	25	27	−2	11
Cádiz	10	3	3	4	17	17	0	9
Tetuán	10	3	2	5	22	29	−7	8
Larache	10	2	1	7	12	24	−12	5

=== Second round ===
Team 1	Agg.	Team 2	1st leg	2nd leg
Lucense	7–3	Berbés	6–0	1–3
Avilés	2–4	Gijonés	2–1	0–3
Osasuna	4–7	Durango	2–5	2–2
Baztán	2–8	Alavés	0–4	2–4
Lérida	4–6	Granollers	1–2	3–4
Sans	12–3	Olot	9–0	3–3
Almoradí	–	Imperial	–	2–0
Cartagena	–	Orihuela	–	–
Atlético Zamora	3–6	Segoviana	3–2	0–4
Tomelloso	–	Talavera	5–1	–
Antequerano	1–6	Huelva	1–1	0–5
Algeciras	5–1	Linense	1–1	4–0

=== Third round ===
Team 1	Agg.	Team 2	1st leg	2nd leg
Imperial	9–2	Cartagena	6–1	3–1
Lucense	5–4	Gijonés	4–0	1–4
Algeciras	5–6	Huelva	3–0	2–6
Granollers	5–3	Sans	0–1	5–2
Sueca	5–1	Carcagente	4–1	1–0
Tomelloso	1–3	Segoviana	1–0	0–3
Durango	1–3	Alavés	0–2	1–1
Tudelano	4–5	Atlético Zaragoza	3–3	1–2

=== Fourth round ===
Team 1	Agg.	Team 2	1st leg	2nd leg
Lucense	6–4	Segoviana	3–0	3–4
Atlético Zaragoza	2–6	Alavés	2–1	0–5
Granollers	2–5	Sueca	1–2	1–3
Huelva	1–5	Imperial	1–2	0–3

=== Semi-finals ===
Team 1	Agg.	Team 2	1st leg	2nd leg
Lucense	3–6	Alavés	3–3	0–3
Imperial	5–6	Sueca	5–2	0–4

=== Final ===
20 June 1946

Alavés	3 – 2	Sueca

Estadio Metropolitano de Madrid, Madrid
