= Real Juvencia =

Spanish football club

- Full name: Real Juvencia
- Founded: 1923
- Ground: Quintana, Trubia, Oviedo, Asturias, Spain
- Capacity: 1,000
- President: José Antonio Balán
- Manager: Adrián Palacio
- League: Segunda Asturfútbol – Group 2
- 2024–25: Segunda Asturfútbol – Group 2, 5th of 18
Home colours	Away colours

Real Juvencia (sometimes known as Real Juvencia de Trubia) is a Spanish football club based in Trubia (municipality of Oviedo), in the autonomous community of Asturias. Founded in 1923 after the disappearance of Racing de Trubia, they play in Segunda Asturfútbol – Group 2, holding home matches at the Campo de Fútbol de Quintana.

== Season to season ==
Season	Level	Division	Place	Copa del Rey
1929–1940	—	Regional	—	
1940–41	3	3ª	4th	
1941–42	3	1ª Reg.	4th	
1942–43	3	1ª Reg.	5th	
1943–44	3	3ª	6th	Second round
1944–45	3	3ª	3rd	
1945–46	3	3ª	10th	
1946–47	3	3ª	4th	
1947–48	3	3ª	11th	First round
1948–49	3	3ª	6th	First round
1949–50	3	3ª	3rd	
1950–51	3	3ª	3rd	
1951–52	3	3ª	13th	
1952–53	4	1ª Reg.	4th	
1953–54	4	1ª Reg.	1st	
1954–55	3	3ª	10th	
1955–56	3	3ª	10th	
1956–57	3	3ª	5th	
1957–58	3	3ª	4th	
1958–1962	DNP			

Season	Level	Division	Place	Copa del Rey
1962–63	5	2ª Reg.	10th	
1963–64	5	2ª Reg.	3rd	
1964–65	4	1ª Reg.	5th	
1965–66	4	1ª Reg.	7th	
1966–67	4	1ª Reg.	4th	
1967–68	4	1ª Reg.	2nd	
1968–69	4	1ª Reg.	9th	
1969–70	4	1ª Reg.	6th	
1970–71	4	1ª Reg.	12th	
1971–72	4	1ª Reg.	13th	
1972–73	4	1ª Reg.	18th	
1973–74	4	Reg. Pref.	15th	
1974–75	4	Reg. Pref.	17th	
1975–76	5	2ª Reg. P.	14th	
1976–77	5	2ª Reg. P.	16th	
1977–78	6	2ª Reg. P.	11th	
1978–79	6	1ª Reg.	14th	
1979–80	6	1ª Reg.	15th	
1980–81	6	1ª Reg.	15th	
1981–82	6	1ª Reg.	13th	

Season	Level	Division	Place	Copa del Rey
1982–83	6	1ª Reg.	8th	
1983–84	6	1ª Reg.	4th	
1984–85	5	Reg. Pref.	14th	
1985–86	5	Reg. Pref.	17th	
1986–87	5	Reg. Pref.	16th	
1987–88	5	Reg. Pref.	20th	
1988–89	6	1ª Reg.	14th	
1989–90	6	1ª Reg.	3rd	
1990–91	5	Reg. Pref.	17th	
1991–92	5	Reg. Pref.	10th	
1992–93	5	Reg. Pref.	13th	
1993–94	5	Reg. Pref.	10th	
1994–95	5	Reg. Pref.	13th	
1995–96	5	Reg. Pref.	10th	
1996–97	5	Reg. Pref.	18th	
1997–98	6	1ª Reg.	3rd	
1998–99	5	Reg. Pref.	20th	
1999–2000	6	1ª Reg.	10th	
2000–01	6	1ª Reg.	10th	
2001–02	6	1ª Reg.	8th	

Season	Level	Division	Place	Copa del Rey
2002–03	6	1ª Reg.	13th	
2003–04	6	1ª Reg.	19th	
2004–05	7	2ª Reg.	9th	
2005–06	7	2ª Reg.	5th	
2006–07	7	2ª Reg.	8th	
2007–08	7	2ª Reg.	10th	
2008–09	7	2ª Reg.	6th	
2009–10	7	2ª Reg.	2nd	
2010–11	7	2ª Reg.	3rd	
2011–12	7	2ª Reg.	6th	
2012–13	7	2ª Reg.	4th	
2013–14	7	2ª Reg.	1st	
2014–15	6	1ª Reg.	5th	
2015–16	6	1ª Reg.	6th	
2016–17	6	1ª Reg.	11th	
2017–18	6	1ª Reg.	4th	
2018–19	6	1ª Reg.	13th	
2019–20	6	1ª Reg.	12th	
2020–21	6	1ª Reg.	1st	
2021–22	7	1ª Reg.	2nd	

Season	Level	Division	Place	Copa del Rey
2022–23	7	2ª RFFPA	8th	
2023–24	7	2ª Astur.	7th	
2024–25	7	2ª Astur.	5th	

- 16 seasons in Tercera División
