= 1942 Copa del Generalísimo =

40th Copa del Rey

Tournament details
- Country: Spain
- Teams: 32

Final positions
- Champions: CF Barcelona (9th title)
- Runners-up: Club Atlético Bilbao

Tournament statistics
- Matches played: 68

The 1942 Copa del Generalísimo was the 40th staging of the Copa del Rey, the Spanish football cup competition.

The competition began on 26 April 1942 and ended on 21 June 1942 with the final, where CF Barcelona won their ninth title.

== First round ==
Team 1	Agg.	Team 2	1st leg	2nd leg
Real Valladolid Deportivo	4–3	RC Celta de Vigo	4–0	0–3
Real Gijón	4–4	Real Oviedo CF	3–1	1–3
Cultural y Deportiva Leonesa	0–1	RC Deportivo de La Coruña	0–1	0–0
Arenas Club de Guecho	2–2	Real Sociedad de Fútbol	2–1	0–1
CD Logroñés	2–8	Club Atlético de Bilbao	1–0	1–8
CA Osasuna	1–1	Real Zaragoza CD	1–1	0–0
Terrassa CF	2–5	CF Barcelona	2–1	0–4
RCD Español	5–3	CD Sabadell CF	3–1	2–2
UD Levante Gimnástico	2–6	CD Castellón	2–1	0–5
Elche CF	2–6	Valencia CF	1–4	1–2
Real Murcia CF	3–2	Alicante CF	1–1	2–1
AD Ferroviaria	2–7	Real Madrid CF	1–3	1–4
UD Salamanca	2–6	Club Atlético de Aviación	1–0	1–6
Real Betis Balompié	3–5	Jerez CF	2–2	1–3
CD Málaga	3–6	Granada CF	2–4	1–2
SD Ceuta	4–6	Sevilla CF	3–2	1–4

Source: RSSSF

- Tiebreaker

Team 1	Score	Team 2
Real Gijón	1-2	Real Oviedo CF
Arenas Club de Guecho	1–1	Real Sociedad de Fútbol
Arenas Club de Guecho	1–7	Real Sociedad de Fútbol
CA Osasuna	2–4	Real Zaragoza CD

== Round of 16 ==
Team 1	Agg.	Team 2	1st leg	2nd leg
Club Atlético de Aviación	2–0	RC Deportivo de La Coruña	2–0	0–0
CD Castellón	2–2	Real Madrid CF	1–0	1–2
RCD Español	4–3	Real Zaragoza CD	2–0	2–3
Valencia CF	11–3	Real Sociedad de Fútbol	6–1	5–2
Sevilla CF	1–5	CF Barcelona	1–2	0–3
Club Atlético de Bilbao	8–2	Jerez CF	6–0	2–2
Real Oviedo CF	1–5	Granada CF	1–1	0–4
Real Murcia CF	4–4	Real Valladolid Deportivo	3–0	1–4

Source: RSSSF

- Tiebreaker

Team 1	Score	Team 2
CD Castellón	0–1	Real Madrid CF
Real Murcia CF	1–3	Real Valladolid Deportivo

== Quarter-finals ==
Team 1	Agg.	Team 2	1st leg	2nd leg
Real Madrid C.F.	3–3	Club Atlético de Bilbao	2–1	1–2
Real Valladolid Deportivo	6–5	Club Atlético de Aviación	3–3	3–2
RCD Español	4–6	CF Barcelona	2–3	2–3
Granada CF	3–6	Valencia CF	3–1	0–5

Source: RSSSF

- Tiebreaker

Team 1	Score	Team 2
Real Madrid C.F.	1– 2	Club Atlético de Bilbao

== Semi-finals ==
Team 1	Agg.	Team 2	1st leg	2nd leg
Valencia CF	3–5	CF Barcelona	1–2	2–3
Club Atlético de Bilbao	6–4	Real Valladolid Deportivo	6–1	0–3

Source: RSSSF

== Final ==
Team 1	Score	Team 2
CF Barcelona	4–3 (aet)	Club Atlético Bilbao

Source: RSSSF

Copa del Generalísimo
winners
CF Barcelona
9th title
