= UD Huesca =

Spanish football club

Huesca
- Full name: Unión Deportiva Huesca
- Founded: 1929
- Dissolved: 1956
- Ground: Campo de San Jorge, Huesca, Aragon, Spain
- Capacity: 2,000
Home colours

Unión Deportiva Huesca was a Spanish football club based in Huesca, in the autonomous community of Aragon.

== History ==
Founded in 1929 as CD Oscense, the club changed its name to CD Huesca in 1931 and played two seasons in Tercera División before the Spanish Civil War. In 1940, after a merger with CD Español, the club was named UD Huesca.

After seven seasons in Tercera, UD Huesca achieved promotion to Segunda División in 1950. After three seasons in the category, the club suffered relegation and subsequently folded in 1956.

Another club from the same city, SD Huesca, took UD Huesca's colours.

== Season to season ==
- As CD Huesca

Season	Tier	Division	Place	Copa del Rey
1929–30	6	3ª Reg.		
1930–31	5	2ª Reg.		
1931–32	4	1ª Reg.		
1932–33	3	3ª	2nd	
1933–34	3	3ª	2nd	
1934–1936	—	Regional	—	

- As UD Huesca

Season	Tier	Division	Place	Copa del Rey
1940–41	4	1ª Reg.	4th	
1941–42	4	1ª Reg.	6th	
1942–43	4	1ª Reg.	3rd	
1943–44	3	3ª	4th	Third round
1944–45	3	3ª	7th	
1945–46	3	3ª	6th	
1946–47	3	3ª	5th	
1947–48	3	3ª	1st	Second round

Season	Tier	Division	Place	Copa del Rey
1948–49	3	3ª	6th	First round
1949–50	3	3ª	1st	
1950–51	2	2ª	5th	
1951–52	2	2ª	11th	
1952–53	2	2ª	15th	First round
1953–54	3	3ª	2nd	
1954–55	3	3ª	9th	
1955–56	3	3ª	6th	

- 3 seasons in Segunda División
- 12 seasons in Tercera División
