= CD Logroñés =

Spanish football team (1940–2009)

Logroñés
- Full name: Club Deportivo Logroñés, S.A.D.
- Founded: 30 May 1940
- Dissolved: 7 August 2009
- Ground: Estadio Las Gaunas, Logroño, La Rioja, Spain
- Capacity: 16,000
- President: Juan Hortelano
- League: None
- 2008–09: 3ª – Group 16, (R)
Home colours	Away colours

Club Deportivo Logroñés, S.A.D. was a Spanish football team based in Logroño, in the autonomous community of La Rioja. Founded in 1940, it last played in Regional Preferente de La Rioja.

Due to financial problems, since 2009 the club has not played in any competition. The club, who appeared in nine La Liga seasons, was replaced by UD Logroñés and SD Logroñés.

== History ==
After Club Deportivo Logroño, the new Club Deportivo Logroñés saw the light of day after the Civil War, on 30 May 1940. Until 1950, it played in Tercera División, after which it achieved a second level promotion.

After falling short of reaching the top flight in 1952, Logroñés fluctuated between various levels of Spanish football. On 14 June 1987, already promoted Valencia CF visited Estadio Las Gaunas, and were defeated 1–0, as the Riojans gained first division rights for the first time ever.

In 1989–90, the team finished an all-time best seventh, just two points short of a UEFA Cup qualification, and would remain in the top level until 1997, save for a short return to level two in 1995–96, after it finished last the previous season with just 13 points.

After a double relegation in 1999–2000 (on the pitch and off it), it quickly returned to the third level, but new and worse economic problems arose, and the club was again relegated to Tercera in July 2004.

At the end of 2007–08, Logroñés returned once more to the fourth division due to its substantial salary commitments, in spite of the club's 13th-place finish in the season. Financial troubles continued into the first weeks of 2009, as only nine players took the field for its 4 January 2009 match against CD Arnedo, in protest against still overdue payments.

This was Logroñés' last match in the competition, as the side did not present itself at all for the next match, against CD Tedeón, and were therefore retired from the competition, being consequently relegated to Regional Preferente de La Rioja by the Royal Spanish Football Federation.

== Season to season ==
Season	Tier	Division	Place	Copa del Rey
1940–41	3	3ª	4th	
1941–42	3	1ª Reg.	1st	First round
1942–43	3	1ª Reg.	1st	
1943–44	3	3ª	1st	
1944–45	3	3ª	4th	
1945–46	3	3ª	2nd	
1946–47	3	3ª	3rd	
1947–48	3	3ª	4th	Fourth round
1948–49	3	3ª	4th	First round
1949–50	3	3ª	2nd	
1950–51	2	2ª	10th	
1951–52	2	2ª	2nd	
1952–53	2	2ª	5th	Second round
1953–54	2	2ª	10th	
1954–55	2	2ª	5th	
1955–56	2	2ª	16th	
1956–57	2	2ª	17th	
1957–58	3	3ª	3rd	
1958–59	3	3ª	1st	
1959–60	3	3ª	4th	

Season	Tier	Division	Place	Copa del Rey
1960–61	3	3ª	6th	
1961–62	3	3ª	2nd	
1962–63	3	3ª	3rd	
1963–64	3	3ª	3rd	
1964–65	3	3ª	4th	
1965–66	3	3ª	1st	
1966–67	2	2ª	15th	First round
1967–68	3	3ª	8th	
1968–69	3	3ª	3rd	
1969–70	3	3ª	1st	Second round
1970–71	2	2ª	15th	Round of 16
1971–72	2	2ª	6th	Fifth round
1972–73	2	2ª	17th	Fifth round
1973–74	3	3ª	3rd	Third round
1974–75	3	3ª	3rd	First round
1975–76	3	3ª	2nd	First round
1976–77	3	3ª	13th	First round
1977–78	4	3ª	1st	First round
1978–79	3	2ª B	11th	Second round
1979–80	3	2ª B	10th	Round of 16

Season	Tier	Division	Place	Copa del Rey
1980–81	3	2ª B	6th	Third round
1981–82	3	2ª B	5th	Second round
1982–83	3	2ª B	7th	Third round
1983–84	3	2ª B	2nd	Second round
1984–85	2	2ª	6th	Third round
1985–86	2	2ª	16th	Fourth round
1986–87	2	2ª	2nd	Quarterfinals
1987–88	1	1ª	13th	Fourth round
1988–89	1	1ª	14th	Round of 32
1989–90	1	1ª	7th	First round
1990–91	1	1ª	10th	Quarterfinals
1991–92	1	1ª	10th	Quarterfinals
1992–93	1	1ª	15th	Fourth round
1993–94	1	1ª	16th	Round of 16
1994–95	1	1ª	20th	Third round

Season	Tier	Division	Place	Copa del Rey
1995–96	2	2ª	2nd	Second round
1996–97	1	1ª	22nd	Third round
1997–98	2	2ª	18th	First round
1998–99	2	2ª	16th	Second round
1999–2000	2	2ª	20th	Second round
2000–01	4	3ª	1st	Round of 64
2001–02	3	2ª B	10th	Round of 32
2002–03	3	2ª B	3rd	
2003–04	3	2ª B	15th	First round
2004–05	4	3ª	3rd	
2005–06	4	3ª	2nd	
2006–07	3	2ª B	14th	
2007–08	3	2ª B	13th	
2008–09	4	3ª	(R)	

- 9 seasons in La Liga
- 18 seasons in Segunda División
- 11 seasons in Segunda División B
- 29 seasons in Tercera División

== Famous coaches ==
- (Spain) Javier Irureta
- (Spain) Miguel Ángel Lotina
- (Spain) Víctor Muñoz
- (Spain) Juande Ramos
- (Spain) Quique Setién
- (Serbia) Blagoje Paunović
