= 1943–44 Tercera División =

Tercera División
- Season: 1943–44

The 1943–44 Tercera División was the eighth edition of the Spanish third national tier. The competition was divided into 2 phases.

== League tables ==
=== Group I ===
Pos	Team	Pld	W	D	L	GF	GA	GD	Pts
1	Racing de Ferrol	18	13	1	4	50	19	+31	27
2	Berbés	18	11	2	5	36	26	+10	24
3	Fábrica Nacional	18	10	3	5	39	21	+18	23
4	Pontevedra	18	8	4	6	30	24	+6	20
5	Santiago	18	8	2	8	32	33	−1	18
6	Lucense	18	8	1	9	49	43	+6	17
7	Orensana	18	6	3	9	27	37	−10	15
8	Betanzos	18	5	3	10	32	47	−15	13
9	Lemos	18	5	2	11	23	43	−20	12
10	Ponferradina	18	5	1	12	35	60	−25	11

=== Group II ===
Pos	Team	Pld	W	D	L	GF	GA	GD	Pts
1	Racing de Santander	18	12	2	4	71	31	+40	26
2	Oriamendi	18	11	1	6	47	35	+12	23
3	Burgos	18	10	2	6	34	25	+9	22
4	Real Avilés	18	9	4	5	31	29	+2	22
5	Gimnástica de Torrelavega	18	9	3	6	35	35	0	21
6	Juvencia	18	8	3	7	31	30	+1	19
7	Barreda	18	7	4	7	36	37	−1	18
8	Langreano	18	5	5	8	28	42	−14	15
9	La Felguera	18	4	2	12	23	42	−19	10
10	Tánagra	18	1	2	15	23	53	−30	4

=== Group III ===
Pos	Team	Pld	W	D	L	GF	GA	GD	Pts
1	Logroñés	18	15	0	3	57	20	+37	30
2	Alavés	18	14	0	4	38	20	+18	28
3	Indautxu	18	11	2	5	57	27	+30	24
4	Erandio	18	10	4	4	32	20	+12	24
5	Sestao	18	8	5	5	48	32	+16	21
6	Tudelano	18	7	3	8	42	41	+1	17
7	Tolosa	18	5	4	9	29	51	−22	14
8	Vasconia San Sebastián	18	6	0	12	24	34	−10	12
9	Izarra	18	1	3	14	8	56	−48	5
10	Real Unión	18	1	3	14	16	50	−34	5

=== Group IV ===
Pos	Team	Pld	W	D	L	GF	GA	GD	Pts
1	Mallorca	18	12	2	4	34	19	+15	26
2	Gimnàstic de Tarragona	18	10	3	5	49	25	+24	23
3	Reus	18	9	4	5	33	25	+8	22
4	Terrassa	18	9	2	7	43	36	+7	20
5	Girona	18	6	8	4	26	22	+4	20
6	Martinenc	18	8	3	7	40	31	+9	19
7	Granollers	18	5	5	8	25	33	−8	15
8	Atlético Baleares	18	6	2	10	28	37	−9	14
9	Lleida	18	3	5	10	28	51	−23	11
10	Figueres	18	2	6	10	18	45	−27	10

=== Group V ===
==== Aragón ====
Pos	Team	Pld	W	D	L	GF	GA	GD	Pts
1	Atlético Zaragoza	8	4	3	1	20	12	+8	11
2	Arenas de Zaragoza	8	4	2	2	14	12	+2	10
3	Teruel	8	3	2	3	19	15	+4	8
4	Huesca	8	2	2	4	15	18	−3	6
5	Español del Arrabal	8	1	3	4	12	23	−11	5

==== Valencia ====
Pos	Team	Pld	W	D	L	GF	GA	GD	Pts
1	Levante	14	9	4	1	47	17	+30	22
2	Carcaixent	14	7	3	4	33	23	+10	17
3	Olímpic de Xàtiva	14	6	4	4	26	27	−1	16
4	Acero	14	7	1	6	23	31	−8	15
5	Nules	14	6	2	6	31	27	+4	14
6	Sueca	14	4	4	6	27	27	0	12
7	Ontinyent	14	3	3	8	17	35	−18	9
8	Torrent	14	2	3	9	21	38	−17	7

===== Group V Final =====
Team 1	Agg.	Team 2	1st leg	2nd leg
Atlético Zaragoza	0–5	Levante	0–1	0–4

=== Group VI ===
Pos	Team	Pld	W	D	L	GF	GA	GD	Pts
1	Cacereño	18	12	4	2	50	26	+24	28
2	Badajoz	18	12	3	3	48	14	+34	27
3	Salamanca	18	10	2	6	40	30	+10	22
4	Trujillo	18	8	6	4	28	22	+6	22
5	Imperio Madrid	18	8	2	8	33	32	+1	18
6	Alcalá	18	6	5	7	29	33	−4	17
7	Toledo	18	8	1	9	37	39	−2	17
8	Ferroviaria	18	5	3	10	31	44	−13	13
9	Manchego	18	6	0	12	28	51	−23	12
10	Emeritense	18	1	2	15	21	54	−33	4

=== Group VII ===
Pos	Team	Pld	W	D	L	GF	GA	GD	Pts
1	Elche	18	16	0	2	59	12	+47	32
2	Albacete	18	10	4	4	45	24	+21	24
3	Eldense	18	12	0	6	44	25	+19	24
4	Alicante	18	9	3	6	38	23	+15	21
5	Cartagena	18	8	3	7	37	34	+3	19
6	Crevillente	18	8	1	9	38	31	+7	17
7	Cieza	18	6	2	10	27	48	−21	14
8	Almansa	18	5	3	10	30	33	−3	13
9	Imperial	18	4	3	11	27	50	−23	11
10	Lorca	18	1	3	14	9	74	−65	5

=== Group VIII ===
Pos	Team	Pld	W	D	L	GF	GA	GD	Pts
1	Málaga	18	15	1	2	51	13	+38	31
2	Real Jaén	18	9	5	4	31	24	+7	23
3	Córdoba	18	9	3	6	39	28	+11	21
4	Coria	18	7	4	7	27	21	+6	18
5	Atlético Tetuán	18	7	4	7	33	33	0	18
6	Recreativo de Huelva	18	5	5	8	36	41	−5	15
7	Algeciras	18	6	3	9	37	45	−8	15
8	Linares	18	5	4	9	33	38	−5	14
9	Balompédica Linense	18	4	5	9	25	44	−19	13
10	Hércules de Cádiz	18	4	4	10	20	45	−25	12

== Promotion playoff ==
=== First round ===
==== Group I ====
Pos	Team	Pld	W	D	L	GF	GA	GD	Pts
1	Racing de Santander	6	5	0	1	15	6	+9	10
2	Racing de Ferrol	6	3	0	3	8	11	−3	6
3	Cacereño	6	2	1	3	15	13	+2	5
4	Logroñés	6	1	1	4	6	14	−8	3

==== Group II ====
Pos	Team	Pld	W	D	L	GF	GA	GD	Pts
1	Mallorca	6	3	3	0	5	2	+3	9
2	Levante	6	3	2	1	12	8	+4	8
3	Málaga	6	1	4	1	6	5	+1	6
4	Elche	6	0	1	5	5	13	−8	1

=== Final Round ===
Team 1	Score	Team 2
Barakaldo	3–2	Levante
Arenas de Getxo	0–1	Racing de Ferrol

== Relegation playoff ==
=== First round ===
Team 1	Agg.	Team 2	1st leg	2nd leg
Maestranza	2–1	Durango	0–0	2–1
España Industrial	5–8	Júpiter	3–4	2–4
Mediodía	5–3	Constancia Plasencia	5–1	0–2
Electromecanicas	2–5	Melilla	2–0	0–5

=== Final Round ===
Team 1	Agg.	Team 2	1st leg	2nd leg
Turista	3–7	Ponferradina	2–2	1–5
Júpiter Leonés	1–4	Tánagra	1–1	0–3
Maestranza	7–1	Real Unión	2–1	5–0
Júpiter	5–4	Figueres	3–0	2–4
Mediodía	4–3	Emeritense	4–1	0–2
Gimnástica Abad	9–2	Lorca	8–1	1–1
Melilla	5–2	Hércules de Cádiz	3–1	2–1
Malvarrosa	5–1	Torrent	5–1	–
