= Alfonso Sanz =

Spanish footballer (1915-2001)

Personal information
- Full name: Alfonso Sanz Jorge
- Date of birth: 18 January 1915
- Place of birth: Madrid, Spain
- Date of death: 25 July 2001 (aged 86)
- Place of death: Spain
- Position: Forward

Senior career*
Years	Team	Apps	(Gls)
1932–1933	Athletic Bilbao		
1933–1936	Nacional de Madrid		
1940–1943	Real Madrid	9	(4)
1944–1945	Ceuta		
1945–1947	Ferroviaria		
Total		9	(4)
- * Club domestic league appearances and goals

Alfonso Sanz Jorge (18 January 1915 – 25 July 2001) was a Spanish footballer who played as a forward for Real Madrid.

== Playing career ==
Alfonso Sanz was born on 18 January 1915 in Madrid, but it was in Bilbao where he began his football career, joining the ranks of Athletic Bilbao in 1932, aged 17, with whom he only played a single match, a friendly against Erandio Club on 4 September 1932, which ended in a 0–4 loss. At the end of the season, he returned to the capital, where he joined the ranks of second division team Nacional de Madrid, with whom he played for three years, until 1936, when the Spanish Civil War broke out.

Once the conflict was over, Sanz was signed by Real Madrid, whose squad was still recovering from the Civil War, and in only his second league match for the club, he netted a first-half brace against Valencia. He went on to score a goal in each of his next two appearances, a 3–0 victory over Hércules and a consolation goal in a 1–4 loss to Athletic Aviación. He played with the Merengue club for three years, scoring a total of five goals in 11 official matches, including 4 goals in 9 La Liga matches.

After a brief stint at Ceuta in the 1944–45 season, Sanz once again returned to the capital, this time to Ferroviaria, which he helped win back-to-back Spanish Amateur Championship in 1946 and 1947, beating Mestalla (3–2) and Indautxu (2–0) in the final, respectively.

== Death ==
Sanz died on 25 July 2001, at the age of 86.
