= CD Manchego =

Spanish football team

Manchego
- Full name: Club Deportivo Manchego
- Founded: 1929
- Dissolved: 2000
- Ground: Juan Carlos I, Ciudad Real, Castile-La Mancha, Spain
- Capacity: 2,900
- 1999–2000: Segunda División B – Group 4, 11th of 20
Home colours	Away colours

Club Deportivo Manchego was a Spanish football team based in Ciudad Real in the namesake province, in the autonomous community of Castile-La Mancha. Founded in 1929 and dissolved in 2000, Its successor was Manchego CF and later CD Ciudad Real, that was renamed again as Manchego in 2016.

== Season to season ==
Season	Tier	Division	Place	Copa del Rey
1929–1940	—	Regional	—	
1943–44	3	3ª	9th	
1944–45	3	3ª	3rd	
1945–46	3	3ª	4th	
1946–47	3	3ª	7th	
1947–48	3	3ª	12th	
1948–49	3	3ª	12th	
1949–50	3	3ª	4th	
1950–51	3	3ª	4th	
1951–52	3	3ª	3rd	
1952–53	3	3ª	4th	
1953–54	3	3ª	8th	
1954–55	3	3ª	3rd	
1955–56	3	3ª	5th	
1956–57	3	3ª	3rd	
1957–58	3	3ª	2nd	
1958–59	3	3ª	4th	
1959–60	3	3ª	1st	
1960–61	3	3ª	8th	
1961–62	3	3ª	2nd	

Season	Tier	Division	Place	Copa del Rey
1962–63	3	3ª	11th	
1963–64	3	3ª	7th	
1964–65	3	3ª	7th	
1965–66	3	3ª	3rd	
1966–67	3	3ª	4th	
1967–68	3	3ª	6th	
1968–69	3	3ª	10th	
1969–70	3	3ª	13th	
1970–71	4	Reg. Pref.	3rd	
1971–72	4	Reg. Pref.	4th	
1972–73	4	Reg. Pref.	4th	
1973–74	4	Reg. Pref.	5th	
1974–75	4	Reg. Pref.	2nd	
1975–76	4	Reg. Pref.	8th	
1976–77	4	Reg. Pref.	7th	
1977–78	4	3ª	3rd	
1978–79	4	3ª	14th	
1979–80	4	3ª	4th	
1980–81	4	3ª	3rd	
1981–82	4	3ª	3rd	

Season	Tier	Division	Place	Copa del Rey
1982–83	4	3ª	2nd	
1983–84	4	3ª	3rd	
1984–85	4	3ª	15th	
1985–86	4	3ª	11th	
1986–87	4	3ª	13th	
1987–88	4	3ª	18th	
1988–89	5	Reg. Pref.	9th	
1989–90	5	Reg. Pref.	8th	
1990–91	5	Reg. Pref.	13th	

Season	Tier	Division	Place	Copa del Rey
1991–92	5	Reg. Pref.	1st	
1992–93	4	3ª	3rd	
1993–94	4	3ª	1st	
1994–95	3	2ª B	20th	
1995–96	4	3ª	2nd	
1996–97	3	2ª B	3rd	
1997–98	3	2ª B	10th	
1998–99	3	2ª B	13th	
1999–2000	3	2ª B	11th	

- 5 seasons in Segunda División B
- 41 seasons in Tercera División

== Grounds ==
- Campo de la Puerta de Granada (1929–1939)
- Campo del Regimiento de Artillería (1939–1943)
- Campo de la Puerta de Granada (1943–1947)
- Campo de la Puerta de Santa María (1947–1971)
- Estadio Rey Juan Carlos I (1971–2000)
