= 1940–41 Tercera División =

Tercera División
- Season: 1940–41
- Promoted: Alavés; Constància; Ferroviaria; Ceuta; Elche
- Matches: 72
- Goals: 319 (4.43 per match)
- Biggest home win: Alavés 12–0 Erandio (5 January 1941)
- Biggest away win: Rochapeano 1–12 Ferroviaria (12 January 1941)
- Highest scoring: Rochapeano 1–12 Ferroviaria (12 January 1941)

The 1940–41 Tercera División was the seventh season of the Tercera Division since its establishment.

== League tables ==
=== Group A1 ===
Pos	Team	Pld	W	D	L	GF	GA	GD	Pts
1	Langreano	6	5	0	1	10	6	+4	10
2	Gimnástica de Torrelavega	6	2	2	2	14	11	+3	6
3	Vigués	6	2	2	2	13	11	+2	6
4	Real Juvencia	6	1	0	5	12	21	−9	2

=== Group A2 ===
Pos	Team	Pld	W	D	L	GF	GA	GD	Pts
1	Alavés	6	5	1	0	31	7	+24	11
2	Sestao	6	3	2	1	14	10	+4	8
3	Erandio	6	2	1	3	11	22	−11	5
4	Logroñés	6	0	0	6	4	21	−17	0

=== Group A3 ===
Pos	Team	Pld	W	D	L	GF	GA	GD	Pts
1	Ferroviaria	6	4	1	1	28	6	+22	9
2	Alcalá	6	3	1	2	18	10	+8	7
3	Discóbolo	6	3	0	3	10	9	+1	6
4	Rochapeano	6	1	0	5	6	37	−31	2

=== Group B1 ===
Pos	Team	Pld	W	D	L	GF	GA	GD	Pts
1	Constància	6	6	0	0	12	4	+8	12
2	Sant Andreu	6	4	0	2	10	7	+3	8
3	Granollers	6	2	0	4	8	9	−1	4
4	Vic	6	0	0	6	4	14	−10	0

=== Group B2 ===
Pos	Team	Pld	W	D	L	GF	GA	GD	Pts
1	Elche	6	4	0	2	24	15	+9	8
2	Olímpic de Xàtiva	6	3	1	2	12	14	−2	7
3	Catarroja	6	2	1	3	15	20	−5	5
4	Alicante	6	2	0	4	11	13	−2	4

=== Group B3 ===
Pos	Team	Pld	W	D	L	GF	GA	GD	Pts
1	Ceuta	6	5	0	1	19	12	+7	10
2	Onuba	6	3	1	2	14	6	+8	7
3	Badajoz	6	2	1	3	9	12	−3	5
4	Balompédica Linense	6	1	0	5	10	22	−12	2

== Promotion playoff ==
=== Group A ===
Pos	Team	Pld	W	D	L	GF	GA	GD	Pts
1	Alavés	4	3	0	1	11	3	+8	6
2	Ferroviaria	4	2	0	2	8	8	0	4
3	Langreano	4	1	0	3	6	14	−8	2

=== Group B ===
Pos	Team	Pld	W	D	L	GF	GA	GD	Pts
1	Constància	4	2	1	1	9	6	+3	5
2	Ceuta	4	2	0	2	7	11	−4	4
3	Elche	4	1	1	2	9	8	+1	3

=== Relegation Playoff ===
Team 1	Score	Team 2
Barakaldo	4–3	Langreano
Elche	1–0	Real Córdoba
