= CD Acero =

Spanish football team

Acero
- Full name: Club Deportivo Acero
- Founded: 1919
- Ground: El Fornàs, Sagunto, Valencia, Spain
- Capacity: 2,500
- Chairman: José Manuel Gil
- Manager: Rubén Furió
- League: Tercera Federación – Group 6
- 2025–26: Lliga Comunitat – North, 1st of 16 (champions)
- Website: www.cdacero.com
Home colours	Away colours

Club Deportivo Acero (often shortened to CDA or CD Acero, 'Steel Sporting Club' in Spanish) is a Spanish football team based in Puerto de Sagunto (an urban nucleus in Sagunto), in the Valencian Community, Spain. Founded in 1919 it plays in Tercera Federación – Group 6, holding home games at Estadio El Fornàs, which has a capacity of 4,500 spectators.

== History ==
Football reached Sagunto city when the Basque sailors who docked at the commercial port played the game with the locals. In 1919 Sporting Club was founded, bringing the colors of the Athletic Club in honor of the steel company. In the early 1920s the club began to play against such popular teams, like Valencia CF or Levante UD, thus developing in a more professional way.

After the Spanish Civil War, the use of foreign idioms was forbidden, so the football team was renamed to Club Deportivo Acero.

=== Club background ===
- Sporting Club Canet (1919–1932)
- Sporting Club Puerto Sagunto (1932–1940)
- Club Deportivo Acero (1940–)

== Seasons ==
Season	Tier	Division	Place	Copa del Rey
1928–29	5	2ª Reg.	1st	
1929–30	3	3ª	1st	
1930–31	3	3ª	1st	
1931–32	4	1ª Reg.	6th	
1932–33	4	1ª Reg.	6th	
1933–34	5	2ª Reg.		
1934–35	5	2ª Reg.		
1935–36	5	2ª Reg.		
1939–40	5	2ª Reg.		
1940–41	5	2ª Reg.	1st	
1941–42	3	1ª Reg.	6th	
1942–43	3	1ª Reg.	2nd	
1943–44	3	3ª	4th	Fourth round
1944–45	4	1ª Reg.	5th	
1945–46	3	3ª	6th	
1946–47	3	3ª	7th	
1947–48	3	3ª	6th	First round
1948–49	3	3ª	9th	First round
1949–50	3	3ª	17th	
1950–51	4	1ª Reg.	2nd	

Season	Tier	Division	Place	Copa del Rey
1951–52	4	1ª Reg.	6th	
1952–53	4	1ª Reg.	3rd	
1953–54	4	1ª Reg.	11th	
1954–55	4	1ª Reg.	1st	
1955–56	3	3ª	9th	
1956–57	3	3ª	8th	
1957–58	3	3ª	13th	
1958–59	3	3ª	17th	
1959–60	4	1ª Reg.	2nd	
1960–61	3	3ª	9th	
1961–62	3	3ª	8th	
1962–63	3	3ª	13th	
1963–64	3	3ª	3rd	
1964–65	3	3ª	7th	
1965–66	3	3ª	5th	
1966–67	3	3ª	5th	
1967–68	3	3ª	4th	
1968–69	3	3ª	4th	
1969–70	3	3ª	7th	
1970–71	3	3ª	15th	

Season	Tier	Division	Place	Copa del Rey
1971–72	3	3ª	15th	
1972–73	3	3ª	20th	
1973–74	4	Reg. Pref.	4th	
1974–75	4	Reg. Pref.	4th	
1975–76	4	Reg. Pref.	1st	
1976–77	3	3ª	20th	
1977–78	4	3ª	14th	First round
1978–79	4	3ª	16th	Second round
1979–80	4	3ª	4th	First round
1980–81	4	3ª	20th	First round
1981–82	5	Reg. Pref.	16th	
1982–83	5	Reg. Pref.	10th	
1983–84	5	Reg. Pref.	18th	
1984–85	5	Reg. Pref.	15th	
1985–86	5	Reg. Pref.	17th	
1986–87	5	Reg. Pref.	4th	
1987–88	4	3ª	15th	
1988–89	4	3ª	13th	
1989–90	4	3ª	13th	
1990–91	4	3ª	10th	

Season	Tier	Division	Place	Copa del Rey
1991–92	4	3ª	8th	
1992–93	5	Reg. Pref.	8th	
1993–94	5	Reg. Pref.	8th	
1994–95	5	Reg. Pref.	1st	
1995–96	4	3ª	2nd	
1996–97	4	3ª	10th	
1997–98	4	3ª	19th	
1998–99	5	Reg. Pref.	2nd	
1999–2000	5	Reg. Pref.	4th	
2000–01	5	Reg. Pref.	1st	
2001–02	5	Reg. Pref.	6th	
2002–03	5	Reg. Pref.	4th	
2003–04	5	Reg. Pref.	2nd	
2004–05	4	3ª	20th	
2005–06	5	Reg. Pref.	5th	
2006–07	5	Reg. Pref.	7th	
2007–08	5	Reg. Pref.	4th	
2008–09	5	Reg. Pref.	9th	
2009–10	5	Reg. Pref.	12th	
2010–11	5	Reg. Pref.	1st	

Season	Tier	Division	Place	Copa del Rey
2011–12	4	3ª	5th	
2012–13	4	3ª	17th	
2013–14	4	3ª	10th	
2014–15	4	3ª	12th	
2015–16	4	3ª	20th	
2016–17	5	Reg. Pref.	3rd	
2017–18	5	Reg. Pref.	1st	
2018–19	4	3ª	17th	
2019–20	4	3ª	18th	
2020–21	4	3ª	9th / 2nd	
2021–22	5	3ª RFEF	4th	
2022–23	5	3ª Fed.	12th	
2023–24	5	3ª Fed.	16th	
2024–25	6	Lliga Com.	4th	
2025–26	6	Lliga Com.	1st	
2026–27	5	3ª Fed.		

- 47 seasons in Tercera División
- 4 seasons in Tercera Federación/Tercera División RFEF
