= 1944 Copa del Generalísimo =

42nd Copa del Rey

Tournament details
- Country: Spain
- Teams: 128

Final positions
- Champions: Atlético de Bilbao (15th title)
- Runners-up: Valencia CF

Tournament statistics
- Matches played: 167

The 1944 Copa del Generalísimo was the 42nd staging of the Copa del Rey, the Spanish football cup competition.

The competition began on 20 February 1944 and concluded on 25 June 1944 with the final, where Atlético de Bilbao won their 15th title.

== First round ==
Team 1	Score	Team 2
UD Orensana	3–0	Club Lemos
Club Berbés	4–1	Club Turista
Pontevedra CF	2–1	Club Santiago
SG Lucense	4–1	Club Betanzos
SD Ponferradina	3–0	CD Leonés
Club Langreano	2–1	CP La Felguera
Real Juvencia	3–1	RD Oriamendi
CD Tánagra	6–1	Real Avilés Club de Fútbol
Gimnástica de Torrelavega	2–2	SD Barreda Balompié
Gimnástica D. Burgalesa	1–2	CDFN Palencia
Deportivo Alavés	4–0	Tolosa CF
CD Vasconia	3–1	Real Unión Club
CD Izarra	2–7	Maestr. Aérea Logroño
CD Tudelano	3–3	CD Oberena
UD Huesca	2–1	SD Escoriaza
UD Teruel	2–0	Español Arrabal
CF Trujillo	1–3	SD Emeritense
Atlético Baleares	3–1	España de Lluchmayor
UD Salamanca	1–1	AD Ferroviaria

- Tiebreaker

Team 1	Score	Team 2
SD Barreda Balompié	0–0	Gimnástica de Torrelavega
AD Ferroviaria	6–2	UD Salamanca
Gimnástica de Torrelavega	0–1	SD Barreda Balompié

== Fourth round ==
Team 1	Agg.	Team 2	1st leg	2nd leg
CD Palencia	2–1	Berbés CF	2–0	0–1
CD Tanagra	1–5	CD Alavés	1–2	0–3
CD Teruel	4–3	UD Lérida	4–0	0–3
CD Júpiter	1–8	Gimnástico de Tarragona	1–6	0–2
CD Badajoz	1–2	Onuba CF	1–0	0–2
Unión Olímpica Jiennense	1–3	RCD Córdoba	1–1	0–2
Imperio CF	6–3	CD Acero	5–0	1–3
Imperial CF	3–6	Albacete Balompié	3–1	0–5

== Fifth round ==
Team 1	Agg.	Team 2	1st leg	2nd leg
CD Palencia	5–3	CD Alavés	5–0	0–3
Gimnástico de Tarragona	4–1	CD Teruel	3–0	1–1
Imperio CF	1–4	Albacete Balompié	0–2	1–2
RCD Córdoba	5–2	Onuba CF	4–0	1–2

== Sixth round ==
Team 1	Agg.	Team 2	1st leg	2nd leg
CD Palencia	3–4	Gimnástico de Tarragona	2–1	1–3
Albacete Balompié	3–6	RCD Córdoba	1–0	2–6

== Round of 32 ==
Team 1	Agg.	Team 2	1st leg	2nd leg
Cultural Leonesa	3–7	RC Celta	2–2	1–5
Real Oviedo	8–4	Real Santander	8–1	0–3
Real Valladolid	1–7	Deportivo La Coruña	0–0	1–7
Arenas Club	5–4	Real Gijón	2–0	3–4
Baracaldo CF	3–4	Club Atlético de Bilbao	1–0	2–4
CA Osasuna	2–5	Real Sociedad	1–3	1–2
Real Zaragoza	3–7	Valencia CF	3–2	0–5
RCD Español	2–2	Gimnástico de Tarragona	2–1	0–1
CD Sabadell CF	6–3	RCD Mallorca	6–2	0–1
CD Constancia	1–4	CF Barcelona	0–0	1–4
CD Castellón	5–3	CD Alcoyano	3–0	2–3
Hércules CF	0–3	Real Murcia	0–1	0–2
Real Madrid CF	8–3	Real Betis Balompié	4–2	4–1
RCD Córdoba	4–10	Club Atlético de Aviación	2–3	2–7
Sevilla CF	4–1	Jerez CF	3–0	1–1
SD Ceuta	4–5	Granada CF	3–3	1–2

Source: RSSSF

- Tiebreaker

Team 1	Score	Team 2
RCD Español	2–1	Gimnástico de Tarragona

== Round of 16 ==
Team 1	Agg.	Team 2	1st leg	2nd leg
Club Atlético de Aviación	6–3	RC Celta	4–0	2–3
Granada CF	2–0	Real Madrid CF	0–0	2–0
RCD Español	3–2	Real Sociedad	2–1	1–1
Valencia CF	6–2	Deportivo La Coruña	2–0	4–2
Sevilla CF	6–3	CF Barcelona	5–2	1–1
Real Murcia	4–3	Real Oviedo	1–2	3–1
Arenas Club	1–10	Club Atlético de Bilbao	1–6	1–4
CD Castellón	2–4	CD Sabadell CF	0–1	2–3

Source: RSSSF

== Quarter-finals ==
Team 1	Agg.	Team 2	1st leg	2nd leg
Sevilla CF	3–5	Club Atlético de Aviación	3–2	0–3
Club Atlético de Bilbao	6–2	Granada CF	6–1	0–1
Real Murcia CF	7–4	RCD Español	5–2	2–2
CD Sabadell CF	2–8	Valencia CF	1–2	1–6

Source: RSSSF

== Semi-finals ==
Team 1	Agg.	Team 2	1st leg	2nd leg
Club Atlético de Aviación	3–3	Club Atlético de Bilbao	3–1	0–2
Valencia CF	8–1	Real Murcia CF	3–0	5–1

Source: RSSSF

- Tiebreaker

Team 1	Score	Team 2
Club Atlético de Aviación	2–3	Club Atlético de Bilbao

== Final ==
Team 1	Score	Team 2
Atlético de Bilbao	2–0	Valencia CF

Copa del Generalísimo
winners
Atlético de Bilbao
15th title
