= SD Erandio Club =

Coordinates: 43.3007°N 2.9717°W

- Full name: Sociedad Deportiva; Erandio Club
- Nicknames: Albiazules, Auriazules, Erandiotarras
- Founded: 1915; 111 years ago
- Ground: Nuevo Ategorri, Erandio, Basque Country, Spain
- Capacity: 2,500
- Chairman: Marina García Franco
- Manager: Josué Atela Llona
- League: Tercera Federación – Group 4
- 2025–26: División de Honor, 1st of 18 (champions)
- Website: www.erandioclub.com
Home colours	Away colours

Sociedad Deportiva Erandio Club is a football club from the Basque Country, from the city of Erandio in Biscay (Spain). The club was officially founded in 1915, and play in Tercera Federación – Group 4, though have played twice in the Spanish second division.

Erandio Club are well known as a traditional club, both within and outside of Biscay. The white and blue club is one of the few in the province whose name has appeared in the select list of champions in the Spanish state, despite their best times being back in the 1930s, 1940s and early 1950s. However, they have always been within the parameters of a very modest club. One of the key characteristics of Erandio is that all of their teams have been formed by amateur players.

The club's record is excellent, and the list of players who went on to play in the First Division reinforce this. Juanín, Ipiña, Pitxi Garizurieta, Arqueta, Zarra, Venancio, José Luis Garay, José Luis Bilbao Bala Negra (Black Bullet), Higinio Ortúzar, Alejandro Bilbao and Sertutxa played for the team at various times. Other players such as Juan Ramón and Basauri (Valencia), Terín Álvarez (Racing de Santander), Lorenzo Fernández Learra Lorín (Racing, Zaragoza, Montpellier and Nîmes from the 1st French division, then trained and played in the Bañols of the 3rd division), J.L. Perez Tokilla (Oviedo and Deportivo), Pedro María Herrera (Salamanca, Celta and Zaragoza), Toni Gorriaran (Oviedo and Alavés) and Savin Bilbao (Deportivo de la Coruña) were also invaluable to Erandio's contribution to the football elite

== History ==
Erandio club was incorporated in early 1915, though the team had been playing informally since around 1913. It played in the North Regional League, in the Second Division, until 1918. In 1916 the club acquired its own land for its pitch and opened Ategorri field in 1918.

Between 1922 and 1927, the club had a difficult time and relegated to amateur leagues, but in the early 1930s it performed well in the amateur leagues, claiming regional championships and performing well nationally. After the civil war, Spanish football and the club saw restructuring and reformation. In this period, Telmo Zarra played for them. The club won championships regularly in the early forties, and by 1949 it reached the Spanish Second Division. At the end of the 1949–1950 season, however, the club descended from the Second Division and also lost their field. Erandio played in borrowed fields until it opened New Ategorri field on 13 October 1967.

For most of the seventies, Erandio played in the Regional Preferente. In the 1980–1981 season, the Eerandio reached the highest point of its history achieving the ascension to Segunda B. The seventh place achieved during their 1981-1982 debut marked their best classification in the new category. The team, however, was unable to maintain its performance and was relegated to Third Division in 1984–1985. Since 1985, the club has stayed low, remaining in the Third Division (1985-1988/1992-1994), the División de Honor (1988-1992/1994-), and the Preferente Territorial from 2007 to 2011.

In October 2010, an assembly approved the municipalization of all of the club's properties, notably the historic Ategorri Soccer Field. The team was unable to afford the maintenance of the field due to low attendance.

On 14 May 2011, the Erandio achieved to return to the División de Honor after four seasons by winning 4–1 to Padura.

After three seasons in the División de Honor, Erandio during the 2013–2014 season finished in second position and promoting against Tolosa and San Inazio (Álava) winning said promotion and occupying the vacancy of the Laudio, which descended due to being unable to pay dues to the federation.

Erandio, after twenty years, in the 2014–2015 season competed in its centenary in the Group IV of the Tercera División. In that same season after a bad run of results, Erandio Club descended to the División de Honor. At the end of the season, a game of veterans was played commemorative of the club centenary against a veteran team of the Athletic Club. Among which was players like Imanol, Armando, Lakabeg, Casas, Ocio, J. Etxeberria, J. González y Gabilondo. On 27 August 2015, the club published a book with the history of 100 years of the club. On 7 December 2015, the TV show "El día después" of Canal+ rebroadcast a report of the centenary of the club.

In 2017, the club received recognition from the Basque Government for its value to the Basque community.

== Symbology ==
=== Shield ===
In the shield of Erandio Club the top-left margin contains one sphere and in the top-right vertical blue bars and the cross of St. Andrew. The rest of the shield is covered by blue vertical bars tilted to the right, and the center contains the initials E and C from Erandio Club.

=== Mascot ===
The Erandio Club mascot is Kai, which comes from Basque kaio which means "seagull". Their appearance is of a seagull wearing a beret and wears the main shirt of Erandio Club.

=== Uniform ===
The first kit consists of a blue-striped shirt, blue shorts and blue socks with white trim.

As for the away kit has traditionally consisted of a red shirt with blue and white trim with blue shorts and blue socks stockings with white trim. Currently, they wear a red shirt with white piping on the shoulders and neck with red pants and stockings of the same color

=== Anthem ===
¡Aupa Erandio!, Composed in 1965 on the occasion of the Golden Jubilee of the Society Foundations, Pablo Martinez Ibarruri composed the lyrics of the anthem dedicated to the club. the musical composition was the work of master Rodrigo A. Santiago. The chorus Otxote Txipli Txapla recorded for the first time the anthem on CD.

¡ AUPA ERANDIO !
¡Alirón, alirón, el Erandio Campeón!

¡Aupa Erandio! tu grito famoso
lo lanzamos por plazas y calles.
¡Aupa Erandio! tu grito animoso
lleva en sí un impulso triunfal.

Él se extiende por montes y valles
cabalgando el corcel de tu historia,
y pregona tu fama y la gloría
de tu juego brioso y genial.

¡Alirón, alirón, el Erandio Campeón!

¡Aupa Erandio! Pon tesón
que tus once jugadores
¡Aupa Erandio!
por defender tus colores
tocaran el alirón.

¡Aupa Erandio! Pon tesón
que tus once triunfadores
¡Aupa Erandio!
por defenderán tus colores
y seras el campeón.

¡Alirón, alirón, el Erandio Campeón!

== Organization 2015/19 ==
=== Board of Directors ===
Charge	Name
President	(Spain) Marina Garcia Franco
Deputy President	(Spain) Julio Puertas Losa
Vice President	(Spain) Jose Ricardo Morales Diaz
Treasurer	(Spain) Koldo Obregon Arisqueta
Secretary	(Spain) Txetxu Aurrekoetxea Urkixo
Vocals	(Spain) Araceli Angulo (Spain) Jesus Maria Carazo España (Spain) Julio Puertas Losa (Spain) Oskar Fernández Sola (Spain) Juan Ignacio Egaña Ballonga (Spain) Egoitz Santos Torres (Spain) Rodolfo Fco. Lizundia Acha (Spain) Gabriel Pineda Muriel

Charge	Name
Economic Area	(Spain) Koldo Obregon Arisqueta (Spain) Ritxar (Spain) Jesus Maria Carazo España
Sports Area	(Spain) Julio Puertas Losa (Spain) Egoitz Santos Torres (Spain) Oskar Fernández Sola
Youth Football School Area	(Spain) Marina Garcia Franco (Spain) Julio Puertas Losa (Spain) Araceli Angulo
Social and Institutional Area	(Spain) Txetxu Aurrekoetxea Urkixo (Spain) Oskar Fernández Sola (Spain) Marina Garcia Franco (Spain) Ritxar (Spain) Julio Puertas Losa

== Honours ==
- Winners of Amateur Championship Spain (1): 1933
- Runners-up of Amateur Championship Spain (1): 1932
- Championship Biscayne Amateur (14): 1931, 1932, 1933, 1934, 1935, 1942, 1944, 1973, 1974, 1975, 1976, 1977, 1978, 1979 (Record of titles)

=== Other Honours ===
- Ategorri Trophy Champion (14): 1981, 1983, 1986, 1989, 1998, 1999, 2001, 2003, 2004, 2006, 2010, 2012, 2015, 2016
- Ategorri Trophy Runner (16): 1971, 1975, 1978, 1980, 1988, 1990, 1991, 1992, 1993, 1995, 2000, 2002, 2005, 2007, 2008, 2011 (Ategorri Trophy registry is since 1970)
- Christmas Trophy Champion (4): 2003, 2009, 2010, 2012 (Christmas Trophy registry is since 2002)

== Seasons ==
=== Season to season ===
Season	Tier	Division	Place	Copa del Rey
1928–29	5	2ª Reg. P.	3rd	
1929–30	5	2ª Reg. P.	1st	
1930–31	5	2ª Reg. P.	1st	
1931–32	3	3ª	3rd	
1932–33	3	3ª	3rd	
1933–34	4	1ª Reg.	4th	
1934–35	4	1ª Reg.	5th	
1935–36	4	1ª Reg.	1st	First round
1939–40	2	2ª	6th	First round
1940–41	3	3ª	3rd	
1941–42	3	1ª Reg. A	6th	
1942–43	3	1ª Reg. A	3rd	
1943–44	3	3ª	4th	Second round
1944–45	3	3ª	1st	
1945–46	3	3ª	7th	
1947–48	3	3ª	8th	Third round
1948–49	3	3ª	3rd	Second round
1949–50	2	2ª	14th	First round
1950–51	3	3ª	12th	
1951–52	3	3ª	12th	

Season	Tier	Division	Place	Copa del Rey
1952–53	3	3ª	16th	
1953–54	3	3ª	10th	
1954–55	3	3ª	5th	
1955–56	3	3ª	4th	
1956–57	3	3ª	13th	
1957–58	3	3ª	7th	
1958–59	3	3ª	9th	
1959–60	3	3ª	12th	
1960–61	3	3ª	12th	
1961–62	3	3ª	8th	
1962–63	3	3ª	10th	
1963–64	3	3ª	8th	
1964–65	3	3ª	12th	
1965–66	3	3ª	11th	
1966–67	3	3ª	9th	
1967–68	3	3ª	10th	
1968–69	3	3ª	11th	
1969–70	3	3ª	14th	
1970–71	4	Reg. Pref.	7th	
1971–72	4	Reg. Pref.	2nd	

Season	Tier	Division	Place	Copa del Rey
1972–73	4	Reg. Pref.	1st	
1973–74	3	3ª	20th	Third round
1974–75	4	Reg. Pref.	4th	
1975–76	4	Reg. Pref.	3rd	
1976–77	4	Reg. Pref.	5th	
1977–78	5	Reg. Pref.	1st	
1978–79	4	3ª	7th	Second round
1979–80	4	3ª	6th	Third round
1980–81	4	3ª	1st	First round
1981–82	3	2ª B	7th	First round
1982–83	3	2ª B	18th	Third round
1983–84	3	2ª B	17th	
1984–85	3	2ª B	20th	
1985–86	4	3ª	7th	
1986–87	4	3ª	13th	First round
1987–88	4	3ª	19th	
1988–89	5	Reg. Pref.	12th	
1989–90	5	Reg. Pref.	3rd	
1990–91	5	Terr. Pref.	2nd	
1991–92	5	Terr. Pref.	1st	

Season	Tier	Division	Place	Copa del Rey
1992–93	4	3ª	15th	
1993–94	4	3ª	20th	
1994–95	5	Terr. Pref.	5th	
1995–96	5	Terr. Pref.	12th	
1996–97	5	Terr. Pref.	4th	
1997–98	5	Terr. Pref.	3rd	
1998–99	5	Terr. Pref.	6th	
1999–2000	5	Terr. Pref.	5th	
2000–01	5	Terr. Pref.	4th	
2001–02	5	Terr. Pref.	2nd	
2002–03	5	Div. Hon.	11th	
2003–04	5	Div. Hon.	4th	
2004–05	5	Div. Hon.	5th	
2005–06	5	Div. Hon.	10th	
2006–07	5	Div. Hon.	17th	
2007–08	6	Pref.	5th	
2008–09	6	Pref.	5th	
2009–10	6	Pref.	9th	
2010–11	6	Pref.	2nd	
2011–12	5	Div. Hon.	11th	

Season	Tier	Division	Place	Copa del Rey
2012–13	5	Div. Hon.	5th	
2013–14	5	Div. Hon.	2nd	
2014–15	4	3ª	18th	
2015–16	5	Div. Hon.	13th	
2016–17	5	Div. Hon.	8th	
2017–18	5	Div. Hon.	4th	
2018–19	5	Div. Hon.	10th	
2019–20	5	Div. Hon.	16th	
2020–21	5	Div. Hon.	6th	
2021–22	6	Div. Hon.	1st	
2022–23	6	Div. Hon.	3rd	
2023–24	6	Div. Hon.	8th	
2024–25	6	Div. Hon.	7th	
2025–26	6	Div. Hon.	1st	
2026–27	5	3ª Fed.		

- 2 seasons in Segunda División
- 4 seasons in Segunda División B
- 41 seasons in Tercera División
- 1 season in Tercera Federación

=== Evolution Chart ===
From 1915 to 1965:

* Note 1: Between 1928 and 1929 the categories of First, Second and Third Division were introduced. Until then there was only regional categories that organized the Royal Spanish Football Federation and Biscayne Football Federation (both founded in 1913)
* Note 2: Between 1936 and 1939 there was no league for the Spanish civil war.

From 1965 to 2015:

* Note: Second B was introduced in 1977 as an intermediate category between the Second and Third Division.

From 2015 to present:

== Season 2016/17 ==
Note: Flags indicate national team as defined under FIFA eligibility rules; some limited exceptions apply. Players may hold more than one non-FIFA nationality.

No.	Pos.	Nation	Player
—	GK	ESP	David Antxia Jiménez
—	GK	ESP	David Martin Alonso
—		ESP	Jon Ander Vizuete Guerra
—	DF	ESP	Egoitz Martin Ramos
—		ESP	Roberto Rodriguez Vera
—		ESP	Sergio Orive Garcia
—	MF	ESP	Borja Medrano Pelaez
—		ESP	Iker Gonzalez Diaz
—	MF	ESP	Ruben Boada Sánchez
—	MF	ARG	Sergio Jose Lopez Benitez
—		ESP	Iñigo Rekero Garcia
—		ESP	Mikel Tocado Alviz
—		ESP	Iñigo Lakarra Etxebarria
—		ESP	Gorka Benitez Garcia
—		ESP	Markel Garrido Torre
—		ESP	Mikel Aiartzaguena Agirrebeitia
—		ESP	Pello Paulo Uriarte Esparta
—		ESP	Victoriano Cortes Martin
—		ESP	Aitor Pedernales Erauzquin
—		ESP	Iñigo Sanchez Rodriguez
—		ESP	Iker Madariaga Bascones
—		ESP	Ruben Susmozas Rodriguez

- (inj) = Injured long-term
- (c) = Captain

== Youth Teams ==
=== Erandio "B" ===
The Erandio "B" is the subsidiary of Erandio Club team. Currently on Vizcaya First Territorial Division, Group 1 and play their games in Ategorri.

=== Youth ===
The club has two youth teams federated, each in a different category. The First Youth (Txorierri) currently plays in the Youth First Division of Group 1 and the second juvenile (Ategorri) plays in Youth Second Division Group 4.

=== Cadets and Infant ===
The club also has available cadet teams and children to promote new players. The junior team currently plays in the second division of cadets of Group 4 and infant child in the second division.

=== Neskak ===
Erandio has a women's team from 2002-2007 until the first team won promotion to Regional 1st Biscayne in 2006/07. In 2007 after splitting with Erandio Sport Society Club and born Betiko Neskak Futbol Kirol Elkartea
