= 1944–45 Tercera División =

Tercera División
- Season: 1944–45

The 1944–45 Tercera División was the ninth edition of the Spanish third national tier. The competition was divided into 3 phases.

== League tables ==
=== Group I ===
Pos	Team	Pld	W	D	L	GF	GA	GD	Pts
1	Lucense	18	10	4	4	46	19	+27	24
2	Orensana	18	10	3	5	43	25	+18	23
3	Turista	18	8	5	5	33	28	+5	21
4	Ponferradina	18	8	3	7	29	33	−4	19
5	Santiago	18	6	5	7	37	46	−9	17
6	Pontevedra	18	6	5	7	28	28	0	17
7	Galicia	18	6	4	8	30	31	−1	16
8	Lemos	18	7	2	9	38	42	−4	16
9	Berbés	18	4	6	8	29	39	−10	14
10	Betanzos	18	4	5	9	23	45	−22	13

=== Group II ===
Pos	Team	Pld	W	D	L	GF	GA	GD	Pts
1	Real Avilés	18	12	2	4	40	19	+21	26
2	Barreda	18	12	2	4	53	33	+20	26
3	Juvencia	18	9	6	3	44	24	+20	24
4	Oriamendi Hispania	18	10	2	6	43	28	+15	22
5	Gimnástica de Torrelavega	18	8	4	6	34	29	+5	20
6	La Felguera	18	6	7	5	40	34	+6	19
7	Tánagra	18	5	2	11	28	48	−20	12
8	Leonés	18	5	1	12	31	48	−17	11
9	Santoña	18	4	2	12	25	46	−21	10
10	Langreano	18	4	2	12	18	47	−29	10

=== Group III ===
Pos	Team	Pld	W	D	L	GF	GA	GD	Pts
1	Erandio	18	15	1	2	52	18	+34	31
2	Arenas de Getxo	18	14	2	2	67	20	+47	30
3	Alavés	18	13	1	4	67	31	+36	27
4	Indautxu	18	11	3	4	51	35	+16	25
5	Vasconia San Sebastián	18	7	3	8	44	45	−1	17
6	Sestao	18	6	2	10	49	52	−3	14
7	Mirandés	18	3	4	11	30	79	−49	10
8	Tolosa	18	4	1	13	37	71	−34	9
9	Real Unión	18	3	3	12	16	48	−32	9
10	Durango	18	3	2	13	30	44	−14	6 (Note: 2 points deducted)

=== Group IV ===
Pos	Team	Pld	W	D	L	GF	GA	GD	Pts
1	Arenas de Zaragoza	18	11	5	2	52	24	+28	27
2	Osasuna	18	11	3	4	49	23	+26	25
3	Maestranza Aérea	18	8	5	5	37	23	+14	21
4	Logroñés	18	7	6	5	46	31	+15	20
5	Teruel	18	8	4	6	35	27	+8	20
6	Atlético de Zaragoza	18	8	3	7	35	35	0	19
7	Huesca	18	5	5	8	26	35	−9	15
8	Escoriaza	18	3	8	7	25	34	−9	14
9	Tudelano	18	4	3	11	28	58	−30	11
10	Izarra	18	3	2	13	25	68	−43	8

=== Group V ===
Pos	Team	Pld	W	D	L	GF	GA	GD	Pts
1	Gimnàstic de Tarragona	18	15	2	1	50	12	+38	32
2	Levante	18	12	1	5	58	31	+27	25
3	Girona	18	9	2	7	31	31	0	20
4	Martinenc	18	8	3	7	39	45	−6	19
5	Júpiter	18	8	3	7	38	40	−2	19
6	Reus	18	7	4	7	36	30	+6	18
7	Atlético Baleares	18	7	2	9	33	38	−5	16
8	Granollers	18	7	1	10	43	45	−2	15
9	Lleida	18	5	2	11	28	37	−9	12
10	Terrassa	18	1	2	15	19	66	−47	4

=== Group VI ===
Pos	Team	Pld	W	D	L	GF	GA	GD	Pts
1	Salamanca	18	13	1	4	62	25	+37	27
2	Burgalesa	18	13	1	4	62	27	+35	27
3	Fábrica Nacional	18	10	5	3	44	19	+25	25
4	Valladolid	18	11	3	4	44	23	+21	25
5	Atlético de Zamora	18	8	2	8	29	35	−6	18
6	Gimnástica Segoviana	18	7	2	9	38	42	−4	16
7	Ferroviaria	18	5	4	9	31	44	−13	14
8	Béjar	18	6	0	12	38	51	−13	12
9	Imperio de Madrid	18	4	3	11	33	63	−30	11
10	Real Ávila	18	2	1	15	17	69	−52	5

=== Group VII ===
Pos	Team	Pld	W	D	L	GF	GA	GD	Pts
1	Badajoz	18	11	4	3	46	22	+24	26
2	Cifesa	18	10	3	5	39	24	+15	23
3	Manchego	18	7	6	5	38	30	+8	20
4	Mediodía	18	8	3	7	36	24	+12	19
5	Toledo	18	9	1	8	35	39	−4	19
6	Plasencia	18	8	3	7	41	31	+10	19
7	Cacereño	18	9	1	8	47	30	+17	19
8	Emeritense	18	5	5	8	30	50	−20	15
9	Talavera	18	4	2	12	28	61	−33	10
10	Trujillo	18	3	4	11	13	42	−29	8 (Note: 2 points deducted. Team was disqualified and relegated)

=== Group VIII ===
Pos	Team	Pld	W	D	L	GF	GA	GD	Pts
1	Elche	18	11	4	3	64	30	+34	26
2	Almansa	18	11	4	3	31	16	+15	26
3	Albacete	18	10	2	6	35	19	+16	22
4	Imperial	18	10	1	7	51	28	+23	21
5	Cieza	18	8	5	5	39	45	−6	21
6	Eldense	18	9	2	7	57	40	+17	20
7	Cartagena	18	6	4	8	29	33	−4	16
8	Alicante	18	5	1	12	24	48	−24	11
9	Crevillente	18	4	3	11	28	56	−28	11
10	Gimnástica Abad	18	2	2	14	19	62	−43	6

=== Group IX ===
Pos	Team	Pld	W	D	L	GF	GA	GD	Pts
1	Córdoba	18	11	3	4	41	20	+21	25
2	Málaga	18	10	3	5	50	22	+28	23
3	Coria	18	8	4	6	36	30	+6	20
4	Jiennense	18	8	3	7	32	35	−3	19
5	Melilla	18	6	6	6	26	31	−5	18
6	Onuba	18	5	7	6	29	29	0	17
7	Balompédica Linense	18	7	3	8	23	32	−9	17
8	Algeciras	18	5	6	7	28	34	−6	16
9	Linares	18	3	7	8	23	31	−8	13
10	Atlético Tetuán	18	3	6	9	20	44	−24	12

== Promotion playoff ==
=== First round ===
==== Group I ====
Pos	Team	Pld	W	D	L	GF	GA	GD	Pts
1	Salamanca	10	7	0	3	23	8	+15	14
2	Burgalesa	10	7	0	3	24	15	+9	14
3	Orensana	10	4	2	4	13	15	−2	10
4	Barreda	10	5	0	5	12	22	−10	10
5	Real Avilés	10	3	2	5	11	17	−6	8
6	Lucense	10	2	0	8	14	20	−6	4

==== Group II ====
Pos	Team	Pld	W	D	L	GF	GA	GD	Pts
1	Gimnàstic de Tarragona	10	6	3	1	22	4	+18	15
2	Arenas de Getxo	10	4	3	3	23	22	+1	11
3	Cifesa	10	4	1	5	23	24	−1	9
4	Osasuna	10	4	1	5	15	22	−7	9
5	Arenas de Zaragoza	10	3	3	4	15	23	−8	9
6	Erandio	10	2	3	5	12	15	−3	7

==== Group III ====
Pos	Team	Pld	W	D	L	GF	GA	GD	Pts
1	Córdoba	10	6	3	1	24	11	+13	15
2	Levante	10	6	1	3	26	12	+14	13
3	Málaga	10	5	3	2	19	16	+3	13
4	Badajoz	10	3	2	5	24	28	−4	8
5	Elche	10	1	5	4	22	28	−6	7
6	Almansa	10	1	2	7	11	31	−20	4

=== Second round ===
Pos	Team	Pld	W	D	L	GF	GA	GD	Pts
1	Gimnàstic de Tarragona	4	3	0	1	13	4	+9	6
2	Salamanca	4	2	0	2	5	11	−6	4
3	Córdoba	4	1	0	3	6	9	−3	2

=== Final Round ===
Team 1	Score	Team 2
Constància	2–3	Córdoba

== Relegation playoff ==
=== Group V ===
Pos	Team	Pld	W	D	L	GF	GA	GD	Pts
1	Badalona	18	13	2	3	45	18	+27	28
2	Júpiter	18	10	5	3	41	19	+22	25
3	Sants	18	8	4	6	36	30	+6	20
4	Girona	18	8	1	9	38	39	−1	17
5	Tortosa	18	7	3	8	23	43	−20	17
6	Reus	18	7	2	9	29	48	−19	16
7	Terrassa	18	7	1	10	33	38	−5	15
8	Granollers	18	6	3	9	49	44	+5	15
9	Lleida	18	5	4	9	37	44	−7	14
10	Martinenc	18	5	3	10	37	47	−10	13

=== First round ===
Team 1	Agg.	Team 2	1st leg	2nd leg
Manacor	1–4	Sueca	1–1	0–3
Larache	3–2	Calavera	3–0	0–2

=== Final Round ===
Team 1	Agg.	Team 2	1st leg	2nd leg
Rápido de Bouzas	3–4	Betanzos	3–2	0–2
Langreano	6–2	Deportivo Universo	2–0	4–2
Getxo	9–3	Durango	6–2	3–1
Borja	5–3	Izarra	5–1	0–2
Sants	6–4	Sueca	4–1	2–3
Alcalá	2–6	Real Ávila	1–1	1–5
Gimnástica Abad	5–3	Yeclano	4–0	1–3
Larache	4–0	Atlético Tetuán	3–0	1–0
