= 1933–34 Tercera División =

Tercera División
- Season: 1933–34
- Promoted: Real Valladolid
- Matches played: 113
- Goals scored: 463 (4.1 per match)
- Biggest home win: Unión Sporting 11–1 Galicia Sporting (24 December 1933); Unión Sporting 10–0 Ciosvín (31 December 1933)
- Biggest away win: Ciosvín 2–9 Unión Sporting (10 December 1933)
- Highest scoring: Unión Sporting 11–1 Galicia Sporting (24 December 1933)

== League tables ==
=== Group A ===
==== Norte Oeste ====
| Pos | Team | Pld | W | D | L | GF | GA | GD | Pts |
|---|---|---|---|---|---|---|---|---|---|
| 1 | Real Valladolid | 10 | 6 | 2 | 2 | 24 | 13 | +11 | 14 |
| 2 | Barakaldo | 10 | 6 | 1 | 3 | 22 | 13 | +9 | 13 |
| 3 | Logroño | 9 | 4 | 2 | 3 | 19 | 18 | +1 | 10 |
| 4 | Stadium Avilesino | 10 | 4 | 0 | 6 | 24 | 25 | −1 | 8 |
| 5 | Racing de Ferrol | 9 | 3 | 1 | 5 | 18 | 24 | −6 | 7 |
| 6 | Nacional de Madrid | 10 | 2 | 2 | 6 | 16 | 30 | −14 | 6 |

==== Centro Levante ====
| Pos | Team | Pld | W | D | L | GF | GA | GD | Pts |
|---|---|---|---|---|---|---|---|---|---|
| 1 | Real Zaragoza | 10 | 5 | 3 | 2 | 19 | 6 | +13 | 13 |
| 2 | Elche | 10 | 6 | 0 | 4 | 15 | 13 | +2 | 12 |
| 3 | Gimnástico | 10 | 5 | 2 | 3 | 13 | 11 | +2 | 12 |
| 4 | Hércules | 10 | 5 | 0 | 5 | 16 | 9 | +7 | 10 |
| 5 | Levante | 10 | 4 | 2 | 4 | 12 | 11 | +1 | 10 |
| 6 | Cartagena | 10 | 1 | 1 | 8 | 7 | 32 | −25 | 3 |

=== Group B ===
==== I ====
| Pos | Team | Pld | W | D | L | GF | GA | GD | Pts |
|---|---|---|---|---|---|---|---|---|---|
| 1 | Unión Sporting | 4 | 3 | 0 | 1 | 31 | 6 | +25 | 6 |
| 2 | Galicia Sporting | 4 | 2 | 1 | 1 | 7 | 13 | −6 | 5 |
| 3 | Ciosvín | 4 | 0 | 1 | 3 | 3 | 22 | −19 | 1 |

==== II ====
| Pos | Team | Pld | W | D | L | GF | GA | GD | Pts |
|---|---|---|---|---|---|---|---|---|---|
| 1 | Gimnástica de Torrelavega | 6 | 4 | 2 | 0 | 19 | 6 | +13 | 10 |
| 2 | Gijón | 6 | 2 | 2 | 2 | 15 | 13 | +2 | 6 |
| 3 | Ovetense | 6 | 2 | 2 | 2 | 15 | 16 | −1 | 6 |
| 4 | Santoña | 6 | 0 | 2 | 4 | 7 | 21 | −14 | 2 |

==== III ====
| Pos | Team | Pld | W | D | L | GF | GA | GD | Pts |
|---|---|---|---|---|---|---|---|---|---|
| 1 | Ferroviaria | 6 | 5 | 0 | 1 | 20 | 2 | +18 | 10 |
| 2 | Huesca | 6 | 3 | 1 | 2 | 4 | 2 | +2 | 7 |
| 3 | Arenas de Zaragoza | 6 | 2 | 1 | 3 | 4 | 12 | −8 | 5 |
| 4 | Tranviaria | 6 | 1 | 0 | 5 | 0 | 12 | −12 | 2 |

==== IV ====
| Pos | Team | Pld | W | D | L | GF | GA | GD | Pts |
|---|---|---|---|---|---|---|---|---|---|
| 1 | Girona | 6 | 3 | 3 | 0 | 20 | 6 | +14 | 9 |
| 2 | Júpiter | 6 | 3 | 2 | 1 | 13 | 4 | +9 | 8 |
| 3 | Granollers | 6 | 2 | 0 | 4 | 10 | 18 | −8 | 4 |
| 4 | Badalona | 6 | 1 | 1 | 4 | 9 | 24 | −15 | 3 |

==== V ====
| Pos | Team | Pld | W | D | L | GF | GA | GD | Pts |
|---|---|---|---|---|---|---|---|---|---|
| 1 | Alicante | 6 | 4 | 0 | 2 | 20 | 10 | +10 | 8 |
| 2 | Athletic Almería | 6 | 3 | 1 | 2 | 13 | 16 | −3 | 7 |
| 3 | Imperial | 6 | 3 | 0 | 3 | 13 | 15 | −2 | 6 |
| 4 | Gimnástica Abad | 6 | 1 | 1 | 4 | 13 | 18 | −5 | 3 |

==== VI ====
| Pos | Team | Pld | W | D | L | GF | GA | GD | Pts |
|---|---|---|---|---|---|---|---|---|---|
| 1 | Recreativo de Granada | 4 | 3 | 0 | 1 | 9 | 6 | +3 | 6 |
| 2 | Xerez | 4 | 2 | 0 | 2 | 7 | 8 | −1 | 4 |
| 3 | Malacitano | 4 | 1 | 0 | 3 | 6 | 8 | −2 | 2 |

== Promotion playoff ==
=== First round ===
| Team 1 | Agg. | Team 2 | 1st leg | 2nd leg |
|---|---|---|---|---|
| Unión Sporting | 5–1 | Gimnástica de Torrelavega | 3–0 | 2–1 |
| Júpiter | 5–4 | Ferroviaria | 3–3 | 2–1 |
| Alicante | 2–3 | Girona | 1–1 | 1–2 |

=== Second round ===
| Team 1 | Agg. | Team 2 | 1st leg | 2nd leg |
|---|---|---|---|---|
| Unión Sporting | (w/o) | Júpiter | – | – |
| Girona | 2–4 | Recreativo de Granada | 2–2 | 0–2 |

=== Third round ===
| Team 1 | Agg. | Team 2 | 1st leg | 2nd leg |
|---|---|---|---|---|
| Unión Sporting | 3–5 | Logroño | 1–2 | 2–3 |
| Gimnástico | 4–4 | Recreativo de Granada | 3–0 | 1–4 |

==== Tiebreakers ====
| Team 1 | Score | Team 2 |
|---|---|---|
| Gimnástico | 1–1 | Recreativo de Granada |
| Gimnástico | 3–0 | Recreativo de Granada |

=== Final Round ===
| Pos | Team | Pld | W | D | L | GF | GA | GD | Pts |
|---|---|---|---|---|---|---|---|---|---|
| 1 | Real Valladolid | 8 | 5 | 2 | 1 | 24 | 14 | +10 | 12 |
| 2 | Real Zaragoza | 8 | 4 | 1 | 3 | 21 | 15 | +6 | 9 |
| 3 | Elche | 8 | 3 | 2 | 3 | 14 | 18 | −4 | 8 |
| 4 | Gimnástico | 8 | 4 | 0 | 4 | 10 | 17 | −7 | 8 |
| 5 | Logroño | 8 | 1 | 1 | 6 | 10 | 15 | −5 | 3 |
| 6 | Barakaldo (Note: Team withdrawn from the competition) | 0 | 0 | 0 | 0 | 0 | 0 | 0 | 0 |
