= Racing de Sama =

Spanish football club

- Full name: Racing de Sama
- Founded: 1915 (2006, team refounded)
- Dissolved: 1961 (2009, team refounded)
- Ground: Sama, Langreo, Asturias, Spain
- Capacity: 1,500
Home colours

Racing de Sama, also known as Club Langreano, was a Spanish football club based in the parish of Sama, Langreo, Asturias. Founded in 1915, it held home matches at Torre de los Reyes, with a 1,500 capacity.

== History ==
Racing de Sama was founded in 1915. In 1939, due to a temporary law forbidding the use of foreign words in football club names, changed its name to Club Langreano de Sama. This denomination was used until 1961, when the club merged with CP La Felguera for creating UP Langreo.

The club was refounded in 2006, but it only played three seasons before a new dissolution in 2009.

== Seasons ==
Season	Tier	Division	Place	Copa del Rey
1927–28	1	1ª Reg.	2nd	Group stage
1928–29	4	1ª Reg.	3rd	
1928–1934	—	Regional	—	
1934–35	4	1ª Reg.		Second round
1935–36	4	1ª Reg.		
1939–40	4	1ª Reg.	3rd	1st round
1940–41	3	3ª	1st	2nd round
1941–42	3	1ª Reg.	2nd	
1942–43	3	1ª Reg.	4th	
1943–44	3	3ª	8th	Third round
1944–45	3	3ª	10th	
1945–46	3	3ª	9th	
1946–47	3	3ª	10th	
1947–48	3	3ª	12th	First round

Season	Tier	Division	Place	Copa del Rey
1948–49	4	1ª Reg.	8th	
1949–50	3	3ª	10th	
1950–51	3	3ª	8th	
1951–52	3	3ª	12th	
1952–53	3	3ª	10th	
1953–54	3	3ª	11th	
1954–55	3	3ª	1st	
1955–56	3	3ª	1st	
1956–57	3	3ª	2nd	
1957–58	3	3ª	2nd	
1958–59	3	3ª	3rd	
1959–60	3	3ª	5th	
1960–61	3	3ª	3rd	

- 18 seasons in Tercera División

Team refounded

Season	Tier	Division	Place	Copa del Rey
2006–07	7	2ª Reg.	1st	
2007–08	6	1ª Reg.	1st	
2008–09	5	Reg. Pref.	6th	
