= SCD Durango =

Association football club in Spain

Coordinates: 43.157605°N 2.634855°W

Cultural Durango
- Full name: Sociedad Cultural Deportiva Durango
- Founded: 1919
- Ground: Tabira, Durango, Basque Country, Spain
- Capacity: 3,000
- President: (Spain) José Luis Espiau
- Head coach: (Spain) Jon Larreategi
- League: Tercera Federación – Group 4
- 2025–26: Tercera Federación – Group 4, 11th of 18
- Website: culturaldurango.org
Home colours	Away colours

Sociedad Cultural Deportiva Durango is a Spanish football team based in Durango, Biscay, in the autonomous community of Basque Country. Founded in 1919 it plays in Tercera Federación – Group 4, holding home matches at Estadio Tabira, with a capacity of 3,000 spectators.

== History ==
In the 2017–18 season the club won the Group 4 of the Tercera División and promoted to Segunda División B.

== Season to season ==
Season	Tier	Division	Place	Copa del Rey
1928–29	5	2ª Reg. P.	3rd	
1929–30	5	2ª Reg. P.	6th	
1930–31	5	2ª Reg. P.	8th	
1931–32	5	2ª Reg. P.	4th	
1932–33	5	2ª Reg. P.	6th	
1933–34	5	2ª Reg. P.	4th	
1934–35	4	1ª Reg. P.	9th	
1935–36	5	2ª Reg. P.	2nd	
1939–40	6	2ª Reg.	1st	
1940–41	5	1ª Reg. B	6th	
1941–42	4	1ª Reg. B	2nd	
1942–43	4	1ª Reg. B	3rd	
1943–44	4	1ª Reg.	2nd	Second round
1944–45	3	3ª	10th	
1945–46	4	1ª Reg.	1st	
1946–47	3	3ª	7th	
1947–48	3	3ª	11th	Fourth round
1948–49	4	1ª Reg.	6th	
1949–50	4	1ª Reg.	3rd	
1950–51	4	1ª Reg.	2nd	

Season	Tier	Division	Place	Copa del Rey
1951–52	4	1ª Reg.	8th	
1952–53	4	1ª Reg.	3rd	
1953–54	4	1ª Reg.	5th	
1954–55	4	1ª Reg.	2nd	
1955–56	3	3ª	2nd	
1956–57	3	3ª	6th	
1957–58	3	3ª	9th	
1958–59	3	3ª	8th	
1959–60	3	3ª	5th	
1960–61	3	3ª	6th	
1961–62	3	3ª	15th	
1962–63	4	1ª Reg.	2nd	
1963–64	4	1ª Reg.	7th	
1964–65	4	1ª Reg.	6th	
1965–66	4	1ª Reg.	14th	
1966–67	4	1ª Reg.	10th	
1967–68	4	1ª Reg.	1st	
1968–69	4	Reg. Pref.	8th	
1969–70	4	Reg. Pref.	6th	
1970–71	4	Reg. Pref.	16th	

Season	Tier	Division	Place	Copa del Rey
1971–72	4	Reg. Pref.	14th	
1972–73	4	Reg. Pref.	11th	
1973–74	4	Reg. Pref.	6th	
1974–75	4	Reg. Pref.	2nd	
1975–76	4	Reg. Pref.	8th	
1976–77	4	Reg. Pref.	4th	
1977–78	5	Reg. Pref.	7th	
1978–79	5	Reg. Pref.	10th	
1979–80	5	Reg. Pref.	5th	
1980–81	5	Reg. Pref.	3rd	
1981–82	5	Reg. Pref.	1st	
1982–83	4	3ª	1st	
1983–84	4	3ª	3rd	First round
1984–85	4	3ª	5th	First round
1985–86	4	3ª	6th	First round
1986–87	4	3ª	1st	First round
1987–88	3	2ª B	8th	First round
1988–89	3	2ª B	16th	First round
1989–90	3	2ª B	6th	
1990–91	3	2ª B	18th	Fourth round

Season	Tier	Division	Place	Copa del Rey
1991–92	4	3ª	10th	Second round
1992–93	4	3ª	13th	
1993–94	4	3ª	4th	
1994–95	4	3ª	2nd	
1995–96	3	2ª B	18th	Second round
1996–97	4	3ª	5th	
1997–98	4	3ª	6th	
1998–99	4	3ª	6th	
1999–2000	4	3ª	10th	
2000–01	4	3ª	8th	
2001–02	4	3ª	14th	
2002–03	4	3ª	17th	
2003–04	5	Div. Hon.	1st	
2004–05	4	3ª	4th	
2005–06	3	2ª B	17th	
2006–07	4	3ª	8th	
2007–08	4	3ª	17th	
2008–09	4	3ª	16th	
2009–10	4	3ª	7th	
2010–11	4	3ª	4th	

Season	Tier	Division	Place	Copa del Rey
2011–12	4	3ª	7th	
2012–13	4	3ª	8th	
2013–14	4	3ª	12th	
2014–15	4	3ª	4th	
2015–16	4	3ª	10th	
2016–17	4	3ª	3rd	
2017–18	4	3ª	1st	Second round
2018–19	3	2ª B	20th	First round
2019–20	4	3ª	15th	
2020–21	4	3ª	8th / 1st	
2021–22	5	3ª RFEF	8th	
2022–23	5	3ª Fed.	8th	
2023–24	5	3ª Fed.	7th	
2024–25	5	3ª Fed.	13th	
2025–26	5	3ª Fed.	11th	
2026–27	5	3ª Fed.		

- 7 seasons in Segunda División B
- 41 seasons in Tercera División
- 6 seasons in Tercera Federación/Tercera División RFEF

== Current squad ==
As of 23 October 2018

Note: Flags indicate national team as defined under FIFA eligibility rules; some limited exceptions apply. Players may hold more than one non-FIFA nationality.

No.	Pos.	Nation	Player
—	GK	ESP	Andoni Errasti
—	GK	ESP	Pelo Mendizabal
—	DF	ESP	Jurgi Txopitea
—	DF	ESP	Ibon Arizmendiarrieta
—	DF	ESP	Jaboba Portillo
—	DF	ESP	Xabier Infante
—	DF	ESP	Jon Galarza
—	DF	ESP	Jon Aranda
—	DF	ESP	Ion Varela
—	MF	ESP	Ander Zuazo
—	MF	ESP	Juanma Iparra

No.	Pos.	Nation	Player
—	MF	ESP	Javier Alonso
—	MF	ESP	Ekaitz Molina
—	MF	ESP	Ander Hermoso
—	MF	ESP	Beñat Alberdi
—	MF	ESP	Julen Uribesalgo
—	FW	ESP	Unai Arizmendiarrieta
—	FW	ESP	Adrián Abasolo
—	FW	ESP	Mikel Pradera
—	FW	ESP	Ekain Cenitagoya
—	FW	ESP	Juan Gogeaskoetxea

== Honours ==
- Tercera División: 1982–83, 1986–87, 2017–18
