= 1945–46 Tercera División =

Soccer division in Spain 1945–1946

Tercera División
- Season: 1945–46

The 1945–46 Tercera División was the tenth edition of the Spanish third national tier. The competition was divided into 3 phases.

== Format ==
The division comprised 100 clubs in 10 geographic groups. The top 3 clubs in each group (30 in total) progressed to the Second Phase. The Second Phase comprised 5 groups of 6 clubs, each club playing 10 matches. The 5 group winners progressed to the Final Phase - a group of 5 clubs, each playing 8 matches. The top two teams were promoted to the Segunda División and the third-placed team played off against the 12th placed team in the Segunda División.

== Regular season ==
=== Group 1 ===
Pos	Team	Pld	W	D	L	GF	GA	GD	Pts	Qualification
1	Orensana	18	13	2	3	54	22	+32	28	Second Phase
2	Ponferradina	18	11	3	4	41	24	+17	25	Second Phase
3	Pontevedra	18	10	3	5	48	27	+21	23	Second Phase
4	Berbés	18	9	3	6	48	33	+15	21	
5	Lucense	18	8	2	8	38	41	−3	18	
6	Turista	18	6	4	8	31	38	−7	16	
7	Santiago	18	3	8	7	28	40	−12	14	
8	Betanzos	18	6	2	10	26	33	−7	14	
9	Lemos	18	5	3	10	21	49	−28	13	
10	Galicia Ferrol	18	3	2	13	26	54	−28	8	Relegation Phase

=== Group 2 ===
Pos	Team	Pld	W	D	L	GF	GA	GD	Pts	Qualification
1	La Felguera	18	11	2	5	38	21	+17	24	Second Phase
2	Gimnastica Torrelavega	18	10	3	5	46	29	+17	23	Second Phase
3	Tanagra	18	8	5	5	49	27	+22	21	Second Phase
4	Barreda	18	7	7	4	29	25	+4	21	
5	Avilés	18	9	2	7	37	32	+5	20	
6	Gijonés	18	8	2	8	37	39	−2	18	
7	Maestranza Leon	18	5	5	8	29	49	−20	15	
8	Santoña	18	4	6	8	34	41	−7	14	
9	Langreano	18	4	5	9	22	46	−24	13	
10	Juvencia	18	4	3	11	36	48	−12	11	Relegation Phase

=== Group 3 ===
Pos	Team	Pld	W	D	L	GF	GA	GD	Pts	Qualification
1	Arenas Guecho	18	13	3	2	53	21	+32	29	Second Phase
2	Sestao	18	13	3	2	46	20	+26	29	Second Phase
3	Baracaldo	18	11	2	5	41	26	+15	24	Second Phase
4	Indauchu	18	8	3	7	40	37	+3	19	
5	Alavés	18	7	3	8	33	38	−5	17	
6	Mirandés	18	6	3	9	29	45	−16	15	
7	Erandio	18	5	4	9	21	22	−1	14	
8	Guecho	18	6	2	10	28	43	−15	14	
9	Tolosa	18	6	1	11	31	34	−3	13	
10	Real Unión	18	2	2	14	12	48	−36	6	Relegation Phase

=== Group 4 ===
Pos	Team	Pld	W	D	L	GF	GA	GD	Pts	Qualification
1	Arenas Zaragoza	18	12	5	1	49	15	+34	29	Second Phase
2	Logroñés	18	12	4	2	44	12	+32	28	Second Phase
3	Maestranza Logroño	18	11	2	5	65	33	+32	24	Second Phase
4	Escoriaza	18	10	1	7	44	41	+3	21	
5	Osasuna	18	7	5	6	33	33	0	19	
6	Huesca	18	7	4	7	39	38	+1	18	
7	CA Zaragoza	18	7	2	9	40	33	+7	16	
8	Tudelano	18	4	4	10	29	51	−22	12	
9	Izarra	18	3	2	13	31	61	−30	8	
10	Borja	18	1	3	14	21	78	−57	5	Relegation Phase

=== Group 5 ===
Pos	Team	Pld	W	D	L	GF	GA	GD	Pts	Qualification
1	Badalona	18	12	3	3	46	21	+25	27	Second Phase
2	Júpiter	18	11	4	3	47	17	+30	26	Second Phase
3	Reus	18	8	4	6	42	31	+11	20	Second Phase
4	Tortosa	18	8	4	6	33	29	+4	20	
5	Sans	18	7	3	8	27	29	−2	17	
6	Gerona	18	6	4	8	23	40	−17	16	
7	Granollers	18	6	4	8	35	38	−3	16	
8	San Martín	18	6	3	9	28	33	−5	15	
9	Tarrasa	18	6	3	9	23	36	−13	15	
10	Lérida	18	3	2	13	29	59	−30	8	Relegation Phase

=== Group 6 ===
Pos	Team	Pld	W	D	L	GF	GA	GD	Pts	Qualification
1	Levante	18	16	1	1	88	18	+70	33	Second Phase
2	Constancia	18	13	1	4	44	17	+27	27	Second Phase
3	Atletico Baleares	18	11	2	5	37	19	+18	24	Second Phase
4	Olímpico Játiva	18	10	1	7	36	23	+13	21	
5	Saguntino	18	7	4	7	25	39	−14	18	
6	Acero	18	7	3	8	33	39	−6	17	
7	Carcagente	18	5	4	9	21	34	−13	14	
8	Sueca	18	5	4	9	30	42	−12	14	
9	Malvarrosa	18	4	1	13	20	44	−24	9	
10	Teruel	18	1	1	16	15	74	−59	1 (Note: 2 points deducted. Teruel failed to appear at Atletico Baleares who were awarded the win.)	Relegation Phase

=== Group 7 ===
Pos	Team	Pld	W	D	L	GF	GA	GD	Pts	Qualification
1	Albacete	18	12	2	4	50	17	+33	26	Second Phase
2	Elche	18	11	2	5	39	27	+12	24	Second Phase
3	Almansa	18	10	3	5	58	23	+35	23	Second Phase
4	Cartagena	18	10	2	6	37	23	+14	22	
5	Imperial	18	10	1	7	42	28	+14	21	
6	Gimnastica Abad	18	7	1	10	29	51	−22	15	
7	Eldense	18	6	3	9	28	40	−12	15	
8	Cieza	18	6	1	11	27	57	−30	13	
9	Alicante	18	5	2	11	26	38	−12	12	
10	Crevillente	18	3	3	12	21	53	−32	9	Relegation Phase

=== Group 8 ===
Pos	Team	Pld	W	D	L	GF	GA	GD	Pts	Qualification
1	Valladolid	18	11	5	2	41	22	+19	27	Second Phase
2	Imperio Madrid	18	11	2	5	55	33	+22	24	Second Phase
3	Cultural Leonesa	18	9	4	5	40	25	+15	22	Second Phase
4	FN Palencia	18	7	5	6	37	30	+7	19	
5	Ferroviaria	18	6	5	7	35	35	0	17	
6	Ávila	18	7	2	9	32	41	−9	16	
7	Gimnastica Burgalesa	18	7	1	10	44	37	+7	15	
8	Atletico Zamora	18	6	2	10	31	48	−17	14	
9	Bejarana	18	5	4	9	28	51	−23	14	
10	Gimnastica Segoviana	18	3	6	9	31	52	−21	12	Relegation Phase

=== Group 9 ===
Pos	Team	Pld	W	D	L	GF	GA	GD	Pts	Qualification
1	Badajoz	18	12	3	3	46	24	+22	27	Second Phase
2	Cacereño	18	12	2	4	54	20	+34	26	Second Phase
3	Toledo	18	10	4	4	52	37	+15	24	Second Phase
4	Manchego	18	5	8	5	32	38	−6	18	
5	Tomelloso	18	7	4	7	42	47	−5	18	
6	Mediodía	18	7	3	8	46	40	+6	16 (Note: 1 point deducted for fielding an ineligible player in a 5-1 home win against Toledo. Toledo were awarded the win.)	
7	Cifesa	18	7	1	10	46	52	−6	15	
8	Talavera	18	4	5	9	33	43	−10	13	
9	Plasencia	18	5	3	10	32	52	−20	13	
10	Emeritense	18	3	3	12	28	58	−30	9	Relegation Phase

=== Group 10 ===
Pos	Team	Pld	W	D	L	GF	GA	GD	Pts	Qualification
1	Málaga	18	12	3	3	54	18	+36	27	Second Phase
2	Olimpica Jienense	18	12	1	5	40	26	+14	25	Second Phase
3	Melilla	18	11	1	6	43	37	+6	23	Second Phase
4	Larache	18	7	3	8	36	36	0	17	
5	Linense	18	6	4	8	33	40	−7	16	
6	Recreativo Huelva	18	6	3	9	38	42	−4	15	
7	Coria	18	6	3	9	33	37	−4	15	
8	Cádiz	18	7	1	10	28	47	−19	15	
9	Linares Deportivo	18	7	0	11	28	37	−9	14	
10	Algeciras	18	6	1	11	28	41	−13	13	Relegation Phase

=== Group 10 repechage ===
Team 1	Agg.	Team 2	1st leg	2nd leg
At. Tetuán	4 – 4	Cádiz	3-0	1-4

- Replay:

Team 1	Score	Team 2
At. Tetuán	2 – 3 (aet)	Cádiz

- Calavera was withdraw of this group before the start the competition.

Between Cadiz and Tetuán was played a match to play on this group, Cádiz promoted.

== Second phase ==
=== Group 1 ===
Pos	Team	Pld	W	D	L	GF	GA	GD	Pts	Qualification
1	Valladolid	10	8	1	1	23	7	+16	17	Final Phase
2	Pontevedra	10	5	0	5	21	15	+6	10	
3	Imperio Madrid	10	5	0	5	17	16	+1	10	
4	Orensana	10	3	3	4	14	18	−4	9	
5	Cultural Leonesa	10	4	1	5	21	23	−2	9	
6	Ponferradina	10	2	1	7	15	32	−17	5	

=== Group 2 ===
Pos	Team	Pld	W	D	L	GF	GA	GD	Pts	Qualification
1	Baracaldo	10	9	1	0	22	4	+18	19	Final Phase
2	La Felguera	10	5	1	4	21	13	+8	11	
3	Sestao	10	4	3	3	15	13	+2	11	
4	Arenas G.	10	3	2	5	11	16	−5	8	
5	Gim. Torrelavega	10	4	0	6	11	12	−1	8	
6	Tanagra	10	1	1	8	8	30	−22	3	

=== Group 3 ===
Pos	Team	Pld	W	D	L	GF	GA	GD	Pts	Qualification
1	Arenas Zaragoza	10	6	2	2	26	18	+8	14	Final Phase
2	Logroñés	10	6	1	3	30	18	+12	13	
3	Reus	10	4	2	4	20	19	+1	10	
4	Badalona	10	4	1	5	30	24	+6	9	
5	Júpiter	10	3	2	5	12	29	−17	8	
6	Maestranza A.	10	3	0	7	17	27	−10	6	

=== Group 4 ===
Pos	Team	Pld	W	D	L	GF	GA	GD	Pts	Qualification
1	Levante	10	7	1	2	30	10	+20	15	Final Phase
2	At. Baleares	10	7	1	2	19	10	+9	15	
3	Albacete	10	6	0	4	23	16	+7	12	
4	Elche	10	3	1	6	15	24	−9	7	
5	Constancia	10	3	1	6	12	17	−5	7	
6	Almansa	10	1	2	7	13	35	−22	4	

=== Group 5 ===
Pos	Team	Pld	W	D	L	GF	GA	GD	Pts	Qualification
1	Málaga	10	8	1	1	29	9	+20	17	Final Phase
2	Ol. Jienense	10	5	0	5	23	17	+6	10	
3	Cacereño	10	4	1	5	16	21	−5	9	
4	Toledo	10	4	0	6	19	27	−8	8	
5	Melilla	10	4	0	6	18	20	−2	8	
6	Badajoz	10	4	0	6	16	27	−11	8	

== Final phase ==
=== Group ===
Pos	Team	Pld	W	D	L	GF	GA	GD	Pts	Promotion or qualification
1	Málaga	8	5	2	1	21	11	+10	12	Promotion to the Segunda División
2	Levante	8	5	0	3	24	11	+13	10	Promotion to the Segunda División
3	Baracaldo	8	2	2	4	10	14	−4	6	Promotion/relegation playoff
4	Valladolid	8	3	0	5	13	19	−6	6	
5	Arenas Zarag.	8	2	2	4	10	23	−13	6	

=== Promotion/relegation playoff ===
Team 1	Score	Team 2
Jerez	0 – 2 (aet)	Baracaldo

Note: Baracaldo were promoted to the Segunda División.
