= Terrassa FC =

Association football club in Spain

Terrassa
- Full name: Terrassa Futbol Club
- Nicknames: Egarencs, vermells
- Founded: 1906; 120 years ago
- Ground: Estadi Olímpic, Terrassa, Catalonia, Spain
- Capacity: 7,500
- President: Constantinos Tsakiris
- Head coach: Oriol Alsina
- League: Segunda Federación – Group 2
- 2025–26: Segunda Federación – Group 3, 8th of 18
Home colours	Away colours

Terrassa Futbol Club is a Spanish football team based in Terrassa, Barcelona, in the autonomous community of Catalonia. Founded in 1906, it currently plays in Segunda Federación – Group 2, holding home matches at Estadi Olímpic de Terrassa, with a capacity of 7,500 spectators.

== History ==
Terrassa's foundations were set in 1914, with the first regulations being created by the board of directors, presided by Narcís Freixa Ubach. Three years later the club played one of its first international matches, against FC Basel of Switzerland, also winning three trophies: Copa Ramón Torras, Copa del Día Gráfico and Copa Sport, playing (and winning) twice against FC Barcelona, 1–0 and 2–1.

Terrassa won its first Copa Catalunya in 1925, and first reached Segunda División seventeen years later, although it would be immediately relegated for the following 11 seasons.

In the 1960–61 campaign, with the team again in the second level – being again relegated – a Copa del Rey tie against Barça was played at the Camp Nou, with the hosts winning it 4–2 in front of over 80,000 spectators. The new ground, Estadi Olímpic de Terrassa, was also inaugurated with a 2–4 loss with Sevilla FC, as the club's new exile in Tercera División would be even longer the second time (14 years, although Segunda División B had not yet been created as the new division three).

On 29 May 1972, new club president Josep Masdefiol i Peralta was elected: other than aiding the club financially, he eventually created the Trofeo Internacional de Fútbol Ciudad de Terrassa, with Real Zaragoza, Ferencvárosi TC and FC Bayern Munich being the first participants. Still, the club's anthem was created, by Vicenç Villatoro.

Terrassa played the 1977 relegation play-offs against AD Almería, winning after its opponent had fielded an ineligible player. In the 1980s, the club eventually dropped two levels, and had reached the regional leagues by 1990; as in several times in the past, the city hall intervened and enabled the club to stay afloat.

In 2001–02's third division, Terrassa finished in fifth position, but was allowed to participate in the promotion playoffs after Zaragoza's first team relegated from the top flight, rendering its reserves' possible promotion impossible. The promotion was attained after six matches and as many wins.

The club would play the next three years in division two, performing solidly in the first two: in 2002–03 Spanish Cup Terrassa fought valiantly against Real Madrid, before bowing out 5–7 on aggregate, thanks to longtime midfielder Monty who scored three goals in the tie. A fourth Catalonia Cup was added with a win at CF Gavà, before the team eventually returned to the third level at the end of 2004–05 season, as third from bottom.

Former Spanish international Juanele played one of his last professional campaigns with the club.

== Season to season ==
Season	Tier	Division	Place	Copa del Rey
1939–40	5	1ª Reg. B	4th	
1940–41	4	1ª Reg. A	7th	
1941–42	3	1ª Reg. A	1st	
1942–43	2	2ª	5th	
1943–44	3	3ª	4th	
1944–45	3	3ª	10th	
1945–46	3	3ª	9th	
1946–47	3	3ª	10th	
1947–48	3	3ª	5th	
1948–49	3	3ª	5th	
1949–50	3	3ª	8th	
1950–51	3	3ª	2nd	
1951–52	3	3ª	3rd	
1952–53	3	3ª	3rd	
1953–54	3	3ª	1st	
1954–55	2	2ª	14th	
1955–56	2	2ª	9th	
1956–57	2	2ª	13th	
1957–58	2	2ª	14th	
1958–59	2	2ª	12th	

Season	Tier	Division	Place	Copa del Rey
1959–60	2	2ª	6th	
1960–61	2	2ª	16th	
1961–62	3	3ª	1st	
1962–63	3	3ª	9th	
1963–64	3	3ª	4th	
1964–65	3	3ª	10th	
1965–66	3	3ª	4th	
1966–67	3	3ª	7th	
1967–68	3	3ª	2nd	
1968–69	3	3ª	2nd	
1969–70	3	3ª	1st	
1970–71	3	3ª	3rd	
1971–72	3	3ª	2nd	
1972–73	3	3ª	11th	
1973–74	3	3ª	4th	
1974–75	3	3ª	1st	
1975–76	2	2ª	16th	
1976–77	2	2ª	7th	
1977–78	2	2ª	12th	
1978–79	2	2ª	18th	

Season	Tier	Division	Place	Copa del Rey
1979–80	3	2ª B	5th	
1980–81	3	2ª B	15th	
1981–82	3	2ª B	18th	
1982–83	4	3ª	8th	
1983–84	4	3ª	18th	
1984–85	4	3ª	3rd	
1985–86	4	3ª	6th	
1986–87	4	3ª	3rd	
1987–88	3	2ª B	3rd	
1988–89	3	2ª B	19th	
1989–90	4	3ª	18th	
1990–91	5	Reg. Pref.	5th	
1991–92	5	1ª Cat.	2nd	
1992–93	4	3ª	7th	
1993–94	4	3ª	2nd	
1994–95	3	2ª B	13th	
1995–96	3	2ª B	5th	
1996–97	3	2ª B	5th	
1997–98	3	2ª B	2nd	
1998–99	3	2ª B	5th	

Season	Tier	Division	Place	Copa del Rey
1999–2000	3	2ª B	15th	
2000–01	3	2ª B	12th	
2001–02	3	2ª B	5th	
2002–03	2	2ª	12th	
2003–04	2	2ª	12th	
2004–05	2	2ª	20th	
2005–06	3	2ª B	10th	
2006–07	3	2ª B	6th	
2007–08	3	2ª B	15th	
2008–09	3	2ª B	16th	
2009–10	3	2ª B	20th	
2010–11	4	3ª	12th	
2011–12	4	3ª	7th	
2012–13	4	3ª	6th	
2013–14	4	3ª	4th	
2014–15	4	3ª	7th	
2015–16	4	3ª	13th	
2016–17	4	3ª	3rd	
2017–18	4	3ª	4th	
2018–19	4	3ª	8th	

Season	Tier	Division	Place	Copa del Rey
2019–20	4	3ª	2nd	
2020–21	4	3ª	3rd	
2021–22	4	2ª RFEF	8th	
2022–23	4	2ª Fed.	6th	
2023–24	4	2ª Fed.	6th	Second round
2024–25	4	2ª Fed.	8th	
2025–26	4	2ª Fed.	8th	
2026–27	4	2ª Fed.		

- 15 seasons in Segunda División
- 18 seasons in Segunda División B
- 6 seasons in Segunda Federación/Segunda División RFEF
- 44 seasons in Tercera División
- 5 seasons in Categorías Regionales

== Honours ==
- Tercera División
  - Champions (4): 1953–54, 1961–62, 1969–70, 1974–75
- Copa Catalunya
  - Winners (4): 1925, 1936, 2002, 2003

== Current squad ==
As of 8 February 2026

Note: Flags indicate national team as defined under FIFA eligibility rules; some limited exceptions apply. Players may hold more than one non-FIFA nationality.

No.	Pos.	Nation	Player
1	GK	ESP	Marcos Pérez
2	DF	ESP	Jon Larrauri
3	DF	NED	Sem Dirks
4	DF	ESP	Iker Reche
5	DF	NED	Erik Schouten
6	DF	ESP	Isma Estevez
7	MF	ESP	Gil Muntadas
8	MF	ESP	Sergio Cortés
9	FW	ESP	Aythami Perera
10	FW	ESP	Alberto Gutiérrez
11	FW	NED	Dano Lourens

No.	Pos.	Nation	Player
12	MF	ESP	Cristhian Mármol
13	GK	ESP	Iván Biarge
14	MF	ESP	Jaime Barrero
15	MF	ESP	José Miguel Castañeda
17	FW	NED	Quinten van den Heerik
18	DF	ESP	Marío Domingo
19	FW	ESP	Joel Castillo
20	FW	ESP	Nahuel Arroyo
21	DF	ESP	Álvaro Martín
22	DF	ESP	Adrián Beamonte
23	FW	ESP	Larry Opara

== Famous players ==
Note: this list includes players that have appeared in at least 100 league games and/or have reached international status.

- (Andorra) (Spain) Marc Bernaus
- (Argentina) Iselín Santos Ovejero
- (Argentina) Rolando Zárate
- (Dominican Republic) Pedro Núñez
- (Nigeria) Haruna Babangida
- (Spain) Francisco Carrasco
- (Spain) Cristian
- (Spain) Juanele
- (Spain) Monty
- (Spain) José Miguel Morales
- (Spain) (Denmark) Thomas Christiansen
- (Spain) (Italy) Pier
- (Uruguay) Marco Vanzini
