= Real Murcia Imperial =

Association football club in Spain

- Full name: Real Murcia Club de Fútbol, S.A.D.
- Founded: 1922
- Ground: Campo de Fútbol Campus Universitario, Murcia, Murcia, Spain
- Capacity: 3,000
- President: Francisco Tornel
- Head coach: Carlos Cuéllar
- League: Segunda Federación – Group 3
- 2025–26: Tercera Federación – Group 13, 2nd of 18 (promoted via play-offs)
Home colours	Away colours

Real Murcia Club de Fútbol "B", also known as Real Murcia Imperial, is a Spanish football team based in Murcia, in the namesake community. Founded in 1922, it is the reserve team of Real Murcia and plays in Segunda Federación – Group 3, holding home games at Campus Universitario, with a 3,000-seat capacity.

== Club names ==
- As farm team:
  - Imperial de Murcia Fútbol Club (1922–1940)
  - Imperial de Murcia Club de Fútbol (1940–1993)
- As reserve team:
  - Real Murcia Club de Fútbol B (1993–present)

== Season to season ==
- As farm team

Season	Tier	Division	Place	Copa del Rey
1929–30	3	3ª	6th	
1930–31	4	1ª Reg.	3rd	
1931–32	3	3ª	4th	
1932–33	3	3ª	4th	
1933–34	3	3ª	3rd	
1939–40	2	2ª	8th	
1940–41	4	1ª Reg.	5th	
1941–42	3	1ª Reg.	3rd	
1942–43	3	1ª Reg.	8th	
1943–44	3	3ª	9th	
1944–45	3	3ª	4th	
1945–46	3	3ª	5th	
1946–47	3	3ª	4th	
1947–48	3	3ª	6th	
1948–49	3	3ª	4th	
1949–50	3	3ª	2nd	
1950–51	3	3ª	5th	
1951–52	3	3ª	7th	
1952–53	DNP			
1953–54	DNP			

Season	Tier	Division	Place	Copa del Rey
1954–55	3	3ª	7th	
1955–56	3	3ª	8th	
1956–57	3	3ª	3rd	
1957–58	3	3ª	3rd	
1958–59	3	3ª	9th	
1959–60	3	3ª	3rd	
1960–61	3	3ª	3rd	
1961–62	3	3ª	2nd	
1962–63	3	3ª	7th	
1963–64	3	3ª	5th	
1964–65	3	3ª	3rd	
1965–66	3	3ª	6th	
1966–67	3	3ª	11th	
1967–68	3	3ª	8th	
1968–69	3	3ª	13th	
1969–70	3	3ª	7th	
1970–71	3	3ª	18th	
1971–72	4	Reg. Pref.	3rd	
1972–73	4	Reg. Pref.	5th	
1973–74	4	Reg. Pref.	14th	

Season	Tier	Division	Place	Copa del Rey
1974–75	4	Reg. Pref.	5th	
1975–76	4	Reg. Pref.	8th	
1976–77	4	Reg. Pref.	6th	
1977–78	5	Reg. Pref.	6th	
1978–79	5	Reg. Pref.	6th	
1979–80	5	Reg. Pref.	5th	
1980–81	4	3ª	4th	
1981–82	4	3ª	16th	
1982–83	4	3ª	3rd	
1983–84	4	3ª	10th	

Season	Tier	Division	Place	Copa del Rey
1984–85	4	3ª	4th	
1985–86	4	3ª	7th	
1986–87	4	3ª	12th	
1987–88	4	3ª	9th	
1988–89	4	3ª	9th	
1989–90	4	3ª	4th	
1990–91	4	3ª	2nd	
1991–92	4	3ª	3rd	
1992–93	4	3ª	15th	

- As reserve team

Season	Tier	Division	Place
1993–94	4	3ª	5th
1994–95	4	3ª	17th
1995–96	5	Reg. Pref.	9th
1996–97	4	3ª	9th
1997–98	4	3ª	9th
1998–99	4	3ª	11th
1999–2000	4	3ª	9th
2000–01	4	3ª	10th
2001–02	4	3ª	9th
2002–03	4	3ª	6th
2003–04	4	3ª	7th
2004–05	4	3ª	6th
2005–06	4	3ª	6th
2006–07	4	3ª	1st
2007–08	4	3ª	3rd
2008–09	3	2ªB	5th
2009–10	3	2ªB	13th
2010–11	4	3ª	2nd
2011–12	4	3ª	7th
2012–13	4	3ª	7th

Season	Tier	Division	Place
2013–14	4	3ª	9th
2014–15	4	3ª	2nd
2015–16	4	3ª	9th
2016–17	4	3ª	6th
2017–18	4	3ª	16th
2018–19	4	3ª	13th
2019–20	4	3ª	4th
2020–21	4	3ª	1st / 6th
2021–22	5	3ª RFEF	7th
2022–23	5	3ª Fed.	7th
2023–24	5	3ª Fed.	2nd
2024–25	5	3ª Fed.	8th
2025–26	5	3ª Fed.	2nd
2026–27	4	2ª Fed.	

- 1 season in Segunda División
- 2 seasons in Segunda División B
- 1 season in Segunda Federación
- 68 seasons in Tercera División
- 5 seasons in Tercera Federación/Tercera División RFEF

== Honours ==
- Tercera División (1): 2006–07
