= 1947–48 Tercera División =

Tercera División
- Season: 1947–48

The 1947–48 Tercera División was the 12th edition of the Spanish national third tier.

== Format ==
8 geographic groups of 14 clubs (112 in total) participated. The 8 group champions qualified for the Fase Intermedia which comprised 2 groups of four clubs playing a round robin. The group winners and runners up qualified for the Fase_Final which was another round robin with the top two clubs earning promotion to Segunda División.

== Group 1 ==
Pos	Team	Pld	W	D	L	GF	GA	GD	Pts	Qualification or relegation
1	Pontevedra	26	15	7	4	75	33	+42	37	Fase Intermedia
2	Orensana	26	16	4	6	63	40	+23	36	
3	Berbés	26	15	5	6	97	56	+41	35	
4	Arosa	26	12	7	7	44	40	+4	31	
5	Lucense	26	12	6	8	75	53	+22	30	
6	At. Zamora	26	13	1	12	61	62	−1	27	
7	Juvenil	26	12	3	11	50	47	+3	27	
8	Cultural Leonesa	26	11	4	11	61	49	+12	26	
9	Arsenal Ferrol	26	9	6	11	50	50	0	24	
10	Santiago	26	9	6	11	47	58	−11	24	Relegation play-offs
11	Maestranza Aérea León	26	6	10	10	36	48	−12	22	Relegation play-offs
12	Lemos	26	8	5	13	36	42	−6	21	Relegation to Regional
13	Ponferradina	26	6	7	13	29	59	−30	19	Relegation to Regional
14	Betanzos	26	2	1	23	18	105	−87	4 (Note: One point deducted for fielding ineligible player against Arosa. 2-1 win recorded as defeat. Betanzos failed to play their home games against Maestranza and Ponferradina and their away game at Ponferradina. Recorded as defeats.)	Relegation to Regional

== Group 2 ==
Pos	Team	Pld	W	D	L	GF	GA	GD	Pts	Qualification or relegation
1	Santander	26	21	2	3	81	20	+61	44	Fase Intermedia
2	Gim. Torrelavega	26	15	3	8	68	50	+18	33	
3	Gim. Burgalesa	26	13	7	6	60	33	+27	33	
4	Barreda	26	14	4	8	59	42	+17	32	
5	Caudal	26	14	3	9	52	39	+13	31	
6	La Felguera	26	13	4	9	49	34	+15	30	
7	Avilés	26	14	2	10	61	46	+15	30	
8	Gijonés	26	12	5	9	46	40	+6	29	
9	F.N. Palencia	26	11	2	13	53	57	−4	24	
10	Mirandés	26	8	2	16	32	58	−26	18	Relegation play-offs
11	Juvencia	26	7	3	16	34	50	−16	17	Relegation play-offs
12	Langreano	26	7	3	16	36	71	−35	17	Relegation to Regional
13	Rayo Cantabria	26	5	4	17	30	63	−33	14	Relegation to Regional
14	Santoña	26	4	4	18	27	85	−58	12	Relegation to Regional

== Group 3 ==
Pos	Team	Pld	W	D	L	GF	GA	GD	Pts	Qualification or relegation
1	Osasuna	26	16	4	6	64	36	+28	36	Fase Intermedia
2	Maestranza Aérea Logroño	26	14	4	8	60	50	+10	32	
3	Zaragoza	26	13	5	8	83	38	+45	31	
4	Logroñés	26	13	5	8	69	54	+15	31	
5	Real Unión	26	12	5	9	63	41	+22	29	
6	Sestao	26	10	7	9	43	39	+4	27	
7	Arenas Guecho	26	10	7	9	45	43	+2	27	
8	Erandio	26	10	7	9	44	53	−9	27	
9	Indauchu	26	10	7	9	61	56	+5	27	
10	Dep. Alavés	26	12	2	12	46	56	−10	26	Relegation play-offs
11	Cultural Durango	26	7	9	10	42	49	−7	23	Relegation play-offs
12	Guecho	26	8	6	12	44	60	−16	22	Relegation to Regional
13	Izarra	26	6	4	16	36	76	−40	16	Relegation to Regional
14	Tolosa	26	2	6	18	26	75	−49	10	Relegation to Regional

== Group 4 ==
Pos	Team	Pld	W	D	L	GF	GA	GD	Pts	Qualification or relegation
1	Huesca	26	18	1	7	71	34	+37	37	Fase Intermedia
2	Segarra	26	12	11	3	60	28	+32	35	
3	Escoriaza	26	15	4	7	61	38	+23	34	
4	Sueca	26	14	3	9	62	48	+14	31	
5	At. Zaragoza	26	15	1	10	74	40	+34	31	
6	Acero	26	13	4	9	47	55	−8	30	
7	Olímpico	26	12	6	8	63	43	+20	30	
8	Arenas Zaragoza	26	13	3	10	63	44	+19	29	
9	Tudelano	26	12	3	11	47	50	−3	27	
10	Conquense	26	10	6	10	44	50	−6	26	Relegation play-offs
11	Numancia	26	11	4	11	54	44	+10	26	Relegation play-offs
12	Tauste	26	6	3	17	35	67	−32	15	Relegation to Regional
13	Saguntino	26	2	5	19	30	85	−55	9	Relegation to Regional
14	Belchite	26	0	4	22	17	102	−85	4	Relegation to Regional

== Group 5 ==
Pos	Team	Pld	W	D	L	GF	GA	GD	Pts	Qualification or relegation
1	Gerona	26	18	4	4	71	38	+33	40	Fase Intermedia
2	San Andrés	26	14	5	7	67	39	+28	33	
3	Júpiter	26	12	7	7	46	29	+17	31	
4	Lérida	26	12	5	9	48	35	+13	29	
5	Tarrasa	26	11	3	12	48	50	−2	25	
6	Constancia	26	9	7	10	45	47	−2	25	
7	Igualada	26	10	5	11	41	54	−13	25	
8	At. Baleares	26	9	7	10	42	49	−7	25	
9	San Martín	26	10	5	11	38	51	−13	25	
10	España Industrial	26	10	4	12	47	43	+4	24	Relegation play-offs
11	Sans	26	8	8	10	42	46	−4	24	Relegation play-offs
12	Reus	26	10	4	12	41	51	−10	24	Relegation to Regional
13	Tortosa	26	8	5	13	40	45	−5	21	Relegation to Regional
14	Granollers	26	5	3	18	32	71	−39	13	Relegation to Regional

== Group 6 ==
Pos	Team	Pld	W	D	L	GF	GA	GD	Pts	Qualification or relegation
1	Salamanca	26	20	2	4	76	32	+44	42	Fase Intermedia
2	Betis	26	15	5	6	59	22	+37	35	
3	Badajoz	26	16	2	8	79	39	+40	34	
4	Cacereño	26	14	4	8	70	58	+12	32	
5	Plus Ultra	26	13	4	9	73	45	+28	30	
6	Gim. Segoviana	26	12	5	9	62	53	+9	29	
7	Toledo	26	11	4	11	64	68	−4	26	
8	Talavera	26	11	2	13	61	71	−10	24	
9	Tomelloso	26	12	0	14	55	59	−4	24	
10	Gim. Alcázar	26	9	4	13	46	75	−29	22	Relegation play-offs
11	Ávila	26	10	1	15	60	55	+5	21	Relegation play-offs
12	Manchego	26	8	3	15	36	60	−24	19	Relegation to Regional
13	Ferroviaria	26	6	4	16	36	83	−47	16	Relegation to Regional
14	Chamberí	26	4	2	20	25	82	−57	10	Relegation to Regional

Note: Manchego were reprieved following the resignation of other clubs.

== Group 7 ==
Pos	Team	Pld	W	D	L	GF	GA	GD	Pts	Qualification or relegation
1	Elche	26	17	4	5	72	36	+36	38	Fase Intermedia
2	Cartagena	26	17	3	6	66	23	+43	37	
3	Albacete	26	16	3	7	62	38	+24	35	
4	Alicante	26	15	3	8	80	44	+36	33	
5	Eldense	26	13	5	8	49	45	+4	31	
6	Imperial	26	11	5	10	61	43	+18	27	
7	Almería	26	12	3	11	49	48	+1	27	
8	Jaén	26	10	6	10	71	53	+18	26	
9	Cieza	26	9	4	13	39	57	−18	22	
10	Almoradí	26	10	1	15	47	71	−24	21	Relegation play-offs
11	Orihuela	26	6	8	12	54	65	−11	20	Relegation play-offs
12	At. Linares	26	8	4	14	40	87	−47	20	Relegation to Regional
13	Crevillente	26	5	5	16	35	69	−34	15	Relegation to Regional
14	Gim. Abad	26	3	6	17	29	75	−46	12	Relegation to Regional

== Group 8 ==
Pos	Team	Pld	W	D	L	GF	GA	GD	Pts	Qualification or relegation
1	Melilla	26	19	2	5	58	29	+29	40	Fase Intermedia
2	Recreativo de Huelva	26	16	3	7	84	36	+48	35	
3	Linense	26	16	3	7	70	38	+32	35	
4	Ceuta	26	13	3	10	64	55	+9	29	
5	Cádiz	26	11	6	9	48	47	+1	28	
6	Iliturgi	26	11	4	11	68	56	+12	26	
7	Larache	26	12	2	12	51	55	−4	26	
8	At. Tetuán	26	11	3	12	60	58	+2	25	
9	Algeciras	26	11	2	13	75	64	+11	24	
10	Electromecánicas	26	9	6	11	55	73	−18	24	Relegation play-offs
11	San Fernando	26	10	3	13	48	66	−18	23	Relegation play-offs
12	Coria	26	6	7	13	36	56	−20	19	Relegation to Regional
13	Antequerano	26	7	5	14	38	59	−21	19	Relegation to Regional
14	Calavera	26	5	1	20	30	93	−63	11	Relegation to Regional

== Fase Intermedia ==
=== Group I ===
Pos	Team	Pld	W	D	L	GF	GA	GD	Pts	Qualification
1	Santander	6	4	2	0	11	2	+9	10	Final Phase
2	Salamanca	6	3	2	1	15	5	+10	8	Final Phase
3	Osasuna	6	1	2	3	8	15	−7	4	
4	Pontevedra	6	1	0	5	8	20	−12	2	

=== Group II ===
Pos	Team	Pld	W	D	L	GF	GA	GD	Pts	Qualification
1	Melilla	6	3	1	2	9	9	0	7	Final Phase
2	Gerona	6	3	0	3	12	10	+2	6	Final Phase
3	Elche	6	2	2	2	13	14	−1	6	
4	Huesca	6	2	1	3	8	9	−1	5	

== Tercera División Fase Final ==
Pos	Team	Pld	W	D	L	GF	GA	GD	Pts	Promotion
1	Santander	6	4	1	1	14	8	+6	9	Promotion to Segunda División
2	Gerona	6	4	0	2	10	11	−1	8	Promotion to Segunda División
3	Salamanca	6	3	0	3	15	10	+5	6	
4	Melilla	6	0	1	5	6	16	−10	1	

== Permanencia Tercera División ==
=== Group I ===
Pos	Team	Pld	W	D	L	GF	GA	GD	Pts	Relegation
1	Ávila	6	6	0	0	24	5	+19	12	
2	Juvencia	6	2	1	3	10	8	+2	5	Relegation to Regional
3	Maestranza Aérea	6	2	0	4	23	14	+9	4	Relegation to Regional
4	Santiago	6	1	1	4	6	36	−30	1 (Note: 3 points deducted. All clubs liable for relegation were reprieved following the resignation of other teams.)	Relegation to Regional

=== Group II ===
Pos	Team	Pld	W	D	L	GF	GA	GD	Pts	Relegation
1	Mirandés	6	4	0	2	12	7	+5	8	
2	Cultural Durango	6	4	0	2	15	11	+4	8	Relegation to Regional
3	Numancia	6	2	0	4	12	9	+3	4	Relegation to Regional
4	Dep. Alavés	6	2	0	4	5	17	−12	4	Relegation to Regional

Note: Numancia and Dep. Alavés were reprieved following the resignation of other teams.

=== Group III ===
Pos	Team	Pld	W	D	L	GF	GA	GD	Pts	Relegation
1	Electromecánicas	6	4	0	2	16	8	+8	8	
2	San Fernando	6	3	0	3	16	16	0	6	Relegation to Regional
3	Conquense	6	3	0	3	16	19	−3	6	Relegation to Regional
4	Gim. Alcázar	6	2	0	4	17	22	−5	4	Relegation to Regional

Note: Conquense were reprieved following the resignation of other teams.

=== Group IV ===
Pos	Team	Pld	W	D	L	GF	GA	GD	Pts	Relegation
1	Orihuela	6	4	0	2	14	9	+5	8	
2	España Industrial	6	4	0	2	10	10	0	8	Relegation to Regional
3	Sans	6	3	0	3	18	13	+5	6	Relegation to Regional
4	Almoradí	6	1	0	5	7	17	−10	2	Relegation to Regional
