= AD Ferroviaria =

Association football club in Spain

Ferroviaria
- Full name: Agrupación Deportiva Ferroviaria
- Nickname: La Ferro
- Founded: 1918
- Ground: Ernesto Cotorruelo, Madrid, Spain
- Capacity: 1,500
- League: Primera de Aficionados – Group 5
- 2025–26: Segunda de Aficionados – Group 18, 1st of 14 (champions)
| Home colours | Away colours |

Agrupación Deportiva Ferroviaria is a football team based in Madrid, in the Community of Madrid. Founded in 1918, the club plays in Primera de Aficionados – Group 5.

== History ==
The club was founded in December, 1918 with Leocadio Martín Ruiz as its first president. The club withdrew from playing in 2007, and their last season (2006/07) the team played in Segunda Regional de Aficionados.

For the 2019–20 season, Ferroviaria returned to an active status, playing in Tercera Regional de Aficionados.

== Season to season ==
| Season | Tier | Division | Place | Copa del Rey |
|---|---|---|---|---|
| 1932–33 | 3 | 3ª | 4th | |
| 1933–34 | 3 | 3ª | 1st | |
| 1934–35 | 4 | 1ª Reg. | 1st | |
| 1935–36 | 4 | 1ª Reg. | 2nd | |
| 1939–40 | 2 | 2ª | 2nd | |
| 1940–41 | 3 | 3ª | 2nd | |
| 1941–42 | 2 | 2ª | 7th | |
| 1942–43 | 2 | 2ª | 7th | |
| 1943–44 | 3 | 3ª | 8th | |
| 1944–45 | 3 | 3ª | 7th | |
| 1945–46 | 3 | 3ª | 5th | |
| 1946–47 | 3 | 3ª | 4th | |
| 1947–48 | 3 | 3ª | 13th | |
| 1948–49 | 4 | 1ª Reg. | 2nd | |
| 1949–50 | 4 | 1ª Reg. | 8th | |
| 1950–51 | 4 | 1ª Reg. | 10th | |
| 1951–52 | 4 | 1ª Reg. | 4th | |
| 1952–53 | 4 | 1ª Reg. | 7th | |
| 1953–54 | 4 | 1ª Reg. | 15th | |
| 1954–55 | 4 | 1ª Reg. | 6th | |
| 1955–56 | 5 | 2ª Reg. | 10th | |

| Season | Tier | Division | Place | Copa del Rey |
|---|---|---|---|---|
| 1956–57 | 5 | 2ª Reg. | 1st | |
| 1957–58 | 4 | 1ª Reg. | 12th | |
| 1958–59 | 5 | 2ª Reg. | 11th | |
| 1959–60 | 5 | 2ª Reg. | 10th | |
| 1960–61 | 5 | 2ª Reg. | 16th | |
| 1961–62 | 6 | 3ª Reg. | 10th | |
| 1962–63 | 6 | 3ª Reg. | 14th | |
| 1963–64 | 6 | 3ª Reg. | 7th | |
| 1964–65 | 6 | 3ª Reg. | 12th | |
| 1965–66 | 6 | 3ª Reg. | 11th | |
| 1966–67 | 6 | 3ª Reg. | 10th | |
| 1967–68 | 6 | 3ª Reg. | 6th | |
| 1968–69 | 6 | 3ª Reg. | 3rd | |
| 1969–70 | 6 | 3ª Reg. P. | 18th | |
| 1970–71 | 7 | 3ª Reg. | 11th | |
| 1971–72 | 7 | 3ª Reg. | 9th | |
| 1972–73 | 7 | 3ª Reg. | 3rd | |
| 1973–74 | 7 | 3ª Reg. | 9th | |
| 1974–75 | 7 | 3ª Reg. | 3rd | |
| 1975–76 | 6 | 3ª Reg. P. | 20th | |
| 1976–77 | 7 | 3ª Reg. | | |

| Season | Tier | Division | Place | Copa del Rey |
|---|---|---|---|---|
| 1977–78 | 8 | 3ª Reg. | 4th | |
| 1978–79 | 8 | 3ª Reg. | | |
| 1979–80 | 6 | 3ª Reg. P. | 17th | |
| 1980–81 | 8 | 3ª Reg. | 3rd | |
| 1981–82 | 8 | 3ª Reg. | 14th | |
| 1982–83 | 8 | 3ª Reg. | 12th | |
| 1983–84 | 8 | 3ª Reg. | 14th | |
| 1984–85 | 8 | 3ª Reg. | 9th | |
| 1985–86 | 8 | 3ª Reg. | 2nd | |
| 1986–87 | 8 | 3ª Reg. | 2nd | |
| 1987–88 | 7 | 2ª Reg. | 15th | |
| 1988–89 | 7 | 2ª Reg. | 18th | |
| 1989–90 | 8 | 3ª Reg. | 9th | |
| 1990–91 | 8 | 3ª Reg. | 8th | |
| 1991–92 | 8 | 3ª Reg. | 4th | |
| 1992–93 | 8 | 3ª Reg. | 5th | |
| 1993–94 | 8 | 3ª Reg. | 6th | |
| 1994–95 | 8 | 3ª Reg. | 2nd | |
| 1995–96 | 7 | 2ª Reg. | 9th | |
| 1996–97 | 7 | 2ª Reg. | 9th | |

| Season | Tier | Division | Place | Copa del Rey |
|---|---|---|---|---|
| 1997–98 | 7 | 2ª Reg. | 15th | |
| 1998–99 | 7 | 2ª Reg. | 15th | |
| 1999–2000 | 7 | 2ª Reg. | 17th | |
| 2000–01 | 8 | 3ª Reg. | 11th | |
| 2001–02 | 8 | 3ª Reg. | 10th | |
| 2002–03 | 8 | 3ª Reg. | 9th | |
| 2003–04 | 8 | 3ª Reg. | 7th | |
| 2004–05 | 8 | 3ª Reg. | 2nd | |
| 2005–06 | 7 | 2ª Reg. | 5th | |
| 2006–07 | 7 | 2ª Reg. | 6th | |
| 2007–08 | 7 | 2ª Reg. | (R) | |
| 2008–2019 | DNP | | | |
| 2019–20 | 8 | 3ª Afic. | 4th | |
| 2020–21 | 8 | 3ª Afic. | 8th | |
| 2021–22 | 9 | 3ª Afic. | 4th | |
| 2022–23 | 9 | 3ª Afic. | 7th | |
| 2023–24 | 9 | 3ª Afic. | 5th | |
| 2024–25 | 9 | 2ª Afic. | 5th | |
| 2025–26 | 9 | 2ª Afic. | 1st | |

- 3 seasons in Segunda División
- 9 seasons in Tercera División

== Uniform ==

| Ferroviaria 20's: Home colours / Away colours | Ferroviaria 90's: Home colours / Away colours |

== Famous players ==
- Tomás Castro
- Joaquín Peiró
- Mingorance Teo

== Famous Coaches ==
- Alfonso Sanz

== Chairmans ==
| Name | From | To |
|---|---|---|
| (Spain) Mr. Martín | 1918 | 1920 |
| (Spain) ¿? | 1920 | ... |

== Stadiums ==
The club started playing in the field of Vallehermoso until the year 1920, which opened Las Delicias. During the 50s, it did in the field of Gas CF, was the last field Ernesto Cotorruelo.

== Honours ==
- Copa Luzán
- Campeón de Castilla y de España de aficionados
