= 1946–47 Tercera División =

Tercera División
- Season: 1946–47

The 1946–47 Tercera División was the 11th edition of the Spanish national third tier.

== Format ==
120 clubs in 12 geographic groups of 10 participated. The winner and runner up of each group (24 teams) progressed to the second phase (Fase Intermedia). In the second phase 3 groups of 8 teams were formed with each club playing home and away matches (14 matches each). The winners and runners up (6 teams) entered the Fase Final and played home and away against each other (10 matches each). The winner and runner up of the Fase Final were promoted to the Segunda División, and the third placed team played off in a promotion/relegation tie against the 12th placed team in the Segunda División.

== Regular season ==
=== Group 1 ===
Pos	Team	Pld	W	D	L	GF	GA	GD	Pts	Qualification
1	Pontevedra	18	13	2	3	39	26	+13	28	Second Phase
2	Lucense	18	12	0	6	40	19	+21	24	Second Phase
3	Juvenil	18	9	3	6	51	32	+19	21	
4	Santiago	18	9	2	7	34	32	+2	20	
5	Orensana	18	10	3	5	44	23	+21	19 (Note: deducted 4 points for "irregularities" in their away game at Berbés)	
6	Lemos	18	8	3	7	33	30	+3	19	
7	Berbés	18	9	2	7	36	30	+6	15 (Note: deducted 5 points for "irregularities" in their home game against Orensana)	
8	Galicia Ferrol	18	5	4	9	29	41	−12	14	
9	Betanzos	18	1	5	12	14	58	−44	7	
10	Turista	18	1	2	15	16	45	−29	4	

=== Group 2 ===
Pos	Team	Pld	W	D	L	GF	GA	GD	Pts	Qualification
1	F.N. Palencia	18	9	6	3	39	16	+23	24	Second Phase
2	Cult. Leonesa	18	10	4	4	46	28	+18	24	Second Phase
3	Gijonés	18	9	5	4	46	28	+18	23	
4	Juvencia	18	8	4	6	46	37	+9	20	
5	Ponferradina	18	7	3	8	25	40	−15	17	
6	Avilés	18	7	3	8	27	24	+3	17	
7	La Felguera	18	5	6	7	38	33	+5	16	
8	Caudal	18	7	2	9	27	37	−10	16	
9	Maestranza A.	18	5	3	10	28	48	−20	13	
10	Langreano	18	2	6	10	19	50	−31	10	

=== Group 3 ===
Pos	Team	Pld	W	D	L	GF	GA	GD	Pts	Qualification
1	Arenas Guecho	18	13	4	1	46	22	+24	30	Second Phase
2	Indauchu	18	12	1	5	44	32	+12	25	Second Phase
3	Erandio	18	9	3	6	29	27	+2	21	
4	Rayo Cantabria	18	7	4	7	30	40	−10	18	
5	Barreda	18	7	2	9	38	36	+2	16	
6	Gim. Torrelavega	18	6	4	8	43	34	+9	16	
7	Cultural Durango	18	6	3	9	30	34	−4	15	
8	Guecho	18	4	6	8	30	44	−14	14	
9	Sestao	18	5	3	10	28	34	−6	13	
10	Santoña	18	5	2	11	27	42	−15	12	

=== Group 4 ===
Pos	Team	Pld	W	D	L	GF	GA	GD	Pts	Qualification
1	Gim. Burgalesa	18	14	3	1	66	11	+55	31	Second Phase
2	Osasuna	18	12	4	2	53	28	+25	28	Second Phase
3	Logroñés	18	9	5	4	40	22	+18	23	
4	Maestranza A. Logroño	18	6	5	7	44	39	+5	17	
5	Real Unión	18	6	5	7	29	29	0	17	
6	Villafranca	18	7	2	9	29	41	−12	16	
7	Dep. Alavés	18	7	2	9	41	42	−1	16	
8	Mirandés	18	5	4	9	25	41	−16	14	
9	Tolosa	18	4	3	11	23	54	−31	11	
10	Izarra	18	2	3	13	27	70	−43	7	

=== Group 5 ===
Pos	Team	Pld	W	D	L	GF	GA	GD	Pts	Qualification
1	At. Zaragoza	18	14	1	3	52	24	+28	29	Second Phase
2	Arenas Zaragoza	18	13	2	3	53	14	+39	28	Second Phase
3	Lérida	18	13	1	4	45	23	+22	27	
4	Numancia	18	8	4	6	39	31	+8	20	
5	Huesca	18	6	3	9	33	35	−2	15	
6	Tudelano	18	6	2	10	30	47	−17	14	
7	Mequinenza	18	7	1	10	31	53	−22	14 (Note: docked 1 point)	
8	Escoriaza	18	6	2	10	25	35	−10	14	
9	Belchite	18	3	5	10	17	31	−14	11	
10	Tauste	18	1	5	12	10	42	−32	7	

=== Group 6 ===
Pos	Team	Pld	W	D	L	GF	GA	GD	Pts	Qualification
1	Badalona	18	11	3	4	44	21	+23	25	Second Phase
2	Júpiter	18	8	4	6	33	23	+10	20	Second Phase
3	San Martín	18	8	4	6	26	28	−2	20	
4	Gerona	18	9	2	7	35	24	+11	20	
5	Igualada	18	8	3	7	27	30	−3	19	
6	Sans	18	7	3	8	27	28	−1	17	
7	Granollers	18	8	0	10	32	45	−13	16	
8	Tortosa	18	5	5	8	33	32	+1	15	
9	Reus	18	7	0	11	19	30	−11	14	
10	Tarrasa	18	5	4	9	22	37	−15	14	

=== Group 7 ===
Pos	Team	Pld	W	D	L	GF	GA	GD	Pts	Qualification
1	Valladolid	18	14	2	2	65	21	+44	30	Second Phase
2	Salamanca	18	11	4	3	63	23	+40	26	Second Phase
3	Gim. Segoviana	18	12	1	5	54	31	+23	25	
4	Alas Valladolid	18	9	4	5	41	29	+12	22	
5	Ávila	18	8	3	7	48	35	+13	19	
6	Cacereño	18	9	1	8	58	39	+19	19	
7	Talavera	18	5	5	8	31	37	−6	15	
8	At. Zamora	18	6	2	10	35	50	−15	14	
9	Plasencia	18	2	2	14	27	75	−48	6	
10	Béjar	18	1	2	15	22	104	−82	4	

=== Group 8 ===
Pos	Team	Pld	W	D	L	GF	GA	GD	Pts	Qualification
1	Albacete	18	13	1	4	68	26	+42	27	Second Phase
2	Tomelloso	18	11	3	4	44	30	+14	25	Second Phase
3	Toledo	18	10	4	4	43	23	+20	24	
4	Ferroviaria	18	8	3	7	50	39	+11	19	
5	Plus Ultra	18	8	3	7	43	31	+12	19	
6	Mediodía	18	6	6	6	28	33	−5	18	
7	Manchego	18	6	3	9	37	57	−20	15	
8	Gim. Alcázar	18	5	3	10	25	50	−25	13	
9	Conquense	18	4	3	11	25	52	−27	11	
10	Imperio M.	18	2	5	11	15	37	−22	9	

=== Group 9 ===
Pos	Team	Pld	W	D	L	GF	GA	GD	Pts	Qualification
1	Segarra	18	14	1	3	60	17	+43	29	Second Phase
2	Mestalla	18	13	2	3	56	26	+30	28	Second Phase
3	At. Baleares	18	13	1	4	58	23	+35	27	
4	Olímpico	18	6	5	7	33	37	−4	17	
5	Constancia	18	7	2	9	27	39	−12	16	
6	Malvarrosa	18	7	1	10	36	48	−12	15	
7	Acero	18	5	3	10	34	44	−10	13	
8	Sueca	18	5	3	10	23	40	−17	13	
9	Carcagente	18	4	5	9	20	52	−32	13	
10	Saguntino	18	3	3	12	22	43	−21	9	

=== Group 10 ===
Pos	Team	Pld	W	D	L	GF	GA	GD	Pts	Qualification
1	Recreativo Huelva	18	15	1	2	63	18	+45	31	Second Phase
2	Ol. Jienense	18	12	4	2	55	18	+37	28	Second Phase
3	Badajoz	18	10	5	3	43	17	+26	25	
4	Coria	18	11	3	4	42	19	+23	25	
5	Egabrense	18	9	4	5	52	30	+22	22	
6	Electromecánicas	18	5	4	9	24	47	−23	14	
7	Emeritense	18	3	4	11	28	65	−37	10	
8	Calavera	18	3	4	11	17	54	−37	10	
9	Lucena	18	3	2	13	21	47	−26	6 (Note: docked 2 points each. Lucena failed to appear at Calavera. At. Linares failed to appear at Lucena.)	
10	At. Linares	18	2	3	13	18	48	−30	5	

=== Group 11 ===
Pos	Team	Pld	W	D	L	GF	GA	GD	Pts	Qualification
1	Alicante	18	14	1	3	48	21	+27	29	Second Phase
2	Elche	18	11	4	3	39	23	+16	26	Second Phase
3	Cartagena	18	11	0	7	48	26	+22	22	
4	Imperial	18	10	1	7	53	27	+26	21	
5	Orihuela	18	7	3	8	44	42	+2	17	
6	Eldense	18	6	4	8	34	32	+2	16	
7	Cieza	18	6	3	9	29	45	−16	15	
8	Crevillente	18	6	2	10	29	46	−17	14	
9	Almansa	18	2	5	11	24	49	−25	9	
10	Gim. Abad	18	4	3	11	23	60	−37	9 (Note: docked 2 points after walking off the pitch in their match at Elche.)	

=== Group 12 ===
Pos	Team	Pld	W	D	L	GF	GA	GD	Pts	Qualification
1	Melilla	18	12	1	5	42	26	+16	25	Second Phase
2	Cádiz	18	11	2	5	36	31	+5	24	Second Phase
3	Ceuta	18	10	3	5	35	18	+17	23	
4	At. Tetuán	18	10	2	6	47	37	+10	22	
5	San Fernando	18	8	1	9	43	42	+1	17	
6	Algeciras	18	5	6	7	34	38	−4	16	
7	Antequerano	18	5	4	9	30	41	−11	14	
8	Linense	18	6	2	10	21	34	−13	14	
9	Larache	18	4	5	9	32	42	−10	13	
10	Almería	18	3	6	9	23	34	−11	12	

== Fase Intermedia (Second phase) ==
=== Group 1 ===
Pos	Team	Pld	W	D	L	GF	GA	GD	Pts	Qualification
1	Valladolid	10	5	5	0	20	5	+15	15	Final Phase
2	Salamanca	10	5	2	3	22	16	+6	12	Final Phase
3	Pontevedra	10	5	2	3	23	14	+9	12	
4	F.N. Palencia	10	4	1	5	15	23	−8	9	
5	Tomelloso	10	2	3	5	11	23	−12	7	
6	Lucense	10	2	1	7	15	25	−10	5	
–	Albacete	0	-	-	-	-	-	—	0	
–	Cultural Leonesa	0	-	-	-	-	-	—	0	

Note: Albacete and Cultural Leonesa were removed from the competition after being found guilty of match-fixing.

=== Group 2 ===
Pos	Team	Pld	W	D	L	GF	GA	GD	Pts	Qualification
1	Osasuna	14	8	4	2	40	24	+16	20	Final Phase
2	Badalona	14	9	1	4	30	24	+6	19	Final Phase
3	Gim. Burgalesa	14	7	3	4	30	23	+7	17	
4	Arenas Zaragoza	14	8	1	5	34	23	+11	17	
5	At. Zaragoza	14	5	3	6	26	25	+1	13	
6	Júpiter	14	5	3	6	25	28	−3	13	
7	Indauchu	14	3	1	10	30	51	−21	7	
8	Arenas Guecho	14	1	4	9	19	36	−17	6	

=== Group 3 ===
Pos	Team	Pld	W	D	L	GF	GA	GD	Pts	Qualification
1	Mestalla	14	6	4	4	24	17	+7	16	Final Phase
2	Melilla	14	7	2	5	22	24	−2	16	Final Phase
3	Elche	14	6	4	4	30	25	+5	16	
4	Segarra	14	7	1	6	28	26	+2	15	
5	Cádiz	14	6	2	6	25	25	0	14	
6	Ol. Jienense	14	5	2	7	25	33	−8	12	
7	Alicante	14	4	4	6	17	24	−7	12	
8	Recreativo Huelva	14	5	1	8	32	29	+3	11	

== Fase Final ==
Pos	Team	Pld	W	D	L	GF	GA	GD	Pts	Promotion or qualification
1	Mestalla	10	5	2	3	22	15	+7	12	Promotion to the Segunda División
2	Badalona	10	6	0	4	38	27	+11	12	Promotion to the Segunda División
3	Valladolid	10	5	1	4	31	19	+12	11	Promotion/relegation playoff
4	Osasuna	10	4	1	5	20	27	−7	9	
5	Salamanca	10	4	0	6	22	32	−10	8	
6	Melilla	10	3	2	5	15	28	−13	8	

=== Promotion/relegation playoff ===
Team 1	Score	Team 2
Santander	1 - 3	Valladolid

- Promotion to Segunda: Valladolid
- Relegation to Tercera: R. Santander
