= List of Granada CF seasons =

From 1931 Granada CF has played in the following levels of Spanish football:

- 27 seasons in La Liga
- 35 seasons in Segunda División
- 22 seasons in Segunda División B
- 5 seasons in Tercera División (third level before 1977–78)
- 2 seasons in Regional

== Key ==
Key to league record:

- Pld = Matches played
- W = Matches won
- D = Matches drawn
- L = Matches lost
- GF = Goals for
- GA = Goals against
- Pts = Points
- Pos = Final position

Key to divisions:

- 2ª = Segunda División
- 2ªB = Segunda División B
- 3ª = Tercera División
- 2Reg = Segunda Regional
- 3Reg = Tercera Regional

Key to rounds:

- W = Winners
- RU = Runners-up
- SF = Semi-finals
- QF = Quarter-finals
- R16 = Round of 16
- R32 = Round of 32
- R3 = Third round
- R2 = Second round
- R1 = First round
- PR = Preliminary round

Winners	Runners-up	Promoted	Relegated	League top scorer

== Seasons ==
Season	League									Cup	Other competitions		Top scorer(s)^{1}		Coach(es)
Season	Division	Pld	W	D	L	GF	GA	Pts	Pos	Cup	Competition	Result	Player(s)	Goals	Coach(es)
1931–32	3Reg	6	4	0	2	9	9	8	2nd		—		Antonio Bombillar Castillo	3	None
1932–33	2Reg	10	7	1	2	31	7	15	2nd		—		Pepe Carmona	17	None
1933–34	3ª	4	3	0	1	9	6	6	1st		—		Calderón	8	Antonio Rey
1934–35	2ª	14	6	1	7	22	22	13	7th	R1	—		Calderón	13	Antonio Rey Lippo Hertzka
1935–36	2ª	14	4	3	7	20	23	11	6th	R1	—		Calderón Victorio	6	Lippo Hertzka Juan Gómez Muros José Planas
1936–37	Spanish Civil War														
1937–38	Spanish Civil War														
1938–39	Spanish Civil War														
1939–40	2ª	14	9	4	1	36	16	22	2nd		—		Nin	10	Antonio Bombillar Manuel Valderrama Gaspar Rubio
1940–41	2ª	22	13	4	5	43	21	30	1st	R16	—		Cholín	15	Victoriano Santos Antonio Bonet
1941–42	La Liga	26	10	5	11	64	52	25	10th	QF	—		César	26	Paco Bru
1942–43	La Liga	26	9	4	13	56	68	22	12th	R1	—		Nicola	16	Paco Bru
1943–44	La Liga	26	9	8	9	41	46	26	8th	QF	—		Marín Safont	12	Esteban Platko
1944–45	La Liga	26	7	5	14	40	55	19	12th	SF	—		Nicola	22	Esteban Platko Emilio Vidal
1945–46	2ª	26	12	5	9	49	35	29	4th	QF	—		Trompi	11	Emilio Vidal Ignacio Alcorta "Cholín" Antonio Conde
1946–47	2ª	26	10	5	11	36	51	25	7th	R1	—		Morales Sosa	6	Antonio Conde José Millán
1947–48	2ª	26	10	4	12	48	57	24	7th	R32	—		Morales	13	Manuel Valderrama Ignacio Alcorta "Cholín"
1948–49	2ª	26	16	3	7	50	37	35	3rd	QF	—		Morales	25	Ignacio Alcorta "Cholín"
1949–50	2ª	30	14	2	14	71	53	30	9th	R2	—		Morales	16	Ignacio Alcorta "Cholín"
1950–51	2ª	28	13	4	11	52	52	30	7th		—		Callejo	11	Gaspar Rubio Paco Mas
1951–52	2ª	30	9	6	15	32	53	24	13th		—		Cháves	9	Ignacio Alcorta "Cholín" José Espadas
1952–53	2ª	30	13	4	13	52	55	30	9th	R16	—		Rafa	13	Manolo Ibáñez
1953–54	2ª	30	17	2	11	63	36	36	4th		—		Rafa	17	Manolo Ibáñez Adolfo Bracero
1954–55	2ª	30	17	4	9	54	25	38	3rd		—		Rafa	12	Rogelio Díaz "Lelé"
1955–56	2ª	30	12	5	13	64	57	29	8th		—		Rafa	25	Manolo Ibáñez Álvaro Pérez Vázquez
1956–57	2ª	38	22	3	13	79	45	47	1st		—		Navarro	21	Álvaro Pérez Vázquez Antonio Carmona Luis Casas "Pasarín"
1957–58	La Liga	30	11	2	17	35	53	24	13th	R16	—		Navarro	8	Alejandro Scopelli
1958–59	La Liga	30	11	4	15	30	43	26	13th	RU	—		Carranza Loren Vázquez	11	Alejandro Scopelli José Manuel González Janos Kálmar
1959–60	La Liga	30	10	5	15	38	52	25	12th	R2	—		Arsenio Carranza	8	Janos Kalmar
1960–61	La Liga	30	5	7	18	32	61	17	16th	R2	—		Rafa	10	Fernando Argila Francisco Trinchant
1961–62	2ª	30	15	6	9	48	34	36	3rd	R2	—		Lalo	18	Heriberto Herrera Constantino Errazquín
1962–63	2ª	30	12	6	12	38	29	30	6th	R2	—		Vargas	14	Álvaro Pérez Vázquez
1963–64	2ª	30	12	8	10	41	32	32	6th	R1	—		Pirri	11	José Millán José Sánchez "Trompi" Ignacio Eizaguirre Francisco Antúnez
1964–65	2ª	30	11	10	9	45	35	32	7th	R2	—		Miguel	17	Francisco Antúnez
1965–66	2ª	30	16	5	9	40	29	37	2nd	R1	—		Miguel	13	Janos Kálmar
1966–67	La Liga	30	8	7	15	32	46	23	14th	QF	—		Miguel	14	Ignacio Eizaguirre Manolo Ibáñez
1967–68	2ª	30	17	6	7	42	20	40	1st	R1	—		Ureña	12	José Iglesias "Joseíto"
1968–69	La Liga	30	11	7	12	26	38	29	8th	SF	—		Ureña	7	Marcel Domingo
1969–70	La Liga	30	8	10	12	20	31	26	12th	R16	—		Barrios	7	Néstor Rossi
1970–71	La Liga	30	10	8	12	33	34	28	10th	R16	—		Barrios	11	José Iglesias "Joseíto"
1971–72	La Liga	34	14	8	12	40	34	36	6th	R16	—		Porta	20	José Iglesias "Joseíto"
1972–73	La Liga	34	9	11	14	25	32	29	13th	QF	—		Porta	12	Bernardino Pérez "Pasieguito"
1973–74	La Liga	34	12	12	10	34	35	36	6th	QF	—		Quiles	10	José Iglesias "Joseíto"
1974–75	La Liga	34	10	11	13	35	47	31	15th	QF	—		Grande	9	José Iglesias "Joseíto" Constantino Errazquín Manolo Ibáñez
1975–76	La Liga	34	8	10	16	29	50	26	17th	R16	—		Lis Megido	6	Miguel Muñoz
1976–77	2ª	38	14	8	16	42	39	36	10th	R32	—		Lorenzo	12	Héctor Núñez Constantino Errazquín Vavá
1977–78	2ª	38	15	8	15	46	44	38	9th	R32	—		José Luis	17	Vavá Constantino Errazquín
1978–79	2ª	38	16	12	10	46	34	44	6th	R2	—		José Luis	19	Abdallah Ben Barek
1979–80	2ª	38	13	11	14	42	42	37	13th	R1	—		Jorgoso	9	Abdallah Ben Barek
1980–81	2ª	38	10	13	15	33	45	33	17th	R16	—		Jorgoso	10	Francisco Gento Manolo Ibáñez José Iglesias "Joseíto"
1981–82	2ªB	38	13	13	12	34	32	39	10th	R2	—		Vitoria	13	Eduardo Gómez "Lalo" José Mingorance Antonio Ruiz
1982–83	2ªB	38	22	9	7	51	29	53	1st	R2	—		Vitoria	12	Manuel Ruiz Sosa
1983–84	2ª	38	15	10	13	42	36	40	8th	R3	—		Kostic	9	Felipe Mesones
1984–85	2ª	38	12	9	17	32	46	33	18th	R1	—		Merayo	12	Nando Yosu José María Pellejero José Antonio Naya José María Pellejero
1985–86	2ªB	38	15	11	12	62	47	41	7th	R3	—		Paquito	25	Joaquín Peiró
1986–87	2ªB	42	22	12	8	55	39	56	3rd	R1	—		Manolo	31	Joaquín Peiró
1987–88	2ª	38	8	11	19	36	46	27	19th	R1	—		Manolo	11	Joaquín Peiró Manuel Ruiz Sosa
1988–89	2ªB	38	10	12	16	40	47	32	16th	R1	—		Merayo	8	"Lalo" José Luis Garre Pachín José Luis Garre Rafael Alcaide "Crispi" "Lalo"
1989–90	2ªB	38	17	12	19	58	36	46	4th		—		Barbancho Gilberto Merayo	8	José Enrique Díaz José Luis Garre
1990–91	2ªB	38	15	17	6	49	29	47	5th	R1	—		Cuevas	12	José Luis Garre
1991–92	2ªB	38	14	12	12	47	43	40	9th	R1	—		Barrio	9	Juan Corbacho José Parejo
1992–93	2ªB	36	20	8	8	49	33	48	3rd	R3	—		Andrés González	14	Nando Yosu
1993–94	2ªB	38	17	12	9	52	37	46	6th	R2	—		Mel	21	Nando Yosu
1994–95	2ªB	38	11	13	14	50	56	35	13th	R2	—		Mel	12	José Antonio Barrios José María Pellejero José Víctor Rodríguez
1995–96	2ªB	38	21	8	9	55	32	71	2nd		—		Oti	15	Rafael Alcaide "Crispi" Lucas Alcaraz
1996–97	2ªB	38	15	13	10	51	34	58	6th	R3	—		Manolo	11	Lucas Alcaraz
1997–98	2ªB	38	16	13	9	42	27	61	4th		—		Manolo	16	Lucas Alcaraz Aguirre Suárez Juan José Enríquez
1998–99	2ªB	38	17	13	8	51	35	64	6th	R1	—		Rubén Blaya Sergio Cruz Puche	8	Paco Chaparro
1999–2000	2ªB	38	21	10	7	54	28	73	1st		—		Ismael	14	Paco Chaparro Felipe Mesones
2000–01	2ªB	36	13	12	11	44	40	51	5th	QF	—		Huegún	13	Ismael Díaz Manuel Torres Molina "Lalo" José Ángel Moreno
2001–02	2ªB	38	14	8	16	40	45	50	10th	PR	—		Dezzotti	14	Manuel Ángel Muñiz Ramón Blanco
2002–03	3ª	38	20	10	8	51	35	70	4th		—		Francis	14	José Parejo José María Rodríguez
2003–04	3ª	40	22	12	6	63	27	78	1st		—		Rubén Cortés Garrido	14	José María Rodríguez
2004–05	3ª	38	22	7	9	69	35	73	5th	R1	—		Vinuesa	17	Gerardo Castillo Antonio Ruiz "Maquiles" José Nicolás Álvarez Vico
2005–06	3ª	38	23	9	6	80	26	78	1st		—		Josemi	16	Juan José "Kiki" Barón José Víctor Rodríguez
2006–07	2ªB	38	14	9	15	39	36	51	13th	R1	—		Bordi Josemi	10	Josip Višnjić José Víctor Rodríguez
2007–08	2ªB	38	16	15	7	52	36	63	5th		—		Gorka Pintado	18	Óscar Cano
2008–09	2ªB	38	13	12	13	53	52	51	10th	R1	—		Altuna	12	Óscar Cano Juan Carlos Morán Pedro Braojos
2009–10	2ªB	38	23	7	8	74	37	76	1st		—		Tariq	19	Miguel Ángel Álvarez Tomé Fabriciano González "Fabri"
2010–11	2ª	42	18	14	10	71	47	68	5th	R3	—		Geijo	24	Fabriciano González "Fabri"
2011–12	La Liga	38	12	6	20	35	56	42	17th	R32	—		Ighalo Siqueira	6	Fabriciano González "Fabri" Abel Resino
2012–13	La Liga	38	11	9	18	37	54	42	15th	R32	—		El-Arabi	7	Anquela Lucas Alcaraz
2013–14	La Liga	38	12	5	21	32	57	41	15th	R32	—		El-Arabi	12	Lucas Alcaraz
2014–15	La Liga	38	7	14	17	29	64	35	17th	R16	—		El-Arabi	7	Joaquín Caparrós Abel Resino José Ramón Sandoval
2015–16	La Liga	38	10	9	19	46	69	39	16th	R16	—		El-Arabi	17	José Ramón Sandoval José González
2016–17	La Liga	38	4	8	26	30	82	20	20th	R32	—		Carcela Kravets Pereira	5	Paco Jémez Lucas Alcaraz Tony Adams
2017–18	2ª	42	17	10	15	55	50	61	10th	R2	—		Machís	14	José Luis Oltra Pedro Morilla Pineda Miguel Ángel Portugal
2018–19	2ª	42	22	13	7	52	28	79	2nd	R2	—		Puertas	11	Diego Martínez
2019–20	La Liga	38	16	8	14	52	45	56	7th	SF	—		Fernández	11	Diego Martínez
2020–21	La Liga	38	13	7	18	47	65	46	9th	QF	UEFA Europa League	QF	Soldado	9	Diego Martínez
2021–22	La Liga	38	8	14	16	44	61	38	18th	R2	—		Molina	10	Robert Moreno Rubén Torrecilla Aitor Karanka
2022–23	2ª	42	22	9	11	55	30	75	1st	R2	—		Uzuni	23	Aitor Karanka Paco López
2023–24	La Liga	38	4	9	25	38	79	21	20th	R1	—		Uzuni	11	Paco López Alexander Medina José Ramón Sandoval
2024–25	2ª	42	18	11	13	65	54	65	7th	R32	—		Uzuni	14	Guille Abascal Fran Escribá Pacheta

1 Only league goals included
