= Gimnástico FC =

- Full name: Gimnástico Football Club
- Founded: 1909
- Dissolved: 1939 (Merged with Levante FC to form Levante UD)
- Ground: Estadio Vallejo, Valencia, Spain
- Capacity: ¿?
Home colours

Gimnástico Fútbol Club was a football club based in Valencia, Spain. In 1939, the team united with Levante FC to become Union Deportiva Levante-Gimnástico. With current name of Levante Union Deportiva, the resulting team is considered the most senior football club in Valencia. from both teams that formed its sports union: Levante Football Club and Gimnástico Football Club. As a matter of fact, Levante UD took their nickname, the Frogs, "Granota" in Valencian, from their Gimnástic FC heritage.

== History ==
Gimnástico F.C. was founded in 1909. In 1939 Levante FC and Gimnástico united to become current team Levante UD.

In 1980, a club called Gimnástico CF was founded to bring back the history of Gimnástico. In 2002, the club was sold to Valencia CF and became their C-team, before being dissolved in 2004. Gimnástico returned to an independent status in 2003, but as a football school, after incorporating Tiris CF; the club was later incorporated into CD Malilla's structure in 2006.

=== Background ===
Levante FC - (1909–1939) → ↓

UD Levante-Gimnástico (renamed Levante UD) - (1939–Present)

Gimnástico FC - (1909–1939) → ↑

== Seasons ==
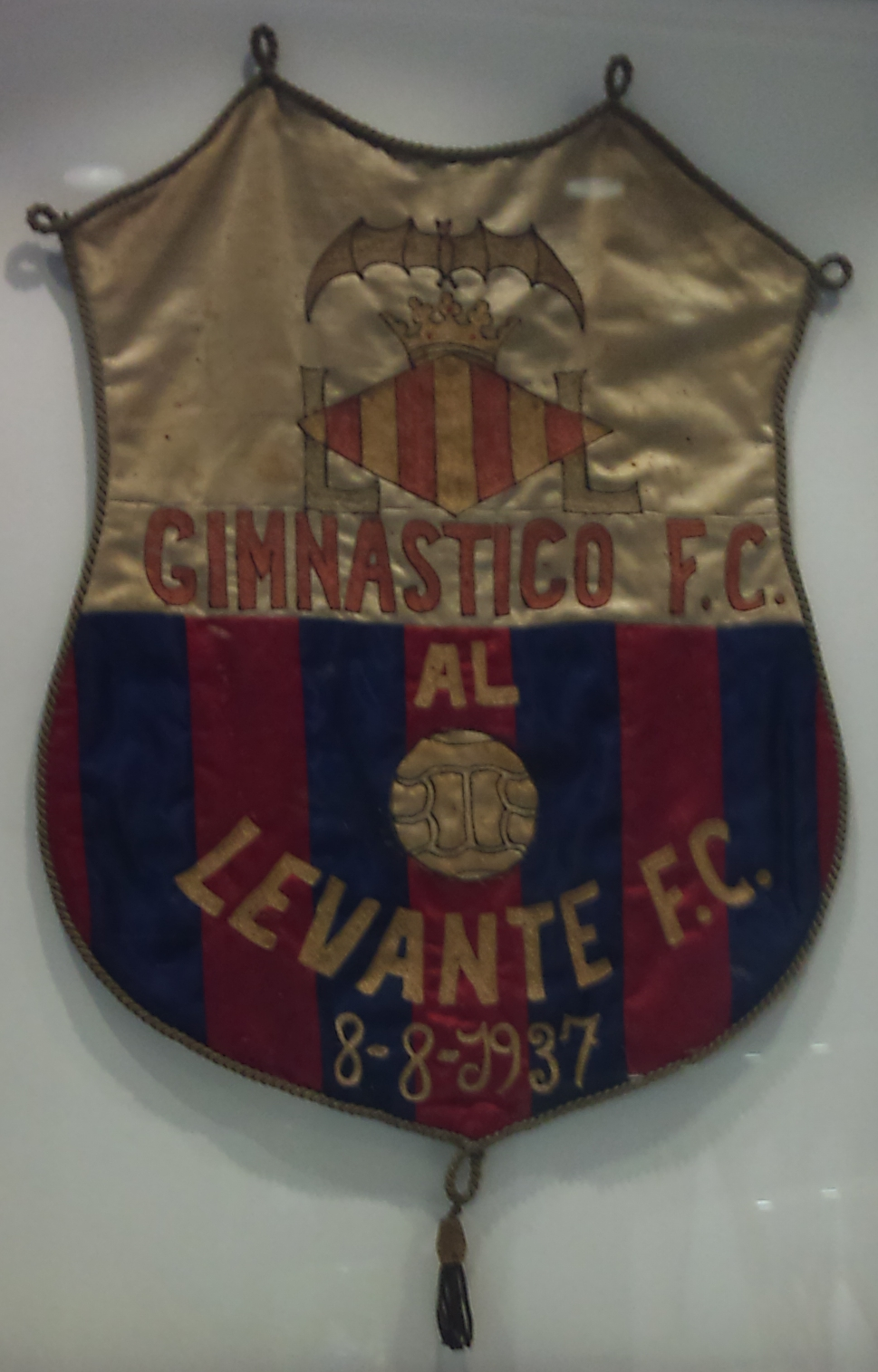

Season	Tier	Division	Place	Copa del Rey
1918–19	—	Regional	1st	
1919–20	—	Regional	2nd	
1920–21	—	Regional	1st	
1921–22	—	Regional	2nd	
1922–23	—	Regional	2nd	
1923–24	—	Regional	1st	
1924–25	—	Regional	2nd	
1925–26	—	Regional	3rd	
1926–27	—	Regional	4th	
1927–28	—	Regional	4th	

Season	Tier	Division	Place	Copa del Rey
1928–29	—	Regional	3rd	
1929–30	3	3ª	3rd	
1930–31	3	3ª	5th	
1931–32	3	3ª	3rd	
1932–33	3	3ª	3rd	
1933–34	3	3ª	3rd	
1934–35	2	2ª	6th	5th round
1935–36	2	2ª	4th	group round
1936–37	4	Regional	6th	

- 2 seasons in Segunda División
- 5 seasons in Tercera División
- 12 seasons in Regional League
