= Levante FC =

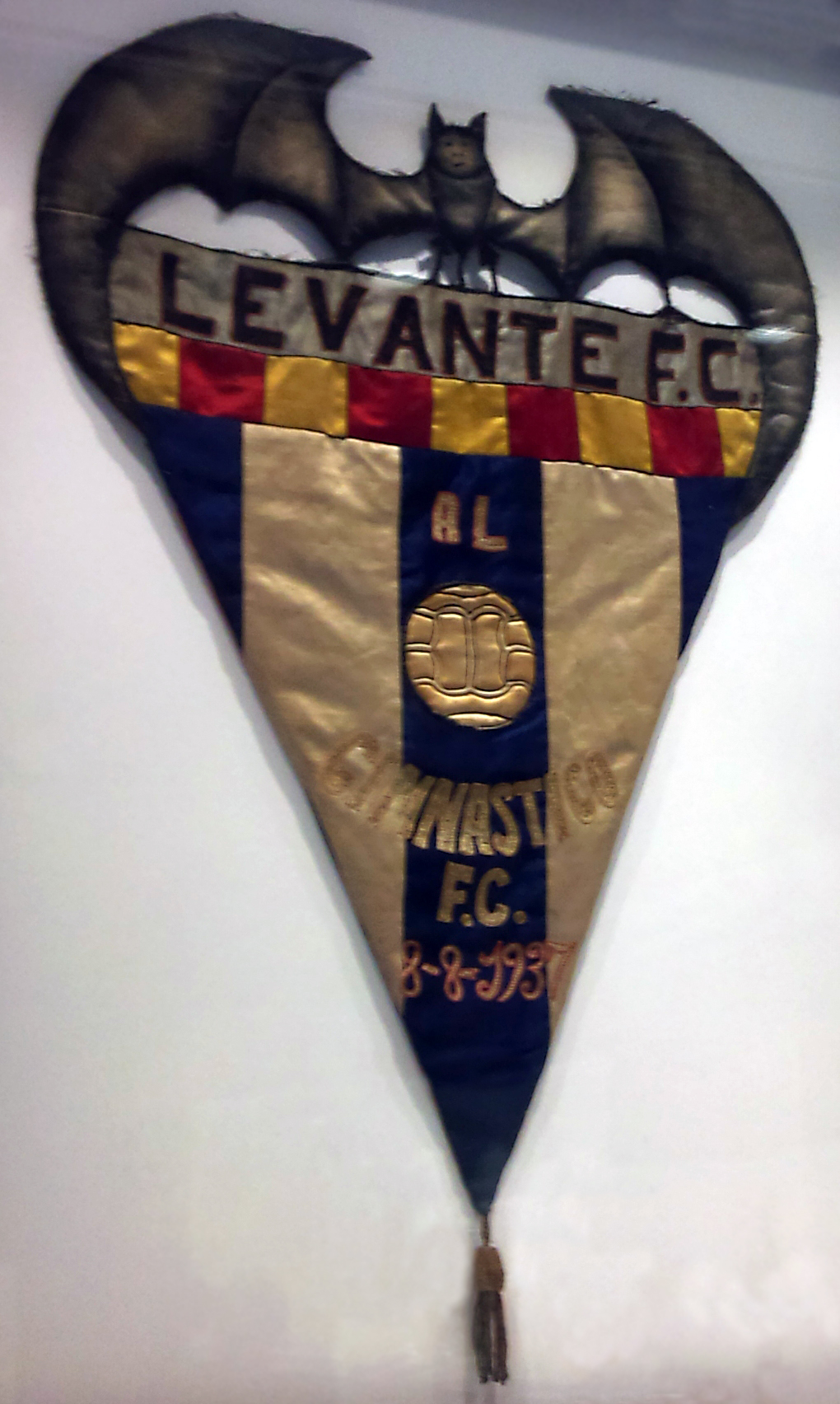
- Full name: Levante Football Club
- Nickname: Llevant
- Founded: 1909
- Dissolved: 1939; 87 years ago (merged with Gimnástico FC to form Levante UD)
- Ground: Estadio La Cruz
- Capacity: 11,500
Home colours

Levante Football Club was a football club in Valencia, Spain. It was a predecessor of the current Levante UD.

== History ==
The club was founded in 1909 as "Levante Football Club". In 1939 Levante FC and Gimnástico FC merged into "Levante Unión Deportiva". Levante UD thus having origin since, at least, 1909 from both merged teams, Levante FC and Gimnástico FC. Today, Levante UD is the oldest senior football club in Valencia. Local rival Valencia CF was not formed until 1919.

=== Background ===
Levante FC – (1909–1939) → ↓

Levante FC – Gimnástico FC, renamed Levante Unión Deportiva – (1939–Present)

Gimnástico FC – (1909–1939) → ↑

=== Copa de la España Libre ===
During the Spanish Civil War both Levante FC and Gimnástico CF played in the Mediterranean League, finishing fifth and sixth respectively. Teams from this league also competed in the Copa de la España Libre (Free Spain Cup). It was originally intended that the top four teams from the league would enter the cup, but FC Barcelona opted to tour Mexico and the United States. As a result, Levante FC took their place. The first round of the competition was a mini-league with the top two teams, Levante FC and Valencia CF, then qualifying for the final. On 18 July 1937, Levante FC beat their city rivals 1–0 at the Montjuïc.

== Season to season ==
Season	Tier	Division	Place	Copa del Rey
1909–10	1	Regional	4th	-
1910–1918		No Record		-
1918–19	DNP			-
1919–20	1	Regional	3rd	-
1920–21	1	Regional	4th	-
1921–22	1	Regional	4th	-
1922–23	1	Regional	4th	-
1923–24	1	Regional	3rd	-
1924–25	1	Regional	3rd	-
1925–26	1	Regional	2nd	group round
1926–27	1	Regional	3rd	-

Season	Tier	Division	Place	Copa del Rey
1927–28	1	Regional	1st	group round
1928–29	4	Regional	4th	-
1929–30	3	3ª	2nd	-
1930–31	3	3ª	6th	-
1931–32	3	3ª	1st	-
1932–33	3	3ª	4th	Round of 32
1933–34	3	3ª	5th	Round of 32
1934–35	2	2ª	3rd	Semi-finals
1935–36	2	2ª	3rd	2nd round
1937	1	ML	5th	Winner

- 2 seasons in Segunda División
- 5 seasons in Tercera División

== Honours ==
- Copa del Rey
  - Winners (1): 1937
  - Semi-finals (1): 1935
