= 1933 Copa del Presidente de la República =

33rd Copa del Rey

Tournament details
- Country: Spain
- Teams: 32

Final positions
- Champions: Athletic Bilbao (13th title)
- Runners-up: Madrid

Tournament statistics
- Matches played: 62
- Goals scored: 274 (4.42 per match)

The Copa del Presidente de la República 1933 (President of the Republic's Cup) was the 33rd staging of the Copa del Rey, the Spanish football cup competition.

The competition started on April 9, 1933, and concluded on June 25, 1933, with the final, held at the Montjuïc Stadium in Barcelona. Athletic Bilbao won their 13th title, the fourth in a row.

== Teams ==
As in the previous tournaments, the teams qualified through the Regional Championships:

- Asturias Region (3): Oviedo FC, Sporting de Gijón, Club Gijón
- Balearic Islands Region (1): CD Constancia
- Canary Islands Region (1): Real Club Victoria
- Cantabria Region (2): Racing de Santander, Gimnástica de Torrelavega
- Catalonia Region (3): FC Barcelona, CD Español, Palafrugell FC
- Galicia Region (3): Club Celta, Deportivo La Coruña, Racing Ferrol
- Gipuzkoa–Navarre–Aragon Region (5): Unión Club, Donostia FC, CD Logroño, CA Osasuna, Zaragoza FC
- Murcia Region (2): Murcia FC, Hércules FC
- Center–South Region (5): Madrid FC, Athletic Madrid, Valladolid Deportivo, Sevilla FC, Betis Balompié
- West Region (1): Club Recreativo Onuba
- Levante Region (3): Valencia FC, CD Castellón, Levante FC
- Biscay Region (3): Athletic Bilbao, Baracaldo FC, Arenas Club

== Round of 32 ==
The first leg was played on April 9. The second leg was played on April 16.

Team 1	Agg.	Team 2	1st leg	2nd leg
Madrid FC	5–2	Racing Santander	4–1	1–1
Donostia FC	4–6	Sporting de Gijón	2–2	2–4
Valladolid Deportivo	2–8	Valencia FC	2–2	0–6
Arenas Club	3–7	Athletic Bilbao	2–2	1–5
FC Barcelona	2–4	Betis Balompié	2–0	0–4
Recreativo Onuba	3–8	Murcia FC	3–1	0–7
Gimnástica de Torrelavega	1–4	Palafrugell FC	1–1	0–3
Real Club Victoria	2–6	Athletic Madrid	2–2	0–4
Club Celta	3–4	Zaragoza FC	2–3	1–1
Club Gijón	1–6	CD Español	1–3	0–3
CD Logroño	3–7	Unión Club	1–2	2–5
CD Constancia	3–4	CD Castellón	1–1	2–3
Racing Ferrol	1–4	Hércules FC	1–1	0–3
Levante FC	4–7	Deportivo de La Coruña	3–0	1–7
Sevilla FC	7–4	Oviedo FC	4–1	3–3
Baracaldo FC	1–5	CA Osasuna	1–1	0–4

== Round of 16 ==
The first leg was played on May 7. The second leg was played on May 14.

Team 1	Agg.	Team 2	1st leg	2nd leg
Athletic Madrid	5–5	Valencia CF	3–4	2–1
Unión Club	0–11	Madrid FC	0–2	0–9
Sevilla FC	2–7	Athletic Bilbao	1–2	1–5
CA Osasuna	5–7	Deportivo de La Coruña	5–2	0–5
Sporting Gijón	7–3	CD Castellón	5–0	2–3
Zaragoza FC	3–5	CD Español	3–1	0–4
Hércules FC	4–7	Betis Balompié	3–3	1–4
Palafrugell FC	1–4	Murcia FC	1–0	0–4

- Tiebreaker

Team 1	Score	Team 2
Valencia FC	2–1 (Note: Played in Zaragoza on May 16.)	Athletic Madrid

== Quarter-finals ==
The first leg was played on May 28. The second leg was played on June 4.

Team 1	Agg.	Team 2	1st leg	2nd leg
Murcia FC	5–6	CD Español	5–3	0–3
Deportivo la Coruña	3–12	Athletic Bilbao	2–4	1–8
Madrid FC	13–0	Sporting Gijón	8–0	5–0
Betis Balompié	5–6	Valencia FC	4–2	1–4

== Semi-finals ==
The first leg was played on June 11. The second leg was played on two dates: CD Español-Athletic on June 16 and Valencia FC-Madrid FC on June 18.

Team 1	Agg.	Team 2	1st leg	2nd leg
Madrid FC	6–2	Valencia FC	3–1	3–1
Athletic Bilbao	3–1	CD Español	1–0	2–1

== Final ==
25 June 1933
17:00 CET

Athletic Bilbao	2–1	Madrid CF
Gorostiza 73'; Lafuente 75'		Lazcano 23'

Montjuïc, Barcelona
Attendance: 60,000
Referee: Jesús Arribas

Copa del Rey 1933 winners
Athletic Bilbao
13h title
