= SC de La Plana =

Association football team in Spain

La Plana
- Full name: Sport Club de La Plana
- Founded: 26 August 1933
- Dissolved: May 1936
- Ground: El Sequiol
- Capacity: 6,000
Home colours

Sport Club de La Plana was a professional Spanish football team based in Castellón de la Plana, in the Valencian Community. Founded on 26 August 1933, the club played one Segunda División season before being dissolved in May 1936.

== History ==
On 29 January 1933, Castellón faced Oviedo FC and lost 2–0. The supporters were discontent with the performance of referee Ostalé, and invaded the field to assault the referee, which led to a three-month sanction of the El Sequiol field and obliged Castellón to host home matches in another stadium. After being deemed to play at the Mestalla Stadium by the Valencian Football Federation, Castellón denied to play in that field and forfeit the following home matches, which ensured their relegation.

Expelled from all competitions, Castellón was dissolved on 16 August 1933, and different associates from their board founded Sport Club de La Plana ten days later. With a squad deemed too strong for the Segunda Regional, the club achieved immediate promotion to the Primera Regional, and qualified to Segunda División due to its expansion to three groups.

Immediately relegated after finishing last of their group, SC La Plana's low turnouts and high debts saw the club having a low quality squad, which finished sitxh and last in the Primera Regional. In May 1936, La Plana was dissolved, shortly after overseeing another club from the city, Athletic Club Castellón, gain more proeminence.

== Season to season ==
Season	Tier	Division	Place	Copa del Rey
1933–34	5	2ª Reg.	1st	
1934–35	2	2ª	8th	Third round
1935–36	4	1ª Reg.	6th	

- 1 season in Segunda División
