= Álvaro Santamaría =

Álvaro Santamaría may refer to:

- Álvaro Santamaría (footballer, born 1950), Colombian football forward
- Álvaro Santamaría (footballer, born 2001), Spanish football forward
