= Unión SC =

Spanish football club

Unión
- Full name: Unión Sporting Club
- Nickname: Los Corinthians
- Founded: 1922
- Dissolved: 1937
- Ground: Campo da Florida, Vigo, Galicia, Spain
- Capacity: 3,000

Unión Sporting Club Vigo was a Spanish football team based in Vigo, in the autonomous community of Galicia. Founded in 1922, the club was dissolved in 1937.

== History ==
Unión SC was founded in 1922, from a merge of Comercial Football Club and Victoria Sport Club. In the 1933–34 season, the club won the Tercera División, and disputed one campaign in Segunda División, finishing last in its group.

In 1937, Unión SC was disbanded, mainly due to the Spanish Civil War. The club did not return to an active status, but the club's board and players joined Football Club Vigués in 1939, acting mainly as Celta de Vigo's reserve team.

== Honours ==
- Galician Championship

Winners (1): 1934–35

== Seasons ==
Season	Tier	Division	Place	Copa del Rey
1932–33	3	3ª	2nd	
1933–34	3	3ª	1st	
1934–35	4	Serie A	4th	Third round
1935–36	2	2ª	8th	First round

- 1 season in Segunda División
- 2 seasons in Tercera División
