= 1936 Copa del Presidente de la República =

Tournament details
- Country: Spain
- Teams: 43

Final positions
- Champions: Madrid CF (7th title)
- Runners-up: Barcelona

Tournament statistics
- Matches played: 115

The Copa del Presidente de la República 1936 (President of the Republic's Cup) was the 36th staging of the Spanish football cup competition.

The competition started in February, 1936 and concluded on June 21, 1936, with the final, held at the Mestalla stadium in Valencia. Madrid CF won the match 2-1 for their seventh cup victory, defeating FC Barcelona in the first El Clásico final. Defending champions Sevilla FC lost to Hércules CF in a Round-of-16 replay.

It was the final season before the tournament was cancelled due to the Spanish Civil War, returning in 1939 as the Copa del Generalísimo.

== Teams ==
- Asturias–Galicia Region: Oviedo FC, Sporting de Gijón, Stadium Club Avilesino, Club Celta, Club Deportivo de La Coruña, Unión Sportiva Vigo, Club Lemos
- Balearic Islands Region: CD Mallorca
- Canary Islands Region: UD Tenerife
- Center–Aragón Region: Madrid CF, Athletic Club de Madrid, CD Nacional de Madrid, Valladolid Deportivo, Zaragoza FC, Racing Club de Santander, UD Salamanca (as winner of 1935–36 1ª Pref. Campeonato Regional)
- Catalonia Region: FC Barcelona, Gerona FC, CD Español, CD Sabadell FC, CD Júpiter, FC Badalona, Granollers CD
- Levante Region: Hércules FC, Murcia FC, Valencia FC, Levante FC, Gimnástico FC, Elche FC, Cartagena FC
- Northern Africa Region: Athletic Club de Tetuán
- Biscay Region: Arenas Club, Athletic Club de Bilbao, Baracaldo FC, Erandio FC, Donostia FC, Unión Club, CA Osasuna
- South Region: Sevilla FC, Betis Balompié, Xerez SC, CD Malacitano, Club Recreativo de Granada, Mirandilla FC, RCD Córdoba

== First round ==
=== Group 1 ===
Pos	Team	P	W	D	L	GF	GA	Pts
1.	CD La Coruña	4	3	1	0	10	4	7
2.	Club Lemos	4	1	1	2	5	6	3
3.	Unión SC	4	1	0	3	3	8	2

- Stadium Club Avilesino withdrew before the start of the tournament.

=== Group 2 ===
Pos	Team	P	W	D	L	GF	GA	Pts
1.	Sporting de Gijón	6	4	0	2	23	9	8
2.	Valladolid Deportivo	6	3	0	3	12	16	6
3.	CD Nacional	6	2	1	3	10	13	5
4.	UD Salamanca	6	2	1	3	6	13	5

=== Group 3 ===
Pos	Team	P	W	D	L	GF	GA	Pts
1.	Baracaldo FC	6	3	1	2	14	8	7
2.	Erandio FC	6	3	1	2	8	8	7
3.	Donostia FC	6	3	0	3	8	10	6
4.	Unión Club	6	1	2	3	6	10	4

=== Group 4 ===
Pos	Team	P	W	D	L	GF	GA	Pts
1.	CD Sabadell FC	6	4	1	1	10	2	9
2.	CD Júpiter	6	3	1	2	13	11	7
3.	FC Badalona	6	2	0	4	6	8	4
4.	Granollers CD	6	1	2	3	8	16	4

=== Group 5 ===
Pos	Team	P	W	D	L	GF	GA	Pts
1.	Levante FC	4	3	0	1	14	2	6
2.	Gimnástico FC	4	1	2	1	2	7	4
3.	Cartagena FC	4	0	2	2	3	10	2

- Elche FC was disqualified

=== Group 6 ===
Pos	Team	P	W	D	L	GF	GA	Pts
1.	CD Malacitano	6	4	0	2	19	7	8
2.	Mirandilla FC	6	3	1	2	11	10	7
3.	Recreativo Granada	6	3	0	3	9	7	6
4.	RCD Córdoba	6	1	1	4	5	20	3

=== Group 7 ===
Pos	Team	P	W	D	L	GF	GA	Pts
1.	Athletic Club Tetuán	2	2	0	0	3	1	6
2.	Unión de Tenerife	2	0	0	2	1	3	4

== Second round ==
Team 1	Agg.	Team 2	1st leg	2nd leg
CD La Coruña	5–5	Sporting Gijón	5–1	0–4
Levante FC	0–1	Baracaldo FC	0–1	(Note: Both teams decided to play only one leg.)
CD Mallorca	3–5	CD Sabadell	2–1	1–4
Athletic Tetuán	2–5	CD Malacitano	2–2	0–3

Source: RSSSF

- Tiebreaker

Team 1	Score	Team 2
Sporting Gijón	2–0	CD La Coruña

== Third round ==
Team 1	Agg.	Team 2	1st leg	2nd leg
Baracaldo FC	3–4	Sporting Gijón	3–2	0–2
CD Sabadell	3–2	CD Malacitano	2–1	1–1

Source: RSSSF

== Fourth round ==
Team 1	Agg.	Team 2	1st leg	2nd leg
Sporting Gijón	8–3	Athletic Madrid	5–1	3–2
CD Español	4–4	Valencia FC	1–0	3–4
Betis Balompié	4–1	CD Sabadell	3–0	1–1
CA Osasuna	7–1	Racing Santander	5–1	2–0

Source: RSSSF

- Tiebreaker

Team 1	Score	Team 2
CD Español	3–2	Valencia CF

== Round of 16 ==
Team 1	Agg.	Team 2	1st leg	2nd leg
Madrid CF	3–3	Arenas Club	2–1	1–2
Athletic Bilbao	7–4	Club Celta	6–0	1–4
Sporting Gijón	0–4	FC Barcelona	0–0	0–4
CD Español	6–3	Xerez SC	3–0	3–3
Sevilla FC	5–5	Hércules FC	3–1	2–4
Murcia FC	2–3	Zaragoza FC	2–0	0–3
CA Osasuna	9–6	Oviedo FC	5–1	4–5
Gerona FC	3–5	Betis Balompié	1–2	2–3

Source: RSSSF

- Tiebreaker

Team 1	Score	Team 2
Madrid CF	6–1	Arenas Club
Hércules FC	2–0	Sevilla FC

== Quarter-finals ==
Team 1	Agg.	Team 2	1st leg	2nd leg
Madrid CF	3–1	Athletic Bilbao	2–1	1–0
CD Español	2–4	FC Barcelona	2–1	0–3
Zaragoza FC	1–4	Hércules FC	1–1	0–3
Betis Balompié	1–3	CA Osasuna	0–0	1–3

Source: RSSSF

== Semi-finals ==
Team 1	Agg.	Team 2	1st leg	2nd leg
Madrid CF	8–2	Hércules FC	7–0	1–2
CA Osasuna	5–9	FC Barcelona	4–2	1–7

Source: RSSSF

== Final ==
Team 1	Score	Team 2
Madrid CF	2–1	FC Barcelona

Source: RSSSF

Copa de la República 1936 Winners
Madrid CF
7th title
