= CD Logroño =

Spanish football team

Logroño
- Full name: Club Deportivo Logroño
- Founded: 1922
- Dissolved: 1935
- Ground: Las Gaunas, Logroño, Spain
- Capacity: 8,000
Home colours	Away colours

Club Deportivo Logroño was a Spanish football team based in Logroño, Spain.

== Season to season ==
Season	Tier	Division	Place	Copa del Rey
1929–30	3	3ª	3rd	
1930–31	3	3ª	2nd	
1931–32	3	3ª	4th	
1932–33	3	3ª	1st	Round of 32
1933–34	3	3ª	3rd	Round of 32
1934–35	2	2ª	8th	

- 1 season in Segunda División
- 5 seasons in Tercera División

== Honours ==
- Regional Championships:
  - Campeonato Mancomunado de Guipúzcoa: 1931–32
  - Campeonato Mancomunado de Guipúzcoa-Navarra-Aragón y Rioja: 1933–34
- National competitions:
  - Tercera División: 1932–33
