= 1932–33 Tercera División =

Tercera División
- Season: 1932–33
- Promoted: Sabadell
- Matches played: 102
- Goals scored: 414 (4.06 per match)
- Biggest home win: Zaragoza 15–1 Huesca (18 December 1932)
- Biggest away win: Martinenc 0–4 Badalona (11 December 1932); Levante 0–4 Hércules (22 January 1933)
- Highest scoring: Zaragoza 15–1 Huesca (18 December 1932)

== League tables ==
=== Group I ===
Pos	Team	Pld	W	D	L	GF	GA	GD	Pts
1	Stadium Avilesino	6	4	0	2	13	9	+4	8
2	Unión Sporting	6	4	0	2	14	12	+2	8
3	Eiriña	6	2	0	4	11	12	−1	4
4	Racing de Ferrol	6	2	0	4	6	11	−5	4

=== Group II ===
Pos	Team	Pld	W	D	L	GF	GA	GD	Pts
1	Valladolid	6	5	0	1	21	6	+15	10
2	Nacional de Madrid	6	5	0	1	16	9	+7	10
3	Castilla	6	2	0	4	10	22	−12	4
4	Ferroviaria	6	0	0	6	7	17	−10	0

=== Group III ===
Pos	Team	Pld	W	D	L	GF	GA	GD	Pts
1	Logroño	6	3	2	1	15	7	+8	8
2	Barakaldo	6	2	2	2	12	9	+3	6
3	Erandio	6	3	0	3	8	8	0	6
4	Tolosa	6	1	2	3	5	16	−11	4

=== Group IV ===
Pos	Team	Pld	W	D	L	GF	GA	GD	Pts
1	Zaragoza	4	4	0	0	29	5	+24	8
2	Huesca	4	1	0	3	9	24	−15	2
3	Alkartasuna	4	1	0	3	7	16	−9	2
4	Atlético Aurora (Note: Team withdrawn from the competition)	0	0	0	0	0	0	0	0

=== Group V ===
Pos	Team	Pld	W	D	L	GF	GA	GD	Pts
1	Badalona	10	7	1	2	24	12	+12	15
2	Sabadell	10	4	4	2	25	16	+9	12
3	Palafrugell	10	5	1	4	19	20	−1	11
4	Sants	10	3	4	3	11	13	−2	10
5	Júpiter	10	2	2	6	9	15	−6	6
6	Martinenc	10	2	2	6	13	25	−12	6

=== Group VI ===
Pos	Team	Pld	W	D	L	GF	GA	GD	Pts
1	Hércules	6	5	1	0	26	7	+19	11
2	Elche	6	2	1	3	15	12	+3	5
3	Gimnástico	6	2	1	3	10	21	−11	5
4	Levante	6	1	1	4	9	20	−11	3

=== Group VII ===
Pos	Team	Pld	W	D	L	GF	GA	GD	Pts
1	Cartagena	6	4	1	1	19	3	+16	9
2	Cieza	6	4	0	2	14	11	+3	8
3	Gimnástico Abad	6	2	0	4	9	14	−5	4
4	Imperial	6	1	1	4	10	24	−14	3

=== Group VIII ===
Pos	Team	Pld	W	D	L	GF	GA	GD	Pts
1	Malagueño	4	2	1	1	6	2	+4	5
2	Racing Córdoba	4	2	1	1	8	7	+1	5
3	Málaga Sport	4	0	2	2	4	9	−5	2

== Promotion playoff ==
=== First round ===
Team 1	Agg.	Team 2	1st leg	2nd leg
Stadium Avilesino	3–3	Nacional Madrid	2–0	1–3
Logroño	12–2	Huesca	9–1	3–1
Badalona	3–4	Elche	3–0	0–4
Cartagena	4–1	Racing Córdoba	4–0	0–1
Unión Sporting	0–6	Valladolid	0–2	0–4
Barakaldo	2–5	Zaragoza	2–1	0–4
Hércules	3–3	Sabadell	3–1	0–2
Malagueño	4–3	Cieza	4–0	0–3

==== Tiebreakers ====
Team 1	Score	Team 2
Stadium Avilesino	4–0	Nacional de Madrid
Hércules	0–3	Sabadell

=== Second round ===
Team 1	Agg.	Team 2	1st leg	2nd leg
Valladolid	4–3	Stadium Avilesino	3–1	1–2
Elche	5–5	Sabadell	5–2	0–3
Logroño	0–2	Zaragoza	0–0	0–2
Cartagena	4–3	Malagueño	4–0	0–3

==== Tiebreaker ====
Team 1	Score	Team 2
Elche	1–2	Sabadell

=== Third round ===
Team 1	Agg.	Team 2	1st leg	2nd leg
Zaragoza	2–1	Valladolid	1–0	1–1
Sabadell	10–3	Cartagena	8–2	2–1

=== Final Round ===
Team 1	Agg.	Team 2	1st leg	2nd leg
Sabadell	3–2	Zaragoza	1–1	2–1
