= Álvaro Santamaría (footballer, born 2001) =

Spanish footballer

Personal information
- Full name: Álvaro Santamaría Arenas
- Date of birth: 7 November 2001 (age 25)
- Place of birth: Gijón, Spain
- Height: 1.83 m (6 ft 0 in)
- Position: Forward

Team information
- Current team: Avilés Industrial
- Number: 9

Youth career
- Colegio Inmaculada
- 2019–2020: Sporting Gijón

Senior career*
Years	Team	Apps	(Gls)
2019–2023	Sporting B	85	(29)
2021–2022	Sporting Gijón	1	(0)
2023–2024	Racing B	34	(12)
2023–2024	Racing Santander	1	(0)
2024–	Avilés Industrial	58	(19)
- * Club domestic league appearances and goals as of 9 June 2026

Álvaro Santamaría Arenas (born 7 November 2001) is a Spanish professional footballer who plays as a forward for Avilés Industrial.

== Club career ==
Born in Gijón, Asturias, Santamaría joined Sporting de Gijón's Mareo in 2019, from Fútbol Colegio Inmaculada de Gijón. He made his senior debut with the reserves on 21 December of that year, coming on as a second-half substitute for Gaspar Campos in a 1–1 Segunda División B away draw against UP Langreo.

On 15 July 2020, after finishing his formation, Santamaría extended his contract with the club and was definitely promoted to the B-side. He scored his first senior goal on 17 October, netting his team's second in a 2–4 home loss against Cultural y Deportiva Leonesa.

Santamaría made his first-team debut on 12 November 2021, replacing Christian Rivera in a 0–1 home loss against Real Sociedad B in the Segunda División. On 1 June 2023, after just another first team match for Sporting, he moved to another reserve team, Rayo Cantabria in Segunda Federación.

== Personal life ==
Santamaría's relative Eugenio was also a footballer and a forward. He notably represented amateur sides before playing one single match for Sporting in 1952.
