= Real Avilés Industrial CF =

Association football club in Spain

Avilés Industrial
- Full name: Real Avilés Industrial Club de Fútbol
- Nicknames: Realavilesinos; Blanquiazules
- Founded: 1903; 123 years ago
- Stadium: Estadio Román Suárez Puerta
- Capacity: 5,400
- Owner: Terrenos E Inmuebles S.L.
- President: Diego Baeza
- Head coach: Yago Iglesias
- League: Primera Federación – Group 1
- 2025–26: Primera Federación – Group 1, 14th of 20
- Website: www.realavilesindustrial1903.com
Home colours	Away colours

Real Avilés Industrial Club de Fútbol is a Spanish football team based in Avilés, in the autonomous community of Asturias. Founded in 1903 it plays in Primera Federación – Group 1, holding home matches at Estadio Román Suárez Puerta, with an approximate capacity of 5,400 seats.

== History ==
=== First years ===
Avilés was founded in 1903 under the name Sport Club Avilesino, hence being considered the oldest football club in Asturias. In 1906 he joins the Sociedad Obrera Industrial as their football section with the name of Círculo Industrial y de Sport de Avilés, but a few years later, the players and managers of the football team decide to become independent again, this time with the name of Stadium Club Avilesino.

In 1925 Stadium obtained the royal crown from Alfonso XIII, being renamed Real Stadium Club Avilesino. A new name change took place in 1940, according to a government's prohibition of foreign names, and the club became Real Avilés Club de Fútbol.

=== Last decades ===
In 1983 Avilés absorbed Club Deportivo Ensidesa and changed its name again, to Real Avilés Industrial Club de Fútbol. It played in Segunda División B (the third highest level of the league pyramid) for two seasons and returned to that level at the end of the 1987–88 campaign, being crowned champions three years later and thus promoting to Segunda División: after comfortably finishing in midtable in its first season, the team ranked second from bottom in the following, spending a further eight years in the third category then two more from 2002 to 2004, after which it returned to Tercera División (the fourth highest level).

The relegation to Tercera was followed by a serious financial and social crisis in the club, with almost all the supporters leaving the club. In 2010, the board of the club retook its old name Real Avilés Club de Fútbol.

Following an agreement with the investment group "Golplus", Real Avilés failed to promote to Segunda División B in 2012, but the club could buy a vacant berth in the third tier. Two years later, Real Avilés would play the promotion play-offs to Segunda División. They would eliminate FC Cartagena in the first round, but failed in the attempt to beat UE Llagostera in the second one. In October 2014, Golplus would leave the club due to the lack of support and Real Avilés would start a new crisis that ended with the relegation to Tercera División after being beaten in the relegation playoffs by CD Eldense.

On 3 July 2017, the Royal Spanish Football Federation would not allow Real Avilés to register its players in any of the categories due to an unpaid debt of €32,000 to their players. After paying it, the club continued involved in serious internal problems as José María Tejero, owner of the club, and the management group did not reach an agreement. Tejero decided to take the helm of the club despite the opposition of the management group, and without terminating the contract; this action started when during the preseason of the 2017–18 Tercera División, Tejero called private security for not allowing the coaches and the players, contracted by the management group, to train in the municipal facilities.

After this incident, the owner and the management group made a different team each one for playing in the 2017–18 Tercera División. Both hired one coach and signed several players, but finally only the ones contracted by the owner were finally registered.

On 7 July 2023, Avilés announced a change of name to Real Avilés Industrial CF for the upcoming season.

== Club crest ==
The club changed the crest to the most recent one in 2017. The historical logo that was introduced in 1983, adding garnet colour, the colour of Ensidesa to the crest. However, in circa 2015 the club dropped the colour and restored to the old design. The club also deleted other elements that refer to Ensidesa from the club song.

Before 1983 the club also used a few other designs.

the logo of the club from circa 2015 to 2017 and in 1983

the logo of the club from circa 2011 to 2015

the logo of the club from circa 2017 to 2021

== Names ==
- Sport Club Avilesino (1903–1906)
- Círculo Industrial y de Sport de Avilés (1906–1915)
- Stadium Club Avilesino (1915–1925)
- Real Stadium Club Avilesino (1925–1931)
- Stadium Club Avilesino (1931–1940)
- Real Avilés Club de Fútbol (1940–1983)
- Real Avilés Industrial Club de Fútbol (1983–1992)
- Real Avilés Industrial Club de Fútbol, SAD (1992–2010)
- Real Avilés Club de Fútbol, SAD (2010–2023)
- Real Avilés Industrial Club de Fútbol, SAD (2023–)

== Season to season ==
Season	Tier	Division	Place	Copa del Rey
1929–30	3	3ª	2nd	
1930–31	3	3ª	8th	
1931–32	3	3ª	3rd	
1932–33	3	3ª	1st	
1933–34	3	3ª	4th	
1934–35	2	2ª	4th	Third round
1935–36	2	2ª	5th	First round
1939–40	2	2ª	7th	
1940–41	2	2ª	12th	First round
1941–42	3	1ª Reg.	5th	
1942–43	3	1ª Reg.	3rd	
1943–44	3	3ª	3rd	First round
1944–45	3	3ª	1st	
1945–46	3	3ª	5th	
1946–47	3	3ª	6th	
1947–48	3	3ª	6th	Third round
1948–49	3	3ª	5th	Fourth round
1949–50	3	3ª	2nd	
1950–51	3	3ª	10th	
1951–52	3	3ª	1st	

Season	Tier	Division	Place	Copa del Rey
1952–53	2	2ª	3rd	Third round
1953–54	2	2ª	11th	
1954–55	2	2ª	15th	
1955–56	3	3ª	2nd	
1956–57	2	2ª	7th	
1957–58	2	2ª	10th	
1958–59	2	2ª	11th	First round
1959–60	2	2ª	15th	First round
1960–61	3	3ª	2nd	
1961–62	3	3ª	2nd	
1962–63	3	3ª	3rd	
1963–64	3	3ª	2nd	
1964–65	3	3ª	1st	
1965–66	3	3ª	2nd	
1966–67	3	3ª	1st	
1967–68	3	3ª	1st	
1968–69	3	3ª	3rd	
1969–70	3	3ª	6th	First round
1970–71	3	3ª	7th	First round
1971–72	3	3ª	8th	Third round

Season	Tier	Division	Place	Copa del Rey
1972–73	3	3ª	13th	
1973–74	3	3ª	14th	First round
1974–75	4	Reg. Pref.	8th	
1975–76	4	Reg. Pref.	2nd	
1976–77	4	Reg. Pref.	2nd	
1977–78	4	3ª	7th	First round
1978–79	4	3ª	2nd	
1979–80	4	3ª	2nd	Second round
1980–81	4	3ª	9th	First round
1981–82	4	3ª	8th	
1982–83	4	3ª	13th	
1983–84	3	2ª B	16th	First round
1984–85	3	2ª B	19th	
1985–86	4	3ª	3rd	
1986–87	4	3ª	2nd	First round
1987–88	3	2ª B	2nd	Third round
1988–89	3	2ª B	4th	First round
1989–90	3	2ª B	1st	
1990–91	2	2ª	9th	Third round
1991–92	2	2ª	19th	Fifth round

Season	Tier	Division	Place	Copa del Rey
1992–93	3	2ª B	6th	Third round
1993–94	3	2ª B	15th	Third round
1994–95	3	2ª B	10th	First round
1995–96	3	2ª B	3rd	
1996–97	3	2ª B	10th	Second round
1997–98	3	2ª B	16th	
1998–99	3	2ª B	9th	
1999–2000	3	2ª B	16th	
2000–01	4	3ª	7th	
2001–02	4	3ª	2nd	
2002–03	3	2ª B	13th	
2003–04	3	2ª B	20th	
2004–05	4	3ª	6th	
2005–06	4	3ª	8th	
2006–07	4	3ª	6th	
2007–08	4	3ª	11th	
2008–09	4	3ª	11th	
2009–10	4	3ª	9th	
2010–11	4	3ª	10th	
2011–12	4	3ª	2nd	

Season	Tier	Division	Place	Copa del Rey
2012–13	3	2ª B	14th	
2013–14	3	2ª B	3rd	
2014–15	3	2ª B	16th	Second round
2015–16	4	3ª	3rd	
2016–17	4	3ª	2nd	
2017–18	4	3ª	17th	First round
2018–19	4	3ª	14th	
2019–20	4	3ª	16th	
2020–21	4	3ª	2nd / 5th	
2021–22	4	2ª RFEF	9th	
2022–23	4	2ª Fed.	2nd	
2023–24	4	2ª Fed.	13th	First round
2024–25	4	2ª Fed.	3rd	
2025–26	3	1ª Fed.	14th	First round
2026–27	3	1ª Fed.		

- 13 seasons in Segunda División
- 2 seasons in Primera Federación
- 18 seasons in Segunda División B
- 4 seasons in Segunda Federación/Segunda División RFEF
- 53 seasons in Tercera División (29 on 3rd tier)

== Players ==
=== Current squad ===
As of 4 November 2026

Note: Flags indicate national team as defined under FIFA eligibility rules; some limited exceptions apply. Players may hold more than one non-FIFA nationality.

No.	Pos.	Nation	Player
1	GK	ESP	Álvaro Ratón
2	FW	ESP	Julián Mahicas
3	DF	ESP	Roger Escoruela
4	DF	ESP	Markel Aketxe
5	MF	ESP	Samu Mayo
6	MF	ESP	Pitu Doncel
7	FW	ESP	Cris Montes
8	MF	ESP	Brais Abelenda
9	FW	ESP	Álvaro Santamaría
10	MF	ESP	Álex Neskes
11	FW	ESP	Íñigo Muñoz
13	GK	ESP	Marco Suárez

No.	Pos.	Nation	Player
14	FW	ESP	Berto Cayarga
15	DF	ESP	Iker Aldai
17	MF	ESP	Mangel Prendes
18	DF	ESP	Yago Rodríguez
19	FW	ESP	Natalio Lorenzo
20	DF	ESP	Osky Menéndez
21	DF	ESP	Jon Sillero
22	MF	ESP	Isi Gómez
23	DF	ESP	Andrés Carmona
24	FW	ESP	Santi Franco
27	FW	ESP	Dani Lidueña (on loan from Córdoba)

=== Reserve team ===
Note: Flags indicate national team as defined under FIFA eligibility rules; some limited exceptions apply. Players may hold more than one non-FIFA nationality.

No.	Pos.	Nation	Player
26	DF	ESP	Romeo Palicio
28	MF	ESP	Pelayo Cuesta

No.	Pos.	Nation	Player
29	FW	ESP	Dani Frechilla
30	FW	ESP	Kike Meaurio

=== Out on loan ===
Note: Flags indicate national team as defined under FIFA eligibility rules; some limited exceptions apply. Players may hold more than one non-FIFA nationality.

No.	Pos.	Nation	Player
—	DF	ARG	Sebastián Flores (at Numancia until 30 June 2027)

== Honours ==
- Segunda División B: 1989–90
- Tercera División: 1932–33, 1944–45, 1951–52, 1964–65, 1966–67, 1967–68
- Copa RFEF: 2002–03
- Copa RFEF (Asturias tournament): 1999, 2001, 2002, 2021, 2022, 2024
- Regional Championship of Asturias (2nd division): 1919–20, 1920–21, 1928–29
- Spanish Second Division Championship: 1920

== Famous players ==
Note: this list contains players that have played at least 100 league games and/or have reached international status.

- (Spain) Juanele
- (Spain) Marcelino Campanal
- (Spain) Mauri
- (Spain) Nicasio Goitisolo
