= 1930–31 Tercera División =

Tercera División
- Season: 1930–31
- Promoted: Celta
- Matches: 150
- Goals: 632 (4.21 per match)
- Biggest home win: Racing de Ferrol 9–0 Nacional de Madrid (14 December 1930)
- Biggest away win: Sestao 1–5 Patria Aragón (8 March 1931)
- Highest scoring: Celta 11–3 Stadium Avilesino (7 December 1930)

The 1930–31 Tercera División season was the third season since its establishment.

== Group 1 ==
=== League table ===
| Pos | Team | Pld | W | D | L | GF | GA | GD | Pts | Qualification or relegation |
|---|---|---|---|---|---|---|---|---|---|---|
| 1 | Celta Vigo | 14 | 8 | 4 | 2 | 46 | 18 | +28 | 20 | Qualification for the promotion play-off |
| 2 | Valladolid | 14 | 6 | 6 | 2 | 25 | 18 | +7 | 18 | |
| 3 | Racing Ferrol | 14 | 6 | 5 | 3 | 34 | 24 | +10 | 17 | |
| 4 | Gijón | 14 | 5 | 4 | 5 | 27 | 34 | −7 | 14 | |
| 5 | Nacional Madrid | 14 | 5 | 3 | 6 | 26 | 34 | −8 | 13 | |
| 6 | Cultural Leonesa | 14 | 3 | 5 | 6 | 25 | 33 | −8 | 11 | |
| 7 | Racing Madrid | 14 | 3 | 4 | 7 | 23 | 35 | −12 | 10 | |
| 8 | Stadium Avilesino | 14 | 4 | 1 | 9 | 29 | 39 | −10 | 9 | |

Source: AREFE
Rules for classification: 1) points; 2) head-to-head points; 3) head-to-head goal difference; 4) goal difference; 5) number of goals scored

== Group 2 ==
=== League table ===
| Pos | Team | Pld | W | D | L | GF | GA | GD | Pts | Qualification or relegation |
|---|---|---|---|---|---|---|---|---|---|---|
| 1 | Barakaldo | 14 | 10 | 3 | 1 | 38 | 13 | +25 | 23 | Qualification for the promotion play-off |
| 2 | Logroño | 14 | 10 | 2 | 2 | 45 | 19 | +26 | 22 | |
| 3 | Osasuna | 14 | 9 | 2 | 3 | 43 | 21 | +22 | 20 | |
| 4 | Zaragoza | 14 | 6 | 1 | 7 | 26 | 46 | −20 | 13 | |
| 5 | Sestao | 14 | 5 | 1 | 8 | 28 | 29 | −1 | 11 | |
| 6 | Tolosa | 14 | 4 | 2 | 8 | 40 | 41 | −1 | 10 (Note: Tolosa finished ahead of Patria Aragón on head-to-head goal difference: Tolosa–Patria Aragón 7–3, Patria Aragón–Tolosa 2–1) | |
| 7 | Patria Aragón | 14 | 5 | 0 | 9 | 27 | 40 | −13 | 10 | |
| 8 | Atlético Aurora | 14 | 1 | 1 | 12 | 13 | 51 | −38 | 3 | |

Source: AREFE
Rules for classification: 1) points; 2) head-to-head points; 3) head-to-head goal difference; 4) goal difference; 5) number of goals scored

== Group 3 ==
=== Group 3A ===
==== League table ====
| Pos | Team | Pld | W | D | L | GF | GA | GD | Pts | Qualification or relegation |
|---|---|---|---|---|---|---|---|---|---|---|
| 1 | Sporting Canet | 10 | 6 | 2 | 2 | 20 | 16 | +4 | 14 | Qualification for the group finals |
| 2 | Sabadell | 10 | 5 | 2 | 3 | 23 | 20 | +3 | 12 (Note: Sabadell finished ahead of Badalona and Júpiter on head-to-head points: Sabadell 5 pts, Badalona 4 pts, Júpiter 3 pts) | |
| 3 | Badalona | 10 | 5 | 2 | 3 | 23 | 11 | +12 | 12 | |
| 4 | Júpiter | 10 | 5 | 2 | 3 | 22 | 12 | +10 | 12 | |
| 5 | Gimnástico Valencia | 10 | 3 | 2 | 5 | 17 | 24 | −7 | 8 | |
| 6 | Levante | 10 | 0 | 2 | 8 | 11 | 33 | −22 | 2 | |

Source: AREFE
Rules for classification: 1) points; 2) head-to-head points; 3) head-to-head goal difference; 4) goal difference; 5) number of goals scored

=== Group 3B ===
==== League table ====
| Pos | Team | Pld | W | D | L | GF | GA | GD | Pts | Qualification or relegation |
|---|---|---|---|---|---|---|---|---|---|---|
| 1 | Recreativo | 4 | 2 | 1 | 1 | 8 | 6 | +2 | 5 | Qualification for the group finals |
| 2 | Malagueño | 4 | 2 | 0 | 2 | 8 | 6 | +2 | 4 | |
| 3 | Cartagena | 4 | 1 | 1 | 2 | 5 | 9 | −4 | 3 | |

Source: AREFE
Rules for classification: 1) points; 2) head-to-head points; 3) head-to-head goal difference; 4) goal difference; 5) number of goals scored

=== Group 3 finals ===
| Team 1 | Agg. | Team 2 | 1st leg | 2nd leg |
|---|---|---|---|---|
| Sporting Canet | 1–4 | Recreativo | 1–1 | 0–3 |

== Promotion play-off ==
=== Semi-final ===
| Team 1 | Agg. | Team 2 | 1st leg | 2nd leg |
|---|---|---|---|---|
| Barakaldo | 1–1 | Celta Vigo | 0–0 | 1–1 |

==== Tiebreaker ====
| Team 1 | Score | Team 2 |
|---|---|---|
| Celta Vigo | 3–2 | Barakaldo |

=== Finals ===
| Team 1 | Agg. | Team 2 | 1st leg | 2nd leg |
|---|---|---|---|---|
| Celta | 4–3 | Recreativo | 4–0 | 0–3 |
