= CF Badalona =

Spanish football team

Coordinates: 41.456264°N 2.236824°E

Badalona
- Full name: Club de Fútbol Badalona
- Nickname: Escapulats
- Founded: 15 May 1903
- Ground: Estadi Municipal, Badalona, Catalonia, Spain
- Capacity: 4,170
- President: Felipe Martínez
- Head coach: Pedro Dólera
- League: Tercera Federación – Group 5
- 2025–26: Tercera Federación – Group 5, 2nd of 18
Home colours	Away colours	Third colours

Club de Fútbol Badalona (Catalan pronunciation: [bəðəˈlonə]) is a Spanish football team based in Badalona, in the autonomous community of Catalonia. Founded in 1903 it plays in Tercera Federación – Group 5, temporarily holding home games at Estadi Municipal de Badalona, with a capacity of 4,170 seats.

Badalona acted as the reserve team of CF Badalona Futur during the 2022–23 season.

== History ==
Badalona was founded in 1903 as Football Bétulo Club, being renamed FC Badalona five years later. It played 14 seasons in the second division (1934–36, 1939–41, 1947–52, 1963–68), but this was prior to the creation of the intermediate Segunda División B.

As the club was constantly in economical problems, having to battle for the people's preference with basketball side Joventut Badalona, it nearly disappeared in the early 2000s (as the side was on the verge of celebrating 100 years) but, after another merge, this time with Unió de l'Esport Badaloní, resurfaced and changed names to Club de Fútbol Badalona – with the latter preserving its history – eventually making its debut in the (new) third level in 2004.

In January 2015, its home ground since 1936, the 10,000 seat Camp del Centenari, was demolished and the club was relocated temporarily to Camp de Montigalà, until the completion of the new 4,100 seat Estadi Municipal de Badalona, inaugurated on 29 January 2017. Average attendance for their home games has been 946 in 2018–19 and 947 in 2019–20.

The club finished 7th in Segunda División B, Group 3 in the 2018–19 season. Badalona had a solid performance at home, having lost only 4 of 19 matches at the Estadi Municipal. The club finished 19th in the COVID-19 shortened 2019–20 season, winning only 3 of their 12 home games, but was not relegated to Tercera División as the Royal Spanish Football Federation revoked all relegations due to the incomplete (3/4 of games were played) season.

On 19 July 2022, Badalona absorbed UE Costa Brava. As the club was relegated to Tercera Federación, Costa Brava changed name to Club de Fútbol Badalona Futur, with the original Badalona acting as a reserve team.

=== Club background ===
- Football Bétulo Club (1903–1907)
- Football Club Badalona (1907–1941)
- Club de Fútbol Badalona (1942–)

== Season to season ==
- As an independent team

Season	Tier	Division	Place	Copa del Rey
1929–30	3	3ª	2nd	
1930–31	3	3ª	3rd	Round of 16
1931–32	3	3ª	2nd	
1932–33	3	3ª	1st	
1933–34	3	3ª	4th	
1934–35	2	2ª	6th	Round of 16
1935–36	2	2ª	4th	group stage
1939–40	2	2ª	8th	
1940–41	2	2ª	12th	Round of 16
1941–42	3	1ª Reg.	8th	
1942–43	3	1ª Reg.	9th	
1943–44	4	1ª Reg.	8th	
1944–45	4	1ª Reg.	1st	
1945–46	3	3ª	1st	
1946–47	3	3ª	1st	
1947–48	2	2ª	10th	Round of 16
1948–49	2	2ª	13th	Fourth round
1949–50	2	2ª	15th	Second round
1950–51	2	2ª	13th	
1951–52	2	2ª	15th	

Season	Tier	Division	Place	Copa del Rey
1952–53	3	3ª	4th	
1953–54	3	3ª	11th	
1954–55	3	3ª	8th	
1955–56	3	3ª	5th	
1956–57	3	3ª	2nd	
1957–58	3	3ª	14th	
1958–59	3	3ª	6th	
1959–60	3	3ª	8th	
1960–61	3	3ª	1st	
1961–62	3	3ª	6th	
1962–63	3	3ª	2nd	
1963–64	2	2ª	14th	First round
1964–65	2	2ª	14th	First round
1965–66	2	2ª	12th	First round
1966–67	2	2ª	10th	First round
1967–68	2	2ª	9th	Round of 32
1968–69	3	3ª	4th	
1969–70	3	3ª	2nd	First round
1970–71	3	3ª	11th	First round
1971–72	3	3ª	17th	First round

Season	Tier	Division	Place	Copa del Rey
1972–73	4	Reg. Pref.	5th	
1973–74	4	Reg. Pref.	10th	
1974–75	4	Reg. Pref.	20th	
1975–76	5	1ª Reg.	2nd	
1976–77	4	Reg. Pref.	6th	
1977–78	4	3ª	13th	First round
1978–79	4	3ª	2nd	First round
1979–80	4	3ª	11th	Second round
1980–81	4	3ª	3rd	
1981–82	4	3ª	2nd	First round
1982–83	4	3ª	3rd	Second round
1983–84	4	3ª	3rd	First round
1984–85	4	3ª	11th	First round
1985–86	4	3ª	19th	
1986–87	5	Reg. Pref.	3rd	
1987–88	4	3ª	5th	
1988–89	4	3ª	18th	
1989–90	5	Reg. Pref.	7th	
1990–91	5	Reg. Pref.	3rd	
1991–92	5	1ª Cat.	4th	

Season	Tier	Division	Place	Copa del Rey
1992–93	5	1ª Cat.	5th	
1993–94	4	3ª	6th	
1994–95	4	3ª	18th	
1995–96	5	1ª Cat.	10th	
1996–97	5	1ª Cat.	2nd	
1997–98	4	3ª	12th	
1998–99	4	3ª	13th	
1999–2000	4	3ª	18th	
2000–01	5	1ª Cat.	18th	
2001–02	6	Pref. Terr.	2nd	
2002–03	4	3ª	1st	
2003–04	4	3ª	1st	First round
2004–05	3	2ª B	9th	Round of 64
2005–06	3	2ª B	1st	
2006–07	3	2ª B	5th	Round of 32
2007–08	3	2ª B	10th	Second round
2008–09	3	2ª B	9th	
2009–10	3	2ª B	12th	
2010–11	3	2ª B	2nd	
2011–12	3	2ª B	4th	First round

Season	Tier	Division	Place	Copa del Rey
2012–13	3	2ª B	13th	First round
2013–14	3	2ª B	13th	
2014–15	3	2ª B	7th	
2015–16	3	2ª B	13th	
2016–17	3	2ª B	5th	
2017–18	3	2ª B	8th	First round
2018–19	3	2ª B	7th	Second round
2019–20	3	2ª B	19th	Round of 32
2020–21	3	2ª B	6th / 5th	
2021–22	4	2ª RFEF	15th	
2022–23	5	3ª Fed.	13th	N/A (Note: Reserve team of Badalona Futur.)
2023–24	5	3ª Fed.	4th	
2024–25	5	3ª Fed.	5th	
2025–26	5	3ª Fed.	2nd	
2026–27	5	3ª Fed.		

- 14 seasons in Segunda División
- 17 seasons in Segunda División B
- 1 season in Segunda División RFEF
- 40 seasons in Tercera División
- 5 seasons in Tercera Federación

== Honours ==
- Copa Federación de España
  - Winners (1): 2003–04

== Players ==
=== Current squad ===
As of 16 September 2025

Note: Flags indicate national team as defined under FIFA eligibility rules; some limited exceptions apply. Players may hold more than one non-FIFA nationality.

No.	Pos.	Nation	Player
1	GK	ESP	Carlos Azón
2	DF	ESP	Marco Martínez
3	DF	ESP	Óscar Tarensí
4	DF	ESP	Xavi Manrique
5	DF	ESP	Sergio Ayala
6	MF	ESP	Carlos Guzmán
7	FW	ESP	Robert Simón
8	MF	ESP	Iván Amoedo
9	FW	ESP	Eric Pimentel
10	FW	ESP	Jaume Piñol
11	FW	ESP	Toni Larrosa

No.	Pos.	Nation	Player
13	GK	ESP	Víctor López
14	MF	VEN	Sergio Bermúdez
15	DF	MLI	Yaya Sidibé
16	DF	ESP	Óscar Reche
18	FW	ESP	Tom Diawara
19	FW	ESP	Óscar Gómez
20	FW	ESP	Pol Junior
21	DF	ESP	Nico Expósito
22	FW	ESP	Josu Rodríguez
23	MF	ESP	Dani Rocafull
24	DF	ESP	Toni Peris

== Notable players ==
- (Romania) Alexandru Maxim
- (Spain) (Dominican Republic) Mariano Díaz
- (Spain) Xavier Aguado (youth)
- (Spain) Jordi Ferrón
- (Spain) Xavier Pelegrí
- (Spain) Víctor Rodríguez
- (Spain) Isaías Sánchez
- (Spain) Pere Tarradellas

== Famous coaches ==
- (England) Fred Spiksley
- (Spain) Ramón Calderé
- (Spain) Josep Escolà
