= CE Júpiter =

Júpiter
- Full name: Club Esportiu Júpiter
- Founded: 1909
- Ground: La Verneda, Barcelona, Catalonia, Spain
- Capacity: 6,000
- President: Joan Rión
- Head coach: Juanjo García
- League: Primera Catalana – Group 3
- 2025–26: Lliga Elit, 14th of 16 (relegated)
- Website: Official website
Home colours	Away colours

Club Esportiu Júpiter is a Spanish football team based in Barcelona in the district of Sant Martí, in the autonomous community of Catalonia. Founded in 1909, it plays in the Primera Catalana – Group 3, holding home games at Camp Municipal La Verneda, with a capacity of 6,000 seats.

== History and identity ==
CE Júpiter was founded in 1909 in Barcelona’s working-class district of Poblenou by Scottish textile workers, and from that point onwards developed connections to Catalan nationalism and left-wing politics. Its early members were linked to anarchist trade unions and played active roles in labour struggles during turbulent periods of political unrest in Catalonia, including the violent conflicts known as pistolerismo.

The club’s crest historically featured Catalonia’s Senyera with a blue star, symbolising Catalan independence and leftist ideals, although it was forcibly altered during the dictatorship of Miguel Primo de Rivera. CE Júpiter’s ground served as a centre for anti-fascist organising, including hiding weapons during political violence, and was involved in the planned 1936 People's Olympiad, an alternative to the Berlin Olympics under Nazi Germany.

In April 2019, CE Júpiter hosted Clapton C.F.C. in a friendly match which celebrated the Spanish Republican spirit, with Clapton wearing kits inspired by the Second Spanish Republic and International Brigades. The match was touted as symbolising both clubs' commitment to anti-fascism and working class identity.

== Season to season ==
Season	Tier	Division	Place	Copa del Rey
1929–30	3	3ª	4th	
1930–31	3	3ª	4th	
1931–32	3	3ª	6th	
1932–33	3	3ª	5th	
1933–34	3	3ª	2nd	
1934–35	2	2ª	7th	3rd Round
1935–36	2	2ª	7th	1st Round
1940–41	4	1ª Reg.	5th	
1941–42	3	1ª Reg.	6th	
1942–43	4	1ª Reg. B	5th	
1943–44	4	1ª Reg.	1st	
1944–45	3	3ª	5th	
1945–46	3	3ª	2nd	
1946–47	3	3ª	2nd	
1947–48	3	3ª	3rd	
1948–49	3	3ª	11th	
1949–50	3	3ª	13th	
1950–51	3	3ª	15th	
1951–52	4	1ª Reg.	12th	
1952–53	4	1ª Reg.	11th	

Season	Tier	Division	Place	Copa del Rey
1953–54	4	1ª Reg.	6th	
1954–55	3	3ª	11th	
1955–56	3	3ª	11th	
1956–57	3	3ª	22nd	
1957–58	3	3ª	17th	
1958–59	4	1ª Reg.	1st	
1959–60	3	3ª	7th	
1960–61	3	3ª	8th	
1961–62	3	3ª	14th	
1962–63	4	1ª Reg.	2nd	
1963–64	4	1ª Reg.	3rd	
1964–65	4	1ª Reg.	1st	
1965–66	3	3ª	17th	
1966–67	3	3ª	14th	
1967–68	4	1ª Reg.	5th	
1968–69	4	Reg. Pref.	3rd	
1969–70	4	Reg. Pref.	1st	
1970–71	3	3ª	18th	
1971–72	4	Reg. Pref.	2nd	
1972–73	3	3ª	17th	

Season	Tier	Division	Place	Copa del Rey
1973–74	4	Reg. Pref.	12th	
1974–75	4	Reg. Pref.	11th	
1975–76	4	Reg. Pref.	2nd	
1976–77	4	Reg. Pref.	5th	
1977–78	4	3ª	12th	
1978–79	4	3ª	14th	
1979–80	4	3ª	8th	
1980–81	4	3ª	6th	
1981–82	4	3ª	5th	
1982–83	4	3ª	15th	
1983–84	4	3ª	10th	
1984–85	4	3ª	6th	
1985–86	4	3ª	11th	
1986–87	4	3ª	6th	
1987–88	3	2ª B	20th	
1988–89	4	3ª	16th	
1989–90	4	3ª	14th	
1990–91	4	3ª	12th	
1991–92	4	3ª	3rd	
1992–93	4	3ª	4th	

Season	Tier	Division	Place	Copa del Rey
1993–94	4	3ª	11th	
1994–95	4	3ª	10th	
1995–96	4	3ª	16th	
1996–97	4	3ª	14th	
1997–98	4	3ª	20th	
1998–99	5	1ª Cat.	5th	
1999–2000	5	1ª Cat.	2nd	
2000–01	4	3ª	16th	
2001–02	4	3ª	19th	
2002–03	5	1ª Cat.	5th	
2003–04	5	1ª Cat.	13th	
2004–05	5	1ª Cat.	6th	
2005–06	5	1ª Cat.	18th	
2006–07	6	Pref. Terr.	9th	
2007–08	6	Pref. Terr.	16th	
2008–09	7	1ª Terr.	5th	
2009–10	7	1ª Terr.	1st	
2010–11	6	Pref. Terr.	3rd	
2011–12	5	1ª Cat.	2nd	
2012–13	4	3ª	18th	

Season	Tier	Division	Place	Copa del Rey
2013–14	5	1ª Cat.	7th	
2014–15	5	1ª Cat.	1st	
2015–16	4	3ª	9th	
2016–17	4	3ª	19th	
2017–18	5	1ª Cat.	12th	
2018–19	5	1ª Cat.	10th	
2019–20	5	1ª Cat.	8th	
2020–21	5	1ª Cat.	8th	
2021–22	6	1ª Cat.	11th	
2022–23	7	2ª Cat.	2nd	
2023–24	7	1ª Cat.	5th	
2024–25	7	1ª Cat.	2nd	
2025–26	6	Lliga Elit	14th	
2026–27	7	1ª Cat.		

- 2 seasons in Segunda División
- 1 season in Segunda División B
- 46 seasons in Tercera División

== Current squad ==
As of 17 April 2025

Note: Flags indicate national team as defined under FIFA eligibility rules; some limited exceptions apply. Players may hold more than one non-FIFA nationality.

No.	Pos.	Nation	Player
1	GK	ESP	Xavi Bertran
2	FW	ESP	David Leira
3	DF	ESP	Adria Bassols
4	DF	ESP	Óscar Oliver
5	DF	ESP	Oscar Peña
6	MF	ESP	Ricky López
7	MF	ESP	Cristian Becerra
8	MF	ESP	Patrick Chico
9	MF	ESP	Llorenç Genesca
10	MF	ESP	Adrián Baron

No.	Pos.	Nation	Player
11	FW	ESP	Sergi Artur Monsó
12	FW	ESP	Dani Sánchez
13	GK	ESP	Carlos Nadal
14	MF	ESP	Alex García
15	MF	ESP	Sergio Peña
16	FW	ESP	Óscar Jiménez
17	MF	ESP	Josep Cañete
19	MF	ESP	Iker Vaquera
20	MF	ESP	Alfredo Solar
21	FW	ESP	Albert Gurrea
22	DF	ESP	Sergi Ayllón
23	FW	ESP	Biel Rodríguez

== Famous players ==
- (Spain) Crisant Bosch
- (Spain) José Parra
- (Spain) Joaquim Rifé
