= Gipuzkoa Championship =

Spanish football tournament

The Gipuzkoa Football Federation's logo

The Gipuzkoa Regional Championship (Spanish: Campeonato Regional de Guipúzcoa; Basque: Gipuzkoako Herrialde Txapelketa) was an official football tournament in Spain, organised by the Gipuzkoan Football Federation in which affiliated clubs participated. It was played annually between 1918 and 1940 and served to elect the representative of the territory in the Copa del Rey.

== History ==
In 1918, following several disagreements between the clubs in the North Federation of Spanish football which covered the Basque provinces of Biscay and Gipuzkoa, culminating in a pivotal championship match between Athletic Bilbao and Real Sociedad being abandoned, the National Committee of the Spanish Federation agreed to divide the existing region into separate championships. Thus, for the 1918–19 season Gipuzkoan clubs launched their own championship while the North Championship continued comprising the Biscay teams and the re-entry of Racing Santander, representing neighbouring Cantabria. In their last season as members of the North group, Gipuzkoans Real Unión took the title (following the aforementioned dispute between Athletic and Real Sociedad) and went on win the 1918 Copa del Rey.

Clubs belonging to other provinces were also affiliated to the Gipuzkoan Federation, together with those based in the province itself: clubs from Navarre and La Rioja were affiliated, the most notable being those of CA Osasuna and CD Logroño, who played in the top level of the Gipuzkoa championship; Logroño eventually even managed to win the title twice. In 1928 the Navarre Federation was founded and Osasuna left the Gipuzkoa championship, although by 1929 they had returned, with the competition becoming the 'Gipuzkoa-Navarre Combined Championship'. In 1931, clubs from Aragón were added and the name changed to the 'Gipuzkoa-Navarre-Aragón Combined Championship'; however, the Gipuzkoan teams remained dominant.

In 1934 the Spanish Federation carried out a significant restructuring of the national tournaments, so that the regional championships were replaced by superregional ones, in which the best clubs of different regional federations were grouped. In the case of the Basque region, the 'Basque Cup' was launched in 1934–35. The teams of Gipuzkoa and Navarre were integrated into the Basque Cup, while CD Logroño and the Aragón teams were integrated into a new 'Cantabria-Castile-Aragón Cup'. These tournaments were played for two years, until being interrupted by the outbreak of the Spanish Civil War.

During the last months of the war in 1939, football activity was resumed in some areas controlled by the Nationalist side, under the impulse of the Spanish Federation and the regional federations. Six teams participated in the reborn Gipuzkoa Championship, the novelty of which was the inclusion of teams from Álava in the federation, since until then they had been affiliated to the Biscay Championship. The champions Alavés and runners-up Donostia (Note: Real Sociedad changed its name due to the demands of the Spanish Second Republic.) took part in the 1939 Copa del Generalísimo.

The Gipuzkoa-Navarre-Aragón Combined Championship resumed in the 1939–40 season, again providing qualification for the Spanish Cup, since then called Copa del Generalísimo. However, restructuring approved by the Spanish Federation in 1940 quickly led to the disappearance of the regional championships.

== Seasons summary ==
Season (Note: Clubs from Navarre and La Rioja also took part)	Champion	Copa del Rey (Note: Progress made in the Copa del Rey by qualifiers from the regional championship.)	Runner-up	Copa del Rey (Note: Runners-up also qualified for the Copa del Rey from 1926.)
1918–19	Real Sociedad	Quarter-finals	Real Unión	N/A
1919–20	Real Unión	Semi-finals	Real Sociedad	N/A
1920–21	Real Unión	Semi-finals	Real Sociedad	N/A
1921–22	Real Unión	Runners-up	Real Sociedad	N/A
1922–23	Real Sociedad	Semi-finals	Real Unión	N/A
1923–24	Real Unión	Winners	Real Sociedad	N/A
1924–25	Real Sociedad	Group stage	Real Unión	N/A
1925–26	Real Unión	Semi-finals	Real Sociedad	Quarter-finals
1926–27	Real Sociedad	Group stage	Real Unión	Winners
1927–28	Real Unión	Group stage	Real Sociedad	Runners-up
1928–29 (Note: Clubs from Navarre left the competition for 1928–29 and formed their own.)	Real Sociedad	Round of 16	CD Logroño	Round of 16
1929–30 (Note: Clubs from Navarre returned and the competition was known as the Gipuzkoa-Navarre Combined Championship.)	Real Unión	Quarter-finals	Real Sociedad	Round of 16
1930–31	Real Unión	Quarter-finals	CD Logroño	Semi-finals
1931–32 (Note: Clubs from Aragón took part and the competition was known as the Gipuzkoa-Navarre-Aragón Combined Championship.)	CD Logroño (Note: The designation of CD Logroño as champion is disputed. Although they obtained more points than Donostia, when Zaragoza withdrew from the competition by agreement of the national federation, the results of their matches were considered invalid. This would have given the title to Donostia by goal-average.)	Round of 32	Donostia FC	Quarter-finals
1932–33	Donostia FC	Round of 32	CD Logroño	Round of 16
1933–34	CD Logroño	Round of 32	Donostia FC	Round of 16
1934–35 (Note: Clubs from Gipuzkoa and Navarre played in the Basque Cup (along with those from Álava and Biscay); those from La Rioja and Aragón played in the Cantabria-Castile-Aragón Cup.)	Athletic Club	Round of 16	CA Osasuna	Semi-finals
1935–36	Arenas Club de Getxo	Round of 16	Real Unión	Group stage
1936–1939	No competition due to the Spanish Civil War			
1939 (Note: Reverted to Gipuzkoa championship; clubs from Álava also took part; clubs in Navarre and Aragón held their own competitions.)	Deportivo Alavés	Semi-finals	Donostia FC	Quarter-finals
1939–40	Zaragoza CF	Semi-finals	Osasuna	Round of 16

== Summary of Champions ==
Club	Winners	Runners-up	Winning years	Runner-up years
Real Unión	8	4	1919–20, 1920–21, 1921–22, 1923–24, 1925–26, 1927–28, 1929–30, 1930–31 (Note: Also winners of the North Championship once in 1917–18.)	1918–19, 1922–23, 1924–25, 1926–27 (Note: Also runners-up in the Basque Cup in 1935–36.)
Real Sociedad	6	10	1918–19, 1922–23, 1924–25, 1926–27, 1928–29, 1932–33	1919–20, 1920–21, 1921–22, 1923–24, 1925–26, 1927–28, 1929–30, 1931–32, 1933–34, 1939 (Note: Also runners-up twice in the North Championship.)
CD Logroño	2	3	1931–32, 1933–34	1928–29, 1930–31, 1932–33
Deportivo Alavés	1	–	1939	–
Real Zaragoza	1	–	1939–40	–
CA Osasuna	–	1	–	1939–40 (Note: Also runners-up in the Basque Cup in 1934–35.)

== See also ==
- Gipuzkoa autonomous football team
