= 1935 Copa del Presidente de la República =

35th Copa del Rey

Tournament details
- Country: Spain
- Teams: 50

Final positions
- Champions: Sevilla (1st title)
- Runners-up: Sabadell

Tournament statistics
- Matches played: 101

The Copa del Presidente de la República 1935 (President of the Republic's Cup) was the 35th staging of the Copa del Rey, the Spanish football cup competition.

The competition started in March 1935 and concluded on June 30, 1935, with the Final, held at the Estadio Chamartín in Madrid. Sevilla FC beat CE Sabadell for their first title in the competition.

== First round ==
Team 1	Agg.	Team 2	1st leg	2nd leg
Santoña FC	2–1	Arenas SD Zaragoza	1-1	1–0
CD Roca	1–3	CD Indarra	1-2	0–1
Nules FC	3–7	Cartagena FC	2-1	1–6

Xerez SC received a bye.

== Second round ==
Team 1	Agg.	Team 2	1st leg	2nd leg
Unión Sporting Club	3–2	Racing Club Langreano	0-2	3–0
Santoña FC	3–7	AD Ferroviaria	3-2	0–5
CD Indarra	1–3	CD Guecho	0-0	1–3
Cartagena FC	4–6	Xerez SC	3-1	1–5

== Third round ==
Team 1	Agg.	Team 2	1st leg	2nd leg
CD Júpiter	5–3	CD Guecho	4-0	1–3
SC La Plana	1–7	Granollers CD	0-4	1-3
Recreativo Granada	2-2	Xerez SC	1-1	1-1
Racing Ferrol		AD Ferroviaria		
Deportivo La Coruña		Unión Sporting Club	1-0	0-2

- Tiebreaker

Team 1	Score	Team 2
Recreativo Granada	1–4	Xerez SC

== Fourth round ==
Team 1	Agg.	Team 2	1st leg	2nd leg
Ceuta Sport	3–2	Real Club Victoria	2–0	1–2
AD Ferroviaria	9–4	Deportivo La Coruña	5–1	4-3
Xerez SC	1–2	CD Júpiter	1-1	0–1
CD Constancia	3–5	Granollers CD	2-2	1-3

== Fifth round ==
Team 1	Agg.	Team 2	1st leg	2nd leg
Stadium Avilesino	2–5	Sporting Gijón	2–2	0-3
AD Ferroviaria	1–9	Valladolid Deportivo	0-5	1–4
Athletic Madrid	3–2	Nacional Madrid	3-2	
Baracaldo FC	5–6	Arenas Club	3-2	2–4
Unión Club	2-2	Donostia FC	2–0	0-2
Zaragoza FC	5–0	CD Júpiter	2–0	3-0
Granollers CD	4–5	CD Español	4-2	0–3
Gerona FC	2–7	FC Badalona	0-1	2–6
Gimnástico Valencia	5–14	Valencia FC	2–5	3–9
Murcia FC	2–4	Hércules FC	2–3	0-1
Elche CF	5–0	CD Malacitano	5-0	
Real Betis	6-0	Ceuta Sport	6-0	

- Tiebreaker

Team 1	Score	Team 2
Real Unión	3–0	Donostia FC

== Sixth round ==
Team 1	Agg.	Team 2	1st leg	2nd leg
Sporting Gijón	2-1	Valladolid Deportivo	2-1	
Arenas Club	1–6	Athletic Madrid	0-3	1-3
Zaragoza FC	4–1	Unión Club	2–0	2-1
FC Badalona	5–2	CD Español	5-2	
Valencia FC	4–3	Hércules FC	3–1	1-2
Real Betis	5–0	Elche CF	5-0	

== Round of 16 ==
Team 1	Agg.	Team 2	1st leg	2nd leg
Athletic Bilbao	2–5	Real Betis	1-2	1-3
Club Celta	4–8	CD Sabadell	4-3	0-5
Levante FC	5–2	Valencia CF	4-1	1-1
Sporting Gijón	3–7	FC Barcelona	1-2	2-5
Athletic Madrid	5–5	Racing Santander	4-3	1-2
Sevilla FC	1–0	Madrid FC	1-0	0-0
Real Zaragoza	2–1	Real Oviedo	2-0	0-1
FC Badalona	6–8	CA Osasuna	4-3	2-5

- Tiebreaker

Team 1	Score	Team 2
Athletic Madrid	3–1	Racing Santander

== Quarter-finals ==
Team 1	Agg.	Team 2	1st leg	2nd leg
Real Betis	1–3	CD Sabadell	1-1	0-2
FC Barcelona	3–3	Levante FC	2-2	1-1
Athletic Madrid	4–5	Sevilla FC	2-2	2-3
Real Zaragoza	5-7	CA Osasuna	1-3	1-4

- Tiebreaker

Team 1	Score	Team 2
Levante FC	3–0	FC Barcelona

== Semi-finals ==
Team 1	Agg.	Team 2	1st leg	2nd leg
Levante FC	1–4	CD Sabadell	1-2	0-2
Sevilla FC	5–1	CA Osasuna	4-1	1-0

== Final ==
30 June 1935
16:45 CET

Sevilla FC	3–0	CD Sabadell FC
Campanal 36', 78'; Bracero 89'	Report (in Spanish)

Estadio Chamartín, Madrid
Attendance: 15,000
Referee: Pedro Escartín

Copa del Rey 1935 Winners
Sevilla FC
1st title
