= 1935–36 Segunda División =

8th season of the second-tier football league in Spain

Segunda División
- Season: 1935–36
- Champions: Celta de Vigo
- Promoted: Celta de Vigo; Zaragoza FC
- Relegated: CD Nacional de Madrid; Unión SC Vigo; CE Júpiter
- Matches: 198
- Goals: 752 (3.8 per match)
- Top goalscorer: Nolete (19 goals)
- Best goalkeeper: Andrés Lerín (0.81 goals/match)

The 1935–36 Segunda División season saw 24 teams participate in the second flight Spanish league. Celta and Zaragoza were promoted to Primera División, after both clubs won 5–0, and Arenas lost 0–1, in the final round of the promotion playoff. Nacional, Unión Sportiva Vigo, Júpiter, Real Unión, Mirandilla and Elche were relegated to Regional.

== Group I ==
=== Teams ===
Location of teams in Segunda División 1935-36 G-1

Club	City	Stadium
Celta de Vigo	Vigo	Balaídos
Deportivo de La Coruña	La Coruña	Riazor
CD Nacional de Madrid	Madrid	El Parral
Sporting de Gijón	Gijón	El Molinón
Stadium Club Avilesino	Avilés	Las Arobias
Unión SC Vigo	Vigo	Campo da Florida
Valladolid Deportivo	Valladolid	Sociedad Taurina
Zaragoza FC	Zaragoza	Torrero

=== League table ===
Pos	Team	Pld	W	D	L	GF	GA	GD	Pts	Qualification or relegation
1	Celta de Vigo	14	8	2	4	43	24	+19	18	Promotion playoff
2	Zaragoza FC	14	7	4	3	31	12	+19	18	Promotion playoff
3	Sporting de Gijón	14	6	4	4	32	26	+6	16	
4	C. Valladolid Dep.	14	6	3	5	31	26	+5	15	
5	Stadium Avilesino	14	6	2	6	26	41	−15	14	
6	CD Nacional de Madrid	14	6	1	7	34	27	+7	13	Relegated to Regional
7	Deportivo de La Coruña	14	4	3	7	19	35	−16	11	
8	Unión SC Vigo	14	3	1	10	27	52	−25	7	Relegated to Regional

Source: BDFútbol

=== Results ===
Home \ Away	CEL	DEP	NAC	SPO	STA	UNI	VLL	ZAR
Celta de Vigo		5–0	5–2	2–1	6–3	6–1	8–1	2–1
Deportivo de La Coruña	2–1		2–2	0–3	3–1	4–1	2–1	0–0
CD Nacional de Madrid	5–1	4–0		5–1	5–0	3–0	0–1	0–1
Real Gijón CF	1–1	2–2	3–2		1–1	6–0	2–0	3–0
Stadium Avilesino	2–1	2–0	5–1	2–4		2–1	1–1	2–1
Unión SC Vigo	2–3	5–3	3–4	5–3	2–5		4–2	0–0
Valladolid Deportivo	2–1	5–0	2–1	2–2	9–0	4–1		1–1
Zaragoza FC	1–1	3–1	3–0	4–0	6–0	6–1	3–0	

Source: BDFútbol
Legend: Blue = home team win; Yellow = draw; Red = away team win.

== Group II ==
=== Teams ===
Location of teams in Segunda División 1935-36 G-2

Club	City	Stadium
Arenas Club	Guecho	Ibaiondo
FC Badalona	Badalona	Sant Adrià
Barakaldo CF	Baracaldo	Lasesarre
Donostia CF	San Sebastián	Atocha
Girona FC	Gerona	Vista Alegre
CE Júpiter	Barcelona	Lope de Vega
CS Sabadell FC	Sabadell	Creu Alta
Unión Club Irún	Irun	Stadium Gal

=== League Table ===
Pos	Team	Pld	W	D	L	GF	GA	GD	Pts	Qualification or relegation
1	Girona FC	14	10	1	3	34	13	+21	21	Promotion playoff
2	Arenas C. Guecho	14	9	2	3	32	27	+5	20	Promotion playoff
3	Barakaldo FBC	14	8	1	5	32	25	+7	17	
4	FC Badalona	14	5	2	7	28	31	−3	12	
5	CS Sabadell FC	14	5	2	7	26	29	−3	12	
6	Donostia FC	14	5	2	7	25	35	−10	12	
7	CE Júpiter	14	4	2	8	23	35	−12	10	Relegated to Regional
8	Unión Club Irún	14	3	2	9	22	27	−5	8	Relegated to Regional

Source: BDFútbol

=== Results ===
Home \ Away	ARE	BAD	BAR	DON	GIR	JÚP	SAB	UNI
Arenas Club		1–0	2–4	2–0	3–1	5–3	2–2	3–0
FC Badalona	2–5		6–2	3–1	1–2	4–2	3–0	2–1
Barakaldo FBC	1–2	1–0		7–0	3–0	1–0	2–0	2–2
Donostia FC	2–3	2–2	5–1		3–2	3–2	4–2	2–1
Girona FC	4–0	5–0	3–2	2–0		4–0	0–0	2–0
CE Júpiter	1–1	4–1	3–1	0–0	0–3		3–2	4–1
CS Sabadell FC	6–1	2–0	1–3	4–2	0–2	3–0		3–1
Unión Club Irún	2–3	1–1	0–2	3–0	1–3	6–1	3–0	

Source: BDFútbol
Legend: Blue = home team win; Yellow = draw; Red = away team win.

== Group III ==
=== Teams ===
Location of teams in Segunda División 1935-36 G-3

Club	City	Stadium
Elche FC	Elche	Altabix
Gimnástico FC	Valencia	Vallejo
Levante FC	Valencia	Hondo del Grao
CD Malacitano	Málaga	Baños del Carmen
SCD Mirandilla FC	Cádiz	La Mirandilla
Murcia FC	Murcia	La Condomina
Recreativo Granada	Granada	Los Cármenes
Xerez FC	Jerez de la Frontera	Domecq

=== League Table ===
Pos	Team	Pld	W	D	L	GF	GA	GD	Pts	Qualification or relegation
1	Murcia FC	14	10	1	3	29	15	+14	21	Promotion playoff
2	Xerez FC	14	8	2	4	25	13	+12	18	Promotion playoff
3	Levante FC	14	7	2	5	35	20	+15	16	
4	Gimnástico FC	14	4	5	5	18	20	−2	13	
5	CD Malacitano	14	6	0	8	21	22	−1	12	
6	Recreativo Granada	14	4	3	7	20	23	−3	11	
7	CD Mirandilla	14	5	1	8	21	30	−9	11	Relegated to Regional
8	Elche FC	14	4	2	8	18	44	−26	10	Relegated to Regional

Source: BDFútbol

=== Results ===
Home \ Away	ELC	GIM	LEV	MAL	MIR	MUR	REC	XER
Elche FC		2–2	5–4	3–1	3–1	2–4	1–0	1–1
Gimnástico FC	1–0		1–1	2–0	2–0	1–1	4–1	1–1
Levante FC	5–1	2–1		1–0	7–2	4–0	3–1	2–0
CD Malacitano	4–1	4–2	3–2		4–1	0–1	2–1	2–1
SCD Mirandilla CF	6–0	3–1	2–1	1–0		0–1	2–2	2–1
Murcia FC	7–0	3–0	2–0	2–0	4–1		2–1	2–0
Recreativo Granada	3–0	0–0	2–2	2–0	2–1	4–0		0–1
Xerez FC	5–0	2–0	2–1	2–1	2–0	2–0	5–1	

Source: BDFútbol
Legend: Blue = home team win; Yellow = draw; Red = away team win.

== Promotion playoff ==
Pos	Team	Pld	W	D	L	GF	GA	GD	Pts	Promotion
1	Celta de Vigo	10	6	1	3	29	12	+17	13	Promoted to Primera División
2	Zaragoza FC	10	6	1	3	19	16	+3	13	Promoted to Primera División
3	Arenas de Guecho	10	5	1	4	16	13	+3	11	
4	Murcia FC	10	3	3	4	11	12	−1	9	
5	Gerona FC	10	2	3	5	8	20	−12	7	
6	Xerez FC	10	3	1	6	17	27	−10	7	

=== Results ===
Home \ Away	ARE	CEL	GIR	MUR	XER	ZAR
Arenas Club		5–1	3–0	1–0	4–1	2–0
Celta de Vigo	6–1		3–0	2–0	5–0	7–0
Girona FC	0–0	2–0		1–1	2–1	0–2
Murcia FC	1–0	1–1	2–0		5–2	1–1
Xerez FC	3–0	1–3	3–3	1–0		4–0
Zaragoza FC	1–0	2–1	5–0	3–0	5–1	

Source: Resultados Fútbol
Legend: Blue = home team win; Yellow = draw; Red = away team win.
