= 1932–33 Segunda División =

5th season of the second-tier football league in Spain

Segunda División
- Season: 1932–33
- Champions: Oviedo FC
- Promoted: Oviedo FC
- Relegated: CD Castellón
- Matches: 86
- Goals: 393 (4.57 per match)
- Top goalscorer: Ramón Herrera (33 goals)
- Best goalkeeper: Óscar Álvarez (1.17 goals/match)
- Biggest home win: Unión Irún 9–1 Murcia FC (15 January 1933)
- Biggest away win: Athletic Club Madrid 1–5 CA Osasuna (11 December 1932)
- Highest scoring: Unión Irún 9–1 Murcia FC (15 January 1933); Sporting de Gijón 8–2 CA Osasuna (25 December 1932)

The 1932–33 Segunda División season saw 10 teams participate in the second flight Spanish league. Real Oviedo was promoted to Primera División. Castellón was relegated to Tercera División.

== Teams ==
Location of teams in Segunda División 1932-33

Club	City	Stadium
Athletic Club Madrid	Madrid	Metropolitano
CD Castellón	Castellón de la Plana	El Sequiol
Celta de Vigo	Vigo	Balaídos
Deportivo de La Coruña	La Coruña	Riazor
Murcia FC	Murcia	La Condomina
CA Osasuna	Pamplona	San Juan
Oviedo FC	Oviedo	Buenavista
Sevilla FC	Seville	Nervión
Sporting de Gijón	Gijón	El Molinón
Unión Club Irún	Irun	Stadium Gal

== Final table ==
Pos	Team	Pld	W	D	L	GF	GA	GD	Pts	Promotion or relegation
1	Oviedo FC	18	12	3	3	58	26	+32	27	Promoted to Primera División
2	Athletic Club Madrid	18	10	4	4	40	35	+5	24	
3	Murcia FC	18	9	2	7	33	41	−8	20	
4	Unión Club de Irún	18	9	2	7	51	36	+15	20	
5	Deportivo de La Coruña	18	8	4	6	38	38	0	20	
6	Sporting de Gijón	18	8	2	8	49	40	+9	18	
7	Club Celta	18	8	1	9	36	38	−2	17	
8	CA Osasuna	18	7	3	8	45	47	−2	17	
9	Sevilla FC	18	5	3	10	29	38	−9	13	
10	CD Castellón	18	2	0	16	14	54	−40	4 (Note: Castellón's field was closed, and the club did not want to play 4 last games in other. All the winning points were given to the rivals (Deportivo, Sporting, Celta and Osasuna).)	Relegated to Tercera División

Source: BDFútbol

== Results ==
Home \ Away	ATL	CAS	CEL	DEP	MUR	OSA	OVI	SEV	SPO	UNI
Athletic Club Madrid		8–1	2–0	0–0	4–2	1–5	3–0	2–1	2–0	4–2
CD Castellón	3–4				1–3		0–2	1–3		3–0
Celta de Vigo	2–4	4–1		4–1	1–2	3–0	2–1	4–1	3–4	4–2
Deportivo de La Coruña	1–1	4–0	7–2		1–1	5–0	3–1	3–1	4–3	5–0
Murcia FC	4–1	1–0	1–2	1–0		2–1	1–3	3–2	5–1	2–1
CA Osasuna	2–2	1–2	4–2	8–1	6–1		3–3	4–0	3–2	1–2
Oviedo FC	5–1	8–1	2–1	6–1	3–0	7–1		5–1	3–3	2–0
Sevilla FC	0–0	4–0	1–1	1–1	3–1	3–1	1–2		5–2	1–2
Sporting de Gijón	0–1	6–1	3–1	2–0	2–2	8–2	2–3	5–1		5–1
Unión Club Irún	7–1	6–0	3–0	7–1	9–1	3–3	2–2	1–0	3–1	

Source: BDFútbol
Legend: Blue = home team win; Yellow = draw; Red = away team win.
