= 1934–35 Segunda División =

7th season of the second-tier football league in Spain

Segunda División
- Season: 1934–35
- Champions: Hércules CF
- Promoted: Hércules CF; CA Osasuna
- Relegated: Racing de Ferrol; CD Logroño; Sport La Plana
- Matches: 181
- Goals: 651 (3.6 per match)

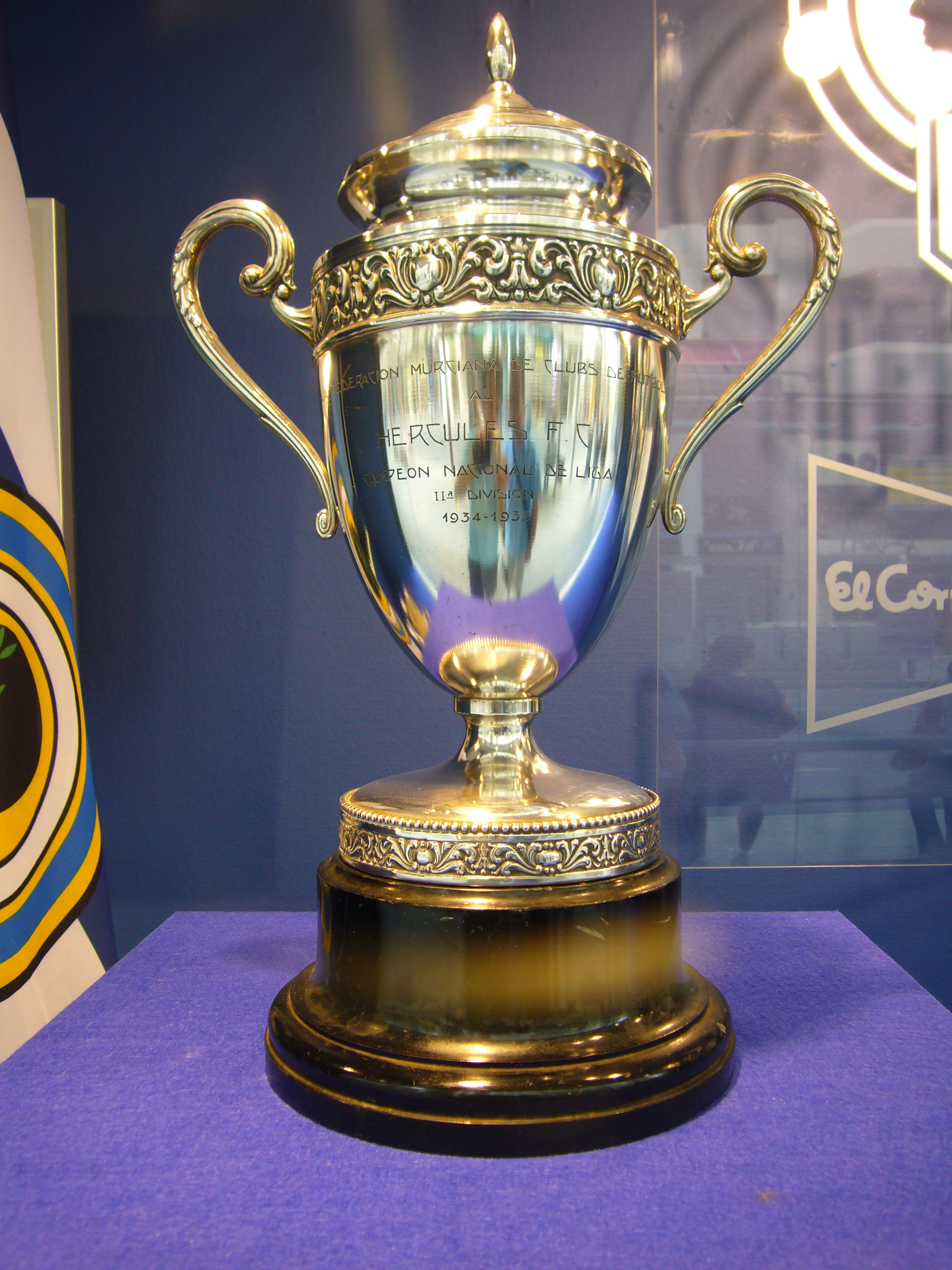

The 1934–35 Segunda División season saw 24 teams participate in the second flight Spanish league. Hércules and Osasuna were promoted to Primera División. Racing Ferrol, Logroño and Sport La Plana were relegated to Regional.

== Group I ==
=== Teams ===
Location of teams in Segunda División 1934-35 G-1

Club	City	Stadium
Baracaldo FC	Baracaldo	Lasesarre
Celta de Vigo	Vigo	Balaídos
Deportivo de La Coruña	La Coruña	Riazor
CD Nacional de Madrid	Madrid	El Parral
Racing Ferrol FC	Ferrol	Inferniño
Sporting de Gijón	Gijón	El Molinón
Stadium Club Avilesino	Avilés	Las Arobias
Club Valladolid Deportivo	Valladolid	Sociedad Taurina

=== League table ===
Pos	Team	Pld	W	D	L	GF	GA	GD	Pts	Qualification or relegation
1	Celta de Vigo	14	9	2	3	44	21	+23	20	Promotion playoff
2	Club Valladolid Deportivo	14	8	2	4	41	21	+20	18	Promotion playoff
3	Sporting de Gijón	14	7	2	5	23	21	+2	16	
4	Stadium Avilesino	14	6	2	6	28	38	−10	14	
5	Nacional de Madrid	14	6	2	6	25	26	−1	14	
6	Baracaldo FC	14	5	1	8	22	23	−1	11	
7	Deportivo de La Coruña	14	3	4	7	14	27	−13	10	
8	Racing Ferrol FC	14	3	3	8	12	32	−20	9	Relegated to Regional

Source: BDFútbol

=== Results ===
Home \ Away	BAR	CEL	DEP	NAC	RFE	SPO	STA	VLL
Baracaldo FC		2–0	3–0	1–2	4–3	2–1	9–1	0–2
Celta de Vigo	1–1		5–1	3–1	5–0	3–1	12–2	4–3
Deportivo de La Coruña	3–0	4–2		4–3	0–0	0–0	1–2	0–0
Nacional de Madrid	2–0	0–2	3–0		3–0	2–1	1–1	4–3
Racing Ferrol FC	1–0	1–2	0–0	2–2		1–0	2–1	1–2
Sporting de Gijón	1–0	2–1	3–0	3–0	2–1		2–1	2–2
Stadium Avilesino	3–0	2–2	2–1	3–1	5–0	0–2		5–0
Valladolid Deportivo	3–0	1–2	4–0	4–1	4–0	8–2	5–0	

Source: BDFútbol
Legend: Blue = home team win; Yellow = draw; Red = away team win.

== Group II ==
=== Teams ===
Location of teams in Segunda División 1934-35 G-2

Club	City	Stadium
FC Badalona	Badalona	Sant Adrià
Girona FC	Gerona	Vista Alegre
CE Júpiter	Barcelona	Lope de Vega
CD Logroño	Logroño	Las Gaunas
CA Osasuna	Pamplona	San Juan
CS Sabadell FC	Sabadell	Creu Alta
Unión Club Irún	Irun	Stadium Gal
Zaragoza FC	Zaragoza	Torrero

=== League table ===
Pos	Team	Pld	W	D	L	GF	GA	GD	Pts	Qualification or relegation
1	CA Osasuna	12	9	1	2	31	9	+22	19	Promotion playoff
2	CS Sabadell	12	6	3	3	22	22	0	15	Promotion playoff
3	Zaragoza FC	12	6	2	4	30	17	+13	14	
4	Girona FC	12	4	4	4	12	15	−3	12	
5	Unión Club Irún	12	2	5	5	19	29	−10	9	
6	FC Badalona	12	3	2	7	16	28	−12	8	
7	CE Júpiter	12	1	5	6	12	22	−10	7	
8	CD Logroño	3	0	0	3	2	20	−18	0 (Note: Logroño retired after 3 games so all their games were not counted.)	Relegated to Regional

Source: BDFútbol

=== Results ===
Home \ Away	BAD	GIR	JÚP	LOG	OSA	SAB	UNI	ZAR
FC Badalona		1–1	0–2		1–3	1–3	3–1	2–1
Girona FC	2–1		2–0		1–0	1–2	1–1	2–1
CE Júpiter	0–3	1–1			0–1	1–3	1–1	0–0
CD Logroño							1–7	
CA Osasuna	7–0	3–1	1–1			2–1	4–0	6–2
CS Sabadell FC	1–0	0–0	2–2	8–1	0–2		3–2	2–1
Unión Club Irún	3–3	1–0	4–2		0–1	5–5		0–0
Zaragoza FC	4–1	4–0	4–2	5–0	2–1	5–0	6–1	

Source: BDFútbol
Legend: Blue = home team win; Yellow = draw; Red = away team win.

== Group III ==
=== Teams ===
Location of teams in Segunda División 1934-35 G-3

Club	City	Stadium
Elche FC	Elche	Altabix
Gimnástico FC	Valencia	Vallejo
Hércules CF	Alicante	La Viña
Levante FC	Valencia	Hondo del Grao
CD Malacitano	Málaga	Baños del Carmen
Murcia FC	Murcia	La Condomina
Recreativo Granada	Granada	Los Cármenes
Sport La Plana	Castellón de la Plana	El Sequiol

=== League table ===
Pos	Team	Pld	W	D	L	GF	GA	GD	Pts	Qualification or relegation
1	Hércules FC	14	10	2	2	32	13	+19	22	Promotion playoff
2	Murcia FC	14	7	3	4	28	24	+4	17	Promotion playoff
3	Levante FC	14	5	6	3	27	19	+8	16	
4	Elche FC	14	5	4	5	22	24	−2	14	
5	CD Malacitano	14	6	2	6	33	27	+6	14	
6	Gimnástico FC	14	6	1	7	23	22	+1	13	
7	Recreativo Granada	14	6	1	7	22	22	0	13	
8	Sport La Plana	14	1	1	12	7	43	−36	3	Relegated to Regional

Source: BDFútbol

=== Results ===
Home \ Away	ELC	GIM	HÉR	LEV	MAL	MUR	REC	PLA
Elche FC		1–0	2–2	2–1	4–0	1–1	0–3	3–0
Gimnástico FC	5–2		0–1	0–0	6–2	4–2	0–2	4–1
Hércules CF	2–1	1–0		4–0	3–1	3–1	3–0	8–1
Levante FC	2–2	5–0	3–1		2–2	3–1	4–0	5–0
CD Malacitano	3–1	3–0	2–3	0–0		5–0	3–1	5–2
Murcia FC	3–0	2–0	0–0	2–2	3–2		4–2	4–1
Recreativo Granada	2–2	0–2	2–0	5–0	2–1	0–2		3–0
Sport La Plana	0–1	0–2	0–1	0–0	0–4	1–3	1–0	

Source: BDFútbol
Legend: Blue = home team win; Yellow = draw; Red = away team win.

== Promotion playoff ==
Pos	Team	Pld	W	D	L	GF	GA	GD	Pts	Promotion
1	Hércules FC	10	6	2	2	22	9	+13	14	Promoted to Primera División
2	CA Osasuna	10	6	1	3	21	13	+8	13	Promoted to Primera División
3	Celta de Vigo	10	6	0	4	19	18	+1	12	
4	Murcia FC	10	5	1	4	16	15	+1	11	
5	CS Sabadell FC	10	4	0	6	15	20	−5	8	
6	Club Valladolid Deportivo	10	1	0	9	11	29	−18	2	

Source: Resultados Fútbol

=== Results ===
Home \ Away	CEL	HÉR	MUR	OSA	SAB	VLL
Celta de Vigo		2–1	2–1	3–1	6–1	
Hércules CF	1–0			3–0	4–0	4–1
Murcia FC	3–0			2–0	4–2	1–0
CA Osasuna	3–0	3–3	3–0			6–1
CS Sabadell FC	3–0	1–0	1–2			5–0
Valladolid Deportivo		1–3	4–2	0–1	0–1	

Source: Resultados Fútbol
Legend: Blue = home team win; Yellow = draw; Red = away team win.
