= CD Nacional de Madrid =

CD Nacional
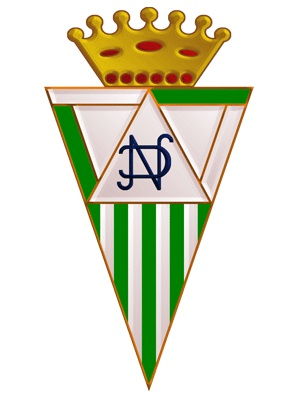
- Full name: Club Deportivo Nacional
- Founded: 1924
- Dissolved: 1939
- Ground: El Parral, Madrid, Spain
- Capacity: 12,000
- Chairman: ?
- Manager: ?
Home colours	Away colours

Club Deportivo Nacional de Madrid was a Spanish football team based in Madrid, Spain. They were founded in 1924 and dissolved in 1939, playing for seven seasons in total.

== History ==
=== Club names ===
- C.D. Madrid (1933–1934)
- C.D. Nacional (1924–1933) (1934–1936)

== Honours ==
- Campeonato Regional Centro:
  - Runners-up (1): 1931–32
- Copa Federación Centro
  - Winners (1): 1933–34

== Season to season ==
Season	Tier	Division	Place	Copa del Rey
1929–30	3	3ª	2nd	
1930–31	3	3ª	5th	
1931–32	3	3ª	1st	
1932–33	3	3ª	2nd	
1933–34	3	3ª	6th	
1934–35	2	2ª	5th	
1935–36	2	2ª	6th	

- 2 season in the Segunda División
- 5 season in the Tercera División
