= Segunda División =

Spanish association football league

LaLiga HyperMotion
- Organising body: Liga Nacional de Fútbol Profesional
- Founded: 1929; 97 years ago
- Country: Spain
- Other club from: Andorra
- Confederation: UEFA
- President: Javier Tebas
- Number of clubs: 22
- Level on pyramid: 2
- Promotion to: Primera División
- Relegation to: Tercera División (1929–1977); Segunda División B (1977–2021); Primera Federación (2021–present)
- Domestic cup: Copa del Rey
- International cup: UEFA Europa League (via Copa del Rey)
- Current champions: Racing Santander (3rd title) (2025–26)
- Most championships: Real Murcia (8 titles)
- Broadcasters: LaLiga TV Hypermotion #Vamos por Movistar Plus+
- Sponsor: EA Sports FC
- Website: laliga.com
- Current: 2026–27 Segunda División

The Campeonato Nacional de Liga de Segunda División, (Note: Spanish: [kampeoˈnato naθjoˈnal de ˈliɣa ðe seˈɣunda ðiβiˈsjon]; "Second Division National League Championship") commonly known as Segunda División or La Liga 2, and officially known as LaLiga HyperMotion (Note: Stylized in all caps. "HyperMotion" here refers to the HyperMotion Technology used in the EA Sports FC (formerly FIFA) video game series since 2021. Since 2023, an outlined "V" is incorporated in the logo, referring to the newly-revamped HyperMotion V iteration used since 2023.) for sponsorship reasons, is the men's second professional association football division of the Spanish football league system. Administered by Liga Nacional de Fútbol Profesional, it is contested by 22 teams, with the top two teams plus the winner of a play-off promoted to La Liga and replaced by the three lowest-placed teams in that division.

== History ==
The Second Division National Championship was inaugurated concurrently with the First Division, during the 1928–29 season. This setup comprised twenty teams divided into two groups: A and B. Group A functioned as the secondary national level, where the leading team would contest promotion to the First Division and the bottom two faced relegation to the Third Division. Conversely, Group B represented the third tier, wherein two teams were promoted to the Second Division, while the remaining eight joined the newly formed Third Division in the subsequent season.

For this inaugural season, Group A consisted of the following clubs: Sevilla F. C., Iberia S. C., Deportivo Alavés, Real Sporting de Gijón, Valencia F. C., Real Betis Balompié, Real Oviedo F. C., Real Club Celta, R. C. Deportivo de La Coruña, and Racing Club de Madrid. On the other hand, Group B featured Cultural y Deportiva Leonesa, Real Murcia F. C., C. D. Castellón, C. D. Torrelavega, Zaragoza C. D., Real Valladolid Deportivo, C. A. Osasuna, Tolosa F. C., Barakaldo F. C., and Cartagena F. C.

The structure and number of teams in the competition have evolved over time. In the 1934–35 season, the league was segmented into multiple groups. This format persisted until the 1968–69 season when it transitioned back to the singular group system that is in place today. From 1977 to 1984, when its management transitioned to the National Professional Football League, the tournament was referred to as Second Division A, after the introduction of the Second Division B as the third level in the national football hierarchy.

During the 2019–20 season, a global outbreak of severe acute respiratory syndrome coronavirus-2 emerged, which had originated in Asia and spread to Europe. As the virus rapidly spread across the continent, leading to rising infections and fatalities, sports entities began implementing preventative measures. In Spain, to mitigate the spread, only one match was held behind closed doors, without spectators, yet the concern and rate of infections did not diminish, with several players and club executives testing positive. In light of the escalating situation, La Liga opted to halt all competitions temporarily, following a precedent set by UEFA, which had suspended both the UEFA Champions League and the UEFA Europa League. In a similar vein, Italy's CONI and FIGC put the Serie A on hold due to the same health concerns. After a period of lockdown which saw a decrease in the spread of the virus, the government allowed sporting competitions to recommence, culminating on July 20 as the remaining games were played, mirroring events in the First Division. Nonetheless, on the final matchday, multiple players from Club de Fútbol Fuenlabrada, S.A.D. were diagnosed with the virus. Consequently, their pivotal game against Real Club Deportivo de La Coruña, which was of great importance to the league standings, was delayed. This disruption impacted several clubs and the ensuing promotion playoffs.

=== Naming conventions ===
The 2006–07 and 2007–08 seasons marked the first instances when the championship adopted a commercial designation, being named "Liga BBVA" following a sponsorship agreement between the National Professional Football League and the bank of the same title. From the 2008–09 through to the 2015–16 seasons, the division was rebranded as "Liga Adelante" as the bank transitioned to sponsor the First Division. In the 2016–17 season, Banco Santander emerged as the primary sponsor, prompting the names "LaLiga 1|2|3" (with an enlarged "2" thus taking on the "LaLiga 2" moniker unsponsored). From the 2019–20 season onward, it became "LaLiga SmartBank". During the 2023–24 season, the new sponsor was introduced as EA Sports, resulting in the title "LaLiga Hypermotion".

=== Records ===
Real Murcia has participated in the Second Division for the most seasons, a total of 53, and has secured the championship title on eight occasions. They are followed by Sporting de Gijón with 52 seasons, Tenerife 48, Sabadell 44, Hércules CF, Levante UD 43, Deportivo de La Coruña, Real Oviedo, CD Castellón and Cádiz each with 42 seasons.

Sociedad Deportiva Eibar holds the record for consecutive seasons in the division, with 18 seasons running from 1987–88 to 2005–06.

Among all teams that have competed in this division, only six have never featured in lower divisions: Atlético de Madrid, Espanyol, Valencia, Sevilla, Real Sociedad, and Sporting de Gijón.

In the 2011–12 season, Deportivo de La Coruña set a new record by amassing 91 points, leading them to clinch the championship. The subsequent season, 2012–13, witnessed Elche as the first team to maintain the top position throughout all 42 matchdays.

== League format ==
The league contains 22 teams that play each other home and away for a 42-match season. Each year three teams are promoted to La Liga. The top two teams earn an automatic promotion. The third team to be promoted is the winner of a play-off between the teams that finished 3rd to 6th (reserve teams are not eligible for promotion). The play-offs comprise two-legged semi-finals followed by a two-legged final. The bottom four are relegated to Primera Federación.

== Clubs ==
=== Team changes ===
| Promoted from 2025–26 Primera Federación | Relegated from 2025–26 La Liga | Promoted to 2026–27 La Liga | Relegated to 2026–27 Primera Federación |
|---|---|---|---|
| Tenerife; Eldense; Sabadell; Celta Fortuna | Mallorca; Girona; Oviedo | Racing Santander; Deportivo A Coruña; Málaga | Mirandés; Huesca; Cultural Leonesa; Zaragoza |

=== Stadiums and locations ===
Location of teams in 2026–27 Segunda División
Location of teams in 2026–27 Segunda División (Canary Islands)

| Team | Location | Stadium | Capacity |
|---|---|---|---|
| Albacete | Albacete | Estadio Carlos Belmonte | 17,524 |
| Almería | Almería | UD Almería Stadium | 15,000 |
| Andorra | (Andorra) Encamp | Nou Estadi Encamp | 5,108 |
| Burgos | Burgos | Estadio El Plantío | 12,194 |
| Cádiz | Cádiz | Estadio Nuevo Mirandilla | 20,724 |
| Castellón | Castellón de la Plana | Estadio SkyFi Castàlia | 15,500 |
| Celta Fortuna | Vigo | Estadio ABANCA Balaídos | 24,870 |
| Ceuta | Ceuta | Estadio Alfonso Murube | 6,500 |
| Córdoba | Córdoba | Estadio Bahrain Victorious Nuevo Arcángel de Córdoba | 20,989 |
| Eibar | Eibar | Estadio Municipal de Ipurua | 8,164 |
| Eldense | Elda | Estadio Pepico Amat | 5,776 |
| Girona | Girona | Estadio Municipal de Montilivi | 14,624 |
| Granada | Granada | Estadio Nuevo Los Cármenes | 19,189 |
| Las Palmas | Las Palmas | Estadio Gran Canaria | 32,392 |
| Leganés | Leganés | Estadio Ontime Butarque | 12,450 |
| Mallorca | Palma | Estadi Mallorca Son Moix | 23,142 |
| Oviedo | Oviedo | Estadio Carlos Tartiere | 30,500 |
| Real Sociedad B | San Sebastián | Reale Arena | 39,500 |
| Sabadell | Sabadell | Nova Creu Alta | 11,908 |
| Sporting Gijón | Gijón | Estadio El Molinón-Enrique Castro "Quini" | 29,371 |
| Tenerife | Santa Cruz de Tenerife | Estadio Heliodoro Rodríguez López | 22,824 |
| Valladolid | Valladolid | Estadio Municipal José Zorrilla | 27,618 |

=== Seasons in Segunda División ===
There are 173 teams that have taken part in 96 Segunda División championships that were played from the 1929 season until the 2026–27 season. The teams in bold compete in the Segunda División currently. The teams in italics represent defunct teams. The year in parentheses represents the most recent year of participation at this level.

- **54** seasons: **Sporting Gijón** (2027)
- **53** seasons: Murcia (2014)
- **49** seasons: **Tenerife** (2027)
- **45** seasons: **Sabadell** (2027)
- **44** seasons: **Cádiz** (2027), **Castellón** (2027)
- **43** seasons: Hércules (2014), Deportivo A Coruña (2026), **Oviedo** (2027)
- **41** seasons: Elche (2025), Levante (2025)
- **39** seasons: Racing Santander (2026), **Valladolid** (2027)
- **38** seasons: Recreativo Huelva (2015), Rayo Vallecano (2021), Alavés (2023), **Mallorca** (2027)
- **37** seasons: Osasuna (2019), **Granada** (2027)
- **36** seasons: Racing Ferrol (2025), **Córdoba** (2027)
- **35** seasons: **Las Palmas** (2027)
- **34** seasons: Salamanca (2011)
- **33** seasons: Real Madrid Castilla (2014)
- **32** seasons: Celta Vigo (2012), **Eibar** (2027)
- **31** seasons: CD Málaga (1992)
- **30** seasons: Barakaldo (1981)
- **29** seasons: Zaragoza (2026), **Albacete** (2027)
- **28** seasons: Real Betis (2015)
- **25** seasons: Xerez (2013), **Girona** (2027)
- **24** seasons: Lleida (2006)
- **23** seasons: Barcelona Atlètic (2018)
- **22** seasons: Gimnàstic (2019)
- **21** seasons: Valencia Mestalla (1973), Numancia (2020)
- **20** seasons: Badajoz (2003)
- **19** seasons: **Almería** (2027), **Leganés** (2027)
- **18** seasons: Logroñés (2000)
- **17** seasons: Burgos (1936) (1982), Sestao Sport (1996)
- **16** seasons: Real Sociedad (2010), Jaén (2014), Cultural Leonesa (2026)
- **15** seasons: Terrassa (2005)
- **14** seasons: Badalona (1968), Bilbao Athletic (2016), Huesca (2026)
- **13** seasons: Indautxu (1969), Avilés Industrial (1992), Ourense (1999), Sevilla (2001), Extremadura (2002), Alcorcón (2024), **Ceuta** (2027)
- **12** seasons: Alcoyano (2012), Lugo (2023), Mirandés (2026)
- **11** seasons: Constància (1968), Sant Andreu (1977), Puertollano (1985), Atlético Madrileño (2000)
- **10** seasons: San Fernando (1964), Condal (1967), Real Unión (2010), Villarreal (2013), Ponferradina (2023), Málaga (2026)
- **9** seasons: Real Córdoba (1953), Algeciras (2004), Pontevedra (2005)
- **8** seasons: Xerez Club (1946), Gimnástica Torrelavega (1968), Langreo (1972), Cartagena FC (1988), Cartagena (2025), **Eldense** (2027)
- **7** seasons: SD Ceuta (1951), Caudal (1958), Figueres (1993), Mérida (2000), Toledo (2000), Compostela (2003), Poli Ejido (2008), Getafe (2017), **Burgos** (2027)
- **6** seasons: Arenas (1944), Cartagena CF (1952), Linense (1955), Atlético Tetuán (1956), Basconia (1963), Europa (1968), Getafe Deportivo (1982), Palamós (1995), Atlético Madrid (2002), Espanyol (2024)
- **5** seasons: La Felguera (1958), Ontinyent (1971), Linares (1984), Alicante (2009), Sevilla Atlético (2018), Villarreal B (2024), **Real Sociedad B** (2027)
- **4** seasons: Melilla (1943) (1954), Atlético Baleares (1963), Melilla CF (1966), Palencia (1984), Valencia (1987), Real Burgos (1994), Atlético Marbella (1996), Ciudad de Murcia (2007), **Andorra** (2027)
- **3** seasons: Iberia (1931), Ferroviaria (1943), Gimnástica Lucense (1952), Orensana (1952), UD Huesca (1953), España de Tánger (1956), L'Hospitalet (1966), Atlético Malagueño (2006), Reus (2019), Fuenlabrada (2022)
- **2** seasons: Júpiter (1936), Nacional de Madrid (1936), Erandio (1950), Atlético Almería (1960), Abarán (1965), Elche Ilicitano (1970), AD Almería (1982), Orihuela Deportiva (1991), Écija (1997), Lorca Deportiva (2002) (2007), Guadalajara (2013), Son Maresme (2016), Extremadura UD (2020), Ibiza (2023), Amorebieta (2024)
- **1** season: Racing Madrid (1929), La Plana (1935), Logroño (1935), Unión (1936), Burjassot (1940), EHA Tánger (1940), Granollers (1940), Imperio (1940), Murcia Imperial (1940), Oriamendi (1940), Arosa (1950), Cacereño (1953), Escoriaza (1954), Juvenil (1955), Puente Genil (1957), Villarrobledo (1962), Jerez Industrial (1969), Moscardó (1971), Ensidesa (1976), AgD Ceuta (1981), Lorca Deportiva (1969) (1985), Deportivo Aragón (1986), Alzira (1989), Mollerussa (1989), Mallorca B (1999), Universidad LPGC (2001), Vecindario (2007), Granada 74 (2008), UCAM Murcia (2017), Lorca FC (2018), Rayo Majadahonda (2019), UD Logroñés (2021), **Celta Fortuna** (2027)

== Segunda División seasons ==
| Season | Champions | Runners-up | Other Teams Promoted |
|---|---|---|---|
| 1929 | Sevilla (Note: Not promoted) | Iberia SC | |
| 1929–30 | Alavés | Sporting Gijón | |
| 1930–31 | Valencia | Sevilla | |
| 1931–32 | Real Betis | Oviedo | |
| 1932–33 | Oviedo | Atlético Madrid | |
| 1933–34 | Sevilla | Atlético Madrid | |
| 1934–35 | Hércules | Osasuna | |
| 1935–36 | Celta Vigo | Zaragoza | |
| 1939–40 | Murcia | Deportivo La Coruña | |
| 1940–41 | Granada | Real Sociedad | Castellón and Deportivo La Coruña |
| 1941–42 | Real Betis | Zaragoza | |
| 1942–43 | Sabadell | Real Sociedad | |
| 1943–44 | Sporting Gijón | Murcia | |
| 1944–45 | Alcoyano | Hércules | Celta Vigo |
| 1945–46 | Sabadell | Deportivo La Coruña | |
| 1946–47 | Alcoyano | Gimnàstic | Real Sociedad |
| 1947–48 | Valladolid | Deportivo La Coruña | |
| 1948–49 | Real Sociedad | Málaga | |
| Season | Northern Group Winner | Southern Group Winner | Other teams promoted |
| 1949–50 | Racing Santander | Alcoyano | Lleida and Murcia |
| 1950–51 | Sporting Gijón | Atlético Tetuán | Zaragoza and Las Palmas |
| 1951–52 | Oviedo | Málaga | |
| 1952–53 | Osasuna | Jaén | |
| 1953–54 | Alavés | Las Palmas | Hércules and Málaga |
| 1954–55 | Cultural Leonesa | Murcia | |
| 1955–56 | Osasuna | Jaén | Zaragoza and Condal |
| 1956–57 | Sporting Gijón | Granada | |
| 1957–58 | Oviedo | Real Betis | |
| 1958–59 | Elche | Valladolid | |
| 1959–60 | Racing Santander | Mallorca | |
| 1960–61 | Osasuna | Tenerife | |
| 1961–62 | Deportivo La Coruña | Córdoba | Valladolid and Málaga |
| 1962–63 | Pontevedra | Murcia | Levante and Espanyol |
| 1963–64 | Deportivo La Coruña | Las Palmas | |
| 1964–65 | Pontevedra | Mallorca | Sabadell and Málaga |
| 1965–66 | Deportivo La Coruña | Hércules | Granada |
| 1966–67 | Real Sociedad | Málaga | Real Betis |
| 1967–68 | Deportivo La Coruña | Granada | |
| Season | Champions | Runner-up | Other teams promoted |
| 1968–69 | Sevilla | Celta Vigo | Mallorca |
| 1969–70 | Sporting Gijón | Málaga | Espanyol |
| 1970–71 | Real Betis | Burgos (I) | Deportivo La Coruña and Córdoba |
| 1971–72 | Oviedo | Castellón | Zaragoza |
| 1972–73 | Murcia | Elche | Racing Santander |
| 1973–74 | Real Betis | Hércules | Salamanca |
| 1974–75 | Oviedo | Racing Santander | Sevilla |
| 1975–76 | Burgos (I) | Celta Vigo | Málaga |
| 1976–77 | Sporting Gijón | Cádiz | Rayo Vallecano |
| 1977–78 | Zaragoza | Recreativo | Celta Vigo |
| 1978–79 | AD Almería | Málaga | Real Betis |
| 1979–80 | Murcia | Valladolid | Osasuna |
| 1980–81 | Castellón | Cádiz | Racing Santander |
| 1981–82 | Celta Vigo | Salamanca | Málaga |
| 1982–83 | Murcia | Cádiz | Mallorca |
| 1983–84 | Castilla (Note: Not promoted due to being a reserve team from a La Liga side) | Bilbao Athletic | Hércules, Racing Santander and Elche |
| 1984–85 | Las Palmas | Cádiz | Celta Vigo |
| 1985–86 | Murcia | Sabadell | Mallorca |
| 1986–87 | Valencia | Logroñés | Celta Vigo |
| 1987–88 | Málaga | Elche | Oviedo |
| 1988–89 | Castellón | Rayo Vallecano | Mallorca and Tenerife |
| 1989–90 | Real Burgos | Real Betis | Espanyol |
| 1990–91 | Albacete | Deportivo La Coruña | |
| 1991–92 | Celta Vigo | Rayo Vallecano | |
| 1992–93 | Lleida | Valladolid | Racing Santander |
| 1993–94 | Espanyol | Real Betis | Compostela |
| 1994–95 | Mérida | Rayo Vallecano | Salamanca |
| 1995–96 | Hércules | Logroñés | Extremadura |
| 1996–97 | Mérida | Salamanca | Mallorca |
| 1997–98 | Alavés | Extremadura | Villarreal |
| 1998–99 | Málaga | Atlético Madrid B | Numancia, Sevilla and Rayo Vallecano |
| 1999–2000 | Las Palmas | Osasuna | Villarreal |
| 2000–01 | Sevilla | Real Betis | Tenerife |
| 2001–02 | Atlético Madrid | Racing Santander | Recreativo |
| 2002–03 | Murcia | Zaragoza | Albacete |
| 2003–04 | Levante | Numancia | Getafe |
| 2004–05 | Cádiz | Celta Vigo | Alavés |
| 2005–06 | Recreativo | Gimnàstic | Levante |
| 2006–07 | Valladolid | Almería | Murcia |
| 2007–08 | Numancia | Málaga | Sporting Gijón |
| 2008–09 | Xerez | Zaragoza | Tenerife |
| 2009–10 | Real Sociedad | Hércules | Levante |
| 2010–11 | Real Betis | Rayo Vallecano | Granada |
| 2011–12 | Deportivo La Coruña | Celta Vigo | Valladolid |
| 2012–13 | Elche | Villarreal | Almeria |
| 2013–14 | Eibar | Deportivo La Coruña | Córdoba |
| 2014–15 | Real Betis | Sporting Gijón | Las Palmas |
| 2015–16 | Alavés | Leganés | Osasuna |
| 2016–17 | Levante | Girona | Getafe |
| 2017–18 | Rayo Vallecano | Huesca | Valladolid |
| 2018–19 | Osasuna | Granada | Mallorca |
| 2019–20 | Huesca | Cádiz | Elche |
| 2020–21 | Espanyol | Mallorca | Rayo Vallecano |
| 2021–22 | Almería | Valladolid | Girona |
| 2022–23 | Granada | Las Palmas | Alavés |
| 2023–24 | Leganés | Valladolid | Espanyol |
| 2024–25 | Levante | Elche | Oviedo |
| 2025–26 | Racing Santander | Deportivo La Coruña | Málaga |

== Champions and promotions ==
Clubs in bold are competing in Segunda División as of the 2025–26 season. Clubs in italics no longer exist. Seasons in italics mean shared titles due to regionalisation (1949–1968).

| Club | Winners | Promotions | Winning years |
|---|---|---|---|
| Murcia | **8** | 11 | 1939–40, 1954–55, 1962–63, 1972–73, 1979–80, 1982–83, 1985–86, 2002–03 |
| Real Betis | 7 | 12 | 1931–32, 1941–42, 1957–58, 1970–71, 1973–74, 2010–11, 2014–15 |
| **Deportivo La Coruña** | 5 | 11 | 1961–62, 1963–64, 1965–66, 1967–68, 2011–12 |
| **Sporting Gijón** | 5 | 7 | 1943–44, 1950–51, 1956–57, 1969–70, 1976–77 |
| Oviedo | 5 | 6 | 1932–33, 1951–52, 1957–58, 1971–72, 1974–75 |
| **Málaga*** | 4 | **13** | 1951–52, 1966–67, 1987–88, 1998–99 |
| Alavés | 4 | 7 | 1929–30, 1953–54, 1997–98, 2015–16 |
| Osasuna | 4 | 7 | 1952–53, 1955–56, 1960–61, 2018–19 |
| **Las Palmas** | 4 | 6 | 1953–54, 1963–64, 1984–85, 1999–2000 |
| **Granada** | 4 | 6 | 1940–41, 1956–57, 1967–68, 2022–23 |
| Sevilla | 4 | 5 | 1929, 1933–34, 1968–69, 2000–01 |
| Celta Vigo | 3 | 11 | 1935–36, 1981–82, 1991–92 |
| **Valladolid** | 3 | 10 | 1947–48, 1958–59, 2006–07 |
| **Racing Santander** | 3 | 9 | 1949–50, 1959–60, 2025–26 |
| Hércules | 3 | 8 | 1934–35, 1965–66, 1995–96 |
| Levante | 3 | 6 | 2003–04, 2016–17, 2024–25 |
| Real Sociedad | 3 | 6 | 1948–49, 1966–67, 2009–10 |
| Alcoyano | 3 | 3 | 1944–45, 1946–47, 1949–50 |
| Mallorca | 2 | 7 | 1959–60, 1964–65 |
| Elche | 2 | 7 | 1958–59, 2012–13 |
| Espanyol | 2 | 6 | 1993–94, 2020–21 |
| **Castellón** | 2 | 4 | 1980–81, 1988–89 |
| Sabadell | 2 | 4 | 1942–43, 1945–46 |
| Mérida | 2 | 2 | 1994–95, 1996–97 |
| Valencia | 2 | 2 | 1930–31, 1986–87 |
| Pontevedra | 2 | 2 | 1962–63, 1964–65 |
| Jaén | 2 | 2 | 1952–53, 1955–56 |
| **Zaragoza** | 1 | 8 | 1977–78 |
| Rayo Vallecano | 1 | 7 | 2017–18 |
| **Cádiz** | 1 | 6 | 2004–05 |
| Tenerife | 1 | 4 | 1960–61 |
| **Almería** | 1 | 3 | 2021–22 |
| Numancia | 1 | 3 | 2007–08 |
| Recreativo | 1 | 3 | 2005–06 |
| **Córdoba** | 1 | 3 | 1961–62 |
| **Leganés** | 1 | 2 | 2023–24 |
| **Huesca** | 1 | 2 | 2019–20 |
| Atlético Madrid | 1 | 2 | 2001–02 |
| Lleida | 1 | 2 | 1992–93 |
| **Albacete** | 1 | 2 | 1990–91 |
| Burgos CF (I) | 1 | 2 | 1975–76 |
| **Eibar** | 1 | 1 | 2013–14 |
| Xerez | 1 | 1 | 2008–09 |
| Real Burgos | 1 | 1 | 1989–90 |
| AD Almería | 1 | 1 | 1978–79 |
| **Cultural Leonesa** | 1 | 1 | 1954–55 |
| Atlético Tetuán | 1 | 1 | 1950–51 |
| Castilla | 1 | n/a | 1983–84 |

*Championships won by Málaga CF (1/2) and CD Málaga (3/11)

== Media coverage ==
=== Spain ===
| Broadcaster | Summary | Ref. |
|---|---|---|
| LaLiga TV Hypermotion | 11 (all) matches per week, live. | |
| #Vamos por Movistar Plus+ | 2 matches per week, live. | |

== Top scorers by season ==
| Season | Player(s) | Goals | Club(s) |
|---|---|---|---|
| 1929 | (Spain) Campanal I | 28 | Sporting Gijón |
| 1929–30 | (Spain) Manuel Olivares | 23 | Alavés |
| 1930–31 | (Spain) Adolfo Suárez | 18 | Sporting Gijón |
| 1931–32 | (Spain) Isidro Lángara | 24 | Oviedo |
| 1932–33 | (Spain) Ramón Herrera | 33 | Sporting Gijón |
| 1933–34 | (Spain) Campanal I (2) | 28 | Sevilla |
| 1934–35 | (Spain) Nolete | 17 | Celta Vigo |
| 1935–36 | (Spain) Nolete (2) | 19 | Celta Vigo |
1936–1939: Cancelled due to Spanish Civil War
| 1939–40 | (Spain) Fernando Terán | 24 | Real Sociedad |
| 1940–41 | (Spain) Julio Elicegui (2) | 26 | Real Unión |
| 1941–42 | (Spain) José Mijares | 18 | Sporting Gijón |
| 1942–43 | (Spain) José Saras | 14 | Racing Santander |
| 1943–44 | (Spain) Juan Araujo | 21 | Xerez |
| 1944–45 | (Spain) Juan Araujo (2) | 22 | Xerez |
| 1945–46 | (Spain) José Saras (2) | 20 | Racing Santander |
| 1945–46 | (Spain) Mariano Uceda | 20 | Zaragoza |
| 1946–47 | (Spain) Francisco Peralta | 24 | Gimnàstic |
| 1947–48 | (Spain) José Serratusell | 31 | Badalona |
| 1948–49 | (Spain) Pedro Bazán | 26 | CD Málaga |
| 1949–50 | (Spain) Pío Alonso | 31 | Sporting Gijón |
| 1950–51 | (Spain) Paco Campos | 29 | Sporting Gijón |
| 1951–52 | (Spain) Pedro Bazán (2) | 25 | CD Málaga |
| 1952–53 | (Spain) Ángel Arregui | 30 | Jaén |
| 1953–54 | (Spain) Chas | 23 | Cultural Leonesa |
| 1954–55 | (Spain) Julito | 25 | Tenerife |
| 1955–56 | (Spain) Rafa Delgado | 25 | Granada |
| 1956–57 | (Spain) Ricardo Alós | 45 | Sporting Gijón |
| 1957–58 | (Spain) Chelo | 19 | Terrassa |
| 1957–58 | (Spain) Lalo | 19 | Oviedo |
| 1957–58 | (Spain) Jordi Vila | 19 | Real Betis |
| 1958–59 | (Honduras) José Cardona | 23 | Elche |
| 1959–60 | (Spain) José Paredes | 25 | Levante |
| 1960–61 | (Spain) José Luis Veloso | 26 | Deportivo La Coruña |
| 1961–62 | (Spain) Amancio | 25 | Deportivo La Coruña |
| 1962–63 | (Spain) José Miguel Olano | 31 | Real Sociedad |
| 1963–64 | (Spain) Abel Fernández | 26 | Racing Santander |
| 1964–65 | (Spain) José María Lizarralde | 20 | Indautxu |
| 1965–66 | (Spain) Abel Fernández (2) | 26 | Celta Vigo |
| 1966–67 | (Spain) Francisco Solabarietta | 24 | Sporting Gijón |
| 1967–68 | (Spain) Abel Fernández (3) | 17 | Celta Vigo |
| 1967–68 | (Spain) Cesàreo Rivera | 17 | Celta Vigo |
| 1968–69 | (Spain) Quino Sierra | 32 | Real Betis |
| 1969–70 | (Spain) Quini | 21 | Sporting Gijón |
| 1970–71 | (Spain) Santillana | 16 | Racing Santander |
| 1971–72 | (Spain) Enrique Galán | 23 | Oviedo |
| 1972–73 | (Spain) Antonio Illán | 19 | Rayo Vallecano |
| 1973–74 | (Spain) Paco Baena | 22 | Cádiz |
| 1974–75 | (Argentina) José Juan Cioffi | 22 | Castellón |
| 1975–76 | (Spain) Antonio Illán (2) | 22 | Tenerife |
| 1975–76 | (Spain) Antonio Burguete | 22 | Córdoba |
| 1976–77 | (Spain) Quini (2) | 27 | Sporting Gijón |
| 1977–78 | (Spain) Alfonso Castro | 24 | Deportivo La Coruña |
| 1978–79 | (Spain) Patxi Iriguíbel | 23 | Osasuna |
| 1979–80 | (Spain) Patxi Iriguíbel (2) | 19 | Osasuna |
| 1980–81 | (Spain) Enrique Magdaleno | 17 | Burgos |
| 1981–82 | (Spain) Pichi Lucas | 26 | Celta Vigo |
| 1982–83 | (Spain) José Luis Vara | 16 | Deportivo La Coruña |
| 1983–84 | (Spain) Julio Salinas | 23 | Bilbao Athletic |
| 1984–85 | (Spain) Salvador Mejías | 16 | Cádiz |
| 1985–86 | (Spain) Pedro Alcañiz | 23 | Castellón |
| 1986–87 | (Brazil) Baltazar | 34 | Celta Vigo |
| 1987–88 | (Spain) Carlos | 25 | Oviedo |
| 1988–89 | (Spain) Quique Estebaranz | 23 | Racing Santander |
| 1989–90 | (Spain) Pepe Mel | 22 | Real Betis |
| 1990–91 | (Argentina) Juan Ramón Comas | 23 | Murcia |
| 1991–92 | (Socialist Federal Republic of Yugoslavia) Vladimir Gudelj | 26 | Celta Vigo |
| 1992–93 | (Argentina) Daniel Aquino | 19 | Mérida |
| 1993–94 | (Argentina) Daniel Aquino (2) | 26 | Real Betis |
| 1994–95 | (Spain) Puche II | 21 | Palamós |
| 1995–96 | (Spain) Manel | 27 | CD Logroñés |
| 1996–97 | (Portugal) Pauleta | 19 | Salamanca |
| 1996–97 | (Spain) Yordi | 19 | Atlético Madrid B |
| 1997–98 | (Montenegro) Igor Gluščević | 24 | Extremadura |
| 1998–99 | (Brazil) Catanha | 25 | Málaga |
| 1998–99 | (Spain) Marcos Sequeiros | 25 | Atlético Madrid B |
| 1999–2000 | (Spain) Paco Salillas | 20 | Levante |
| 2000–01 | (Spain) Salva | 21 | Atlético Madrid |
| 2001–02 | (Uruguay) Diego Alonso | 22 | Atlético Madrid |
| 2002–03 | (Spain) Jesús Perera | 22 | Albacete |
| 2003–04 | (Spain) Rubén Castro | 22 | Las Palmas |
| 2004–05 | (Spain) Mario Bermejo | 25 | Racing Ferrol |
| 2005–06 | (Nigeria) Ikechukwu Uche | 20 | Recreativo Huelva |
| 2006–07 | (Spain) Marcos Márquez | 21 | Las Palmas |
| 2007–08 | (Spain) Yordi (2) | 20 | Xerez |
| 2008–09 | (Spain) Nino | 29 | Tenerife |
| 2009–10 | (Spain) Jorge Molina | 26 | Elche |
| 2010–11 | (Spain) Jonathan Soriano | 32 | Barcelona B |
| 2011–12 | (Argentina) Leonardo Ulloa | 28 | Almería |
| 2012–13 | (Brazil) Charles | 27 | Almería |
| 2013–14 | (Spain) Borja Viguera | 25 | Alavés |
| 2014–15 | (Spain) Rubén Castro (2) | 31 | Real Betis |
| 2015–16 | (Spain) Sergio León | 22 | Elche |
| 2016–17 | (Spain) Joselu | 23 | Lugo |
| 2017–18 | (Spain) Jaime Mata | 33 | Valladolid |
| 2018–19 | (Spain) Álvaro | 20 | Almería |
| 2019–20 | (Uruguay) Cristhian Stuani | 29 | Girona |
| 2020–21 | (Spain) Raúl de Tomás | 23 | Espanyol |
| 2021–22 | (Spain) Borja Bastón | 22 | Oviedo |
| 2021–22 | (Uruguay) Cristhian Stuani (2) | 22 | Girona |
| 2022–23 | (Albania) Myrto Uzuni | 23 | Granada |
| 2023–24 | (Denmark) Martin Braithwaite | 22 | Espanyol |
| 2024–25 | (Colombia) Luis Suárez | 27 | Almería |

== Sponsorship names for seasons ==
- Liga BBVA (2006–2008)
- Liga Adelante (2008–2016)
- LaLiga 1|2|3 (2016–2019)
- LaLiga SmartBank (2019–2023)
- LaLiga Hypermotion (2023–present)

== See also ==
- List of La Liga broadcasters
- List of foreign Segunda División players
