= 1941–42 Segunda División =

11th season of the second-tier football league in Spain

Segunda División
- Season: 1941–42
- Champions: Real Betis
- Promoted: Real Betis; Real Zaragoza
- Relegated: Real Unión; Levante-Gimnástico; Cartagena CF
- Matches: 168
- Goals: 655 (3.9 per match)
- Top goalscorer: José Mijares (18 goals)
- Best goalkeeper: Ricardo Pujol (0.81 goals/match)
- Biggest home win: Cádiz 7–0 Cartagena (19 October 1941); Real Gijón 8–1 Real Unión (2 November 1941); Osasuna 7–0 Levante-Gimnástico (16 November 1941)
- Biggest away win: Levante-Gimnástico 0–4 Ferroviaria (26 October 1941)
- Highest scoring: Jerez 8–5 Cartagena (9 November 1941)

The 1941–42 Segunda División season saw 24 teams participate in the second flight Spanish league. Betis and Zaragoza was promoted to Primera División. Real Unión, Levante and Cartagena were relegated to Divisiones Regionales de Fútbol.

== Overview before the season ==
24 teams joined the league, including two relegated from the 1940–41 La Liga and 5 promoted from Divisiones Regionales.

Relegated from La Liga

- Zaragoza
- Murcia

Promoted from Divisiones Regionales

- Alavés
- Constancia
- Ferroviaria
- Ceuta
- Elche

== Group 1 ==
=== Teams ===
Location of teams in Segunda División 1941-42 G-1

Club	City	Stadium
Arenas Club	Guecho	Ibaiondo
Baracaldo-Oriamendi	Baracaldo	Lasesarre
Club Ferrol	Ferrol	Inferniño
Real Gijón	Gijón	El Molinón
Real Unión Club	Irun	Stadium Gal
UD Salamanca	Salamanca	El Calvario
Real Santander SD	Santander	El Sardinero
Real Valladolid Deportivo	Valladolid	José Zorrilla

=== League table ===
Pos	Team	Pld	W	D	L	GF	GA	GD	Pts	Qualification or relegation
1	Real Gijón	14	8	4	2	37	23	+14	20	Qualification for the promotion playoffs
2	Salamanca	14	9	0	5	31	25	+6	18	Qualification for the promotion playoffs
3	Ferrol	14	7	3	4	34	20	+14	17	Qualification for the relegation playoffs
4	Real Santander	14	5	5	4	26	26	0	15	Qualification for the relegation playoffs
5	Real Valladolid	14	6	2	6	32	21	+11	14 (Note: Valladolid finished ahead of Baracaldo-Oriamendi on head-to-head goal difference: Baracaldo–Valladolid 1–0, Valladolid–Baracaldo 3–1)	Qualification for the relegation playoffs
6	Baracaldo-Oriamendi	14	6	2	6	32	29	+3	14	Qualification for the relegation playoffs
7	Arenas	14	5	0	9	24	38	−14	10	Qualification for the relegation playoffs
8	Real Unión (R)	14	1	2	11	16	50	−34	4	Qualification for the relegation playoffs

Source: BDFútbol
Rules for classification: 1) points; 2) head-to-head points; 3) head-to-head goal difference; 4) goal difference; 5) number of goals scored
(R) Relegated

=== Results ===
Home \ Away	ARE	BAR	FER	SPO	RAC	RUN	SAL	VLL
Arenas	—	2–1	2–1	1–2	3–1	4–3	2–3	1–4
Baracaldo-Oriamendi	4–1	—	3–4	3–3	3–2	6–1	4–1	1–0
Ferrol	3–1	3–0	—	6–1	5–0	5–1	3–1	1–1
Real Gijón	5–1	2–0	3–2	—	3–3	8–1	3–1	2–1
Real Santander	3–2	2–2	0–0	2–2	—	3–0	3–0	1–0
Real Unión	2–3	2–3	0–0	1–0	2–2	—	1–2	1–4
Salamanca	2–0	3–1	3–1	0–2	3–1	5–0	—	4–3
Real Valladolid	4–1	3–1	4–0	1–1	1–3	5–1	1–3	—

Source: BDFútbol
Legend: Blue = home team win; Yellow = draw; Red = away team win.

=== Top goalscorers ===
Goalscorers	Goals	Team
(Spain) José Mijares	18	Real Gijón
(Spain) Pruden	16	Salamanca
(Portugal) Portugués	12	Ferrol
(Spain) Ildefonso Sañudo	12	Valladolid
(Spain) Martín Aroma	9	Arenas

=== Top goalkeepers ===
Goalkeeper	Goals	Matches	Average	Team
(Spain) Moreno	16	12	1.33	Ferrol
(Spain) Manuel Joven	19	12	1.58	Salamanca
(Spain) Pablito	19	11	1.73	Real Gijón
(Spain) Joaquín Caller	24	13	1.85	Real Santander
(Spain) José María Busto	24	12	2	Baracaldo

== Group 2 ==
=== Teams ===
Location of teams in Segunda División 1941-42 G-2

Club	City	Stadium
Deportivo Alavés	Vitoria	Mendizorroza
CD Constancia	Inca	Camp d’Es Cos
AD Ferroviaria	Madrid	Campo de Delicias
Gerona CF	Gerona	Vista Alegre
UD Levante-Gimnástico	Valencia	Vallejo
CA Osasuna	Pamplona	San Juan
Real Sociedad	San Sebastián	Atocha
CD Sabadell FC	Sabadell	Cruz Alta

=== League table ===
Pos	Team	Pld	W	D	L	GF	GA	GD	Pts	Qualification or relegation
1	Sabadell	14	6	7	1	26	13	+13	19	Qualification for the promotion playoffs
2	Real Zaragoza (O, P)	14	6	4	4	30	26	+4	16 (Note: Zaragoza finished ahead of Alavés on overall average: Zaragoza 1.15, Alavés 1.14)	Qualification for the promotion playoffs
3	Alavés	14	7	2	5	32	28	+4	16	Qualification for the relegation playoffs
4	Constancia	14	5	5	4	28	18	+10	15 (Note: Constancia finished ahead of Gerona on head-to-head points: Gerona–Constancia 0–3, Constancia–Gerona 1–1)	Qualification for the relegation playoffs
5	Gerona	14	6	3	5	24	20	+4	15	Qualification for the relegation playoffs
6	Osasuna	14	5	3	6	29	24	+5	13	Qualification for the relegation playoffs
7	Ferroviaria	14	5	2	7	18	23	−5	12	Qualification for the relegation playoffs
8	Levante-Gimnástico (R)	14	2	2	10	17	52	−35	6	Qualification for the relegation playoffs

Source: BDFútbol
Rules for classification: 1) points; 2) head-to-head points; 3) head-to-head goal difference; 4) goal difference; 5) number of goals scored
(O) Play-off winners; (P) Promoted; (R) Relegated

=== Results ===
Home \ Away	ALA	CON	FER	GIR	LEV	OSA	SAB	ZAR
Alavés	—	2–2	3–0	1–0	7–1	3–1	2–1	2–0
Constancia	3–0	—	1–0	1–1	6–1	2–2	1–2	5–1
Ferroviaria	2–3	2–1	—	1–0	2–1	3–1	0–2	1–1
Gerona	2–1	0–3	4–1	—	6–2	0–2	0–1	3–2
Levante-Gimnástico	4–2	0–0	0–4	1–2	—	4–2	1–1	1–3
Osasuna	6–2	3–2	2–0	1–3	7–0	—	1–1	0–0
Sabadell	1–1	1–1	1–1	1–1	6–0	2–0	—	4–2
Real Zaragoza	5–3	3–0	3–1	2–2	4–1	2–1	2–2	—

Source: BDFútbol
Legend: Blue = home team win; Yellow = draw; Red = away team win.

=== Top goalscorers ===
Goalscorers	Goals	Team
(Spain) Carlos Sanz	16	Constancia
(Spain) Miguel Gual	12	Sabadell
(Spain) Vicente Martínez	10	Zaragoza
(Spain) Totó	9	Alavés
(Spain) Florentino Zubizarreta	7	Alavés

=== Top goalkeepers ===
Goalkeeper	Goals	Matches	Average	Team
(Spain) Ricardo Pujol	9	11	0.82	Sabadell
(Spain) Andrés Company	18	14	1.29	Constancia
(Spain) José Francàs	20	14	1.43	Gerona
(Spain) Jesús Ederra	18	11	1.64	Osasuna
(Spain) José Valero	20	12	1.67	Zaragoza

== Group 3 ==
=== Teams ===
Location of teams in Segunda División 1941-42 G-3

Club	City	Stadium
Real Betis Balompié	Seville	Heliópolis
Cádiz CF	Cádiz	La Mirandilla
Cartagena CF	Cartagena	El Almarjal
SD Ceuta	Ceuta	Campo de Deportes
Elche CF	Elche	Altabix
CD Málaga	Málaga	La Rosaleda
Real Murcia	Murcia	Estadio de La Condomina
Xerez Club	Jerez de la Frontera	Domecq

=== League table ===
Pos	Team	Pld	W	D	L	GF	GA	GD	Pts	Qualification or relegation
1	Real Betis (O, P)	14	8	4	2	39	22	+17	20	Qualification for the promotion playoffs
2	Real Murcia	14	8	1	5	37	28	+9	17	Qualification for the promotion playoffs
3	Cádiz	14	7	2	5	30	19	+11	16	Qualification for the relegation playoffs
4	CD Málaga	14	5	4	5	19	21	−2	14 (Note: Málaga finished ahead of Ceuta on head-to-head points: Málaga–Ceuta 5–0, Ceuta–Málaga 0–1)	Qualification for the relegation playoffs
5	Ceuta	14	5	4	5	27	19	+8	14	Qualification for the relegation playoffs
6	Elche	14	4	3	7	23	35	−12	11	Qualification for the relegation playoffs
7	Xerez Club	14	3	4	7	25	36	−11	10 (Note: Jerez finished ahead of Cartagena on head-to-head points: Jerez–Cartagena 8–5, Cartagena–Jerez 2–2)	Qualification for the relegation playoffs
8	Cartagena CF (R)	14	3	4	7	19	39	−20	10	Qualification for the relegation playoffs

Source: BDFútbol
Rules for classification: 1) points; 2) head-to-head points; 3) head-to-head goal difference; 4) goal difference; 5) number of goals scored
(O) Play-off winners; (P) Promoted; (R) Relegated

=== Top goalscorers ===
Goalscorers	Goals	Team
(Spain) José Vilanova	14	Murcia
(Spain) Paquirri	13	Real Betis
(Spain) Saro	10	Real Betis
(Spain) Tavilo	9	Ceuta
(Spain) Manuel Olivares	8	CD Málaga

=== Top goalkeepers ===
Goalkeeper	Goals	Matches	Average	Team
(Spain) Joaquín Comas	12	12	1	Ceuta
(Spain) Ramón Mendaro	21	14	1.5	CD Málaga
(Spain) Francisco Suárez	19	12	1.58	Murcia
(Spain) Paquillo	21	13	1.62	Real Betis
(Spain) Francisco Larios	27	11	2.45	Xerez Club

== Promotion playoffs ==
=== First round ===
==== League table ====
Pos	Team	Pld	W	D	L	GF	GA	GD	Pts	Qualification or relegation
1	Real Betis (C, P)	10	7	1	2	21	17	+4	15	Promotion to La Liga
2	Real Zaragoza (P)	10	6	1	3	19	13	+6	13	Promotion to La Liga
3	Real Murcia	10	6	0	4	17	11	+6	12	Qualification for the second round
4	Sabadell	10	3	3	4	16	22	−6	9	Qualification for the second round
5	Real Gijón	10	3	2	5	25	19	+6	8	
6	Salamanca	10	1	1	8	8	24	−16	3	

Source: BDFútbol
Rules for classification: 1) points; 2) head-to-head points; 3) head-to-head goal difference; 4) goal difference; 5) number of goals scored
(C) Champions; (P) Promoted

=== Second round ===
4 June 1942	Oviedo	3–1	Sabadell	Madrid
	Soladrero 56', 74'; Goyín 81'	Report	Polo 88'	Stadium: Chamartín; Referee: Escartín

28 June 1942	Barcelona	5–1	Murcia	Madrid
	Martín 28', 61', 72', 77'; Sospedra 89'	Report	Huguet 23'	Stadium: Chamartín; Referee: Escartín

== Relegation playoffs ==
=== Group 1 ===
==== League table ====
Pos	Team	Pld	W	D	L	GF	GA	GD	Pts
1	Cultural Leonesa (P)	10	5	2	3	24	18	+6	12
2	Real Valladolid	10	6	0	4	19	15	+4	12
3	Real Santander	10	5	1	4	26	13	+13	11
4	Ferrol	10	5	1	4	23	19	+4	11
5	Coruña	10	4	0	6	25	26	−1	8
6	Langreano	10	3	0	7	13	39	−26	6

Source: Arquero
Rules for classification: 1) points; 2) head-to-head points; 3) head-to-head goal difference; 4) goal difference; 5) number of goals scored
(P) Promoted

=== Group 2 ===
==== League table ====
Pos	Team	Pld	W	D	L	GF	GA	GD	Pts
1	Arenas	10	8	1	1	31	4	+27	17
2	Logroñés	10	6	1	3	24	17	+7	13
3	Baracaldo-Oriamendi	10	6	1	3	22	16	+6	13
4	Rayo Cantabria	10	4	1	5	20	20	0	9
5	Indauchu	10	2	0	8	20	36	−16	4
6	Real Unión (R)	10	2	0	8	8	32	−24	4

Source: Arquero
Rules for classification: 1) points; 2) head-to-head points; 3) head-to-head goal difference; 4) goal difference; 5) number of goals scored
(R) Relegated

=== Group 3 ===
==== League table ====
Pos	Team	Pld	W	D	L	GF	GA	GD	Pts
1	Osasuna	10	8	1	1	33	10	+23	17
2	Ferroviaria	10	5	3	2	19	12	+7	13
3	Alavés	10	4	2	4	26	21	+5	10
4	Imperio Madrid	10	4	2	4	18	19	−1	10
5	Tudelano	10	3	1	6	16	31	−15	7
6	Atlético Zaragoza	10	1	1	8	10	29	−19	3

Source: Arquero
Rules for classification: 1) points; 2) head-to-head points; 3) head-to-head goal difference; 4) goal difference; 5) number of goals scored

=== Group 4 ===
==== League table ====
Pos	Team	Pld	W	D	L	GF	GA	GD	Pts
1	Tarrasa (P)	10	6	3	1	24	7	+17	15
2	Levante-Gimnástico (R)	10	5	2	3	23	20	+3	12
3	Mallorca	10	4	2	4	20	17	+3	10
4	Constancia	10	4	2	4	19	19	0	10
5	Gerona	10	3	1	6	18	23	−5	7
6	Martinenc	10	3	0	7	10	28	−18	6

Source: Arquero
Rules for classification: 1) points; 2) head-to-head points; 3) head-to-head goal difference; 4) goal difference; 5) number of goals scored
(P) Promoted; (R) Relegated

=== Group 5 ===
==== League table ====
Pos	Team	Pld	W	D	L	GF	GA	GD	Pts
1	CD Málaga	10	6	3	1	22	17	+5	15
2	Elche	10	5	2	3	24	13	+11	12
3	Alcoyano (P)	10	5	1	4	17	13	+4	11
4	Eldense	10	5	1	4	22	20	+2	11
5	Cartagena CF (R)	10	2	2	6	11	21	−10	6
6	CD Córdoba	10	2	1	7	11	23	−12	5

Source: Arquero
Rules for classification: 1) points; 2) head-to-head points; 3) head-to-head goal difference; 4) goal difference; 5) number of goals scored
(P) Promoted; (R) Relegated

=== Group 6 ===
==== League table ====
Pos	Team	Pld	W	D	L	GF	GA	GD	Pts
1	Ceuta	10	8	1	1	26	7	+19	17
2	Xerez Club	10	7	1	2	27	15	+12	15
3	Recreativo	10	4	1	5	21	22	−1	9
4	Cádiz	10	3	2	5	20	21	−1	8
5	Atlético Tetuán	10	3	0	7	13	24	−11	6
6	Badajoz	10	2	1	7	11	29	−18	5

Source: Arquero
Rules for classification: 1) points; 2) head-to-head points; 3) head-to-head goal difference; 4) goal difference; 5) number of goals scored
