= 1942–43 Segunda División =

12th season of the second-tier football league in Spain

Segunda División
- Season: 1942–43
- Champions: Sabadell
- Promoted: Sabadell; Real Sociedad
- Relegated: Tarrasa; Málaga; Ferrol; Gerona; Elche; Real Santander; Ferroviaria; Cádiz; Salamanca; Alavés
- Matches: 168
- Goals: 586 (3.49 per match)
- Top goalscorer: José Saras (14 goals)
- Best goalkeeper: Andrés Company (0.79 goals/match)
- Biggest home win: Real Gijón 7–1 Baracaldo (4 October 1942); Constancia 6–0 Alavés (11 October 1942); Real Sociedad 8–2 Sabadell (11 October 1942); Real Sociedad 7–1 Tarrasa (8 November 1942)
- Biggest away win: Ferroviaria 0–8 Real Sociedad (18 October 1942)
- Highest scoring: Real Sociedad 8–2 Sabadell (11 October 1942)

== Overview before the season ==
24 teams joined the league, including two relegated from the 1941–42 La Liga and 3 promoted from Divisiones Regionales.

Relegated from La Liga

- Hércules
- Real Sociedad

Promoted from Divisiones Regionales

- Cultural Leonesa
- Tarrasa
- Alcoyano

== Group 1 ==
=== Teams ===
Location of teams in Segunda División 1942-43 G-1

Club	City	Stadium
Arenas Club	Guecho	Ibaiondo
Baracaldo	Baracaldo	Lasesarre
Cultural y Deportiva Leonesa	León	La Corredera
Club Ferrol	Ferrol	Inferniño
Real Gijón	Gijón	El Molinón
UD Salamanca	Salamanca	El Calvario
Real Santander SD	Santander	El Sardinero
Real Valladolid Deportivo	Valladolid	José Zorrilla

=== League table ===
Pos	Team	Pld	W	D	L	GF	GA	GD	Pts	Qualification or relegation
1	Real Gijón	14	9	1	4	34	23	+11	19 (Note: Real Gijón finished ahead of Valladolid on head-to-head points: Valladolid–Real Gijón 0–0, Real Gijón–Valladolid 2–0)	Qualification for the promotion playoffs
2	Real Valladolid	14	6	7	1	27	17	+10	19	Qualification for the promotion playoffs
3	Cultural Leonesa	14	7	4	3	30	19	+11	18	
4	Arenas	14	4	5	5	18	21	−3	13 (Note: Arenas finished ahead of Baracaldo on head-to-head points: Arenas–Baracaldo 2–1, Baracaldo–Arenas 0–0)	
5	Baracaldo	14	4	5	5	29	30	−1	13	Qualification for the relegation playoffs
6	Ferrol (R)	14	4	3	7	28	33	−5	11 (Note: Ferrol finished ahead of Real Santander on head-to-head goal difference: Real Santander–Ferrol 3–2, Ferrol–Real Santander 5–1)	Qualification for the relegation playoffs
7	Real Santander (R)	14	3	5	6	29	35	−6	11	Qualification for the relegation playoffs
8	Salamanca (R)	14	3	2	9	19	36	−17	8	Qualification for the relegation playoffs

Source: BDFútbol
Rules for classification: 1) points; 2) head-to-head points; 3) head-to-head goal difference; 4) goal difference; 5) number of goals scored
(R) Relegated

=== Results ===
Home \ Away	ARE	BAR	CUL	FER	GIJ	SAL	SAN	VAL
Arenas Club		2–2	1–2	3–2	3–2	1–2	2–2	0–2
Baracaldo-Oriamendi	0–2		2–2	6–2	1–2	3–2	4–2	3–2
Cultural Leonesa	1–2	4–2		3–2	4–2	4–2	3–2	2–2
Club Ferrol	2–2	2–2	1–2		4–2	5–2	5–2	2–2
Real Gijón CF	1–2	7–2	4–2	5–2		3–2	1–2	2–2
UD Salamanca	4–2	3–2	1–2	1–2	2–2		4–2	1–2
Real Santander SD	3–2	2–2	2–2	3–2	4–2	5–2		2–2
Real Valladolid	2–2	2–2	0–2	1–2	0–2	2–2	3–2	

Legend: Blue = home team win; Yellow = draw; Red = away team win.

=== Top goalscorers ===
Goalscorers	Goals	Team
(Spain) José Saras	14	Real Santander
(Spain) Pruden	11	Salamanca
(Spain) Chipía	10	Real Gijón
(Spain) Ildefonso Sañudo	10	Valladolid
(Spain) Constante Carnero	10	Ferrol

=== Top goalkeepers ===
Goalkeeper	Goals	Matches	Average	Team
(Spain) José Luis Izpizua	17	14	1.21	Valladolid
(Spain) José Antonio Barrie	16	11	1.45	Arenas
(Spain) Gregorio Leicea	23	14	1.64	Real Gijón
(Spain) Fernando Llorente	30	14	2.14	Baracaldo
(Spain) Moreno	33	14	2.36	Ferrol

== Group 2 ==
=== Teams ===
Location of teams in Segunda División 1942-43 G-2

Club	City	Stadium
Deportivo Alavés	Vitoria	Mendizorroza
CD Constancia	Inca	Camp d’Es Cos
AD Ferroviaria	Madrid	Campo de Delicias
Gerona CF	Gerona	Vista Alegre
CA Osasuna	Pamplona	San Juan
Real Sociedad	San Sebastián	Atocha
CD Sabadell FC	Sabadell	Cruz Alta
CD Tarrasa	Tarrasa	Pi i Margall

=== League table ===
Pos	Team	Pld	W	D	L	GF	GA	GD	Pts	Qualification or relegation
1	Real Sociedad (O, P)	14	11	1	2	46	16	+30	23	Qualification for the promotion playoffs
2	Sabadell (O, P)	14	7	4	3	26	20	+6	18 (Note: Sabadell finished ahead of Constancia on head-to-head points: Sabadell–Constancia 1–0, Constancia–Sabadell 0–1)	Qualification for the promotion playoffs
3	Constancia	14	8	2	4	24	11	+13	18	
4	Osasuna	14	6	3	5	23	27	−4	15	
5	Tarrasa (R)	14	5	2	7	25	32	−7	12	Qualification for the relegation playoffs
6	Gerona (R)	14	4	3	7	22	24	−2	11	Qualification for the relegation playoffs
7	Ferroviaria (R)	14	3	4	7	19	31	−12	10	Qualification for the relegation playoffs
8	Alavés (R)	14	1	3	10	9	33	−24	5	Qualification for the relegation playoffs

Source: BDFútbol
Rules for classification: 1) points; 2) head-to-head points; 3) head-to-head goal difference; 4) goal difference; 5) number of goals scored
(O) Play-off winners; (P) Promoted; (R) Relegated

=== Results ===
Home \ Away	ALA	CON	FER	GER	OSA	REA	SAB	TAR
CD Alavés		2–2	1–2	2–2	1–2	0–2	1–2	0–2
CD Constancia	6–2		2–2	2–2	3–2	1–2	0–2	2–2
AD Ferroviaria	2–2	1–2		3–2	2–2	0–2	0–2	2–2
Gerona CF	4–2	1–2	3–2		0–2	1–2	3–2	4–2
Osasuna	1–2	1–2	2–2	5–2		3–2	1–2	3–2
Real Sociedad	5–2	1–2	2–2	1–2	2–2		8–2	7–2
CD Sabadell CF	1–2	1–2	2–2	2–2	5–2	3–2		1–2
CD Tarrasa	3–2	1–2	4–2	0–2	3–2	2–2	2–2	

Legend: Blue = home team win; Yellow = draw; Red = away team win.

=== Top goalscorers ===
Goalscorers	Goals	Team
(Spain) Sebastián Ontoria	13	Real Sociedad
(Spain) Vicente Unamuno	13	Real Sociedad
(Spain) Pedrín	8	Real Sociedad
(Spain) Julián Vergara	8	Osasuna
(Spain) Blai	8	Tarrasa

=== Top goalkeepers ===
Goalkeeper	Goals	Matches	Average	Team
(Spain) Andrés Company	11	14	0.79	Constancia
(Spain) Eduardo Chillida	11	11	1	Real Sociedad
(Spain) José Francàs	24	14	1.71	Gerona
(Spain) Ricardo Pujol	19	11	1.73	Sabadell
(Spain) Miguel Bermejo	21	12	1.75	Ferroviaria

== Group 3 ==
=== Teams ===
Location of teams in Segunda División 1942-43 G-3

Club	City	Stadium
CD Alcoyano	Alcoy	El Collao
Cádiz CF	Cádiz	La Mirandilla
SD Ceuta	Ceuta	Campo de Deportes
Elche CF	Elche	Altabix
Hércules CF	Alicante	La Viña
CD Málaga	Málaga	La Rosaleda
Real Murcia	Murcia	Estadio de La Condomina
Xerez Club	Jerez de la Frontera	Domecq

=== League table ===
Pos	Team	Pld	W	D	L	GF	GA	GD	Pts	Qualification or relegation
1	Ceuta	14	8	4	2	27	17	+10	20	Qualification for the promotion playoffs
2	Xerez Club	14	7	3	4	23	22	+1	17	Qualification for the promotion playoffs
3	Real Murcia	14	6	3	5	26	19	+7	15 (Note: Murcia finished ahead of Hércules on overall goal difference)	
4	Hércules	14	6	3	5	20	18	+2	15	
5	CD Málaga (R)	14	7	0	7	26	23	+3	14	Qualification for the relegation playoffs
6	Elche (R)	14	5	2	7	16	26	−10	12	Qualification for the relegation playoffs
7	Cádiz (R)	14	4	3	7	19	25	−6	11	Qualification for the relegation playoffs
8	Alcoyano	14	4	0	10	21	28	−7	8	Qualification for the relegation playoffs

Source: BDFútbol
Rules for classification: 1) points; 2) head-to-head points; 3) head-to-head goal difference; 4) goal difference; 5) number of goals scored
(R) Relegated

=== Results ===
Home \ Away	ALC	CAD	CEU	ELC	HER	MAL	MUR	XER
CD Alcoyano		2–2	2–2	3–2	2–2	2–2	1–2	4–2
Cádiz CF	1–2		2–2	4–2	1–2	2–2	2–2	0–2
SD Ceuta	3–2	2–2		2–2	4–2	1–2	1–2	4–2
Elche CF	1–2	1–2	3–2		0–2	2–2	1–2	3–2
Hércules CF	4–2	2–2	1–2	3–2		2–2	3–2	1–2
CD Málaga	3–2	2–2	0–2	2–2	4–2		4–2	3–2
Real Murcia	3–2	5–2	1–2	4–2	3–2	2–2		0–2
Xerez Club	2–2	1–2	2–2	4–2	1–2	4–2	3–2	

Legend: Blue = home team win; Yellow = draw; Red = away team win.

=== Top goalscorers ===
Goalscorers	Goals	Team
(Spain) Vicente Morera	8	Jerez
(Spain) Marcelino Morla	7	Ceuta
(Spain) Juan Trujillo	7	Murcia
(Spain) José Rey	7	Alcoyano
(Spain) José Corona	6	Hércules

=== Top goalkeepers ===
Goalkeeper	Goals	Matches	Average	Team
(Spain) Pedrín	10	11	0.91	Murcia
(Spain) Joaquín Comas	17	14	1.21	Ceuta
(Spain) Juan Betancor	18	14	1.29	Hércules
(Spain) Antonio García	15	10	1.5	Cádiz
(Spain) José Bañón	22	14	1.57	Elche

== Promotion playoffs ==
=== First round ===
==== League table ====
Pos	Team	Pld	W	D	L	GF	GA	GD	Pts	Qualification or relegation
1	Sabadell (C, P)	10	6	1	3	20	11	+9	13	Promotion to La Liga
2	Real Sociedad (P)	10	5	2	3	24	14	+10	12	Promotion to La Liga
3	Real Valladolid	10	4	3	3	21	19	+2	11	Qualification for the second round
4	Real Gijón	10	4	2	4	17	23	−6	10	Qualification for the second round
5	Ceuta	10	2	4	4	10	15	−5	8	
6	Xerez Club	10	2	2	6	11	21	−10	6	

Source: BDFútbol
Rules for classification: 1) points; 2) head-to-head points; 3) head-to-head goal difference; 4) goal difference; 5) number of goals scored
(C) Champions; (P) Promoted

=== Second round ===
18 April 1943	Granada	2–0	Valladolid	Barcelona
	Nicola 71', 83'	Report		Stadium: Les Corts; Referee: Vilalta Bars

18 April 1943	Español	2–1	Real Gijón	Madrid
	Huguet 15'; Juncosa 26'	Report	Paladini 37'	Stadium: Metropolitano; Referee: Escartín

== Relegation playoffs ==
=== First round ===
==== Group 1 ====
===== League table =====
Pos	Team	Pld	W	D	L	GF	GA	GD	Pts	Qualification or relegation
1	Salamanca	8	6	0	2	19	9	+10	12	Qualification for the second round
2	Ferrol (R)	8	5	0	3	18	9	+9	10	
3	La Felguera	8	3	1	4	10	12	−2	7	
4	Fábrica Nacional	8	3	1	4	10	13	−3	7	
5	Lucense	8	2	0	6	12	26	−14	4	

Source: Arquero
Rules for classification: 1) points; 2) head-to-head points; 3) head-to-head goal difference; 4) goal difference; 5) number of goals scored
(R) Relegated

===== Results =====
Home \ Away	PAL	RFE	FEL	LUC	SAL
Fábrica Nacional	—	2–1	0–0	6–2	2–1
Ferrol	4–0	—	4–0	5–2	2–1
La Felguera	1–0	3–0	—	4–1	0–1
Lucense	1–0	0–2	2–1	—	1–3
Salamanca	3–0	1–0	4–1	5–3	—

Source: Arquero
Legend: Blue = home team win; Yellow = draw; Red = away team win.

==== Group 2 ====
===== League table =====
Pos	Team	Pld	W	D	L	GF	GA	GD	Pts	Qualification or relegation
1	Baracaldo	8	6	0	2	20	9	+11	12	Qualification for the second round
2	Real Santander (R)	8	5	0	3	19	16	+3	10	
3	Gimnástica Burgalesa	8	3	1	4	17	16	+1	7	
4	Logroñés	8	3	0	5	11	17	−6	6	
5	Sestao	8	2	1	5	12	21	−9	5	

Source: Arquero
Rules for classification: 1) points; 2) head-to-head points; 3) head-to-head goal difference; 4) goal difference; 5) number of goals scored
(R) Relegated

===== Results =====
Home \ Away	BAR	BUR	LOG	RAC	SES
Baracaldo	—	2–1	4–0	5–1	4–2
Gimnástica Burgalesa	1–2	—	3–2	4–3	4–0
Logroñés	1–2	2–0	—	1–0	3–0
Real Santander	2–1	3–2	3–1	—	3–1
Sestao	1–0	2–2	5–1	1–4	—

Source: Arquero
Legend: Blue = home team win; Yellow = draw; Red = away team win.

==== Group 3 ====
===== League table =====
Pos	Team	Pld	W	D	L	GF	GA	GD	Pts	Qualification or relegation
1	Alavés	8	6	0	2	18	9	+9	12	Qualification for the second round
2	Arenas	8	5	1	2	19	14	+5	11	
3	Tarrasa (R)	8	3	2	3	24	11	+13	8	
4	Alcalá	8	3	0	5	12	28	−16	6	
5	Tudelano	8	1	1	6	11	22	−11	3	

Source: Arquero
Rules for classification: 1) points; 2) head-to-head points; 3) head-to-head goal difference; 4) goal difference; 5) number of goals scored
(R) Relegated

===== Results =====
Home \ Away	ALA	ALC	ARE	TRR	TUD
Alavés	—	4–2	5–0	1–0	1–0
Alcalá	1–4	—	3–1	1–0	2–1
Arenas	2–0	3–0	—	5–2	5–3
Tarrasa	3–1	10–1	1–1	—	7–0
Tudelano	1–2	5–2	0–2	1–1	—

Source: Arquero
Legend: Blue = home team win; Yellow = draw; Red = away team win.

==== Group 4 ====
===== League table =====
Pos	Team	Pld	W	D	L	GF	GA	GD	Pts	Qualification or relegation
1	Alcoyano	8	6	0	2	19	14	+5	12	Qualification for the second round
2	Granollers	8	4	1	3	16	17	−1	9	
3	Mallorca	8	3	2	3	18	19	−1	8	
4	Gimnàstic	8	3	2	3	15	11	+4	8	
5	Gerona (R)	8	0	3	5	9	16	−7	3	

Source: BDFútbol
Rules for classification: 1) points; 2) head-to-head points; 3) head-to-head goal difference; 4) goal difference; 5) number of goals scored
(R) Relegated

==== Group 5 ====
===== League table =====
Pos	Team	Pld	W	D	L	GF	GA	GD	Pts	Qualification or relegation
1	Levante	8	6	0	2	23	9	+14	12	Qualification for the second round
2	CD Córdoba	8	4	3	1	13	10	+3	11	
3	Elche (R)	8	4	2	2	16	14	+2	10	
4	Ferroviaria (R)	8	1	2	5	12	24	−12	4	
5	Eldense	8	1	1	6	12	19	−7	3	

Source: BDFútbol
Rules for classification: 1) points; 2) head-to-head points; 3) head-to-head goal difference; 4) goal difference; 5) number of goals scored
(R) Relegated

==== Group 6 ====
===== League table =====
Pos	Team	Pld	W	D	L	GF	GA	GD	Pts	Qualification or relegation
1	Málaga	8	4	2	2	15	8	+7	10	Qualification for the second round
2	Atlético Tetuán	8	5	0	3	10	11	−1	10	
3	Cádiz (R)	8	3	2	3	17	13	+4	8	
4	Recreativo	8	3	1	4	12	16	−4	7	
5	Badajoz	8	1	3	4	9	15	−6	5	

Source: BDFútbol
Rules for classification: 1) points; 2) head-to-head points; 3) head-to-head goal difference; 4) goal difference; 5) number of goals scored
(R) Relegated

=== Second round ===
==== Group 1 ====
===== League table =====
Pos	Team	Pld	W	D	L	GF	GA	GD	Pts	Qualification or relegation
1	Baracaldo	4	3	1	0	14	3	+11	7	Remained at Segunda División
2	Alavés (R)	4	1	1	2	3	6	−3	3	
3	Salamanca (R)	4	1	0	3	2	10	−8	2	

Source: Arquero
Rules for classification: 1) points; 2) head-to-head points; 3) head-to-head goal difference; 4) goal difference; 5) number of goals scored
(R) Relegated

===== Results =====
Home \ Away	ALA	BAR	SAL
Alavés	—	2–2	1–0
Baracaldo	3–0	—	7–1
Salamanca	1–0	0–2	—

Source: Arquero
Legend: Blue = home team win; Yellow = draw; Red = away team win.

==== Group 2 ====
===== League table =====
Pos	Team	Pld	W	D	L	GF	GA	GD	Pts	Qualification or relegation
1	Alcoyano	4	3	1	0	13	3	+10	7	Remained at Segunda División
2	Málaga (R)	4	1	1	2	7	8	−1	3	
3	Levante	4	0	2	2	5	14	−9	2	

Source: Arquero
Rules for classification: 1) points; 2) head-to-head points; 3) head-to-head goal difference; 4) goal difference; 5) number of goals scored
(R) Relegated

===== Results =====
Home \ Away	ALC	LEV	CDM
Alcoyano	—	6–0	3–0
Levante	2–2	—	3–3
Málaga	1–2	3–0	—

Source: Arquero
Legend: Blue = home team win; Yellow = draw; Red = away team win.
