= SD Ceuta =

Spanish football club

Ceuta
- Full name: Sociedad Deportiva Ceuta
- Founded: 1932 (as Ceuta SC)
- Dissolved: 1956
- Ground: Alfonso Murube, Ceuta, Spain
- Capacity: 6,500
Home colours	Away colours

Sociedad Deportiva Ceuta was a Spanish football team based in the autonomous city of Ceuta. Founded in 1932 and dissolved in 1956, it held home matches at Estadio Alfonso Murube, with a capacity of 6,500.

== History ==
SD Ceuta was founded in 1932, after a merger of Ceuta FC and Cultural SC, under the name of Ceuta SC. It first played in Segunda División in 1939, being relegated but immediately returning the following season.

The club enjoyed a five-year spell in the second division from 1941 to 1946. Another four campaigns in Tercera División followed, and after a one-year spell in Segunda in 1950–51, the club spent five seasons in the third division before merging with Atlético Tetuán to form Atlético Ceuta.

=== Club background ===
- Ceuta Sport Club — (1932–41); renamed in 1941 to Sociedad Deportiva Ceuta
- Sociedad Deportiva Ceuta — (1941–56); in 1956 merged with the Spanish elements of Club Atlético Tetuán to form Club Atlético de Ceuta

=== Other clubs from Ceuta ===
- Club Atlético de Ceuta — (1956–); renamed in 2013 to Agrupación Deportiva Ceuta Fútbol Club
- Club Imperio de Ceuta Sociedad Deportiva — (1958–)
- Agrupación Deportiva Ceuta — (1969–91)
- Club Ceutí Atlético – (1996–97)
- Asociación Deportiva Ceuta – (1997–2012)
- Agrupación Deportiva Ceuta Fútbol Club — (2013–)

== Honours ==
- North Africa Championship:
  - Winners (7): 1933–34, 1934–35, 1938–39, 1939–40, 1940–41, 1954–55, 1955–56

== Season to season ==
=== As Ceuta SC ===
Season	Tier	Division	Place	Copa del Rey
1933–34	4	1ª Reg.		Round of 32
1934–35	4	1ª Reg.	1st	Fourth round
1935–36	4	1ª Reg.	1st	
1938–39	4	1ª Reg.		Preliminary
1939–40	2	2ª	7th	Round of 32

=== As SD Ceuta ===
Season	Tier	Division	Place	Copa del Rey
1940–41	3	3ª	1st	Second round
1941–42	2	2ª	5th	First round
1942–43	2	2ª	1st	Quarter-finals
1943–44	2	2ª	8th	Round of 32
1944–45	2	2ª	9th	First round
1945–46	2	2ª	14th	Round of 16
1946–47	3	3ª	3rd	
1947–48	3	3ª	4th	First round

Season	Tier	Division	Place	Copa del Rey
1948–49	3	3ª	6th	Fourth round
1949–50	3	3ª	1st	
1950–51	2	2ª	14th	
1951–52	3	3ª	5th	
1952–53	3	3ª	7th	
1953–54	3	3ª	5th	
1954–55	3	3ª	1st	
1955–56	3	3ª	1st	

- 7 seasons in Segunda División
- 10 seasons in Tercera División
