= 1943–44 Segunda División =

13th season of the second-tier football league in Spain

Segunda División
- Season: 1943–44
- Champions: Real Gijón
- Promoted: Real Gijón; Murcia
- Relegated: Arenas; Valladolid; Osasuna
- Matches: 182
- Goals: 624 (3.43 per match)
- Top goalscorer: Juan Araujo (21 goals)
- Best goalkeeper: Andrés Lerín (0.73 goals/match)
- Biggest home win: Constancia 7–0 Arenas (5 December 1943)
- Biggest away win: Valladolid 1–5 Real Gijón (12 December 1943)
- Highest scoring: Zaragoza 6–3 Ceuta (17 October 1943)

The 1943–44 Segunda División season was the 13th since its establishment and was played between 26 September 1943 and 9 April 1944. Unlike past season, all the teams played in a single group of 14 teams.

== Overview before the season ==
14 teams joined the league, including two relegated from the 1942–43 La Liga.

Relegated from La Liga

- Zaragoza
- Real Betis

== Teams ==
Location of teams in Segunda División 1943-44

| Club | City | Stadium |
|---|---|---|
| CD Alcoyano | Alcoy | El Collao |
| Arenas Club | Guecho | Ibaiondo |
| Club Baracaldo | Baracaldo | Lasesarre |
| Real Betis Balompié | Seville | Heliópolis |
| SD Ceuta | Ceuta | Campo de Deporte |
| CD Constancia | Inca | Camp d’Es Cos |
| Cultural y Deportiva Leonesa | León | La Corredera |
| Real Gijón | Gijón | El Molinón |
| Hércules CF | Alicante | La Viña |
| Jerez FC | Jerez de la Frontera | Domecq |
| Real Murcia | Murcia | Estadio de La Condomina |
| CA Osasuna | Pamplona | San Juan |
| Real Valladolid Deportivo | Valladolid | José Zorrilla |
| Zaragoza FC | Zaragoza | Torrero |

== League table ==
| Pos | Team | Pld | W | D | L | GF | GA | GD | Pts | Promotion, qualification or relegation |
|---|---|---|---|---|---|---|---|---|---|---|
| 1 | Real Gijón (C, P) | 26 | 16 | 5 | 5 | 50 | 19 | +31 | 37 | Promotion to La Liga |
| 2 | Murcia (P) | 26 | 15 | 2 | 9 | 62 | 40 | +22 | 32 | Promotion to La Liga |
| 3 | Constancia | 26 | 15 | 1 | 10 | 49 | 37 | +12 | 31 | Qualification for the promotion playoffs |
| 4 | Alcoyano | 26 | 12 | 6 | 8 | 44 | 34 | +10 | 30 (Note: Alcoyano finished ahead of Jerez on overall goal difference) | Qualification for the promotion playoffs |
| 5 | Jerez | 26 | 14 | 2 | 10 | 50 | 41 | +9 | 30 | |
| 6 | Zaragoza | 26 | 12 | 5 | 9 | 56 | 40 | +16 | 29 (Note: Zaragoza finished ahead of Real Betis on head-to-head goal difference: Real Betis–Zaragoza 1–0, Zaragoza–Real Betis 3–1) | |
| 7 | Real Betis | 26 | 11 | 7 | 8 | 50 | 44 | +6 | 29 | |
| 8 | Ceuta | 26 | 10 | 5 | 11 | 47 | 45 | +2 | 25 (Note: Ceuta finished ahead of Cultural Leonesa on overall goal difference) | |
| 9 | Cultural Leonesa | 26 | 11 | 3 | 12 | 42 | 45 | −3 | 25 | |
| 10 | Hércules | 26 | 9 | 4 | 13 | 38 | 45 | −7 | 22 | |
| 11 | Baracaldo (O) | 26 | 8 | 3 | 15 | 34 | 61 | −27 | 19 (Note: Baracaldo finished ahead of Arenas on head-to-head goal difference: Arenas–Baracaldo 3–1, Baracaldo–Arenas 4–1) | Qualification for the relegation playoffs |
| 12 | Arenas (R) | 26 | 7 | 5 | 14 | 39 | 60 | −21 | 19 | Qualification for the relegation playoffs |
| 13 | Valladolid (R) | 26 | 6 | 6 | 14 | 29 | 53 | −24 | 18 (Note: Valladolid finished ahead of Osasuna on overall goal difference) | Relegation to Tercera División |
| 14 | Osasuna (R) | 26 | 7 | 4 | 15 | 34 | 60 | −26 | 18 | Relegation to Tercera División |

Source: BDFútbol
Rules for classification: 1) points; 2) head-to-head points; 3) head-to-head goal difference; 4) goal difference; 5) number of goals scored
(C) Champions; (O) Play-off winners; (P) Promoted; (R) Relegated

== Results ==
| Home \ Away | ALC | ARE | BAR | CEU | CON | LEO | HER | MUR | OSA | BET | SPO | VLL | XER | ZAR |
|---|---|---|---|---|---|---|---|---|---|---|---|---|---|---|
| Alcoyano | — | 2–1 | 6–1 | 1–0 | 2–1 | 3–0 | 1–1 | 3–2 | 3–1 | 0–0 | 0–3 | 2–0 | 1–0 | 6–1 |
| Arenas | 1–0 | — | 3–1 | 1–1 | 4–1 | 3–4 | 4–0 | 0–1 | 3–0 | 1–3 | 1–1 | 0–0 | 2–0 | 2–1 |
| Baracaldo | 2–0 | 4–1 | — | 1–1 | 2–1 | 1–0 | 3–0 | 1–0 | 4–1 | 1–1 | 0–3 | 3–1 | 1–2 | 0–3 |
| Ceuta | 0–2 | 5–0 | 2–1 | — | 2–3 | 2–1 | 2–1 | 5–1 | 5–1 | 2–1 | 1–1 | 2–0 | 1–2 | 3–2 |
| Constancia | 1–0 | 7–0 | 5–1 | 0–1 | — | 1–0 | 3–1 | 1–0 | 3–1 | 4–1 | 1–0 | 3–1 | 2–0 | 3–1 |
| Cultural Leonesa | 1–1 | 4–3 | 3–0 | 3–2 | 1–3 | — | 2–1 | 0–1 | 4–1 | 4–0 | 1–0 | 2–2 | 3–0 | 2–1 |
| Hércules | 0–1 | 1–1 | 2–1 | 1–1 | 0–1 | 3–2 | — | 2–0 | 4–0 | 2–0 | 0–2 | 2–2 | 3–1 | 1–2 |
| Murcia | 2–2 | 5–1 | 7–1 | 2–0 | 4–1 | 3–1 | 3–2 | — | 4–0 | 4–4 | 4–2 | 1–0 | 4–1 | 4–1 |
| Osasuna | 3–1 | 2–2 | 3–0 | 5–1 | 1–1 | 3–0 | 1–2 | 1–3 | — | 4–0 | 1–1 | 2–1 | 1–0 | 1–1 |
| Real Betis | 3–3 | 3–2 | 4–1 | 1–1 | 4–1 | 2–1 | 3–1 | 3–1 | 5–0 | — | 1–0 | 6–1 | 1–1 | 1–0 |
| Real Gijón | 3–1 | 5–0 | 2–0 | 1–0 | 2–1 | 3–0 | 1–3 | 1–0 | 3–0 | 1–0 | — | 5–1 | 3–1 | 1–0 |
| Valladolid | 1–1 | 3–2 | 4–1 | 2–1 | 1–0 | 0–1 | 1–2 | 1–4 | 2–1 | 1–1 | 1–5 | — | 1–0 | 1–1 |
| Jerez | 2–1 | 4–0 | 4–1 | 5–3 | 2–0 | 5–1 | 4–2 | 3–1 | 3–0 | 4–1 | 1–1 | 3–0 | — | 1–0 |
| Zaragoza | 4–1 | 2–1 | 2–2 | 6–3 | 5–1 | 1–1 | 3–1 | 3–1 | 4–0 | 3–1 | 0–0 | 2–1 | 7–1 | — |

Source: BDFútbol
Legend: Blue = home team win; Yellow = draw; Red = away team win.

== Top goalscorers ==
| Goalscorers | Goals | Team |
|---|---|---|
| (Spain) Juan Araujo | 21 | Jerez |
| (Spain) Roldán | 18 | Real Betis |
| (Spain) Manuel Abad | 15 | Ceuta |
| (Spain) Tavilo | 15 | Cultural Leonesa |
| (Spain) Perfecto Gastón | 12 | Osasuna |

== Top goalkeepers ==
| Goalkeeper | Goals | Matches | Average | Team |
|---|---|---|---|---|
| (Spain) Andrés Lerín | 19 | 26 | 0.73 | Real Gijón |
| (Spain) Emilio Payá | 12 | 10 | 1.2 | Alcoyano |
| (Spain) Paquillo | 16 | 13 | 1.23 | Real Betis |
| (Spain) Joaquín Comas | 24 | 19 | 1.26 | Ceuta |
| (Spain) Andrés Company | 31 | 23 | 1.35 | Constancia |

== Promotion playoffs ==
| 16 April 1944 | Deportivo La Coruña | 4–0 | Constancia | Madrid |
| | Paquirri 19', 55'; Viso 46', 53' | Report | | Stadium: Chamartín; Referee: Iturralde Gorostiaga |

| 16 April 1944 | Español | 7–1 | Alcoyano | Barcelona |
| | Jorge 3', 33', 67'; Viela 23'; Sáenz 57' (o.g.); Teruel 61' (pen.); Mendoza 80' | Report | Carbonilla 18' | Stadium: Les Corts; Referee: Escartín |

== Relegation playoffs ==
| 19 April 1944 | Baracaldo | 3–2 | Levante | Madrid |
| | Calvo 12', 24'; Gárate 65' | Report | Escrivá 55'; Luján 57' | Stadium: Metropolitano; Referee: Melcón |

| 23 April 1944 | Racing Ferrol | 1–0 | Arenas | Madrid |
| | Herodes 40' | Report | | Stadium: Metropolitano; Referee: Escartín |
