= 1950–51 UE Lleida season =

UE Lleida
1950–51 season
- Manager: (Spain) Emilio Vidal (to January) (Spain) Francisco Pirla (from January)
- La Liga: 16th (relegated)
- Copa Federación de España: Semi-final
- Top goalscorer: League: Ignacio Bidegain (8); All: Ignacio Bidegain (8)
Home colours

The 1950–51 season was the 12th season in UE Lleida's existence, first in La Liga, and covered the period from 1 July 1950 to 30 June 1951. Having won promotion in the previous season UE Lleida struggled in the league and finished bottom and subsequently got relegated back to the Segunda División. They did fair a little better in the Copa Federación by reaching the semi-finals to crash out 6–3 aggregate against Barakaldo CF.

== First-team squad ==
Note: Flags indicate national team as defined under FIFA eligibility rules; some limited exceptions apply. Players may hold more than one non-FIFA nationality.

No.	Pos.	Nation	Player
1	GK	(Spain) ESP	Antonio Montserrat
12	GK	(Spain) ESP	José Francisco Rivero
17	GK	(Spain) ESP	Primitivo Eroles
2	DF	(Spain) ESP	Benjamín Telechea
3	DF	(Spain) ESP	Félix Carrillo
4	DF	(Spain) ESP	Andrés Esquerda
5	DF	(Spain) ESP	Luis Pellicer
13	DF	(Argentina) ARG	José Valle
18	DF	(Spain) ESP	Joaquín Rigau
23	DF	(Spain) ESP	Vicente Lázaro
6	MF	(Spain) ESP	Juan Manuel Martínez
7	MF	(Spain) ESP	Manuel Cerveró
8	MF	(Spain) ESP	Ignacio Bidegain

No.	Pos.	Nation	Player
9	MF	(Argentina) ARG	Vicente di Paola
14	MF	(Spain) ESP	Enrique Giménez
15	MF	(Spain) ESP	Antonio Alsúa
19	MF	(Spain) ESP	Ignacio Cánovas
20	MF	(Italy) ITA	Sergio del Pinto
24	MF	(Spain) ESP	Antonio Roca
-	FW	(Spain) ESP	Juan del Pino
10	FW	(Spain) ESP	Guillermo Ramón
11	FW	(Spain) ESP	Sebastián Fustero
16	FW	(Spain) ESP	Francisco Nogués
21	FW	(Spain) ESP	Antonio Gausí
22	FW	(Spain) ESP	Francisco Hidalgo

== League table ==
Pos	Team	Pld	W	D	L	GF	GA	GD	Pts	Qualification or relegation
1	Atlético Madrid (C)	30	17	6	7	87	50	+37	40	Qualification for the Latin Cup
2	Sevilla	30	17	4	9	79	46	+33	38	
3	Valencia	30	17	3	10	64	48	+16	37	
4	Barcelona	30	16	3	11	83	61	+22	35	
5	Real Sociedad	30	15	5	10	77	56	+21	35	
6	Valladolid	30	14	5	11	51	51	0	33	
7	Atlético Bilbao	30	15	3	12	88	56	+32	33	
8	Celta	30	15	3	12	62	56	+6	33	
9	Real Madrid	30	13	5	12	80	71	+9	31	
10	Real Santander	30	12	6	12	49	60	−11	30	
11	Español	30	13	4	13	82	72	+10	30	
12	Deportivo La Coruña	30	13	4	13	64	47	+17	30	
13	Málaga (R)	30	12	5	13	55	52	+3	29	Qualification for the relegation group
14	Murcia (R)	30	8	3	19	40	86	−46	19	Qualification for the relegation group
15	Alcoyano (R)	30	6	2	22	36	92	−56	14	Relegation to the Segunda División
16	Lérida (R)	30	6	1	23	41	134	−93	13	Relegation to the Segunda División

Source: BDFútbol
Rules for classification: 1) Points; 2) Head-to-head results; 3) Goal difference; 4) Number of goals scored
(C) Champions; (R) Relegated
