= 1941 Copa del Generalísimo =

39th Copa del Rey

Tournament details
- Country: Spain
- Teams: 42

Final positions
- Champions: Valencia (1st title)
- Runners-up: RCD Español

Tournament statistics
- Matches played: 94

The 1941 Copa del Generalísimo was the 39th staging of the Copa del Rey, the Spanish football cup competition.

The competition began on 23 March 1941 and concluded on 29 June 1941 with the final.

== Teams ==
The 42 teams qualified for the competition based on their participation and position in the national league championships. This was the first edition of the Spanish Cup in which qualification was no longer determined by the regional championships.

Division	Qualified teams	Entry
Primera División	Atlético Aviación, Sevilla FC, Athletic Bilbao, Real Madrid, Hércules CF, RCD Espanyol, Real Zaragoza, Valencia CF, FC Barcelona, Celta de Vigo, Real Oviedo, Real Murcia	Third round
Segunda División – Group I	Real Sociedad, Deportivo de La Coruña, Sporting de Gijón, Racing de Ferrol, CA Osasuna, Racing de Santander, UD Salamanca, Arenas Club de Getxo, Real Unión, Real Valladolid, Barakaldo CF, Real Avilés	First round / Second round
Segunda División – Group II	Levante UD, Girona FC, CD Malacitano, Xerez FC, Real Betis, Cádiz CF, CE Sabadell, FC Cartagena, Córdoba CF, CF Badalona, CD Castellón, Granada CF	First round / Second round
Tercera División	CD Constancia, Deportivo Alavés, Racing Langreano, Elche CF, AD Ferroviaria, Ceuta Sport	Second round

== First round ==
Team 1	Agg.	Team 2	1st leg	2nd leg
Stadium Club Avilesino	1–19	Real Gijón	1–6	0–13
Real Santander SD	1–6	Club Ferrol	1–1	0–5
Real Unión Club	4–9	CA Osasuna	2–1	2–8
Arenas Club	3–15	Baracaldo CF	1–4	2–11
Badalona CF	1–3	Gerona CF	1–1	0–2
UD Levante Gimnástico	4–2	CD Sabadell CF	3–1	1–1
UD Salamanca	2–5	Real Valladolid Deportivo	1–3	1–2
RCD Córdoba	2–5	Cartagena CF	2–2	0–3
Jerez CF	2–3	CD Malacitano	1–0	1–3
Real Betis Balompié	3–3	Cádiz CF	1–2	2–1

Source: RSSSF

- Tiebreaker

Team 1	Score	Team 2
Real Betis Balompié	5–1	Cádiz CF

== Second round ==
Team 1	Agg.	Team 2	1st leg	2nd leg
Real Valladolid Deportivo	7–2	Club Ferrol	5–0	2–2
Racing Langreano	0–7	Real Gijón	0–4	0–3
CD Alavés	3–5	Baracaldo CF	1–1	2–4
CA Osasuna	1–6	UD Levante Gimnástico	1–1	0–5
CD Constancia	2–4	Gerona CF	1–0	1–4
Elche CF	1–3	Cartagena CF	1–1	0–2
AD Ferroviaria	1–10	CD Malacitano	1–4	0–6
SD Ceuta	3–4	Real Betis Balompié	2–1	1–3

Source: RSSSF

== Third round ==
Team 1	Agg.	Team 2	1st leg	2nd leg
Gerona CF	3–7	RCD Español	1–1	2–6
RC Deportivo de La Coruña	2–11	RC Celta de Vigo	2–3	0–8
Real Gijón	3–7	Real Oviedo CF	1–4	2–3
Baracaldo CF	3–4	Real Valladolid Deportivo	3–1	0–3
UD Levante Gimnástico	9–4	Real Zaragoza CD	5–3	4–1
CD Castellón	7–4	Hércules CF	5–2	2–2
Cartagena CF	3–4	Real Murcia CF	1–2	2–2
Real Betis Balompié	1–0	CD Malacitano	0–0	1–0

Source: RSSSF

== Round of 16 ==
Team 1	Agg.	Team 2	1st leg	2nd leg
CF Barcelona	4–6	RCD Español	1–2	3–4
Real Betis Balompié	2–13	Club Atlético de Aviación	1–5	1–8
CD Castellón	2–7	Sevilla CF	1–2	1–5
Club Atlético de Bilbao	3–4	Valencia CF	2–1	1–3
Real Madrid C.F.	4–5	RC Celta de Vigo	2–2	2–3
Real Oviedo CF	3–3	Real Murcia CF	2–1	1–2
Real Valladolid Deportivo	3–3	Real Sociedad de Fútbol	1–0	2–3
UD Levante Gimnástico	4–3	Granada CF	3–2	1–1

Source: RSSSF

- Tiebreaker

Team 1	Score	Team 2
Real Oviedo CF	1–1	Real Murcia CF
Real Oviedo CF	3–2	Real Murcia CF
Real Valladolid Deportivo	1–3	Real Sociedad de Fútbol

== Quarter-finals ==
Team 1	Agg.	Team 2	1st leg	2nd leg
Real Oviedo	3–4	RC Celta de Vigo	3–2	0–2
Real Sociedad	2–1	Atlético Aviación	2–1	0–0
RCD Español	0–0	UD Levante Gimnástico	0–0	0–0
Valencia CF	9–3	Sevilla CF	8–1	1–2

Source: RSSSF

- Tiebreaker

Team 1	Score	Team 2
RCD Español	3–0	UD Levante Gimnástico

== Semi-finals ==
Team 1	Agg.	Team 2	1st leg	2nd leg
RCD Español	8–2	Real Sociedad	6–0	2–2
RC Celta de Vigo	1–6	Valencia CF	1–2	0–4

Source: RSSSF

== Final ==
Team 1	Score	Team 2
Valencia CF	3–1	RCD Español

Source: RSSSF

Copa del Generalísimo
winners
Valencia
1st title
