= 1944–45 Segunda División =

14th season of the second-tier football league in Spain

Segunda División
- Season: 1944–45
- Champions: Alcoyano
- Promoted: Alcoyano; Hércules; Celta Vigo
- Relegated: Constancia; Cultural Leonesa; Baracaldo
- Matches: 182
- Goals: 691 (3.8 per match)
- Top goalscorer: Juan Araujo (22 goals)
- Best goalkeeper: Juan Galcerá (1.2 goals/match)
- Biggest home win: Real Santander 8–1 Ferrol (26 November 1944)
- Biggest away win: Real Santander 1–4 Hércules (15 October 1944); Zaragoza 1–4 Alcoyano (3 December 1944); Baracaldo 0–3 Real Santander (13 May 1945); Jerez 1–4 Alcoyano (13 May 1945)
- Highest scoring: Celta Vigo 7–2 Baracaldo (26 November 1944); Real Santander 8–1 Ferrol (26 November 1944)

The 1944–45 Segunda División season was the 14th since its establishment and was played between 24 September 1944 and 20 May 1945.

== Overview before the season ==
14 teams joined the league, including two relegated from the 1943–44 La Liga and three promoted from the 1943–44 Tercera División.

Relegated from La Liga

- Real Sociedad
- Celta Vigo

Promoted from Tercera División

- Real Santander
- Mallorca
- Ferrol

== Teams ==
Location of teams in Segunda División 1944-45

Club	City	Stadium
CD Alcoyano	Alcoy	El Collao
Club Baracaldo	Baracaldo	Lasesarre
Real Betis Balompié	Seville	Heliópolis
RC Celta de Vigo	Vigo	Balaídos
SD Ceuta	Ceuta	Campo de Deporte
CD Constancia	Inca	Camp d’Es Cos
Cultural y Deportiva Leonesa	León	La Corredera
Club Ferrol	Ferrol	Inferniño
Hércules CF	Alicante	La Viña
Jerez FC	Jerez de la Frontera	Domecq
CD Mallorca	Palma de Mallorca	Buenos Aires
Real Sociedad	San Sebastián	Atocha
Real Santander SD	Santander	El Sardinero
Zaragoza FC	Zaragoza	Torrero

== League table ==
Pos	Team	Pld	W	D	L	GF	GA	GD	Pts	Promotion, qualification or relegation
1	Alcoyano (C, P)	26	13	8	5	57	35	+22	34	Promotion to La Liga
2	Hércules (P)	26	15	3	8	55	39	+16	33	Promotion to La Liga
3	Celta Vigo (O, P)	26	14	4	8	65	40	+25	32	Qualification for the promotion playoffs
4	Real Sociedad	26	12	7	7	56	34	+22	31	
5	Jerez	26	11	7	8	52	50	+2	29	
6	Real Santander	26	11	4	11	69	57	+12	26 (Note: Real Santander finished ahead of Zaragoza and Real Betis on head-to-head goal difference)	
7	Zaragoza	26	12	2	12	50	53	−3	26	
8	Real Betis	26	11	4	11	45	47	−2	26	
9	Ceuta	26	10	4	12	40	49	−9	24 (Note: Ceuta finished ahead of Ferrol on head-to-head points: Ceuta–Ferrol 0–1, Ferrol–Ceuta 2–1)	
10	Ferrol	26	10	4	12	44	68	−24	24	
11	Mallorca	26	9	4	13	44	55	−11	22 (Note: Mallorca finished ahead of Constancia and Cultural Leonesa on head-to-head goal difference)	
12	Constancia (R)	26	9	4	13	42	53	−11	22	Qualification for the relegation playoffs
13	Cultural Leonesa (R)	26	10	2	14	41	49	−8	22	Relegation to Tercera División
14	Baracaldo (R)	26	5	3	18	31	62	−31	13	Relegation to Tercera División

Source: BDFútbol
Rules for classification: 1) points; 2) head-to-head points; 3) head-to-head goal difference; 4) goal difference; 5) number of goals scored
(C) Champions; (O) Play-off winners; (P) Promoted; (R) Relegated

== Results ==
Home \ Away	ALC	BAR	CEL	CEU	CON	LEO	HER	MAL	RFE	RAC	BET	RSO	XER	ZAR
Alcoyano	—	2–0	1–0	7–0	3–1	0–0	2–2	1–1	4–1	6–1	2–2	2–1	1–1	4–1
Baracaldo	0–1	—	3–3	0–1	0–2	2–0	1–3	4–2	2–1	0–3	3–1	2–2	2–2	3–1
Celta Vigo	2–2	7–2	—	4–2	4–0	3–0	5–0	4–0	4–2	2–1	4–0	1–1	6–1	3–1
Ceuta	2–3	3–0	2–1	—	2–1	0–3	4–2	5–1	2–0	0–1	0–2	1–0	1–1	4–1
Constancia	4–2	1–0	0–1	3–3	—	2–0	3–1	2–1	3–1	2–2	1–1	0–2	2–1	5–1
Cultural Leonesa	3–0	1–0	1–2	3–1	4–3	—	2–3	3–1	1–3	6–2	2–0	0–2	2–2	3–0
Hércules	0–2	3–1	2–0	1–0	5–0	3–0	—	6–1	1–3	6–1	4–3	1–0	1–2	2–0
Mallorca	3–1	2–0	0–1	2–3	2–0	3–1	3–1	—	1–1	5–2	4–2	2–1	0–0	3–1
Ferrol	2–1	5–2	3–1	2–2	3–2	3–1	1–1	3–2	—	2–1	2–1	1–1	4–2	0–2
Real Santander	1–1	3–1	2–2	2–1	1–1	5–1	1–4	6–2	8–1	—	3–0	5–3	4–1	6–0
Real Betis	1–1	3–1	4–0	0–0	2–0	2–1	3–0	1–0	3–0	3–2	—	1–3	5–1	1–0
Real Sociedad	4–0	5–1	4–3	2–0	3–1	4–1	0–0	1–1	7–1	4–2	2–1	—	3–1	1–1
Jerez	1–4	2–0	4–2	3–0	3–2	1–0	3–0	2–0	5–0	4–3	4–2	1–1	—	2–2
Zaragoza	1–4	3–1	2–0	4–1	5–1	4–0	0–1	3–2	3–1	2–1	7–1	2–1	3–2	—

Source: BDFútbol
Legend: Blue = home team win; Yellow = draw; Red = away team win.

== Top goalscorers ==
Goalscorers	Goals	Team
(Spain) Juan Araujo	22	Jerez
(Spain) Francisco Lahuerta	17	Hércules
(Spain) Sebastián Ontoria	17	Real Sociedad
(Spain) José Saras	17	Real Santander
(Spain) Juan Costa	14	Alcoyano

== Top goalkeepers ==
Goalkeeper	Goals	Matches	Average	Team
(Spain) Juan Galcerá	12	10	1.2	Alcoyano
(Spain) Cabezo	14	11	1.27	Celta Vigo
(Spain) Román Galarraga	34	26	1.31	Real Sociedad
(Spain) Roberto García	24	16	1.5	Hércules
(Spain) Ramón Casafont	21	14	1.5	Real Betis

== Promotion playoffs ==
17 June 1945	Celta Vigo	4–1	Granada	Madrid
	Fuentes 37'; Pahiño 47', 74'; Aretio 85'	Report	Nicola 76'	Stadium: Metropolitano; Referee: González Díaz

== Relegation playoffs ==
24 June 1945	Real Córdoba	3–2	Constancia	Madrid
	Yeto 58'; Manolín 78', 84'	Report	Sans 46'; Vergara 52'	Stadium: Chamartín; Referee: González Díaz
