= 1940–41 Segunda División =

10th season of the second-tier football league in Spain

Segunda División
- Season: 1940–41
- Champions: Granada CF
- Promoted: Granada CF; Real Sociedad; Deportivo La Coruña; CD Castellón
- Relegated: Real Avilés CF; CF Badalona; CD Córdoba
- Matches: 264
- Goals: 1,059 (4.01 per match)
- Top goalscorer: Julio Elicegui (26 goals)
- Best goalkeeper: Florentino Buey (0.90 goals/match)
- Biggest home win: Real Sociedad 14–2 Valladolid (8 January 1941)
- Biggest away win: Badalona 1–9 Castellón (16 February 1941)
- Highest scoring: Real Sociedad 14–2 Valladolid (8 January 1941)

The 1940–41 Segunda División season saw 24 teams participate in the second flight Spanish league. Granada, Real Sociedad, Deportivo and Castellón were promoted to 1941–42 Primera División. Real Avilés, Badalona and Córdoba were relegated to Tercera División.

== Group 1 ==
=== Teams ===
Location of teams in Segunda División 1940-41 G-1

Club	City	Stadium
Arenas Club	Guecho	Ibaiondo
Real Avilés CF	Avilés	Las Arobias
Baracaldo-Oriamendi	Baracaldo	Lasesarre
RCD La Coruña	La Coruña	Riazor
Club Ferrol	Ferrol	Inferniño
Real Gijón	Gijón	El Molinón
CA Osasuna	Pamplona	San Juan
Real Sociedad	San Sebastián	Atocha
Real Unión Club	Irun	Stadium Gal
UD Salamanca	Salamanca	El Calvario
Real Santander SD	Santander	El Sardinero
Real Valladolid Deportivo	Valladolid	José Zorrilla

=== League table ===
Pos	Team	Pld	W	D	L	GF	GA	GD	Pts	Qualification or relegation
1	Real Sociedad (O, P)	22	16	2	4	81	40	+41	34	Qualification for the promotion playoffs
2	Deportivo La Coruña (O, P)	22	14	5	3	75	26	+49	33	Qualification for the promotion playoffs
3	Real Gijón	22	13	3	6	54	40	+14	29	
4	Ferrol	22	11	4	7	49	38	+11	26	
5	Osasuna	22	11	2	9	44	45	−1	24	
6	Real Santander	22	9	4	9	42	40	+2	22	
7	Salamanca	22	6	6	10	38	48	−10	18 (Note: Salamanca finished ahead of Arenas on head-to-head points: Arenas–Salamanca 2–3, Salamanca–Arenas 4–0)	
8	Arenas	22	8	2	12	28	47	−19	18	
9	Real Unión	22	6	5	11	37	58	−21	17	
10	Real Valladolid	22	7	2	13	40	63	−23	16 (Note: Valladolid finished ahead of Baracaldo on head-to-head points: Baracaldo–Valladolid 2–3, Valladolid–Baracaldo 2–0)	
11	Baracaldo-Oriamendi (O)	22	5	6	11	40	57	−17	16	Qualification for the relegation playoffs
12	Real Avilés (R)	22	2	7	13	28	54	−26	11	Relegation to Tercera División

Source: BDFútbol
Rules for classification: 1) points; 2) head-to-head points; 3) head-to-head goal difference; 4) goal difference; 5) number of goals scored
(O) Play-off winners; (P) Promoted; (R) Relegated

=== Results ===
Home \ Away	ARE	AVI	BAR	DEP	FER	GIJ	OSA	RSO	RUN	SAL	SAT	VLL
Arenas	—	1–1	3–2	2–1	2–1	0–2	4–0	1–2	3–0	2–3	1–0	5–3
Real Avilés	1–2	—	0–1	2–5	0–1	1–1	1–1	0–2	1–1	3–3	1–0	2–1
Baracaldo-Oriamendi	2–0	4–1	—	2–2	1–1	6–1	3–5	3–3	3–3	2–1	2–2	2–3
Deportivo La Coruña	7–0	7–0	9–0	—	2–0	3–1	6–2	2–2	3–1	3–1	7–0	2–1
Ferrol	2–0	4–2	4–0	1–1	—	1–3	6–3	4–2	2–3	4–1	2–1	5–2
Real Gijón	4–0	5–4	2–1	1–3	3–2	—	2–1	4–0	4–3	2–2	3–0	1–3
Osasuna	2–0	3–2	1–1	0–4	1–3	3–1	—	1–2	6–1	2–0	0–2	3–1
Real Sociedad	4–1	3–2	4–1	4–2	5–1	2–1	0–2	—	6–2	3–1	7–2	14–2
Real Unión	0–0	5–1	4–1	2–0	1–3	1–5	1–3	1–6	—	0–0	0–3	0–3
Salamanca	4–0	4–2	3–1	1–1	0–0	0–0	1–3	1–2	3–5	—	1–5	6–1
Real Santander	2–0	0–0	3–2	2–2	1–1	2–5	4–0	3–2	0–1	7–1	—	3–1
Real Valladolid	4–1	0–0	2–0	1–3	4–1	2–3	0–2	3–6	2–2	0–1	1–0	—

Source: BDFútbol
Legend: Blue = home team win; Yellow = draw; Red = away team win.

== Group 2 ==
=== Teams ===
Location of teams in Segunda División 1940-41 G-2

Club	City	Stadium
CF Badalona	Badalona	Avenida de Navarra
Real Betis Balompié	Seville	Heliópolis
Cádiz CF	Cádiz	La Mirandilla
Cartagena CF	Cartagena	El Almarjal
CD Castellón	Castellón de la Plana	Campo del Sequiol
CD Córdoba	Córdoba	América
Gerona CF	Gerona	Vista Alegre
Granada CF	Granada	Los Cármenes
UD Levante-Gimnástico	Valencia	Vallejo
CD Malacitano	Málaga	Baños del Carmen
CD Sabadell FC	Sabadell	Cruz Alta
Xerez Club	Jerez de la Frontera	Domecq

=== League table ===
Pos	Team	Pld	W	D	L	GF	GA	GD	Pts	Qualification or relegation
1	Castellón (O, P)	22	14	3	5	64	34	+30	31	Qualification for the promotion playoffs
2	Granada (O, P)	22	13	4	5	43	21	+22	30	Qualification for the promotion playoffs
3	Levante-Gimnástico	22	13	3	6	59	35	+24	29	
4	Gerona	22	12	2	8	44	28	+16	26	
5	Malacitano	22	10	5	7	45	34	+11	25	
6	Xerez Club	22	9	5	8	32	38	−6	23 (Note: Xerez finished ahead of Real Betis on head-to-head points: Real Betis–Xerez 1–1, Xerez–Real Betis 1–0)	
7	Real Betis	22	10	3	9	45	33	+12	23	
8	Cádiz	22	9	3	10	46	34	+12	21	
9	Sabadell	22	8	4	10	37	43	−6	20	
10	Cartagena CF	22	7	5	10	41	51	−10	19	
11	CD Córdoba (R)	22	3	3	16	27	69	−42	9	Qualification for the relegation playoffs
12	Badalona (R)	22	3	2	17	21	84	−63	8	Relegation to Tercera División

Source: BDFútbol
Rules for classification: 1) points; 2) head-to-head points; 3) head-to-head goal difference; 4) goal difference; 5) number of goals scored
(O) Play-off winners; (P) Promoted; (R) Relegated

=== Results ===
Home \ Away	BAD	BET	CÁD	CAR	CAS	CÓR	GER	GRA	LEV	MLC	SAB	XER
Badalona	—	1–0	1–0	3–4	1–9	2–1	2–3	1–3	0–4	2–2	0–0	0–1
Real Betis	9–1	—	1–1	4–0	2–0	4–1	4–3	3–0	1–1	1–0	3–2	1–1
Cádiz	4–1	0–1	—	3–0	4–2	6–0	3–1	1–2	1–1	4–1	4–0	2–3
Cartagena CF	6–0	3–1	4–2	—	1–2	3–1	2–1	0–0	2–3	1–2	3–4	2–4
Castellón	6–0	3–0	2–1	3–3	—	5–2	4–2	1–0	6–4	6–0	1–0	3–0
CD Córdoba	4–2	2–1	2–5	3–1	2–2	—	1–1	1–3	0–3	0–2	1–2	1–3
Gerona	1–0	1–0	2–0	4–0	3–1	6–1	—	1–1	2–0	4–0	1–0	3–0
Granada	8–0	3–0	2–1	1–1	3–0	2–1	1–0	—	2–2	0–1	4–0	3–0
Levante-Gimnástico	6–3	3–2	0–1	6–0	4–2	6–1	4–3	1–0	—	3–0	3–0	1–2
Malacitano	7–1	3–5	3–0	0–1	2–2	4–0	2–1	3–0	3–0	—	2–2	7–0
Sabadell	3–0	3–2	4–2	2–2	0–3	5–1	0–1	1–2	3–2	1–1	—	3–0
Xerez Club	3–0	1–0	1–1	2–2	0–1	1–1	2–1	2–3	1–2	0–0	5–2	—

Source: BDFútbol
Legend: Blue = home team win; Yellow = draw; Red = away team win.

== Promotion playoffs ==
The top two teams in each of the two groups formed a double round-robin playoff group, from which the top two teams would secure automatic promotion, while the other two went into a further playoff round, each drawn against one of the bottom two teams from the 1940–41 Primera División.

=== First round ===
==== League table ====
Pos	Team	Pld	W	D	L	GF	GA	GD	Pts	Qualification or relegation
1	Granada (C, P)	6	4	0	2	10	10	0	8	Promotion to La Liga
2	Real Sociedad (P)	6	3	0	3	15	11	+4	6 (Note: Real Sociedad finished ahead of Deportivo La Coruña on head-to-head points: Real Sociedad–Deportivo La Coruña 2–0, Deportivo La Coruña–Real Sociedad 3–4)	Promotion to La Liga
3	Deportivo La Coruña (O, P)	6	3	0	3	15	11	+4	6	Qualification for the second round
4	Castellón (O, P)	6	2	0	4	9	17	−8	4	Qualification for the second round

Source: BDFútbol
Rules for classification: 1) points; 2) head-to-head points; 3) head-to-head goal difference; 4) goal difference; 5) number of goals scored
(C) Champions; (O) Play-off winners; (P) Promoted

==== Results ====
Home \ Away	CAS	DEP	GRA	RSO
Castellón	—	3–0	0–1	3–0
Deportivo La Coruña	6–0	—	3–1	3–4
Granada	3–2	1–3	—	2–1
Real Sociedad	7–1	2–0	1–2	—

Source: BDFútbol
Legend: Blue = home team win; Yellow = draw; Red = away team win.

=== Second round ===
2 May 1941	Castellón	3–2	Zaragoza	Madrid
	Basilio 5'; Arnau 20'; Hernández 84'	Report	Vilanova 39'; Ameztoy 80'	Stadium: Chamartín; Referee: González Díaz

4 May 1941	Deportivo La Coruña	2–1 (a.e.t.)	Murcia	Madrid
	Chacho 77'; Guimerans 95'	Report	Tito 33'	Stadium: Vallecas; Referee: Escartín

== Relegation playoffs ==
4 May 1941	Baracaldo-Oriamendi	4–3 (a.e.t.)	Langreano	Santander
	Gárate 26', 76', 96', 100'		Zamora 19'; Rada 61'; Gito 119'	Stadium: El Sardinero; Referee: Antón

15 May 1941	CD Córdoba	1–2	Elche	Madrid
				Stadium: Chamartín
