= 1950–51 Copa Federación de España =

Tournament details
- Country: Spain
- Teams: 22

Final positions
- Champions: Córdoba
- Runner-up: Baracaldo

Tournament statistics
- Matches played: 44
- Goals scored: 180 (4.09 per match)

The 1950–51 Copa Federación de España was the third staging (old competition) of the Copa Federación de España, a knockout competition for Spanish football clubs in La Liga and Segunda División.

The competition began on 13 May 1951 and ended with the final on 1 July 1951, where Córdoba became champion after defeating Baracaldo.

== Qualified teams ==
The following teams competed in the 1950–51 Copa Federación de España:

2 teams of 1950–51 La Liga:

- Alcoyano
- Lérida

20 teams of 1950–51 Segunda División:

- Badalona
- Baracaldo
- Cartagena
- Córdoba
- Ferrol
- Gerona
- Gimnástico
- Hércules
- Huesca
- Linense
- Logroñés
- Lucense
- Mallorca
- Mestalla
- Numancia
- Orensana
- Osasuna
- Oviedo
- Plus Ultra
- San Andrés

== Competition ==
=== First round ===
Team 1	Agg.	Team 2	1st leg	2nd leg
Lucense	3–4	Oviedo	3–2	0–2
Plus Ultra	2–4	Logroñés	2–2	0–2
Lérida	7–6	San Andrés	4–1	3–5
Numancia	2–8	Osasuna	1–2	1–6
Ferrol	2–0	Orensana	2–0	0–0
Alcoyano	4–5	Mestalla	4–0	0–5

=== Second round ===
Team 1	Agg.	Team 2	1st leg	2nd leg
Badalona	4–6	Mallorca	4–1	0–5
Gerona	2–5	Lérida	2–2	0–3
Gimnástico	6–6	Mestalla	6–2	0–4
Oviedo	6–3	Ferrol	5–2	1–1
Osasuna	6–3	Huesca	4–0	2–3
Baracaldo	3–2	Logroñés	2–1	1–1
Hércules	3–2	Cartagena	2–1	1–1
Córdoba	7–6	Linense	6–1	1–5

==== Second round replay ====
Team 1	Score	Team 2
Mestalla	3–0	Gimnástico

=== Third round ===
Team 1	Agg.	Team 2	1st leg	2nd leg
Osasuna	5–6	Lérida	5–2	0–4
Oviedo	2–5	Baracaldo	1–3	1–2
Mestalla	3–3	Mallorca	2–1	1–2
Córdoba	5–5	Hércules	4–2	1–3

==== Third round replay ====
Team 1	Score	Team 2
Mestalla	1–0	Mallorca
Córdoba	6–3	Hércules

=== Semi-finals ===
Team 1	Agg.	Team 2	1st leg	2nd leg
Baracaldo	6–3	Lérida	5–2	1–1
Mestalla	1–4	Córdoba	0–1	1–3

=== Final ===
Team 1	Score	Team 2
Córdoba	6–3	Baracaldo
