= 1950–51 Segunda División =

20th season of the second-tier football league in Spain

Segunda División
- Season: 1950–51
- Champions: Real Gijón; Atlético Tetuán
- Promoted: Real Gijón; Atlético Tetuán; Las Palmas; Zaragoza
- Relegated: Gerona; Ceuta; Numancia; Albacete
- Matches: 482
- Goals: 1,884 (3.91 per match)
- Top goalscorer: Paco Campos (29 goals)
- Best goalkeeper: Manuel Sión (0.96 goals/match)
- Biggest home win: Oviedo 9–1 Numancia (5 November 1950); Albacete 8–0 Melilla (31 December 1950)
- Biggest away win: Baracaldo 1–6 Real Gijón (17 September 1950); Gimnástica Torrelavega 2–7 Real Gijón (8 October 1950)
- Highest scoring: Atlético Tetuán 9–2 Mestalla (22 October 1950); Zaragoza 8–3 San Andrés (4 February 1951)

The 1950–51 Segunda División season was the 20th since its establishment and was played between 9 September 1950 and 6 May 1951.

== Overview before the season ==
32 teams joined the league, including two relegated from the 1949–50 La Liga and 6 promoted from the 1949–50 Tercera División.

Relegated from La Liga

- Gimnàstic
- Oviedo

Promoted from Tercera División

- Melilla
- Logroñés
- Las Palmas
- Huesca
- San Andrés
- Ceuta

== Group North ==
=== Teams ===
Location of teams in Segunda División 1950-51 Group North

Club	City	Stadium
CF Badalona	Badalona	Avenida de Navarra
Club Baracaldo	Baracaldo	Lasesarre
Club Ferrol	Ferrol	Inferniño
Gerona CF	Gerona	Vista Alegre
Real Gijón	Gijón	El Molinón
RS Gimnástica de Torrelavega	Torrelavega	El Malecón
Gimnástico de Tarragona	Tarragona	Avenida de Cataluña
UD Huesca	Huesca	San Jorge
CD Logroñés	Logroño	Las Gaunas
SG Lucense	Lugo	Los Miñones
CD Numancia	Soria	San Andrés
UD Orensana	Orense	O Couto
CA Osasuna	Pamplona	San Juan
Real Oviedo CF	Oviedo	Buenavista
CD Sabadell FC	Sabadell	Cruz Alta
CD San Andrés	Barcelona	Santa Coloma
Zaragoza CF	Zaragoza	Torrero

=== League table ===
Pos	Team	Pld	W	D	L	GF	GA	GD	Pts	Promotion, qualification or relegation
1	Real Gijón (P)	32	23	2	7	100	32	+68	48	Promotion to La Liga
2	Zaragoza (O, P)	32	18	6	8	72	43	+29	42	Qualification for the promotion playoffs
3	Sabadell	32	16	6	10	72	59	+13	38	Qualification for the promotion playoffs
4	San Andrés	32	15	5	12	70	76	−6	35 (Note: San Andrés finished ahead of Huesca on head-to-head points: Huesca–San Andrés 0–1, San Andrés–Huesca 4–2)	
5	Huesca	32	15	5	12	65	53	+12	35	
6	Oviedo	32	14	5	13	71	63	+8	33	
7	Osasuna	32	14	3	15	57	61	−4	31	
8	Ferrol	32	13	4	15	40	51	−11	30 (Note: Ferrol finished ahead of Orensana on head-to-head points: Orensana–Ferrol 2–3, Ferrol–Orensana 2–0)	
9	Orensana	32	13	4	15	57	72	−15	30	
10	Logroñés	32	11	7	14	64	66	−2	29 (Note: Logroñés finished ahead of Gimnástica Torrelavega, Baracaldo, Badalona and Lucense on head-to-head points: Logroñés 11 pts, Gimnástica Torrelavega 9 pts, Baracaldo 8 pts, Badalona 6 pts, Lucense 6 pts)	
11	Gimnástica Torrelavega	32	12	5	15	52	75	−23	29	
12	Baracaldo	32	12	5	15	58	64	−6	29	
13	Badalona	32	12	5	15	55	60	−5	29	
14	Lucense	32	11	7	14	49	69	−20	29	
15	Gimnástico	32	12	4	16	56	66	−10	28	
16	Gerona (R)	32	11	5	16	59	64	−5	27	Relegation to Tercera División
17	Numancia (Note: Two points deducted after illegal lineup at their matches against Ferrol and San Andrés) (R)	32	7	8	17	55	78	−23	20	Relegation to Tercera División

Source: BDFútbol
Rules for classification: 1) points; 2) head-to-head points; 3) head-to-head goal difference; 4) goal difference; 5) number of goals scored
(O) Play-off winners; (P) Promoted; (R) Relegated

=== Results ===
Home \ Away	BAD	BAR	NAS	GIM	GIR	HUE	LOG	LUC	NUM	ORE	OSA	OVI	RFE	SPO	SAB	STA	ZAR
Badalona	—	5–1	0–1	4–1	6–3	2–1	2–2	2–2	2–2	3–2	3–0	1–0	5–0	0–3	1–3	2–2	1–1
Baracaldo	2–1	—	2–2	1–2	3–1	1–1	2–1	6–0	4–0	1–0	2–0	4–1	3–0	1–6	7–1	3–1	1–1
Gimnástico	2–3	5–3	—	3–1	2–2	3–1	5–1	4–1	2–0	4–3	4–2	1–3	2–1	0–3	1–1	2–3	1–0
Gimnástica Torrelavega	2–0	5–0	3–1	—	2–0	4–2	2–1	1–1	1–1	4–1	1–4	2–1	2–0	2–7	4–2	1–1	2–1
Gerona	1–0	5–1	0–1	6–1	—	2–2	4–0	0–0	3–1	3–0	4–2	4–1	3–2	4–1	0–0	1–2	1–1
Huesca	3–0	3–0	3–1	1–0	3–1	—	5–0	3–2	6–1	3–3	3–0	2–0	3–2	1–1	6–0	0–1	2–0
Logroñés	3–1	2–0	5–1	1–1	6–3	2–2	—	6–1	2–2	5–0	1–2	0–0	3–1	0–2	3–2	3–1	3–2
Lucense	2–1	0–1	2–1	4–0	3–0	2–1	1–3	—	5–2	0–0	0–1	4–0	1–1	1–0	4–0	2–1	3–1
Numancia	1–2	5–3	4–1	1–1	1–0	1–0	1–1	2–1	—	5–2	3–1	3–4	3–0	1–2	2–2	3–1	2–2
Orensana	4–1	2–2	2–0	2–1	3–1	5–1	2–1	2–1	2–0	—	5–1	0–1	2–3	4–2	1–0	2–0	1–1
Osasuna	0–1	0–0	3–1	8–1	5–2	4–0	3–1	3–3	2–0	2–0	—	3–1	1–0	2–1	1–1	2–1	1–2
Oviedo	3–1	3–2	2–2	5–1	4–1	0–1	4–3	2–2	9–1	2–4	2–1	—	5–0	0–3	5–1	4–0	3–1
Ferrol	2–0	3–0	2–0	2–0	1–0	2–3	3–1	3–0	0–0	2–0	2–1	1–1	—	1–1	1–0	3–0	1–2
Real Gijón	2–1	1–0	3–0	2–0	2–0	3–0	6–1	7–0	6–1	7–0	5–0	3–0	3–1	—	4–1	6–2	6–2
Sabadell	4–0	4–1	2–1	6–1	3–0	3–1	2–1	7–0	5–2	5–2	2–0	6–2	2–0	2–0	—	1–1	1–5
San Andrés	3–4	2–1	2–1	4–3	3–4	4–2	1–0	4–1	4–3	6–1	5–0	3–3	2–0	3–2	1–1	—	3–7
Zaragoza	2–0	1–0	3–1	2–0	2–0	3–0	2–2	4–0	2–1	4–0	4–2	2–0	2–0	1–0	1–2	8–3	—

Source: BDFútbol
Legend: Blue = home team win; Yellow = draw; Red = away team win.

=== Top goalscorers ===
Goalscorers	Goals	Team
(Spain) Francisco Campos	29	Real Gijón
(Spain) José Prendes	28	Real Gijón
(Spain) José Fontanet	24	Gerona
(Spain) Mariano Martín	22	San Andrés
(Spain) Pino	19	Sabadell

=== Top goalkeepers ===
Goalkeeper	Goals	Matches	Average	Team
(Spain) Manuel Sión	30	31	0.97	Real Gijón
(Spain) Goyo	26	21	1.24	Osasuna
(Spain) Candi	37	29	1.28	Zaragoza
(Spain) Zamorita	30	23	1.3	Ferrol
(Spain) Rogelio Lozano	33	24	1.38	Lucense

== Group South ==
=== Teams ===
Location of teams in Segunda División 1950-51 Group South
Canary Islands

Club	City	Stadium
Albacete Balompié	Albacete	Parque de los Mártires
Atlético Tetuán	Tetouan	Varela
Cartagena CF	Cartagena	El Armarjal
SD Ceuta	Ceuta	Alfonso Murube
RCD Córdoba	Córdoba	El Árcangel
Granada CF	Granada	Los Cármenes
Hércules CF	Alicante	La Viña
UD Las Palmas	Las Palmas	Insular
Levante UD	Valencia	Vallejo
RB Linense	La Línea de la Concepción	La Balompédica
RCD Mallorca	Palma de Mallorca	Es Fortí
UD Melilla	Melilla	Álvarez Claro
CD Mestalla	Valencia	Mestalla
AD Plus Ultra	Madrid	Campo de Ciudad Lineal
UD Salamanca	Salamanca	El Calvario

=== League table ===
Pos	Team	Pld	W	D	L	GF	GA	GD	Pts	Promotion, qualification or relegation
1	Atlético Tetuán (P)	28	15	5	8	69	35	+34	35	Promotion to La Liga
2	Salamanca	28	12	8	8	60	47	+13	32	Qualification for the promotion playoffs
3	Las Palmas (O, P)	28	15	1	12	53	47	+6	31	Qualification for the promotion playoffs
4	Hércules	28	12	6	10	66	51	+15	30 (Note: Hércules finished ahead of Real Córdoba and Granada on head-to-head goal difference)	
5	Real Córdoba	28	11	8	9	65	53	+12	30	
6	Granada	28	13	4	11	52	52	0	30	
7	Plus Ultra	28	13	3	12	46	46	0	29 (Note: Plus Ultra finished ahead of Mestalla on head-to-head points: Plus Ultra–Mestalla 2–0, Mestalla–Plus Ultra 1–1)	
8	Mestalla	28	11	7	10	51	51	0	29	
9	Linense	28	13	2	13	53	54	−1	28 (Note: Linense finished ahead of Melilla on head-to-head goal difference: Melilla–Linense 3–1, Linense–Melilla 3–0)	
10	Melilla	28	12	4	12	63	65	−2	28	
11	Cartagena	28	10	7	11	59	68	−9	27	
12	Mallorca	28	11	4	13	61	61	0	26 (Note: Mallorca finished ahead of Levante on overall goal difference)	
13	Levante (O)	28	9	8	11	45	55	−10	26	Qualification for the relegation playoffs
14	Ceuta (R)	28	10	4	14	43	67	−24	24	Relegation to Tercera División
15	Albacete (R)	28	5	5	18	46	80	−34	15	Relegation to Tercera División

Source: BDFútbol
Rules for classification: 1) points; 2) head-to-head points; 3) head-to-head goal difference; 4) goal difference; 5) number of goals scored
(O) Play-off winners; (P) Promoted; (R) Relegated

=== Results ===
Home \ Away	ALB	TET	CAR	CEU	GRA	HER	LPA	LEV	LNS	MAL	MEL	MES	RMC	COR	SAL
Albacete	—	3–1	1–4	6–0	1–3	4–1	0–0	2–0	1–3	1–1	8–0	0–1	1–2	1–1	1–1
Atlético Tetuán	5–0	—	6–2	3–0	5–1	3–0	2–1	4–0	3–2	3–0	0–1	9–2	1–0	1–1	4–0
Cartagena	3–1	2–1	—	4–1	3–1	2–2	2–4	2–2	4–1	2–1	6–3	4–1	1–1	1–1	4–0
Ceuta	1–0	0–0	3–1	—	3–3	1–1	2–1	1–1	2–1	4–1	2–1	5–3	3–1	2–1	5–2
Granada	2–1	1–1	5–2	1–0	—	2–0	4–1	3–1	2–1	4–0	2–3	0–0	2–0	2–1	3–2
Hércules	6–1	3–4	3–2	3–1	5–0	—	2–1	3–1	0–1	5–0	4–1	4–1	5–1	2–2	4–0
Las Palmas	6–0	1–0	4–1	5–1	3–1	2–1	—	3–2	3–1	0–2	3–2	2–0	1–0	1–3	3–0
Levante	4–0	3–2	2–2	1–0	2–0	0–2	1–0	—	3–0	3–3	2–0	2–0	3–0	1–1	2–2
Linense	3–3	3–2	3–0	3–0	2–1	3–1	1–3	3–0	—	3–2	3–0	1–2	2–0	4–1	4–0
Mallorca	6–1	2–2	6–1	4–0	0–3	4–2	2–1	1–1	3–1	—	4–2	0–1	4–0	3–1	2–1
Melilla	6–1	1–2	1–1	4–1	2–2	6–1	3–0	5–2	3–1	4–2	—	2–1	4–2	3–2	2–2
Mestalla	6–2	1–2	7–0	3–2	4–1	1–1	3–1	1–1	3–0	4–3	2–2	—	1–1	2–0	1–1
Plus Ultra	3–2	2–1	2–1	5–1	4–0	3–1	0–2	5–1	3–0	3–2	2–1	2–0	—	1–0	2–2
Real Córdoba	6–4	3–2	1–1	4–1	3–2	3–3	4–1	6–2	7–1	4–3	6–1	0–0	2–0	—	1–3
Salamanca	5–0	0–0	4–1	4–1	2–1	1–1	7–0	4–2	2–2	4–0	1–0	3–0	2–1	5–0	—

Source: BDFútbol
Legend: Blue = home team win; Yellow = draw; Red = away team win.

=== Top goalscorers ===
Goalscorers	Goals	Team
(Spain) Manolín	28	Atlético Tetuán
(Spain) Loren	21	Salamanca
(Spain) Manolo Belenguer	19	Mallorca
(Spain) Lolo	18	Hércules
(Spain) Abilio Rubio	17	Albacete

=== Top goalkeepers ===
Goalkeeper	Goals	Matches	Average	Team
(Spain) Manuel Pachón	35	28	1.25	Atlético Tetuán
(Spain) Adauto Iglesias	28	20	1.4	Plus Ultra
(Spain) José García	43	26	1.65	Mestalla
(Spain) César Larrarte	44	26	1.69	Salamanca
(Spain) Manuel Montes	43	25	1.72	Las Palmas

== Promotion playoffs ==
=== League table ===
Pos	Team	Pld	W	D	L	GF	GA	GD	Pts	Promotion or relegation
1	Las Palmas	10	8	0	2	26	11	+15	16	Promotion to La Liga
2	Zaragoza	10	7	1	2	31	16	+15	15 (Note: Zaragoza finished ahead of Málaga on head-to-head goal difference: Zaragoza–Málaga 6–2, Málaga–Zaragoza 4–2)	Promotion to La Liga
3	Málaga (R)	10	7	1	2	34	18	+16	15	
4	Murcia (R)	10	3	0	7	23	33	−10	6	
5	Sabadell	10	2	1	7	14	25	−11	5	
6	Salamanca	10	1	1	8	8	33	−25	3	

Source: BDFútbol
Rules for classification: 1) points; 2) head-to-head points; 3) head-to-head goal difference; 4) goal difference; 5) number of goals scored
(R) Relegated

=== Results ===
Home \ Away	LPA	CDM	MUR	SAB	SAL	ZAR
Las Palmas	—	4–1	6–1	2–0	2–1	2–0
Málaga	2–0	—	5–2	4–0	6–0	4–2
Murcia	2–5	1–5	—	5–2	6–2	1–4
Sabadell	1–2	2–2	1–0	—	3–0	2–4
Salamanca	0–2	1–3	0–3	3–2	—	1–1
Zaragoza	3–1	6–2	3–2	3–1	5–0	—

Source: BDFútbol
Legend: Blue = home team win; Yellow = draw; Red = away team win.

== Relegation playoffs ==
13 May 1951	UD Tenerife	1–0	Levante	Santa Cruz de Tenerife
	Lorencito 8'	Report		Stadium: Heliodoro Rodríguez López; Referee: Guerra Prieto

27 May 1951	Levante	3–1 (3–2 agg.)	UD Tenerife	Valencia
	Amat 11'; Lahuerta 71'; Moreno 79' (pen.)	Report	Pedrín 49'	Stadium: Vallejo; Referee: Balcells Regué
