= Iriberri =

Iriberri is a Spanish surname. Notable people with the surname include:

- Hernando Iriberri (born 1960), Filipino retired soldier
- Imanol Iriberri (born 1987), Argentine footballer
- Luis Aranaz Iriberri (1914–1981), Spanish footballer and manager
