= Alfredo Espiga =

Spanish footballer

Personal information
- Full name: Alfredo Espiga Rovira
- Date of birth: 11 October 1923
- Place of birth: Badalona, Spain
- Date of death: 22 August 1951 (aged 27)
- Place of death: Maastricht, Netherlands
- Position: Midfielder

Senior career*
| Years | Team | Apps | (Gls) |
| 1947–1951 | Sabadell | 79 | (0) |
| Total | | 79 | (0) |
- * Club domestic league appearances and goals

Alfredo Espiga Rovira (11 October 1923 – 22 August 1951) was a Spanish footballer who played as a midfielder.

Born in Badalona, Catalonia, he played for CE Sabadell FC. He made his professional debut on 21 September 1947 in the first game of the La Liga season, a 2–2 home draw against neighbours Gimnàstic de Tarragona. He totalled 21 appearances that season, and 20 in the following campaign which ended in relegation. In all, Espiga played 89 games for the Arlequinats, including all ten of their promotion play-off games in 1950–51.

On their pre-season tour of the Netherlands, he was killed at the age of 27 when the car he was driven in collided with a tree near Maastricht; the three others in the car, amongst them two Spanish consular staff, were injured.
