= Luis Aranaz =

Spanish footballer and manager (1914–1981)

Personal information
- Full name: Luis Aranaz Iriberri
- Date of birth: 19 August 1914
- Place of birth: Estella, Spain
- Date of death: 12 April 1981 (aged 66)
- Place of death: Spain
- Position: Midfielder

Senior career*
Years	Team	Apps	(Gls)
1934–1935	Real Betis	0	(0)
1935–1936	Osasuna	17	(0)
1939–1942	Osasuna	57	(6)
1942–1946	Sabadell	45	(3)
1946–1947	Real Murcia	10	(0)
1947–1949	Logroñés		

International career
1937	Spain (unofficial)	1	(0)
1943–1944	Catalonia	3	(0)

Managerial career
- 1956–1957: Logroñés
- 1964–1966: Osasuna
- * Club domestic league appearances and goals

Luis Aranaz Iriberri (19 August 1914 – 12 April 1981) was a Spanish footballer who played as a midfielder for CA Osasuna, Sabadell, and Real Murcia in the 1930s and 1940s.

== Early life ==
Born in the Navarre town of Estella on 19 August 1914, Aranaz moved to Pamplona with his family at age 12.

== Club career ==
Aranaz began his career at Real Betis in 1934, aged 20. Despite failing to make a single league appearance for the club, he is nonetheless considered a member of the squad that won the 1934–35 La Liga title, the first (and only) league title in the history of Betis. He joined fellow top flight club Osasuna in 1935, but his career was then interrupted by the outbreak of the Spanish Civil War in 1936.

Once the conflict was over, Aranaz returned to Osasuna, where he played for a further three years until 1942, when Segunda División side Sabadell signed him for 25,000 pesetas. He became the team's captain and helped Sabadell win the second division title in 1942–43, continuing as a starter in the following season. He led his side to the quarterfinals of the 1944 Copa del Generalísimo against Valencia, sustaining a double fracture of the tibia and fibula in the first half of the tie at Creu Alta, which ruled him out of both that season and the next. Without him, the club was relegated back to the second division. In August 1945, Aranaz (who was not yet fully recovered from the injury) received an offer from Valencia, then in the top flight, but Sabadell prevented this deal from coming to fruition. In his first official match since his injury, Aranaz played ten minutes to assist a goal, remaining a starter from then on and leading Sabadell to another second division title in 1945–46. He stayed at Sabadell for four years, from 1942 until 1946, scoring a total of five goals in 79 official matches.

In 1946, Aranaz signed for top-flight club Real Murcia, with whom he played for one season, until 1947, when he went to Logroñés, where he retired in 1949, aged 35. In total, he scored two goals in 48 La Liga matches for three clubs. After retiring, he worked as a coach, taking over his former clubs Logroñés (1956–57) and Osasuna (1964–66).

== International career ==
On 28 November 1937, Aranaz played for Spain in an unofficial match against Portugal in Galicia, the home region of General Franco, who arranged this match because he saw football as a propaganda tool; Spain lost 2–1, partly because its squad had been hastily assembled from the best available players in Nationalist areas, including Aranaz.

As a Sabadell player, Aranaz was eligible to play for the Catalan national team, playing three matches between October 1943 and April 1944. The latter ended in a 2–2 draw with Valencian national team.

== Death ==
In 1971, Aranaz received the title of adopted son of the city of Sabadell. He died on 12 April 1981, at the age of 66.

== Honours ==
Sabadell

- Segunda División: 1942–43, 1945–46
