= Juan Araujo =

Spanish footballer

Juan Araujo Pino
Personal information
- Full name: Juan Araujo Pino
- Date of birth: 24 November 1920
- Place of birth: La Carolina, Jaen, Spain
- Date of death: 4 November 2002 (aged 81)
- Place of death: Seville, Spain
- Position: Striker

Youth career
- Sevilla

Senior career*
Years	Team	Apps	(Gls)
1943–1945	→ Xerez (loan)	50	(43)
1943–1956	Sevilla	207	(139)
1956–1957	Córdoba	28	(28)
1957–1958	Xerez C.D.	24	(16)
Total		309	(226)
- * Club domestic league appearances and goals

Juan Araujo Pino (24 November 1920, La Carolina, Jaen, Spain – 4 November 2002, Seville, Spain) was a Spanish footballer who played as a striker. His first club was Xerez FC.

== Career ==
Araugo began his career playing in the amateur team of Sevilla, moving to Xerez FC on loan in 1943, winning consecutive Segunda División Pichichi Trophies, the award for the league's top scorer, with 21 goals in 26 appearances in 1943–44 and 22 goals in 24 appearances in 1944–45. Two years later he returned to Sevilla, with whom he won the league in the 1945–46 season; an own goal allowed the club to win the title ahead of Barcelona. Two years later, he was proclaimed champion of the Copa del Generalissimo. He remained at the club until 1956, for eleven consecutive years, during which he played 207 league games and scored 139 goals. After his time at the Seville club, he went to Córdoba CF, where he played until 1957. His last stage as a professional was spent at Xerez Computer D., after which he retired in 1958.

== Clubs ==
- 1943–1945: Xerez F. C., Spain
- 1945–1956: Sevilla F.C., Spain
- 1956–1957: Córdoba C.F., Spain
- 1957–1958: Xerez C.D., Spain

== Honours ==
=== Club ===
Sevilla

- Spanish La Liga: 1945–46
- Copa del Generalísimo: 1948

=== Individual ===
- Segunda División Top-Scorer (2): 1943–44 (21 goals), 1944–45 (22 goals)
