= UD Salamanca =

Salamanca
- Full name: Unión Deportiva Salamanca, S.A.D.
- Nicknames: Charros; Unionistas
- Founded: 9 February 1923; 103 years ago
- Dissolved: 18 June 2013; 13 years ago
- Ground: Estadio Helmántico
- Capacity: 17,341
- League: Unregistered
- 2012–13: 2ª B – Group 1, 8th
Home colours	Away colours	Third colours

Unión Deportiva Salamanca, S.A.D. (Spanish pronunciation: [uˈnjon depoɾˈtiβa salaˈmaŋka]) was a historical Spanish football team based in Salamanca, in the autonomous community of Castile and León.

Founded on 9 February 1923 and nicknamed Los Charros, the club played in white shirts and black shorts, holding home games at Estadio Helmántico, which seated 17,341 spectators.

== History ==
Initially formed by Irish students, Salamanca first played in early Spanish championships in 1907, before an official league was founded later on. On 16 March 1923, at the tables of Café Novelty, situated in the Plaza Mayor, Dionisio Ridruejo set the club's early official foundations and, from 1939 and during the following three decades, it fluctuated between the third and the second levels of the Spanish football league.

In the 1974–75 season, Salamanca made its La Liga debuts, overachieving for a final 7th position (out of 18 teams), which eventually would be its best classification ever. The team lasted in the topflight until 1981, mainly coached by José Luis García Traid, then returned the following year for a further two seasons, being further relegated to Segunda División B – the new third division created in 1977 – in 1984–85, and spending three years in that category before promoting back.

In 1994–95's second division, after finishing fourth in the league, Salamanca lost the first leg of the promotion/relegation playoffs against Albacete Balompié, 0–2 at home, but won 5–0 away, returning to the main level after eleven years. The club was managed by 29-year-old Juan Manuel Lillo, also in charge for the following season, as the Castile and León club ranked 22nd and last in the top level.

From 1999 onwards (with two more visits to the first division, with 15th and 20th-place finishes respectively), Salamanca stabilized in the second level, save for the 2005–06 season spent in the third division, with the club winning the regular season and promoting in the playoffs. Veteran Quique Martín was arguably the most important player of the club in the decade, whilst Argentine Jorge D'Alessandro, who held the record for most games in the top division in the club's history, worked with the team as a manager in a further two spells (three in total).

2010–11 brought a club record ten consecutive defeats between December 2010/February 2011, and two coaching changes, as Salamanca returned to the third division after five years. On 18 June 2013, 90 years after its foundation, the club was liquidated due to the accumulation of unpaid debts.

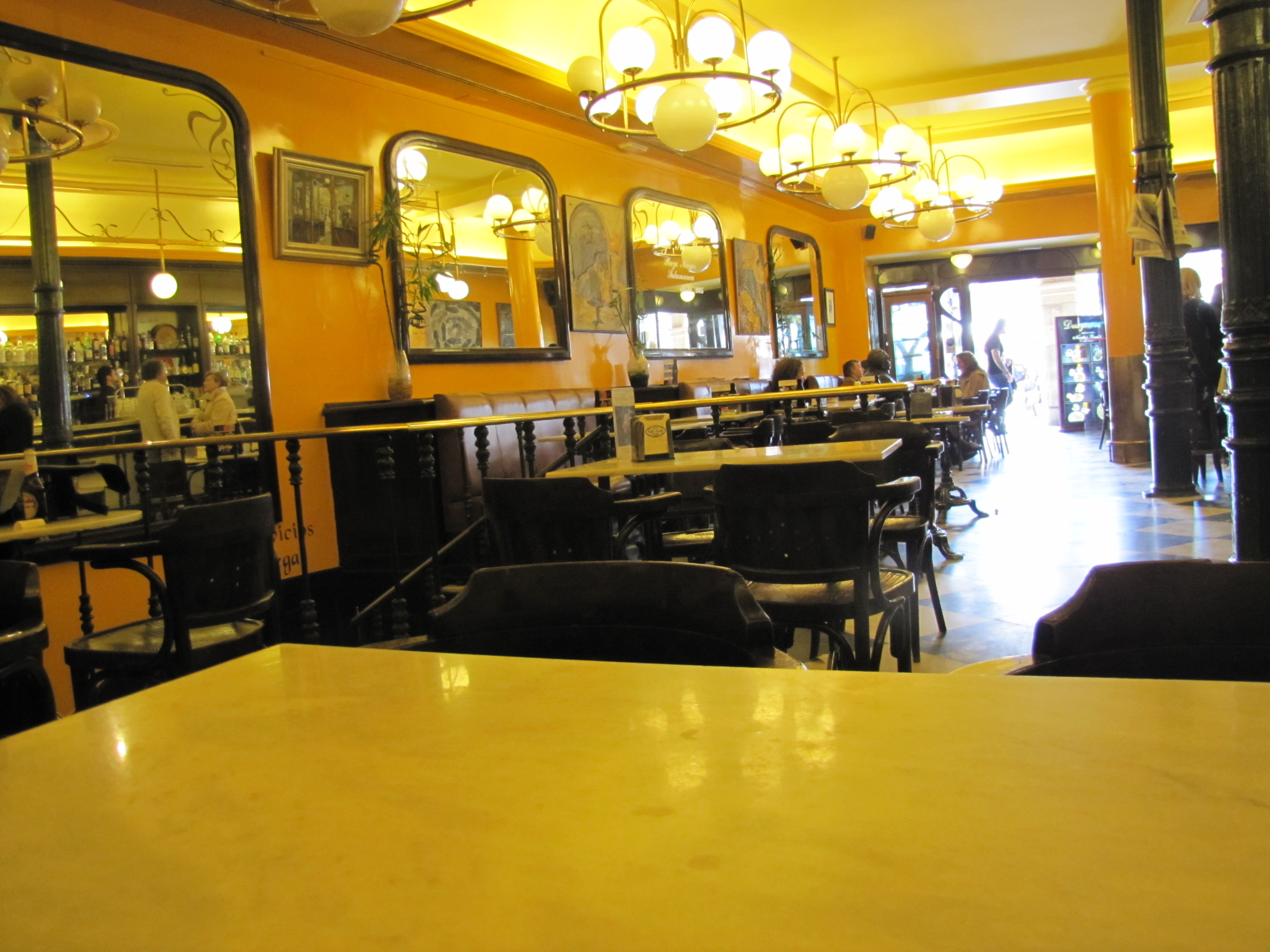
Café Novelty: Salamanca's official beginnings were set here, in 1923.

=== Club background ===
- Unión Deportiva Salamanca – (1923–2013)
- Salamanca Athletic Club – (2013–2016) did not play in any matches
- Salamanca Club de Fútbol UDS – (2013–)
- Unionistas de Salamanca Club de Fútbol – (2013–)

== Honours ==
- Castilla-León Championship:
  - Winners (1): 1923–24

== Season to season ==
Season	Tier	Division	Place	Copa del Rey
1935–36	3	Regional		Group stage
1939–40	2	2ª	5th	
1940–41	2	2ª	7th	First round
1941–42	2	2ª	2nd	First round
1942–43	2	2ª	8th	First round
1943–44	3	3ª	3rd	First round
1944–45	3	3ª	1st	
1945–46	2	2ª	13th	First round
1946–47	3	3ª	2nd	
1947–48	3	3ª	1st	Second round
1948–49	3	3ª	2nd	Fifth round
1949–50	2	2ª	4th	First round
1950–51	2	2ª	2nd	
1951–52	2	2ª	7th	
1952–53	2	2ª	13th	First round
1953–54	2	2ª	15th	
1954–55	3	3ª	2nd	
1955–56	3	3ª	1st	
1956–57	3	3ª	1st	
1957–58	3	3ª	3rd	

Season	Tier	Division	Place	Copa del Rey
1958–59	3	3ª	2nd	
1959–60	3	3ª	2nd	
1960–61	2	2ª	10th	First round
1961–62	2	2ª	12th	First round
1962–63	2	2ª	11th	First round
1963–64	2	2ª	15th	First round
1964–65	3	3ª	1st	
1965–66	3	3ª	3rd	
1966–67	3	3ª	1st	
1967–68	3	3ª	2nd	
1968–69	3	3ª	1st	
1969–70	2	2ª	19th	Round of 32
1970–71	3	3ª	10th	Third round
1971–72	3	3ª	2nd	First round
1972–73	3	3ª	1st	Second round
1973–74	2	2ª	3rd	Fourth round
1974–75	1	1ª	7th	Fourth round
1975–76	1	1ª	9th	Fourth round
1976–77	1	1ª	12th	Semifinals
1977–78	1	1ª	9th	First round

Season	Tier	Division	Place	Copa del Rey
1978–79	1	1ª	10th	Round of 16
1979–80	1	1ª	11th	Fourth round
1980–81	1	1ª	17th	Quarter-finals
1981–82	2	2ª	2nd	Round of 16
1982–83	1	1ª	13th	Round of 16
1983–84	1	1ª	18th	Third round
1984–85	2	2ª	17th	Second round
1985–86	3	2ª B	3rd	Second round
1986–87	3	2ª B	5th	Third round
1987–88	3	2ª B	1st	Fourth round
1988–89	2	2ª	7th	Second round
1989–90	2	2ª	13th	First round
1990–91	2	2ª	18th	Fourth round
1991–92	3	2ª B	1st	Second round
1992–93	3	2ª B	2nd	Third round
1993–94	3	2ª B	1st	Fourth round
1994–95	2	2ª	4th	Second round
1995–96	1	1ª	22nd	Third round

Season	Tier	Division	Place	Copa del Rey
1996–97	2	2ª	2nd	Second round
1997–98	1	1ª	15th	Third round
1998–99	1	1ª	20th	Third round
1999–2000	2	2ª	4th	First round
2000–01	2	2ª	9th	Round of 64
2001–02	2	2ª	11th	Round of 16
2002–03	2	2ª	7th	Round of 64
2003–04	2	2ª	11th	Round of 32
2004–05	2	2ª	21st	Round of 64
2005–06	3	2ª B	1st	Second round
2006–07	2	2ª	12th	Second round
2007–08	2	2ª	7th	Second round
2008–09	2	2ª	9th	Third round
2009–10	2	2ª	16th	Round of 32
2010–11	2	2ª	19th	Second round
2011–12	3	2ª B	9th	Second round
2012–13	3	2ª B	8th	

- 12 seasons in La Liga
- 34 seasons in Segunda División
- 9 seasons in Segunda División B
- 19 seasons in Tercera División

== Last squad ==
Numbers taken from the official website: www.udsalamanca.es and www.lfp.es

Note: Flags indicate national team as defined under FIFA eligibility rules; some limited exceptions apply. Players may hold more than one non-FIFA nationality.

No.	Pos.	Nation	Player
1	GK	ESP	Adrián Murcia
2	DF	ESP	Iban Zubiaurre
3	DF	ESP	Raúl Fuster
4	MF	ESP	Rubén García
5	DF	ESP	Pol Bueso
6	DF	ESP	José Ángel
7	FW	ESP	Piojo
8	MF	ESP	Víctor Andrés
9	FW	BRA	Igor
10	MF	ESP	Pablo de Lucas

No.	Pos.	Nation	Player
11	MF	ESP	Javi Hernández
13	GK	ESP	Raúl Moreno
14	FW	ESP	Coque
15	FW	ESP	Aitor Pons
16	DF	POR	João Faria
18	DF	ESP	José Rodríguez
20	MF	ESP	David Lázaro
21	FW	ESP	Borja Sánchez
22	MF	GNB	Almami Moreira

== Players ==
See Category:UD Salamanca footballers
