= 1945–46 Segunda División =

15th season of the second-tier football league in Spain

Segunda División
- Season: 1945–46
- Champions: Sabadell
- Promoted: Sabadell; Deportivo La Coruña
- Relegated: Jerez; Salamanca; Ceuta
- Matches: 182
- Goals: 605 (3.32 per match)
- Top goalscorer: José Saras; Mariano Uceda (20 goals)
- Best goalkeeper: Juan Acuña (1.08 goals/match)
- Biggest home win: Real Santander 6–0 Gimnástico (30 September 1945); Ferrol 6–0 Real Córdoba (2 December 1945); Gimnástico 6–0 Zaragoza (31 March 1946)
- Biggest away win: Jerez 0–7 Real Sociedad (21 October 1945)
- Highest scoring: Sabadell 7–2 Jerez (7 October 1945); Granada 6–3 Ferrol (27 January 1946)

The 1945–46 Segunda División season was the 15th since its establishment and was played between 23 September 1945 and 31 March 1946.

== Overview before the season ==
14 teams joined the league, including three relegated from the 1944–45 La Liga and three promoted from the 1944–45 Tercera División.

Relegated from La Liga

- Granada
- Sabadell
- Deportivo La Coruña

Promoted from Tercera División

- Gimnástico
- Salamanca
- Real Córdoba

== Teams ==
Location of teams in Segunda División 1945-46

Club	City	Stadium
Real Betis Balompié	Seville	Heliópolis
SD Ceuta	Ceuta	Campo de Deporte
RCD Córdoba	Córdoba	El Arcángel
RC Deportivo La Coruña	La Coruña	Riazor
Club Ferrol	Ferrol	Inferniño
Gimnástico de Tarragona	Tarragona	Avenida de Cataluña
Granada CF	Granada	Los Cármenes
Jerez FC	Jerez de la Frontera	Domecq
CD Mallorca	Palma de Mallorca	Es Fortí
Real Sociedad	San Sebastián	Atocha
CD Sabadell FC	Sabadell	Cruz Alta
UD Salamanca	Salamanca	El Calvario
Real Santander SD	Santander	El Sardinero
Zaragoza FC	Zaragoza	Torrero

== League table ==
Pos	Team	Pld	W	D	L	GF	GA	GD	Pts	Promotion, qualification or relegation
1	Sabadell (C, P)	26	14	7	5	50	29	+21	35	Promotion to La Liga
2	Deportivo La Coruña (P)	26	14	5	7	38	28	+10	33	Promotion to La Liga
3	Gimnástico	26	12	5	9	50	46	+4	29 (Note: Gimnástico finished ahead of Granada and Real Córdoba on head-to-head points: Gimnástico 5 pts, Granada 5 pts, Real Córdoba 2 pts)	Qualification for the promotion playoffs
4	Granada	26	12	5	9	49	35	+14	29	
5	Real Córdoba	26	13	3	10	36	34	+2	29	
6	Real Sociedad	26	12	3	11	46	33	+13	27	
7	Ferrol	26	10	5	11	39	52	−13	25 (Note: Ferrol finished ahead of Mallorca on head-to-head points: Mallorca–Ferrol 0–1, Ferrol–Mallorca 1–1)	
8	Mallorca	26	8	9	9	37	39	−2	25	
9	Real Santander	26	11	2	13	56	51	+5	24 (Note: Real Santander finished ahead of Zaragoza and Real Betis on head-to-head goal difference)	
10	Zaragoza	26	10	4	12	44	53	−9	24	
11	Real Betis	26	10	4	12	41	40	+1	24	
12	Jerez (R)	26	9	4	13	43	59	−16	22	Qualification for the relegation playoffs, Then Dissolved After Losing
13	Salamanca (R)	26	8	4	14	41	48	−7	20	Relegation to Tercera División
14	Ceuta (R)	26	8	2	16	35	58	−23	18	Relegation to Tercera División

Source: BDFútbol
Rules for classification: 1) points; 2) head-to-head points; 3) head-to-head goal difference; 4) goal difference; 5) number of goals scored
(C) Champions; (P) Promoted; (R) Relegated

== Results ==
Home \ Away	CEU	DEP	GIM	GRA	MAL	COR	RFE	RAC	BET	RSO	SAB	SAL	XER	ZAR
Ceuta	—	1–2	1–1	2–3	4–0	1–2	1–2	1–3	2–1	2–1	5–2	1–0	2–1	3–0
Deportivo La Coruña	3–0	—	1–3	1–1	2–2	1–0	3–1	3–1	1–0	1–0	2–0	3–3	4–1	5–2
Gimnástico	4–1	2–0	—	3–3	1–1	5–1	1–0	4–1	4–1	2–4	0–1	3–0	1–1	6–0
Granada	2–0	1–2	2–1	—	1–2	2–0	6–3	2–0	0–1	4–1	2–2	4–1	4–1	3–1
Mallorca	1–2	0–0	3–0	3–2	—	1–0	0–1	4–2	2–2	1–1	0–2	2–0	3–0	1–1
Real Córdoba	4–1	2–0	0–1	2–0	1–0	—	3–0	4–2	2–0	3–0	0–0	1–1	3–0	2–0
Ferrol	1–1	0–1	0–2	1–0	1–1	6–0	—	2–1	2–2	2–2	3–1	4–2	3–2	1–0
Real Santander	4–0	0–1	6–0	3–2	3–1	1–2	2–2	—	4–0	4–0	2–2	4–2	2–1	4–2
Real Betis	2–1	1–0	6–1	1–2	2–3	2–3	4–0	3–2	—	1–0	0–1	3–0	2–2	4–0
Real Sociedad	4–0	2–0	5–0	1–1	2–1	3–1	4–0	0–1	3–1	—	0–2	1–0	2–0	1–2
Sabadell	3–1	2–0	3–1	0–0	1–1	2–0	2–3	5–0	0–0	1–0	—	5–1	7–2	1–1
Salamanca	4–1	0–0	1–3	0–1	3–1	0–0	6–1	2–1	0–1	2–0	3–1	—	2–0	4–1
Jerez	3–0	2–0	4–1	1–0	1–1	4–0	1–0	4–3	1–0	0–7	1–2	4–3	—	4–4
Zaragoza	5–1	1–2	0–0	2–1	4–2	1–0	4–0	2–0	4–1	1–2	1–2	2–1	3–2	—

Source: BDFútbol
Legend: Blue = home team win; Yellow = draw; Red = away team win.

== Top goalscorers ==
Goalscorers	Goals	Team
(Spain) José Saras	20	Real Santander
(Spain) Mariano Uceda	20	Zaragoza
(Spain) Luis Barceló	14	Gimnástico
(Spain) Antonio Vázquez	13	Sabadell
(Spain) Trompi	13	Granada

== Top goalkeepers ==
Goalkeeper	Goals	Matches	Average	Team
(Spain) Juan Acuña	28	26	1.08	Deportivo La Coruña
(Spain) Ricardo Pujol	29	26	1.12	Sabadell
(Spain) Luis Martín	27	24	1.13	Real Córdoba
(Spain) Román Galarraga	28	23	1.22	Real Sociedad
(Spain) José María Martí	28	20	1.4	Granada

== Promotion playoffs ==
19 May 1946	Espanyol	0–0 (a.e.t.)	Gimnástico	Barcelona
		Report		Stadium: Montjuïc; Referee: De la Riva Bastos

26 May 1946	Espanyol	3–0	Gimnástico	Barcelona
	Diego 34'; Hernández 42'; Calvo 82'	Report		Stadium: Montjuïc; Referee: De la Riva Bastos

== Relegation playoffs ==
29 June 1946	Barakaldo	2–0 (a.e.t.)	Jerez	Madrid
	Gárate 107', 117'	Report		Stadium: Metropolitano; Referee: Álvarez Pérez
