= 1949–50 Tercera División =

Tercera División
- Season: 1949–50

The 1949–50 Tercera División was the 14th edition of the Spanish third national tier.

== Format ==
90 clubs in 5 geographic groups of 18 participated this season. The group winners and runners up (10 clubs) progressed to the Final Phase. These 10 clubs were joined by Las Palmas and Tenerife who were not officially members of the Tercera División. Two groups of 6 were formed with clubs playing home and away (10 matches). The winners and runners up of each group (4 clubs) were promoted to the Segunda División. The third and fourth placed teams participated in promotion/relegation play-offs against the teams finishing 14th and 15th in the North and South groups of the Segunda División.

== Regular season ==
=== Group 1 ===
Pos	Team	Pld	W	D	L	GF	GA	GD	Pts	Qualification or relegation
1	Caudal Deportivo	34	22	6	6	106	46	+60	50	Final Phase
2	Real Avilés CF	34	22	2	10	99	47	+52	46	Final Phase
3	Real Juvencia	34	17	7	10	79	48	+31	41	
4	CD Juvenil	34	20	0	14	79	58	+21	40	
5	Cultural Leonesa	34	16	6	12	78	70	+8	38	
6	CDFN Palencia	34	17	3	14	64	65	−1	37	
7	CD Naval	34	18	0	16	80	80	0	36	
8	CP La Felguera	34	16	4	14	70	75	−5	36	
9	Pontevedra CF	34	15	4	15	76	75	+1	34	
10	C. Langreano	34	15	3	16	67	88	−21	33	
11	C. Santiago	34	13	5	16	59	66	−7	31	
12	At. Zamora	34	13	4	17	79	77	+2	30	
13	Club Lemos	34	13	4	17	64	74	−10	30	
14	C. Arsenal Ferrol	34	11	6	17	58	80	−22	28	
15	Barreda Balompié	34	13	2	19	82	87	−5	28	
16	SD Ponferradina	34	11	6	17	54	73	−19	28	Relegation phase
17	Rayo Cantabria	34	10	8	16	53	80	−27	28	Relegation phase
18	Club Berbés	34	7	4	23	64	122	−58	18	Relegation phase

=== Group 2 ===
Pos	Team	Pld	W	D	L	GF	GA	GD	Pts	Qualification or relegation
1	UD Huesca	34	21	6	7	82	51	+31	48	Final Phase
2	CD Logroñés	34	20	7	7	74	39	+35	47	Final Phase
3	Arenas Club Guecho	34	17	9	8	67	54	+13	43	
4	Arenas SD Zaragoza	34	18	5	11	83	53	+30	41	
5	CD Calatayud	34	15	8	11	73	83	−10	38	
6	CD Guecho	34	14	8	12	71	63	+8	36	
7	Club Sestao	34	14	8	12	52	49	+3	36	
8	SD Indauchu	34	14	7	13	61	66	−5	35	
9	SD Escoriaza	34	15	4	15	80	66	+14	34	
10	CD Alavés	34	12	9	13	66	50	+16	33	
11	CA Zaragoza	34	13	7	14	72	59	+13	33	
12	CD Tudelano	34	13	6	15	55	73	−18	32	
13	CD Mirandés	34	10	11	13	62	76	−14	31	
14	Dep. Maest. Aérea Logr.	34	12	6	16	55	59	−4	30	
15	CD Izarra	34	9	9	16	53	71	−18	27	
16	C.D. Calahorra	34	8	8	18	37	69	−32	24	Relegation phase
17	Real Unión Club	34	8	8	18	44	84	−40	24	Relegation phase
18	Burgos CF	34	8	4	22	42	64	−22	20	Relegation phase

=== Group 3 ===
Pos	Team	Pld	W	D	L	GF	GA	GD	Pts	Qualification or relegation
1	CD San Andrés	34	23	3	8	117	56	+61	49	Final Phase
2	CD Tortosa	34	21	4	9	107	50	+57	46	Final Phase
3	CD Olímpico Játiva	34	21	2	11	86	53	+33	44	
4	CD Manacor	34	19	6	9	69	43	+26	44	
5	CD Mataró	34	19	2	13	83	65	+18	40	
6	CD Segarra	34	18	3	13	77	54	+23	39	
7	CD Atlético Baleares	34	18	3	13	94	80	+14	39	
8	CD Tarrasa	34	17	4	13	88	65	+23	38	
9	UD San Martín	34	16	6	12	90	69	+21	38	
10	CD Granollers	34	17	1	16	98	76	+22	35	
11	Catarroja CF	34	16	3	15	74	87	−13	35	
12	Reus Deportivo	34	15	4	15	72	75	−3	34	
13	CD Júpiter	34	15	2	17	70	81	−11	32	
14	UD Sans	34	11	5	18	56	86	−30	27	
15	CD Constancia	34	11	3	20	83	105	−22	25	
16	CF Igualada	34	9	5	20	67	100	−33	23	Relegation phase
17	CD Acero	34	8	2	24	49	107	−58	18	Relegation phase
18	SD Sueca	34	2	2	30	25	153	−128	6	Relegation phase

=== Group 4 ===
Pos	Team	Pld	W	D	L	GF	GA	GD	Pts	Qualification or relegation
1	CD Toledo	34	20	7	7	112	65	+47	47	Final Phase
2	Imperial CF	34	19	6	9	108	64	+44	44	Final Phase
3	CD Naval	34	16	7	11	80	53	+27	39	
4	CD Manchego	34	18	3	13	73	56	+17	39	
5	Ávila CF	34	17	4	13	82	77	+5	38	
6	Orihuela Deportiva CF	34	18	1	15	83	83	0	37	
7	Tomelloso CF	34	16	4	14	51	55	−4	36	
8	Guadalajara CF	34	16	4	14	77	76	+1	36	
9	Alicante CF	34	15	3	16	64	81	−17	33	
10	San Javier CF	34	13	7	14	54	56	−2	33	
11	CD Cieza	34	13	6	15	68	75	−7	32	
12	CD Talavera	34	15	2	17	72	83	−11	32	
13	RSD Alcalá	34	14	4	16	79	69	+10	32	
14	AD Rayo Vallecano	34	13	5	16	61	80	−19	31	
15	CD Eldense	34	14	1	19	70	78	−8	29	
16	UB Conquense	34	12	3	19	67	85	−18	27	Relegation phase
17	Villena CF	34	8	10	16	58	88	−30	26	Relegation phase
18	CD Valdepeñas	34	8	5	21	59	94	−35	21	Relegation phase

=== Group 5 ===
Pos	Team	Pld	W	D	L	GF	GA	GD	Pts	Qualification or relegation
1	SD Ceuta	34	22	6	6	115	43	+72	50	Final Phase
2	UD Melilla	34	23	3	8	99	45	+54	49	Final Phase
3	Real Betis Balompié	34	19	6	9	90	51	+39	44	
4	RC Recreativo Huelva	34	19	5	10	86	63	+23	43	
5	CD Iliturgi	34	16	8	10	76	49	+27	40	
6	CD San Fernando	34	19	2	13	89	61	+28	40	
7	Jerez CD	34	18	1	15	72	63	+9	37	
8	Cádiz CF	34	15	7	12	70	68	+2	37	
9	C. Maghreb el Aksa	34	16	3	15	73	71	+2	35	
10	Algeciras CF	34	13	9	12	72	84	−12	35	
11	R. Jaén CF	34	12	7	15	57	65	−8	31	
12	UD Almería	34	14	2	18	77	80	−3	30	
13	CD Badajoz	34	13	4	17	63	79	−16	30	
14	CD Cacereño	34	12	4	18	55	80	−25	28	
15	UD España Tánger	34	11	5	18	54	71	−17	27	
16	SD Emeritense	34	9	3	22	54	122	−68	21	Relegation phase
17	Larache CF	34	6	7	21	43	102	−59	19	Relegation phase
18	CD Electromecánicas	34	5	6	23	38	86	−48	16	Relegation phase

== Final phase ==
=== Group I ===
Pos	Team	Pld	W	D	L	GF	GA	GD	Pts	Promotion or qualification
1	UD Melilla	10	7	0	3	16	14	+2	14	Promotion to Segunda División
2	UD Las Palmas	10	7	0	3	20	14	+6	14	Promotion to Segunda División
3	Imperial Murcia	10	6	0	4	23	15	+8	12	Promotion/relegation play-off
4	SD Ceuta	10	6	0	4	30	21	+9	12	Promotion/relegation play-off
5	CD Toledo	10	2	1	7	19	36	−17	5	
6	CD Tenerife	10	1	1	8	10	26	−16	3	

=== Group II ===
Pos	Team	Pld	W	D	L	GF	GA	GD	Pts	Promotion or qualification
1	CD Logroñés	10	6	1	3	24	15	+9	13	Promotion to Segunda División
2	UD Huesca	10	5	2	3	25	18	+7	12	Promotion to Segunda División
3	CD San Andrés	10	4	2	4	30	17	+13	10	Promotion/relegation play-off
4	Caudal Deportivo	10	3	3	4	19	20	−1	9	Promotion/relegation play-off
5	CD Tortosa	10	4	1	5	25	35	−10	9	
6	Real Avilés	10	3	3	4	15	27	−12	9	

=== Promotion/relegation play-off ===
Team 1	Score	Team 2
Erandio	1-3	CD San Andrés
CF Badalona	6-1	CD Tortosa
Elche CF	0-2	SD Ceuta
Cartagena CF	2-2	Imperial CF

- Replay:

Team 1	Score	Team 2
Cartagena CF	3-0	Imperial CF

- Continuing in Segunda: C.F. Badalona & Cartagena C.F.
- Promotion to Segunda: C.D. San Andrés & S.D. Ceuta
- Relegation to Tercera: Club Erandio & Elche C.F.

== Relegation Phase ==
=== Promoción Permanencia en Tercera - Grupo I ===
Pos	Team	Pld	W	D	L	GF	GA	GD	Pts	Promotion or relegation
1	S.D. Vetusta	8	6	0	2	23	5	+18	12	Promotion to Tercera
2	S.D. Ponferradina	8	5	0	3	20	11	+9	10	Continuing in Tercera
3	Rayo Cantabria	8	5	0	3	27	16	+11	10	Relegation to Regional
4	Club Berbés	8	4	0	4	23	26	−3	8	Relegation to Regional
5	C.D. Miguel del Prado	8	0	0	8	11	46	−35	0	

- Vimenor retired in this group.

=== Promoción Permanencia en Tercera - Grupo II ===
Pos	Team	Pld	W	D	L	GF	GA	GD	Pts	Promotion
1	S.D. Éibar	10	7	0	3	28	7	+21	14	Promotion to Tercera
2	C.D. Basconia	10	7	0	3	26	12	+14	14	Promotion to Tercera
3	C.D. Binéfar	10	6	1	3	35	17	+18	13	
4	Real Unión Club	10	4	2	4	19	21	−2	10	Relegation to Regional
5	C.D. Calahorra	10	4	1	5	16	21	−5	9	Relegation to Regional
6	C.D. Anaitasuna	10	0	0	10	7	53	−46	0	

=== Promoción Permanencia en Tercera - Grupo III ===
Pos	Team	Pld	W	D	L	GF	GA	GD	Pts	Promotion
1	C.D. Manresa	10	8	0	2	38	17	+21	16	Promotion to Tercera
2	S.D. La España Ind.	10	7	1	2	37	12	+25	15	Promotion to Tercera
3	U.D. Poblense	10	4	1	5	20	27	−7	9	
4	C.F. Igualada	10	4	1	5	16	29	−13	9	Relegation to Regional
5	C.D. Acero	10	3	1	6	16	25	−9	7	Relegation to Regional
6	Vinaroz C.F.	10	2	0	8	18	35	−17	2 (Note: Vinaroz - Manresa (4-3), Vinaroz lost the game and 1 penalty point)	

=== Promoción Permanencia en Tercera - Grupo IV ===
Pos	Team	Pld	W	D	L	GF	GA	GD	Pts	Promotion
1	U.B. Conquense	8	4	1	3	24	20	+4	9	Continuing in Tercera
2	Villena C.F.	8	4	1	3	22	18	+4	9	Continuing in Tercera
3	C.D. Electrodo	8	3	3	2	15	20	−5	9	
4	C.D. Cuatro Caminos	8	2	2	4	15	23	−8	6	
5	Novelda C.F.	8	3	1	4	24	19	+5	5 (Note: Cuatro Caminos - Novelda (1-1) and Novelda - Electrodo (4-1), Novelda lost the games and 2 penalty points.)	

Notes:
- Gim. Abad, gave up taking part in competition.

=== Promoción Permanencia en Tercera - Grupo V ===
Pos	Team	Pld	W	D	L	GF	GA	GD	Pts	Promotion
1	Larache CF	10	5	2	3	19	15	+4	12	Continuing in Tercera
2	Español C.F. Tetuán	10	4	4	2	20	22	−2	12	Promotion to Tercera
3	C.D. Utrera	10	4	3	3	21	21	0	11	
4	S.D. Emeritense	10	5	0	5	28	22	+6	10	Relegation to Regional
5	C. At. Malagueño	10	3	3	4	17	14	+3	9	
6	C.D. Hércules Gaditano	10	1	4	5	14	25	−11	6	

=== Fase de Permanencia en Tercera ===
Pos	Team	Pld	W	D	L	GF	GA	GD	Pts	Promotion
1	Burgos C.F.	2	2	0	0	6	0	+6	4	Promotion to Tercera
2	C.D. Valdepeñas	2	0	0	2	0	6	−6	0	Relegation to Regional

- Berbés participating in Permanency phase.
- Sueca and Electromecánicas, gave up taking part in competition.
