= 1948–49 Copa del Generalísimo =

47th Copa del Rey

Tournament details
- Country: Spain
- Teams: 117

Final positions
- Champions: Valencia (2nd title)
- Runners-up: Atlético de Bilbao

Tournament statistics
- Matches played: 126

The 1948–49 Copa del Generalísimo was the 47th staging of the Copa del Rey, the Spanish football cup competition.

The competition began on 4 September 1948 and concluded on 29 May 1949 with the final.

== Third round ==
Team 1	Score	Team 2
Pontevedra CF	1–2	Sociedad Gimnástica Lucense
Real Avilés CF	8–0	Maestranza Aérea de León
Arenas Club	3–2	SD Indauchu
CA Osasuna	3–1	Maestranza Aérea de Logroño
RCD Mallorca	3–2	UD San Martín
Arenas SD Zaragoza	2–1	Tarrasa CF
Gimnástica Segoviana	2–4	UD Salamanca
Tomelloso CF	1–0	CD Badajoz
CD Segarra	1–0	Alicante CF
UD Almería	1–2	Albacete Balompié
RCD Córdoba	3–2	Cádiz CF
SD Ceuta	3–2	UD Melilla

== Fourth round ==
Team 1	Score	Team 2
Deportivo La Coruña	3–0	Club Ferrol
Sociedad Gimnástica Lucense	1–2	RC Celta
Real Avilés CF	1–2	Real Gijón
Baracaldo CF	3–0	Real Santander
Club Atlético de Bilbao	8–2	Arenas Club
Real Sociedad	1–0	CA Osasuna
CD Sabadell CF	2–4	Gerona CF
CF Badalona	0–2	RCD Mallorca
Arenas SD Zaragoza	2–1	CD Castellón
Hércules CF	3–2	CD Segarra
UD Salamanca	6–1	Levante UD
CD Mestalla	1–2	CD Alcoyano
Real Murcia	2–3	Albacete Balompié
Tomelloso CF	0–1	Granada CF
RCD Córdoba	0–3	Sevilla CF
CD Málaga	6–1	SD Ceuta

Source: RSSSF

== Fifth round ==
Team 1	Score	Team 2
Real Gijón	2–3	Deportivo La Coruña
RC Celta	6–3	UD Salamanca
Baracaldo CF	0–3	Real Sociedad
Club Atlético de Bilbao	7–0	Arenas SD Zaragoza
Gerona CF	4–2	RCD Mallorca
Albacete Balompié	1–0	CD Alcoyano
Granada CF	2–1	Hércules CF
Sevilla CF	5–2	CD Málaga

Source: RSSSF

== Round of 16 ==
Team 1	Agg.	Team 2	1st leg	2nd leg
RCD Español	3–2	RC Celta	3–1	0–1
Gimnástico de Tarragona	5–4	Albacete Balompié	5–1	0–3
Real Madrid CF	3–3	Club Atlético de Bilbao	2–2	1–1
Deportivo La Coruña	0–1	Valencia CF	0–1	(Note: Only one match.)
Real Sociedad	4–0	Real Oviedo	4–0	
CF Barcelona	9–0	Gerona CF	9–0	
Granada CF	4–1	Real Valladolid	4–1	
Club Atlético de Madrid	2–1	Sevilla CF	2–1	

Source: RSSSF

- Tiebreaker

Team 1	Score	Team 2
Real Madrid CF	1–3	Club Atlético de Bilbao

== Quarter-finals ==
Team 1	Agg.	Team 2	1st leg	2nd leg
RCD Español	7–6	Club Atlético de Madrid	6–1	1–5
Club Atlético de Bilbao	3–2	Club Gimnástico de Tarragona	3–0	0–2
Granada CF	2–7	CF Barcelona	2–2	0–5
Valencia CF	5–3	Real Sociedad de Fútbol	3–2	2–1

Source: RSSSF

== Semi-finals ==
Team 1	Agg.	Team 2	1st leg	2nd leg
RCD Español	3–8	Club Atlético de Bilbao	1–2	2–6
Valencia CF	5–4	CF Barcelona	3–1	2–3

Source: RSSSF

== Final ==
Team 1	Score	Team 2
Valencia CF	1–0	Atlético de Bilbao

Copa del Generalísimo
winners
Valencia CF
2nd title
