= José Fontanet =

Spanish water polo player (1900–1941)

Personal information
- Nationality: Spanish
- Born: 22 July 1900; Barcelona, Spain
- Died: 31 December 1941 (aged 41); Barcelona, Spain

Sport
- Sport: Water polo

José Fontanet (22 July 1900 – 31 December 1941) was a Spanish water polo player. He competed at the 1920 Summer Olympics and the 1924 Summer Olympics.
