= José Valle =

Argentine footballer and coach

Personal information
- Date of birth: June 19, 1920
- Place of birth: Buenos Aires, Argentina
- Position: Midfielder

Senior career*
Years	Team	Apps	(Gls)
1941–1943	Atlanta	32	(4)
1944	Independiente	1	(0)
1945–1947	Temperley		
1947–1950	Roma	69	(3)
1950–1951	Lleida	18	(1)
1951-1953	Lusitano de Évora	52	(5)
1953–1956	Porto	39	(0)

Managerial career
- 1960–1961: Leixões
- 1961–1962: Atlético CP
- 1962–1964: Vitória de Guimarães
- 1965–1966: Braga
- 1966–1967: Varzim
- 1967: Braga
- * Club domestic league appearances and goals

José Valle Román (June 19, 1920 in Buenos Aires – September 16, 1997 in Buenos Aires) was an Argentine professional football player and coach.

He played for 3 seasons (69 games, 3 goals) in the Serie A for A.S. Roma. Jose Valle was one of the best players in that era. After a brief spell with Catalan clube LLeida he signed for Portuguese clube Lusitano de Évora. In Évora he was a part of the mythical team that gained the first promotion to the Portuguese First Division. He also helped the lusitanists gain a 7th place in their first season ever. The next season Valle would move to Porto where he remained for three seasons. In his last season at FC Porto he would still play one match in the retirement season to become Portuguese champion with the dragons.

Valle decided to remain in Portugal where he coached Leixões, Atlético CP, Vitória de Guimarães, Varzim and Braga. With Vitória de Guimarães he would lead the team to the Portuguese Cup final in the 1962/63 season. But he would lose to Sporting 4–0.
