= Xerez FC =

Xerez Club
- Full name: Xerez Football Club
- Nickname: Azulinos
- Founded: 1907; 119 years ago
- Dissolved: 28 August 1946; 79 years ago
- Ground: Estadio Domecq; Jerez, Andalusia, Spain
- Capacity: 13,000
- Chairman: José Manuel Domecq
Home colours

Xerez Club was a Spanish football team from Jerez de la Frontera, Andalusia, Spain. Founded in 1907 by Sir Thomas Spencer Reiman, a worker from William's & Humbert.

== History ==
Shield as Jerez CF

Founded in 1907, in 1933 it was refounded as Xerez Foot-ball Club after the war it was renamed Xerez Club. In 1947 Xerez Club and CD Jerez merged in Xerez CD.

=== Background ===
Xerez Club - (1907–1946) → ↓

Xerez Club Deportivo - (1947–present)

Club Deportivo Jerez - (1942–1946) → ↑

== Seasons ==
- Xerez FC:

Season	Tier	Division	Place	Copa del Rey
1932–33	4	Regional		
1933–34	3	3ª	2nd	
1934–35	4	1ª Reg.	1st	
1935–36	2	2ª	2nd	
1939–40	2	2ª	5th	
1940–41	2	2ª	6th	

- Xerez Club:

Season	Tier	Division	Place	Copa del Rey
1941–42	2	2ª	7th	
1942–43	2	2ª	2nd	
1943–44	2	2ª	5th	
1944–45	2	2ª	5th	
1945–46	2	2ª	12th	First round

- 8 seasons in Segunda División
- 1 season in Tercera División

== Honours ==
- Campeonato Regional Sur
  - Runners-up (1): 1935–36
