= Estadio de Vallejo =

Multi-use stadium in Valencia, Spain

- Interactive map of Estadio de Vallejo
- Full name: Estadio de Vallejo
- Location: Valencia, Spain
- Capacity: 18,000

Construction
- Opened: November 29, 1925
- Closed: 1968

Tenant
- Levante UD

Estadio de Vallejo was a multi-use stadium in Valencia, Spain. It was initially used as the stadium of Levante UD matches. It was replaced by the current Estadi Ciutat de València in 1969. The capacity of the stadium was 18,000 spectators.
