= Estadio José Zorrilla (1940) =

Multi-use stadium in Valladolid, Spain

- Interactive map of Estadio José Zorrilla
- Full name: Estadio José Zorrilla
- Location: Valladolid, Spain
- Coordinates: 41.64°N 4.74°W
- Owner: Real Valladolid
- Operator: Real Valladolid
- Capacity: 10,000

Construction
- Opened: 1940
- Closed: 1984
- Demolished: 1987

Tenant
- Real Valladolid

Estadio José Zorrilla was a multi-use stadium in Valladolid, Spain. It was initially used as the stadium for Real Valladolid matches. The first match took place on 3 November 1940 with a 4–1 win over Arenas Club de Getxo. The capacity of the stadium was 18,000 spectators, although this was extended for the last game of the 1980–81 season to 22,000 with the use of temporary seating for a match against Real Madrid. It was replaced by the current Estadio José Zorrilla in 1982, although the reserve team, Real Valladolid B, carried on using the ground until 1984.

The stadium was finally demolished in 1987. The site is now occupied by a branch of the El Corte Inglés department store.
