= RCD Córdoba =

Spanish association football club

Real Córdoba
- logo
- Full name: Real Club Deportivo Córdoba
- Nickname(s): The Romans
- Founded: 28 August 1934; 90 years ago
- Dissolved: 30 July 1954; 70 years ago
- Ground: Estadio El Arcángel, Córdoba, Andalusia, Spain
- Capacity: 15,425
Home colours

Real Club Deportivo Córdoba is a defunct Spanish football team from Córdoba, Andalusia. Real Córdoba was founded in 1934 and dissolved in 1954.

== History ==
Real Córdoba was founded in 1934 as Racing Fútbol Club. The club changed its name in 1941 to Club Deportivo Córdoba adding real-suffix in 1944.

In 1954, RCD Córdoba was dissolved due to the many debts. At same time, Córdoba CF was founded for substitute RCD Córdoba.

=== Club names ===
- Racing Fútbol Club – (1934–1941)
- Club Deportivo Córdoba – (1941–1944)
- Real Club Deportivo Córdoba – (1944–1954)

== Season to season ==
Season	Tier	Division	Place	Copa del Rey
1934–35	4	1ª Reg.	4th	
1935–36	4	1ª Reg. B	1st	
1939–40	2	2ª	4th	
1940–41	2	2ª	11th	
1941–42	3	1ª Reg.	6th	
1942–43	3	1ª Reg.	2nd	
1943–44	3	3ª	5th	
1944–45	3	3ª	1st	
1945–46	2	2ª	5th	

Season	Tier	Division	Place	Copa del Rey
1946–47	2	2ª	8th	
1947–48	2	2ª	14th	
1948–49	3	3ª	2nd	
1949–50	2	2ª	8th	
1950–51	2	2ª	5th	
1951–52	2	2ª	9th	
1952–53	2	2ª	13th	
1953–54	3	3ª	13th	

- 9 seasons in Segunda División
- 4 seasons in Tercera División
