= Estadio Alfonso Murube =

Football stadium in Ceuta, Spain

Coordinates: 35.8854°N 5.3279°W

Alfonso Murube
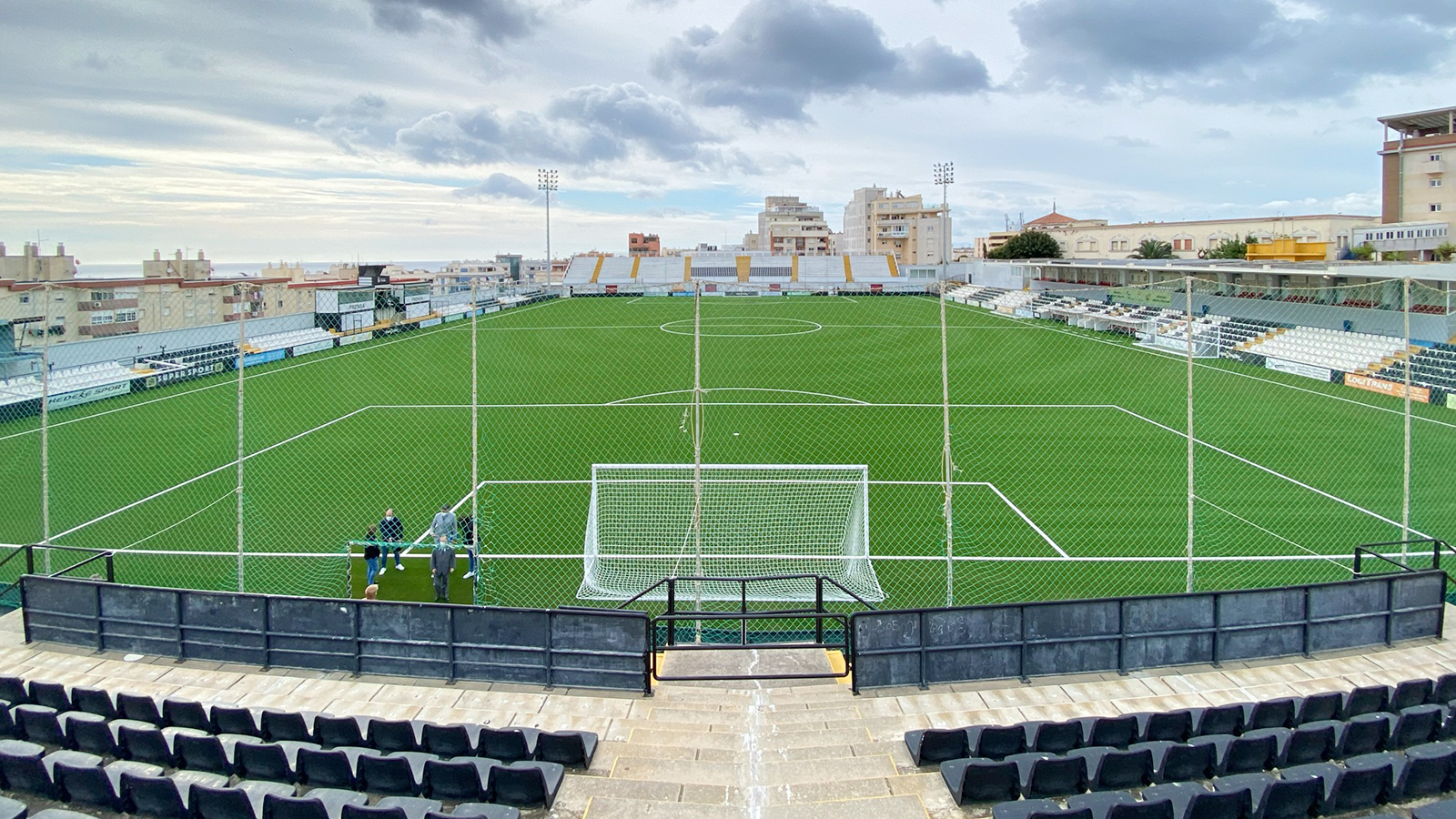
- Interactive map of Alfonso Murube
- Full name: Estadio Municipal Alfonso Murube
- Location: Avenida de Otero s/n 51002 Ceuta, Spain
- Owner: Autonomous city of Ceuta
- Capacity: 5,500
- Surface: Grass
- Field size: 105 m × 70 m (344 ft × 230 ft)

Construction
- Opened: 8 October 1997

Tenant
- AD Ceuta FC

Estadio Alfonso Murube is a football stadium in the autonomous city of Ceuta, Spain in Northern Africa. It is the home stadium of AD Ceuta FC, who currently play in the Segunda División with a capacity of 6,500 seats. The stadium was inaugurated with a match between Ceuta and Algeciras Club de Fútbol, with the home team winning 4–2.

== Other events ==
On 16 April 2002, the stadium hosted a friendly between the Spain national under-21 football team coached by Iñaki Sáez and the Yugoslavia under-21 team. With star players José Antonio Reyes, Fernando Torres, Pepe Reina, Asier Del Horno, Javier Portillo, Mikel Arteta, Xabi Alonso, and Raúl Bravo making appearances, Spain defeated Yugoslavia 2–1 with goals from Reyes and Torres.
