= 1929 Segunda División Grupo B =

Segunda División Grupo B
- Season: 1929
- Champions: Cultural Leonesa
- Promoted: Cultural Leonesa; Real Murcia

The 1929 Segunda División Grupo B season saw 10 teams participate in the first edition of the national third-level Spanish football league (although officially it was a section of the second level). Cultural Leonesa and Real Murcia were promoted to the 1929–30 Segunda División. There were no teams relegated. This division was renamed as the Tercera División for the following season.

== Stadia and locations ==
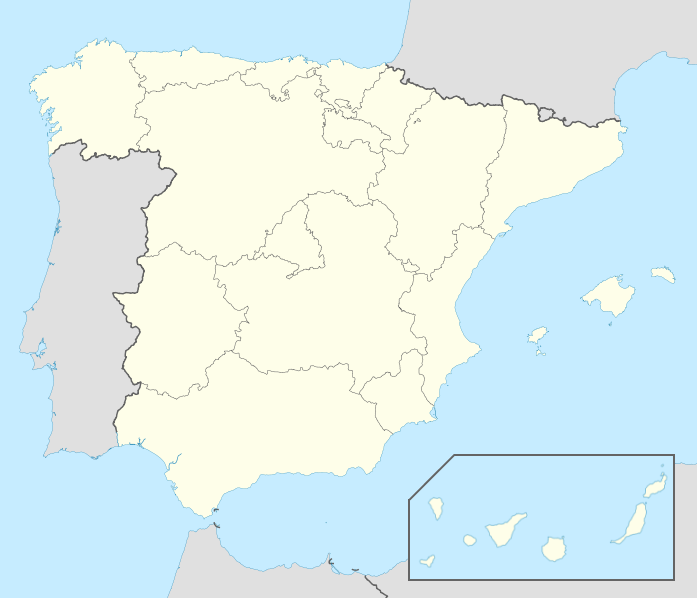

| Club | City | Stadium | Capacity |
|---|---|---|---|
| Cultural y Deportiva Leonesa | León | Campo de Guzmán | - |
| Real Murcia Football Club | Murcia | La Condomina | - |
| Club Deportivo Castellón | Castellón de la Plana | Campo del Sequiol | 6.000 |
| Gimnástica de Torrelavega | Torrelavega | El Malecón | - |
| Real Zaragoza Club Deportivo | Zaragoza | Campo de la calle del Asalto | - |
| Real Valladolid Deportivo | Valladolid | Estadio de la Sociedad Taurina | 4.000 |
| Club Atlético Osasuna | Pamplona | Campo de San Juan | 20.000 |
| Tolosa Football Club | Tolosa | Berazubi | - |
| Baracaldo Football Club | Baracaldo | Lasesarre | - |
| Cartagena Football Club | Cartagena | Stadium Cartagenero | - |

== League table ==
| Pos | Team | Pld | W | D | L | GF | GA | GD | Pts |
|---|---|---|---|---|---|---|---|---|---|
| 1 | Cultural Leonesa | 18 | 13 | 0 | 5 | 55 | 31 | +24 | 26 |
| 2 | Murcia | 18 | 11 | 2 | 5 | 56 | 37 | +19 | 24 |
| 3 | Castellón | 18 | 11 | 1 | 6 | 54 | 34 | +20 | 23 |
| 4 | Gimnástica Torrelavega | 18 | 8 | 4 | 6 | 35 | 38 | −3 | 20 |
| 5 | Zaragoza | 18 | 9 | 2 | 7 | 45 | 41 | +4 | 20 |
| 6 | Valladolid | 18 | 9 | 1 | 8 | 44 | 46 | −2 | 19 |
| 7 | Osasuna | 18 | 6 | 3 | 9 | 35 | 41 | −6 | 15 |
| 8 | Tolosa | 18 | 5 | 2 | 11 | 26 | 46 | −20 | 12 |
| 9 | Barakaldo | 18 | 4 | 3 | 11 | 34 | 50 | −16 | 11 |
| 10 | Cartagena | 18 | 3 | 4 | 11 | 24 | 44 | −20 | 10 |

=== Promotion playoff ===
| Finals |
| Sans | 2 |
| Levante | 1 |

| Finals |
| Gimnástico | 2 |
| Extremadura | 0 |

| Finals |
| Tolosa | 3 |
| Patria Aragón | 1 |

| Finals |
| Langreano | 2 |
| Barakaldo | 0 |
