= 1925 Copa del Rey =

1925 King Alfonso XIII's Cup
25th Copa del Rey

Tournament details
- Country: Spain

Final positions
- Champions: Barcelona (6th title)
- Runners-up: Arenas

Tournament statistics
- Matches played: 27
- Goals scored: 109 (4.04 per match)

The King Alfonso XIII's Cup 1925 was the 25th staging of the Copa del Rey, the Spanish football cup competition.

== Teams ==
A record twelve teams were invited to play the tournament, as the champion of Castile and León was also invited, while the Levante Championship was split into two tournaments: the Valencian Championship and the Murcian Championship.

The following eleven teams competed (the entry of Real Murcia, winners of the newly formed Championship of Murcia, was rejected):

- Biscay: Arenas Club
- Gipuzkoa: Real Sociedad
- Centre Region: Athletic Madrid
- South Region: Sevilla FC
- Galicia: Celta de Vigo
- Asturias: Stadium Ovetense
- Cantabria: Racing de Santander
- Catalonia: FC Barcelona
- Aragón: Stadium de Zaragoza
- Levante: Valencia CF
- Castile and León: CD Español

== Group stage ==
The winner of each group advanced to the semifinals.

=== Group I ===
Team	Pld	W	D	L	GF	GA	GD	Pts
FC Barcelona	4	3	1	0	21	5	+16	7
Valencia CF	4	2	1	1	13	8	+5	5
Stadium de Zaragoza	4	0	0	4	1	22	-21	0

March 1, 1925

FC Barcelona	7–3	Valencia CF

Les Corts, Barcelona

March 8, 1925

Valencia CF	8–0	Stadium de Zaragoza

Mestalla, Valencia

March 15, 1925

Stadium de Zaragoza	1–5	FC Barcelona

Campo del Arrabal, Zaragoza

March 22, 1925

Valencia CF	1–1	FC Barcelona

Mestalla, Valencia

March 29, 1925

Stadium de Zaragoza	0–1	Valencia CF

Campo del Arrabal, Zaragoza

April 5, 1925

FC Barcelona	8–0	Stadium de Zaragoza

Les Corts, Barcelona

=== Group II ===
Team	Pld	W	D	L	GF	GA	GD	Pts
Athletic Madrid	2	1	0	1	3	2	+1	2
Sevilla FC	2	1	0	1	2	3	-1	2

March 15, 1925

Athletic Madrid	3–1	Sevilla FC

Metropolitano, Madrid

April 5, 1925

Sevilla FC	1–0	Athletic Madrid

Reina Victoria, Seville

==== Tie-break match ====
April 12, 1925

Athletic Madrid	3–2	Sevilla FC

Mestalla, Valencia

=== Group III ===
Team	Pld	W	D	L	GF	GA	GD	Pts
Arenas Club de Getxo	4	1	3	0	7	5	+2	5
Real Sociedad	4	1	2	1	7	5	+2	4
Racing de Santander	4	0	3	1	4	8	-4	3

March 8, 1925

Racing de Santander	1–1	Real Sociedad

El Sardinero, Santander

March 15, 1925

Real Sociedad	1–1	Arenas Club de Getxo

Atotxa, San Sebastián

March 19, 1925

Arenas Club de Getxo	2–2	Racing de Santander

Josaleta, Getxo

March 22, 1925

Real Sociedad	4–0	Racing de Santander

Atotxa, San Sebastián

March 29, 1925

Arenas Club de Getxo	3–1	Real Sociedad

Josaleta, Getxo

April 5, 1925

Racing de Santander	1–1	Arenas Club de Getxo

El Sardinero, Santander

=== Group IV ===
Team	Pld	W	D	L	GF	GA	GD	Pts
Celta de Vigo	4	4	0	0	19	6	+13	8
RSC Ovetense	4	1	1	2	6	8	-2	3
CD Español	4	0	1	3	5	16	-11	1

March 1, 1925

CD Español	1–6	Celta de Vigo

La Victoria, Valladolid

March 8, 1925

RSC Ovetense	1–0	CD Español

Vetusta, Oviedo

March 15, 1925

Celta de Vigo	2–0	RSC Ovetense

Coia, Vigo

March 22, 1925

Celta de Vigo	7–2	CD Español

Coia, Vigo

March 29, 1925

CD Español	2–2	RSC Ovetense

La Victoria, Valladolid

April 12, 1925

RSC Ovetense	3–4	Celta de Vigo

Vetusta, Oviedo

== Semifinals ==
First leg:

April 19, 1925
FC Barcelona	3–2	Athletic Madrid
Arenas Club de Getxo	1–0	Celta Vigo
Second leg:
April 26, 1925
Athletic Madrid	2–1	FC Barcelona
Celta Vigo	1–1	Arenas Club de Getxo	agg:1–2
Tie break:
May 3, 1925
FC Barcelona	2–1	Athletic Madrid	agg:6–5

== Final ==
10 May 1925
16:45 CET

Barcelona	2–0	Arenas
Samitier 9'; Sancho 34'

Reina Victoria, Seville
Attendance: 6,000
Referee: Tomás Balaguer

1925 Copa del Rey winners
Barcelona
6th title
