= 1928 Copa del Rey =

1928 King Alfonso XIII's Cup
28th Copa del Rey

Tournament details
- Country: Spain
- Teams: 26

Final positions
- Champions: FC Barcelona (8th title)
- Runners-up: Real Sociedad

Tournament statistics
- Matches played: 139
- Goals scored: 644 (4.63 per match)

The King Alfonso XIII's Cup 1928 was the 28th staging of the Copa del Rey, the Spanish football cup competition.

The competition started on 31 January 1928, and concluded on 29 June 1928, with the second final tiebreaker, held at the Estadio El Sardinero in Santander. FC Barcelona won the competition for the eighth time.

== Calendar ==
Phase	Round	First leg	Second leg
Qualifying	Qualifying round	31 January 1928	2 February 1928
Group stage	Matchday 1	5 February 1928	
Group stage	Matchday 2	12 February 1928	
Group stage	Matchday 3	19 February 1928	
Group stage	Matchday 4	26 February 1928	
Group stage	Matchday 5	4 March 1928	
Group stage	Matchday 6	11 March 1928	
Group stage	Matchday 7	18 March 1928	
Group stage	Matchday 8	25 March 1928	
Group stage	Matchday 9	1 April 1928	
Group stage	Matchday 10	8 April 1928	
Knockout phase	Quarter-finals	15 April 1928	29 April 1928
Knockout phase	Semi-finals	6 May 1928	13 May 1928
Knockout phase	Final	20 May 1928	
Knockout phase	Tiebreaker 1	22 May 1928	
Knockout phase	Tiebreaker 2	29 June 1928	

== Teams ==
As in the previous tournament, 26 teams entered the competition.

- Aragón Region: Iberia SC, Patria Aragón
- Asturias Region: Real Oviedo, Racing de Sama
- Balearic Islands Region: US Mahón
- Cantabria Region: Racing de Santander, Gimnástica de Torrelavega
- Castile and León Region: Cultural y Deportiva Leonesa, Real Unión Deportiva
- Catalonia Region: FC Barcelona, CD Europa
- Extremadura Region: Patria FC
- Galicia Region: Celta de Vigo, Deportivo de La Coruña
- Gipuzkoa Region: Real Unión, Real Sociedad
- Murcia Region: Real Murcia, Cartagena FC
- Centre Region: Real Madrid, Athletic Madrid
- South Region: Sevilla FC, Real Betis
- Levante Region: Valencia CF, Levante FC
- Biscay Region: Athletic Bilbao, CD Alavés

== Qualifying round ==
Team 1	Agg.	Team 2	1st leg	2nd leg
Real Madrid	10–1	Patria FC	7–0	3–1
US Mahón	3–13	CD Europa	1–5	2–8

== Group stage ==
=== Group I ===
Team	Pld	W	D	L	GF	GA	Pts
Celta de Vigo	10	7	1	2	55	17	15
Real Oviedo	10	7	1	2	39	19	15
Deportivo de La Coruña	10	6	1	3	32	14	13
Cultural y Deportiva Leonesa	10	4	1	5	23	33	9
Racing de Sama	10	2	0	8	13	43	4
Real Unión Deportiva	10	2	0	8	15	51	4

	CEL	LEO	DEP	SAM	OVI	UNI
Celta de Vigo		8–0	2–1	7–1	7–2	11–1
Cultural y Deportiva Leonesa	3–2		3–2	2–1	3–3	6–1
Deportivo de La Coruña	3–3	6–1		4–0	2–0	6–0
Racing de Sama	1–5	3–1	0–4		1–5	5–4
Real Oviedo	4–2	5–3	4–0	7–0		6–0
Real Unión Deportiva	1–8	2–1	1–4	4–1	1–3	

=== Group II ===
Team	Pld	W	D	L	GF	GA	Pts
CD Alavés	10	5	4	1	17	9	14
Real Madrid	10	6	2	2	23	17	14
Racing de Santander	10	6	1	3	34	13	13
Athletic Bilbao	10	6	1	3	26	13	13
Gimnástica de Torrelavega	10	1	2	7	8	38	4
Athletic de Madrid	10	1	0	9	12	30	2

	ATH	ATM	ALA	GIM	RAC	RMA
Athletic Bilbao		3–1	0–0	8–0	3–1	3–1
Athletic de Madrid	2–4		1–3	3–2	1–4	0–1
CD Alavés	2–0	2–1		3–0	2–1	0–1
Gimnástica de Torrelavega	1–3	2–1	0–0		0–5	2–2
Racing de Santander	2–0	6–2	2–2	7–0		4–0
Real Madrid	3–2	3–0	3–3	6–1	3–2	

=== Group III ===
Team	Pld	W	D	L	GF	GA	Pts
FC Barcelona	10	7	2	1	35	18	16
Real Sociedad	10	8	0	2	31	17	16
Real Unión	10	7	1	2	36	17	15
CD Europa	10	3	1	6	22	21	7
Iberia SC	10	3	0	7	16	28	6
Patria Aragón	10	0	0	10	7	46	0

	EUR	FCB	IBE	PAT	RSO	RUN
CD Europa		2–3	7–0	4–2	0–1	0–3
FC Barcelona	2–2		4–1	7–0	4–1	4–4
Iberia SC	2–1	0–1		4–1	1–3	3–4
CD Patria Aragón	2–3	1–3	0–3		0–3	0–7
Real Sociedad	4–2	5–4	5–1	4–1		4–1
Real Unión	2–1	2–3	2–1	8–0	3–1	

=== Group IV ===
Team	Pld	W	D	L	GF	GA	Pts
Real Murcia	10	7	1	2	23	14	15
Valencia FC	10	5	2	3	21	20	12
Cartagena FC	10	4	2	4	18	17	10
Sevilla FC	10	3	3	4	16	14	9
Real Betis	10	3	3	4	20	20	9
Levante FC	10	2	1	7	13	26	5

	CAR	LEV	BET	MUR	SEV	VAL
Cartagena FC		4–1	4–2	2–2	1–0	4–0
Levante FC	2–2		0–1	1–3	2–0	1–3
Real Betis	3–0	4–2		1–3	1–1	0–1
Real Murcia	2–1	5–1	3–2		1–2	1–0
Sevilla FC	1–0	0–1	3–3	1–2		7–2
Valencia FC	4–0	4–2	3–3	3–1	1–1	

== Knockout stage ==
=== Quarterfinals ===
Team 1	Agg.	Team 2	1st leg	2nd leg
FC Barcelona	9–5	Real Oviedo	7–3	2–2
Real Murcia	2–5	CD Alavés	1–2	1–3
RC Celta de Vigo	2–4	Real Sociedad	2–1	0–3
Real Madrid	3–4	Valencia FC	2–2	1–2

=== Semifinals ===
Team 1	Agg.	Team 2	1st leg	2nd leg
Real Sociedad	9–3	Valencia FC	7–0	2–3
FC Barcelona	8–0	CD Alavés	3–0	5–0

=== Final ===
20 May 1928
16:30 CET

FC Barcelona	1–1 (a.e.t.)	Real Sociedad
Samitier 53'		Mariscal 83'

El Sardinero, Santander
Attendance: 18,000
Referee: Pedro Vallana

Replay

22 May 1928
11:30 CET

FC Barcelona	1–1 (a.e.t.)	Real Sociedad
Piera 69'		Kiriki 32'

El Sardinero, Santander
Attendance: 15,000
Referee: Pedro Escartín

Second replay

29 June 1928
17:00 CET

FC Barcelona	3–1	Real Sociedad
Samitier 8'; Arocha 21'; Josep Sastre 25'		Zaldúa 16' (pen.)

El Sardinero, Santander
Attendance: 17,000
Referee: Pablo Saracho

Copa del Rey 1928 Winners
FC Barcelona
8th title
