= 1926 Copa del Rey =

1926 King Alfonso XIII's Cup
26th Copa del Rey

Tournament details
- Country: Spain
- Teams: 24

Final positions
- Champions: Barcelona (7th title)
- Runners-up: Athletic Madrid

Tournament statistics
- Matches played: 62
- Goals scored: 300 (4.84 per match)

The King Alfonso XIII's Cup 1926 was the 26th staging of the Copa del Rey, the Spanish football cup competition.

The competition began on 28 February 1926, and concluded on 16 May 1926 with the final, held at the Mestalla in Valencia, in which Barcelona lifted the trophy for the seventh time following a 3–2 victory over Athletic Madrid.

== Teams ==
For the first time ever, runners-up of each regional championship were able to participate in the tournament. So the tournament was expanded to 24 teams.

- Aragón Region: Iberia SC, Zaragoza CD
- Asturias Region: Sporting de Gijón, Fortuna de Gijón
- Cantabria Region: Racing de Santander, Gimnástica de Torrelavega
- Castile and León Region: Cultural y Deportiva Leonesa, Real Unión Deportiva
- Catalonia Region: FC Barcelona, RCD Español
- Galicia Region: Celta de Vigo, Deportivo de La Coruña
- Gipuzkoa Region: Real Unión, Real Sociedad
- Murcia Region: Real Murcia, Cartagena FC
- Centre Region: Real Madrid, Athletic Madrid
- South Region: Sevilla FC, Real Betis
- Levante Region: Valencia CF, Levante FC
- Biscay Region: Athletic Bilbao, Arenas Club

== Group stage ==
=== Group 1 ===
| Team | Pld | W | D | L | GF | GA | Pts |
|---|---|---|---|---|---|---|---|
| RCD Espanyol | 4 | 4 | 0 | 0 | 15 | 3 | 8 |
| Valencia CF | 4 | 1 | 0 | 3 | 12 | 9 | 2 |
| Iberia SC | 4 | 1 | 0 | 3 | 5 | 20 | 2 |

February 28, 1926
| Valencia CF | 1–4 | RCD Espanyol |
March 7, 1926
| Iberia SC | 3–1 | Valencia CF |
March 14, 1926
| RCD Espanyol | 6–1 | Iberia SC |
March 21, 1926
| RCD Espanyol | 2–0 | Valencia CF |
March 28, 1926
| Valencia CF | 10–0 | Iberia SC |
April 4, 1926
| Iberia SC | 1–3 | RCD Espanyol |

=== Group 2 ===
| Team | Pld | W | D | L | GF | GA | Pts |
|---|---|---|---|---|---|---|---|
| FC Barcelona | 4 | 4 | 0 | 0 | 19 | 1 | 8 |
| Zaragoza CD | 4 | 1 | 1 | 2 | 7 | 13 | 3 |
| Levante FC | 4 | 0 | 1 | 3 | 4 | 16 | 1 |

February 28, 1926
| FC Barcelona | 5–0 | Levante FC |
March 7, 1926
| Levante FC | 2–2 | Zaragoza CD |
March 14, 1926
| Zaragoza CD | 0–7 | FC Barcelona |
March 21, 1926
| Levante FC | 1–4 | FC Barcelona |
March 28, 1926
| Zaragoza CD | 5–1 | Levante FC |
April 4, 1926
| FC Barcelona | 3–0 | Zaragoza CD |

=== Group 3 ===
| Team | Pld | W | D | L | GF | GA | Pts |
|---|---|---|---|---|---|---|---|
| Real Madrid | 4 | 3 | 0 | 1 | 11 | 6 | 6 |
| Sevilla FC | 4 | 2 | 1 | 1 | 8 | 5 | 5 |
| Real Murcia | 4 | 0 | 1 | 3 | 5 | 13 | 1 |

February 28, 1926
| Real Murcia | 2–2 | Sevilla FC |
March 7, 1926
| Real Madrid | 6–2 | Real Murcia |
March 14, 1926
| Sevilla FC | 0–1 | Real Madrid |
March 21, 1926
| Sevilla FC | 3–0 | Real Murcia |
March 28, 1926
| Real Murcia | 1–2 | Real Madrid |
April 4, 1926
| Real Madrid | 2–3 | Sevilla FC |

=== Group 4 ===
| Team | Pld | W | D | L | GF | GA | Pts |
|---|---|---|---|---|---|---|---|
| Athletic Madrid | 4 | 3 | 0 | 1 | 11 | 6 | 6 |
| Real Betis | 4 | 3 | 0 | 1 | 10 | 5 | 6 |
| Cartagena FC | 4 | 0 | 0 | 4 | 2 | 12 | 0 |

February 28, 1926
| Real Betis | 3–0 | Cartagena FC |
March 7, 1926
| Cartagena FC | 1–2 | Athletic Madrid |
March 14, 1926
| Athletic Madrid | 3–1 | Real Betis |
March 21, 1926
| Cartagena FC | 0–3 | Real Betis |
March 28, 1926
| Athletic Madrid | 4–1 | Cartagena FC |
April 4, 1926
| Real Betis | 3–2 | Athletic Madrid |

==== Tie-break match ====
April 15, 1926

| Athletic Madrid | 4–2 | Real Betis |

Madrid

=== Group 5 ===
| Team | Pld | W | D | L | GF | GA | Pts |
|---|---|---|---|---|---|---|---|
| Celta Vigo | 4 | 3 | 0 | 1 | 19 | 7 | 6 |
| Sporting Gijón | 4 | 3 | 0 | 1 | 16 | 7 | 6 |
| Cultural Leonesa | 4 | 0 | 0 | 4 | 3 | 24 | 0 |

February 28, 1926
| Celta Vigo | 9–0 | Cultural Leonesa |
March 7, 1926
| Sporting Gijón | 3–1 | Celta Vigo |
March 14, 1926
| Cultural Leonesa | 2–6 | Sporting Gijón |
March 21, 1926
| Cultural Leonesa | 1–5 | Celta Vigo |
March 28, 1926
| Celta Vigo | 4–3 | Sporting Gijón |
April 4, 1926
| Sporting Gijón | 4–0 | Cultural Leonesa |

==== Tie-break match ====
April 10, 1926

| Celta de Vigo | 5–0 | Sporting de Gijón |

Madrid

=== Group 6 ===
| Team | Pld | W | D | L | GF | GA | Pts |
|---|---|---|---|---|---|---|---|
| Deportivo la Coruna | 4 | 3 | 0 | 1 | 19 | 7 | 6 |
| Real Unión Deportiva | 4 | 1 | 1 | 2 | 7 | 11 | 3 |
| Fortuna de Gijón | 4 | 1 | 1 | 2 | 4 | 12 | 3 |

February 28, 1926
| Real Unión Deportiva | 4–2 | Deportivo la Coruna |
March 7, 1926
| Deportivo la Coruna | 9–0 | Fortuna de Gijón |
March 14, 1926
| Fortuna de Gijón | 2–0 | Real Unión Deportiva |
March 21, 1926
| Deportivo la Coruna | 6–2 | Real Unión Deportiva |
March 28, 1926
| Fortuna de Gijón | 1–2 | Deportivo la Coruna |
April 4, 1926
| Real Unión Deportiva | 1–1 | Fortuna de Gijón |

=== Group 7 ===
| Team | Pld | W | D | L | GF | GA | Pts |
|---|---|---|---|---|---|---|---|
| Real Unión | 4 | 3 | 0 | 1 | 12 | 8 | 6 |
| Athletic Bilbao | 4 | 1 | 1 | 2 | 8 | 9 | 3 |
| Racing Santander | 4 | 1 | 1 | 2 | 7 | 10 | 3 |

February 28, 1926
| Real Unión de Irun | 2–1 | Racing Santander |
March 7, 1926
| Athletic Bilbao | 1–3 | Real Unión de Irun |
March 14, 1926
| Racing Santander | 1–1 | Athletic Bilbao |
March 21, 1926
| Racing Santander | 4–3 | Real Unión de Irun |
March 28, 1926
| Real Unión de Irun | 4–2 | Athletic Bilbao |
April 4, 1926
| Athletic Bilbao | 4–1 | Racing Santander |

=== Group 8 ===
| Team | Pld | W | D | L | GF | GA | Pts |
|---|---|---|---|---|---|---|---|
| Real Sociedad | 4 | 4 | 0 | 0 | 18 | 5 | 8 |
| Arenas Club de Getxo | 4 | 2 | 0 | 2 | 11 | 11 | 4 |
| Gimnástica Torrelavega | 4 | 0 | 0 | 4 | 3 | 16 | 0 |

February 28, 1926
| Gimnástica Torrelavega | 0–5 | Real Sociedad |
March 7, 1926
| Real Sociedad | 5–3 | Arenas Club de Getxo |
March 14, 1926
| Arenas Club de Getxo | 4–1 | Gimnástica Torrelavega |
March 21, 1926
| Real Sociedad | 4–1 | Gimnástica Torrelavega |
March 28, 1926
| Arenas Club de Getxo | 1–4 | Real Sociedad |
April 4, 1926
| Gimnástica Torrelavega | 1–3 | Arenas Club de Getxo |

== Quarterfinals ==
First leg:

April 18, 1926
| RCD Espanyol | 6–1 | Athletic Madrid |
| Celta Vigo | 2–1 | Real Sociedad |
| Real Madrid | 1–5 | FC Barcelona |
| Real Unión de Irun | 3–0 | Deportivo la Coruna |
Second leg:
April 26, 1926
| Athletic Madrid | 2–0 | RCD Espanyol |
| Real Sociedad | 2–2 | Celta Vigo | agg:4–5 |
| FC Barcelona | 3–0 | Real Madrid | agg:8–1 |
| Deportivo la Coruna | 3–4 | Real Unión de Irun | agg:3–7 |
Tie break:
May 2, 1926
| Athletic Madrid | 3–2 | RCD Espanyol | agg:6–8 |

== Semifinals ==
May 9, 1926

Played in Bilbao
| Athletic Madrid | 3–2 | Celta Vigo |
Played in Zaragoza
| FC Barcelona | 2–1 | Real Unión de Irun |

== Final ==
16 May 1926
17:30 CET

| FC Barcelona | 3–2 (a.e.t.) | Athletic Madrid |
|---|---|---|
| Samitier 62'; Just 63'; Alcántara 112' | | 16' Palacios; 58' (pen.) Cosme |

Mestalla, Valencia
Attendance: 17,000
Referee: Pablo Saracho

Copa del Rey 1926 winners
FC Barcelona
7th title
