= José Luis Costa =

Spanish footballer and manager

Personal information
- Birth name: José Luis Costa Cenzana
- Date of birth: 6 October 1909
- Place of birth: Zaragoza, Spain
- Date of death: 26 January 1986 (aged 76)
- Place of death: Unknown
- Position: Forward

Senior career*
Years	Team	Apps	(Gls)
1925–1929	Zaragoza CD		
1929–1933	Atlético Madrid	18	(8)
1933–1934	Real Zaragoza		

Managerial career
- 1942–1943: Spain (12)
- 1948–1950: Spain B (1)
- * Club domestic league appearances and goals

José Luis Costa Cenzana (6 October 1909 – 26 January 1986) was a Spanish footballer who played as a forward for Real Zaragoza and Atlético Madrid. He co-managed 12 matches of the Spanish national team between 1959 and 1960.

== Playing career ==
Born on 6 October 1909 in Zaragoza, he was one of the co-founders of Zaragoza CD in 1925, at the age of 16, which was the result of the merger of Athletic Stadium (founded in 1919) and Zaragoza FC (founded in 1921). Together with Adolfo Álvarez-Buylla, Costa helped his side to become the finalist of the Aragón Regional Championship on two occasions in 1926 and 1927, the club participated in the Copa del Rey for the first time thanks to his position as runner-up in Aragon, being eliminated in the group stage on both occasions. The team's greatest achievement was competing in the inaugural season of Spain's Segunda División in 1929.

His consistently good performance eventually drew the attention of First Division side Atlético Madrid, which signed him in 1929, but despite scoring 8 goals in 18 matches in that season, Costa was unable to avoid relegation to the Segunda División. He stayed at Atlético until 1933, when he left for the newly founded Real Zaragoza, which was the result of the merger of Zaragoza CD and Iberia SC, where he retired in 1934, at the age of 25.

== Managerial career ==
In January 1953, following the dismissal of Helenio Herrera as the coach of Atlético, Costa was appointed technical secretary to manage the team, while Ramón Colón became the new coach.

Between 1959 and 1960, Costa was a member of the selection committee member of the Spanish national team, a triumvirate made up of himself, Ramón Gabilondo and José Lasplazas, who together oversaw a total of 12 matches, 8 wins and 4 losses. This included 10 friendly matches and two 1960 European Nations' Cup qualifying matches. He also briefly coached Spain B in 1961.

== Death ==
Costa died on 26 January 1986, at the age of 76.
