= 1927–28 Spanish Football League =

Spanish football league season

The 1927–28 Spanish Football League was the first attempt to organize a league championship in Spain in the 1927–28 Spanish season. However, numerous discrepancies arose in its organization and within the teams that participated, which is why it was divided into two competitions, with neither of which being concluded, called Torneo de Campeones and Liga Profesional de Clubs de Football or Liga Máxima. At the time the competition stopped, its first classified teams were FC Barcelona and Racing de Santander, respectively.

The Torneo de Campeones was made up of the so-called "maximalist", the most influential clubs that had been winners of the Spanish Regional Championships and the Copa del Rey; while the Liga Máxima, the "minimalist", made up of the rest of the clubs that advocated free competition at the professionalized national level. However, as they evolved, these meanings reversed among themselves, with the reports and chronicles referring to the "maximalists" as those who made up the Liga Máxima, with the largest number of participants, and the "minimalists" as those of the Torneo de Campeones.

It was designed to be played as a league tournament contested by 16 clubs between September 1927 and July 1928. Initially, equality was advocated for all the clubs, but the Copa del Rey champions did not agree to it, so the clubs were divided into two competitions, eight in the Liga Profesional and the six champions of the Copa del Rey, who established the Union of Football Clubs, decided not to participate and formed the Torneo de Campeones, in addition to two included at the last minute, RCD Espanyol by invitation and CA Osasuna that entered after the creation of the Navarra Football Federation. This division thus postponed the common and consensual birth of a national championship. Although neither of those two competitions was concluded, they were the precursor and the forerunner to La Liga, which began the following season.

== Origins ==
=== Division into two championships ===
Until 1927, the only official competitions that the Spanish football clubs played were their corresponding regional championships and the Copa del Rey, in addition to other local tournaments or friendly matches. With professionalization of football in Spain already regulated since 1926, the clubs had found themselves in the need to obtain greater box office income to meet the increasingly high demands of their main figures and survive financially. The regional championships were hardly profitable for the leading teams, since their stadiums were only filled in the matches of maximum rivalry, so in order to be able to cover the increasingly expensive signings and expenses of each society, the clubs began to discuss the possibility of creating a national professional league that would be more competitive and profitable than the existing championships. In short, the aim was to attract a greater audience and therefore leave greater benefits for the clubs.

The first major change in this regard began to take shape in 1926 when, after a long process of debate, the clubs approved the Regulations of Spanish Professional Football. Following the British model, the first step towards professionalism was taken, laying the foundations for the birth of a championship that would attest to this.

When the creation of this league tournament was finally decided, the discussion focused on the number of participants, which caused a division in two: that of the clubs that wanted a league formed exclusively by the teams that had once won the Copa del Rey, and that of those that wanted the league to be opened to more teams. In the end, after many discussions, and in the absence of agreement, two parallel tournaments were held, that of the "maximalists", with the distinguished teams who had won the Copa del Rey (Athletic Bilbao, Madrid FC, FC Barcelona, Real Unión, and Arenas Club), or their heirs, since the five champions included Real Sociedad thanks to the title of the Club Ciclista, and that of the "minimalists", with the teams that had not achieved any cup feat, which was initially formed by five teams (Racing de Santander, Celta de Vigo, Sporting de Gijón, Valencia FC, and Sevilla FC), plus those excluded by the champions, RCD Español and Atlético Madrid. The six Copa del Rey winners then formed the Champions Union and began advocating the celebration of a League among its members, closed off to the rest. In response, the Professional Football Club League was created to form a larger league tournament, hosting a greater number of participants. Both groups became known as "Minimalists" and "Maximalists" respectively, according to the type of competition they defended.

These discrepancies to integrate what was already called the "tournament of the six", or Torneo de Campeones, caused them to be branded as "anti-ligists" even though they had wanted a tournament with a common league format. The remaining seven clubs began the negotiations for what they called the Liga Profesional or Liga Máxima, allowing the inclusion of each regional champion, and ultimately, the CA Osasuna, the sole representative of the Navarrese federation. Thus, they promoted a meeting at the federative level held on 20 September 1927 with the following representatives: the Federation of Galicia representing the Celta de Vigo and Deportivo de La Coruña; the Federation of Asturias for Sporting de Gijón and Unión Deportivo Racing, both from Gijón; the Cantabria Federation for Racing de Santander and Montaña Sport; the Valencia Federation for the Valencia FC, Atlético Saguntino, and CD Castellón; the Murcia Federation for the Real Murcia, the Cartagena FC, and the River Thader of Murcia; the Centro Federation for Atlético Madrid and the Unión Sporting Club of Madrid; the Federation of Castile and León for the Club Deportivo Español of Valladolid; the Aragon Federation for the Iberia SC of Zaragoza; and the Federation of Andalusia for the Sevilla FC, the Real Betis, the Málaga FC, and the FC Malagueño.

The members of the Liga Máxima began to be called "maximalists", due to their greater number of teams, unlike until then, thus reversing the original meanings of those terms. The formation of the first group of the "maximalist" was quickly followed by the group of the Liga Profesional, but not without attempting the final union of the maximum number of clubs, when the ten clubs that would form a common professional league invited the six champion clubs of Spain to join, but they failed to reach a successful outcome since their tournament had already begun, so the Liga Profesional was also definitively formed.

With both championships in progress, the "maximalists" agreed on 11 April 1928 to enter CA Osasuna into the league, thus modifying the calendar, in addition to re-recruiting RCD Español, which did not compete at the beginning, in addition to accepting other clubs also after the fact that finally did not play, possibly because the Torneo de Campeones was flowing better and it was already planning the inclusion of all those remaining clubs in a new edition, dividing them by divisions.

In view of the better development of the Torneo de Campeones, their "rivals" planned a next cup tournament among all the professional clubs, and up to a total of sixteen, which would be added to those that already made up the Liga Máxima, and even offered the same possibility of making a partition into two divisions, even seeking protection from the Royal Spanish Football Federation, without seeming to come to fruition due to the instability it suffered and which only predicted the breakup of Spanish football. Subsequently, these divisions continued to be talked about by forming the two divisions of the already established 1928-29 championship, under the name of First and Second Division.

== Professional League ==
=== Planning ===
A League is a sports competition in which all the teams or participants of the same category compete against each other, with the winner being the one with the greatest number of points. We must change the perspective of the current league concept, since in this case, the first time in Spain, confrontations between equals were taken into account, without a global sense of completing all the games. The minimalist league tournament was a closed league without relegation. Initially, 3 points were awarded to the winner and one to the loser. Subsequently, a more usual score is collected, granting two points for a victory, one for a draw, and none for a defeat. The champion team would be the one that at the end of the season had obtained the most points. Some games were played in locations that were neither the "home" team nor the "visitor" team. For the Spanish Federation, the league was official since its constitution was provided for in its statutes, although this was not the case for its matches. We are facing a professional competition, at the state level and with tacit recognition by the federation. The teams that had been champions of Spain were invited, but freely decided not to participate in Spain's first professional league. The matches that were planned were:

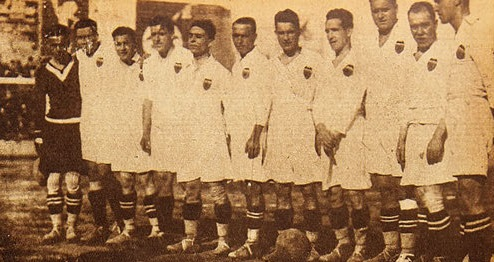
Valencia FC in 1927, one of the clubs of the so-called Maximum Professional League.

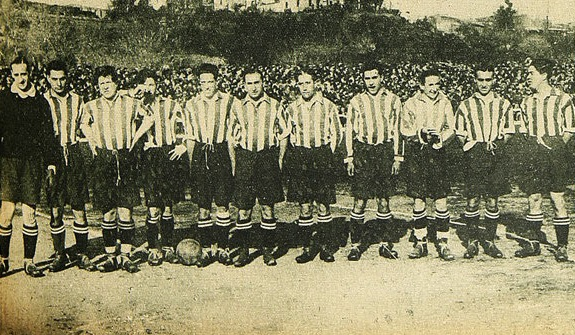
Atlético Madrid in 1927, another of the contenders in the Maximum Professional League.

| | ALA | ATH | CEL | ESP | GIJ | IBE | MUR | OSA | RAC | SEV | VAL |
| Deportivo Alavés | | 3–3 | 2–1 | 1–3 | 2–0 | 2–3 | 5–1 | 5–1 | 3–1 | 7–2 |
| Atlético Madrid | 5–2 | | 15/01, 17/06 | 2–6; 17/05, 07/06 | 3–3 | 3–0 | 4–0 | 2–1 | 2–2 | 4–0, 29/01 | 5–2, 03/06 |
| Celta de Vigo | 1–3 | 3–4 | | 3–2 | 22/01, 5–5 | 27/11, 03/06 | 01/07 | 2–1 | 3–0 | 1–0 | 1–1 |
| RCD Espanyol | 3–1 | 4–2 | 10/06 | | 5–4 | 4–2 | 5–0 | 6–0 | 3–0 | 0–0 |
| Sporting de Gijón | 1–0 | 2–3 | 0–3 | 3–5, 29/01 | | 5–0, 20/11 | 30/10, 29/06 | 8–1 | 7–2 | 4–2, 24/06 | 5–1 |
| Iberia SC | 1–2 | 4–0 | 24/06 | 3–2 | 08/07, 20/05 | | 3–1 | 1–2 | 2–1 | 4–2 | 17/06 |
| Real Murcia | 2–5 | 4–2 | 2–3 | 2–1 | 2–0 | 0–1 | | 2–0 | 3–3 | 03/06 | 3–1, 25/12, 27/05 |
| CA Osasuna | 5–2 | 2–3 | 4–1 | 5–1 | 2–4 | 6–1 | 6–0 | | 1–1 | 2–2 |
| Racing de Santander | 4–4 | 4–1 | 7–4 | 2–0, 22/01 | 3–1, 18/09 | 6–2 | 01/11, 24/06, 01/07 | 4–0 | | 9–0, 25/09, 29/06 |
| Sevilla FC | 3–2 | 5–1 | 2–2 | 4–2, 15/05 | 4–0 | 3–4 | 22/01 | 2–2 | 0–3 | | 2–2 |
| Valencia FC | 3–2 | 1–1 | 2–2 | 0–7, 7-13/05 | 3–3 | 2–1 | 2–3 | 2–2 | 1–2 | 2–0 |
Verified results

One of the several trophies arranged in contention, presumably to favor the contests, was the one that was announced in the match to be played on 18 September 1927 between Racing and Sporting as a Queen's Cup, which was postponed due to time. There are two Racing-Sporting matches that are awarded to the maximalist league, one in November and the other in June. Racing won both, so we assume they would win the Queen's Cup. A triangular Spring Cup was also played between Español, Athletic de Madrid, and Osasuna, after the latter's admission to the League, and which the Catalans won.

== Development ==
The Liga Máxima, officially the Professional League of Foot-ball Clubs, began its journey in September 1927. The development of the season was irregular, with some games being played at the beginning of the season, alternating with the regional championships, with the league being interrupted by the development of the Spanish Championship, which had even more "pull" for the fans, and more matches being played at the end of the season, until July 1928. By then negotiations had already been resumed between minimalists and maximalists for the establishment of a championship of the league in the 1928–29 season, reaching an agreement. Finally, the Maximum League was left without completing all its matches. In addition, a tournament was held between the clubs eliminated from the Spanish championship, which competed for a very valuable cup (possibly this Sporting 1-2 Osasuna is from this tournament).

Óscar, international forward for Racing de Santander, scored 4 goals in the match against Celta played in Santander, with a record of goals for the season (Racing 7-4 Celta) and also scored 4 goals against Iberia. The greatest goal difference was Racing 9-0 Sevilla played in September in Santander (5–0 at half-time and Oscar scored the sixth goal) being the goal record of the Racing in an official league match with Racing 9-0 Alavés from the 1932–33 season.

48 matches were played, some of the 65 planned and others attributed to the League. At the end of 1927, the classification was led by Celta. 40 At the final moment (considering the Spring Cup and the matches that the press indicated in the League), the qualifying table was as follows, according to the usual score:

| | Equipo | Pts | PJ | G | E | P | GF | GC | Dif. | Notas |
|---|---|---|---|---|---|---|---|---|---|---|
| 1. | R. Santander Racing Club | 20 | 15 | 9 | 2 | 4 | 40 | 31 | +9 |
| 2. | R. C. D. Español | 17 | 12 | 8 | 1 | 3 | 44 | 20 | +24 |
| 3. | Real Club Celta | 14 | 10 | 5 | 4 | 1 | 29 | 20 | +9 |
| 4. | Iberia Sport Club | 13 | 10 | 6 | 1 | 4 | 23 | 24 | -1 |
| 5. | Real Sporting de Gijón | 12 | 15 | 5 | 2 | 8 | 44 | 45 | -1 |
| 6. | Real Murcia F. C. | 10 | 8 | 4 | 2 | 3 | 19 | 16 | +3 |
| 7. | Valencia F. C. | 9 | 12 | 3 | 3 | 6 | 19 | 33 | -14 |
| 8. | Sevilla F. C. | 9 | 15 | 3 | 3 | 9 | 27 | 44 | -17 |
| 9. | Athletic de Madrid | 8 | 12 | 3 | 2 | 7 | 26 | 39 | -13 |
| 10. | C. A. Osasuna | 2 | 2 | 1 | 0 | 1 | 4 | 8 | -4 | Only the Copa Primavera was contested |

Pts = Puntos; PJ = Partidos Jugados; G = Partidos Ganados; E = Partidos Empatados; P = Partidos Perdidos; GF = Goles Favor; GC = Goles Contra; Dif. = Diferencia Goles.

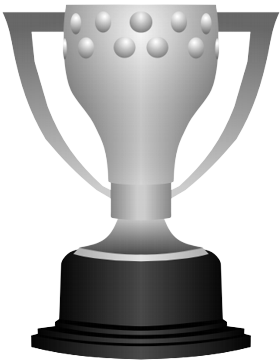
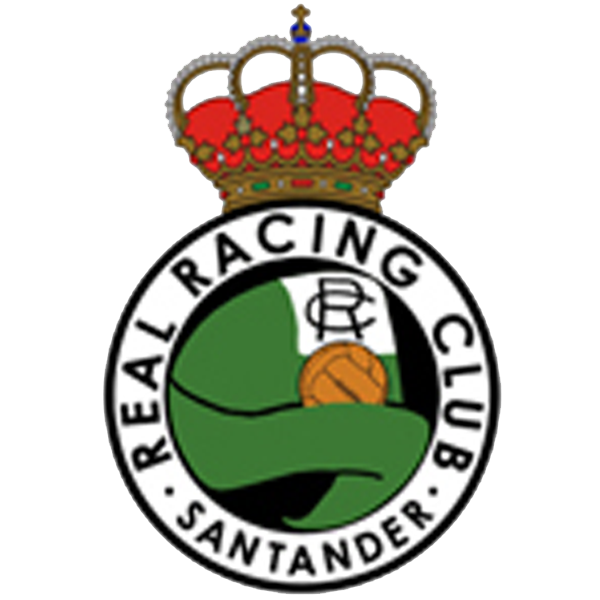
Virtual champion
Racing de Santander
Unfinished League

According to the initial score of the League (10/7/1927) (which awarded 3, 2, and 1 point), surely intended to encourage the participation of the teams and taking into account the scheduled matches played without Osasuna's matches in the Spring Cup, the classification was:

| Pos | Equipo | Pts | J | G | E | P | GF | GC |
|---|---|---|---|---|---|---|---|---|
| 1 | Racing de Santander | 37 | 16 | 10 | 2 | 4 | 53 | 32 |
| 2 | Sporting de Gijón | 25 | 14 | 5 | 2 | 7 | 40 | 42 |
| 3 | Sevilla FC | 24 | 15 | 3 | 3 | 9 | 22 | 43 |
| 4 | Iberia SC | 22 | 10 | 6 | 0 | 4 | 23 | 23 |
| 5 | RC Celta de Vigo | 21 | 9 | 4 | 4 | 1 | 24 | 19 |
| 6 | Valencia CF | 18 | 11 | 2 | 3 | 6 | 16 | 31 |
| 7 | RCD Español | 17 | 8 | 4 | 1 | 3 | 23 | 14 |
| 8 | Real Murcia | 17 | 9 | 4 | 1 | 3 | 18 | 15 |
| 9 | Atlético Madrid | 17 | 9 | 3 | 2 | 4 | 20 | 26 |

Pts = Points; PJ = Matches played; G = Matches won; E = Match drawn; P = Matches lost

According to the initial La Liga scoring system, most commonly reported in the press, taking into account scheduled matches played without Osasuna's Spring Cup matches, the standings were:

| Pos | Equipo | Pts | J | G | E | P | GF | GC |
|---|---|---|---|---|---|---|---|---|
| 1 | Racing de Santander | 22 | 16 | 10 | 2 | 4 | 53 | 32 |
| 2 | Celta de Vigo | 12 | 9 | 4 | 4 | 1 | 24 | 19 |
| 3 | Iberia SC | 12 | 10 | 6 | 0 | 4 | 23 | 23 |
| 4 | Sporting de Gijón | 12 | 13 | 5 | 2 | 7 | 40 | 42 |
| 5 | RCD Español | 9 | 8 | 4 | 1 | 3 | 23 | 14 |
| 6 | Real Murcia | 9 | 8 | 4 | 1 | 3 | 18 | 15 |
| 7 | Sevilla FC | 9 | 15 | 3 | 3 | 9 | 22 | 43 |
| 8 | Atlético Madrid | 8 | 9 | 2 | 3 | 4 | 21 | 26 |
| 9 | Valencia CF | 7 | 11 | 2 | 3 | 6 | 16 | 31 |

Pts = Points; PJ = Matches played; G = Matches won; E = Match drawn; P = Matches lost

=== Matches ===
The matches played to date have been the following:

1927

- 11 September:
  - Sporting 4–2 Sevilla (scheduled) Confirmed in classification
  - Celta 5–1 Ath. Madrid (Friendly)
- 18 September:
  - Iberia 3–1 Murcia (scheduled) Confirmed in classification
  - Celta 1–0 Sevilla (scheduled) Confirmed in classification
  - Athletic Madrid 2–6 Espanyol (Friendly)
- 25 September:
  - Sporting 0–3 Celta (scheduled) Confirmed in classification
  - Racing 9–0 Sevilla (scheduled) Confirmed in classification
- 2 October
  - Celta 3–0 Racing Confirmed in classification

Classification on 4 October

- 9 October
  - Racing 6–2 Iberia (scheduled) Confirmed in classification
  - Sevilla 2–2 Valencia (scheduled) Confirmed in classification
  - Ath. Madrid 3–3 Sporting (scheduled) Confirmed in classification
- 16 October
  - Murcia 2–0 Sporting (scheduled) Confirmed in classification
- 23 October
  - Sevilla 5–1 Ath. Madrid (scheduled) Confirmed in classification

Classification on 24 October.

- 30 October
  - Sporting - Murcia (scheduled, suspended by the Asturian federation and postponed to X)
- 1 November
  - Racing - Murcia (scheduled, suspended by the Asturian federation and postponed to X)
- 18 November
  - Racing 3–1 Sporting(scheduled) Confirmed in classification
- 20 November
  - Sporting - Iberia (scheduled and postponed to June)
- 27 November
  - Celta - Iberia (scheduled and postponed to June)
  - Valencia 2–3 Murcia (scheduled to 8 December Confirmed in classification

Classification on 28 November.

- 8 December
  - Sevilla 2–2 Celta (scheduled) Confirmed in classification
  - Sporting 2–3 Ath. Madrid (scheduled) Confirmed in classification
  - Murcia 0–1 Iberia (Scheduled to 15 January) Confirmed in classification

Classification on 9 December de 1927.

- 12 December
  - Murcia 1–1 Iberia (Friendly? o scheduled to 15 January)
- 19 December
  - Iberia 2–1 Racing (not scheduled, but played) Confirmed in classification
- 25 December
  - Sporting 7–2 Racing (scheduled) Confirmed in classification
  - Sevilla 4–2 Espanyol (scheduled) Confirmed in classification
  - Iberia - Valencia o Valencia - Iberia.
  - Murcia - Valencia (scheduled. Postponed to 29 January)

Classification on final December.

1928

- 1 January
  - Racing 7–4 Celta(scheduled) Confirmed in classification
- 7 January
  - Sevilla 4–0 Sporting (scheduled to 6 January) Confirmed in classification
- 9 January
  - Sporting 5–4 Sevilla (Friendly) (official and played in Seville when the Asturian federation banned matches at the Molinón)
  - Valencia 2–2 Celta Confirmed in classification

Classification on 10 January.

- 15 January
  - Murcia 2–3 Celta (scheduled to 6 January) Confirmed in classification
  - Ath. Madrid - Celta (scheduled and postponed to X)

Classification on 16 January.

| | Equipo | Pts | PJ | G | E | P | GF | GC | Dif. | Notas |
|---|---|---|---|---|---|---|---|---|---|---|
| 1. | Celta de Celta | 10 | 7 | 4 | 2 | 1 | 18 | 13 | +6 |
| 2. | Racing de Santander | 8 | 7 | 4 | 0 | 3 | 28 | 19 | +9 |
| 3. | Sevilla | 8 | 8 | 3 | 2 | 3 | 19 | 21 | -2 |
| 4. | Iberia SC | 6 | 4 | 3 | 0 | 1 | 8 | 8 | 0 |
| 5. | Sporting de Gijón | 5 | 8 | 2 | 1 | 5 | 17 | 22 | -5 |
| 6. | Real Murcia | 4 | 5 | 2 | 0 | 3 | 8 | 9 | -1 |
| 7. | Athletic de Madrid | 3 | 3 | 1 | 1 | 1 | 7 | 10 | -3 |
| 8. | Valencia | 2 | 6 | 3 | 2 | 1 | 6 | 7 | -1 |
| 9. | Espanyol | 0 | 1 | 0 | 0 | 1 | 2 | 4 | -2 |

- 22 January
  - Racing - Espanyol (scheduled)
  - Sevilla - Murcia (scheduled and postponed to X)
  - Celta - Sporting (scheduled)
- 29 January
  - Ath. Madrid - Sevilla (scheduled and postponed to 13 May)
  - Murcia - Valencia (scheduled)
- Review February
  - Valencia - Espanyol (suspended by the governor of Valencia, later disputed in June)
- 19 March
  - Sporting 3–5 Espanyol (scheduled to 29 January)
  - Sporting 3–3 Espanyol (Friendly)
- 16 April
  - Valencia 2–1 Iberia (scheduled)
  - Racing 2–0 Espanyol (scheduled)
- 29 April
  - Ath. Madrid 2–4 Espanyol (Friendly)
- 1 May
  - Espanyol 6–0 Osasuna (Friendly)
- 2 May
  - Osasuna 4–2 Ath. Madrid
- 13 May
  - Ath. Madrid 4–0 Sevilla (scheduled)
- 15 May
  - Sevilla 0–0 Espanyol (played in Madrid) (scheduled)
- 17 May
  - Iberia 4–2 Sevilla (scheduled)
  - Celta 1–1 Valencia (scheduled to 20, but conditioned since Valencia could be a finalist in the Spanish Cup Championship)
  - Ath. Madrid - Espanyol (scheduled and postponed to June)
- 20 May
  - Sporting - Valencia (scheduled to 17, but conditioned since Valencia could be a finalist in the Spanish Cup Championship)
  - Iberia - Sporting (scheduled)
  - Murcia - Ath. Madrid (scheduled and postponed to 3 June)
  - Sporting 5–1 Valencia (scheduled to 17)
  - Iberia 3–2 Espanyol (scheduled to 27)
- 27 May
  - Murcia - Racing (scheduled and postponed to 10 June)
  - Ath. Madrid 5–2 Valencia (scheduled to 3 June)
  - Celta 5–5 Sporting (scheduled)
- Revisar
  - Espanyol 5–2 Sevilla (played in Córdoba)
  - Osasuna 5–4 Sevilla (Friendly) (Friendly after Osasuna's entry into the League)
  - Espanyol 4–2 Iberia(played in Zaragoza)
- 3 June
  - Espanyol 3–0 Racing (played in Valencia) (scheduled)
  - Murcia - Sevilla (scheduled)
  - Celta - Iberia (scheduled)
- 7 June
  - Sporting 5–0 Iberia (scheduled)
  - Ath. Madrid - Espanyol (scheduled)
  - Valencia 1–2 Racing (scheduled)
- 10 June
  - Espanyol - Celta (scheduled, en Madrid)
  - Iberia 4–0 Ath. Madrid (scheduled)
  - Murcia 3–3 Racing (scheduled)
- 11 June
  - Valencia 0–7 Espanyol (scheduled to 6 May)
- 16 June
  - Racing - Murcia (scheduled)
- 17 June
  - Ath. Madrid - Celta (scheduled)
  - Iberia - Valencia (scheduled)
  - Murcia 3–1 Valencia (scheduled to 27 May)
- 24 June
  - Iberia - Celta (scheduled)
  - Racing - Murcia (scheduled)
  - Sporting - Sevilla (Friendly)
- 25 June
  - Valencia 2–0 Sevilla (scheduled to 10 June)
  - Racing 5–2 Sporting (scheduled and suspended due to bad weather to 18 September)
- 29 June
  - Sporting - Murcia (scheduled)
  - Racing - Sevilla (scheduled)
- Revisar
  - Murcia 4–2 Ath. Madrid (correspondiente a la Liga)
  - Sevilla 0–3 Racing (played in Santander in 29/6/1928)
- 1 July
  - Racing 4–1 Sevilla (Friendly) (scheduled)
  - Celta - Murcia (scheduled)
- 8 July
  - Iberia - Sporting (scheduled)
- Septiembre
  - Racing 4–1 Ath. Madrid
  - Ath. Madrid 2–2 Racing
- Revisar
  - Murcia - Espanyol (scheduled)
  - Espanyol - Murcia (scheduled. Presumably played in Murcia)

=== Top goal scorer ===
The top scorer of the competition was Óscar of Racing de Santander with 19 goals): Racing 3–1 Sporting: 2 goals Racing 2–0 Espanyol: 1 goal Racing 7–4 Celta: 4 goals Racing 6–2 Iberia: 4 goals Racing 2–1 Valencia: 1 goal Racing 3–0 Sevilla: 2 goals Racing 9–0 Sevilla: 2 goals- He also scored three goals in the two September matches against Athletic Madrid.

== See also ==
- 1928 Copa del Rey
