= 1927 Copa del Rey =

1927 King Alfonso XIII's Cup
27th Copa del Rey

Tournament details
- Country: Spain

Final positions
- Champions: Real Unión (3rd title)
- Runners-up: Arenas Club de Guecho

Tournament statistics
- Matches played: 4
- Goals scored: 13 (3.25 per match)

The King Alfonso XIII's Cup 1927 was the 27th staging of the Copa del Rey, the Spanish football cup competition.

== Teams ==
Champions and runners-up of each regional championship were able to participate in the tournament. 26 teams entered the competition, making a new record of participants.

- Aragón Region: Iberia SC, Zaragoza CD
- Asturias Region: Sporting de Gijón, Club Fortuna
- Cantabria Region: Racing de Santander, Gimnástica de Torrelavega
- Castile and León Region: Real Unión Deportiva, CD Español Valladolid
- Catalonia Region: FC Barcelona, CD Europa
- Extremadura Region: CD Extremeño, Patria FC
- Galicia Region: Celta de Vigo, Deportivo de La Coruña
- Gipuzkoa Region: Real Unión, Real Sociedad
- Murcia Region: Real Murcia, Cartagena FC
- Centre Region: Real Madrid, Athletic Madrid
- South Region: Sevilla FC, Real Betis
- Levante Region: Valencia CF, CD Castellón
- Biscay Region: Athletic Bilbao, Arenas Club de Getxo

== Group stage ==
=== Group 1 ===
Team	Pld	W	D	L	GF	GA	Pts
Real Madrid	4	3	0	1	20	9	6
Sevilla FC	4	3	0	1	21	6	6
CD Extremeño	4	0	0	4	7	33	0

February 27, 1927
CD Extremeño	2–11	Sevilla FC
March 6, 1927
Real Madrid	9–4	CD Extremeño
March 13, 1927
Sevilla FC	2–1	Real Madrid
March 20, 1927
Sevilla FC	6–0	CD Extremeño
March 27, 1927
CD Extremeño	1–7	Real Madrid
April 3, 1927
Real Madrid	3–2	Sevilla FC
Tie break: (in Badajoz)
April 10, 1927
Real Madrid	3–1	Sevilla FC

=== Group 2 ===
Team	Pld	W	D	L	GF	GA	Pts
CD Europa	4	2	0	2	8	4	4
CD Castellón	4	2	0	2	4	6	4
Cartagena FC	4	2	0	2	2	4	4

Tie-break league:

Team	Pld	W	D	L	GF	GA	Pts
CD Europa	2	2	0	0	5	1	4
CD Castellón	2	1	0	1	3	3	2
Cartagena FC	2	0	0	2	2	6	0

February 27, 1927
CD Castellón	1–0	Cartagena FC
March 6, 1927
Cartagena FC	1–0	CD Europa
March 13, 1927
CD Europa	4–1	CD Castellón
March 20, 1927
Cartagena FC	1–0	CD Castellón
March 27, 1927
CD Europa	3–0	Cartagena FC
April 3, 1927
CD Castellón	2–1	CD Europa
Tie break: (in Madrid)
April 7, 1927
CD Europa	3–1	Cartagena FC
April 10, 1927
CD Europa	2–0	CD Castellón
April 12, 1927
CD Castellón	3–1	Cartagena FC

=== Group 3 ===
Team	Pld	W	D	L	GF	GA	Pts
Sporting de Gijón	6	5	1	0	25	7	11
Deportivo de La Coruña	6	3	2	1	18	9	8
Racing de Santander	6	1	2	3	16	19	4
Real Unión de Valladolid	6	0	1	5	9	33	1

February 27, 1927
Sporting de Gijón	4–1	Deportivo de La Coruña
Real Unión de Valladolid	4–4	Racing de Santander
March 6, 1927
Racing de Santander	2–4	Sporting de Gijón
Deportivo de La Coruña	8–0	Real Unión de Valladolid
March 13, 1927
Deportivo de La Coruña	4–1	Racing de Santander
Real Unión de Valladolid	1–3	Sporting de Gijón
March 20, 1927
Racing de Santander	1–1	Deportivo de La Coruña
Sporting de Gijón	9–0	Real Unión de Valladolid
March 27, 1927
Deportivo de La Coruña	1–1	Sporting de Gijón
Racing de Santander	6–2	Real Unión de Valladolid
April 3, 1927
Sporting de Gijón	4–2	Racing de Santander
Real Unión de Valladolid	2–3	Deportivo de La Coruña

=== Group 4 ===
Team	Pld	W	D	L	GF	GA	Pts
Real Unión	4	3	0	1	9	7	6
Athletic de Bilbao	4	3	0	1	7	1	6
Zaragoza CD	4	0	0	4	2	10	0

February 27, 1927
Athletic de Bilbao	1–0	Zaragoza CD
March 6, 1927
Zaragoza CD	1–2	Real Unión
March 13, 1927
Real Unión	1–0	Athletic de Bilbao
March 19, 1927
Zaragoza CD	0–1	Athletic de Bilbao
March 27, 1927
Real Unión	6–1	Zaragoza CD
April 3, 1927
Athletic de Bilbao	5–0	Real Unión
Tie break: (in Zaragoza)
April 10, 1927
Real Unión	2–1	Athletic Bilbao

=== Group 5 ===
Team	Pld	W	D	L	GF	GA	Pts
FC Barcelona	4	3	0	1	10	3	6
Valencia CF	4	2	0	2	10	6	4
Real Murcia	4	1	0	3	4	15	2

February 27, 1927
Real Murcia	2–1	Valencia CF
March 6, 1927
FC Barcelona	5–0	Real Murcia
March 13, 1927
Valencia CF	2–0	FC Barcelona
March 20, 1927
Valencia CF	7–1	Real Murcia
March 27, 1927
Real Murcia	1–2	FC Barcelona
April 3, 1927
FC Barcelona	3–0	Valencia CF

=== Group 6 ===
Team	Pld	W	D	L	GF	GA	Pts
Real Betis	4	3	1	0	14	2	7
Athletic Madrid	4	2	1	1	11	8	5
Patria FC	4	0	0	4	5	20	0

February 27, 1927
Real Betis	6–0	Patria FC
March 6, 1927
Patria FC	4–6	Athletic Madrid
March 13, 1927
Athletic Madrid	1–1	Real Betis
March 20, 1927
Patria FC	0–5	Real Betis
March 27, 1927
Athletic Madrid	3–1	Patria FC
April 3, 1927
Real Betis	2–1	Athletic Madrid

=== Group 7 ===
Team	Pld	W	D	L	GF	GA	Pts
Arenas Club de Getxo	4	3	0	1	12	6	6
Real Sociedad	4	3	0	1	15	7	6
Iberia SC	4	0	0	4	2	16	0

February 27, 1927
Iberia SC	0–1	Arenas Club de Getxo
March 6, 1927
Real Sociedad	5–0	Iberia SC
March 13, 1927
Arenas Club de Getxo	4–2	Real Sociedad
March 20, 1927
Arenas Club de Getxo	6–0	Iberia SC
March 27, 1927
Iberia SC	2–4	Real Sociedad
April 3, 1927
Real Sociedad	4–1	Arenas Club de Getxo
Tie break: (in Madrid)
April 10, 1927
Arenas Club de Getxo	2–1	Real Sociedad

=== Group 8 ===
Team	Pld	W	D	L	GF	GA	Pts
Celta Vigo	6	6	0	0	34	8	12
Gimnástica Torrelavega	6	2	1	3	13	16	5
Fortuna de Gijón	6	2	0	4	14	22	4
Español de Valladolid	6	1	1	4	6	21	3

February 27, 1927
Gimnástica Torrelavega	4–0	Espanol de Valladolid
Celta Vigo	8–2	Fortuna de Gijón
March 6, 1927
Fortuna de Gijón	2–1	Gimnástica Torrelavega
Espanol de Valladolid	0–3	Celta Vigo
March 13, 1927
Gimnástica Torrelavega	1–6	Celta Vigo
Fortuna de Gijón	4–3	Espanol de Valladolid
March 20, 1927
Celta Vigo	5–2	Gimnástica Torrelavega
Espanol de Valladolid	2–1	Fortuna de Gijón
March 27, 1927
Espanol de Valladolid	1–1	Gimnástica Torrelavega
Fortuna de Gijón	3–4	Celta Vigo
April 3, 1927
Gimnástica Torrelavega	4–2	Fortuna de Gijón
Celta Vigo	8–0	Espanol de Valladolid

== Knockout phase ==
Quarterfinals; April 17, April 24, May 1
Sporting de Gijón	3	1	1
Real Unión	2	4	3
Real Madrid	2	1	8
CD Europa	0	4	1
Arenas Club	3	1	3
Celta de Vigo	1	3	2
FC Barcelona	4	0	1
Real Betis	1	1	0

Semifinals; May 8
Real Unión	2
Real Madrid	0
Arenas Club	4
FC Barcelona	3

Final; May 15, Torrero, Zaragoza
Real Unión (a.e.t.)	1
Arenas Club	0

=== Quarterfinals ===
First leg:

April 17, 1927
Sporting Gijón	3–2	Real Unión
Real Madrid	2–0	CE Europa
Arenas Club de Getxo	3–1	Celta Vigo
FC Barcelona	4–1	Real Betis
Second leg:
April 24, 1927
Real Unión	4–1	Sporting Gijón
CE Europa	4–1	Real Madrid
Celta Vigo	3–1	Arenas Club de Getxo
Real Betis	1–0	FC Barcelona
Tie break:
May 1, 1927
Real Unión	3–1	Sporting Gijón
Real Madrid	8–1	CE Europa
Arenas Club de Getxo	3–2	Celta Vigo
FC Barcelona	1–0	Real Betis

=== Semifinals ===
May 8, 1927

Played in Zaragoza :
Real Unión	2–0	Real Madrid
Arenas Club de Getxo	4–3	FC Barcelona

=== Final ===
15 May 1927
17:15 CET

Real Unión	1–0 (a.e.t.)	Arenas Club de Getxo
Echeveste 117'

Estadio Torrero, Zaragoza
Attendance: 16,000
Referee: Pedro Escartín

Copa del Rey 1927 winners
Real Unión de Irun
3rd title

== Special Trophy ==
An additional trophy presented by the King, and therefore also labelled a 'Copa del Rey' was played for in May 1927 involving Motherwell and Swansea Town who were both on tour in Spain at the time and generated much local interest. The British clubs played off with Motherwell winning 4–3 to earn the right to face hosts Real Madrid. The Scots won 3–1 and claimed the special trophy.
