= Gayarre =

Gayarre is a Spanish surname. Notable people with the surname include:

- Carmen Gayarre Galbete (1900–1996), Spanish pioneer in the education of people with intellectual disabilities
- Charles Gayarré (1805–1895), American historian, attorney, and politician
- José Antonio Gayarre (born 1940), Spanish politician
- José María Gayarre (1893–1968), Spanish journalist, football pioneer, and sports leader
- Julián Gayarre (1844–1890), Spanish opera singer
- Valentín Gayarre (1870–1938), Spanish politician
