= 1930–31 Segunda División =

3nd season of the second-tier football league in Spain

Segunda División
- Season: 1930–31
- Champions: Valencia FC
- Promoted: Valencia FC
- Relegated: Iberia SC
- Matches: 90
- Goals: 350 (3.89 per match)
- Top goalscorer: Adolfo Suárez (18 goals)
- Best goalkeeper: Enrique Cano (1.39 goals/match)
- Biggest home win: Sporting de Gijón 9–0 Real Murcia (18 January 1931)
- Biggest away win: Real Murcia 0–3 Athletic Club Madrid (4 January 1931)
- Highest scoring: Sporting de Gijón 9–0 Real Murcia (18 January 1931); Sporting de Gijón 7–2 CD Castellón (8 March 1931); Deportivo La Coruña 5–4 Real Murcia (1 February 1931)

The 1930–31 Segunda División season saw 10 teams participate in the second flight Spanish league. Valencia was promoted to Primera División. Iberia was relegated to Tercera División.

== Teams ==
Location of teams in Segunda División 1930-31

Club	City	Stadium
Athletic Club Madrid	Madrid	Metropolitano
Real Betis	Seville	Patronato Obrero
CD Castellón	Castellón de la Plana	El Sequiol
Deportivo de La Coruña	La Coruña	Riazor
Iberia SC	Zaragoza	Torrero
Real Murcia	Murcia	La Condomina
Real Oviedo	Oviedo	Buenavista
Sevilla FC	Seville	Nervión
Sporting de Gijón	Gijón	El Molinón
Valencia FC	Valencia	Mestalla

== Final table ==
Pos	Team	Pld	W	D	L	GF	GA	GD	Pts	Promotion or relegation
1	Valencia FC	18	12	2	4	37	25	+12	26	Promoted to Primera División
2	Sevilla FC	18	10	3	5	42	26	+16	23	
3	Athletic Club Madrid	18	11	1	6	47	31	+16	23	
4	R. Sporting de Gijón	18	8	2	8	50	31	+19	18	
5	CD Castellón	18	6	6	6	27	31	−4	18	
6	Real Betis	18	7	3	8	25	39	−14	17	
7	Real Murcia FC	18	6	2	10	28	45	−17	14	
8	Real Oviedo FC	18	4	6	8	39	41	−2	14	
9	Deportivo de La Coruña	18	6	2	10	32	43	−11	14	
10	Iberia SC	18	5	3	10	23	38	−15	13	Relegated to Tercera División

Source: BDFútbol

== Results ==
Home \ Away	ATL	BET	CAS	DEP	IBE	MUR	OVI	SEV	SPO	VAL
Athletic Club Madrid		5–1	3–0	1–0	4–1	6–1	3–2	2–0	4–1	3–0
Betis Balompié	2–3		1–1	4–3	2–1	3–0	3–2	0–1	2–0	0–1
CD Castellón	4–1	1–2		2–1	4–0	1–3	1–0	3–3	1–0	1–1
Deportivo de La Coruña	5–2	2–1	1–1		4–0	5–4	4–4	2–1	1–0	1–2
Iberia SC	1–0	2–0	0–0	2–0		1–2	2–1	0–2	3–3	5–0
Real Murcia	0–3	1–2	1–2	4–0	1–1		3–2	2–1	4–1	1–2
Real Oviedo	4–1	2–2	2–2	4–1	5–3	1–1		3–3	3–1	1–1
Sevilla FC	3–1	0–0	3–1	5–2	3–0	4–1	3–0		4–1	5–0
Sporting de Gijón	2–2	5–0	7–2	3–0	5–1	9–0	2–1	6–0		2–1
Valencia FC	4–3	6–0	2–0	3–0	2–0	2–0	5–2	3–0	2–1	

Source: BDFútbol
Legend: Blue = home team win; Yellow = draw; Red = away team win.
