= José María Gayarre =

Spanish journalist and sports leader (1893–1968)

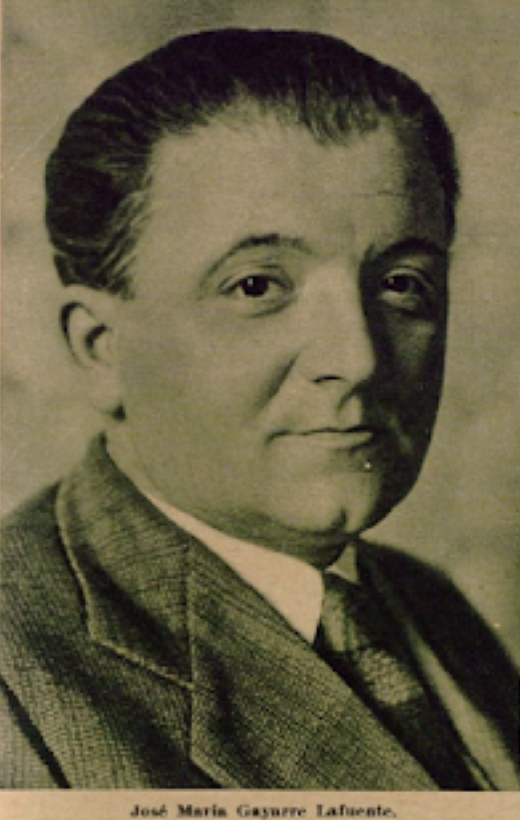
- Gayarre
- Born: José María Gayarre Lafuente; 8 February 1893; Zaragoza, Spain
- Died: 8 February 1968 (aged 75); Madrid, Spain
- Citizenship: Spanish
- Occupations: Journalist; Football pioneer; Sports leader
- Known for: 1st President of Aragonese Football Federation
- Political party: Citizen Action Party

1st President of Sociedad Gimnástica Zaragozana
- In office 1912–1915

1st President of Aragonese Football Federation
- In office 13 September 1922 – 1923
- Succeeded by: José María Muniesa

Last president of Iberia Sport Club
- In office Unknown–1932
- Preceded by: Pedro Galán

1st president of Real Zaragoza
- In office 15 March 1932 – 17 August 1934
- Succeeded by: Juan José Navarro

José María Gayarre Lafuente (8 February 1893 – 8 February 1968) was a Spanish journalist, football pioneer, and sports leader. Despite never playing football, he was one of the most important figures in the amateur beginnings of this sport in Zaragoza, being noted for his prominent role in promoting football in the city and for founding and presiding over the first football clubs in the region, such as Sociedad Gimnástica Zaragozana in 1912 and Iberia Sport Club in 1917, and later Real Zaragoza in 1932, holding the presidency for two years. He was also the fundamental head behind the foundation of Aragonese Football Federation in 1922, which he also presided.

He also worked as a referee in some of those first football matches in Zaragoza.

== Early life and education ==
Born in Zaragoza on 8 February 1893, Gayarre attended high school at the Escolapios and enrolled in the Faculty of Chemistry, although he did not graduate; he later defined himself as "a bad student". However, his contact with the university allowed him to interact with the most advanced circles of Zaragoza society and to immerse himself in sporting culture.

== Football career ==
=== Football pioneer in Zaragoza ===
Gayarre fell in love with the sport of football when he visited Río Tinto and saw the English from the mines practicing this sport under the umbrella of Club Inglés Bella Vista. There he bought a pair of old balls, which a shoemaker on Calle las Armas would later mend for him, as well as some boots and a book about the regulations of the game, written in English, and returned to Zaragoza in order to serve as an apostolate of this new game. He taught the game to the youth of some schools, spending hours watching the school children fight over the ball in the Sepulcro field, and it can be said that he introduced football to Zaragoza. Gayarre worked not only as a teacher and tutor of the sport, but also as a referee in some of those first football matches in Zaragoza. The journalist Miguel Gay Berges once wrote an article about his first meeting with Gayarre, who explained to him what an "offside" was, stating that he "understood football, so much so that many times we did not understand him".

In 1912, the 19-year-old Gayarre founded and presided over the Sociedad Gimnástica Zaragozana club, which began his career in the Zurita Street Field to, almost immediately, build the first proper football pitch titled Campo de la Química because it was located next to the land of the Industrial Química company. Dressed in a black t-shirt and black pants, Gimnástica was the first serious club in Zaragoza, competing with clubs from the neighboring provinces and even some from the Basque Country until, at the end of 1915, when it disappeared due to lack of financial support and fans.

He was also vice president and sports director of the Campo de Deportes de Torrero Limited Company.

=== Iberia Sport Club ===
At the beginning of 1917, the Abinzano brothers (Jesús and Julio), recently arrived from Argentina, contacted Gayarre to establish a new club, taking advantage of his extensive contacts with the players who had played at Gimnástica, mostly being former students of Colegio de El Salvador, governed by the Jesuits, then the most elite school in Zaragoza. Gayarre, enthusiastic about the idea, gave them the black uniforms that he still had from Gimnástica and thus, on one of the benches in the popular Plaza del Pilar, on 24 March, the Iberia Sport Club was formed, chaired by Ricardo Ostalé. Several of the founders had played in Gimnástica's youth team, Juvenia, and some of its footballers came from the Basque youth academy, a niche controlled by Gayarre, or from the streets of Zaragoza. Since its founding, Iberia, known as "the Wasps" due to their black-and-white uniform, was the great engine and lighthouse of football in Aragon, surrounding itself almost immediately with the staff of the Carde-Escoriaza foundry company, such as Juan Antonio Burges, the Basilio brothers, and Félix Berdejo, who worked as draftsmen at Carde-Escoriaza where, in addition to followers, it also gained players, creating a homogeneous community that constantly devoted itself to its team.

In 1918, after the board chaired by Francisco Ginés, who had replaced Basilio Berdejo and who in turn had replaced Ostalé, refused to support the constitution of the Aragonese Federation, his brother Luis Gayarre assumed the presidency, the one who held the position the longest and who built the Torrero field in 1923. He gave the society a new perspective to launch itself to the conquest of regional football, winning the unofficial regional championships of Aragon in 1918, 1919, 1920, and 1921.

=== Aragonese Federation ===
Gayarre worked tirelessly to create an independent Aragonese Federation, since in those early years of Aragonese football, there was more than one attempt from the Catalan Football Federation to absorb it. On 21 September 1919, he founded the Federation of Sports Societies of Zaragoza, which was meant to serve as the embryo of the Aragonese Football Federation (AFF), but personal differences and clashes derailed the enterprise and it was dissolved on 8 March 1920. Gayarre, however, did not give up, and on 4 January 1922, he drafted and presented to the Civil Government of Zaragoza a set of regulations for the AFF, and then sent a letter to the presidents of the Aragonese clubs summoning them to the founding meeting on 25 January, when the AFF was founded by Iberia SC, together with three other local clubs. Two months later, on 22 March, these clubs formed the Aragonese Federation of Sports Societies, which had two sections, football and athletics, and again with Gayarre as president, but eventually the football section was split, creating the Aragonese Federation of Football Clubs.

On 21 June 1922, Gayarre requested the admission of the AFF into the Royal Spanish Football Federation (RFEF), which approved it by acclamation at its ordinary assembly held on 20 and 21 July in Vigo. On 22 August, he received a letter from the RFEF stating that "the Aragonese Federation has been admitted to the last Assembly, subject to qualifying it in the extraordinary session in September". Likewise, the AFF was finally founded on 13 September 1922, and Gayarre was naturally named as its first president, and as such, he gave legal support to all regional football and made Iberia's voice heard throughout Spain. Two weeks later, on 28 September, the AFF held its first ordinary assembly, where they drafted the regulations and statutes of the federation, being definitively constituted on 1 October at the request of the national assembly. In the following month, on 17 October 1922, Madrid FC played its first game in Zaragoza, which was a El Clásico at the newly inaugurated Campo Municipal de Delicias, which was won by FC Barcelona, but the highlight of the game was when the referee Aizpurua decided to send off Josep Samitier, who refused to leave the pitch, so Gayarre, then the president of the Aragonese Association of Physical Culture, decided to intervene by naming himself referee, with Aizpurua serving the rest of the match as a linesman.

He held the presidency for just one year, until 1923, when he was replaced by José María Muniesa. As a member of the AFF, Gayarre actively participated in the stormy assemblies of the RFEF where such important issues as professionalism (1926), the creation of La Liga (1928–29), and the organization of promotions and relegations were elucidated.

=== Real Zaragoza ===
Just like his brother, Gayarre eventually became the president of Iberia SC, replacing Pedro Galán and holding this position until 15 March 1932, when five members of Iberia, the Gayarre brothers, Muniesa, Antonio Sánchez Candial, and Luis Ferrer, and five others from Zaragoza Club Deportivo signed a deed to merge the clubs and to form the current Real Zaragoza. Two weeks later, on 1 April 1932, he was named second vice-president and acting president of the club, initially as an interim and later as a permanent president. The club's first coach was a former Iberia defender, Elías Sauca, who acted as player-coach until the end of the season, when he was replaced by the Portuguese Filipe dos Santos, under whom the Zaragoza team finally saw its first successes when the club almost achieved promotion during its debut in the Tercera Division.

In the 1933–34 season, the club achieved promotion to the Segunda División, which required Zaragoza to need at least 15 to 20 thousand pesetas, which Gayarre described as "a ridiculous figure", who stated that "with such an amount the club will be saved, but it is inhumane to continue asking those who have already made so many sacrifices for Zaragoza". This situation, coupled with the fatigue of the responsibility of the presidency, led him to announce his irrevocable resignation, after which the club's most prominent members, mainly the old guard of Iberia, those who had never failed, did not hesitate to organize a tribute to Gayarre in the form of a dinner at the Salduba restaurant on 28 July. He held the Zaragoza presidency for two years, from 18 March 1932 until 17 August 1934, when he was replaced by Juan José Navarro.

After his resignation, Gayarre immediately went to the club's secretariat, from where he set up the Zaragoza team that achieved the long-awaited promotion to the First Division in 1936. A year and a half earlier, in January 1935, the AFF awarded him its first Medal for Sporting Merit. In 1952, he wrote that "Iberia changed its name and colors, but it did not change its style, and its survival is assured as long as the essential virtues that gave him life. Iberia made possible all the brilliant performances of Aragonese football.

=== Spanish Football Federation ===
In the mid-1930s, Gayarre befriended Commander Julián Troncoso, a director of Zaragoza since 1934 and a great promoter of Aragonese athletics; in May 1937, he actively participated in the meetings in San Sebastián for the creation of the Spanish Federation of the national zone, becoming the right-hand man of its first president, Troncoso, and playing a key role in the development of this federation in the first months of its life in 1937.

Despite his adherence to the National Movement, Gayarre also suffered the effects of the Spanish Civil War, having to leave Zaragoza in 1938 when it was revealed that he was homosexual. He first went to San Sebastián, where he continued to collaborate with Troncoso, and when the conflict was over he settled in Madrid, far from his family and friends, and distanced himself from the football scene. His absence proved costly for Zaragoza, who returned to the Third Division in 1947, being on the verge of disappearing. Six years later, in 1953, President Cesáreo Alierta brought him back as a technical advisor and gave him full powers, but Gayarre only lasted one season in office because his return was not welcomed unanimously by the club and there were people interested in not having him.

== Journalist career ==
Professionally, Gayarre was a sales representative for various wineries in Haro and Jerez, as well as an administrative employee, and later a manager, of the Portland cement factory. In addition, he worked as a sports journalist in the Zaragoza newspapers Diario de Avisos, El Noticiero, and Heraldo de Aragón, where he signed with the pseudonyms Goal and XXX. He had an agile, cultivated and very entertaining pen, although the exercise of sports journalism was just a means to promote and consolidate football.

Gayarre was also a notable speaker, with his lectures advocating for sport becoming famous throughout Aragon, which successively toured the halls of the Café de Europa, Salduba El Oriental, and La Perla.

== Political career ==
His political concerns led him to found and preside over the "Citizen Action Party" in 1921, with a clear pro-Maurist leaning, and he even ran in the municipal elections of 5 February 1922, but despite not being elected, Gayarre persisted and was then elected as a provincial deputy for the Pilar-La Almunia district in June 1923, the last elections held in Spain before the military coup of General Miguel Primo de Rivera.

== Death ==
Gayarre died in Madrid on 8 February 1968, at the age of 75. Just before he died, however, he had time to see his Real Zaragoza win two Copa del Rey titles in 1963–64 and 1965–66.
