= 1929–30 Segunda División =

2st season of the second-tier football league in Spain

Segunda División
- Season: 1929–30
- Champions: Deportivo Alavés
- Promoted: Deportivo Alavés
- Relegated: Cultural y Deportiva Leonesa
- Matches: 90
- Goals: 349 (3.88 per match)
- Top goalscorer: Manuel Olivares (23 goals)

The 1929–30 Segunda División season saw 10 teams participate in the second flight Spanish league. Alavés was promoted to Primera División. Cultural Leonesa was relegated to Tercera División.

== Teams ==
=== Stadia and locations ===
Location of (qualified) teams in Segunda División

Team	Home city	Stadium
Club Deportivo Alavés	Vitoria	Mendizorrotza
Real Sporting de Gijón	Gijón	El Molinón
Iberia Sport Club	Zaragoza	Torrero
Sevilla Football Club	Sevilla	Nervión
Real Oviedo Football Club	Oviedo	Teatinos
Valencia Football Club	Valencia	Mestalla
Real Club Deportivo de La Coruña	A Coruña	Riazor
Real Murcia Football Club	Murcia	La Condomina
Real Betis Balompié	Sevilla	Patronato Obrero
Cultural y Deportiva Leonesa	León	Campo de Guzmán

== League table ==
Pos	Team	Pld	W	D	L	GF	GA	GD	Pts	Promotion or relegation
1	Deportivo Alavés	18	9	4	5	44	19	+25	22	Promoted to Primera División
2	Sporting de Gijón	18	9	3	6	29	28	+1	21	
3	Iberia SC	18	6	9	3	26	22	+4	21	
4	Sevilla FC	18	9	2	7	41	26	+15	20	
5	Real Oviedo FC	18	8	2	8	37	44	−7	18	
6	Valencia FC	18	7	4	7	40	43	−3	18	
7	Deportivo de La Coruña	18	6	5	7	33	37	−4	17	
8	Real Murcia	18	6	3	9	40	50	−10	15	
9	Real Betis	18	6	2	10	29	39	−10	14	
10	Cultural Leonesa	18	5	4	9	30	41	−11	14	Relegated to Tercera División

Source: RSSSF

== Results ==
Home \ Away	ALA	BET	CDL	DEP	IBE	MUR	OVI	SEV	SPO	VAL
Deportivo Alavés		2–0	5–0	5–1	0–0	5–0	6–0	5–0	3–1	4–1
Betis Balompié	3–2		2–1	3–1	1–1	2–1	5–2	0–2	2–4	5–2
Cultural y Deportiva Leonesa	1–1	2–2		2–2	0–1	4–0	3–1	2–0	4–0	0–3
Deportivo de La Coruña	4–0	1–0	4–3		3–0	3–4	4–1	0–0	0–0	3–1
Iberia SC	1–0	4–1	2–2	0–0		2–0	4–1	2–2	0–0	3–3
Real Murcia	2–2	4–0	3–4	6–2	1–1		4–4	2–1	3–0	4–6
Real Oviedo	0–1	4–1	3–0	2–1	2–2	1–3		3–2	2–1	5–0
Sevilla FC	2–1	2–0	6–1	4–1	1–2	6–1	4–0		2–0	4–0
Sporting de Gijón	2–1	2–1	3–0	4–1	2–0	3–2	1–3	2–1		2–1
Valencia FC	1–1	2–1	3–1	2–2	3–1	4–0	2–3	4–2	2–2	

Source: RSSSF
Legend: Blue = home team win; Yellow = draw; Red = away team win.
