= Gimnástica de Torrelavega =

Association football club in Spain

- Full name: Real Sociedad Gimnástica de Torrelavega
- Nicknames: Gimnástica, Gimnásticos; Blanquiazules (Blue and white), Montañeses (Highlanders), Club del Besaya (Team from Besaya)
- Founded: 28 September 1907; 119 years ago
- Stadium: El Malecón
- Capacity: 6,007
- President: Siro del Barrio
- Head coach: Manu Calleja
- League: Segunda Federación – Group 1
- 2025–26: Tercera Federación – Group 3, 1st of 18 (champions)
- Website: rsgimnastica.com
Home colours	Away colours

Real Sociedad Gimnástica de Torrelavega is a Spanish football team based in Torrelavega, in the autonomous community of Cantabria. Founded on 28 September 1907 it is the oldest football club in the region, and currently plays in Segunda Federación – Group 1, holding home matches at Campos del Malecón, with a capacity of 6,007 seats.

== History ==
Gimnasticá de Torrelavega was founded in 1907. This makes the club one of the oldest football teams in Spain, as well as the oldest professional team from Cantabria. The team played mostly friendly matches before 1925, as there were not any organized football leagues in Spain prior to that. The team first played in the regional league of Cantabria for three seasons, before being accepted into Tercera Division in 1929. Gimnastica played there for two years, before switching back to the regional league of Cantabria.

Their first touch of professional football came in 1939, when the team was promote for the first time to Segunda División, after league was expanded into 40 teams divide on five groups. They remained there only one season, and were relegated. Gimnastica did not return to the second tier until 1949, when they managed to finish in fifth place in the 1949–50 season. They remained there for five seasons, being relegated after the 1953–54 season.

Following their relegation, Gimnastica spent 12 seasons in Tercera, before promoting back to Segunda in 1966. Their third spell in the second division lasted two years. Following that, the team bounced between Segunda Division B, Tercera and the regional leagues. Gimnastica de Torrelavega currently plays in Tercera Division, following their immediate relegation from Segunda B at the end of the 2018–19 season.

=== Club background ===
- RS Gimnástica de Torrelavega – (1907–30)
- Club Deportivo Torrelavega – (1930–43)
- RS Gimnástica de Torrelavega – (1943–)

== Honours ==
- Segunda División B: (1) 1999–2000
- Tercera División: (12) 1933–34, 1961–62, 1964–65, 1965–66, 1989–90, 1995–96, 2005–06, 2007–08, 2008–09, 2013–14, 2016–17, 2017–18
- Tercera División RFEF: (1) 2021–22

== Season to season ==
Season	Tier	Division	Place	Copa del Rey
1925–26	1	1ª Reg.	2nd	Group stage
1926–27	1	1ª Reg.	2nd	Group stage
1927–28	1	1ª Reg.	1st	Group stage
1929	3	3ª	4th	Round of 16
1929–30	3	3ª	4th	Round of 32
1930–31	6	3ª Reg.	1st	
1931–32	5	2ª Reg.	1st	
1932–33	4	1ª Reg.	2nd	Round of 32
1933–34	3	3ª	1st	
1934–35	4	1ª Reg.	3rd	
1935–36	4	1ª Reg.	3rd	
1939–40	2	2ª	8th	
1940–41	3	3ª	2nd	
1941–42	DNP			
1942–43	4	1ª Reg.	5th	
1943–44	3	3ª	5th	First round
1944–45	3	3ª	5th	
1945–46	3	3ª	2nd	
1946–47	3	3ª	6th	
1947–48	3	3ª	2nd	Third round

Season	Tier	Division	Place	Copa del Rey
1948–49	3	3ª	2nd	Second round
1949–50	2	2ª	5th	First round
1950–51	2	2ª	10th	
1951–52	2	2ª	10th	
1952–53	2	2ª	12th	First round
1953–54	2	2ª	14th	
1954–55	3	3ª	2nd	
1955–56	3	3ª	9th	
1956–57	3	3ª	2nd	
1957–58	3	3ª	5th	
1958–59	3	3ª	12th	
1959–60	3	3ª	2nd	
1960–61	3	3ª	7th	
1961–62	3	3ª	1st	
1962–63	3	3ª	9th	
1963–64	3	3ª	2nd	
1964–65	3	3ª	1st	
1965–66	3	3ª	1st	
1966–67	2	2ª	10th	Round of 32
1967–68	2	2ª	16th	Round of 32

Season	Tier	Division	Place	Copa del Rey
1968–69	3	3ª	8th	
1969–70	3	3ª	4th	Third round
1970–71	3	3ª	12th	Second round
1971–72	3	3ª	6th	Second round
1972–73	3	3ª	7th	First round
1973–74	3	3ª	5th	First round
1974–75	3	3ª	12th	Third round
1975–76	3	3ª	10th	Third round
1976–77	3	3ª	16th	First round
1977–78	4	3ª	19th	Second round
1978–79	5	Reg. Pref.	1st	
1979–80	4	3ª	20th	Second round
1980–81	5	Reg. Pref.	1st	
1981–82	4	3ª	14th	
1982–83	4	3ª	5th	
1983–84	4	3ª	6th	First round
1984–85	4	3ª	6th	First round
1985–86	4	3ª	8th	First round
1986–87	4	3ª	2nd	
1987–88	3	2ª B	20th	Third round

Season	Tier	Division	Place	Copa del Rey
1988–89	4	3ª	4th	Second round
1989–90	4	3ª	1st	
1990–91	3	2ª B	12th	Third round
1991–92	3	2ª B	7th	Third round
1992–93	3	2ª B	3rd	Third round
1993–94	3	2ª B	11th	Third round
1994–95	3	2ª B	17th	First round
1995–96	4	3ª	1st	
1996–97	3	2ª B	10th	First round
1997–98	3	2ª B	7th	
1998–99	3	2ª B	8th	
1999–2000	3	2ª B	1st	
2000–01	3	2ª B	13th	Round of 16
2001–02	3	2ª B	16th	
2002–03	3	2ª B	6th	
2003–04	3	2ª B	8th	Round of 32
2004–05	3	2ª B	19th	
2005–06	4	3ª	1st	
2006–07	3	2ª B	17th	First round
2007–08	4	3ª	1st	

Season	Tier	Division	Place	Copa del Rey
2008–09	4	3ª	1st	First round
2009–10	3	2ª B	9th	First round
2010–11	3	2ª B	9th	
2011–12	3	2ª B	15th	
2012–13	3	2ª B	13th	
2013–14	4	3ª	1st	
2014–15	4	3ª	2nd	First round
2015–16	4	3ª	2nd	
2016–17	4	3ª	1st	
2017–18	4	3ª	1st	First round
2018–19	3	2ª B	19th	First round
2019–20	4	3ª	2nd	
2020–21	4	3ª	2nd / 5th	First round
2021–22	5	3ª RFEF	1st	
2022–23	4	2ª Fed.	8th	First round
2023–24	4	2ª Fed.	12th	
2024–25	4	2ª Fed.	16th	
2025–26	5	3ª Fed.	1st	
2026-27	4	2ª Fed.		TBD

- 8 seasons in Segunda División
- 21 seasons in Segunda División B
- 4 seasons in Segunda Federación
- 52 seasons in Tercera División
- 2 seasons in Tercera Federación/Tercera División RFEF

== Current squad ==
As of 2 February 2024

Note: Flags indicate national team as defined under FIFA eligibility rules; some limited exceptions apply. Players may hold more than one non-FIFA nationality.

No.	Pos.	Nation	Player
1	GK	ESP	Jorge Mediavilla
2	DF	ESP	Álex Rasines
3	DF	ESP	Varo Álvarez
4	DF	ESP	Miguel Goñi
5	DF	ESP	Raúl Chamorro
6	MF	ESP	Alberto Gómez
7	FW	ESP	Unai Hernández
8	MF	ESP	Josemi Castañeda
9	FW	ESP	Carlos Tobar
10	MF	ESP	Álex Basurto
11	FW	ESP	Saúl García

No.	Pos.	Nation	Player
12	MF	ESP	Ernesten Lavsamba
13	GK	ESP	Dani Sotres
14	DF	ESP	Miguel Gándara
15	MF	ESP	Chus Ruiz
16	DF	ESP	Pol Bassa (on loan from Ponferradina)
17	FW	ESP	Javi Delgado
18	MF	ESP	Marcos Fernández
19	MF	ESP	Miguel Gómez
20	MF	ESP	Edu Bedia
21	DF	ESP	Alberto Delgado
—	DF	ESP	Chus Puras
