= Real Sociedad Atlética Stadium =

Football club in Spain active between 1919 and 1925

- The club's symbol
- Short name: Tomates
- Founded: 1919
- Dissolved: 28 June 1925
- Ground: Campo del Arrabal
- League: Aragón championship
Home colours

The Real Sociedad Atlética Stadium was a football team based in Zaragoza, Spain, which existed from 1919 until its dissolution in 1925. Initially founded as Sociedad Atlética Stadium, the King Alfonso XIII later granted them the title of Real ("Royal") in 1922.

Despite its ephemeral life, Atlética was one of the most important clubs in the history of Aragone football, being one of the four clubs that founded the Aragonese Football Federation in 1922, winning two Aragón Regional Championship in 1924 and 1925, and being the first Aragonese team to compete in the Copa del Rey in 1924.

In 1925, the club merged with the Zaragoza FC to form Zaragoza CD, which later merged with Iberia to give rise to the current Real Zaragoza.

== History ==
The Sociedad Atlética Stadium was founded in March 1919, becoming quickly known as the Tomates due to the striking red colour of the club's colours. It was founded by a group of the local high society educated at the Colegio de los Corazonistas, with Fermín Asirón at the head, being supported by wealthy people, most notably Count Sobradiel, who acted as a player and manager, and who had been one of the first promoters of this sport in the city. Initially, the club played at Campo del Paseo de la Mina.

On 19 April 1922, thanks to the influence of Count of Someruelos, the club was granted the title of Real ("Royal") by King Alfonso XIII, thus being then renamed as Real Sociedad Atlética Stadium (RSAS). In that same year, RSAS built the first proper football stadium in Zaragoza, the so-called Campo del Arrabal, which was "the first closed field of regulatory dimensions, with a wooden stand and terraced stands, and even nets in the goals", reaching a maximum capacity of 8,000 spectators in 1925, being not only the stadium with the largest capacity of fans in its region, but also the first pitch with FIFA dimensions in Aragón. This field was inaugurated on 12 March with a match between RSAS and Iberia, which marked the first time advance tickets were sold for a football match in Aragon; RSAS won 2–1. In September 1922, RSAS was one of the four clubs that founded the Aragonese Football Federation.

Two years later, RSAS won the 1923–24 Aragon Championship, which qualified the club to the 1924 Copa del Rey, thus becoming the first-ever Aragonese team to compete in the Copa del Rey, where they faced FC Barcelona, losing 8–1 away and 9–0 at home. On 20 April 1924, RSAS faced SD Turiaso, which was the first team of that city, at their newly established field Campo de Puentecristo. In the following season, RSAS won the Aragon Championship again, and this time they were drawn into Group I with Barça and Valencia, losing all four matches, although one of them was just by 0–1 to Valencia at home.

A few months later, in June 1925, RSAS merged with the Zaragoza FC to form Zaragoza CD, which later merged with Iberia to give rise to the current Real Zaragoza.

== Honours ==
- Aragón championship
  - Champion (2): 1923–24, 1924–25

== See also ==
- Zaragoza CD
- Real Zaragoza
