= 1929 Segunda División =

1st season of the second-tier football league in Spain

Segunda División
- Season: 1929
- Champions: Sevilla FC
- Relegated: Celta de Vigo; Racing de Madrid
- Matches: 90
- Goals: 335 (3.72 per match)

The 1929 Segunda División Grupo A season saw 10 teams participate in the second flight Spanish league. There was no team promoted to Primera División. Celta and Racing de Madrid were relegated to Tercera División.

== Stadia and locations ==
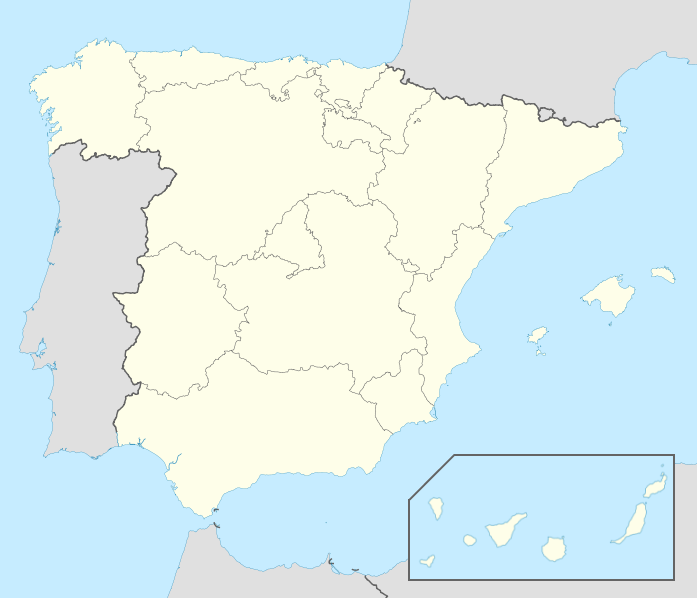

Team	Home city	Stadium	Capacity
Sevilla Football Club	Sevilla	Nervión	12,000
Iberia Sport Club	Zaragoza	Campo de Torrero	8,000
Club Deportivo Alavés	Vitoria	Mendizorroza	-
Real Sporting de Gijón	Gijón	Estadio El Molinón	6,000
Valencia Football Club	Valencia	Mestalla	25,000
Real Betis Balompié	Sevilla	Campo del Patronato Obrero	9,000
Real Oviedo Football Club	Oviedo	Teatinos	-
Real Club Deportivo de La Coruña	A Coruña	Riazor	-
Real Club Celta	Vigo	Balaídos	-
Racing Club de Madrid	Madrid	Paseo del General Martínez Campos	-

== League table ==
Pos	Team	Pld	W	D	L	GF	GA	GD	Pts	Promotion or relegation
1	Sevilla FC	18	8	6	4	35	24	+11	22	Promotion playoff
2	Iberia SC	18	9	4	5	33	27	+6	22	
3	Deportivo Alavés	18	8	5	5	28	20	+8	21	
4	R. Sporting de Gijón	18	7	5	6	41	35	+6	19	
5	Valencia FC	18	8	3	7	33	31	+2	19	
6	Real Betis	18	7	4	7	35	36	−1	18	
7	Real Oviedo FC	18	7	3	8	43	39	+4	17	
8	Deportivo de La Coruña	18	6	4	8	27	37	−10	16	
9	RC Celta	18	4	5	9	29	38	−9	13	Relegated to Tercera División
10	Racing de Madrid	18	6	1	11	31	48	−17	13	Relegated to Tercera División

Source: RSSSF

== Results ==
Home \ Away	ALA	BET	CEL	DEP	IBE	OVI	RAC	SEV	SPO	VAL
Deportivo Alavés		1–1	1–1	3–1	1–1	3–1	1–0	1–1	6–0	1–0
Betis Balompié	3–2		3–1	8–0	1–1	3–2	1–4	2–1	3–1	1–1
Celta de Vigo	0–1	3–1		1–1	1–2	3–3	6–0	3–2	1–1	2–1
Deportivo de La Coruña	0–1	0–0	4–2		3–0	1–1	5–2	2–2	1–0	2–0
Iberia SC	1–2	3–2	1–0	2–1		2–0	3–2	1–0	3–3	3–1
Real Oviedo	2–1	3–1	5–0	3–1	2–1		4–2	2–2	6–2	1–2
Racing de Madrid	3–2	1–2	2–1	1–4	0–4	3–2		1–1	4–0	4–3
Sevilla FC	1–0	3–0	2–2	2–0	3–1	5–2	2–1		1–0	4–2
Sporting de Gijón	1–1	6–2	5–0	7–0	2–2	3–2	5–1	2–1		3–1
Valencia FC	3–0	3–1	3–2	2–1	3–2	4–2	2–0	2–2	0–0	

Source: RSSSF
Legend: Blue = home team win; Yellow = draw; Red = away team win.

== Promotion playoff ==
Team 1	Agg.	Team 2	1st leg	2nd leg
Sevilla	2–3	Racing Santander	2–1	0–2
