= Aragón Championship =

- Organising body: Aragonese Football Federation
- Founded: 1922
- First season: 1923
- Folded: 1942
- Country: Spain
- Feeder to: Copa del Rey
- Last champions: Real Zaragoza (6th title)
- Most championships: Iberia SC (7 titles)

The Aragón Regional Championship was the top football competition in Aragón during the early years of the sport in the region, being unofficially organized as Campeonato de Aragón by Iberia SC from 1917 to 1922, and then officially as Campeonato Regional de Aragón by the Aragonese Football Federation from 1922 to 1940.

Between 1931 and 1936, the Aragón championship was held jointly with other regional Championships, such as Centro, Gipuzkoa, Navarre, and Castile and León.

== History ==
=== Background ===
Football began taking root in the region around 1903, and, like most football societies of the time, it had prominent British components. Unlike other areas where new clubs were gradually germinating, the practice of football in Aragon was trimmed down to just collegiate activity and the increasingly sporadic matches in Zaragoza. The first important club did not emerge there until 1910, with the foundation of Zaragoza Foot-ball Club, which wore a white shirt and black pants, mainly established with students from the Zaragoza university exclusively attended by students from Aragonese, Biscay, La Rioja, and Navarre. This new entity, however, ended up disappearing after just a handful of meetings with the main representatives of Huelva and Pamplona.

It was university football that allowed this sport to advance very slowly, shaping innumerous ephemeral societies that disappeared almost instantly when their members finished their respective academic careers. When the First World War broke out, Spain, as a neutral territory with little openness to the continent, became a port for many soldiers, especially Germans returning from African campaigns, giving a great boost to the implementation of football in the region. At the beginning of 1917, the Abinzano brothers, Jesús and Julio, recently arrived from Argentina, contacted José María Gayarre to establish a new club taking advantage of their extensive contacts with the Colegio de El Salvador, governed by the Jesuits. Gayarre, enthusiastic about the idea, gave them the uniforms that he still had from Sociedad Gimnástica Zaragozana, his previous endeavor in pioneering football, and thus, on one of the benches in the popular Plaza del Pilar, on Saturday, 24 March, the Iberia Sport Club was formed, chaired by Ricardo Ostalé.

=== Origins ===
Since its founding, Iberia, known as "the Wasps" due to their black-and-white uniform, was the great engine and lighthouse of football in Aragon, leading the handful of existing clubs in the region to unofficially organize what was the first attempt at a regional tournament. Iberia became its perpetual champion, becoming the Aragón Champion of the unofficial championships in 1917, 1918, 1919, 1920, and 1921. However, a federation was necessary to aspire to greater tasks, and thus, Iberia's leaders, especially José María Gayarre and José María Muniesa, gave legal support to all regional football, with the foundation of the Aragonese Football Federation on 13 September 1922, of which they were its first and second president, and hence making Iberia's voice heard throughout Spain. Two weeks later, on 28 September, the assembly met to draft the regulations and statutes of the federation, being definitively constituted on 1 October at the request of the national assembly.

Iberia then won the first official title after the creation of the regional Federation in 1923, following it up with six more titles in 1926, 1927, 1928, 1929, 1930, and 1931, thus participating in those six Copa del Rey editions, going no further than the round of 32 in each of the latter three occasions. However, it was Real Sociedad Atlética Stadium, the winners of the 1924 and 1925 editions, who became the first club from Aragón to play in the Copa del Rey in 1924, two decades after the competition's foundation, losing at the first opportunity to FC Barcelona by a resounding, which shows the abyss between Aragonese football and that of the rest of the country at the time.

In 1931, clubs from Aragón were added to the Gipuzkoa Championship and the name changed to the 'Gipuzkoa-Navarre-Aragón Combined Championship'; however, the Gipuzkoan teams remained dominant. In the 1934–35 seasons, the teams of Gipuzkoa and Navarre were integrated into the Basque Cup, while CD Logroño and the Aragón teams were integrated into a new 'Cantabria-Castile-Aragón Cup'. These tournaments were played for two years, until being interrupted by the outbreak of the Spanish Civil War. Like the others regional competitions, it held its final season in 1939–40 due to the suppression of all national regional championships following the consolidation of the national league and its lower divisions.

== Results ==
=== First unofficial championships ===
Season	Champion	Runner-up	Other participants
1917–18	Iberia SC	No data	No data
1918–19	Iberia SC	Real Sociedad Atlética Stadium	CD Fuenclara
1919–20	Iberia SC	CD Fuenclara	Real Sociedad Atlética Stadium / es:Deportiva Universitaria
1920–21	Iberia SC	No data	No data
1921–22	Unión Deportiva	Iberia SC	Real Sociedad Atlética Stadium

=== Official championships ===
==== First official stage ====
Season	Championship	Champion	Runner-up	Thirds	Other participants
1922–23	First Category - Serie A	Iberia SC	R. S. A. Stadium	-	No data
1923–24	First Category - Serie A	R. S. A. Stadium	SD Universitaria	-	Iberia SC / CD Fuenclara
1924–25	First Category - Serie A	R. S. A. Stadium	Iberia SC	Zaragoza FC	Huesca CF
1925–26	First Category - Serie A	Iberia SC	Zaragoza CD	-	Huesca CF / CD Patria Aragón
1926–27	First Category - Serie A	Iberia SC	Zaragoza CD	-	CD Patria Aragón / Huesca CF
1927–28	First Category - Serie A	Iberia SC	CD Patria Aragón	Zaragoza CD	Huesca CF
1928–29	First Category - Serie A	Iberia SC	CD Patria Aragón	-	Zaragoza CD
1929–30	First Category - Serie A	Iberia SC	CD Patria Aragón	-	Zaragoza CD / CD Juventud
1930–31	First Category - Serie A	Iberia SC	CD Patria Aragón	Zaragoza CD	No

==== Integration into Joint and other regional Championships ====
Season	Championship Name	Champion
1931–32	1931 Mancomunado Guipúzcoa-Navarra-Aragón	Zaragoza CD
1931–32	Campeonato Regional Centro	Iberia SC
1932–33	Campeonato Mancomunado Guipúzcoa-Navarra-Aragón	Zaragoza FC
1933–34	Campeonato Mancomunado Guipúzcoa-Navarra-Aragón	Zaragoza FC
1934–35	Campeonato Mancomunado Castilla-Aragón	Zaragoza FC
1935–36	Campeonato Mancomunado Castilla-Aragón	Zaragoza FC

==== Aragón Championship during the Civil War ====
During the years 1937 and 1938, the joint and regional championships were not held in these areas due to the Spanish Civil War. In 1939, a precarious Aragon Championship was organized in the national zone with groups of military teams, including the Club Aviación Nacional, who merged shortly after with Atlético Madrid to give rise to Atlético Aviación, with the exception of the Real Zaragoza and the Huelva Sports Club, civil groups.

Temporada	Campeonato	Campeón	Subcampeón	Otros participantes
1938–39	Campeonato Regional de Aragón	Aviación Nacional	Zaragoza FC	CD Huesca / División 105 / 80 Compañía / Recuperación

==== New integration in Mancomunados ====
Temporada	Campeonato	Participantes aragoneses
1939–40	Campeonato Mancomunado Guipúzcoa-Navarra-Aragón	Zaragoza FC

=== Latest unofficial championships ===
In recent editions, only different categories of amateur teams were competed, in which the champion of the first category was no longer eligible to qualify for the Spanish Cup. Starting in 1940, the dissolutions of the regional championships began throughout Spain to make room for the lower divisions in a process of restructuring the football championships at the national level.

Season	Championship	Champion	Runner-up	Other participants
1940–41	First Category (amateurs)	CD Discóbolo	Arenas SD	No data
1941–42	First Category (amateurs)	Atlético Zaragoza	SD Carde Escoriaza	No data

== Performances ==
=== Official championships ===
- Iberia Sport Club (7): 1923, 1926, 1927, 1928, 1929, 1930, 1931
- Real Sociedad Atlética Stadium (2): 1924, 1925
- Aviación Nacional (1): 1939

=== Unofficial championships ===
First stage:

- Iberia Sport Club (5) 1917, 1918, 1919, 1920, 1921
- Unión Deportiva (1): 1922

Last stage:

- CD Discóbolo (1): 1941
- Atlético Zaragoza (1): 1942

== See also ==
- Aragon official football team
- Real Zaragoza
