= Estadio El Malecón =

Soccer stadium in Torrelavega, Spain

Coordinates: 43°21′02″N 4°03′50″W

Campos del Malecón
- Interactive map of Campos del Malecón
- Location: Torrelavega, Spain
- Owner: Torrelavega City Hall
- Capacity: 6,007
- Surface: Grass

Construction
- Opened: 1922
- Renovated: 2011–2012

Tenant
- Gimnástica de Torrelavega

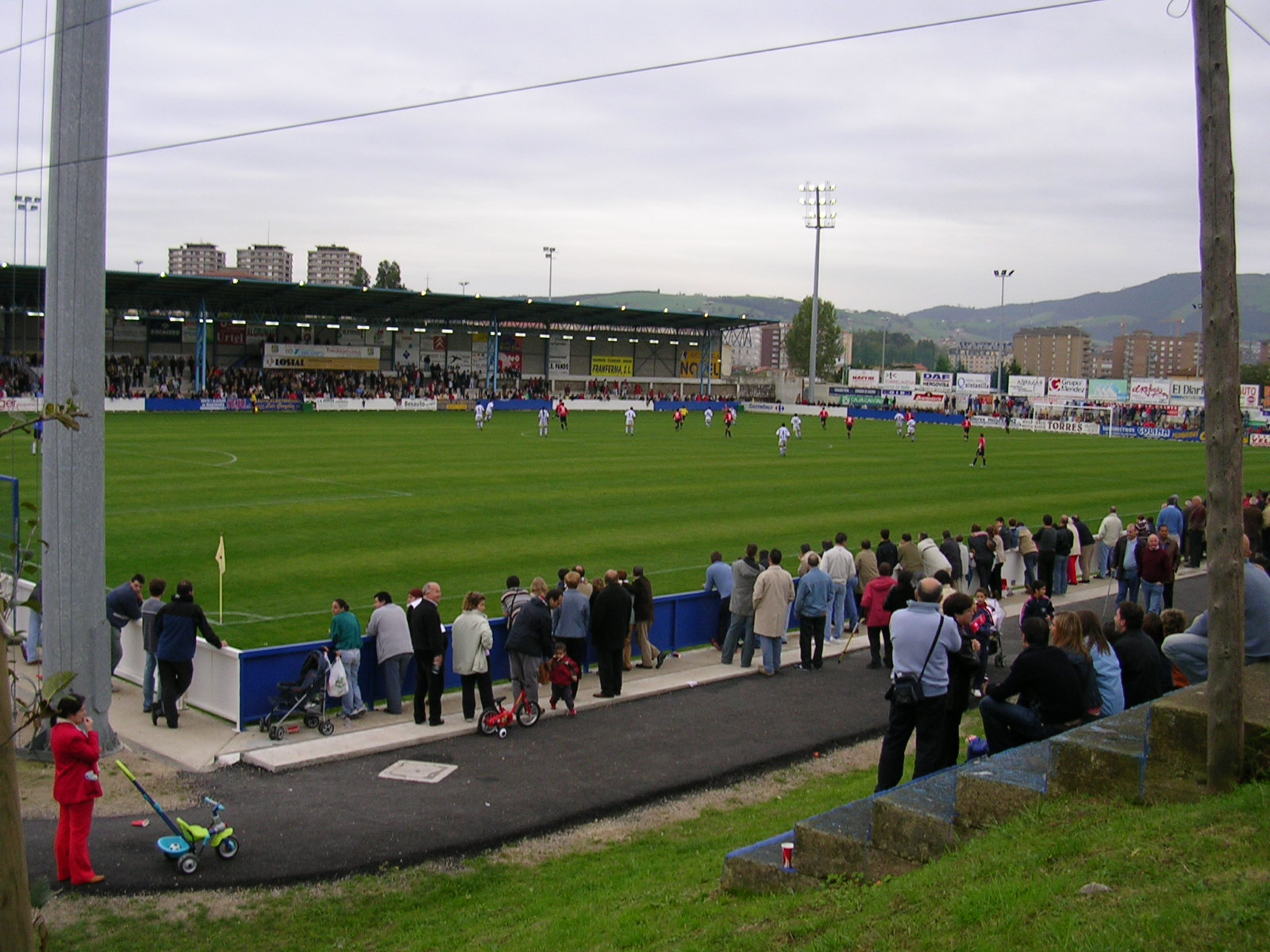
In 2004, before its renovation.

Campos del Malecón, also known as simply El Malecón or Estadio El Malecón, is a stadium in Torrelavega, Spain. It is currently used for football matches and is the home stadium of Gimnástica de Torrelavega. The stadium holds 6,007 spectators and was extensively refurbished in 2011. The ground reopened on 22 January 2012 when Gimnástica played CD Guijuelo. It also hosted the rugby union test match between Spain and Chile on 21 November 2015.
