= Cartagena CF =

Spanish football club

Cartagena
- Full name: Cartagena Club de Fútbol
- Founded: 1919
- Dissolved: 1952
- Ground: El Almarjal
- Capacity: 12,000
- Chairman: N/A
- Manager: N/A
- 1951–52: 2ªA Group 2, 16th
Home colours	Away colours

Cartagena Club de Fútbol was a football club based in Cartagena, Region of Murcia. The club played 7 seasons in Segunda División. Cartagena CF disappeared at the end of the 1951–52 season for not paying its players.

Immediately after Cartagena CF's disappearance, another club in Cartagena was founded, UD Cartagenera, that was playing in Tercera Federación as of 2022, when its senior side was disbanded, only keeping its youth football sides. This club was also succeeded, by FC Cartagena, that currently competes in Segunda División.

== Honours ==
- Tercera División
  - Winners (2): 1929–30, 1932–33
  - Runners-up (2): 1931–32, 1947–48
- Divisiones Regionales
  - Winners (2): 1934–35, 1935–36

== Season to season ==
Season	Tier	Division	Place	Copa del Rey
1929	3	3ª	10th	
1929–30	3	3ª	1st	
1930–31	3	3ª	3rd	
1931–32	3	3ª	2nd	
1932–33	3	3ª	1st	
1933–34	3	3ª	6th	
1934–35	4	1ª Reg.	4th	
1935–36	5	2ª Reg.	1st	
1936–37	4	1ª Reg.	6th	
1939–40	2	2ª	5th	
1940–41	2	2ª	10th	

Season	Tier	Division	Place	Copa del Rey
1941–42	2	2ª	8th	
1942–43	DNP			
1943–44	3	3ª	5th	
1944–45	3	3ª	7th	
1945–46	3	3ª	4th	
1946–47	3	3ª	3rd	
1947–48	3	3ª	2nd	
1948–49	3	3ª	3rd	
1949–50	2	2ª	15th	
1950–51	2	2ª	11th	
1951–52	2	2ª	16th	

- 6 seasons in Segunda División
- 12 seasons in Tercera División

== Famous players ==
- (Spain) Cabillo
- (Spain) Diego Lucas
