= Real Murcia CF =

Spanish football club

Real Murcia
- Full name: Real Murcia Club de Fútbol, S.A.D.
- Nickname: Pimentoneros
- Founded: 6 December 1919; 106 years ago
- Stadium: Nueva Condomina
- Capacity: 31,179
- President: Felipe Moreno Romero
- Head coach: Sergi Guilló
- League: Primera Federación – Group 2
- 2025–26: Primera Federación – Group 2, 10th of 20
- Website: www.realmurcia.es
Home colours	Away colours

Real Murcia Club de Fútbol, S.A.D., commonly known as Real Murcia ([reˈal ˈmuɾθja], "Royal Murcia"), is a Spanish football club based in Murcia, in the Región de Murcia. Founded in 1919, it currently plays in Primera Federación – Group 2, playing home matches at Estadio Nueva Condomina, which holds 31,179 spectators.

In domestic football, the club has won a record 8 Segunda División titles and 1 Spanish Royal Federation Cup.

Home colours are mainly scarlet shirt and white shorts.

== History ==
Officially founded in 1919 as Levante Foot-ball Club (records show earlier denominations, such as 1903's Foot Ball Club de Murcia and 1906's Murcia Football Club), Real Murcia was named as such, in 1923–24, by King Alfonso XIII. The following year, the La Condomina stadium was opened, with the club holding home games there for the next 82 years uninterrupted.

In 1929 the club first competed in the Tercera División (third tier), achieving its first ever promotion to La Liga in 1939–40. The highest position of 11th was reached in 1945, 1946, 1984 and 1987.

Murcia holds the record for the most Segunda División titles with eight, most recently in 2002–03 under manager David Vidal. In that season, the team also equalled its best run in the Copa del Rey by reaching the quarter-finals before losing on the away goals rule to Deportivo de La Coruña, despite a 4–3 win in the second leg at home.

Following an immediate descent back to Segunda in last place, the team won promotion to the top flight for the last time under Lucas Alcaraz in 2007, again lasting only one year. In June 2010, the team fell into Segunda División B for the first time in a decade with a 1–1 draw at Girona FC on the final day, with goalkeeper Alberto Cifuentes saving a penalty kick from Kiko Ratón in added time before it deflected in off himself.

Murcia returned immediately to the second tier, winning the 2010–11 Segunda División B title with a penalty shootout win over CE Sabadell FC in June after a 1–1 aggregate draw. In 2014, the team finished fourth and was top seeded for the playoffs, losing 2–1 on aggregate to eventual winners Córdoba CF; weeks later Murcia were relegated for non-compliance with Liga de Fútbol Profesional regulations.

In 2019, Murcia won the Spanish Royal Federation Cup for the first time with a penalty shootout victory over CD Tudelano.

== Season to season ==
=== Murcia Regional Championship ===
Season	Tier	Place	Copa del Rey
1925–26	—	—	Group stage
1926–27	—	—	Group stage
1927–28	—	—	Quarter-finals

=== Spanish football league ===
Season	Tier	Division	Place	Copa del Rey
1929	3	3ª	2nd	Round of 32
1929–30	2	2ª	8th	Round of 16
1930–31	2	2ª	7th	Round of 16
1931–32	2	2ª	5th	Round of 32
1932–33	2	2ª	3rd	Quarter-finals
1933–34	2	2ª	3rd	Round of 16
1934–35	2	2ª	2nd	Third round
1935–36	2	2ª	1st	Round of 16
1939–40	2	2ª	1st	First round
1940–41	1	1ª	12th	Round of 16
1941–42	2	2ª	2nd	Round of 16
1942–43	2	2ª	3rd	DNP
1943–44	2	2ª	2nd	Semi-finals
1944–45	1	1ª	11th	First round
1945–46	1	1ª	11th	Round of 16
1946–47	1	1ª	12th	First round
1947–48	2	2ª	11th	Quarter-finals
1948–49	2	2ª	7th	Fourth round
1949–50	2	2ª	2nd	Second round
1950–51	1	1ª	14th	DNP

Season	Tier	Division	Place	Copa del Rey
1951–52	2	2ª	5th	DNP
1952–53	2	2ª	11th	Round of 16
1953–54	2	2ª	12th	DNP
1954–55	2	2ª	1st	Round of 16
1955–56	1	1ª	13th	DNP
1956–57	2	2ª	3rd	DNP
1957–58	2	2ª	3rd	DNP
1958–59	2	2ª	6th	Round of 32
1959–60	2	2ª	7th	Round of 32
1960–61	2	2ª	8th	Round of 32
1961–62	2	2ª	8th	Round of 32
1962–63	2	2ª	1st	Round of 32
1963–64	1	1ª	12th	Round of 32
1964–65	1	1ª	13th	Round of 16
1965–66	2	2ª	10th	First round
1966–67	2	2ª	7th	First round
1967–68	2	2ª	6th	First round
1968–69	2	2ª	8th	DNP
1969–70	2	2ª	18th	Quarter-finals
1970–71	3	3ª	9th	Third round

Season	Tier	Division	Place	Copa del Rey
1971–72	3	3ª	1st	First round
1972–73	2	2ª	1st	Third round
1973–74	1	1ª	15th	Round of 16
1974–75	1	1ª	18th	Fourth round
1975–76	2	2ª	17th	Third round
1976–77	3	3ª	1st	Second round
1977–78	2	2ª	5th	Fourth round
1978–79	2	2ª	14th	Round of 16
1979–80	2	2ª	1st	Fourth round
1980–81	1	1ª	16th	Second round
1981–82	2	2ª	5th	Third round
1982–83	2	2ª	1st	Third round
1983–84	1	1ª	11th	Third round
1984–85	1	1ª	18th	Third round
1985–86	2	2ª	1st	Third round
1986–87	1	1ª	11th	Second round
1987–88	1	1ª	17th	Round of 32
1988–89	1	1ª	19th	Round of 32
1989–90	2	2ª	9th	First round
1990–91	2	2ª	3rd	Fifth round

Season	Tier	Division	Place	Copa del Rey
1991–92	2	2ª	11th	Round of 16
1992–93	3	2ª B	1st	Third round
1993–94	2	2ª	18th	Fourth round
1994–95	3	2ª B	17th	Third round
1995–96	4	3ª	1st	
1996–97	3	2ª B	13th	First round
1997–98	3	2ª B	8th	
1998–99	3	2ª B	4th	
1999–2000	3	2ª B	2nd	Preliminary round
2000–01	2	2ª	13th	Round of 16
2001–02	2	2ª	15th	Round of 64
2002–03	2	2ª	1st	Quarter-finals
2003–04	1	1ª	20th	Round of 32
2004–05	2	2ª	12th	Round of 64
2005–06	2	2ª	16th	Second round
2006–07	2	2ª	3rd	Second round
2007–08	1	1ª	19th	Round of 32
2008–09	2	2ª	14th	Round of 32
2009–10	2	2ª	20th	Round of 32
2010–11	3	2ª B	1st	Round of 32

Season	Tier	Division	Place	Copa del Rey
2011–12	2	2ª	18th	Second round
2012–13	2	2ª	19th	Second round
2013–14	2	2ª	4th	Second round
2014–15	3	2ª B	2nd	Second round
2015–16	3	2ª B	2nd	First round
2016–17	3	2ª B	2nd	First round
2017–18	3	2ª B	3rd	Round of 32
2018–19	3	2ª B	11th	Second round
2019–20	3	2ª B	8th	Second round
2020–21	3	2ª B	6th / 4th	
2021–22	4	2ª RFEF	3rd	
2022–23	3	1ª Fed.	6th	First round
2023–24	3	1ª Fed.	7th	First round
2024–25	3	1ª Fed.	2nd	
2025–26	3	1ª Fed.	10th	Round of 32
2026–27	3	1ª Fed.		

- 18 seasons in Primera División
- 53 seasons in Segunda División
- 5 seasons in Primera Federación
- 14 seasons in Segunda División B
- 1 season in Segunda División RFEF
- 5 seasons in Tercera División

== Current squad ==
As of 4 November 2026

Note: Flags indicate national team as defined under FIFA eligibility rules; some limited exceptions apply. Players may hold more than one non-FIFA nationality.

No.	Pos.	Nation	Player
1	GK	ESP	Diego Piñeiro
2	DF	ESP	Jorge Mier
3	DF	ESP	Cristo Romero
4	DF	ESP	Héctor Pérez
5	DF	ESP	Joan Rojas
6	DF	ESP	Alberto González
7	MF	ESP	Sergio Moyita
8	MF	ESP	Javi Mier
9	FW	ESP	Juanto Ortuño
10	MF	ESP	Chema
11	FW	ESP	Álvaro Bustos
13	GK	ESP	Dani Jiménez
14	MF	BRA	João Pedro Palmberg

No.	Pos.	Nation	Player
15	DF	ESP	Óscar Gil
17	FW	ESP	Javi Moreno
18	FW	SEN	Usseyn Diao
19	FW	ESP	Joel Jorquera
20	FW	ESP	Álvaro Giménez
21	DF	MAR	Mounir Errahaly
22	DF	ESP	Víctor Olmedo
23	FW	SLO	David Flakus Bosilj
24	DF	ESP	Jorge Sánchez
27	MF	ESP	Alonso Yoldi
33	FW	ESP	Pablo Reyes
40	FW	ESP	Álex Meca

=== Reserve team ===
Note: Flags indicate national team as defined under FIFA eligibility rules; some limited exceptions apply. Players may hold more than one non-FIFA nationality.

No.	Pos.	Nation	Player
26	DF	ESP	Eloy Giménez
28	FW	ESP	Raúl Rubira
29	MF	ESP	Carlos Torres
32	MF	ESP	Samu Guzmán

No.	Pos.	Nation	Player
34	DF	ESP	Marcos García
35	FW	GHA	Divine Yeboah
36	GK	ESP	Manu García

== Players with the most appearances ==
Name	Position	Nationality	Real Murcia career*	Total appearances
José Acciari	Defensive midfield	Argentina Italy	2001-2007, 2012-2015	265
Richi	Central midfield	Spain	2002-2008, 2010-2012	261
Armando Ortiz	Central midfield	Spain	2014-2020, 2021-2023	255
Ibán Cuadrado	Centre back	Spain	2001-2008	226
Juanma	Right back	Spain	1996-2007	198
Pedro León	Right wing	Spain	2004-2007, 2022-2026	188
Alberto González	Centre back	Spain	2021-	172
Iván Alonso	Centre forward	Uruguay Spain	2004-2009	156
Manuel Núñez	Right back	Spain	1983-1988, 1990-1991	131
Miguel Albiol	Right midfield	Spain	2003, 2009-2016	131

- includes youth teams

== Honours ==
=== League ===
- Segunda División
  - Winners (8) – record: 1939–40, 1954–55, 1962–63, 1972–73, 1979–80, 1982–83, 1985–86, 2002–03
- Segunda División B
  - Winners (1): 2010–11
- Tercera División
  - Winners (3): 1971–72, 1976–77, 1995–96

=== Cups ===
- Copa Federación de España
  - Winners (1): 2019

== See also ==
- Real Murcia Imperial – Murcia's reserve team
