= 1929–30 Tercera División =

Tercera División
- Season: 1929–30
- Promoted: Castellón
- Biggest home win: Racing de Ferrol 8–0 Emden; Atlético Aurora 8-0 Esperanza
- Biggest away win: Unión Madrid 0–6 Patria Aragón
- Highest scoring: Racing de Ferrol 8–0 Emden; Atlético Aurora 8-0 Esperanza

The 1929–30 Tercera División season was the second season since its establishment.

== Group 1 ==
=== Group 1–A ===
==== League table ====
Pos	Team	Pld	W	D	L	GF	GA	GD	Pts	Qualification or relegation
1	Racing Ferrol	4	4	0	0	13	1	+12	8	Qualification for the group finals
2	Emden	4	1	1	2	3	11	−8	3	
3	Eiriña	4	0	1	3	3	7	−4	1	
4	Unión (Note: Retired of the competition)	0	0	0	0	0	0	0	0	Retired

Source: AREFE
Rules for classification: 1) points; 2) head-to-head points; 3) head-to-head goal difference; 4) goal difference; 5) number of goals scored

=== Group 1–B ===
==== Play-off ====
Team 1	Agg.	Team 2	1st leg	2nd leg
Stadium Avilesino	4–4	Gijón	2–1	2–3

==== Tiebreaker ====
Team 1	Score	Team 2
Gijón	3–0	Stadium Avilesino

=== Group 1–Finals ===
==== Play-off ====
Team 1	Agg.	Team 2	1st leg	2nd leg
Gijón	4–3	Racing Ferrol	2–1	2–2

== Group 2 ==
=== League table ===
Pos	Team	Pld	W	D	L	GF	GA	GD	Pts	Qualification or relegation
1	Barakaldo	8	4	2	2	19	15	+4	10	Qualification for the promotion play-off
2	Valladolid	8	4	1	3	19	12	+7	9	
3	Logroño	8	3	2	3	14	13	+1	8	
4	Gimnástica Torrelavega	8	2	3	3	14	19	−5	7	
5	Sestao	8	2	2	4	14	21	−7	6	

Source: AREFE
Rules for classification: 1) points; 2) head-to-head points; 3) head-to-head goal difference; 4) goal difference; 5) number of goals scored

== Group 3 ==
=== Play-off ===
Team 1	Agg.	Team 2	1st leg	2nd leg
Esperanza	5–5	Atlético Aurora	3–2	2–3

=== Tiebreaker ===
Team 1	Score	Team 2
Atlético Aurora	8–0	Esperanza

== Group 4 ==
=== League table ===
Pos	Team	Pld	W	D	L	GF	GA	GD	Pts	Qualification or relegation
1	Patria Aragón	4	4	0	0	17	1	+16	8	Qualification for the promotion play-off
2	Nacional Madrid	4	2	0	2	7	7	0	4	
3	Unión Madrid	4	0	0	4	0	16	−16	0	

Source: AREFE
Rules for classification: 1) points; 2) head-to-head points; 3) head-to-head goal difference; 4) goal difference; 5) number of goals scored

== Group 5 ==
=== League table ===
Pos	Team	Pld	W	D	L	GF	GA	GD	Pts	Qualification or relegation
1	Castellón	6	3	1	2	14	10	+4	7	Qualification for the promotion play-off
2	Badalona	6	3	0	3	16	16	0	6 (Note: Badalona finished ahead of Sants on head-to-head points: Sants–Badalona 2–3, Badalona–Sants 5–1)	
3	Sants	6	3	0	3	10	12	−2	6	
4	Júpiter	6	2	1	3	11	13	−2	5	

Source: AREFE
Rules for classification: 1) points; 2) head-to-head points; 3) head-to-head goal difference; 4) goal difference; 5) number of goals scored

== Group 6 ==
=== League table ===
Pos	Team	Pld	W	D	L	GF	GA	GD	Pts	Qualification or relegation
1	Sporting Canet	8	4	4	0	22	5	+17	12	Qualification for the champions play-off
2	Levante	8	4	3	1	20	14	+6	11	
3	Gimnástico Valencia	8	2	3	3	11	13	−2	7	
4	Atlético Saguntino	8	2	2	4	12	20	−8	6	
5	Burjassot	8	1	2	5	10	23	−13	4	

Source: AREFE
Rules for classification: 1) points; 2) head-to-head points; 3) head-to-head goal difference; 4) goal difference; 5) number of goals scored

== Group 7 ==
=== League table ===
Pos	Team	Pld	W	D	L	GF	GA	GD	Pts	Qualification or relegation
1	Cartagena	10	7	2	1	26	8	+18	16	Qualification for the promotion play-off
2	Elche	10	6	2	2	19	12	+7	14	
3	Lorca	10	6	0	4	20	15	+5	12	
4	Albacete	10	4	1	5	14	15	−1	9	
5	Hércules	10	3	0	7	19	26	−7	6	
6	Imperial Murcia	10	1	1	8	9	31	−22	3	

Source: AREFE
Rules for classification: 1) points; 2) head-to-head points; 3) head-to-head goal difference; 4) goal difference; 5) number of goals scored

== Group 8 ==
=== League table ===
Pos	Team	Pld	W	D	L	GF	GA	GD	Pts	Qualification or relegation
1	Recreativo	4	3	0	1	16	8	+8	6 (Note: Recreativo finished ahead of Malagueño on head-to-head goal difference: Malagueño–Recreativo 4–2, Recreativo–Malagueño 4–0)	Qualification for the promotion play-off
2	Malagueño	4	3	0	1	8	6	+2	6	
3	Málaga	4	0	0	4	4	14	−10	0	
4	Don Benito (Note: Retired of the competition)	0	0	0	0	0	0	0	0	Retired

Source: AREFE
Rules for classification: 1) points; 2) head-to-head points; 3) head-to-head goal difference; 4) goal difference; 5) number of goals scored

== Promotion play-off ==
=== Bracket ===
Quarter-finals
Patria Aragón	6	0	6
Atlético Aurora	2	1	3
Barakaldo	3	1	4
Gijón	2	1	3
Recreativo	2	0	2
Cartagena	1	5	6
Sporting Canet	1	1	2
Castellón	2	3	5

Semi-finals
Patria Aragón	2	1	3
Barakaldo	2	4	6
Cartagena	3	0	3
Castellón	2	2	4

Final
Barakaldo	2
Castellón	3
