= Zaragoza CD =

- Full name: Zaragoza Club Deportivo
- Nickname: Tomates (Tomatoes)
- Founded: 1925
- Dissolved: 1932
- Ground: Campo de la Torre de Bruil, Zaragoza, Spain
Home colours

Real Zaragoza Club Deportivo and later simply Zaragoza Club Deportivo was a Spanish football club based in Zaragoza, founded in 1925 as result of the merger of Athletic Stadium (founded in 1919) and Zaragoza FC (founded in 1921). The club played its games at Campo de la Torre de Bruil, and in 1932 merged with Iberia SC to form the current Real Zaragoza.

== History ==
=== Background ===
Zaragoza FC - (1921–1924) → ↓

Zaragoza FC - (1924–1925)

CD Fuenclara - (1918–1924) → ↑

Zaragoza FC - (1924–1925) → ↓

Zaragoza CD - (1925–1932)

RSA Stadium - (1919–1924) → ↑

Iberia SC - (1916–1932) → ↓

Zaragoza FC - (1932–)

Zaragoza CD - (1925–1932) → ↑

== Seasons ==
Season	Tier	Division	Place	Copa del Rey
1925–26	—	1ª Reg.	2nd	Group stage
1926–27	—	1ª Reg.	2nd	Group stage
1927–28	—	1ª Reg.	3rd	
1928–29	3	3ª	5th	
1929–30	4	1ª Reg.	3rd	
1930–31	3	3ª	4th	
1931–32	4	1ª Reg.	(R)	

- 2 seasons in Tercera División
