= Estadio Torrero =

Stadium in Zaragoza, Spain

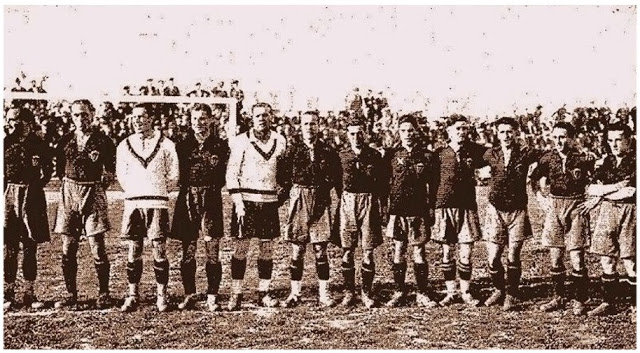
- Interactive map of Estadio Torrero
- Full name: Estadio Torrero
- Location: Zaragoza, Spain
- Coordinates: 41°37′48″N 0°52′57″W
- Owner: Real Zaragoza
- Operator: Real Zaragoza
- Capacity: 15,020

Construction
- Opened: October 7, 1923

Tenants
- Iberia SC (1923-1932); Real Zaragoza (1932-1957); Fénix Club de Rugby

Estadio Torrero was a multi-use stadium in Zaragoza, Spain. It was initially used as the stadium of Real Zaragoza matches until it was replaced by La Romareda in 1957. It held 15,020 spectators. It also hosted a match between the Spain national football team and the France national football team on April 14, 1929. Spain won 8–1.

Estadio Torrero hosted the 1927 Copa del Rey Final when Real Unión won 1–0 against Arenas Club de Getxo.
