= Asturias Championship =

Former football tournament in Spain

- Sport: Football
- Founded: 1916
- Folded: 1940
- Country: Asturias, Spain
- Last champions: Real Sporting de Gijón (13th title)
- Most titles: Real Sporting de Gijón (13 titles)

The Regional Championship of Asturias (Spanish: Campeonato Regional de Asturias) was a football tournament played in Spain, organized by the Asturian Federation. It was played annually between 1916 and 1940 by the clubs affiliated in this.

In the 1931–32 it was played together with the championship of Cantabria and in the 1935–36, with that of Galicia.

== List of winners ==
Season	Winner
1916–17	Real Sporting de Gijón
1917–18	Real Sporting de Gijón
1918–19	Real Sporting de Gijón
1919–20	Real Sporting de Gijón
1920–21	Real Sporting de Gijón
1921–22	Real Sporting de Gijón
1922–23	Real Sporting de Gijón
1923–24	Real Sporting de Gijón
1924–25	Real Stadium Club Ovetense
1925–26	Real Sporting de Gijón
1926–27	Real Sporting de Gijón
1927–28	Real Oviedo
1928–29	Real Oviedo
1929–30	Real Sporting de Gijón
1930–31	Real Sporting de Gijón
1931–32	Oviedo FC
1932–33	Oviedo FC
1933–34	Oviedo FC
1934–35	Oviedo FC
1935–36	Oviedo FC
1936–1939	Not played due to the Spanish Civil War.
1939–40	Real Sporting de Gijón

== Champions ==
Club	Champions
Real Sporting de Gijón	13
Real Oviedo	7
Real Stadium Club Ovetense	1

== Editions ==
=== 1918–19 ===
Pos	Team	Pld	W	D	L	GF	GA	GD	Pts
1	Sporting Gijón	2	2	0	0	14	0	+14	4
2	Racing Gijón	2	0	0	2	0	14	−14	0

Source: CIHEFE
Rules for classification: 1) Points; 2) Head-to-head; 3) Goal difference; 4) Number of goals scored

=== 1919–20 ===
Pos	Team	Pld	W	D	L	GF	GA	GD	Pts
1	Sporting Gijón	8	7	1	0	17	2	+15	15
2	Stadium Ovetense	8	5	0	3	12	4	+8	10
3	Racing Gijón	8	3	1	4	11	16	−5	7
4	RCD Oviedo	8	2	1	5	13	18	−5	5
5	Hispania Gijón	8	1	1	6	5	18	−13	3

Source: CIHEFE
Rules for classification: 1) Points; 2) Head-to-head; 3) Goal difference; 4) Number of goals scored

=== 1920–21 ===
Pos	Team	Pld	W	D	L	GF	GA	GD	Pts
1	Sporting Gijón	8	6	1	1	20	9	+11	13
2	Racing Gijón	8	3	2	3	18	18	0	8
3	Stadium Ovetense	7	3	2	2	14	12	+2	8
4	Hispania Gijón	8	2	2	4	8	18	−10	6
5	RCD Oviedo	7	0	3	4	9	12	−3	3

Source: CIHEFE
Rules for classification: 1) Points; 2) Head-to-head; 3) Goal difference; 4) Number of goals scored

=== 1921–22 ===
Pos	Team	Pld	W	D	L	GF	GA	GD	Pts
1	Sporting Gijón	10	10	0	0	49	4	+45	20
2	Racing Gijón	10	7	1	2	16	12	+4	15
3	Stadium Ovetense	10	5	1	4	20	17	+3	11
4	Stadium Avilesino	10	2	1	7	8	20	−12	5
5	RCD Oviedo	10	2	1	7	5	34	−29	5
6	Hispania Gijón	10	2	0	8	10	21	−11	4

Source: CIHEFE
Rules for classification: 1) Points; 2) Head-to-head; 3) Goal difference; 4) Number of goals scored

=== 1922–23 ===
Pos	Team	Pld	W	D	L	GF	GA	GD	Pts
1	Sporting Gijón	8	6	0	2	26	10	+16	12
2	Stadium Ovetense	8	6	0	2	15	8	+7	12
3	RCD Oviedo	8	5	0	3	16	13	+3	10
4	Racing Gijón	8	2	0	6	9	28	−19	4
5	Stadium Avilesino	8	1	0	7	9	16	−7	2

Source: CIHEFE
Rules for classification: 1) Points; 2) Head-to-head; 3) Goal difference; 4) Number of goals scored

=== 1923–24 ===
Pos	Team	Pld	W	D	L	GF	GA	GD	Pts
1	Sporting Gijón	10	8	0	2	28	13	+15	16
2	RCD Oviedo	10	6	2	2	20	9	+11	14
3	Racing Sama	10	5	2	3	16	14	+2	12
4	Stadium Ovetense	10	5	1	4	11	7	+4	11
5	Stadium Avilesino	10	1	3	6	6	17	−11	5
6	Racing Gijón	10	0	2	8	9	30	−21	2

Source: CIHEFE
Rules for classification: 1) Points; 2) Head-to-head; 3) Goal difference; 4) Number of goals scored

=== 1924–25 ===
Pos	Team	Pld	W	D	L	GF	GA	GD	Pts
1	Stadium Ovetense	10	8	1	1	22	3	+19	17
2	Sporting Gijón	10	6	1	3	20	12	+8	13
3	Stadium Avilesino	10	5	1	4	17	17	0	11
4	Racing Sama	10	5	1	4	13	15	−2	11
5	Racing Gijón	10	2	2	6	10	19	−9	6
6	RCD Oviedo	10	1	0	9	10	26	−16	2

Source: CIHEFE
Rules for classification: 1) Points; 2) Head-to-head; 3) Goal difference; 4) Number of goals scored

=== 1925–26 ===
Pos	Team	Pld	W	D	L	GF	GA	GD	Pts
1	Sporting Gijón	14	10	2	2	41	14	+27	22
2	Fortuna Gijonés	14	8	4	2	31	16	+15	20
3	Stadium Ovetense	14	8	2	4	29	18	+11	18
4	Racing Sama	14	7	3	4	30	20	+10	17
5	Racing Gijón	14	5	3	6	26	29	−3	13
6	Stadium Avilesino	14	3	2	9	25	48	−23	8
7	Athletic Gijonés	14	4	0	10	12	36	−24	8
8	RCD Oviedo	14	2	2	10	12	25	−13	6

Source: CIHEFE
Rules for classification: 1) Points; 2) Head-to-head; 3) Goal difference; 4) Number of goals scored

=== 1926–27 ===
Pos	Team	Pld	W	D	L	GF	GA	GD	Pts
1	Sporting Gijón	14	12	1	1	75	20	+55	25
2	Fortuna Gijonés	14	9	3	2	33	23	+10	21
3	Oviedo	14	9	2	3	56	18	+38	20
4	Racing Sama	14	6	1	7	37	32	+5	13
5	Stadium Avilesino	14	5	2	7	29	45	−16	12
6	Racing Gijón	14	4	2	8	17	45	−28	10
7	Cimadevilla	14	2	3	9	13	38	−25	7
8	Athletic Gijonés	14	1	2	11	12	51	−39	4

Source: CIHEFE
Rules for classification: 1) Points; 2) Head-to-head; 3) Goal difference; 4) Number of goals scored

=== 1927–28 ===
Pos	Team	Pld	W	D	L	GF	GA	GD	Pts
1	Oviedo	10	8	1	1	45	11	+34	17
2	Racing Sama	10	6	1	3	22	19	+3	13
3	Racing Mieres	10	4	2	4	27	28	−1	10
4	Racing Gijón	10	3	2	5	19	25	−6	8
5	Fortuna Gijonés	10	2	2	6	16	29	−13	6
6	Stadium Avilesino	10	2	2	6	20	37	−17	6

Source: CIHEFE
Rules for classification: 1) Points; 2) Head-to-head; 3) Goal difference; 4) Number of goals scored

=== 1928–29 ===
Pos	Team	Pld	W	D	L	GF	GA	GD	Pts
1	Oviedo	6	4	2	0	31	9	+22	10
2	Sporting Gijón	6	2	4	0	24	12	+12	8
3	Racing Sama	6	1	1	4	9	28	−19	3
4	Club Gijón	6	1	1	4	9	24	−15	3

Source: CIHEFE
Rules for classification: 1) Points; 2) Head-to-head; 3) Goal difference; 4) Number of goals scored

=== 1929–30 ===
Pos	Team	Pld	W	D	L	GF	GA	GD	Pts
1	Sporting Gijón	6	4	1	1	15	7	+8	9
2	Oviedo	6	4	1	1	19	7	+12	9
3	Stadium Avilesino	6	2	0	4	8	19	−11	4
4	Club Gijón	6	1	0	5	6	15	−9	2

Source: CIHEFE
Rules for classification: 1) Points; 2) Head-to-head; 3) Goal difference; 4) Number of goals scored

=== 1930–31 ===
Pos	Team	Pld	W	D	L	GF	GA	GD	Pts
1	Sporting Gijón	6	5	0	1	23	6	+17	10
2	Oviedo	6	3	1	2	14	10	+4	7
3	Club Gijón	6	3	1	2	14	14	0	7
4	Stadium Avilesino	6	0	0	6	5	26	−21	0

Source: CIHEFE
Rules for classification: 1) Points; 2) Head-to-head; 3) Goal difference; 4) Number of goals scored

=== 1931–32 (played with Cantabria) ===
Pos	Team	Pld	W	D	L	GF	GA	GD	Pts
1	Oviedo	10	8	1	1	32	8	+24	17
2	Sporting Gijón	10	8	0	2	36	10	+26	16
3	Racing Santander	10	5	2	3	25	18	+7	12
4	Stadium Avilesino	10	2	1	7	21	33	−12	5
5	Club Gijón	10	2	1	7	10	31	−21	5
6	Eclipse FC Santander	10	2	1	7	17	41	−24	5

Source: CIHEFE
Rules for classification: 1) Points; 2) Head-to-head; 3) Goal difference; 4) Number of goals scored

=== 1932–33 ===
Pos	Team	Pld	W	D	L	GF	GA	GD	Pts
1	Oviedo	6	5	1	0	26	7	+19	11
2	Sporting Gijón	6	4	1	1	25	11	+14	9
3	Club Gijón	6	1	0	5	10	23	−13	2
4	Stadium Avilesino	6	1	0	5	7	27	−20	2

Source: CIHEFE
Rules for classification: 1) Points; 2) Head-to-head; 3) Goal difference; 4) Number of goals scored

=== 1933–34 ===
Pos	Team	Pld	W	D	L	GF	GA	GD	Pts
1	Oviedo	8	6	2	0	46	10	+36	14
2	Sporting Gijón	8	4	3	1	26	17	+9	11
3	Stadium Avilesino	8	3	2	3	18	13	+5	8
4	Unión Sport Ovetense	8	2	0	6	12	33	−21	4
5	Club Gijón	8	1	1	6	12	41	−29	3

Source: CIHEFE
Rules for classification: 1) Points; 2) Head-to-head; 3) Goal difference; 4) Number of goals scored

=== 1934–35 ===
Pos	Team	Pld	W	D	L	GF	GA	GD	Pts
1	Oviedo	4	4	0	0	19	10	+9	8
2	Sporting Gijón	4	1	1	2	6	8	−2	3
3	Stadium Avilesino	4	0	1	3	7	14	−7	1

Source: CIHEFE
Rules for classification: 1) Points; 2) Head-to-head; 3) Goal difference; 4) Number of goals scored

=== 1935–36 (played with Galicia) ===
Pos	Team	Pld	W	D	L	GF	GA	GD	Pts
1	Oviedo	10	8	1	1	42	8	+34	17
2	Unión SC	10	5	1	4	22	20	+2	11
3	Sporting Gijón	10	4	0	6	28	20	+8	8
4	Celta Vigo	10	3	2	5	20	29	−9	8
5	Stadium Avilesino	10	4	0	6	17	32	−15	8
6	Deportivo La Coruña	10	4	0	6	9	29	−20	8

Source: CIHEFE
Rules for classification: 1) Points; 2) Head-to-head; 3) Goal difference; 4) Number of goals scored

=== 1939–40 ===
Pos	Team	Pld	W	D	L	GF	GA	GD	Pts
1	Sporting Gijón	10	10	0	0	43	8	+35	20
2	Unión Sport Ovetense	10	4	4	2	22	22	0	12
3	Racing Sama	10	4	2	4	20	17	+3	10
4	Oriamendi	10	4	0	6	15	24	−9	8
5	CP La Felguera	10	2	1	7	9	27	−18	5
6	Stadium Avilesino	10	2	1	7	11	22	−11	5

Source: CIHEFE
Rules for classification: 1) Points; 2) Head-to-head; 3) Goal difference; 4) Number of goals scored
