= Iberia SC =

- Full name: Iberia Sport Club
- Nickname: Avispas
- Founded: 1916
- Dissolved: 1932
- Ground: Estadio Torrero; Zaragoza, Spain
- Capacity: 15,000
Home colours

Iberia Sport Club was a Spanish football club based in Zaragoza, Aragon. The club was founded in 1916, and played its games at Estadio Torrero. In 1932 it merged with Zaragoza Club Deportivo to form the current Real Zaragoza.

== History ==
=== Background ===
Zaragoza FC - (1921–1924) → ↓

Zaragoza FC - (1924–1925)

CD Fuenclara - (1918–1924) → ↑

Zaragoza FC - (1924–1925) → ↓

Zaragoza CD - (1925–1932)

Ath. Stadium - (1919–1924) → ↑

Iberia SC - (1916–1932) → ↓

Real Zaragoza - (1932–)

Zaragoza CD - (1925–1932) → ↑

== Seasons ==
Season	Tier	Division	Place	Copa del Rey
1929	2	2ª	2nd	
1929–30	2	2ª	3rd	
1930–31	2	2ª	10th	
1931–32	3	3ª	5th	

- 3 seasons in Segunda División
- 1 season in Tercera División
