= FC Barcelona =

Association football club in Spain

Barcelona
- Full name: Futbol Club Barcelona
- Nicknames: Barça or the Blaugrana (team); Culers or Barcelonistes (supporters); Blaugranes or Azulgranas (supporters)
- Founded: 29 November 1899; 126 years ago (as Foot-Ball Club Barcelona)
- Stadium: Camp Nou
- Capacity: 62,652 (current); 105,000 (expected)
- Coordinates: 41°22′51.2″N 2°07′22.2″E
- President: Joan Laporta
- Head coach: Hansi Flick
- League: La Liga
- 2025–26: La Liga, 1st of 20 (champions)
- Website: fcbarcelona.com
Home colours	Away colours	Third colours

Futbol Club Barcelona (Catalan pronunciation: [fudˈbɔl ˈklub bəɾsəˈlonə]), commonly known as FC Barcelona and colloquially as Barça ([ˈbaɾsə]), is a professional football club based in Barcelona, Catalonia, Spain, that competes in La Liga, the top division of Spanish football.

Founded in 1899 by a group of Swiss, Catalan, German, and English footballers led by Joan Gamper, the club has become a symbol of Catalan culture and Catalanism, hence the motto Més que un club ("More than a club"). Unlike many other football clubs, the supporters own and operate Barcelona. It is the third-most valuable football club in the world, worth $5.6 billion, and the world's fourth richest football club in terms of revenue, with an annual turnover of €800.1 million. The official Barcelona anthem is the "Cant del Barça", written by Jaume Picas i Guiu and Josep Maria Espinàs. Barcelona traditionally play in dark shades of blue and garnet stripes, hence nicknamed Blaugrana.

Barcelona are one of the world's most decorated clubs. Domestically, Barcelona has won a record 82 trophies: 29 La Liga, 32 Copa del Rey, 2 Copa de la Liga, 16 Supercopa de España and 3 Copa Eva Duarte titles, as well as being the record holder for the latter four competitions. In international club football, Barça has won 22 European and worldwide titles: five UEFA Champions League titles, a record four UEFA Cup Winners' Cups, a record three Inter-Cities Fairs Cups, five UEFA Super Cups, a joint record two Latin Cups and three FIFA Club World Cups. Barcelona was ranked first in the International Federation of Football History & Statistics Club World Ranking for 1997, 2009, 2011, 2012 and 2015, and occupies the ninth position on the UEFA club rankings as of May 2023. The club has a long-standing rivalry with Real Madrid, and matches between the two teams are referred to as El Clásico.

Barcelona is one of the most widely supported teams in the world, and the club has one of the largest social media followings in the world among sports teams. Barcelona players have won a joint record twelve Ballon d'Or awards, with recipients including Johan Cruyff, as well as a record six FIFA World Player of the Year awards, with winners including Romário, Ronaldo, Rivaldo, Ronaldinho and Lionel Messi. In 2010, three players who came through the club's youth academy—Lionel Messi, Andrés Iniesta and Xavi—were chosen as the three best players in the world in the Ballon d'Or ranking, an unprecedented feat for players from the same football academy. Additionally, players representing the club have won a record eight European Golden Shoe awards.

Barcelona is one of three founding members of the Primera División that have never been relegated from the top division since its inception in 1929, along with Athletic Bilbao and Real Madrid. In 2009, Barcelona became the first Spanish club to win the continental treble consisting of La Liga, Copa del Rey and UEFA Champions League titles, and also became the first European football club to win six competitions in a single year. In 2011, the club became European champions again, winning five trophies. This Barcelona team, which won fourteen trophies in just four years under manager Pep Guardiola, is considered by some in the sport to be the greatest of all time. By winning their fifth Champions League trophy in 2015 under Luis Enrique, Barcelona became the first European football club in history to achieve the continental treble twice.

== History ==
=== 1899–1922: Beginnings ===
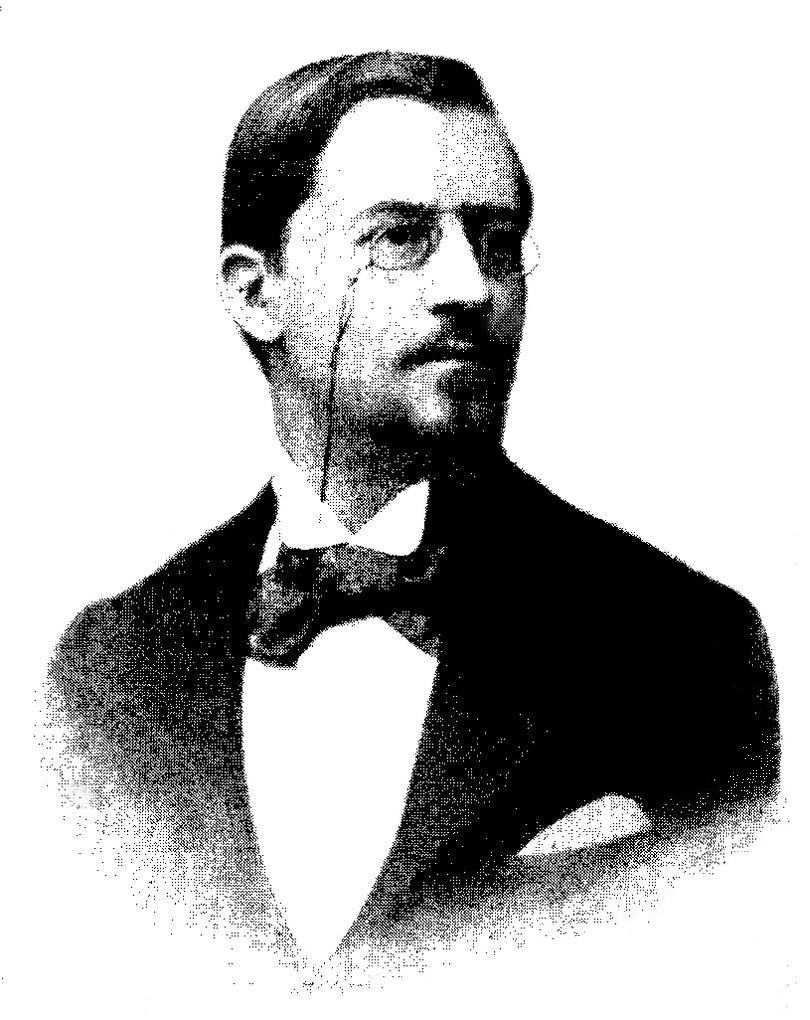
Walter Wild, the club's first president (1899–1901). His main achievement was providing Barça with its first home ground.

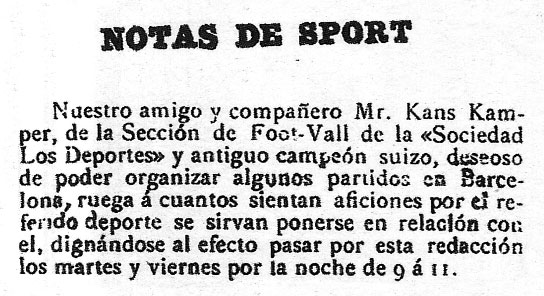
Gamper's advertisement in Los Deportes — English translation: "SPORT NOTE. Our friend and partner, Mr. Kans Kamper, from the Foot-Vall Section of the 'Sociedad Los Deportes' and former Swiss champion, wishing to organise some matches in Barcelona, requests that everyone who likes this sport contact him, come to this office Tuesday and Friday nights from 9 to 11."

On 22 October 1899, Swiss Hans Gamper placed an advertisement in Los Deportes declaring his wish to form a football club; a positive response resulted in a meeting at the Gimnasio Solé on 29 November. Eleven players attended – Walter Wild (the first president of the club), Luis de Ossó, Bartomeu Terradas, Otto Kunzle, Otto Maier, Enric Ducal, Pere Cabot, Carles Pujol, Josep Llobet, John Parsons, and William Parsons – and formed Foot-Ball Club Barcelona.

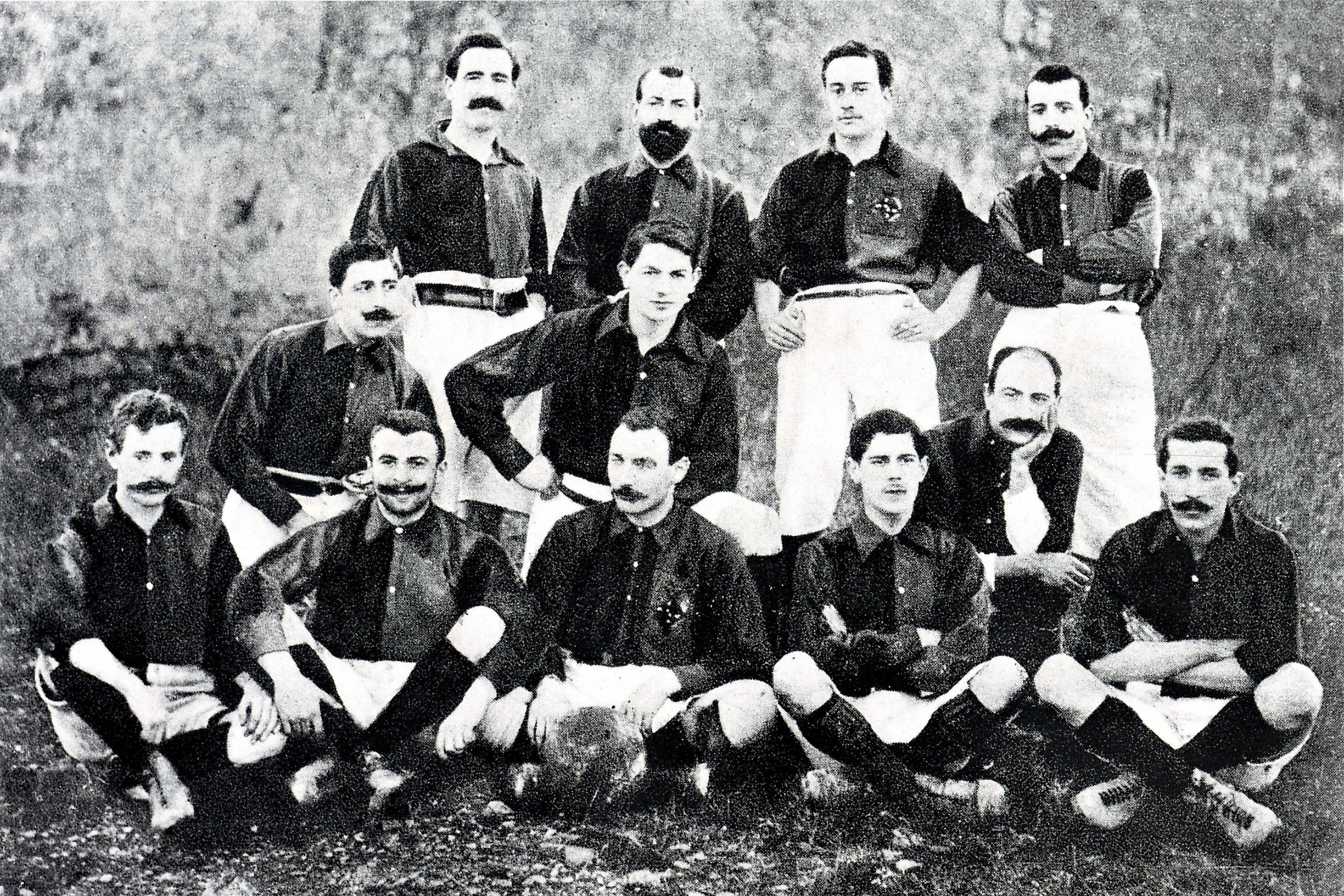
A formation of Barcelona in 1903

Barcelona had a successful start in regional and national cups, competing in the Campionat de Catalunya and the Copa del Rey. In 1901, the club participated in the first football competition played on the Iberian Peninsula, the Copa Macaya, narrowly losing to Hispania AC, but in the following year, Barça won the tournament, the club's first-ever piece of silverware, and then participated in the first Copa del Rey, losing 1–2 to Bizcaya (a combination of players from Athletic Club and Bilbao FC) in the final. In 1908, Hans Gamper – now known as Joan Gamper – became club president, attempting to prevent Barcelona from shutting down. The club was struggling financially, socially, and in performance. They had not won a competition since the Campionat de Catalunya in 1905. He said in a meeting: "Barcelona cannot die and must not die. If there is nobody who is going to try, then I will assume the responsibility of running the club from now on." He was club president on five occasions from 1908 to 1925. One of his main achievements was ensuring Barça acquired its own stadium and thus generated a stable income.

On 14 March 1909, the team moved into the Camp de la Indústria, a stadium with a capacity of 8,000. To celebrate their new surroundings, the club conducted a logo contest the following year. Carles Comamala won the contest, and his suggestion became the crest that the club still wears – with some minor changes – as of the present day.

The stadium is regarded as the main element that helped the club grow in the 1910s and become a dominant team, winning three successive Campionats de Catalunya between 1909 and 1911, three Copa del del Rey in four years between 1910 and 1913, and four successive Pyrenees Cup between the inaugural year in 1910 and 1913. The Pyrenees Cup was one of the earliest international club cups in Europe. It consisted of the best teams of Languedoc, Midi and Aquitaine (Southern France), the Basque Country and Catalonia, all former members of the Marca Hispanica region. The contest was the most prestigious in that era. Notable figures of Barça's first great team include Carles Comamala, Alfredo Massana, Amechazurra, Paco Bru, and Jack Greenwell. The latter became the club's first full-time coach in 1917.

During the same period, the club changed its official language from Castilian to Catalan and gradually evolved into an important symbol of Catalan identity. For many fans, participating in the club had less to do with the game itself and more with being a part of the club's collective identity. On 4 February 1917, the club held its first tribute match to honour Ramón Torralba, who played from 1913 to 1928. The match was against local side Terrassa where Barcelona won the match 6–2.

Gamper simultaneously launched a campaign to recruit more club members, and by 1922, the club had more than 20,000, who helped finance a new stadium. The club then moved to the new Les Corts (named after the neighbourhood where it is), which they inaugurated the same year. Les Corts had an initial capacity of 30,000, and in the 1940s it was expanded to 60,000.

In 1912, Gamper recruited Paulino Alcántara, the club's seventh all-time top-scorer. In 1917, Gamper also recruited Jack Greenwell as Barcelona's first full-time manager. After this hiring, the club's fortunes began to improve on the field and soon enjoyed its first "golden age". Along with Alcántara, the Barça team under Greenwell also included Sagibarba, Ricardo Zamora, Josep Samitier, Félix Sesúmaga, and Franz Platko. This team won nine out of ten Campionats de Catalunya between 1919 and 1928 and two Copa del Rey titles in 1920 and 1922. In total, during the Gamper-led era, Barcelona won eleven Campionats de Catalunya, six Copa del Rey and four Pyrenees Cups.

=== 1923–1931: Primo de Rivera, and first golden age ===
On 14 June 1925, in a spontaneous reaction against Primo de Rivera's dictatorship, the crowd in the stadium jeered the Royal March. As a reprisal, the ground was closed for six months and Gamper was forced to relinquish the presidency of the club. This coincided with the club's transition to professional football. The first time the directors of Barcelona publicly claimed to operate a professional football club was in 1926.

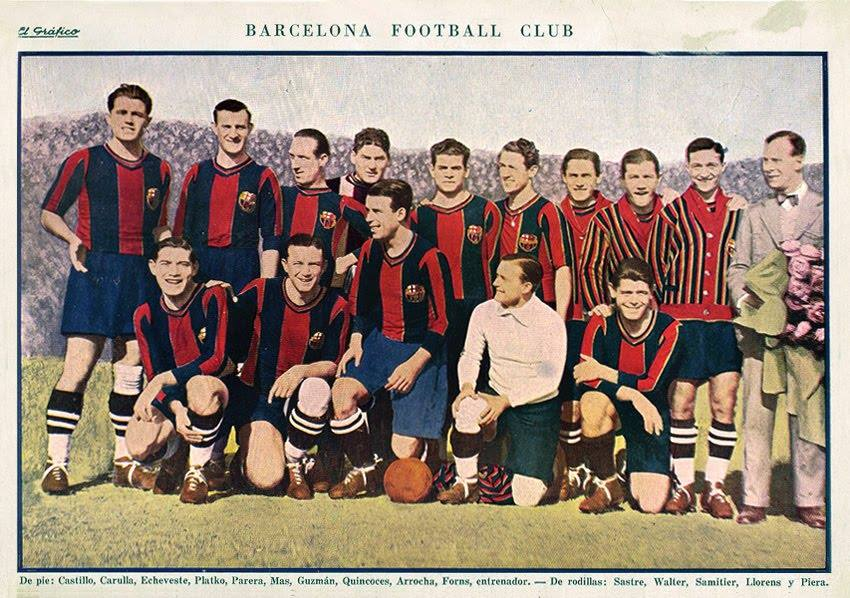
Team of Barcelona, published on El Gráfico, 1926

On 3 July 1927, the club held a second testimonial match for Paulino Alcántara, against the Spanish national team. To kick off the match, local journalist and pilot Josep Canudas dropped the ball onto the pitch from his aeroplane. In 1928, victory in the Spanish Cup was celebrated with a poem titled "Oda a Platko", which was written by a member of the Generation of '27, Rafael Alberti, inspired by the performance of the Barcelona goalkeeper Franz Platko. On 23 June 1929, Barcelona won the inaugural Spanish League. A year after winning the championship, on 30 July 1930, Gamper committed suicide after a period of depression brought on by personal and financial problems.

=== 1931–1939: Republic, and Civil War: Assassination of President Sunyol ===
Although they continued to have players of the standing of Josep Escolà, the club now entered a period of decline, in which political conflict overshadowed sports throughout society. Attendance at matches dropped as the citizens of Barcelona were occupied with discussing political matters. Although the team won the Campionat de Catalunya in 1930, 1931, 1932, 1934, 1936, and 1938, they did not win at a national level in this time, with the exception of their 1937 disputed title in the Mediterranean League.

A month after the Spanish Civil War began in 1936, several players from Barcelona enlisted in the ranks of those who fought against the military uprising, along with players from Athletic Bilbao. On 6 August, Falangist soldiers near Guadarrama murdered club president Josep Sunyol, a representative of the pro-independence political party. He was dubbed the martyr of barcelonisme, and his assassination was a defining moment in the history of Barcelona and Catalan identity. In the summer of 1937, the squad was on tour in Mexico and the United States, where it was received as an ambassador of the Second Spanish Republic. The tour led to the financial security of the club, but also resulted in half of the team seeking asylum in Mexico and France, making it harder for the remaining team to contest for trophies.

On 16 March 1938, Barcelona came under aerial bombardment from the Italian Air Force, causing more than 3,000 deaths, with one of the bombs hitting the club's offices. A few months later, Catalonia came under occupation, and as a symbol of the "undisciplined" Catalanism, the club, now down to just 3,486 members, faced a number of restrictions. All signs of regional nationalism, including language, flag and other signs of separatism were banned throughout Spain. The Catalan flag was banned and the club were prohibited from using non-Spanish names. These measures forced the club to change its name to Club de Fútbol Barcelona and to remove the Catalan flag from its crest.

=== 1940–1957: Post-war, and start of Franco's regime ===
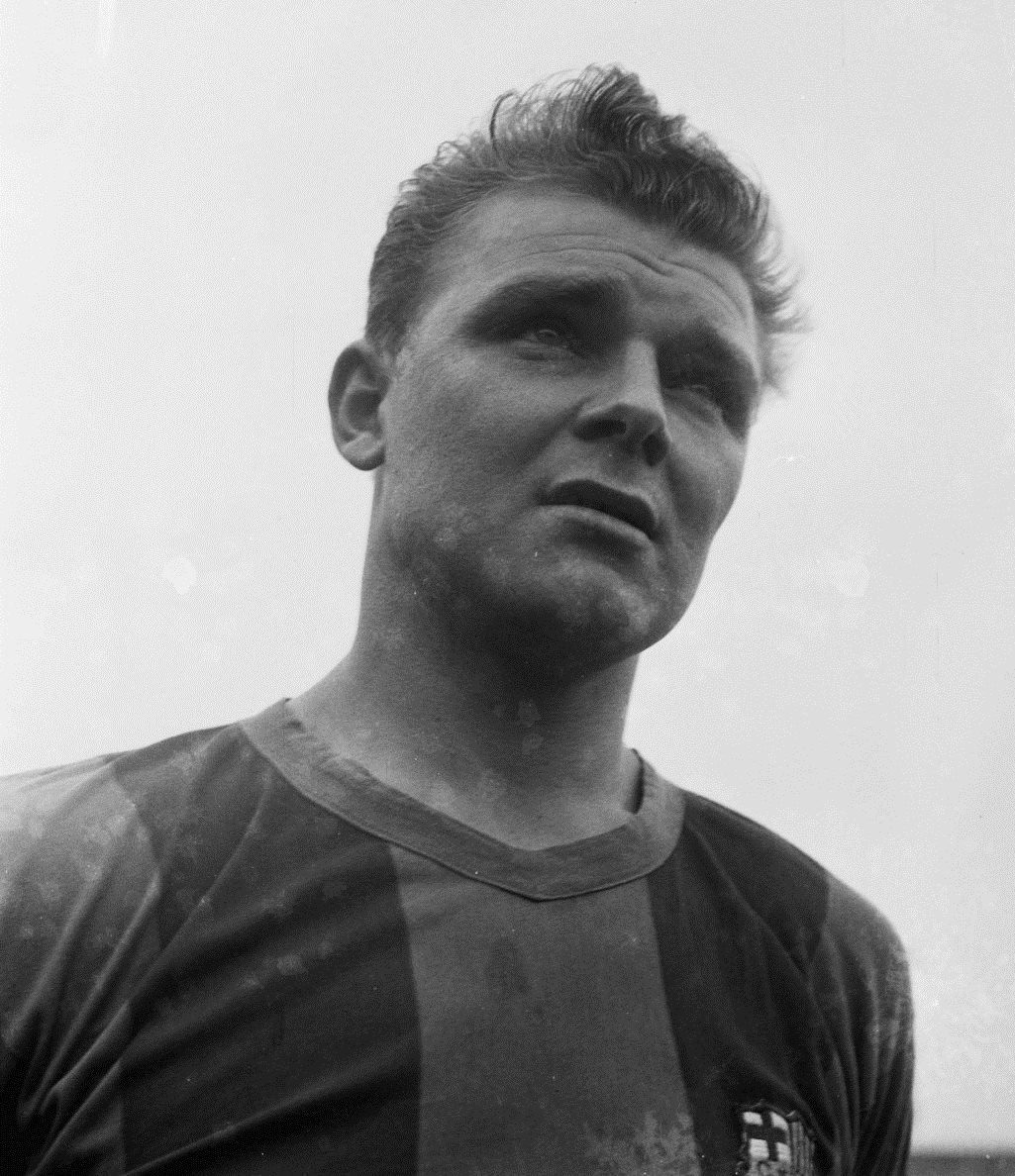
A prolific forward, László Kubala led Barcelona to success in the 1950s. His statue is built outside the Camp Nou.

In 1943, Barcelona faced rivals Real Madrid in the semi-finals of Copa del Generalísimo (now the Copa del Rey). The first match at Les Corts was won by Barcelona 3–0. Real Madrid comfortably won the second leg, beating Barcelona 11–1. According to football writer Sid Lowe: "There have been relatively few mentions of the game [since] and it is not a result that has been particularly celebrated in Madrid. Indeed, the 11–1 occupies a far more prominent place in Barcelona's history. This was the game that first formed the identification of Madrid as the team of the dictatorship and Barcelona as its victims." It has been alleged by local journalist Paco Aguilar that Barcelona's players were threatened by police in the changing room, though nothing was ever proven.

Despite the difficult political situation, CF Barcelona enjoyed considerable success during the 1940s and 1950s. In 1945, with Josep Samitier as coach and players like César, Ramallets and Velasco, they won La Liga for the first time since 1929. They added two more titles in 1948 and 1949. In 1949, they also won the first Copa Latina. In June 1950, Barcelona signed László Kubala, who was to be an important figure at the club.

On a rainy Sunday of 1951, the crowd left Les Corts stadium after a 2–1 win against Santander by foot, refusing to catch any trams, and surprising the Francoist authorities. A tram strike was taking place in Barcelona, and it received the support of blaugrana fans. Events like this made CF Barcelona represent much more than just Catalonia. Many progressive Spaniards saw the club as a staunch defender of rights and freedoms.

Coach Ferdinand Daučík and László Kubala led the team to five different trophies in 1952. These were La Liga, the Copa del Generalísimo, the Copa Latina, the Copa Eva Duarte, and the Copa Martini & Rossi. In 1953, the club won La Liga and the Copa del Generalísimo again.

=== 1957–1978: Club de Fútbol Barcelona ===
With Helenio Herrera as coach, a young Luis Suárez, the European Footballer of the Year in 1960, and two Hungarians recommended by Kubala, Sándor Kocsis and Zoltán Czibor, the team won another national double in 1959 and a La Liga and Fairs Cup double in 1960. In 1961, they became the first club to beat Real Madrid in a European Cup play-off. However, they lost 2–3 to Benfica in the final.

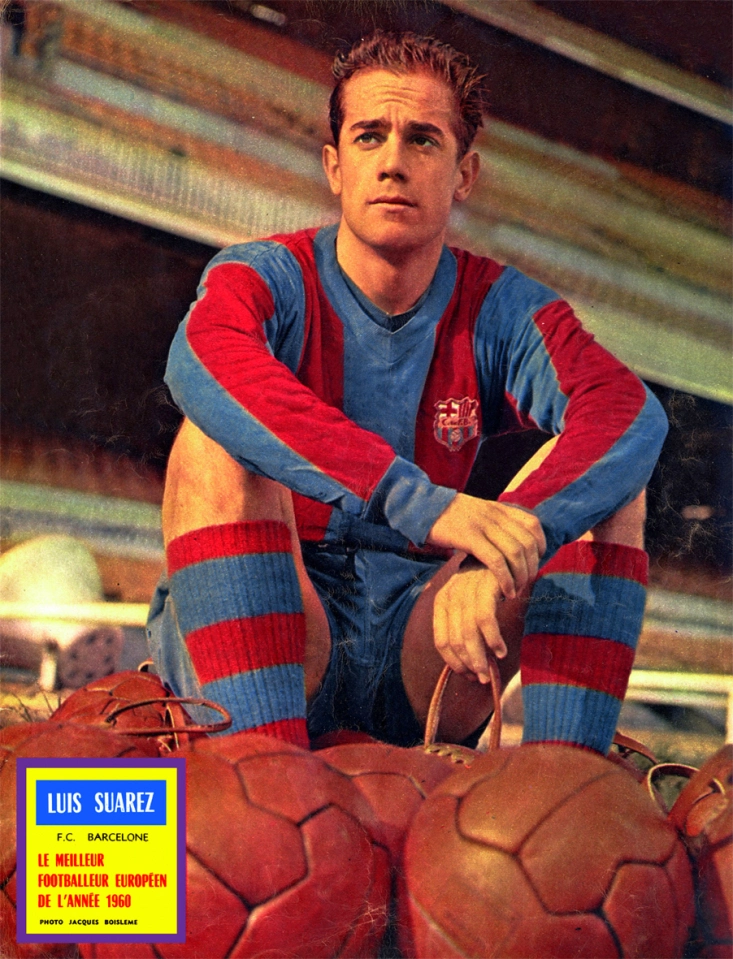
Luis Suárez, the first Barcelona player to win the Ballon d'Or.

The 1960s were less successful for the club, with Real Madrid monopolising La Liga. The completion of the Camp Nou, finished in 1957, meant the club had little money to spend on new players. The 1960s saw the emergence of Josep Maria Fusté and Carles Rexach, and the club won the Copa del Generalísimo in 1963 and the Fairs Cup in 1966. Barcelona beat Real Madrid 1–0 in the 1968 Copa del Generalísimo final at the Santiago Bernabéu in front of dictator Francisco Franco, with coach Salvador Artigas, a former republican pilot in the Civil War. With the end of Franco's dictatorship in 1974, the club changed its official name back to Futbol Club Barcelona and reverted the crest to its original design, including the original letters.

Johan Cruyff joined in the 1973–74 season. He was signed for a world record £920,000 from Ajax. Already an established player with Ajax, Cruyff quickly won over the Barcelona fans when he told the European press that he chose Barcelona over Real Madrid because he could not play for a club associated with Francisco Franco. He further endeared himself when he named his son "Jordi", after the local Catalan Saint George. Next to champions like Juan Manuel Asensi, Carles Rexach and Hugo Sotil, he helped the club win the 1973–74 season for the first time since 1960, defeating Real Madrid 5–0 at the Santiago Bernabéu en route. He was crowned European Footballer of the Year in 1973 during his first season with Barcelona (his second Ballon d'Or win; he won his first while playing for Ajax in 1971). Cruyff received this award a third time (the first player to do so) in 1974, while he was still with Barcelona.

=== 1978–2000: Núñez and stabilization ===
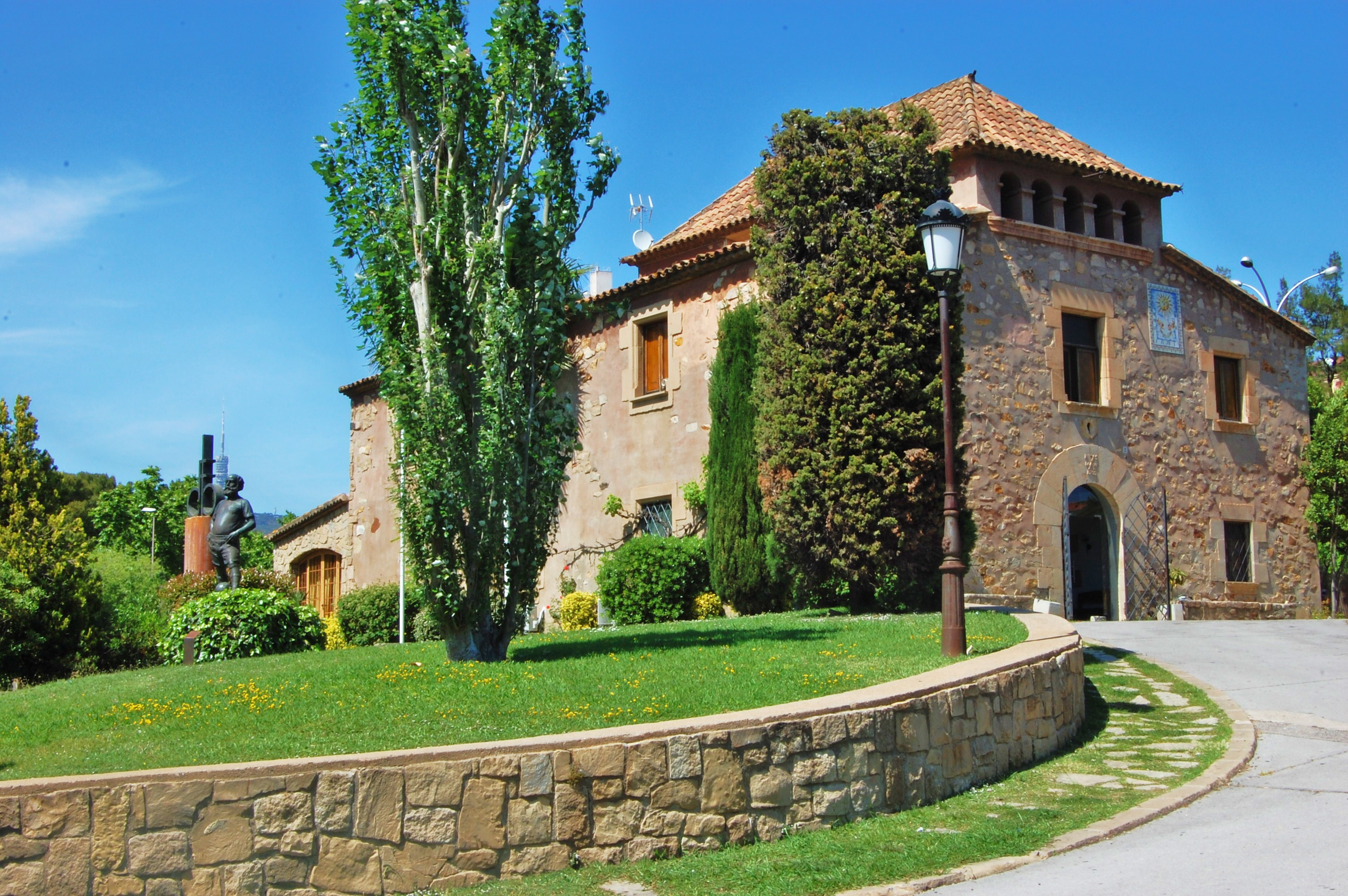
In 1979, Barcelona made La Masia, a farmer's house built in 1702, adjacent to the Camp Nou, the residence for young academy players. It would later play a significant role in the club's future success.

In 1978, Josep Lluís Núñez became the first elected president of Barcelona. Since then, the members of Barcelona have elected the club president. The process of electing a president of Barcelona was closely tied to Spain's transition to democracy in 1974 and the end of Franco's dictatorship. The new president's main objective was to develop Barcelona into a world-class club by giving it stability both on and off the pitch. His presidency lasted 22 years. It deeply affected the image of Barcelona, as Núñez held to a strict policy regarding wages and discipline, letting go of such players as Diego Maradona, Romário and Ronaldo rather than meeting their demands.

The club won its first European Cup Winners' Cup on 16 May 1979, beating Fortuna Düsseldorf 4–3 in Basel. More than 30,000 travelling blaugrana fans watched the final. The same year, Núñez began to invest in the club's youth programme by converting La Masia (the farmhouse in the property where the Camp Nou was built) into a dormitory for young academy players from abroad. The name of the dormitory would later become synonymous with the youth programme of Barcelona.

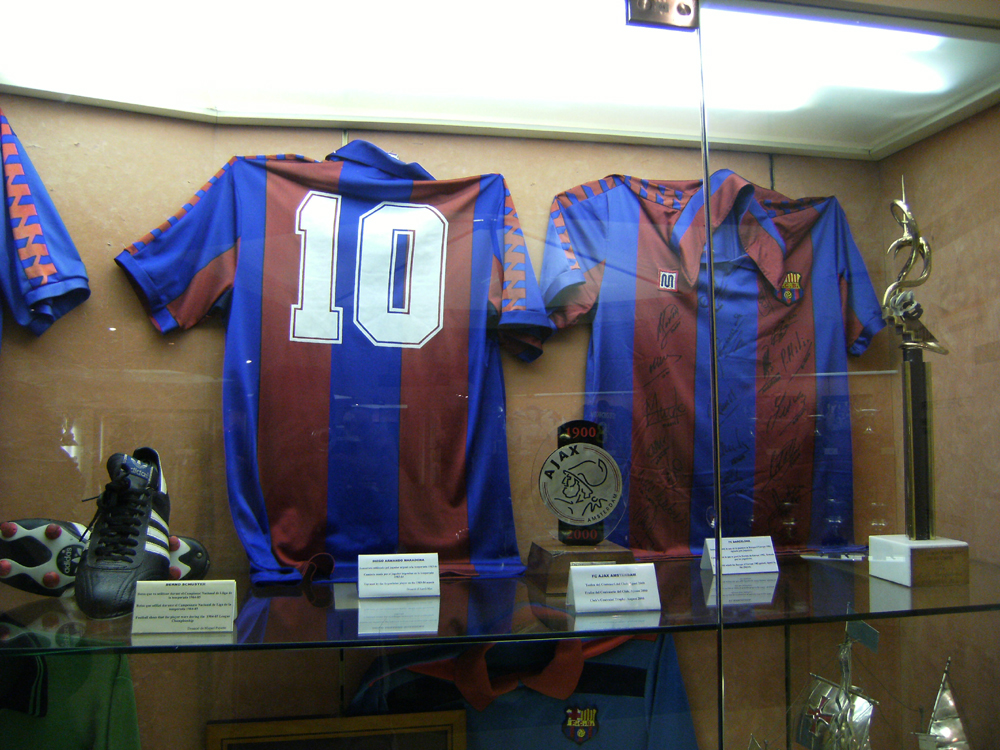
Diego Maradona's blaugrana shirt on display in the Barcelona Museum

In June 1982, Diego Maradona was signed for a world record fee of £5 million from Boca Juniors. In the following season, under coach César Luis Menotti, Barcelona won the Copa del Rey, beating Real Madrid. Maradona soon left to join Napoli. At the start of the 1984–85 season, Terry Venables was hired as manager. He won La Liga with noteworthy displays by German midfielder Bernd Schuster. The next season, he took the team to their second European Cup final. The team lost on penalties to Steaua București in Seville.

Around this time, tensions began to arise between what was perceived as president Núñez's dictatorial rule and the nationalistic support group, Boixos Nois. The group, identified with a left-wing separatism, repeatedly demanded the resignation of Núñez and openly defied him through chants and banners at matches. At the same time, Barcelona experienced an eruption in skinheads, who often identified with a right-wing separatism. The skinheads slowly transferred the Boixos Nois' ideology from liberalism to fascism, which caused division within the group and a sudden support for Núñez's presidency. Inspired by British hooligans, the remaining Boixos Nois became violent, causing havoc leading to large-scale arrests.

After the 1986 FIFA World Cup, Barcelona signed the English top scorer Gary Lineker, along with goalkeeper Andoni Zubizarreta, but the team could not achieve success, as Schuster was excluded from the team. Terry Venables was fired at the beginning of the 1987–88 season and replaced with Luis Aragonés. The season finished with the players rebelling against president Núñez, in an event known as the Hesperia mutiny, and a 1–0 victory in the Copa del Rey final against Real Sociedad.

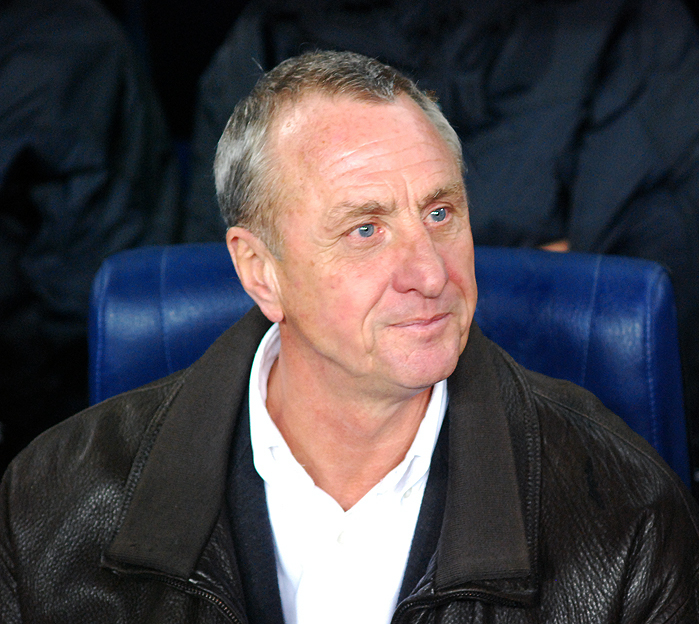
As coach of the "Dream Team", Johan Cruyff won four consecutive league titles with Barcelona.

In 1988, Johan Cruyff returned to the club, this time as manager. He assembled what would later be dubbed the "Dream Team". He used Spanish players like Pep Guardiola, José Mari Bakero, Jon Andoni Goikoetxea, Miguel Angel Nadal and Txiki Begiristain, and also signed international players such as Ronald Koeman, Michael Laudrup, Romário and Hristo Stoichkov.

Ten years after the inception of the youth programme, La Masia, its players began to graduate and play for their first team. Pep Guardiola, the future head coach of Barcelona, was one of the first graduates and would go on to receive international recognition. Under Cruyff's guidance, Barcelona won four consecutive La Liga titles from 1991 to 1994. They beat Sampdoria in both the 1989 UEFA Cup Winners' Cup final and the 1992 European Cup final at Wembley, with a free kick goal from Dutch international Ronald Koeman. They also won a Copa del Rey in 1990, the European Super Cup in 1992 and three Supercopa de España trophies. With 11 trophies, Cruyff became the club's most successful manager at that point. He also became the club's longest consecutive serving manager, serving eight years. Cruyff did not win any trophies in his final two seasons, and fell out with president Josep Lluís Núñez, resulting in his departure.

Reacting to Cruyff's departure, an independent protest group was organised by Armand Caraben, Joan Laporta and Alfons Godall. The objective of the group, called L'Elefant Blau, was to oppose the presidency of Núñez, which they regarded as a corruption of the club's traditional values. Laporta would later take over the presidency of Barcelona in 2003.

Cruyff was briefly replaced by Bobby Robson, who took charge of the club for a single season in 1996–97. He recruited Ronaldo for a world record transfer fee from his previous club, PSV, and delivered a cup treble, winning the Copa del Rey, UEFA Cup Winners' Cup and the Supercopa de España, with Ronaldo registering 47 goals in 49 games. Despite his success, Robson was only ever seen as a short-term solution while the club waited for Louis van Gaal to become available.

Ronaldo soon left for Inter Milan in another world record transfer. However, new heroes emerged, such as Luís Figo, Patrick Kluivert, Luis Enrique and Rivaldo, and the team won a Copa del Rey and La Liga double in 1998. In 1999, the club celebrated its centenari, winning the Primera División title, and Rivaldo became the fourth Barcelona player to be awarded European Footballer of the Year. Despite this domestic success, the failure to emulate Real Madrid in the Champions League led to van Gaal and Núñez resigning in 2000.

=== 2000–2008: Exit Núñez, enter Laporta ===
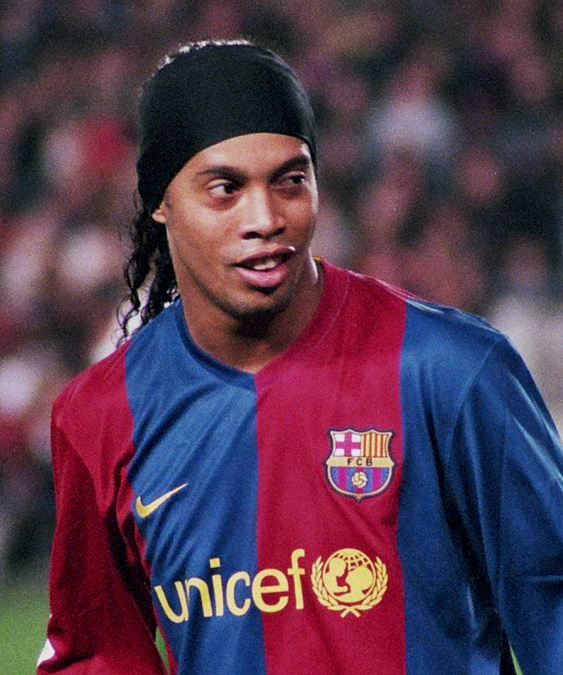
Ronaldinho's arrival in 2003 revitalized the club.

The departures of Núñez and Van Gaal were hardly noticed by the fans when compared to that of Luís Figo, then club vice-captain. Figo had become a cult hero and was considered by Catalans to be one of their own. Barcelona fans, however, were distraught by Figo's decision to join arch-rivals Real Madrid, and, during subsequent visits to Camp Nou, Figo was given an extremely hostile reception. Upon his first return, a piglet's head and a full bottle of whiskey were thrown at him from the crowd. The next three years saw the club in decline, and managers came and went. Van Gaal was replaced by Lorenzo Serra Ferrer who, despite an extensive investment in players in the summer of 2000, presided over a mediocre league campaign and a first-round Champions League exit, and was dismissed late in the season. Long-serving Barcelona assistant coach Carles Rexach was appointed as his replacement, initially on a temporary basis, and managed to at least steer the club to the last Champions League spot on the final day of the season against Valencia via an exceptional performance from Rivaldo, who completed arguably the greatest hat-trick in history with an overhead bicycle kick winner in the final minute to secure qualification.

Despite better form in La Liga and a good run to the semi-finals of the Champions League, Rexach was never viewed as a long-term solution and that summer Van Gaal returned to the club for a second spell as manager. What followed, despite another decent Champions League performance, was one of the worst La Liga campaigns in the club's history, with the team as low as 15th in February 2003. This led to Van Gaal's resignation and replacement for the rest of the campaign by Radomir Antić, though a sixth-place finish was the best that he could manage. At the end of the season, Antić's short-term contract was not renewed, and club president Joan Gaspart resigned, his position having been made completely untenable by such a disastrous season on top of the club's overall decline in fortunes since he became president three years prior.

After the disappointment of the Gaspart era, the combination of a new young president, Joan Laporta, and a young new manager, former Dutch and AC Milan star Frank Rijkaard, saw the club bounce back. On the field, an influx of international players, including Ronaldinho, Deco, Henrik Larsson, Ludovic Giuly, Samuel Eto'o, Rafael Márquez and Edgar Davids, combined with home grown Spanish players, such as Carles Puyol, Andrés Iniesta, Xavi and Víctor Valdés, led to the club's return to success. Barcelona won La Liga and the Supercopa de España in 2004–05, and Ronaldinho and Eto'o were voted first and third, respectively, in the FIFA World Player of the Year awards.

In the 2005–06 season, Barcelona repeated their league and Supercopa successes. The pinnacle of the league season arrived at the Santiago Bernabéu in a 3–0 win over Real Madrid. It was Rijkaard's second victory at the Bernabéu, making him the first Barcelona manager to win there twice. Ronaldinho's performance was so impressive that after his second goal, which was Barcelona's third, some Real Madrid fans gave him a standing ovation. In the Champions League, Barcelona beat English club Arsenal in the final. Trailing 1–0 to a ten-man Arsenal and with less than 15 minutes remaining, they came back to win 2–1, with substitute Henrik Larsson, in his final appearance for the club, setting up goals for Samuel Eto'o and fellow substitute Juliano Belletti, for the club's first European Cup victory in 14 years.

Despite being the favourites and starting strongly, Barcelona finished the 2006–07 season without trophies. A pre-season US tour was later blamed for a string of injuries to key players, including leading scorer Eto'o and rising star Lionel Messi. There was open feuding as Eto'o publicly criticised coach Rijkaard and Ronaldinho. Ronaldinho also admitted that a lack of fitness affected his form. In La Liga, Barcelona were in first place for much of the season, but inconsistency in the New Year saw Real Madrid overtake them to become champions. Barcelona advanced to the semi-finals of the Copa del Rey, winning the first leg against Getafe 5–2, with a goal from Messi bringing comparison to Diego Maradona's goal of the century, but then lost the second leg 4–0. They took part in the 2006 FIFA Club World Cup, but were beaten by a late goal in the final against Brazilian side Internacional. In the Champions League, Barcelona were knocked out of the competition in the last 16 by eventual runners-up Liverpool on away goals.

Barcelona finished the 2007–08 season third in La Liga and reached the semi-finals of the UEFA Champions League and Copa del Rey, both times losing to the eventual champions, Manchester United and Valencia, respectively. The day after a 4–1 defeat to Real Madrid, Joan Laporta announced that Barcelona B coach Pep Guardiola would take over Frank Rijkaard's duties on 30 June 2008.

=== 2008–2012: Guardiola era ===
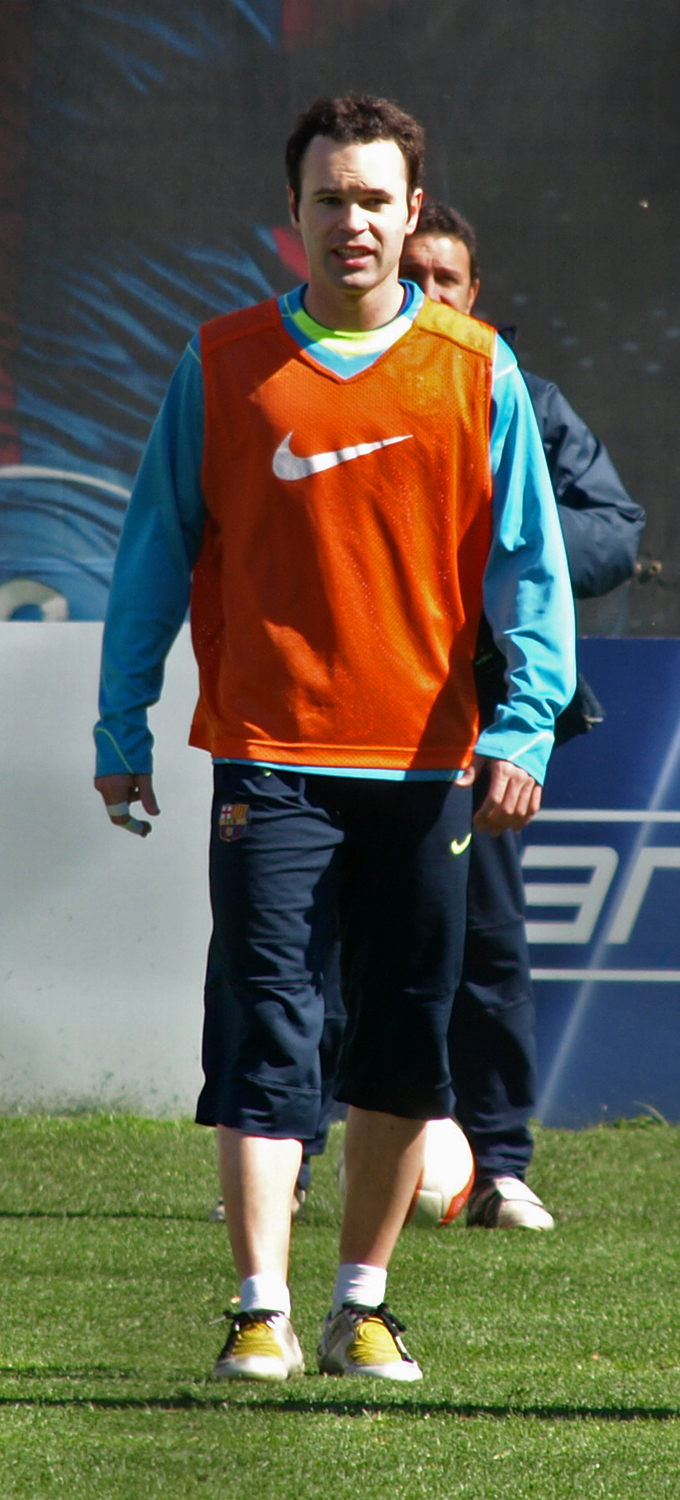
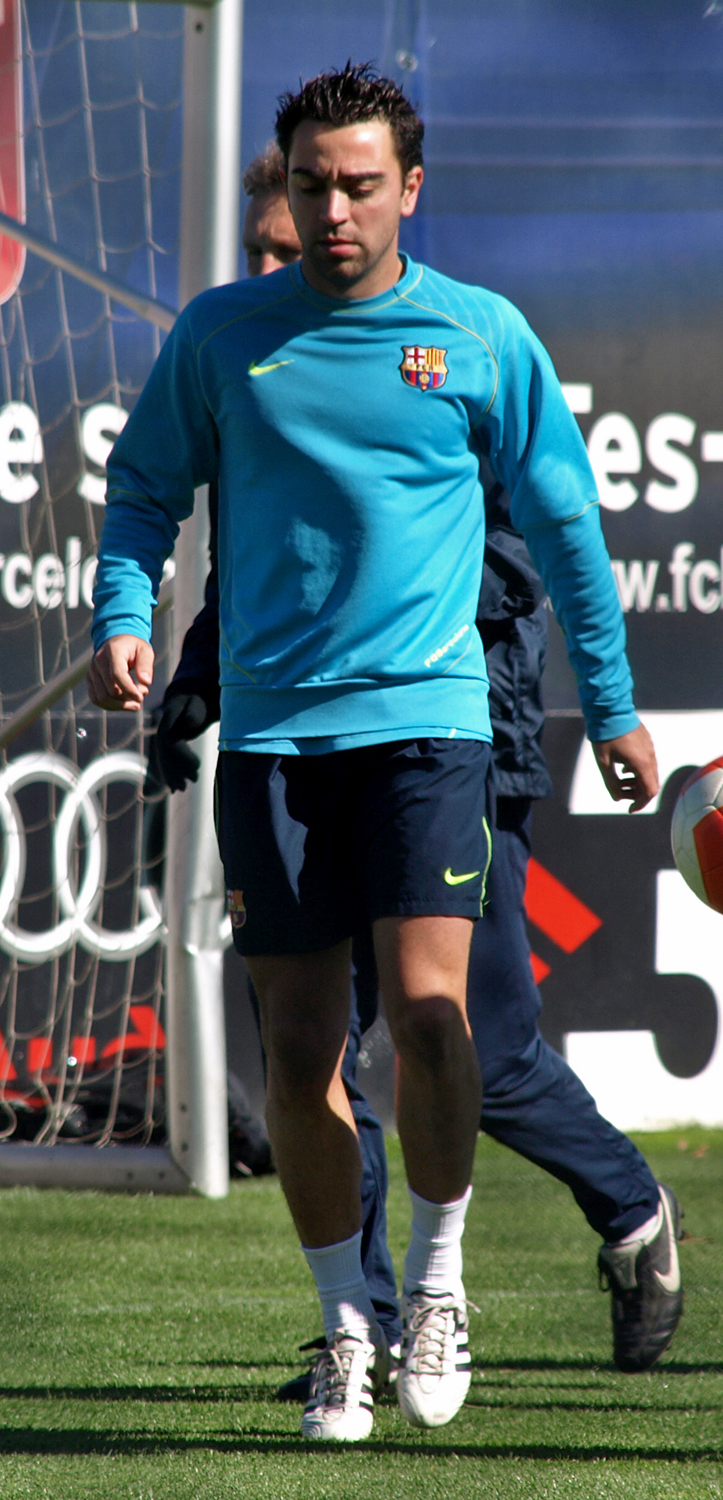
Barcelona's midfield combination of Andrés Iniesta (left) and Xavi (right) were at the heart of Guardiola's tiki-taka passing style of play.

Pep Guardiola brought with him the now famous tiki-taka style of play he had been taught during his time in the Barcelona youth teams. In the process, Guardiola sold Ronaldinho and Deco and started building the Barcelona team around Xavi, Andrés Iniesta and Lionel Messi.

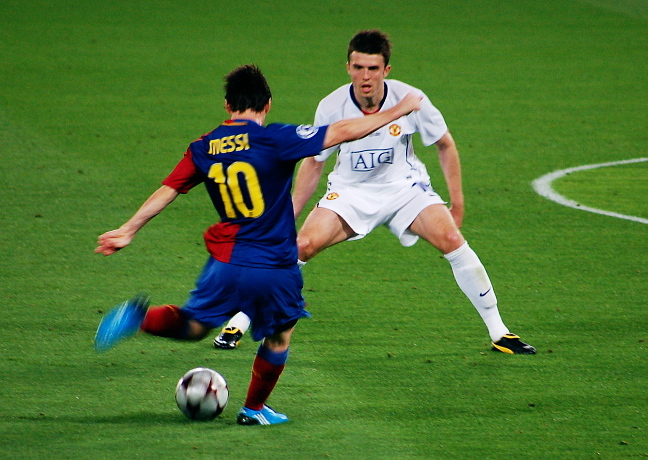
Lionel Messi in action during the 2009 UEFA Champions League Final victory against Manchester United.

Barça beat Athletic Bilbao 4–1 in the 2009 Copa del Rey final, winning the competition for a record-breaking 25th time. A historic 2–6 victory against Real Madrid followed three days later and ensured that Barcelona became 2008–09 La Liga champions. Barça finished the season by beating Manchester United 2–0 at the Stadio Olimpico in Rome, with goals from Eto'o and Messi, to win their third Champions League title, and complete the first ever treble won by a Spanish team. The team went on to win the 2009 Supercopa de España against Athletic Bilbao and the 2009 UEFA Super Cup against Shakhtar Donetsk, becoming the first European club to win both domestic and European Super Cups following a treble. In December 2009, Barcelona won the 2009 Club World Cup. Barcelona accomplished two new records in Spanish football in 2010 as they retained the La Liga trophy with 99 points and won the Supercopa de España for a ninth time.

After Laporta's departure from the club in June 2010, Sandro Rosell was soon elected as the new president. The elections were held on 13 June, where he received 61.35% (57,088 votes, a record) of total votes. Rosell signed David Villa from Valencia for €40 million and Javier Mascherano from Liverpool for €19 million. At the 2010 World Cup in South Africa, Barcelona players that had graduated from the club's La Masia youth system would play a major role in Spain becoming world champions. On 11 July, seven players who came through the academy participated in the final, six of whom were Barcelona players who started the match, with Iniesta scoring the winning goal against the Netherlands.

In November 2010, Barcelona defeated their main rival Real Madrid 5–0 in El Clásico. At the ceremony for the 2010 FIFA Ballon d'Or in December, Barcelona's La Masia became the first youth academy ever to have all three finalists for the Ballon d'Or, with Messi, Iniesta and Xavi being named the three best players in the world for 2010. In the 2010–11 season, Barcelona retained the La Liga trophy, their third title in succession, finishing with 96 points. In April 2011, the club reached the Copa del Rey final, losing 1–0 to Real Madrid at the Mestalla in Valencia. In May, Barcelona defeated Manchester United in the 2011 Champions League Final 3–1 held at Wembley, a repeat of the 2009 final, winning their fourth European Cup. In August 2011, La Masia graduate Cesc Fàbregas was transferred from Arsenal and he would help Barcelona defend the Spanish Supercup against Real Madrid. The Supercup victory brought the total number of official trophies to 73, matching the number of titles won by Real Madrid.

Later the same month, Barcelona won the UEFA Super Cup defeating Porto 2–0 with goals from Messi and Fàbregas. This extended the club's overall number of official trophies to 74, surpassing Real Madrid's total amount of official trophies. The Super Cup victory also saw Guardiola win his 12th trophy out of a possible 15 in his three years at the helm of the club, becoming the all-time record holder of most titles won as a coach at Barcelona.

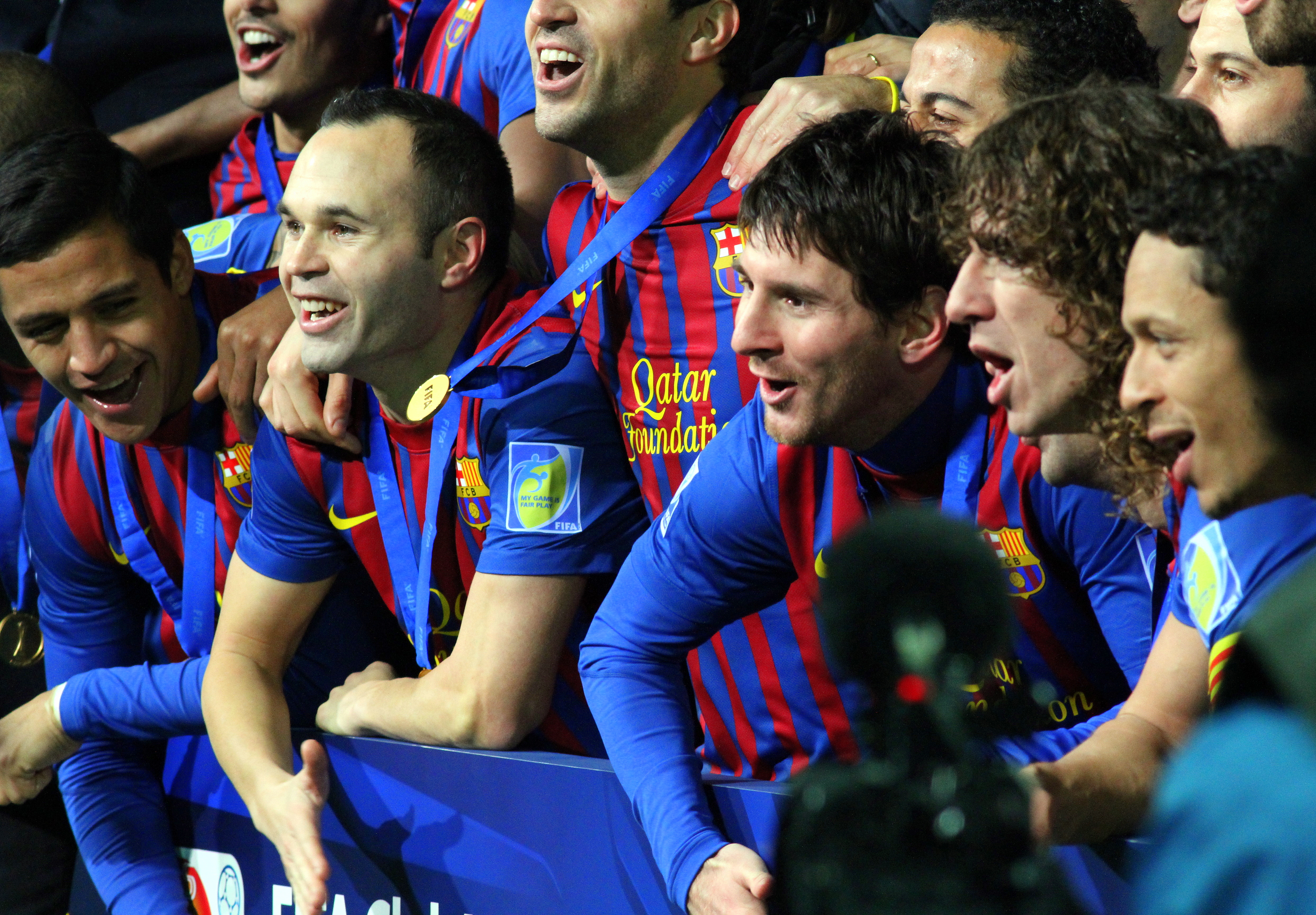
Barcelona celebrating their 2011 FIFA Club World Cup win against Santos

In December, Barcelona won the Club World Cup for a record second time since its establishment, after defeating 2011 Copa Libertadores holders Santos 4–0 in the final thanks to two goals from Messi and goals from Xavi and Fàbregas. As a result, the overall trophy haul during the reign of Guardiola was further extended and saw Barcelona win their 13th trophy out of a possible 16. Considered by some in the sport to be the greatest team of all time, with Manchester United manager Alex Ferguson stating, "They mesmerise you with their passing", their five trophies in 2011 saw them receive the Laureus World Sports Award for Team of the Year.

In the 2011–12 season, Barcelona lost the semi-finals of the Champions League against Chelsea. Guardiola, who had been on a rolling contract and had faced criticism over his recent tactics and squad selections, announced that he would step down as manager on 30 June and be succeeded by assistant Tito Vilanova. Guardiola finished his tenure with Barça winning the Copa del Rey final 3–0, bringing the tally to 14 trophies that Barça had won under his coaching.

Following Vilanova's appointment, Barcelona went on an incredible run that saw them hold the top spot on the league table for the entire season, recording only two losses and amassing 100 points. Their top scorer once again was Lionel Messi, who scored 46 goals in La Liga, including two hat-tricks. On 11 May 2013, Barcelona were crowned as the Spanish football champions for the 22nd time, still with four games left to play. Ultimately, Barcelona ended the season 15 points clear of rivals Real Madrid, despite losing 2–1 to them at the beginning of March. They reached the semi-final stage of both the Copa del Rey and the Champions League, going out to Real Madrid and Bayern Munich respectively. On 19 July, it was announced that Vilanova was resigning as Barcelona manager because his throat cancer had returned, and he would be receiving treatment for the second time after a three-month medical leave in December 2012.

=== 2014–2020: Bartomeu era ===
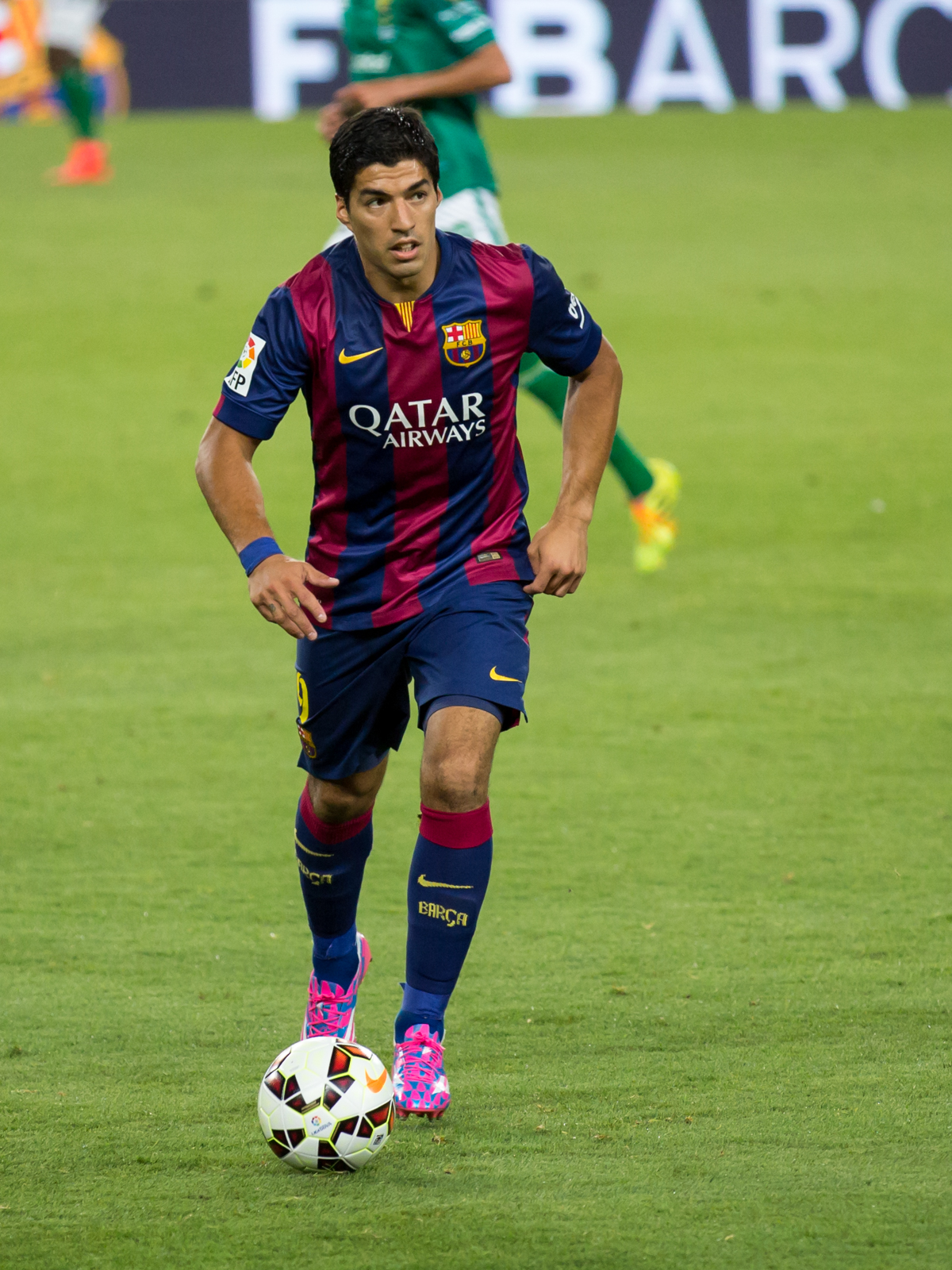
Luis Suárez joined the club in 2014. Messi, Suárez and Neymar, dubbed "MSN", formed a record-breaking strike force.

On 22 July 2013, Gerardo "Tata" Martino was confirmed as manager of Barcelona for the 2013–14 season. Barcelona won the 2013 Supercopa de España 1–1 on away goals. On 23 January 2014, Sandro Rosell resigned as president by the admissibility of a complaint for alleged misappropriation following the transfer of Neymar. Josep Maria Bartomeu replaced him to finish the term.

Barcelona won the treble in the 2014–15 season, winning La Liga, Copa del Rey and Champions League titles, and became the first European team to have won the treble twice. On 17 May, the club clinched their 23rd La Liga title after defeating Atlético Madrid. This was Barcelona's seventh La Liga title in the last ten years. On 30 May, the club defeated Athletic Bilbao in the Copa del Rey final at Camp Nou. On 6 June, Barcelona won the 2015 Champions League Final with a 3–1 win against Juventus, which completed the treble, the club's second in six years. Barcelona's attacking trio of Messi, Suárez and Neymar, dubbed "MSN", scored 122 goals in all competitions, the most in a season for an attacking trio in Spanish football history.

On 11 August, Barcelona started the 2015–16 season winning a joint record fifth European Super Cup by beating Sevilla 5–4 in the 2015 UEFA Super Cup. They ended the year with a 3–0 win over Argentine club River Plate in the 2015 Club World Cup final on 20 December to win the trophy for a record third time, with Suárez, Messi and Iniesta the top three players of the tournament. The Club World Cup was Barcelona's 20th international title, a record only matched by Egyptian club Al Ahly. By scoring 180 goals in 2015 in all competitions, Barcelona set the record for most goals scored in a calendar year, breaking Real Madrid's record of 178 goals scored in 2014. On 10 February 2016, qualifying for the sixth Copa del Rey final in the last eight seasons, Luis Enrique's Barcelona broke the club's record of 28 consecutive games unbeaten in all competitions set by Guardiola's team in the 2010–11 season, with a 1–1 draw with Valencia in the second leg of the 2015–16 Copa del Rey. With a 5–1 win at Rayo Vallecano on 3 March, Barcelona's 35th match unbeaten, the club broke Real Madrid's Spanish record of 34 games unbeaten in all competitions from the 1988–1989 season. After Barça reached 39 matches unbeaten, their run ended on 2 April 2016 with a 2–1 defeat to Real Madrid at Camp Nou. On 14 May 2016, Barcelona won their sixth La Liga title in eight seasons. The front three of Messi, Suárez and Neymar finished the season with 131 goals, breaking the record they had set the previous year for most goals by an attacking trio in a single season.

On 8 March 2017, Barcelona made the largest comeback in Champions League history in the 2016–17 UEFA Champions League Round of 16 second Leg, defeating Paris Saint-Germain 6–1 (aggregate score 6–5), despite losing the first leg in France by a score of 4–0. On 29 May 2017, former player Ernesto Valverde was named as Luis Enrique's successor. On 20 September 2017, Barcelona issued a statement exercising their stance on the 2017 Catalan referendum saying, "FC Barcelona, in holding the utmost respect for its diverse body of members, will continue to support the will of the majority of Catalan people, and will do so in a civil, peaceful, and exemplary way". The match against Las Palmas on the referendum day was requested to be postponed by the Barcelona board due to heavy violence in Catalonia, but it (the request) was declined by La Liga, therefore being held behind closed doors. Two directors, Jordi Monés and Carles Vilarrubí, handed in their resignations in protest at the game's being played. Winning La Liga for the 2017–18 season, on 9 May 2018, Barcelona defeated Villarreal 5–1 to set the longest unbeaten streak (43 games) in La Liga history. On 27 April 2019, Barcelona won their 26th La Liga title. However, the La Liga title was overshadowed by an improbable Champions League exit to Liverpool in the semi-finals, with Barça losing the second leg 0–4 after being up 3–0 after a home victory.

On 13 January 2020, following the loss to Atlético Madrid in the Spanish Supercup, former Real Betis coach Quique Setién replaced Ernesto Valverde as the new head coach of Barcelona. Ultimately, Barcelona finished the season trophyless for first time in 12 years. On 17 August, the club confirmed that Setién had been removed from his position as manager, with director of football Eric Abidal also dismissed from his position. Two days later, Ronald Koeman was appointed as the new head coach of Barcelona. Rising dissatisfaction among supporters due to worsening finances and decline on the pitch in the previous season led to Josep Maria Bartomeu announcing his resignation as president on 27 October 2020, to avoid facing a vote of no confidence from the club members.

=== 2021–present: Return of Laporta and post-Messi era ===
On 7 March 2021, Joan Laporta was elected president of Barcelona with 54.28% of the vote. Barcelona won their 31st Copa del Rey, their only trophy under Ronald Koeman, after defeating Athletic Bilbao 4–0 in the final. In August 2021, Barcelona found themselves unable to comply with La Liga's Financial Fair Play requirements, and revealed a club debt of €1.35bn and a wage bill accounting for 103% of total income. Negotiations with Lionel Messi, now in the final year of his contract, had been ongoing for some time. However, on 5 August 2021, Barcelona announced that they would be unable to re-sign Messi to an extension due to La Liga regulations. This was despite the fact that the club and Messi had reached an agreement over the details of a new contract. Messi departed the club after 21 years as a Barça player, and the club's all-time leading goalscorer, and signed on a free transfer with French club Paris Saint-Germain. The financial implications also restricted Barcelona in the transfer market and as a result most of the incoming players were either free transfers or loans and they had to reduce players' wages to register the incoming players.

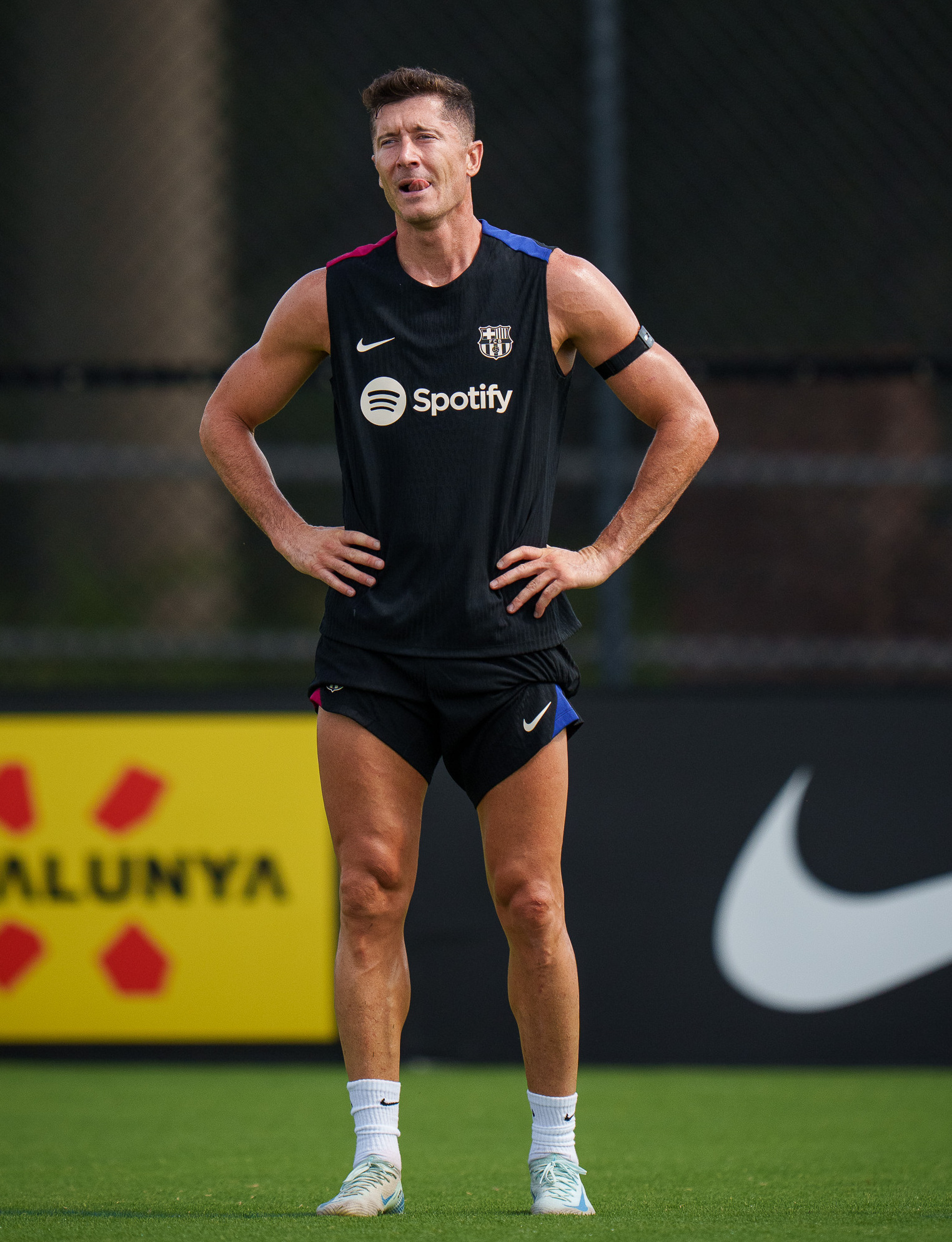
Robert Lewandowski joined the club in 2022. His arrival provided a veteran presence and clinical finishing that proved vital in Barcelona's return to domestic dominance.

Poor performances in La Liga and the Champions League led to the sacking of Ronald Koeman on 28 October 2021, with club legend Xavi replacing him. Xavi could not reverse the fortunes in the Champions League, and Barcelona dropped down to the Europa League for the first time since 2003–04, subsequently exiting in the quarter-finals. In the domestic league, Xavi improved Barça's form and guided them from ninth to second, guaranteeing a Champions League spot next season. However, this also meant Barcelona finished trophyless after earlier Supercopa and Copa del Rey exits.

On 15 January 2023, Xavi guided Barcelona to their first trophy since the 2021 Copa del Rey, as the Catalans defeated Real Madrid 3–1 in the Supercopa de España final. On 14 May 2023, Barcelona mathematically clinched their 27th league title with four games to spare, the first in the post-Messi era.

On 27 January 2024, after suffering a 5–3 loss at home to Villarreal, Xavi declared that he would resign at the end of the season. Even after a positive change during the mid-season and a retraction of his declaration in April, disputes within the team's board led to his dismissal on 24 May 2024. The season ended without any trophies for the team since they came in second place in the league and lost their chance of reaching the next round in Champions League after losing against Paris Saint-Germain 4–6 on aggregate in the quarter-final rounds. On 29 May 2024, the club appointed Hansi Flick as the new head coach, signing him to a two-year contract.

Under Flick's management in the 2024–25 season, Barcelona implemented a high-pressing, vertical style that saw a significant improvement in goal-scoring output, led by Robert Lewandowski and the emergence of Lamine Yamal. On 26 October 2024, Barcelona beat Real Madrid 4–0 in the Santiago Bernabéu. In the process, they broke Madrid's 42-game unbeaten streak in La Liga. On 15 May 2025, Barcelona won their 28th La Liga title against Espanyol, giving Flick his first major trophy at the club. Flick also won the Supercopa and Copa del Rey, beating rivals Real Madrid in both finals. The season also saw a successful run in the Champions League, where the team reached the semi-finals for the first time since 2019. Following a very successful season, Flick's contract was extended until 2027, and the club gave key players like Lamine Yamal and Raphinha new long-term contracts.

The 2025–26 season was marked by a return to full capacity at the newly refurbished Spotify Camp Nou, thus marking the end of a temporary period spent at the Estadi Olímpic Lluís Companys. On 18 January 2026, Barcelona won against Real Madrid 2–0 in Riyadh, clinching their first trophy, the Supercopa de España for the year. During the spring of 2026, the club would continue to rely on their youth academy, La Masia, despite financial difficulties and competition from rival clubs while remaining competitive at the top of the league table. On 2 February 2026, Barcelona suffered a heavy 4–0 loss against Atlético Madrid at the Wanda Metropolitano in the Copa del Rey. Although they won the return leg 3–0 at home, they were eliminated 4–3 on aggregate. On 15 March 2026, Joan Laporta was re-elected as president of Barcelona, securing a five-year mandate with 68.18% of the vote. Laporta defeated his only rival, Víctor Font, to remain in office until 2031. On 14 April 2026, Barcelona were eliminated from the Champions League quarter-finals again by Atlético Madrid, falling 3–2 on aggregate after a 2–0 first-leg deficit. On 10 May 2026, Barcelona secured their 29th La Liga title and their second consecutive under Flick, after defeating Real Madrid 2–0 at the Spotify Camp Nou.

== Support ==
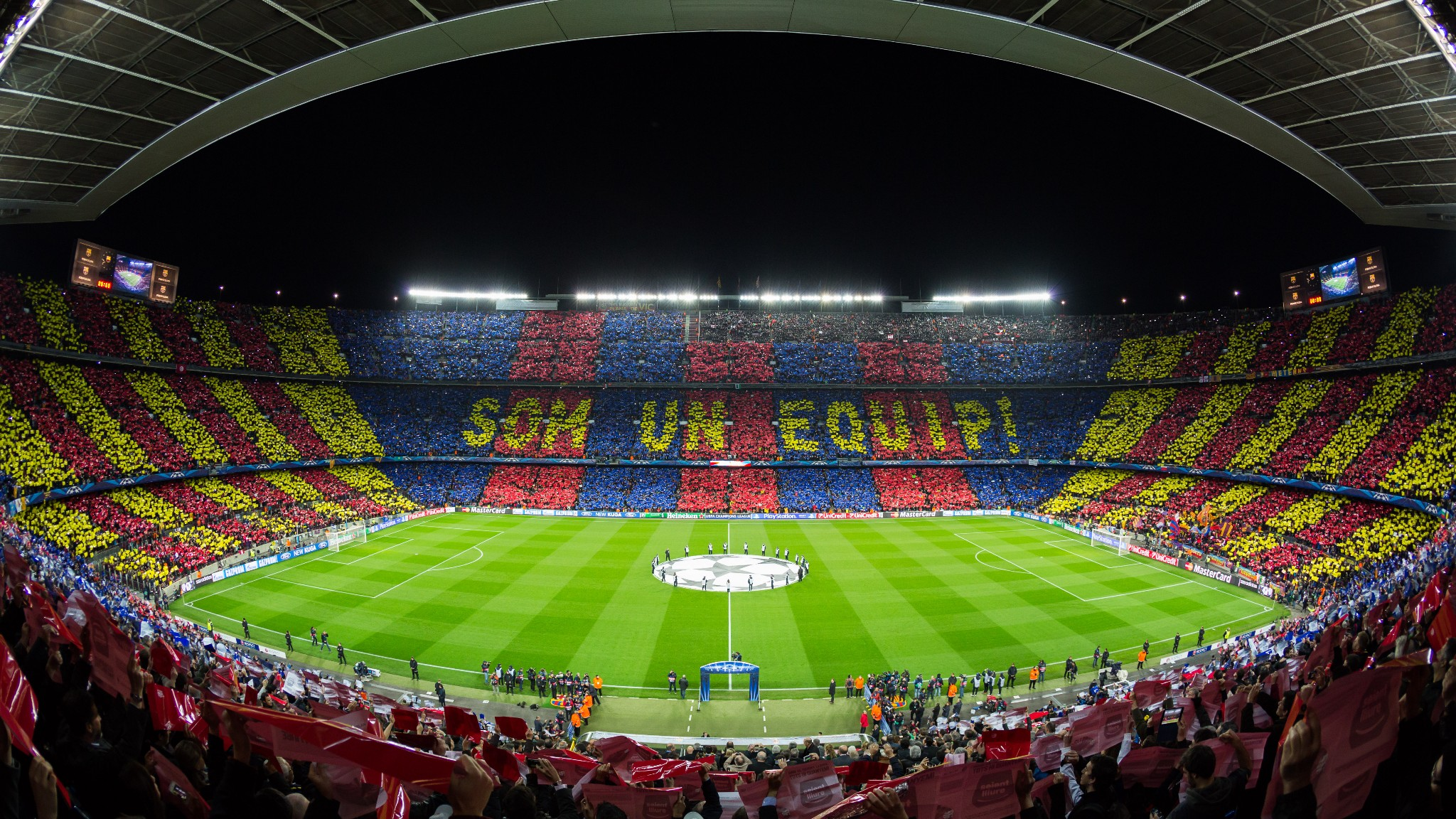
Tifo at Camp Nou in a 2013 comeback against AC Milan

The nickname culer for a Barcelona supporter is derived from the Catalan cul (English: arse), as the spectators at the first stadium, Camp de la Indústria, sat with their culs over the stand. In Spain, about 25% of the population is said to be Barça sympathisers, second behind Real Madrid, supported by 32% of the population. Throughout Europe, Barcelona is the favourite second-choice club. The club's membership figures have seen a significant increase from 100,000 in the 2003–04 season to 170,000 in September 2009, the sharp rise being attributed to the influence of Ronaldinho and then-president Joan Laporta's media strategy that focused on Spanish and English online media. As of 31 May 2023, the club has 150,317 memberships, called socis.

In addition to membership, as of March 2022 there are 1,264 officially registered fan clubs, called penyes, around the world. The fan clubs promote Barcelona in their locality and receive beneficial offers when visiting Barcelona. Among the best supported teams globally, Barcelona has the second highest social media following in the world among sports teams, with over 103 million Facebook fans as of December 2021, only behind Real Madrid with 111 million. The club has had many prominent people among its supporters, including Pope John Paul II, who was an honorary member, and former prime minister of Spain José Luis Rodríguez Zapatero.

== Club rivalries ==
=== El Clásico ===
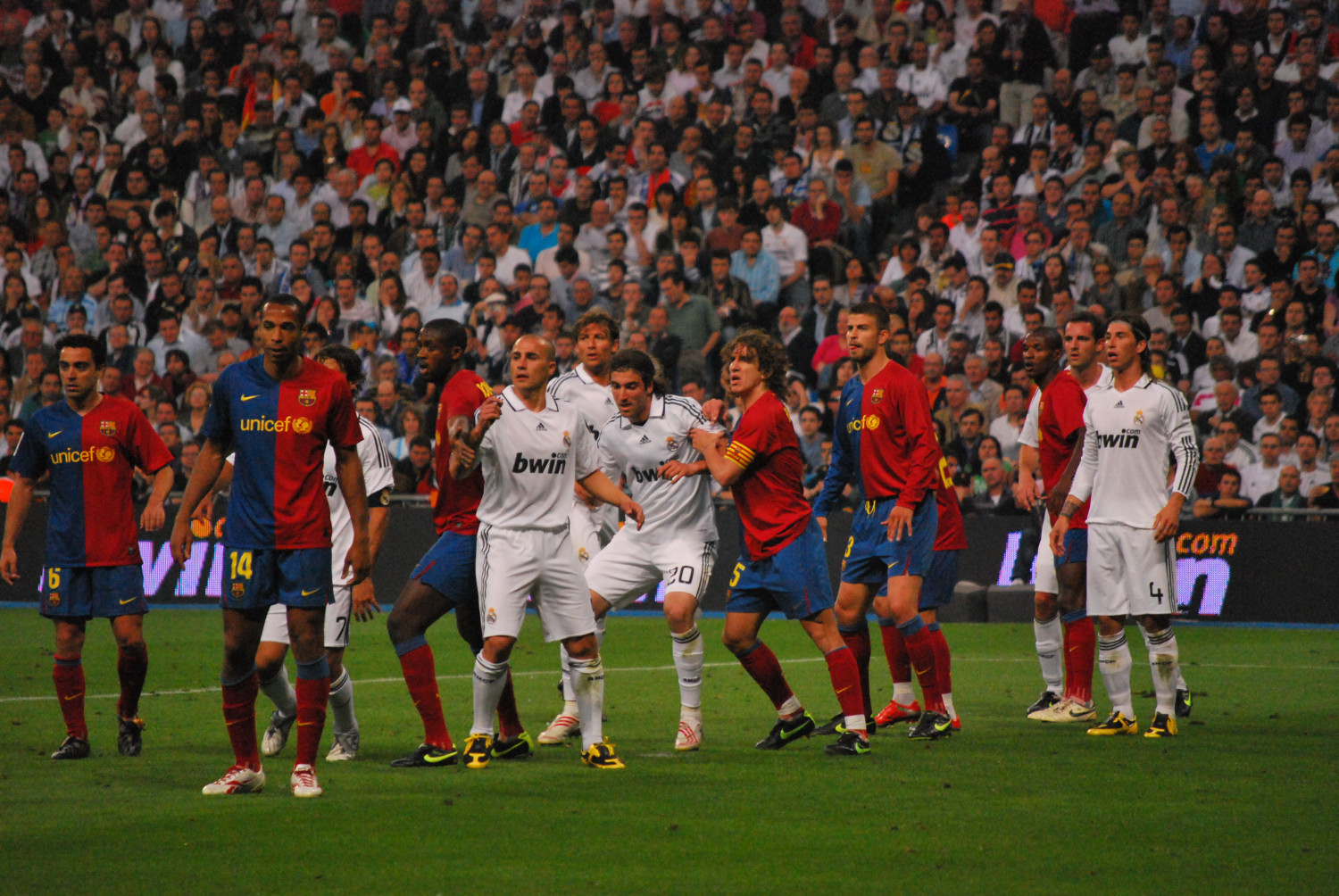
Players jostle in Barcelona's 2–6 win against Real Madrid at the Santiago Bernabéu Stadium in a 2009 El Clásico.

There is often a fierce rivalry between the two strongest teams in a national league, and this is particularly the case in La Liga, where the game between Barcelona and Real Madrid is known as "The Classic" (El Clásico). From the start of national competitions the clubs were seen as representatives of two rival regions in Spain: Catalonia and Castile, as well as of the two cities. The rivalry reflects what many regard as the political and cultural tensions felt between Catalans and the Castilians, seen by one author as a re-enactment of the Spanish Civil War. As of May 2026, Real Madrid and Barcelona had met 264 times in competitive matches, with each club recording 106 victories and 52 matches ending in draws.

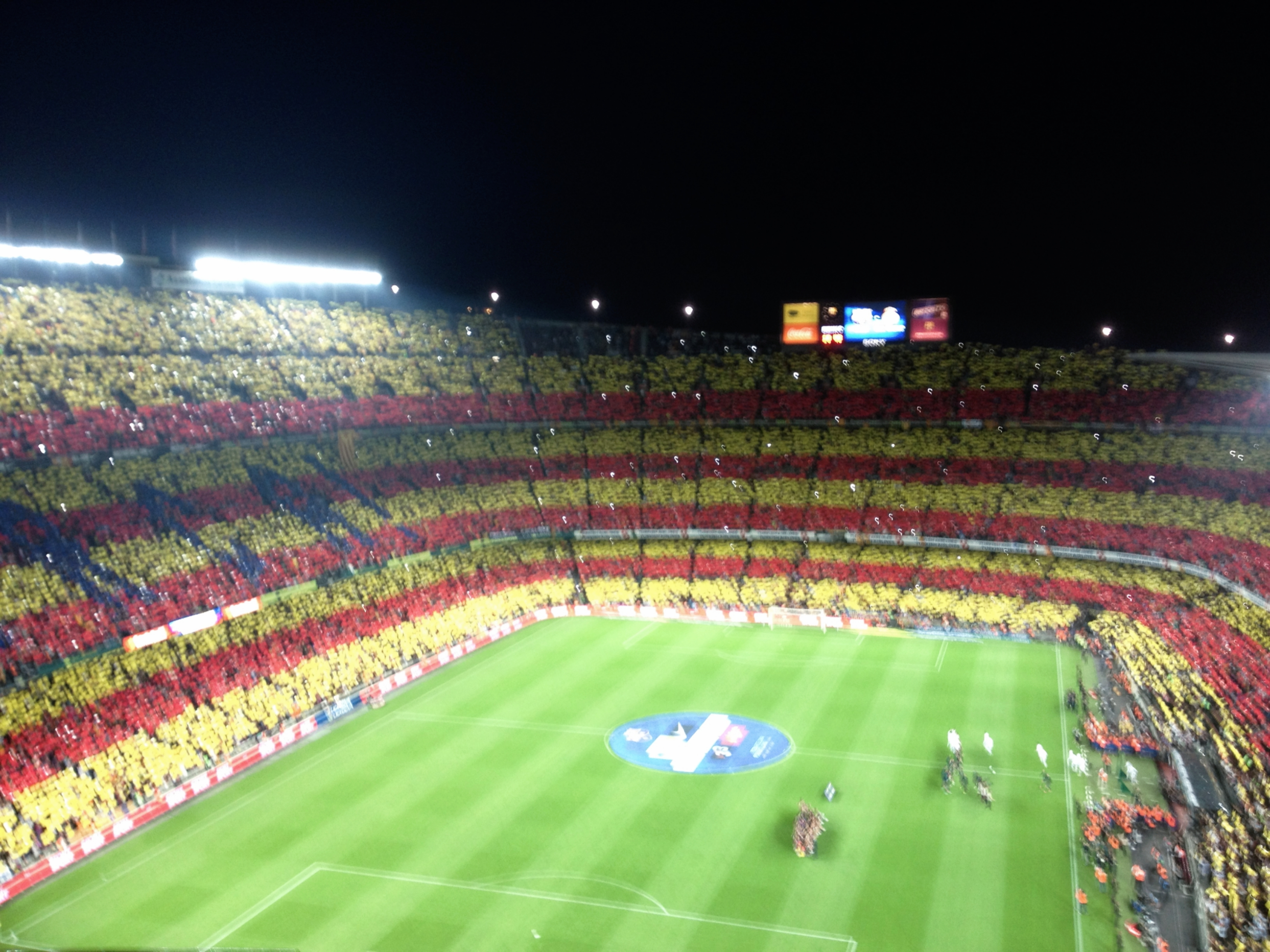
Barcelona fans creating a mosaic of the Catalan flag before a 2012 El Clásico at Camp Nou

As early as the 1930s, Barcelona "had developed a reputation as a symbol of Catalan identity, opposed to the centralising tendencies of Madrid". In 1936, when Francisco Franco started the Coup d'état against the democratic Second Spanish Republic, the president of Barcelona, Josep Sunyol, member of the Republican Left of Catalonia and Deputy to The Cortes, was arrested and executed without trial by Franco's troops (Sunyol was exercising his political activities, visiting Republican troops north of Madrid). During the dictatorships of Miguel Primo de Rivera and especially Francisco Franco, all regional languages and identities in Spain were frowned upon and restrained. As such, most citizens of Barcelona were in strong opposition to the fascist-like regime. In this period, Barcelona gained their motto Més que un club (English: More than a club) because of its alleged connection to Catalan nationalist as well as to progressive beliefs.

There's an ongoing controversy as to what extent Franco's rule (1939–75) influenced the activities and on-pitch results of both Barcelona and Real Madrid. Fans of both clubs tend to exaggerate the myths favouring their narratives. Most historians agree than Franco did not have a preferred football team, but his Spanish nationalist beliefs led him to associate himself with the establishment teams, such as Atlético Aviación and Madrid FC (that recovered its royal name after the fall of the Republic). On the other hand, he also wanted the renamed CF Barcelona succeed as "Spanish team" rather than a Catalan one. During the early years of Franco's rule, Real Madrid were not particularly successful, winning two Copa del Generalísimo titles and a Copa Eva Duarte; Barcelona claimed three league titles, one Copa del Generalísimo and one Copa Eva Duarte. During that period, Atlético Aviación were believed to be the preferred team over Real Madrid. The most contested stories of the period include Real Madrid's 11–1 home win against Barcelona in the Copa del Generalísimo, where the Catalan team alleged intimidation, and the controversial transfer of Alfredo Di Stéfano to Real Madrid despite his agreement with Barcelona. The latter transfer was part of Real Madrid chairman Santiago Bernabéu's "revolution" that ushered in the era of unprecedented dominance. Bernabéu, himself a veteran of the Civil War who fought for Franco's forces, saw Real Madrid on top not only of Spanish but also European football, helping create the European Cup, the first true competition for Europe's best club sides. His vision was fulfilled when Real Madrid not only started winning consecutive league titles but also swept the first five editions of the European Cup in the 1950s. These events had a profound impact on Spanish football and influenced Franco's attitude. According to historians, during this time he realized the importance of Real Madrid for his regime's international image, and the club became his preferred team until his death. Fernando Maria Castiella, who served as Minister of Foreign Affairs under Franco from 1957 until 1969, noted that "[Real Madrid] is the best embassy we have ever had." Franco died in 1975, and the Spanish transition to democracy soon followed. Under his rule, Real Madrid had won 14 league titles, 6 Copa del Generalísimo titles, 1 Copa Eva Duarte, 6 European Cups, 2 Latin Cups, and 1 Intercontinental Cup. In the same period, Barcelona had won 8 league titles, 9 Copa del Generalísimo titles, 3 Copa Eva Duarte titles, 3 Inter-Cities Fairs Cups, and 2 Latin Cups.

The rivalry was intensified during the 1950s when the clubs disputed the signing of Alfredo Di Stéfano. Di Stéfano had impressed both Barcelona and Real Madrid while playing for Los Millionarios in Bogotá, Colombia, during a players' strike in his native Argentina. Soon after Millonarios' return to Colombia, Barcelona directors visited Buenos Aires and agreed with River Plate, the last FIFA-affiliated team to have held Di Stéfano's rights, for his transfer in 1954 for the equivalent of 150 million Italian lira (according to other sources 200,000 dollars). This started a battle between the two Spanish rivals for his rights. FIFA appointed Armando Muñoz Calero, former president of the Spanish Football Federation as mediator. Calero decided to let Di Stéfano play the 1953–54 and 1955–56 seasons in Madrid, and the 1954–55 and 1956–57 seasons in Barcelona. The agreement was approved by the Football Association and their respective clubs. Although the Catalans agreed, the decision created various discontent among the Blaugrana members and the president was forced to resign in September 1953. Barcelona sold Madrid their half-share, and Di Stéfano moved to Los Blancos, signing a four-year contract. Real paid 5.5 million Spanish pesetas for the transfer, plus a 1.3 million bonus for the purchase, an annual fee to be paid to the Millonarios, and a 16,000 salary for Di Stéfano with a bonus double that of his teammates, for a total of 40% of the annual revenue of the Madrid club.

Di Stéfano became integral in the subsequent success achieved by Real Madrid, scoring twice in his first game against Barcelona. With him, Madrid won the first five editions of the European Cup. The 1960s saw the rivalry reach the European stage when Real Madrid and Barcelona met twice in the European Cup, with Madrid triumphing en route to their fifth consecutive title in 1959–60 and Barcelona prevailing en route to losing the final in 1960–61. In 2002, the European encounter between the clubs was dubbed the "Match of The Century" by Spanish media, and Madrid's win was watched by more than 500 million people. An intense fixture which is marked by its indiscipline in addition to memorable goal celebrations from both teams – often involving mocking the opposition – such notable celebrations occurred in 2009 when Barcelona captain Carles Puyol kissed his Catalan armband in front of incensed Madrid fans at the Santiago Bernabéu Stadium and in 2017 when Lionel Messi celebrated his 93rd-minute winner for Barcelona against Real Madrid at the Bernabéu by taking off his Barcelona shirt and holding it up to incensed Real Madrid fans – with his name and number facing them.

=== El derbi Barceloní ===
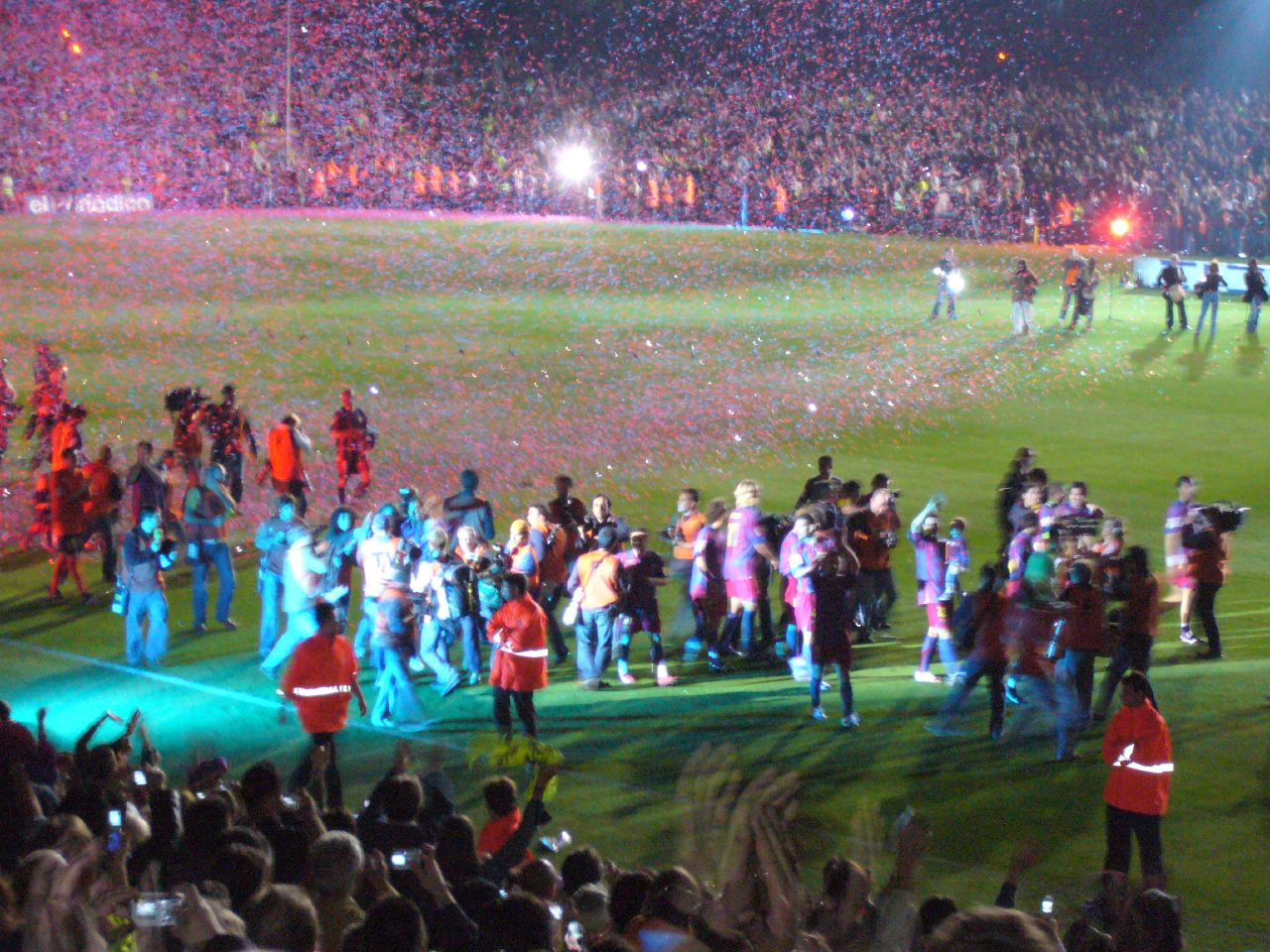
Barcelona players parade La Liga trophy around Camp Nou in May 2006 after defeating Espanyol in their last home game of the season.

Barça's local rival has always been Espanyol. Blanc-i-blaus, being one of the clubs granted royal patronage, was founded exclusively by Spanish football fans, unlike the multinational nature of Barça's primary board. The founding message of the club was clearly anti-Barcelona, and they disapprovingly saw FC Barcelona as a team of foreigners. The rivalry was strengthened by what Catalonians saw as a provocative representative of Madrid. Their original ground was in the affluent district of Sarrià.

Traditionally, Espanyol was seen by the vast majority of Barcelona's citizens as a club which cultivated a kind of compliance to the central authority, in stark contrast to Barça's revolutionary spirit. Also in the 1960s and 1970s, while FC Barcelona acted as an integrating force for Catalonia's new arrivals from poorer regions of Spain expecting to find a better life, Espanyol drew their support mainly from sectors close to the regime such as policemen, military officers, civil servants and career fascists.

In 1918, Espanyol started a counter-petition against autonomy, which at that time had become a pertinent issue. Later on, an Espanyol supporter group would join the Falangists in the Spanish Civil War, siding with the fascists. Despite these differences in ideology, the derbi has always been more relevant to Espanyol supporters than Barcelona ones due to the difference in objectives. In recent years the rivalry has become less political, as Espanyol translated its official name and anthem from Spanish to Catalan.

Though it is the most played local derby in the history of La Liga, it is also the most unbalanced, with Barcelona overwhelmingly dominant. In the primera división league table, Espanyol has only managed to end above Barça on three occasions from 87 seasons (1928–2022) and the only all-Catalan Copa del Rey final was won by Barça in 1957. Espanyol has the consolation of achieving the largest margin win with a 6–0 in 1951, while Barcelona's biggest win was 5–0 on seven occasions (in 1933, 1947, 1964, 1975, 1992, 2016 and 2017). Espanyol achieved a 2–1 win against Barça during the 2008–09 season, becoming the first team to defeat Barcelona at Camp Nou in their treble-winning season.

=== Rivalry with AC Milan ===
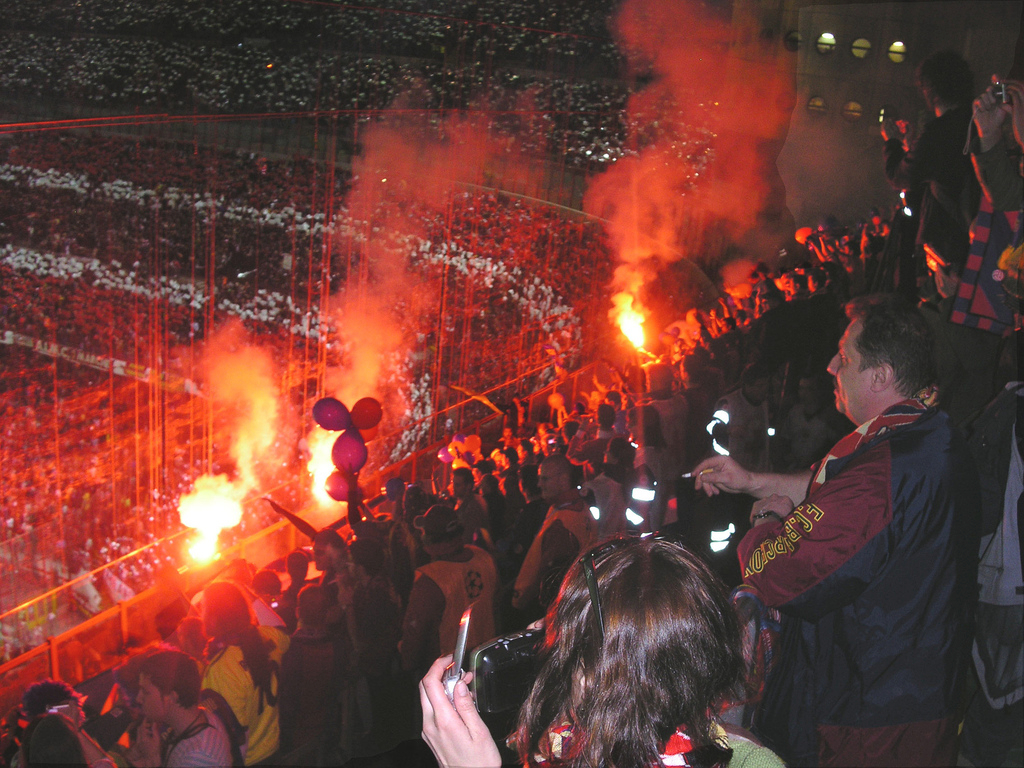
Barcelona's ultras Boixos Nois in the 2005–06 UEFA Champions League semi-final against AC Milan at San Siro

One of Barcelona's rivals in European football is Italian club AC Milan. The team against which Barcelona has played the most matches (19), it is also the third most played match in European club competitions, behind Real Madrid–Juventus (21) and Real Madrid–Bayern Munich (26). Two of the most successful clubs in Europe, Milan has won seven European Cups to Barça's five, while both clubs have won a record five European Super Cups. Barcelona and Milan have won other continental titles, which make them the second and third most decorated teams in world football, with 19 and 14 titles respectively, both behind Real Madrid's 23.

Barcelona leads the head-to-head record with eight wins and five defeats. The first encounter between the two clubs was in the 1959–60 European Cup. They faced off in the round of 16 and Barça won the tie on a 7–1 aggregate score (0–2 in Milan and 5–1 in Barcelona). While Milan had never knocked Barcelona out of the European Cup, they beat Johan Cruyff's Dream Team 4–0 in the 1994 Champions League final, despite being the underdogs. In 2013, however, Barcelona made a "historic" comeback from a 0–2 first leg defeat in the round of 16 of the 2012–13 Champions League, winning 4–0 at Camp Nou.

== Ownership and finances ==
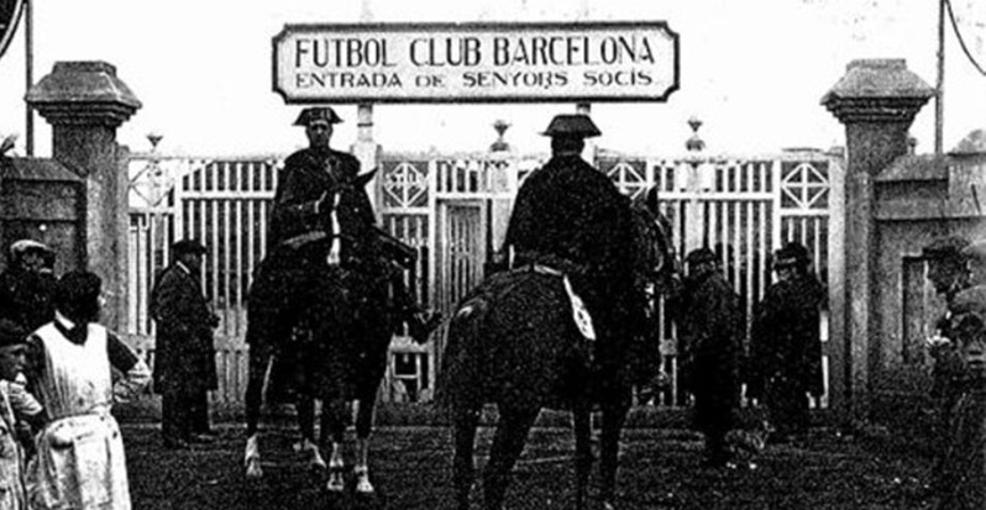
Civil Guards at the socis' entrance of the Camp de la Indústria (early 20th century)

Along with Real Madrid, Athletic Bilbao, and Osasuna, Barcelona is organised as a registered association. Unlike a limited company, it is not possible to purchase shares in the club, but only membership. The members of Barcelona, called socis, form an assembly of delegates which is the highest governing body of the club. As of 31 May 2023, the club has 150,317 socis.

In 2010, Forbes evaluated Barcelona's worth to be around €752 million (US$1 billion), ranking them fourth after Manchester United, Real Madrid and Arsenal, based on figures from the 2008–09 season. According to Deloitte, Barcelona had a recorded revenue of €366 million in the same period, ranking second to Real Madrid, who generated €401 million in revenue. In 2013, Forbes magazine ranked Barcelona the third most valuable sports team in the world, behind Real Madrid and Manchester United, with a value of $2.6 billion. In 2014, Forbes ranked them the second most valuable sports team in the world, worth $3.2 billion, and Deloitte ranked them the world's fourth richest football club in terms of revenue, with an annual turnover of €484.6 million. In 2017, Forbes ranked them the fourth most valuable sports team in the world with a team value of $3.64 billion. In 2018, Barcelona became the first sports team to surpass $1bn in annual revenues. In November 2018 Barcelona became the first sports team with average first-team pay in excess of £10m ($13.8m) per year. However, years of profligate spending under the leadership of Josep Maria Bartomeu (president between 2014 and 2020) and other factors, such as the COVID-19 pandemic, saw the club's gross debt rise to about $1.4 billion in 2021, much of it short-term.

On November 9, 2024, Barcelona announced its new sponsorship deal with Nike. It is said that it is the highest deal in football history.

== In popular culture ==
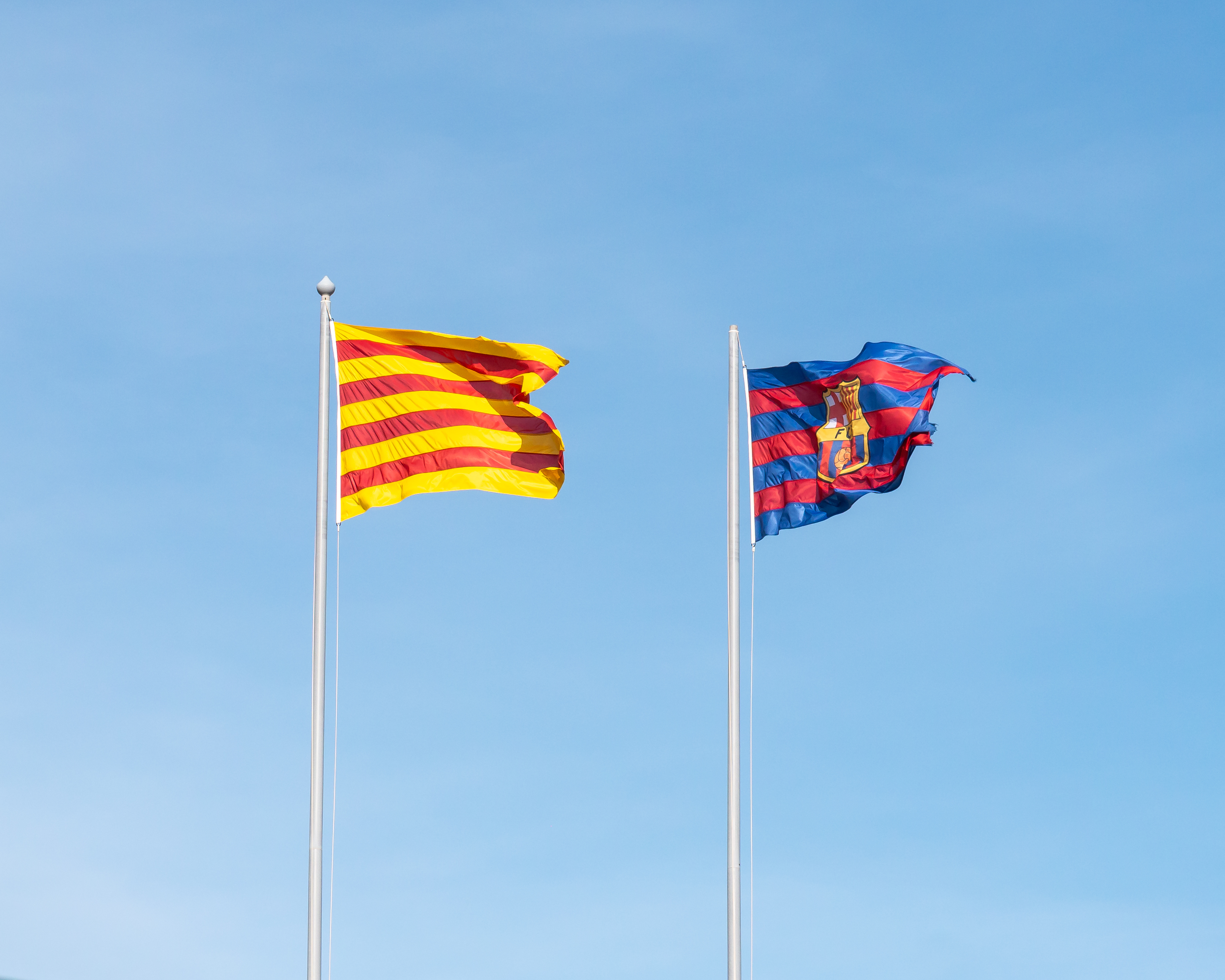
The club's colors being flown alongside the Senyera.

Since its origins, Barcelona has had a close relationship with the world of culture, especially, with Catalan culture. The club's statutes from 1932 already said that Barça "is an association of a cultural and sporting nature". The club and its players have been a source of inspiration for writers, musicians, visual artists, journalists, cartoonists, theatre, and film people.

In literature, some great Catalan writers they were inspired by the club. In 1957, on the occasion of the inauguration of the Camp Nou, Josep Maria de Sagarra dedicated a poem titled Blau i grana. Poet Manuel Vázquez Montalbán wrote regularly about his vision of the team. Some expressions emerged that caught on in the popular imagination, such as identifying Barça with "The unarmed army of Catalonia." He also wrote that "Barça is the only legal institution that unites the man on the street with the Catalonia that could have been and was not."

The great anniversaries have been favorable occasions for the club to involve great Catalan figures from the cultural world in its activities. Names such as Josep Segrelles, Joan Miró and Antoni Tàpies have signed commemorative posters, just as Jaume Picas and the writer Josep Maria Espinàs, on the occasion of the club's 75th anniversary, wrote the lyrics for "Cant del Barça", the current anthem, with music by Manuel Valls.

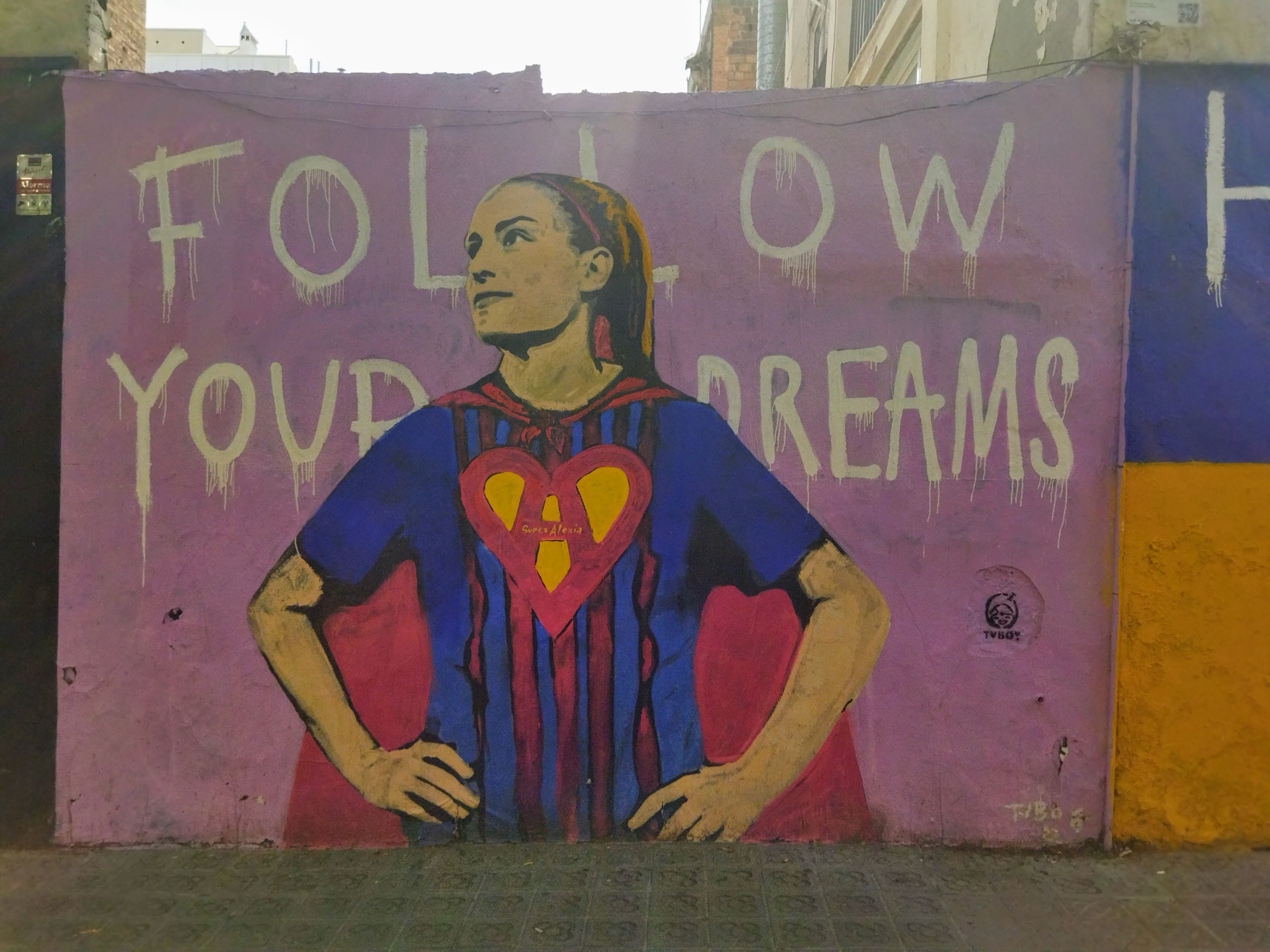
Follow my dreams mural by Italian street artist TVBoy, this mural features Barcelona Femení player Alexia Putellas

The Blaugrana world has also been a source of inspiration in the plastic arts, with names such as Jordi Alumà, Josep Maria Subirachs, Antoni Tàpies or Josep Viladomat, who made the "Avi del Barça" sculpture in the La Masia. Salvador Dalí paid tribute to the club's 75th anniversary with an etching.

In performing arts, music has also been present, from the tango that Gardel dedicated to Samitier to the songs of Joan Manuel Serrat, La Trinca and many others. Theatre has also been a good way to express the feelings of Barça fans, from the El Paralelo cuplés from before the Civil War or skits like 'El Partido del Domingo', by Castaños, to more recent texts, like El culékulé, by Xavier Bosch.

In times of political difficulty or lack of freedoms, Barça has been a refuge and means of expression for cultural and artistic activities. In 2013, the club highlighted the 'Barça Cultura' plan, an initiative that promotes the area of institutional relations and protocol with the aim of offering Barcelona as a platform to promote culture in Catalonia. In 2022, Barcelona and Òmnium signed an agreement to promote the Catalan language, culture and the country.

There are many documentaries and films that have been created throughout history to capture the successes and journey of the club over the years. More recently, in December 2022, Amazon Prime Video released a five-episode docuseries called FC Barcelona: A New Era. It documented the club by spending time with the coaching staff and players behind the scenes both on and off the field throughout their 2021–22 season. In September 2023, Amazon Prime Video launched the second season with a five-episode docuseries. It focuses on their 2022–23 behind the scenes season.

== Records ==
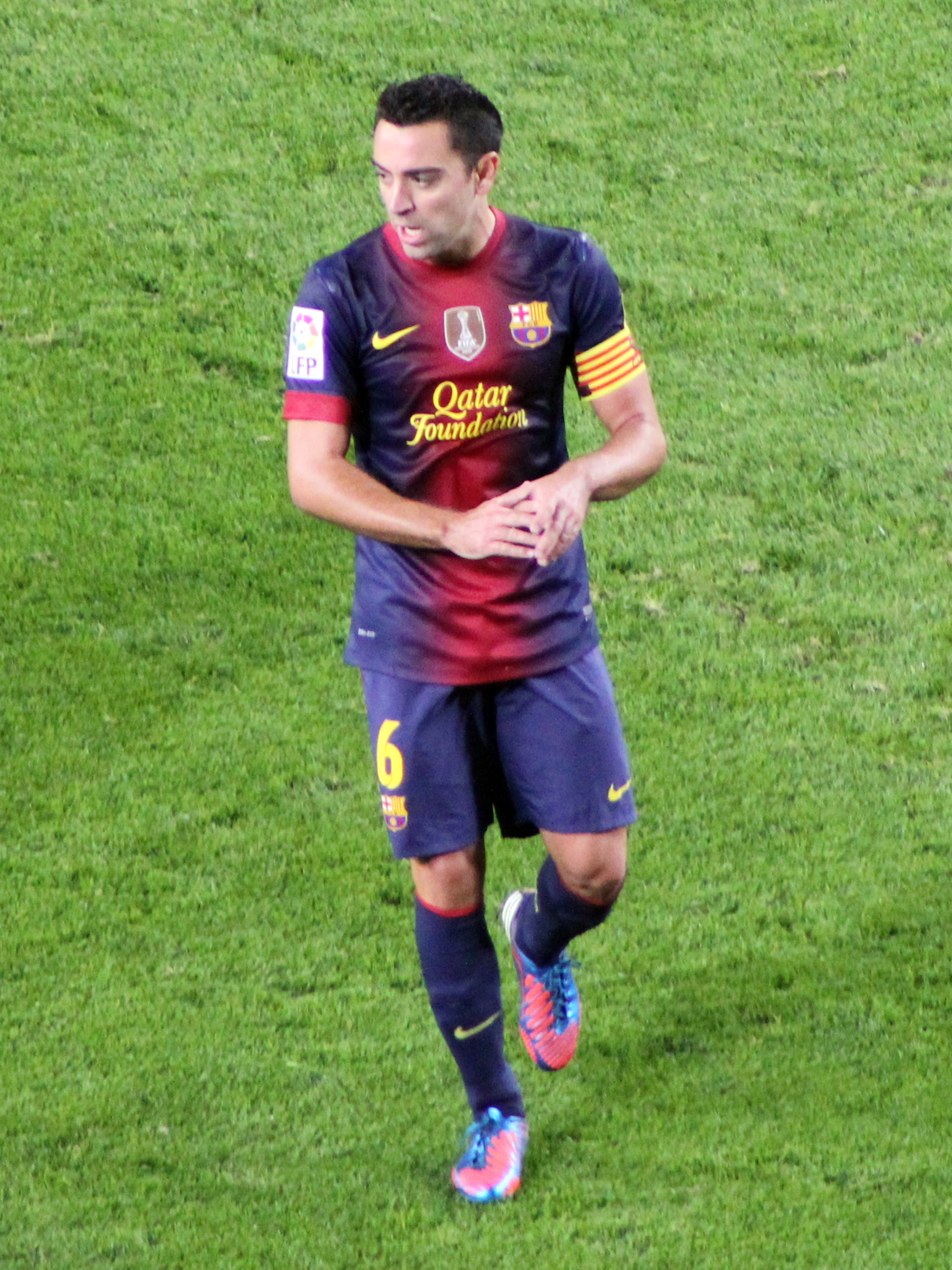
Xavi made 767 total appearances for Barcelona, a former club record.

In March 2021, Lionel Messi overtook Xavi's record of 767 games played for the club, and presently has made 778 official appearances in all competitions, while also holding the record for the most appearances in La Liga matches for Barcelona, with 520.

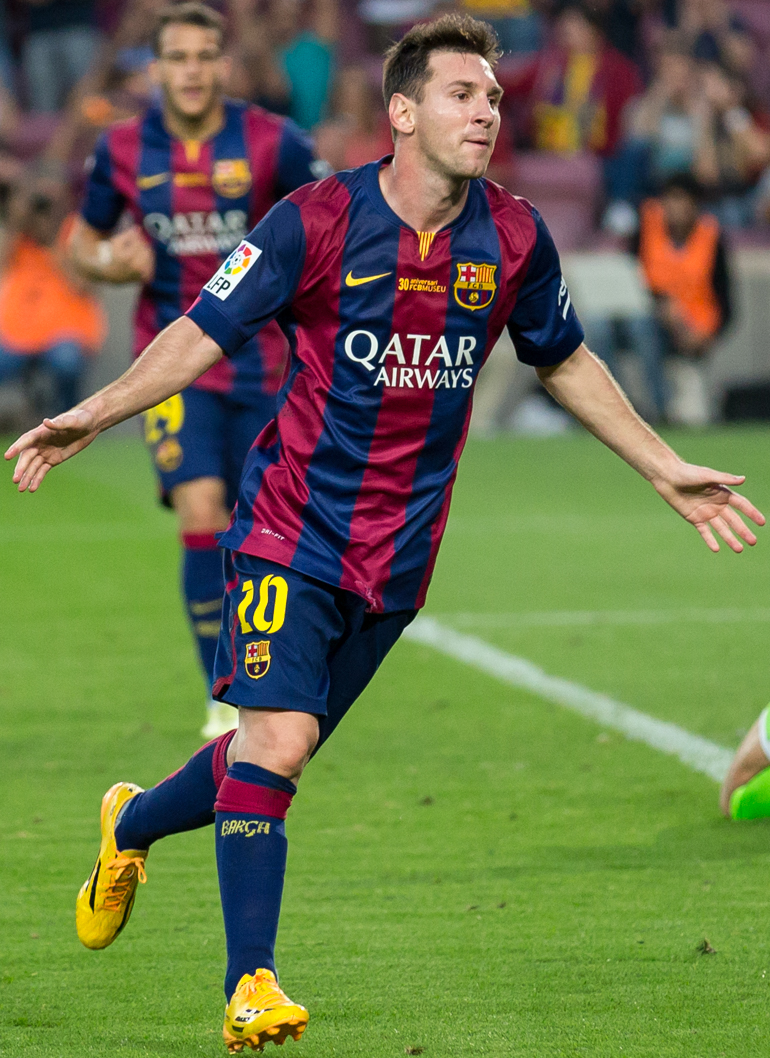
Lionel Messi is Barcelona's all-time top appearance maker, top scorer, and the highest scoring player for a single club.

Barcelona's all-time highest goalscorer in official competitions is Lionel Messi with 672 goals, surpassing César Rodríguez's 232 goals in March 2012, a record which stood for 60 years. In December 2020, Messi also overtook Pelé's 643 goals for Santos to become the highest official scorer for a single club. Messi is the record goalscorer for Barcelona in European and international club competitions, and the record league scorer with 474 goals in La Liga. Four other players have managed to score over 100 league goals for Barcelona: César Rodríguez (190), Luis Suárez (147), László Kubala (131) and Samuel Eto'o (108). Josep Samitier is the club's highest goalscorer in the Copa del Rey, with 64 goals.

László Kubala holds the La Liga record for most goals scored in one match, with seven goals against Sporting Gijón in 1952. Lionel Messi co-holds the Champions League record with five goals against Bayer Leverkusen in 2012. Eulogio Martínez became Barça's top goalscorer in a cup game, when he scored seven goals against Atlético Madrid in 1957.

Barcelona goalkeepers have won a record number of Zamora trophies (20), with Antoni Ramallets and Víctor Valdés winning a record five each. Valdés had a ratio of 0.832 goals-conceded-per-game, a La Liga record, and he also holds the record for longest period without conceding a goal (896 minutes) in all competitions for Barcelona. Claudio Bravo has the record of best unbeaten start in a season in La Liga history, at 754 minutes.

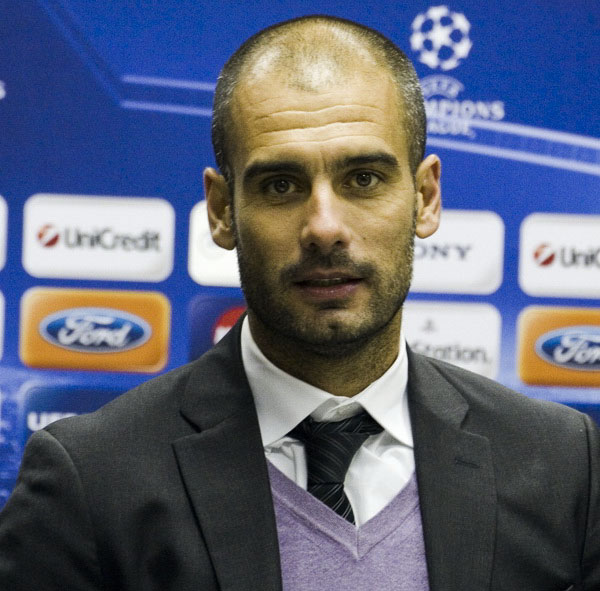
Pep Guardiola is Barcelona's most successful coach, with 14 trophies.

Barcelona's longest serving manager is Jack Greenwell, with nine years in two spells (1917–1924) and (1931–1933), and Pep Guardiola is the club's most successful manager (14 trophies in 4 years). The most successful Barcelona player is Lionel Messi with 35 trophies, surpassing Andrés Iniesta, with 32 trophies.

Barcelona's Camp Nou is the largest stadium in Europe. The club's highest home attendance was 120,000 in a European Cup quarter-final against Juventus on 3 March 1986. The modernisation of the Camp Nou during the 1990s and the introduction of all-seater stands means the record will not be broken for the foreseeable future, as the capacity of the stadium was 99,354 before 2023, and is expected to reach 105,000 in 2027.

El Barça de les Cinc Copes is the first team in Spanish football to have won five trophies in a single season (1951–1952). Barcelona is the only club to have played in every season of European competitions since they started in 1955 counting non-UEFA competition Inter-Cities Fairs Cup. On 18 December 2009, alongside being the only Spanish club to achieve a continental treble, Barcelona became the first ever European football team to win six trophies in a calendar year (Sextuple). In January 2018, Barcelona signed Philippe Coutinho from Liverpool for €120 million, the highest transfer fee in club's history. In August 2017, Barcelona player Neymar transferred to Paris Saint-Germain for a world record transfer fee of €222 million.

In 2016, Barcelona's La Masia was ranked second by the International Centre for Sports Studies (CIES) as the most top-level players producing academy in the top five leagues, having ranked first in 2015.

== Kits and crest ==
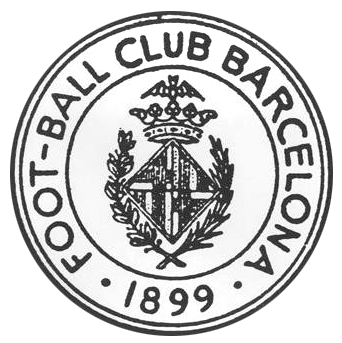
The first crest (left) worn by Barça from 1899 to 1910, and second crest (right), designed by Carles Comamala in 1910.

The club's original crest was a quartered diamond-shaped crest topped by the Crown of Aragon and the bat of King James, and surrounded by two branches, one of a laurel tree and the other a palm. The club shared Barcelona's coat of arms, as a demonstration of its identification with the city and a desire to be recognised as one. In 1910, the club held a competition among its members to design a new crest. The winner was Carles Comamala, who at the time played for the club. Comamala's suggestion became the crest that the club wears today, with some minor variations. The crest consists of the St George Cross in the upper-left corner with the Catalan flag beside it, and the team colours at the bottom.

The blue and garnet colours of the shirt were first worn in a match against Hispania in 1900. Several competing theories have been put forth for the blue and garnet design of the Barcelona shirt. The son of the first president, Arthur Witty, claimed it was the idea of his father as the colours were the same as the Merchant Taylor's School team. Another explanation, according to author Toni Strubell, is that the colours are from Robespierre's First Republic. In Catalonia the common perception is that the colours were chosen by Joan Gamper and are those of his home team, Basel.

1899–1910 (Note: The first kit worn by the club in 1899. In the 1999–2000 season, a similar model was worn to commemorate the 100th anniversary of the club and 2024–25 season with an original model.)	1910–present (Note: Traditional Barcelona uniform.)	2015–16 (Note: The club used horizontal stripes during the 2015–16 season.)	2019–20 (Note: The club used a checkered design during the 2019–20 season.)	2021–22 (Note: The club used halved shorts and a crest-inspired shirt during the 2021–22 season.)

=== Kit suppliers and shirt sponsors ===
Since 1998, the club has had a kit deal with Nike. In 2016, the deal was renewed until 2028 for a record €155 million per year. The contract includes a clause sanctioning penalty or agreement termination anytime if Barcelona fail to qualify for the European competitions or is relegated from La Liga. In 2023, Barcelona became the revenue leader from the sale of kits and merchandising in Europe with a turnover of €179 million.

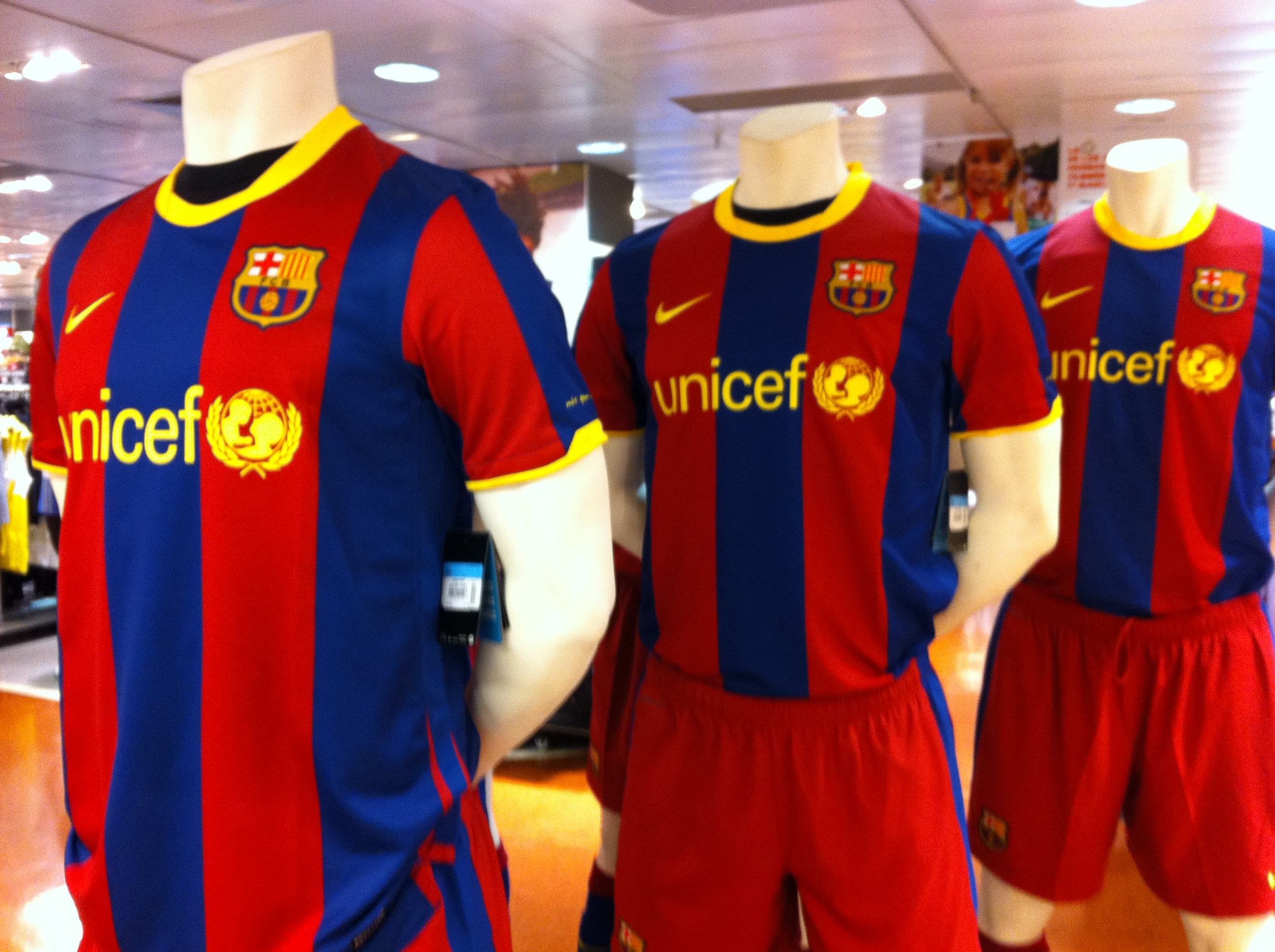
Nike has been Barcelona's official kit supplier since 1998.

Although Spanish clubs first began displaying sponsor names on their shirts in 1981, Barcelona held off having a name across the front of the shirt until 2006, when the club signed an agreement to have UNICEF's name on their front. Unlike traditional deals, this was not to have paying money to the club, but instead to have the club raise money for UNICEF. In 2011, the club signed its first commercial shirt sponsorship deal, when it reached an agreement with Qatar Foundation.

Period	Kit manufacturer	Shirt main sponsor	Shirt sub sponsor(s)
1899–1982	None	None	None
1982–1992	Meyba	None	None
1992–1998	Kappa	None	None
1998–2003	Nike	None	None
2003–2004	Nike	None	Forum (left sleeve)
2004–2006	Nike	None	TV3 (left sleeve)
2006–2011	Nike	UNICEF	TV3 (left sleeve)
2011–2013	Nike	Qatar Foundation	TV3 (left sleeve) & UNICEF (back shirt)
2013–2014	Nike	Qatar Airways (€33,5m/year)	UNICEF (back shirt)
2014–2017	Nike	Qatar Airways (€33,5m/year)	Beko (left sleeve) & UNICEF (back shirt)
2017–2021	Nike	Rakuten (€55m/year)	Beko (left sleeve) & UNICEF (back shirt)
2021–2022	Nike	Rakuten (€55m/year)	UNICEF (back shirt)
2022–2023	Nike	Spotify	UNHCR (back shirt)
2023–2026	Nike	Spotify	AMBILIGHT TV (left sleeve) & UNHCR (back shirt)
2026–	Nike	Spotify	Midea (left sleeve) & Barça Foundation (back shirt)

== Anthems ==
Throughout its history, the club has had various official songs. The anthem in use today is "Cant del Barça" (The Song of Barça), composed in 1974 on the occasion of the club's 75th anniversary. Authors Josep Maria Espinàs and Jaume Picas i Guiu composed the lyrics in Catalan, while the music was composed by Manuel Valls.

The song was first performed on 27 November 1974 at the Camp Nou before the match between Barcelona and the East Germany national team by a 3,500-man choir led by Oriol Martorell. On November 28, 1988, in celebration of the club's centenary, the song was performed by Catalan singer-songwriter Joan Manuel Serrat at the end of the festival at Camp Nou. Since the 2008–09 season, the Cant del Barça has been featured on the official Barcelona jerseys.

On the occasion of the club's 124th anniversary and with the start of preparations for the 125th anniversary, the club presented a new anthem version recording faithful to the essence of the original score and lyrics composed in 1974, with a better quality and enhanced orchestration and vocals. Composed by the Vallès Symphony Orchestra, the Orfeó Català choral society and the Cor Jove youth choir, it is the current official version.

The Cant del Barça is played before Barcelona games take place at the Camp Nou, especially during matches against Real Madrid and just before the start of the match. The song is also often played for supporters and fans to cheer, chant and celebrate the victory.

== Stadium ==
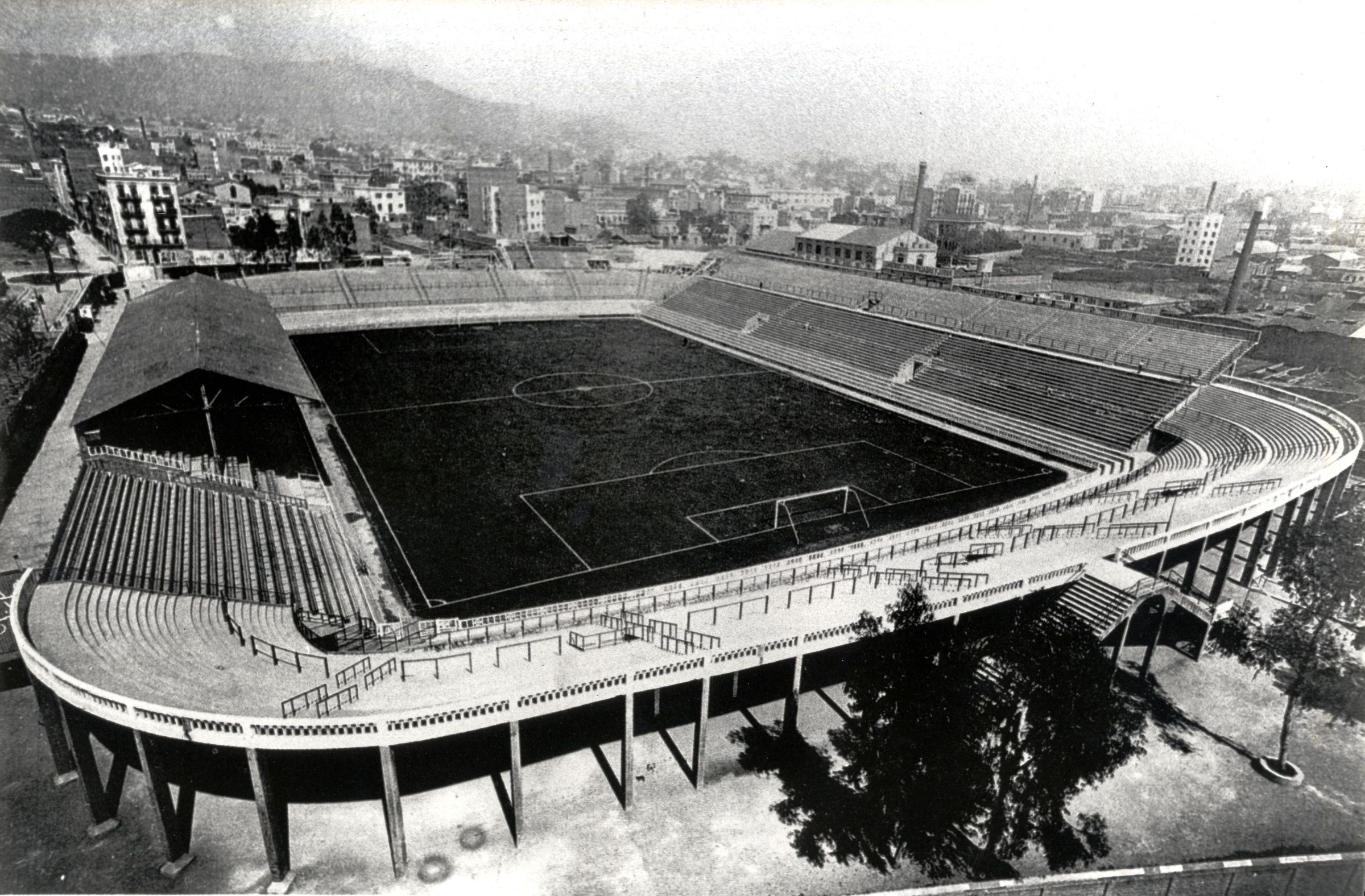
Camp de Les Corts in 1939. It was the home stadium for Barcelona until the club moved to the Camp Nou in 1957.

Barcelona initially played on different fields, one of the first to represent a fixed venue was the Camp de la Indústria. The capacity was about 6,000, and club officials deemed the facilities inadequate for a club with growing membership.

In 1922, the number of supporters had surpassed 20,000 and by lending money to the club, Barça was able to build the larger Camp de Les Corts, which had an initial capacity of 20,000 spectators. After the Spanish Civil War, the club started attracting more members and a larger number of spectators at matches. This led to several expansion projects: the grandstand in 1944, the southern stand in 1946, and finally the northern stand in 1950. After the last expansion, Les Corts could hold 60,000 spectators.

After the construction was complete, there was no further room for expansion at Les Corts. Back-to-back La Liga titles in 1948 and 1949 and the signing of László Kubala in June 1950, who would later go on to score 196 goals in 256 matches, drew larger crowds to the games. The club began to make plans for a new stadium. The building of the Camp Nou commenced on 28 March 1954, before a crowd of 60,000 Barça fans. The first stone of the future stadium was laid in place under the auspices of Governor Felipe Acedo Colunga and with the blessing of Archbishop of Barcelona Gregorio Modrego. Construction took three years and ended on 24 September 1957 with a final cost of 288 million pesetas, 336% over budget.

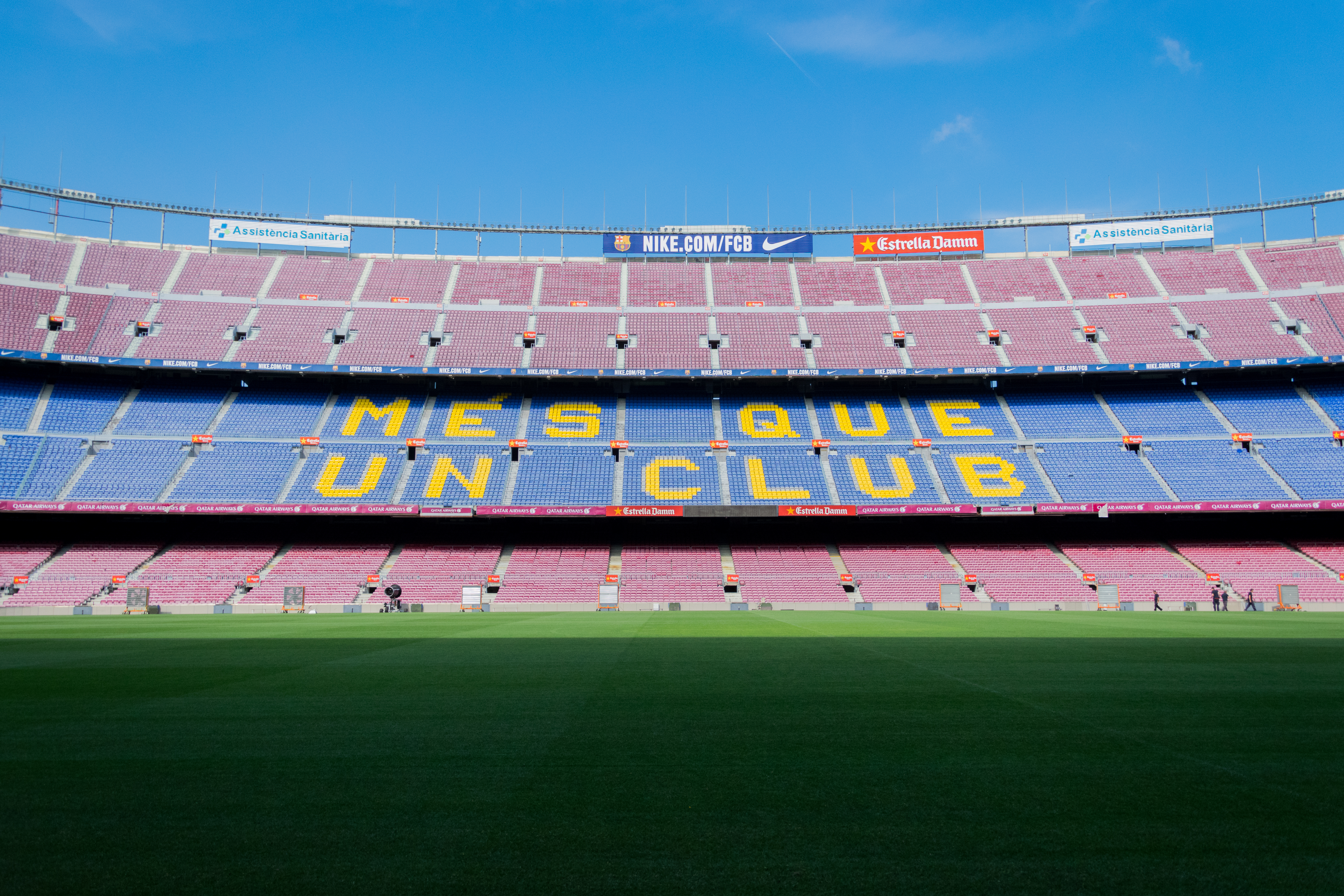
One of the Camp Nou stands displays Barcelona's motto, "Més que un club", meaning 'More than a club'.

In 1980, when the stadium was in need of redesign to meet UEFA criteria, the club raised money by offering supporters the opportunity to inscribe their name on the bricks for a small fee. The idea was popular with supporters, and thousands of people paid the fee. Later this became the centre of controversy when media in Madrid picked up reports that one of the stones was inscribed with the name of long-time Real Madrid chairman and Franco supporter Santiago Bernabéu. In preparation for the 1992 Summer Olympics, two tiers of seating were installed above the previous roofline. It has a current capacity of 99,354 - making it the largest stadium in Europe.

In December 2021, a record 88% of the club members voted in favor of the Espai Barça project to revamp the club's sporting facilities, being the first online referendum in Barcelona history. Originally projected to have been completed in 2021, renovation work on the Camp Nou began on 1 June 2023 and it is now aimed to finish by 2027, with an estimated €1.5 billion net funding. During the renovation period, Barcelona moved for 2 seasons to the Estadi Olímpic Lluís Companys in Montjuïc. Since November 2025, with the stadium still under construction, the first team plays again in Camp Nou, although not at full seat capacity.

There are also other facilities, which include:

- Ciutat Esportiva Joan Gamper (Barcelona's training ground)
- Masia-Centre de Formació Oriol Tort (Residence of young players)
- Estadi Johan Cruyff (Home of the reserve team, women's team, and Juvenil A)
- Palau Blaugrana (Barcelona indoor sports arena)
- Palau Blaugrana 2 (Secondary indoor arena of Barcelona)

== Honours ==
Type	Competition	Titles	Seasons
Domestic	La Liga	29	1929, 1944–45, 1947–48, 1948–49, 1951–52, 1952–53, 1958–59, 1959–60, 1973–74, 1984–85, 1990–91, 1991–92, 1992–93, 1993–94, 1997–98, 1998–99, 2004–05, 2005–06, 2008–09, 2009–10, 2010–11, 2012–13, 2014–15, 2015–16, 2017–18, 2018–19, 2022–23, 2024–25, 2025–26
Domestic	Copa del Rey	32	1910, 1912, 1913, 1920, 1922, 1925, 1926, 1928, 1942, 1951, 1952, 1952–53, 1957, 1958–59, 1962–63, 1967–68, 1970–71, 1977–78, 1980–81, 1982–83, 1987–88, 1989–90, 1996–97, 1997–98, 2008–09, 2011–12, 2014–15, 2015–16, 2016–17, 2017–18, 2020–21, 2024–25
Domestic	Copa de la Liga	2	1983, 1986
Domestic	Supercopa de España	16	1983, 1991, 1992, 1994, 1996, 2005, 2006, 2009, 2010, 2011, 2013, 2016, 2018, 2023, 2025, 2026
Domestic	Copa Eva Duarte	3	1948, 1952, 1953
Continental	UEFA Champions League	5	1991–92, 2005–06, 2008–09, 2010–11, 2014–15
Continental	UEFA Cup Winners' Cup	4	1978–79, 1981–82, 1988–89, 1996–97
Continental	UEFA Super Cup	5	1992, 1997, 2009, 2011, 2015
Continental	Inter-Cities Fairs Cup	3	1955–58, 1958–60, 1965–66
Continental	Latin Cup	2^{S}	1949, 1952
Worldwide	FIFA Club World Cup	3	2009, 2011, 2015
Regional	Catalan football championship	23	1901–02, 1902–03, 1904–05, 1908–09, 1909–10, 1910–11, 1912–13, 1915–16, 1918–19, 1919–20, 1920–21, 1921–22, 1923–24, 1924–25, 1925–26, 1926–27, 1927–28, 1929–30, 1930–31, 1931–32, 1933–34, 1935–36, 1937–38

- Record
- ^{S} Shared record

== Players ==
Spanish teams are limited to three players without EU citizenship. The squad list includes only the principal nationality of each player; several non-European players on the squad have dual citizenship with an EU country. Also, players from the ACP countries that are signatories to the Cotonou Agreement are not counted against non-EU quotas due to the Kolpak ruling.

=== Current squad ===
As of 2 September 2026

Note: Flags indicate national team as defined under FIFA eligibility rules; some limited exceptions apply. Players may hold more than one non-FIFA nationality.

No.	Pos.	Nation	Player
1	GK	ESP	Joan Garcia
2	DF	POR	João Cancelo
3	DF	ESP	Alejandro Balde
4	MF	ESP	Brian Fariñas
5	DF	ESP	Pau Cubarsí
6	MF	ESP	Gavi
7	MF	ESP	Fermín López
8	MF	ESP	Pedri (vice-captain)
9	FW	BRA	Gabriel Jesus
10	FW	ESP	Lamine Yamal (5th captain)
11	FW	BRA	Raphinha (captain)
12	DF	ESP	Xavi Espart
13	GK	POL	Wojciech Szczęsny
14	FW	GER	Karim Adeyemi

No.	Pos.	Nation	Player
15	DF	DEN	Andreas Christensen
16	MF	ESP	Rodri
17	FW	ENG	Anthony Gordon
18	DF	ESP	Gerard Martín
19	FW	SWE	Roony Bardghji
20	MF	ESP	Dani Olmo
21	MF	NED	Frenkie de Jong (4th captain)
22	MF	ESP	Marc Bernal
23	DF	FRA	Jules Koundé
24	DF	ESP	Eric Garcia (3rd captain)
25	GK	CRO	Dominik Livaković
27	FW	BEL	Jesse Bisiwu
29	FW	EGY	Hamza Abdelkarim

=== Reserve team and Youth Academy ===
Note: Flags indicate national team as defined under FIFA eligibility rules; some limited exceptions apply. Players may hold more than one non-FIFA nationality.

No.	Pos.	Nation	Player
30	MF	ESP	Ebrima Tunkara
31	GK	ESP	Eder Aller
32	MF	ISR	Orian Goren

No.	Pos.	Nation	Player
33	DF	ESP	Jordi Pesquer
35	GK	ESP	Iker Rodríguez
41	DF	ESP	Álex Campos

=== Out on loan ===
Note: Flags indicate national team as defined under FIFA eligibility rules; some limited exceptions apply. Players may hold more than one non-FIFA nationality.

No.	Pos.	Nation	Player
—	GK	GER	Marc-André ter Stegen (at Ajax until 30 June 2027)
—	DF	URU	Ronald Araújo (at Liverpool until 30 June 2027)

No.	Pos.	Nation	Player
—	MF	ESP	Marc Casadó (at Deportivo A Coruña until 30 June 2027)
—	FW	ESP	Toni Fernández (at Venezia until 30 June 2027)

== Management ==
=== Technical staff ===
Position	Staff
Head coach	(Germany) Hansi Flick
Assistant coaches	(Germany) Marcus Sorg (Croatia) Toni Tapalović (Germany) Heiko Westermann (Spain) Arnau Blanco
Goalkeeping coach	(Spain) José Ramón de la Fuente
Gym and strength fitness coach	(Germany) Benjamin Kugel
Field fitness coaches	(Spain) Pepe Conde (Spain) Rafa Maldonado (Spain) Germán Fernández (Spain) Fernando Hernández (Spain) Andrés Martín (Spain) Milos Mallol
Rehab coaches	(Spain) Yon Álvarez (Spain) Juan Carlos Pérez Pérez
Analysts	(Germany) Stephan Nopp (Germany) Michael Hasemann (Spain) Eloy Jordan (Spain) Xavier Pavo (Spain) Jordi Pons
Video analyst	(Spain) Francesc Martí
Match analyst	(Spain) Guillem Escriu
Club doctors	(Spain) Ricard Pruna (Spain) Lucas Gómez
Physiotherapists	(Spain) Raúl Martínez (Spain) Fernando Galán (Spain) Pablo Merino (Spain) Xavier López (Spain) Borja Vera (Spain) Alejandro Kenji Fernández (Spain) Pedro Ballesteros (Spain) Jose María Cortés
Nutritionist	(Spain) Mireia Porta Oliva
Delegate	(Spain) Carles Naval

Last updated: 24 September 2026
Source: FC Barcelona - First Team Annual Report 2025/26

=== Football Sport Management ===
Position	Staff
Director of football	(Portugal) Deco
Football coordinator	(Spain) Bojan Krkić
Director of scouting	(Portugal) Joao Pedro Amaral
Managerial director	(Spain) Franc Carbó
Barça Atlètic Head coach	(Brazil) Juliano Belletti
Youth football general manager	(Spain) José Ramón Alexanko
Youth football coordinators	(Spain) Zigor Alesanco (Spain) Sergi Milà
Juvenil A (U19 A) Head coach	(Spain) Pol Planas
Juvenil B (U19 B) Head coach	(Spain) Cesc Bosch
Head of FUTBOL 11	(Spain) Sergi Milà
Head of FUTBOL 7	(Spain) Marc Serra
Goalkeeping coordinator from Cadet A (U16A) to Prebenjamí (U8B)	(Spain) Jesús Unzué

Last updated: 25 September 2025
Source: FC Barcelona

=== Board of directors ===
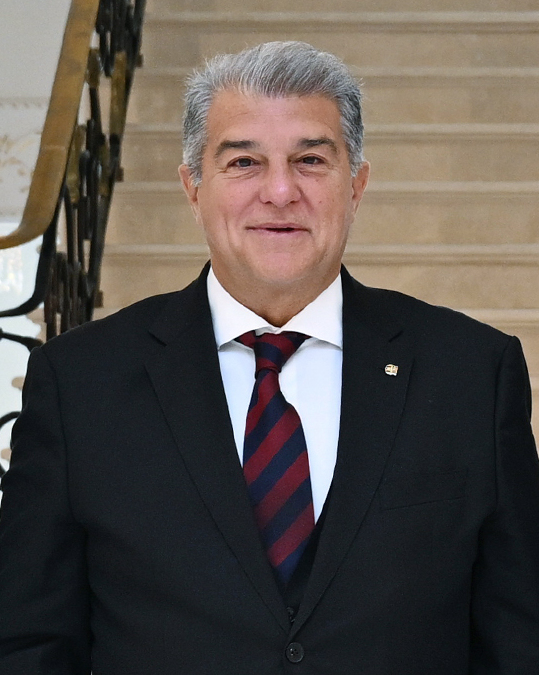
Joan Laporta is the current club president.

Office	Name
President	Joan Laporta
First Vice President; Director Responsible for Sporting Area; Director of the Barça Foundation	Rafa Yuste
Vice-President for Institutional Affairs and Club Spokesperson	Elena Fort
Vice-President for Social Affairs	Antonio Escudero
Vice-President for Economic Affairs	Ferran Olivé
Vice-President for the Commercial Area	Joan Soler
Secretary; Director Responsible for Basketball	Josep Cubells
Treasurer	Alfons Castro
Director Responsible for Women's Football	Xavier Puig
Director Responsible for Social Area	Josep Ignasi Macià
Director Responsible for Handball	Joan Solé
Director Responsible for Futsal	Aureli Mas
Director Assistant to the Delegate Counsellor	Josep Maria Albert
Director Responsible for Roller Hockey	Xavier Barbany
Board Members	Àngel Riudalbas; Carme Hortalà; Jaume Santiveri; Miquel Camps; Xavier Barniol; Carles Ayats; Jaume Nicolàs; Sisco Pujol
President of Barça Atlètic	Jordi Casals

Last updated: 25 September 2026
Source: FC Barcelona

== See also ==
- Barcelona Atlètic – FC Barcelona's reserve football team
- Barcelona Bàsquet – Basketball section of the FC Barcelona sports club
- Barcelona C – FC Barcelona's defunct reserve football team
- Barcelona Femení – FC Barcelona women's football team
- Barcelona Futsal – Futsal section of the FC Barcelona sports club
- Barcelona Handbol – Handball section of the FC Barcelona sports club
- Barcelona Voleibol – Spanish professional Men's Volleyball team
- List of fan-owned sports teams
- List of world champion football clubs
