= 1952 Copa del Generalísimo final =

Copa del Generalísimo 1952 final
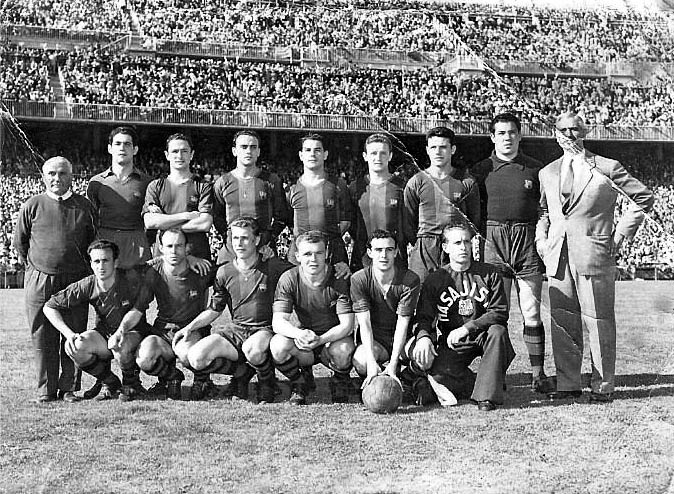
- FC Barcelona, champions
- Event: 1952 Copa del Generalísimo
Barcelona	Valencia
4	2
- Date: 25 May 1952
- Venue: Estadio Chamartín, Madrid
- Referee: Andrés Rivero
- Attendance: 80,000

The Copa del Generalísimo 1952 final was the 50th final of the King's Cup. The finals was played at Estadio Chamartín in Madrid, on 25 May 1952, being won by CF Barcelona, who beat Valencia CF 4–2 after extra time.

== Match details ==
25 May 1952
17:30 CET

Barcelona	4–2 (a.e.t.)	Valencia
Basora 40'; Vila 72'; Kubala 96'; César 119'	Report	Badenes 1', 28'

Estadio Chamartín, Madrid
Attendance: 80,000
Referee: Andrés Rivero

Barcelona

Valencia

GK	1	(Spain) Antoni Ramallets
DF	2	(Spain) Josep Seguer
DF	3	(Spain) Gustau Biosca
DF	4	(Spain) Cheché Martín
MF	5	(Spain) Andreu Bosch
MF	6	(Spain) Mariano Gonzalvo (c)
FW	7	(Spain) Estanislau Basora
FW	8	(Spain) César
FW	10	(Hungary) Ladislao Kubala
FW	9	(Spain) Jordi Vila
FW	11	(Spain) Eduardo Manchón
Manager:
(Czechoslovakia) Ferdinand Daučík

GK	1	(Spain) Quique	(substituted off) 118'
DF	2	(Spain) Gabriel Suñer
DF	3	(Spain) Salvador Monzó
DF	4	(Spain) Vicente Asensi (c)
MF	5	(Spain) Francisco Mir
MF	6	(Spain) Antonio Puchades
FW	7	(Spain) Quiliano Gago
FW	8	(Spain) Pasieguito
FW	9	(Spain) Manuel Badenes
FW	10	(Spain) Enrique Buqué
FW	11	(Spain) Vicente Seguí
Substitutes:
GK	12	(Spain) Cesáreo López	(substituted on) 118'
Manager:
(Spain) Jacinto Quincoces
