= El Otro Clásico =

Football matches between Atlético de Madrid and Barcelona

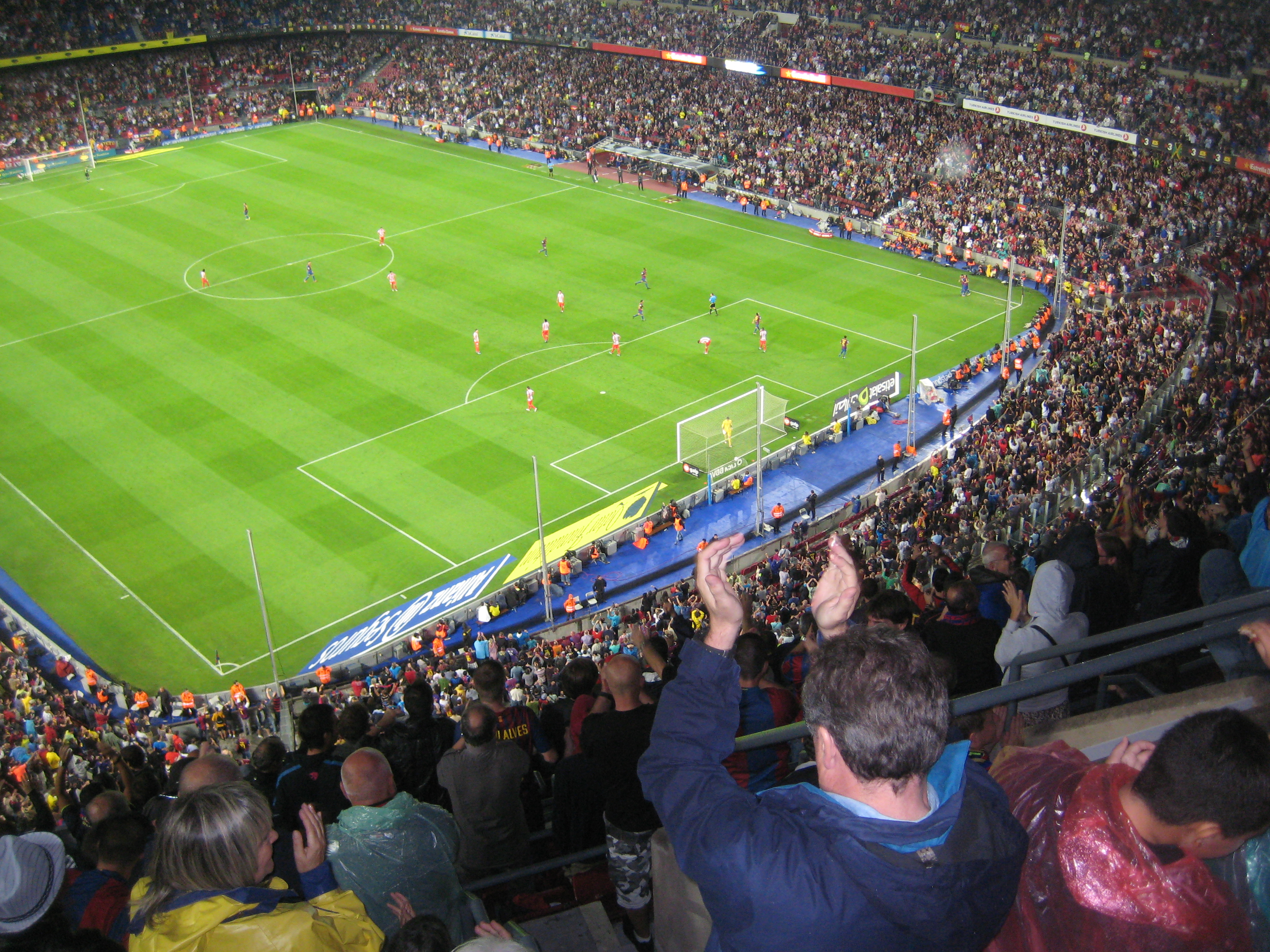
- Match in 2011 at Camp Nou
- Location: Spain
- Teams: Atlético de Madrid; Barcelona
- First meeting: 19 April 1925; 1925 Copa del Rey semi-finals FC Barcelona 3–2 Atlético de Madrid
- Latest meeting: 8 November 2026; 2026-27 La Liga; Barcelona 2–1 Atlético de Madrid
- Next meeting: 2 December 2026; La Liga; Atlético de Madrid v Barcelona
- Stadiums: Camp Nou (Barcelona); Metropolitano Stadium (Atlético de Madrid)

Statistics
- Total meetings: 255 (official matches)
- Most wins: Barcelona (116)
- Most player appearances: Koke (42)
- Top scorer: Lionel Messi (30)
- Largest victory: Barcelona 8–1 Atlético de Madrid; 1952–53 Copa del Generalísimo semi-finals (7 June 1953)
- Longest win streak: 11 matches Barcelona (1991–1993)

El Otro Clásico (The Other Derby or The Other Clásico) has been the name given to football matches between Atlético de Madrid and Barcelona.

Although both fan bases have Real Madrid as their main rival, with whom they form the trio with largest fan base in Spain and the most titles in La Liga, matches between Atleti and Barça are not friendlies, even though they are characterized by a high average of goals. The mutual animosity has resulted in a balanced number of expulsions, with 38 for Barcelona and 39 for Atlético, between the first duel in 1925 and the year 2026.

In fact, in women's football, the main classic in Spanish football is traditionally between these two clubs, and not the Barcelona vs. Real Madrid El Clásico, or the Madrid derby. In men's football, the rivalry was especially strong in the 1970s, when the Madrid team had been consistently more successful in recent years to the point of having only one less La Liga title than the Catalan club. It was also during this period that Atlético won the 1974 Intercontinental Cup, while Barcelona only won its first world title in 2009, after being defeated in two previous attempts (1992 and 2006).

From the 2010s onwards, with Atlético re-establishing itself as a consistent contender for trophies, the duels between rojiblancos and blaugranas regained prominence, which included three occasions when they met in the quarter-finals of the UEFA Champions League (in 2014, 2016 and 2026) with the capital club eliminating Barcelona on all three occasions; also during this period, in the final round of 2013–14 La Liga, Atlético ended an eighteen-year drought without being Spanish champions precisely in a direct confrontation at Camp Nou.

Despite this unfavorable record in Champions League duels, Barcelona leads in other statistics, holding more titles in all competitions, a larger number of fans and a greater number of wins in direct duels: as of the first half of 2026, there had been 254 matches across all competitions, with 116 wins (and 474 goals for Barcelona) and 81 wins (and 374 goals) for Atlético. In La Liga, there were 178 matches (83 wins for Barcelona and 53 for Atlético), with another 50 in the Copa del Rey, in addition to eleven encounters in the Supercopa de España, six in the defunct Copa de la Liga, another six in the UEFA Champions League, two in the Copa Presidente de la Federación Española de Fútbol and one in the Copa Eva Duarte.

== History ==
=== Early years ===
Barcelona was founded in 1899. Atlético de Madrid emerged in 1903, the same year as the creation of the Copa del Rey. However, the first meeting between the two teams only took place in 1925.

In its early years, the Madrid club was a subsidiary of Athletic Bilbao. This had the practical consequence of preventing Atlético from participating in the Copa del Rey, which remained the only national competition in Spanish football until 1929, when La Liga was created; until then, the Spanish Cup shared the calendar with different regional championships, with Barcelona competing in the Catalan football championship, while Atlético participated in the Campeonato Regional Centro.

The legal separation between Athletic and Atlético occurred at the turn of the 1910s to the 1920s, allowing Atlético to begin competing in the Copa del Rey. The first match against Barcelona, on 19 April 1925, was valid for the semi-finals of the 1925 edition of that tournament. Barcelona won 3–2 at their old Les Corts stadium. Josep Samitier scored the first goal of the match, in the 30th minute of the first half. Vicente Palacios equalized in the following minute and Andrés Tuduri even turned the score around in the 58th minute. The Catalans, however, also managed to turn the game around, with goals from Emili Sagi-Barba in the 62nd minute, from a penalty, and another from Samitier in the 75th minute.

In the second leg, Atlético won 2–1 on 26 April, at his old Estadio Metropolitano in Madrid. The two teams then played a playoff on 3 May, in Zaragoza, at the old Estadio Torrero, where Barcelona won 2–1, going on to become champions after defeating Arenas de Getxo in the final.

In the following season, Atlético and Barcelona met again, in the 1926 Copa del Rey final, in a single match at Mestalla Stadium in Valencia on 16 May. The Madrid team were winning 2–0, with goals from Vicente Palacios in the 16th minute and Cosme in the 58th minute. However, the Catalans managed a comeback; first, they equalized in almost consecutive plays, with Samitier in the 62nd minute and Just in the following minute. Four minutes from the end of extra time, Paulino Alcántara scored the final goal of 3–2.

The clubs only met again in 1929, already in La Liga, in its inaugural edition. Atlético won 4–1, in the 5th round, on 10 March, while Barcelona won 4–0 in the 13th round, on 26 May. The frequency of high-scoring games would become a curious feature of the event; the first twenty-five years included results such as 4–2 (for Barcelona) and 3–2 (for Atlético) in 1930, 5–1 (for Barcelona) in 1935, 4–4 in 1940, 4–2, 6–0 and 5–4 (all Atlético wins) in 1941, 5–1 (for Barcelona) and 4–0 (for Atlético) in 1942, 5–4 (for Atlético) in 1944, 3–2 (for Barcelona) in 1947, 4–0 (for Barcelona) and 4–1 (for Atlético) in 1949, 6–4 for Atlético in 1950.

By the mid 1940s, Atlético still had more titles in La Liga than Barcelona. In that decade, some seasons had direct races between both clubs. In the 1946–47 season, Valencia and Athletic shared the top of the table, with Valencia being crowned as champion. Both had just two points above Atlético and three over Barcelona. Barcelona won the 1947–48 and 1948–49 seasons, with Valencia as runner up in both, while Atlético was another close candidate: its distance to the champion in those seasons was by four points and by three, respectively.

In 1951, Atlético and Barcelona had the same titles at La Liga, with four each. At that same year, in 1 November 1951, they decided the Copa Eva Duarte, who worked as a Supercopa de España before the creation of this trophy in 1982. Atlético was 1950–51 La Liga champion, while Barcelona had won the 1951 Copa. The match was played at Estadio Chamartín. Atlético won 2–0 through goals of Henry Carlsson and Adrián Escudero. Both coaches of the match, Helenio Herrera (Atlético) and Ferdinand Daučík (Barcelona), would manage the opposite team years later on that same decade. There, Barcelona frequently achieved high-scoring victories: 5–2 and 5–1 in 1952, 6–1 and 8–1 in 1953, 4–0 in 1954, 7–3 in 1956, 5–2 and 8–1 in 1957 and 5–0 in 1958.

Despite these results on the 1950s, throughout most of the 20th century both clubs had approximately the same number of titles in the Spanish league, something that only changed after the arrival of Johan Cruijff as coach of the Catalan team in 1990.

=== The rivalry in the 70s and 80s ===
After the late 1940s, the achievements of one club did not use to occur in disputes with the other, but direct competition became a constant throughout the 1970s. Valencia won 1970–71 La Liga after a fierce race against Barcelona (who ended with the same points of the champion) and Atlético, just one point behind them. The first time in which Barcelona and Atlético jointly occupied first and second place in La Liga then occurred in the 1972–73 season. It became remembered for the unusual dispute, in a tournament whose dispute involved the two teams from Madrid and the two ones from Barcelona city: it was the season in which Espanyol, leading at one point in the final stretch, came closest in being champion of the first division, finishing the competition in 3rd, one point below Barça and three behind the champion Atleti.

That 1972–73 title meant Atlético had only one less La Liga title than Barcelona, which meant that Atlético's priority for the following season was initially to equal them as the second most successful team in the league. The Catalans reinforced their squad with Johan Cruijff and prevented this; it is in that context that Cruijff himself scored one of his most famous goals, in a 2–1 victory on 23 December 1973: in a move that earned him the nickname Flying Dutchman, Cruijff used an acrobatic move similar to a karate kick to take advantage of a cross from Carles Rexach and hit Miguel Reina's nets.

Later, for the second season in a row, 1973–74 La Liga saw the two clubs occupy the top two positions, this time with Barcelona as champions and Atlético as runners-up. It was because it became clear early on that the fight for that edition of the Spanish tournament was lost that the Madrid team began to focus its attention on the unprecedented UEFA Champions League. The Colchoneros reached the final of the 1973–74 season and were seconds away from winning it. Bayern Munich, however, managed to equalize in the last minute of extra time and win by a large margin in the replay. When the German club refused to play Independiente in the 1974 Intercontinental Cup, Atlético inherited the spot and became world champions decades before Barcelona.

Still in the 1970s, Atlético and Barcelona once again occupied the top two places in the 1976–77 La Liga, with Atlético being the champion and once again having one less title than the Blaugranas. The direct duel at Camp Nou in the 24th round proved preponderant, with Atlético maintaining a two-point advantage by securing a 1–1 draw thanks to an own goal by opponent Johan Neeskens.

The two clubs also contested the Spanish title in the 1980–81 season, in which the Madrid team gave the impression that they would be the champions, which at the time would have put them on par with Barcelona. However, the Madrid team weakened considerably in the final stretch, without a single victory in the final seven rounds. One of the then-leaders' untimely setbacks was at Camp Nou, with a 4–2 Barcelona victory orchestrated by Bernd Schuster, in a title race diluted with other clubs; the champions were Real Sociedad , who finished the competition three points ahead of Atlético.

Atlético and Barcelona faced each other again in the 1984–85 season, where they once again occupied the top two places. Another duel at Camp Nou, in the 26th round, proved decisive against Madrid's ambitions: Mario Cabrera and Hugo Sánchez scored goals in a 2–1 comeback victory. Barcelona had a ten-point advantage at that point, but Atlético had a game in hand and a victory for them could keep the title race alive. But Steve Archibald equalized three minutes from the end, psychologically securing the championship for the Catalans. Atlético was able to win the Copa del Rey in that same season and, later, obtain the 1985 Supercopa de España against Barcelona, winning 3–2 on aggregate.

=== Many goals in the 90s and 2000 ===
Johan Cruijff returned to Barcelona in 1990 as manager, at which time the club had ten Spanish league titles, just two ahead Atlético. In Cruijff's first season as manager, the 1990–91 La Liga title race was between the two clubs. Atlético was unbeaten in head-to-head matches, with a win in the Madrid and a draw at Camp Nou, [ 12 ] but finished runner-up to Barcelona. Atlético, Bernd Schuster's new club, simultaneously won the 1990–91 Copa del Rey. That lead to a second clash between the two for the Supercopa de España, which Barcelona won 2–1 on aggregate. Another race came in 1991–92 La Liga: Barcelona was champion one point above Real Madrid and just two points above the third placed Atlético.

From the "Cruijff Era" onwards, Barça won more Spanish titles than in all of its previous history, beginning with four consecutive championships between 1991 and 1994. Interestingly, a considerable number of its players had previously played for Atlético (cases of Julio Salinas, Eusebio Sacristán and Juan Carlos). There was even another Supercopa de España between the two teams in 1992, following Atlético's back-to-back Copa del Rey titles with Schuster. Again, Barcelona prevailed, winning both games.

Throughout the 1990s, there was a renewed frequency of high-scoring matches: Barcelona won 5–0 and 6–0 in 1993, and in that same year Atlético won 4–3. This match was particularly noteworthy because Romário scored the first three goals – however, his team ended up losing in the final minute at the Vicente Calderón Stadium. In 1994, Barcelona achieved victories of 5–3 and 4–3. In the first of these, Atlético were leading 2–1 and 3–2 at Camp Nou. In another hat trick display, Romário, who scored the first goal of the game, also scored the goals for 3–3 and 4–3, with Hristo Stoichkov scoring the other two for the winner.

Cruijff's cycle began to wear thin with the European runner-up finish in 1994 and ended against Atlético in the Copa del Rey final two seasons later. It was the second and last time the two clubs decided this tournament, seventy years after the first final between them. The previous edition had seen an aggregate score of 5–4 for Atlético in the round of 16, with curious thrashings each in the rival's stadium: Atlético won 4–1 at Camp Nou and Barcelona defeated them 3–1 at the Calderón. In the 1996 final, at La Romareda, Milinko Pantić scored in extra time the only goal.

In that 1995–96 season, Atlético achieved their only double, also winning La Liga, the only title the Colchoneros achieved in it between 1977 and 2014. As Copa del Rey runners-up, Barcelona faced them in the Supercopa de España that opened the following season, in two matches. The first of these marked Ronaldo's debut for Barça, with him scoring two goals in a 5–2 victory, in which his compatriot Giovanni stood out with another goal and three assists at the Estadi Olímpic Lluís Companys. Both players were absent from the return leg, due to commitments with the Brazil national football team, and in it the comfortable Blaugrana advantage was close in being reversed with Atlético's 3–1 victory at La Peineta.

Following that Supercopa, that Spanish season continued with further eye-catching results: in 1996–97 La Liga, there was a 3–3 draw at Camp Nou (Giovanni scored the equalizer) and a 5–2 Barcelona victory (with three goals from Ronaldo) at the Calderón. The most high-profile duel, however, took place in the quarter-finals of the 1996–97 Copa del Rey: Pantić scored four goals in a single game to open up a 4–0 lead at Camp Nou, in the second leg. Ronaldo and Luís Figo equalized, which would still qualify Atleti, as the first leg had ended 2–2. In the final minute, Juan Antonio Pizzi scored the winning goal for the Culés, who would later become Copa champions. In one of those fierce matches, Ronaldo even went so far as to make the obscene gesture of the bras d'honneur to Rojiblancos fans after scoring.

Atlético still managed to win 5–2 in 1998 and win 3–0 in the first leg of the 1999–2000 Copa del Rey semi-finals, being awarded another 3–0 in the second leg due to Barcelona's walkover. However, the Madrid club also ended up relegated in that season, remaining in the Segunda División for two seasons, until 2002.

The Rojiblanca reality remained modest for most of the 2000s, years in which Atlético failed to win any Madrid derby matches, with Real Madrid remaining unbeaten against their neighbours between 1999 and 2013. Against Barcelona, however, Atlético had balanced statistics; there were seven wins for Barcelona (especially the 6–0 in 2007, the 6–1 in 2008 and the 5–2 in 2009) and six for Atlético throughout the 2000s. The Madrid side, who had five consecutive games without losing to Barcelona between 2004 and 2006, were able to achieve victories such as the 3–0 in 2003, the 3–1 at Camp Nou in 2006, the 4–2 in 2008 and the 4–3 in 2009.

=== The rivalry becomes continental ===
Atlético under–18 and Barcelona under–18 teams at Jakarta in 2022.

The 2010s began with Atlético de Madrid winning the 2009–10 UEFA Europa League. However, the club was threatened with relegation again in the 2011–12 La Liga, recovering in the second half with the arrival of Diego Simeone as coach. Simeone also became the link between the 1996 championship-winning team, when he was still playing, and Atleti's two subsequent La Liga titles in the 2013–14 and 2020–21 seasons. The 2014 title was won in close competition with Barcelona until the final round, with a 1–1 draw at Camp Nou being enough for Atlético to win the championship again after eighteen years. Diego Godín scored the winning goal.

In the same season as the national reconquest, the capital club was also able to eliminate the Catalans in the 2013–14 UEFA Champions League, which marked the first derbies between Atlético and Barcelona valid for that competition. A season later, the duel again served to mathematically define the Spanish title, with Barcelona being crowned 2014–15 La Liga champion in the opponent's stadium: Lionel Messi scored the only goal of the encounter at the Vicente Calderón.

Throughout the 2010s, the two teams also clashed in the Supercopa de España in 2013, with two draws, and met again in the UEFA Champions League in the 2015–16 quarterfinals, with Atlético again qualifying. The frequency of high-scoring matches decreased until two consecutive semi-finals in the Copa del Rey, already in the 2020s: : 4–4 in 2025 and then a 4–0 victory for Atlético in February 2026 almost reversed in the return leg, won 3–0 by Barcelona in March. In April, in 2025–26 UEFA Champions League, the two clubs then met again in the quarter-finals. For the third time in this tournament, Atlético ended up qualifying.

By 2026, when Simeone completed fifteen years as Atlético's coach, the club was able to celebrate eight different titles during that period, which also included the 2017–18 UEFA Europa League and two against Real Madrid, in the 2012–13 Copa del Rey and the 2018 UEFA Super Cup. As a result, matches against Barcelona also gained special attention, with the duel increasingly receiving the nickname El Otro Clásico since the 2010s; shortly after the end of the season, there were sharp public barbs from Atlético against Barça's interest in Julián Álvarez: the Madrid team, surprisingly due to its unusually aggressive tone, rejected negotiations by issuing a succession of ironic statements interspersed with accusations of poaching and implicit references to the Negreira case.

== Records ==
The player with the most appearances in the duel, with 42 in total (all for Atlético de Madrid), is Koke. The first of these games was precisely his debut as a footballer in the Atleti first team.

On Barcelona side, the record holder for appearances is Lionel Messi, with 30. Messi is also the top scorer in the derby, with 26 goals.

The Atlético footballer with the most goals in the derby is Paco Campos, with 12 goals between 1938 and 1948, followed by Fernando Torres with 8 goals.

The biggest win in the derby has occurred twice, in 8–1 victories for Barcelona in the Copa del Rey semi-final on 7 June 1953 and in the round of 16 of the same tournament on 1 May 1957. In La Liga, the biggest win was on 20 May 2007, at the Vicente Calderón Stadium.

Atlético's biggest win came on 13 April 1941, in a 6–0 victory in the Copa Presidente de la Federación Española de Fútbol. In La Liga, the biggest win by a large margin for the Rojiblancos was 5–2 on 10 May 1998, and in the Copa del Rey, there was two 4–0 victories: in the quarter-finals on 12 April 1989, and in the semi-finals on 10 February 2026.

The highest-scoring derbies were Atlético's 6–4 win on 17 September 1950 and Barcelona's 7–3 win on 23 September 1953, both in La Liga.

== In both clubs ==
=== Players ===
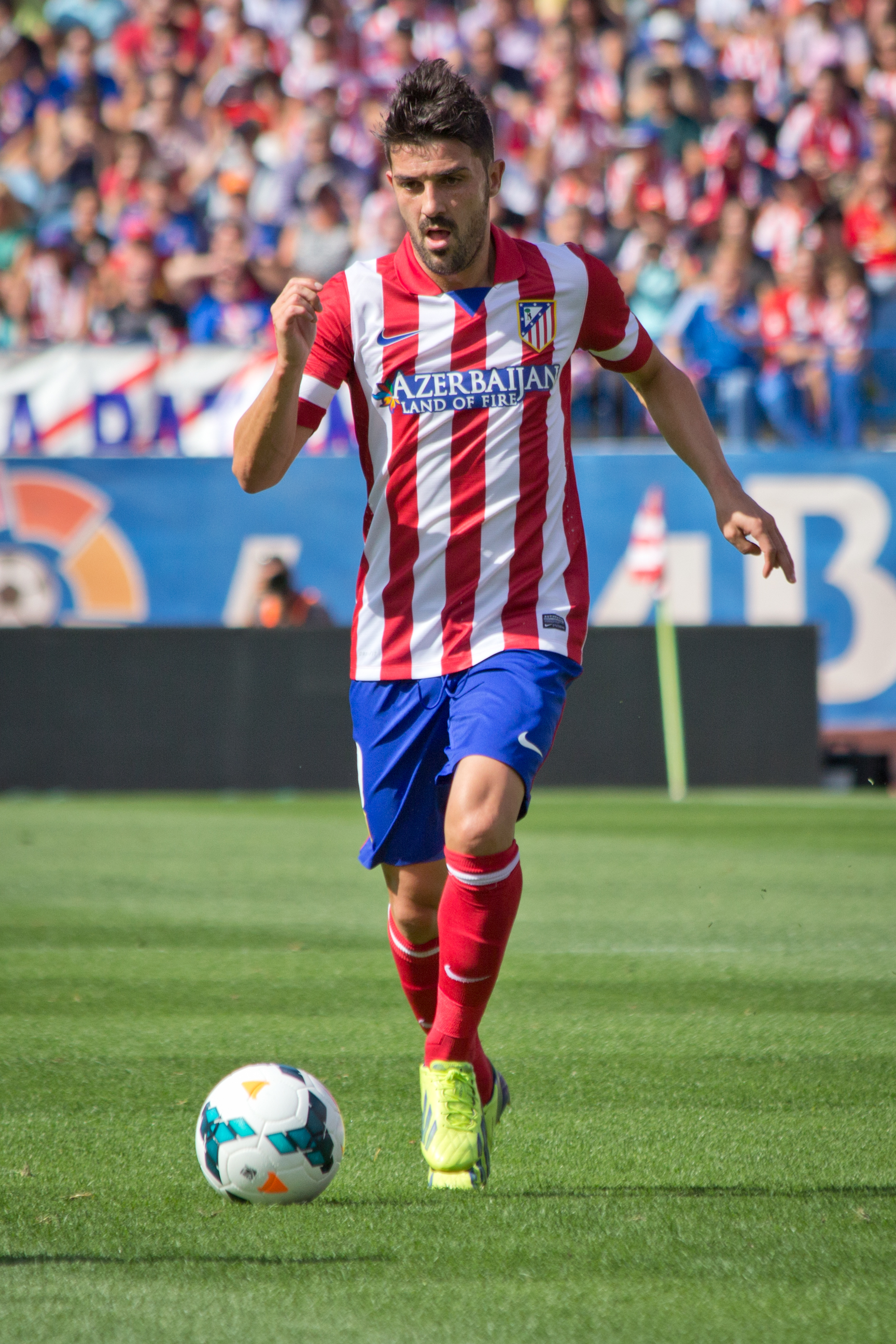
David Villa is La Liga champion for both clubs and UEFA Champions League finalist for both as well.

In total, 42 footballers have played for both Atlético de Madrid and Barcelona, excluding friendlies. The ultimate symbol of their common rival, the Argentinian Alfredo Di Stéfano played friendlies for both teams, as well as having played professionally for Espanyol, but is not included in the official list.

The first players to play for both made the switch in the same year. Victoriano de Santos played for Atlético from 1928 to 1933, Barcelona between 1933 and 1934 and again for Atlético from 1934 to 1939. Ángel Arocha went the opposite way: he played for Barcelona from 1928 and in 1933 he moved to Atlético, where he stopped playing in 1936. but is not included in the official list.

José Arana, a Barcelona player between 1934 and 1935, played for Atlético between 1941 and 1942, with José García-Nieto doing exactly the opposite.

Miguel Ángel Valcárcel played for Atlético between 1935 and 1936 and then for Barcelona between 1939 and 1940.

Luis Miranda had the distinction of also having played for Real Madrid in 1939, the year he moved to Barcelona, a club he played for until 1940 and which he left in 1941 for Atlético.

Fernando de Argila played for Barcelona from 1941 to 1943 and for Atlético between 1951 and 1952; José María Martín played for Barcelona from 1950 to 1953, then for Atlético, his club until 1956.

Paraguayan Eulogio Martínez was at Barcelona from 1955 to 1962 and then at Atlético between 1964 and 1965. Ramón de Pablo Marañón initially played for Atlético from 1956 to 1958 before two spells at Barcelona, from 1960 to 1962 and between 1963 and 1964.

Gonzalo Díaz Beitia first established himself at Athletic Bilbao, winning the national Cup in 1958. He moved to Barcelona in 1960, but failed to overcome the competition from Zoltán Czibor. He remained in Catalonia until 1961 and, in 1963, joined Atlético, his club until 1964. There, he was hampered by competition from Enrique Collar.

Angolan Jorge Mendonça was at Atlético between 1958 and 1967, then moved to Barcelona until 1969. A player for the Portuguese national football team, Mendonça distinguished himself as a finalist in the UEFA Cup Winners' Cup with both clubs. He is also considered the first Portuguese to play in the first division of another European country, the first Portuguese to be champion in another European league and the first one to score a goal in a continental final for a foreign team, as well as the first Portuguese player for Barcelona.

Marcial Pina played for Barcelona between 1969 and 1977 and then for Atlético from 1977 until 1980.

Goalkeeper Miguel Reina played for Barcelona from 1966 to 1973, then for Atlético until 1980. A champion with both teams, he was also awarded the Ricardo Zamora Trophy as a player for both. His son, also a goalkeeper, Pepe Reina, began his career at Barcelona.

Juanjo Enríquez was at Barcelona between 1977 and 1978 and at Atlético from 1981 to 1984, a period in which Enrique Morán played for Barcelona. Morán, in turn, was at Atlético from then until 1985.

Jesús Landáburu played for Barcelona from 1979 to 1982 and for Atlético from 1982 to 1989.

Marcos Alonso had the unique distinction of being both the son and father of Real Madrid players. His father was Marquitos, who even scored a goal in the first Champions League final, in 1956. Despite this, Alonso Peña had stints at both rival clubs; he played for Atlético from 1979 to 1982, Barcelona from 1982 to 1987 and again for Atlético from 1987 to 1989, as well as being the Atleti coach between 2000 and 2001. However, his son, also called Marcos Alonso, grew at Real Madrid, although he later went on to play for Barcelona. These three players make up the family with the most appearances for the Spain national football team.

Julio Alberto was a teammate of some of the names mentioned above at both clubs. He was at Atlético from 1977 to 1982 and at Barcelona from 1982 to 1987.

Julio Salinas, Eusebio Sacristán and Juan Carlos had the distinction of playing for Atlético before becoming teammates at Barcelona under coach Johan Cruijff. Salinas first made a name for himself with Athletic Bilbao's last La Liga titles, from where he was acquired by Atlético in 1986, moving to Barcelona in 1988. Eusebio played for Atlético from 1987 and also moved to Barcelona in 1988. Juan Carlos was with the Madrid team between 1989 and 1991, when he arrived at Barcelona. He and Salinas remained at the Catalan club until 1994 and Eusebio until 1995.

German Bernd Schuster achieved the feat of being an idol and champion at the three main Spanish clubs. He was at Barcelona for most of the 1980s, between 1980 and 1988, with disagreements with management leading him to sign with Real Madrid in 1988. In the capital, he again alternated great performances with disagreements with the directors and again opted to go directly to a rival, reinforcing Atlético in 1990, his club until 1993.

Miquel Soler, in turn, was able to play for both Madrid teams and both Barcelona teams. A key member of Espanyol's runners-up in the 1987–88 UEFA Cup, he was traded to Barça in the same year; the 400 million pesetas involved in the deal were even considered "astronomical" for the time. He initially remained at Camp Nou until 1991, then spent a season at Atlético. He played for Barcelona for another season and was at Real Madrid between 1995 and 1996.

Delfí Geli, Pablo Alfaro, Lluís Carreras and Sergi Barjuan all first played for Barcelona (respectively, from 1989 to 1991; between 1992 and 1993; between 1993 and 1994; and from 1993 to 2002) and then for Atlético (respectively, from 1994 to 1999; between 1996 and 1997; in 2002 and 2003; and from 2002 to 2005).

Luis García had two spells at Atlético, between 2002 and 2003 and between 2007 and 2009, playing for Barcelona in between (between 2003 and 2004). Santiago Ezquerro, in turn, was scouted from Basque teams by Atlético in 1996. From 1998, he played for Athletic Bilbao, being more associated with this club. He remained there until 2005, when he was then signed for one season by Barcelona.

Also in the 2000s, numerous foreigners played for both: the Italian Demetrio Albertini (at Atlético between 2002 and 2003, played for Barcelona in 2005), the Portuguese Simão Sabrosa (at Barcelona between 1999 and 2001 and at Atlético from 2007 to 2010) and the Italian-Brazilian Thiago Motta (at Barcelona from 2001 to 2007 and at Atlético until 2008).

Of the most recent names who have played for both, David Villa and Rodri are the two Spaniards to have played: the others are the Turk Arda Turan, the Frenchman Antoine Griezmann, the Uruguayan Luis Suárez, the Argentinian Sergio Agüero, the Portuguese João Félix, the Dutchman Memphis Depay and the Frenchman Clément Lenglet.

=== Coaches ===
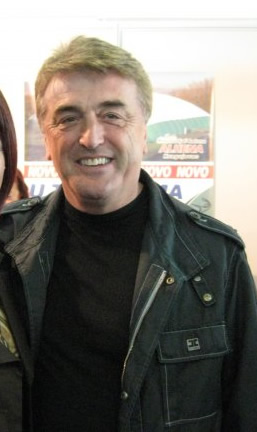
Radomir Antić at 2009.

The manager of Atlético Madrid's first two La Liga titles was Ricardo Zamora, in the back-to-back championships of 1939–40 and 1940–41. As a player, Zamora had also distinguished himself at Barcelona and at Barça other two rivals, Espanyol and Real Madrid. However, the first to coach both Atlético (between 1935 and 1936) and Barcelona (between 1944 and 1947) was Josep Samitier. Curiously, as a player, Samitier had also played for Barcelona and Real Madrid, like Zamora.He scored the first goal in the history of matches between Barcelona and Atlético.

Born in Argentina and raised between Morocco and France, Helenio Herrera won La Liga with both teams in the 1950s. At Atleti, he won his third and fourth Spanish league titles (in the 1949–50 and 1950–51 seasons), the last consecutive back-to-back titles the club has achieved to date, which also made Atlético a more successful team than Real (who had two Spanish league titles at the time) for a few years. Herrera also won the 1951 Copa Eva Duarte, by beating Barcelona, in a match held as the Supercopa de España of that period. Once in Camp Nou, he initially stayed from 1958 to 1960, also winning two consecutive Spanish league titles (1958–59 and 1959–60), making the club the most successful team in the tournament up to that point. Herrera won the 1955–1958 Inter-Cities Fairs Cup final and most of the 1958–1960 Inter-Cities Fairs Cup during that period. He returned to Camp Nou between 1979 and 1981, winning the 1980–81 Copa del Rey.

Slovak Ferdinand Daučík was the brother-in-law of star player László Kubala, who joined Barcelona precisely because the Culé board agreed to hire Daučík as coach. They were defeated by Helenio Herrera's side at that 1951 Copa Eva Duarte, but Daučík and Kubala could won together the 1951 Copa and then both La Liga and Copa double titles at 1951–52 and 1952–53 seasons. Daučík also won La Liga while coaching Athletic Bilbao before having a brief spell at Atlético in the late 1950s. He later coached another Barça rival, Espanyol, between 1970 and 1971.

Former Barcelona player Domènec Balmanya coached the team that won the 1957 Copa and worked in most of the 1955–1958 Inter-Cities Fairs Cup campaign. He later coached an Atlético team that won the 1965–66 La Liga.

Raised as a footballer at Real Madrid, Luis Aragonés became one of the biggest icons of Atlético. He won La Liga three times as a player and scored the almost decisive goal in the 1973–74 Champions League final. He took over the club as coach shortly afterwards, being the manager to the 1974 Intercontinental Cup victory. He had several other spells managing the club, winning the 1975–76, 1984–85 and 1991–92 Copas; the 1976–77 La Liga (a title with Barcelona as runner-up); the 1985 Supercopa de España, against Barcelona; and the promotion to the first division in 2002. As a manager, he also spent some time at Barcelona, between 1987 and 1988, winning the Copa del Rey in that season. Aragonés also managed the neighbour Espanyol, between 1990 and 1991; and both sides of the Andalusian Derby, working in Sevilla FC and Real Betis in the 1990s.

Argentine César Luis Menotti, the 1978 FIFA World Cup-winning coach, worked at Barcelona between 1983 and 1984 (winning 1982–83 Copa del Rey, 1983 Copa de la Liga and 1983 Supercopa de España) and at Atlético between 1987 and 1988.

José Luis Romero, as a player, defended Barcelona and his rival Espanyol in the 1970s. As a coach, he was Barça interim coach in 1983 and he later managed the B team. At Atlético, he interim coach for two matches in 1994.

Serbian Radomir Antić became the only manager to coach all three main Spanish clubs. He began the 1990s at the helm of Real Madrid, without preventing Barcelona's titles under Johan Cruijff. He was particularly recognized at Atlético de Madrid, as the coach of the historic double at 1995–96 season, with titles in both La Liga and (by winning Barcelona in the final) Copa del Rey. Thus, he was urgently called upon in 2000 to try to avoid Atleti relegation, which proved impossible, although his team could reach the 2000 Copa del Rey final. In 2002, Antić then went to Barcelona, averting the threat of relegation seen in the beginning of 2002–03 season and promoting Andrés Iniesta's debut in the first team.
