= Estanislau Basora =

Spanish footballer (1926–2012)

Personal information
- Full name: Estanislau Basora Brunet
- Date of birth: 18 November 1926
- Place of birth: Colonia Valls, Spain
- Date of death: 16 March 2012 (aged 85)
- Place of death: Las Palmas, Spain
- Height: 1.68 m (5 ft 6 in)
- Positions: Winger; striker

Youth career
- Colonia Valls
- Súria

Senior career*
Years	Team	Apps	(Gls)
1943–1946	Manresa		
1946–1958	Barcelona	237	(89)
1955–1956	→ Lleida (loan)	16	(6)
Total		253	(95)

International career
1949	Spain B	1	(0)
1949–1957	Spain	22	(13)
1948–1958	Catalan XI	5	(2)
- * Club domestic league appearances and goals

Estanislau Basora Brunet (also Estanislao; 18 November 1926 – 16 March 2012) was a Spanish footballer who played as a winger or striker.

Most of his 15-year career was spent at FC Barcelona for which he appeared in more than 300 official games, surpassing the 100-goal mark and winning 14 major titles.

A Spanish international in the late 1940s/early 1950s, Basora represented the nation at the 1950 World Cup.

== Club career ==
Born in Colonia Valls, Barcelona, Catalonia, Basora joined local and La Liga giants FC Barcelona in 1946, from neighbouring CE Manresa. He made his league debut on 22 September in a 1–1 home draw against Celta de Vigo, but finished his first season with only three appearances for the club.

In the following years, however, Basora was an undisputed starter, winning four titles from 1947 to 1949, including two national championships to which he contributed with 20 goals in 51 games combined under coach Enrique Fernández. He was part of a legendary offensive line which also included César, László Kubala, Eduardo Manchón, Mariano Martín and Moreno, and scored the opening goal in the 1949 Latin Cup final, a 2–1 victory over Sporting Clube de Portugal.

In the 1951–52 season, Basora was an essential offensive unit as Barça won five titles. He scored eight in 27 matches in the league, and also found the net in the campaign's Copa del Generalísimo final, a 4–2 win against Valencia CF. He also spent one of his twelve years with the team on loan to another outfit in the region, UE Lleida, retiring in 1959 at nearly 33 years of age with official totals for his main club of 301 games and 113 goals; in 1974, during Barcelona's 75th anniversary celebrations, he was included in their all-time best XI.

== International career ==
During eight years, Basora played 22 games and scored 13 goals for Spain. On 12 June 1949 he netted on his debut, a 4–1 win against the Republic of Ireland. A week later, in another friendly, he scored a hat-trick within fifteen minutes against France at the Stade de Colombes, being subsequently dubbed by the French press "The Monster of Colombes".

Basora represented the nation at the 1950 FIFA World Cup in Brazil, forming a formidable offensive partnership with Telmo Zarra. In the opening game against the United States, Spain were 0–1 down with ten minutes to go before Basora scored twice inside a minute – Zarra then added a third for the final 3–1.

In the second group game Spain beat Chile 2–0, with both players again on target. The side then confirmed its place in the next stage with a 1–0 win against England, with Zarra heading in a Basora cross; the second group stage started against Uruguay, and he found the net twice to help the team come from behind 0–1, but the South Americans eventually tied it 2–2 and the national team lost the following two games.

Between 1948 and 1958 Basora also played five games for the Catalan XI, scoring twice. On 26 January 1955, he appeared alongside Kubala and guest player Alfredo Di Stéfano in a game against Bologna FC 1909 at the Camp de Les Corts.

=== International goals ===
#	Date	Venue	Opponent	Score	Result	Competition
1.	12 June 1949	Dalymount Park, Dublin, Republic of Ireland	Republic of Ireland	1–2	1–4	Friendly
2.	19 June 1949	Colombes, Paris, France	France	0–1	1–5	Friendly
3.	19 June 1949	Colombes, Paris, France	France	0–2	1–5	Friendly
4.	19 June 1949	Colombes, Paris, France	France	0–3	1–5	Friendly
5.	2 April 1950	Nuevo Chamartín, Madrid, Spain	Portugal	2–0	5–1	1950 World Cup qualification
6.	25 June 1950	Durival de Britto, Curitiba, Brazil	United States	2–1	3–1	1950 FIFA World Cup
7.	29 June 1950	Maracanã, Rio de Janeiro, Brazil	Chile	1–0	2–0	1950 FIFA World Cup
8.	9 July 1950	Pacaembu, São Paulo, Brazil	Uruguay	1–1	2–2	1950 FIFA World Cup
9.	9 July 1950	Pacaembu, São Paulo, Brazil	Uruguay	1–2	2–2	1950 FIFA World Cup
10.	1 June 1952	Nuevo Chamartín, Madrid, Spain	Republic of Ireland	4–0	6–0	Friendly
11.	1 June 1952	Nuevo Chamartín, Madrid, Spain	Republic of Ireland	6–0	6–0	Friendly
12.	16 May 1957	Santiago Bernabéu, Madrid, Spain	Scotland	3–0	4–1	1958 World Cup qualification
13.	16 May 1957	Santiago Bernabéu, Madrid, Spain	Scotland	4–1	4–1	1958 World Cup qualification

== Personal life and death ==
Basora's younger brother, Joaquín, was also a footballer. Often referred to as Basora II, the forward represented, in the top division, CD Condal and Sporting de Gijón.

On 16 March 2012, days after having suffered a heart attack, Basora died at the University Hospital of Las Palmas. He was 85 years old.

== Honours ==
Barcelona

- Inter-Cities Fairs Cup: 1955–58
- La Liga: 1947–48, 1948–49, 1951–52, 1952–53
- Copa del Generalísimo: 1951, 1952, 1952–53, 1957
- Latin Cup: 1949, 1952
- Copa Eva Duarte: 1948, 1952, 1953
- Small Club World Cup: 1957
