= Tomás Hernández =

Spanish footballer

Moreno
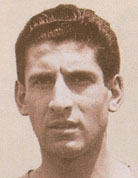

Personal information
- Full name: Tomás Hernández Burillo
- Date of birth: 19 February 1930
- Place of birth: Zaragoza, Spain
- Date of death: 2 January 1982 (aged 51)
- Place of death: Zaragoza, Spain
- Height: 1.66 m (5 ft 5 in)
- Position: Forward

Youth career
- Amistad
- Atlético Zaragoza

Senior career*
Years	Team	Apps	(Gls)
1951–1952	Huesca	15	(11)
1952–1956	Barcelona	68	(39)
1955	→ España Industrial (loan)	3	(1)
1956	→ Lleida (loan)	6	(3)
1956	Las Palmas	9	(2)
1956–1958	Zaragoza	15	(1)
1958–?	Arenas Zaragoza		
Total		116	(57)

International career
1953	Spain B	1	(0)
1953	Spain	2	(0)
- * Club domestic league appearances and goals

Tomás Hernández Burillo (19 February 1930 – 2 January 1982), commonly known as Moreno, was a Spanish footballer who played as a forward.

== Club career ==
Born in Zaragoza, Aragon, Moreno spent four years of his career with La Liga giants FC Barcelona, after signing from local UD Huesca in early 1952. In his first two seasons the Catalonia club won the league, the Copa del Rey and the Copa Eva Duarte, with the player being instrumental in the 1952–53 league conquest – 22 goals in just 30 matches, only trailing Telmo Zarra in the Pichichi Trophy race. He was part of the Blaugrana's attacking line which also featured César, László Kubala, Eduardo Manchón and Mariano Martín.

Moreno retired professionally in 1958 at only 28, after unassuming top division spells with UD Las Palmas and Real Zaragoza, dying in his hometown at the age of 51.

== International career ==
Courtesy of his spectacular club season with Barcelona, Moreno earned two caps with Spain, both in July 1953. His debut came on the 5th, in a 0–1 friendly loss to Argentina.

== Honours ==
Barcelona

- La Liga: 1951–52, 1952–53
- Copa del Generalísimo: 1952, 1952–53
- Copa Eva Duarte: 1952, 1953
- Latin Cup: 1952
