= Eduardo Manchón =

Spanish footballer

Personal information
- Full name: Eduardo Manchón Molina
- Date of birth: 24 July 1930
- Place of birth: Barcelona
- Date of death: 29 September 2010 (aged 80)
- Place of death: Barcelona
- Height: 1.68 m (5 ft 6 in)
- Position: Forward

Youth career
- 1948−1949: Barcelona amateur
- 1949−1950: SD España Industrial

Senior career*
Years	Team	Apps	(Gls)
1950−1957	FC Barcelona	144	(57)
1957−1958	Granada CF	17	(4)
1958−1959	Deportivo de La Coruña		
1959−1961	Club Atlètic Ibèria		
1961−1962	CE L'Hospitalet		
Total		161	(61)

International career
	Catalonia	1	(0)
1954	Spain	1	(0)
- * Club domestic league appearances and goals

Eduardo Manchón Molina (born 24 July 1930 in Barcelona, died there on 29 September 2010) was a Spanish footballer who played as a forward.

Although naturally left-footed, he was also adept with his right, and was capable of playing both as a striker and on the left wing.

Between 1950 and 1957 he scored 88 goals in 201 games for Barcelona, where he witnessed one of his most successful periods in his career. He belonged to the legendary "Five Cups-Barça" side, which won all five possible trophies in 1952. During his time with the club, he won La Liga twice, the Spanish Cup four times, the Copa Eva Duarte twice, and even the Latin Cup.

== Club career ==
Manchón, son of a hard-working family from Murcia, joined Barcelona at the age of 16. He first played for the Catalan club SD España Industrial, which was the reserve team of Barcelona at the time. In the fifth round of the 1950–51 La Liga season, Manchón made his league debut for the first team against Valencia and also managed to score his first goal for the club.

Together with László Kubala, César and Estanislau Basora, he formed one of the most dangerous front-lines in the club's history. In the 1951–52 season the club managed to win all five trophies (the Spanish Championship, the Spanish Cup, the Latin Cup, the Copa Eva Duarte, and the Trofeo Martini & Rossi).

After his time at Barça, he played for the first division side Granada CF during the 1957–58 season and later for Deportivo de La Coruña, Club Atlètic Ibèria and CE L'Hospitalet.

== International career ==
Manchon made one appearance for the Spanish national team in his career. This was during a qualifying match for the 1954 FIFA World Cup, a 0–1 defeat against Turkey. He also represented the Catalonia national football team.

== Death ==
After a long illness Manchón died on 29 September 2010 at the age of 80.

== Honours ==
Barcelona

- La Liga (2): 1952, 1953
- Copa del Generalísimo (4): 1951, 1952, 1953, 1957
- Copa Eva Duarte (2): 1952, 1953
- Latin Cup (1): 1952
