= Cheché Martín =

Spanish footballer, manager, and cartoonist (1926–2006)

Personal information
- Full name: José María Martín Rodríguez
- Date of birth: 25 April 1926
- Place of birth: A Coruña, Spain
- Date of death: 23 June 2006 (aged 82)
- Place of death: A Coruña, Spain
- Height: 1.76 m (5 ft 9 in)
- Position: Right back

Youth career
- Club Atlético Banfield

Senior career*
| Years | Team | Apps | (Gls) |
| 1943–1946 | Club Atlético Banfield | | |
| 1943–1946 | Deportivo Vasco de Caracas | | |
| 1946–1948 | Angers | | |
| 1948–1950 | Deportivo de La Coruña | | |
| 1950–1953 | Barcelona | | |
| 1953–1956 | Atlético Madrid | | |
| 1956–1958 | Valencia | | |
| 1958–1959 | Atlético Morelia | | |

International career
| 1952 | Spain | 1 | (0) |

Managerial career
- 1959–1961: Atlético Morelia
- 1961–1963: Deportivo Toluca
- 1963–1965: Atlético Morelia
- 1965–1966: Badajoz
- 1966–1968: Real Murcia
- 1968–1970: Deportivo de La Coruña
- 1970: Real Zaragoza
- 1971–1972: Real Murcia
- 1972–1973: Real Valladolid
- 1973–1974: Terrassa
- 1974–1975: Recreativo de Huelva
- 1976–1977: Deportivo de La Coruña
- * Club domestic league appearances and goals

José María Martín Rodríguez, better known as Cheché Martín (25 April 1924 – 23 June 2006), was a Spanish footballer who played as a right back for Barcelona, Atlético Madrid, and Valencia in the 1950s. After retiring, he became a manager, taking over the likes of Real Murcia, Deportivo de La Coruña, Real Zaragoza, and Real Valladolid in the 1960s and 1970s.

Outside football, he worked as a cartoonist and painter, achieving great acclaim.

== Early life ==
Born in the Galician town of A Coruña on 25 April 1926, (Note: Some sources wrongly state that he was born on 25 April 1924.) Martín began playing football at El Relleno as well as at Tram Terminal. During the outbreak of the Spanish Civil War in 1936, his father, a professor, city clerk, and secretary of Coruña, was executed by firing squad, after which he and his mother went into exile to Argentina. Skilled at drawing, he began earning a living by selling his cartoons and caricatures in bars and cafes, eventually becoming a cartoonist and illustrator for the magazine Austral.

== Playing career ==
=== Club career ===
Martín began his career at Club Atlético Banfield, from which he joined Deportivo Vasco de Caracas in 1943, where he stayed for three years, until 1946, when he moved to France. There, he signed for Angers, with whom he played for two years, until 1948, scoring a total of 2 goals in 10 Ligue 2 matches. He then returned to his hometown, where he signed for local club Deportivo de la Coruña, which he helped achieve a runner-up finish in the 1949–50 Liga, the club's best-ever result. He was noted for his elegant and precise defensive skills, possessing a fine shot from set pieces and a good head game, as well as the courage to join the attack with danger.

Having caught the attention of bigger clubs, Martín was signed by FC Barcelona in 1950, where he played for three seasons, until 1953. Together with Mariano Gonzalvo, László Kubala, and César, he was a member of the great Barça team of the early 1950s, which won two La Liga titles (1951–52 and 1952–53), one Latin Cup in 1952, two Copa Eva Duartes in 1952 and 1953, and a three-peat of Copa del Rey titles between 1951 and 1953, starting in the former two finals, in which he helped his side to victories over Real Sociedad (3–0) and his future club Valencia (4–2), respectively. On 29 June 1952, he started in the final of the 1952 Latin Cup, the forerunner of the European Cup, which ended in a 1–0 loss to Barcelona. In total, he scored 4 goals in 98 official goals. During his stay at Barça, he attended one of the first exhibitions of the young Antoni Tàpies, then unknown, purchasing him the only two paintings he had for 9,000 pesetas.

After leaving Barça in 1953, Martín joined Atlético Madrid, with whom he played for three years, until 1956, scoring a total of 4 goals in 68 official matches. In 1956, the 30-year-old Martín signed for Valencia, where he stayed for two years, being a regular during the first, but played only two matches in the second as he lost the coach's confidence following a serious injury. Therefore, at the end of the season, he left for Mexico, joining the ranks of Atlético Morelia, where he retired in 1959, aged 33. A few weeks earlier, Martín already had his contract at stake, so he went into the locker room of Santos FC to ask Pelé to take it easy during the friendly match that they were about to play.

In total, he scored 7 goals in 184 La Liga matches for Coruña, Barça, Atlético, and Valencia between 1948 and 1958.

=== International career ===
On 1 Jun 1952, the 26-year-old Martín earned his first (and only) international cap in a friendly match against the Republic of Ireland at the Chamartín in Madrid, helping his side keep a clean-sheet in a 6–1 victory.

== Managerial career ==
After retiring, Martín remained linked to Atlético Morelia, now as a coach, which he oversaw for two years, from 1959 until 1961, when he took over Deportivo Toluca, where he also stayed for two years, as he then returned to Morelia in 1963. In 1965, he returned to Spain, where he coached several clubs in the late 1960s, such as Badajoz (1965–66), Real Murcia (1965–68), and Deportivo (1968–70). In the early 1970s, he achieved three promotions to the Tercera División: Real Murcia (1972), Terrassa (1974), and Recreativo de Huelva (1975). His last managerial role was at the helm of his hometown club Deportivo between 1975 and 1977.

== Later life and death ==
After leaving the world of football, Martín dedicated himself professionally to painting, achieving great acclaim. In 2005, journalist and writer Arturo Lezcano published a book called Cheché Martín, Fútbol sobre Lenzo ("Cheché Martín, Football over Lenzo"), which chronicles his sporting, artistic, and personal career; at the book's presentation, Lezcano described him as "a footballer with the soul of a painter".

Martín died in A Coruña on 23 June 2006, at the age of 80. Following his death, Arsenio Iglesias, who served as his second-in-command at Deportivo, described him as "a great friend and a very intelligent coach, one of those who sees football quickly and always has imaginative solutions".

== Honours ==
=== As a player ===
Deportivo de la Coruña

- La Liga
  - Runners-up: 1949–50

FC Barcelona

- La Liga
  - Champions (2): 1951–52 and 1952–53
- Copa del Rey
  - Champions (3): 1951, 1952, and 1953
- Latin Cup
  - Champions (1): 1952
- Copa Eva Duarte
  - Champions (2): 1952 and 1953
