= Antoni Ramallets =

Spanish footballer

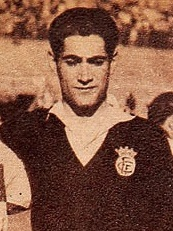
- Ramallets in 1950

Personal information
- Full name: Antoni Ramallets Simón
- Date of birth: 1 July 1924
- Place of birth: Barcelona, Spain
- Date of death: 30 July 2013 (aged 89)
- Place of death: Vilafranca del Penedès, Spain
- Height: 1.82 m (6 ft 0 in)
- Position: Goalkeeper

Youth career
- 1941–1942: Europa

Senior career*
Years	Team	Apps	(Gls)
1942–1944	San Fernando		
1944–1946	Mallorca	39	(0)
1946–1962	Barcelona	288	(0)
1946–1947	→ Valladolid (loan)		

International career
1950–1961	Spain	35	(0)
1948–1960	Catalonia	7	(0)

Managerial career
- 1962–1963: Valladolid
- 1963–1964: Zaragoza
- 1964: Murcia
- 1965–1966: Valladolid
- 1966: Logroñés
- 1968: Hércules
- 1968–1969: Ilicitano
- * Club domestic league appearances and goals

Antoni Ramallets Simón (1 July 1924 – 30 July 2013) was a Spanish football goalkeeper and manager.

He spent most of his career at FC Barcelona, during the 1950s and early 1960s, winning the Ricardo Zamora Trophy as the best goalkeeper in La Liga on five occasions, and 18 major club honours.

He represented Spain in the 1950 FIFA World Cup and, in the 1960s, managed several clubs in his country, notably winning two major trophies with Real Zaragoza.

== Club career ==
Ramallets signed for FC Barcelona in 1946 at the age of 23, from Real Valladolid, where he also spent his first season after being purchased, on loan. He returned to the club to play second-fiddle to Juan Velasco, making his La Liga debut in a 2–1 win against Sevilla FC, on 28 November 1948. Although this was his only appearance during the season, he eventually became the starter, being an essential defensive unit as his team - then named Club de Fútbol Barcelona - went on to win six leagues and five domestic cups; in the 1951–52 campaign, as Barça won five major trophies, he contributed with 28 league games, being awarded his first Ricardo Zamora Trophy.

During the 1950s, Ramallets was a prominent member of the successful Barcelona side that also included Joan Segarra, Marià Gonzalvo, László Kubala, Sándor Kocsis, Evaristo, Luis Suárez and Zoltán Czibor. During his spell with the club he made 538 appearances, including 288 in the domestic league; on 6 March 1962 the Blaugrana played a testimonial in his honour against Hamburger SV, winning 5–1.

Ramallets reached the 1961 European Cup final with Barcelona, in which he scored a controversial own goal. With the score tied, referee Gottfried Dienst awarded Benfica a goal when a misplaced defensive header drifted back towards the Barcelona goalkeeper, who – dazzled by the sun – could only push the ball against the crossbar, and it subsequently bounced along his goal line; Benfica ultimately won the match 3–2.

Ramallets coached several teams over the following decade, including old acquaintance Valladolid. In the 1963–64 campaign he led Real Zaragoza to the fourth place in the league, the Spanish Cup and the Inter-Cities Fairs Cup – a competition he had won twice as a player with Barcelona – defeating fellow league team Valencia CF in the latter.

== International career ==
Ramallets played 35 games for Spain during 11 years, making his debut against Chile on 29 June 1950, during the 1950 FIFA World Cup in Brazil. During the tournament he earned the nickname The Cat of Maracanã, helping the nation to the second group stage.

Ramallets also played seven games for the unofficial Catalan national side.

== Death ==
Ramallets died in his Vilafranca del Penedès home near Barcelona, on 31 July 2013. He was 89 years old.

== Honours ==
=== Player ===
==== Club ====
Barcelona

- La Liga: 1947–48, 1948–49, 1951–52, 1952–53, 1958–59, 1959–60
- Copa del Generalísimo: 1951, 1952, 1952–53, 1957, 1958–59
- Copa Eva Duarte: 1948, 1952, 1953
- Inter-Cities Fairs Cup: 1955–58, 1958–60
- Latin Cup: 1949, 1952
- Small Club World Cup: 1957

==== Individual ====
- Ricardo Zamora Trophy: 1951–52, 1955–56, 1956–57, 1958–59, 1959–60

=== Manager ===
Zaragoza

- Copa del Generalísimo: 1963–64
- Inter-Cities Fairs Cup: 1963–64
