= César Rodríguez (footballer, born 1920) =

Spanish footballer and manager

Personal information
- Full name: César Rodríguez Álvarez
- Date of birth: 6 July 1920
- Place of birth: León, Spain
- Date of death: 1 March 1995 (aged 74)
- Place of death: Barcelona, Spain
- Height: 1.72 m (5 ft 7 1/2 in)
- Position: Forward

Youth career
- SEU León

Senior career*
Years	Team	Apps	(Gls)
1939–1955	Barcelona	287	(190)
1940–1942	→ Granada (loan)	24	(23)
1955	→ España Industrial (loan)	9	(8)
1955–1956	Cultural Leonesa	15	(3)
1956–1957	Perpignan	13	(4)
1957–1960	Elche	80	(42)
Total		428	(312)

International career
1943–1954	Catalan XI	10	(5)
1945–1952	Spain	12	(6)

Managerial career
- 1959–1960: Elche
- 1960–1963: Zaragoza
- 1963–1964: Barcelona
- 1965–1966: Mallorca
- 1966–1967: Celta
- 1967: Betis
- 1968–1969: Zaragoza
- 1969–1970: Hércules
- 1971: Hércules (caretaker)
- 1975–1976: San Andrés
- * Club domestic league appearances and goals

César Rodríguez Álvarez (6 July 1920 – 1 March 1995), sometimes known as just César, was a Spanish football forward and manager.

During his career, which spanned more than two decades, he played mainly for Barcelona, appearing in 351 official matches and scoring 232 goals (previously counted as 235), making him the highest goalscorer in the club's history for several decades, until he was passed by Lionel Messi. He won five La Liga championships with the team in a total of 13 major trophies, and was renowned for his ability to score from corners.

César represented Spain at the 1950 World Cup. After retiring, he managed both Zaragoza and Barcelona amongst several other professional teams.

== Club career ==
=== Barcelona ===
Rodríguez was born in León, Castile and León, and joined FC Barcelona in 1939. However, military service saw him being relocated to Granada and Granada CF the following year, and he played two seasons on loan in Andalusia, helping the club promote to La Liga for the first time ever then adding 23 goals in only 24 games in the following season for a final tenth position – out of 14 teams, good enough for league status preservation; this included six in a 7–3 home win against CD Castellón, on 22 March 1942. He also scored the first ever Granada goal in La Liga on 28 September 1941 in a 1:1 draw.

César returned to Barcelona in 1942, winning his first national championship in 1944–45, to which conquest he contributed with 15 goals in 24 matches. During his 13-year stint in Catalonia he scored in double digits in 11 seasons, surpassing the 20-goal mark in three. His early teammates included, among others, Antoni Ramallets, Juan Velasco, Josep Escolà, Joan Segarra, Estanislau Basora, José Gonzalvo and Mariano Gonzalvo; in 1949 he won his first and only Pichichi Trophy (28 goals) and, two years later, he scored twice in the 3–0 win over Real Sociedad in the Copa del Generalísimo final.

Subsequently, Rodríguez was part of a legendary Barcelona forward line alongside Basora, László Kubala, Eduardo Manchón and Moreno that helped the club win five trophies during the 1951–52 season. He scored again in the domestic cup final, a 4–2 extra time win against Valencia CF, and netted the only goal in the Latin Cup triumph over OGC Nice of France.

=== Later years / Management ===
After leaving Barcelona at the age of 35, César had spells at Cultural y Deportiva Leonesa – his only top flight relegation, in 1956 – and Perpignan FC in France, returning to his country with Elche CF and helping the Valencians move from Tercera División to the top level in only two years, acting as their player-coach in his last season. He scored 33 from only 25 appearances in the third division campaign.

Rodríguez retired from football in 1960 aged 40, with Spanish top division totals of 353 matches and 226 goals. In the competition's history, only three players – Telmo Zarra, Hugo Sánchez and Alfredo Di Stéfano – scored more.

Afterwards, César coached nine seasons in the top tier, mainly with Real Zaragoza, guiding the Aragonese to the third position in 1961, the fourth in 1962 and the fifth in 1963 and also reaching the domestic cup final in the latter campaign, losing against his former team Barcelona.

In the summer of 1963, César succeeded former teammate Josep Gonzalvo at the helm of Barça, being sacked only five games into the 1964–65 campaign. He suffered consecutive top flight relegations with RCD Mallorca and Real Betis, and his last professional job was with Zaragoza in 1968–69, leading the team to the 13th position, the first above the relegation zone. He died at the age of 74 in Barcelona, and his scoring record stood until 20 March 2012 (57 years) when Lionel Messi netted a hat-trick against Granada.

== International career ==
César won 12 caps for Spain during seven years, scoring six goals. He netted on his debut in a 2–2 draw with Portugal on 11 March 1945, and was included in the squad for 1950 FIFA World Cup in Brazil, being an unused member.

Rodríguez also appeared for the Catalan XI during more than one decade. On 19 October 1947, at the Estadi de Sarrià, he scored twice in a 3–1 win over the Spanish national side.

== Personal life ==
Rodríguez's older brother, Ricardo (known as Calo), was also a footballer. A defender, he played eight seasons in the top division in representation of three teams – including Barcelona, five years – appearing in 71 league matches.

César scored the first goal ever in the first division for both Granada and Leonesa.

== Career statistics ==
=== Club ===
Appearances and goals by club, season and competition
Club	Season	League		Cup		Europe		Other		Totals	
Club	Season	Apps	Goals	Apps	Goals	Apps	Goals	Apps	Goals	Apps	Goals
Granada	1941–42	24	23	5	3	–		–		29	26
Granada	Totals	24	23	5	3	–		–		29	26
Barcelona	1942–43	23	13	8	3	–		–		31	16
Barcelona	1943–44	26	12	4	1	–		–		30	13
Barcelona	1944–45	24	15	4	6	–		–		28	21
Barcelona	1945–46	26	12	2	0	–		1	2	29	14
Barcelona	1946–47	25	9	4	3	–		–		29	12
Barcelona	1947–48	19	19	2	0	–		–		21	19
Barcelona	1948–49	24	28	4	2	–		3	3	31	33
Barcelona	1949–50	23	17	2	3	–		0	0	25	20
Barcelona	1950–51	27	29	7	4	–		–		34	33
Barcelona	1951–52	24	21	7	5	–		3	1	34	27
Barcelona	1952–53	27	13	5	4	–		–		32	17
Barcelona	1953–54	15	2	7	5	–		–		22	7
Barcelona	1954–55	4	0	1	0	–		–		5	0
Barcelona	Totals	287	190	57	36	–		7	6	351	232
Cultural Leonesa	1955–56	15	3	–	–	–		–		15	3
Cultural Leonesa	Totals	15	3	–	–	–		–		15	3
Perpignan	1956–57	13	4	–	–	–		–		13	4
Perpignan	Totals	13	4	–	–	–		–		13	4
Elche	1957–58	25	33	–	–	–		–		25	33
Elche	1958–59	28	4	4	2	–		–		32	6
Elche	1959–60	27	5	9	6	–		–		36	11
Elche	Totals	80	42	13	8	–		–		93	50
Career totals		419	262	75	47	–		7	4	501	315

=== International goals ===
#	Date	Venue	Opponent	Score	Result	Competition
1	11 March 1945	Estádio Nacional, Lisbon, Portugal	Portugal	2–2	Draw	Friendly
2	6 May 1945	Riazor, A Coruña, Spain	Portugal	4–2	Win	Friendly
3	21 March 1948	Nuevo Chamartín, Madrid, Spain	Portugal	2–0	Win	Friendly
4	18 February 1951	Nuevo Chamartín, Madrid, Spain	Switzerland	6–3	Win	Friendly
5	1 June 1952	Nuevo Chamartín, Madrid, Spain	Republic of Ireland	6–0	Win	Friendly
6	28 December 1952	Nuevo Chamartín, Madrid, Spain	West Germany	2–2	Draw	Friendly

== Honours ==
=== Player ===
Barcelona

- La Liga: 1944–45, 1947–48, 1948–49, 1951–52, 1952–53
- Copa del Generalísimo: 1951, 1952, 1953
- Copa Eva Duarte: 1948, 1952, 1953
- Latin Cup: 1949, 1952

Granada

- Segunda División: 1940–41

Elche

- Segunda División: 1958–59
- Tercera División: 1957–58

=== Manager ===
Zaragoza

- Copa del Generalísimo: Runner-up 1962–63

Hércules

- Tercera División: 1969–70

=== Individual ===
- Pichichi Trophy: 1948–49
