= 1952 Latin Cup =

1952 club football tournament

Coupe Latine 1952

Tournament details
- Host country: France
- Dates: 24–29 June 1952
- Teams: 4 (from 1 confederation)
- Venue: 1 (in 1 host city)

Final positions
- Champions: Barcelona (2nd title)
- Runners-up: Nice
- Third place: Juventus
- Fourth place: Sporting CP

Tournament statistics
- Matches played: 4
- Goals scored: 18 (4.5 per match)
- Top scorers: (Italy) Giampiero Boniperti; (3 goals)

The 1952 Latin Cup (French: Coupe Latine 1952) was the fourth edition of the annual Latin Cup which was played by clubs of the Southwest European nations of France, Italy, Portugal, and Spain. The tournament was hosted by France, and the Spanish club Barcelona was the winner of the tournament after defeating Nice by a score of 1–0 in the final match.

== Participating teams ==
Team	Method of qualification	Previous appearances
Nice	1951–52 French Division 1 champions	Debut
Juventus	1951–52 Serie A champions	Debut
Sporting CP	1951–52 Primeira Divisão champions	1949, 1951
Barcelona	1951–52 La Liga champions	1949

== Venues ==
The host of the tournament was France, and all matches were played in one host stadium.

Paris	1952 Latin Cup is located in France
Parc des Princes	1952 Latin Cup is located in France
Capacity: 38,000	1952 Latin Cup is located in France
Parc des Princes	1952 Latin Cup is located in France

== Tournament ==
=== Bracket ===
Semifinals
24 June – Paris
Barcelona	4
Juventus	2
25 June – Paris
Nice	4
Sporting CP	2

Final
28 June – Paris
Barcelona	1
Nice	0
Third place match
29 June – Paris
Juventus	3
Sporting CP	2

=== Semifinals ===
24 June 1952

Barcelona	4–2	Juventus
Manchón 3'; Basora 24', 56'; Kubala 51' (pen.)		Boniperti 41', 82'

Parc des Princes, Paris, France
Referee: Raymond Vincenti (France)

25 June 1952

Nice	4–2	Sporting CP
Carré 8', ?'; Carniglia 20'; Courteaux 43'		Alves 62'; Albano 64'

Parc des Princes, Paris, France
Referee: Ricardo Pieri (Italy)

=== Third place match ===
28 June 1952

Juventus	3–2	Sporting CP
Boniperti 5'; Hansen 7'; Vivolo 15'		Martins 30', 78'

Parc des Princes, Paris, France
Referee: Manuel Asensi Martín (Spain)

=== Final ===
29 June 1952

Barcelona	1–0	Nice
Rodríguez 80'

Parc des Princes, Paris, France
Referee: Reis Santos (Portugal)

Barcelona	Nice

GK	(Spain) Antoni Ramallets
DF	(Spain) Cheché Martín
DF	(Spain) Gustau Biosca
DF	(Spain) Josep Seguer
MF	(Spain) Andreu Bosch
MF	(Spain) Emilio Aldecoa
FW	(Spain) Jaime Escudero
FW	(Spain) Eduardo Manchón
FW	(Spain) Estanislao Basora
FW	(Spain) César Rodríguez
FW	(Hungary) László Kubala
Manager:
(Czechoslovakia) Ferdinand Daučík

GK	(France) Marcel Domingo
DF	(France) Guy Poitevin
DF	(Argentina) Pancho González
DF	(France) Alphonse Martínez
DF	(France) Mohamed Firoud
MF	(France) Antoine Bonifaci
MF	(France) Abdelaziz Ben Tifour
FW	(France) Jean Belver
FW	(France) Désiré Carré
FW	(France) Jean Courteaux
FW	(Luxembourg) Victor Nurenberg
Manager:
(France) Numa Andoire

1952 Latin Cup Champions
(Francoist Spain)
Barcelona
2nd title

== Goalscorers ==
Rank	Player	Team	Goals
1	(Italy) Giampiero Boniperti	(Italy) Juventus	3
2	(France) Désiré Carré	(France) Nice	2
2	(Portugal) João Martins	(Portugal) Sporting CP	2
2	(Spain) Estanislau Basora	(Spain) Barcelona	2
3	(Spain) César Rodríguez	(Spain) Barcelona	1
3	(Spain) Eduardo Manchón	(Spain) Barcelona	1
3	(Hungary) László Kubala	(Spain) Barcelona	1
3	(Italy) Pasquale Vivolo	(Italy) Juventus	1
3	(Denmark) Karl Hansen	(Italy) Juventus	1
3	(France) Jean Courteaux	(France) Nice	1
3	(Argentina) Luis Carniglia	(France) Nice	1
3	(Portugal) Veríssimo Alves	(Portugal) Sporting CP	1
3	(Portugal) Albano	(Portugal) Sporting CP	1
