= Ferdinand Daučík =

Slovak footballer and manager

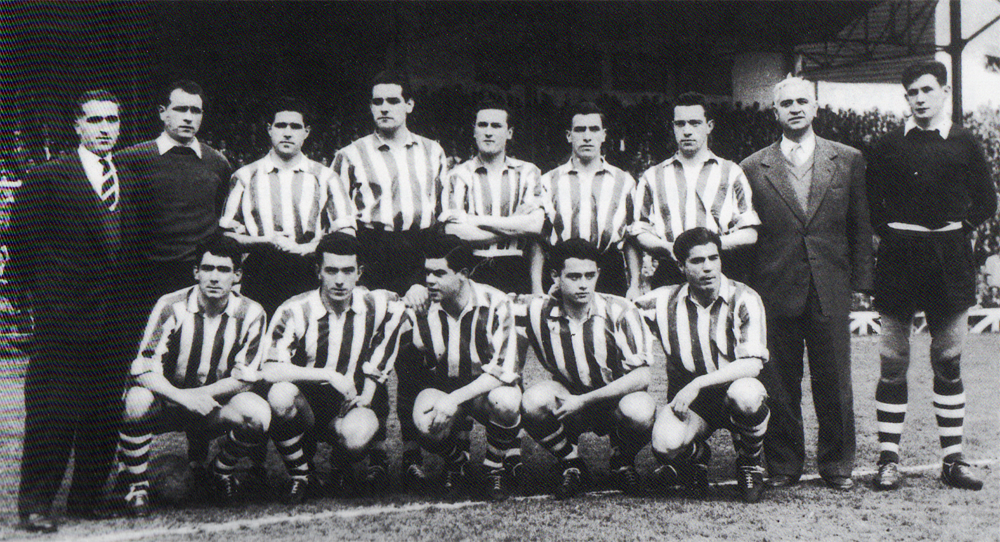
- Daučík (standing, second from right) as head coach of Athletic Bilbao in 1956.

Personal information
- Full name: Ferdinand Daučík
- Date of birth: 30 May 1910
- Place of birth: Šahy, Austria-Hungary
- Date of death: 14 November 1986 (aged 76)
- Place of death: Alcalá de Henares, Spain
- Position: Defender

Senior career*
Years	Team	Apps	(Gls)
- KFC Komárno
1928–1933	1. ČsŠK Bratislava		
1933–1942	Slavia Prague		

International career
1931–1938	Czechoslovakia	15	(0)
1942	Slovakia	1	(0)

Managerial career
- 1942–1946: ŠK Bratislava
- 1942–1944: Slovakia
- 1948: Czechoslovakia
- 1948: ŠK Bratislava
- 1949: Sokol Prievidza
- 1949–1950: Hungaria
- 1950–1954: Barcelona
- 1954–1957: Athletic Bilbao
- 1957–1959: Atlético Madrid
- 1959–1960: Porto
- 1960–1962: Real Betis
- 1963–1964: Real Murcia
- 1964–1965: Sevilla
- 1966–1967: Real Zaragoza
- 1967–1968: Toronto Falcons
- 1968: Elche
- 1968–1969: Real Betis
- 1969–1970: Sant Andreu
- 1970–1971: Espanyol
- 1971: Cádiz
- 1973–1974: Sant Andreu
- 1974–1975: Levante
- 1975: Levante
- 1976–1977: Sant Andreu
- Moscardó
Medal record
Representing Czechoslovakia
Men's Football
FIFA World Cup
Runner-up	1934 Italy
- * Club domestic league appearances and goals

Ferdinand Daučík (also known as Fernando Daucik; 30 May 1910 – 14 November 1986) was a Slovak football player and manager. Daučík was the manager of several La Liga clubs, most notably Barcelona, Athletic Club de Bilbao, Atlético Madrid and Real Zaragoza. During his career, he managed La Liga clubs in 488 matches, won three La Liga titles and won the Copa del Generalísimo on six occasions, including three La Liga/Copa doubles. He died in Alcalá de Henares.

== Playing career ==
Daučík played as a defender for 1. ČsŠK Bratislava, Slavia Prague and the Czechoslovakia national team. He was only the third Slovak player ever to play for Czechoslovakia. He was part of the squad at both the 1934 and 1938 FIFA World Cups, and although he didn't play in the 1934 tournament, he was the only Slovak to play in the 1938 competition.

== Management career ==
Daučík coached ŠK Bratislava between 1942 and 1946 and again in 1948. In 1948, he coached Czechoslovakia for two matches. After the 1948 Czechoslovak coup d'état, the Communist regime arrested Daučík for espionage. He spent two years in jail and later was interned in a prison camp in Nováky, where he coached a team composing of the prisoners. In late 1949 Daučík managed to flee the country by crossing the Morava River on an inflatable boat. Later that year, Daučík arrived in Spain as coach of Hungaria, a team made up of refugees fleeing the various Communist regimes of Eastern Europe. The team included his brother-in-law, Ladislao Kubala, who had married Daučík's sister, Anna Viola Daučík, in 1947. Hungaria played a series of friendlies against Madrid Select XI, a Spain XI and Español and during these matches, Kubala was spotted by Josep Samitier, then chief scout at Barcelona. Kubala was offered a contract and as part of the deal, Daučík became Barcelona coach in 1950.

=== CF Barcelona ===
Daučík coached Barcelona during one of the club's most successful periods. As well as Nicolae Simatoc–Kubala, the team also included Juan Zambudio Velasco, Antoni Ramallets and Joan Segarra. During his four seasons in charge, the club won two consecutive La Liga/Copa del Generalísimo doubles in 1952 and 1953. In 1952, Barcelona won five different trophies, including La Liga, the Copa del Generalísimo, the Copa Latina and the Copa Eva Duarte. His contract ended in 1954 and after clashing with some players, he left the club.

=== Athletic Bilbao ===
Daučík subsequently joined Athletic Bilbao, where he won the Copa del Generalísimo in 1955 and his third Liga/Copa del Generalísimo double in 1956. With a squad that included Agustín Gaínza, Armando Merodio and Jesús Garay, Daučík then led Athletic to the 1956 Latin Cup final and to the quarter-finals of the European Cup in 1957. En route to the final, they eliminated Porto and Honvéd before losing 6–5 on aggregate to Manchester United.

=== Atlético Madrid ===
The 1957–58 season saw Daučík take charge of Atlético Madrid and lead them to second place in La Liga. This resulted in Atlético qualifying for the 1958–59 seasons European Cup since the winners, Real Madrid, were also the reigning European champions. Inspired by Vavá and Enrique Collar, Atlético reached the semi-finals after beating Drumcondra FC, CSKA Sofia and Schalke 04. In the semi-finals, they met Real Madrid, who won the first leg 2–1 at the Santiago Bernabéu Stadium while Atlético won 1–0 at the Metropolitano. If away goals had counted double, Atlético would have progressed to the final. However, the tie went to a replay and Real won 2–1 in Zaragoza.

=== Later years ===
Daučík remained in demand as a manager throughout his career. After leaving Atlético Madrid in 1959, he had a spell at Porto during the 1959–60 season. He then spent two years at Real Betis between 1960 and 1962. While there, he gave a La Liga debut to his son Yanko Daucik. Daučík then had a season each with Real Murcia and Sevilla before he joined Real Zaragoza in 1966. He took over Real towards the end of the 1965–66 season, leading them to victory in the Copa del Generalísimo final when they beat Atlético Bilbao 2–0. They also reached the Inter-Cities Fairs Cup final, but after beating Barcelona 1–0 in the home-leg, Real eventually lost 4–3 on aggregate.

In 1967, Daučík moved to Canada to coach the Toronto Falcons of the National Professional Soccer League. This proved to be something of a family reunion as he was joined at the club by his son Yanko, son-in-law Ladislao Kubala and grandson Branko Kubala. After returning to Spain, he had spells at Elche, Espanyol and Colonia Moscardó, among others. A book about him, "Útek na lavičku Barcelony" (Escape to the Bench of Barcelona), was published in 2017 by Slovak football writer Mojmír Staško.

== Honours ==
Barcelona

- La Liga: 1951–52, 1952–53
- Copa del Generalísimo: 1951, 1952, 1953
- Copa Eva Duarte: 1951–52, 1952–53 (both awarded automatically for winning the domestic double)
- Latin Cup: 1952

Athletic Bilbao

- La Liga: 1955–56
- Copa del Generalísimo: 1955, 1956
- Latin Cup runner–up: 1956

Zaragoza

- Copa del Generalísimo: 1966
- Inter-Cities Fairs Cup runner-up: 1966
