= Josep Seguer =

Spanish footballer and manager

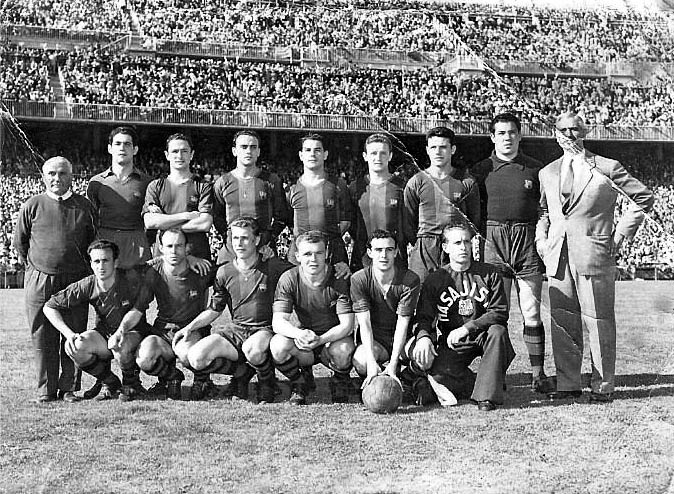

Personal information
- Full name: Josep Seguer Sans
- Date of birth: 6 May 1923
- Place of birth: Parets del Vallès, Spain
- Date of death: 1 January 2014 (aged 90)
- Place of death: Reus, Spain
- Height: 1.70 m (5 ft 7 in)
- Position: Defender

Youth career
- Parets
- 1940–1942: Barcelona

Senior career*
Years	Team	Apps	(Gls)
1942–1957	Barcelona	215	(38)
1942–1943	→ Granollers (loan)		
1957–1959	Betis	18	(0)
1959–1961	Manresa		

International career
1952	Spain	4	(0)

Managerial career
- 1959: Betis (player-coach)
- 1959–1961: Manresa (player-coach)
- 1961–1964: Barcelona (amateurs)
- 1964–1966: Lleida
- 1967–1969: Terrassa
- 1969: Barcelona
- 1969–1970: Condal
- 1970–1972: Barcelona B
- 1972–1973: Badalona
- 1973: Manresa
- 1975–1976: Júpiter
- 1976–1977: Tortosa
- 1977–1978: Terrassa
- 1978–1980: Villarreal
- 1980: Figueres
- 1981–1982: Gavà
- 1982–1983: La Cava
- 1983: Reus
- * Club domestic league appearances and goals

Josep Seguer Sans (6 May 1923 – 1 January 2014) was a Spanish football defender and manager.

== Playing career ==
Born in Parets del Vallès, Barcelona, Catalonia, Seguer played 14 La Liga seasons with FC Barcelona, becoming a senior in 1942 and being immediately loaned to neighbours EC Granollers. During his spell with his main club he appeared in 470 games all competitions comprised, scoring 133 goals and being part of the Cinc Copes (Five Cups) squads, dubbed as such due to the five titles won during the 1952–53 campaign, including the domestic double.

Seguer won four caps for Spain, all in 1952. He made his debut on 1 June in a 6–0 friendly win against the Republic of Ireland, in Madrid. He closed out his career in 1961 at 38 after player-coach spells with Real Betis and CE Manresa, the latter side in his native region.

== Coaching career ==
In 1961, Seguer became a full-time manager, his first job being with the amateur teams of Barcelona. For the following two decades he worked at every level of Spanish football, coaching professionally with Betis, UE Lleida, Barcelona, FC Barcelona B and Terrassa FC.

With the Blaugrana's main squad, Seguer acted as caretaker manager between Salvador Artigas and English Vic Buckingham, being in charge for 13 official matches and winning six including his last, 1–0 at home over Real Madrid on 28 December 1969.

== Death ==
Seguer died on 1 January 2014 in Reus, Province of Tarragona. He was 90 years old.

== Honours ==
Barcelona

- La Liga: 1944–45, 1947–48, 1948–49, 1951–52, 1952–53
- Copa del Generalísimo: 1951, 1952, 1952–53
- Copa Eva Duarte: 1948, 1952, 1953
- Latin Cup: 1949, 1952

Betis

- Segunda División: 1957–58
