= Désiré Carré =

French footballer (1923–2014)

Personal information
- Full name: Désiré Jean Carré
- Date of birth: 21 May 1923
- Place of birth: Courcelles-sur-Seine, Eure, France
- Date of death: 8 September 2014 (aged 91)
- Place of death: Draguignan, Var, France
- Height: 1.74 m (5 ft 9 in)
- Position: Midfielder

Senior career*
Years	Team	Apps	(Gls)
1945–1947	Le Havre		
1947–1952	Nice		
1952–1955	Strasbourg		
1955–1957	CA Paris		

International career
1949	France	1	(0)

Managerial career
- 1957–1958: Tours
- * Club domestic league appearances and goals

Désiré Jean Carré (21 May 1923 – 8 September 2014) was a French footballer who played as a midfielder for Le Havre, Nice, and Strasbourg between 1945 and 1955. He also played one match for the French national team in the 1949.

== Playing career ==
=== Club career ===
Born on 21 May 1923 in the Eure town of Courcelles-sur-Seine, Carré began his football career at Le Havre in 1945, aged 22, with whom he played for two years, until 1947, when he was signed by Nice, then in the Second Division. He was quick to adapt to his new team as he scored 20 goals in 34 matches in his first season there, thus playing a crucial role in helping Nice win the 1947–48 French Division 2.

Together with Victor Nurenberg, Luis Carniglia, and Abdelaziz Ben Tifour, he was a member of the great Nice team of the early 1950s that won back-to-back Ligue 1 titles in 1950–51 and 1951–52, as well as the 1951–52 Coupe de France, although he did not play in the cup final, which came as a surprise since he was the team's captain at the time; he was replaced by Luis Carniglia, who went on to score a goal in a 5–3 win over Girondins de Bordeaux. Having scored a goal in his league debut for Nice, against Angers, Carré also in his last league match for the club on 25 May 1952, against Olympique de Marseille. On 29 June 1952, he started in the final of the 1952 Latin Cup, the forerunner of the European Cup, which ended in a 1–0 loss to Barcelona.

A few weeks later, Carré left the club to join the ranks of Strasbourg, with whom he played for three seasons, from 1952 until 1955, when he went to CA Paris, where he stayed for two years, until 1957, when he retired at the age of 34. in total, he scored 114 goals in 312 league matches.

=== International career ===
On 13 November 1949, the 26-year-old Carré made his first (and only) international cap for France in a friendly match against Czechoslovakia at Colombes, helping his side to a 1–0 victory. On the following day, the journalists of the French newspaper L'Équipe stated that he "did not justify his international promotion and seemed almost always timid".

== Managerial career ==
After his career as a player ended, Carré worked as a coach, taking over Tours for the 1957–58 season. After his football career, he pursued a career as a sports journalist at Nice-Matin, where he covered all sports.

== Death ==
Carré died in Draguignan, Var, on 8 September 2014, at the age of 91. Following his death, Nice paid him a tribute, making a minute's silence just before hosting Metz on Matchday 5 of Ligue 1.

== Career statistics ==
=== Club ===
Appearances and goals by club, season and competition
Club	Season	League		Cup		Other		Total	
Club	Season	Apps	Goals	Apps	Goals	Apps	Goals	Apps	Goals
Le Havre	1945–46	26	14	3	0			29	14
Le Havre	1946–47	36	7	4	1			40	8
OGC Nice	1947–48	34	20	5	5			39	25
OGC Nice	1948–49	24	10	3	0			27	10
OGC Nice	1949–50	33	18	1	0			35	18
OGC Nice	1950–51	32	6	4	3			36	9
OGC Nice	1951–52	30	10	5	3	2	0	35	13
RC Strasbourg	1952–53	31	5	5	0			36	5
RC Strasbourg	1953–54	28	11	4	2			32	13
RC Strasbourg	1954–55	0	0	0	0			0	0
CA Paris	1955–56	37	9	3	0			40	9
CA Paris	1956–57								
Total		311	110	37	14	2	0	349	124

== Honours ==
Nice

- Ligue 1:
  - Champions (1): 1950–51
- Ligue 2:
  - Champions (1): 1947–48
- Coupe de France:
  - Champions (1): 1952
- Latin Cup:
  - Runner-up (1): 1952
