= Statue of László Kubala =

2009 sculpture

Coordinates: 41°22′50″N 2°07′17″E

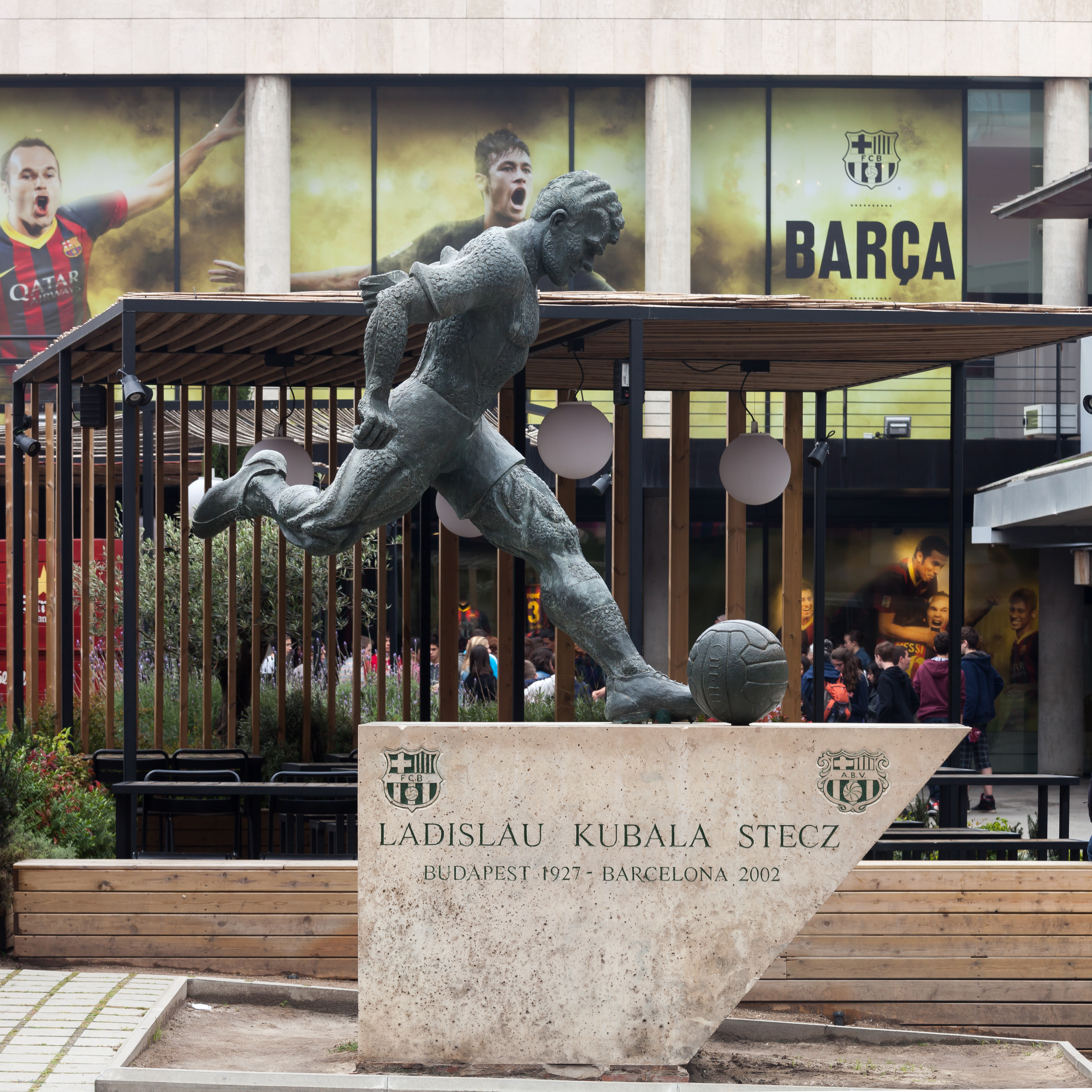

A statue of footballer László Kubala (1927–2002) was unveiled at FC Barcelona's Camp Nou stadium on 24 September 2009. It was sculpted by Montserrat García Rius.

== Background ==
László Kubala, born in Budapest, played for FC Barcelona between 1950 and 1961. During his time at the club, he helped them to honours including four La Liga titles, five national cups and two Inter-Cities Fairs Cups.

On 19 March 2009, the club announced the initiative for a statue of Kubala. The initiative was organised by the club's veterans' association, and was funded by fans with a minimum donation of €15, to be matched by the club. The inauguration was set for 15 June 2009, the anniversary of his signing in 1950. The statue was unveiled on 24 September 2009, the 52nd anniversary of the Camp Nou; the popularity of Kubala was one reason why Barcelona decided to build a bigger stadium than the previous Camp de Les Corts. On 17 May 2022, for the 20th anniversary of Kubala's death, the club held a service at the statue, led by president Joan Laporta.

== Description ==
The statue depicts Kubala ready to take a shot. The 2 metre bronze statue is on top of a 1.20 metre pedestal, bearing the names of all of Kubala's Barcelona teammates. The dedication to the teammates reads in Catalan "Tots els exits han estat possibles gracies als meus companys d'equip" (All successes have been possible thanks to my teammates). The name on the statue reads Ladislau Kubala Stecz, with the Catalan equivalent of Kubala's first names and the surnames of both his parents, as in the Spanish custom.

The statue was the first at the Camp Nou, and was accompanied by one of Johan Cruyff in 2019, and the announcement of one of Lionel Messi in 2025.
