= Karl Hansen (footballer, born 1942) =

Danish footballer

Personal information
- Date of birth: 10 October 1942 (age 84)

International career
Years	Team	Apps	(Gls)
1964–1965	Denmark	11	(0)

Karl Hansen (born 10 October 1942) is a Danish footballer. He played in eleven matches for the Denmark national football team from 1964 to 1965.
