= Courcelles-sur-Seine =

- Commune
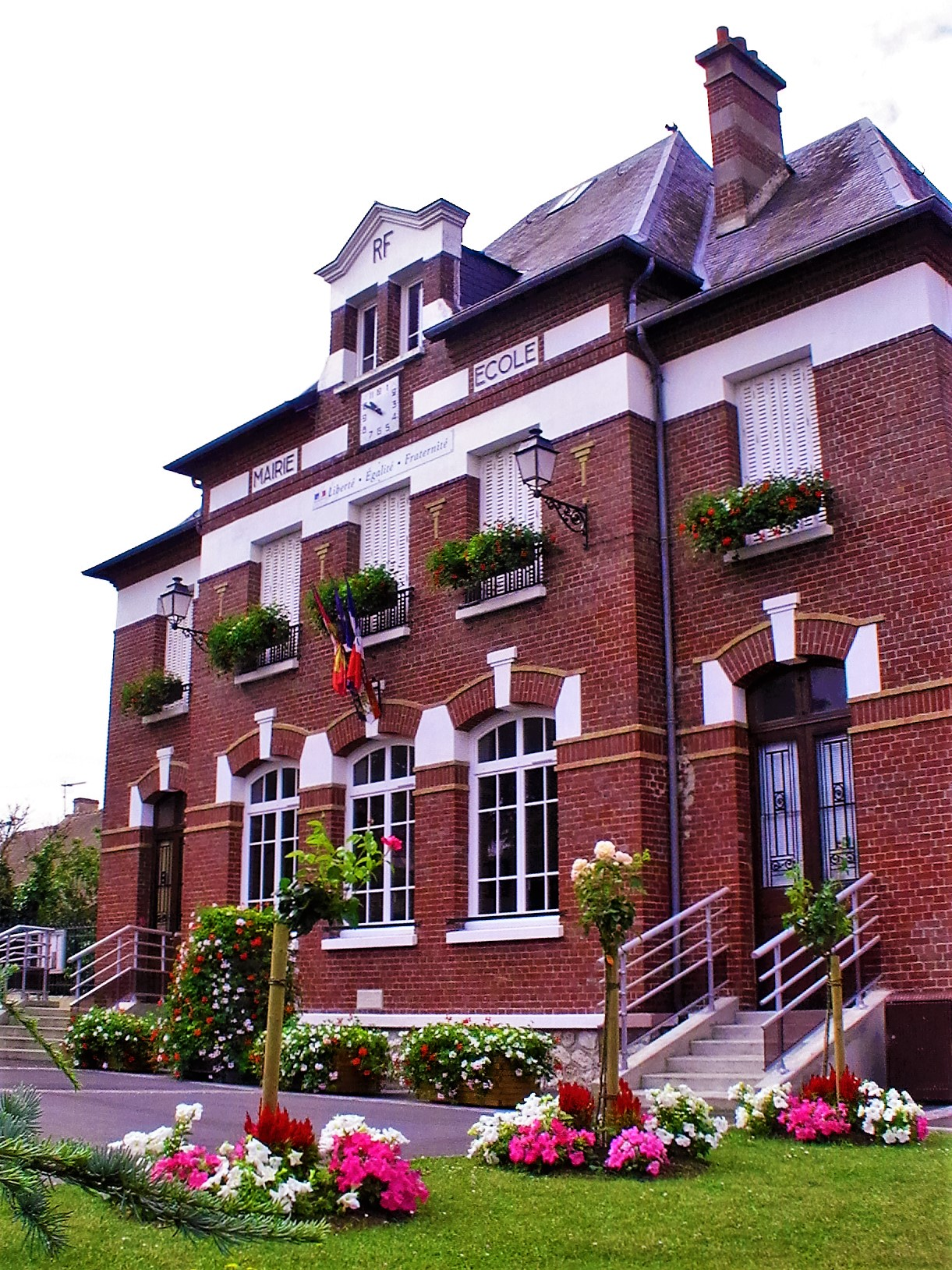
- The town hall in Courcelles-sur-Seine

- Coat of arms
- Location of Courcelles-sur-Seine
- Location within France Location within Normandy
- Coordinates: 49°11′01″N 1°21′34″E
- Country: France
- Region: Normandy
- Department: Eure
- Arrondissement: Les Andelys
- Canton: Gaillon
- Intercommunality: CA Seine-Eure

Government
  - Mayor (2020–2026): Joël Le Digabel
- Area^{1}: 5.47 km^{2} (2.11 sq mi)
- Elevation: 33 m (108 ft)
- Highest elevation: 127 m (417 ft)
- Lowest elevation: 8 m (26 ft)
- Population (2023): 2,167
  - Density: 396/km^{2} (1,030/sq mi)
- Time zone: UTC+01:00 (CET)
  - Summer (DST): UTC+02:00 (CEST)
- INSEE/Postal code: 27180 /27940
- ^{1} French Land Register data, which excludes lakes, ponds, glaciers > 1 km^{2} (0.386 sq mi or 247 acres) and river estuaries.

Courcelles-sur-Seine (French pronunciation: [kuʁsɛl syʁ sɛn], literally Courcelles on Seine) is a commune in the Eure department in northern France.

== Population ==
Historical population
| Year | Pop. | ±% p.a. |
|---|---|---|
| 1968 | 947 | — |
| 1975 | 1,098 | +2.14% |
| 1982 | 1,241 | +1.76% |
| 1990 | 1,569 | +2.97% |
| 1999 | 1,503 | −0.48% |
| 2007 | 1,580 | +0.63% |
| 2012 | 1,874 | +3.47% |
| 2017 | 2,040 | +1.71% |
| 2023 | 2,167 | +1.01% |
Source: INSEE

== See also ==
- Communes of the Eure department
