= Gustau Biosca =

Spanish footballer and manager

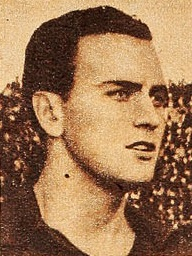
- Biosca in 1953

Personal information
- Full name: Gustau Biosca i Pagès
- Date of birth: 29 February 1928
- Place of birth: L'Hospitalet de Llobregat, Spain
- Date of death: 1 November 2014 (aged 86)
- Place of death: Barcelona, Spain
- Height: 1.74 m (5 ft 8 1/2 in)
- Position: Defender

Senior career*
Years	Team	Apps	(Gls)
1948–1949	España Industrial		
1949–1958	Barcelona	137	(3)
1958–1959	Condal	7	(0)
Total		146	(4)

International career
1956	Spain B	1	(0)
1951–1954	Spain	11	(0)

Managerial career
- 1970–1971: Pontevedra
- 1972–1973: Sant Andreu
- 1973: Real Valladolid
- 1974–1975: Sabadell
- 1976–1978: Spain U21
- 1978–1979: Terrassa
- * Club domestic league appearances and goals

Gustau Biosca i Pagès (29 February 1928 – 1 November 2014) was a Spanish football player and manager.

== Career ==
Born in L'Hospitalet de Llobregat, Barcelona, Catalonia, Biosca played as a defender for España Industrial, Barcelona and Condal.

He made his international debut for Spain in 1951, earning a total of 11 caps, including 2 in FIFA World Cup qualifying matches.

As a coach, he managed Pontevedra, Sant Andreu, Real Valladolid, Sabadell, the Spanish under-21 national team and Terrassa.

== Later life and death ==
Biosca died on 1 November 2014, at the age of 86.
