= László Kubala =

Association football player (1927–2002)

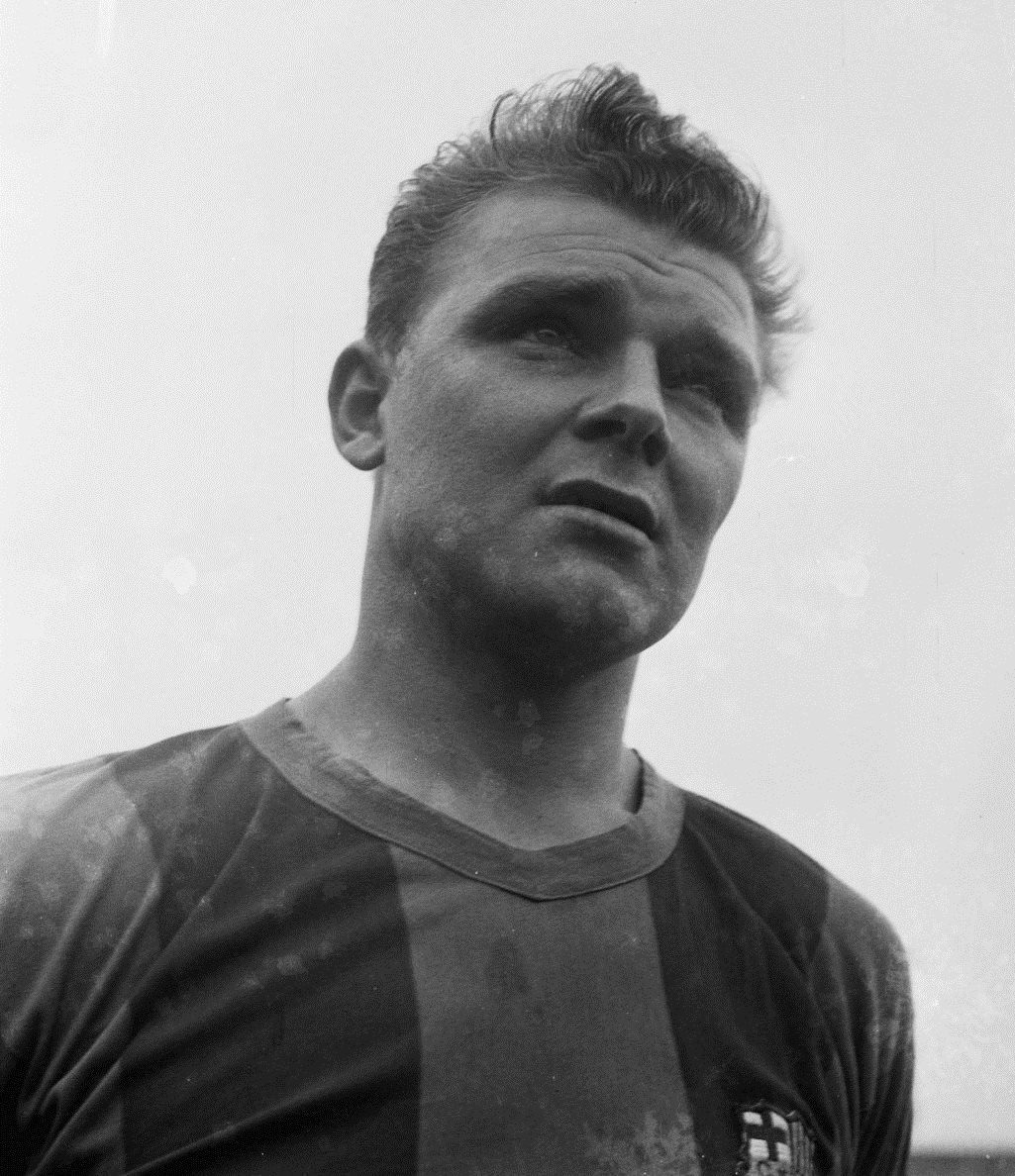
- Kubala with Barcelona in 1953

Personal information
- Date of birth: 10 June 1927
- Place of birth: Budapest, Hungary
- Date of death: 17 May 2002 (aged 74)
- Place of death: Barcelona, Spain
- Height: 1.76 m (5 ft 9 1/2 in)
- Position: Striker

Youth career
- 1939–1943: Ganz-MÁVAG SE

Senior career*
Years	Team	Apps	(Gls)
1944	Ganz TE	9	(2)
1945–1946	Ferencváros	49	(27)
1946–1948	Slovan Bratislava	33	(14)
1948–1949	Vasas	20	(10)
1949–1950	Pro Patria	16	(9)
1950	Hungária	6	(5)
1951–1961	Barcelona	186	(131)
1963	Toronto City	25	(18)
1963–1965	Espanyol	29	(7)
1966–1967	Zürich	12	(7)
1967	Toronto Falcons	19	(5)
Total		404	(235)

International career
1946–1947	Czechoslovakia	6	(4)
1948	Hungary	3	(0)
1953–1961	Spain	19	(11)
1953–1965	Europe XI	2	(3)
1954–1963	Catalonia	4	(4)

Managerial career
- 1961–1963: Barcelona
- 1963–1966: Espanyol
- 1966–1967: Zürich
- 1968: Toronto Falcons
- 1968–1969: Córdoba
- 1969–1980: Spain
- 1980: Barcelona
- 1982–1986: Al-Hilal
- 1986: Murcia
- 1987–1988: Málaga
- 1988–1989: Elche
- 1995: Paraguay
- * Club domestic league appearances and goals

László Kubala (10 June 1927 – 17 May 2002) was a professional footballer. He played as a forward for Ferencváros, Slovan Bratislava, Barcelona, and Espanyol, among other clubs. Regarded as one of the greatest players in history, Kubala is considered a hero of Barcelona. He was born in Hungary but also had Czechoslovak and Spanish citizenship, and played for the national teams of all three countries.

Kubala was noted for his quick and skilful dribbling, composed and powerful finishing, and accuracy from free kicks. During the 1950s, he was a leading member of the successful Barcelona team, scoring 280 goals in 345 appearances (including unofficial goals). During the club's 1999 centenary celebrations, a fan's poll declared Kubala the best player ever to play for the Spanish club. After retiring as a player, he had two spells as coach of Barcelona and also coached both Spain's senior national team and Spain national under-21 football team.

== Early life and career ==
=== Childhood and youth ===
Kubala was born in Budapest, as were his parents, who came from mixed backgrounds. His mother, Anna Stecz, a factory worker, had Polish and Slovak roots, while his father, Pál Kubala Kurjas, a bricklayer, was Slovak. Kubala described himself as a "cosmopolitan". He began his career as a junior player with Ganz TE, a factory team that played in the Hungarian third division. At the age of 11, he was playing in teams with other players who were three to five years older. At the age of 18, he signed for Ferencvárosi where he was a teammate of Sándor Kocsis. In 1946, Kubala moved to Czechoslovakia, allegedly to avoid military service, and joined Slovan Bratislava. In 1947, he married Anna Viola Daučíkova, the sister of the Czechoslovak national coach, Ferdinand Daučík. In 1948, Kubala returned to Hungary, again to allegedly avoid military service, and joined Vasas.

=== Refugee ===
In January 1949, as Hungary was occupied by the Soviet Union and became a communist satellite state, Kubala fled the country in the back of a truck. Initially, he arrived in the United States zone of Allied-occupied Austria and then moved on to Italy, where he played briefly for Pro Patria. In May 1949, he also agreed to play for Torino in a testimonial against Benfica, but pulled out after his son became ill. On the way back from Lisbon, the plane carrying the Torino team crashed into the Superga hills, killing all 31 people on board.

Meanwhile, the Hungarian Football Federation accused Kubala of breach of contract, leaving the country without permission, and failure to do military service. FIFA backed them and imposed a one-year international ban. In January 1950, Kubala, with Ferdinand Daučík as coach, formed his own team, Hungaria, which was made up of fellow refugees fleeing Eastern Europe. In the summer of 1950, the team arrived in Spain to play a series of friendlies against a Madrid XI, a Spain XI and Espanyol. They also played a friendly game against the legendary Millonarios led by Alfredo Di Stéfano.

During these games, Kubala was spotted by both Real Madrid and José Samitier, then chief scout at Barcelona. Kubala was offered a contract by Real but was persuaded by Samitier to sign for Barcelona. Samitier used his connections within the government of Francisco Franco to help arrange the transfer. Franco's government wanted to utilize Kubala's status as a refugee from one of the USSR's satellite countries to reinforce the regime's validity, thus helping Kubala obtain Spanish citizenship without delay. In the midst of the Cold War, Kubala's escape to the West was used as propaganda by Franco's government and was made into a successful film, The Stars Search for Peace, which saw Kubala and Samitier playing themselves.

=== Barcelona ===
Kubala signed for Barcelona on 15 June 1950, and as part of the deal, Ferdinand Daučík also became the Barcelona coach. However, the ban imposed on Kubala was still in place and he did not make his La Liga debut until 1951. He was permitted to play friendlies, and in two consecutive games against Frankfurter S.V., which Barcelona won 4–1 and 10–4, he scored six goals and assisted another five. He also played in the Copa del Generalísimo and helped the club win the trophy in 1951.

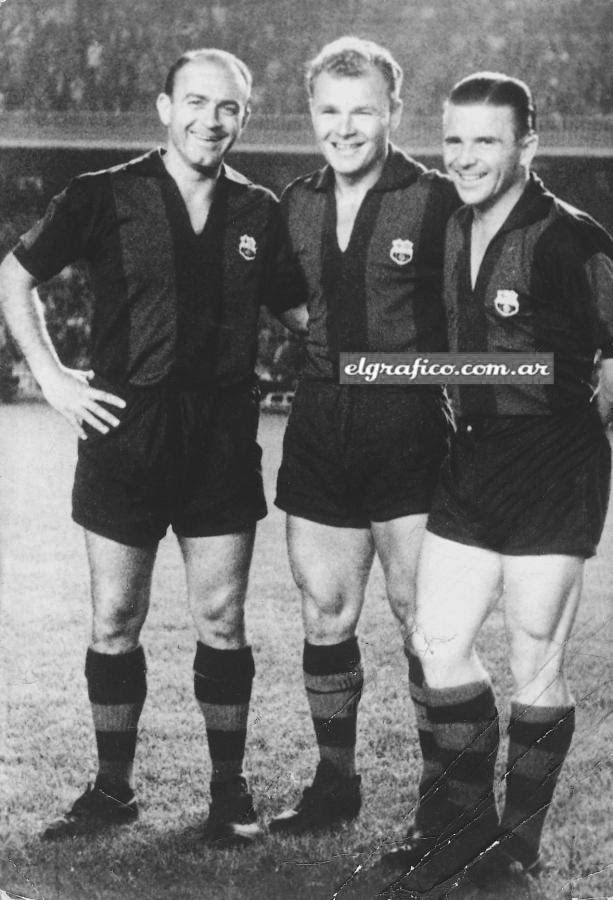
Kubala (center) with special guests Alfredo Di Stéfano (left) and Ferenc Puskás in a match held in his honour in 1961

In his first La Liga season, 1951–52, Kubala scored 26 goals in 19 games. This included 7 goals in a 9–0 win over Sporting de Gijón, five against Celta Vigo and hat-tricks against Sevilla and Racing Santander. His seven goals against Gijón remain the record for most goals scored in a single match in La Liga. He also scored in the Copa del Generalísimo final as Barcelona beat Valencia 4–2. This season proved to be one of the club's most successful. Coach Daučík and Kubala, together with players like Emilio Aldecoa, Velasco, Joan Segarra and Ramallets, inspired the team to win five trophies, including La Liga, the Copa del Generalísimo, the Latin Cup, and the Copa Eva Duarte. Kubala missed much of the 1952–53 season after contracting tuberculosis, which threatened to end his playing career. However, he made a miraculous recovery and returned to help Barcelona retain both La Liga and the Copa del Generalísimo. He also scored again in the Copa final win, a 2–1 win over Athletic Bilbao. During his time with Barcelona, he scored a total of 14 hat-tricks.

In 1958, Kubala persuaded two fellow Hungarian refugees Sándor Kocsis and Zoltán Czibor to join him at Barcelona. Together with a young Luis Suárez and Evaristo, they formed the nucleus of the team that won a La Liga / Copa del Generalísimo double in 1959 and a La Liga / Fairs Cup double in 1960. However, Kubala found himself out of favour with coach Helenio Herrera and lost his place in the team. As a result, he missed the 1960 European Cup semi-final against Real Madrid which Barcelona lost 6–2 on aggregate. The result saw Herrera lose his job and Kubala restored to the team. In the 1961 European Cup, Barcelona became the first club to beat Real Madrid in the competition. Inspired by Kubala they won 4–3 on aggregate and subsequently reached the final where they lost to Benfica 2–3. Kubala briefly retired as a player in 1961 and initially became a youth coach at Barcelona, before becoming coach of the senior team for the 1962–63 season. However, after losing a Fairs Cup game to Red Star Belgrade, he was dismissed. In the summer of 1963, he played abroad in the Eastern Canada Professional Soccer League with Toronto City.

== International career ==
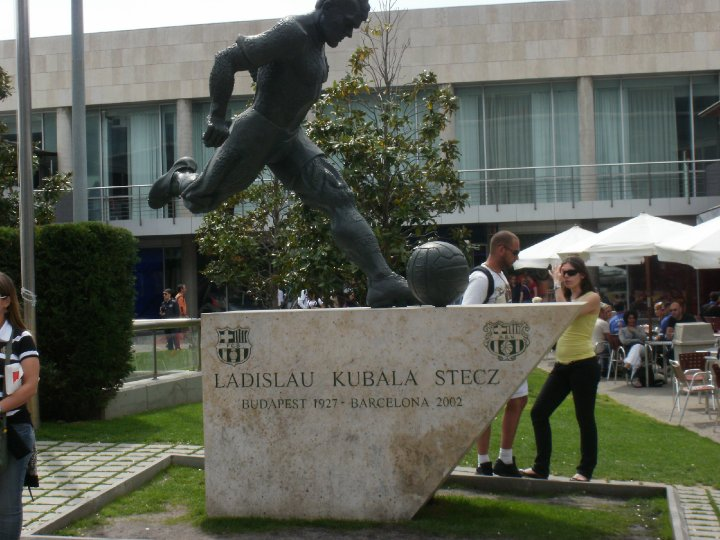
Statue of László Kubala in the grounds of the Camp Nou

Kubala played for three international teams – Czechoslovakia, Hungary and Spain. While playing with ŠK Slovan Bratislava, he appeared in six games and scored four goals for Czechoslovakia between 1946 and 1947. After returning to Budapest in 1948, he played three games for Hungary but failed to score. After adopting Spanish nationality, Kubala played 19 times and scored 11 goals for Spain between 1953 and 1961, being one of a small group to have played for the country having been born elsewhere. The highlight of his international career was a hat-trick for Spain against Turkey in 3–0 win in November 1957. Despite playing for three countries, Kubala never played in the finals of a major international tournament. He was included in the Spain squad for the 1962 World Cup but, along with Alfredo Di Stéfano, did not play due to injury.

As well as playing for three international teams, Kubala also played for both a Europe XI and the Catalan XI. On 21 October 1953, England played a Europe XI at Wembley Stadium to celebrate the 90th anniversary of the Football Association and Kubala scored twice in the 4–4 draw. He also played four games and scored four times for the Catalan XI. On 26 January 1955, in a game against Bologna at Les Corts, he was joined by guest player Alfredo Di Stéfano; the Catalan XI won 6–2 with two goals from Kubala and one from Di Stéfano. His last game for the Catalan XI was his own testimonial on 4 March 1993 at the Montjuïc Stadium against an International XI. He played the opening ten minutes of the game at age 65.

== Coaching career ==
After leaving Barcelona, Kubala accepted a contract as a player-coach with Espanyol and teamed up with Alfredo Di Stéfano. During his time at Espanyol, he gave a La Liga debut to his son, Branko. In 1966, he joined Zürich, again as player-coach, and made his last appearance in a European Cup game against the competition's eventual winners, Celtic. In 1967, Kubala went to Canada, where at Toronto Falcons he enjoyed something of family reunion with his father-in-law, Ferdinand Daučík, his brother-in-law, Yanko Daucik and his son Branko. He appeared in 19 matches for Toronto, scoring five times.

By the end of 1968, he had returned to La Liga, and after a brief spell at Córdoba, he became coach of the Spain national team. Kubala ended the team's eleven-year absence from the World Cup when he guided the team to the 1978 World Cup, but could not steer them through the first-round group stage. He also managed them at Euro 80, where they were again eliminated in the first round.

In 1980, he returned to Barcelona as a manager for a second short spell before moving to Saudi Arabia where he managed Al-Hilal. He subsequently managed three other La Liga clubs, including Málaga, whom he guided to the Segunda División title in 1988. His last coaching position was with Paraguay in 1995.

== Death ==
On 12 February 2002, Kubala was admitted to hospital in Barcelona with calcium deficiency. He died on 17 May, aged 74, from a degenerative brain condition. His funeral was held the following day at Santa Tecla church in the city, and was attended by Barcelona players past and present, and executives from rivals Real Madrid and Espanyol. He was buried in a private family ceremony at the Cementiri de les Corts, near the Camp Nou.

== Career statistics ==
=== Club ===
Appearances and goals by club, season and competition
Club	Season	League			Cup		Continental		Total	
Club	Season	Division	Apps	Goals	Apps	Goals	Apps	Goals	Apps	Goals
Ganz TE	1943–44	Nemzeti Bajnokság II	9	2					9	2
Ferencváros	1944	Nemzeti Bajnokság I								
Ferencváros	1945	Nemzeti Bajnokság I	22	19					22	19
Ferencváros	1945–46	Nemzeti Bajnokság I	27	14					27	14
Ferencváros	Total		49	33					49	33
Slovan Bratislava	1946–47	Czechoslovak First League	24	13					24	13
Slovan Bratislava	1947–48	Czechoslovak First League	9	1					9	1
Slovan Bratislava	Total		33	14					33	14
Vasas	1948–49	Nemzeti Bajnokság I	20	10					20	10
Vasas	1949–50	Nemzeti Bajnokság I	12	6					12	6
Vasas	Total		32	16					32	16
Pro Patria	1949–50	Serie A	16	9					16	9
Hungária	1950–51		6	5					6	5
Barcelona	1951–52	La Liga	19	26					19	26
Barcelona	1952–53	La Liga	11	7					11	7
Barcelona	1953–54	La Liga	28	23					28	23
Barcelona	1954–55	La Liga	19	14					19	14
Barcelona	1955–56	La Liga	25	14			3 (Note: Appearances in Inter-Cities Fairs Cup)	3	28	17
Barcelona	1956–57	La Liga	18	9	1	0			19	9
Barcelona	1957–58	La Liga	21	12					21	12
Barcelona	1958–59	La Liga	20	9			5	3	25	12
Barcelona	1959–60	La Liga	12	7			3 (Note: Appearances in European Cup)	6	15	13
Barcelona	1960–61	La Liga	13	10			9 (Note: Eight appearances and one goal in European Cup, one appearance in Inter-Cities Fairs Cup)	1	22	11
Barcelona	Total		186	131	1	0	20	13	207	144
Toronto City	1962	ECPSL								
Espanyol	1963–64	La Liga	29	7					29	7
Zürich	1965–66	Nationalliga A	12	7					12	7
Zürich	1966–67	Nationalliga A	0	0			1	0	1	0
Zürich	Total		12	7			1	0	13	7
Toronto Falcons	1967	NPSL	19	5					19	5
Career total			391	229	1	0	21	13	413	242

=== International ===
Appearances and goals by national team and year
National team	Year	Apps	Goals
Czechoslovakia	1946	1	0
Czechoslovakia	1947	5	4
Czechoslovakia	Total	6	4
Hungary	1948	3	0
Hungary	Total	3	0
Spain	1953	3	1
Spain	1954	1	0
Spain	1955	2	0
Spain	1956	4	4
Spain	1957	2	4
Spain	1958	3	2
Spain	1959	3	0
Spain	1960	0	0
Spain	1961	1	0
Spain	Total	19	11
Career total		28	15

- Kubala's team's score listed first, score column indicates score after each Kubala goal.

International goals by László Kubala
No.	Team	Date	Venue	Opponent	Score	Result	Competition	Ref
1	Czechoslovakia	31 August 1947	Stadion Letná, Prague, Czechoslovakia	Poland	3–0	6–3	Friendly	
2	Czechoslovakia	31 August 1947	Stadion Letná, Prague, Czechoslovakia	Poland	6–3	6–3	Friendly	
3	Czechoslovakia	21 September 1947	Bucharest, Romania	Romania	1–0	6–2	Friendly	
4	Czechoslovakia	21 September 1947	Bucharest, Romania	Romania	5–2	6–2	Friendly	
5	Spain	12 July 1953	Estadio Nacional, Santiago, Chile	Chile	2–0	2–1	Friendly	
6	Spain	30 January 1957	Estadio Chamartín, Madrid, Spain	Netherlands	3–0	5–1	Friendly	
7	Spain	8 May 1957	Hampden Park, Glasgow, Scotland	Scotland	1–1	2–4	1958 FIFA World Cup qualification	
8	Spain	26 May 1957	Santiago Bernabéu, Madrid, Spain	Scotland	2–0	4–1	1958 FIFA World Cup qualification	
9	Spain	6 November 1957	Santiago Bernabéu, Madrid, Spain	Turkey	1–0	3–0	Friendly	
10	Spain	6 November 1957	Santiago Bernabéu, Madrid, Spain	Turkey	2–0	3–0	Friendly	
11	Spain	6 November 1957	Santiago Bernabéu, Madrid, Spain	Turkey	3–0	3–0	Friendly	
12	Spain	24 November 1957	Stade Olympique de la Pontaise, Lausanne, Switzerland	Switzerland	1–0	4–1	1958 FIFA World Cup qualification	
13	Spain	24 November 1957	Stade Olympique de la Pontaise, Lausanne, Switzerland	Switzerland	4–1	4–1	1958 FIFA World Cup qualification	
14	Spain	13 March 1958	Parc des Princes, Paris, France	France	1–0	2–2	Friendly	
15	Spain	15 October 1958	Santiago Bernabéu, Madrid, Spain	Northern Ireland	2–0	6–2	Friendly	

== Honours ==
=== Player ===
Barcelona

- La Liga: 1951–52, 1952–53, 1958–59, 1959–60
- Copa del Generalísimo: 1951, 1952, 1953, 1957, 1959
- Inter-Cities Fairs Cup: 1955–58, 1958–60
- Latin Cup: 1952
- Copa Eva Duarte: 1952, 1953
- European Cup runner-up: 1960–61

Individual

- Ballon d'Or: fifth place 1957
- World XI: 1961

=== Manager ===
Málaga

- Segunda División: 1987–88
