= Copa Eva Duarte =

Defunct Spanish football tournament

The Copa Eva Duarte was a Spanish football tournament organized by the Royal Spanish Football Federation (RFEF) and contested by the winners of La Liga and the Copa del Generalísimo.

== History ==
In September 1940, a match with this format had the name of Copa de Campeones. It was not repeated until December 1945 when, due to the good relations with the Spanish military government, the ambassador of Argentina offered a trophy called Copa de Oro Argentina. Both these trophies were unofficial and were only played once.

In 1941 the Copa Presidente FEF was established as an official tournament founded and organized by the RFEF; however, it was also only contested once, and though 11 of the 12 matches in its mini-league format were played between April and May 1941, its last, decisive fixture was delayed until eventually taking place in September 1947.

Also in 1947, the "Copa Eva Duarte de Perón" was established as an annual and official tournament founded and organized by the RFEF, as a tribute to Argentine president Juan Perón and his wife Eva Perón. It was played between September and December, usually as one-match finals. The trophy was the predecessor of the current Supercopa de España, first held in 1982.

== Champions by year ==
Year	Winners	Winners of	Runners-up	Winners of	Score
1947	Real Madrid	1947 Copa del Generalísimo	Valencia	1946–47 La Liga	3–1
1948	Barcelona	1947–48 La Liga	Sevilla	1947–48 Copa del Generalísimo	1–0
1949	Valencia	1948–49 Copa del Generalísimo	Barcelona	1948–49 La Liga	7–4 (a.e.t)
1950	Athletic Bilbao	1949–50 Copa del Generalísimo	Atlético Madrid	1949–50 La Liga	5–5 (a.e.t); 2–0 (Replay)
1951	Atlético Madrid	1950–51 La Liga	Barcelona	1951 Copa del Generalísimo	2–0
1952	Barcelona	1951–52 Liga and Copa	Awarded automatically for winning the Double.		
1953	Barcelona	1952–53 Liga and Copa	Awarded automatically for winning the Double.		

* The 1947 match was not actually played until June 1948.
** In 1952 and 1953 the cup was awarded to Barcelona, as they had won the La Liga / Copa del Generalísimo double.

== Titles by team ==
Team	Champion	Runner-up	Years won	Years lost
Barcelona	3	2	1948, 1952, 1953	1949, 1951
Valencia	1	1	1949	1947
Atlético Madrid	1	1	1951	1950
Real Madrid	1	–	1947	–
Athletic Bilbao	1	–	1950	–
Sevilla	–	1	–	1948

== Top goalscorers ==
No.	Nat.	Player	Pos.	Club	Total
1	(Spain)	Silvestre Igoa	FW	Valencia	3
1	(Spain)	Josep Seguer	DF	Barcelona	3
1	(Spain)	José Luis Pérez-Payá	FW	Atlético Madrid	3
1	(Spain)	Telmo Zarra	FW	Athletic Bilbao	3
2	(Spain)	Venancio Pérez	FW	Athletic Bilbao	2
3	16 players				1

== See also ==
- Supercopa de España
- Copa de los Campeones de España
- Copa de Oro Argentina
