= 1948–49 La Liga =

18th season of La Liga

Primera División
- Season: 1948–49
- Champions: Barcelona (4th title)
- Relegated: Alcoyano; Sabadell
- Latin Cup: Barcelona
- Matches: 182
- Goals: 739 (4.06 per match)
- Top goalscorer: César Rodríguez (27 goals)
- Biggest home win: Valencia 7–0 Gimnástico
- Biggest away win: Sevilla 1–5 Real Madrid
- Highest scoring: Celta 6–4 Gimnástico
- Longest winning run: 4 matches Barcelona; Valencia; Real Madrid; Atlético Madrid; Sevilla
- Longest unbeaten run: 10 matches Real Madrid
- Longest winless run: 8 matches Sabadell
- Longest losing run: 6 matches Gimnástico

The 1948–49 La Liga was the 18th season since its establishment. Barcelona won their fourth title, the second consecutive.

== Team locations ==
Location of teams in 1948–49 La Liga

Valladolid made their debut in La Liga. The first club from Castile and León to play in the Primera Division

Club	City	Stadium
Alcoyano	Alcoy	El Collao
Atlético Bilbao	Bilbao	San Mamés
Atlético Madrid	Madrid	Metropolitano
Barcelona	Barcelona	Les Corts
Celta	Vigo	Balaídos
Deportivo La Coruña	A Coruña	Riazor
Gimnástico	Tarragona	Avenida de Cataluña
Español	Barcelona	Sarriá
Oviedo	Oviedo	Buenavista
Real Madrid	Madrid	Chamartín
Sabadell	Sabadell	Cruz Alta
Sevilla	Seville	Nervión
Valencia	Valencia	Mestalla
Valladolid	Valladolid	Municipal

== League table ==
Pos	Team	Pld	W	D	L	GF	GA	GD	Pts	Qualification or relegation
1	Barcelona (C)	26	16	5	5	66	36	+30	37	Qualification for the Latin Cup
2	Valencia	26	16	3	7	78	47	+31	35	
3	Real Madrid	26	15	4	7	67	42	+25	34 (Note: Real Madrid finished ahead of Atlético Madrid on head-to-head goal difference: Atlético Madrid–Real Madrid 0–2, Real Madrid–Atlético Madrid 1–2.)	
4	Atlético Madrid	26	15	4	7	54	32	+22	34	
5	Oviedo	26	13	4	9	50	43	+7	30	
6	Atlético Bilbao	26	11	2	13	61	63	−2	24 (Note: Atlético Bilbao finished ahead of Español on head-to-head points: Atlético Bilbao–Español 4–3, Español–Atlético Bilbao 1–1.)	
7	Español	26	10	4	12	51	46	+5	24	
8	Sevilla	26	11	1	14	35	40	−5	23 (Note: Sevilla finished ahead of Gimástico on head-to-head points: Sevilla–Gimnástico 3–1, Gimnástico–Sevilla 1–3.)	
9	Gimnástico	26	10	3	13	59	72	−13	23	
10	Deportivo La Coruña	26	9	4	13	56	60	−4	22 (Note: Head-to-head points and goal difference: Deportivo 4 (+4), Celta 4 (0), Valladolid 4 (–4).)	
11	Celta	26	9	4	13	51	64	−13	22	
12	Valladolid	26	10	2	14	38	59	−21	22	
13	Alcoyano (R)	26	8	5	13	30	54	−24	21	Relegated to the Segunda División
14	Sabadell (R)	26	5	3	18	43	81	−38	13	Relegated to the Segunda División

Source: BDFútbol
Rules for classification: 1) points; 2) head-to-head points; 3) head-to-head goal difference; 4) goal difference; 5) number of goals scored.
(C) Champions; (R) Relegated

== Results ==
Home \ Away	ALC	ATB	ATM	BAR	CEL	DEP	ESP	GIM	OVI	RMA	SAB	SEV	VAL	VAD
Alcoyano	—	1–0	0–0	1–2	1–0	1–0	2–0	2–2	2–1	2–2	2–1	2–0	0–1	2–1
Atlético Bilbao	3–0	—	1–3	2–0	3–2	3–1	4–3	4–1	0–1	2–3	7–2	4–0	3–2	7–2
Atlético Madrid	4–0	3–2	—	2–0	3–0	4–0	2–1	1–0	6–0	0–2	6–0	1–1	2–2	2–0
Barcelona	4–0	5–2	4–0	—	3–1	5–1	2–1	3–1	5–2	3–1	4–1	2–1	4–3	6–0
Celta	5–1	3–4	2–2	2–2	—	1–1	2–1	6–4	2–1	3–1	3–2	3–1	4–2	2–0
Deportivo La Coruña	6–1	3–1	3–1	2–2	3–3	—	3–0	6–2	1–2	0–3	5–2	2–0	1–2	5–0
Español	1–1	1–1	4–1	1–1	5–0	4–1	—	5–4	0–0	3–2	6–2	1–0	3–0	5–1
Gimnástico	3–1	3–1	2–1	2–2	3–2	1–4	4–1	—	2–4	3–3	3–2	1–3	6–1	4–2
Oviedo	1–1	6–3	2–0	2–0	5–2	4–1	3–0	0–2	—	1–1	5–4	0–1	2–1	2–1
Real Madrid	3–1	4–2	1–2	1–2	6–0	3–1	3–1	3–1	0–2	—	5–1	1–0	4–3	4–1
Sabadell	3–1	2–2	1–3	1–0	3–0	4–4	2–0	2–3	2–2	1–2	—	1–3	0–3	3–1
Sevilla	2–0	6–0	0–1	1–2	2–1	3–1	0–3	3–1	1–0	1–5	4–1	—	0–2	2–1
Valencia	5–3	5–0	4–3	4–2	1–0	7–1	4–1	7–0	3–1	4–4	3–0	2–0	—	6–2
Valladolid	4–2	1–0	0–1	1–1	4–2	1–0	1–0	3–1	2–1	2–0	4–0	2–0	1–1	—

Source: BDFútbol
Legend: Blue = home team win; Yellow = draw; Red = away team win.

== Top scorers ==
Rank	Player	Team	Goals
1	(Spain) César Rodríguez	Barcelona	28
2	(Spain) Telmo Zarra	Atlético Bilbao	22
3	(Spain) Pahiño	Real Madrid	21
4	(Spain) Mundo	Valencia	19
5	(Spain) Adrián Escudero	Atlético Madrid	17
6	(Spain) Vicente Seguí	Valencia	16
7	(Spain) Ángel Cabido	Oviedo	15
7	(Spain) Pablo Olmedo	Real Madrid	15
9	(Spain) Rafael Franco	Deportivo La Coruña	14
9	(Spain) Manuel Marquínez	Deportivo La Coruña	14
9	(Spain) Gallardo	Gimnástico	14
