= 1952–53 La Liga =

22nd season of La Liga

Primera División
- Season: 1952–53
- Champions: Barcelona (6th title)
- Relegated: Málaga; Zaragoza
- Latin Cup: Valencia
- Matches: 240
- Goals: 935 (3.9 per match)
- Top goalscorer: Telmo Zarra (24 goals)
- Biggest home win: Barcelona 8–0 Zaragoza
- Biggest away win: Zaragoza 1–5 Barcelona; Zaragoza 0–4 Valladolid; Valladolid 0–4 Sevilla
- Highest scoring: Atlético Bilbao 8–2 Deportivo La Coruña
- Longest winning run: 7 matches Español
- Longest unbeaten run: 13 matches Valencia
- Longest winless run: 9 matches Atlético Madrid
- Longest losing run: 8 matches Zaragoza

The 1952–53 La Liga was the 22nd season since its establishment. Barcelona retained the title and achieved their sixth trophy.

== Team locations ==
Location of teams in 1952–53 La Liga

| Club | City | Stadium |
|---|---|---|
| Atlético Bilbao | Bilbao | San Mamés |
| Atlético Madrid | Madrid | Metropolitano |
| Barcelona | Barcelona | Les Corts |
| Celta | Vigo | Balaídos |
| Deportivo La Coruña | A Coruña | Riazor |
| Español | Barcelona | Sarriá |
| Málaga | Málaga | La Rosaleda |
| Oviedo | Oviedo | Buenavista |
| Real Gijón | Gijón | El Molinón |
| Real Madrid | Madrid | Chamartín |
| Real Santander | Santander | El Sardinero |
| Real Sociedad | San Sebastián | Atotxa |
| Sevilla | Seville | Nervión |
| Valencia | Valencia | Mestalla |
| Valladolid | Valladolid | José Zorrilla |
| Zaragoza | Zaragoza | Torrero |

== League table ==
| Pos | Team | Pld | W | D | L | GF | GA | GD | Pts | Qualification or relegation |
|---|---|---|---|---|---|---|---|---|---|---|
| 1 | Barcelona (C) | 30 | 19 | 4 | 7 | 82 | 43 | +39 | 42 | |
| 2 | Valencia | 30 | 16 | 8 | 6 | 66 | 42 | +24 | 40 | Qualification for the Latin Cup (Note: The winner of the 1952–53 La Liga, Barcelona, had to play the 1953 Copa del Generalísimo and had no dates available to play the Latin Cup.) |
| 3 | Real Madrid | 30 | 18 | 3 | 9 | 67 | 49 | +18 | 39 | |
| 4 | Español | 30 | 16 | 4 | 10 | 64 | 40 | +24 | 36 | |
| 5 | Sevilla | 30 | 16 | 2 | 12 | 70 | 57 | +13 | 34 | |
| 6 | Atlético Bilbao | 30 | 14 | 4 | 12 | 83 | 52 | +31 | 32 | |
| 7 | Real Gijón | 30 | 11 | 8 | 11 | 39 | 54 | −15 | 30 | |
| 8 | Atlético Madrid | 30 | 13 | 4 | 13 | 65 | 70 | −5 | 30 | |
| 9 | Oviedo | 30 | 12 | 5 | 13 | 63 | 62 | +1 | 29 | |
| 10 | Real Sociedad | 30 | 10 | 8 | 12 | 54 | 61 | −7 | 28 | |
| 11 | Real Santander | 30 | 11 | 5 | 14 | 46 | 61 | −15 | 27 | |
| 12 | Valladolid | 30 | 10 | 5 | 15 | 48 | 54 | −6 | 25 | |
| 13 | Celta Vigo (O) | 30 | 10 | 5 | 15 | 54 | 69 | −15 | 25 | Qualification for the relegation group |
| 14 | Deportivo La Coruña (O) | 30 | 9 | 6 | 15 | 49 | 78 | −29 | 24 | Qualification for the relegation group |
| 15 | Málaga (R) | 30 | 10 | 2 | 18 | 47 | 69 | −22 | 22 | Relegation to the Segunda División |
| 16 | Zaragoza (R) | 30 | 6 | 5 | 19 | 38 | 74 | −36 | 17 | Relegation to the Segunda División |

Source: BDFútbol
Rules for classification: 1) Points; 2) Head-to-head results; 3) Goal difference; 4) Number of goals scored
(C) Champions; (O) Play-off winners; (R) Relegated

== Results ==
| Home \ Away | ATB | ATM | BAR | CEL | DEP | ESP | MAL | OVI | RGI | RMA | RSA | RSO | SEV | VAL | VAD | ZAR |
|---|---|---|---|---|---|---|---|---|---|---|---|---|---|---|---|---|
| Atlético Bilbao | — | 5–0 | 4–3 | 5–0 | 8–2 | 1–0 | 6–1 | 3–3 | 6–1 | 2–2 | 5–2 | 6–1 | 6–1 | 1–1 | 4–2 | 3–0 |
| Atlético Madrid | 2–3 | — | 2–1 | 4–1 | 4–1 | 4–1 | 1–3 | 5–1 | 1–0 | 1–2 | 3–0 | 4–3 | 4–2 | 3–3 | 2–2 | 4–1 |
| Barcelona | 3–2 | 6–1 | — | 4–0 | 4–3 | 2–1 | 6–2 | 4–1 | 3–1 | 1–0 | 3–1 | 3–0 | 3–2 | 2–1 | 2–1 | 8–0 |
| Celta | 2–2 | 3–2 | 3–3 | — | 2–0 | 0–1 | 3–1 | 3–0 | 3–0 | 2–1 | 1–1 | 3–0 | 4–0 | 1–1 | 2–0 | 6–1 |
| Deportivo La Coruña | 3–2 | 5–1 | 1–1 | 3–2 | — | 2–2 | 1–0 | 2–2 | 5–0 | 0–2 | 0–1 | 1–0 | 2–0 | 1–2 | 1–4 | 0–0 |
| Español | 6–2 | 2–0 | 0–2 | 6–1 | 7–1 | — | 2–1 | 3–0 | 4–0 | 2–4 | 3–1 | 2–0 | 6–2 | 2–1 | 1–0 | 3–2 |
| Málaga | 1–0 | 1–3 | 2–1 | 2–1 | 1–2 | 1–1 | — | 4–2 | 2–3 | 6–0 | 4–2 | 2–4 | 0–3 | 3–3 | 3–0 | 1–0 |
| Oviedo | 2–1 | 5–0 | 2–1 | 4–0 | 3–3 | 1–0 | 6–1 | — | 2–4 | 3–1 | 1–3 | 2–2 | 2–0 | 2–3 | 6–3 | 3–2 |
| Real Gijón | 1–2 | 2–0 | 0–0 | 1–1 | 4–1 | 1–1 | 4–0 | 1–3 | — | 2–1 | 2–0 | 1–0 | 1–0 | 1–1 | 1–0 | 2–3 |
| Real Madrid | 3–2 | 2–0 | 2–1 | 5–1 | 5–2 | 1–2 | 2–0 | 3–2 | 2–2 | — | 2–1 | 5–0 | 3–2 | 3–0 | 3–1 | 2–1 |
| Real Santander | 2–0 | 3–3 | 3–3 | 2–0 | 3–1 | 2–1 | 2–0 | 0–2 | 0–1 | 2–3 | — | 1–1 | 4–1 | 1–2 | 2–2 | 3–1 |
| Real Sociedad | 3–1 | 0–2 | 0–2 | 7–3 | 6–1 | 2–1 | 4–1 | 3–2 | 0–0 | 3–0 | 3–1 | — | 1–1 | 0–0 | 2–2 | 1–1 |
| Sevilla | 1–0 | 3–1 | 4–2 | 4–2 | 6–2 | 2–1 | 2–0 | 2–1 | 7–1 | 2–2 | 1–2 | 4–1 | — | 4–2 | 3–0 | 5–2 |
| Valencia | 3–1 | 1–2 | 3–2 | 3–2 | 1–1 | 1–1 | 3–1 | 4–0 | 4–0 | 3–2 | 7–1 | 5–2 | 1–0 | — | 2–0 | 3–1 |
| Valladolid | 1–0 | 4–4 | 0–1 | 3–1 | 4–0 | 0–1 | 2–1 | 1–0 | 2–2 | 3–1 | 1–2 | 1–2 | 4–0 | 2–0 | — | 3–1 |
| Zaragoza | 2–0 | 4–2 | 1–5 | 3–1 | 1–2 | 3–1 | 0–2 | 0–0 | 0–0 | 0–3 | 4–0 | 3–3 | 1–2 | 0–2 | 0–4 | — |

Source: BDFútbol
Legend: Blue = home team win; Yellow = draw; Red = away team win.

== Relegation group ==
=== Standings ===
| Pos | Team | Pld | W | D | L | GF | GA | GD | Pts | Qualification |
|---|---|---|---|---|---|---|---|---|---|---|
| 1 | Deportivo La Coruña (O) | 10 | 5 | 1 | 4 | 15 | 11 | +4 | 11 | Qualification to La Liga |
| 2 | España Industrial (Note: España Industrial was ineligible for promotion, as they were the reserve team of Barcelona.) (O) | 10 | 4 | 3 | 3 | 20 | 12 | +8 | 11 | Qualification to Segunda División |
| 3 | Celta | 10 | 4 | 2 | 4 | 18 | 17 | +1 | 10 | Qualification to La Liga |
| 4 | Atlético Tetuán | 10 | 4 | 2 | 4 | 15 | 13 | +2 | 10 | Qualification to Segunda División |
| 5 | Avilés | 10 | 4 | 1 | 5 | 14 | 22 | −8 | 9 | Qualification to Segunda División |
| 6 | Hércules | 10 | 4 | 1 | 5 | 12 | 19 | −7 | 9 | Qualification to Segunda División |

Source: BDFútbol
Rules for classification: 1) Points; 2) Head-to-head results; 3) Goal difference; 4) Number of goals scored
(O) Play-off winners

=== Results ===
| Home \ Away | TET | AVI | CEL | DEP | ESP | HER |
|---|---|---|---|---|---|---|
| Atlético Tetuán | — | 6–1 | 0–0 | 2–0 | 2–1 | 3–0 |
| Avilés | 1–0 | — | 4–1 | 1–0 | 1–3 | 2–0 |
| Celta | 4–1 | 4–2 | — | 1–3 | 1–1 | 5–1 |
| Deportivo La Coruña | 3–0 | 1–0 | 1–2 | — | 0–0 | 3–1 |
| España Industrial | 1–1 | 6–1 | 3–0 | 1–3 | — | 4–1 |
| Hércules | 2–0 | 1–1 | 1–0 | 2–0 | 3–1 | — |

Source: BDFútbol
Legend: Blue = home team win; Yellow = draw; Red = away team win.

== Top scorers ==
| Rank | Player | Club | Goals |
|---|---|---|---|
| 1 | (Spain) Telmo Zarra | Atlético Bilbao | 24 |
| 2 | (Spain) Moreno | Barcelona | 22 |
| 3 | (Spain) Adrián Escudero | Atlético Madrid | 21 |
| 3 | (Spain) Julián Arcas | Español | 21 |
| 5 | (Spain) Silvestre Igoa | Real Sociedad | 20 |
| 6 | (Spain) Pahiño | Real Madrid | 19 |
| 6 | (Spain) Hermidita | Celta Vigo | 19 |
| 8 | (Spain) Juan Arza | Sevilla | 16 |
| 8 | (Spain) Manuel Badenes | Valencia | 16 |
| 8 | (Argentina) Pedro Sará | Oviedo | 16 |
