= 1952–53 Copa del Generalísimo =

51st Copa del Rey

Tournament details
- Country: Spain
- Teams: 44

Final positions
- Champions: FC Barcelona (12th title)
- Runners-up: Atlético de Bilbao

Tournament statistics
- Matches played: 84
- Goals scored: 321 (3.82 per match)

The 1952–53 Copa del Generalísimo was the 51st staging of the Spanish Cup. The competition began on 1 October 1952 and concluded on 21 June 1953 with the final.

== First round ==
Team 1	Agg.	Team 2	1st leg	2nd leg
Caudal Deportivo	1–2	Real Avilés CF	1–1	0–1
Club Ferrol	3–1	UD Salamanca	2–0	1–1
Baracaldo CF	8–3	Gimnástica de Torrelavega	5–3	3–0
CA Osasuna	5–9	CD Alavés	5–4	0–5
UD Lérida	3–2	Gimnástico de Tarragona	3–1	0–1
SD España Industrial	8–3	CD San Andrés	3–0	5–3
Burgos CF	4–2	AD Plus Ultra	2–1	2–1
RCD Mallorca	3–2	CD Sabadell	3–1	0–1
Hércules CF	4–1	Orihuela Deportiva CF	3–1	1–0
Real Jaén CF	4–3	CD Mestalla	3–0	1–3
Real Murcia CF	8–5	CP Cacereño	3–2	5–3
RCD Córdoba	4–5	UD Las Palmas	3–2	1–3
Atlético Tetuán	4–6	UD Melilla	2–4	2–2
RB Linense	3–2	Atlético Baleares	3–0	0–2
Granada CF	7–2	CD Alcoyano	4–0	3–2

Source: RSSSF

== Second round ==
Team 1	Agg.	Team 2	1st leg	2nd leg
Club Ferrol	4–6	Real Avilés CF	3–1	1–5
CD Alavés	2–2	Burgos CF	1–0	1–2
Baracaldo CF	4–3	CD Logroñés	3–2	1–1
UD Lérida	0–2	CD España Industrial	0–0	0–2
UD Las Palmas	5–2	RCD Mallorca	4–1	1–1
Real Murcia CF	2–1	Hércules CF	2–0	0–1
UD Melilla	2–6	Real Jaén CF	2–1	0–5
Granada CF	7–3	Real Balompédica Linense	4–1	3–2

- Tiebreaker 1

Team 1	Score	Team 2
CD Alavés	2–2	Burgos CF

- Tiebreaker 2

Team 1	Score	Team 2
Burgos CF	2–2	CD Alavés

- Tiebreaker 3

Team 1	Score	Team 2
CD Alavés	3–0	Burgos CF

== Third round ==
Team 1	Agg.	Team 2	1st leg	2nd leg
CD Alavés	5–1	Real Avilés CF	5–1	1–1 (Note: It was not played by coincidence with the Second Division playoff of Real Avilés.)
Baracaldo CF	6–0	CD España Industrial	6–0	0–2 (Note: It was not played by coincidence with the Second Division playoff of CD España Industrial.)
Real Jaén CF	3–7	Granada CF	1–3	2–4
Real Murcia CF	1–0	UD Las Palmas	1–0	0–0

Source: RSSSF

== Round of 16 ==
Team 1	Agg.	Team 2	1st leg	2nd leg
Real Sociedad de Fútbol	4–3	Real Valladolid Deportivo	3–1	1–2
CD Alavés	2–9	Club Atlético de Bilbao	2–4	0–5
Baracaldo CF	6–4	Real Oviedo CF	4–2	2–2
Real Gijón	2–4	RCD Español	1–0	1–4
CF Barcelona	6–1	Valencia CF	5–0	1–1
Granada CF	2–7	Real Santander SD	1–1	1–6
Real Madrid CF	7–1	Real Murcia CF	4–0	3–1
Sevilla CF	3–5	Club Atlético de Madrid	1–1	2–4

Source: RSSSF

== Quarter-finals ==
Team 1	Agg.	Team 2	1st leg	2nd leg
Baracaldo CF	2–7	Club Atlético de Bilbao	1–1	1–6
Real Santander SD	1–3	CF Barcelona	1–0	0–3
Real Madrid CF	5–3	Real Sociedad de Fútbol	4–0	1–3
RCD Español	5–6	Atlético de Madrid	3–1	2–5

Source: RSSSF

== Semi-finals ==
Team 1	Agg.	Team 2	1st leg	2nd leg
CF Barcelona	9–3	Club Atlético de Madrid	8–1	1–2
Real Madrid CF	3–4	Club Atlético de Bilbao	2–2	1–2

Source: RSSSF

== Final ==
Team 1	Score	Team 2
CF Barcelona	2–1	Club Atlético de Bilbao

21 June 1953
18:00 CET

CF Barcelona	2–1	Atlético de Bilbao
Kubala 46'; Manchón 57'	Report (in Spanish)	Venancio 61'

Estadio Chamartín, Madrid
Attendance: 67,145
Referee: Rafael García Fernández

Copa del Generalísimo
winners
FC Barcelona
12th title
