= 1952 Copa del Generalísimo =

50th Copa del Rey

Tournament details
- Country: Spain
- Teams: 14

Final positions
- Champions: FC Barcelona (11th title)
- Runners-up: Valencia CF

Tournament statistics
- Matches played: 28
- Goals scored: 116 (4.14 per match)

The 1952 Copa del Generalísimo was the 50th staging of the Copa del Rey, the Spanish football cup competition.

The competition began on 17 April 1952 and concluded on 25 May 1952 with the final.

== First round ==
Team 1	Agg.	Team 2	1st leg	2nd leg
Real Valladolid Deportivo	9–5	RC Deportivo de La Coruña	6–2	3–3
RC Celta de Vigo	2–5	Real Madrid CF	2–3	0–2
Club Atlético de Bilbao	3–4	Real Zaragoza CD	3–0	0–4
RCD Español	1–1	Real Sociedad de Fútbol	0–0	1–1
Club Atlético de Madrid	3–9	CF Barcelona	2–4	1–5
Sevilla CF	3–3	Valencia CF	3–1	0–2

- Tiebreaker

Team 1	Score	Team 2
RCD Español	2–4	Real Sociedad de Fútbol
Sevilla CF	1–3	Valencia CF

- Bye: Real Oviedo CF and CD Málaga.

== Quarter-finals ==
Team 1	Agg.	Team 2	1st leg	2nd leg
Real Madrid CF	7–3	Real Oviedo CF	6–3	1–0
Real Sociedad de Fútbol	1–1	Real Valladolid Deportivo	0–0	1–1
Real Zaragoza CD	3–6	Valencia CF	1–3	2–3
CD Málaga	1–13	CF Barcelona	0–7	1–6

- Tiebreaker

Team 1	Score	Team 2
Real Sociedad de Fútbol	1–2	Real Valladolid Deportivo

== Semi-finals ==
Team 1	Agg.	Team 2	1st leg	2nd leg
Valencia CF	3–2	Real Madrid CF	2–1	1–1
CF Barcelona	6–3	Real Valladolid Deportivo	5–0	1–3

== Final ==
Team 1	Score	Team 2
CF Barcelona	4–2 (aet)	Valencia CF

Copa del Generalísimo
winners
CF Barcelona
11th title
