= La Liga records and statistics =

La Liga records

La Liga is a Spanish professional league for association football clubs. At the top of the Spanish football league system, it is the country's primary football competition and is contested by 20 clubs. The competition was formed in 1929, with an initial format of 10 teams.

== Clubs ==
Records in this section refer to La Liga from its founding in 1929 through to the present.

=== Titles ===
- Most league titles: 36, Real Madrid (1931–32, 1932–33, 1953–54, 1954–55, 1956–57, 1957–58, 1960–61, 1961–62, 1962–63, 1963–64, 1964–65, 1966–67, 1967–68, 1968–69, 1971–72, 1974–75, 1975–76, 1977–78, 1978–79, 1979–80, 1985–86, 1986–87, 1987–88, 1988–89, 1989–90, 1994–95, 1996–97, 2000–01, 2002–03, 2006–07, 2007–08, 2011–12, 2016–17, 2019–20, 2021–22, 2023–24)
- Most consecutive league titles: 5, Real Madrid (twice): (1961 to 1965 and 1986 to 1990)

=== Top-flight appearances ===
- Most appearances: 96, joint record (up to 2026–27)
  - Athletic Bilbao (1929–present)
  - Barcelona (1929–present)
  - Real Madrid (1929–present)

=== Wins ===
- Most wins overall: 1,873 – Real Madrid
- Most wins in a season: 32, Real Madrid (2011–12) and Barcelona (2012–13)
- Most home wins in a season: 19
  - Barcelona (1986–87, out of 22)
  - Barcelona (2025–26, out of 19)
- Most away wins in a season: 16, Real Madrid (2011–12)
- Fewest wins in a season: 2, joint record:
  - Sporting Gijón (1997–98): final record P38 W2 D7 L29
  - Logroñés (1994–95): final record P38 W2 D9 L27
  - Celta Vigo (1943–44): final record P26 W2 D5 L19
  - Real Betis (1942–43): final record P26 W2 D6 L18
- 100% home win record in a season:
  - Athletic Bilbao (9 games, 1933–34)
  - Athletic Bilbao (11 games, 1935–36)
  - Barcelona (13 games, 1948–49)
  - Barcelona (15 games, 1952–53)
  - Sevilla (15 games, 1956–57)
  - Barcelona (15 games, 1958–59)
  - Barcelona (15 games, 1959–60)
  - Real Madrid (15 games, 1959–60)
  - Real Madrid (15 games, 1962–63)
  - Real Madrid (17 games, 1985–86)
  - Barcelona (19 games, 2025–26)

=== Draws ===
- Most draws overall: 737 – Athletic Bilbao
- Most draws in a season: 18, Deportivo La Coruña (2015–16)

=== Losses ===
- Most losses overall: 1,186 – Espanyol
- Most losses in a season: 30 – Real Valladolid (2024–25)
- Fewest losses in a season: 0 (18 games season), joint record:
  - Athletic Bilbao (1929–30; final record P18 W12 D6 L0)
  - Real Madrid (1931–32; final record P18 W10 D8 L0)
- Fewest losses in a season under current league format (38 games): 1, joint record:
  - Real Madrid (1988–89; final record P38 W25 D12 L1)
  - Barcelona (2009–10; final record P38 W31 D6 L1)
  - Barcelona (2017–18; final record P38 W28 D9 L1)
  - Real Madrid (2023–24; final record P38 W29 D8 L1)
- Fewest home losses in a season: 0, joint record:
  - Almería (1979–80)
  - Athletic Bilbao (1929–30, 1931–32, 1933–34, 1935–36, 1952–53, 1955–56, 1975–76, 1977–78)
  - Atlético Madrid (1939–40, 1940–41, 1945–46, 1947–48, 1950–51, 1960–61, 1961–62, 1962–63, 1970–71, 1974–75, 1975–76, 1982–83, 2013–14)
  - Barcelona (1947–48, 1948–49, 1950–51, 1952–53, 1956–57, 1958–59, 1959–60, 1961–62, 1967–68, 1973–74, 1974–75, 1975–76, 1984–85, 1992–93, 2006–07, 2009–10, 2012–13, 2017–18, 2025–26)
  - Celta Vigo (1947–48, 1954–55, 1970–71)
  - Córdoba (1964–65)
  - Deportivo La Coruña (1949–50, 1954–55)
  - Espanyol (1948–49, 1963–64)
  - Granada (1971–72)
  - Hércules (1954–55)
  - Las Palmas (1954–55, 1967–68)
  - Osasuna (1957–58)
  - Oviedo (1933–34, 1944–45, 1990–91)
  - Pontevedra (1967–68)
  - Racing Santander (1931–32, 1933–34)
  - Real Betis (1934–35, 1983–84)
  - Real Madrid (1931–32, 1944–45, 1945–46, 1949–50, 1951–52, 1957–58, 1958–59, 1959–60, 1960–61, 1961–62, 1962–63, 1963–64, 1966–67, 1968–69, 1971–72, 1974–75, 1977–78, 1978–79, 1979–80, 1981–82, 1985–86, 1988–89, 1989–90, 1991–92, 1992–93, 1996–97, 2001–02, 2012–13, 2019–20, 2023–24)
  - Real Sociedad (1929, 1950–51, 1974–75, 1976–77, 1979–80, 1981–82, 2002–03)
  - Sevilla (1940–41, 1950–51, 1951–52, 1956–57, 1980–81)
  - Valencia (1931–32, 1940–41, 1948–49, 1957–58, 1961–62, 1979–80)
  - Zaragoza (1961–62, 1964–65, 1967–68, 1974–75)

=== Points ===
==== Most points in a La Liga season (at least 90 points) ====
Rank	Club	Season	Points	Matches
1	Real Madrid	2011–12	100	38
1	Barcelona	2012–13	100	38
3	Barcelona	2009–10	99	38
4	Real Madrid	2009–10	96	38
4	Barcelona	2010–11	96	38
6	Real Madrid	2023–24	95	38
7	Barcelona	2014–15	94	38
7	Barcelona	2025–26	94	38
9	Real Madrid	2016–17	93	38
9	Barcelona	2017–18	93	38
11	Real Madrid	1996–97	92	42
11	Real Madrid	2010–11	92	38
11	Real Madrid	2014–15	92	38
14	Barcelona	2011–12	91	38
14	Barcelona	2015–16	91	38
16	Barcelona	1996–97	90	42
16	Atlético Madrid	2013–14	90	38
16	Real Madrid	2015–16	90	38
16	Barcelona	2016–17	90	38

==== Others ====
- Most points overall in the top flight: 4,959 – Real Madrid
- Most points in a season overall: 100 (87.72% of points), Real Madrid (2011–12), Barcelona (2012–13)
- Most points in a season at home: 57, Barcelona (2025–26)
- Most points in a season away: 50, Real Madrid (2011–12)
- Most points in a season opening half: 55, Barcelona (2012–13)
- Most points in a season closing half: 52, Real Madrid (2009–10)
- Most points in a season (2 points for a win, 18 games): 30, Athletic Bilbao (1929–30)
- Most points in a season (2 points for a win, 22 games): 34, Real Betis (1934–35)
- Most points in a season (2 points for a win, 26 games): 40, Valencia (1941–42 and 1943–44)
- Most points in a season (2 points for a win, 30 games): 52, Real Madrid (1960–61)
- Most points in a season (2 points for a win, 34 games): 56, Real Madrid (1985–86)
- Most points in a season (2 points for a win, 38 games): 62, Real Madrid (1987–88, 1988–89 and 1989–90)
- Most points in a season (2 points for a win, 44 games): 66, Real Madrid (1986–87)
- Most points in a season (3 points for a win, 42 games): 92, Real Madrid (1996–97)
- Most points in a season (3 points for a win, 38 games): 100, Real Madrid (2011–12), Barcelona (2012–13)
- Fewest points in a season (2 points for a win): 9, Celta Vigo (1943–44) final record P26 W2 D5 L19
- Fewest points in a season (3 points for a win): 13, Sporting Gijón (1997–98) final record P38 W2 D7 L29
- Fewest points in a season opening half: 3, Sporting Gijón (1997–98)
- Fewest points in a season closing half: 1, Real Valladolid (2024–25)

=== Streaks ===
==== Wins ====
- Most consecutive wins: 16, Barcelona (2010–11) and Real Madrid (2016–17)
- Most consecutive home wins: 39, Barcelona (16 February 1958 to 6 November 1960)
- Most consecutive away wins: 13, Real Madrid (26 February 2017 to 14 October 2017)
- Longest win streak from the start of a season: 9, Real Madrid (1968–69) and Barcelona (2026-27)

==== Draws ====
- Most consecutive draws: 9, Burgos (30 April 1978 to 28 October 1978)

==== Losses ====
- Most consecutive losses: 12, Real Valladolid (8 March 2025 to 24 May 2025, ongoing)
- Most consecutive losses at home: 9, Córdoba (24 January 2015 to 17 May 2015, ongoing)
- Most consecutive losses away: 25, Hércules (11 September 1955 to 26 February 1967)

==== Games without a loss ====
- Most consecutive league games without a loss: 43, Barcelona (8 April 2017 to 13 May 2018)
- Most consecutive home league games without a loss: 121, Real Madrid (17 February 1957 to 7 March 1965)
- Most consecutive away league games without a loss: 23, Barcelona (14 February 2010 to 30 April 2011)

==== Games without a win ====
- Most consecutive league games without a win: 31, Almería (23 May 2023 to 11 March 2024)
- Most consecutive league games without a win home: 19, Almería (28 May 2023 to 16 May 2024)
- Most consecutive league games without a win away: 72, Hércules (8 December 1940 to 12 March 1967)

==== Games without scoring ====
- Most consecutive league games without scoring: 8, joint record:
  - Sabadell (27 September 1987 to 6 December 1987)
  - Castellón (28 October 1990 to 6 January 1991)
  - Espanyol (5 July 2020 to 12 September 2021)
- Most consecutive league games without scoring at home: 7, Athletic Bilbao (6 January 1996 to 7 April 1996)
- Most consecutive league games without scoring away: 12, Deportivo La Coruña (17 January 1965 to 4 December 1966)
- Most consecutive league games without scoring away in a single season: 11, Hércules (17 November 2010 to 3 April 2011)

==== Games without conceding a goal ====
- Most consecutive league games without conceding a goal: 13, Atlético Madrid (2 December 1990 to 17 March 1991)
- Most consecutive league games without conceding a goal home: 12, Barcelona (23 April 2011 to 15 January 2012)
- Most consecutive league games without conceding a goal away: 7, Barcelona (1 November 1986 to 7 February 1987)
- Most games without conceding a goal in a season: 26, Deportivo La Coruña (1993–94), Barcelona (2022–23)
- Most consecutive clean sheets from the start of a season: 8, Barcelona (2014–15)

=== Goals ===
==== Most goals in a La Liga season (at least 100 goals) ====
Rank	Club	Season	Goals	Matches
1	Real Madrid	2011–12	121	38
2	Real Madrid	2014–15	118	38
3	Barcelona	2016–17	116	38
4	Barcelona	2012–13	115	38
5	Barcelona	2011–12	114	38
6	Barcelona	2015–16	112	38
7	Barcelona	2014–15	110	38
7	Real Madrid	2015–16	110	38
9	Real Madrid	1989–90	107	38
10	Real Madrid	2016–17	106	38
11	Barcelona	2008–09	105	38
12	Real Madrid	2013–14	104	38
13	Real Madrid	2012–13	103	38
14	Real Madrid	2009–10	102	38
14	Real Madrid	2010–11	102	38
14	Barcelona	2024–25	102	38
14	Barcelona	1996–97	102	42
18	Barcelona	2013–14	100	38

- Most goals in a season not including Real Madrid or Barcelona: 88 in 30 matches by Athletic Bilbao (1950–51).

==== Most goals in a season – all competitions (at least 150 goals) ====
Rank	Club	Season	Liga		Copa		Europe		Other		Total		
Rank	Club	Season	Goals	Matches	Goals	Matches	Goals	Matches	Goals	Matches	Goals	Matches	Goals/game
1	Barcelona	2011–12	114	38	26	9	35	12	15	5	190	64	2.97
2	Barcelona	2014–15	110	38	34	9	31	13	0	0	175	60	2.92
3	Real Madrid	2011–12	121	38	14	6	35	12	4	2	174	58	3
3	Barcelona	2024–25	102	38	22	6	43	14	7	2	174	60	2.9
5	Real Madrid	2016–17	106	38	22	6	36	13	9	3	173	60	2.88
5	Barcelona	2015–16	112	38	27	9	22	10	12	5	173	62	2.79
7	Barcelona	2016–17	116	38	24	9	26	10	5	2	171	59	2.9
8	Real Madrid	2014–15	118	38	11	4	24	12	9	5	162	59	2.75
9	Real Madrid	2013–14	104	38	15	9	41	13	0	0	160	60	2.67
10	Real Madrid	1959–60	92	30	35	9	31	7	0	0	158	46	3.43
10	Barcelona	2008–09	105	38	17	9	36	15	0	0	158	62	2.55
10	Barcelona	2012–13	115	38	21	8	18	12	4	2	158	60	2.63
13	Real Madrid	2012–13	103	38	20	9	26	12	4	2	153	61	2.51
14	Barcelona	2010–11	95	38	22	9	30	13	5	2	152	62	2.47

- First team to score at least 100 goals in a season: Valencia in 1941–42 (111 in 34 matches).
- A number of teams managed to score over 100 goals in a season during the 1930s, when the national league and cup were played alongside the regional leagues. Most prolific among those was the Athletic Bilbao team of the early 1930s, who scored 126 goals in 1929–30, 137 goals in 1930–31, 127 goals in 1931–32, 127 goals in 1932–33 and 115 goals in 1933–34; others include Oviedo, who scored 114 goals in 1933–34 and 110 goals in 1935–36.
- Most goals in a season (all competitions) besides Real Madrid and Barcelona: Sevilla in 2014–15 (119 in 60 matches).

==== Most effective team in a La Liga season (at least 3 goals per match) ====
Rank	Club	Season	Goals	Matches	Goals/match
1	Athletic Bilbao	1930–31	73	18	4.06
2	Athletic Bilbao	1929–30	63	18	3.50
2	Athletic Bilbao	1931–32	63	18	3.50
4	Athletic Bilbao	1933–34	61	18	3.39
5	Valencia	1941–42	85	26	3.27
6	Barcelona	1958–59	96	30	3.20
7	Real Madrid	2011–12	121	38	3.18
8	Atlético Aviación	1940–41	70	22	3.18
8	Sevilla	1940–41	70	22	3.18
10	Real Madrid	2014–15	118	38	3.10
11	Barcelona	1951–52	92	30	3.07
11	Real Madrid	1959–60	92	30	3.07
13	Barcelona	2016–17	116	38	3.05
14	Barcelona	2012–13	115	38	3.02
15	Barcelona	2011–12	114	38	3.00
15	Valencia	1948–49	78	26	3.00

==== Others ====
- Most league goals scored in a season: 121, Real Madrid (2011–12)
- Most home league goals scored in a season: 78, Real Madrid (1989–90)
- Most away league goals scored in a season: 58, Real Madrid (2016–17)
- Most games scored in a season: 38 (scoring in every game in a single La Liga season), Barcelona (2012–13), Real Madrid (2016–17)
- Fewest league goals scored in a season: 15, CD Logroñés (1994–95)
- Fewest home league goals scored in a season: 8, Granada (1969–70)
- Fewest away league goals scored in a season: 2, Deportivo La Coruña (1964–65)
- Most league goals conceded in a season: 134, Lleida (1950–51)
- Fewest league goals conceded in a season: 15 (18 game season), Real Madrid (1931–32)
- Fewest league goals conceded in a season at the current format (38 game season): 18, joint record Deportivo La Coruña (1993–94) & Atlético Madrid (2015–16)
- Fewest league goals conceded home in a season: 2, joint record:
  - Córdoba (1964–65)
  - Pontevedra (1968–69)
- Fewest league goals conceded away in a season: 9, joint record:
  - Real Madrid (1932–33)
  - Real Madrid (1968–69)
- Best conceded goal quota in a season:
  - 0.474 goals per game, Deportivo La Coruña (1993–94), Atlético Madrid (2015–2016) (Real Madrid's record of 15 goals was in an 18-game season and equals 0.833 goals/game; Deportivo and Atlético Madrid's tallies of 18 are from 38-game seasons)
- Best goal difference in a season: +89, Real Madrid (2011–12), Barcelona (2014–15)
- Worst goal difference in a season: –93, Lleida (1950–51)
- Most consecutive games scoring: 64, Barcelona (4 February 2012 to 5 October 2013)
- Most consecutive games scoring at home: 88, Barcelona (10 February 1952 to 19 January 1958)
- Most consecutive games scoring away: 35, Real Madrid (3 January 2016 to 29 October 2017)
- Most goals on one day: 59 goals in 8 games (17 September 1950)
- Fewest goals on one day: 8 goals in 8 games (18 March 1973)
- Most goalscorers in a season: 22, Barcelona (2021–22)
- Most league goals scored in a season opening half: 67, Real Madrid (2011–12)
- Most league goals scored in a season closing half: 67, Barcelona (2015–16)

=== Scorelines ===
- Record win: Athletic Bilbao 12–1 Barcelona (8 February 1931)
- Record away win: 0–8, on four occasions:
  - Las Palmas 0–8 Barcelona (25 October 1959)
  - Almería 0–8 Barcelona (20 November 2010)
  - Córdoba 0–8 Barcelona (2 May 2015)
  - Deportivo La Coruña 0–8 Barcelona (20 April 2016)
- Most goals in a game: 14, Athletic Bilbao 9–5 Racing Santander (5 February 1933)
- Highest scoring draw: 12, Atlético Madrid 6–6 Athletic Bilbao (29 January 1950)

=== Disciplinary ===
- Most red cards in a single match: 6,
  - Espanyol (3) v. Barcelona (3) (13 December 2003) (2 direct red cards and 4 double yellow cards)
- Most cards in a single match: 18,
  - Athletic Bilbao (6) v. Racing de Santander (12) (26 April 2009) (1 direct red card, 4 double yellow cards and 9 yellow cards)

== Players ==
=== Appearances ===
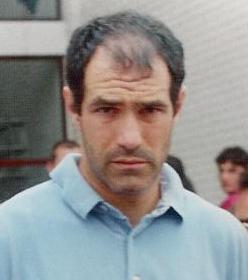
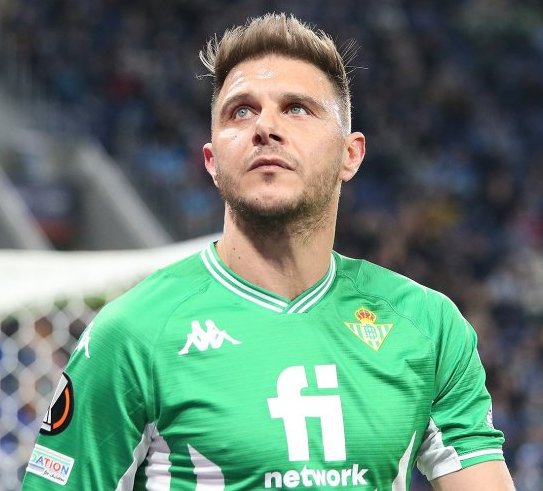
Andoni Zubizarreta (left) and Joaquín (right) hold the record for most appearances in La Liga history with 622 games.

==== Most appearances ====
As of matches played as of 31 August 2026

Players in bold are still active in La Liga. Players in italics are still active outside La Liga.

Rank	Nat.	Player	Years active	Apps	Goals
1	(Spain)	Andoni Zubizarreta	1981–1998	622	0
1	(Spain)	Joaquín	2001–2013; 2015–2023	622	77
3	(Spain)	Raúl García	2004–2024	609	112
4	(France)	Antoine Griezmann	2010–2026	564	205
5	(Spain)	Dani Parejo	2008–2026	558	78
6	(Spain)	Raúl	1994–2010	550	228
7	(Spain)	Eusebio Sacristán	1983–2002	543	36
8	(Spain)	Francisco Buyo	1980–1997	542	0
9	(Spain)	Sergio Ramos	2004–2021; 2023–2024	536	77
10	(Spain)	Manolo Sanchís	1983–2001	523	33
11	(Spain)	**Koke**	2009–	522	40
12	(Argentina)	Lionel Messi	2004–2021	520	474
13	(Spain)	Jesús Navas	2003–2013; 2017–2024	516	26
14	(Spain)	Iker Casillas	1999–2015	510	0
15	(Spain)	Xavi	1998–2015	505	58
16	(Spain)	Miquel Soler	1983–2003	504	12
17	(Spain)	Fernando Hierro	1987–2003	497	104
18	(Spain)	José Mari Bakero	1980–1997	483	139
19	(Spain)	Loren	1984–2002	482	54
20	(Spain)	Sergio Busquets	2008–2023	481	11
21	(Spain)	Joaquín Alonso	1976–1992	479	65
22	(Spain)	José Ramón Esnaola	1967–1985	469	0
23	(Spain)	José Ángel Iribar	1962–1980	466	0
23	(Spain)	Donato	1988–2003	466	49
25	(Spain)	Miguel Ángel Nadal	1989–2005	463	30
26	(Spain)	Santillana	1970–1988	461	186
26	(Spain)	Alberto Górriz	1979–1993	461	14
28	(Spain)	Juan Antonio Larrañaga	1980–1994	460	15
29	(Spain)	Manuel Jiménez	1979–1992	458	8
30	(Spain)	Jesús María Zamora	1974–1989	455	63

==== Others ====
- Most career league appearances: **622**, Andoni Zubizarreta and Joaquín
- Most career league appearances at one club: **550**, Raúl (for Real Madrid)
- Most career league appearances by a foreign player: **529**, Antoine Griezmann
- Most consecutive league appearances: **251**, Iñaki Williams (20 April 2016 to 29 January 2023)
- Oldest player: Joaquín, **41 years, 318 days** (for Real Betis v Valencia, 4 June 2023)
- Oldest player under exceptional circumstances: Harry Lowe, **48 years, 226 days** (for Real Sociedad v Valencia, 24 March 1935) (Real Sociedad's manager played due to a player down to illness, the team did not bring any substitutes to the away game for financial reasons.)
- Youngest player: Luka Romero, **15 years, 219 days** (for Mallorca v Real Madrid, 24 June 2020)
- Most appearances with different teams: **8**
  - Sandro Ramírez (Barcelona, Málaga, Sevilla, Real Sociedad, Real Valladolid, Huesca, Getafe, Las Palmas)
  - Carlos Aranda (Villarreal, Albacete, Sevilla, Numancia, Osasuna, Levante, Real Zaragoza, Granada)

=== Goalscorers ===
==== Top goalscorers ====
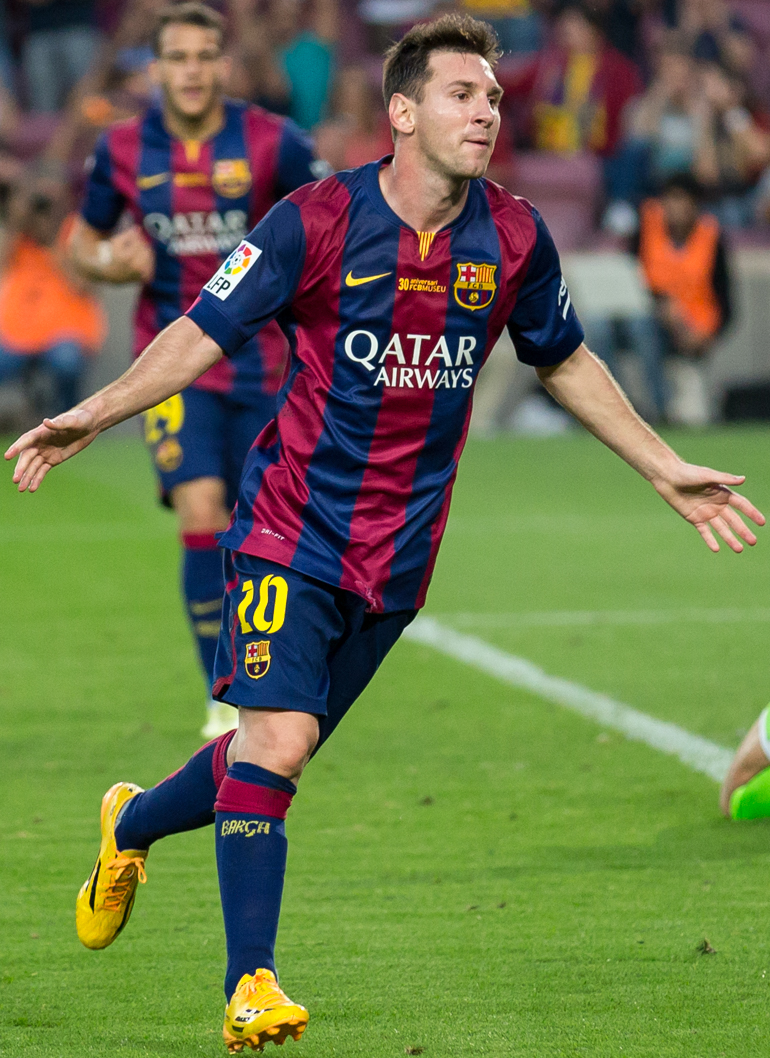
Argentine Lionel Messi is the all-time top goalscorer and also the all-time top assist maker in La Liga history.

As of matches played 31 August 2026

Players in bold are still active in La Liga. Players in italics are still active outside La Liga.

Rank	Nat.	Player	Years active	Goals	Apps	Ratio
1	(Argentina)	Lionel Messi	2004–2021	474	520	0.91
2	(Portugal)	Cristiano Ronaldo	2009–2018	311	292	1.07
3	(Spain)	Telmo Zarra	1940–1955	251	278	0.9
4	(France)	Karim Benzema	2009–2023	238	439	0.54
5	(Mexico)	Hugo Sánchez	1981–1994	234	347	0.67
6	(Spain)	Raúl	1994–2010	228	550	0.41
7	(Argentina)	Alfredo Di Stéfano	1953–1966	227	329	0.69
8	(Spain)	César Rodríguez	1939–1955	223	353	0.63
9	(Spain)	Quini	1970–1987	219	448	0.49
10	(Spain)	Pahiño	1943–1956	210	278	0.76
11	(France)	Antoine Griezmann	2010–2026	205	564	0.36
12	(Spain)	Edmundo Suárez	1939–1950	195	231	0.84
13	(Spain)	Santillana	1970–1988	186	461	0.4
14	(Spain)	David Villa	2003–2014	185	352	0.53
15	(Spain)	Juan Arza	1943–1959	182	349	0.52
16	(Uruguay)	Luis Suárez	2014–2022	179	258	0.69
17	(Spain)	Guillermo Gorostiza	1929–1945	178	256	0.7
18	(Spain)	**Iago Aspas**	2006–	171	422	0.41
19	(Cameroon)	Samuel Eto'o	1998–2009	162	280	0.58
20	(Spain)	Luis Aragonés	1960–1974	160	360	0.44
21	(Spain)	Aritz Aduriz	2002–2020	158	443	0.36
22	(Hungary)	Ferenc Puskás	1958–1966	156	180	0.87
23	(Spain)	Julio Salinas	1982–2000	152	417	0.36
24	(Spain)	Adrián Escudero	1945–1958	150	287	0.52
25	(Spain)	Daniel Ruiz	1974–1986	147	303	0.49
26	(Spain)	Raúl Tamudo	1997–2013	146	407	0.36
27	(Spain)	Silvestre Igoa	1941–1956	141	284	0.5
28	(Spain)	Manuel Badenes	1946–1959	139	201	0.69
28	(Spain)	Juan Araújo	1945–1956	139	207	0.67
28	(Spain)	José Mari Bakero	1980–1997	139	483	0.29

==== Most goals in a La Liga season (at least 35 goals) ====
As of matches played 20 May 2019

Bold player name denotes current season.

Rank	Nat.	Player	Season	Club	Goals	Apps	Ratio
1	(Argentina)	Lionel Messi	2011–12	Barcelona	50	37	1.351
2	(Portugal)	Cristiano Ronaldo	2014–15	Real Madrid	48	35	1.371
3	(Argentina)	Lionel Messi	2012–13	Barcelona	46	32	1.438
3	(Portugal)	Cristiano Ronaldo	2011–12	Real Madrid	46	38	1.211
5	(Argentina)	Lionel Messi	2014–15	Barcelona	43	38	1.132
6	(Portugal)	Cristiano Ronaldo	2010–11	Real Madrid	40	34	1.176
6	(Uruguay)	Luis Suárez	2015–16	Barcelona	40	35	1.143
8	(Spain)	Telmo Zarra	1950–51	Athletic Bilbao	38	30	1.267
8	(Mexico)	Hugo Sánchez	1989–90	Real Madrid	38	35	1.086
10	(Argentina)	Lionel Messi	2016–17	Barcelona	37	34	1.088
11	(Argentina)	Lionel Messi	2018–19	Barcelona	36	34	1.059
12	(Brazil)	Baltazar	1988–89	Atlético Madrid	35	36	0.972
12	(Portugal)	Cristiano Ronaldo	2015–16	Real Madrid	35	36	0.972

==== Most hat-tricks in the League (at least 10) ====
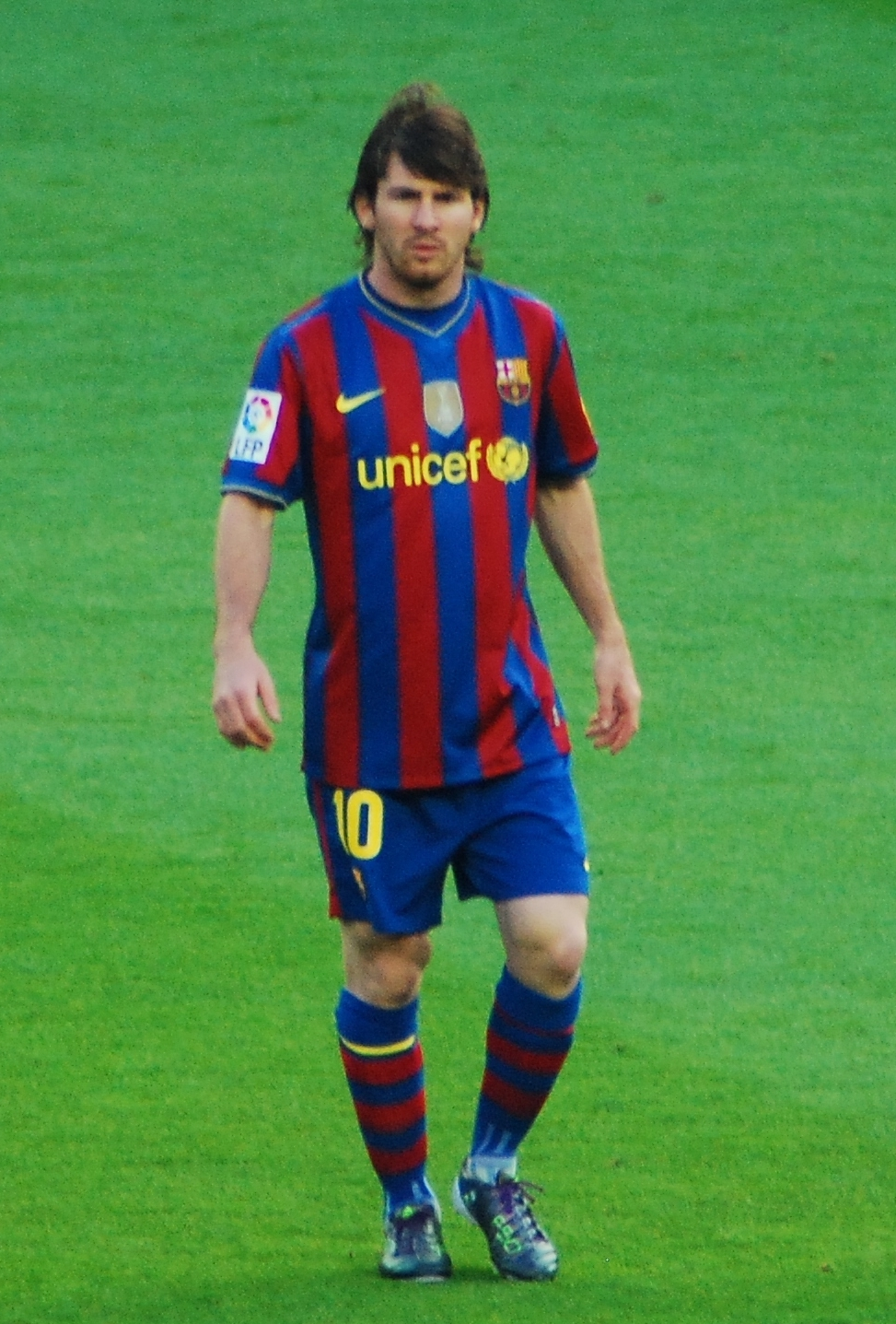
Lionel Messi scored a record 36 hat-tricks in La Liga.

Three or more goals in a single match. For the complete list of hat-tricks see List of La Liga hat-tricks.

As of matches played 22 February 2020

Players in bold are still active in La Liga. Players in italics are still active outside La Liga. Players with at least 10 hat-tricks are shown in this table.

Rank	Player	Hat-tricks	Last hat-trick
1	(Argentina) Lionel Messi	36	22 February 2020
2	(Portugal) Cristiano Ronaldo	34	10 February 2018
3	(Spain) Telmo Zarra	23	15 March 1953
4	(Argentina) Alfredo Di Stéfano	22	15 March 1964
5	(Spain) Mundo	19	4 March 1951
6	(Spain) César Rodríguez	15	19 October 1952
7	(Spain) Isidro Lángara	13	15 December 1946
8	(Hungary) Ferenc Puskás	12	15 December 1963
9	(Hungary) László Kubala	11	19 March 1961
9	(Spain) Pahiño	11	11 September 1955
9	(Spain) Manuel Badenes	11	29 March 1958
12	(Spain) Quini	10	7 October 1981
12	(Uruguay) Luis Suárez	10	28 October 2018

Source: BDFútbol

==== Fastest goals ====
- Fastest goal scored in La Liga history: **7.22 seconds**, Joseba Llorente (for Real Valladolid v. Espanyol, 20 January 2008)
- Fastest to score first goal in La Liga: **29 seconds**, Jorge Galán (for Osasuna v. Real Valladolid, 23 September 2009)
- Fastest to score 20 La Liga goals in a single season: **12 games**, Cristiano Ronaldo (2014–15)
- Fastest 50 league goals: **35 games**, Isidro Lángara (for Oviedo (matchday 17, 24 March 1935, season 1934–35)
- Fastest to 100 La Liga goals: **80 games**, Isidro Lángara (for Oviedo (matchday 24, 30 March 1947, season 1946–47)
- Fastest to 150 La Liga goals: **140 games**, Cristiano Ronaldo (matchday 5, 22 September 2013, season 2013–14)
- Fastest to 200 La Liga goals: **178 games**, Cristiano Ronaldo (matchday 14, 6 December 2014, season 2014–15)
- Fastest to 250 La Liga goals: **228 games**, Cristiano Ronaldo (matchday 28, 5 March 2016, season 2015–16)
- Fastest to 300 La Liga goals: **286 games**, Cristiano Ronaldo (matchday 27, 3 March 2018, season 2017–18)

==== Youngest and oldest ====
- Oldest goalscorer: **40 years and 138 days**, Donato (for Deportivo La Coruña v Valencia, 17 May 2003)
- Youngest goalscorer: **16 years and 87 days**, Lamine Yamal (for Barcelona v Granada, 8 October 2023)

==== Others ====
- Most career league goals: **474**, Lionel Messi
- Most goals scored in a season: **50**, Lionel Messi (2011–12)
- Most league goals scored in a calendar year: **59**, Lionel Messi (2012)
- Most league home goals in a season (38 games, 19 home games): **35**, Lionel Messi (2011–12)
- Most league away goals in a season (38 games, 19 away games): **24**, Lionel Messi (2012–13)
- Most career La Liga matches scored in: **300**, Lionel Messi (2004–2021)
- Most league matches scored in a season (38 games): **27**, Lionel Messi (2012–13)
- Most league home matches scored in a season (38 games): **16**, Lionel Messi (2011–12)
- Most league away matches scored in a season (38 games): **15**, Lionel Messi (2012–13)
- Most opponents scored against in La Liga history: **38**, Lionel Messi
- Most opponents scored against in a season: **19**, joint record:
  - Ronaldo for Barcelona (1996–97) (42 games)
  - Cristiano Ronaldo for Real Madrid (2011–12) (38 games)
  - Lionel Messi for Barcelona (2012–13) (38 games)
- Most consecutive hat-tricks in one season: **3**, Isidro Lángara (for Oviedo (1934–35))
- Most goals scored in a game: **7**, joint record:
  - Agustín Sauto Arana (for Athletic Bilbao v Barcelona, 8 February 1931)
  - László Kubala (for Barcelona v Sporting Gijón, 10 February 1952)
- Most goals scored in different seasons: **19**, Agustín Gaínza (1940–59)
- Most consecutive league appearances scored in: **21**, Lionel Messi (33 goals, from matchday 11 to matchday 34, season 2012–13)
- Most consecutive home league matches scored in: **18**, Mariano Martín (37 goals, from matchday 22 season 1941–42 to matchday 6 season 1943–44)
- Most consecutive away league matches scored in: **13**, Lionel Messi (20 goals from matchday 8 to matchday 33, season 2012–13)
- Most hat-tricks scored in La Liga history: **36**, Lionel Messi
- Most league hat-tricks scored in a season: **8**, joint record:
  - Lionel Messi (2011–12)
  - Cristiano Ronaldo (2014–15)
- Most braces (2-goal matches) scored in La Liga history: **133**, Lionel Messi
- Fastest hat-trick in La Liga: **3 minutes and 57 seconds**, Alexander Sørloth (for Atlético Madrid v Real Sociedad, 10 May 2025)
- Oldest player to score a hat-trick in La Liga: **39 years and 241 days**, Jorge Molina (for Granada v Mallorca, 19 December 2021)
- Youngest player to score a hat-trick in La Liga: **17 years and 337 days**, José Iraragorri (for Athletic Bilbao v Real Sociedad, 16 February 1930)
- Most goals scored from direct free kicks: **39**, Lionel Messi
- Most goals from penalties in La Liga history: **61**, Cristiano Ronaldo
- Most penalties taken in La Liga history: **73**, Lionel Messi
- Most goals scored with different teams: **7**
  - Miquel Soler (Espanyol, Barcelona, Atlético Madrid, Sevilla, Real Madrid, Real Zaragoza, Mallorca)
  - Carlos Aranda (Villarreal, Albacete, Sevilla, Numancia, Osasuna, Real Zaragoza, Granada)
  - Roberto Soldado (Real Madrid, Osasuna, Getafe, Valencia, Villarreal, Granada, Levante)
  - Munir El Haddadi (Barcelona, Valencia, Alavés, Sevilla, Getafe, Las Palmas, Leganés)
- Only player to score 30+ goals in 8 different seasons: Lionel Messi (2004–2021)
- Only player to score 4 goals (super hat-tricks) in 2 consecutive matches in La Liga history in a single season: **2**, Luis Suárez (matchdays 34 and 35, season 2015–16)
- Only players to be involved in 7 goals in a single match in La Liga history: joint record:
  - Agustín Sauto Arana (for Athletic Bilbao vs Barcelona, 8 February 1931)
  - László Kubala (for Barcelona v Sporting Gijón, 10 February 1952)
  - Luis Suárez (for Barcelona v Deportivo de La Coruña, 20 April 2016)
- Most opening goals in La Liga history: **103**, Lionel Messi
- Most stadiums scored at in La Liga history: **37**, Lionel Messi
- Most goals scored as a substitute: **38**, Cristhian Stuani
- Most goals scored as a substitute in a season: **12**, Alexander Sørloth (2024–25)
- Most goals scored by a goalkeeper: **6**, joint record:
  - Carlos Fenoy
  - Nacho González
- Most goals scored by a goalkeeper in a season: **5**, Carlos Fenoy (1976–77)
- Most goals scored by a goalkeeper in a game: **2**, Nacho González (for Las Palmas v Osasuna, 20 May 2001)
- Farthest goal: **68 metres**
  - José Antonio (for Numancia v Sevilla, 13 November 2004)
  - Arda Güler (for Real Madrid v Elche, 14 March 2026)

=== Goalkeeping ===
==== Longest goalkeeping runs without conceding a goal ====
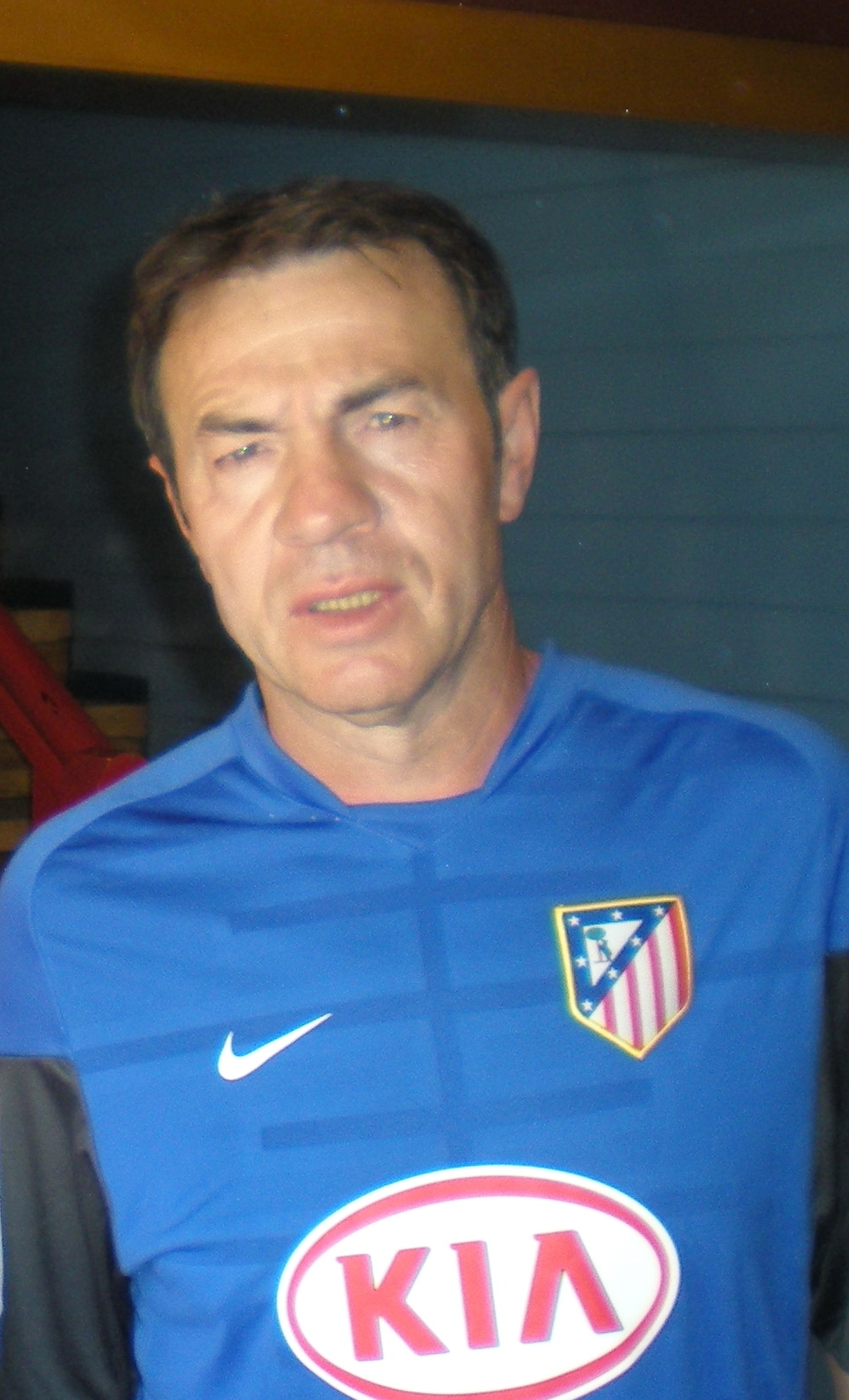
Abel Resino holds the record for the longest minutes without conceding goals in the history of La Liga.

Rank	Nat.	Player	Season(s)	Club(s)	Minutes
1	(Spain)	Abel Resino	1990–91	Atlético Madrid	1,275
2	(Spain)	Miguel Reina	1972–73	Barcelona	824
3	(Argentina)	Edgardo Madinabeytia	1965–66	Atlético Madrid	793
4	(Chile)	Claudio Bravo	2013–14 to 2014–15	Real Sociedad, Barcelona	776
5	(Spain)	Luis Arconada	1979–80	Real Sociedad	753

==== Others ====
- Most saves in a single season: **162**, Guillermo Ochoa (for Granada, 2016–17)
- Most clean sheets: **233**, Andoni Zubizarreta (66 for Athletic Bilbao, 123 for Barcelona and 44 for Valencia, 1981–1998)
- Most clean sheets in a season: **26**, joint record:
  - Francisco Liaño (for Deportivo La Coruña, 1993–94)
  - Marc-André ter Stegen (for Barcelona, 2022–23)
- Best conceded goal quota in a season (at least 20 matches):
  - 1 – 0.474 goals per game (18 goals in 38 matches), Francisco Liaño (for Deportivo La Coruña, 1993–94), Jan Oblak (for Atlético Madrid, 2015–16), Marc-André ter Stegen (for Barcelona, 2022–23)
  - 4 – 0.5 goals per game (16 goals in 32 matches), Víctor Valdés (for Barcelona, 2010–11)
- Longest start to a season with no goals conceded: **754 minutes**, Claudio Bravo (for Barcelona, 2014–15)
- Longest goalkeeping run without conceding a goal: **1,275** minutes, Abel Resino (for Atlético Madrid, 1990–91)
- Most penalties saved: **22**, Diego Alves for Almería and Valencia
- Most penalties saved in a single season: **6**, Diego Alves for Valencia, 2016–17

=== Assists ===
- Most assists: **192**, Lionel Messi
- Most assists in a season: **21**
  - Míchel (1987–88)
  - Xavi (2008–09)
  - Lionel Messi (2019–20)
- Most assists in a match: **5**
  - Juanito, for Real Madrid v Athletic Bilbao, 14 September 1980
  - Juanele, for Tenerife v Villarreal, 1 November 1998

=== Wins ===
- Most championships won: **12**, Paco Gento (all with Real Madrid)
- Most championships won by foreign player: **10**, Lionel Messi (all with Barcelona)
- Most matches won: **383**, Lionel Messi
- Most matches won in a season: **32**, Cristiano Ronaldo (2011–12)
- Most consecutive matches won: **25**, Sergio Busquets, 1 May 2010 – 2 March 2011

=== Disciplinary ===
- Most red cards: **21**, Sergio Ramos
- Most yellow cards: **194**, Sergio Ramos (180 + 14 second yellow cards)
- Fastest red card: **31 seconds**, Hugo Guillamón (for Valencia v Getafe, 13 August 2021)

== Managers ==
=== Most matches managed ===
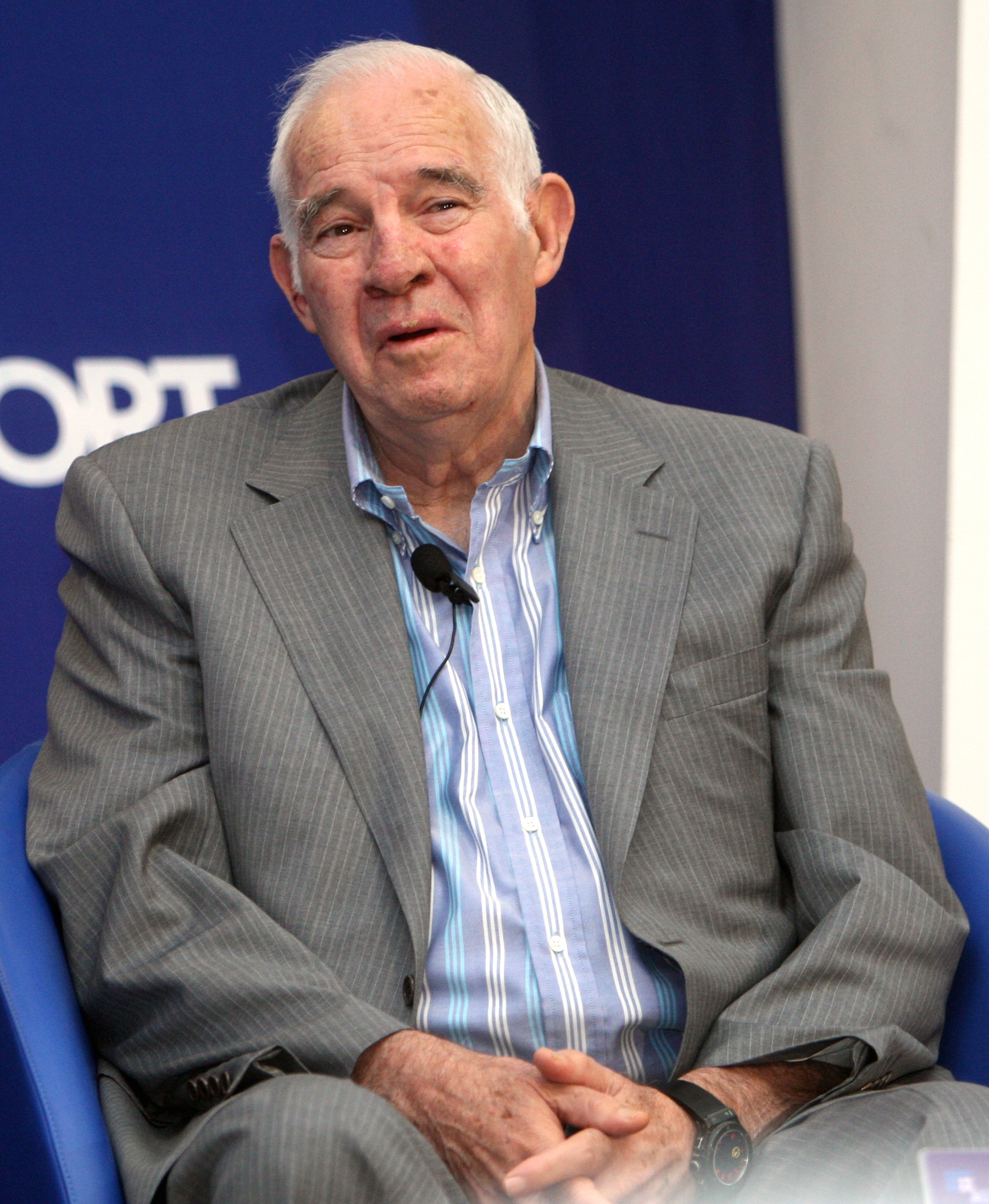
Luis Aragonés is the coach with the most matches managed in La Liga history, with 756.

As of matches played 25 May 2026.

Coaches in bold are still active in La Liga.

Rank	Nat.	Coach	Years	Matches
1	(Spain)	Luis Aragonés	1974–2004	756
2	(Spain)	Javier Irureta	1988–2008	612
3	(Spain)	Miguel Muñoz	1958–1982	608
4	(Spain)	**Ernesto Valverde**	2003–	594
5	(Chile)	**Manuel Pellegrini**	2004–	559
6	(Argentina)	**Diego Simeone**	2011–	553
7	(Spain)	Víctor Fernández	1990–2015	544
8	(Spain)	Joaquín Caparrós	1999–2025	517
9	(Spain)	Javier Clemente	1981–2012	511
10	(Slovakia)	Ferdinand Daučík	1950–1971	488
11	(Wales)	John Toshack	1985–2004	480
12	(Spain)	**Marcelino**	2006–	479
13	(Spain)	José Luis Mendilibar	2005–2023	468
14	(Mexico)	Javier Aguirre	2002–2024	466
15	(France)	Marcel Domingo	1958–1984	455
16	(Spain)	Ricardo Zamora	1939–1962	417
16	(Spain)	Miguel Ángel Lotina	1992–2012	417
18	(Spain)	José María Maguregui	1973–1990	415
19	(Spain)	Lorenzo Serra Ferrer	1983–2006	413
20	(Spain)	Gregorio Manzano	1999–2013	411
21	(Spain)	Unai Emery	2007–2022	410
22	(Serbia)	Radomir Antić	1988–2004	409
23	(Spain)	Carriega	1970–1986	397
24	(Spain)	Novoa	1979–1998	394
25	(Spain)	Antonio Barrios	1949–1972	380
25	(Spain)	Pasieguito	1963–1982	380
27	(Spain)	Arsenio Iglesias	1971–1996	363
27	(Spain)	**Quique Sánchez Flores**	2004–	363
29	(Argentina)	Helenio Herrera	1948–1981	359
30	(Spain)	Fernando Vázquez	1995–2013	357

=== Most matches won ===
As of matches played 25 May 2026.

Coaches in bold are still active in La Liga.

Rank	Nat.	Coach	Years	Matches	Wins
1	(Spain)	Luis Aragonés	1974–2004	756	344
2	(Argentina)	**Diego Simeone**	2011–	553	335
3	(Spain)	Miguel Muñoz	1958–1982	608	323
4	(Spain)	**Ernesto Valverde**	2003–	594	278
5	(Chile)	**Manuel Pellegrini**	2004–	559	264
6	(Spain)	Javier Irureta	1988–2008	612	259
7	(Slovakia)	Ferdinand Daučík	1950–1971	488	234
8	(Spain)	Javier Clemente	1981–2012	511	205
9	(Spain)	**Marcelino**	2006–	479	208
10	(Spain)	Víctor Fernández	1990–2015	544	202

=== Most titles won ===
Coach	Titles	Seasons	Clubs
(Spain) Miguel Muñoz	9	1960–61, 1961–62, 1962–63, 1963–64, 1964–65, 1966–67, 1967–68, 1968–69, 1971–72	Real Madrid
(Argentina) Helenio Herrera	4	1949–50, 1950–51, 1958–59, 1959–60	Atlético Madrid (2), Barcelona (2)
(Netherlands) Johan Cruyff	4	1990–91, 1991–92, 1992–93, 1993–94	Barcelona
(Uruguay) Enrique Fernández	3	1947–48, 1948–49, 1953–54	Barcelona (2), Real Madrid (1)
(Slovakia) Ferdinand Daucik	3	1951–52, 1952–53, 1955–56	Barcelona (2), Athletic Club Bilbao (1)
(Spain) Luis Molowny	3	1977–78, 1978–79, 1985–86	Real Madrid
(Netherlands) Leo Beenhakker	3	1986–87, 1987–88, 1988–89	Real Madrid
(Spain) Josep Guardiola	3	2008–09, 2009–10, 2010–11	Barcelona
(England) Fred Pentland	2	1929–30, 1930–31	Athletic Club Bilbao
(Spain) Ricardo Zamora	2	1939–40, 1940–41	Atlético Madrid
(Spain) Ramón Encinas	2	1941–42, 1945–46	València CF (1), Sevilla FC (1)
(Spain) José Villalonga	2	1954–55, 1956–57	Real Madrid
(Socialist Federal Republic of Yugoslavia) Miljan Miljanic	2	1974–75, 1975–76	Real Madrid
(Spain) Alberto Ormaetxea	2	1980–81, 1981–82	Real Sociedad
(Spain) Javier Clemente	2	1982–83, 1983–84	Athletic Club Bilbao
(Italy) Fabio Capello	2	1996–97, 2006–07	Real Madrid
(Netherlands) Louis van Gaal	2	1997–98, 1998–99	Barcelona
(Spain) Vicente del Bosque	2	2000–01, 2002–03	Real Madrid
(Spain) Rafael Benítez	2	2001–02, 2003–04	València CF
(Netherlands) Frank Rijkaard	2	2004–05, 2005–06	Barcelona
(Spain) Luis Enrique	2	2014–15, 2015–16	Barcelona
(Spain) Ernesto Valverde	2	2017–18, 2018–19	Barcelona
(France) Zinedine Zidane	2	2016–17, 2019–20	Real Madrid
(Argentina) Diego Pablo Simeone	2	2013–14, 2020–21	Atlético Madrid
(Italy) Carlo Ancelotti	2	2021–22, 2023–24	Real Madrid
(Germany) Hansi Flick	2	2024–25, 2025–26	Barcelona
