= 1951 Copa del Generalísimo =

49th Copa del Rey

Tournament details
- Country: Spain
- Teams: 14

Final positions
- Champions: FC Barcelona (10th title)
- Runners-up: Real Sociedad

Tournament statistics
- Matches played: 25
- Goals scored: 86 (3.44 per match)
- Top goal scorer(s): (Spain) Telmo Zarra (8 goals)

The 1951 Copa del Generalísimo was the 49th staging of the Copa del Rey, the Spanish football cup competition.

The competition began on 29 April 1951 and concluded on 27 May 1951 with the final. FC Barcelona defeated Real Sociedad by 3–0 in the final.

== First round ==
Team 1	Agg.	Team 2	1st leg	2nd leg
Deportivo La Coruña	1–2	Racing de Santander	1–0	0–2
Real Sociedad	5–2	Celta Vigo	4–1	1–1
Real Valladolid	4–7	Atlético Madrid	4–3	0–4
RCD Espanyol	5–7	Athletic Bilbao	4–2	1–5
Real Madrid	8–3	Valencia CF	3–2	5–1
Sevilla FC	1–5	FC Barcelona	1–2	0–3

Bye: Sporting de Gijón and Atlético Tetuán.

=== First leg ===
29 April 1951	Deportivo La Coruña	1–0	Racing de Santander	A Coruña
	Franco 15'	Report		Referee: Asensi Martín

29 April 1951	Real Sociedad	4–1	Celta Vigo	San Sebastián
	Caeiro 27'; Igoa 53'; Alsúa 67', 70'	Report	Vázquez 61'	Referee: Trapote López

29 April 1951	Real Valladolid	4–3	Atlético Madrid	Valladolid
	Pepín 3'; Lolo 59', 62', 82'	Report	Juncosa 18', 74'; Pérez Paya 22'	Referee: Barderí Gibert

29 April 1951	RCD Espanyol	4–2	Athletic Bilbao	Barcelona
	Egea 8', 34'; Arcas 14'; Celma 25' (pen.)	Report	Zarra 51'; Artetxe 56'	Referee: García Fernández

29 April 1951	Real Madrid	3–2	Valencia CF	Madrid
	Cabrera 39'; Roque Olsen 56'; Puchades 70' (o.g.)	Report	Badenes 9', 55'	Referee: Fombona Fernández

29 April 1951	Sevilla FC	1–2	FC Barcelona	Sevilla
	Araújo 34'	Report	Nicolau 4', 31'	Referee: Arqué Martín

=== Second leg ===
3 May 1951	Racing de Santander	2–0 (a.e.t.)	Deportivo La Coruña	Santander
	Ruiz Toro 28', 119'	Report		Referee: Rivero Lecuona

3 May 1951	Celta Vigo	1–1	Real Sociedad	Vigo
	Vázquez 43'	Report	Alsúa 48'	Referee: Zariquiegui Izco

3 May 1951	Atlético Madrid	4–0	Real Valladolid	Madrid
	Estruch 10'; Mújica 13', 81'; Carlsson 76'	Report		Referee: Bienzobas

3 May 1951	Athletic Bilbao	5–1	RCD Espanyol	Bilbao
	Zarra 48', 55', 75', 81' (pen.); Garay 53'	Report	Arcas 88'	Referee: Pérez Rodríguez

3 May 1951	Valencia CF	1–5	Real Madrid	Valencia
	Badenes 10'	Report	Cabrera 6', 8'; Roque Olsen 32', 58'; Sobrado 80'	Referee: Blanco Pérez

3 May 1951	FC Barcelona	3–0	Sevilla FC	Barcelona
	Kubala 23' (pen.); Peiró 65'; Basora 75'	Report		Referee: Jáuregui Ansó

== Quarter-finals ==
Team 1	Agg.	Team 2	1st leg	2nd leg
Athletic Bilbao	5–2	Sporting de Gijón	3–1	2–1
Real Sociedad	6–2	Racing de Santander	3–2	3–0
Atlético Madrid	1–2	Real Madrid	0–1	1–1
Atlético Tetuán	2–7	FC Barcelona	1–3	1–4

Source: RSSSF

=== First leg ===
6 May 1951	Athletic Bilbao	3–1	Sporting de Gijón	Bilbao
	Gaínza 6'; Zarra 75', 80'	Report	Garro 22'	Referee: Marrón Martín

6 May 1951	Real Sociedad	3–2	Racing de Santander	San Sebastián
	Ontoria 26' (pen.), 61'; Pérez 49'	Report	Pin 4'; Ruiz Toro 64' (pen.)	Referee: Azón Roma

6 May 1951	Atlético Madrid	0–1	Real Madrid	Madrid
		Report	Imbelloni 68'	Referee: Zariquiegui Izco

6 May 1951	Atlético Tetuán	1–3	FC Barcelona	Tétouan
	Chicha 10'	Report	Kubala 8', 13'; César 42'	Referee: Asensi Martín

=== Second leg ===
10 May 1951	Sporting de Gijón	1–2	Athletic Bilbao	Gijón
	Campos 65'	Report	Zarra 49'; Artetxe 80'	Referee: Rivero Lecuona

10 May 1951	Racing de Santander	0–3	Real Sociedad	Santander
		Report	Barinaga 22', 32', 80'	Referee: Mazagatos Vicario

10 May 1951	Real Madrid	1–1	Atlético Madrid	Madrid
	Pahiño 53'	Report	Juncosa 64'	Referee: Giménez Molina

10 May 1951	FC Barcelona	4–1	Atlético Tetuán	Barcelona
	Segarra 19'; Kubala 23', 57', 60'	Report	Chicha 70' (pen.)	Referee: Blanco Pérez

== Semi-finals ==
Team 1	Agg.	Team 2	1st leg	2nd leg
Real Sociedad	3–0	Real Madrid	1–0	2–0
FC Barcelona	2–1	Athletic Bilbao	0–0	2–1

Source: RSSSF

=== First leg ===
13 May 1951	Real Sociedad	1–0	Real Madrid	San Sebastián
	Artigas 83'	Report		Referee: Blanco Pérez

13 May 1951	FC Barcelona	0–0	Athletic Bilbao	Barcelona
		Report		Referee: Arqué Martín

=== Second leg ===
20 May 1951	Real Madrid	0–2	Real Sociedad	Madrid
		Report	Barinaga 19'; Caeiro 73'	Referee: Zariquiegui Izco

20 May 1951	Athletic Bilbao	1–2	FC Barcelona	Bilbao
	Panizo 81'	Report	Nicolau 4'; César 29'	Referee: Asensi Martín

== Final ==
Team 1	Score	Team 2
FC Barcelona	3–0	Real Sociedad

27 May 1951
17:15 CET

FC Barcelona	3–0	Real Sociedad
César 31', 67'; Gonzalvo 44'	Report (in Spanish)

Estadio Chamartín, Madrid
Attendance: 75,000
Referee: Manuel Asensi

Copa del Generalísimo
winners
FC Barcelona
10th title

== Top goalscorers ==
Goalscorers	Goals	Team
(Spain) Telmo Zarra	8	Athletic Bilbao
(Hungary) László Kubala	6	FC Barcelona
(Spain) Sabino Barinaga	4	Real Sociedad
(Spain) César Rodríguez	4	FC Barcelona
(Argentina) Roque Olsen	3	Real Madrid
(Spain) Rafael Alsúa	3	Real Sociedad
(Spain) Emilio Ruiz Toro	3	Racing de Santander
(Spain) Lolo	3	Real Valladolid
(Argentina) Mateo Nicolau	3	FC Barcelona
(Spain) José Juncosa	3	Atlético Madrid

Source: BDFutbol
