= Pichichi Trophy =

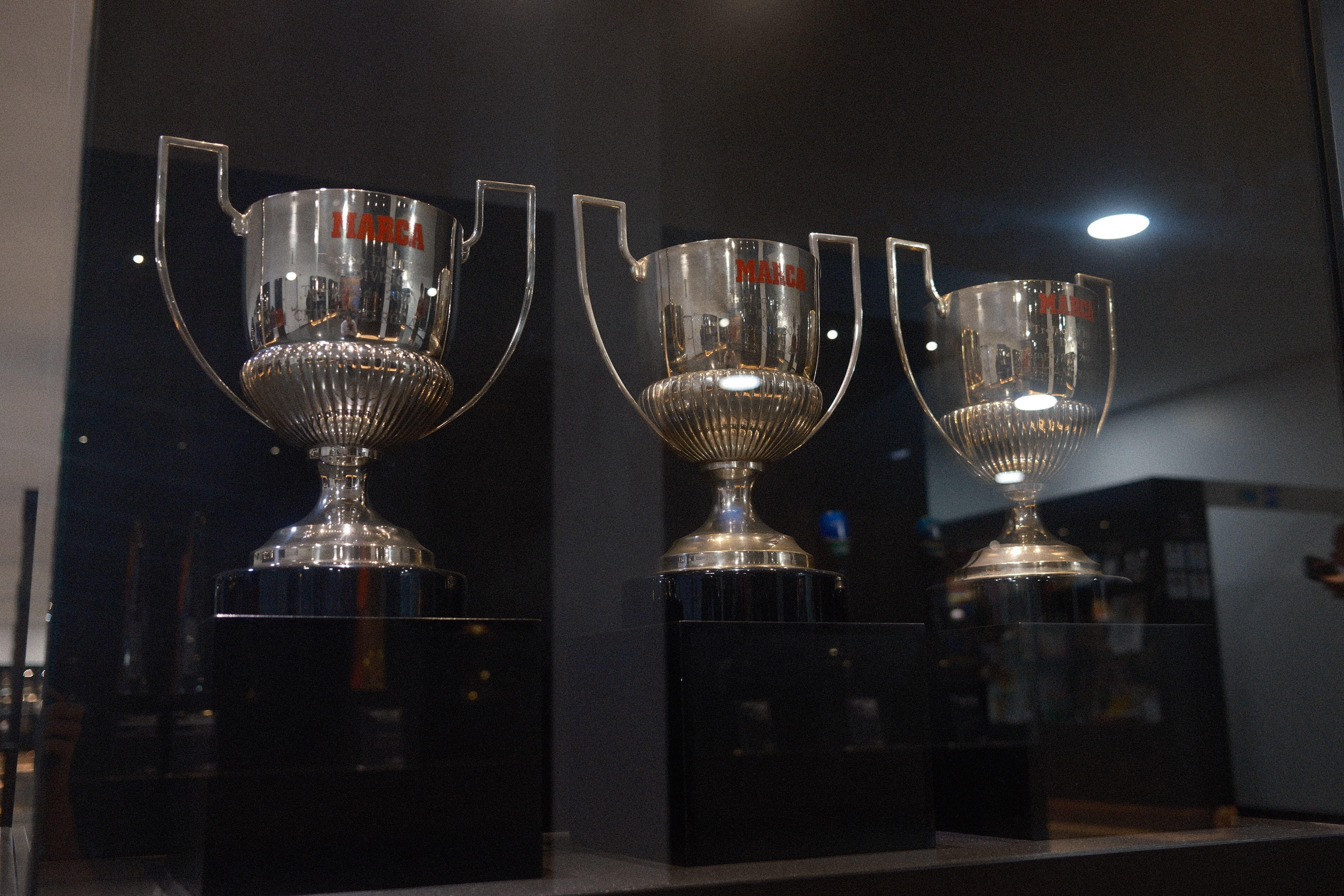
- Pichichi Trophies at Museu CR7
- Awarded for: Leading goalscorer from each La Liga season
- Presented by: Marca (1952–present)
- First award: 1929 (Note: The top scorers from each La Liga season before the award's creation were retroactively named Pichichi winners by Marca)
- Currently held by: Men: (France) Kylian Mbappé (2nd award) Women: (Spain) Claudia Pina (1st award)

Highlights
- Most wins: Men: (Argentina) Lionel Messi (8) Women: (Spain) Jenni Hermoso (5)
- Website: www.marca.com/en

In Spanish football, the Pichichi Trophy (Spanish: Trofeo Pichichi) is awarded by the sport newspaper Marca to the top goalscorer of each La Liga season. Named after the Athletic Bilbao striker Rafael "Pichichi" Moreno, the trophy has been awarded annually since the 1952–53 season. All top scorers who preceded the award's creation were retroactively named Pichichi winners by Marca. Since the 2014–15 season, the top scorer of the women's Liga F is also awarded the Pichichi Trophy.

The Pichichi is not officially recognised by the league's governing body, the Liga Nacional de Fútbol Profesional. As the award is based on Marca's subjective criteria, its data may differ from the official match delegate reports. For the top scorers in the Spanish football league according to La Liga data, see List of La Liga top scorers. The player with the most Pichichi wins is Lionel Messi with eight, all with Barcelona.

== Winners ==
Key

Player also won the European Golden Shoe (first awarded in 1968)

=== Men ===
Telmo Zarra won the inaugural Pichichi Trophy in 1953 and amassed a total of six. He remains the Spanish player who has won the award the most times.

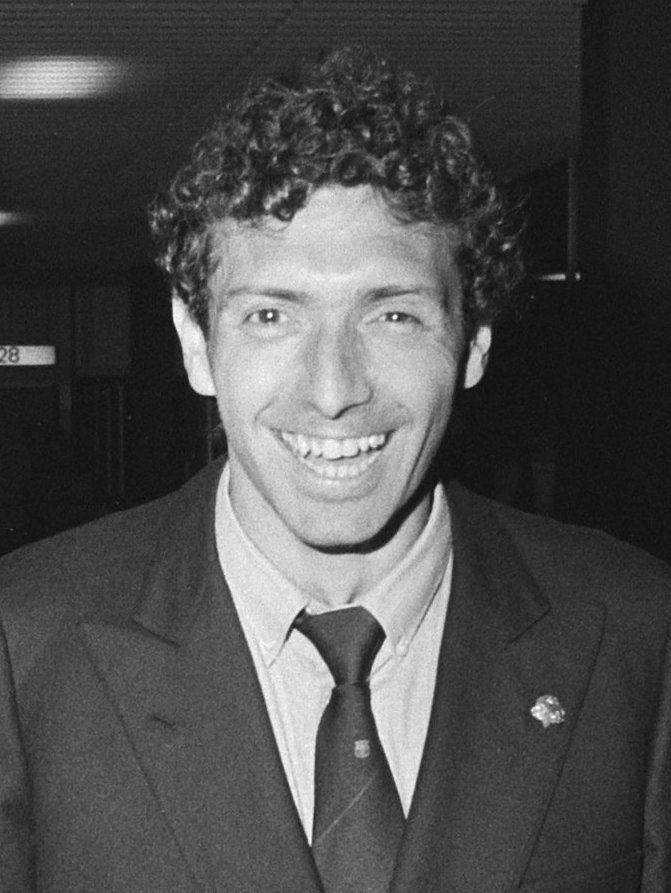
Quini won the Pichichi Trophy with two different clubs.

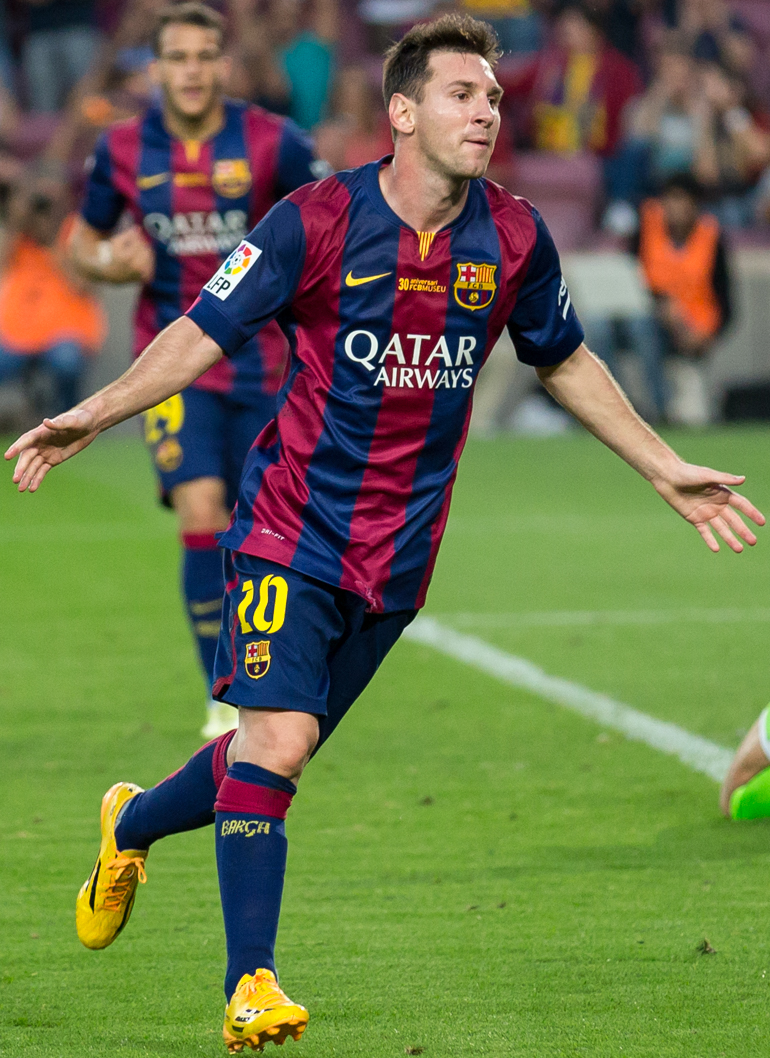
Lionel Messi has won the Pichichi Trophy a record eight times

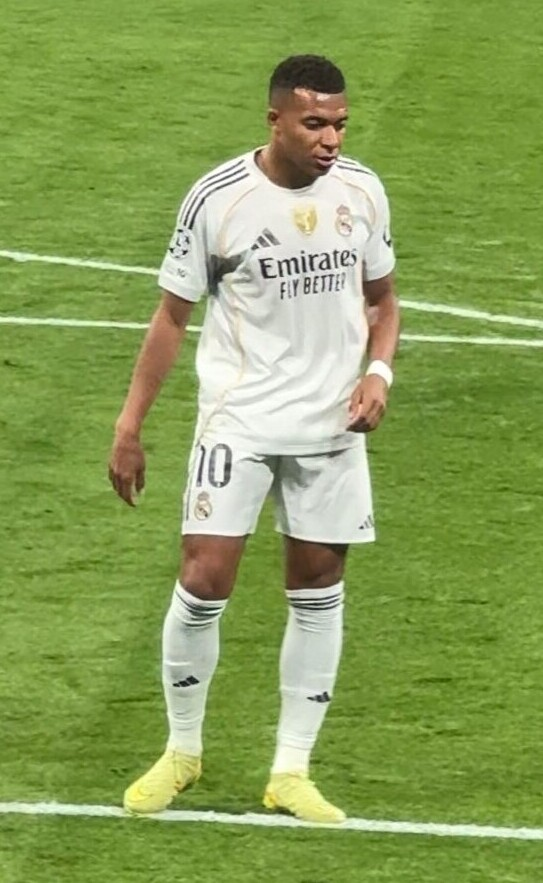
Real Madrid striker Kylian Mbappé won the Pichichi Trophy, during the 2024–25 and 2025–26 campaign.

Season	Player(s)	Club(s)	Apps	Goals	Ratio
1929	(Spain) Paco Bienzobas	Real Sociedad	18	14 (Note: According to Liga de Fútbol Profesional (LFP) match delegate reports, Bienzobas scored 17 goals.)	0.778
1929–30	(Spain) Guillermo Gorostiza	Athletic Bilbao	18	19 (Note: According to LFP match delegate reports, Gorostiza scored 20 goals.)	1.056
1930–31	(Spain) Bata	Athletic Bilbao	17	27	1.588
1931–32	(Second Spanish Republic) Guillermo Gorostiza (2)	Athletic Bilbao	15	12 (Note: According to LFP match delegate reports, Bata was top scorer with 13 goals.)	0.8
1932–33	(Second Spanish Republic) Manuel Olivares	Real Madrid	14	16	1.143
1933–34	(Second Spanish Republic) Isidro Lángara	Oviedo	18	27 (Note: According to LFP match delegate reports, Lángara scored 26 goals.)	1.5
1934–35	(Second Spanish Republic) Isidro Lángara (2)	Oviedo	22	26 (Note: According to LFP match delegate reports, Lángara scored 27 goals.)	1.182
1935–36	(Second Spanish Republic) Isidro Lángara (3)	Oviedo	21	28 (Note: According to LFP match delegate reports, Lángara scored 28 goals.)	1.333
1939–40	(Francoist Spain) Victorio Unamuno	Athletic Bilbao	22	20	0.909
1940–41	(Francoist Spain) Pruden	Atlético Madrid	22	30 (Note: According to LFP match delegate reports, Pruden scored 33 goals.)	1.364
1941–42	(Francoist Spain) Mundo	Valencia	25	27	1.08
1942–43	(Francoist Spain) Mariano Martín	Barcelona	23	32 (Note: According to LFP match delegate reports, Martín scored 30 goals.)	1.391
1943–44	(Francoist Spain) Mundo (2)	Valencia	26	27 (Note: According to LFP match delegate reports, Mundo scored 28 goals.)	1.038
1944–45	(Francoist Spain) Telmo Zarra	Athletic Bilbao	26	19 (Note: According to LFP match delegate reports, Zarra scored 20 goals.)	0.731
1945–46	(Francoist Spain) Telmo Zarra (2)	Athletic Bilbao	18	24	1.333
1946–47	(Francoist Spain) Telmo Zarra (3)	Athletic Bilbao	24	34 (Note: According to LFP match delegate reports, Zarra scored 33 goals.)	1.417
1947–48	(Francoist Spain) Pahiño	Celta Vigo	22	23 (Note: According to LFP match delegate reports, Pahiño scored 20 goals.)	1.045
1948–49	(Francoist Spain) César	Barcelona	24	28 (Note: According to LFP match delegate reports, César scored 27 goals.)	1.167
1949–50	(Francoist Spain) Telmo Zarra (4)	Athletic Bilbao	26	25 (Note: According to LFP match delegate reports, Zarra scored 24 goals.)	0.962
1950–51	(Francoist Spain) Telmo Zarra (5)	Athletic Bilbao	30	38	1.267
1951–52	(Francoist Spain) Pahiño (2)	Real Madrid	27	28	1.037
1952–53	(Francoist Spain) Telmo Zarra (6)	Athletic Bilbao	29	24	0.828
1953–54	(Argentina) Alfredo Di Stéfano	Real Madrid	28	27	0.964
1954–55	(Francoist Spain) Juan Arza	Sevilla	29	28	0.966
1955–56	(Argentina) Alfredo Di Stéfano (2)	Real Madrid	30	24	0.8
1956–57	(Francoist Spain) Alfredo Di Stéfano (3)	Real Madrid	30	31	1.033
1957–58	(Francoist Spain) Ricardo Alós	Valencia	29	19	0.655
1957–58	(Francoist Spain) Manuel Badenes	Valladolid	29	19	0.655
1957–58	(Francoist Spain) Alfredo Di Stéfano (4)	Real Madrid	30	19	0.633
1958–59	(Francoist Spain) Alfredo Di Stéfano (5)	Real Madrid	28	23	0.821
1959–60	(Hungary) Ferenc Puskás	Real Madrid	24	26 (Note: According to LFP match delegate reports, Puskás scored 25 goals.)	1.083
1960–61	(Hungary) Ferenc Puskás (2)	Real Madrid	28	27 (Note: According to LFP match delegate reports, Puskás scored 28 goals.)	0.964
1961–62	(Peru) Juan Seminario	Zaragoza	30	25	0.833
1962–63	(Hungary) Ferenc Puskás (3)	Real Madrid	30	26	0.867
1963–64	(Hungary) Ferenc Puskás (4)	Real Madrid	25	20 (Note: According to LFP match delegate reports, Puskás scored 21 goals.)	0.8
1964–65	(Paraguay) Cayetano Ré	Barcelona	30	25 (Note: According to LFP match delegate reports, Ré scored 26 goals.)	0.833
1965–66	(Francoist Spain) Vavá II	Elche	30	19 (Note: According to LFP match delegate reports, Vavá scored 15 goals; Luis Aragonés was top scorer with 18 goals.)	0.633
1966–67	(Brazil) Waldo	Valencia	30	24	0.8
1967–68	(Francoist Spain) Fidel Uriarte	Athletic Bilbao	24	22	0.917
1968–69	(Francoist Spain) Amancio	Real Madrid	29	14	0.483
1968–69	(Francoist Spain) José Eulogio Gárate	Atlético Madrid	30	14	0.467
1969–70	(Francoist Spain) Amancio (2)	Real Madrid	29	16	0.552
1969–70	(Francoist Spain) Luis Aragonés	Atlético Madrid	30	16	0.533
1969–70	(Francoist Spain) José Eulogio Gárate (2)	Atlético Madrid	30	16	0.533
1970–71	(Francoist Spain) José Eulogio Gárate (3)	Atlético Madrid	28	17	0.607
1970–71	(Francoist Spain) Carles Rexach	Barcelona	28	17	0.607
1971–72	(Francoist Spain) Enrique Porta	Granada	31	20	0.645
1972–73	(Francoist Spain) Marianín	Oviedo	32	19	0.594
1973–74	(Francoist Spain) Quini	Sporting Gijón	34	20	0.588
1974–75	(Francoist Spain) Carlos	Athletic Bilbao	32	19	0.594
1975–76	(Francoist Spain) Quini (2)	Sporting Gijón	34	18 (Note: According to LFP match delegate reports, Quini scored 21 goals.)	0.529
1976–77	(Argentina) Mario Kempes	Valencia	34	24	0.706
1977–78	(Argentina) Mario Kempes (2)	Valencia	34	28	0.824
1978–79	(Austria) Hans Krankl	Barcelona	30	29	0.967
1979–80	(Spain) Quini (3)	Sporting Gijón	34	24	0.706
1980–81	(Spain) Quini (4)	Barcelona	30	20	0.667
1981–82	(Spain) Quini (5)	Barcelona	32	26 (Note: According to LFP match delegate reports, Quini scored 27 goals.)	0.813
1982–83	(Spain) Poli Rincón	Real Betis	30	20	0.667
1983–84	(Uruguay) Jorge da Silva	Valladolid	30	17	0.567
1983–84	(Spain) Juanito	Real Madrid	31	17	0.548
1984–85	(Mexico) Hugo Sánchez	Atlético Madrid	33	19	0.576
1985–86	(Mexico) Hugo Sánchez (2)	Real Madrid	33	22	0.667
1986–87	(Mexico) Hugo Sánchez (3)	Real Madrid	41	34	0.829
1987–88	(Mexico) Hugo Sánchez (4)	Real Madrid	36	29	0.806
1988–89	(Brazil) Baltazar	Atlético Madrid	36	35	0.972
1989–90	(Mexico) Hugo Sánchez (5)	Real Madrid	35	38	1.086
1990–91	(Spain) Emilio Butragueño	Real Madrid	35	19	0.543
1991–92	(Spain) Manolo	Atlético Madrid	36	27	0.75
1992–93	(Brazil) Bebeto	Deportivo La Coruña	37	29	0.784
1993–94	(Brazil) Romário	Barcelona	33	30	0.909
1994–95	(Chile) Iván Zamorano	Real Madrid	38	28	0.737
1995–96	(Spain) Juan Antonio Pizzi	Tenerife	41	31	0.756
1996–97	(Brazil) Ronaldo	Barcelona	37	34	0.919
1997–98	(Italy) Christian Vieri	Atlético Madrid	24	24	1
1998–99	(Spain) Raúl	Real Madrid	37	25	0.676
1999–2000	(Spain) Salva	Racing Santander	36	27	0.75
2000–01	(Spain) Raúl (2)	Real Madrid	36	24	0.667
2001–02	(Spain) Diego Tristán	Deportivo La Coruña	35	21 (Note: According to LFP match delegate reports, Tristán scored 20 goals.)	0.6
2002–03	(Netherlands) Roy Makaay	Deportivo La Coruña	38	29	0.763
2003–04	(Brazil) Ronaldo (2)	Real Madrid	32	25	0.781
2004–05	(Uruguay) Diego Forlán	Villarreal	38	25 (Note: According to LFP match delegate reports, Samuel Eto'o was joint top scorer with 25 goals; Marca credits Eto'o with 24 goals.)	0.658
2005–06	(Cameroon) Samuel Eto'o	Barcelona	34	26	0.765
2006–07	(Netherlands) Ruud van Nistelrooy	Real Madrid	37	25	0.676
2007–08	(Spain) Dani Güiza	Mallorca	37	27	0.73
2008–09	(Uruguay) Diego Forlán (2)	Atlético Madrid	33	32	0.97
2009–10	(Argentina) Lionel Messi	Barcelona	35	34	0.971
2010–11	(Portugal) Cristiano Ronaldo	Real Madrid	34	40 (Note: According to LFP match delegate reports, Ronaldo scored 40 goals.)	1.206
2011–12	(Argentina) Lionel Messi (2)	Barcelona	37	50	1.351
2012–13	(Argentina) Lionel Messi (3)	Barcelona	32	46	1.438
2013–14	(Portugal) Cristiano Ronaldo (2)	Real Madrid	30	31	1.033
2014–15	(Portugal) Cristiano Ronaldo (3)	Real Madrid	35	48	1.371
2015–16	(Uruguay) Luis Suárez	Barcelona	35	40	1.143
2016–17	(Argentina) Lionel Messi (4)	Barcelona	34	37	1.088
2017–18	(Argentina) Lionel Messi (5)	Barcelona	36	34	0.944
2018–19	(Argentina) Lionel Messi (6)	Barcelona	34	36	1.059
2019–20	(Argentina) Lionel Messi (7)	Barcelona	33	25	0.758
2020–21	(Argentina) Lionel Messi (8)	Barcelona	35	30	0.857
2021–22	(France) Karim Benzema	Real Madrid	32	27	0.844
2022–23	(Poland) Robert Lewandowski	Barcelona	34	23	0.676
2023–24	(Ukraine) Artem Dovbyk	Girona	36	24	0.667
2024–25	(France) Kylian Mbappé	Real Madrid	34	31	0.912
2025–26	(France) Kylian Mbappé (2)	Real Madrid	31	25	0.806

=== Women ===
Season	Player(s)	Club(s)	Apps	Goals	Ratio
2004–05	(Spain) Marta Cubí	Espanyol	?	32	?
2005–06	(Spain) Auxi Jiménez	Híspalis	?	29	?
2006–07	(Spain) Adriana Martín	Espanyol	26	30	1.15
2007–08	(Spain) Natalia Pablos	Rayo Vallecano	?	24	?
2008–09	(Spain) Erika Vázquez	Athletic Bilbao	29	32	1.10
2009–10	(Spain) Adriana Martín (2)	Rayo Vallecano	28	35	1.25
2010–11	(Spain) Verónica Boquete	Espanyol	28	39	1.39
2011–12	(Spain) Sonia Bermúdez	Barcelona	34	38	1.11
2012–13	(Spain) Natalia Pablos (2)	Rayo Vallecano	27	27	1.00
2012–13	(Spain) Sonia Bermúdez (2)	Barcelona	27	27	1.00
2013–14	(Spain) Sonia Bermúdez (3)	Barcelona	27	27	1.00
2014–15	(Spain) Sonia Bermúdez (4)	Barcelona	28	22	0.78
2014–15	(Spain) Adriana Martín (3)	Levante	29	22	0.75
2015–16	(Spain) Jenni Hermoso	Barcelona	29	24	0,82
2016–17	(Spain) Jenni Hermoso (2)	Barcelona	27	35	1.29
2017–18	(Mexico) Charlyn Corral	Levante	29	24	0.82
2018–19	(Spain) Jenni Hermoso (3)	Atlético Madrid	28	24	0.85
2019–20	(Spain) Jenni Hermoso (4)	Barcelona	19	23	1.21
2020–21	(Spain) Jenni Hermoso (5)	Barcelona	26	31	1.19
2021–22	(Nigeria) Asisat Oshoala	Barcelona	19	20	1.05
2021–22	(Brazil) Geyse Ferreira	Madrid CFF	27	20	0.74
2022–23	(Spain) Alba Redondo	Levante	30	27	0.90
2023–24	(Norway) Caroline Graham Hansen	Barcelona	25	21	0.84
2024–25	(Poland) Ewa Pajor	Barcelona	28	25	0.89
2025–26	(Spain) Claudia Pina	Barcelona	27	21	0.78

== Statistics ==
=== Wins by player (multiple) ===
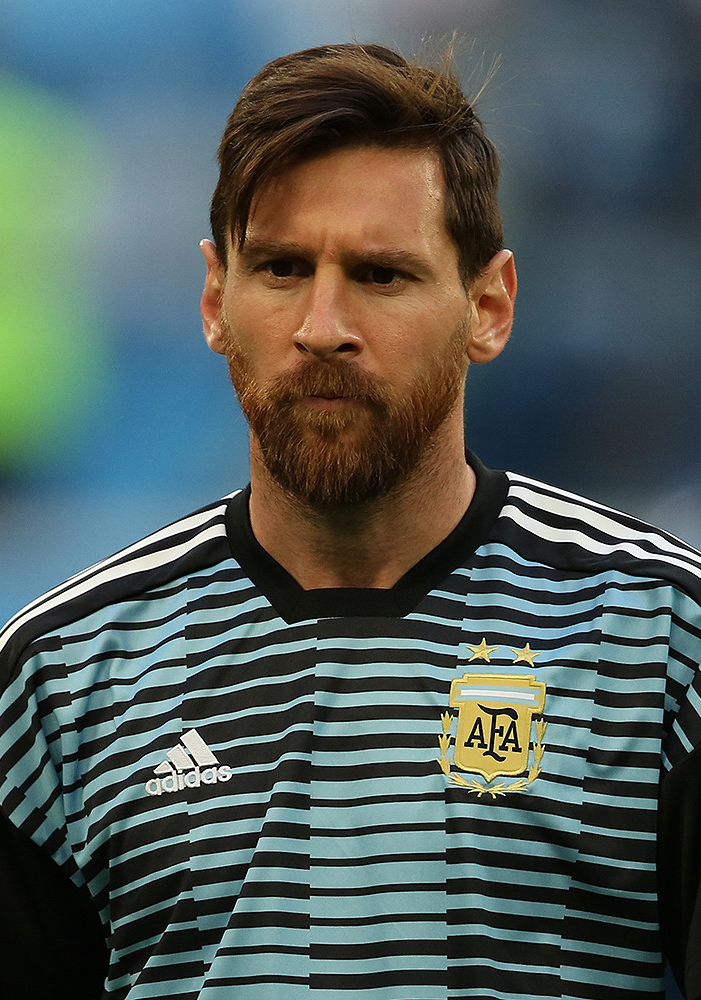
Lionel Messi has won a record eight Pichichi trophies.

Player	Wins	Seasons
(Argentina) Lionel Messi	8	2009–10, 2011–12, 2012–13, 2016–17, 2017–18, 2018–19, 2019–20, 2020–21
(Spain) Telmo Zarra	6	1944–45, 1945–46, 1946–47, 1949–50, 1950–51, 1952–53
(Spain) Alfredo Di Stéfano	5	1953–54, 1955–56, 1956–57, 1957–58, 1958–59
(Spain) Quini	5	1973–74, 1975–76, 1979–80, 1980–81, 1981–82
(Mexico) Hugo Sánchez	5	1984–85, 1985–86, 1986–87, 1987–88, 1989–90
(Spain) Jenni Hermoso	5	2015–16, 2016–17, 2018–19, 2019–20, 2020–21
(Hungary) Ferenc Puskás	4	1959–60, 1960–61, 1962–63, 1963–64
(Spain) Sonia Bermúdez	4	2011–12, 2012–13, 2013–14, 2014–15
(Spain) Isidro Lángara	3	1933–34, 1934–35, 1935–36
(Spain) José Eulogio Gárate	3	1968–69, 1969–70, 1970–71
(Portugal) Cristiano Ronaldo	3	2010–11, 2013–14, 2014–15
(Spain) Adriana Martín	3	2006–07, 2009–10, 2014–15
(Spain) Guillermo Gorostiza	2	1929–30, 1931–32
(Spain) Mundo	2	1941–42, 1943–44
(Spain) Pahiño	2	1947–48, 1951–52
(Spain) Amancio	2	1968–69, 1969–70
(Argentina) Mario Kempes	2	1976–77, 1977–78
(Spain) Raúl	2	1998–99, 2000–01
(Brazil) Ronaldo	2	1996–97, 2003–04
(Uruguay) Diego Forlán	2	2004–05, 2008–09
(Spain) Natalia Pablos	2	2007–08, 2012–13
(France) Kylian Mbappé	2	2024–25, 2025–26

=== Wins by club ===
Club	Players (Men)	Total (Men)	Players (Women)	Total (Women)	Players	Total
(Catalonia) Barcelona	12	20	6	12	18	32
(Community of Madrid) Real Madrid	15	30	-	-	15	30
(Basque Country (autonomous community)) Athletic Bilbao	6	12	1	1	7	13
(Community of Madrid) Atlético Madrid	8	10	1	1	9	11
(Valencian Community) Valencia	4	6	-	-	4	6
(Asturias) Oviedo	2	4	-	-	2	4
(Asturias) Sporting Gijón	1	3	-	-	1	3
(Galicia (Spain)) Deportivo La Coruña	3	3	-	-	3	3
(Catalonia) Espanyol	-	-	3	3	3	3
(Valencian Community) Levante	-	-	3	3	3	3
(Community of Madrid) Rayo Vallecano	-	-	2	3	2	3
(Castile and León) Valladolid	2	2	-	-	2	2
(Basque Country (autonomous community)) Real Sociedad	1	1	-	-	1	1
(Galicia (Spain)) Celta Vigo	1	1	-	-	1	1
(Andalusia) Sevilla	1	1	-	-	1	1
(Aragon) Zaragoza	1	1	-	-	1	1
(Valencian Community) Elche	1	1	-	-	1	1
(Andalusia) Granada	1	1	-	-	1	1
(Andalusia) Real Betis	1	1	-	-	1	1
(Canary Islands) Tenerife	1	1	-	-	1	1
(Cantabria) Racing Santander	1	1	-	-	1	1
(Valencian Community) Villarreal	1	1	-	-	1	1
(Balearic Islands) Mallorca	1	1	-	-	1	1
(Catalonia) Girona	1	1	-	-	1	1
(Community of Madrid) Madrid CFF	-	-	1	1	1	1
(Andalusia) C.D. Hispalis	-	-	1	1	1	1

== See also ==
- Spanish football top scorers, based on official La Liga match delegate reports
- Zarra Trophy, awarded by Marca to the Spanish top goalscorer in La Liga
- Ricardo Zamora Trophy, awarded by Marca to the top goalkeeper in La Liga
- List of top international association football goal scorers by country
