= Mateo Nicolau =

Argentinian footballer (1920–2005)

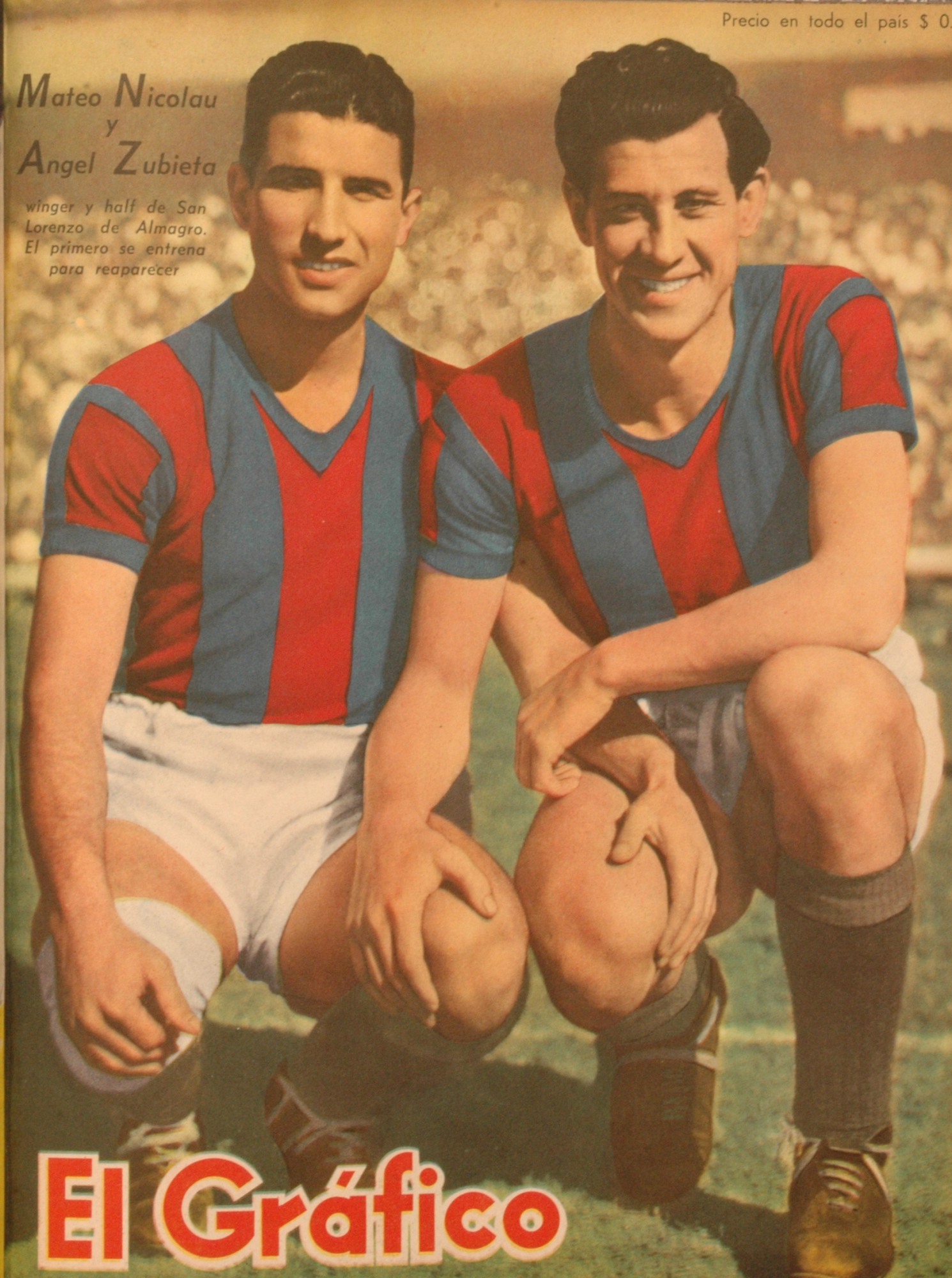
- Nicolau and Ángel Zubieta in San Lorenzo

Personal information
- Full name: Mateo Nicolau Garí
- Date of birth: 18 August 1920
- Place of birth: General Pico, Argentina
- Date of death: 29 October 2005 (aged 85)
- Place of death: León, Guanajuato, Mexico
- Position: Forward

Youth career
- Cultural Argentino

Senior career*
Years	Team	Apps	(Gls)
1935–1937	Central Silverino		
1937–1940	Atlético Tucumán		
1940–1943	San Lorenzo		
1943–1945	Club América		
1945–1948	Atlante		
1948–1952	Barcelona	63	(16)
1952–1957	Zacatepec		
- * Club domestic league appearances and goals

Mateo Nicolau Garí (18 August 1920 – 29 October 2005) was an Argentinian footballer who played as a forward for San Lorenzo in Argentina, Club América in Mexico, and most notably for Barcelona in Catalonia from 1948 to 1952.

== Early life ==
Mateo Nicolau was born in the Argentine city of General Pico in La Pampa Province on 18 August 1920, as the son of Juan Nicolau and Juana Garí, an immigrant family from Mallorca who had moved to Trenel before settling in Pico. He was the youngest of eight children, the first four born in Spain and the last four in Argentina.

His brother-in-law was the actor and film director Hugo del Carril.

== Career ==
=== Early career ===
Nicolau began his career in the youth ranks of Cultural Argentino, where he played alongside his older brothers Miguel and Gabriel. During this period, he briefly left football to join the Navy, but he soon opted for a football career, joining Central Silverino in 1935, aged only 15, from which he joined Atlético Tucumán, where he stayed for three years, from 1937 until 1940. He then signed for San Lorenzo, making his debut against Ferro on 16 June 1940, and staying there for three years, until 1943, scoring a total of 9 goals in 48 matches. In 1944, he signed for Mexican side Club América, doing so without authorization since Mexico was not a member of FIFA. The following year, in 1945, Nicolau signed for Atlante, where he was a member of a historic forward line that also included Fello Meza and Martí Ventolrà, which scored 121 goals in 1945–46 and then won the club's first professional championship in 1946–47. Such was his talent that several FC Barcelona fans living in Mexico began contacting the club recommending his signing, including former Barça player Ventolrà.

=== FC Barcelona ===
In 1948, the 28-year-old Nicolau was signed by FC Barcelona, where he played for four seasons, until 1952. Due to bureaucratic problems with the Argentine Football Association, he had to wait until 10 October 1948 to make his debut for Barça, which ended in a 4–0 win over Alcoyano. The following day, the journalists of the Spanish weekly magazine Vida Deportiva described him as "a cool, scientific player, with a touch of the ball that is rare in our latitudes and a perfect sense of how to break free".

Together with the likes of Mariano Gonzalvo, László Kubala, and César, he was a member of the great Barça team of the early 1950s that won two La Liga titles (1948–49 and 1951–52), two Latin Cup titles in 1949 and 1952, two Copa Eva Duarte titles in 1948 and 1952, and back-to-back Copa del Rey titles in 1951 and 1952, starting in the former final, in which he helped his side to a 3–0 win over Real Sociedad. He also started in the 1948 Eva Duarte final, helping his side to a 1–0 win over Sevilla, and in the following year, on 12 October 1949, he again started the final, and this time he even scored, but Barça still lost 7–4 in extra-time to Valencia. On 24 September 1950, Nicolau scored a brace in Barça's largest ever win over Real Madrid (7–2). In total, he scored 24 goals in 75 official goals, including 16 goals in 63 La Liga matches. Barcelona sources describe him as "always threatening, seriousness and humility".

=== Later career ===
A tear in his piriformis muscle kept him out for most of the 1951–52 season, at the end of which he stated that he was returning to Mexico "to make way for the youth". There, he won the 1946–47 Mexican league title with Zacatepec, with whom he played for five years, from 1952 until 1957, when he retired.

== Death ==
Nicolau died in León, Guanajuato on 29 October 2005, at the age of 85.

== See also ==
- List of foreign Liga MX players

== Honours ==
Atlante

- Mexican Primera División
  - Champions (1): 1946–47

FC Barcelona

- La Liga
  - Champions (2): 1948–49, 1951–52
- Copa del Rey
  - Champions (2): 1951 and 1952
- Latin Cup
  - Champions (2): 1949 and 1952
- Copa Eva Duarte
  - Champions (1): 1948 and 1952

Zacatepec

- Mexican Primera División
  - Champions (1): 1954–55
