= 1947–48 La Liga =

17th season of La Liga

Primera División
- Season: 1947–48
- Champions: Barcelona (3rd title)
- Relegated: Real Sociedad; Real Gijón
- Matches: 182
- Goals: 696 (3.82 per match)
- Top goalscorer: Pahiño (21 goals)
- Biggest home win: Atlético Madrid 8–0 Sabadell
- Biggest away win: Real Gijón 2–7 Atlético Madrid
- Highest scoring: Real Gijón 2–7 Atlético Madrid
- Longest winning run: 5 matches Atlético Bilbao
- Longest unbeaten run: 8 matches Barcelona; Valencia
- Longest winless run: 6 matches Real Gijón
- Longest losing run: 4 matches Español; Alcoyano; Sabadell; Real Sociedad

The 1947–48 La Liga was the 17th season since its establishment. Barcelona achieved their third title.

From this season on, the relegation play-offs were eliminated and the bottom two at the end of the season were relegated.

== Team locations ==
Location of teams in 1947–48 La Liga

Real Madrid played the first half of the season at Estadio Metropolitano, until the opening of the Nuevo Estadio de Chamartín.

| Club | City | Stadium |
|---|---|---|
| Alcoyano | Alcoy | El Collaro |
| Atlético Bilbao | Bilbao | San Mamés |
| Atlético Madrid | Madrid | Metropolitano |
| Barcelona | Barcelona | Les Corts |
| Celta | Vigo | Balaídos |
| Gimnástico | Tarragona | Avenida de Cataluña |
| Español | Barcelona | Sarriá |
| Oviedo | Oviedo | Buenavista |
| Real Gijón | Gijón | El Molinón |
| Real Madrid | Madrid | Chamartín |
| Real Sociedad | San Sebastián | Atotxa |
| Sabadell | Sabadell | Cruz Alta |
| Sevilla | Seville | Nervión |
| Valencia | Valencia | Mestalla |

== League table ==
| Pos | Team | Pld | W | D | L | GF | GA | GD | Pts | Relegation |
|---|---|---|---|---|---|---|---|---|---|---|
| 1 | Barcelona (C) | 26 | 15 | 7 | 4 | 65 | 31 | +34 | 37 | |
| 2 | Valencia | 26 | 15 | 4 | 7 | 59 | 34 | +25 | 34 | |
| 3 | Atlético Madrid | 26 | 13 | 7 | 6 | 73 | 45 | +28 | 33 | |
| 4 | Celta | 26 | 14 | 3 | 9 | 59 | 48 | +11 | 31 | |
| 5 | Sevilla | 26 | 12 | 5 | 9 | 50 | 40 | +10 | 29 | |
| 6 | Atlético Bilbao | 26 | 12 | 4 | 10 | 56 | 44 | +12 | 28 | |
| 7 | Gimnástico | 26 | 10 | 4 | 12 | 49 | 55 | −6 | 24 (Note: Gimnástico finished ahead of Español on overall goal difference.) | |
| 8 | Español | 26 | 9 | 6 | 11 | 39 | 47 | −8 | 24 | |
| 9 | Oviedo | 26 | 9 | 5 | 12 | 49 | 57 | −8 | 23 | |
| 10 | Alcoyano | 26 | 9 | 4 | 13 | 40 | 52 | −12 | 22 | |
| 11 | Real Madrid | 26 | 7 | 7 | 12 | 41 | 56 | −15 | 21 (Note: Real Madrid finished ahead of Sabadell on head-to-head points: Sabadell–Real Madrid 1–1, Real Madrid–Sabadell 4–0.) | |
| 12 | Sabadell | 26 | 9 | 3 | 14 | 41 | 62 | −21 | 21 | |
| 13 | Real Sociedad (R) | 26 | 8 | 3 | 15 | 38 | 56 | −18 | 19 | Relegated to the Segunda División |
| 14 | Real Gijón (R) | 26 | 7 | 4 | 15 | 37 | 69 | −32 | 18 | Relegated to the Segunda División |

Source: BDFútbol
Rules for classification: 1) points; 2) head-to-head points; 3) head-to-head goal difference; 4) goal difference; 5) number of goals scored.
(C) Champions; (R) Relegated

== Results ==
| Home \ Away | ALC | ATB | ATM | BAR | CEL | ESP | GIM | OVI | RGI | RMA | RSO | SAB | SEV | VAL |
|---|---|---|---|---|---|---|---|---|---|---|---|---|---|---|
| Alcoyano | — | 0–4 | 1–0 | 0–2 | 2–0 | 1–0 | 2–1 | 3–1 | 6–1 | 2–1 | 3–1 | 3–0 | 1–1 | 0–2 |
| Atlético Bilbao | 6–1 | — | 0–1 | 3–2 | 5–0 | 1–2 | 7–0 | 5–1 | 0–0 | 3–0 | 1–3 | 3–1 | 2–2 | 2–1 |
| Atlético Madrid | 3–2 | 1–1 | — | 2–2 | 3–1 | 5–2 | 5–2 | 4–0 | 5–3 | 5–0 | 4–3 | 8–0 | 5–3 | 2–2 |
| Barcelona | 3–0 | 3–0 | 2–1 | — | 1–1 | 5–1 | 1–1 | 2–1 | 4–0 | 4–2 | 6–0 | 2–1 | 6–0 | 1–1 |
| Celta | 2–0 | 5–1 | 4–1 | 3–2 | — | 4–0 | 5–0 | 4–2 | 3–2 | 4–1 | 2–0 | 1–1 | 1–1 | 5–2 |
| Español | 2–2 | 1–0 | 2–2 | 2–1 | 2–1 | — | 1–0 | 3–1 | 5–1 | 2–0 | 2–0 | 2–3 | 0–1 | 1–3 |
| Gimnástico | 4–3 | 7–1 | 2–1 | 1–2 | 2–2 | 1–0 | — | 3–0 | 5–0 | 3–3 | 2–0 | 0–1 | 2–0 | 1–0 |
| Oviedo | 4–3 | 2–2 | 2–2 | 2–2 | 1–2 | 0–0 | 6–2 | — | 0–0 | 7–1 | 3–0 | 4–2 | 4–0 | 1–0 |
| Real Gijón | 1–1 | 1–2 | 2–7 | 1–4 | 3–1 | 1–1 | 3–2 | 2–1 | — | 2–0 | 4–1 | 1–2 | 3–1 | 1–4 |
| Real Madrid | 2–2 | 5–1 | 1–1 | 1–1 | 1–4 | 3–1 | 1–3 | 2–0 | 0–1 | — | 3–0 | 4–0 | 2–1 | 1–1 |
| Real Sociedad | 5–0 | 0–3 | 3–1 | 0–0 | 4–1 | 4–2 | 3–1 | 1–2 | 3–2 | 1–1 | — | 3–0 | 0–0 | 0–2 |
| Sabadell | 3–2 | 0–2 | 1–2 | 2–4 | 2–0 | 3–3 | 2–2 | 1–2 | 5–0 | 1–1 | 4–2 | — | 3–1 | 3–2 |
| Sevilla | 2–0 | 2–1 | 1–1 | 4–0 | 3–1 | 3–1 | 3–1 | 5–1 | 3–1 | 2–3 | 5–0 | 3–0 | — | 3–0 |
| Valencia | 1–0 | 3–0 | 3–1 | 1–3 | 7–1 | 1–1 | 3–1 | 6–1 | 3–1 | 4–2 | 2–1 | 4–1 | 1–0 | — |

Source: BDFútbol
Legend: Blue = home team win; Yellow = draw; Red = away team win.

== Top scorers ==
| Rank | Player | Team | Goals |
|---|---|---|---|
| 1 | (Spain) Pahiño | Celta | 21 |
| 2 | (Spain) Francisco Peralta | Gimnástico | 20 |
| 3 | (Spain) Antonio Vidal Caturla | Atlético Madrid | 19 |
| 3 | (Spain) César Rodríguez | Barcelona | 19 |
| 5 | (Spain) José Luis Panizo | Atlético Bilbao | 18 |
| 6 | (Spain) Esteban Echevarría | Oviedo | 16 |
| 6 | (Spain) Juan Araujo | Sevilla | 16 |
| 8 | (Spain) Silvestre Igoa | Valencia | 15 |
| 9 | (Spain) José Juncosa | Atlético Madrid | 14 |
| 9 | (Spain) Hermidita | Celta | 14 |
