= Atlético Tetuán =

Spanish football club

- Full name: Club Atlético Tetuán
- Founded: 1933
- Dissolved: 1956
- Ground: Estadio de Varela
- Capacity: 15,000
Home colours	Away colours

Club Atlético Tetuán was a Spanish football club based in Tétouan, Spanish protectorate of Morocco. The club played a single season in La Liga in 1951–52, after winning the Segunda División Southern Zone in 1950–51. This ended in relegation after finishing last of 16 teams.

Following Morocco's independence in 1956 the club's directors decided to merge the club with local club Sociedad Deportiva Ceuta (1932–1956), becoming Club Atlético de Ceuta and eventually merging into AD Ceuta. The club inherited Atlético Tetuán's federative rights in Spain. AD Ceuta dissolved in 2012.

== Honours ==
- North Africa Championship:
  - Winners (2): 1935–36, 1942–43
- Copa del Rey:
  - Qualified (1): 1936
- Segunda División
  - Winners (1): 1950–51

== Seasons ==
Season	Tier	Division	Place	Copa del Rey
1933–34	5	2ª Reg.		
1934–35	4	1ª Reg.		
1935–36	4	1ª Reg.	1st	2nd round
1941–42	4	1ª Reg.	1st	
1942–43	4	1ª Reg.	1st	1st round
1943–44	3	3ª	5th	2nd round
1944–45	3	3ª	10th	
1945–46	4	1ª Reg.	1st	
1946–47	3	3ª	4th	

Season	Tier	Division	Place	Copa del Rey
1947–48	3	3ª	8th	4th round
1948–49	3	3ª	1st	1st round
1949–50	2	2ª	5th	1st round
1950–51	2	2ª	1st	Quarter-finals
1951–52	1	1ª	16th	
1952–53	2	2ª	3rd	1st round
1953–54	2	2ª	7th	
1954–55	2	2ª	2nd	
1955–56	2	2ª	4th	

- 1 season in La Liga
- 6 seasons in Segunda División
- 5 seasons in Tercera División

== See also ==
- AD Ceuta
