= Antonio Vidal (footballer) =

Spanish footballer

Antonio Vidal Caturla (25 March 1923 – 19 April 1999) was a Spanish footballer who played as a forward.

Born in Alcoy, Alicante, he made his debut for Hércules CF on 1 March 1942 aged 18. In 1946, he moved to his hometown club, CD Alcoyano. The next year, he joined Atlético Madrid for 450,000 pesetas, where he played up front in the Delantera de la Seda alongside José Juncosa, Alfonso Silva, Paco Campos and Adrián Escudero. He later suffered pulmonary problems, and retired in November 1948. In 1952, he returned to football with Jumilla CF. In 1963, he managed the club Hispania in Almería.

He gained his only international cap on 21 March 1948 in a 2–0 friendly win over Portugal at the Santiago Bernabéu Stadium in Madrid, as an Atlético Madrid player.
