= 1951–52 La Liga =

21st season of La Liga

Primera División
- Season: 1951–52
- Champions: Barcelona (5th title)
- Relegated: Las Palmas; Atlético Tetuán
- Latin Cup: Barcelona
- Matches: 240
- Goals: 987 (4.11 per match)
- Top goalscorer: Pahiño (28 goals)
- Biggest home win: Atlético Bilbao 10–1 Zaragoza; Barcelona 9–0 Real Gijón
- Biggest away win: Zaragoza 0–5 Atlético Madrid
- Highest scoring: Zaragoza 5–6 Español; Atlético Bilbao 10–1 Zaragoza
- Longest winning run: 8 matches Barcelona
- Longest unbeaten run: 13 matches Real Madrid
- Longest winless run: 8 matches Real Santander
- Longest losing run: 6 matches Real Santander

The 1951–52 La Liga was the 21st season since its establishment. The season started on 9 September 1951 and finished on 13 April 1952. Barcelona achieved their fifth title.

== Team locations ==
Location of teams in 1951–52 La Liga
Location of teams in 1951–52 La Liga (Canary Islands)

Las Palmas and Atlético Tetuán made their debut in La Liga. The former became the first team from the Canary Islands to play in the top tier while the latter, as Tetouan were part of the Spanish protectorate in Morocco, were the first team based in the continental Africa to play in a European top division.

Club	City	Stadium
Atlético Bilbao	Bilbao	San Mamés
Atlético Madrid	Madrid	Metropolitano
Atlético Tetuán	Tetuán	Varela
Barcelona	Barcelona	Les Corts
Celta	Vigo	Balaídos
Deportivo La Coruña	A Coruña	Riazor
Español	Barcelona	Sarriá
Las Palmas	Las Palmas	Insular
Real Gijón	Gijón	El Molinón
Real Madrid	Madrid	Chamartín
Real Santander	Santander	El Sardinero
Real Sociedad	San Sebastián	Atotxa
Sevilla	Seville	Nervión
Valencia	Valencia	Mestalla
Valladolid	Valladolid	José Zorrilla
Zaragoza	Zaragoza	Torrero

== League table ==
Pos	Team	Pld	W	D	L	GF	GA	GD	Pts	Qualification or relegation
1	Barcelona (C)	30	19	5	6	92	43	+49	43	Qualification for the Latin Cup
2	Atlético Bilbao	30	17	6	7	78	46	+32	40	
3	Real Madrid	30	16	6	8	79	50	+29	38	
4	Atlético Madrid	30	16	5	9	80	57	+23	37	
5	Valencia	30	15	5	10	68	51	+17	35	
6	Sevilla	30	14	4	12	69	57	+12	32	
7	Español	30	14	4	12	69	62	+7	32	
8	Valladolid	30	9	11	10	47	43	+4	29	
9	Celta Vigo	30	12	3	15	64	66	−2	27	
10	Real Sociedad	30	11	4	15	60	59	+1	26	
11	Deportivo La Coruña	30	10	5	15	46	70	−24	25	
12	Zaragoza	30	10	5	15	54	73	−19	25	
13	Real Gijón (O)	30	10	5	15	49	75	−26	25	Qualification for the relegation group
14	Real Santander (O)	30	9	7	14	45	65	−20	25	Qualification for the relegation group
15	Las Palmas (R)	30	9	4	17	36	85	−49	22	Relegation to the Segunda División
16	Atlético Tetuán (R)	30	7	5	18	51	85	−34	19	Relegation to the Segunda División

Source: BDFútbol
Rules for classification: 1) Points; 2) Head-to-head results; 3) Goal difference; 4) Number of goals scored
(C) Champions; (O) Play-off winners; (R) Relegated

== Results ==
Home \ Away	ATB	ATM	TET	BAR	CEL	DEP	ESP	LPA	RGI	RMA	RSA	RSO	SEV	VAL	VAD	ZAR
Atlético Bilbao	—	7–3	3–1	0–3	4–2	4–1	2–1	7–0	4–2	1–1	0–1	4–1	2–0	2–0	1–0	10–1
Atlético Madrid	1–2	—	8–0	1–1	2–1	3–1	3–3	4–0	7–3	3–2	7–2	3–1	2–1	4–0	1–1	2–1
Atlético Tetuán	1–2	4–1	—	2–5	2–1	2–0	3–3	2–2	3–1	3–3	5–1	3–1	3–4	1–1	2–2	0–1
Barcelona	1–0	5–2	3–2	—	6–1	6–1	2–0	7–0	9–0	4–2	7–1	3–1	5–3	1–3	0–0	4–1
Celta	4–1	0–3	7–0	1–2	—	6–1	3–3	5–2	4–1	3–2	3–0	3–1	2–0	1–1	2–1	4–1
Deportivo La Coruña	3–1	1–3	2–3	1–1	3–0	—	3–1	3–1	4–1	1–1	2–1	2–1	1–1	3–2	1–1	2–1
Español	3–3	3–1	4–1	1–0	0–2	3–1	—	2–0	3–0	4–3	4–1	4–1	4–3	2–3	3–0	4–0
Las Palmas	1–1	1–3	4–1	0–2	2–1	3–2	1–0	—	2–0	1–4	1–1	1–0	1–0	5–3	1–1	4–2
Real Gijón	1–1	0–2	3–1	3–2	1–1	0–2	3–1	4–1	—	2–3	3–2	2–1	4–0	2–0	1–1	2–2
Real Madrid	2–2	2–1	4–2	5–1	4–1	3–2	6–1	5–1	5–1	—	2–0	0–0	5–2	3–1	2–0	2–1
Real Santander	3–1	2–2	4–0	0–3	3–0	3–1	1–0	4–0	1–2	0–3	—	2–4	3–1	2–1	2–2	2–2
Real Sociedad	1–4	6–1	1–0	4–2	4–1	7–1	3–0	3–0	1–2	3–1	1–1	—	3–3	1–2	3–1	2–0
Sevilla	2–0	3–1	3–2	3–0	3–1	2–0	3–2	5–0	3–3	4–1	5–0	2–2	—	6–1	4–1	2–1
Valencia	2–3	3–0	5–1	2–2	7–2	3–0	4–1	3–0	3–0	2–1	1–1	4–0	2–0	—	3–0	2–2
Valladolid	2–2	1–1	3–0	1–1	3–0	5–0	1–3	4–1	4–1	2–1	1–1	4–1	2–1	1–2	—	1–0
Zaragoza	2–4	0–5	3–1	2–4	3–2	1–1	5–6	6–0	2–1	1–1	1–0	3–2	3–0	4–2	2–1	—

Source: BDFútbol
Legend: Blue = home team win; Yellow = draw; Red = away team win.

== Relegation group ==
=== Standings ===
Pos	Team	Pld	W	D	L	GF	GA	GD	Pts	Qualification
1	Mestalla (Note: Mestalla was ineligible for promotion, as they were the reserve team of Valencia.) (O)	10	5	4	1	27	10	+17	14	Qualification to Segunda División
2	Real Gijón (O)	10	5	3	2	20	14	+6	13	Qualification to La Liga
3	Real Santander	10	5	1	4	27	20	+7	11	Qualification to La Liga
4	Alcoyano	10	4	1	5	23	21	+2	9	Qualification to Segunda División
5	Logroñés	10	3	2	5	11	21	−10	8	Qualification to Segunda División
6	Ferrol	10	2	1	7	13	35	−22	5	Qualification to Segunda División

Source: BDFútbol
Rules for classification: 1) Points; 2) Head-to-head results; 3) Goal difference; 4) Number of goals scored
(O) Play-off winners

=== Results ===
Home \ Away	ALC	FER	LOG	MES	RGI	RSA
Alcoyano	—	4–3	7–2	2–2	3–4	4–2
Ferrol	1–0	—	2–0	1–4	1–3	3–7
Logroñés	1–0	1–1	—	1–1	3–2	2–0
Mestalla	2–0	4–0	5–1	—	2–2	6–1
Real Gijón	1–2	2–1	1–0	1–1	—	3–0
Real Santander	3–1	10–0	2–0	1–0	1–1	—

Updated to match(es) played on unknown. Source: BDFútbol
Legend: Blue = home team win; Yellow = draw; Red = away team win.

== Top goalscorers ==
Rank	Player	Club	Goals
1	(Spain) Pahiño	Real Madrid	28
2	(Hungary) László Kubala	Barcelona	26
3	(Spain) César Rodríguez	Barcelona	23
4	(Spain) Hermidita	Celta Vigo	21
5	(Spain) Juan Araujo	Sevilla	20
5	(Spain) Adolfo Atienza	Celta Vigo	18
5	(Spain) Manuel Badenes	Valencia	18
7	(Spain) Roque Olsen	Real Madrid	17
8	(Spain) José Juncosa	Atlético Madrid	16
8	(Spain) Venancio	Atlético Bilbao	16
10	(Spain) José Egea	Español	15
10	(Spain) Luis Molowny	Real Madrid	15
