= Carlos Fenoy =

Argentine footballer (born 1948)

Personal information
- Full name: Carlos Alberto Fenoy Muguerza
- Date of birth: 15 October 1948 (age 78)
- Place of birth: Buenos Aires, Argentina
- Position: Goalkeeper

Senior career*
Years	Team	Apps	(Gls)
1970–1972	Newell's Old Boys	118	(0)
1973–1975	Vélez Sarsfield	116	(0)
1975–1979	Celta	115	(5)
1980–1988	Real Valladolid	252	(1)
- * Club domestic league appearances and goals

Carlos Alberto Fenoy (born 15 October 1948) is an Argentine retired footballer who played as a goalkeeper, primarily in Spain, where he spent ten seasons in La Liga and is considered by Centro de Investigaciones de Historia y Estadística del Fútbol Español as one of the ten best Argentines to play in the league.

== Career ==
Born in Buenos Aires, Fenoy began playing football with local side Newell's Old Boys. He also played for Newell's rivals Club Atlético Vélez Sarsfield before leaving for Spain in 1975.

Fenoy initially joined RC Celta de Vigo, then playing in the Segunda División, and the club was promoted to La Liga for the 1976–77 season. Fenoy had responsibility for taking penalties that season and scored five of six, making him Celta's leading goal-scorer (an unusual feat for a goalkeeper).

Celta suffered relegations in successive seasons, and Fenoy transferred to La Liga's Real Valladolid before the 1980–81 season. He would play eight seasons in La Liga with the club, amassing over 250 league appearances, and becoming one of the oldest ever players in La Liga (aged 39).
