= 1963–64 La Liga =

33rd season of La Liga

Primera División
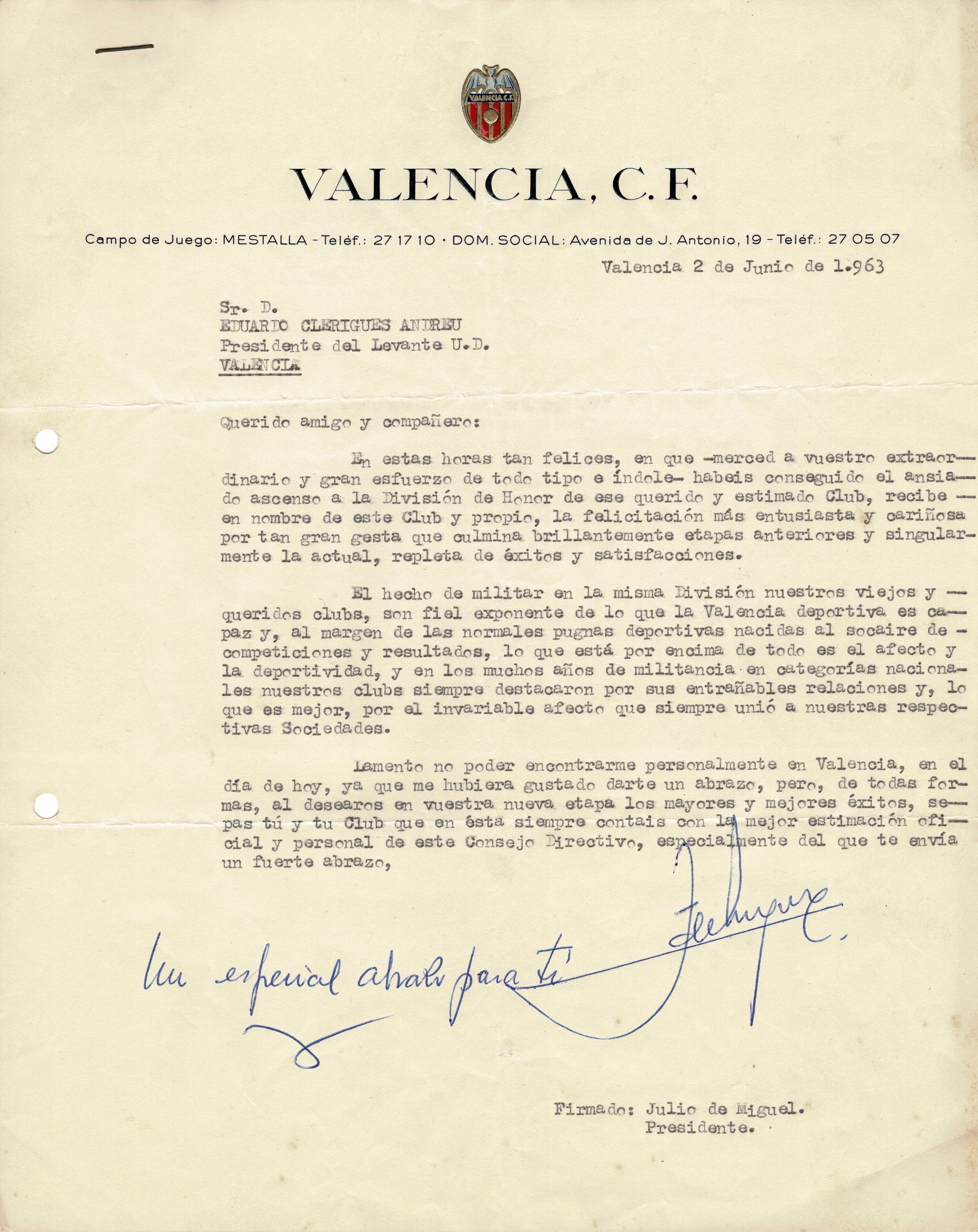
- Document issued by Valencia CF congratulating Levante UD on their first promotion to the top Division.
- Season: 1963–64
- Champions: Real Madrid (10th title)
- Relegated: Pontevedra; Valladolid
- European Cup: Real Madrid
- Cup Winners' Cup: Zaragoza
- Matches: 240
- Goals: 669 (2.79 per match)
- Top goalscorer: Ferenc Puskás (21 goals)
- Biggest home win: Barcelona 6–0 Sevilla; Valencia 6–0 Valladolid
- Biggest away win: Valladolid 0–4 Zaragoza; Murcia 1–5 Barcelona
- Highest scoring: Levante 4–5 Barcelona

The 1963–64 La Liga was the 33rd season since its establishment. The season began on 15 September 1963, and concluded on 26 April 1964.

== Stadia and locations ==
Location of teams in La Liga 1963–64

Team	Home city	Stadium
Atlético Bilbao	Bilbao	San Mamés
Atlético Madrid	Madrid	Metropolitano
Barcelona	Barcelona	Nou Camp
Córdoba	Córdoba	El Arcángel
Elche	Elche	Altabix
Español	Barcelona	Sarrià
Levante	Valencia	Vallejo
Murcia	Murcia	La Condomina
Oviedo	Oviedo	Carlos Tartiere
Pontevedra	Pontevedra	Pasarón
Real Betis	Seville	Benito Villamarín
Real Madrid	Madrid	Santiago Bernabéu
Sevilla	Seville	Ramón Sánchez Pizjuán
Valencia	Valencia	Mestalla
Valladolid	Valladolid	José Zorrilla
Zaragoza	Zaragoza	La Romareda

== League table ==
Pos	Team	Pld	W	D	L	GF	GA	GD	Pts	Qualification or relegation
1	Real Madrid (C)	30	22	2	6	61	23	+38	46	Qualification for the European Cup preliminary round
2	Barcelona	30	19	4	7	74	38	+36	42	Invited for the Inter-Cities Fairs Cup
3	Real Betis	30	15	7	8	47	36	+11	37	Invited for the Inter-Cities Fairs Cup
4	Zaragoza	30	14	6	10	52	42	+10	34	Qualification for the Cup Winners' Cup first round (Note: Zaragoza qualified to the Cup Winners' Cup as champions of the Copa del Generalísimo.)
5	Elche	30	13	7	10	35	31	+4	33	
6	Valencia	30	16	0	14	53	47	+6	32	Invited for the Inter-Cities Fairs Cup
7	Atlético Madrid	30	10	9	11	37	34	+3	29	Invited for the Inter-Cities Fairs Cup
8	Atlético Bilbao	30	12	5	13	43	40	+3	29	Invited for the Inter-Cities Fairs Cup
9	Sevilla	30	9	11	10	33	38	−5	29	
10	Levante	30	10	7	13	43	56	−13	27	
11	Córdoba	30	10	6	14	32	38	−6	26	
12	Murcia	30	11	4	15	41	54	−13	26	
13	Español (O)	30	10	5	15	34	47	−13	25	Qualification for the relegation play-offs
14	Oviedo (O)	30	10	5	15	27	42	−15	25	Qualification for the relegation play-offs
15	Pontevedra (R)	30	8	5	17	30	45	−15	21	Relegation to the Segunda División
16	Valladolid (R)	30	7	5	18	27	58	−31	19	Relegation to the Segunda División

Source: BDFútbol
Rules for classification: 1) Points; 2) Head-to-head results; 3) Goal difference; 4) Number of goals scored
(C) Champions; (O) Play-off winners; (R) Relegated

== Results ==
Home \ Away	ATB	ATM	BAR	COR	ELC	ESP	LEV	MGA	MUR	OVI	BET	RMA	SEV	VAL	VAD	ZAR
Atlético Bilbao	—	0–0	2–0	2–0	3–2	5–2	0–0	3–1	1–1	0–1	1–2	2–3	3–0	3–1	4–0	1–0
Atlético Madrid	2–0	—	1–0	5–1	1–1	2–0	4–0	3–2	2–1	0–1	0–0	0–1	1–1	0–1	3–1	0–2
Barcelona	2–1	3–1	—	3–1	3–0	5–0	6–2	3–1	4–1	2–1	4–1	1–2	6–0	4–0	2–1	3–3
Córdoba	2–0	1–1	0–2	—	2–0	3–0	4–0	1–0	2–1	2–1	1–0	0–1	2–0	1–0	0–0	0–1
Elche	1–2	2–0	0–0	2–1	—	1–0	2–2	2–0	3–1	2–1	1–1	2–0	2–1	2–1	2–0	1–0
Español	4–0	0–0	2–2	2–0	1–0	—	4–4	0–0	2–1	3–0	1–1	1–0	1–0	2–1	2–0	3–0
Levante	2–1	2–1	4–5	1–0	0–1	3–1	—	3–1	3–0	3–0	0–1	0–1	1–1	1–0	1–0	1–1
Pontevedra	2–0	0–1	0–2	2–1	0–1	3–1	1–1	—	2–1	4–1	2–0	1–0	0–0	0–1	1–2	1–1
Murcia	2–0	2–1	1–5	1–1	2–2	1–0	1–0	2–1	—	1–0	2–3	0–3	3–1	2–0	2–1	2–0
Oviedo	2–1	1–1	2–1	1–1	1–0	2–1	2–0	0–0	0–1	—	1–1	0–2	1–0	1–4	2–1	2–0
Real Betis	1–1	4–2	2–3	1–0	0–0	4–0	3–0	3–0	3–1	1–0	—	1–0	3–1	2–0	2–0	2–1
Real Madrid	3–1	5–1	4–0	5–2	1–0	1–0	3–0	3–1	4–1	1–0	1–1	—	1–1	2–0	2–1	3–1
Sevilla	1–2	0–0	1–1	1–1	1–0	2–0	2–0	3–0	2–2	1–1	3–1	1–0	—	3–0	2–0	1–0
Valencia	2–1	2–1	0–2	1–0	1–0	2–1	5–3	3–1	3–2	3–0	4–0	1–4	4–1	—	6–0	4–0
Valladolid	1–1	0–3	2–0	0–0	2–2	2–0	1–2	0–1	2–1	2–1	3–2	0–3	2–2	3–2	—	0–4
Zaragoza	0–2	0–0	2–0	4–2	3–1	2–0	4–4	3–2	3–2	3–1	3–1	3–2	0–0	5–1	3–0	—

Source: BDFútbol
Legend: Blue = home team win; Yellow = draw; Red = away team win.

== Relegation play-offs ==
Team 1	Agg.	Team 2	1st leg	2nd leg
Real Gijón	1–3	Español	1–0	0–3
Oviedo	4–2	Hércules	4–1	0–1

== Pichichi Trophy ==
Rank	Player	Club	Goals
1	(Spain) Ferenc Puskás	Real Madrid	21
2	(Brazil) Waldo	Valencia	18
3	(Spain) Fernando Ansola	Real Betis	17
3	(Paraguay) Cayetano Ré	Barcelona	17
5	(Spain) Juan Manuel Villa	Zaragoza	13
