= Pahiño =

Spanish footballer (1923–2012)

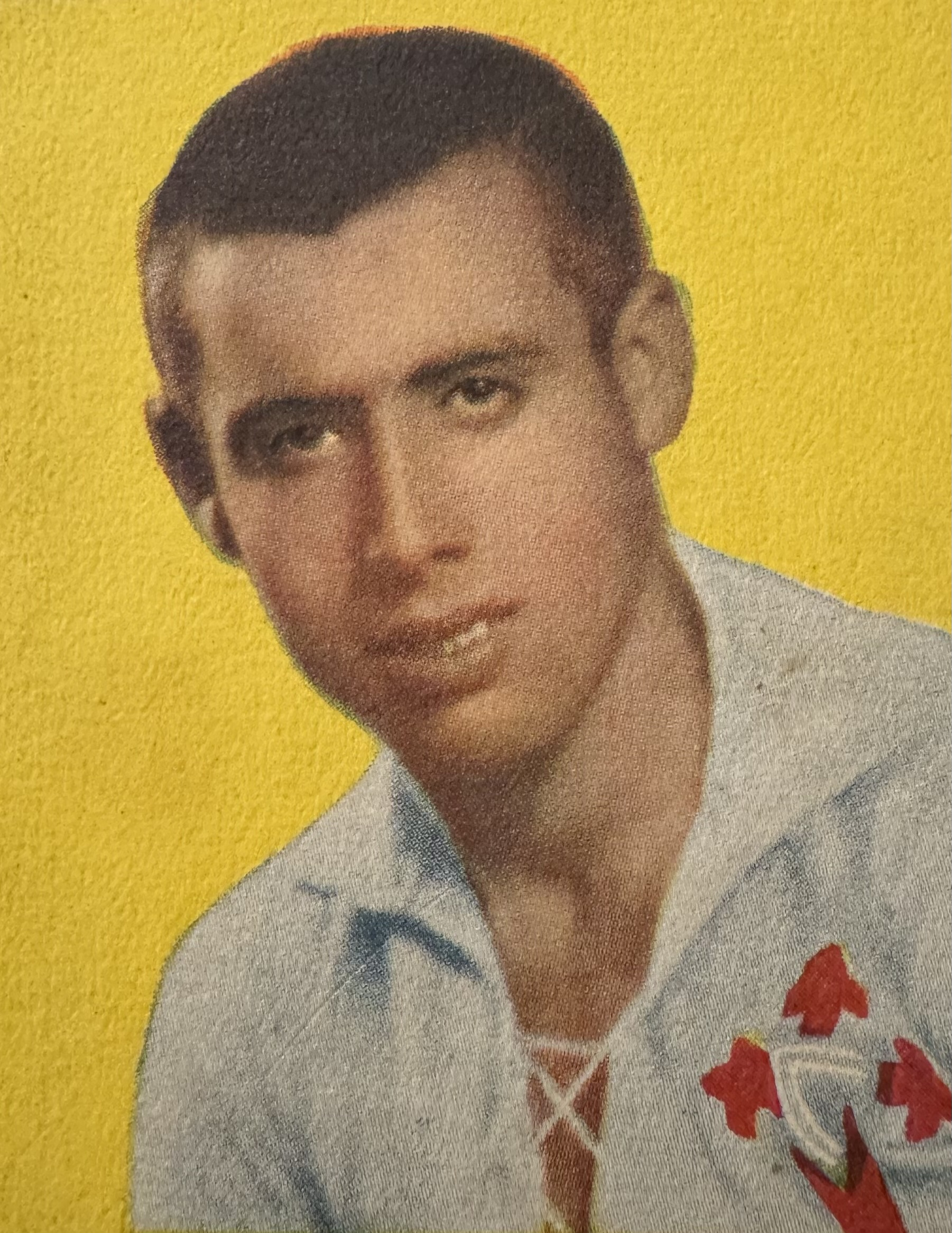

Personal information
- Full name: Manuel Fernández Fernández
- Date of birth: 21 January 1923
- Place of birth: Vigo, Spain
- Date of death: 12 June 2012 (aged 89)
- Place of death: Madrid, Spain
- Position: Striker

Youth career
- 1939–1940: Navia
- 1940–1943: Arenas de Alcabre

Senior career*
Years	Team	Apps	(Gls)
1943–1948	Celta	103	(70)
1948–1953	Real Madrid	124	(109)
1953–1956	Deportivo La Coruña	72	(46)
1956–1957	Granada	15	(8)
Total		314	(233)

International career
1949	Spain B	1	(0)
1948–1955	Spain	3	(3)

Managerial career
- 1956: Deportivo La Coruña
- * Club domestic league appearances and goals

Manuel Fernández Fernández (21 January 1923 – 12 June 2012), known as Pahiño, was a Spanish footballer who played as a striker.

Over 12 seasons, he played 278 games in La Liga, scoring 211 goals for Celta, Real Madrid and Deportivo. He won one Pichichi Trophy each with the first two clubs.

== Club career ==
Born in the neighbourhood of San Paio de Navia in Vigo, Province of Pontevedra, Pahiño joined RC Celta de Vigo in 1943, immediately becoming a starter. He only scored four La Liga goals in his first season (from 15 appearances), being relegated.

After the team's return to the top flight, Pahiño never scored less than 15 times until his departure. In the 1947–48 campaign, his league-best 21 goals helped them finish a best-ever fourth and reach the final of the Copa del Generalísimo.

In summer 1948, both Pahiño and Miguel Muñoz signed for Real Madrid. He continued to find the net at a regular rate for his new club, winning his second Pichichi at the end of 1951–52. However, he lost his importance in the squad following the arrival of Alfredo Di Stéfano, who later admitted his frustration of never having played alongside him; across all competitions, he scored 124 goals in 143 matches, ranking 13th in the all-time scoring list at the time of his death.

Until his retirement in 1957, at the age of 34, Pahiño represented Deportivo de La Coruña (top division, three seasons) and Granada CF (Segunda División). On 30 October 1955, whilst at the service of the former, he scored twice in a 2–1 win over his former employer at the Santiago Bernabéu Stadium.

Over a fortnight in February 1956, Pahiño acted as player-coach for Deportivo. The team conceded 12 goals in three games, which included losses against FC Barcelona (0–7, home) and Deportivo Alavés (2–4).

== International career ==
Pahiño earned three caps for Spain, over seven years. He scored on his debut on 20 June 1948, against Switzerland, adding a brace in his final appearance, a 2–2 draw with the Republic of Ireland in another friendly.

== Style of play ==
An ambidextrous player that excelled in the physical aspects of the game, Pahiño possessed a powerful shot with either foot as well as a tremendous heading ability. In 1945, during a promotion play-offs clash against Granada, he played more than 40 minutes with a broken fibula after a challenge by José Millán, in an eventual 4–1 away win.

== Personal life ==
Pahiño received his nickname after a variation of his father's second surname, Paíño. He was an avid reader of the works of Fyodor Dostoyevsky and Leo Tolstoy.

A half-time incident during the international with Switzerland, in which he sarcastically grinned as the team was being harangued by General Gómez Zamalloa, who was also vocal to the National Sports Delegation, may have led to the small number of appearances for his country. He died in the capital Madrid on 12 June 2012, aged 89.

== Career statistics ==
=== Club ===
Appearances and goals by club, season and competition
Club	Season	League			Copa del Rey		Europe		Total	
Club	Season	Division	Apps	Goals	Apps	Goals	Apps	Goals	Apps	Goals
Celta	1943–44	La Liga	15	4	4	4	–		19	8
Celta	1944–45	Segunda División	21	13	3	4	–		24	17
Celta	1945–46	La Liga	22	15	4	1	–		26	16
Celta	1946–47	La Liga	23	17	7	3	–		30	20
Celta	1947–48	La Liga	22	21	9	9	–		31	30
Celta	Total		103	70	27	21	0	0	130	91
Real Madrid	1948–49	La Liga	26	21	3	0	–		29	21
Real Madrid	1949–50	La Liga	22	20	2	0	–		24	20
Real Madrid	1950–51	La Liga	24	21	2	1	–		26	22
Real Madrid	1951–52	La Liga	27	28	6	7	–		33	35
Real Madrid	1952–53	La Liga	25	19	6	8	–		31	27
Real Madrid	Total		124	109	19	16	0	0	143	125
Deportivo	1953–54	La Liga	28	14	2	0	–		30	14
Deportivo	1954–55	La Liga	22	18	4	3	–		26	21
Deportivo	1955–56	La Liga	22	14	0	0	–		22	14
Deportivo	Total		72	46	6	3	0	0	78	49
Granada	1956–57	Segunda División	15	8	0	0	–		15	8
Career total			314	233	52	40	0	0	366	273

=== International ===
Scores and results list Spain's goal tally first, score column indicates score after each Pahiño goal.

List of international goals scored by Pahiño
No.	Date	Venue	Opponent	Score	Result	Competition
1	20 June 1948	Hardturm, Zürich, Switzerland	Switzerland	1–0	3–3	Friendly
2	27 November 1955	Dalymount Park, Dublin, Republic of Ireland	Republic of Ireland	1–1	2–2	Friendly
3	27 November 1955	Dalymount Park, Dublin, Republic of Ireland	Republic of Ireland	2–1	2–2	Friendly

== Honours ==
Club

Real Madrid

- Small Club World Cup: 1952

Granada

- Segunda División: 1956–57

Individual

- Pichichi Trophy: 1947–48, 1951–52
