= José Egea =

Spanish footballer

Personal information
- Full name: José Egea Gómez
- Date of birth: 25 July 1922
- Place of birth: Barcelona, Spain
- Date of death: 2 October 2012 (aged 90)
- Place of death: Granollers, Spain
- Height: 1.58 m (5 ft 2 in)
- Position: Forward

Senior career*
Years	Team	Apps	(Gls)
1942–1943	Sabadell		
1943–1944	Mallorca		
1944–1948	Sans		
1948–1950	Badalona	45	(19)
1950–1954	Español	80	(36)
1953–1954	→ Sabadell (loan)	17	(4)
1954	Iberia		
1955–1956	Unión Española		(18)
1957–1958	Sans		
1958	Deportes Los Ángeles		
- * Club domestic league appearances and goals

José Egea Gómez (25 July 1922 – 2 October 2012), known as Egea, was a Spanish professional footballer who played as a forward for clubs in his homeland and Chile.

== Career ==
Born in Barcelona, Spain, Egea played for Sabadell, Mallorca, Sans and Badalona and Español. Nicknamed La Rateta (Little Rat) due to his dribbling and speed, he stood out with Español in the Primera División between 1950 and 1953 and was sent on loan to Sabadell in 1953–54.

In March 1954, Egea moved to Chile to play for Iberia in the Chilean Primera División and the next year he switched to Unión Española alongside his countryman and brother-in-law Pedro Caparrós Hospital until 1956, scoring 18 goals. He and Caparrós were nicknamed Los Pepes.

Back to Spain, Egea rejoined Sans for the 1957–58 season. In 1958, he returned to Chile and played for Deportes Los Ángeles from the homonymous city.

== Personal life and death ==
Egea married Concepción Caparrós Hospital, the sister of his fellow footballer, Pedro, and they had two children, Carmen and Mariano José. Mariano José was born in Chile in 1956.

Living in Los Ángeles, Chile, Egea and Caparrós worked at Ventura Torm company as sellers of drinks and cigarettes before opening a bar called "Egea y Caparrós". Later, Egea returned to Spain and died on 2 October 2012, aged 90.
