= Hermidita =

Spanish footballer

Personal information
- Full name: Manuel Hermida Losada
- Date of birth: 27 November 1924
- Place of birth: Gondomar, Spain
- Date of death: 17 September 2005 (aged 80)
- Place of death: Vigo, Spain
- Position: Deep-lying striker

Youth career
- Peñasco
- Berbés

Senior career*
Years	Team	Apps	(Gls)
1944–1956	Celta Vigo	170	(110)
1956–1958	Córdoba CF		
- * Club domestic league appearances and goals

Manuel Hermida Losada (27 November 1924 – 17 September 2005), more commonly known as Hermidita, was a Spanish former footballer who used to play for Celta de Vigo in the 1940s.
