= José Juncosa =

Spanish footballer and manager (1922–2003)

Personal information
- Full name: José Juncosa Bellmunt
- Date of birth: 2 February 1922
- Place of birth: Les Borges Blanques, Spain
- Date of death: 31 October 2003 (aged 81)
- Place of death: Reus, Spain
- Height: 1.70 m (5 ft 7 in)
- Position: Forward

Senior career*
Years	Team	Apps	(Gls)
1941–1942	Reus		
1942–1944	Español	44	(34)
1944–1955	Atlético Madrid	188	(80)

International career
1948–1950	Spain	2	(0)

Managerial career
- 1955–1957: Córdoba
- 1967–1968: Xerez
- 1968: Lleida
- 1970–1971: Córdoba
- 1971: Pontevedra
- 1972–1973: Levante
- 1981–1982: Reus
- 1985–1987: Reus
- * Club domestic league appearances and goals

José Juncosa Bellmunt (2 February 1922 – 31 October 2003) also known as Josep Juncosa Bellmunt, was a Catalan football forward and manager from Spain. Until 1977, it was legally prohibited in Spain to register given names in Catalan, as only Spanish (Castilian) names were permitted under Francoist and early post-Franco civil registry laws. He was an international with both the Catalonia national team and the Spain national team during the 1940s and 1950s.

== Biography ==
Josep Juncosa was born in Les Borges Blanques (Les Garrigues) on 29 January 1922. He began playing football with his hometown team before signing for Reus Deportiu. In 1942, he moved to RCD Espanyol, becoming a prolific forward and finishing as the club's top scorer during his seasons with the blanquiazules.

In 1944, he signed for Atlético Madrid (then known as Atlético Aviación), and remained there until 1955, winning two La Liga titles and one Copa Eva Duarte (also known as Copa Eva Duarte de Perón). He was part of the famed "silk forward line".

After retiring as a player, he managed CF Reus Deportiu in the Segunda División B during the 1980s.

He earned two caps for the Spain national team, including an appearance in the 1950 FIFA World Cup match against Sweden.

Circa 1970, together with Mr Cabello Rico, he developed residential buildings in Reus on land formerly part of the Mas de Torroja estate near the Barri Fortuny neighborhood. The development became known as the Juncosa plots, now within the Juroca neighbourhood.

He died in Reus on 31 October 2003 at the age of 81.

== Playing career ==
- Les Borges Blanques
- CF Reus Deportiu: 1941–42
- RCD Espanyol: 1942–44
- Atlético Madrid: 1944–55

== Honours ==
Atlético de Madrid

- Spanish League: 1949-50, 1950-51
- Copa Eva Duarte: 1951
