= Villacampa =

Villacampa may refer to:

== People ==
- Pascual de Villacampa (1661–1737), Spanish statesman in the service of Charles II and Philip V
- Pedro Villacampa (1776–1854), Spanish military commander
- Manuel Villacampa del Castillo (1827–1889), Spanish military man
- Juan Villacampa (1907–1979), Spanish footballer
- Primitivo Villacampa (1913–1975), Spanish footballer
- Jordi Villacampa (born 1963), Spanish retired professional basketball player
- Ángel Villacampa (born 1976), Spanish footballer

== Places ==
- Villa Campanile, a village in Tuscany in central Italy
- Villa Campanario, a village and municipality in Río Negro Province in Argentina
