= Castelfranco di Sotto =

- Comune
- Comune di Castelfranco di Sotto
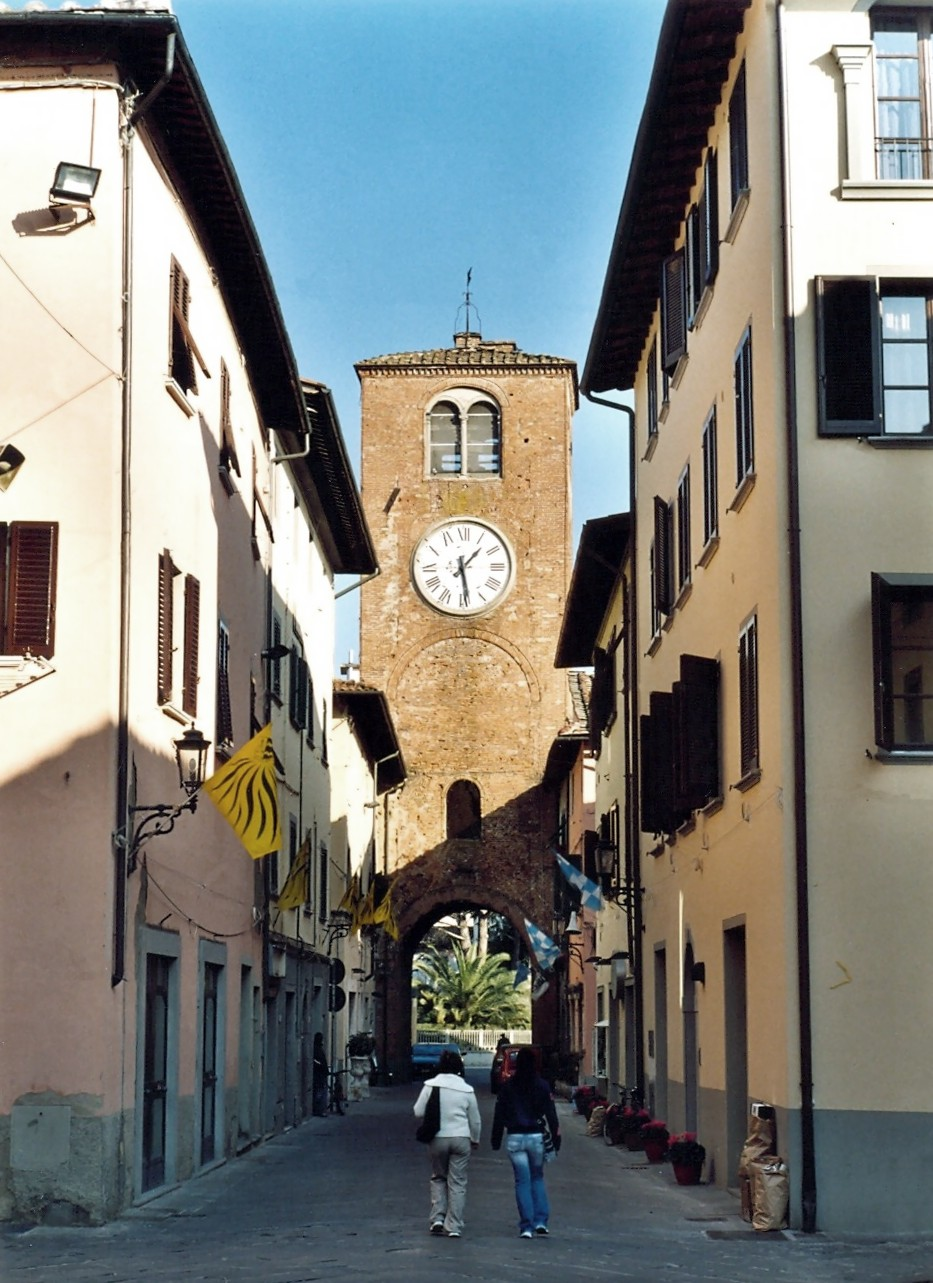
- The bell tower seen from Corso Bertoncini

- Coat of arms

- Location within Italy Location within Tuscany
- Coordinates: 43°42′N 10°45′E
- Country: Italy
- Region: Tuscany
- Province: Pisa (PI)
- Frazioni: Orentano, Villa Campanile, Galleno (partly), Staffoli (partly)

Government
  - Mayor: Fabio Mini

Area
  - Total: 48.4 km^{2} (18.7 sq mi)
- Elevation: 16 m (52 ft)

Population (31 October 2008)
  - Total: 12,179
  - Density: 252/km^{2} (652/sq mi)
- Time zone: UTC+1 (CET)
  - Summer (DST): UTC+2 (CEST)
- Postal code: 56022
- Dialing code: 0571
- Patron saint: San Severo
- Saint day: November 18
- Website: Official website

Castelfranco di Sotto is a comune (municipality) in the Province of Pisa in the Italian region Tuscany, located about 40 kilometres (25 mi) west of Florence and about 30 kilometres (19 mi) east of Pisa.

Castelfranco di Sotto borders the following municipalities: Altopascio, Bientina, Fucecchio, Montopoli in Val d'Arno, San Miniato, Santa Croce sull'Arno, Santa Maria a Monte.

== History ==
Castelfranco is an ancient medieval village, whose name appeared for the first time in 1215. Tired of the battles fought in the area at the time between Florence, Lucca and Pisa, the population of nearby villages Vigesimo, Catiana, Paterno and Carpugnana decided to build here a defensive castle, named Castello di Franco, later changed to Castelfranco.

In 1966 Castelfranco was flooded by the river Arno.

== Culture ==
Every year in Castelfranco the Palio dei Barchini is held.
