= José Arana =

José Arana may refer to:

- José Arana (footballer, 1872–1909), Spanish football midfielder, turned president of Real Sporting Club
- José Arana (footballer, 1902-unknown), Peruvian football midfielder, turned manager
- José Arana (footballer, 1911–1971)), Spanish football defender and Catalonia international
- José Arana, one of the settlers who founded Rancho Potrero y Rincón de San Pedro Regalado
