= Via Aemilia (disambiguation) =

Via Aemilia may refer to three ancient roads:

- Via Aemilia, a major Roman road in North-Eastern Italy
- Via Aemilia Scauri, a Roman road in North-Western Italy
- Via Aemilia in Hirpinis, a Roman road and a branch of the Appian Way in Southern Italy
