= José Arana (footballer, born 1911) =

Spanish footballer (1911–1971)

Personal information
- Full name: José Arana Goróstegui
- Date of birth: 27 April 1911
- Place of birth: Deba, Spain
- Date of death: 29 January 1971 (aged 59)
- Place of death: San Sebastián, Spain
- Position: Defender

Senior career*
Years	Team	Apps	(Gls)
1931–1934	Deportivo Alavés	36	(0)
1934–1935	Barcelona	15	(0)
1935–1936	Osasuna	19	(0)
1937–1938	Girondins de Bordeaux	7	(2)
1938–1939	Excelsior		
1941–1942	Atlético Madrid	2	(0)
1942–1943	Málaga		
1943–1945	Algeciras		
1946–1948	Atlético Tetuán		
1948–1949	España de Tánger		
Total		72	(0)

International career
1935	Catalonia	1	(0)
- * Club domestic league appearances and goals

José Arana Goróstegui (27 April 1911 – 29 January 1971) was a Spanish footballer who played as a Defender for Barcelona, Osasuna, and Atlético Madrid in the 1930s and 1940s.

== Club career ==
Born on 27 April 1911 in the Gipuzkoan town of Deba, (Note: Some sources wrongly state that he was born on 27 April 1912.) Arana began his football career at Deportivo Alavés in 1931, aged 20, with whom he played for three years, until 1934. Both his second and third seasons at the club ended in relegation, but Arana nevertheless was signed by Barcelona, where he played for over a year, from 1934 until 1935. In total, he played 49 matches for Barça, of which 31 were official, including 15 in the La Liga, and the remaining ones in the Catalan championship, being a member of the Barça squad that won the editions of 1934–35 and 1935–36.

Despite starting the 1935–36 season with Barça, Arana soon joined another top-flight team, Osasuna, where he played 19 La Liga matches, but his promising career there was then interrupted by the outbreak of the Spanish Civil War. After a brief stint as a member of the Basque Nationalist Action in the Eusko Indara Group of the Gipuzkoan Militias, Arana left war-torn Spain to go to France, where he briefly played for Girondins de Bordeaux and Excelsior. At the former, he played alongside fellow Spaniards Domingo Torredeflot and Jaime Mancisidor. In 1941, the 30-year-old Arana, returned to Spain, joining top-flight Atlético Madrid (then known as Atlético Aviación), where he was offered little playing time, featuring in only two league matches. In total, he played 72 La Liga matches for Alavés, Barça, Osasuna, and Atlético.

After leaving Atlético, Arana went on to play for Málaga (1942–43) and Algeciras (1943–45), before joining Atlético Tetuán. He then played his last football at España de Tánger, where he retired in 1949, aged 38.

== International career ==
Arana was eligible to play for the Catalan national team, earning his first (and only) cap on 24 September 1935, in a match for the benefit of Mutual Esportiva against Andalusia, coming off the bench to replace Benito Pérez in a 2–0 win.

== Death ==
Arana died in San Sebastián on 29 January 1971, at the age of 63.

== Honours ==
Barcelona

- Catalan championship
  - Champions (2): 1934–35 and 1935–36
