= Falorni =

Falorni is a surname. Notable people with the surname include:

- Manuela Falorni (born 1959), Italian model, pornographic actress and author
- Olivier Falorni (born 1972), French politician

== See also ==
- Falerno
- Falorni, village in Santa Maria a Monte, Italy
