= Josep Torredeflot =

Spanish footballer (1910–1976)

Personal information
- Full name: Josep Torredeflot Solé
- Birth name: Josep Torredeflot i Solé
- Date of birth: 10 October 1910
- Place of birth: Barcelona, Spain
- Date of death: 30 July 1976 (aged 65)
- Place of death: Barcelona, Spain
- Position: Defender

Senior career*
Years	Team	Apps	(Gls)
1926–1927	FC Poble Nou		
1927–1933	Sants		
1933–1937	Girona	21	(0)
1939–1941	Girona	3	(0)
1941–1942	Sants		

International career
1929–1937	Catalonia	9	(0)

Managerial career
- 1935–1936: Girona
- Olot
- * Club domestic league appearances and goals

Josep Torredeflot Solé (10 October 1910 – 30 July 1976), also known as Torredeflot I, was a Spanish footballer who played as a defender for Sants and Girona between 1927 and 1942. He also played five matches for the Catalan national team.

== Playing career ==
=== Club career ===
Born on 10 October 1910 in Catalonian town of Barcelona, Torredeflot began his football career at his hometown club FC Poble Nou in 1926, aged 16, where he coincided with his older brother Domingo, and the two of them then went to Sants in 1927, but while his brother was signed by Valencia the following year, Josep remained at Sants for six years, until 1933, when amidst rumours linking him to Valencia, he instead signed for Girona, then in the Segunda División. Some sources wrongly claim that he was a second division champion with Girona in the 1935–36 season, in which he worked at Girona as a player-coach.

By the time the Spanish Civil War ended in 1939, Torredeflot was still in Girona, remaining there until 1941, when he returned to Sants, where he retired in 1942, at the age of 32. He then moved to Olot, a club he later coached.

=== International career ===
Like so many other Sants players, Torredeflot was eligible to play for the Catalan national team, making his debut against RCD Espanyol in a tribute match to Patricio Caicedo on 17 March 1929, which ended in a 1–5 loss. Four years later, in July 1933, he played two matches against Catalonia, first for a mixed team called Equip Blanc at the Sarrià Stadium on 16 July, in a tribute match to former Espanyol player José Cabo, which ended in a 3–2 loss; and the second for his club Sants at Camp Galileu on 30 July, in a tribute match to Sants' player Frederic Soligó, playing alongside his brother, Ramón Escolà, and Juan Villacampa; Sants won 2–1.

On 14 February 1934, Torredeflot started for Catalonia in a friendly against an unofficial Spanish team at Les Corts, which ended in a 2–0 loss. Four months later, in June 1934, he started for Catalonia in two friendlies against the Brazilian national team, winning the first 2–1, and drawing the latter at two. Two months later, on 15 August, he started alongside his brother in a tribute match to Josep Calvet, helping their side to a 3–0 win over their former club Sants. He earned his last two caps in 1936, one alongside his brother in a 4–0 loss to Valencia on 15 November 1936, and the other in a 4–4 draw against Barça on 16 May 1937.

== Death ==
Torredeflot died in Barcelona on 30 July 1976, at the age of 65.
