= Fucecchio =

- Comune
- Comune di Fucecchio
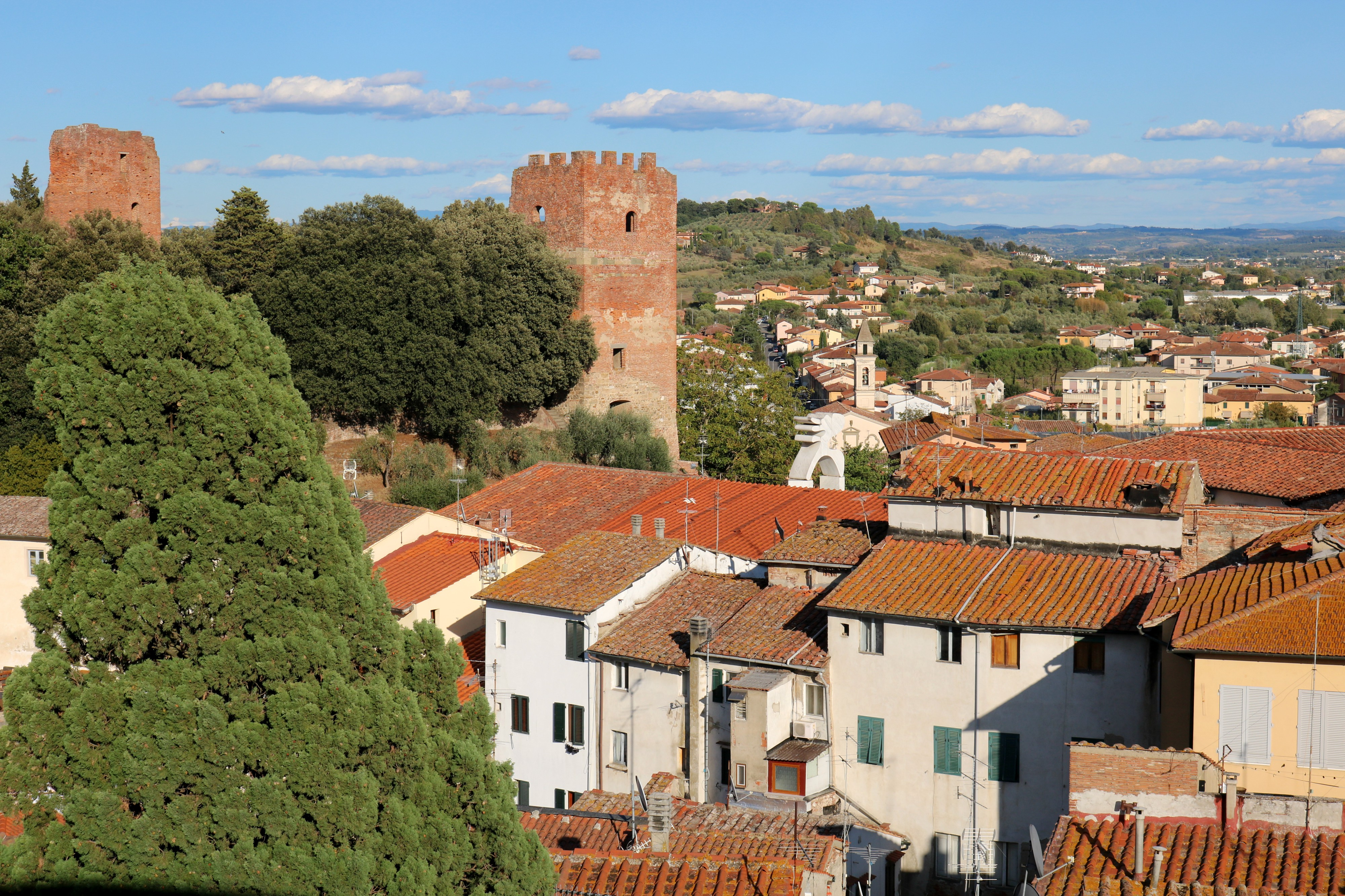

- Coat of arms

- Location within Italy Location within Tuscany
- Coordinates: 43°44′N 10°48′E
- Country: Italy
- Region: Tuscany
- Metropolitan city: Florence (FI)
- Frazioni: Galleno, Le Botteghe, Massarella, Pinete, Ponte a Cappiano, Querce, San Pierino, Torre

Government
  - Mayor: Emma Donnini

Area
  - Total: 65 km^{2} (25 sq mi)
- Elevation: 25 m (82 ft)

Population (31 August 2017)
  - Total: 23,343
  - Density: 360/km^{2} (930/sq mi)
- Demonym: Fucecchiesi
- Time zone: UTC+1 (CET)
  - Summer (DST): UTC+2 (CEST)
- Postal code: 50054
- Dialing code: 0571
- Patron saint: St. Candidus
- Saint day: June 24
- Website: Official website

Fucecchio (Italian pronunciation: [fuˈtʃekkjo]) is a town and comune (municipality) of the Metropolitan City of Florence in the Italian region of Tuscany. The main economical resources of the city are the leather industries, shoes industry and other manufacturing activities, although in the recent years their number has been decreasing because of a slight recession started.

The medieval town of Fucecchio is mentioned frequently in the opera Gianni Schicchi (1917) by Giacomo Puccini – one character, Simone, was once its podestà, and some of the estates to be distributed are situated there.

== Main sights ==
- Collegiata di San Giovanni Battista (11th century, but redone in Neo-Classicist style in the 18th century).
- Abbey of San Salvatore, founded in 1001. It houses a painting by Jacopo Chimenti, derived from a similar one by Giorgio Vasari.
- Oratory of Madonna della Ferruzza.
- Palazzo Corsini.

=== Fucecchio marsh ===
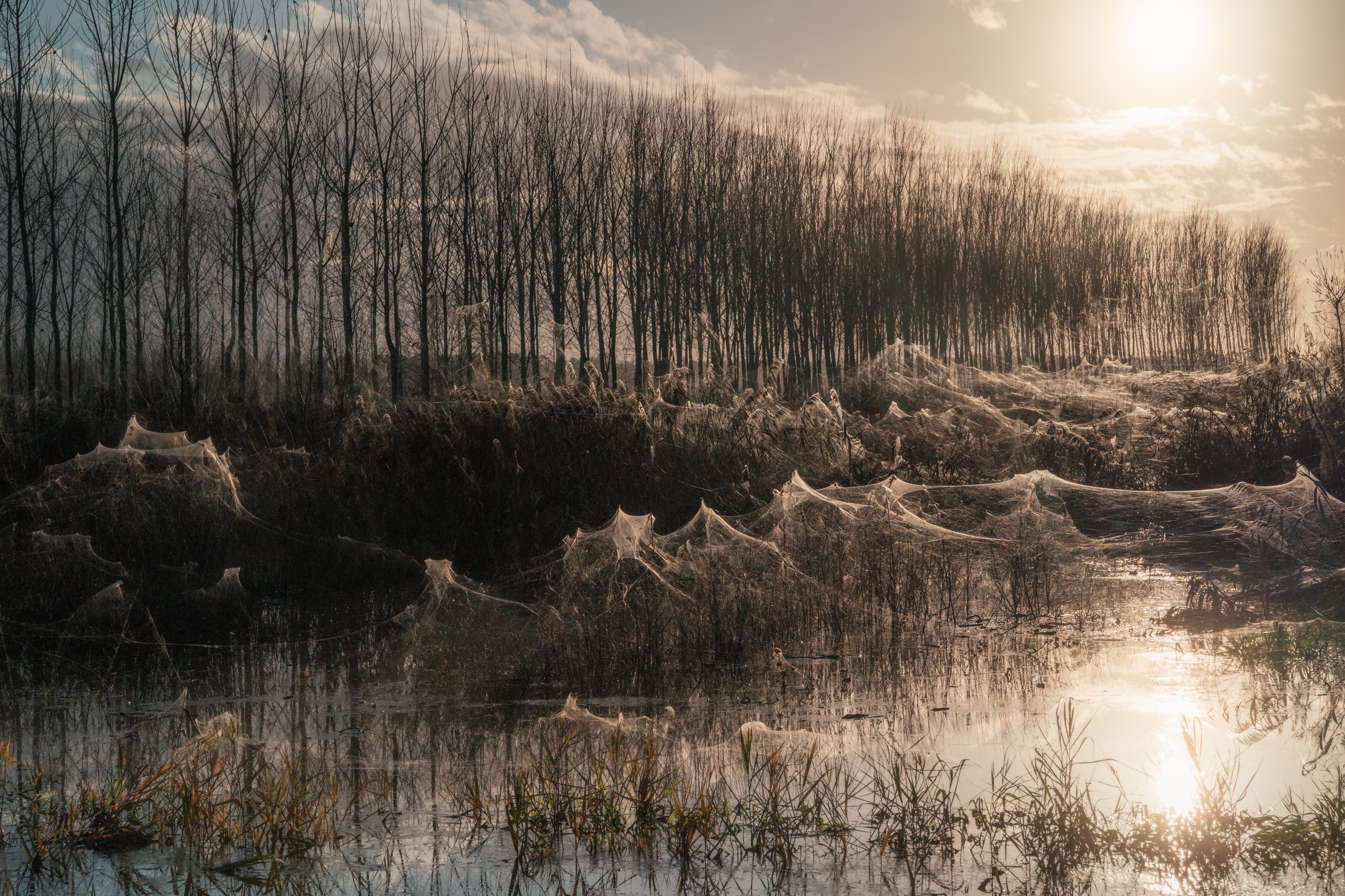
Fucecchio marsh: Nets of cobwebs after prolonged drought followed by heavy rains

The Fucecchio Marsh (1,800 ha) is the largest inland marsh in Italy and is home to over 200 species of birds.

== People ==
People born in Fucecchio include:

- Marco Bracci, volleyball player
- Luca Cecconi, football manager and former striker
- Enrico da Fucecchio, Bishop of Luni
- Manuela Falorni, best known as "la Venere bianca", pornographic actress
- Alessandro Lambruschini, long-distance runner
- Giuseppe Montanelli, writer and politician
- Indro Montanelli, writer and journalist
- Andrea Tafi, cyclist
