= Juan Villacampa =

Spanish footballer (1907–1979)

Personal information
- Full name: Juan Villacampa Presegué
- Birth name: Joan Villacampa i Presegué
- Date of birth: 13 December 1907
- Place of birth: Barcelona, Spain
- Date of death: 15 February 1979 (aged 71)
- Place of death: Spain
- Position: Defender

Senior career*
Years	Team	Apps	(Gls)
1929–1933	UE Sants		
1933–1935	Barcelona		
1935–1939	UE Sants		
1939–1940	Gimnástico		

International career
1934–1935	Catalonia	2	(0)
- * Club domestic league appearances and goals

Juan Villacampa Presegué (13 December 1907 – 15 February 1979) was a Spanish footballer who played as a defender for UE Sants and Barcelona in the 1930s.

== Club career ==
Born on 13 December 1907 in the Catalonian town of Barcelona, Villacampa began his football career at his hometown club UE Sants in 1929, aged 22, with whom he played two seasons in the Tercera División (1929–30 and in 1932–33), both of which ended in relegation. In July 1933, he played two matches against the Catalan national team, first for a mixed team called Equip Blanc at the Sarrià Stadium on 16 July, in a tribute match to former Espanyol player José Cabo, which ended in a 3–2 loss; and the second for his club Sants at Camp Galileu on 30 July, in another tribute match, this time to Sants' player Frederic Soligó, coming off the bench to replace Soligó himself and playing alongside Ramón Escolà and the Torredeflot brothers (Josep and Domingo); Sants won 2–1.

A few weeks later, Villacampa was signed by Barça, making his debut with the first team on 8 December 1933, in a friendly match against a combined XI of Chile and Peru, helping his side to a 4–1 win. The following month, on 7 January 1934, he made his competitive debut for Barça in a La Liga fixture against Real Oviedo, helping his side keep a clean sheet in a 2–0 victory. In total, he played 30 matches for Barça, of which 9 were official, all in the league.

After leaving Barça in 1935, Villacampa returned to Sants, where he played for a further four years, until 1939, when he joined Gimnástico, where he spent the 1939–40 season.

=== International career ===
Like so many other players from Sants and Barça, Villacampa was eligible to play for the Catalan national team, making his debut on 15 August 1934, in a tribute match to Sants player Josep Calvet against his former club Sants, helping his side to a 3–0 win. A few months later, on 1 January 1935, he earned his second and last cap for Catalonia in yet another tribute at the Sarrià, this time to Josep Pausàs, and against Espanyol; it ended in a 3–3 draw.

== Death ==
Villacampa died on 15 February 1979, at the age of 71.
