= Escolà =

Escolà is a Catalan surname. Notable people with the surname include:

- Salvador Escolá Arimany (1854–1905), Spanish painter
- Ramón Escolà (1907–), Spanish footballer
- Josep Escolà (1914–1998), Spanish footballer
- Carlos Blanco Escolá (born 1933), Spanish writer, military historian, and retired cavalry colonel of the Spanish Army
- Carles Escolà Sánchez (born 1978), Spanish politician
