= Luni, Italy =

Luni
- Comune
- Comune di Luni
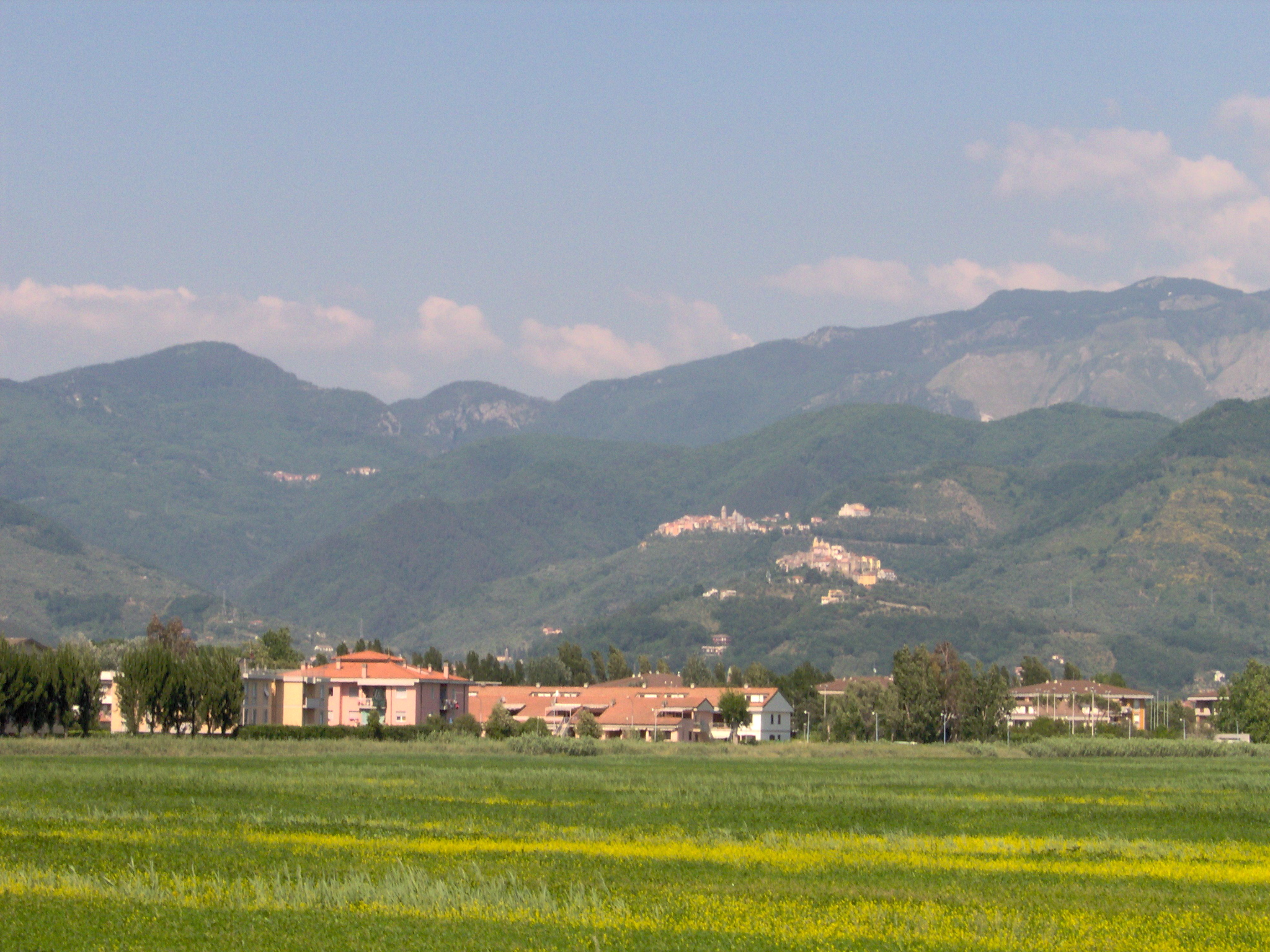
- View of Luni Mare with Ortonovo and Nicola in the background.

- Coat of arms

- Location within Italy Location within Liguria
- Coordinates: 44°05′05.43″N 10°02′31.3″E
- Country: Italy
- Region: Liguria
- Province: La Spezia (SP)
- Frazioni: Annunziata, Caffaggiola, Casano (communal seat), Dogana, Isola, Luni Scavi, Luni Mare, Luni Stazione, Nicola, Ortonovo, Serravalle

Government
  - Mayor: Alessandro Silvestri

Area
  - Total: 13.86 km^{2} (5.35 sq mi)
- Elevation: 76 m (249 ft)

Population (31 December 2015)
  - Total: 8,277
  - Density: 597.2/km^{2} (1,547/sq mi)
- Demonym: Ortonovesi or Lunensi
- Time zone: UTC+1 (CET)
  - Summer (DST): UTC+2 (CEST)
- Postal code: 19034
- Dialing code: 0187
- Patron saint: Madonna del Mirteto
- Saint day: 8 September
- Website: Official website

Luni is a comune (municipality) in the province of La Spezia, in the easternmost end of the Liguria region of northern Italy. It gives its name to Lunigiana, a region spanning eastern Liguria and northern Tuscany (province of Massa-Carrara).

The commune was known as Ortonovo (from the name of one of its current frazioni) until April 2017. It is now named after the frazione of Luni.

Within the municipality is the extensive archaeological area encompassing the impressive remains of the Roman city of Luna.

== Geography ==
Located in a plain near the Tyrrhenian Sea and close to the borders with Tuscany, Luni is crossed by the river Magra and lies between Sarzana (7 km in north) and Carrara (5 km in south). It is 4 km far from Ortonovo, 15 km from Massa and 30 km from La Spezia. The village is served by National Highway 1 "Aurelia", crossed at Luni Mare by the A12 motorway and counts a railway station on the Pisa-Genoa line.

The Roman colony was built on a low promontory at the mouth of the Magra, a position which is now inland but which in ancient times was coastal in every sense: the walls were lapped on one side by the relatively fresh waters of the river estuary on the north-west of the city, and on the other by a salt lagoon, protected from the open sea by a sandy strip and an island as shown by archaeology.

== History ==
=== Background ===
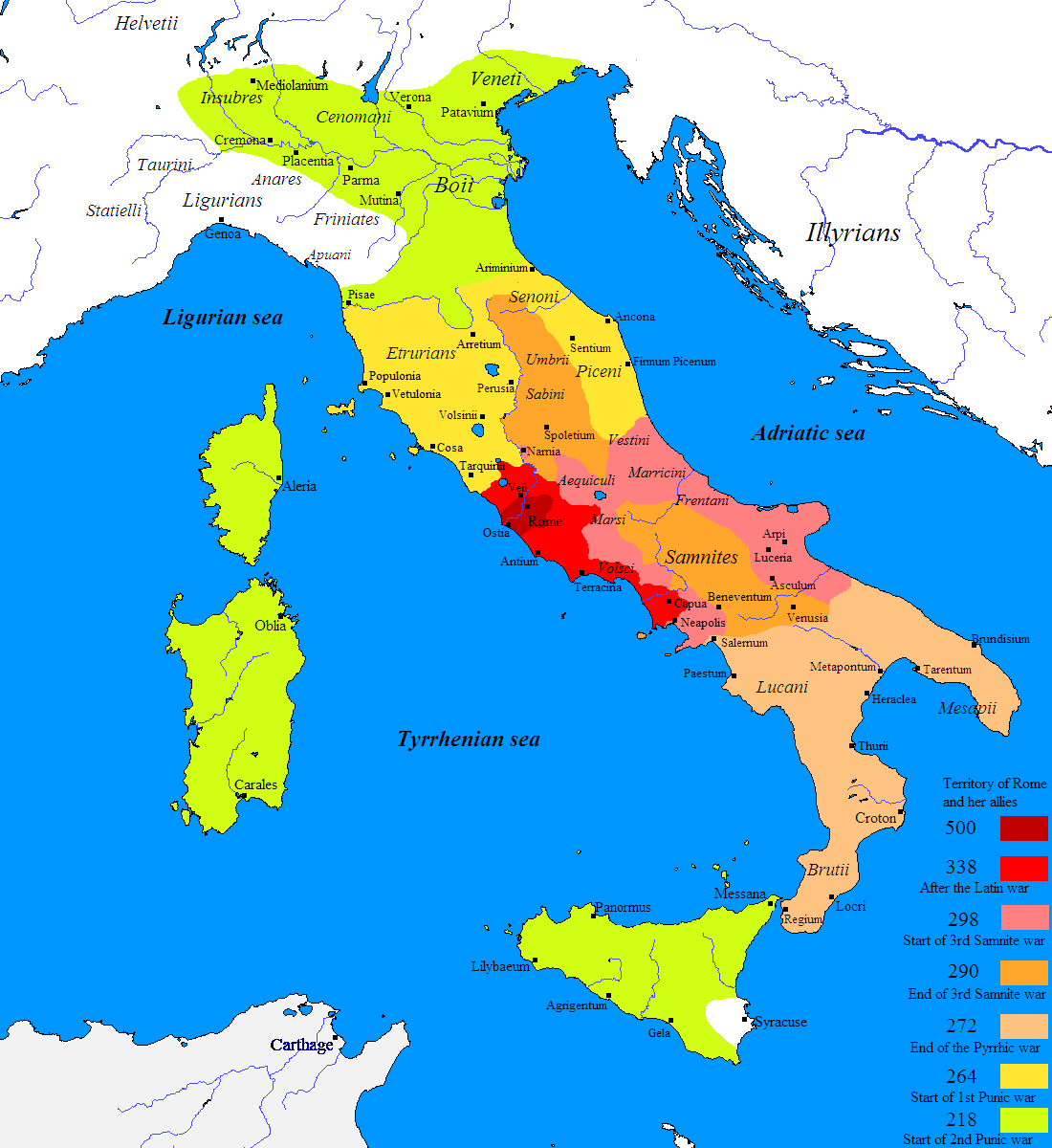
Roman conquest of Italy. Numbers = Years BC

Towards the end of the 3rd century BC the Apuani Ligurians took over the plain of the Lunigiana and the land at the mouth of the river Macra (now Magra), and pressed southward against the territory of the Etruscan city of Pisa which was included within the region fully conquered by the Romans around the middle of the 3rd century BC.

After numerous battles with Rome from the 230s BC, in 193 BC a large Ligurian force attacked Pisa but the consul Quintus Minucius Thermus drove it back.

Liguria was made a Roman consular province by 188 BC with 2 legions stationed there for campaigns. The Apuani were the object of a major offensive in 187 BC by the consuls Gaius Flaminius and Marcus Aemilius Lepidus. Further campaigns followed: in 186 BC the consul Quintus Marcius Philippus was ambushed in Apuani country and lost some 4,000 men and in 185 BC the consul Sempronius forced a passage through to the Magra.

In 180 BC the proconsuls Publius Cornelius Cethegus and Marcus Baebius Tamphilus, whose command in Liguria had been prorogued, received the surrender of about 12,000 Apuani and resettled them on public land in Samnium, judging this the only way to bring the Ligurian war to an end. About 40,000 free persons with women and children were also transferred at public expense.

==== Ancient harbour ====
Luni derived much importance from its harbour, which was on both the Gulf of La Spezia and the estuary of the Magra. The harbour was used as a landing place for commercial ships by both the Etruscans and the Greeks. Nearby a large Ligurian necropolis has been excavated, dating to the 4th and early 3rd century BC, probably attributable to a maritime settlement whose inhabitants had commercial relations with the ships that stopped in the estuary. The harbour is mentioned by Ennius, who sailed from there to Sardinia in 215 BC under Manlius Torquatus. The Romans used the harbour perhaps as early as the end of the 3rd century BC and certainly from the beginning of the 2nd, as a base for the fleets heading to Spain and for the campaigns against the Ligurians. (Note: Livy (A.U.C.) 34.8.4-5, 34.56.1-2, 39.21.1-5, 39.32.1-3)

Recent excavations in the Porta Marina area have found a settlement predating the colony by a few decades.

Under the Romans the port grew to national and not merely local importance.

=== Roman Period ===
Regio VII Etruria

The Roman colony of Luna was established in 177 BC to secure the frontier by the triumviri Publius Aelius Paetus, Marcus Aemilius Lepidus (consul 187 BC) and Gnaeus Sicinius. 2000 Roman citizens were transferred here each being given fifty-one and a half iugera of land taken from the Ligurians. It was named after the goddess Luna (Moon) to whom a temple was built early in the settlement.

Luna was a military stronghold for the campaigns against the Ligures who continued to resist the Romans until 155 BC, when Marcus Claudius Marcellus (consul 166 BC) managed to subdue them definitively; to celebrate the victory his statue was erected in the forum of Luna with an inscription found in 1851. The subsequent resettlement of mountain populations on lower ground combined with the linking of cummunities to cities through attributio drew the survivors into the Roman economy.

In 109 BC Luna was connected to Rome by the Via Aemilia Scauri, rebuilt in the 2nd century AD as the Via Aurelia. Luna flourished from exploitation of the white marble quarries in the nearby Alpi Apuane and neighbouring mountains of Carrara, whose stone bore the name of "Luna marble" in ancient times. Augustus was the first to use Luni marble extensively to beautify Rome. Under the empire of Augustus Luni became part of Regio VII Etruria and experienced its period of maximum splendour, with the expansion of the forum and an intense building expansion.

Pliny the Elder speaks of the quarries as only recently discovered in his day; they were soon owned by the imperial family. He considered the big wheels of cheese from Luna the best in Etruria. Good wine was also produced.

Among the notables of the colony, inscriptions document families such as the Baebii, involved in the exploitation of the quarries, and figures linked to the imperial court such as the eques Lucius Titinius Glaucus Lucretianus, four times duumvir and patron of the colony under Claudius and Nero.

In the 2nd century under the Antonine emperors, the city was further developed, including the large amphitheatre. A further renewal of the city in the Severan age, when the temple of Luna was rebuilt in marble and the quarries and the extraction of marble were re-envigorated. The Monettii family of Luni built the first nucleus of the future village of Moneta, not far from the marble quarries.

In 275 Eutychianus, a citizen of Luni, was elected Pope; he died in 283 and is venerated as a Saint by the Catholic Church.

At the end of the 4th century (after 366) many buildings were abandoned including the Capitoline area, the basilica and the large domus, with collapses and despoliation, perhaps due to an earthquake or a crisis in the marble trade which ceased in this period.

The construction of the first cathedral in the 4th and early 5th century and the building recovery of the 5th century, with the renovation of the domus of the Mosaics contradicts a generalised image of poverty. Rutilius Namatianus, who sailed along the coast in 417, records that Luni was surrounded by "white walls" and was still active:.

=== The Roman city ===
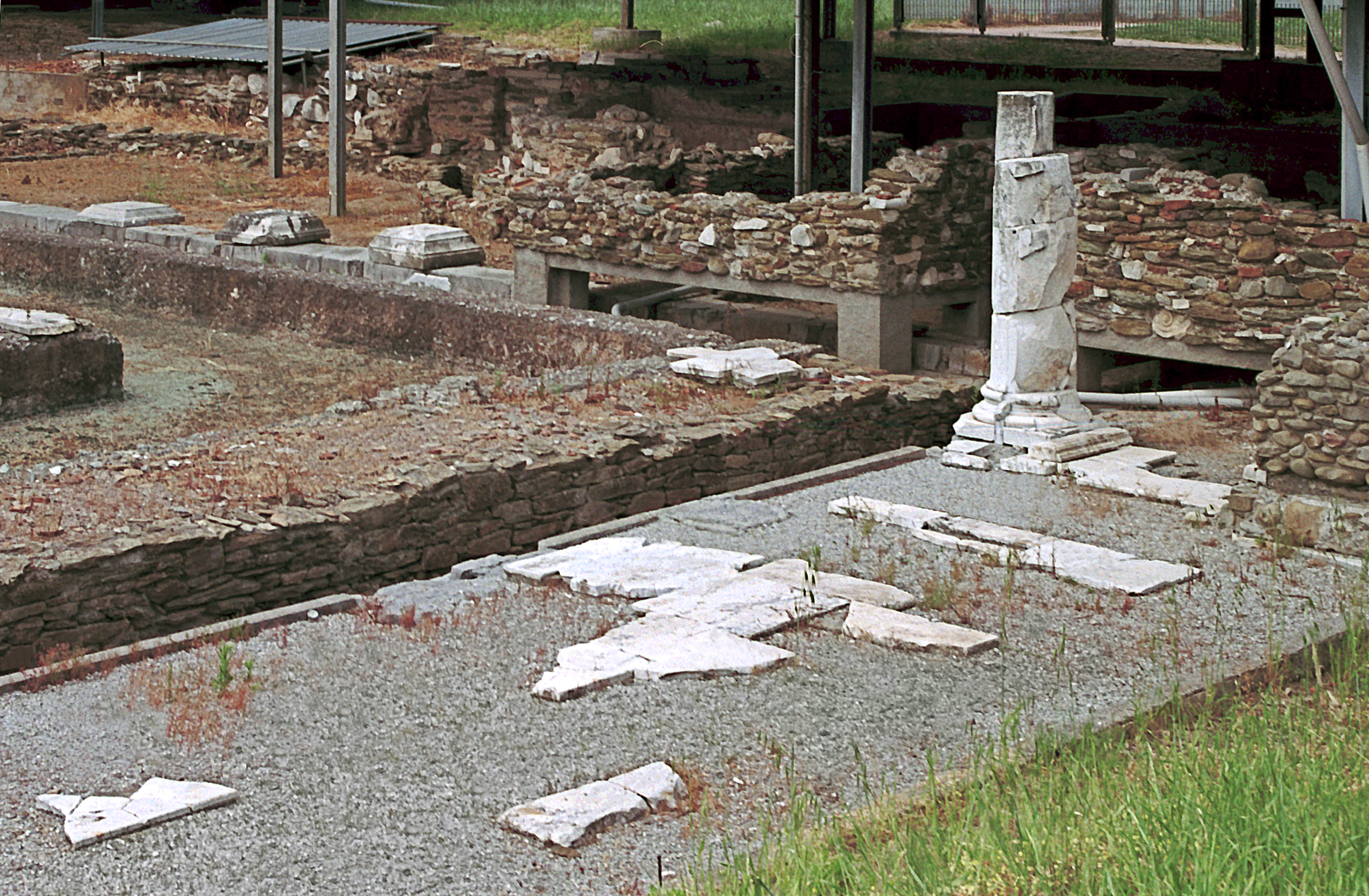
North side of the Forum with Late Antiquity baths

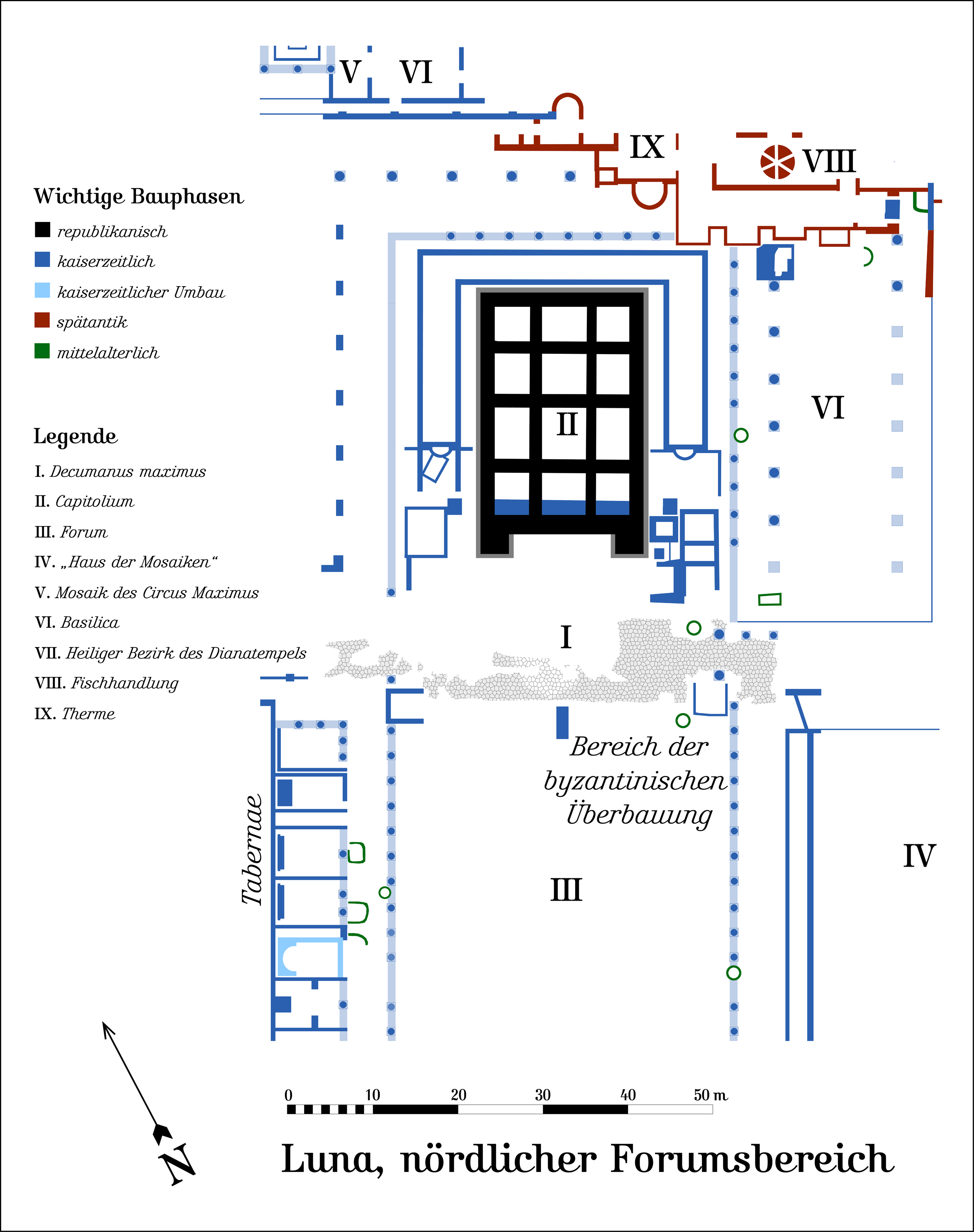
Luna Forum

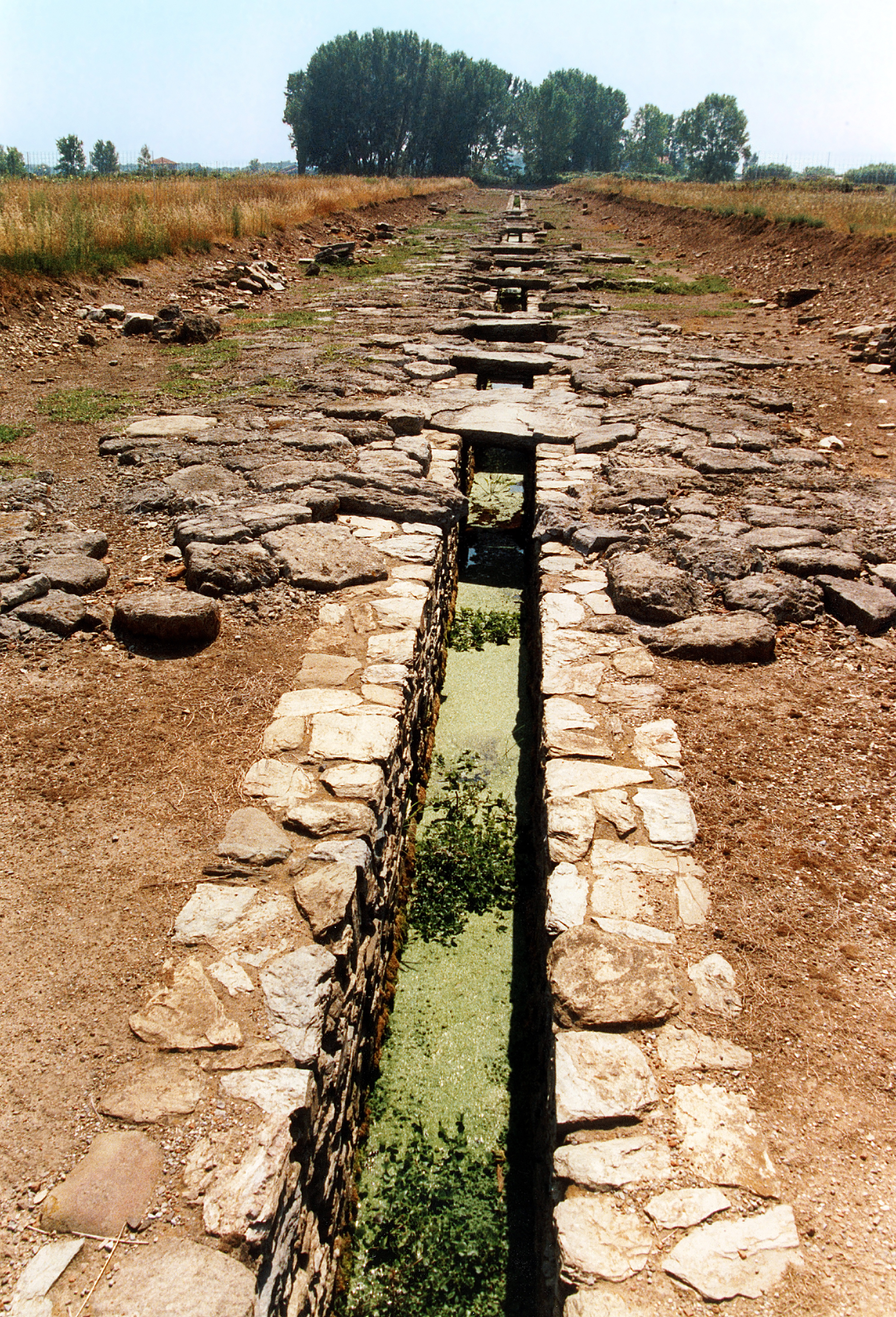
Cardo maximus with main drain

The city walls dating fron the early colony were built with gates on four sides and with a noticeable recess in the south-western corner probably due to the proximity of the lagoon, if not the sea itself. The city was laid out on a rectangular grid with the main artery of the decumanus maximus later becoming part of the Via Aemilia Scauri, the main consular road towards Rome and Gaul. The cardo maximus, perpendicular to it, connected the forum to the port.

Around the forum, measuring 77x37 m and originally paved in marble, were arranged the porticoes with shops, the civil basilica and the curia; the large Republican domus stood on the eastern side of the forum. In Late Antiquity baths and other buildings were constructed on the north side of the forum. The forum seems to have been abandoned as a public space by the end of the 6th century, its buildings fell to ruin or were demolished and decorative marbles removed and later small wooden houses were built there.

The cardo maximus was configured as an extension of the forum area leading to the Porta Marina (harbour gate) and was closed to heavy vehicular traffic. Large rich domus arose along it in the late Republican era with mosaics and second style paintings; in the second half of the 1st century AD one of the two was defunctionalised to make room for a temple on a high podium.

Behind the Capitolium is the Domus of the Mosaics; the Domus of the Frescoes is along a secondary decumanus to the north of the square, the Western Domus.

The Domus of Oceanus named after its beautiful mosaic was built at the end of the 1st century BC near the western wall as a large noble house and consisted of a complex of rooms around a peristyle open to a garden. It was later overbuilt by the cathedral and is still visible as the central and the left naves, as well as to the south of the right nave.

The walls fell out of use in the 1st century AD as shown by buildings against it but in late antiquity, probably within the second half of the 5th century, a reduced circuit was rebuilt around the south-western sector, the so-called Citadel, where the cathedral stood.

The public buildings were completed by the theatre, near the northern corner of the city, and the large amphitheatre of the Antonine age outside the walls.

==== The Luna Temple ====
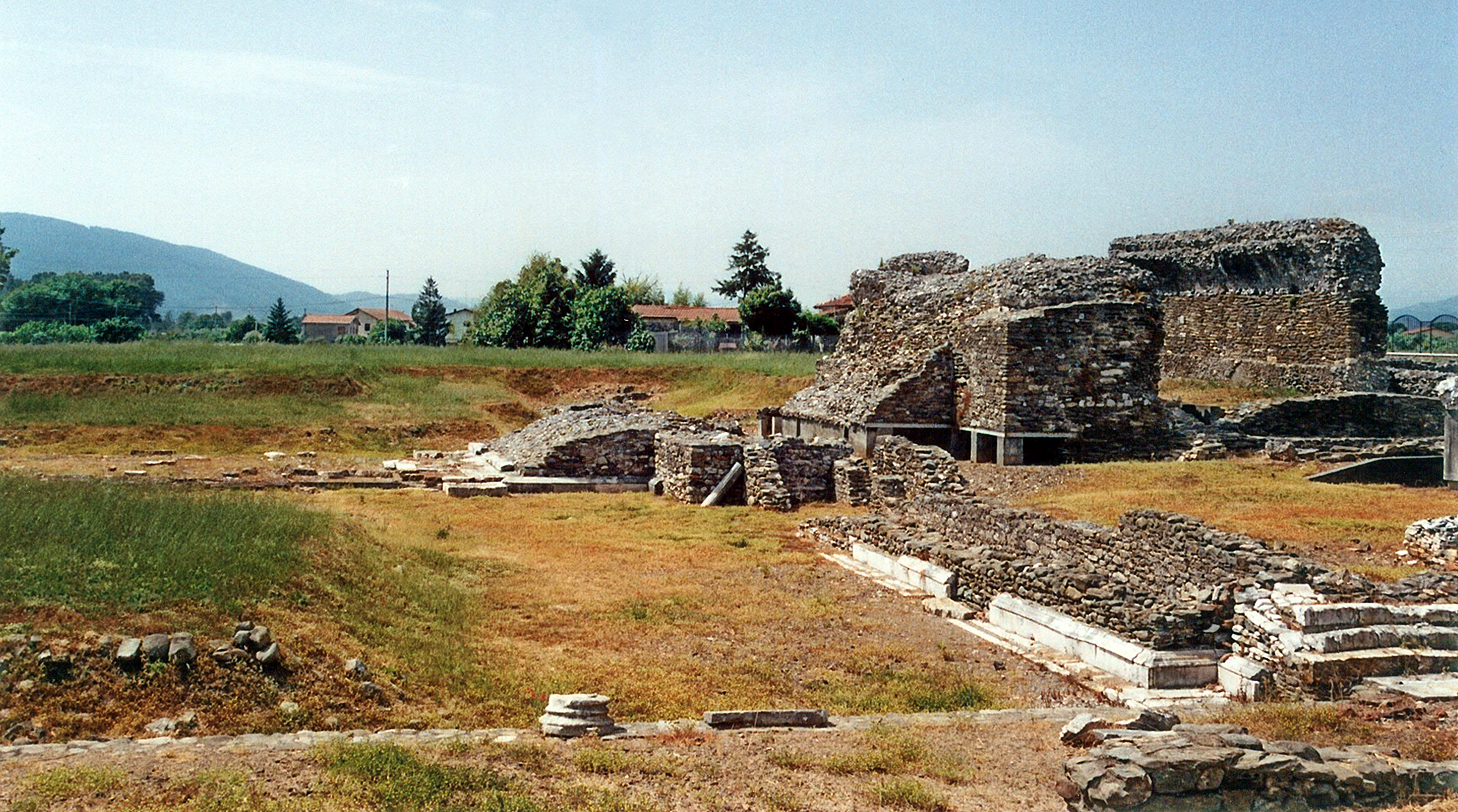
The temple of Luna

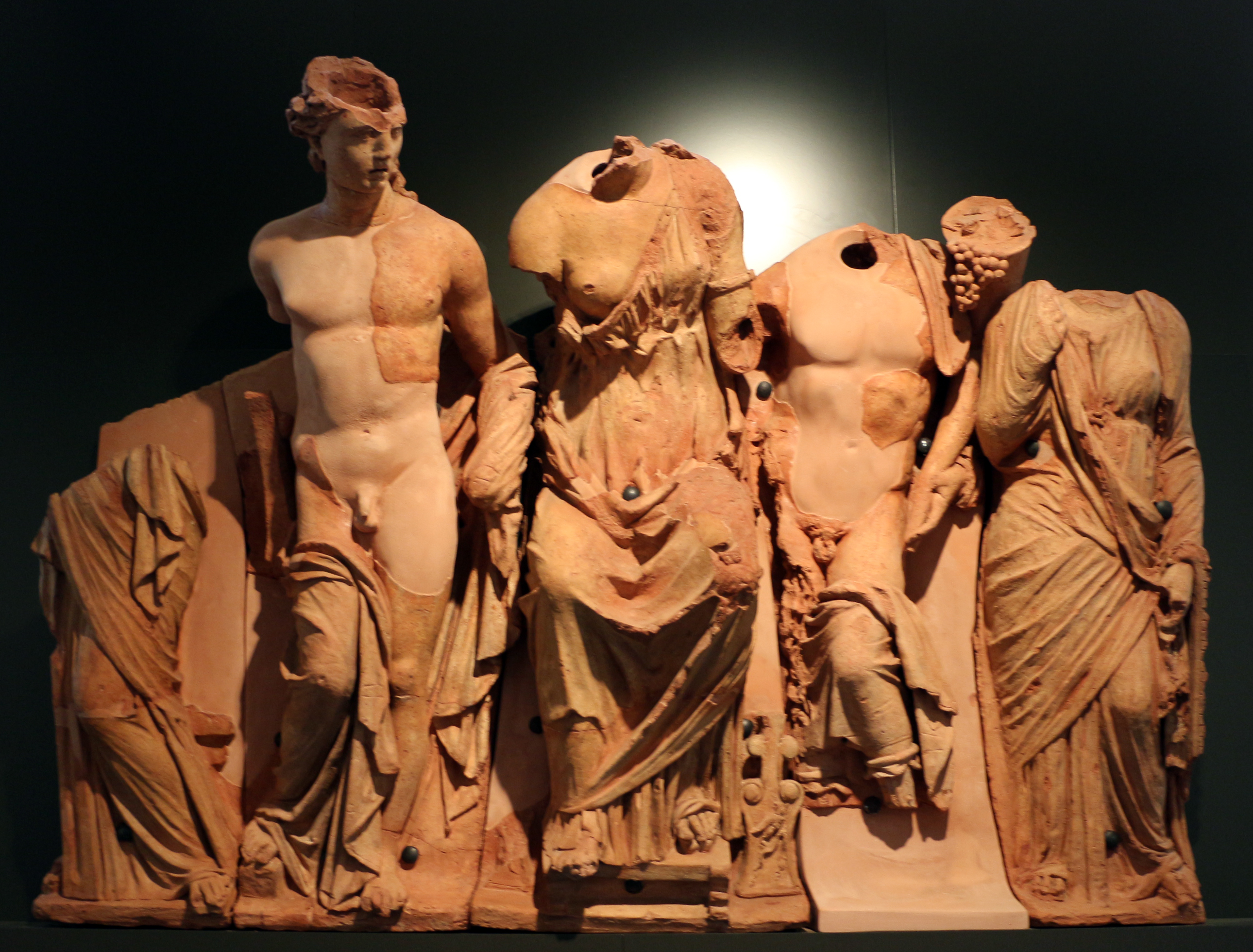
The Council of the Gods; pediment A of the Great Temple (Museo archeologico nazionale di Firenze)

Shortly after the foundation of the colony a temple dedicated to Luna, after whom the city was named, was built on the highest point behind the northern walls. In the first phase, the building (16 x 20.5 m) was probably built according to the Etruscan-Italic model: on a stone podium (base), more than 1 m high, reached by a flight of steps, having an entrance area (pronaos) with four columns in two rows and one or three cellas for the statues of the deities.

The decoration was the famous terracotta pediments of a group of sculptures with the council of the gods depicting Luna, Apollo, Dionysus (or the Genius of the Roman People) and the Muses now in the Archeological Museum of Florence. Under Augustus the temple was covered in marble and a large porticoed square was created in front, as in the forum in Rome. It was also equipped with a triportic with halls paved in opus sectile. A statue with armour was found in the portico, possibly depicting Augustus himself, testifying to the association of his cult after his death with that of Luna.

Around 211 AD, Caracalla carried out a further renovation, commemorated by the inscription engraved on the temple frieze, by building the arches that formed the base on which the temple stood, accessible by an impressive flight of stairs.

==== The Capitolium ====
Amphitheatre of Luni

On the northern monumental side of the forum stood the Capitolium, the oldest building in the colony dating to soon after the colony's foundation. It was a temple dedicated to Jupiter, Juno, and Minerva on a podium measuring 20 by 30.6 m, with a tripartite cella, on polygonal stone walls in a "wasp's nest" fashion, a technique widespread in Republican Capitolia. It was adorned with decorative terracotta tiles and later was surrounded by a portico on three sides.

A reconstruction, probably Augustan, renewed the elevation with quadrangular Ionic bases and capitals and clad it with marble, while twin temples were added to the sides of the façade, perhaps intended for the new imperial cults. Behind the temple, a monumental U-shaped fountain was surrounded by a colonnade with bases of honorary statues in the Augustan-Tiberian era continuing until the Flavian era, as recorded by an inscription from the Vespasian era.

==== The civil basilica ====
On the east side of the capitolium is the basilica in which law was enforced and where commercial trading took place. It was paved in marble. The north section of the basilica was occupied by a domus in the 5th century AD and later the building was used as a burial site shown by the tomb near the entrance.

==== Domus of Frescoes ====
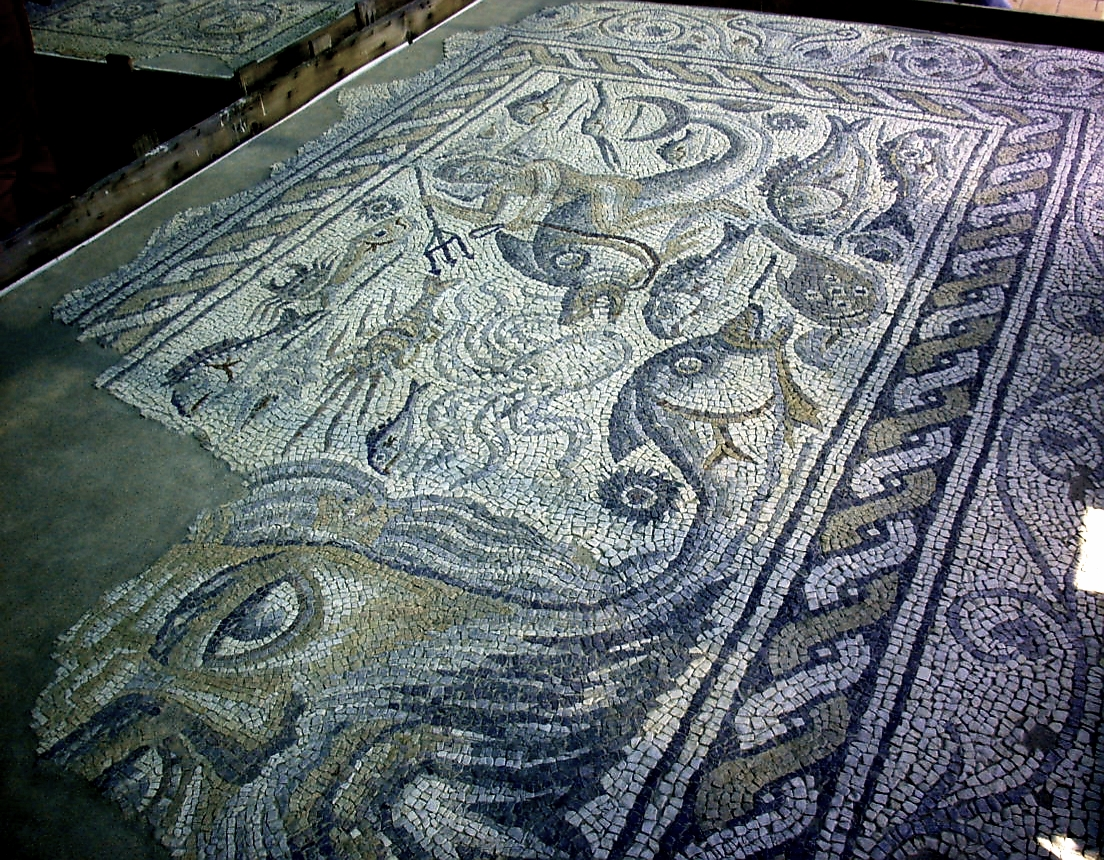
From the Domus of Oceanus

The spectacular Domus of Frescoes, despite its name, is most striking for its gardens covering some 1300 m^{2}. One is "oriental" consisting of four flowerbeds surrounded by small canals into which the spouts of nine fountains emptied. This aristocratic house was built around 70 BC near the Forum. Most of the remains visible today belong to the final renovation from the Claudian-Nerionian period 50-70 AD. Another garden is bordered by a low wall and includes a nymphaeum with fountain covered with shells. These two gardens are enclosed by a windowed portico. The house was abandoned in the mid-4th century and later reused as a cemetery.

The floors of the domus are in expensive opus sectile of rare marble and would have illustrated the owner's wealth and taste. The summer triclinium (dining room) is the most preserved and in a raised position from where the fullest view of the garden could be seen. The arrangement has square tiles alternated with rectangular and triangular ones and the materials are locally sourced grey-blue bardiglio, Giallo antico (Numidian Yellow) from North Africa and red marble strips from Greece. The flooring of the cubiculum (bedroom) in the winter quarters has a motif based on rectangular tiles of bardiglio around a central African marble element, all set apart by thin strips of Numidian Yellow. It does not cover all the room but one end where a wooden or masonry bed frame was probably positioned is left uncovered.

The frescoes of the "Room of the Sphinxes" are named after a small square with a yellow background with Egyptian deities and a Sphinx on a red background all on a refined black background. The Egyptian taste was all the rage in Rome between the Late Republic and Early Empire, stimulated by contacts with the Province of Egypt after Octavian's victory over Antony and Cleopatra at Actium. The decoration of the walls was organised in two parts: the plinth had a red background with white lines that connected yellow and green rectangular panels. The upper part of the wall had a refined composition on a black background with flower garlands, plant candlesticks and pilasters with volute pedestals decorated with leaf shoots; the whole was painted to indicate shading.

==== Porta Marina Area ====
Near the so-called Porta Marina recent excavations have brought to light Building A and Domus B, used from the Republican age to the end of the 7th century. Building A was probably destroyed by an earthquake in the second half of the 4th century AD and then used for a laundry and at the end of the 5th to the end of the 7th c. for wooden houses.

The domus was built 70-50 BC and arranged around a large atrium of 160 m^{2} paved with a black background mosaic floor dotted with white tesserae. Several rooms had high quality mosaic floors. On the south side a shop (taberna) opened onto the Cardo Maximus. A corridor led to the large peristyle garden with a basin in the centre; the architraves of the colonnade were decorated with terracotta tiles with bunches of grapes among vine leaves.

At the end of the entrance corridor, a mosaic depicts an arched building in which prows of ships can be seen, representing a navalia or shipyard. The ships are shown with an extension to the keel, similar to a ram but curved upwards designed to cut through the water and provide stability to the ship, characteristic of large cargo ships. It is possible that the first owner of the domus was a shipowner.

At the end of the 1st century AD a temple was built over the house.

==== The theatre ====
At the end of the 19th century Carlo Fabbricotti partially excavated the theatre and recovered rich architectural elements and sculptures for his private collection. Excavations in the late 1960s by Antonio Frova brought the structure to light and in 2014-2019, conservation has allowed a re-examination of the monument which showed it to be a theatrum tectum, or roofed theatre. Between the late 6th and mid-7th centuries it was used as a residential space predating the Lombard burial ground of its final chapter.

==== The northern domus ====
The northern domus was built in the early imperial age adjacent to the northern city gate, covering previous structures. A garden was surrounded by a peristyle with brick columns on square bases, on a white marble mosaic floor. In the north-west corner of the garden was a large rectangular pool fed by the well and rainwater. The triclinium (dining room) was ample with a floor in coloured marble and walls decorated with delicate floral design on a green background giving a convivial atmosphere. An Etruscan-style atrium surrounded an impluvium for the collection of rain water. The domus was abandoned at the end of the 4th century.

==== House of the Mosaics ====
The domus was built around 50 BC on earlier buildings. It takes its name from the mosaics that were made on site between 290 and 420 AD to which period most visible walls date. A series of rooms surround a porticoed atrium, a portion of the pavement of which can be seen with the figure of Dionysus in the central part and the personifications of the four seasons in the corners. On the north side was a panel depicting a basket of flowers and four birds on top and with a dancing procession along the bottom border. This scene has been interpreted in different ways: as part of a ritual linked to Dionysus with references to the afterlife, or as a wedding party due to the presence of a young woman with a crown of flowers and a flaming torch. In the bedroom (cubiculum) Hercules is depicted killing a wild animal with arrows from his bow. The eastern corridor led to a garden and a large room with a richly decorated mosaic. In the 5th century the east side of the atrium was embellished with a mosaic depicting Rome's Circus Maximus.

=== Middle Ages ===
Captured by the Goths in the early 6th century, Luna was reconquered by the Byzantines in 552, who however lost it to the Lombards in 642. The latter damaged the city's economy, favouring the trades routes that passed through the nearby port of Lucca to the south. Luni had been reduced to a small village by the time of the Lombard king Liutprand. Later, it was a countship and see under Charlemagne, exactly on the border between the Kingdom of Italy and the Papal States.

It was repeatedly sacked by sea pirates, Saracens in 849, and Vikings who settled there in 860. Luna is supposed to have been mistakenly sacked by the Viking leaders Björn Järnsida and Hastein, who thought it was Rome. Hastein tricked his way in by pretending to be a dying Christian convert. The 9th century Bishop Saint Ceccardo, believed to have been martyred by the Vikings, is celebrated on 16 June.

In the mid-10th century it experienced the last period of splendour under count Oberto I, who was lord of the whole Ligurian Mark, and momentarily repulsed the pirate threat. However, in the 990s the situation worsened again, and the episcopal see was moved, first to Carrara then, definitively, to Sarzana in 1207 (or 1204). In 1015 Luna was conquered by the Andalusian emir of Denia, Mujāhid, with his Sardinian ships: When Pisa and Genoa beat back his forces, Luni was left destroyed. The spreading of malaria in the area and the silting up of the port contributed to the steep decline of Luni. In 1058 the whole population moved to Sarzana, while other refugees founded Ortonovo and Nicola. The title of bishop and count of Luni remained in use for various centuries, but Petrarch noted Luni as "once famous and powerful, and now only a naked and useless name".

It was only in 1442 that the highly visible remains were identified with Luni and the Gulf of La Spezia recognized as its harbour. (Note: Bracelli, Giacomo. Descriptio orae ligusticae. cited in Weiss (1969).) The depredation of the Roman ruins of Luni aroused the concern of the local Cardinal Filippo Calandrini, who urged the Humanist pope Pius II to issue a brief (7 April 1461) forbidding any further dilapidations. It was of little practical use: When the Palazzo del Commune of Sarzana was constructed in 1471 dressed stone from Luni supplied a considerable part of the building material. In 1510 the city council of Sarzana made a gift to the French governor at Genoa of a marble triton found at Luni.

== Archaeology ==
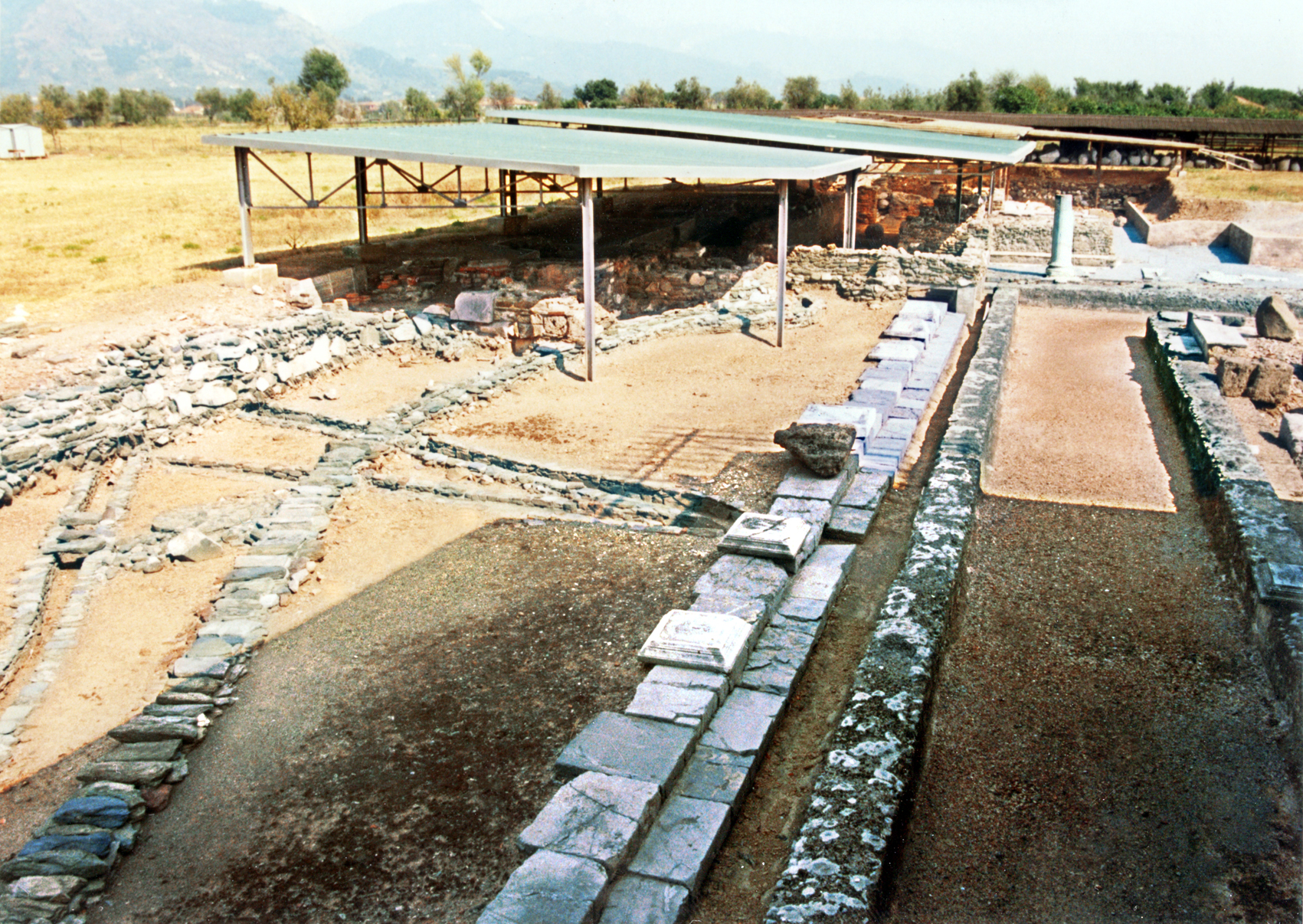
The forum

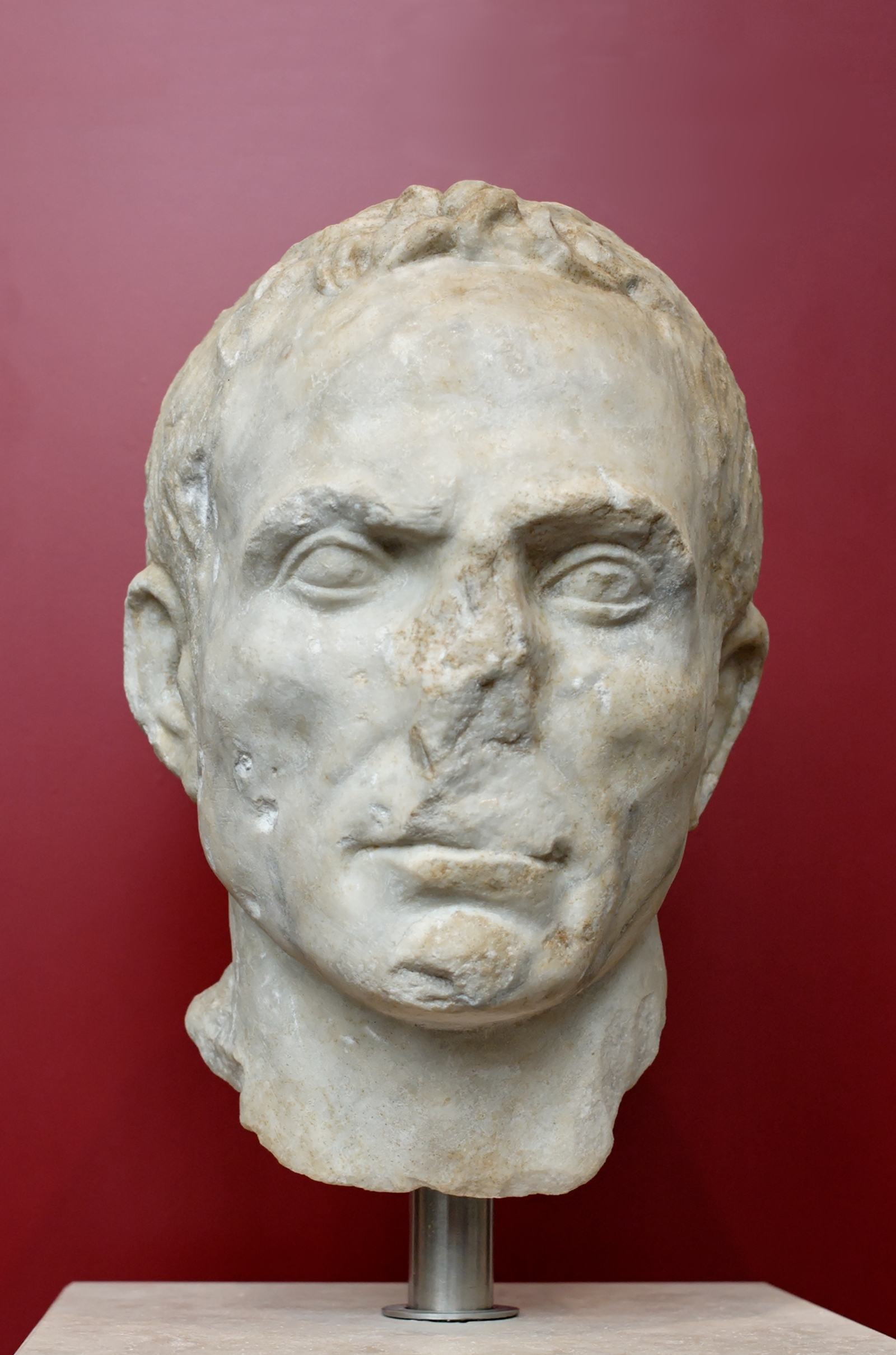
Male portrait. Luni marble, period of the Second Triumvirate (43 BC)

Luni was first excavated in the 1970s and many of the material brought to light is now housed in the adjacent museum on site.

Cuntz's investigations seem to lead to the conclusion that an ancient road crossed the Apennines from it, following the line of the modern road (more or less that of the modern railway from Sarzana to Parma), and dividing near Pontremoli, one branch going to Borgotaro, Veleia and Placentia, and the other over the Cisa pass to Forum Novum (Fornovo) and Parma.

== Main sights ==
- Remains of the elliptical Roman amphitheatre (1st century AD)
- Roman era artifacts are displayed the Luni Archaeological Museum
- Sanctuary of Nostra Signora del Mirteto, at Ortonovo, consecrated in 1566
- Torre di Guinigi, a medieval tower in Ortonovo
- Castle of Volpiglione, located between Castelpoggio and Ortonovo, dating from the 11th-12th centuries.
- Castle of Nicola (13th-15th century)
- 19th century municipal building, at Casano

== Sources ==
- Balbo, Mattia (2021). "Contare i Ligures: il contesto del trasferimento degli Apuani nel Sannio". In Giorcelli Bersani, Silvia; Venturino, Marica (eds.). I Liguri e Roma. Un popolo tra archeologia e storia. Studi e Ricerche sulla Gallia Cisalpina 29. Rome: Edizioni Quasar. pp. 169–181. ISBN 978-88-5491-172-7.
- Barigazzi, Adelmo (1991). "Liguri Friniati e Apuani in Livio". Prometheus. 17: 55–74. doi:10.36253/prometheus-15435.
- Bourdin, Stéphane (2012). Les peuples de l'Italie préromaine : identités, territoires et relations inter-ethniques en Italie centrale et septentrionale (VIIIe–Ier s. av. J.-C.). Bibliothèque des Écoles françaises d'Athènes et de Rome. Vol. 350. Rome: École française de Rome. ISBN 978-2-7283-0907-8.
- Dyson, Stephen L. (1985). "The Development of the Ligurian Frontier". The Creation of the Roman Frontier. Princeton: Princeton University Press. pp. 87–124.
- This article incorporates text from a publication now in the public domain: Ashby, Thomas (1911). "Luna". In Chisholm, Hugh (ed.). Encyclopædia Britannica. Vol. 17 (11th ed.). Cambridge University Press. p. 123. That, in turn, cites Dennis, G. (1883). Cities and Cemeteries of Etruria. London, UK: John Murray. ii. 63. (T. As.).
