= Galleno, Tuscany =

Galleno
- Frazione
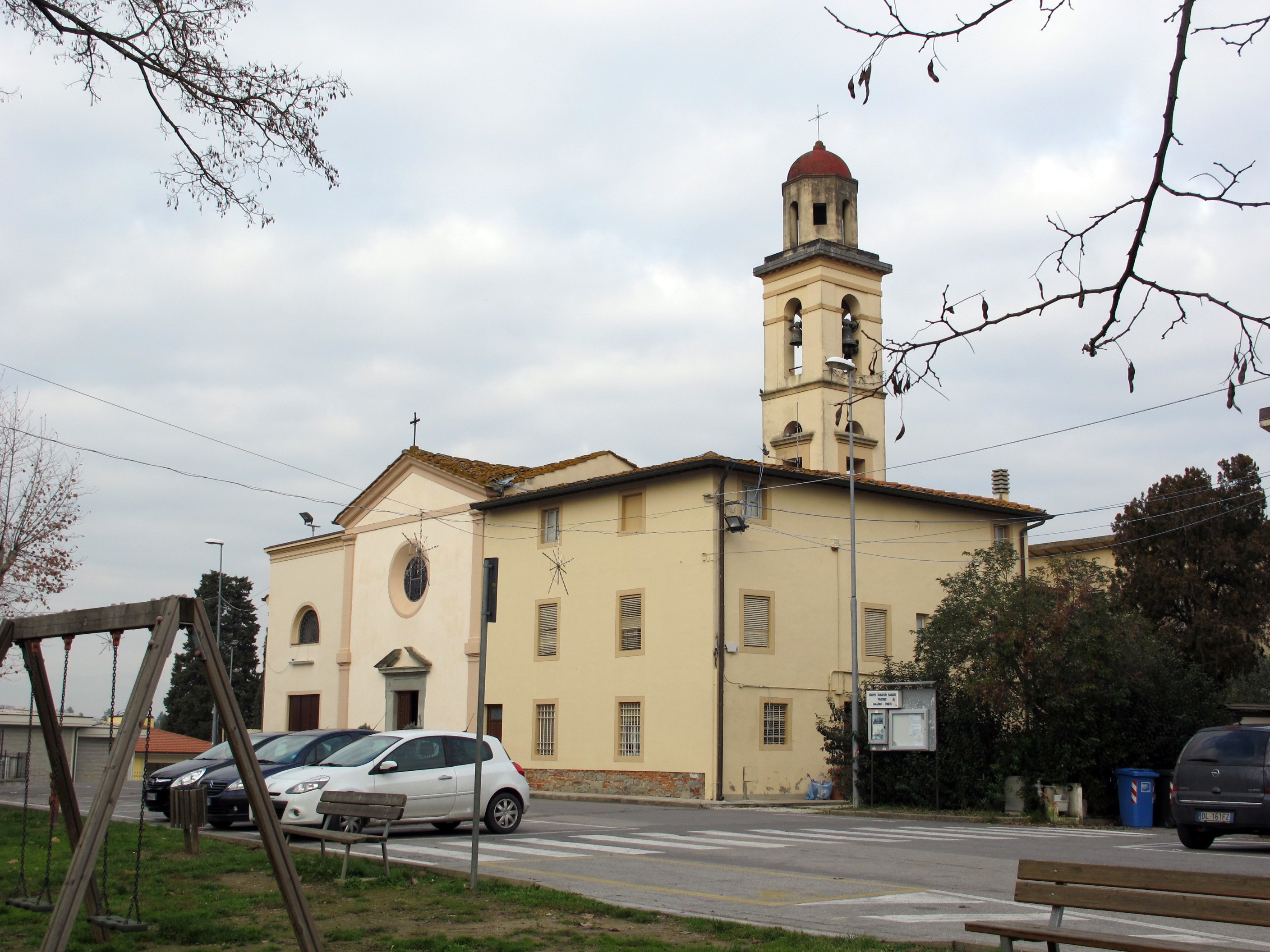
- The church of Santi Pietro e Paolo in Galleno

- Location of Galleno in Italy
- Coordinates: 43°46′28″N 10°43′16″E
- Country: Italy
- Region: Tuscany
- Province: Pisa (PI); Florence (FI)
- Comune: Castelfranco di Sotto; Fucecchio
- Elevation: 34 m (112 ft)

Population (2001)
  - Total: 609
- Time zone: UTC+1 (CET)
  - Summer (DST): UTC+2 (CEST)
- Postal code: 50054; 56020
- Dialing code: (+39) 0571 / 0583

Galleno is a village in Tuscany, central Italy, administratively a frazione of the comuni of Castelfranco di Sotto (province of Pisa) and Fucecchio (Metropolitan City of Florence). At the time of the 2001 census its population was 609.

Galleno is about 42 km from Pisa, 12 km from Castelfranco di Sotto and 10 km from Fucecchio.
