= Luca Cecconi =

Italian footballer and manager

Personal information
- Full name: Luca Cecconi
- Date of birth: January 24, 1964 (age 62)
- Place of birth: Fucecchio, Italy
- Height: 1.74 m (5 ft 9 in)
- Position: Striker

Senior career*
Years	Team	Apps	(Gls)
1982–1983	Fiorentina	2	(0)
1983–1984	Empoli (loan)	33	(5)
1984–1985	Fiorentina	7	(2)
1985–1986	Empoli	32	(7)
1986–1988	Pisa	60	(12)
1988–1990	Brescia	21	(1)
1990–1991	Catania	23	(9)
1991–1993	Palermo	64	(17)
1993–1995	Bologna	52	(25)
1995–1998	Como	85	(41)
1998–1999	Pistoiese	1	(0)

Managerial career
- 1999–2003: Empoli (youth team)
- 2003–2004: Bologna (youth team)
- 2004: Prato
- 2005, 2006–2007: Bologna (assistant coach)
- 2007: Bologna (caretaker)
- * Club domestic league appearances and goals

Luca Cecconi (born 24 January 1964 in Fucecchio, Province of Florence) is an Italian football manager and former striker.

== Playing career ==
Cecconi played with several teams throughout his career, obtaining his best successes with Palermo, Bologna and Como.

== Coaching career ==
In 1999 Cecconi was appointed as Empoli Primavera youth squad coach, winning a Torneo di Viareggio in 2000. He left Empoli in 2003, being appointed one year later as Prato head coach and serving in the four initial matchdays of the 2004-05 Serie C1 season, all ended in a defeat for his side.

He then worked alongside Renzo Ulivieri at Bologna in 2005, and again during the 2006–07 season, and successively replaced him in April 2007, serving as caretaker head coach in the two remaining months of their Serie B campaign.
