= Castelpoggio =

- Frazione
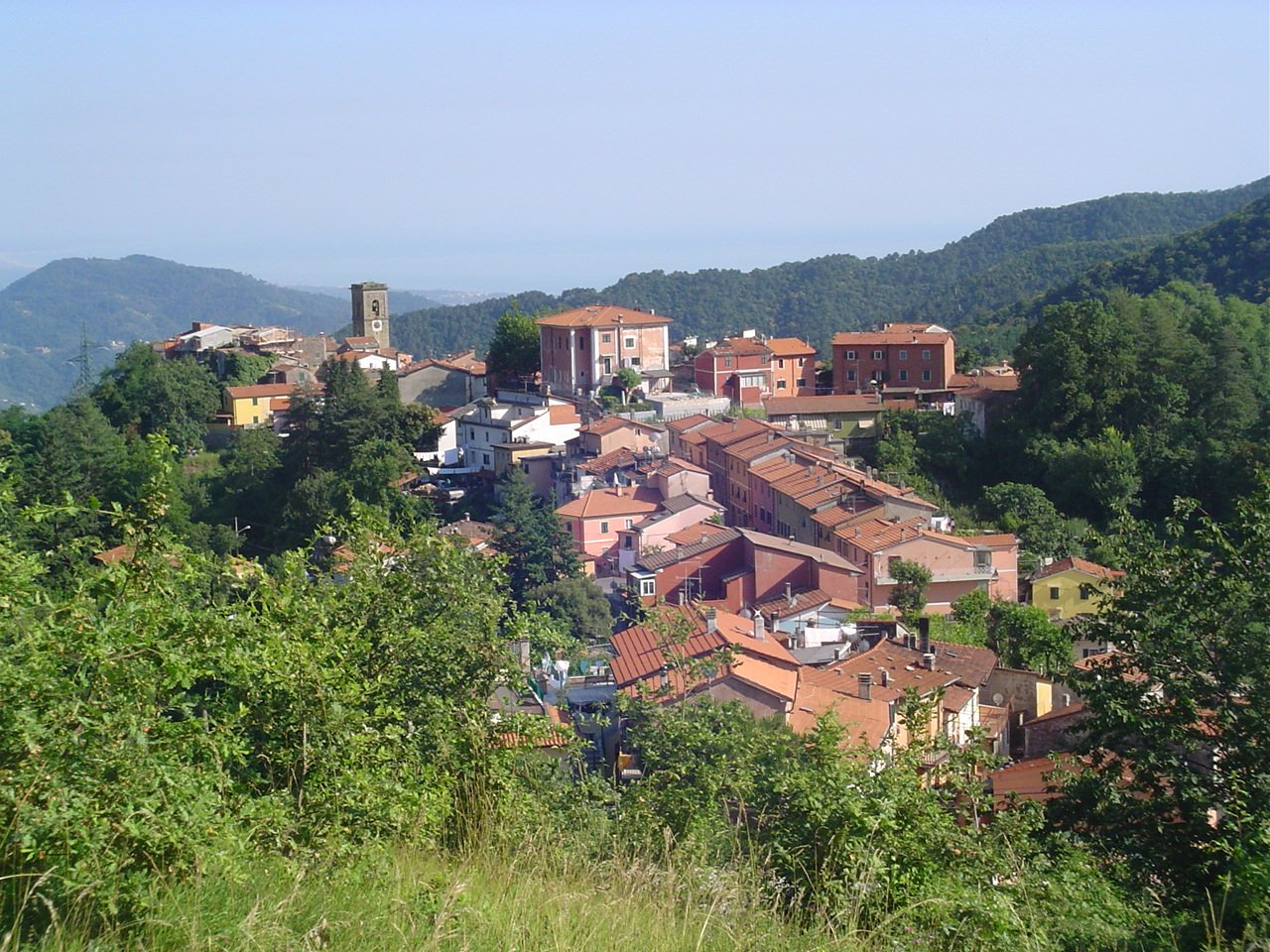
- Panorama of Castelpoggio

- Location of Castelpoggio in Italy
- Coordinates: 44°06′44″N 10°04′28″E
- Country: Italy
- Region: Tuscany
- Province: Massa and Carrara
- Comune: Carrara
- Time zone: UTC+1 (CET)
  - Summer (DST): UTC+2 (CEST)

Castelpoggio is a frazione (borough) of the comune of Carrara, in northwest Tuscany, central Italy. As of 2001, it had around 360 inhabitants.

It is located on the slopes of the Apuan Alps, overlooking the plain of Luni.

Remains of human presence in the area date from as early as the Neolithic Age. The current borough originated perhaps from a Byzantine stronghold built to defend Luni from Lombard raids.

The first document mentioning Castelpoggio proper date from 997 AD. During World War II, German occupation forces killed 33 people and burned down much of the village in retaliation for Italian partisan activity in the area. On 14 April 1945, the 100th Infantry Battalion successfully defended this newly-captured town against a German counter-attack. TLater that day, the Germans left behind 35 killed and 8 wounded.

== Sources ==
- Ricci, Angelo (1984). Castelpoggio. Un paese del comune di Carrara con mille anni della sua storia. Centro Studi storia locale.
