= Luni Cathedral =

Cathedral in Luni, Italy

Denomination	Catholic
Located	Luni
Founded	4th - 5th century
Diocese	Diocese of Luni

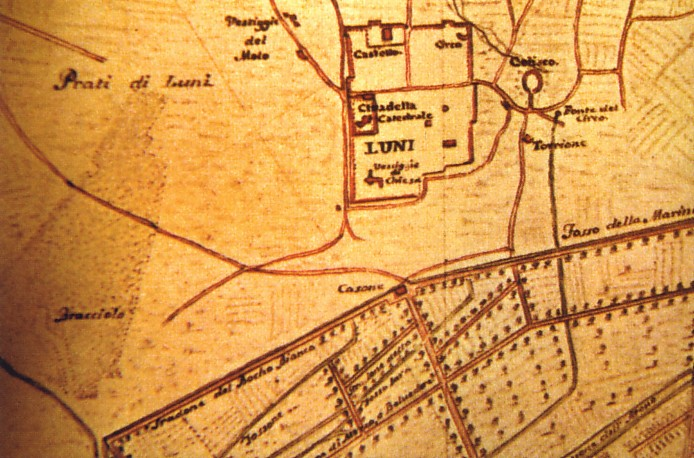
Map of the area of Luni in the 16th century

Luni Cathedral, previously the Pieve of Santa Maria, was located in Luni, in Liguria, Italy, near the port. According to archaeological discoveries the church was built by the Romans in the late 4th and early 5th century and was the centre of the Diocese of Luni.

The cathedral was mentioned for the first time in a document of 879 by Carloman, King of Italy. Up to the 12th century it underwent several restorations before being abandoned along with the city in the early 13th century, when the seat of the Bishop of Luni was transferred to Sarzana, where in the course of time Sarzana Cathedral was built and replaced that of Luni, which eventually fell entirely into ruin. Despite this, until well into the 13th century the bishops of Luni celebrated mass annually in the remains of the old cathedral.

As a Cathedral, the Pieve di Santa Maria was considered the "mother" of all the churches in the diocese, but its parish jurisdiction was limited to the city and the surrounding countryside, approximately encompassing the left bank of the Magra River, the right bank of the Lavello ditch, up to the Nazzano area near Carrara: it included present-day Marina di Carrara, Nazzano, Avenza, and Fontia in the municipality of Carrara, a small part of Fosdinovo, all of Ortonovo and Castelnuovo Magra, as well as portions of Ameglia and Sarzana.

In this extensive territory, there were multiple religious buildings, primarily the other churches of Luni: one dedicated to Saint Peter (of which only the toponym and the street San Pero remain), a chapel dedicated to Saint Giuliana near the port, one to Saint Maurizio, along with a hospital. The spread of marshes and malaria, as well as Saracen and Norman raids, led to the progressive abandonment of the city, and the bishop himself, along with the Chapter, wandered through villages for about two centuries, although they returned to Luni and its cathedral for solemn feasts.

The Chapter of the Lunense Cathedral emerged within the early 8th century and possessed various assets, including a chapel dedicated to San Martino in the Ortonovo area, the church of San Pietro in Avenza, the hospitals of San Lazzaro in the homonymous locality of Sarzana and San Leonardo in Castelnuovo Magra, in the Ospedale locality.

After lengthy negotiations, Bishop Gualtiero II in 1201, in agreement with the canons, obtained the transfer of the episcopal see from the Cathedral of Luni to Sarzana "with the authority of Lord Innocent III for the common benefit of the entire clergy and people of the diocese" because there was no hope left of its rebuilding." This decision was further ratified by the Pope in 1203 and 1204, considering Luni "...so devoured and consumed by its inhabitants that few or none remain there, nor is there any longer a people to preserve and defend the rights and liberties of the Church."

Following this, Bishop Gualtiero II ceded the two Sarzanese pieves to the Chapter, in exchange for the village of Avenza: the parochial territory of the ancient cathedral, reduced to the entire area of Avenza, Nazzano, and Fontia, remained the property of the Chapter, which, since the city was almost deserted and in ruins, practically owned only the rural chapels. On April 25 of each year, the bishop, clergy, and people proceeded in procession among the ruins of the churches; throughout the 13th century, the bishops continued to take possession of the Diocese with a rite celebrated in the ancient cathedral, where the dead were buried at least until the early 14th century.

In the 13th century, the decline of the ancient city, due both to the silting up of port basins and the consequent deterioration of the climate, and to the Barbarian raids, led the bishops to move the diocesan see to Sarzana in 1204. However, they continued to go to Luni for their investiture, like Enrico da Fucecchio, who in 1273 wanted to celebrate his first mass in what remained of the ancient church.

== Archaeology ==
The archaeological investigations in the area of the Lunense Cathedral in recent decades have been affected by the fact that eighteenth and nineteenth-century excavations irreversibly damaged the archaeological deposit. Moreover, as in the case of Paolo Podestà's interventions from 1889-1897, no useful report was left for the reconstruction of the context.

Excavations conducted by the Superintendent of Antiquities since 1973 have, however, allowed the reconstruction of the different phases of the building's life. It was built, at the end of the 1st century B.C., as a large noble house, consisting of a complex of rooms overlooking a portico open to a garden. The rich residence was renamed the domus of Oceanus, because of the beautiful mosaic it yielded. Part of the structure is still visible corresponding to the central nave and the left nave, as well as to the south of the right nave of the church. The first place of worship, probably the seat of the bishop of Luni, was built between the 4th and 5th centuries. It was a three-nave apsidal church divided by columns and preceded by a narthex. It is not known to which saint the building was dedicated, but it is possible that when it was renovated, in the Byzantine era (6th century), it was dedicated to the "name of Christ," as evidenced by the inscription on a mosaic donated by one Geronzio, perhaps the bishop of Luni. It is certain that from the Carolingian period (8th-9th century), the sources mention the church as the "Pieve di Santa Maria". In this phase, a crypt was built inside the apse, and two side apses were also built. Finally, in the 12th century, the main apse and the facade were rebuilt in the typical Lombard Romanesque style.

== Heritage ==
In 2013, the history of the Cathedral of Luni were presented in an exhibition, set up at the Diocesan Museum of Sarzana, dedicated to the spread of Christianity in the Lunense territory. The exhibition, titled "Faith in the Land of Luni," aimed to present a series of materials from the late ancient and early medieval periods from the excavations of the ancient city of Luna, which attest to the spread of the Christian faith in the area from the beginning of the 5th century A.D.

== Bibliography ==
- Cagnana, A., Lusuardi Siena, S., Ricci, R., Varaldo Grottin, F. (2010): Lettura archeologica delle opere murarie nell'area della cattedrale di Luni, in "Archeologia in Liguria", nuova serie II, pp. 179-198
- Durante, A. (1998): Luni, Santa Maria in "A.A.V.V., Archeologia cristiana in Liguria, aree ed edifici di culto tra IV e IX", scheda 28/1.2.3.4 Genova
- Durante, A. M., Gervasini, L. (2000): Luni. Zona Archeologica e Museo Nazionale, in "Itinerari dei musei, gallerie, scavi e monumenti d'Italia”, Roma
- Lusuardi Siena, S. (1989): La cattedrale di S. Maria, in "Luni, Guida Archeologica" (ed. Frova, A.), pp. 120-129
- Lusuardi Siena, S. (2003): Gli scavi nella Cattedrale di Luni nel quadro della topografa cittadina tra tarda antichità e medioevo, in "Liguria Maritima", pp. 195-202
