= Orentano =

- Frazione
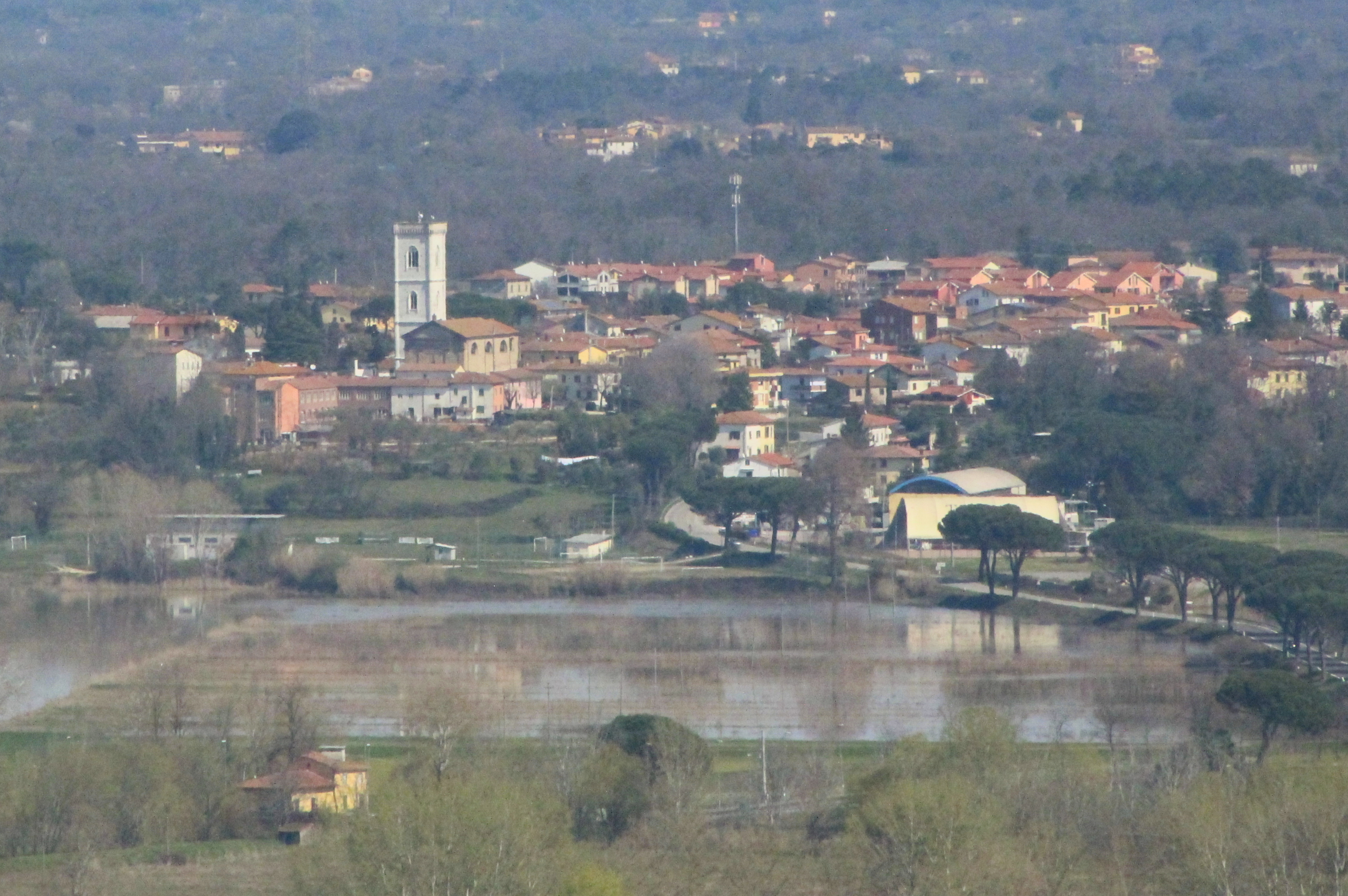

- Location of Orentano in Italy
- Coordinates: 43°46′44″N 10°39′43″E
- Country: Italy
- Region: Tuscany
- Province: Pisa (PI)
- Comune: Castelfranco di Sotto
- Elevation: 27 m (89 ft)

Population (2011)
  - Total: 1,676
- Demonym: Orentanesi
- Time zone: UTC+1 (CET)
  - Summer (DST): UTC+2 (CEST)
- Postal code: 56022
- Dialing code: (+39) 0583

Orentano is a village in Tuscany, central Italy, administratively a frazione of the comune of Castelfranco di Sotto, province of Pisa. At the time of the 2001 census its population was 1,313.

Orentano is about 32 km from Pisa and 16 km from Castelfranco di Sotto.
