= Villa Campanario =

Coordinates: 41°03′22″S 71°29′06″W

- Municipality and village
- Interactive map of Villa Campanario
- Country: Argentina
- Province: Río Negro Province
- Time zone: UTC−3 (ART)

Villa Campanario is a village and municipality in Río Negro Province in Argentina.
