= Venere Bianca =

Italian model, pornographic actress and author

Manuela Falorni (born 20 May 1959), best known as Venere Bianca (lit. 'White Venus'), is an Italian model, pornographic actress and author.

== Career ==
Born in Fucecchio, Falorni started her career in 1979, entering the Miss Italia pageant in which she was awarded "Miss Toscana". Then, she started a successful career as a glamour and fashion model. In 1993 she started working as a strip teaser and hosting the TV-show TopClub, the following year she joined the agency "Diva Futura" and made her adult film debut. In 2001 she was nominated at Hot D'Or as best actress for Doom Fighter, a porn parody of Lara Croft.

In 2005 she published her first novel, Di là dal fosso, and in 2010 she published her autobiography, E se andassi in paradiso; the same year she announced her retirement.

In 2012 Falorni starred in the music video for the song "Odio i vivi" by rock songwriter Edda.

== Personal life ==
Falorni was a protagonist of gossip columns, mainly for her tumultuous marriage with ex-European welter-weight boxing champion Nino La Rocca, and for the legal battle for the custody of their son, Antonio.

From 2004 Falorni is married to composer Franco Ciani, well known for a previous marriage with the singer Anna Oxa.
