= Enrico da Fucecchio =

Italian Roman Catholic bishop

- Bishop of Luni
- Church: Catholic Church
- Diocese: Diocese of Luni
- In office: 3 April 1273 – c. 1297
- Predecessor: Guglielmo
- Successor: Antonio Nuvolone da Camilla

Enrico da Fucecchio (died c. 1297) was an Italian Roman Catholic bishop.

He was appointed on April 25, 1273 as Bishop of Diocese of Luni by Pope Gregory X. He insisted on performing his first mass at the Luni Cathedral, a ruined cathedral that had declined since the Roman period.
