= Santa Croce sull'Arno =

Santa Croce sull’Arno
- Comune
- Comune di Santa Croce sull'Arno
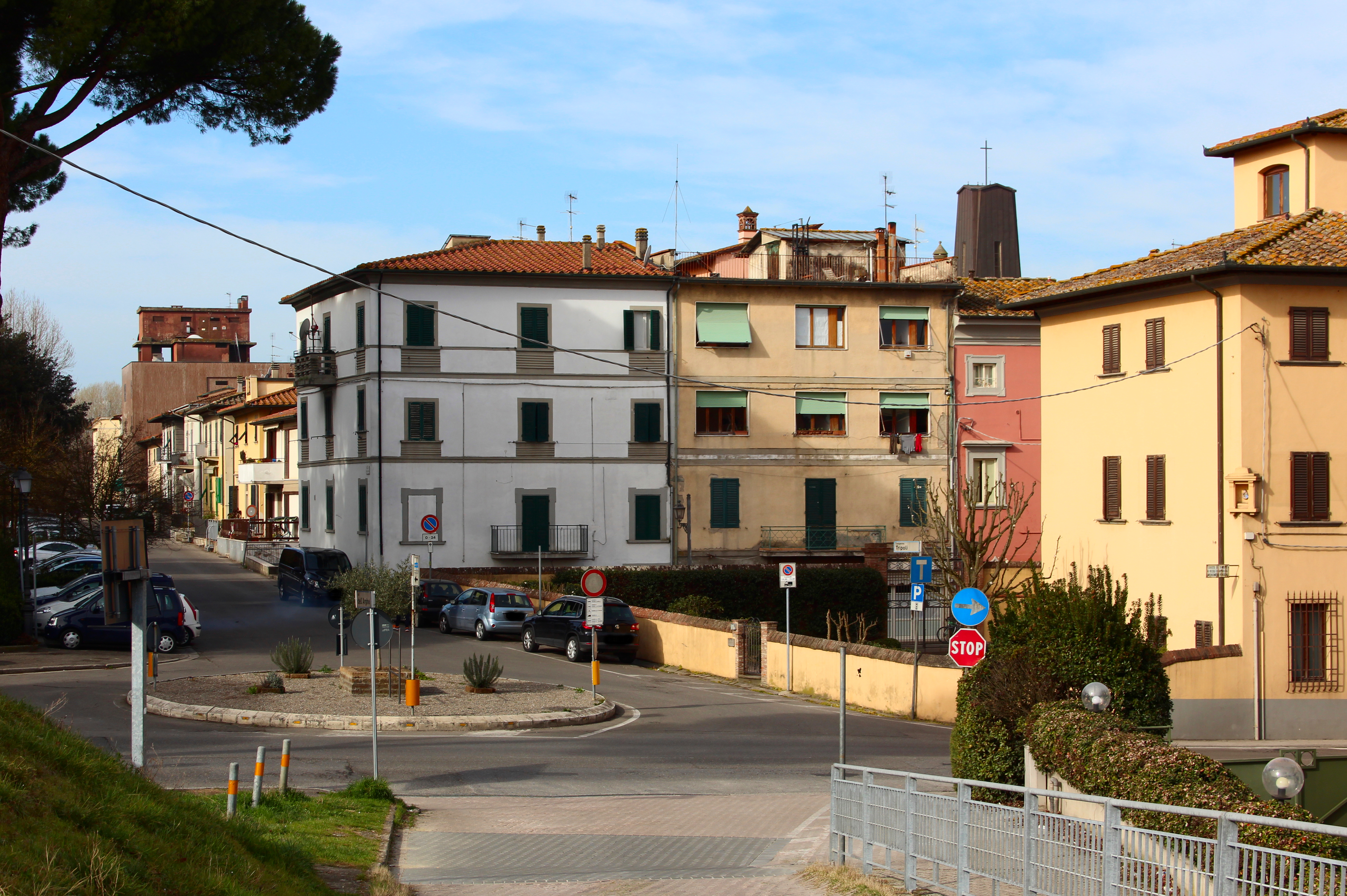
- View of Santa Croce sull'Arno

- Coat of arms

- Location within Italy Location within Tuscany
- Coordinates: 43°43′N 10°47′E
- Country: Italy
- Region: Tuscany
- Province: Province of Pisa (PI)
- Frazioni: Staffoli

Government
  - Mayor: Giulia Deidda

Area
  - Total: 16.99 km^{2} (6.56 sq mi)
- Elevation: 18 m (59 ft)

Population (31 December 2014)
  - Total: 14,528
  - Density: 855.1/km^{2} (2,215/sq mi)
- Demonym: Santacrocesi
- Time zone: UTC+1 (CET)
  - Summer (DST): UTC+2 (CEST)
- Postal code: 56029
- Dialing code: 0571
- Patron saint: Santa Cristiana
- Website: Official website

Santa Croce sull'Arno is an Italian town in the province of Pisa, Tuscany.

== Notable people ==
- Giovanni Lami, antiquarian

== See also ==
- Staffoli
