= Domingo Torredeflot =

Spanish footballer (1908–1974)

Personal information
- Full name: Domingo Torredeflot Solé
- Birth name: Domènec Torredeflot i Solé
- Date of birth: 21 November 1908
- Place of birth: Barcelona, Spain
- Date of death: 19 January 1974 (aged 65)
- Place of death: Barcelona, Spain
- Position: Forward

Senior career*
Years	Team	Apps	(Gls)
1926–1927	FC Poble Nou		
1927–1928	Sants		
1928–1935	Valencia	88	(21)
1935–1937	Barcelona	7	(2)
1937–1938	Girondins de Bordeaux		
1943–1944	Gràcia FC		

International career
1931–1936	Catalonia	3	(1)
- * Club domestic league appearances and goals

Domingo Torredeflot Solé (21 November 1908 – 19 January 1974), also known as Torredeflot II, was a Spanish footballer who played as a forward for Valencia, and Barcelona in the 1930s. He also played for the Catalan national team.

== Club career ==
Born on 21 November 1908 in Catalonian town of Barcelona, Torredeflot began his career at his hometown club FC Poble Nou in 1926, aged 18, where he coincided with his younger brother Josep, and the two of them then went to Sants in 1927. While his brother remained there until 1933, Domingo quickly stood out as a right winger, being noted for his dribbling and feints that allowed him to overcome several defenders, so he was soon spotted by the scouts of Valencia, who signed him in 1928.

Torredeflot played for Valencia for seven years, from 1928 until 1935, during which time he was one of the best right wingers in Spain, scoring a total of 58 goals in 236 matches, and playing a crucial role in helping his team win four Valencia Championships (1930–31, 1931–32, 1932–33, 1933–34) as well as the 1930–31 Segunda División, thus achieving promotion to the top-flight. He soon became known as "Chevrolet", not only because of his great speed, but also due to the car he drove.

In May 1934, Torredeflot played a friendly match for Barcelona against Wiener SC, featuring alongside Mariano García de la Puerta, who at the time was a Real Betis player. In 1935, following some disagreements with the club's board, he left the club and signed for Barcelona, where he scored a total of 18 goals in 50 matches, including 4 goals in 13 official matches, helping his side win the Catalan championship in 1936, but his career was then interrupted by the outbreak of the Spanish Civil War. In total, he scored 18 goals in 70 matches for Valencia and Barça. In 1937, he left war-torn Spain to go to France, where he joined the ranks of Girondins de Bordeaux, where he retired from football.

== International career ==
Torredeflot was eligible to play for the Catalan national team, making his debut against Gimnástico FC in a tribute match to Jesús Pedret on 9 August 1931 at the Vallejo, scoring once to help his side to a 5–2 win. Two years later, on 30 July 1933, he played against Catalonia in a tribute match to Sants' player Frederic Soligó, starting for his former club Sants alongside his brother Josep in a 2–1 victory. The following year, on 15 August 1934, he started alongside his brother in a tribute match to Josep Calvet, helping their side to a 3–0 win over their former club Sants. The Torredeflot started together one last time on 15 November 1936, in a 4–0 loss to Valencia.

== Death ==
Torredeflot died in Barcelona on 19 January 1974, at the age of 65.

== Honours ==
Valencia

- Segunda División: 1930–31
- Valencia Championship: 1930–31, 1931–32, 1932–33, 1933–34

Barcelona

- Catalan championship: 1935–36
