= 1935–36 Campionat de Catalunya =

Campionat de Catalunya
- Season: 1935–36
- Champions: Barcelona
- Relegated: Júpiter
- Matches: 30
- Goals: 118 (3.93 per match)
- Top goalscorer: Josep Escolà (18 goals)
- Biggest home win: Barcelona 11–0 Júpiter (20 October 1935)
- Biggest away win: Júpiter 0–4 Girona (6 October 1935)
- Highest scoring: Espanyol 7–4 Júpiter (13 October 1935); Barcelona 11–0 Júpiter (20 October 1935)

The 1935–36 Campionat de Catalunya season was the 37th since its establishment and was played between 1 September and 3 November 1935.

== Overview before the season ==
Six teams joined the Division One league, including two that would play the 1935–36 La Liga and four from the 1935–36 Segunda División.

From La Liga

- Barcelona
- Espanyol

From Segunda División

- Badalona
- Girona
- Júpiter
- Sabadell

== Division One ==
=== League table ===
Pos	Team	Pld	W	D	L	GF	GA	GD	Pts	Qualification or relegation
1	Barcelona (C)	10	9	1	0	41	9	+32	19	
2	Badalona	10	4	3	3	15	16	−1	11	
3	Sabadell	10	3	3	4	13	19	−6	9	
4	Espanyol	10	3	2	5	18	19	−1	8	
5	Girona	10	3	2	5	17	19	−2	8	
6	Júpiter (R)	10	2	1	7	14	36	−22	5	Relegation to Division Two

Source: BDFútbol
Rules for classification: 1) points; 2) head-to-head points; 3) head-to-head goal difference; 4) goal difference; 5) number of goals scored
(C) Champions; (R) Relegated

=== Results ===
Home \ Away	BAD	FCB	ESP	GIR	JUP	SAB
Badalona	—	0–2	3–0	0–0	2–1	1–1
Barcelona	5–2	—	1–1	5–2	11–0	4–1
Espanyol	1–1	1–2	—	2–1	7–4	2–0
Girona	3–1	0–3	2–1	—	2–3	1–1
Júpiter	2–3	0–3	3–2	0–4	—	0–1
Sabadell	1–2	2–5	2–1	3–2	1–1	—

Source: BDFútbol
Legend: Blue = home team win; Yellow = draw; Red = away team win.

=== Top goalscorers ===
Goalscorers	Goals	Team
(Spain) Josep Escolà	18	Barcelona
(Spain) Martí Ventolrà	7	Barcelona
(Wales) George Green	7	Espanyol
(Spain) Juan Trujillo	6	Girona
(Spain) Serra	5	Badalona

== Division Two ==
=== League table ===
Pos	Team	Pld	W	D	L	GF	GA	GD	Pts	Qualification or relegation
1	Granollers (C, P)	14	9	1	4	33	15	+18	19	Promoted to Division One
2	Sant Andreu	14	7	2	5	23	18	+5	16	
3	Europa	14	7	2	5	30	21	+9	16	
4	Terrassa	14	7	0	7	28	29	−1	14	
5	Horta	14	6	1	7	29	33	−4	13	
6	Martinenc	14	5	2	7	30	35	−5	12	
7	Sants	14	4	4	6	23	31	−8	12	
8	Calella	14	3	4	7	22	36	−14	10	

Source: BDFútbol
Rules for classification: 1) points; 2) head-to-head points; 3) head-to-head goal difference; 4) goal difference; 5) number of goals scored
(C) Champions; (P) Promoted
