= Villa Campanile =

- Frazione
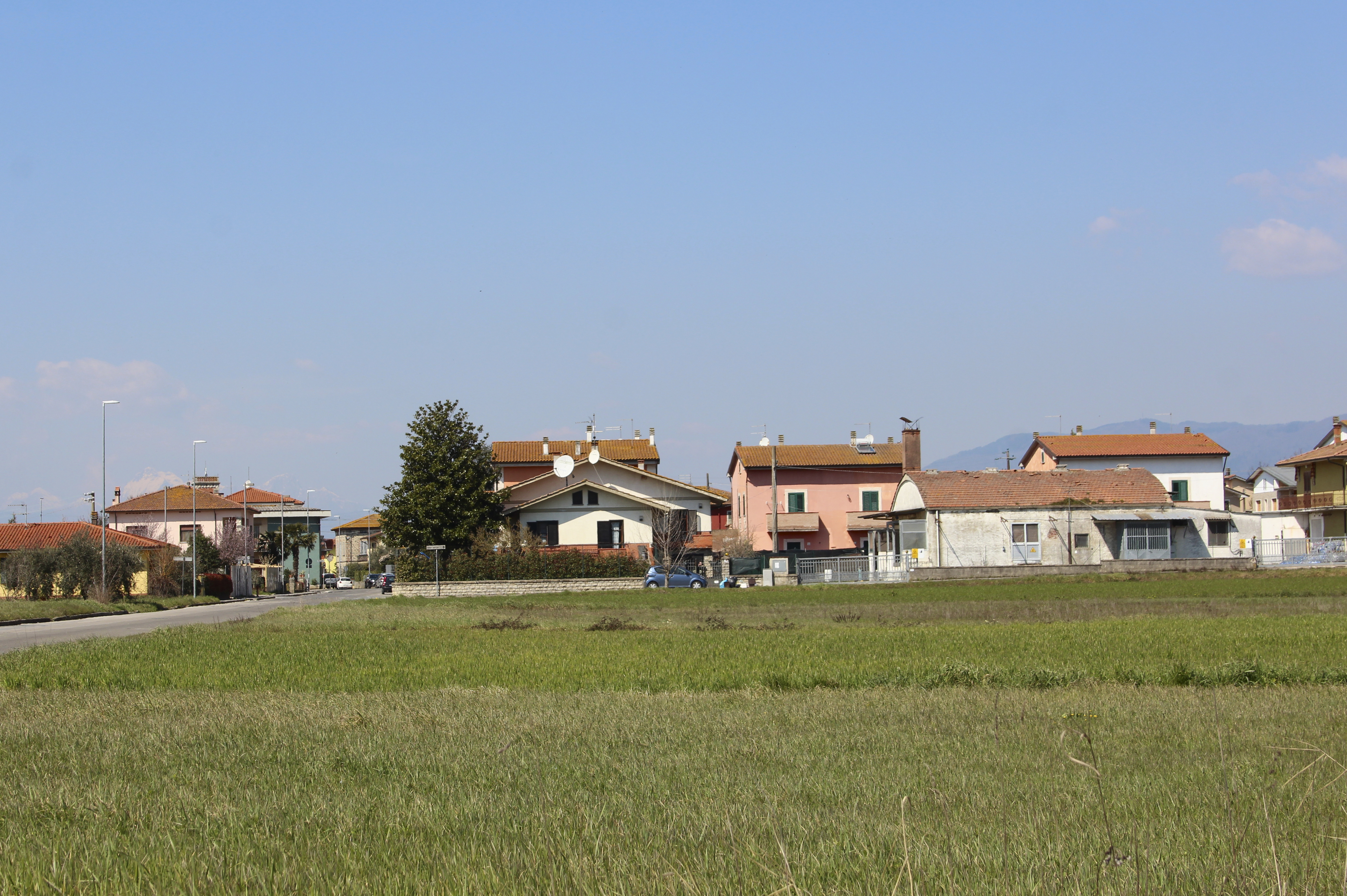

- Location of Villa Campanile in Italy
- Coordinates: 43°47′28″N 10°41′17″E
- Country: Italy
- Region: Tuscany
- Province: Pisa (PI)
- Comune: Castelfranco di Sotto
- Elevation: 30 m (98 ft)

Population (2011)
  - Total: 694
- Time zone: UTC+1 (CET)
  - Summer (DST): UTC+2 (CEST)
- Postal code: 56022
- Dialing code: (+39) 0583

Villa Campanile is a village in Tuscany, central Italy, administratively a frazione of the comune of Castelfranco di Sotto, province of Pisa. At the time of the 2001 census its population was 271.

Villa Campanile is about 38 km from Pisa and 16 km from Castelfranco di Sotto.
