= Staffoli =

- Frazione
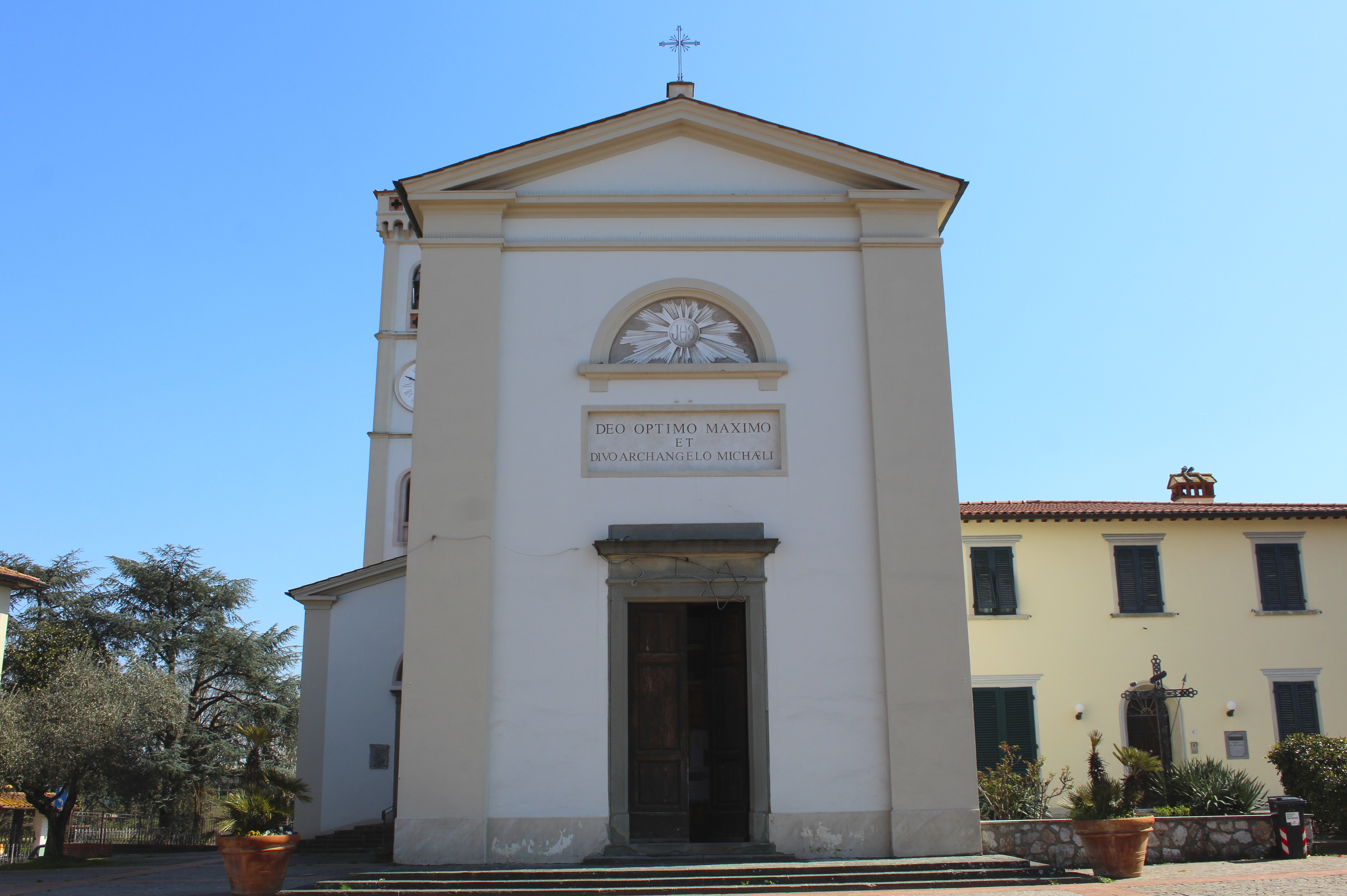
- The church of San Michele Arcangelo

- Location of Staffoli in Italy
- Coordinates: 43°45′14″N 10°42′8″E
- Country: Italy
- Region: Tuscany
- Province: Pisa (PI)
- Comune: Santa Croce sull'Arno
- Elevation: 28 m (92 ft)

Population (2011)
  - Total: 1,486
- Demonym: Staffolesi
- Time zone: UTC+1 (CET)
  - Summer (DST): UTC+2 (CEST)
- Postal code: 56029
- Dialing code: (+39) 0571

Staffoli is a separate fraction of the municipality of Santa Croce sull'Arno, which is situated in the province of Pisa, Tuscany.

Its population in 2005 was about 3,000 people, spread in a territory of less than 4 square kilometers, surrounded by cultivated fields and woods.
