= George Green (footballer, born 1912) =

Welsh footballer

Personal information
- Date of birth: 12 November 1912
- Place of birth: Wales
- Date of death: 15 May 1994 (aged 81)

Senior career*
Years	Team	Apps	(Gls)
1935–193x	Espanyol	14	(1)
1938–1939	Charlton Athletic		

International career
1938–1939	Wales	4	(0)
- * Club domestic league appearances and goals

George Green (12 November 1912 – 1 May 1994) was a Welsh international footballer. He was part of the Wales national football team between 1938 and 1939, playing 4 matches.

== Career ==
=== RCD Espanyol ===
Landing at Spanish club Espanyol on 29 August 1935, Green was the first Welshman to have played in Spain at the time, making his debut in a 1–1 tie with CF Badalona in the Catalonia Championship and showing good touches of the ball. It was in a 3–0 victory over Osasuna that the defender-cum-midfielder delivered his first goal, leaving to London where he planned to marry, take a vacation, and return to Spain; but, on account of the Spanish Civil War, he never went back to the country.

=== International ===
He played his first match on 16 March 1938 against Ireland and his last match on 21 May 1939 against France.

== See also ==
- List of Wales international footballers (alphabetical)
