= Via Aemilia Scauri =

Ancient Roman road in northern Italy

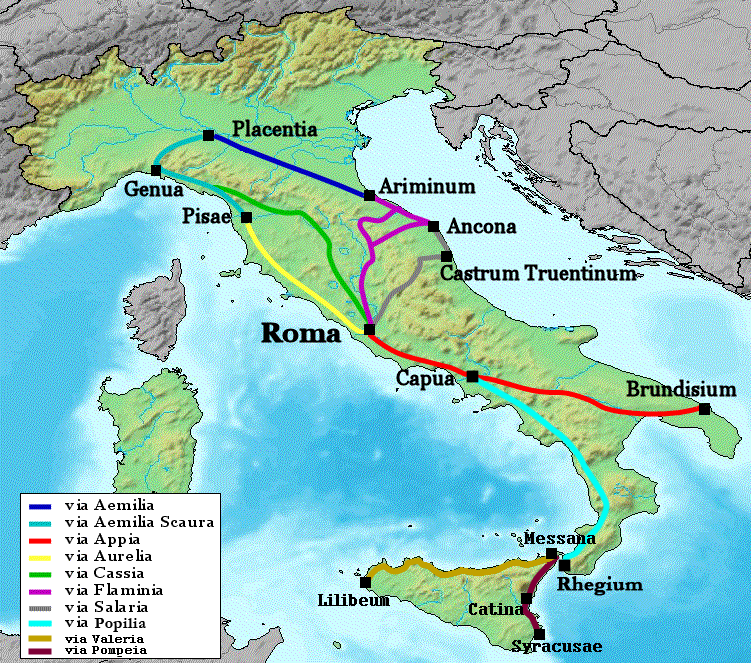
Route of Via Aemilia Scaura (in light blue)

The Via Aemilia Scauri (or Scaura) was an ancient Roman road built by the consul Marcus Aemilius Scaurus during his term as censor in 109 BC.

== Route ==
It is mainly a coastal road, extending the Via Aurelia from Pisae to connect Rome to Placentia, passing through Genoa.

Further north, the Via Aemilia Scauri merged with the Via Postumia to become the Via Julia Augusta.
