= Ramón Escolà =

Spanish footballer (born 1907)

Personal information
- Full name: Ramón Escolà Cirera
- Date of birth: 11 December 1907
- Place of birth: Barcelona, Spain
- Date of death: unknown
- Place of death: Spain
- Position: Forward

Senior career*
Years	Team	Apps	(Gls)
1927–1928	Espanyol		
1928–1932	Logroñés		
1932–1933	Sants		
1933–1934	Badalona		
1934	Espanyol	2	(0)
1934–1935	Levante	7	(2)
- * Club domestic league appearances and goals

Ramón Escolà Cirera (11 December 1907 – unknown) was a Spanish footballer who played as a forward for Espanyol.

== Playing career ==
Born on 11 December 1907 in Barcelona, Catalonia, Escolà began his football career at his hometown club Espanyol in 1927, aged 20, but during his first season there, he was only able to play in a few friendlies. Unsatisfied with his lack of playing time, he left Espanyol at the end of the season to join Logroñés, where he stayed for four years, from 1928 until 1932, when he left for Sants, with whom he played for a single season, scoring his first goal for the club in his last match with them, helping his side to a 2–1 win over the Catalan national team in a tribute match to Sants' player Frederic Soligó on 30 July 1933.

Escolà then played the first half of the 1933–34 season with Badalona, and the second with his former club Espanyol, with whom he only played two official matches, both in La Liga. He then joined Segunda División team Levante, where he retired at the end of the 1934–35, aged 28.

== Later life ==
In December 1938, Escolà was working as an agent of the General Police Station of Barcelona.
