= List of destroyed landmarks in Spain =

This list of missing landmarks in Spain includes remarkable buildings, castles, royal palaces, medieval towers, city gates and other noteworthy structures that no longer exist in Spain, or have been partially destroyed. It does not include walls of cities. City gates are included.

There are hundreds of ruins of destroyed landmarks all over Spain, although there are many famous structures standing. Many of these destroyed monuments could be important examples of cultures passed, of that cities today.

The following is an incomplete list.

== List (by city and then alphabetical order) ==
=== Buildings ===
Image	Name	Location	Architectural style/era	Date of construction	Date / period of demolition / refurbishment	Status
	Archbishop's Palace of Alcalá de Henares	Alcalá de Henares, Community of Madrid	Mudéjar, Herrerian	1209	1939, during the Spanish Civil War	Partially survives
	Puente Colgado	Aranjuez, Community of Madrid	Classicist	1820s	during the Francoist period	Demolished
	Balneario da Toxa	A Toxa Island, Galicia	Galician Regionalist of the time	1907	1945, during the Francoist period	Almost complete refurbishment
	Avinguda de la Llum	Barcelona, Catalonia	Modern	1940	1992, during the modern government and autonomies	Partially survives
	Casa Trinxet	Barcelona, Catalonia	Modernisme	1904	1968, during the Francoist period	Demolished
	Hotel Internacional	Barcelona, Catalonia	Modernisme	1888	1889, during the Spanish confiscation period	Demolished
	Palace of the Viceroy	Barcelona, Catalonia	Baroque, Neoclassical, Gothic-Revival	1668	1875, by a fire during the Spanish confiscation period	Demolished
	Tower of Saint John	Barcelona, Catalonia		1249, rebuilt in 1751	1868, during the dictatorship of general Juan Prim	Demolished
	Tibidabo International Casino	Barcelona, Catalonia	Modernisme	1909	1912, during the Spanish confiscation period	Demolished
	Former Banco de Vizcaya Building	Bilbao, Basque Country	Eclectic	?	1968, during the Francoist period	Demolished
	Castle of Burgos	Burgos, Castile and León	Visigothic, Moorish, Christian	?	1813, during the Napoleonic French invasion	Ruins survive
	Church of San Pedro Mártir	Calatayud, Aragon	Mudéjar	1368	1856, during the Spanish confiscation period	Demolished
	Templar church of Saint Mary	Ceinos de Campos, Castile and León	Romanesque	12th century	late 19th century, during the Spanish confiscation period	Some elements survives and some adorn the town's houses
	Alcázar of the Caliphs	Córdoba, Andalusia	Moorish	?, 8th century	14th century, after the Castilian taking of the city	Part of its structure survives
	Cuenca Cathedral façade and tower	Cuenca, Castile-La Mancha	Romanesque, Anglo and French Norman Gothic	1257	1902, collapsed	The main facade was reconstructed in gothic revival style by Vicente Lampérez, but remains unfinished
	Gate of the Ears	Granada, Andalusia	Moorish	12th century	1884, during the Spanish confiscation period and the ensanches/eixamples	A smaller arc from the accumulated original remains of the Gate of the Ears it survives.
	Buen Retiro Palace	Madrid, Community of Madrid	Herrerian	1640	1808, during the Napoleonic French invasion	Partially survives
	Buen Retiro Porcelain Factory	Madrid, Community of Madrid		1760	1812, by the English during the Napoleonic invasion period	Many porcelains manufactured by the factory survives
	Casa del Tesoro	Madrid, Community of Madrid	Christian	16th century	19th century, during the Napoleonic French invasion	Demolished
	Church of San Salvador	Madrid, Community of Madrid	Romanesque, Herrerian	12th century	1868, during the Spanish confiscation period	Demolished
	Church of Santa Cruz	Madrid, Community of Madrid	Romanesque	13th century	1868, during the Spanish confiscation period	Demolished
	Churches of the Buen Suceso	Madrid, Community of Madrid	Baroque	1611, 1868	1854, 1975, during the ensanches/eixamples in the Spanish confiscation period and during the Francoist period	Demolished
	Convent of the Calced Carmel	Madrid, Community of Madrid	Christian	1575	late 19th century, during the ensanches/eixamples in the Spanish confiscation period	Its parish church survives
	Convent of Copacabana	Madrid, Community of Madrid	Baroque	1620	1837, during the Spanish confiscation period	Demolished
	Convent of the Nativity and Saint Joseph	Madrid, Community of Madrid	Baroque	1700	1836, during the Spanish confiscation period	Demolished
	Convent of San Felipe el Real	Madrid, Community of Madrid	Baroque	1547	1838, during the Spanish confiscation period	Demolished
	Convent of San Norberto	Madrid, Community of Madrid	Baroque	1611	1811, during the Napoleonic French invasion	Demolished
	Convent of Santo Tomás	Madrid, Community of Madrid	Baroque	1656	1872, during the Spanish confiscation period	Demolished
	Gate of Atocha	Madrid, Community of Madrid	Neoclassical	1769	1850, during the Spanish confiscation period	Demolished
	Gothic-Mudéjar church of Humanejos	Madrid, Community of Madrid	Gothic, Mudéjar	14th century	19th century, 1980, during the Spanish confiscation period and the modern government and autonomies	Demolished
	Fiesta Alegre fronton	Madrid, Community of Madrid	Baroque Revival	1892	1965, during the Francoist period	Demolished
	Hotel Florida	Madrid, Community of Madrid	Ecleptic	1924	1964, during the Francoist period	Demolished
	Noviciado de la Compañía de Jesús	Madrid, Community of Madrid	Baroque	1606	1836, during the Spanish confiscation period	Partially survives
	Palace of the Marquis of Alcañices	Madrid, Community of Madrid	Herrerian	17th century	1883, during the ensanches/eixamples in the Spanish confiscation period	Demolished
	Palace of Indo	Madrid, Community of Madrid	Neo-Renaissance	1866	1904, during the Spanish confiscation period	Gardens partially survives
	Palace of La Moncloa before the Spanish Civil War	Madrid, Community of Madrid	Neoclassical	1781	1940s, during the Spanish Civil War and during the Francoist period	Demolished
	Palace of Xifré	Madrid, Community of Madrid	Moorish Revival	1862	1950, during the Francoist period	Elements survives
	Palace of the Duke of Arión	Madrid, Community of Madrid	Neo-Renaissance	19th century	1960s, during the Francoist period	Demolished
	Palace of the Duke of Úceda in Plaza de Colón	Madrid, Community of Madrid	Neo-Baroque	1864	1964, during the Francoist period	Demolished
	Palaces of the Marquis of Casa Riera	Madrid, Community of Madrid	Neo-Renaissance	early 19th century, 1894	1893, 1916, both during the Spanish confiscation period	Part of the gardens survives
	Palace of the Marquis of Portugalete	Madrid, Community of Madrid	Neo-Renaissance	1860s	1945, during the Francoist period	Demolished
	Royal Alcázar of Madrid	Madrid, Community of Madrid	Moorish, Herrerian	9th century	Christmas Eve 1734, a fire started in the chamber of the French artist Jean Ranc, during the kingdom of the first Bourbon	Part of the painting collection of its interior survives
	Former Royal Armoury of Madrid	Madrid, Community of Madrid	Christian	1565	1884, during the Spanish confiscation period	Much of its armoury collection survives
	Tower of la Parada	Madrid, Community of Madrid	Herrerian	1549	1714, by a fire caused by Austrian troops during the War of the Spanish Succession	Ruins survives
	Windsor Tower	Madrid, Community of Madrid	Skyscraper	1975	2005	Burnt and replaced with Torre Titania
	Casas Consistoriales on Plaza de la Constitución	Málaga, Andalusia	Renaissance	?	late 19th century, during the Spanish confiscation period	Demolished
	Palace of the Orchards of the Bombs	Murcia, Region of Murcia	Baroque	late 17th century	1960s, during the Francoist period	Complete portal survives
	Edificio Castromil	Santiago de Compostela, Galicia	Galician Regionalist of the time	1926	1975, during the Francoist period	Demolished
	Castle Alcázar of Segorbe	Segorbe, Valencian Community	Moorish, Christian	?	1714, during the kingdom of the first Bourbon	Ruins survives
	Roman aqueduct Caños de Carmona	From Carmona to Seville, Andalusia	Roman, Moorish	1st century BC	1912, during the Spanish confiscation period	Three sections in Seville survives
	Castle of San Jorge	Seville, Andalusia	Visigothic, Moorish, Christian	¿?	19th century, during the Spanish confiscation period	Ruins of all sections survives
	Gran Café de París	Seville, Andalusia	Modernisme	1906	1950s, during the Francoist period	Demolished
	Institute of Hygiene of the Doctor Murga	Seville, Andalusia	Neoclassical	1907	1958, during the Francoist period	Demolished
	Palace of Sánchez Dalp	Seville, Andalusia	Andalusian Regionalist of the time	early 20th century	1960s, during the Francoist period	Demolished
	Palace of the Marquis of Palomares	Seville, Andalusia	Andalusian Regionalist of the time	mid-19th century	1965, during the Francoist period	Demolished
	Gate of San Fernando	Seville, Andalusia	Visigothic, Moorish, Christian	1760	1868, during the ensanches/eixamples in the Spanish confiscation period	Demolished
	Gates of Triana	Seville, Andalusia	Moorish, Christian	1588	1868, during the ensanches/eixamples in the Spanish confiscation period	Ruins in different locations survives
	Gate Real	Seville, Andalusia	Possibly Roman, Moorish, Christian	?	1862, during the ensanches/eixamples in the Spanish confiscation period	Remains survives
	Triumphal arches for the arrival of Isabel II to Seville	Seville, Andalusia	Neo-Renaissance	1862	During the Spanish confiscation period	Demolished
	Patriarch's Castle	Tarragona, Catalonia	Christian	13th century	1813, during the Napoleonic French invasion	Demolished
	Bridge of the Exposición Regional Valenciana 1909	Valencia, Valencian Community	Modernisme, Art Deco	1909	1957, in a flood during the Francoist period	Demolished
	Casa de la Ciutat	Valencia, Valencian Community	Valencian Gothic	1302	1860, during the Spanish confiscation period	Many sections survives scattered
	Del Real Royal Palace	Valencia, Valencian Community	Moorish, Valencian Gothic	11th century	1810, during the Napoleonic French invasion	Remains survives
	Modernisme square of the City Hall of Valencia	Valencia, Valencian Community	Modernisme	1931	1950s, during the Francoist period	Demolished
	Palace of the Countess of Ripalda	Valencia, Valencian Community	Eclectic	1891	1967, during the Francoist period	Demolished
	Gate Nou	Valencia, Valencian Community	Christian	1474	1865, during the ensanches/eixamples in the Spanish confiscation period	Demolished
	Gate del Campo	Valladolid, Castile and León	Baroque, Neoclassical	early 14th century	1864, during the Spanish confiscation period	A Michael Archangel's sculpture placed on it survives
	Palace of la Ribera	Valladolid, Castile and León	Herrerian	1605	1761, during the Early Bourbons period	Ruins and elements survives
	Upper bodies of the Benedictine church of San Benito el Real	Valladolid, Castile and León	Gothic, Renaissance	1515	19th century, during the Spanish confiscation period	This church survives but its upper two bodies were lopped
	Convent of Saint Francis	Vitoria-Gasteiz, Basque Country	Gothic	1214	1930, during the Spanish confiscation period	Remains and elements survives
	Portals of Vitoria-Gasteiz	Vitoria-Gasteiz, Basque Country	Christian	?	1856, during the Spanish confiscation period and the ensanches/eixamples	Demolished
	Second tower of the Plaza de la Virgen Blanca	Vitoria-Gasteiz, Basque Country	Christian	?	Second half of 19th century, during the Spanish confiscation period	Its clock was placed in the higher other tower of the plaza
	Convent of Saint Joseph of Discalced Carmel	Zaragoza, Aragon	Christian	1594	1970s, during the modern government and autonomies	Remains survives
	Abbey of Santa Engracia	Zaragoza, Aragon	Visigothic, Gothic, Renaissance	392 AC	1808, during the Napoleonic French invasion	Remains survives
	Convent of Saint Francis	Zaragoza, Aragon	Mudéjar	1357	1809, 19th century, during the Napoleonic French invasion and Spanish confiscation period	Demolished
	Leaning Tower of Zaragoza	Zaragoza, Aragon	Mudéjar	1504	1892, during the Spanish confiscation period	Demolished
	Puerta de Toledo	Zaragoza, Aragon	Roman, Christian	?	1842, during the Spanish confiscation period	Demolished

=== Forts and batteries ===
Image	Name	Location	Architectural style/era	Date of construction	Date / period of demolition / refurbishment	Status
	Battery of San Antonio	Algeciras, Andalusia		1743	19th century, early 20th century, during the Spanish confiscation period	Demolished
	Fort of El Rodeo	Algeciras, Andalusia		1730s	1811, by the English during the Napoleonic invasion period	?
	Fort of Punta Carnero	Between Algeciras and Tarifa, Andalusia		1730	1810, by the English during the Napoleonic invasion period	Ruins survives
	Fort of San García	Algeciras, Andalusia		1730s	1811, by the English during the Napoleonic invasion period	Large ruins survives
	Fort of Santiago	Algeciras, Andalusia		1716	2001, during the modern government and autonomies	Ruins survives
	Fort of El Tolmo	La Línea de la Concepción, Andalusia		1741	1811, by the English during the Napoleonic invasion period	Large ruins survives
	Battery of la Atunara	La Línea de la Concepción, Andalusia		1735	1811, by the English during the Napoleonic invasion period	Demolished
	Lines and Forts of Contravallation of Gibraltar	Northern part of the isthmus linking Spain with Gibraltar, Andalusia		1730	1810, by the English during the Napoleonic invasion period	Ruins survives
	Fort of Punta Mala	San Roque, Andalusia		1735	1811, by the English during the Napoleonic invasion period	Demolished

=== Fountains and memorials ===
Image	Name	Location	Architectural style/era	Date of construction	Date of demolition / refurbishment	Status
	Fountain of the Abundance	Madrid, Community of Madrid	Herrerian, Baroque	1617	19th century, during the Spanish confiscation period	Many architectural elements were integrated into an existing fountain, other sections survived
	Fountain of La Mariblanca (Puerta del Sol)	Madrid, Community of Madrid	Baroque	1727	1838, during the Spanish confiscation period	An element survived
	Fountain of the Harpies	Madrid, Community of Madrid	Baroque	1625	1720s, during the kingdom of the first Bourbon	An element survived
	Former Monument to victims of the attack against Alfonso XIII	Madrid, Community of Madrid	Neo-Renaissance	1908	1930s, during the Second Spanish Republic	Elements survived
	Light fountain of the Valencian Regional Exhibition	Valencia, Valencian Community	Art Nouveau	1909	1910s, during the Spanish confiscation period	Demolished

== See also ==
- Project of Filippo Juvarra for the Royal Palace of Madrid
- Spanish confiscation
- List of submerged places in Spain
