= My Darling =

My Darling or variants may refer to:

== Geography ==
- My Darling, Limpopo, a town in Capricorn District Municipality, Limpopo province, South Africa

== Music ==
=== Albums ===
- My Darling (album), by Jocie Kok

=== Songs ===
- "My Darling", by The Aquatones
- "My Darling", by Eminem, from the album Relapse (Deluxe Version)
- "My Darling", by The Jacks, sung by Ted Taylor
- "My Darling", by Juliana Hatfield, from the album Only Everything
- "My Darlin'", by Miley Cyrus, from the album Bangerz
- "My Darlin", by Tiwa Savage, from the album R.E.D
- "My Darling", by Richard Myers and Edward Heyman
- "My Darling", by Wilco, from the album Summerteeth

== See also ==
- Mi Tesoro (disambiguation)
