= Tesoro =

Tesoro or El Tesoro may refer to:

== People ==
- Ashley Tesoro (born 1983), American actress, model, and singer
  - Tesoro Ministry Foundation, a charity
- Donya Tesoro (born 1991), a Filipina politician
- Giuliana Tesoro (1921–2002), Italian-born American chemist
- Kermit Tesoro (born 1988), a Filipino designer
- Laura Tesoro (born 1996), Belgian singer and actress
- Michelle Tesoro, American film editor
- Patis Tesoro (born 1950), a Filipino fashion designer

== Places ==
- Tesoro railway station, in Bari, Italy
- Camp El Tesoro, a camp in Granbury, Texas, U.S.
- El Tesoro, Maldonado, Uruguay
- Monte Tesoro, a summit of the Bergamasque Prealps in Italy
- Tesoro, former name of Santuario Mártires de Cristo Rey light rail station, in Guadalajara, Mexico
- El Tesoro mine, a copper mine in Atacama Region, Chile

== Other uses ==
- Tesoro Corporation, later known as Andeavor, an American oil and gas company
- Dipartimento del Tesoro, or simply "Tesoro", the Italian department of treasury
- Tesoro High School, in Las Flores, California, U.S.
- Tesoro, a 13th-century translation of Li Livres dou tresor by Brunetto Latini
- El tesoro, a 2016 Colombian telenovela
- El Tesoro tequila, a Mexican brand

== See also ==
- Mi Tesoro (disambiguation)
- Casa del Tesoro (Madrid), a former building in Madrid, Spain
- El Nuevo Tesoro de la Juventud, a Spanish-language encyclopedia
