= Second tower of the Plaza de la Virgen Blanca =

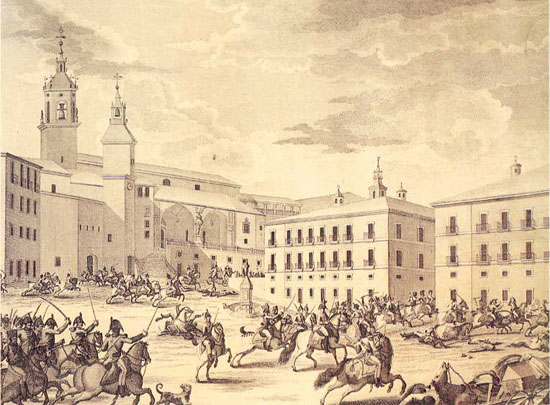
Entrance of General Álava during the Battle of Vitoria in the Napoleonic French Invasion. Drawing located in the Kutxabank archives. (circa 1813). Here seen the two towers crowning the plaza.

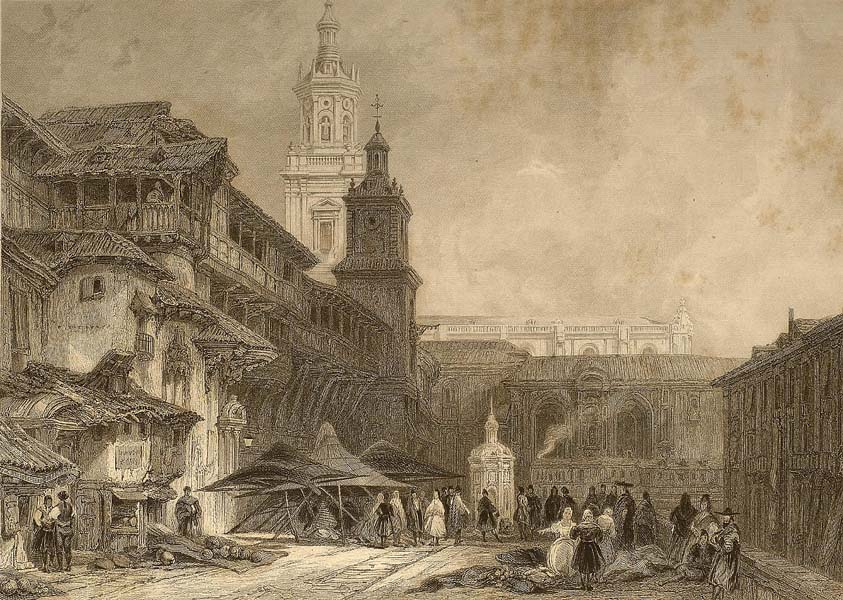
The Plaza de la Virgen Blanca in 1833, Vitoria-Gasteiz, with its two original towers. Still today exist one of this towers rising in the plaza. Drawing by Scottish painter David Roberts, published in the book by English Thomas Roscoe "The Tourist in Spain: Biscay and the Castiles", published in 1837 by Lloyd, R.

The Second tower of the Plaza de la Virgen Blanca, also called Tower of the Correría was the smaller of the two towers that noted for its height, the other (the higher) tower exist today intact, that were in the Plaza de la Virgen Blanca, in Vitoria-Gasteiz (Basque Country autonomous community, Spain).

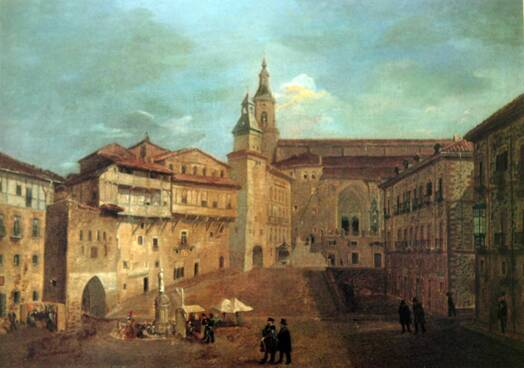
View of the Second Tower of the Plaza de la Virgen Blanca with its gateway. Mainly it was one of the then called Portals of Vitoria-Gasteiz. Drawing of 1855 by Juan Ángel Sáez.

Before 1650 this building was a city gate with a Gothic arc, after the 1650 reform had semicircular arches.

== Remains ==
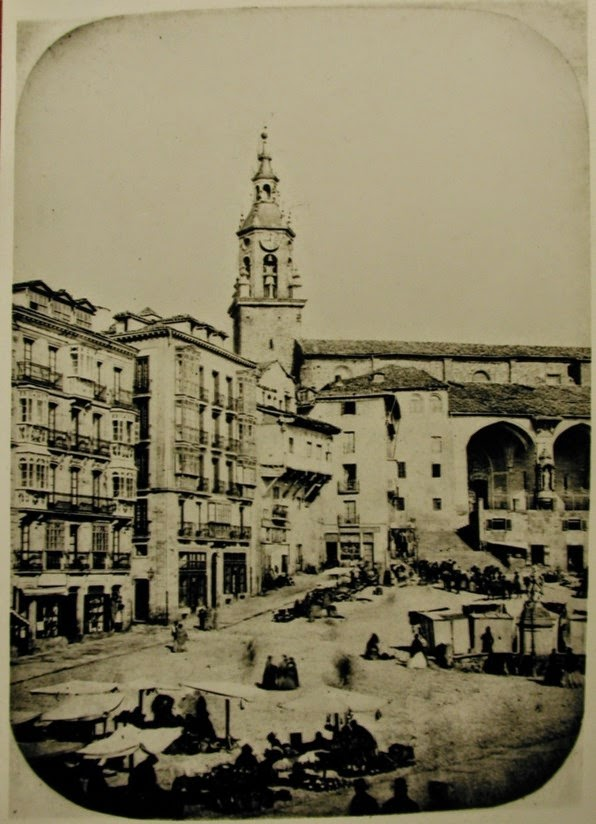
Photograph of the Plaza de la Virgen Blanca already without its second tower (c. 1880).

The San Miguel clock is now a distinctive element of the bell tower of the Church of San Miguel, this bell tower is seen in the foreground in the square.

== See also ==
- Portals of Vitoria-Gasteiz
- Plaza de la Virgen Blanca
- List of missing landmarks in Spain
