= Portals of Vitoria-Gasteiz =

Medieval towers in Spain

Coordinates: 42°51′N 2°41′W

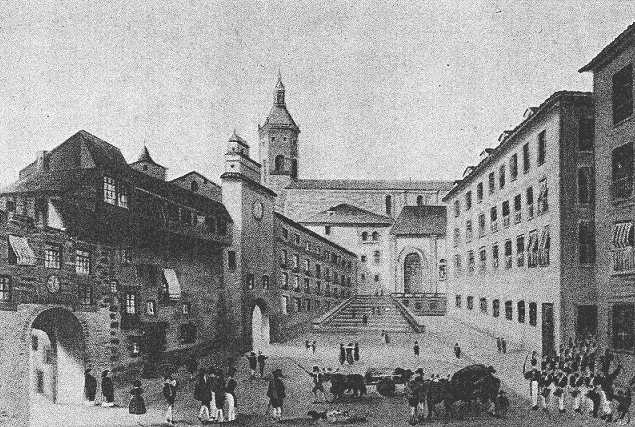
View of the Portals in the Plaza de la Virgen Blanca in 1833, Vitoria-Gasteiz.

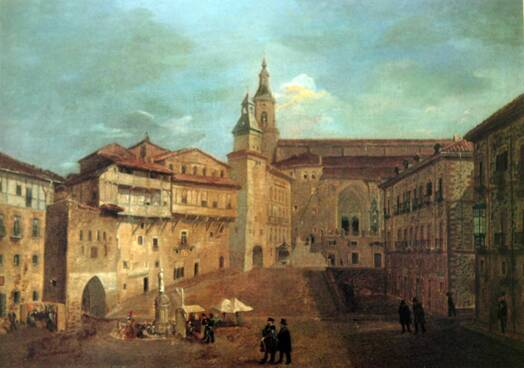
View of the Portals in the Plaza de la Virgen Blanca by Spanish painter Juan Ángel Sáez in 1855.

The Portals or Arcs of Vitoria-Gasteiz were Medieval crenelated towers that fortified the entrances to a street of the city of Vitoria-Gasteiz (in Basque Country in Spain). This tower had a gateway in its center.

A cholera epidemic was used as a pretext to demolish these buildings, between 1854 and 1856. With this demolition, the city lost one of the most characteristic elements of the medieval Vitoria-Gasteiz.

== City layout ==
The eastern city walls had a single entry or access to the Portal del Rey's side, which closed with solid doors every night, as all streets of the city closed.

Access to union neighborhoods was protected by these gateways and corresponding towers.

These towers belonged to civilian Vitorian families who inhabited them and gave their surnames to these buildings.

== See also ==
- Second tower of the Plaza de la Virgen Blanca
- List of missing landmarks in Spain
