= Castell del Patriarca =

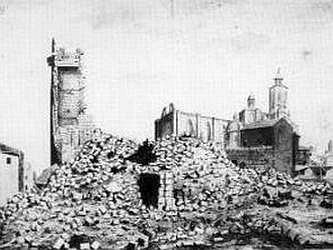
The Castell del Patriarca ruined just after the Napoleonic French explode it. Drawing by Vicens Roig.

The Castell del Patriarca (English for: Patriarch's castle) was a castle that was in the city of Tarragona, Catalonia (Spain). Located from the street Mercería covered up much of the streets of Cocas, de San Lorenzo and the Nueva del Patriarca descent. Its construction was begun in the 12th century by Archbishop Bernat Tort, who built up the height of the second floor, and was completed by the Archbishop Bernat de Olivella in the 13th century. The result was a manor fortress in which lived all the prelates of the Tarraconense headquarter until the early 19th century, when Archbishop Romuald Mon moved to the new palace during his prelature.

Here was prisoner the French king Francis I in the 16th century.

Later, during the period of the Peninsular War, and due to the large increase in troops, the Castle del Patriarca (and also the Castle de Pilat) was intended to serve as accommodation for the Napoleonic French troops. Possibly it was the circumstance that led to it was dynamited on 19 August 1813 to evacuate the city the Frenchs. Historians tell that the French general Bartoletti put so much interest in disappear it, in the words of the Canon Huyà, the detonations of the mines made so much din "that until the pavement where we were made shake; We saw the flames of fire and that's when we realized that this sturdy monument had ceased to exist".

Of the castle remained only a pile of rubble, of which it have record in the drawing by Vicens Roig. The building was completed fully demolished in 1825 when the site was allocated to the construction of private houses.

== When Francis I of France was prisoner in ==
The Castell del Patriarca had several towers distributed in different corners of the building. Was in one of these towers where remained for a few days the French king Francis I, when he was taken prisoner by the Spaniards Tercios in the famous battle of Pavia on 24 February 1525. The squadron that moved to the king to Valencia by sea it forced to take refuge in the harbor of Tarragona due to a large weather until, arriving calm, they could continue their journey.

In this regard the presence of the French king the chronicler Blanch account, among other things, an event that was about to cause a conflict. On the third day of the arrival of the king -was Sunday-, he was transferred to the cathedral to hear Mass, and like the Main Mass was over the Archbishop Pedro Cardona ordered that other it officiate. At the end, perhaps because they did not see too much security where he was kept, they moved to other tower of the castle. At nightfall the soldiers who guarded unhappy because it owed them three pays, they asked collects it the Viceroy who commanded them, and they did so violently that set fire and burned the doors. He promised to pay them the next day and the soldiers accepted in spite of receiving only part of the money. Moreover, it was suspected that this kind of revolt organized some supporters of the French king in order to release it. The following Tuesday, between five and six o'clock, the king returned to the cathedral to hear Mass said by a French priest and, once finished the ceremony, was taken to the harbor to board a boat.

== See also ==
- List of missing landmarks in Spain
