= Hotel Internacional (Barcelona) =

Building in the 1888 Universal Exposition

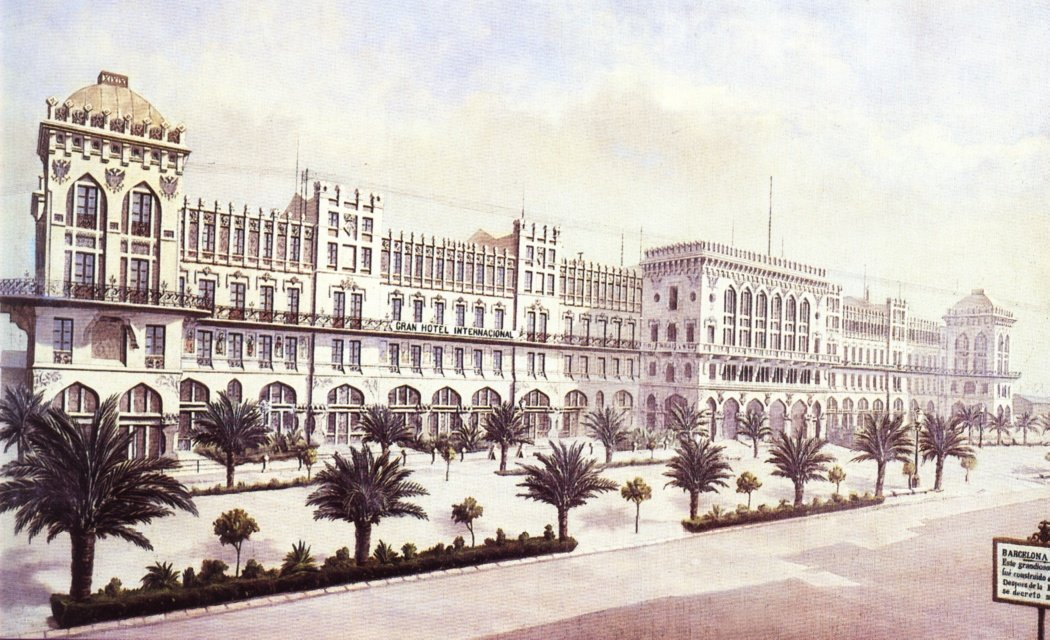
Gran Hotel Internacional appeared in the press in 1888

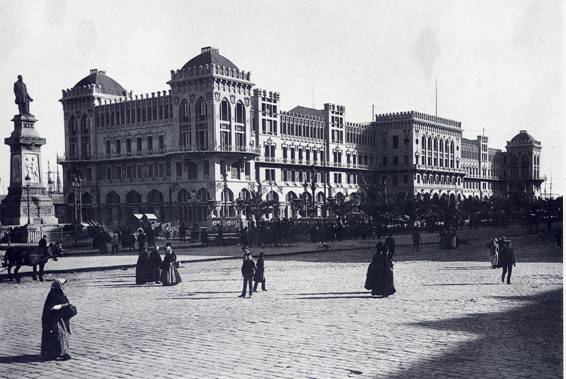
Hotel Internacional

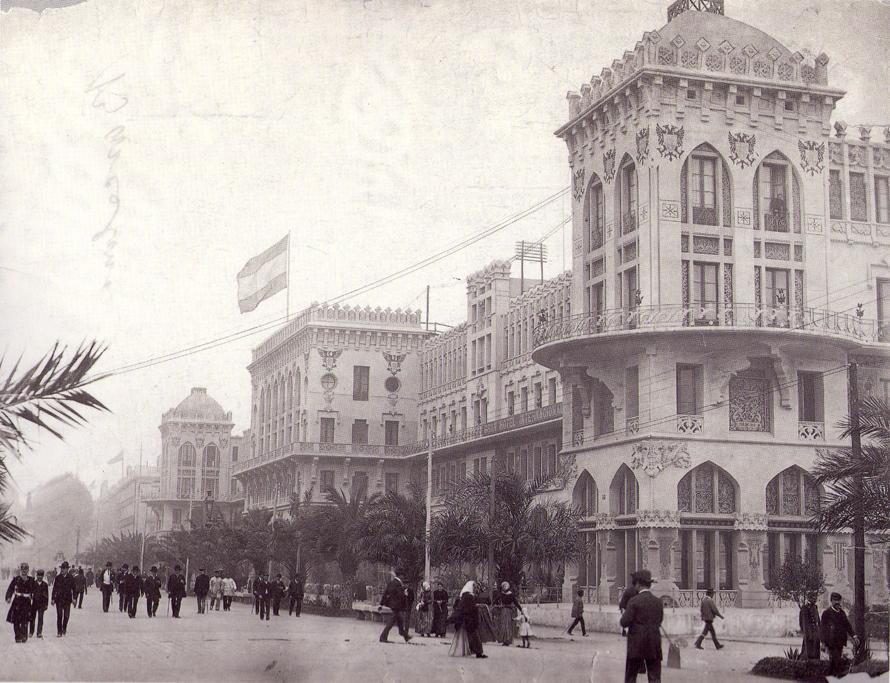
Hotel Internacional

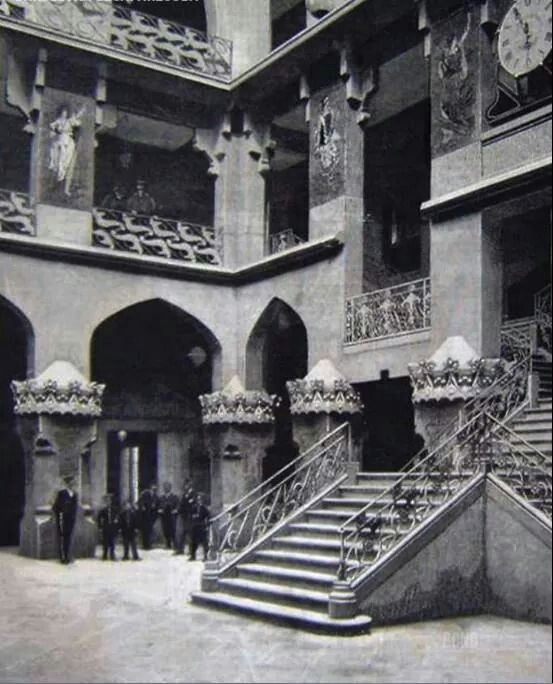
Courtyard and main staircase. 1888

The Hotel Internacional or Gran Hotel Internacional was one of the buildings that the architect Lluís Domènech i Montaner constructed for the Universal Exposition of 1888 of Barcelona (Catalonia).

The hotel was a 5,000 square metres (54,000 sq ft) building that was built in record time of 53 days. It was conceived as a temporary facility to welcome visitors to the exhibition and was demolished once the contest was over.

== The Exhibition Hotel ==
The hotel was built for the Universal Exhibition of 1888, celebrated Barcelona between April 8 and December 9, 1888, receiving a total of 400,000 visitors from all over the world.

The forecast of visitors from outside Barcelona and the lack of proper accommodation represented a disadvantage for the importance of the event, the first of this level that was held in Spain. For this reason it was decided to build a hotel based on the principles of Swiss César Ritz, who conceived a type of accommodation different from the inn or hostel: a cozy place with enough amenities for the client to feel at home.

The hotel was built on reclaimed land in the new Passeig de Colom, in front of the building of the General Captaincy. It stood five stories tall at 150 by 35 metres (492 ft × 115 ft) and occupied a lot of 5,000 square metres (54,000 sq ft). Its capacity was for 2,000 guests in 600 rooms and 30 apartments for large families.

The promoter of the winning work was Ricardo Valentí, but the promotion was transferred to Francesc Manuel Pau and was financed by the entity El Crédito Español.

The construction began in the middle of the month of December 1887 and the 14 of February 1888 the building had been completed, although the interior finishes and decoration lasted until the end of March 1888.

In the middle of January, it was decided to work at night, using eighteen large electric lights, and the personnel brigades were structured which in total were made up of 650 masons and laborers, 100 carpenters and 40 plasterers.

The official inauguration occurred on April 5, 1888 and opened to the public on 12 April.

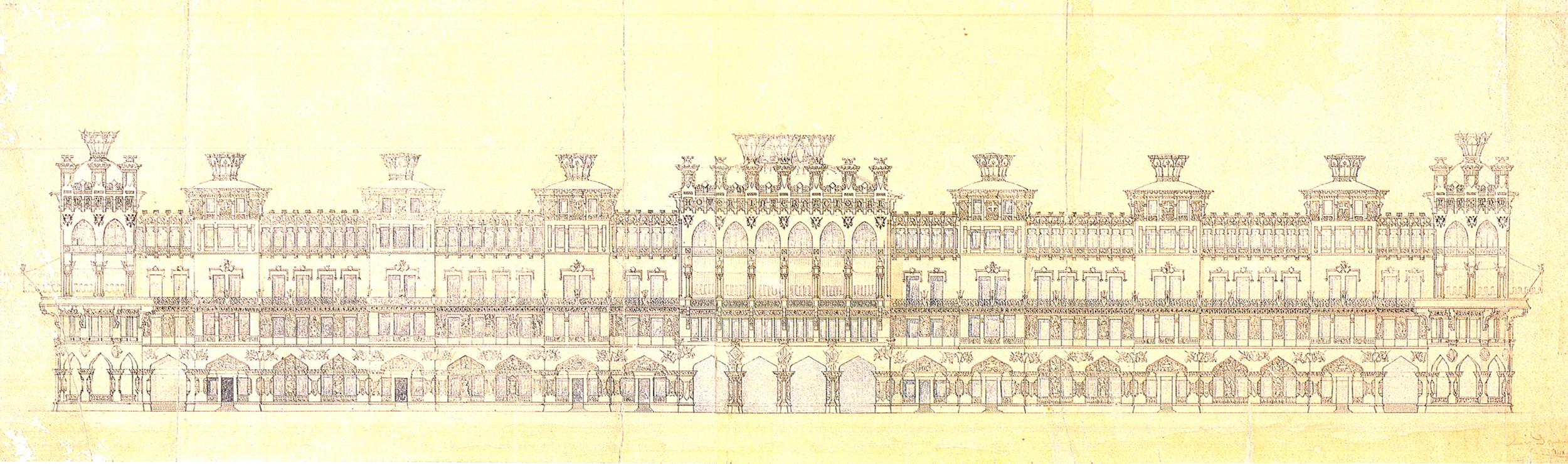
Facade of the International Hotel

== Demolition ==
The building had a great reception among the citizens of Barcelona and a good part of the intellectual sector, which considered it a work of art representative of the new architecture.

However, it was built to be temporary. The hotel was built on land temporarily ceded by the Port of Barcelona, that made a permanent structure not viable. In addition, the building had no foundation, as it was seated on a metal structure made expressly to provide stability. Finally, the materials used in the construction were intended for a limited duration. Although the duration of the construction was predetermined, a movement to save the building was organized, which started even before the building's completion.

At the end of the Exhibition, there were several lawsuits to save the building involving the local minister with an offer of sale of the building. The Spanish Courts, in a very tense session, confirmed the demolition order.

The demolition began on May 1, 1889, just over a year after its inauguration.

== See also ==
- List of missing landmarks in Spain
