= Palace of the Viceroy (Barcelona) =

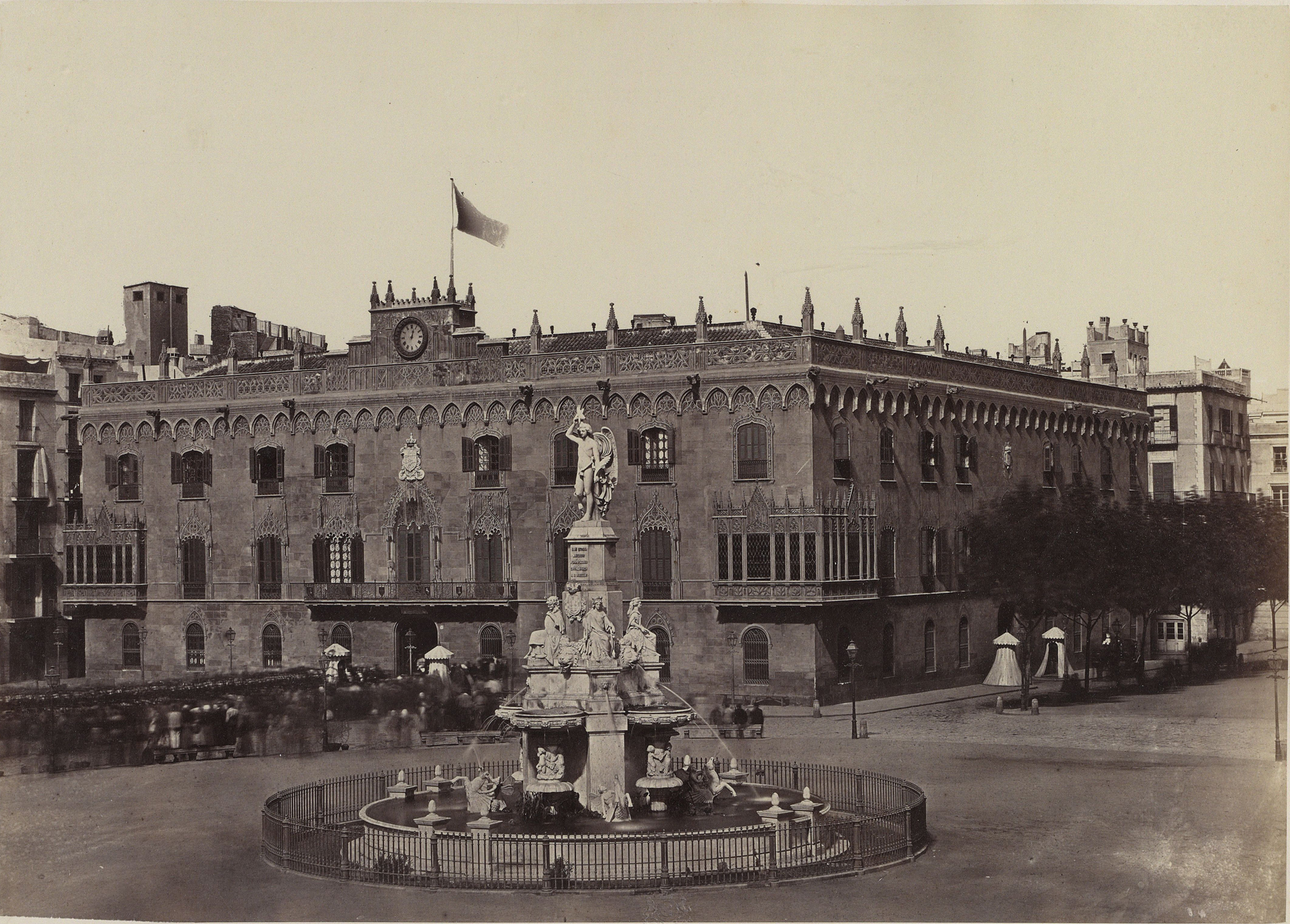
The Royal Palace of Barcelona in 1860

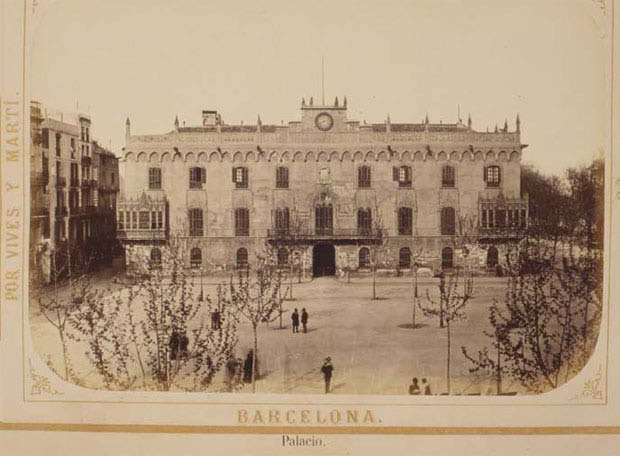
The Royal Palace around 1850

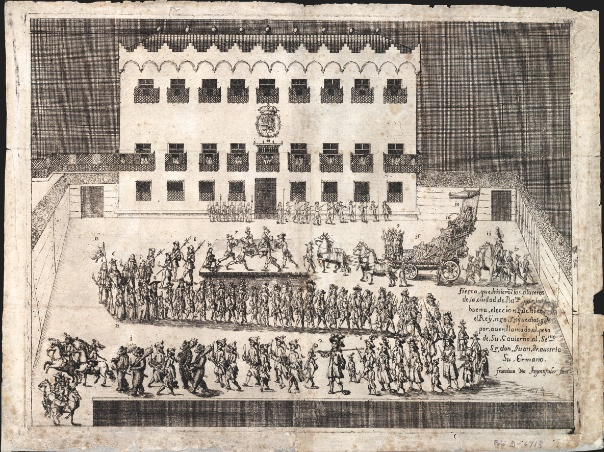
The Viceroy's Palace in 1677

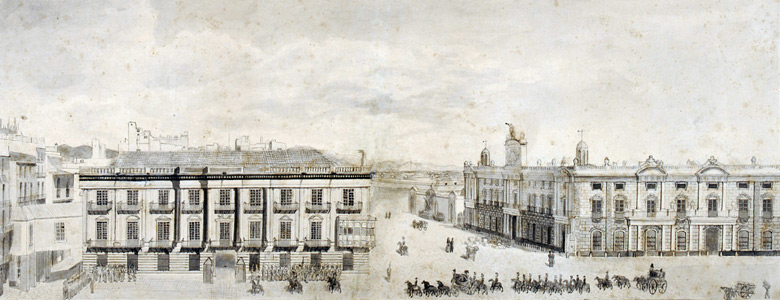
The Royal Palace around 1800

The Palace of the Viceroy (Catalan: Palau del Virrei, Spanish: Palacio del Virrey) was a palace in Barcelona, Catalonia, Spain. During the time it was a royal residence, it was known as the Royal Palace (Catalan: Palau Reial, Spanish: Palacio Real)), and its popular name was Hala dels Draps (Catalan for ″Hall of the Cloths″). It was located in the Pla de Palau, in the center of the Ciutat Vella district of Barcelona.

The building had its origin in a woolen port warehouse of medieval times, until it was converted into a palace in 1652 and became the official residence of the viceroys of Catalonia. It became the Royal Palace and residence of the Spanish royal family in Barcelona in 1844. It was destroyed by a fire in 1875.

== History ==
=== Middle Ages ===
The palace has its origins in the ‘Porxo del Forment’, a wheat warehouse constructed in 1314. Next to it, a cloth market was built in 1389, which was also known as the ‘Hala dels Draps’. The buildings were merged in 1514 and a floor was added to the building which served as an arsenal.

=== Palace of the Viceroy ===
King Philip IV confiscated the building in 1652 and purposed it to serve as the new residence of the Viceroy of Catalonia (also known as Lieutenant) moving from the Palau del Lloctinent. By order of Viceroy Vicente Gonzaga Doria a new palace was constructed between 1668 and 1688. The architect was Josep de la Concepció, a Carmelite friar, who designed a baroque building. The palace had a quadrangular plan with a central courtyard, three levels with balconies and a facade with Gothic elements. Of the interior, the main hall, called Sala de Festes, stood out, with a rectangular floor plan and two floors high. In 1700, by initiative of viceroy Prince George of Hesse-Darmstadt a connection was added to the Santa Maria del Mar church. During the War of the Spanish Succession Archduke Charles of Habsburg was installed as king of Spain in the building in 1705. Three years later, he married Elisabeth Christine of Brunswick-Wolfenbüttel in the Santa Maria del Mar in 1708. They resided in the palace until 1711, when they left for Vienna in Austria. With the Nueva Planta decrees the office of the viceroy was abolished, and the palace became the residence of the Captain General of Catalonia. The palace got a façade in a neoclassical style in 1771, designed by the architect Juan Miguel de Roncali.

=== Royal Palace ===
The palace became the royal palace in 1844, when the Captain General moved his residence to a former convent. During this time, the palace was reconstructed in neo-Gothic style. During the various visits to Barcelona the Spanish royal family stayed in the palace. During the First Spanish Republic it was the seat of a court. The palace was destroyed by a fire in 1875 and was not rebuilt. It was not until 1919, that a new royal residence was erected in Barcelona, the Palau Reial de Pedralbes. The current royal residence in Barcelona is the Palace of Albéniz in the Joan Maragall Gardens on the Montjuïc mountain, which was designed for the 1929 International Exposition in the exhibition site itself.

== Bibliography ==
- Art de Catalunya 3: Urbanisme, arquitectura civil i industrial (in Catalan). Barcelona: Edicions L'isard. 1998. ISBN 84-89931-04-6.
- Barral i Altet, Xavier; Beseran, Pere; Canalda, Sílvia; Guardià, Marta; Jornet, Núria (2000). Guia del Patrimoni Monumental i Artístic de Catalunya, vol. 1 (in Catalan). Barcelona: Pòrtic. ISBN 84-7306-947-1.

== See also ==
- List of missing landmarks in Spain
