= Edificio Castromil =

Eclectic style building in the Galician region of Spain

The Edificio Castromil or Castromil Building, previously known as café Quiqui-Bar in Santiago de Compostela, was a building of Eclectic style demolished in 1975 and was located in the Praza de García Prieto.

The Coruñan architect Rafael González Villar designed it in 1922 along with Antonio Alfonso Viana, who coordinated the work in 1926. Its promoters were the Compostelan partners Manuel Ramallo Gómez and Ángel Gontán Sánchez, in order to destine it to café-bar and restaurant.

The Official College of Architects of Galicia it pronounced, asking that it declared Historical and Artistic Monument, after being expropriated by the City Hall of Santiago de Compostela for its demolition in the year 1974. Nevertheless, the following year would be demolished the building to build an underground car park, imposing the criterion of the municipal corporation.

== History ==
The now known as Praza de Galicia in Santiago de Compostela, suffered during the 20th century major changes, with the demolition of old buildings and building new ones. Even today continues the praza in search of its identity within the city of Santiago.

At the beginning of the 20th century Praza de García Prieto was the meeting place for the traveler who arrived and the main access point to the city. Those who journeyed there could see a corner of the square Pazo da Inquisición, which was demolition in 1913 to raise in its place in what would be known as "Teatro Royalty" in 1921, suffering the same fate as the previous years after. Finally in 1930 it opened the current Hotel Compostela that occupies that corner of the Praza de Galicia today.

In 1926 was built, in what was then the Praza García Prieto, a building of Ecleptic style, which would house initially known as Quiqui-Bar. As from that date, with the construction of the building.

Financial problems led to its transfer a few years later, due to the high cost that supposed the maintenance of the business. In 1929 acquired as facilities to the company Castromil, which would establish the headquarters of the bus company, holding this function until its demolition in 1975. This building served as a transition between the monumentality of the historic area and the modern buildings of the new zone. The property was inseparable part of the ensnared urban and enjoyed a very good consideration of both the citizens and among the architects of the city.

Instead, in the early 1970s, the City Hall wanted to build an underground car parking, thinking in revitalize the city of Santiago. To carry out it decided to overturn the Castromil landmark building, several architects of Santiago defined as "the best architectural work of public use that had the ensanche" or as "the most representative building of the architecture of the early 20th century in Santiago de Compostela".

The proposal based on building the parking car around the building without demolish it, respecting its pillars, was unsuccessful. Nor did the attempt to declare Historical and Artistic Monument the Castromil building, meeting with the rejection of the Provincial Commission of Fine Arts.

In September 1975 the pike began the collapse of the singular building amid strong controversy unleashed in all citizens areas, mostly favorable to its conservation. The demolition of Castromil was one of many examples of demolitions of iconic buildings in cities and towns in Galicia since the 1960s. But the controversy raised by the Castromil set a benchmark in awareness of the historical heritage of Galicia and its conservation.

== Process of the demolition ==
The building was demolished between the months of September and October 1975 following a controversial process that is described below:

The Official College of Architects of Galicia, after knowing of the decision of the City Council to overturn the Castromil to build an underground parking car, grant request on 18 January 1974 of the General Directorate of Fine Arts, Commissioner of the artistic heritage that is declared monument, besides performing the necessary steps at the General Directorate of Architecture (expropriators of the property) for its conservation. Promote a campaign in the media in defense of the building.

Appear in the press the first articles in favor of the non-collapse in March 1974. Days later comes to light the institution of proceedings for a declaration of the monument, on 16 April 1974. The Directorate General of Fine Arts called to the City Hall of Compostela in the process of audience. The municipal plenary session approved unanimously oppose the pretensions of the Directorate General of Fine Arts, based on a detailed report read in the meeting by the mayor.

Are some articles and commentaries in the press against the Castromil Building in April 1974. Consequently, signed a letter written by 48 Spanish architects opposed to the demolition of the Castromil building on May 22, 1974, proposing a national contest of ideas related to the project Praza de Xelmírez.

In May and June 1974 arises a war of comments, notes and press releases on whether or not the collapse. The Provintial Commission of Fine Arts qualifies negatively the declaration file of Monument on July 12, 1974. The mayor of Santiago manifest the next day that the Castromil building will be demolished.

The Directorate General of Fine Arts takes a resolution on September 9, 1974, lapsing the declaration file of Monument (showing in the press on 22 September).

The September 20, 1974 the Compostelan permanent municipal fix in previous resolution and unanimously agree to go to the Directorate General of Architecture strongly requesting that start as soon as the works of demolition. It also agreed to submit to the full in the City Council the draft.

The pike began in September 1975 to demolish the landmark building, which harbored in its begins the Quiqui-Bar and later the headquarters of the company Castromil. Are many who expressed their regret:

must be noted, painfully, two of the most serious heritage attacks that suffered Compostela in the last century (...) The first, and perhaps therefore the most overlooked, is the bloody demolition of the Baroque Casa da Inquisición, work by Casas Novoa (1729) destined until 1834 to host the disastrous institution (...) but it is, without any doubt, the disappearance of the popular Castromil Building the most unfortunate aggression that even today survives in the memory of the Compostelan.

— Costa Buján, Pablo (2013); Urban Development and morphological changes. . Santiago de Compostela 1778-1950, pages 149-150.

== Architectural style ==
Defined under the Expressionist Eclectic style near to the modernisme, the building was designed in the year 1922 by the architect Rafael González Villar into a Galician canons of fashion of that time.

== See also ==
- List of missing landmarks in Spain
