= Iglesia de San Pedro Mártir (Calatayud) =

Demolished Mudéjar church in Calatayud, Aragon

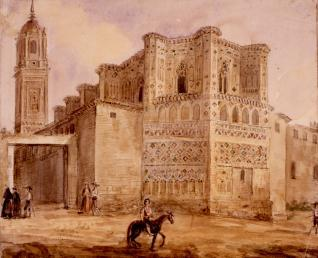
Engraving by Valentín Carderera dated 1820–1880 of the back facade. Lázaro Galdiano Museum.

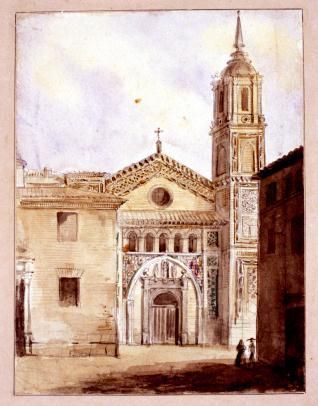
Front facade

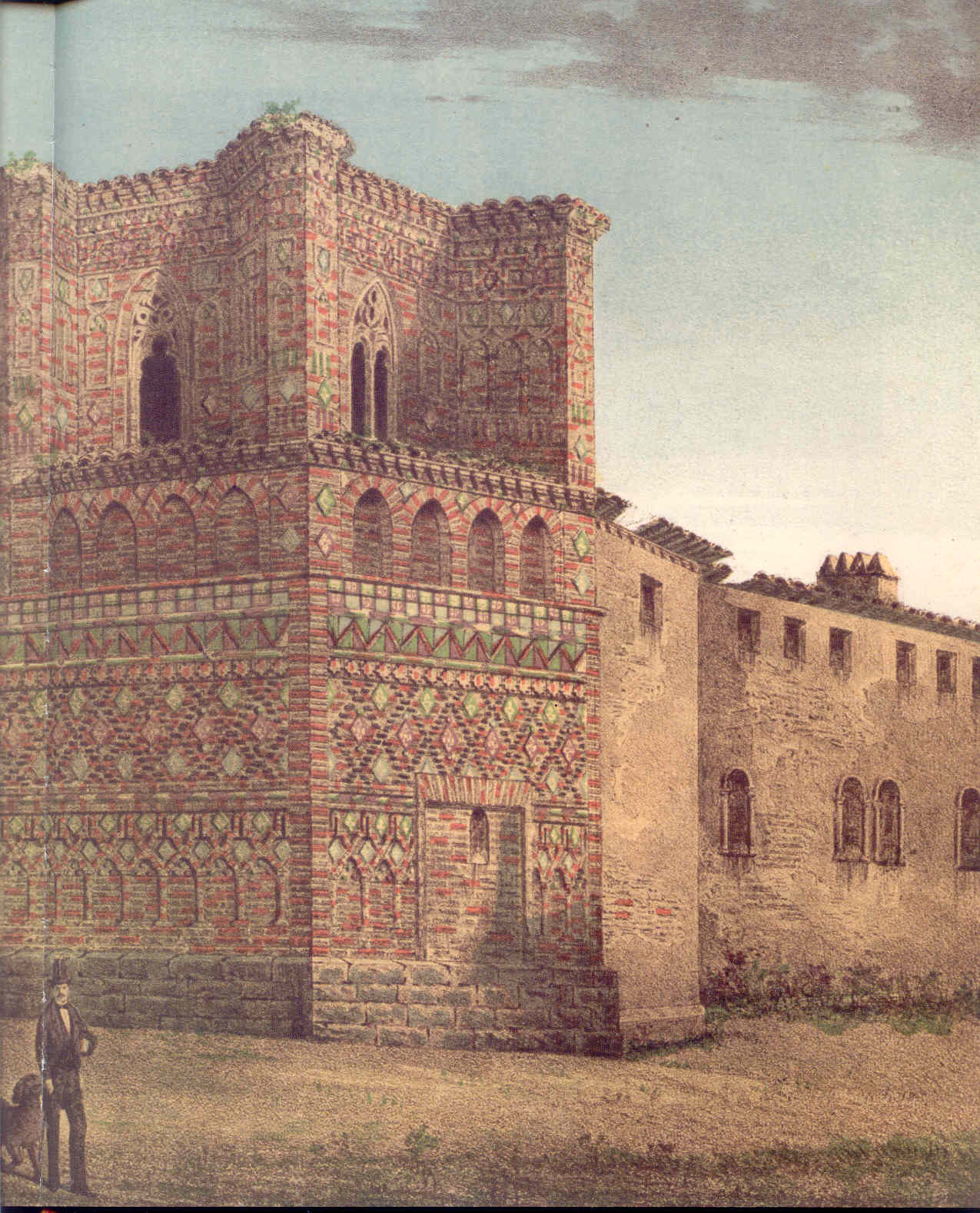
Detail of the back facade

The Iglesia de San Pedro Mártir was a Mudéjar church located in Calatayud (Aragon). It was demolished in 1856.

== See also ==
- List of missing landmarks in Spain
