= Parque del Centenario =

Coordinates: 36°06′26″N 5°26′00″W

- Interactive map of Parque del Centenario
- Location: Algeciras, Gilbralter

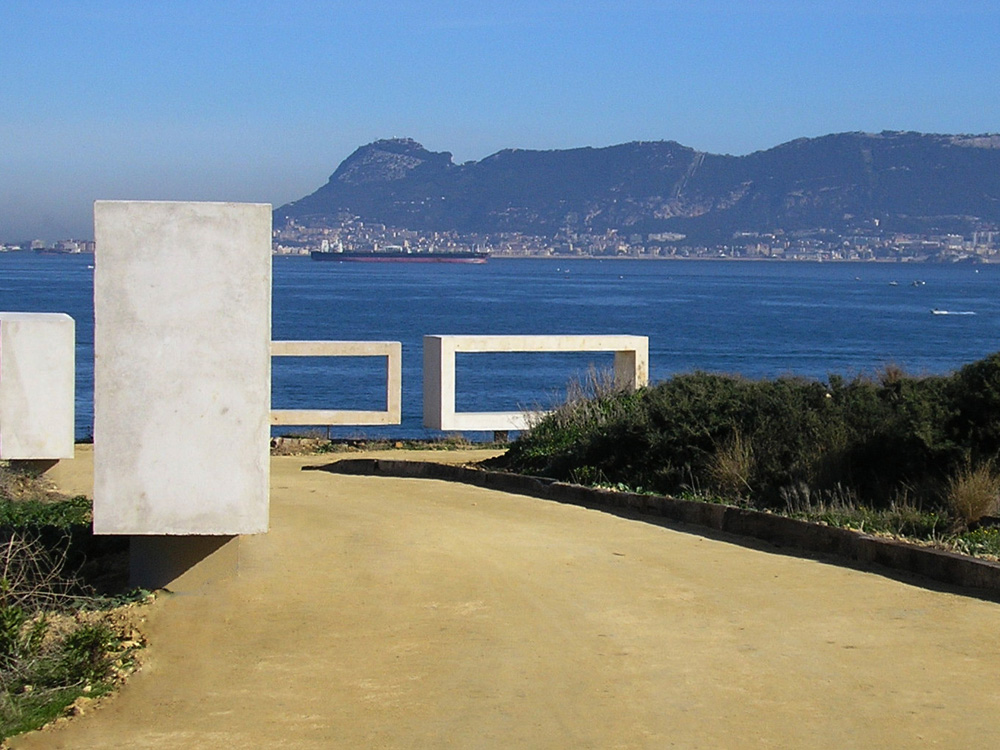

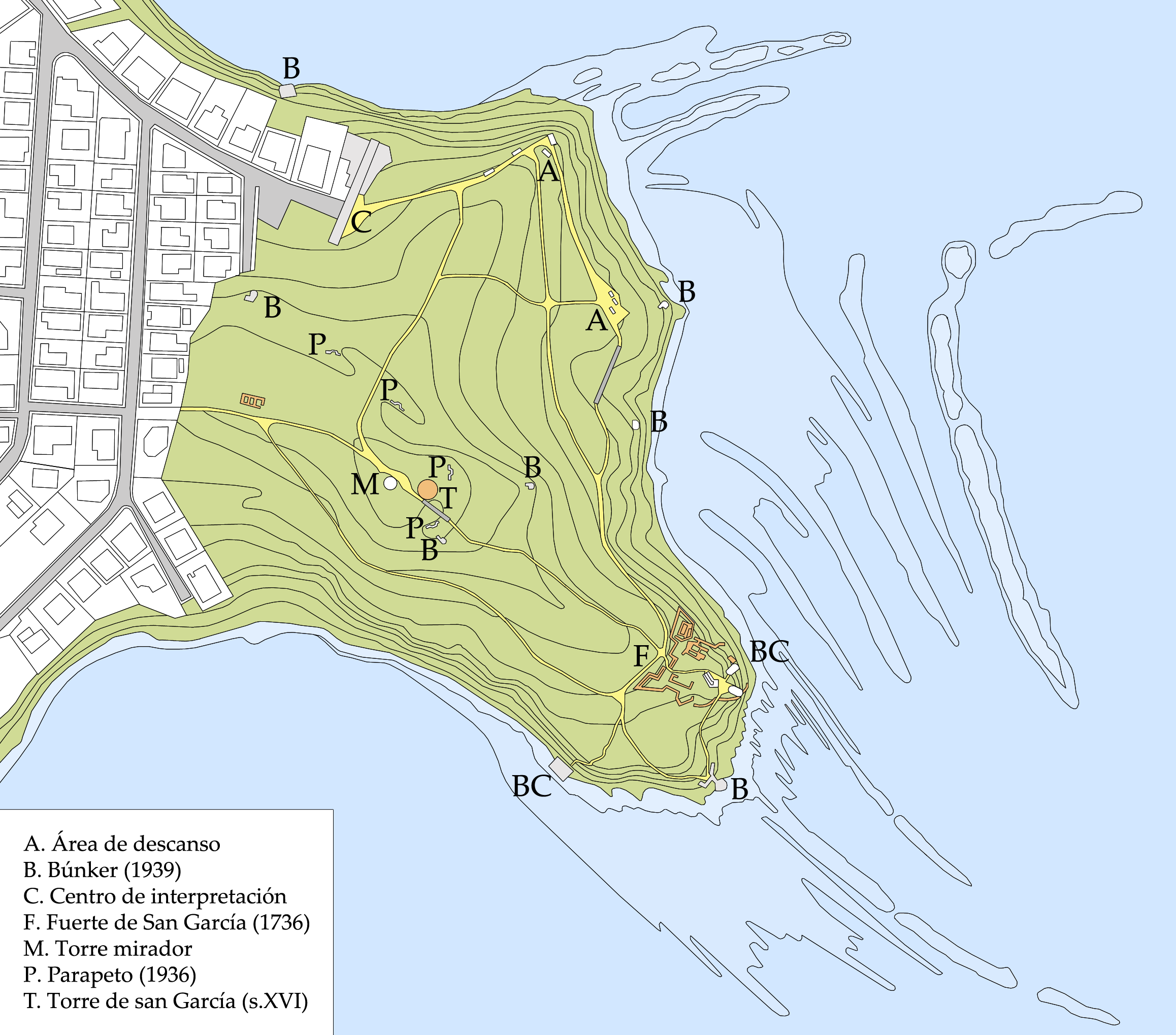

The Parque del Centenario (Centennial Park) is a park located in Algeciras. It was established in 2007 thanks to the collaboration between the Port Authority of the Bay of Algeciras and City Hall to mark the hundredth anniversary of the Algeciras Conference. The park covers more than 100,000 m2, and lies on the ruins of the old Fuerte de San García, destroyed around 1811 by the British troops on the occasion of the independence war between Spain and France. Surrounding the park are several developments of villas and two beaches, San Garcia and the Chinarral.
