= Gate of Bibarrambla =

City gate in Granada, Spain

Coordinates: 37°10′30″N 3°35′22″W

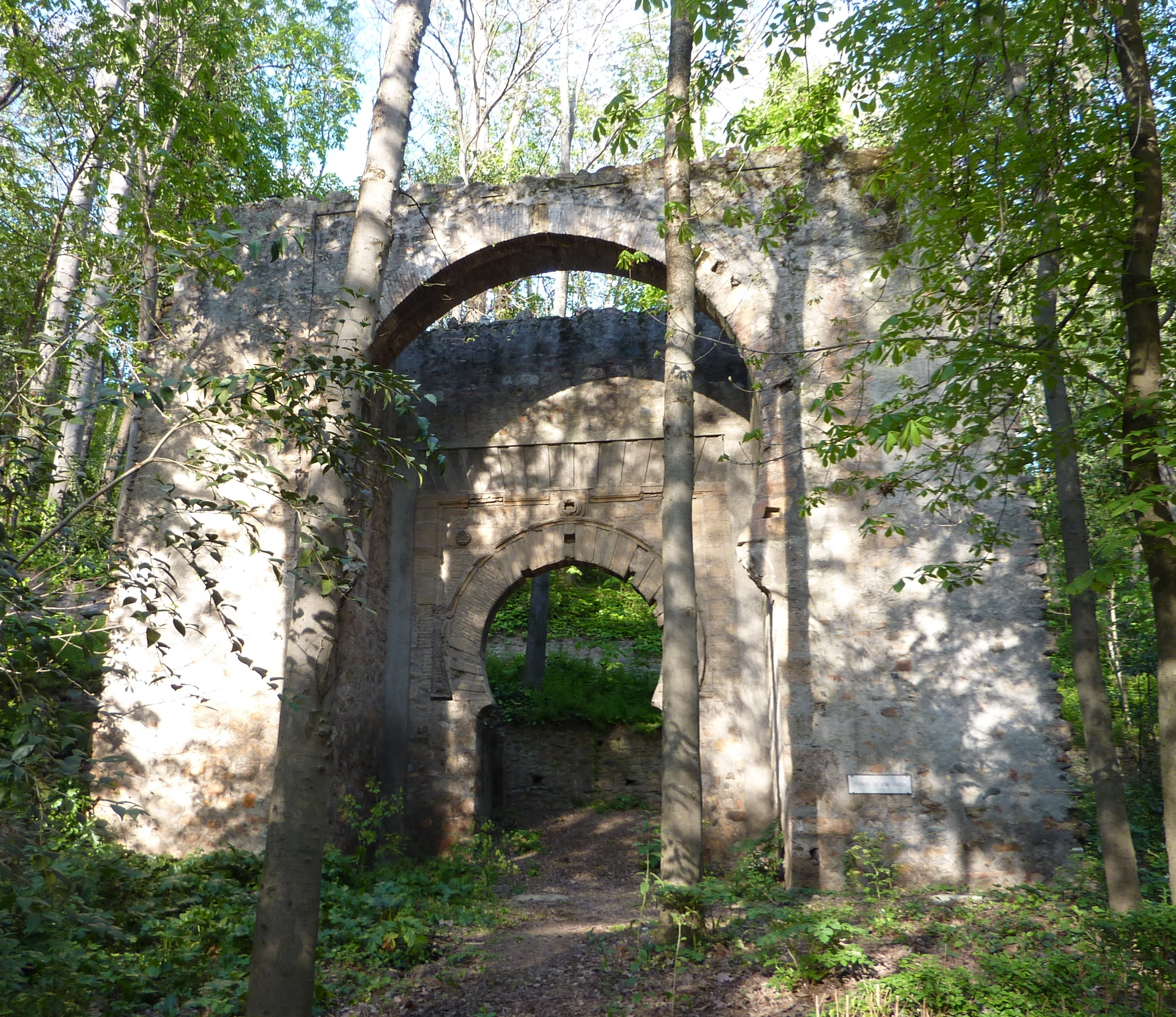
The partially reconstructed gate as it appears today in the woods near the Alhambra

The Gate of Bibarrambla or Bibrambla (Spanish: Puerta de Bibrambla), also known as Puerta del Arenal or Arch of the Ears (Spanish: Arco de las Orejas), was a former city gate in Granada, Spain. Built in the 14th century during the Nasrid period, it stood at the corner of a public square of the same name, Plaza de Bibarrambla. The gate was demolished between 1873 and 1884. In 1935, it was partially reconstructed by Leopoldo Torres Balbás in the woods outside the Alhambra, where it stands today.

== Etymology ==
The Spanish name Bibrambla or Bibarrambla comes from the gate's Arabic name, Bab al-Ramla, meaning "Gate of Sand" or "Gate of the Sandbank". The gate was later nicknamed "Arch of the Ears" (Spanish: Arco de las Orejas). Local legend suggests that this name is linked to the tradition of taking the ears (and other body parts) of executed criminals and hanging them for display. Another theory suggests that during the reign of Philip IV of Spain, a floating tablao carrying too many people had sunk. The ears of dead women were mutilated in an effort to remove their earrings, giving the Gate of the Ears its name.

== History ==
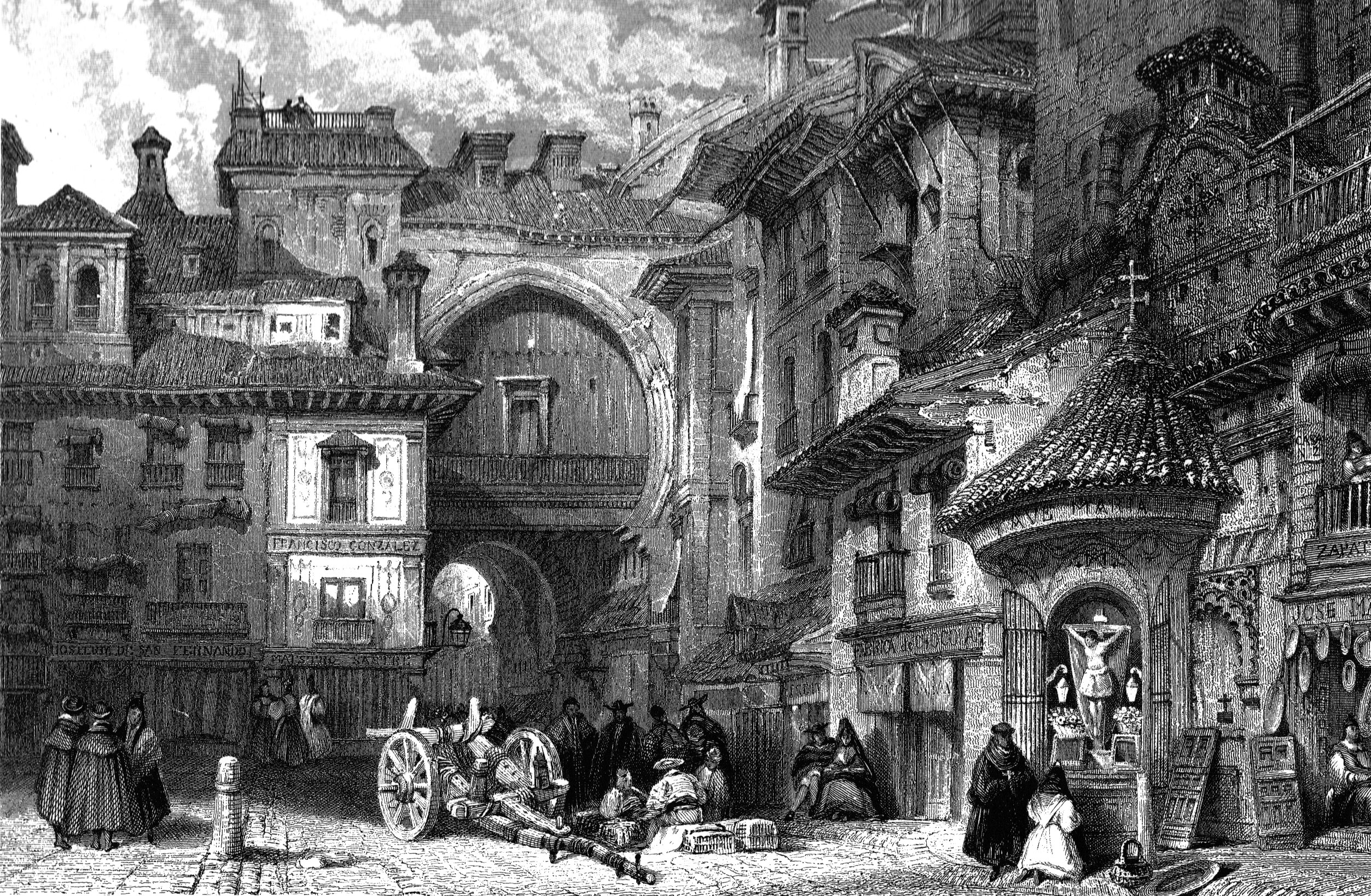
A line engraving by James Baylis Allen based on a drawing by Scottish painter David Roberts, showing the front side of the gate as it stood circa 1830

The original gate's construction is attributed to the Nasrid period (13th to 15th centuries) and credited to Sultan Yusuf I (r. 1333–1354).

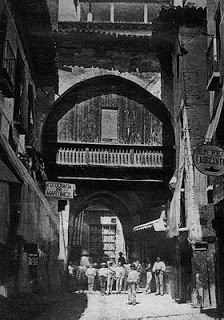
This photograph of the gate taken around 1870, showing its poor condition prior to demolition

The gate was built of rammed earth, with some elements made in stone. Topped by a tower 10 or 11 meters high, the structure was a monumental gate heavily protected by a square tower and three arches. The exterior had a large horseshoe arch, made with voussoirs of stone from Sierra Elvira. It was crowned by a balcony where, according to legend, the ears of criminals were nailed. The gate also had a machicolation, closed in 1507, forming what would become a chapel. As it was not primarily a military or defensive building, it had a more elegant line.

In the 19th century the gate was designated a national monument. It was demolished between 1873 and 1884 on the orders of the city council, which wished to implement modernization projects. A campaign to preserve the gate was supported by the Spanish president of the time but failed to dissuade the council. The gate's former appearance was documented in part thanks to the work of Scottish artist David Roberts.

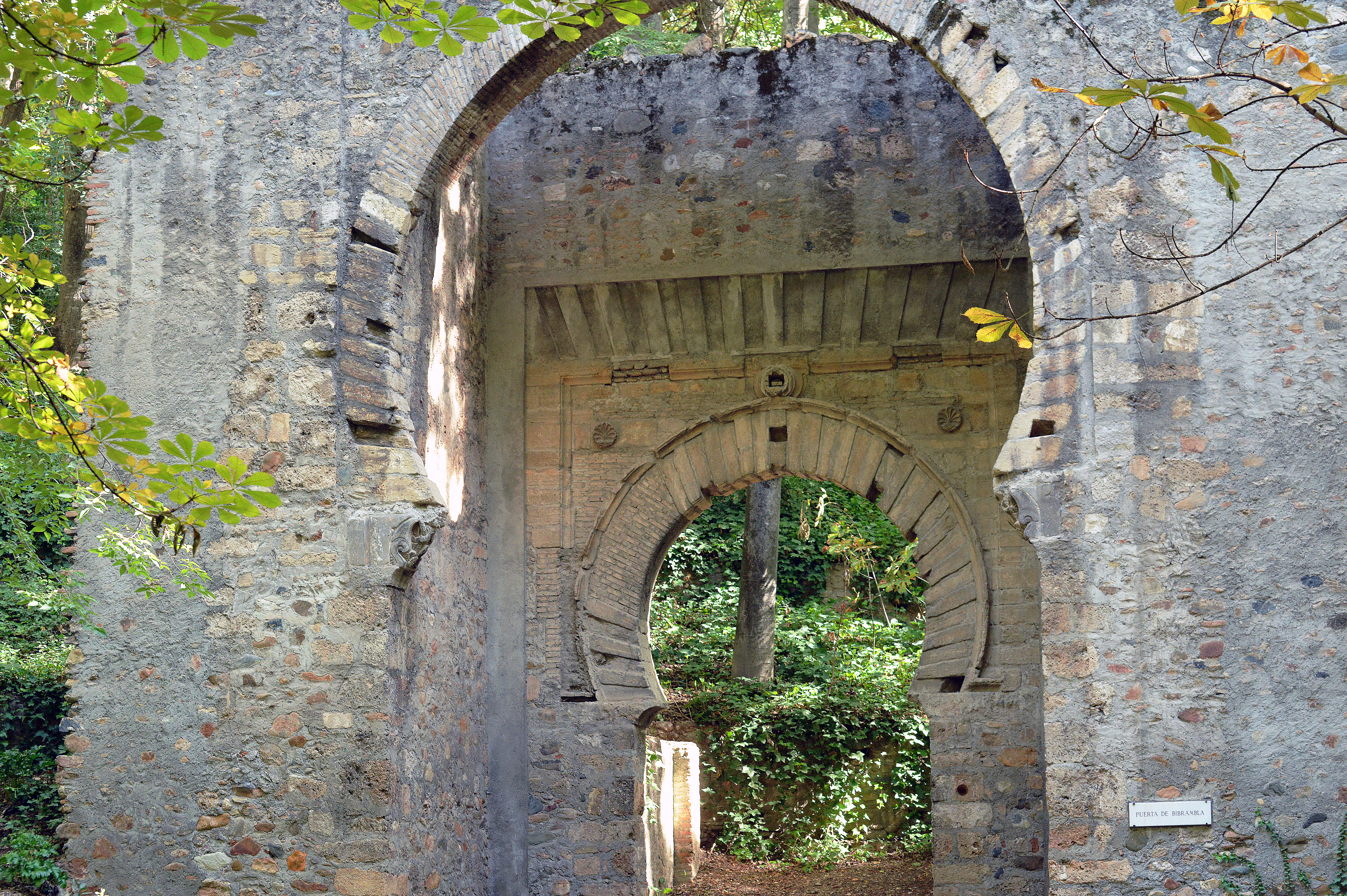
The reconstructed gate from 1935

After demolition, the remaining pieces of the gate were stored in the Archeological Museum of Granada. In 1933 or 1935, Leopoldo Torres Balbás, the curator-architect in charge of the Alhambra's conservation, executed a partial reconstruction of the gate. The reconstructed structure was placed in a new location in the Alhambra Woods, on the Sabika Hill leading to the Alhambra, where it remains today. Unfortunately, many of its original features were still lost.

== Painting ==
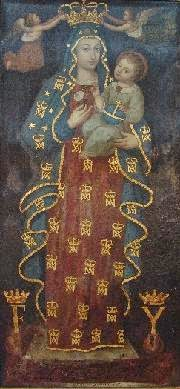
Painting of the Nuestra Señora de la Rosa (Our Lady of the Rose) which was placed in the gate. Currently is located in the Museum of Fine Arts of Granada.

A Catholic Monarch hung a painting on the second arch of the gate: Our Lady of the Rose, named after the flower that the child is holding. Its sides are decorated with the initials of the kings. The kings may have placed the canvas there during one of their visits to the city. A grandstand was also installed under the voussoirs of the first arc in 1507. The chapel was closed and left a hole that exposed the image of the Virgin to the plaza. This was common in many Spanish gates that contained such paintings. The purpose was to Christianize the main elements of Muslim architecture and show visitors the new religion of the newly conquered city. Originally, the painting followed the schemes of the late Spanish-Flemish school. Its Gothicism is most noticeable in the angels, smaller in size and with angular wings. By contrast, the faces of the Virgin and Child favored greater naturalism and remarkable sweetness.

== See also ==
- List of missing landmarks in Spain
