= Palacio de Ripalda =

Demolished Spanish building in Valencia

Coordinates: 39.4771°N 0.3665°W

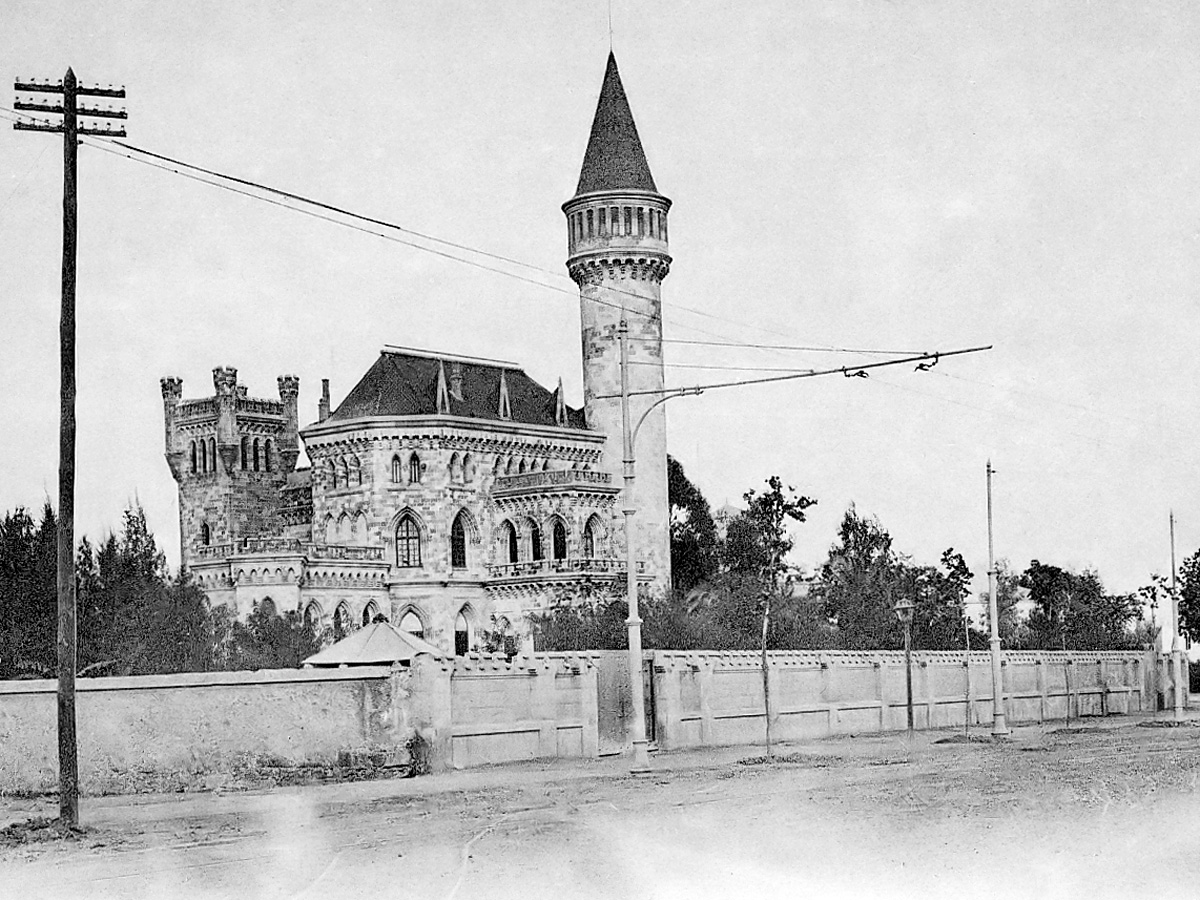
Palacio de Ripalda

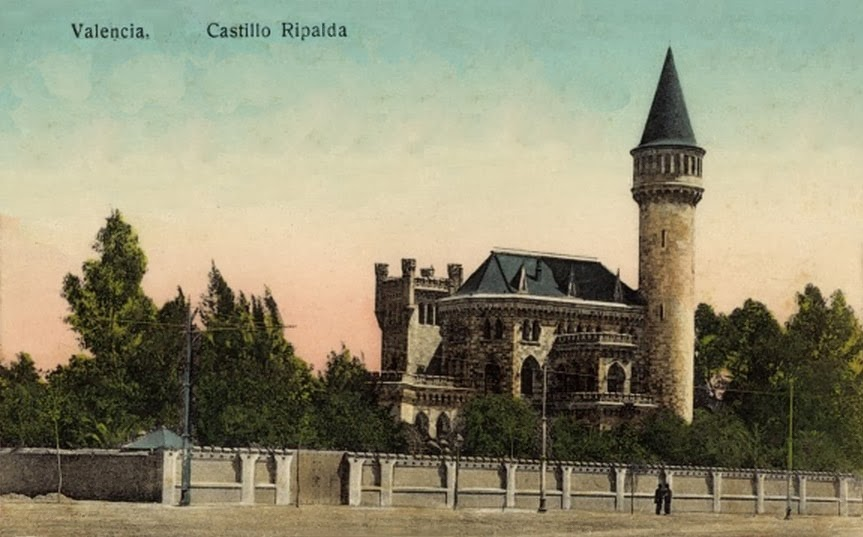
Palacio de Ripalda

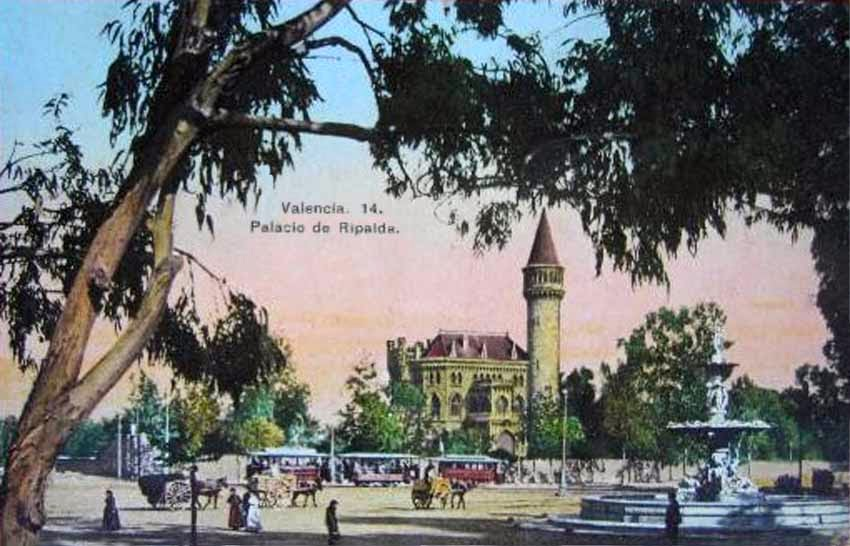
Tram passing in front of the Palacio de Ripalda, and also showing the existing Fountain de las Cuatro Estaciones.

The Palacio de Ripalda was a building (now defunct) of Eclectic style designed in 1889 by Spanish architect Joaquín María Arnau Miramón in the Spanish city of Valencia.

== History ==
The architect Joaquín María Arnau Miramón from 1889 began an intense professional relationship with María Josefa Paulín y de la Peña, widow Countess of Ripalda, who commissioned him for important works, among which was the project of a palace for herself on the Paseo de la Alameda of Valencia. It was finished in 1891. In 1936, under the Republic, the palace was used as headquarters of the Ministry of Commerce.

In successive years, the building became a romantic landscape of Valencia on the outside, but inside it was suffering the natural vicissitudes of a property. It became very difficult to maintain.

This palace was one of the icons of the city until it was demolished in 1967. Today, on the site occupied by the palace is a building known as La Pagoda, next to the Jardines de Monforte.

=== Demolition ===
The City Council, led by Mayor Adolfo Rincón de Arellano, wanted to raise in Benimamet grounds facilities for a new and modern Trade Fair. And for resources it had decided to demolish the old Fair, another building of the 1930s. In line with this operation, the owners of the Palacio de Ripalda also urged the demolition of the old palace. Everything was accomplished in a few months. The demolition raised scarcely any complaints in the press. The new Fair was a priority.

On the site of Llano del Real, the Valencian businessman of hospitality, José Meliá, thought to build a luxury hotel of revolutionary design; it would be modeled after another raised in Florida. But the project was not carried out, due to financial constraints. Two modern buildings - Jardines del Real and la Pagoda - ended up getting up on the site of the Fair and the palace of the Marchioness of Ripalda.

It was rumored that the palace was taken, stone by stone, to the United States, to be reconstructed. But there is no proof to support this.

== Features ==
The Palacio de Ripalda was a peculiar, castle-like building, with a romantic perspective unprecedented in Valencia.

== Bibliography ==
- Benito Goerlich, D. La arquitectura del eclecticismo en Valencia: vertientes de la arquitectura valenciana entre 1875 y 1925. Ayuntamiento de Valencia, 1992
