= Fuerte de San García =

Coordinates: 36°06′22″N 5°25′54″W

San Garcia Fort
- Fuerte de San García (Spanish)
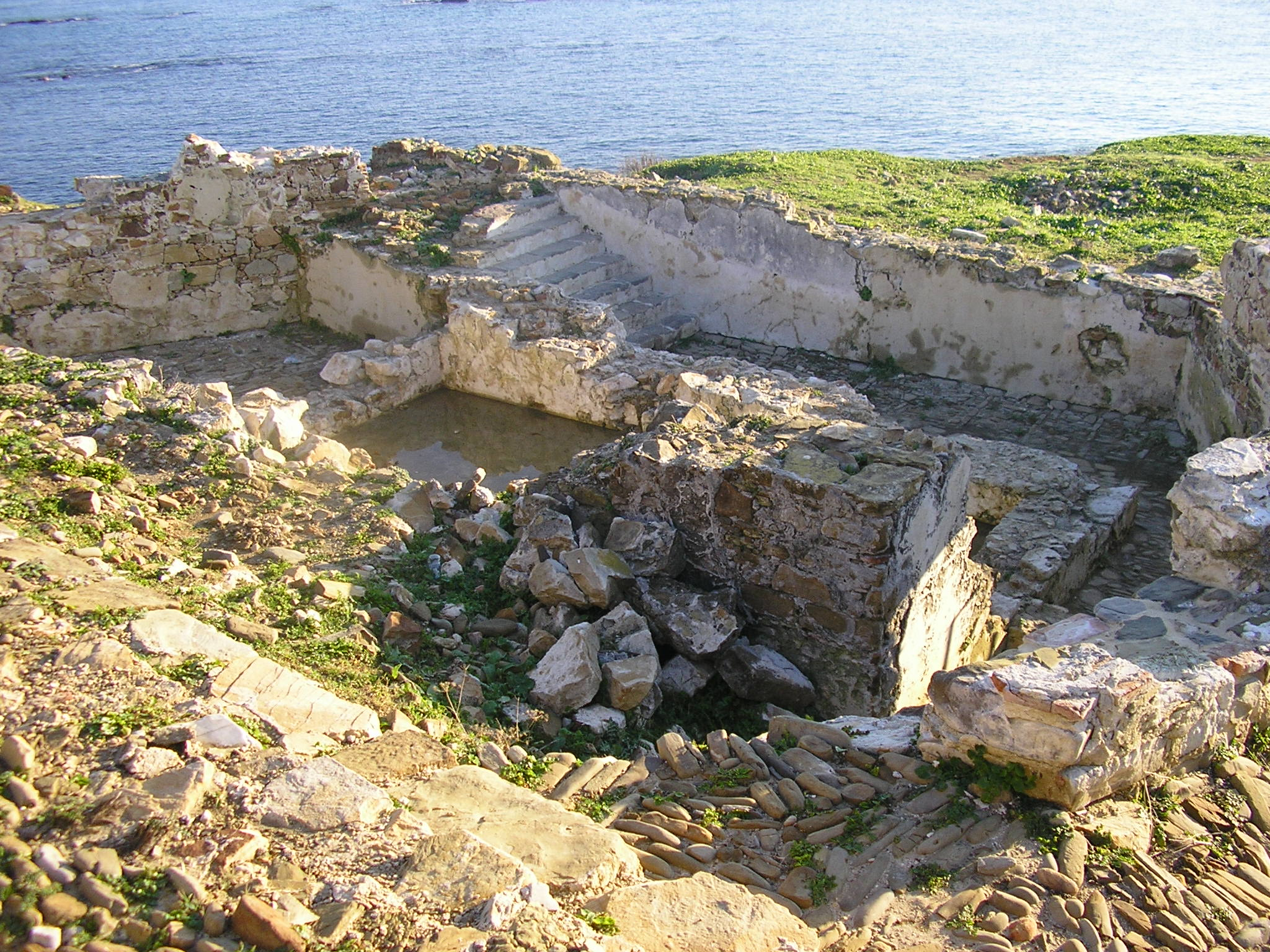
- the remains of the Fuerte de San García

- Location within Province of Cádiz Location within Spain
- Location: Algeciras, Spain

History
- Built: 1730s

Spanish Cultural Heritage
- Official name: Fuerte de San García
- Type: Non-movable
- Criteria: Monument

Fuerte de San García was a fort in Algeciras, Spain, It was built in the 1730s and destroyed in 1811 to deny it to the French. Today all that remains are the foundation and base ruins, in the Parque del Centenario, but it is a registered Bien de Interés Cultural landmark

The Spanish fortifications around Gibraltar were destroyed in 1810 to deny their use by Napoleon's forces. the fortifications around the bay were removed by Portuguese sailors and this was only shortly before the French cavalry arrived in nearby San Roque. The main Spanish lines were destroyed by Colonel Sir Charles Holloway on 14 February 1810. Following the main explosion other towers were destroyed and volunteers took away the rubble.
