= Puerta de Toledo (Zaragoza) =

City gate in Zaragoza, Spain

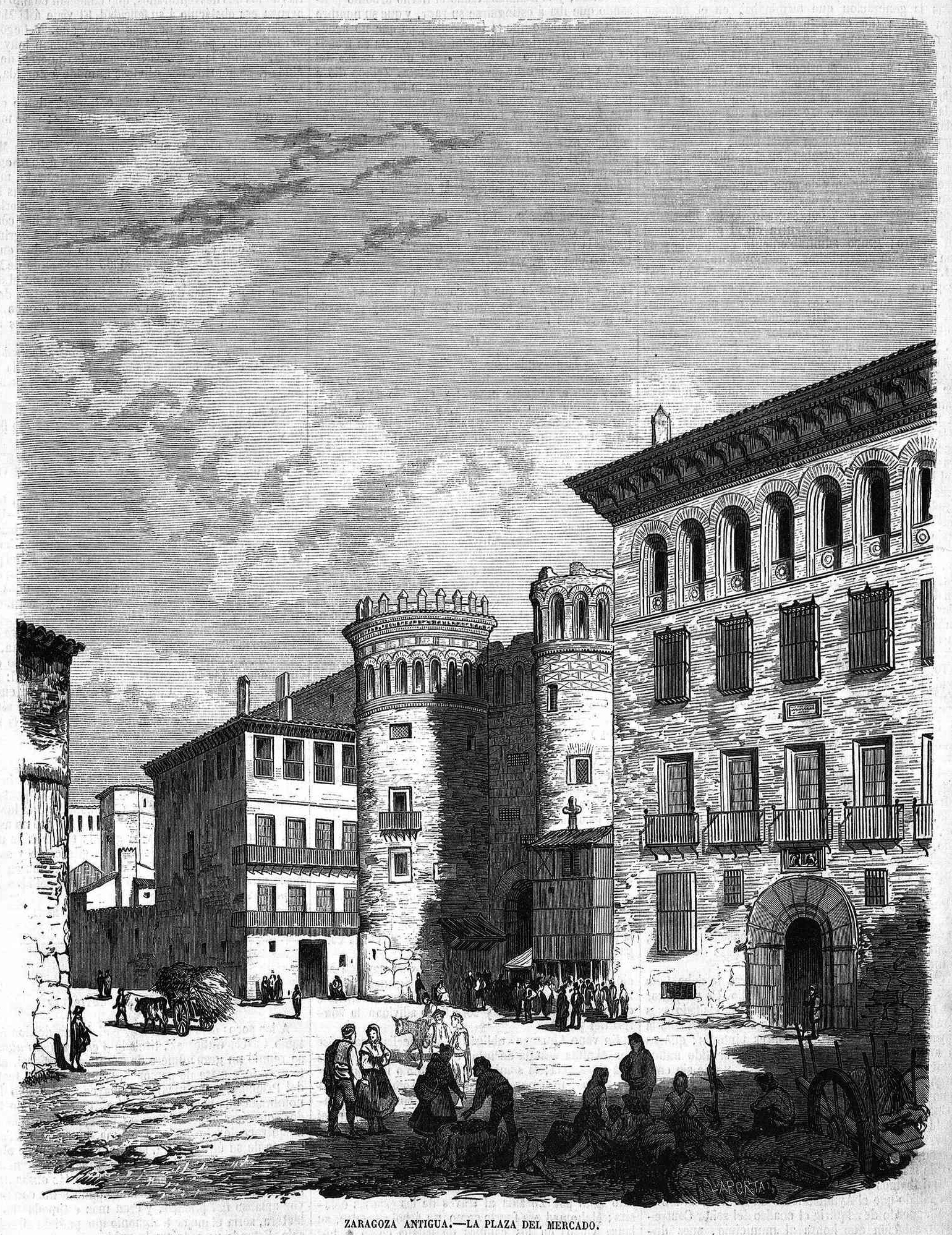
Puerta de Toledo and the Market Square in Zaragoza. Drawing published by the 19th century Spanish magazine El Museo Universal.

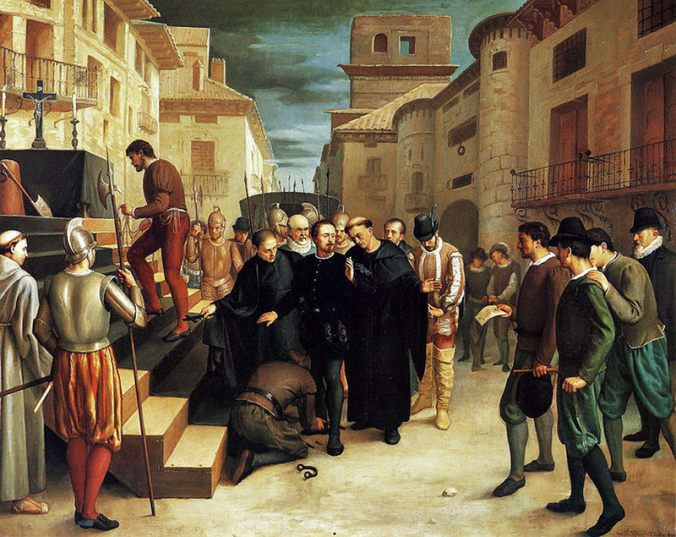
Last moments of Juan de Lanuza. The painting represents the last days of the Chusticia of Aragon Juan de Lanuza y Urrea (1564–1591). At behind is the Puerta de Toledo.

The Puerta de Toledo was one of the twelves city gates that had the Walls of Zaragoza. It was near of San Juan de los Panetes front of the rear of the current Central Market, in the area where were until a few years ago the arches that surrounded the statue of Augustus, in the city of Zaragoza, Aragon (Spain). It took hold on the remains of the Roman walls of Zaragoza.

It was demolished in 1842.

== History ==
Its origin is from the Roman era. In Arab time it was known as Belkala gate and Bad al-Yanud gate and besides used to close the city on the west side was used as input for royal parades and processions coming from the nearby Palace and then the Castle of la Aljafería. It was the gate that closed and Roman and foundational street of Caesaraugusta called Kardus crossing the city from east to west.

In 1210 and by order of King Peter II of Aragon "The Catholic" moved at his side the grain market, thereby giving rise to germ that later became and still is the Central Market of Zaragoza.

It was flanked by two imposing crenelated towers and its monumental arch closed with iron gates.

Since 1440 its two towers became Royal Prison, which it was previously located in the Puerta Cinegia, and in 1556 in Cárcel de Manifestados it was more directed towards political prisoners prison and oppressed by the regime that ruled until it ruled that they had stopped with or without cause, with justice or without enough justice. This figure then particular of the Aragonese laws was also used to hold civil conflicts. It was like a habeas corpus but old. Hosted to the Chusticia of Aragon Juan de Lanuza y Urrea, who in 1591 ended beheaded in the square itself.

In front of this gate was the Market Square, which had been moved in the 12th century from its old location in Puerta Cineja. During the 16th and 17th centuries, was the most important meeting place of the city, there was much commercial activity and in it were held tournaments and bullfights. It was also the place where the pillory for centuries stood to execute death row inmates, intended to serve as an example for citizens, denominating the place, square of the Justice.

After lengthy discussions, it was decided its demolition in 1842 due to its poor condition.

A tile on the calle Manifestación reminds of its location.
