= Convento de San José de los Carmelitas Descalzos (Zaragoza) =

Convent in Aragon, Spain

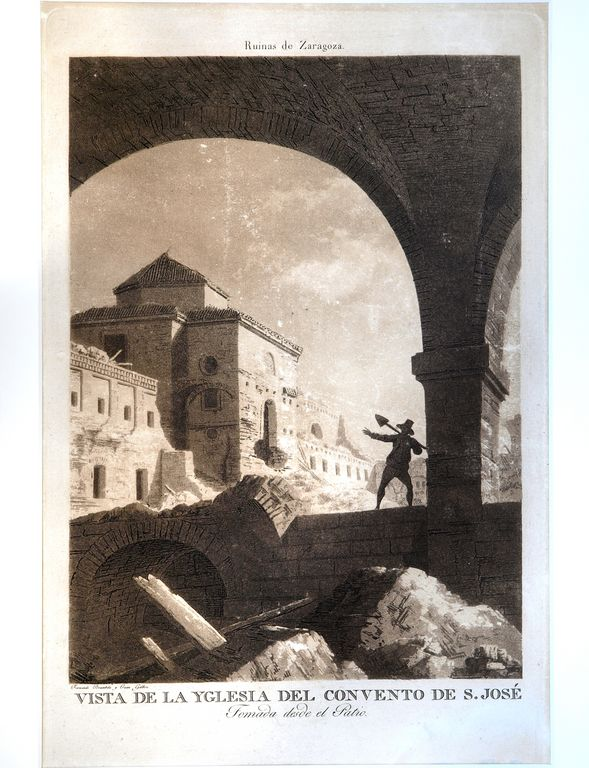
View of the church of the Convent of San José after the French sieges in Zaragoza by Fernando Bambrila and Juan Gálvez in 1813, published in the work Ruinas de Zaragoza

The Convento de San José de los Carmelitas Descalzos (English: Convent of Saint Joseph of Discalced Carmelites) was a convent located in the city of Zaragoza, that belonged to the Discalced Carmelites. It was demolished recently, in the 1970s.

== History ==
This convent was founded in 1594, located next the camino del Bajo Aragón, on the right bank of the Huerva river, outside the City Walls. Ruined and burned during the French sieges of 1808-1809, it was badly damaged. It was rebuilt in 1814, and in 1835 was confiscated and nationalized, using as prison, until 1900, as "Penal de San José". In 1908 it was converted to Intendance's barracks, until 1971, when it was included in the "Operación Cuarteles" (Operation Barracks) and sold to the Zaragoza's City Council that demolished a few years later to wide the camino de las Torres to the Ebro, and to make green areas and other roads.

== Gallery ==
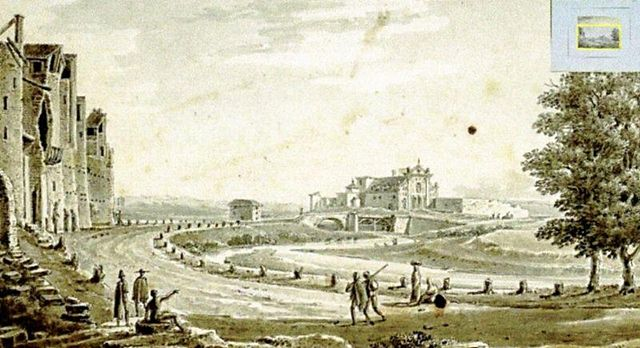
Convento de San José, Zaragoza by Baron Louis-François Lejeune (1775-1848)

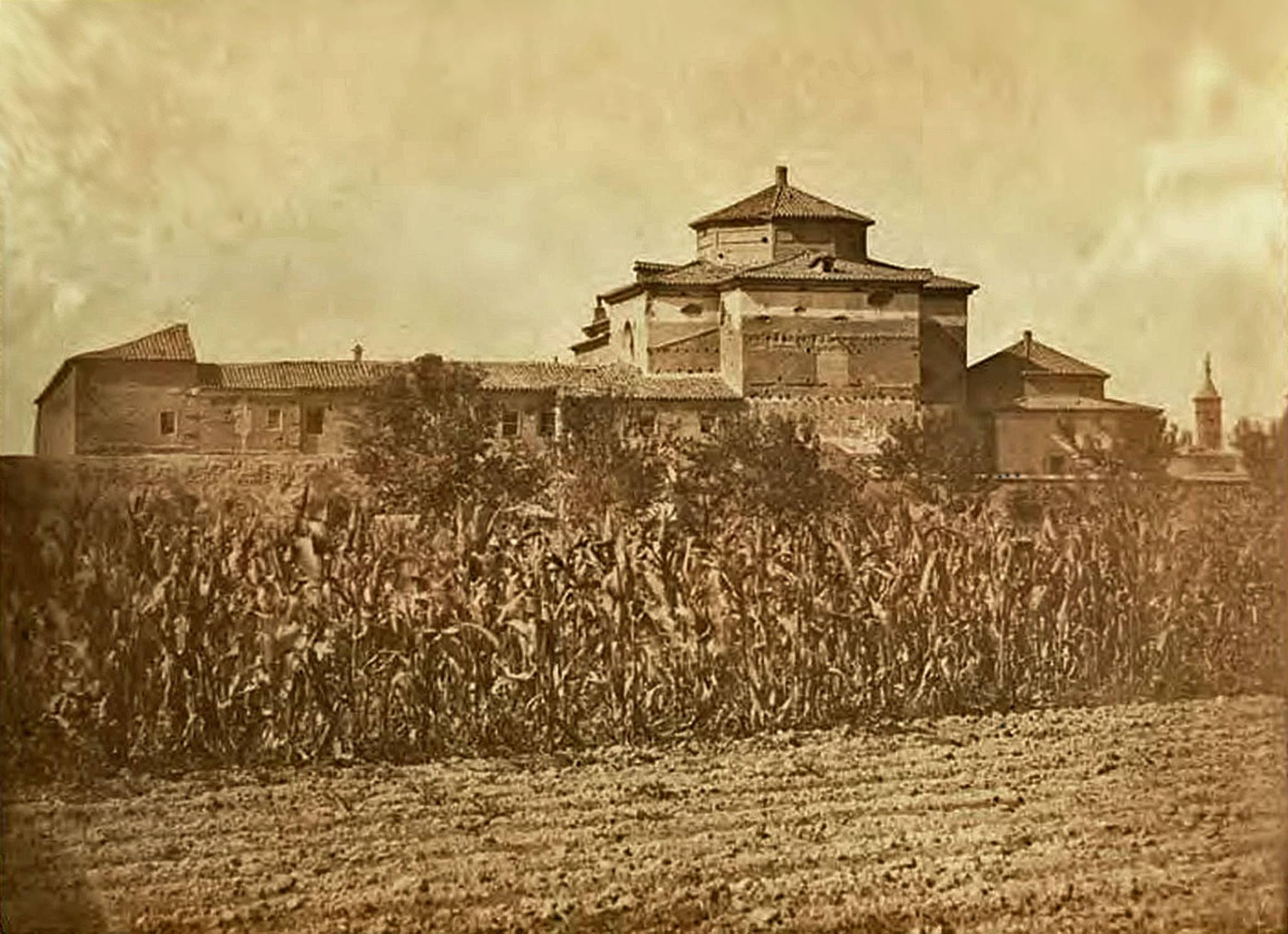
Photograph of the Convento de San José de las Carmelitas Descalzos when it served as a prison (circa 1860)

== See also ==
- Catholic Church in Spain
