= Palacio del Marqués de Palomares =

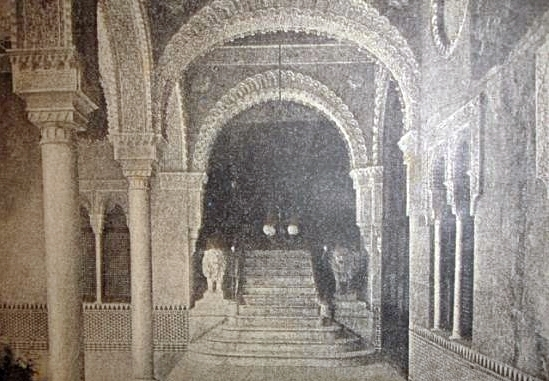
Inside of Palacio del Marqués de Palomares shows the plasterwork of both windows and arches and walls, also two lions flanking the stairs.

The Palacio del Marqués de Palomares (Spanish for Palace of the Marquis of Palomares) was part of a spectacular complex of buildings in Seville, Spain. It was located on the site of the current-day El Corte Inglés store Del Duque.

It was acquired in 1879 by Juan Antonio Fernandez de la Arriba, a successful merchant, as part of the Plaza del Duque complex belonging to the Marquis of Palomares. He used the building as part of his fabric business. A unique blend of architectural styles, it proved to be too difficult to maintain and was demolished in 1965.

== History ==
On the site was the vast Palacio de los Duques de Medina Sidonia (Los Guzmanes) which was destroyed after the Napoleonic invasion and there was built the mid-19th century Palacio del Marqués de Palomares. In 1879 Don Juan Antonio Fernández de la Riva (Arriba), a prosperous Sevillian merchant bought the building located in Plaza del Duque, number 10, in an auction hosted by the Marquis of Palomares. He then founded the Almacenes del Duque (Stores of the Duke), placing on its roof a monumental overburden covering the courtyard and sold fabric, clothing, and drapery.

After his death, one of his children Manuel, a graduate in Law, Philosophy and Letters lived in the palace and made extensive changes to the residence. The place became Almacenes del Duque, an emblematic establishment dedicated to a local trade of textiles, clothing, and parcels.

Relatives and heirs of Manuel Fernández Escobar hired crews of masons to fix damages to the property caused by building age, humidity, and leaking roofs.

Since 1960, efforts were made to sell the palace to various organizations such as the City Hall, Civil Government, Ministerial delegations, etc., but none of these public bodies were willing or could cope with the fees or repairs associated with the acquisition of this impressive property. In 1964, however, the building was acquired by Jorge Bardeau, sold to El Corte Inglés and then demolished.

== Description ==
The Plaza del Duque de la Victoria, houses of the Marqués de Palomares, Sánchez Dalp and de la Familia Cavaleri including the Hotel Venice and the school Colegio Alfonso X el Sabio, formed an Eclectic, Sevillan Regionalist, true architectural style of the 16th century. One of the most spectacular elements of the palace structure were the stairs to the top floor, plasterwork of both windows, arches, and walls, as well as two lions flanking the stairs.
