= Castle of San Jorge =

Medieval fortress in Seville, Spain

Coordinates: 37.3858°N 6.0033°W

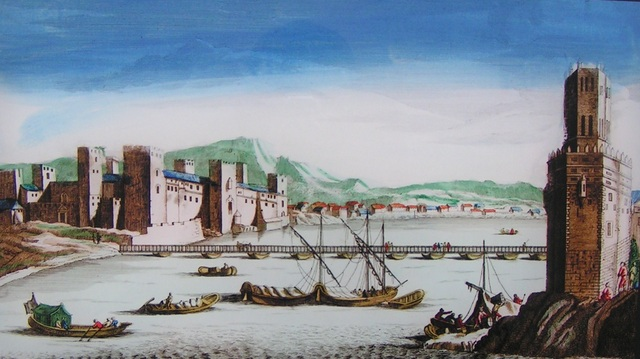
View of the Castle of San Jorge, the Puente de Barcas and the Torre del Oro, in 1770.

The Castle of San Jorge was a medieval fortress built on the west bank of the Guadalquivir river in the Spanish city of Seville (Spain). It was also used as headquarters and prison for the Spanish Inquisition. It was demolished in the 19th century and made into a food market. A museum in the underground ruins focuses on the history of the castle, the Spanish Inquisition and of religious repression. Next to the food market in the Barrio de Triana, the Alley of the Inquisition, which was part of the fortifications, now connects Castilla Street with the Nuestra Señora de la O Walk.

== History ==
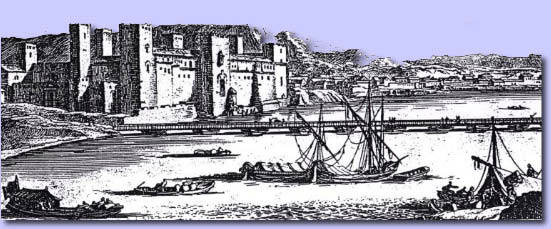
Castle of San Jorge in the city of Seville, facing the Guadalquivir river.

The Visigoths created a fortification in the area next to the river to defend Spalis, the Visigoth name for Seville.

During the Almohad domain in 1171, Jucef Abu Jacub, king of Isbilia, ordered the construction of the Puente de barcas (Bridge of Boats), a floating bridge laid over a row of boats, to link the east and west shores. That bridge was chained to what was then called the Castle of Gabir.

In the same year, the king funneled water from the Guadalquivir from the castle to the inner city, spending a huge sum of money. He ordered the construction of the Alcazar, the Buhaira palace and the fortress of Alcalá de Guadaíra. He was defeated by Afonso I of Portugal at the Siege of Santarém (1184), in which he died. Ferdinand III of Castile, with the help of the fleet of Ramón de Bonifaz, broke the chains and with it the barrier of the bridge. This helped Ferdinand III to take the city in 1248. Up until 1280, the castle belonged to the Military Order of Saint George of Alfama, patron of knights and soldiers.

In 1400, the Order of St. George of Alfama disappeared, and was absorbed by the powerful Order of Montesa.

This, and that the importance of the castle as a defensive element decreased over the years, explains why during the second half of the 15th century the Castle of San Jorge experienced a period of neglect.

The abandoned castle was delivered in 1481 to the newly created Inquisition, who used it as a headquarters and prison.

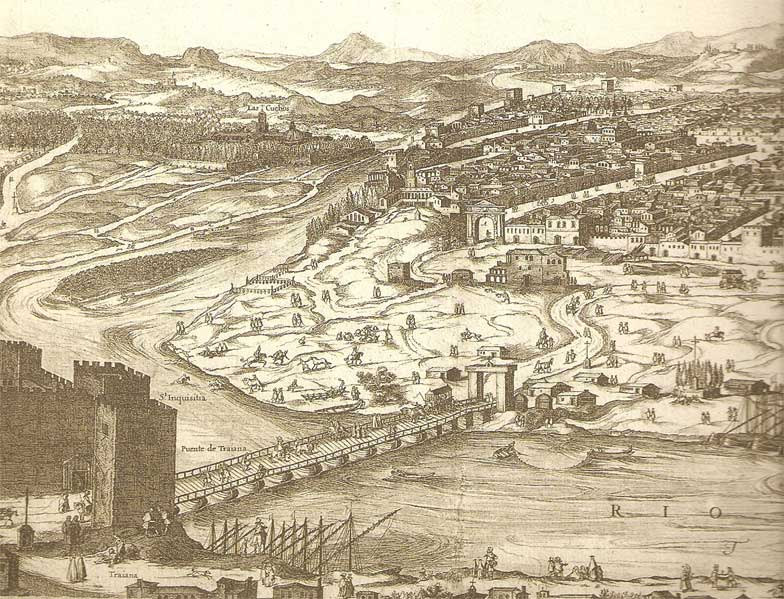
Drawing of Seville in 1617. At the bottom left is the Castle of San Jorge.

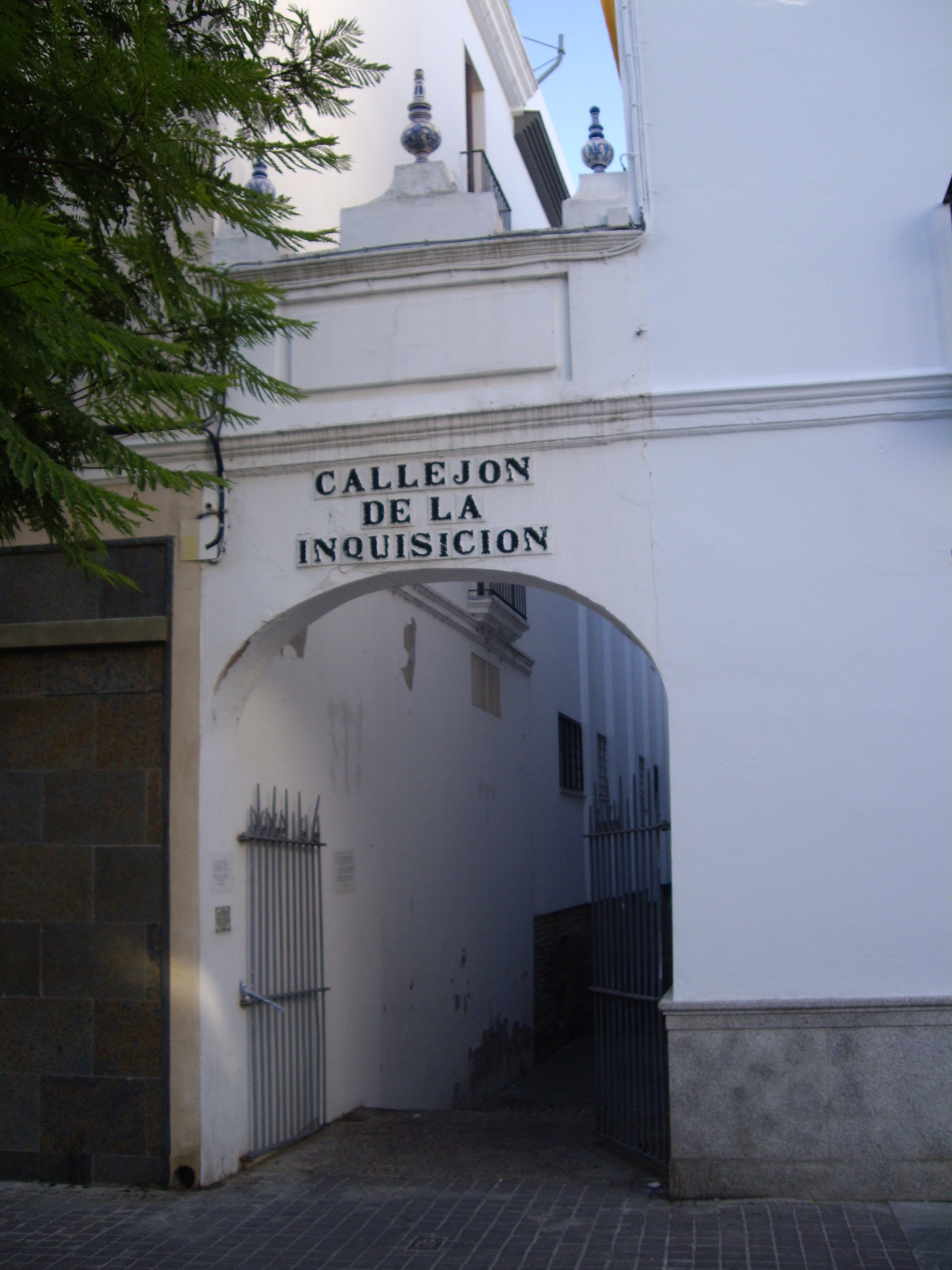
Callejón de la Inquisición (Alley of the Inquisition) seen from the calle Castilla, which was part of the castle. Through it prisoners were taken to the stake.

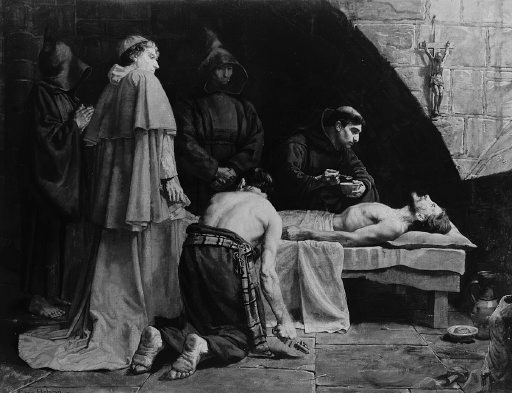
Pietro Torrigiano's death in the Castle of San Jorge of Seville. Engraving of the 19th century.

According to Giorgio Vasari, the Florentine artist Pietro Torrigiano was arrested by the Inquisition, and died in the Castle of San Jorge in 1522 in a kind of hunger strike, although it is possible that this story is apocryphal.

The Inquisition left the castle in 1626, due to the continued deterioration of its walls due to heavy flooding. After that, it was loaned to the Count-Duke of Olivares, in which he dealt with its repairs and care, and the surveillance of goods carried to its doorstep.

Later given to the city, City Hall demolished the castle in the 19th century. It was destroyed to widen the space to connect the Altozano with Castilla street and to create a grain warehouse.

== The Castle today ==
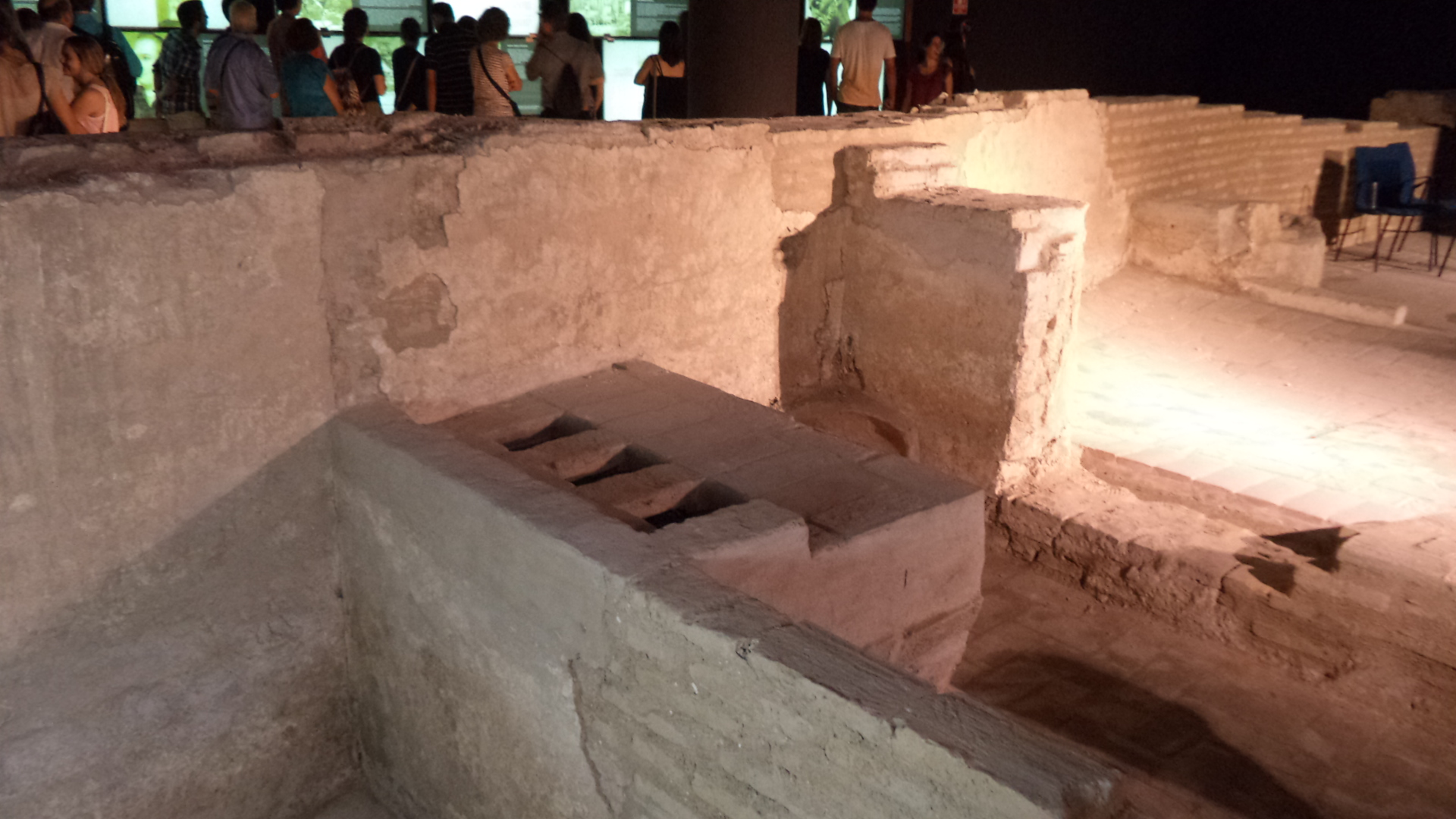
Remains of a kitchen of the castle, in the museum located on its site.

In 1823 the Mercado de Triana was built on the site of the castle, which remains in operation today. Beneath the market numerous archaeological excavations were carried out, which concluded that the remains should be in a museum. In 2009 the City Hall of Seville inaugurated the Castillo de San Jorge project, thus creating an interpretation center for the ruins and the religious repression that the Spanish Inquisition conducted.

== Scenario of Fidelio by Beethoven ==
In 1805, Ludwig van Beethoven premiered his opera Fidelio about a Sevillian prison which held prisoners of conscience in the late-18th century. While he didn't specifically name it in the text, it is very likely that the composer meant the castle of San Jorge. In recent years, Seville has attempted to monetize its operatic past with an initiative called Sevilla Ciudad de Ópera (Spanish for "Seville City of Opera"). This has included Castle tours about the operatic heritage of Seville, and a commemorative plaque installed at the site.
