= Fuerte de Punta Carnero =

Punta Carnero Fort
- Fuerte de Punta Carnero (Spanish)
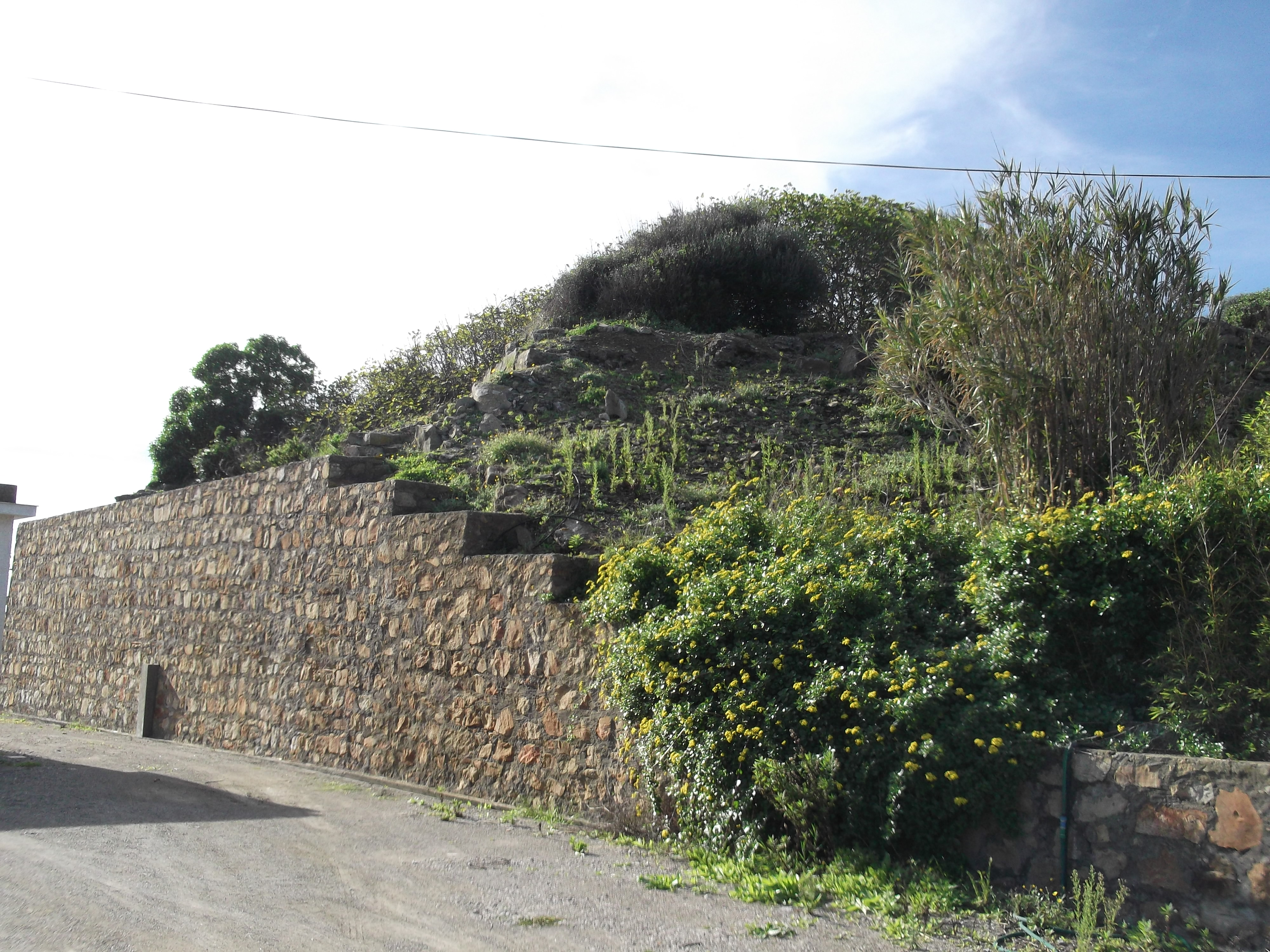
- the remains of the tower of Fuerte de Punta Carnero

- Location within Province of Cádiz Location within Spain
- 36.07722°N 5.4258°W
- Location: Algeciras, Spain

History
- Built: 1730s

Spanish Cultural Heritage
- Official name: Fuerte de Punta Carnero
- Type: Non-movable
- Criteria: Monument
- Reference no.: CA-CAS-013

Fuerte de Punta Carnero was a fort near Algeciras in Spain. It was built before 1735 and was destroyed in 1810 to deny it to the French. Today all that remains are ruined foundations which are a registered Bien de Interés Cultural landmark.

== Description ==
The fort was part of a series built along the coast which were built in sight of one another as a result of the loss of Gibraltar in 1704. The forts were there to protect shipping and to deter any invasion by a British fort from the enclave of the Rock. This fort was at an important location as this is where the Bay of Gibraltar meets the rugged coast of the Strait of Gibraltar. This fort had a watchtower to enable signalling that was slightly higher on the 20 metre cliffs than the main battery. It was able to house twenty soldiers as well as an artillery officer, a sergeant and a corporal. In 1735 there were four guns and by 1796 there were five guns with two mortars. This was later extended to six 24 pounders.

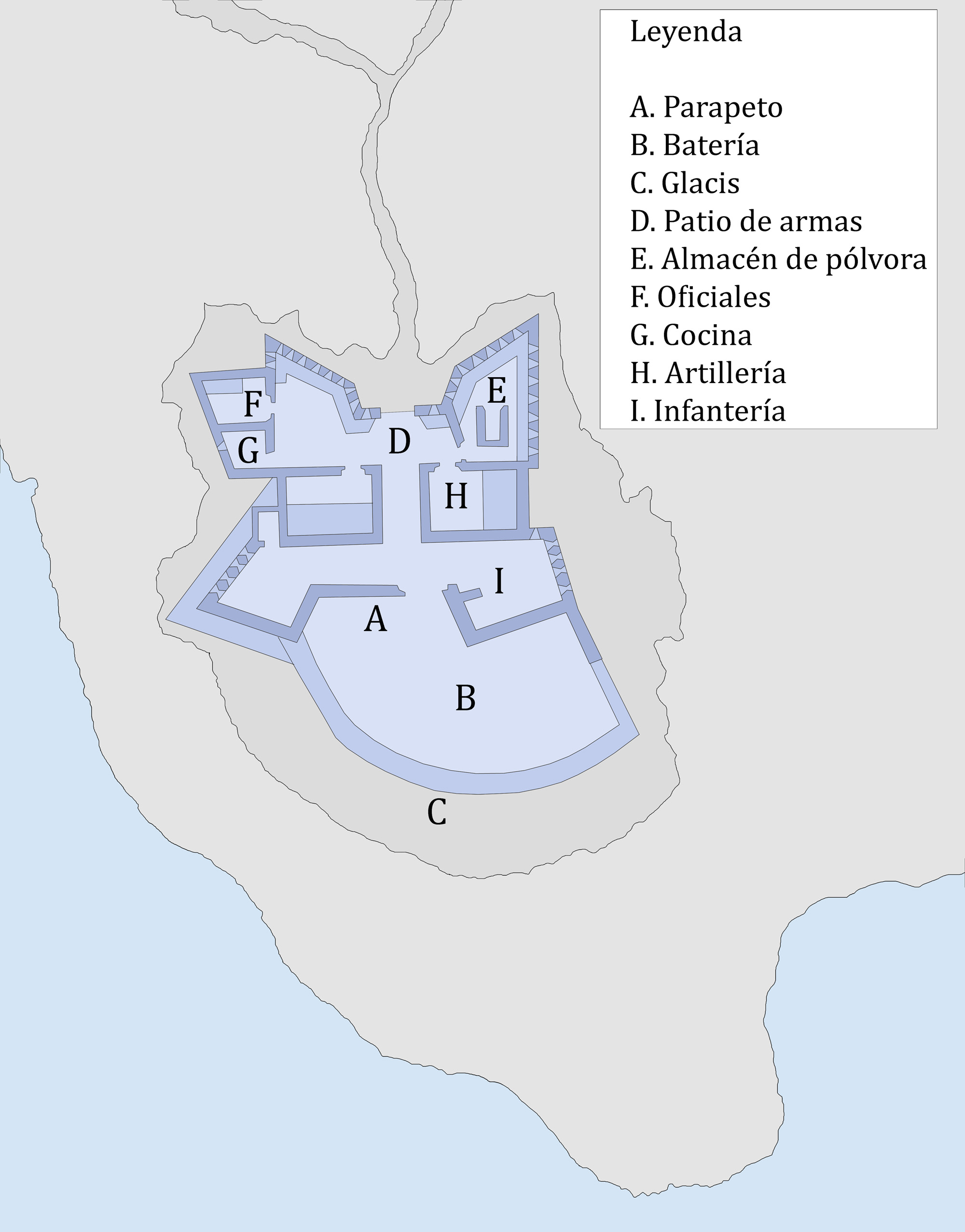

The Spanish fortifications around Gibraltar were destroyed in 1810 to deny their use by Napoleon's forces. The fortifications around the bay were destroyed by Portuguese sailors shortly before the French cavalry arrived in nearby San Roque. The main Spanish lines were destroyed by the Commanding Royal Engineer in Gibraltar, Colonel Sir Charles Holloway, on 14 February 1810.

The remains of this fort were used to construct the lighthouse which is now the main building on this promontory. There are only a few walls remaining of the old fort.
