= Batería de la Atunara =

Historic military installation

Coordinates: 36.178825°N 5.334940°W

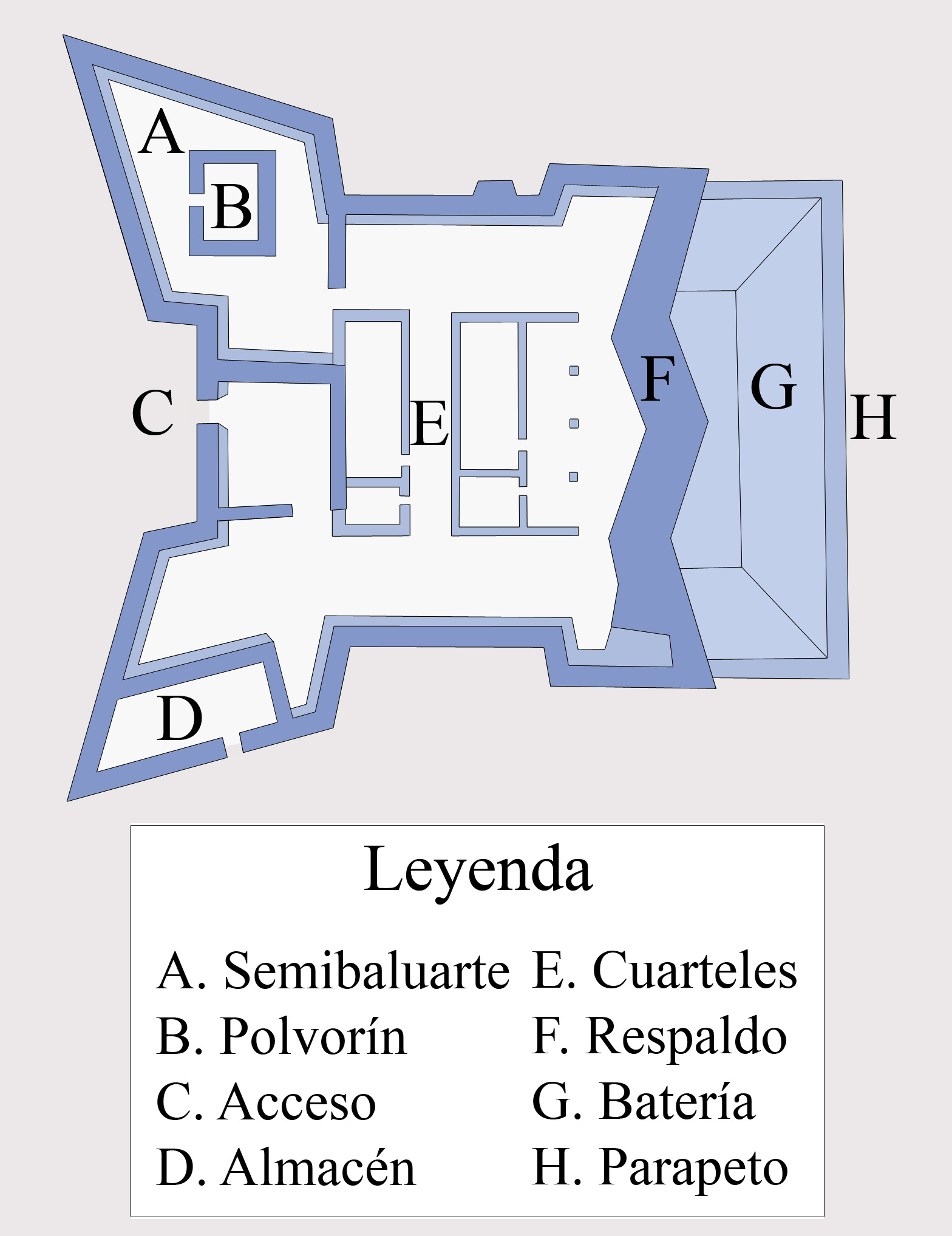
Batería de la Atunara

The Batería de la Atunara (Atunara Battery) was an artillery battery in La Línea de la Concepción, Spain. Constructed by the Spanish military in 1735, it served as part of the line of defenses in the Gibraltar area. It was built by the Government of Spain in fear that the British Overseas Territory would spread over the isthmus.

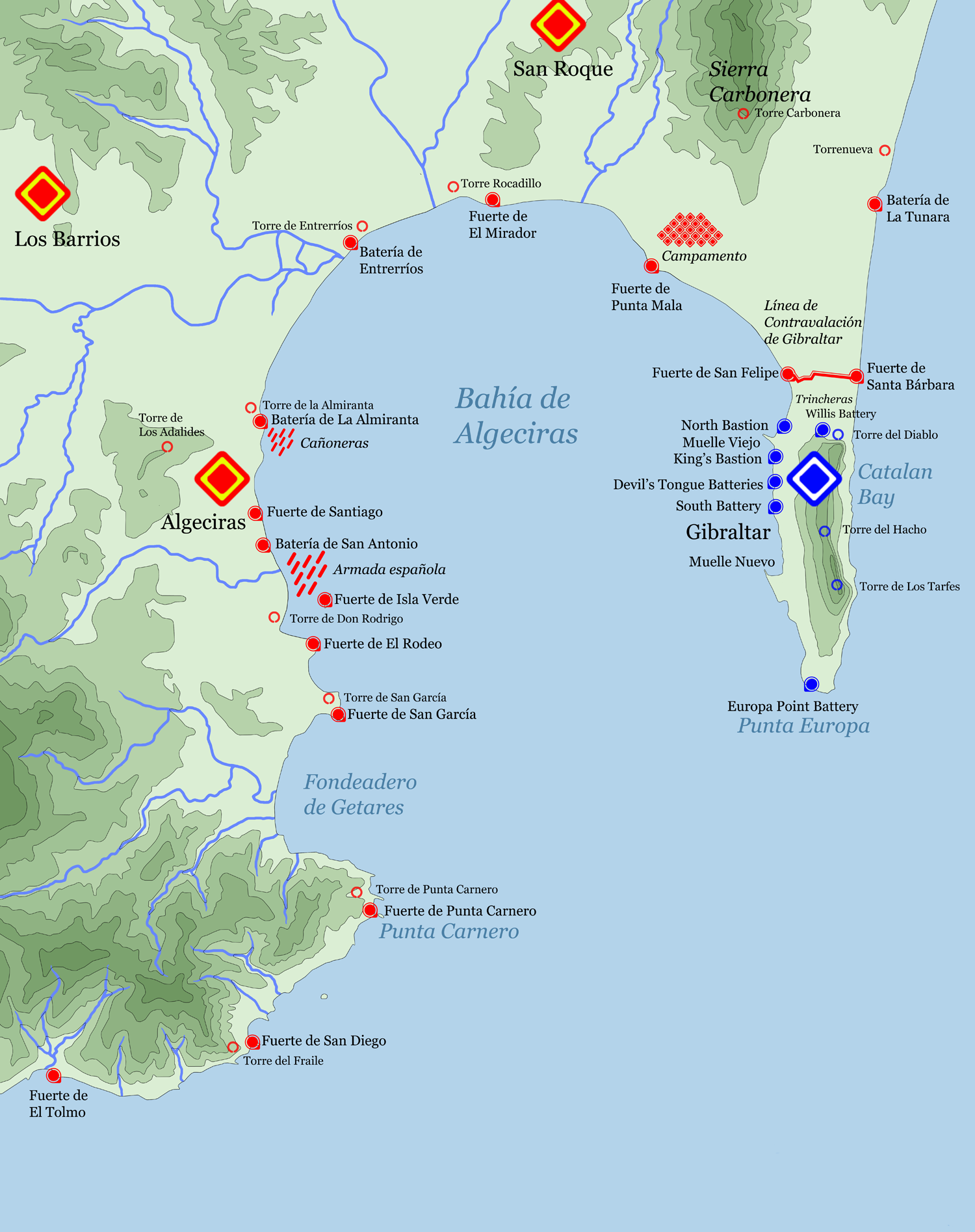
Batería de la Atunara location

The battery was situated on the Playa de La Atunara, north of the Bay of Algeciras protecting the rear of the Lines of Contravallation of Gibraltar. The southern part area of Gibraltar was already protected, however the north lacked a strong artillery that could protect its position, which is why the military advised that half a league from the battery, a detachment with 4 to 24 cannons should be added. The building had two rectangular bastions for protection and were parallel to the ground near the beach, which was protected by a shoulder.

The battery could house an infantry garrison of fifteen men and one officer, six gunners and a corporal, as well as four men and a corporal of the cavalry. By 1796, the battery had only ten men and two gunners. The Spanish fortifications around Gibraltar were completely destroyed in 1810 by Sir Charles Holloway with the supposed agreement of Spain to prevent them from falling into the hands of Napoleon's troops.
