= My Darling, South Africa =

My Darling
- Location within Limpopo Location within South Africa
- Coordinates: 23.088°S 28.802°E
- Country: South Africa
- Province: Limpopo
- District: Capricorn
- Municipality: Blouberg

Area
  - Total: 2.56 km^{2} (0.99 sq mi)

Population (2011)
  - Total: 2,092
  - Density: 817/km^{2} (2,120/sq mi)

Racial makeup (2011)
  - Black African: 99.9%
  - Other: 0.1%

First languages (2011)
  - Northern Sotho: 95.7%
  - S. Ndebele: 1.4%
  - Zulu: 1.3%
  - Other: 1.6%
- Time zone: UTC+2 (SAST)
- PO box: 0791

My Darling is a town in Capricorn District Municipality in the Limpopo province of South Africa. It is located northwest of the Makgabeng Plateau, known for Hananwa rock art. It is also located south of the Kingdom of Mapungubwe. My Darling is planned on an orthogonal street system. The streets remain unpaved. The houses are primarily constructed with modern methods, but there is also a mixture of traditional Rondavel structures. My Darling also has a substantial area dedicated to farming.
