= Mi Tesoro =

Mi Tesoro may refer to:

- "Mi Tesoro", a song by Guardianes Del Amor
- "Mi Tesoro", a song by Jesse & Joy
- "Mi Tesoro", a song by Zion & Lennox from the 2016 album Motivan2
