= Plaza de la Virgen Blanca =

Square in Victoria-Gasteiz, Basque Country, Spain

Coordinates: 42°50′48″N 2°40′24″W

Plaza de la Virgen Blanca (Basque: Birjina Beltzaren Laukidea) is one of the oldest meeting points in Vitoria-Gasteiz in the Basque Country of Spain. In the middle of it there is the monument to the Battle of Vitoria, which took place in 1813 during the Napoleonic Wars.

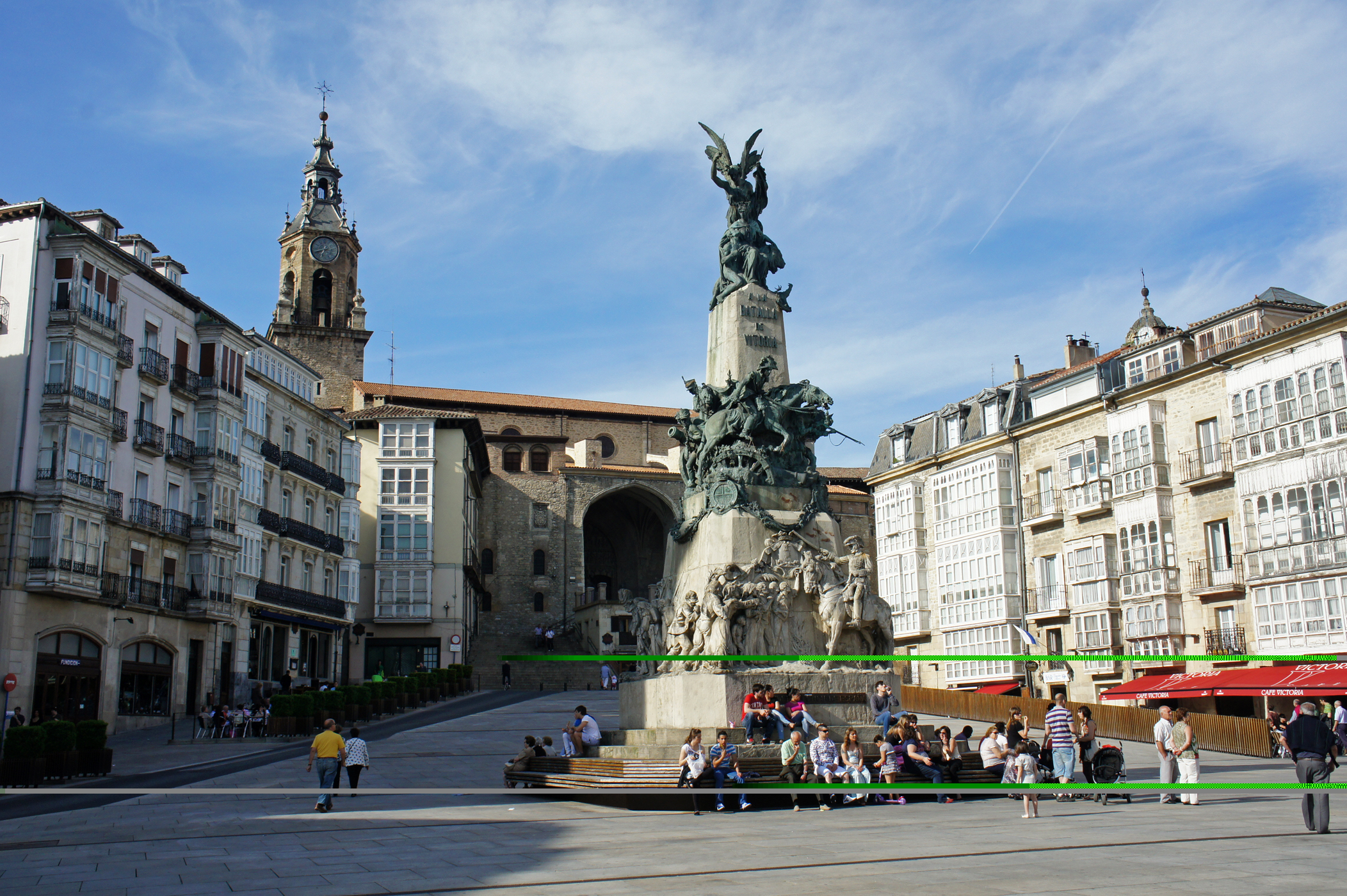
Plaza de la Virgen Blanca

== History ==
In the Middle Ages the square was Vitoria's city center. It was the place where all activities, including bullfights and food markets, were carried out. At the end of the 18th century, Plaza de España or Plaza Nueva was built right next to it by Vitorian architect Justo Antonio de Olaguibel. Due to the construction of the new square the old one became the local's meeting point. In 2007 the flowers that were in the middle of it were removed and fountains were installed in order to modernize the square.

== Virgen Blanca Festivities ==
At 6:00 pm, Celedon's descent is performed from the top of the Church of San Miguel to a balcony across the Virgen Blanca square, where Celedón (a rag doll with an umbrella) slides all the way down suspended by a wire. Meanwhile the citizens stand below it, showering themselves in champagne and singing Celedón's song. Once he reaches the balcony the staff hide the rag doll and a human Celedón appears. Next up, he has to cross the square, helped by a group of friends, to reach the Church of San Miguel and greet the crowds below and wish everyone a happy celebration. This performance marks the start of the celebration in Vitoria-Gasteiz. At 10:00 pm, the Virgen Blanca brotherhood is in charge of organizing a lantern procession.
