= Casa del Tesoro (Madrid) =

Building in Madrid, Spain

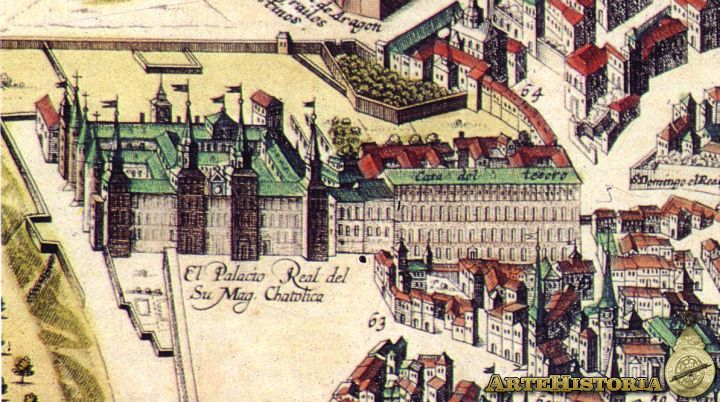
Detail of the Plan by Frederic de Wit (1635), Treasure House (Casa del Tesoro) is at right. On the left, one can see that this building was directly connected with the Alcázar.

The Casa del Tesoro or Treasure House was a building next to the former Royal Alcázar of Madrid.
