= List of La Liga top scorers =

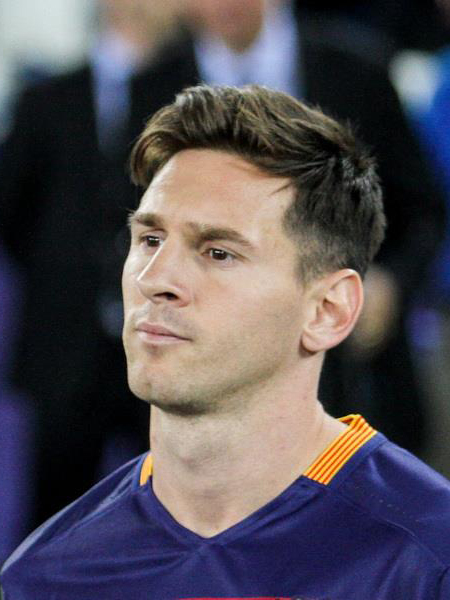
Lionel Messi is the all-time top scorer in La Liga history with 474 goals

La Liga's all-time top scorer is Lionel Messi with 474 goals, all for Barcelona. He also holds the record for most goals scored in a single season with 50 in the 2011–12 campaign, and is the only player ever to win the league's top scorer award in eight different seasons. Athletic Bilbao's Telmo Zarra, who was the competition's all-time top scorer for sixty years until 2014, won the top scorer award six times. Three other players — Real Madrid's Alfredo Di Stéfano, Quini of Sporting Gijón and Barcelona, and Hugo Sánchez of Atlético Madrid and Real Madrid — each finished as top scorer in five individual seasons.

Alfredo Di Stéfano was the first non-European player to score a hundred La Liga goals, though he was a naturalised Spanish citizen by the time he reached the milestone in 1957. Hugo Sánchez became the first North American in 1986 and Samuel Eto'o was the first African to score 100 La Liga goals in 2006.

The most recent player to score 100 goals in the league is Mikel Oyarzabal, who scored his centennial goal on 9 May 2026. Of active players still contracted to a La Liga club, Ante Budimir is the closest to making this list, having scored 97 La Liga goals.

== La Liga players with 100 or more goals ==
Key

- **Bold** shows players still playing in La Liga.
- Italics show players still playing professional football in other leagues.

As of 22 November 2026

Rank	Player	Goals	Apps	Ratio	First	Last	Club(s) (goals/apps)
1	(Argentina) Lionel Messi	474	520	0.91	2004	2021	Barcelona
2	(Portugal) Cristiano Ronaldo	311	292	1.07	2009	2018	Real Madrid
3	(Spain) Telmo Zarra	251	277	0.91	1940	1955	Athletic Bilbao
4	(France) Karim Benzema	238	439	0.54	2009	2023	Real Madrid
5	(Mexico) Hugo Sánchez	234	347	0.67	1981	1994	Atlético Madrid (54/111), Real Madrid (164/207), Rayo Vallecano (16/29)
6	(Spain) Raúl	228	550	0.41	1994	2010	Real Madrid
7	(Argentina) (Spain) Alfredo Di Stéfano	227	329	0.69	1953	1966	Real Madrid (216/282), Espanyol (11/47)
8	(Spain) César	221	353	0.63	1940	1960	Granada (23/24), Barcelona (190/287), Cultural Leonesa (3/15), Elche (5/27)
9	(Spain) Quini	219	448	0.49	1968	1987	Sporting Gijón (165/348), Barcelona (54/100)
10	(Spain) Pahiño	212	278	0.76	1943	1956	Celta Vigo (57/82), Real Madrid (111/124), Deportivo La Coruña (46/72)
11	(France) Antoine Griezmann	205	564	0.36	2010	2026	Real Sociedad (40/141), Atlético Madrid (143/349), Barcelona (22/74)
12	(Spain) Mundo	195	231	0.84	1939	1951	Valencia (186/208), Alcoyano (9/21)
13	(Spain) David Villa	186	352	0.53	2003	2014	Zaragoza (32/73), Valencia (108/166), Barcelona (33/77), Atlético Madrid (13/36)
13	(Spain) Santillana	186	461	0.4	1971	1988	Real Madrid
15	(Spain) Guillermo Gorostiza	183	255	0.72	1929	1946	Athletic Bilbao (111/140), Valencia (72/115)
16	(Spain) Juan Arza	182	349	0.52	1943	1959	Sevilla
17	(Uruguay) Luis Suárez	179	258	0.69	2014	2022	Barcelona (147/191), Atlético Madrid (32/67)
18	(Spain) **Iago Aspas**	171	430	0.4	2012	2026	**Celta Vigo** (169/414), Sevilla (2/16)
19	(Cameroon) Samuel Eto'o	162	280	0.58	1998	2009	Real Madrid (0/3), Mallorca (54/133), Barcelona (108/144)
20	(Spain) Luis Aragonés	160	360	0.44	1960	1975	Oviedo (4/13), Real Betis (33/82), Atlético Madrid (123/253)
21	(Spain) Aritz Aduriz	158	443	0.36	2002	2020	Athletic Bilbao (118/316), Mallorca (23/69), Valencia (17/58)
22	(Hungary) Ferenc Puskás	156	180	0.87	1958	1966	Real Madrid
23	(Spain) Julio Salinas	152	417	0.36	1982	2000	Athletic Bilbao (13/68), Atlético Madrid (31/75), Barcelona (60/146), Deportivo La Coruña (12/24), Sporting Gijón (24/54), Alavés (12/50)
24	(Spain) Adrián Escudero	150	287	0.52	1945	1958	Atlético Madrid
25	(Spain) Dani	147	303	0.49	1974	1986	Athletic Bilbao
26	(Spain) Raúl Tamudo	146	407	0.36	1996	2013	Espanyol (129/340), Real Sociedad (7/31), Rayo Vallecano (10/36)
27	(Spain) Silvestre Igoa	140	283	0.49	1941	1956	Valencia (82/167), Real Sociedad (58/116)
28	(Spain) Manuel Badenes	139	199	0.7	1946	1959	Castellón (4/11), Barcelona (6/13), Valencia (90/96), Valladolid (35/59), Sporting Gijón (4/20)
28	(Spain) Juan Araujo	139	207	0.67	1945	1956	Sevilla
28	(Spain) José Mari Bakero	139	484	0.29	1980	1997	Real Sociedad (67/224), Barcelona (72/260)
31	(Hungary) László Kubala	138	215	0.64	1950	1964	Barcelona (131/186), Espanyol (7/29)
32	(Spain) José Luis Panizo	136	326	0.42	1939	1955	Athletic Bilbao
33	(Spain) Jesús María Satrústegui	133	297	0.45	1973	1986	Real Sociedad
33	(Spain) **Gerard Moreno**	133	354	0.38	2014	2026	**Villarreal** (97/247), Espanyol (36/107)
33	(Spain) Ismael Urzaiz	133	438	0.3	1990	2007	Albacete (1/8), Celta Vigo (1/4), Rayo Vallecano (1/20), Espanyol (14/40), Athletic Bilbao (116/366)
36	(Spain) Joaquín Murillo	131	226	0.58	1954	1964	Valladolid (43/78), Zaragoza (88/148)
37	(Spain) Fernando Ansola	130	323	0.4	1959	1975	Oviedo (8/16), Real Betis (54/114), Valencia (34/106), Real Sociedad (34/87)
38	(Bulgaria) Lyuboslav Penev	129	305	0.42	1989	1999	Valencia (67/167), Atlético Madrid (16/37), Compostela (32/69), Celta Vigo (14/32)
38	(Spain) Roberto Soldado	129	323	0.4	2005	2022	Real Madrid (2/16), Osasuna (11/30), Getafe (29/60), Valencia (59/101), Villarreal (9/38), Granada (16/60), Levante (3/18)
38	(Spain) Paco Gento	129	437	0.3	1952	1971	Racing Santander (2/10), Real Madrid (127/427)
41	(Uruguay) Diego Forlán	128	240	0.53	2004	2012	Villarreal (54/106), Atlético Madrid (74/134)
41	(Spain) Eneko Arieta	128	244	0.52	1951	1966	Athletic Bilbao
41	(Spain) Álvaro Negredo	128	361	0.35	2007	2024	Almería (32/70), Sevilla (70/139), Valencia (10/55), Cádiz (16/97)
44	(Spain) Paco Campos	127	204	0.62	1939	1952	Atlético Madrid (120/193), Sporting Gijón (7/11)
45	(Argentina) Mario Kempes	126	222	0.57	1976	1986	Valencia (116/184), Hércules (10/38)
47	(Spain) Epi Fernández	125	334	0.37	1940	1955	Valencia (79/199), Real Sociedad (46/135)
47	(Spain) Fernando Morientes	124	337	0.37	1993	2009	Albacete (5/22), Zaragoza (28/66), Real Madrid (72/183), Valencia (19/66)
48	(Spain) Emilio Butragueño	123	341	0.36	1983	1995	Real Madrid
48	(Spain) Pirri	123	417	0.29	1964	1980	Real Madrid
50	(Spain) Herrerita	119	229	0.52	1933	1950	Oviedo (110/212), Barcelona (9/17)
50	(Spain) Amancio	119	344	0.35	1962	1976	Real Madrid
52	(Brazil) Ronaldo	117	164	0.71	1996	2007	Barcelona (34/37), Real Madrid (83/127)
52	(Spain) Agustín Gaínza	117	380	0.31	1940	1959	Athletic Bilbao
54	(Uruguay) Cristhian Stuani	116	345	0.34	2010	2026	Levante (8/30), Racing Santander (9/32), Espanyol (25/103), Girona (74/180)
55	(Brazil) Waldo	115	216	0.53	1961	1970	Valencia
55	(Spain) Marañón	115	308	0.37	1970	1983	Real Madrid (5/47), Espanyol (110/261)
57	(Spain) José Juncosa	114	232	0.49	1942	1955	Espanyol (34/44), Atlético Madrid (80/188)
57	(Croatia) Davor Šuker	114	239	0.48	1991	1999	Sevilla (76/153), Real Madrid (38/86)
59	(Spain) Roberto López Ufarte	112	418	0.27	1975	1989	Real Sociedad (101/363), Atlético Madrid (8/27), Real Betis (3/28)
59	(Spain) Raúl García	112	609	0.18	2004	2024	Osasuna (20/101), Atlético Madrid (27/216), Athletic Bilbao (65/292)
61	(Spain) Carlos Muñoz	111	314	0.35	1984	1996	Elche (5/12), Hércules (5/20), Murcia (4/21), Atlético Madrid (4/21), Oviedo (93/240)
61	(Spain) Pedro Uralde	111	338	0.33	1978	1992	Real Sociedad (61/181), Atlético Madrid (8/36), Athletic Bilbao (34/96), Deportivo La Coruña (8/25)
61	(Spain) José Ángel Ziganda	111	381	0.29	1987	2001	Osasuna (35/126), Athletic Bilbao (77/255)
64	(Spain) José Eulogio Gárate	109	241	0.45	1966	1977	Atletico Madrid
65	(Spain) Bata	108	118	0.92	1929	1936	Athletic Bilbao
65	(Spain) Fernando Gómez	108	420	0.26	1983	1998	Valencia
67	(Spain) Mariano Martín	107	130	0.82	1939	1949	Barcelona (99/112), Gimnàstic (8/18)
67	(Argentina) Gonzalo Higuaín	107	190	0.56	2006	2013	Real Madrid
67	(Brazil) Rivaldo	107	198	0.54	1996	2002	Deportivo La Coruña (21/41), Barcelona (86/157)
67	(Spain) Pichi Alonso	107	261	0.41	1978	1989	Zaragoza (70/131), Barcelona (12/51), Espanyol (25/79)
67	(Spain) José Luis Artetxe	107	276	0.39	1950	1965	Athletic Bilbao
72	(Spain) Isidro Lángara	105	90	1.17	1933	1948	Oviedo
72	(Bosnia and Herzegovina) Meho Kodro	105	263	0.4	1991	2000	Real Sociedad (73/129), Barcelona (9/32), Tenerife (18/72), Alavés (5/30)
72	(Spain) Fernando Hierro	105	497	0.21	1987	2003	Valladolid (3/58), Real Madrid (102/439)
75	(Spain) Hermidita	104	160	0.65	1945	1956	Celta Vigo
76	(Paraguay) Cayetano Ré	103	265	0.39	1959	1971	Elche (25/79), Barcelona (55/84), Espanyol (23/102)
76	(Spain) **Mikel Oyarzabal**	103	361	0.29	2015	2026	**Real Sociedad**
76	(Spain) Luis Enrique	103	400	0.26	1989	2004	Sporting Gijón (15/36), Real Madrid (15/157), Barcelona (73/207)
79	(Spain) Guillermo Campanal	102	157	0.65	1934	1946	Sevilla
79	(Spain) Fernando Torres	102	281	0.36	2002	2018	Atlético Madrid
79	(Spain) Manuel Sarabia	102	363	0.28	1976	1991	Athletic Bilbao (84/284), CD Logroñés (18/79)
82	(Spain) Victorio Unamuno	101	141	0.72	1928	1942	Athletic Bilbao (72/86), Real Betis (29/55)
82	(Spain) Julen Guerrero	101	372	0.27	1992	2006	Athletic Bilbao
84	(Netherlands) Roy Makaay	100	205	0.49	1997	2003	Tenerife (21/72), Deportivo La Coruña (79/133)

== Top scorers by season ==
Table key
Indicates player also won the European Golden Shoe in the same season
Indicates the record number of goals scored in a La Liga season

Season	Player	Club	Goals	Apps	Ratio
1929	(Spain) Paco Bienzobas	Real Sociedad	17	18	0.94
1929–30	(Spain) Guillermo Gorostiza	Athletic Bilbao	20	18	1.11
1930–31	(Spain) Bata	Athletic Bilbao	27	17	1.59
1931–32	(Second Spanish Republic) Bata (2)	Athletic Bilbao	13	18	0.72
1932–33	(Second Spanish Republic) Manuel Olivares	Real Madrid	16	14	1.14
1933–34	(Second Spanish Republic) Isidro Lángara	Oviedo	26	18	1.44
1934–35	(Second Spanish Republic) Isidro Lángara (2)	Oviedo	27	22	1.23
1935–36	(Second Spanish Republic) Isidro Lángara (3)	Oviedo	28	21	1.33
1939–40	(Francoist Spain) Víctor Unamuno	Athletic Bilbao	20	22	0.91
1940–41	(Francoist Spain) Pruden	Atlético Madrid	33	22	1.5
1941–42	(Francoist Spain) Mundo	Valencia	27	25	1.08
1942–43	(Francoist Spain) Mariano Martín	Barcelona	30	23	1.3
1943–44	(Francoist Spain) Mundo (2)	Valencia	28	26	1.08
1944–45	(Francoist Spain) Telmo Zarra	Athletic Bilbao	20	26	0.77
1945–46	(Francoist Spain) Telmo Zarra (2)	Athletic Bilbao	24	18	1.33
1946–47	(Francoist Spain) Telmo Zarra (3)	Athletic Bilbao	33	24	1.38
1947–48	(Francoist Spain) Pahiño	Celta Vigo	20	22	0.91
1948–49	(Francoist Spain) César	Barcelona	27	24	1.13
1949–50	(Francoist Spain) Telmo Zarra (4)	Athletic Bilbao	24	26	0.92
1950–51	(Francoist Spain) Telmo Zarra (5)	Athletic Bilbao	38	30	1.27
1951–52	(Francoist Spain) Pahiño (2)	Real Madrid	28	27	1.04
1952–53	(Francoist Spain) Telmo Zarra (6)	Athletic Bilbao	24	29	0.83
1953–54	(Argentina) Alfredo Di Stéfano	Real Madrid	27	28	0.96
1954–55	(Francoist Spain) Juan Arza	Sevilla	28	29	0.97
1955–56	(Argentina) Alfredo Di Stéfano (2)	Real Madrid	24	30	0.8
1956–57	(Argentina) Alfredo Di Stéfano (3)	Real Madrid	31	30	1.03
1957–58	(Francoist Spain) Ricardo Alós	Valencia	19	29	0.66
1957–58	(Francoist Spain) Manuel Badenes	Valladolid	19	29	0.66
1957–58	(Argentina) Alfredo Di Stéfano (4)	Real Madrid	19	30	0.63
1958–59	(Argentina) Alfredo Di Stéfano (5)	Real Madrid	23	28	0.82
1959–60	(Hungary) Ferenc Puskás	Real Madrid	25	24	1.04
1960–61	(Hungary) Ferenc Puskás (2)	Real Madrid	28	28	1
1961–62	(Peru) Juan Seminario	Zaragoza	25	30	0.83
1962–63	(Hungary) Ferenc Puskás (3)	Real Madrid	26	30	0.87
1963–64	(Hungary) Ferenc Puskás (4)	Real Madrid	21	25	0.84
1964–65	(Paraguay) Cayetano Ré	Barcelona	26	30	0.87
1965–66	(Francoist Spain) Luis Aragonés	Atlético Madrid	18	28	0.64
1966–67	(Brazil) Waldo	Valencia	24	30	0.8
1967–68	(Francoist Spain) Fidel Uriarte	Athletic Bilbao	22	24	0.92
1968–69	(Francoist Spain) Amancio	Real Madrid	14	29	0.48
1968–69	(Francoist Spain) José Eulogio Gárate	Atlético Madrid	14	30	0.47
1969–70	(Francoist Spain) Amancio (2)	Real Madrid	16	29	0.55
1969–70	(Francoist Spain) Luis Aragonés (2)	Atlético Madrid	16	30	0.53
1969–70	(Francoist Spain) José Eulogio Gárate (2)	Atlético Madrid	16	30	0.53
1970–71	(Francoist Spain) José Eulogio Gárate (3)	Atlético Madrid	17	28	0.61
1970–71	(Francoist Spain) Carles Rexach	Barcelona	17	28	0.61
1971–72	(Francoist Spain) Enrique Porta	Granada	20	31	0.65
1972–73	(Francoist Spain) Marianín	Oviedo	19	32	0.59
1973–74	(Francoist Spain) Quini	Sporting Gijón	20	34	0.59
1974–75	(Francoist Spain) Carlos	Athletic Bilbao	19	32	0.59
1975–76	(Francoist Spain) Quini (2)	Sporting Gijón	21	34	0.62
1976–77	(Argentina) Mario Kempes	Valencia	24	34	0.71
1977–78	(Argentina) Mario Kempes (2)	Valencia	28	34	0.82
1978–79	(Austria) Hans Krankl	Barcelona	29	30	0.97
1979–80	(Spain) Quini (3)	Sporting Gijón	24	34	0.71
1980–81	(Spain) Quini (4)	Barcelona	20	30	0.67
1981–82	(Spain) Quini (5)	Barcelona	27	32	0.84
1982–83	(Spain) Poli Rincón	Real Betis	20	30	0.67
1983–84	(Uruguay) Jorge da Silva	Valladolid	17	30	0.57
1983–84	(Spain) Juanito	Real Madrid	17	31	0.55
1984–85	(Mexico) Hugo Sánchez	Atlético Madrid	19	33	0.58
1985–86	(Mexico) Hugo Sánchez (2)	Real Madrid	22	33	0.67
1986–87	(Mexico) Hugo Sánchez (3)	Real Madrid	34	41	0.83
1987–88	(Mexico) Hugo Sánchez (4)	Real Madrid	29	36	0.81
1988–89	(Brazil) Baltazar	Atlético Madrid	35	36	0.97
1989–90	(Mexico) Hugo Sánchez (5)	Real Madrid	38	35	1.09
1990–91	(Spain) Emilio Butragueño	Real Madrid	19	35	0.54
1991–92	(Spain) Manolo	Atlético Madrid	27	36	0.75
1992–93	(Brazil) Bebeto	Deportivo La Coruña	29	37	0.78
1993–94	(Brazil) Romário	Barcelona	30	33	0.91
1994–95	(Chile) Iván Zamorano	Real Madrid	28	38	0.74
1995–96	(Spain) Juan Antonio Pizzi	Tenerife	31	41	0.76
1996–97	(Brazil) Ronaldo	Barcelona	34	37	0.92
1997–98	(Italy) Christian Vieri	Atlético Madrid	24	24	1
1998–99	(Spain) Raúl	Real Madrid	25	37	0.68
1999–2000	(Spain) Salva Ballesta	Racing Santander	27	36	0.75
2000–01	(Spain) Raúl (2)	Real Madrid	24	36	0.67
2001–02	(Spain) Diego Tristán	Deportivo La Coruña	20	35	0.57
2002–03	(Netherlands) Roy Makaay	Deportivo La Coruña	29	38	0.76
2003–04	(Brazil) Ronaldo (2)	Real Madrid	24	32	0.75
2004–05	(Uruguay) Diego Forlán	Villarreal	25	38	0.66
2004–05	(Cameroon) Samuel Eto'o	Barcelona	25	37	0.68
2005–06	(Cameroon) Samuel Eto'o (2)	Barcelona	26	34	0.76
2006–07	(Netherlands) Ruud van Nistelrooy	Real Madrid	25	37	0.68
2007–08	(Spain) Dani Güiza	Mallorca	27	37	0.73
2008–09	(Uruguay) Diego Forlán (2)	Atlético Madrid	32	33	0.97
2009–10	(Argentina) Lionel Messi	Barcelona	34	35	0.97
2010–11	(Portugal) Cristiano Ronaldo	Real Madrid	40	34	1.18
2011–12	(Argentina) Lionel Messi (2)	Barcelona	50	37	1.35
2012–13	(Argentina) Lionel Messi (3)	Barcelona	46	32	1.44
2013–14	(Portugal) Cristiano Ronaldo (2)	Real Madrid	31	30	1.03
2014–15	(Portugal) Cristiano Ronaldo (3)	Real Madrid	48	35	1.37
2015–16	(Uruguay) Luis Suárez	Barcelona	40	35	1.11
2016–17	(Argentina) Lionel Messi (4)	Barcelona	37	34	1.09
2017–18	(Argentina) Lionel Messi (5)	Barcelona	34	36	0.94
2018–19	(Argentina) Lionel Messi (6)	Barcelona	36	34	1.06
2019–20	(Argentina) Lionel Messi (7)	Barcelona	25	33	0.76
2020–21	(Argentina) Lionel Messi (8)	Barcelona	30	35	0.86
2021–22	(France) Karim Benzema	Real Madrid	27	32	0.84
2022–23	(Poland) Robert Lewandowski	Barcelona	23	34	0.68
2023–24	(Ukraine) Artem Dovbyk	Girona	24	36	0.67
2024–25	(France) Kylian Mbappé	Real Madrid	31	34	0.91
2025–26	(France) Kylian Mbappé (2)	Real Madrid	25	31	0.81

== See also ==
- Pichichi Trophy
- European Golden Shoe
- List of footballers with 400 or more La Liga appearances
