= 1949 Copa del Generalísimo final =

Copa del Generalísimo 1949 final
- Event: 1948-49 Copa del Generalísimo
Valencia	Atlético Bilbao
1	0
- Date: 29 May 1949
- Venue: Estadio Chamartín, Madrid
- Referee: Julián Arqué
- Attendance: 70,000

The Copa del Generalísimo 1949 final was the 47th final of the King's Cup. The final was played at Estadio Chamartín in Madrid, on 29 May 1949, being won by Valencia CF, who beat Atlético de Bilbao 1–0.

== Match details ==
29 May 1949
18:45 CET

Valencia	1–0	Atlético Bilbao
Epi 62'	Report (in Spanish)

Estadio Chamartín, Madrid
Attendance: 70,000
Referee: Julián Arqué

Valencia

Atlético Bilbao

GK	1	(Spain) Ignacio Eizaguirre
DF	2	(Spain) Vicente Asensi
DF	3	(Spain) Álvaro
DF	4	(Spain) Luis Díaz
MF	5	(Spain) Salvador Monzó
MF	6	(Spain) Antonio Puchades
FW	7	(Spain) Epi
FW	8	(Spain) Pasieguito
FW	9	(Spain) Mundo (c)
FW	10	(Spain) Silvestre Igoa
FW	11	(Spain) Vicente Seguí
Manager:
(Spain) Jacinto Quincoces

GK	1	(Spain) Raimundo Lezama
DF	2	(Spain) Francisco Celaya
DF	3	(Spain) Roberto Bertol (c)
DF	4	(Spain) Manuel Barrenechea
MF	5	(Spain) José Luis Panizo
MF	6	(Spain) Canito
FW	7	(Spain) José Luis Bilbao
FW	8	(Spain) Venancio
FW	9	(Spain) Telmo Zarra
FW	10	(Spain) Félix Arrieta
FW	11	(Spain) Agustín Gaínza
Manager:
(England) Harry Bagge
