= Álvaro (footballer, born 1916) =

Spanish footballer and manager (1916–1997)

Personal information
- Full name: Álvaro Pérez Vázquez
- Date of birth: 30 March 1916
- Place of birth: Mondoñedo, Spain
- Date of death: 23 October 1997 (aged 81)
- Place of death: Valencia, Spain
- Position: Defender

Senior career*
| Years | Team | Apps | (Gls) |
| 1939 | Recuperación de Levante | | |
| 1939–1950 | Valencia | 165 | (1) |
| 1950–1953 | Hércules | | |
| Total | | 165 | (1) |

Managerial career
- Mondoñedo FC
- 1955–1957: Granada
- 1957–1959: Levante
- 1959–1960: Hércules
- 1960–1961: Córdoba
- 1961–1962: Real Oviedo
- 1962–1963: Granada
- 1963–1964: Cartagena
- 1964–1967: Algeciras
- 1967–1968: Levante
- 1968–1969: Hércules
- 1969–1970: Orihuela
- 1970–1972: Villarreal
- 1973–1975: Hellín Deportivo
- 1976–1977: Levante
- 1979–1980: Algeciras
- 1981–1982: Vall de Uxó
- * Club domestic league appearances and goals

Álvaro Pérez Vázquez, better known as Álvaro (30 March 1916 – 23 October 1997), was a Spanish footballer who played as a defender for Valencia in the 1940s. He is one of the most important figures in the history of Valencia, where he stayed for 11 seasons as an undisputed starter, playing a crucial role in the team that won three La Ligas (1941–42, 1943–44, and 1946–47), two Copa del Rey titles (1941 and 1949), and one Copa Eva Duarte in 1949.

After retiring, he became a manager, taking over the likes of Granada, Real Oviedo, and Villarreal.

== Early life ==
Álvaro Pérez Vázquez was born in the Galician town of Mondoñedo on 30 March 1916, as the son of María Amparo Josefa Vázquez Álvarez and José Pérez Castrillo, the latter being a native of Santander. He began playing football for modest teams in his hometown, learning it from his brother Pepe, a high-ranking air force officer who spread his knowledge of the sport to the youth of Mondoñedo.

== Career ==
=== Early career ===
A devout Falangist, Álvaro fought for the national faction during the Spanish Civil War, during which he became a member of Recuperación de Levante, a battalion whose mission was to recover parts from broken trucks and planes for repair in Levante, and which ended up formed an impressive football team that not only played several friendly matches in Valencia, but also participated in the 1938–39 Aragón Regional Championship.

Notably, on 12 May 1939, Álvaro held off the in-form Fernando Sañudo to help his side to a 3–1 victory over the eventual champions Club Aviación Nacional. During a match at Les Corts on 18 July 1939, he was sought after by Barcelona, who was looking to rebuild its squad following the Civil War. Following a 2–1 loss to Ceuta on 8 August, the local journalists expressed their admiration for three Recuperación players, including Álvaro and Mundo, labelling them as imminent international players for Spain.

=== Valencia CF ===
Once the conflict ended in 1939, the Spanish Army liquidated its crews, which allowed Luis Colina, Valencia's sporting director, to sign Recuperación's best players: Álvaro, Mundo, Waldo Botana, and Poli Inchaurregui. He quickly established himself as an undisputed starter in Valencia, forming a great defensive partnership with Juan Ramón, which is widely regarded as the best pair of center-backs in Valencia's history. Throughout the years, Ramón began seeing Álvaro as the brother he lost, despite Álvaro being a Galician who fought on the national side and Ramón being an anti-Franco Basque.

Together with Ramón, Mundo, and Vicente Asensi, Álvaro played a crucial role in the great Valencia team of the 1940s, which won three Leagues (1941–42, 1943–44, and 1946–47), two Spanish Cups (1941 and 1949), and one Valencian Regional Championship (1940) for a total of six titles, as well as one Cup runners-up (1944) and two League runners-up (1947–48, 1948–49). However, he was unable to earn a single cap for Spain; he was called up only once, for friendly against Switzerland at the Mestalla, but remained an unused substitute. Álvaro started in all three Cup finals, a 3–1 victory over Espanyol in 1941, a 2–0 loss to Athletic Bilbao in 1944, and achieving their revenge over Bilbao in 1949, keeping a clean-sheet in a 1–0 victory.

A tough player, Álvaro was never intimidated by opponents, being very hard to beat both in the air and on the ground, with his only weakness being his overconfidence. Sports journalist Manuel Sarmiento Birba once described him as "a defender of great power and sensational nerve. Tough, with manly tackles, he always exposed himself greatly in his interventions". Therefore, Álvaro sustained several serious and unusual injuries throughout his career, such as a ruptured eardrum following a blow that nearly left him deaf in Alicante, or a kidney hemorrhage following a blow that nearly killed him, forcing him to miss over half of the 1945 league season. Over the years, he and Ramón dominated zonal coverage, so both began to struggle following the tactical revolution of the WM, as they failed to adapt to strict man-to-man marking, and even though Álvaro managed to convert to the newly-created center-back position, he soon decided to leave that role to Salvador Monzó. He stayed at Valencia for eleven years, from 1939 until 1950, always as an undisputed starter, playing a total of 282 official matches, including 165 La Liga matches.

In 1950, Álvaro wrote a very emotional letter to bid farewell to the Valencia fans before following Mundo to Hércules, with whom he played for three years, from 1950 until he retired in 1953, aged 37.

== Managerial career ==
After retiring, Álvaro became a manager, taking over Levante in the 1952–53 season. On holiday trips to his hometown of Mondoñedo, he coached the local youth at the Campo de la Feria, and even coached the local club on one occasion in the mid-1950s. Having started his managerial career with his hometown team, Álvaro then took over Granada in 1955, a position that he held for two years, until early 1957, when he was replaced by Luis Pasarín. He led his former club Hércules on two occasions (1959–60 and 1968–69).

In the early 1960s, Álvaro oversaw for one season each the likes of Córdoba (1960–61), Real Oviedo (1961–62), Granada again (1962–63), and Cartagena (1963–1964), which was followed by a three-year stint at the helm of Algeciras (1964–67). He took over Oviedo on 20 October 1961, and left just four months later, on 27 February 1962, being replaced by Antón. Notably, he also coached Villarreal from 1970 until 1972, and Algeciras again in 1980.

== Death and legacy ==
After leaving the world of football, he settled in Valencia, where he died on 23 October 1997, at the age of 81.

In November 2009, Álvaro was voted as Valencia's greatest defender by the club's fans.

== Honours ==
Valencia CF

- Valencia Championship:
  - Champions (1): 1940
- Copa del Rey:
  - Champions (2): 1941 and 1949
  - Runner-up (1): 1944
- La Liga:
  - Champions (3): 1941–42, 1943–44, and 1946–47
  - Runner-up (2): 1947–48 and 1948–49
- Copa Eva Duarte:
  - Champions (1): 1949
