= Juan Ramón (footballer, born 1912) =

Spanish footballer and manager

Personal information
- Full name: Juan Ramón Santiago
- Date of birth: 8 March 1912
- Place of birth: Erandio, Biscay, Spain
- Date of death: 15 October 1999 (aged 87)
- Place of death: València
- Position: Defender

Senior career*
Years	Team	Apps	(Gls)
1928–1930	Erandio		
1930–1933	Alavés	1	(0)
1933–1934	Gimnástico		
1934–1950	Valencia	243	(1)
1950–1952	Mestalla	40	(0)

International career
1942	Spain	2	(0)

Managerial career
- 1953–1954: Mestalla
- 1955: Badajoz
- 1957–1958: Eldense
- 1959–1961: Atlético Ceuta
- 1961–1962: Elche
- 1962–1964: Sabadell
- 1964–1965: Mallorca
- 1965–1967: Castellón
- 1968–1969: Racing Ferrol
- 1969: Málaga
- 1970: Onteniente
- 1972–1973: Eldense
- 1974: Ceuta
- * Club domestic league appearances and goals

Juan Ramón Santiago (8 March 1912 – 15 October 1999) was a Spanish footballer who played as a defender for Valencia CF, and Spain in the 1930s and 1940s. After retiring, he became a manager, taking charge of several lower divisions sides, such as Sabadell FC and RCD Mallorca.

He is one of the most important figures in the history of Valencia CF, playing with the club for 13 seasons as an undisputed starter and being its captain for several years, leading his side to three La Ligas (1941–42, 1943–44, and 1946–47), two Copa del Rey titles (1941 and 1949), and one Copa Eva Duarte in 1949, with the image of him collecting trophies throughout the 1940s iconically symbolizing his significance in the club.

== Early life ==
Juan Ramón was born on 8 March 1912 in the Biscayan town of Erandio, as the youngest child of Eduardo Ramón and María Santiago. His childhood, having lost his mother, was spent with his uncles. As a young man he practiced rowing, Basque pelota, and cycling, but what he liked the most was football. He left the Salesianos school at age 15 and went to work in a furniture factory.

In one summer, Ramón participated in a championship for amateur teams organized by the town's club and they saw him with so much enthusiasm and power that at the end of the Tournament, SD Erandio Club took him into their ranks. Initially, he played as a midfielder, but coach Teodoro Sañudo "El Chato" put him as a winger because he was skinny.

== Club career ==
=== Early career ===
Ramón began playing at the age of 16 on his town's team, the Erandio Club, founded the same year he was born. At the end of the 1929–30 season, the 18-year-old Ramón was signed by Amadeo García to play for Deportivo Alavés, then coached by José Baonza and where he coincided with Simón Lecue, making his debut in La Liga on 1 March 1931, in the 13th matchday against Athletic Club. Even though Amadeo wanted to extend his contract, offering him 400 pesetas in salary and a job at the Metalúrgica, he still left the club at the end of the season, although years later he regretted the decision not to continue at Alavés.

Ramón returned to his hometown club Erandio, which reclassified him as an amateur, thus forcing him to return to his job in the furniture store. It was around this time that he was placed as a left defender, a position from which he would no longer move in the following teams where he played. By the age of 21, he had become a tall and imposing left defender, with plenty of physical and technical resources, and exquisite positioning on the field, so he soon began receiving many interesting offers, and ended up choosing to come to Valencia to play with Gimnástico FC until the following summer, in which three First Division teams competed for his services: Sevilla, Espanyol, and Valencia, but he leaned towards the latter due to having good friends there and loving the climate. He was signed by Valencia's sporting director Luis Colina, with whom he reached an agreement of six thousand pesetas in token and 700 in salary. On 26 August 1934, he made his debut for Valencia in a friendly match against Torrente, and a few months later, on 9 December, he made his La Liga debut against Arenas de Getxo in its second matchday.

=== Spanish Civil War ===
Like so many young players of his generation, his career was halted by the outbreak of the Spanish Civil War in 1936, which caught him in Bilbao, on holiday with the woman that he had just married. As a supporter and confessed militant of the Basque Nationalist Party (PNV), he was called to join a battalion of gudaris and show loyalty to the party, thus enlisting in the Basque army, where he remained for the next two years. Due to his family's ideological tendencies, he lost his father to cachexia in a concentration camp in Galicia, his brother Julián to torture in the El Dueso prison in Santoña, and his uncle to forced labor in the construction of the Valley of the Fallen.

When the War ended in 1939, he formed a great defensive partnership with Álvaro, which is widely regarded as the best pair of center-backs in Valencia's history. Even though Ramón was an anti-Franco Basque and Álvaro a Galician who fought in the war on the national side, both ended up united in a peculiar friendship, with Juan Ramón finding in Álvaro the brother he lost.

=== Valencia ===
Throughout the 1940s, Ramón never stopped improving defensively at all levels, managing to mitigate, over the years, the lack of speed with a sensational withdrawal capacity that turned his defensive zone into a funnel for rivals. He never showed interest in the attack, and only scored one official goal with Valencia, on 13 February 1944 at the Metropolitano, with a strong clearance that, helped by the strong wind, found Jesús Ederra dislocated and entered the goal of the Atlético Madrid.

Ramón was an undisputed starter in Valencia for 13 years, playing a crucial role in helping his side win three Leagues (1941–42, 1943–44, and 1946–47), two Spanish Cups (1941 and 1949), and three Valencian Regional Championships for a total of eight titles, not to mention three Cup runners-up (1934, 1937, and 1944) and two League runners-up (1947–48, 1948–49). As a member of the PNV, he did not sympathize at all with Franco, but as captain of Valencia, he had to collect most of these titles from the hands of the Generalísimo, the man for whom his family was killed. In the 1941 Cup final, he helped his side to a 3–1 win over Espanyol, thus becoming the first Valencia captain to lift the Copa del Rey.

His prestige at the end of the 40s was unquestionable, with the press considering him an oracle and he even gave his name to a team in the regional competition. Despite having offers from other important clubs, such as FC Barcelona, he never wanted to leave the club that trusted him years ago and kept renewing his contract year after year until he retired. In total, Ramón scored 1 goal in 243 La Liga matches, and played 358 official matches with Valencia (436, including friendlies).

=== Later career ===
In 1950, the 38-year-old Ramón was playing little, but was still in shape, so he did not hesitate to accept Carlos Iturraspe's proposal to play for CD Mestalla, the club's second team (now known as VCF Mestalla). Notably, in 1952, Ramón participated in 29 League games in a triumphant season in which the subsidiary team was crowned champion of the Second Division and thus achieved promotion to the First Division, later frustrated by the Spanish Football Federation (RFEF).

== International career ==
Ramón made his international debut for Spain in a friendly match against Nazi Germany in Berlin on 12 April 1942, at the age of 30, starting in a 1–1 draw. He earned his second and last international cap in the following week, on 19 April, again in a friendly, against Italy in San Siro, starting in a 0–4 loss.

== Playing style and antics ==
Despite always being rocky in contact, Ramón was not a tough player, so he avoided clashes with his rivals, but still, he suffered several serious injuries; for instance, Marcelino Campanal broke his nose in a match against Sevilla, leaving him forever with that look of an experienced boxer. Julio Elícegui broke his arm in a match against Atlético Madrid, which meant a long period of inactivity, and after a clash with a Castellón forward on 14 November 1943, both players had to be removed with bloody faces. These chapters are good examples of his bravery, as he did not hesitate to risk his physical condition at a time when he played with only two defenders, who had to deal with a line of five forwards.

Ramón only suffered two red cards throughout his career; the first, in the final of the 1937 Copa de la España Libre on 18 July, after getting into a fight with Levante player Vicente Martínez Catalá, who went to the locker room with him, and the second red card in Murcia, on 23 February 1941, in front of a stadium inflamed by the rumors of the nationalist newspapers, where they shouted "criminal" at him every time he touched the ball, causing the referee, twisted by the fear of the virulence of the stands, to beg him to leave the field of play.

According to his son, Ramón lasted until his 40s because of his healthcare: He never smoked or drank, and trained every day of the year, rarely took a break or a vacation, and after the games, the first thing he did when he arrived home was to sleep for two hours to recover. He used to say that "spending money to squander health is nonsense".

At the time, footballers had little rights and rarely received what their contracts stipulated, so Ramón, irreducible both on and off the field, raised his voice against the habitual abuses of clubs and used his influence to obtain good bonuses for his teammates, preventing many of them from falling into trouble by advising them on what they should sign. He had no qualms about acting as a kit man, carefully preparing the team's clothing when the person in charge of the equipment was sick.

== Managerial career ==
After his career as a player ended, Ramón remained linked to CD Mestalla, now as a coach, which he oversaw for one season in 1953–54. On 24 May 1950, he was awarded the silver medal for Sports Merit by the RFEF, and a few years later, Valencia awarded the Gold and Diamond Badge to Ramón, who extended his services to the club as the coach of Mestalla until 1955.

He later coached Badajoz, Eldense, Atlético de Ceuta (currently known as Ceuta), Castellón, Ferrol, and Ontinyent in the Second Division, as well as Elche, in the top category, between 1955 and 1970. During his second season at the helm of Ceuta in 1960–61, the club was the leader for many days in the second Group of the Second Division, but ultimately finished as runner-ups to Tenerife, and then lost the promotion play-off to Elche 4–1 on aggregate. A few days later, Ramón announced that he was not renewing his contract because he had signed to coach Elche in the first division. After one season there, he moved to Sabedell in 1962, where he stayed for two years, until 1964.

In August 1970, Ramón became the coach of Ontinyent, being introduced to the players by its president Francisco Martínez González. Despite experiencing an extensive career as a coach, he was never able to coach Valencia, although he remained a scout for the club until he was 75.

== Later life and death ==
Ramón lost one of his three children when he was barely a year old. He also ran a successful bar-restaurant in Valencia, where he served and commented on the games with a directness that is unthinkable in today's football, and on one occasion, after returning from a match, the police were waiting for him at the northern station and arrested him because the restaurant was two and a half minutes past closing time.

According to his son, "Ramón lived his political ideals in a totally internal way due to being an introvert. Except when talking about football, that was where he transformed. He gave many lectures, and some people even said that he was a football oracle".

In his later years, Ramón developed senile dementia, and on one occasion, his wife arrived home and did not find him there, so she quickly alerted their daughter, who found him in Mestalla, "in pajamas and slippers taking short walks waiting for it to open". He died in Valencia on 15 October 1999, at the age of 87.

== Legacy ==
Despite his pivotal role in Valencia's first golden team in the 1940s, Ramón has been rather forgotten, with his son stating that "in an Anglo-Saxon setting, Juan Ramón would have a statue at the gates of Mestalla, with rivers of ink having flowed about his adventures; there would be fan clubs named after him and young people today would know, even if vaguely, about him.

== Honours ==
Valencia CF

- Valencia Championship:
  - Champions (3): 1934, 1937, and 1940
- Copa del Rey:
  - Champions (2): 1941 and 1949
  - Runner-up (3): 1934, 1937, 1944
- La Liga:
  - Champions (3): 1941–42, 1943–44, and 1946–47
  - Runner-up (2): 1947–48 and 1948–49
- Copa Eva Duarte:
  - Champions (1): 1949
