= List of Valencia CF records and statistics =

Valencia Club de Fútbol (also known as Los Che) are a professional football club based in Valencia, Spain. This article contains honours won, and statistics and records pertaining to the club.

== Honours ==
=== National titles ===
- La Liga

Winners (6): 1941–42, 1943–44, 1946–47, 1970–71, 2001–02, 2003–04

Runners-up (6): 1947–48, 1948–49, 1952–53, 1971–72, 1989–90, 1995–96

Third place (10): 1940–41, 1949–50, 1950–51, 1953–54, 1988–89, 1999–2000, 2005–06, 2009–10, 2010–11, 2011–12

- Copa del Rey

Winners (8): 1941, 1948–49, 1954, 1966–67, 1978–79, 1998–99, 2007–08, 2018–19

Runners-up (10): 1934, 1944, 1944–45, 1946, 1952, 1969–70, 1970–71, 1971–72, 1994–95, 2021–22

- Supercopa de España

Winners: 1999
Runners-up (3): 2002, 2004, 2008

- Copa Eva Duarte (Predecessor to the Supercopa de España)

Winners: 1949
Runners-up: 1947

- Copa Presidente FEF (Predecessor to the Supercopa de España)

Runners-up: 1947

- Segunda División

Winners: 1930–31, 1986–87

=== European titles ===
- UEFA Champions League

Runners-up (2): 1999–2000, 2000–01

- UEFA Cup Winners' Cup

Winners: 1979–80

- UEFA Cup / UEFA Europa League

Winners: 2003–04
Semi-finals (3): 2011–12, 2013–14, 2018–19

- Inter-cities Fairs Cup:

Winners: 1961–62, 1962–63
Runners-up: 1963–64

- European Super Cup / UEFA Super Cup

Winners: 1980, 2004

- UEFA Intertoto Cup

Winners: 1998
Runners-up: 2005

=== Regional titles ===
- Levante Championship / Valencian Championship (10): 1922–23, 1924–25, 1925–26, 1926–27, 1930–31, 1931–32, 1932–33, 1933–34, 1936–37, 1939–40

=== Friendly competitions ===
- Naranja Trophy (33): 1961, 1962, 1970, 1975, 1978, 1979, 1980, 1983, 1984, 1988, 1989, 1991, 1993, 1994, 1996, 1998, 1999, 2001, 2002, 2006, 2008, 2009, 2010, 2011, 2012, 2013, 2014, 2016, 2018, 2021, 2022, 2024, 2025
- Ciudad de Valencia Trophy (4): 1988, 1990, 1993, 1994
- Copa Generalitat Trophy (3): 1999, 2001, 2002
- Ciudad de la Línea Trophy (2): 1970, 1993
- Martini Rossi Trophy (2): 1948–49, 1949–50
- Teresa Herrera Trophy (1): 1952
- Concepción Arenal Trophy (1): 1954
- Ciudad de México Trophy (1): 1966
- Ramón de Carranza Trophy (1): 1967
- Bodas de Oro Trophy (1): 1969
- Tournoi de Paris (1): 1975
- Ibérico Trophy (1): 1975
- Comunidad Valenciana Trophy (1): 1982
- 75 Aniversario Levante UD Trophy (1): 1984
- Teide Trophy (1): 1985
- Festa d'Elx Trophy (1): 1991
- Groningen Trophy (1): 1992
- La Laguna Trophy (1): 1992
- Ciudad de Palma Trophy (1): 1993
- Villa de Benidorm Trophy (1): 1993
- 80 Aniversario San Mamés Trophy (1): 1993
- Joan Gamper Trophy (1): 1994
- Ciudad de Alicante Trophy (1): 1994
- Ciudad de Benidorm Trophy (1): 1994
- Ciudad de Mérida Trophy (1): 1995
- Trofeu Ciutat de Barcelona (1): 1995
- Copa Fuji Trophy (1): 1997
- Trofeo de la Cerámica (1): 2001
- Ladbrokes.com cup Trophy (1): 2003
- Thomas Cook Trophy (1): 2007
- Borussia Dortmund 100th Anniversary tournament trophy (1): 2009
- Sparkasse Emsland Cup (1): 2009
- CD Acero 90th Anniversary Trophy (1): 2009
- Kärnten Soccer Cup (1): 2011
- Emirates Cup (1): 2014

== Recent seasons ==
Season	League									Cup	Europe		Other Comp.		Top scorer(s)	
Season	Div	P	W	D	L	GF	GA	Pts	Pos	Cup	Europe		Other Comp.		Player(s)	Goals
2013–14	1	38	13	10	15	51	53	49	8th	R16	Europa League	SF	–		Paco Alcácer	14
2014–15	1	38	22	11	5	70	32	77	4th	R16	–		–		Paco Alcácer	14
2015–16	1	38	11	11	16	46	48	44	12th	SF	Champions League Europa League	GS R16	–		Paco Alcácer	15
2016–17	1	38	13	7	18	56	65	46	12th	R16	–		–		Munir Rodrigo	7
2017–18	1	38	22	7	9	65	38	73	4th	SF	–		–		Rodrigo	19
2018–19	1	38	15	16	7	51	35	61	4th	W	Champions League Europa League	GS SF	–		Rodrigo	15
2019–20	1	38	14	11	13	46	53	53	9th	QF	Champions League	R16	Supercopa de España	SF	Maxi Gómez	11
2020–21	1	38	10	13	15	50	53	43	13th	R16	–		–		Carlos Soler	12
2021–22	1	38	11	15	12	48	53	43	9th	RU	–		–		Gonçalo Guedes	13
2022–23	1	38	11	9	18	42	45	42	16th	QF	–		Supercopa de España	SF	Justin Kluivert Samuel Lino	8

=== Statistics in La Liga ===
- Biggest home win: Valencia 8–0 Sporting de Gijón (29 November 1953)
- Biggest away win: Lleida 1–6 Valencia (4 February 1951) and Málaga 1–6 Valencia (31 January 2004)
- Biggest home defeat: Valencia 0–5 Real Madrid (20 January 2013)
- Biggest defeat: Sevilla 10–3 Valencia (13 October 1940) and Barcelona 7–0 Valencia (3 February 2016)
- Pichichi's won: Mundo (2): 1941–42 – 27 goals, 1943–44 – 27 goals; Ricardo Alos: 1957–58 – 19 goals; Waldo Machado: 1966–67 – 24 goals; Mario Kempes (2): 1976–77 – 24 goals, 1977–78 – 28 goals.
- Zamora's won: Ignacio Eizaguirre (2): 1943–44 – 32 goals conceded, 1944–45 – 28 goals conceded; Goyo: 1957–58 – 28 goals conceded; Ángel Abelardo: 1970–71 – 19 goals conceded; Jose Luis Manzanedo: 1978–79 – 26 goals conceded; José Manuel Ochotorena: 1988–89 – 25 goals conceded; Santiago Cañizares (3): 2000–01 – 34 goals conceded, 2001–02 – 23 goals conceded, 2003–04 – 25 goals conceded.
- Most games played: Fernando (554), Arias (518), David Albelda (485), Miguel Ángel Angulo (430)
- Most goals scored: Mundo (206), Waldo (158), Mario Kempes (146), Fernando (143)

=== Statistics in European competition ===
- Biggest win: Valencia 7–0 Genk (2011–12)
- Heaviest loss: Dunfermline Athletic 6–2 Valencia (1961–62); Valencia 1–5 Napoli (1992–93); Valencia 1–5 Internazionale (2004–05)

=== General statistics ===
- Most goals: Mundo 238 goals
- Most goals in a season: Mario Kempes 28 goals
- Most games: Fernando 554 games

=== Historical data ===
- First goal in VCF History: Pepe Llobet (25 May 1919), Valencia 1–1 Gimnastico CF

== Overall seasons table in La Liga ==
Pos.	Club	Season In D1	Pl.	W	D	L	GS	GA	Dif.	Pts	Champion	2nd place	3rd place	4th place
4	Valencia	88	2,892	1,270	687	935	4,700	3,746	954	3296	6	6	10	13

Last updated: 1 July 2023
Pos. = Position; Pl = Match played; W = Win; D = Draw; L = Lost; GS = Goals scored; GA = Goals against; P = Points.
Colors: Gold = winner; Silver = runner-up.

=== Milestone goals in La Liga ===
Goal Number	Date	Player	Match & result
1	29/11/1931	Navarro	VCF 5 – Real Irún 1
1000	12/10/1952	Fuertes	Espanyol 2 – VCF 5
2000	16/04/1972	Claramunt	VCF 2 – Sevilla 0
3000	09/01/1994	Pizzi	Real Valladolid 1 – VCF 1
4000	14/11/2010	Tino Costa	VCF 2 – Getafe 0

=== Milestone goals in UEFA Champions League/European Cup ===
Goal Number	Date	Player	Match and Result
1	19/08/1971	José Vicente Forment	VCF 3 – 1 Union Luxembourg
100	21/11/2006	Raúl Albiol	Olympiacos 2 – 4 VCF

== Appearance records ==
Competitive, professional matches only.

Rank	Name	Years	League	Cup	Europe^{[A]}	Other^{[B]}	Total
1	Fernando Gómez	1984–1998	421	73	20	40	554
2	Ricardo Arias	1976–1992	375	62	34	47	518
3	David Albelda	1997–2013	351	27	101	6	485
4	Miguel Ángel Angulo	1996–2009	312	29	83	6	430
5	Santiago Cañizares	1998–2008	305	10	97	6	418

== Goalscoring records ==
Competitive, professional matches only.

Rank	Name	Years	League	Cup	Europe^{[A]}	Other^{[B]}	Total
1	Edmundo Suárez	1939–1950	186	52	0	0	238
2	Waldo Machado	1962–1969	115	13	30	0	158
3	Mario Kempes	1977–1981; 1982–1984	116	17	13	0	146
4	Fernando Gómez	1984–1998	108	23	3	9	143
5	David Villa	2005–2010	107	4	16	2	129

=== Pichichi Trophy winners ===
	Player	Season	Goals
(Spain)	Mundo	1943–44	27
(Spain)	Ricardo Alós	1957–58	19
(Brazil)	Waldo	1966–67	24
(Argentina)	Mario Kempes	1976–77	24
(Argentina)	Mario Kempes	1977–78	28

=== Zamora Trophy winners ===
	Player	Season
(Spain)	Ignacio Eizaguirre	1943–44
(Spain)	Ignacio Eizaguirre	1944–45
(Spain)	Goyo	1957–58
(Spain)	Angel Abelardo	1970–71
(Spain)	José Luis Manzanedo	1978–79
(Spain)	José Manuel Ochotorena	1988–89
(Spain)	Santiago Cañizares	2000–01
(Spain)	Santiago Cañizares	2001–02
(Spain)	Santiago Cañizares	2003–04

== Transfer records ==
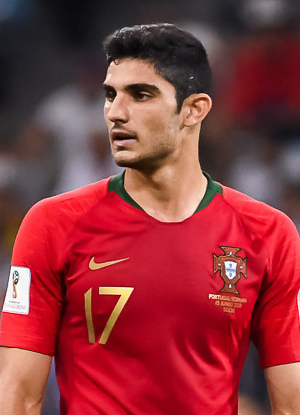
Gonçalo Guedes is the most expensive signing in Valencia's history, costing €40m in 2018.

Record transfer fees paid by Valencia
Rank	Player	Fee (€)	Paid to	Date
1	(Portugal) Gonçalo Guedes	40,000,000	(France) Paris Saint-Germain	2018
2	(Netherlands) Jasper Cillessen	35,000,000	(Spain) Barcelona	2019
3	(Spain) Rodrigo	30,000,000	(Portugal) Benfica	2015
4	(Spain) Álvaro Negredo	28,000,000	(England) Manchester City	2014
5	(Spain) Joaquín	25,000,000	(Spain) Real Betis	2006
5	(Argentina) Enzo Pérez	25,000,000	(Portugal) Benfica	2015
5	(Central African Republic) Geoffrey Kondogbia	25,000,000	(Italy) Internazionale	2018
8	(Argentina) Pablo Aimar	24,000,000	(Argentina) River Plate	2001
9	(Tunisia) Aymen Abdennour	22,000,000	(France) Monaco	2015
10	(Argentina) Ezequiel Garay	20,000,000	(Russia) Zenit Saint Petersburg	2016

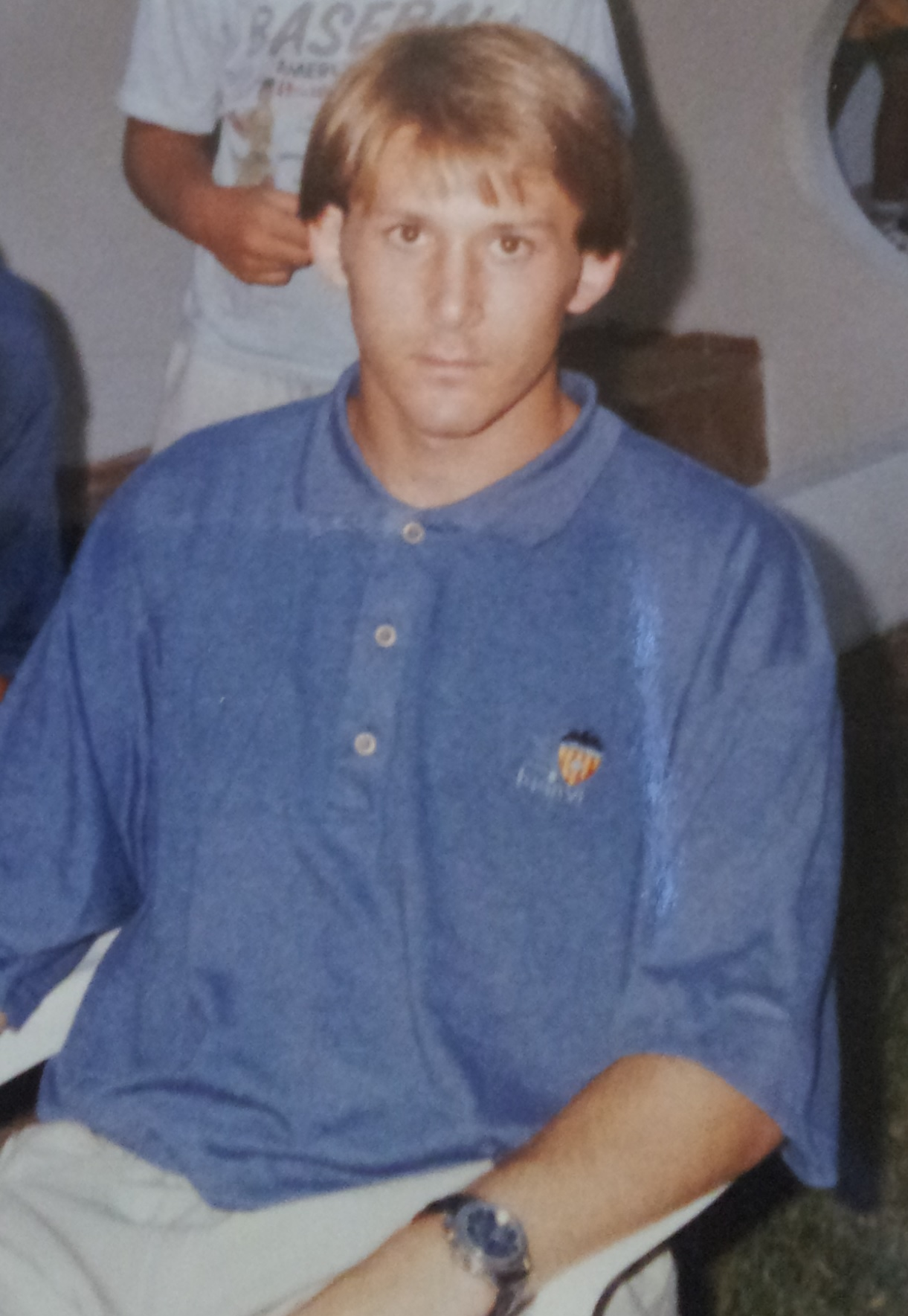
The largest transfer involving Valencia was the sale of Gaizka Mendieta to Lazio for €48 million in 2001.

Record transfer fees received by Valencia
Pos.	Player	Fee (€)	Received from	Date
1	(Spain) Gaizka Mendieta	48,000,000	(Italy) Lazio	2001
2	(Argentina) Nicolás Otamendi	45,000,000	(England) Manchester City	2015
3	(Portugal) Gonçalo Guedes	41,500,000	(England) Wolverhampton Wanderers	2022
4	(Germany) Shkodran Mustafi	41,000,000	(England) Arsenal	2016
5	(Portugal) João Cancelo	40,400,000	(Italy) Juventus	2018
6	(Spain) David Villa	40,000,000	(Spain) Barcelona	2010
7	(Portugal) André Gomes	35,000,000	(Spain) Barcelona	2016
8	(Spain) David Silva	33,000,000	(England) Manchester City	2010
9	(Argentina) Claudio López	32,000,000	(Italy) Lazio	2000
10	(Spain) Paco Alcácer	30,000,000	(Spain) Barcelona	2016
10	(Spain) Roberto Soldado	30,000,000	(England) Tottenham Hotspur	2013

== Footnotes ==
A. The "Europe" column constitutes goals and appearances in the UEFA Competition.
B. The "Other" column constitutes goals and appearances in the Segunda División, Supercopa de España and the Copa de la Liga.
