= 1941 Copa del Generalísimo final =

Copa del Generalísimo 1941 final
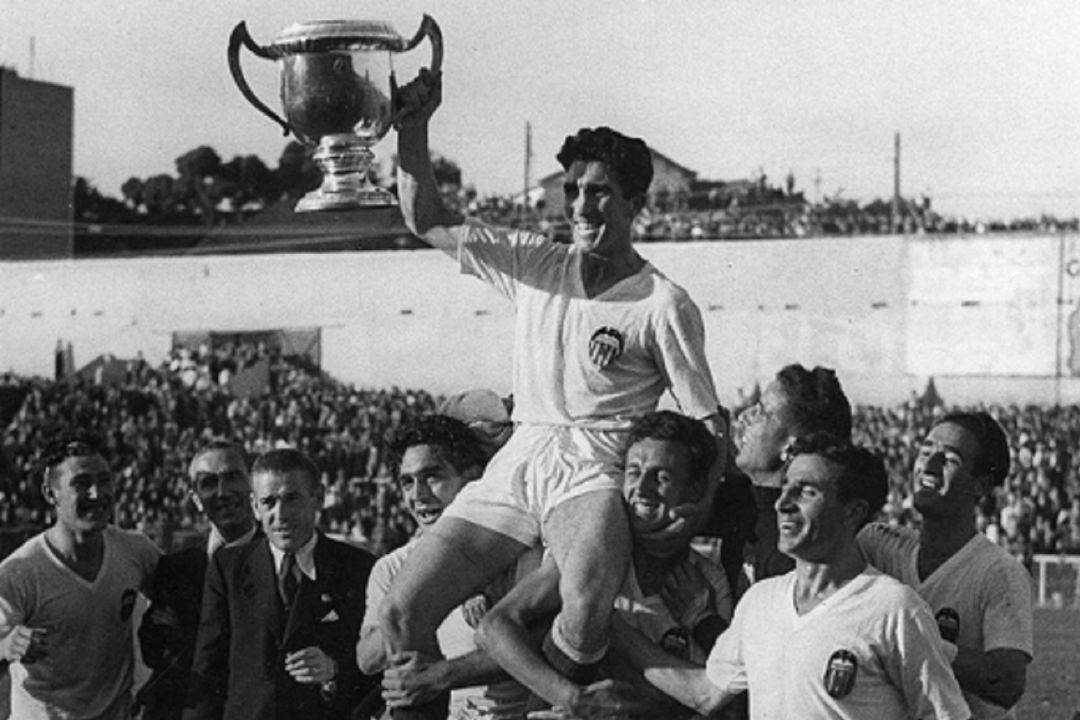
- Players of Valencia celebrating their first Copa del Rey title
- Event: 1941 Copa del Generalísimo
Valencia	RCD Espanyol
3	1
- Date: 29 June 1941
- Venue: Estadio Chamartín, Madrid
- Referee: Eduardo Iturralde
- Attendance: 23,000

The Copa del Generalísimo 1941 final was the 39th final of the King's Cup. The final was played at Estadio Chamartín in Madrid, on 29 June 1941, being won by Valencia, who beat RCD Espanyol 3-1.

== Match details ==
29 June 1941
17:30 CET

Valencia	3–1	RCD Espanyol
Mundo 9', 25'; Asensi 64'	Report	Teruel 74' (pen.)

Estadio Chamartín, Madrid
Attendance: 23,000
Referee: Eduardo Iturralde

Valencia

RCD Espanyol

GK	1	(Spain) Pío Bau
DF	2	(Spain) Álvaro
DF	3	(Spain) Juan Ramón (c)
MF	4	(Spain) Inocencio Bertolí
MF	5	(Spain) Vicente Sierra
MF	6	(Spain) Lelé
FW	7	(Spain) Epi
FW	8	(Spain) Amadeo
FW	9	(Spain) Mundo
FW	10	(Spain) Vicente Asensi
FW	11	(Spain) Guillermo Gorostiza
Manager:
(Spain) Ramón Encinas

GK	1	(Spain) Alberto Martorell
DF	2	(Spain) Ricardo Teruel
DF	3	(Spain) Benito Pérez (c)
MF	4	(Spain) Jaime Arasa
MF	5	(Spain) Isidro Rovira
MF	6	(Spain) Félix Llimós
FW	7	(Spain) Makala
FW	8	(Spain) Gabriel Jorge
FW	9	(Spain) Antonio Chas
FW	10	(Spain) Eduardo Olivas
FW	11	(Spain) Francisco Mas
Manager:
(Spain) Patricio Caicedo
