= 1944 Copa del Generalísimo final =

Copa del Generalísimo 1944 final
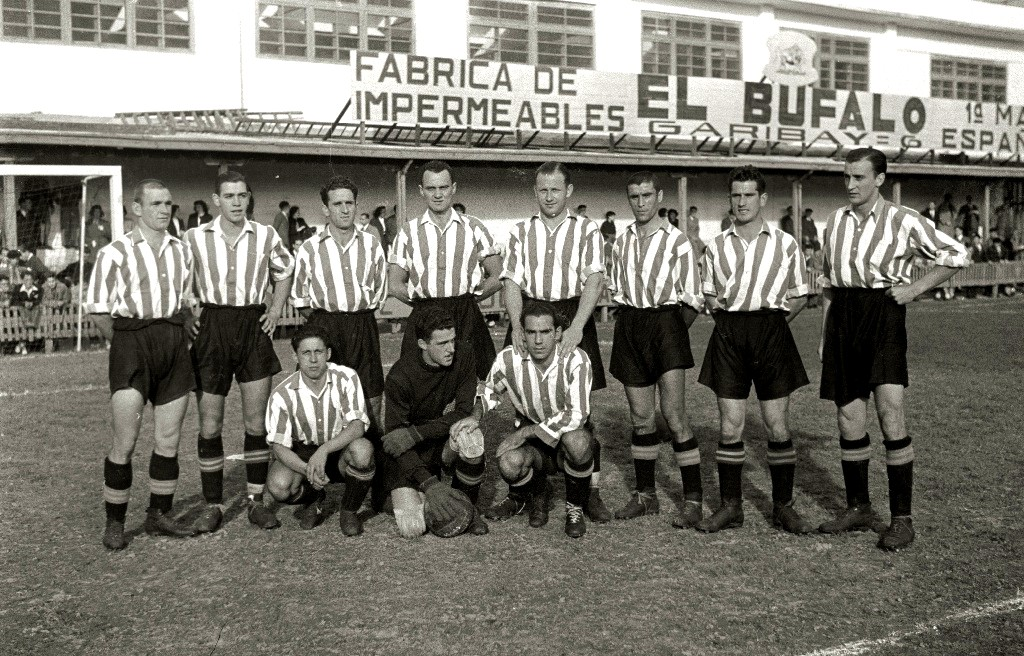
- An Athletic Bilbao team of 1944
- Event: 1944 Copa del Generalísimo
Athletic Bilbao	Valencia
2	0
- Date: 25 June 1944
- Venue: Montjuïc, Barcelona
- Referee: Agustín Vilalta
- Attendance: 65,000

The Copa del Generalísimo 1944 final was the 42nd final of the King's Cup. The final was played at Montjuïc in Barcelona, on 25 June 1944, being won by Athletic Bilbao, who beat Valencia 2-0.

== Match details ==
25 June 1944
18:30 CET

Athletic Bilbao	2–0	Valencia
Zarra 30'; Escudero 44'	Report

Montjuïc, Barcelona
Attendance: 65,000
Referee: Agustín Vilalta

Athletic Bilbao
Valencia

GK	1	(Spain) Raimundo Lezama
DF	2	(Spain) Salvador Arqueta
DF	3	(Spain) Isaac Oceja (c)
MF	4	(Spain) Francisco Celaya
MF	5	(Spain) Roberto Bertol
MF	6	(Spain) Nando
FW	7	(Spain) Rafael Iriondo
FW	8	(Spain) José Luis Panizo
FW	9	(Spain) Telmo Zarra
FW	10	(Spain) Rafael Escudero
FW	11	(Spain) Agustín Gaínza
Manager:
(Spain) Juan Urquizu

GK	1	(Spain) Ignacio Eizaguirre
DF	2	(Spain) Álvaro
DF	3	(Spain) Juan Ramón (c)
MF	4	(Chile) Higinio Ortúzar
MF	5	(Spain) Carlos Iturraspe
MF	6	(Spain) Simón Lecue
FW	7	(Spain) Epi
FW	8	(Spain) Vicente Hernández
FW	9	(Spain) Mundo
FW	10	(Spain) Silvestre Igoa
FW	11	(Spain) Vicente Asensi
Manager:
(Spain) Eduardo Cubells
