= Mariano Martín =

Spanish footballer (1919–1998)

Personal information
- Full name: Mariano Martín Alonso
- Date of birth: 20 October 1919
- Place of birth: Dueñas, Spain
- Date of death: 9 September 1998 (aged 78)
- Place of death: Cabrils, Spain
- Position: Striker

Youth career
- Peña Font

Senior career*
Years	Team	Apps	(Gls)
1936–1939	Sant Andreu		
1939–1948	Barcelona	112	(97)
1948–1949	Gimnàstic	18	(8)
1949–1950	Zaragoza	4	(0)
1950–1952	Sant Andreu	47	(34)
Total		181	(141)

International career
1942–1946	Spain	3	(0)
- * Club domestic league appearances and goals

Mariano Martín Alonso (20 October 1919 – 9 September 1998) was a Spanish footballer who played as a striker.

== Club career ==
Martín was born in Dueñas, Palencia. After his beginnings with Peña Font, already in Barcelona, he joined FC Barcelona in 1939, proceeding to become one of the club's most prolific scorers; during his nine seasons at Barcelona, he netted 128 times in only 150 matches, including 30 in 23 contests in his fourth season, although Barça finished in third place, despite this he was rewarded with the Pichichi Trophy of that year.

In early 1944, whilst appearing in a friendly match for Catalonia, Martín suffered a severe knee ligament injury, from which he never fully recovered. However, as he played in only 29 La Liga games in his last three seasons combined, he still managed to score on 14 occasions.

Martín closed out his career in 1952, after one year apiece with Gimnàstic de Tarragona and Real Zaragoza and as many with his second club, UE Sant Andreu. He died at almost 79, still living in Catalonia (Cabrils).

== International career ==
Martín earned three caps for Spain, during four years. His debut came on 12 April 1942 in Milan, during a 1–1 friendly draw with Germany.

== Career statistics ==
Appearances and goals by club, season and competition
Club	Season	League		Cup		Other		Total	
Club	Season	Apps	Goals	Apps	Goals	Apps	Goals	Apps	Goals
Barcelona	1939–40	3	0			–			
Barcelona	1940–41	14	12			–			
Barcelona	1941–42	23	17		4	–			21
Barcelona	1942–43	23	30		12	–			42
Barcelona	1943–44	20	24		4	–			28
Barcelona	1944–45	11	4			–			
Barcelona	1945–46	15	9			1	0		
Barcelona	1946–47	3	1			–			
Barcelona	1947–48	0	0			–			
Barcelona	Total	112	97			1	0		
Gimnàstic	1948–49	18	8			–			
Career total		130	105			1	0		

== Honours ==
Barcelona

- La Liga: 1944–45
- Copa del Generalísimo: 1942

Individual

- Pichichi Trophy: 1942–43
