= Ignacio Eizaguirre =

Spanish football player and manager

Personal information
- Full name: Ignacio Eizaguirre Arregui
- Date of birth: 7 November 1920
- Place of birth: San Sebastián, Spain
- Date of death: 1 September 2013 (aged 92)
- Place of death: San Sebastián, Spain
- Height: 1.81 m (5 ft 11 in)
- Position: Goalkeeper

Youth career
- Arenas Concha
- Cuento Rentería
- Lagun Artea
- 1936–1939: Real Sociedad

Senior career*
Years	Team	Apps	(Gls)
1939–1940	Real Sociedad		
1940–1950	Valencia	197	(0)
1950–1956	Real Sociedad	107	(0)
1956–1960	Osasuna	87	(0)
Total		381	(0)

International career
1945–1952	Spain	18	(0)

Managerial career
- 1959–1960: Osasuna (player-coach)
- 1960–1962: Murcia
- 1962–1963: Celta
- 1963–1964: Granada
- 1964–1965: Córdoba
- 1965–1966: Sevilla
- 1967–1969: Celta
- 1969–1970: Córdoba
- 1970–1971: Burgos
- 1971–1972: Hércules
- 1973: Tenerife
- 1973: Burgos
- 1975: Alavés
- 1975–1977: Córdoba
- * Club domestic league appearances and goals

Ignacio Eizaguirre Arregui (7 November 1920 – 1 September 2013) was a Spanish footballer who played as a goalkeeper.

He played 381 La Liga games during 19 seasons, representing Real Sociedad, Valencia and Osasuna. He was a Spanish international for seven years, and appeared for the country at the 1950 World Cup.

== Club career ==
Born in San Sebastián, Gipuzkoa, Eizaguirre signed with Real Sociedad in 1936, but no football was played in the country from that year and 1939 due to the Spanish Civil War. He made his debuts with the club in Segunda División and, after one season, reached La Liga as he moved to Valencia CF.

With the Che, Eizaguirre – who did not lineup in his first year due to suspension – won his three national championships in his first six seasons, conquering two Ricardo Zamora Trophy awards in the process. After one full decade he returned to his native Basque Country and Real Sociedad, for a further six top flight campaigns.

Eizaguirre retired at the age of nearly 40 after four seasons with CA Osasuna, still in the main category – before the last one, 1959–60, ended, he was named the club's player-coach, as the campaign ended in relegation for the Navarrese. He worked as a manager until the late 70s, with Córdoba CF, Sevilla FC and Granada CF in the top division and a host of teams in the second level.

== International career ==
Eizaguirre won the first of his 18 caps for Spain on 11 March 1945, in a 2–2 friendly draw with Portugal in Lisbon. He was chosen by manager Guillermo Eizaguirre (no relation) for his 1950 FIFA World Cup squad, and in Brazil he featured against the United States (3–1 first group stage win) and Sweden (1–3 second group stage loss) for the eventual fourth-placed team.

== Personal life and death ==
Eizaguirre's father, Agustín, was also a footballer and a goalkeeper. He played solely for Real Sociedad.

Ignacio died on 1 September 2013 in his hometown of San Sebastián, aged 92.

== Honours ==
Valencia

- La Liga: 1941–42, 1943–44, 1946–47
- Copa del Generalísimo: 1949
- Copa Eva Duarte: 1949

Individual

- Ricardo Zamora Trophy: 1943–44, 1944–45
