= Mario Kempes =

Argentine footballer and manager (born 1954)

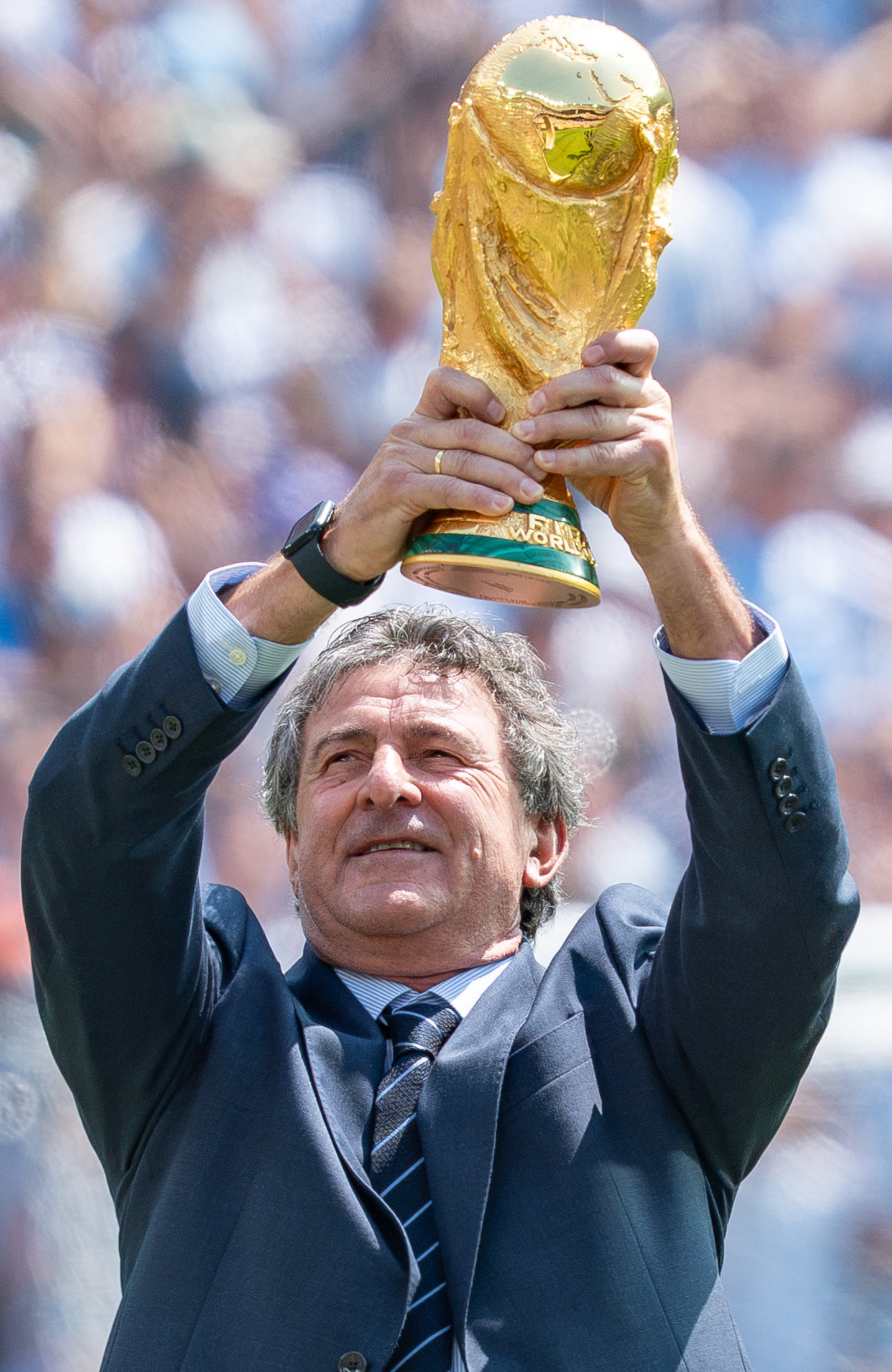
- Kempes in 2026

Personal information
- Full name: Mario Alberto Kempes
- Date of birth: 15 July 1954 (age 72)
- Place of birth: Bell Ville, Córdoba, Argentina
- Height: 1.84 m (6 ft 0 in)
- Positions: Striker; attacking midfielder

Youth career
- 1961–1968: Biblioteca Bell
- 1968–1969: Talleres
- 1969–1973: Instituto

Senior career*
Years	Team	Apps	(Gls)
1973–1974	Instituto	13	(11)
1974–1976	Rosario Central	107	(89)
1976–1981	Valencia	142	(95)
1981–1982	River Plate	29	(15)
1982–1984	Valencia	42	(21)
1984–1986	Hércules	38	(10)
1986–1987	First Vienna	20	(7)
1987–1990	St. Pölten	96	(34)
1990–1992	Krems	39	(7)
1995	Fernández Vial	11	(5)
1995–1996	Pelita Jaya	15	(10)
1996	Lushnja		
Total		552	(304)

International career
1973–1982	Argentina	43	(20)

Managerial career
- 1995–1996: Pelita Jaya
- 1996: Lushnja
- 1997–1998: Mineros
- 1999: The Strongest
- 2000: Blooming
- 2000–2001: Independiente Petrolero
- 2001–2002: Casarano
- 2002: San Fernando
Medal record
Men's football
Representing Argentina
FIFA World Cup
Winner	1978 Argentina
- * Club domestic league appearances and goals

Mario Alberto Kempes (Spanish pronunciation: [ˈmaɾjo alˈβeɾto ˈkempes]; born 15 July 1954) is an Argentine former professional footballer who played as a striker or attacking midfielder. A prolific goalscorer, he finished as La Liga's top goalscorer twice with Valencia where he amassed 116 goals in 184 league games. He is regarded as one of the greatest strikers of all time.

At international level, Kempes was the focal point of Argentina's 1978 FIFA World Cup win where he scored twice in the final and received the Golden Boot as top goalscorer. He also won the Golden Ball for the player of the tournament, making him one of only three players to have won all three awards at a single World Cup, along with Garrincha in 1962 and Paolo Rossi in 1982.

Kempes won South American Footballer of the Year, Onze d'Or European Footballer of the Year and World Cup Golden Ball in 1978. In 2004, he was named as one of the Top 125 greatest living footballers as part of FIFA's 100th anniversary celebration. Kempes was nicknamed El Toro and El Matador.

== Early life ==
Mario Alberto Kempes was born on 15 July 1954 in Bell Ville, a city in the province of Córdoba in Argentina. His father, Mario Quemp, was of German heritage. His mother, Teresa Chiodi, was Italian. At the age of seven he began playing with a junior team and at fourteen he joined the Talleres reserves.

== Club career ==
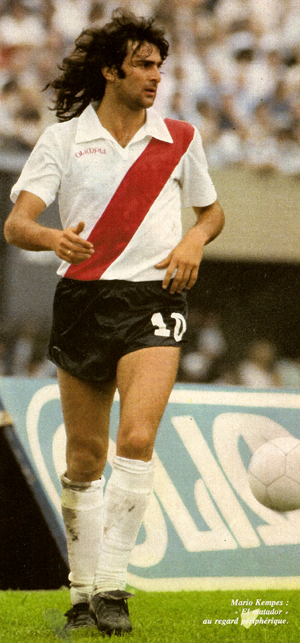
Mario Kempes during his period in River Plate, 1981

Kempes' career started at local club Instituto, where he played alongside Osvaldo Ardiles before quickly moving on to Rosario Central, where he established himself as a remarkable goalscorer, scoring 85 goals in 105 matches, prompting Valencia to sign him. At Mestalla he would go on to win the Copa del Rey, the European Cup Winners' Cup and the European Super Cup as well as two consecutive Pichichis, scoring 24 and 28 goals in the 1976–77 and 1977–78 seasons. Famous as a hard-working forward, he used to strike from outside the penalty area with his surging runs towards goal and was not the traditional center-forward operating solely inside the box. Many defenders found difficulty handling his attacking style.

Before the 1978 World Cup, Kempes was the only foreign-based player on the list of coach César Luis Menotti's Argentina national team. When announcing the squad he had selected for the 1978 tournament, Menotti described him with these words: "He's strong, he's got skill, he creates spaces and he shoots hard. He's a player who can make a difference, and he can play in a centre-forward position."

Kempes had been the top scorer in La Liga the previous two seasons and was determined to show on home soil that he could deliver against the best on the sport's greatest stage. However, he had failed to get on the score-sheet in West Germany in 1974, at the age of 19, and after the first round group stage in 1978, his name was still missing among goalscorers in the tournament.

After leaving Valencia in 1984, Kempes spent two years at Hércules in nearby Alicante before spending six years at various Austrian clubs. His play declined in his 30s and he did not compete for top scorer honours in the Austrian top flight. He rounded off his career with stints at more obscure clubs in Indonesia, Chile and Albania during the 1990s.

== International career ==
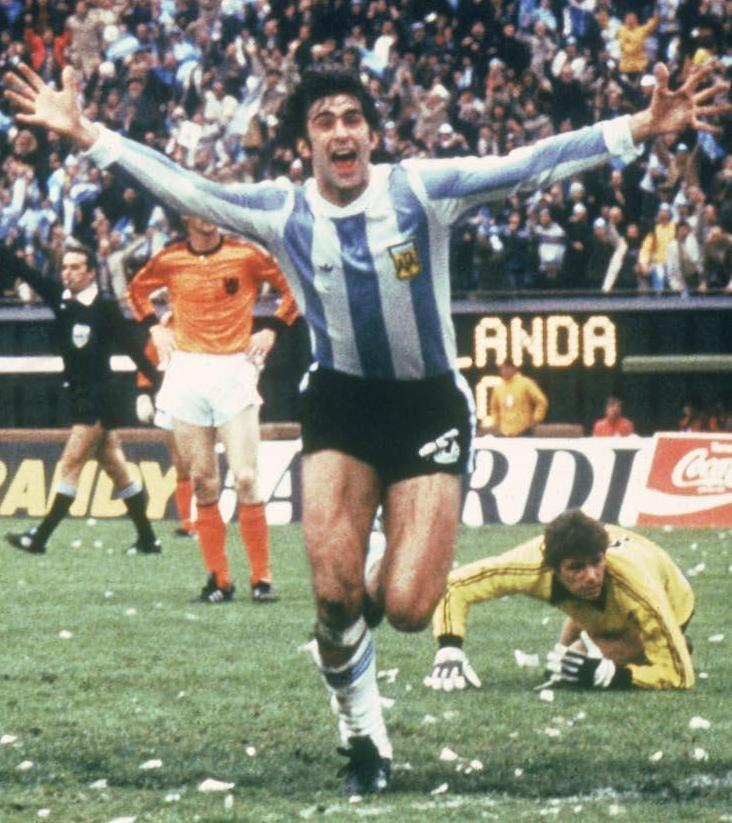
Kempes celebrating one of his two goals at the 1978 FIFA World Cup final against Netherlands in Buenos Aires

During his club career he won 43 caps for Argentina and scored 20 times. He represented his country in three World Cups in 1974, 1978 and 1982, winning the competition in 1978. He was the leading goalscorer in the 1978 tournament, scoring six goals in three braces: the first two in Argentina's first semi-final group stage match against Poland, another two against Peru, and the last two in the final against the Netherlands, which Argentina won 3–1. His second goal, in the 105th minute, was the game winner in extra time. However, in the same tournament, he notoriously stopped a goal with his hand in a second-round match against Poland. This resulted in a penalty kick that was promptly saved by Ubaldo Fillol. His goals in the 1978 World Cup Final were his last for Argentina at the age of just 23.

In 1978, he was named South American Football Player of the Year ("El Mundo," Caracas, Venezuela). He was named by Pelé as one of the top 125 greatest living footballers in March 2004.

== Style of play ==
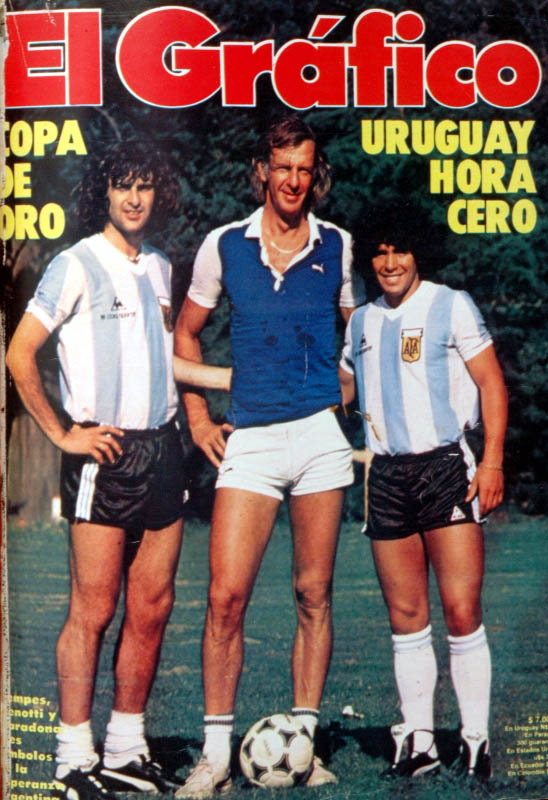
Kempes on the cover of El Gráfico alongside Menotti and Maradona

Kempes was a box number 9 who stood out for his left foot, goal-scoring prowess, speed, and skill. His reaction time, combined with his physical condition and shot ability, made him a striker. He also possessed a lethal header.

== Managerial career ==
Kempes made his full-time managing debut in Albania. His brief spell with Lushnja was groundbreaking, as he became the first foreign manager who signed a foreign player in Albanian football history. His career in Albania came to a quick end in 1997. The following year, he landed a job with Venezuelan side Mineros de Guayana. In 1999, Kempes moved to Bolivia and managed The Strongest, before taking charge of Blooming in 2000. Previously, he had worked as assistant coach for Uruguayan manager Héctor Núñez in Valencia and as a player-manager of Indonesian League champions Pelita Jaya.

== Broadcasting career ==
He currently works as a football analyst and commentator in Spanish for ESPN Deportes (ESPN's Spanish-language version). With Fernando Palomo and Ciro Procuna, he provides the commentary in the Latin American version of the FIFA franchise video games starting from FIFA 13 up until FIFA 23. He also serves as a commentator on the EA Sports FC series, beginning with EA Sports FC 24.

== Career statistics ==
=== Club ===
Appearances and goals by club, season and competition
Club	Season	League			Cup		Continental		Other		Total	
Club	Season	Division	Apps	Goals	Apps	Goals	Apps	Goals	Apps	Goals	Apps	Goals
Instituto	1973	Primera División	13	11	—	—	—	—	—	—	13	11
Central	1974	Primera División	36	30	—	—	7	3	—	—	43	33
Central	1975	Primera División	49	38	—	—	9	5	—	—	58	43
Central	1976	Primera División	22	21	—	—	—	—	—	—	22	21
Central	Total		107	89	—	—	16	8	—	—	123	97
Valencia	1976–77	La Liga	34	24	0	0	—	—	—	—	34	24
Valencia	1977–78	La Liga	34	28	12	11	—	—	—	—	46	39
Valencia	1978–79	La Liga	30	15	10	3	6	3	—	—	46	21
Valencia	1979–80	La Liga	32	22	2	2	9	9	—	—	43	33
Valencia	1980–81	La Liga	12	9	1	0	5	2	—	—	18	11
Valencia	Total		142	95	25	16	20	14	—	—	187	125
River Plate	1981	Primera División	29	15	—	—	4	1	—	—	33	16
River Plate	1982	Primera División	0	0	—	—	—	—	—	—	0	0
River Plate	Total		29	15	—	—	4	1	—	—	33	16
Valencia	1982–83	La Liga	27	13	1	0	8	0	2	0	38	13
Valencia	1983–84	La Liga	15	8	4	3	0	0	2	0	21	11
Valencia	Total		42	21	5	3	8	0	4	0	59	24
Hércules	1984–85	La Liga	17	1	2	0	—	—	—	—	19	1
Hércules	1985–86	La Liga	21	9	2	1	—	—	—	—	23	10
Hércules	Total		38	10	4	1	—	—	—	—	42	11
First Vienna	1986–87	Austrian Bundesliga	20	7	—	—	—	—	—	—	20	7
Sankt Pölten	1987–88	Austrian First League	32	10	—	—	—	—	—	—	32	10
Sankt Pölten	1988–89	Austrian Bundesliga	29	9	—	—	—	—	—	—	29	9
Sankt Pölten	1989–90	Austrian Bundesliga	35	15	—	—	—	—	—	—	35	15
Sankt Pölten	Total		96	34	—	—	—	—	—	—	96	34
Kremser SC	1990–91	Austrian Bundesliga	21	5	—	—	—	—	—	—	21	5
Kremser SC	1991–92	Austrian Bundesliga	18	2	—	—	—	—	—	—	18	2
Kremser SC	Total		39	7	—	—	—	—	—	—	39	7
Fernández Vial	1995	Primera B	11	5	—	—	—	—	—	—	11	5
Pelita Jaya	1996	Liga Indonesia	15	10	—	—	—	—	—	—	15	10
Career total			552	304	34	20	48	23	4	0	638	347

=== International ===
Appearances and goals by national team and year
National team	Year	Apps	Goals
Argentina	1973	1	0
Argentina	1974	10	4
Argentina	1975	4	3
Argentina	1976	9	7
Argentina	1977	0	0
Argentina	1978	7	6
Argentina	1979	0	0
Argentina	1980	0	0
Argentina	1981	3	0
Argentina	1982	9	0
Total		43	20

Scores and results list Argentina's goal tally first, score column indicates score after each Kempes goal.

List of international goals scored by Mario Kempes
No.	Date	Venue	Opponent	Score	Result	Competition
1	22 April 1974	José Amalfitani Stadium, Buenos Aires, Argentina	Romania	2–1	2–1	Friendly
2	18 May 1974	Parc des Princes, Paris, France	France	1–0	1–0	Friendly
3	22 May 1974	Wembley Stadium, London, England	England	1–2	2–2	Friendly
4	22 May 1974	Wembley Stadium, London, England	England	2–2	2–2	Friendly
5	3 August 1975	Estadio Olímpico, Caracas, Venezuela	Venezuela	2–1	5–1	1975 Copa América
6	10 August 1975	Estadio Gigante de Arroyito, Rosario, Argentina	Venezuela	5–0	11–0	1975 Copa América
7	10 August 1975	Estadio Gigante de Arroyito, Rosario, Argentina	Venezuela	10–0	11–0	1975 Copa América
8	27 February 1976	Estadio Monumental Antonio Vespucio Liberti, Buenos Aires, Argentina	Brazil	2–1	2–1	Roca Cup 1976
9	20 March 1976	Central Stadium, Kyiv, Ukraine	Soviet Union	1–0	1–0	Friendly
10	14 June 1978	Estadio Gigante de Arroyito, Rosario, Argentina	Poland	1–0	2–0	1978 FIFA World Cup
11	14 June 1978	Estadio Gigante de Arroyito, Rosario, Argentina	Poland	2–0	2–0	1978 FIFA World Cup
12	21 June 1978	Estadio Gigante de Arroyito, Rosario, Argentina	Peru	1–0	6–0	1978 FIFA World Cup
13	21 June 1978	Estadio Gigante de Arroyito, Rosario, Argentina	Peru	3–0	6–0	1978 FIFA World Cup
14	25 June 1978	Estadio Monumental Antonio Vespucio Liberti, Buenos Aires, Argentina	Netherlands	1–0	3–1	1978 FIFA World Cup
15	25 June 1978	Estadio Monumental Antonio Vespucio Liberti, Buenos Aires, Argentina	Netherlands	2–1	3–1	1978 FIFA World Cup

== Honours ==
Rosario Central

- Primera División runner-up: 1974 Metropolitano, 1976 Argentine Primera Division Nacional

Valencia

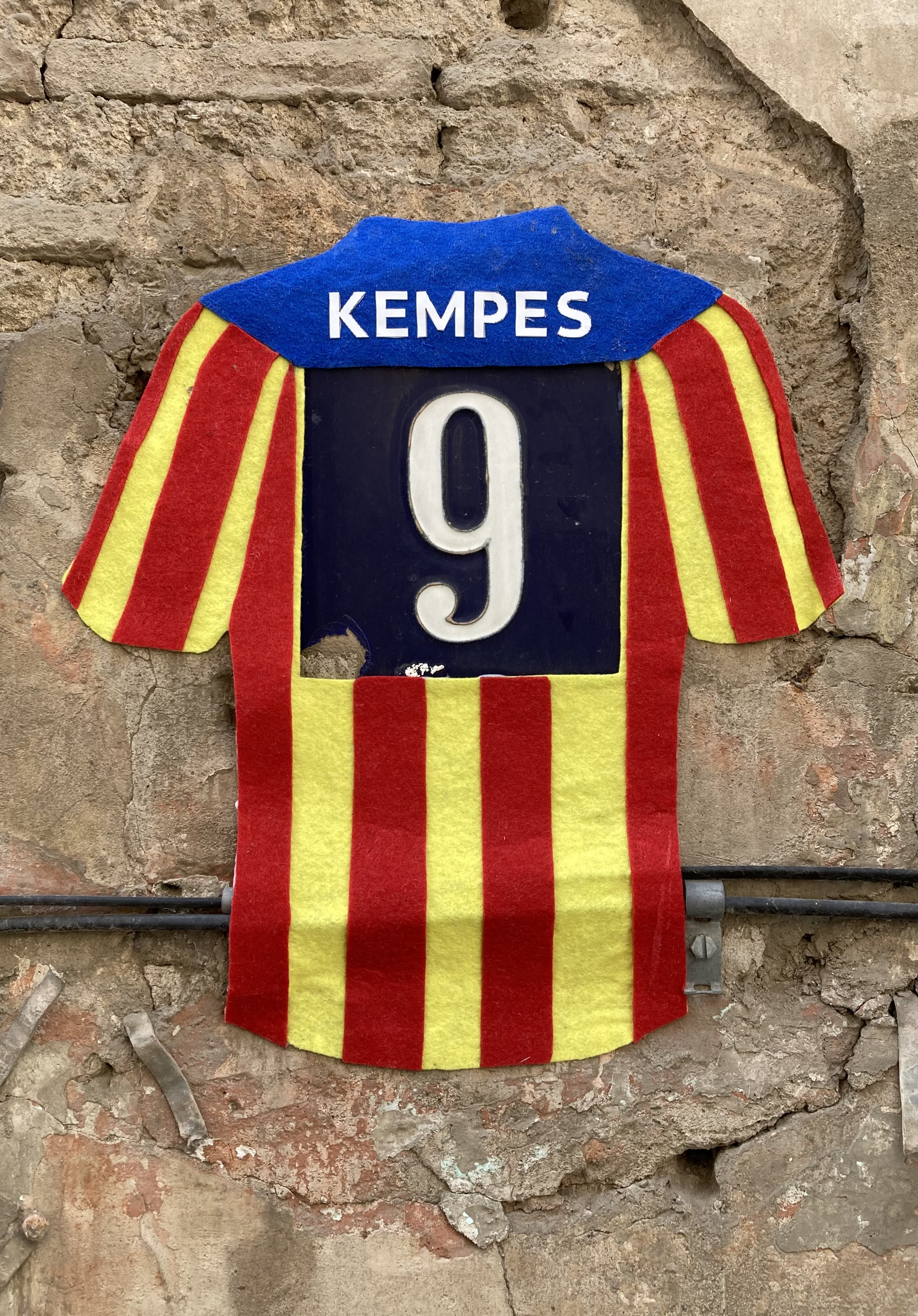
Street art depicting the Kempes #9 shirt worn at the 1979 Copa del Rey final

- Copa del Rey: 1978–79
- European Cup Winners' Cup: 1979–80
- European Super Cup: 1980

River Plate

- Primera División: 1981 Nacional

Pelita Jaya

- Galatama: 1993–94

Argentina

- FIFA World Cup: 1978

Individual

- Argentine Primera División top scorers: 1974 Nacional, 1976 Metropolitan
- Pichichi Trophy: 1977, 1978
- FIFA World Cup Golden Boot: 1978
- FIFA World Cup Golden Ball: 1978
- FIFA World Cup All-Star Team: 1978
- Ballon d'Or: 1978 - Le nouveau palmarès (the new winners)
- Onze d'Or: 1978
- Olimpia de Plata: 1978
- South American Footballer of the Year: 1978
- UEFA Cup Winners' Cup top scorers: 1979–80
- FIFA 100: 2004
- South American Player of the Century: Ranking Nº 23: 2006
- Golden Foot: 2007, as football legend
- Estadio Mario Alberto Kempes: 2010, The stadium in Córdoba, Argentina was named after him.
- AFA Team of All Time (published 2015)
- IFFHS Argentina All Times Dream Team (Team B): 2021

== See also ==
- List of La Liga top scorers
- List of foreign La Liga players
- List of FIFA World Cup top goalscorers
- List of Valencia CF records and statistics
