= Silvestre Igoa =

Spanish footballer

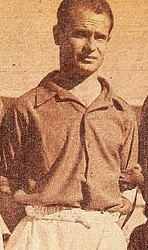

Personal information
- Full name: Silvestre Igoa Garciandia
- Date of birth: 5 September 1920
- Place of birth: Añorga, Spain
- Date of death: 31 May 1969 (aged 48)
- Place of death: San Sebastián, Spain
- Position: Forward

Youth career
- Beti Alai
- Catarroja

Senior career*
Years	Team	Apps	(Gls)
1941–1950	Valencia	168	(81)
1950–1956	Real Sociedad	116	(60)
1956–1957	Granada	23	(12)
Total		307	(153)

International career
1949	Spain B	1	(2)
1948–1950	Spain	10	(7)
- * Club domestic league appearances and goals

Silvestre Igoa Garciandia (5 September 1920 – 31 May 1969) was a Spanish footballer. He played for Spain in the 1950 FIFA World Cup, scoring two goals. He played for Valencia CF from 1941 to 1950.

== International goals ==
#	Date	Venue	Opponent	Score	Result	Competition
1.	30 May 1948	Montjuïc, Barcelona, Spain	Republic of Ireland	1–1	2–1	International Friendly
2.	30 May 1948	Montjuïc, Barcelona, Spain	Republic of Ireland	2–1	2–1	International Friendly
3.	20 June 1948	Hardturm, Zürich, Switzerland	Switzerland	0–2	3–3	International Friendly
4.	20 June 1948	Hardturm, Zürich, Switzerland	Switzerland	2–3	3–3	International Friendly
5.	12 June 1949	Dalymount Park, Dublin, Republic of Ireland	Republic of Ireland	1–4	1–4	International Friendly
6.	25 June 1950	Durival de Britto, Curitiba, Brazil	United States	1–1	3–1	1950 FIFA World Cup
7.	13 July 1950	Maracanã, Rio de Janeiro, Brazil	Brazil	6–1	6–1	1950 FIFA World Cup

== Honours ==
Valencia CF

- Spanish League: 1941–42, 1943–44, 1946–47
- Spanish Cup: 1948–49
- Copa Eva Duarte: 1949
