= Harry Bagge =

English footballer and manager

Personal information
- Full name: Henry John Bagge
- Date of birth: 15 September 1896
- Place of birth: Tottenham, England
- Date of death: 27 April 1967 (aged 70)
- Height: 5 ft 9 in (1.75 m)
- Position: Wing half

Senior career*
Years	Team	Apps	(Gls)
1914–1919	Tottenham Hotspur	0	(0)
1919–1926	Fulham	179	(1)
1926–	Northfleet United		
1927	→ The Wednesday (loan)	0	(0)
1928	Clapton Orient		
1928–1934	Athletic Bilbao		
- Hinckley Amateurs

Managerial career
- 1947–1949: Athletic Bilbao
- 1950–1951: Salamanca
- 1951–1952: RB Linense
- * Club domestic league appearances and goals

Henry John Bagge (15 September 1896 – 27 April 1967) was an English professional footballer who made over 170 appearances in the Football League for Fulham as a wing half. He later managed Spanish clubs Athletic Bilbao, Salamanca and RB Linense. He was described as "a consistent player who feeds his forwards with discrimination".

== Personal life ==
In December 1915, over a year after Britain's entry into the First World War, Bagge attested in the Royal Naval Air Service. He served as an Air Mechanic 2nd Class through the war and later in the Royal Air Force, before being transferred to the RAF Reserve in March 1919.

== Career statistics ==
Appearances and goals by club, season and competition
Club	Season	League			FA Cup		Total	
Club	Season	Division	Apps	Goals	Apps	Goals	Apps	Goals
Fulham	1919–20	Second Division	7	0	0	0	7	0
Fulham	1920–21	Second Division	35	0	5	0	40	0
Fulham	1921–22	Second Division	31	0	3	0	34	0
Fulham	1922–23	Second Division	30	0	1	0	31	0
Fulham	1923–24	Second Division	40	1	3	0	43	1
Fulham	1924–25	Second Division	26	0	0	0	26	0
Fulham	1925–26	Second Division	10	0	0	0	10	0
Career total			179	1	12	0	191	1
