= Telmo Zarra =

Spanish footballer (1921–2006)

- Zarra in 1950

Personal information
- Full name: Pedro Telmo Zarraonandía Montoya
- Date of birth: 20 January 1921
- Place of birth: Erandio, Kingdom of Spain
- Date of death: 23 February 2006 (aged 85)
- Place of death: Bilbao, Spain
- Height: 1.80 m (5 ft 11 in)
- Position: Forward

Senior career*
Years	Team	Apps	(Gls)
1939–1940	Erandio	20	(12)
1940–1955	Athletic Bilbao	277	(251)
1955–1956	Indautxu	14	(3)
1956–1957	Barakaldo	12	(2)
Total		323	(268)

International career
1945–1951	Spain	20	(20)
- * Club domestic league appearances and goals

Pedro Telmo Zarraonandía Montoya (20 January 1921 – 23 February 2006), known as Telmo Zarra (Basque: [ˈs̻ara], Spanish: [ˈθara]), was a Spanish football forward. He spent the majority of his career at Athletic Bilbao, from 1940 to 1955, for whom he remains the top scorer in competitive matches with 335 goals.

Zarra signed for Athletic after playing one season for Erandio. He became a prolific goalscorer in his 15 seasons at the club, winning the Pichichi Trophy as the highest scorer in La Liga on six occasions. During his career, Zarra scored a total of 251 league goals, a Spanish record that lasted nearly six decades before being broken by Lionel Messi. His 81 goals in the Copa del Rey remain a record.

Despite his goalscoring records, he only played for Spain 20 times. Even so, he still managed to score 20 goals, including four in one match as Spain beat Switzerland 6–3 on 18 February 1951. He also scored his country's winning goal against England in the 1950 World Cup finals as Spain reached the final four—their best performance in the competition until winning the 2010 FIFA World Cup 60 years later.

After leaving Athletic in 1955, he played for one year with SD Indautxu and another with Barakaldo CF before retiring. He died of a heart attack on 23 February 2006, aged 85. The Zarra Trophy for the highest-scoring Spaniard in La Liga is awarded in his memory.

== Early life ==
Zarra was born on 20 January 1921 at the Asúa train station in Erandio, Biscay. He was the son of Telmo Zarraonandía, an engineer and head of Asúa station, and Tomasa Montoya. Zarra was the seventh of ten children, five of them boys. The family was of Romani descent.

When he was young, Zarra used to play football with his neighbours. While other children had homemade or improvised balls, Zarra had access to a real ball, as two of his brothers played football in La Liga with Arenas de Getxo: Tomás, a goalkeeper and the oldest sibling, and Domingo, who died during the Spanish Civil War.

His father did not like Zarra playing football, because "it was enough with two brothers in the practice of this game." But Zarra liked the sport and began playing for several local teams, including Asia and Pitoberese. At that time, he was nicknamed "Telmito the fearful", as he would play cautiously, being ashamed and self-conscious of his skill.

== Career ==
=== Early career ===
Zarra signed his first professional contract with SD Erandio Club of the Second Division, and was incorporated into team during the 1937–38 season. Later he was recruited to a team from Biscay to play a friendly match against a team assembled from Guipuzcoa, during which Zarra scored seven goals in a 9–0 win.

Around this time, Athletic Bilbao was looking for players to rebuild the team, which had been disbanded years before in the chaos caused by the Civil War. The team began recruiting young, promising players from Erandio for their team for the 1940–41 season.

=== Professional stage and early successes ===
Zarra debuted with Athletic Club on 29 September 1940, in a league match against Valencia CF. The game ended in a 2–2 draw, with Zarraonandía scoring both goals for his team (including his first league goal, scored 17 minutes into the game).

During the 1941–42 season Zarra temporarily left Athletic Bilbao to join the army. He was dispatched to Ceuta, and played some friendly matches with the team there. Upon his return to Bilbao, Zarra experienced one of the biggest disappointments of his career while playing in the final of the Copa del Rey against Barcelona. They had reached the end of normal time and neither team had managed to score. During extra time, Zarra had an opportunity to score against rival goalkeeper Miró, but he missed the shot; consequently, Barça won the match and Cup.

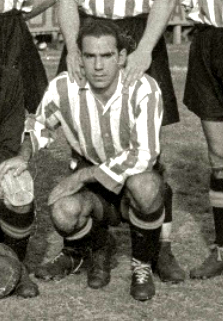
Zarra with Athletic Bilbao in 1944.

The 1942–43 campaign was one of the most important for both Zarra and Athletic Bilbao. Athletic reached the Copa del Rey final after having defeated Atlético Madrid and FC Valencia. There they met Real Madrid and this time, Zarra was able to redeem himself by scoring the only goal in the final, winning the year's cup in addition to the league title.

Zarra's first serious injury occurred in the 1943–44 season in a match against Barcelona. He broke his clavicle and was unable to play for a while. Once recovered, Zarra was able to return to the pitch and celebrate with a Copa del Rey title, helping Athletic record a 2–0 win over Valencia.

In the 1944–45 season, with Athletic again facing Valencia in the Copa del Rey final, four minutes from time a Valencia player fell to the ground. Zarra made a move to trample the fallen player, as a joke, and he was sent off by the referee. This expulsion was the first and only he suffered throughout his career. Despite this, Athletic took the title that year thanks to a goal by Rafael Iriondo that made the score 3–2.

Zarra experienced the best moments of his career in the 1944–45 season with his first Pichichi Trophy, marking 20 goals scored in 26 matches. He would go on to win this award on five other occasions (1946, 1947, 1950, 1951 and 1953).

=== 1945–1953 ===
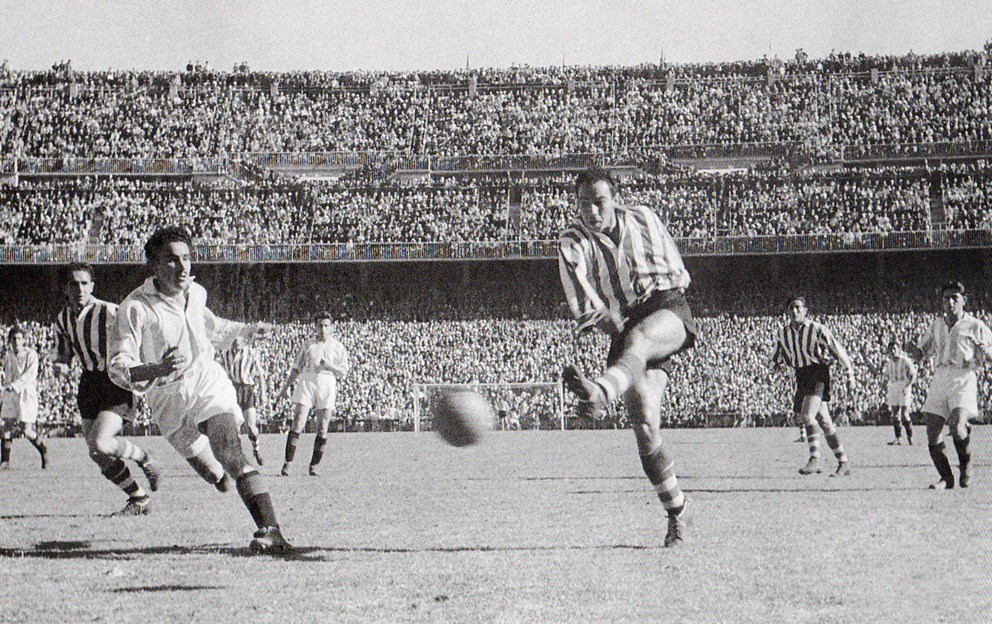
Zarra in action during the 1950 Copa del Generalísimo final against Real Valladolid.

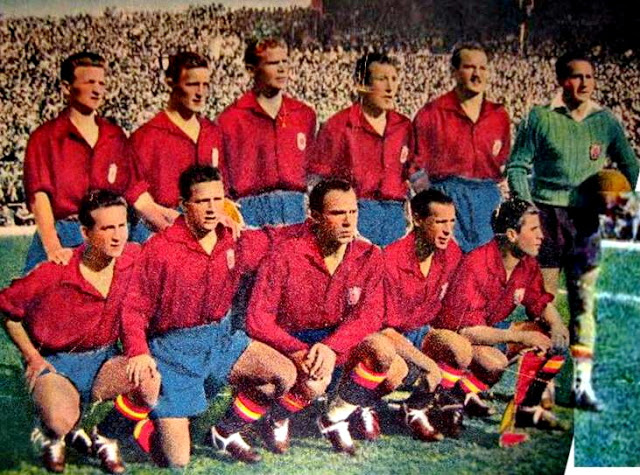
Zarra, pictured front row, center, with the Spain national team in 1950.

On 11 March 1945, Zarra was selected by the Spanish coach Jacinto Quincoces to join the Spanish national team for a friendly match against Portugal in Lisbon. On 6 May of that year he played against Portugal again, and scored two of the four goals that won the match.

On 28 May 1950, Zarra again played in another Copa del Rey final, this time against Real Valladolid after Valencia CF was disbanded. During the final, he scored four of the goals that won the game for his team. He opened the scoring at 14 minutes, but by end of regulation time the match was drawn. During extra time, Zarra scored a hat trick as Athletic won the cup. With those four against Valladolid, Zarra holds the record for highest number of goals scored in a Cup final.

Once qualified, the Spanish team played matches against the United States, Chile, and England in the 1950 FIFA World Cup. He scored one of the goals in a 2–0 win over Chile in the second match. Zarra referred to the third game, against England, as "the game of the century." Zarra's goal past the English goalkeeper Bert Williams won the match and sent Spain through at the expense of England. This goal, perhaps the most famous scored by Zarra, gave the victory to the Spanish team in their first World Cup semi-finals.

In the 1950–51 season Zarra was able to score 38 goals in 30 league games, a Spanish record that stood until the 2010–11 season. This record was also achieved by the Mexican Hugo Sánchez, although he scored his 38 goals over the course of 38 matches.

During the 1951–52 season Zarra suffered his most serious injury of his career, on 25 November 1951 in a game against Atlético Madrid, when the opposing goalkeeper fell on Zarra's leg. An operation was required for full recovery, which kept him out for the rest of the season. On his return in the 1952–53 season, he played 29 games and scored on 25 occasions, giving a scoring average of 0.86 from both seasons.

=== Last years and retirement ===
On 29 April 1954, Zarra received a tribute and benefit match in Madrid (played between two regional selections) in recognition of his long career in Spanish football. This event was attended by several VIPs from the world of football, including Alfredo Di Stéfano, Antonio Puchades, Estanislao Basora, Piru Gaínza, Eduardo Manchon, and Cesar Lesmes.

Zarra was nearing the end of this career and watched as young, promising Athletic players took over his role on the team, including a young player named Eneko Arieta, who would become his successor.

Zarra ended his Athletic career at the end of the 1954–55 season. From then on he devoted himself to playing for several teams in the Second Division until his official retirement from the game in 1957; however, he continued playing football with the veteran players of Biscay, donating the money collected from these games to charities.

== Career statistics ==
=== Club ===
Appearances and goals by club, season and competition
Club	Season	League			Cup		Total	
Club	Season	Division	Apps	Goals	Apps	Goals	Apps	Goals
Erandio	1939–40	Segunda División	20	12	0	0	20	12
Athletic Bilbao	1940–41	Primera División	8	5	0	0	8	5
Athletic Bilbao	1941–42	Primera División	21	17	8	11	29	28
Athletic Bilbao	1942–43	Primera División	17	16	8	8	25	24
Athletic Bilbao	1943–44	Primera División	21	12	10	10	31	22
Athletic Bilbao	1944–45	Primera División	26	20	9	14	35	34
Athletic Bilbao	1945–46	Primera División	18	24	2	0	20	24
Athletic Bilbao	1946–47	Primera División	24	33	6	3	30	36
Athletic Bilbao	1947–48	Primera División	16	9	0	0	16	9
Athletic Bilbao	1948–49	Primera División	26	22	10	9	36	31
Athletic Bilbao	1949–50	Primera División	26	24	7	13	33	37
Athletic Bilbao	1950–51	Primera División	30	38	6	8	38	49
Athletic Bilbao	1951–52	Primera División	5	3	0	0	5	3
Athletic Bilbao	1952–53	Primera División	29	24	7	5	36	29
Athletic Bilbao	1953–54	Primera División	5	2	1	0	6	2
Athletic Bilbao	1954–55	Primera División	6	2	0	0	6	2
Athletic Bilbao	Total		278	251	74	81	354	335
Indautxu	1955–56	Segunda División	27	17	0	0	27	17
Barakaldo	1956–57	Segunda División	12	2	0	0	12	2
Career total			337	282	74	81	411	363

=== International ===
Scores and results list Spain's goal tally first, score column indicates score after each Zarra goal.

List of international goals scored by Telmo Zarra
No.	Date	Venue	Opponent	Score	Result	Competition
1	6 May 1945	Riazor, Spain	Portugal	1–1	4–2	Friendly
2	6 May 1945	Riazor, Spain	Portugal	2–1	4–2	Friendly
3	2 March 1947	Dalymount Park, Dublin	Republic of Ireland	1–2	2–3	Friendly
4	2 March 1947	Dalymount Park, Dublin	Republic of Ireland	2–2	2–3	Friendly
5	20 March 1949	Unknown, Jamor, Oeiras, Portugal	Portugal	1–0	1–1	Friendly
6	12 June 1949	Dalymount Park, Dublin	Republic of Ireland	1–1	4–1	Friendly
7	12 June 1949	Dalymount Park, Dublin	Republic of Ireland	3–1	4–1	Friendly
8	2 April 1950	Nuevo Estadio Chamartín, Madrid, Spain	Portugal	1–0	5–1	1950 FIFA World Cup qualification
9	2 April 1950	Nuevo Estadio Chamartín, Madrid, Spain	Portugal	3–1	5–1	1950 FIFA World Cup qualification
10	9 April 1950	Unknown, Jamor, Oeiras, Portugal	Portugal	1–0	2–2	1950 FIFA World Cup qualification
11	25 June 1950	Estádio Vila Capanema, Curitiba, Brazil	United States	3–1	3–1	1950 FIFA World Cup group stage
12	29 June 1950	Estádio do Maracanã, Rio de Janeiro, Brazil	Chile	2–0	2–0	1950 FIFA World Cup group stage
13	2 July 1950	Estádio do Maracanã, Rio de Janeiro, Brazil	England	1–0	1–0	1950 FIFA World Cup group stage
14	16 July 1950	Pacaembu, São Paulo, Brazil	Sweden	1–3	1–3	1950 FIFA World Cup final stage
15	18 February 1951	Nuevo Estadio Chamartín, Madrid, Spain	Switzerland	1–0	6–3	Friendly
16	18 February 1951	Nuevo Estadio Chamartín, Madrid, Spain	Switzerland	2–0	6–3	Friendly
17	18 February 1951	Nuevo Estadio Chamartín, Madrid, Spain	Switzerland	4–2	6–3	Friendly
18	18 February 1951	Nuevo Estadio Chamartín, Madrid, Spain	Switzerland	5–2	6–3	Friendly
19	10 June 1951	Heysel Stadium, Brussels, Belgium	Belgium	2–3	3–3	Friendly
20	10 June 1951	Heysel Stadium, Brussels, Belgium	Belgium	3–3	3–3	Friendly

== Honours ==
Athletic Bilbao

- La Liga: 1942–43
- Copa del Rey: 1943, 1944, 1944–45, 1949–50, 1955
- Copa Eva Duarte: 1950

Individual

- Pichichi Trophy: 1944–45, 1945–46, 1946–47, 1949–50, 1950–51, 1952–53
- Golden Pichichi Trophy: 2003

Decorations

- Royal Order of Sports Merit
- Shiny gold badge of Málaga CF
- Silver botafumeiro of Deportivo de La Coruña

Posthumous dedications

- Zarra Trophy
- Memorial bust at Lezama training centre

Records

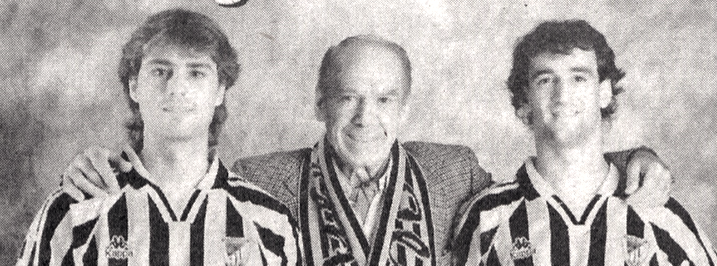
From left to right: Julen Guerrero, Zarra and Joseba Etxeberria in 1995.

- Spanish top scorer in the history of La Liga (251)
- Spanish player with the most goals in a single La Liga season (38)
- Spanish player with the most top scorer awards in La Liga history (6)
- Spanish player with the most hat tricks in La Liga history (23)
- Top scorer in the history of Copa del Rey (81 goals)
- Top scorer in the history of Athletic Bilbao (335 goals)
- Most goals in a Copa del Rey Final (4 – 1950)
- Top scorer in El Viejo Clásico vs Real Madrid (22)
- Top scorer in the Basque derby vs Real Sociedad (14)
