= 1944–45 La Liga =

14th season of La Liga

Primera División
- Season: 1944–45
- Champions: Barcelona (2nd title)
- Relegated: Granada; Sabadell; Deportivo La Coruña
- Matches: 182
- Goals: 656 (3.6 per match)
- Top goalscorer: Telmo Zarra (20 goals)
- Biggest home win: Castellón 8–0 Sabadell; Real Madrid 8–0 Sabadell
- Biggest away win: Sabadell 0–6 Español
- Highest scoring: Valencia 9–3 Murcia
- Longest winning run: 6 matches Atlético Bilbao; Barcelona
- Longest unbeaten run: 11 matches Barcelona
- Longest winless run: 12 matches Sabadell
- Longest losing run: 5 matches Sabadell

The 1944–45 La Liga was the 14th season since its establishment. Barcelona conquered their second title, 15 years after the first one in the inaugural season.

== Team locations ==
Location of teams in 1944–45 La Liga

Club	City	Stadium
Atlético Aviación	Madrid	Metropolitano
Atlético Bilbao	Bilbao	San Mamés
Barcelona	Barcelona	Les Corts
Castellón	Castellón de la Plana	El Sequiol
Deportivo La Coruña	A Coruña	Riazor
Español	Barcelona	Sarriá
Granada	Granada	Los Cármenes
Murcia	Murcia	La Condomina
Oviedo	Oviedo	Buenavista
Real Gijón	Gijón	El Molinón
Real Madrid	Madrid	Chamartín
Sabadell	Sabadell	Cruz Alta
Sevilla	Seville	Nervión
Valencia	Valencia	Mestalla

Real Gijón made their debut in La Liga.

== League table ==
Pos	Team	Pld	W	D	L	GF	GA	GD	Pts	Qualification or relegation
1	Barcelona (C)	26	17	5	4	50	30	+20	39	
2	Real Madrid	26	18	2	6	68	35	+33	38	
3	Atlético Aviación	26	13	5	8	46	41	+5	31 (Note: Atlético Aviación finished ahead of Oviedo on overall goal difference.)	
4	Oviedo	26	13	5	8	50	48	+2	31	
5	Valencia	26	12	6	8	61	35	+26	30 (Note: Valencia finished ahead of Atlético Bilbao on head-to-head points: Valencia–Atlético Bilbao 3–0, Atlético Bilbao–Valencia 1–1.)	
6	Atlético Bilbao	26	14	2	10	54	41	+13	30	
7	Real Gijón	26	9	6	11	42	46	−4	24 (Note: Real Gijón finished ahead of Castellón on head-to-head goal difference: Real Gijón–Castellón 4–0, Castellón–Real Gijón 3–0.)	
8	Castellón	26	10	4	12	43	50	−7	24	
9	Español	26	10	3	13	44	39	+5	23	
10	Sevilla	26	9	4	13	52	49	+3	22	
11	Murcia	26	7	5	14	40	58	−18	19 (Note: Murcia finished ahead of Granada on head-to-head points: Murcia–Granada 2–0, Granada–Murcia 1–1.)	
12	Granada (R)	26	7	5	14	40	55	−15	19	Qualification for the relegation play-offs
13	Sabadell (R)	26	6	5	15	30	67	−37	17 (Note: Sabadell finished ahead of Deportivo La Coruña on head-to-head points: Sabadell–Deportivo La Coruña 2–1, Deportivo La Coruña–Sabadell 1–2.)	Relegated to the Segunda División
14	Deportivo La Coruña (R)	26	5	7	14	36	62	−26	17	Relegated to the Segunda División

Source: BDFútbol
Rules for classification: 1) points; 2) head-to-head points; 3) head-to-head goal difference; 4) goal difference; 5) number of goals scored.
(C) Champions; (R) Relegated

== Results ==
Home \ Away	AAV	ATB	BAR	CAS	DEP	ESP	GRA	MUR	OVI	RGI	RMA	SAB	SEV	VAL
Atlético Aviación	—	1–0	1–1	4–0	1–1	3–1	1–1	4–3	4–3	2–0	0–1	2–1	3–1	4–1
Atlético Bilbao	0–1	—	4–1	1–3	5–2	3–0	4–1	5–1	0–1	0–1	2–1	4–1	4–0	2–2
Barcelona	2–2	5–2	—	3–1	3–0	1–0	4–2	1–0	0–1	2–0	5–0	2–1	3–1	1–0
Castellón	2–3	1–0	0–1	—	4–0	2–0	2–0	2–1	5–3	3–0	0–3	8–0	2–2	0–0
Deportivo La Coruña	4–1	1–2	1–2	1–1	—	3–2	1–1	3–1	4–1	2–2	2–2	1–2	1–0	2–3
Español	0–3	2–3	1–1	5–1	7–1	—	7–2	1–0	3–0	0–0	2–0	1–3	2–1	0–2
Granada	2–1	2–3	1–2	0–2	3–0	2–0	—	1–1	5–1	0–0	0–1	5–0	3–1	2–1
Murcia	0–0	2–2	1–1	2–0	1–0	1–2	2–0	—	5–1	2–2	3–5	2–0	3–1	2–1
Oviedo	3–2	2–0	6–0	2–0	2–2	1–0	1–1	3–2	—	2–1	4–0	6–2	2–0	2–0
Real Gijón	2–2	0–2	2–5	4–0	3–3	0–1	3–1	4–1	6–0	—	0–1	1–0	3–1	4–2
Real Madrid	3–1	4–1	1–0	2–1	6–0	3–0	6–2	2–1	4–1	4–1	—	8–0	5–0	1–1
Sabadell	0–1	1–2	0–1	1–1	2–1	0–6	3–2	4–0	0–0	2–2	3–2	—	2–3	1–1
Sevilla	4–1	2–3	0–0	8–1	3–0	1–1	4–1	4–0	1–1	6–0	1–2	4–0	—	3–2
Valencia	5–0	3–0	2–3	4–1	2–0	2–0	4–0	9–3	1–1	4–1	4–1	1–1	4–0	—

Source: BDFútbol
Legend: Blue = home team win; Yellow = draw; Red = away team win.

== Relegation play-offs ==
Since this season, there was only match of the relegation play-offs. It was played at Estadio Metropolitano de Madrid.

Team 1	Score	Team 2
Granada	1–4	Celta Vigo

== Top scorers ==
Rank	Player	Team	Goals
1	(Spain) Telmo Zarra	Atlético Bilbao	20
2	(Spain) Sabino Barinaga	Real Madrid	17
2	(Spain) Mundo	Valencia	17
4	(Spain) Guillermo Gorostiza	Valencia	16
4	(Spain) José Escolà	Barcelona	16
6	(Spain) César Rodríguez	Barcelona	15
7	(Spain) Emilín	Oviedo	14
8	(Spain) Vicente Morera	Murcia	13
8	(Spain) Juan Arza	Sevilla	13
10	Five players		12
