= Epi Fernández =

Spanish footballer (1919–1977)

Personal information
- Full name: Epifanio Fernández Berridi
- Date of birth: 23 April 1919
- Place of birth: San Sebastián, Spain
- Date of death: 17 June 1977 (aged 58)
- Position: Forward

Senior career*
Years	Team	Apps	(Gls)
1940–1949	Valencia	198	(78)
1949–1955	Real Sociedad	136	(54)

International career
1941–1949	Spain	15	(4)
- * Club domestic league appearances and goals

Epi Fernández Berridi (23 April 1919 – 12 June 1977) is a Spanish former footballer who played as forward for the Spanish club Valencia of La Liga.
