= Edmundo Suárez =

Spanish footballer & manager (1916–1978)

Mundo
Personal information
- Full name: Edmundo Suárez Trabanco
- Date of birth: 22 January 1916
- Place of birth: Barakaldo, Spain
- Date of death: 14 December 1978 (aged 62)
- Place of death: Valencia, Spain
- Position: Forward

Youth career
- Kakaleku
- Lejona (SD Leioa)

Senior career*
Years	Team	Apps	(Gls)
1935–1936	Athletic Bilbao	1	(0)
- Logroñés
1939–1950	Valencia	210	(186)
1950–1951	Alcoyano	21	(9)

International career
1941–1942	Spain	3	(3)

Managerial career
- 1951–1952: Hércules
- Gandía
- 1954–1956: Zaragoza
- 1956–1957: Lleida
- 1957–1958: Cultural Leonesa
- 1958–1959: Real Gijón
- 1959–1960: Zaragoza
- 1960: Xerez
- 1960–1961: Baracaldo
- 1962–1964: Mestalla
- 1964–1965: Valencia
- 1965–1966: Mestalla
- 1966–1968: Valencia
- 1970: Murcia
- 1971: Levante
- Mestalla
- * Club domestic league appearances and goals

Edmundo Suárez Trabanco (22 January 1916 – 14 December 1978) was a Spanish football player and coach – better known as Mundo. He was born in Barakaldo. He played as a forward for Spanish club Valencia CF for most of his career, except for his last season, where he played for CD Alcoyano. As of 2009, he was one of the Top 10 all-time goal scorers in the Spanish La Liga, with 195 goals during 231 appearances.

== Club career ==
Mundo initially played football with various amateur teams in his native Basque Country, but the Spanish Civil War changed his career completely. He had a contract with Athletic Bilbao but this acquisition was made in republican territory, therefore it was not considered valid by the pro-Franco state which remained in power after the War. In 1939, the pro-Franco army created a team, named "Recovery of Levante" formed diverse players who had fought in the military region of Levante. Said team was chosen by Valencia CF as its first opponent after the war, and after seeing 'Recovery of Levante' in action, the established club did not waste the opportunity and acquired all of its players.

After this acquisition, Mundo stayed in Valencia for eleven seasons between 1939–40 and 1949–50. His great physical strength allowed him to dominate Spanish football during the 1940s. Along with Epifanio Fernández, Amadeo Ibáñez, Vicente Asensi and Guillermo Gorostiza, he formed an electric front line that transformed Valencia into a winning team: they won La Liga three times during that decade (1941–42, 1943–44, 1946–47) and were runners-up twice, and claimed the Copa del Rey on two occasions (1941, 1948–49) from five appearances in the final.

Mundo is considered an idol for fans of Valencia because he holds, by a considerable margin, the record for the highest number of goals scored for the club with 238 in the two major domestic competitions, obtaining an average of 0.92 goals per game. He won the Pichichi Trophy (top scoring player) in the 1941–42 and 1942–43 seasons, with 27 and 28 goals respectively. He is currently the tenth highest goal scorer in the history of the Spanish league (with the fifth-highest goals-per-game ratio), and the sixth highest goalscorer in the history of the Copa del Rey.

After a season in which he played only six games, he decided to leave Valencia to join in the nearby, smaller club Alcoyano which was also in the first division. He remained there for the 1950–51 season, until he realised he was no longer able to play at the top level.

== International career ==
Suárez earned three international caps with the Spain national team between 1941 and 1942, scoring three goals. His international debut was on 28 December 1941 against Switzerland.

== Coaching career ==
During the 1963–64 season, Suárez returned to Valencia and took up the position of team coach, replacing Pasieguito, another legend of Valencian football. Thanks to his strong character and tactical flexibility, he went on to improve Valencia's league position, placing them in sixth place. The team's performance in the Fairs Cup was much better, but they lost against Real Zaragoza in a controversial match. After the positive results of that year, the Valencia FC board of directors allowed him to coach for one more year. However, as the team finished the league in fourth place, the directors hired another coach, Barinaga. With Barinaga, the team did not reach its expectations, so Mundo returned to his old position as coach for the next season.

He started the 1966–67 season as the team's coach and achieved great success, winning the Copa del Rey by beating Athletic Club 2–0 in the final. He remained Valencia's coach until 13 October 1968, when he ended his coaching career due to the team's poor performance.

== Career statistics ==
Appearances and goals by club, season and competition
Club	Season	League		
Club	Season	Division	Apps	Goals
Valencia	1939–40	La Liga	20	14
Valencia	1940–41	La Liga	22	21
Valencia	1941–42	La Liga	25	27
Valencia	1942–43	La Liga	22	23
Valencia	1943–44	La Liga	26	28
Valencia	1944–45	La Liga	21	17
Valencia	1945–46	La Liga	25	20
Valencia	1946–47	La Liga	10	10
Valencia	1947–48	La Liga	11	5
Valencia	1948–49	La Liga	22	19
Valencia	1949–50	La Liga	6	2
Valencia	Total		210	186
Alcoyano	1950–51	La Liga	21	9
Total			231	195

== Honours ==
=== Player ===
Valencia

- La Liga: 1941–42, 1943–44, 1946–47
- Copa del Rey: 1941, 1949
- Copa Eva Duarte: 1949

Individual

- Pichichi Trophy: 1941–42, 1943–44

=== Manager ===
Valencia

- Copa del Rey: 1967
