= Vicente Asensi =

Spanish footballer

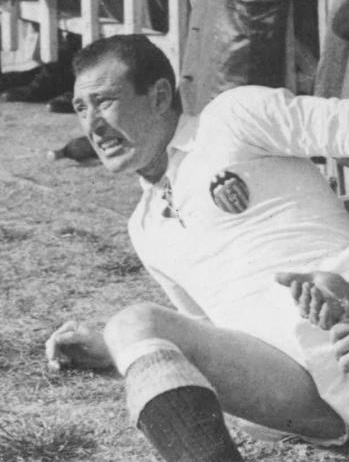

Personal information
- Full name: Vicente Asensi Albentosa
- Date of birth: 28 January 1919
- Place of birth: L'Alcúdia de Crespins, Spain
- Date of death: 2 September 2000 (aged 81)
- Place of death: Valencia, Spain
- Positions: Left winger; defender

Youth career
- Canalense

Senior career*
Years	Team	Apps	(Gls)
1939–1940	Burjassot		
1940–1954	Valencia	275	(33)
1954–1955	Mestalla	18	(0)

International career
1945–1950	Spain	6	(0)

Managerial career
- 1958–1959: Onda
- 1962: Castellón
- * Club domestic league appearances and goals

Vicente Asensi Albentosa (28 January 1919 – 2 September 2000) was a football player who spent all his career at Valencia CF where he played 308 games and scored 33 goals. Together with Epi, Amadeo, Mundo and Gorostiza they made up one of the best attacks in the 1940s. He played as left winger during most of his career but was moved further back as he grew older and ended up playing as a defender. At international level, he also gained six caps with the Spain national football team between 1945 and 1950.
