= 1941–42 La Liga =

11th season of La Liga

Primera División
- Season: 1941–42
- Champions: Valencia (1st title)
- Relegated: Hércules; Real Sociedad
- Matches: 182
- Goals: 741 (4.07 per match)
- Top goalscorer: Mundo (27 goals)
- Biggest home win: Atlético Bilbao 10–0 Celta; Sevilla 10–0 Oviedo

The 1941–42 La Liga was the 11th season of Spanish football league. Valencia won the first top-flight title in club history.

== Team locations ==
Location of teams in La 1941–42 La Liga

Real Sociedad returned to the first division after a three-season absence. Granada, Deportivo La Coruña and Castellón made their debut in La Liga.

For this season, Hércules played with the denomination of Alicante CF. The namesake club acted as its reserve team with the name of Lucentum CF.

Club	City	Stadium
Alicante	Alicante	Bardín
Atlético Aviación	Madrid	Chamartín
Atlético Bilbao	Bilbao	San Mamés
Barcelona	Barcelona	Les Corts
Castellón	Castellón de la Plana	El Sequiol
Celta	Vigo	Balaídos
Deportivo La Coruña	A Coruña	Riazor
Español	Barcelona	Sarriá
Granada	Granada	Los Cármenes
Oviedo	Oviedo	Buenavista
Real Madrid	Madrid	Chamartín
Real Sociedad	San Sebastián	Atocha
Sevilla	Seville	Nervión
Valencia	Valencia	Mestalla

== League table ==
Pos	Team	Pld	W	D	L	GF	GA	GD	Pts	Qualification or relegation
1	Valencia (C)	26	18	4	4	85	39	+46	40	
2	Real Madrid	26	14	5	7	65	43	+22	33 (Note: Real Madrid finished ahead of Atlético Aviación on head-to-head goal difference: Real Madrid–Atlético Aviación 4–1, Atlético Aviación–Real Madrid 2–0.)	
3	Atlético Aviación	26	14	5	7	50	44	+6	33	
4	Deportivo La Coruña	26	12	4	10	36	37	−1	28 (Note: Deportivo La Coruña finished ahead of Celta on head-to-head goal difference: Deportivo–Celta 4–0, Celta–Deportivo 2–1.)	
5	Celta	26	11	6	9	53	58	−5	28	
6	Sevilla	26	10	7	9	58	45	+13	27 (Note: Sevilla finished ahead of Atlético Bilbao on head-to-head points: Sevilla–Atlético Bilbao 2–1, Atlético Bilbao–Sevilla 1–1.)	
7	Atlético Bilbao	26	10	7	9	55	41	+14	27	
8	Castellón	26	10	6	10	54	63	−9	26 (Note: Castellón finished ahead of Español on head-to-head points: Castellón–Español 2–0, Español–Castellón 2–3.)	
9	Español	26	10	6	10	49	42	+7	26	
10	Granada	26	10	5	11	64	52	+12	25	
11	Oviedo (O)	26	8	7	11	42	63	−21	23	Qualification for the relegation play-offs
12	Barcelona (O)	26	8	3	15	57	66	−9	19	Qualification for the relegation play-offs
13	Hércules (R)	26	6	5	15	42	71	−29	17	Relegated to the Segunda División
14	Real Sociedad (R)	26	5	2	19	31	77	−46	12	Relegated to the Segunda División

Source: BDFútbol
Rules for classification: 1) points; 2) head-to-head points; 3) head-to-head goal difference; 4) goal difference; 5) number of goals scored.
(C) Champions; (O) Play-off winners; (R) Relegated

== Results ==
Home \ Away	ALI	AAV	ATB	BAR	CAS	CEL	DEP	ESP	GRA	RMA	OVI	RSO	SEV	VAL
Alicante	—	2–2	3–1	3–1	0–1	1–3	4–2	1–1	2–2	1–2	4–1	3–1	1–0	1–3
Atlético Aviación	5–1	—	2–2	5–4	4–4	2–0	0–0	2–0	3–0	2–0	0–2	4–1	0–0	3–0
Atlético Bilbao	2–2	6–0	—	6–3	2–2	10–0	0–0	2–4	1–0	1–0	2–0	4–1	1–1	2–3
Barcelona	4–4	5–1	1–2	—	3–1	0–2	2–1	1–2	4–0	0–2	6–3	4–2	6–2	2–4
Castellón	4–0	2–4	4–0	1–1	—	0–3	1–0	2–0	3–2	0–3	4–0	5–0	1–1	2–2
Celta	4–1	0–2	3–0	1–0	1–2	—	2–1	4–3	3–3	2–4	2–1	6–1	1–1	3–3
Deportivo La Coruña	3–1	2–1	2–1	1–0	2–1	4–0	—	2–0	1–4	1–0	1–0	3–0	2–1	0–3
Español	2–0	5–0	1–1	5–2	2–3	3–1	1–2	—	1–1	0–0	1–1	8–0	3–1	0–1
Granada	7–2	0–1	1–3	6–0	7–3	1–1	4–1	4–0	—	3–1	8–0	3–1	3–2	1–2
Real Madrid	2–1	4–1	3–2	4–3	9–1	2–3	3–0	1–1	5–2	—	1–1	6–4	0–2	5–3
Oviedo	2–0	2–3	2–1	1–1	4–4	2–1	1–1	1–3	3–1	2–2	—	3–1	4–0	1–1
Real Sociedad	2–1	1–2	0–1	2–0	3–0	2–2	3–2	1–2	1–1	2–3	0–3	—	2–1	0–3
Sevilla	7–2	1–0	2–1	1–2	4–1	2–2	2–2	6–0	3–0	2–2	10–0	1–0	—	4–1
Valencia	7–1	0–1	1–1	4–2	6–2	7–3	2–0	2–1	5–0	3–1	5–2	6–0	8–1	—

Source: BDFútbol
Legend: Blue = home team win; Yellow = draw; Red = away team win.

== Relegation play-offs ==
Both matches were played at Estadio Chamartín in Chamartín de la Rosa.

Team 1	Score	Team 2
Oviedo	3–1	Sabadell
Barcelona	5–1	Murcia

== Top scorers ==
Rank	Player	Team	Goals
1	(Spain) Mundo	Valencia	27
2	(Spain) César	Granada	23
2	(Spain) Manuel Alday	Real Madrid	23
4	(Spain) Juan del Pino	Celta	22
5	(Spain) Paco Campos	Atlético Aviación	20
5	(Spain) Guillermo Gorostiza	Valencia	20
7	(Spain) Basilio	Castellón	19
8	(Spain) Mariano Martín	Barcelona	18
9	(Spain) Campanal I	Sevilla	17
10	(Spain) Zarra	Atlético Bilbao	15
10	(Spain) Vicente Asensi	Valencia	15
