= 1943–44 La Liga =

13th season of La Liga

Primera División
- Season: 1943–44
- Champions: Valencia (2nd title)
- Relegated: Real Sociedad; Celta
- Matches: 182
- Goals: 694 (3.81 per match)
- Top goalscorer: Mundo (28 goals)
- Biggest home win: Valencia 8–0 Sevilla
- Biggest away win: Celta 0–5 Oviedo
- Highest scoring: Oviedo 9–2 Sabadell
- Longest winning run: 7 matches Atlético Bilbao
- Longest unbeaten run: 10 matches Valencia
- Longest winless run: 13 matches Celta
- Longest losing run: 5 matches Celta

The 1943–44 La Liga was the 13th season since its establishment. Valencia achieved its second title.

== Team locations ==
Location of teams in 1943–44 La Liga

Club	City	Stadium
Atlético Aviación	Madrid	Metropolitano
Atlético Bilbao	Bilbao	San Mamés
Barcelona	Barcelona	Les Corts
Castellón	Castellón de la Plana	El Sequiol
Celta	Vigo	Balaídos
Deportivo La Coruña	A Coruña	Riazor
Español	Barcelona	Sarriá
Granada	Granada	Los Cármenes
Oviedo	Oviedo	Buenavista
Real Madrid	Madrid	Chamartín
Real Sociedad	San Sebastián	Atocha
Sabadell	Sabadell	Cruz Alta
Sevilla	Seville	Nervión
Valencia	Valencia	Mestalla

== League table ==
Pos	Team	Pld	W	D	L	GF	GA	GD	Pts	Qualification or relegation
1	Valencia (C)	26	18	4	4	73	32	+41	40	
2	Atlético Aviación	26	15	4	7	66	49	+17	34	
3	Sevilla	26	12	8	6	60	46	+14	32	
4	Oviedo	26	12	5	9	71	47	+24	29 (Note: Oviedo finished ahead of Castellón on head-to-head goal difference: Castellón–Oviedo 2–0, Oviedo–Castellón 3–0.)	
5	Castellón	26	13	3	10	42	36	+6	29	
6	Barcelona	26	10	8	8	59	46	+13	28 (Note: Barcelona finished ahead of Real Madrid on overall goal difference.)	
7	Real Madrid	26	11	6	9	48	38	+10	28	
8	Granada	26	9	8	9	41	46	−5	26	
9	Sabadell	26	11	3	12	53	60	−7	25 (Note: Sabadell finished ahead of Atlético Bilbao on head-to-head goal difference: Sabadell–Atlético Bilbao 5–1, Atlético Bilbao–Sabadell 4–3.)	
10	Atlético Bilbao	26	10	5	11	47	51	−4	25	
11	Español (O)	26	9	5	12	42	50	−8	23	Qualification for the relegation play-offs
12	Deportivo La Coruña (O)	26	6	7	13	35	64	−29	19	Qualification for the relegation play-offs
13	Real Sociedad (R)	26	5	7	14	34	54	−20	17	Relegated to the Segunda División
14	Celta (R)	26	2	5	19	23	75	−52	9	Relegated to the Segunda División

Source: BDFútbol
Rules for classification: 1) points; 2) head-to-head points; 3) head-to-head goal difference; 4) goal difference; 5) number of goals scored.
(C) Champions; (O) Play-off winners; (R) Relegated

== Results ==
Home \ Away	AAV	ATB	BAR	CAS	CEL	DEP	ESP	GRA	RMA	OVI	RSO	SAB	SEV	VAL
Atlético Aviación	—	2–1	2–1	2–0	7–0	4–2	3–1	0–0	3–1	1–2	6–2	4–3	2–2	4–2
Atlético Bilbao	0–0	—	2–1	2–3	5–1	3–1	1–1	2–2	1–2	2–1	3–0	4–3	0–1	2–1
Barcelona	4–5	3–3	—	1–0	3–0	3–3	1–3	7–2	1–2	3–1	2–0	5–0	1–1	1–1
Castellón	3–2	5–0	3–0	—	2–0	2–1	2–1	0–2	2–1	2–0	3–0	4–0	1–2	1–1
Celta	1–2	3–2	2–2	2–2	—	0–0	0–1	0–1	1–0	0–5	0–2	0–3	1–5	1–2
Deportivo La Coruña	2–4	1–0	1–4	3–2	3–2	—	3–1	2–2	2–2	1–0	0–0	0–4	0–3	0–2
Español	1–2	4–0	1–3	0–1	1–1	7–0	—	2–0	1–1	2–0	2–2	5–1	3–2	0–3
Granada	2–3	0–0	2–0	1–1	5–2	2–2	4–0	—	2–2	5–2	1–0	2–1	2–1	1–3
Real Madrid	3–2	1–3	0–1	3–0	3–0	3–0	3–1	2–2	—	2–1	4–1	4–1	3–5	1–1
Oviedo	4–1	1–2	3–3	3–0	5–1	4–2	6–1	2–0	2–0	—	3–3	9–2	5–1	2–1
Real Sociedad	2–0	1–4	1–1	2–3	1–1	2–3	6–1	3–0	2–1	2–2	—	0–1	0–0	2–4
Sabadell	4–1	5–1	3–2	1–0	4–0	3–1	0–0	2–0	1–3	3–3	2–0	—	1–1	2–4
Sevilla	4–2	3–0	2–2	4–0	4–3	2–2	1–2	4–1	1–1	2–2	4–0	5–2	—	0–2
Valencia	2–2	5–4	3–4	2–0	5–1	3–0	4–0	3–0	1–0	5–3	3–0	2–1	8–0	—

Source: BDFútbol
Legend: Blue = home team win; Yellow = draw; Red = away team win.

== Relegation play-offs ==
Match between Deportivo La Coruña and Constancia was played at Estadio Chamartín in Chamartín de la Rosa, while the other one was held at Camp de Les Corts, Barcelona.

Team 1	Score	Team 2
Español	7–1	Alcoyano
Deportivo La Coruña	4–0	Constancia

== Top scorers ==
Rank	Player	Team	Goals
1	(Spain) Mundo	Valencia	28
2	(Spain) Esteban Echevarría	Oviedo	25
3	(Spain) Mariano Martín	Barcelona	24
4	(Spain) Juan del Pino	Celta	21
5	(Spain) Sabino Barinaga	Real Madrid	20
6	(Spain) Paco Campos	Atlético Aviación	17
6	(Spain) Juan Arza	Sevilla	17
8	(Spain) Guillermo Gorostiza	Valencia	16
9	(Spain) Basilio	Castellón	15
10	(Spain) Herrerita	Oviedo	14
