= 1946–47 La Liga =

16th season of La Liga

Primera División
- Season: 1946–47
- Champions: Valencia (3rd title)
- Relegated: Murcia; Deportivo La Coruña; Castellón
- Matches: 182
- Goals: 704 (3.87 per match)
- Top goalscorer: Telmo Zarra (33 goals)
- Biggest home win: Deportivo La Coruña 8–1 Castellón
- Biggest away win: Celta 0–4 Atlético Madrid
- Highest scoring: Real Madrid 7–4 Castellón; Atlético Madrid 8–3 Español
- Longest winning run: 7 matches Atlético Bilbao
- Longest unbeaten run: 12 matches Sabadell
- Longest winless run: 9 matches Deportivo La Coruña
- Longest losing run: 6 matches Castellón

The 1946–47 La Liga was the 16th season since its establishment. Valencia conquered their third title.

== Team locations ==
Location of teams in 1946–47 La Liga

Club	City	Stadium
Atlético Bilbao	Bilbao	San Mamés
Atlético Madrid	Madrid	Metropolitano
Barcelona	Barcelona	Les Corts
Castellón	Castellón de la Plana	Castalia
Celta	Vigo	Balaídos
Deportivo La Coruña	A Coruña	Riazor
Español	Barcelona	Sarriá
Murcia	Murcia	La Condomina
Oviedo	Oviedo	Buenavista
Real Gijón	Gijón	El Molinón
Real Madrid	Madrid	Metropolitano
Sabadell	Sabadell	Cruz Alta
Sevilla	Seville	Nervión
Valencia	Valencia	Mestalla

== League table ==
Pos	Team	Pld	W	D	L	GF	GA	GD	Pts	Qualification or relegation
1	Valencia (C)	26	16	2	8	54	34	+20	34 (Note: Valencia finished ahead of Atlético Bilbao on head-to-head points: Valencia–Atlético Bilbao 1–0, Atlético Bilbao–Valencia 0–1.)	
2	Atlético Bilbao	26	15	4	7	72	38	+34	34	
3	Atlético Madrid	26	13	6	7	58	44	+14	32	
4	Barcelona	26	14	3	9	59	42	+17	31	
5	Sabadell	26	11	8	7	42	36	+6	30	
6	Sevilla	26	12	5	9	54	48	+6	29	
7	Real Madrid	26	11	5	10	62	56	+6	27 (Note: Real Madrid finished ahead of Oviedo on head-to-head points: Real Madrid–Oviedo 2–0, Oviedo–Real Madrid 0–0.)	
8	Oviedo	26	10	7	9	52	42	+10	27	
9	Celta	26	11	4	11	53	48	+5	26	
10	Real Gijón	26	10	5	11	51	59	−8	25	
11	Español	26	9	1	16	46	59	−13	19 (Note: Español finished ahead of Murcia on overall goal difference.)	
12	Murcia (R)	26	6	7	13	30	58	−28	19	Qualification for the relegation play-offs
13	Deportivo La Coruña (R)	26	5	8	13	32	60	−28	18	Relegated to the Segunda División
14	Castellón (R)	26	4	5	17	39	80	−41	13	Relegated to the Segunda División

Source: BDFútbol
Rules for classification: 1) points; 2) head-to-head points; 3) head-to-head goal difference; 4) goal difference; 5) number of goals scored.
(C) Champions; (R) Relegated

== Results ==
Home \ Away	ATB	ATM	BAR	CAS	CEL	DEP	ESP	MUR	OVI	RGI	RMA	SAB	SEV	VAL
Atlético Bilbao	—	3–1	1–0	6–0	3–2	6–0	4–1	6–2	4–1	6–2	2–0	2–1	5–0	0–1
Atlético Madrid	4–0	—	2–2	3–2	3–2	3–1	8–3	2–2	5–2	2–2	2–3	1–3	1–1	1–1
Barcelona	2–1	3–2	—	3–3	1–1	5–0	5–0	6–2	2–0	4–1	3–2	0–1	5–1	2–1
Castellón	2–2	0–2	4–1	—	1–2	1–1	4–3	1–0	3–3	0–2	2–3	4–0	1–4	2–4
Celta	3–2	0–4	2–1	0–0	—	4–2	3–2	6–0	3–3	6–2	3–4	2–1	3–0	1–2
Deportivo La Coruña	3–3	1–0	3–2	8–1	1–4	—	1–0	3–1	2–2	1–1	2–2	1–1	0–0	0–0
Español	0–3	4–1	0–1	5–0	2–0	3–1	—	2–3	2–1	2–1	4–2	1–2	4–0	1–2
Murcia	2–4	1–2	0–1	2–0	0–2	1–0	1–2	—	0–0	5–4	1–1	0–0	1–1	1–0
Oviedo	3–0	4–0	2–3	4–1	2–0	3–1	4–0	3–0	—	3–2	0–0	0–1	4–2	4–1
Real Gijón	1–0	1–2	3–1	4–0	3–0	2–0	1–1	4–1	1–1	—	2–1	3–1	1–4	4–1
Real Madrid	3–6	1–2	2–1	7–4	3–3	5–0	2–0	5–0	2–0	4–0	—	1–3	3–0	2–4
Sabadell	1–1	1–1	1–4	4–1	2–0	3–0	3–1	1–1	1–1	2–2	3–3	—	3–1	3–0
Sevilla	2–2	1–2	3–1	4–2	2–0	4–0	3–1	1–1	2–1	5–2	5–0	4–0	—	3–1
Valencia	1–0	0–2	4–0	3–0	2–1	3–0	3–2	1–2	4–1	6–0	4–1	1–0	4–1	—

Source: BDFútbol
Legend: Blue = home team win; Yellow = draw; Red = away team win.

== Relegation play-offs ==
Match was played at Estadio Metropolitano de Madrid.

Team 1	Score	Team 2
Murcia	0–2	Real Sociedad

== Top scorers ==
Rank	Player	Team	Goals
1	(Spain) Telmo Zarra	Atlético Bilbao	33
2	(Spain) Pruden	Real Madrid	22
3	(Spain) Juan Araujo	Sevilla	21
4	(Spain) Ángel Calvo	Español	19
5	(Spain) Isidro Lángara	Oviedo	18
5	(Spain) Francisco Méndez	Real Gijón	18
7	(Spain) Pahiño	Celta	17
8	(Spain) José Luis Panizo	Atlético Bilbao	16
9	(Spain) Paco Campos	Atlético Madrid	14
9	(Spain) Antonio Vázquez	Sabadell	14
