= Francisco Almenar =

Spanish architect and sports leader

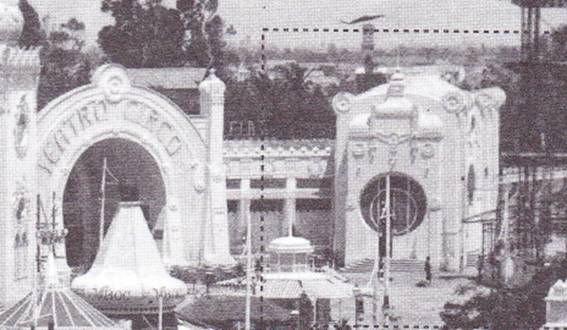
- General View of the Automobile Pavilion, next to the Circo Theater in 1909
- Born: Francisco Almenar Quinzá; 27 July 1876; Valencia, Spain
- Died: 7 March 1936 (aged 59); Valencia, Spain
- Citizenship: Spanish
- Occupations: Architect, Sports leader
- Known for: 11th President of Valencia CF

12th President of Valencia CF
- In office 7 August 1933 – 10 June 1934
- Preceded by: Adolfo Royo
- Succeeded by: Adolfo Royo

15th President of Valencia CF
- In office 3 November 1935 – 7 March 1936
- Preceded by: Luis Casanova Giner
- Succeeded by: Luis Casanova Giner

Francisco Almenar Quinzá (27 July 1876 – 7 March 1936) was a Spanish architect and sports leader who served as the 11th president of football club Valencia CF between 1933 and 1936.

== Early life and education ==
Francisco Almenar was born on 27 July 1876 in Valencia, as the son of Bernardo Almenar Llácer and Rosario Quinzá Birgón. He married one of the daughters of the architect Antonio Martorell Trilles.

Almenar completed his high school studies in Valencia, moving to Barcelona in 1893 where he studied architecture at the Barcelona School of Architecture, graduating on 27 April 1904.

== Architect career ==
Upon his return to Valencia, Almenar became an architect for the State, designing several important works in the city, such as the Pavilion for Agriculture and Industry and the Automobile Pavilion, the Circus Theater, and the Great Entrance Arch, all for the Valencia Regional Exhibition in 1909, after which they were all demolished.

Almenar also designed two performance halls that have not survived to this day, the Teatro Martí in 1915 located on the current Paseo de Ruzafa (formerly Pi y Margall) and the Gran Teatro (later Rex cinema) from 1923, located on Marqués de Sotelo Avenue no. 6 and which was demolished in 2003. Between January and May 1923, he oversaw the construction works of the Mestalla Stadium, the field where Valencia CF played. He directed the works of the Dominican Church on Cirilo Amorós Street in Valencia, executing the project of Joaquín María Arnau Miramón, who died before the church was built. He intervened with Javier Goerlich in the Banco de Valencia building and with José Cort Botí in the Casa de la Caridad.

His work is also the building he built on Játiva Street for the Hotel Metropol. He designed several garages in the city, and various residential buildings, such as the Casa Ernesto Ferrer, in the town hall square.

On 29 December 1906, Almenar was appointed academic of the Real Academia de Bellas Artes de San Carlos de Valencia.

== Presidency of Valencia CF ==
A lifelong football fan, the surname Almenar appears in some line-ups of Club Hispania Valencia during the 1912–13 season, but it is most likely a different person since Francisco was already 36 at the time. He was a member of Valencia almost since its foundation, Almenar held the second vice-presidency of the club during the mandate of Facundo Pascual Quilis, who entrusted him with the project for the construction of a new covered stand, as well as the new façade and entrances, which lasted for several months until its inauguration on 23 January 1927. He remained on the boards of directors of Manuel García del Moral and Adolfo Royo, and when the latter resigned following a minor incident with the sports press, Almenar was elected president of Valencia CF on 7 August 1933, a position that he held for just one year, until 10 June 1934, when he was replaced by Royo. His presidency was short-lived, but very successful, as the club achieved its greatest achievement thus far in a national official competition, by playing in the 1934 Copa del Presidente de la República final, which ended in a 2–1 loss to Real Madrid. Furthermore, it was also during his presidency that Valencia signed Carlos Iturraspe and Bertolí, two future club legends.

The following year, on 3 November 1935, Almenar was re-elected, but just four months later, he died from a heart attack, thus becoming the first and only president of Valencia to die in office.

== Death and legacy ==
Almenar died in Valencia on 7 March 1936, at the age of 59, from a heart attack. At the time of his death, he was dean of the College of Architects of Valencia and Knight of the Order of Charles III. His funeral was attended by the Valencia players, recently arrived from Pamplona, where they had played a league match.

An architect by profession, he has a street in the city labeled with his name: Arquitecto Almenar.
