= Facundo Pascual =

Spanish sports leader

7th President of Valencia CF
- In office 21 June 1925 – 1929
- Preceded by: Pablo Verdeguer Comes
- Succeeded by: Juan Giménez Cánovas

Personal details
- Born: Facundo Pascual Quilis

Facundo Pascual Quilis was a Spanish sports leader who served as the 7th president of football club Valencia CF between 1925 and 1929.

== Presidency of Valencia ==
=== First years ===
On 21 June 1925, Pascual Quilis was appointed as the 7th president of Valencia CF, replacing acting president Pablo Verdeguer Comes, being accompanied by Juan Fortis Olaso and Ramón Ferrer Aguilar as first and second vice presidents respectively. Three months later, on 18 September 1925, the club moved its headquarters to Moratín Street, numbers 6 and 8. The previous board continued to make decisions until the assembly held on 3 June 1926, when Pascual Quilis was ratified as president.

In his first season as president, Valencia was once again proclaimed regional champion, which allowed them to compete in the 1926 Copa del Rey, but they did not qualify for the final phase. Notably, the Mestalla Stadium hosted the Cup final for the first time in its history, contested by FC Barcelona and Atlético Madrid, ending in a 3–2 victory to the former.

=== New stadium and Colina Álvarez ===
In the second year of his mandate, the Mestalla Stadium saw its first remodeling just three years after being inaugurated. Planted grass was installed and a covered grandstand was constructed. The project was led by architect Francisco Almenar, who had led the construction works of Mestalla, and who held the second vice presidency of the club. The works began at the beginning of the season and lasted for several months. The Mestalla stand, as well as the new façade and entrances, was officially inaugurated on 23 January 1927 during a Regional Championship match that pitted Valencia against CD Castellón. The celebrations were led by Pascual Quilis, the representative of the Spanish Football Federation, Luis Colina Álvarez, and the president of the Valencian Regional Federation, José Posada Solis. With the transformation, Mestalla reached a capacity of 17,000 spectators, with the initial cost of the works being 211,981.70 pesetas.

On 6 April 1927, the club moved its social premises again, leaving Moratín Street to move to Las Barcas Street, number 5, the main street. In the 1926–27 season, the team reached the semifinals of the Cup, after having eliminated Real Madrid in the quarterfinals, but was defeated by Real Sociedad. On 10 February 1928, at the proposal of manager Remigio Sáez Soler, Facundo Pascual incorporated Colina Álvarez into the Valencia FC team as technical secretary, a position in which he remained for 28 years, until shortly before his death. His experience was fundamental in the team's development, being present in the great historical events of the entity, such as promotion to the First Division in 1932 and runner-up in the Copa del Rey in 1934.

=== Later career ===
During the 1928–1929 season, the club found itself in an economic crisis while simultaneously needing to close new contracts. At the time, Valencia had mostly used players from the quarry and the region, but with the imminent establishment of La Liga, in which the club began its journey in the Segunda Division, it became necessary, even though the moment was not ideal due to the difficult monetary situation, to spend a good sum of money on the incorporation of new players with experience and with proven quality. The critical economic scenario raised in Valencia caused the resignation of Pascual Quilis in the assembly held on 13 June 1929, being succeeded by Juan Giménez Cánovas, who until then had served as a member of the outgoing board.

Pascual Quilis was still a club member in 1930.

== Later life ==
On 14 May 1941, Elipidio Lozano Escalona, the First Instance Judge of Valencia, ruled to make public the complaint of the loss of 100 ordinary mortgage certificates of 500 pesetas, all of them inclusive, issued by the sports entity Valencia FC on 20 April 1933, announcing that a period of thirty days had been established so that the holder or holders can appear before his Court to make use of their right.

Pascual Quilis married Francisca Ferrer Fenollera, who died in Valencia on 5 January 1920.
