= Abdón García =

Spanish footballer and manager

Personal information
- Full name: Abdón Amadeo García Martínez
- Date of birth: 30 March 1906
- Place of birth: Avilés, Asturias, Spain
- Date of death: 3 June 1965 (aged 59)
- Place of death: Madrid, Spain
- Position: Midfielder

Senior career*
Years	Team	Apps	(Gls)
1923–1926	Stadium Club Avilesino		
1926–1930	Real Oviedo		
1930–1931	Sporting de Gijón		
1931–1935	Valencia CF		
1935–1936	Atlético Madrid		
1943–1944	Club de Fútbol Santiago		

Managerial career
- 1943–1944: Club Santiago
- 1947–1948: Club Santiago
- * Club domestic league appearances and goals

Abdón Amadeo García Martínez (30 March 1906 – 3 June 1965) was a Spanish footballer who played as a midfielder for Valencia CF, and Atlético Madrid. After his retirement, he worked as the manager of Club Santiago.

== Early life ==
Abdón García was born in Avilés on 30 March 1906, as the son of a Cuban and a Spanish father, thus having dual nationality until he renounced the former when he came of age. Abdón was raised in a humble and large family of eleven siblings, and it was his older brothers who drew him into the sport of football, which he began playing in the street, like so many children of his time.

== Playing career ==
=== Asturias ===
In 1923, the 17-year-old Abdón was encouraged by a fan of Stadium Avilesino to try out for his team, which he did successfully, thus signing for the leading club in Asturian football. In his first season there, he experienced the awarding of the "Real" title to the Avilesino club. After three seasons with the Avilés team, Abdón went to the capital of Asturias to join the recently created Real Oviedo, signing as a professional with a fee of 1,500 pesetas. While there, he trained as a right-winger in the Oviedo youth academy, becoming preselected for the national team.

In 1930, Abdón tried to sign for Sporting de Gijón, which resulted in a major sporting scandal in the region that nearly ended in court, with the Oviedo team claiming that they had a verbal commitment with Abdón to renew his contract with them, but he preferred to change teams and sign for the Gijón club that offered him almost double what he earned with Oviedo; this was the first conflict of this clubs' historic rivalry. Furthermore, Oviedo felt cheated and considered his move a betrayal because earlier that same year, they had played a charity match against Stadium Avilesino to raise funds to help Abdón's parents and their family of ten siblings, who had lost their house and most of their possessions in a fire. Gijón managed to overcome all of this, but in the end, they ended up having him for just one season, 1930–31, in which he played 24 matches and scored 9 goals.

=== Valencia ===
In 1931, Valencia obtained Abdón's signing through Luis Colina, with both clubs sharing the transfer money equally. Valencia signed him because he had been specifically requested by coach Randolph Galloway, who had managed him the previous season at Gijón. On 22 November 1931, he was one of the eleven footballers who played in Valencia's debut in La Liga, which ended in a 0–3 loss to Espanyol. Abdón was a very tough midfielder with a lot of technique, which earned him the nickname "Diez reales" from the press of the time. His characteristic play on the left side of the midfield suited him, so at Mestalla, he formed a midfield trio with Tonín Conde, who occupied the right wing, and with Carlos Iturraspe, in the center, and this turned out to be Valencia's most used midfield trio during the club's first years in La Liga.

In the 1932–33 La Liga, Valencia was only able to avoid relegation on the last matchday of the season, in which Abdón helped his team hold direct-rivals Deportivo Alavés to a 1–1 draw. In the following season, he helped his side reach the final of the 1934 Copa del Rey, which ended in a 1–2 loss to Madrid FC. He remained in the first team for four seasons (1931–35), playing a total of 115 games in which he scored 15 goals, including 46 games and 1 goal in La Liga.

=== Later career ===
For some reason, Abdón ended almost every season as transferable, but the club always ended up renewing his contract until the summer of 1935, when an agreement was no longer reached, so he moved to Atlético Madrid, for whom he played just two matches in La Liga. His career as a colchonero was caught up by the outbreak of the Spanish Civil War, in which he participated actively as an officer in the Republican Army on the front line during the Northern offensive. He was captured and sentenced to death in the Gijón prison of El Coto, which was commuted to life imprisonment and later transferred to the island of San Simón, in Vigo.

After being released in 1943, the 37-year-old played his last years of football at Club de Fútbol Santiago.

== Managerial career ==
In 1943, shortly after hanging his boots, Abdón became the coach of Club de Fútbol Santiago, a position that he held until the end of the season. In the mid-40s, he began to carry out technical work. After a three-year hiatus, he became the club's coach again for the 1947–48 season, and in April 1948, Valencia took advantage of its visit to Celta de Vigo to stop at Santiago and honor their former player in a friendly match held in the Compostela town.

== Later life and death ==
Abdón married a woman from Padrón. He later moved to Madrid to manage teams linked to Atlético, a job he held until practically his retirement. He remained in the Spanish capital until his death on 3 June 1965, at the age of 59.

== Honours ==
Valencia CF

Valencia Championship:

- Winners (3) 1932, 1933, and 1934

Copa del Rey:

- Runner-up (1) 1934
