= Luis Casanova =

Luis Casanova may refer to:

- Luis Casanova (businessman) (1908–1999), Spanish businessman and president of Valencia CF
  - Luis Casanova Stadium, former name of Mestalla Stadium in Valencia, Spain
- Luis Casanova (baseball) (born 1956), Cuban baseball player
- Luis Casanova (footballer) (born 1992), Chilean footballer
