= Benito Torregaray =

Spanish footballer (1910–1989)

Personal information
- Full name: Benito Torregaray Múgica
- Date of birth: 21 March 1908
- Place of birth: San Sebastián, Spain
- Date of death: 27 December 1942 (aged 34)
- Place of death: Spain
- Position: Defender

Senior career*
Years	Team	Apps	(Gls)
1927–1928	Club Deportivo Esperanza		
1928–1936	Valencia	47	(0)
Total		47	(0)
- * Club domestic league appearances and goals

Benito Torregaray Múgica (21 March 1908 – 27 December 1942) was a Spanish footballer who played as a defender for Valencia in the 1930s.

== Club career ==
Born in the Gipuzkoan town of San Sebastián on 21 March 1908, Torregaray began his career at his hometown club Club Deportivo Esperanza, from which he joined Valencia in 1928, aged 20. Despite being a good-natured man, he quickly stood out as a tough center back due to his imposing physique that overwhelmed his opponents, with the large size of his shoes earning him the nickname El Botas ("the Boots"). A powerful kicker of the ball, he was in charge of taking the club's penalties for several seasons, a duty that he handed over to Juan Ramón in 1936.

In his first season, Torregaray teamed up with Casto Moliner in defense, but for the rest of his career at Valencia, he played alongside either Juan Melenchón or Luis Pasarín, with the latter duo becoming known as "the Pillars of Hercules". These backlines played a crucial role in helping Valencia win the 1930–31 Segunda División, thus achieving promotion to the top flight, and then reach the 1934 Copa del Rey final, which ended in a 2–1 loss to Real Madrid. He stayed at Valencia for over a decade, from 1928 until 1939, playing more than 200 matches, including 47 La Liga matches.

== International career ==
Torregaray was unable to make his international debut despite being called up for the Spain national team on several occasions, including against England in Highbury on 9 December 1931, due to doubts expressed by Real Madrid's Jacinto Quincoces, but the national manager José María Mateos ultimately opted for Barcelona's Ramón Zabalo, a fellow debutant. At the time, Torregaray and Valencia would earn a substantial bonus for the call-up, so when it was revealed that he was not going to cross the English Channel, the local press stated that "Torregaray, who had already packed his suitcase and distributed a handful of cigars on account of the allowances he was to receive, is left plunged into the greatest disappointment".

Having played a crucial role in the Valencia team that reached the 1934 Cup final, Torregaray was selected by national coach Amadeo García to play the preparatory matches for the 1934 FIFA World Cup in Italy, which consisted of three unofficial friendlies against Sunderland, with him starting the second on 15 May, which ended in a 2–2 draw. The following week, on 22 May, Spain lost 3–1 to Sunderland, with Torregaray being one of the most criticized due to his slowness, which resulted in him being dismissed by García. Some sources state that Spain tried to register Torregaray at the last minute because José María Peña had sustained an injury, but the paperwork was not resolved in time.

== Death ==
In 1942, Torregaray left Valencia to return to his homeland, San Sebastián, where he worked as a municipal guard, and where he died on 29 December 1942, at the age of 34.

== Honours ==
Valencia

Segunda División:

- Champions (1): 1930–31

Valencia Championship:

- Champions (4): 1931, 1932, 1933, and 1934

Copa del Rey:

- Runner-up (1): 1934
