= Sanz y el secreto de su arte =

1918 film by Francisco Sanz Baldoví and Maximilià Thous

Sanz y el secreto de su arte (Spanish for "Sanz and the secret of his art") is a Spanish, medium-length, silent film of 1918, directed Francisco Sanz Baldoví and Maximilià Thous. Its style makes it fit into the docudrama genre. The film is led by ventriloquist Francisco Sanz Baldoví and his Automats. It provides a certain approach to the work of Sanz, although the absence of sound makes it difficult to appreciate in its whole entirety. It also provides an explanation of how the various artist dolls works. Finally, it is a historical document about the ages it was filmed. It was recovered and restored in 1997 by the Valencian Institute of Cinematography.

== The film ==
Late in 1917 Francisco Sanz Baldoví suffered a severe hoarseness that affected the normal rhythm of work in theaters. he retook then an old idea of making a film project. After preparing a first script, he contacted Maximilià Thous Orts, who had previously directed a report about Sanz's works – The Feast of the muñecas. To produce the film, both contacted the company Hispano Films, located in Barcelona. The film was shot in four months between 1917 and 1918. The best technology available at the time was used, which made it an expensive product. The film was ready for commercial distribution before 8 June 1918.

The protagonists are the very mechanical and Lorenzo Sanz Mataix, along with dolls Panchito, Juanito, Melanio Fulgencio, Don Liborio, Lucinda, Frey Volt and others. The film is divided into two parts: in the first Sanz's show is shown, following the technical explanation of the dolls mechanism; the second part is a fiction starring Don Liborio, who leaves the artistic company and returns to his village, interacting with human characters. This second part was exhibited also as independent short film and is one of the first approaches in cinema of the interaction of real and automat characters.

Don Liborio was Sanz's puppet star. In the show, he used it with great sense of humor to introduce current issues or representing popular criticism. As for Frey Volt, it had an unusual expression on his face and could move all the fingers separately. Some media claimed that it was the best robot in the world at the moment.

Sanz had to play the role of distributor and the film did not get released until 1922, in Valencia. Later it was exhibited in theaters of other cities and the artist included the film in his own show. There are evidences of screenings of the film in 1930. In 1925, Sanz received a good sum for the rights to exhibit abroad, and it seems that the explanation of the art of automats impressed the American and Central European audiences.

== Bibliography ==
- Expósito, Inmaculada; Soriano, María Pilar; Pérez, Eva (2011). Los autómatas de Francisco Sanz y Baldoví: Estudio técnico y valoración de su estado de conservación (PDF). Valencia: Universidad Politécnica de Valencia. p. 142. Trabajo final del Máster Universitario en Conservación y Restauración de Bienes Culturales
- Izquierdo Anrubia, José (2014). Francisco Sanz Baldoví, el prodigioso caballero de la fantasía (PDF). historiadeanna.com. p. 221.
- Lahoz, Nacho; Bosch, Isabel (1999). "Sanz y el secreto de su arte" (PDF). Imágenes rescatadas (2). (publicación).
