= Luis Casanova (businessman) =

Spanish sports leader (1908–1999)

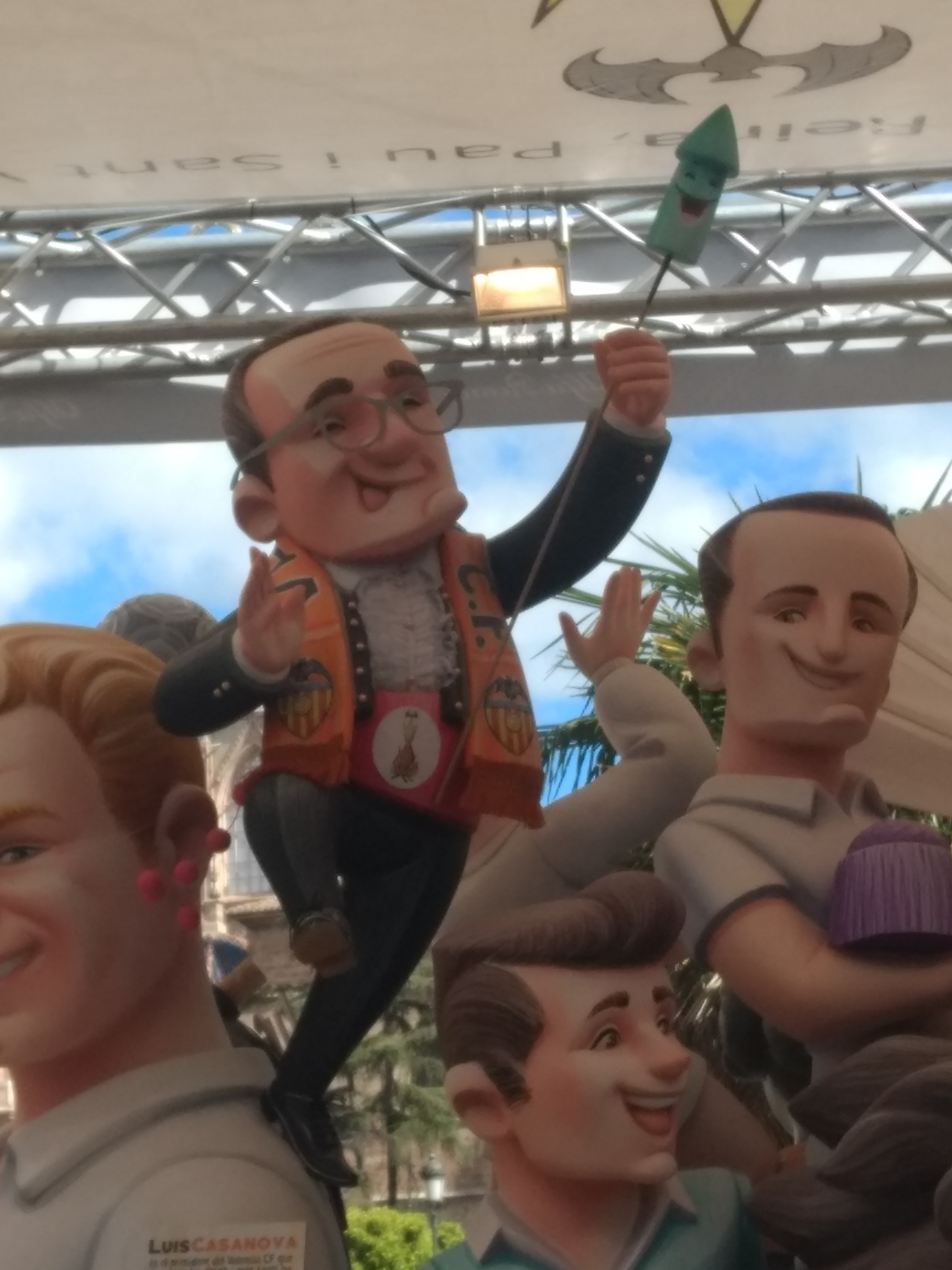
- Details of the children's falla in 2019

12th President of Valencia CF
- In office 1936–1936
- Preceded by: Francisco Almenar
- Succeeded by: Rafael Bau

15th President of Valencia CF
- In office 1940–1959
- Preceded by: Alfredo Giménez
- Succeeded by: Vicente Iborra

President of Cifesa

Personal details
- Born: Luis Casanova Giner; 15 December 1908; Oliva, Valencia, Spain
- Died: 4 May 1999 (aged 90); Oliva, Valencia, Spain

Luis Casanova Giner (15 December 1908 – 4 May 1999) was a Spanish sports leader who served as the 12th president of football club Valencia CF, including two mandates in an interim basis in 1936, and one full mandate that lasted for nearly 20 years, between 1940 and 1959, in which the club won half of its fourteen national titles: Three league titles (1941–42, 1943–44, and 1946–47), three Copa del Reys (1941, 1949, and 1954), and one Copa Eva Duarte in 1949. He invested most of his own capital in the club, especially in the rebuilding of a war-torn Mestalla Stadium, to carry out a project that became personal. He is thus widely regarded as one of the most important presidents of Valencia, with his 19 years in charge remaining unmatched.

He was also known for being president of Cifesa, one of the most important film companies in the world at the time, which produced the best Spanish-American blockbusters of the time, turning the company, and Valencia (its headquarters), into Spanish Hollywood from the early 1940s until the mid-60s.

== Early life and education ==
Luis Casanova Giner was born on 15 December 1908 in Oliva, Valencia, into a wealthy family of industrialists. As a teenager, he was sent to London to study in one of the most important centers of the time, and during his years in the British capital, he developed a deep interest in football, becoming a member of Arsenal F.C. because he had been captivated by the innovative spirit of Arsenal, a pioneer in installing artificial lighting in its Highbury fiefdom. Although he played football from an early age, his physical conditions made him give up his attempts to become a player.

== Valencia CF ==
=== First steps ===
Upon his return to Valencia, Casanova joined the ranks of his hometown club Valencia FC in the early 1930s, getting involved in its social life and thus becoming a member of the club's board in March 1934. He experienced promotion to the First Division as a member and later, now more closely linked to the board, witnessed the 1934 Spanish cup final, in which Valencia lost 1–2 to Real Madrid. On 9 June 1935, Casanova was appointed as the vice president of the club under the presidency of Francisco Almenar, a position that allowed him to become president on an interim basis after the sudden death of Almenar in March 1936, which coincided with the organization of the 1936 Spanish Cup final between Real Madrid and FC Barcelona, the very first El Clásico final, which was hosted in Valencia.

During the Spanish Civil War, Casanova remained closely linked to Valencia CF, so when the club was purged and reorganized at the end of the conflict, he was once again appointed to the vice presidency, serving under Alfredo Giménez, who was both the military governor of Valencia and the commander of the Francoist army and of the Levante Recovery Battalion, the latter having its own football team with several good players, such as Álvaro, Carlos Iturraspe, Mundo, and Vicente Asensi, who became the basis of Valencia's best team in its entire history. In those difficult moments, his work and financial contribution were essential; in fact, he delayed his wedding by investing all his capital in the reconstruction of the Mestalla Stadium, which had been devastated during the war, doing it so alongside Eduardo Cubells, Luis Colina, and the president Alfredo Giménez.

== Presidency ==
In 1940, Casanova took charge of the club after the departure of Alfredo Giménez's military command, which had led the club during the war. Under his leadership, Valencia was League champion three times: 1941–42, 1943–44 and 1946–47; as well as three-time runner-up: 1947–48, 1948–49, and 1952–53; along with three Generalissimo Cup titles: 1941, 1949 and 1954, and four times finalist: 1944, 1945, 1946 and 1952. The club also won the Eva Duarte Cup in 1949 and played in the 1948 final. In addition to his sporting success, he also created CD Mestalla, the club's second team (now known as VCF Mestalla).

When Casanova entered Mestalla to serve as president, he rarely sat in the stands since he wanted to be close to the grass, with the coaches.

== Pros-presidency ==
On 25 January 1959, Casanova presented his irrevocable resignation and was replaced as president by Vicente Iborra. This decision was motivated by a complicated and ambitious remodeling of the stadium, aggravated by the flood of 1957.

On 23 August 1969, the club assembly agreed to name the Mestalla stadium after Luis Casanova, and so it was until the arrival of Francisco Roig to the presidency, who in 1994 returned the popular name to the sports venue.

== Cinematic career ==
The Valencian Casanova family had ties to cinema that dated back to the early 1930s when his brother Manuel founded the Compañía Industrial del Film Español (Cifesa) in 1932, which turned Valencia into the Spanish Hollywood. Under Luis' presidency, Cifesa produced highly successful films at the box office and had the widest staff of directors at his service; the origin of Cifesa was shown at the beginning of each film with the music of the Serrano Anthem. In the 1960s, it fell, among other reasons because he made a large outlay for the rights to Federico Fellini's La Dolce Vita and the regime did not allow its exhibition.

Notably, Sara Montiel, the most internationally popular and highest-paid star of Spanish cinema in the 1960s, came to cinema thanks to the Casanovas, when Vicente, another brother of Luis, heard her sing a saeta in Orihuela and decided to give her a singing teacher and launch her acting career.

== Death ==
Casanova died in his birthplace in Oliva of natural causes on 4 May 1999, at the age of 90.

He married Pilar Iranzo Loygorri, and the couple had at least one son, Luis Casanova Iranzo, founder of Caster Alimentación, even considered running for president of the club, but ultimately did not do so and the Casanova family separated from the entity after its reconversion into a sports limited company in the early 1990s. His son died on 22 October 2021, at the age of 85.
