= 1937 Copa de la España Libre =

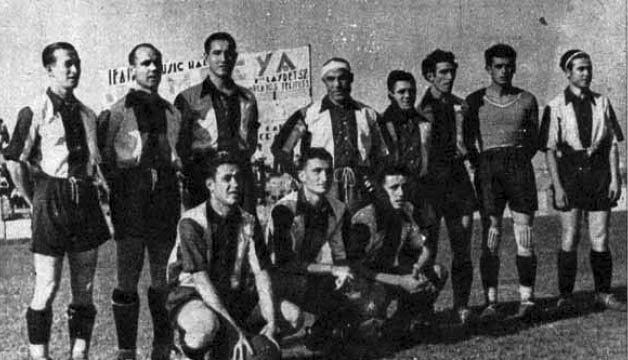
- Levante FC, champions

Tournament details
- Country: Spanish Republic
- Teams: 4

Final positions
- Champions: Levante FC (1st title)
- Runners-up: Valencia FC

Tournament statistics
- Matches played: 12

The Copa de la España Libre 1937 (Free Spain Cup), also referred to as the Copa de la España Libre – Trofeo Presidente de la República 1937, was a football competition played in the Republican area of Spain during the Spanish Civil War. The competition, played out in June and July 1937, was won by Levante FC.

== History ==
It was originally intended that the top four teams from the Mediterranean League would enter the competition, but FC Barcelona opted instead to tour Mexico and the United States. As a result, Levante FC, who had finished fifth in the league, took their place. The other three teams to enter were Valencia CF, CE Espanyol and Girona FC. The first stage of the competition was played as a mini-league with the top two teams, Levante and Valencia, then qualifying for the final.

For seventy years Levante unsuccessfully claimed this competition was the equivalent the Copa del Rey. From 2007, the Congress of Deputies urged the Royal Spanish Football Federation to recognise it; on 25 March 2023, the RFEF recognised it, but not as a Copa del Rey.

== Group Stage Table ==
| Teams | Played | Won | Drawn | Lost | GF | GA | Pts |
|---|---|---|---|---|---|---|---|
| Levante FC | 6 | 3 | 2 | 1 | 18 | 9 | 8 |
| Valencia FC | 6 | 2 | 2 | 2 | 12 | 13 | 6 |
| CE Espanyol | 6 | 3 | 0 | 3 | 12 | 16 | 6 |
| Girona FC | 6 | 0 | 4 | 2 | 11 | 15 | 4 |

== Final ==
18 July 1937
17:00

| Levante | 1–0 | Valencia |
|---|---|---|
| Nieto 78' | Report |

Sarrià, Barcelona

Levante

Valencia

| GK | (Spain) José Valero |
| DF | (Spain) Vicente Olivares |
| DF | (Spain) Ernesto Calpe |
| MF | (Spain) Agustín Santateresa Dolz |
| MF | (Spain) Andrés Calero |
| MF | (Spain) José Rubio |
| FW | (Spain) Puig II |
| FW | (Spain) José García-Nieto |
| FW | (Spain) Vicente Martínez | (red card) 55' |
| FW | (Spain) Gaspar Rubio |
| FW | (Spain) Fraisón |
Manager:
(Spain) Puig I

| GK | (Spain) Antolín |
| DF | (Spain) Manuel Alepuz |
| DF | (Spain) Juan Ramón | (red card) 55' |
| MF | (Spain) Inocencio Bertolín |
| MF | (Spain) Carlos Iturraspe |
| MF | (Spain) Arín Maguregui |
| FW | (Spain) Jaime Doménech |
| FW | (Spain) Severiano Goiburu |
| FW | (Spain) José Vilanova |
| FW | (Spain) Amadeo Ibáñez |
| FW | (Spain) José Richart |
Manager:
(Spain) Andrés Balsa

Copa de la España Libre 1937 Winners
Levante FC
1st Title
