= Manuel Alepuz =

Spanish footballer and manager (1917–2008)

Personal information
- Full name: Manuel Alepuz Andrés
- Date of birth: 7 October 1917
- Place of birth: Burjassot, Spain
- Date of death: 13 August 2008 (aged 90)
- Place of death: Valencia, Spain
- Position: Defender

Youth career
- Burjassot

Senior career*
Years	Team	Apps	(Gls)
1934–1936	Burjassot		
1936	Levante		
1936–1937	Athletic de Castellón		
1937	Valencia	3	(0)
1937–1938	Espanyol		
1939–1942	Valencia		
1942–1943	Ferroviaria		
1943–1946	Castellón	52	(0)
1946–1948	Deportivo de La Coruña	13	(0)
1948–1950	Levante		
Total		68	(0)

Managerial career
- 1951–1952: Levante
- Burgos
- Ontinyent
President of Levante
- * Club domestic league appearances and goals

Manuel Alepuz Andrés (7 October 1917 – 13 August 2008) was a Spanish footballer who played as a defender for Valencia, and Espanyol between 1937 and 1942.

== Career ==
Born on 7 October 1917 in Burjassot, Alepuz began his football career in the youth ranks of his hometown club Burjassot CF, where he became a solid defender, helping his side reach the semifinals of the Spanish Amateur Championship in 1936, which ended in a 1–3 loss to Sevilla Amateur.

Following the outbreak of the Spanish Civil War, Alepuz played in the Superregional Championship with Levante and the Mediterranean League with Athletic Club de Castelló, from which he joined Valencia, with whom he played three matches, including the final of the 1937 Copa de la España Libre at Les Corts on 18 July, which ended in a 1–0 loss to Levante. A few years later, Alepuz, now president of Levante, stated that he "would have liked to have been part of the Levante team who won the 1937 Cup, but back then, I was on the losing side".

In late 1937, Alepuz joined RCD Espanyol, with whom he only played a single official match in the Catalan Championship. Like so many other players, he was mobilized to the front lines in Lérida, participating in the Battle of the Ebro, the longest of the Civil War. Having completed his mandatory military service in Madrid, he returned to Valencia, playing three league matches in the 1940–41 season, but failing to appear in the club's triumphant campaign in the 1941 Copa del Generalísimo, the club's first national title in history. The following season, he failed to make a single La Liga appearance as the club won the league, so, unsatisfied with his lack of playing time, he left the club in 1942, and signed for Ferroviaria, with whom he played 11 Segunda División matches as the club was relegated.

Alepuz then signed for back-to-back top-flight clubs, Castellón, with whom he played 60 official matches between 1943 and 1946, and Deportivo de La Coruña, with whom he played 38 official matches between 1946 and 1948, although he could not prevent relegation to the Second Division in 1947. In July 1948, he returned to Valencia to play for Levante, where he stayed for two years, until 1950, playing a total of 40 official matches. In total, he played 68 La Liga matches for Valencia, Castellón, and Deportivo.

== Managerial career ==
After retiring, Alepuz remained linked to Levante, now as president, validating the players' contracts in August 1950. The following year, in 1951, he became the club's manager, but he did not finish the season due to poor results (4 losses in 6 matches), being then replaced by Guillermo Villagrá. He also took over the likes of Burgos, Rayo Vallecano, and Ontinyent.

Alepuz then became professor and director of the Valencian coaching school, and later served as the president of the Valencian Coaching Committee.

== Death ==
Alepuz died in Valencia on 13 August 2008, at the age of 90. Following his death, Paco Real, a former Valencia coach, described him as "Jovial and beloved by the players, he had a very affable personality".

== Honours ==
Valencia

- Copa del Rey:
  - Runner-up (1): 1937
- Valencia Championship:
  - Champions (1): 1936–37
