= Andrés Calero =

Spanish footballer (1906–1967)

Personal information
- Full name: Andrés Calero Bilbao
- Date of birth: 16 October 1906
- Place of birth: Erandio, Biscay, Spain
- Date of death: 23 January 1967 (aged 60)
- Position: Forward

Senior career*
Years	Team	Apps	(Gls)
1925–1927	CD Acero		
1927–1929	Athletic Bilbao		
1929–1930	Deportivo Alavés		
1930–1932	Arenas de Getxo		
1932–1934	CD Logroño		
1934–1937	Levante UD		
1939–1940	Gimnástico FC		
- * Club domestic league appearances and goals

Andrés Calero Bilbao (16 October 1906 – 23 January 1967) was a Spanish footballer who played as a forward for Athletic Bilbao, Deportivo Alavés,> and Levante.

== Playing career ==
Andrés Calero was born on 16 October 1906 in Erandio, Biscay. He began playing football in 1925 in his hometown club CD Acero, where he stood out as a forward. His good performance eventually drew the attention of Athletic Bilbao, who signed him in the summer of 1927, making his debut against Barakaldo CF on 2 October, which ended in a 2–3 loss. In total, he scored 14 goals in 25 official matches for Bilbao.

In 1929, Calero joined Deportivo Alavés, then in the Segunda División, where together with the likes of Manuel Olivares, Luis Urquiri, and Jacinto Quincoces under coach Francisco Baonza, he was part of the Alavés side that won league and achieved promotion to La Liga, which had just been founded in 1929. Before leaving Alavés, he still played two leagues matches for them in the first division.

In 1930, Calero was signed by Arenas de Getxo, with whom he played for two seasons, with the highlight of his stint there coming on 4 January 1931, when he scored once to help his side to a historic 5–0 trashing of FC Barcelona. Later that year, on 29 November 1931, he again netted once against Barcelona, this time at Les Corts to help his side to a 2–2 draw. In total, Calero scored 15 goals in 36 matches in La Liga for Bilbao, Alavés, and Arenas.

Calero spent the rest of his career in the Segunda División, playing for the likes of Logroño (1932–34) and Levante (1934–37). When the Spanish Civil War broke out in 1936, he remained loyal to the Spanish Second Republic and Levante, and the abrupt stoppage of official competitions led the Catalan and Valencian federations to create a new tournament, the Mediterranean League, in which Levante finished in fifth, thus qualifying for the 1937 Copa de la España Libre, and together with José García-Nieto and Gaspar Rubio, he played a crucial role in the Levante team that won that cup, beating Valencia in the final (1–0). He played his last football at Gimnástico FC.

== Honours ==
Levante UD

- Copa del Rey: 1937
