= Tonín Conde =

Spanish footballer (1909–1984)

Personal information
- Full name: Antonio Conde Aja
- Date of birth: 4 December 1909
- Place of birth: Puerto de Sagunto, Spain
- Date of death: 26 April 1984 (aged 74)
- Position: Midfielder

Youth career
- Atlético Saguntino

Senior career*
Years	Team	Apps	(Gls)
–1930	Atlético Saguntino		
1930–1937	Valencia	229	(29)
1939–1940	Hércules		
1942–1944	Granada		
1944–1945	Real Betis		

Managerial career
- 1946–1947: Granada
- * Club domestic league appearances and goals

Antonio Conde Aja, better known as Tonín Conde (4 December 1909 – 26 April 1984), was a Spanish footballer who played as a midfielder for Valencia CF in the 1930s and Granada in the 1940s.

After his retirement, he became a manager, briefly taking charge of Granada in 1946–47.

== Playing career ==
=== Valencia CF ===
Born in Puerto de Sagunto on 4 December 1909, Conde began his football career in the youth ranks of his hometown club Atlético Saguntino, where he stood out as a left winger, eventually becoming the club's star and thus catching the attention of Luis Colina, who signed him for Valencia in the summer of 1930, aged 21. Unlike his older brother Manuel, who suffered from a hernia, Antonio developed into a real footballer, becoming known as Conde II as a means to differentiate him from his brother.

Despite being somewhat anarchic technically, Conde was a fast and combative player, with his attitude on the field quickly gaining him the sympathy of the Valencia fans, especially when on 23 November 1930, in the last matchday of the Valencia Regional Championship, when he scored the winning goal against Castellón that allowed them to win the title. He was noted for his powerful left-footed shot that often resulted in rebounds for his teammates. He was a man of character on and off the field, which caused him to have some differences with the board due to grievances in his contract; for instance, in 1933, the players Conde and Antonio Sánchez were declared in rebellion after asking for a salary increase of 450 and 550 pesetas, respectively.

Over time, Conde gained experience and technical rigor as well as defensive strength and intensity in attack, with his goal-scoring ability being far superior to that of the average midfielder. In the 1932–33 La Liga, Valencia was only able to avoid relegation on the last matchday of the season, in which Abdón helped his team hold direct-rivals Deportivo Alavés to a 1–1 draw. The following season, he scored an important goal against his future club Hércules in the second leg of the quarter-finals of the 1934 Copa del Rey, thus helped his side reach the final, which ended in a 2–1 loss to Madrid FC. In 1934, he was mentioned as a possible choice for Spain, but the rumor never materialized in the form of a call-up.

Conde remained in the first team for seven seasons (1930–37), scoring a total of 29 goals in 229 official games.

=== Later career ===
During the Spanish Civil War, Conde, a left-wing militant and a member of the Spanish Socialist Workers' Party (PSOE), helped Alfredo Giménez Buesa escape Republican repression and take refuge in Serra. In late 1938, he was accused of not only seizing an apartment, but also acting as a "political commissar", with some newspapers even insinuating that he was a "Chekist". Even though none of them were successful enough to result in convictions, he was imprisoned in San Miguel de los Reyes, from where he confessed to the Valencian journalist Julián García Candau that he had been mistaken by another Conde who also played football, his brother Manuel. Six months later, however, he was released so that he could play half a season with top-flight team Hércules, but was soon imprisoned again.

Three years later, in January 1942, Conde was released from prison, but since his sentence included exile without eligibility for amnesty, he had to leave Valencia for Andalusia, where he played two seasons for top-flight team Granada until 1944. He played his last season of football (1944–45) with the Segunda División team Real Betis, for whom he unsuccessfully broke the exchange of Betis striker José Montalvo for Granada goalkeeper Ramón Casafont. It was a terrible deal, had it materialized, given that while Casafont would remain on loan at Ceuta for three consecutive seasons, Montalvo joined Real Madrid after playing for Mallorca, and was on the verge of becoming an international during his time with Real Madrid. In total, Conde scored 6 goals in 123 La Liga matches.

== Managerial career ==
After retiring in June 1945, Conde returned to his former club Granada, then in the Second Division, where he held several positions, such as coach in the 1946–47 season, leading them in 25 matches, and as a member of its board of directors in the 1950s and 1960s.

== Death ==
Conde died on 26 April 1984, at the age of 74.

== Honours ==
Valencia

- Valencia Championship: 1930, 1932, 1933, 1934
- Copa del Rey runner-up: 1934
