= José Vilanova =

Spanish footballer (1910–1989)

Personal information
- Full name: José Vilanova Rubio
- Date of birth: 20 April 1910
- Place of birth: Valencia, Spain
- Date of death: 30 December 1989 (aged 79)
- Place of death: Manresa, Spain
- Position: Forward

Senior career*
Years	Team	Apps	(Gls)
1927–1929	Norte FC		
1929–1937	Valencia	60	(33)
1939–1940	Hércules	20	(17)
1940–1941	Real Zaragoza	16	(9)
1941–1942	Real Murcia		
1942–1943	Levante		
1943–1944	Albacete Balompié		
1944–1945	Alcoyano		
Total		59	(96)
- * Club domestic league appearances and goals

José Vilanova Rubio (20 April 1910 – 30 December 1989) was a Spanish footballer who played as a forward for Valencia in the 1930s.

== Playing career ==
=== Valencia ===
Born in Valencia on 20 April 1910, Vilanova began his career for the now-defunct Norte FC team in Ruzafa. On 14 April 1929, just six days before his 19th birthday, he was given a trial by Valencia in a friendly match against Burjassot at the Mestalla Stadium, where he stood out for his dribbling skills and opportunism, scoring one of the side's four goals, which earned him an official contract.

In his second season at the club, el xiquet, as he was known in Valencia, helped his side win the 1930–31 Segunda División, scoring a hat-trick in the decisive match against Real Betis on 5 April 1931. A few months later, on 29 November 1931, he made his top-flight debut at the Mestalla, scoring twice to help his side to a 5–1 win over Racing Irún. In the 1932–33 La Liga, Valencia was only able to avoid relegation on the last matchday of the season, helping his team hold rivals Deportivo Alavés to a 1–1 draw.

Together with Luis Pasarín, Carlos Iturraspe, and Bertolí, he played a crucial role in helping Valencia reach the 1934 Copa del Rey final, scoring a hat-trick against his future club Real Murcia in the round of 16, and scoring a goal in the first leg of the quarter-finals against his future club Hércules, and in the first leg of the semifinals against Real Oviedo. In the final against Real Madrid, he opened the scoring in an eventual 2–1 loss. In 1935, he scored a spectacular goal against Oviedo, which was hailed as "the best ever seen at Mestalla". The arrival of Gaspar Rubio in 1934 caused a rivalry between the two, which grew beyond the pitch, but after his departure, he developed a healthier rivalry with Amadeo. He stayed at Valencia for seven years, from 1929 until 1936, when his career was interrupted by the outbreak of the Spanish Civil War, scoring a total of 146 goals in 206 matches for Valencia.

=== Later career ===
Once the conflict was over, Vilanova participated in the Mestalla's reopening match against Osasuna and even played a friendly against Levante, but ultimately signed for the newly promoted Hércules, where he scored 17 goals in 20 matches, which made him the second-highest scorer in the 1939–40 La Liga, only behind Víctor Unamuno. He then played one season each at Real Zaragoza (1940–41), Real Murcia (1941–42), and Levante (1942–43). In total, he scored 59 goals in 96 La Liga matches for Valencia, Hércules, and Real Zaragoza.

In 1943, Vilanova joined Albacete Balompié, then in the First Regional Division, helping Albacete finish the season as the team with the second most goals scored. He then joined Alcoyano, with whom he faced Sabadell and Real Betis in January 1945, scoring a goal against the latter.

== Later life and death ==
After retiring, Vilanova became a coach, working as an assistant at Levante. He died in Manresa on 30 December 1989, at the age of 79. His wife Rosario died in January 2021, aged 100.

== Honours ==
Valencia

Segunda División:

- Champions (1): 1930–31

Valencia Championship:

- Champions (4): 1931, 1932, 1933, and 1934

Copa del Rey:

- Runner-up (1): 1934
