= Bridge of the Exposición Regional Valenciana 1909 =

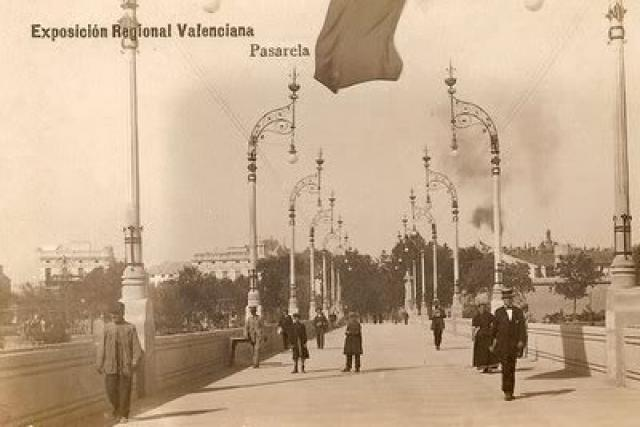
Bridge of the Exposición Regional Valenciana

The Bridge of the Exposición Regional Valenciana 1909 was a bridge built in 1909 on the occasion of the celebration of the Valencia Regional Exhibition of 1909, specifically was inaugurated May 22, 1909, and takes its name from the aforementioned exhibition. It was a bridge of reinforced concrete (the first of this material constructed in the city), but it was destroyed on October 14, 1957, in the flood of the Turia of that year. It was designed by the engineer José Aubán and was decorated with art-deco and modernisme elements. Instead was rise another bridge or rather an unsightly gateway that finally late 20th century between 1991 and 1995 has been replaced by the current bridge by Santiago Calatrava and some known as the La Peineta.
