= Light fountain of the Exposición Regional Valenciana =

Fountain

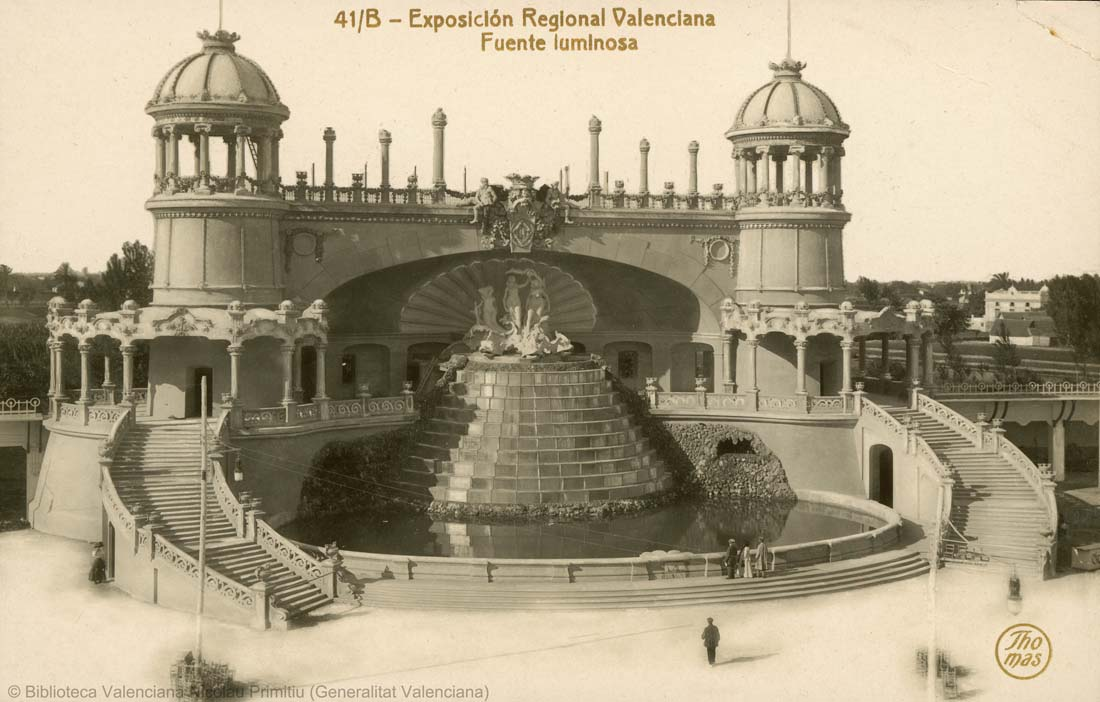
Light fountain of the Exposicion Regional Valenciana

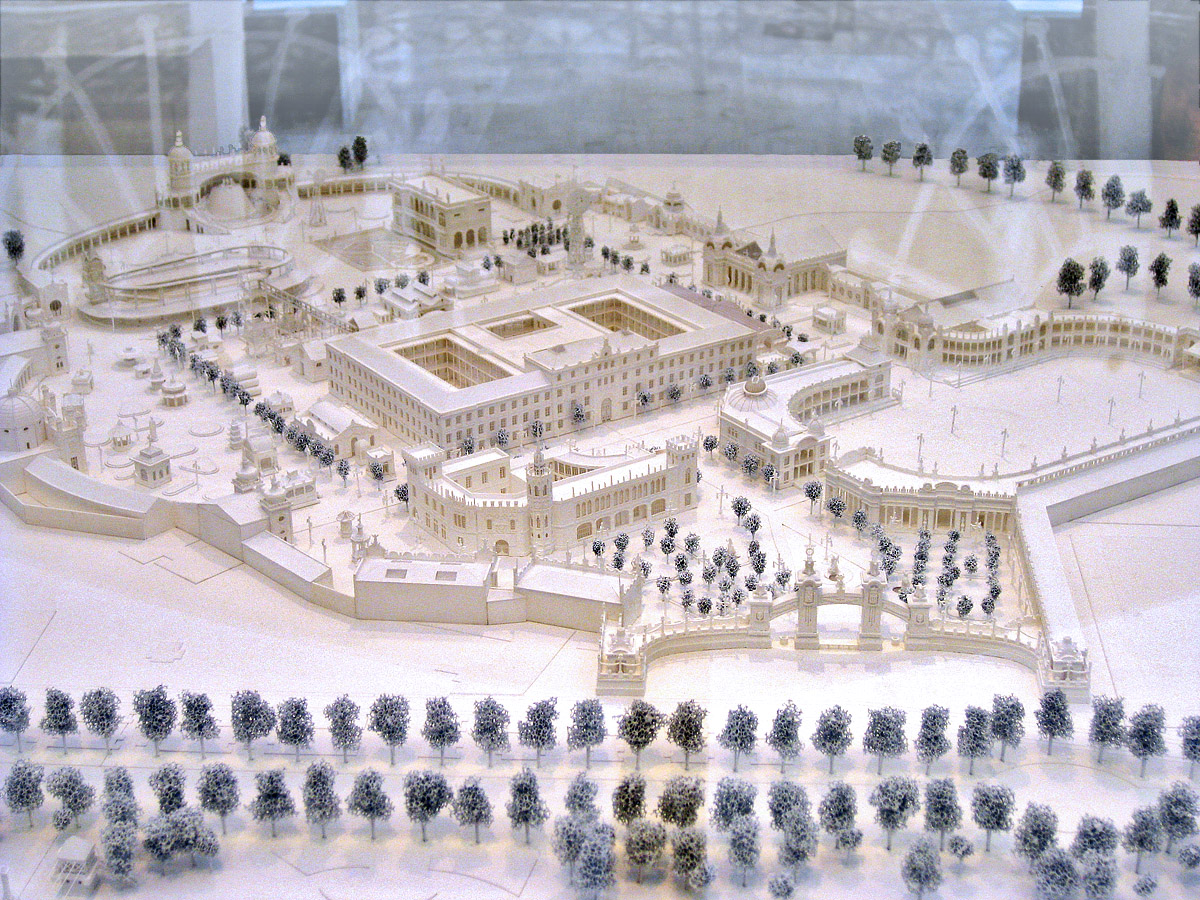
In this model of the 1909 Valencian exhibition, the large extent of this fountain (at top) can be seen

The Light fountain of the Exposición Regional Valenciana was a large fountain and square built for the Valencia Regional Exhibition of 1909. It was one of the most expensive buildings of the exhibition with a cost of 209,000 pesetas. The fountain was designed with two 20-meter-tall (66 ft) towers with curved staircases flanking the water of the fountain.

The design was unique for linking together electricity and water to create a light show at night. This functionality was not operational until two months after the opening of the Valencian exhibition. High maintenance costs caused it to be scarcely used. Like other buildings at the exhibition, they were destroyed when the land was returned to the landowner.
