= José Llovera =

Spanish author and football referee (1896–1977)

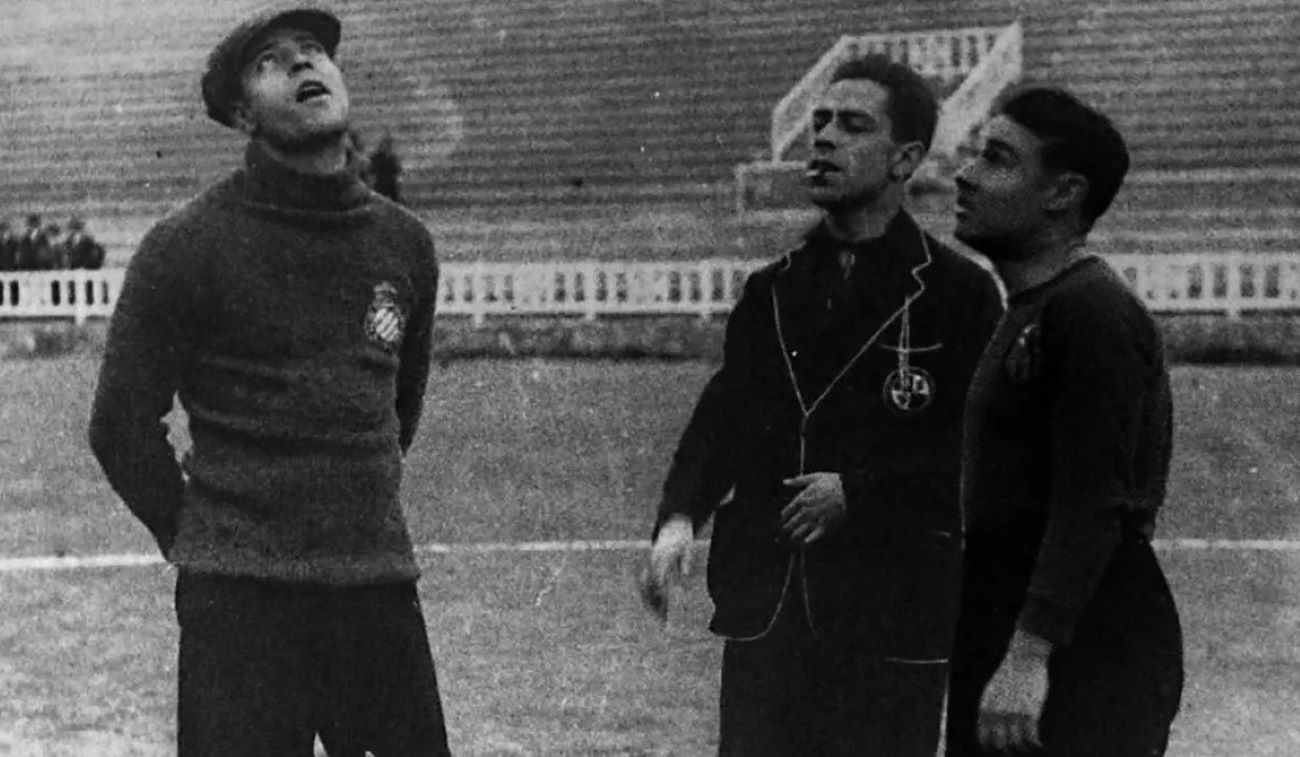
- Llovera (center) making a coin toss in 1925
- Full name: José Llovera Mas
- Born: 30 October 1896; Llinars del Vallès, Catalonia, Spain
- Died: 3 June 1977 (aged 80); Barcelona, Catalonia, Spain

Domestic
Years	League	Role
1916–29	Catalan championship	Referee
1929–32	La Liga	Referee

International
Years	League	Role
1926–31	FIFA listed	Referee

President of the Catalan College of Referees

President of the Cuban College of Referees
- In office 1927–1927

José Llovera Mas (30 October 1896 – 3 June 1977) was a Spanish author and football referee active between 1922 and 1932, who officiated three international matches between 1926 and 1932. He also co-founded the Catalan College of Referees in 1915, and then presided over both the Catalan College and the Cuban College of Referees in 1927.

== Refereeing career ==
Born in Llinars del Vallès, Catalonia, on 30 October 1896, Llovera began his refereeing career in the mid-1910s, still as a teenager, doing so initially as a hobby. On 1 October 1915, however, he was one of the founding members of the Catalan College of Referees, and in the following year, he received his official qualification as a football referee, and acted as such for 16 years, until 1932. During his career, he officiated several notable matches that went down in the history of Spanish football, such as the semifinals of the 1923–24 Prince of Asturias Cup between the regional teams of Centro (Madrid) and South (Andalusia), which ended in a 2–1 win to the former.

In the following year, on 15 January 1925, he refereed a Derbi Barceloní in the Catalan championship, which was held behind closed doors after it had been suspended by Biscayan referee Pelayo Serrano due to serious crowd disturbances; Espanyol won 1–0, and Llovera "carried out an impeccable performance". The journalists of the Catalan newspaper La Vanguardia stated that "Llobera's refereeing was very good... I wish all the arbitrations were only close to the one made by the current president of our College".

Thanks to a recommendation of the Catalan College, the Royal Spanish Football Federation (RFEF) presented Llovera as an international referee to FIFA, which registered him in 1925, thus becoming only the third Spanish international referee, only behind the likes of Luis Colina and Fernando Contreras. In the following year, on 26 December 1926, the 30-year-old Llovera made his international debut, refereeing a friendly match between Portugal and Hungary in Porto, which ended in a 3–3 draw. He went on to officiate a further two matches in 1930 and 1931, both friendlies, with the latter being also held in Porto, but this time Portugal lost 0–2 to Italy.

Llovera also refereed several Copa del Rey matches between 1921 and 1932, and a total of 25 league matches, including 8 matches in La Liga between 1929 and 1932. In addition to refereeing matches, Llovera also presided over both the Catalan College of Referees and the Cuban College of Referees; on the latter case, he had traveled to Cuba in 1927 where he spent several months officiating matches and organizing a referee committee.

== Writing career ==
In 1926, Llovera published a book titled Reglamento de Fútbol Asociación ("Association Football Regulations"), which had all the updated rules of football according to FIFA. Its prologue had writings of some of the most renowned football critics of that time, such as Paco Bru, Ricardo Cabot, and Pedro Vallana, and this book later became the first publication to be declared of public utility by the RFEF.

== Later life and death ==
After retiring from refereeing, Llovera became a teacher of the rules of football, training and instructing not only the Catalan referees of the college in weekly evening sessions, but also the squad of FC Barcelona, who were coached at the time by Ferenc Plattkó. Outside sports, he was a jeweler, having graduated from the School of Applied Arts and Artistic Trades.

Llovera died in Barcelona on 3 June 1977, at the age of 80.

== Works ==
Reglamento de Fútbol Asociación (1926)
