= Guillermo Villagrá =

Argentine-born Spanish footballer (1907–1970)

Personal information
- Full name: Guillermo Villagrá Azcona
- Date of birth: 7 June 1907
- Place of birth: Buenos Aires, Argentina
- Date of death: 18 February 1970 (aged 62)
- Place of death: Unknown
- Position: Defender

Senior career*
Years	Team	Apps	(Gls)
1928–1929	Barakaldo CF		
1930–1931	Sporting de Gijón		
1931–1933	Arenas de Getxo		
1933–1936	Valencia CF		
1940–1942	Levante UD		

Managerial career
- 1946–1948: Levante UD
- 1951–1952: Levante UD
- 1959–1960: UD Alzira
- * Club domestic league appearances and goals

Guillermo Villagrá Azcona (7 June 1907 – 18 February 1970) was an Argentine-born Spanish footballer who played as a defender for Arenas de Getxo, Valencia CF, and Levante UD. He later became a manager, taking charge of Levante UD.

== Playing career ==
Guillermo Villagrá was born in Buenos Aires on 7 June 1907, as the son of Spanish immigrants who, while he was still young, returned to the Basque Country. He began his football career at Barakaldo CF, and from there he made the jump to Sporting de Gijón, then a Segunda División team, where he played as a left midfielder, and participated in 17 games in the 1930–31 season and nine in the Regional Championship of Asturias in 1931–32. That season, just before the start of La Liga, he signed for Arenas de Getxo in the First Division, where he stayed for two years, in which he played 18 games and scored two goals.

In 1933, Villagrá signed for Valencia CF, thus becoming the first Argentine player to do so. Like any good Argentine, Villagrá was an intense and aggressive player, who took contact to the limit. He had a tremendous physical capacity, following the ball all over the field, recovering balls tirelessly, and at times it seemed like he was going to keep running even after the final whistle. He was also very versatile, and in fact, he became an all-rounder in his first two seasons, being able to play both as a winger and as a defender.

Although he had few appearances, only 15 official matches in the first two years, he played a crucial role in helping Valencia reach its first Copa del Rey final in 1934, as he scored a second-half brace in the second leg of the semifinals against Real Oviedo in the Buenavista which put his side in the final against Real Madrid in Montjuïc on 6 May 1934, which he started in a 1–2 loss. He also won two Regional Championship of Valencia in 1934 and 1937.

The outbreak of the Spanish Civil War cut off his progress at Valencia. In total, he scored 2 goals in 45 league matches for Arenas and Valencia. Following the end of the war in 1939, Villagrá opted to join the UDLG (Levante-Gimático merger), where he formed a defensive partnership with José García-Nieto and where he retired in 1942, at the age of 35.

== Managerial career ==
After his career as a player ended, Villagrá remained linked to Levante UD, now as a coach, which he oversaw in two stages (1946–48 and 1951–52), the latter being an emergency solution during the 1951–52 academic year and ending in relegation to the Tercera División. He later coached UD Alzira for one season in 1959–60.

== Death ==
Villagrá died in Valencia on 18 February 1970, at the age of 62.

== Honours ==
Valencia CF

- Copa del Rey runner-up: 1934
- Valencia Championship: 1934, 1937
