= Himne de l'Exposició =

Anthem of the Valencian Community

Himne de l'Exposició Himne de València
English: Anthem of the Exposition Anthem of Valencia
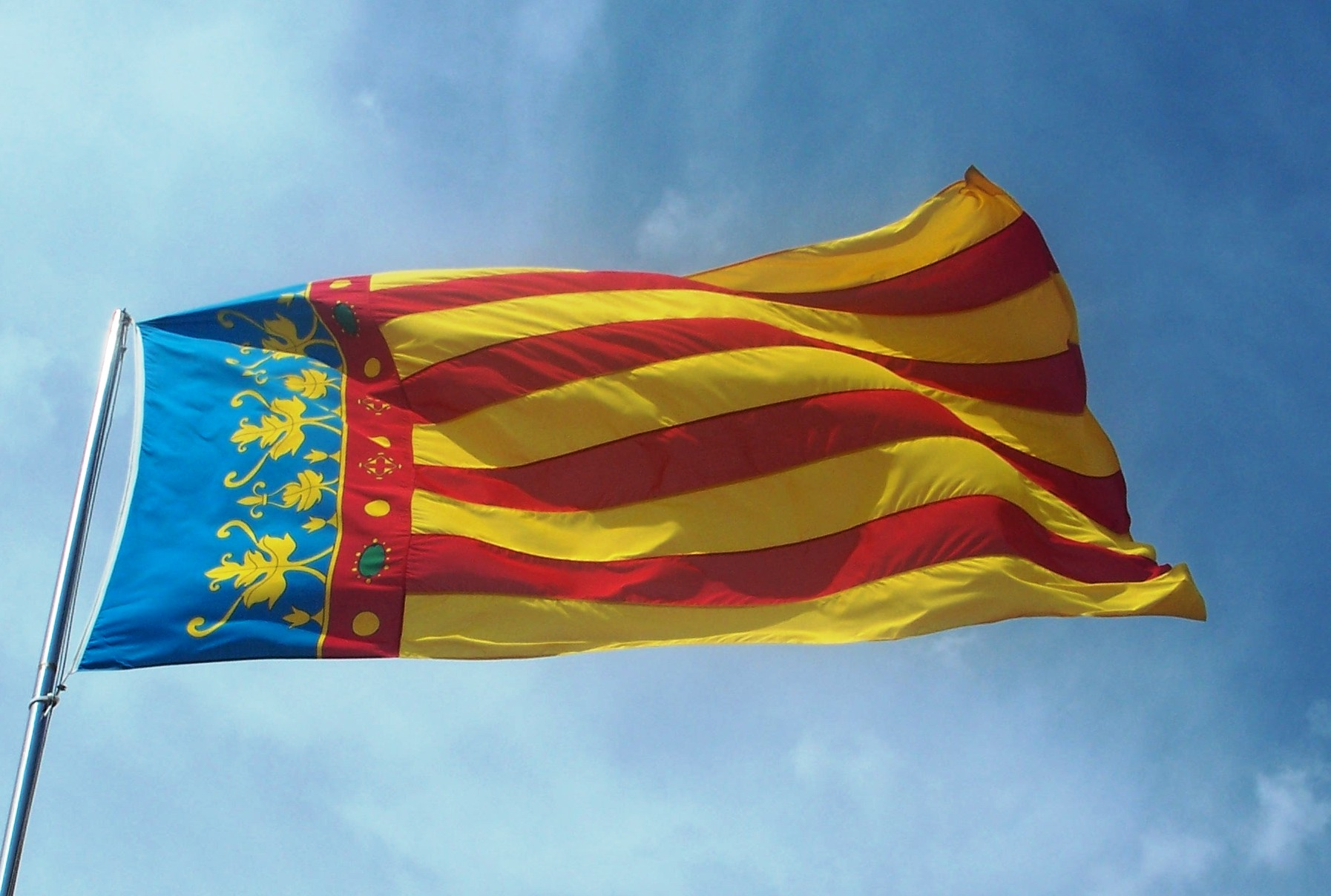
- Regional anthem of Valencian Community, Spain
- Lyrics: Maximiliano Thous Orts, 1909
- Music: José Serrano Simeón, 1909, partly 16th century
- Adopted: 1925

Audio sample
- file; help

The Himne de l'Exposició (Valencian pronunciation: [ˈimne ðe le(k)spozisiˈo], "Anthem of the Exposition") or Himne de València ("Anthem of Valencia") is the official anthem of the Valencian Community, Spain. The song was composed by José Serrano Simeón with lyrics written by Maximiliano Thous Orts for the Valencia Regional Exhibition. The music is based on a 16th-century anthem dedicated to Saint George, who was the patron saint of the Kingdom of Valencia. It was approved by the mayors of Alicante, Castellón and Valencia in May 1925, and it was declared as the official anthem of the Valencian Community in 1982, with the approval of the Valencian Statute of Autonomy.

There has been some controversy over some of the words used. Some lines are considered as being too pro-Spain and some sectors of the community are pushing for an alternative tune, the Muixeranga, to be adopted instead. The Muixeranga has no lyrics, and hails from the local holidays of the town of Algemesí. However, the official anthem is widely used, especially during Falles celebrations, days celebrating Valencian patrimony, and any matches featuring the Valencian Community autonomous football team.

On 5 December 2008, a version both in Valencian and Spanish was sung and recorded by Plácido Domingo with the Orquestra de la Comunitat Valenciana. This updates the previous recording by Francisco.

== Lyrics ==
=== Valencian ===
Himne de València (Valencian) Per ofrenar noves glòries a Espanya tots a una veu, germans, vingau. Ja en el taller i en el camp remoregen càntics d'amor, himnes de pau! Pas a la regió que avança en marxa triomfal! Per a tu la vega envia la riquesa que atresora i és la veu de l'aigua càntics d'alegria acordats al ritme de guitarra mora. Paladins de l'art t'ofrenen ses victòries gegantines; i als teus peus, Sultana, tos jardins estenen un tapís de murta i de roses fines. Brinden fruites daurades els paradisos de les riberes; pengen les arracades baix les arcades de les palmeres. Sona la veu amada i en potentíssim, vibrant ressò, notes de nostra albada canten les glòries de la regió. Valencians en peu alcem-se. Que la nostra veu la llum salude d'un sol novell! Per a ofrenar noves glòries a Espanya tots a una veu, germans, vingau. Ja en el taller i en el camp remoregen càntics d'amor, himnes de pau! Flamege en l'aire nostra Senyera! Glòria a la Pàtria! Visca València! Visca! Visca! Visca!	Anthem of Valencia (English translation) To offer new glories to Spain, all in one voice, brothers, come here. They mumble, both in workshops and in the fields, songs of love, anthems of peace! Make way for the Region that is advancing in a triumphal march! The lowlands send Thee all the wealth they have been treasuring, and the voice of the water is a song of joy in tune with the rhythm of a Moorish guitar. Art paladins offer Thee their gigantic victories; and at Thy feet, Sultana, Thy gardens extend a tapestry of myrtle and fine roses. Golden fruits are offered from riverside paradises; earrings are hung underneath the palm archades. The beloved voice can be heard echoing very loudly and vibrantly, notes from our aubade sing out the glories of our Region. Valencians, stand up on our feet! Let our voice greet the light of a new sun. To offer new glories to Spain, all in one voice, brothers, come here. They mumble, both in workshops and in the fields songs of love and hymns of peace! Fluttering in the wind is our Senyera (Valencian flag)! Glory to the Fatherland! Long live Valencia! Long live! Long live! Long live!

=== Spanish ===
Himno de Valencia (Spanish) Para ofrendar nuevas glorias a España nuestra Región, supo luchar. ¡Ya en el taller y en el campo resuenan cantos de amor, himnos de paz! ¡Paso a la Región que avanza en marcha triunfal! Viene a dar la huerta mía la riqueza que atesora y murmura el agua cantos de alegría que nació en los ritmos de guitarra mora. Viene al arte paladines que te ofrezcan sus laureles; y a tus pies, sultana, tienden mis jardines un tapiz de rosas, nardos y claveles. Brindan rico tesoro los naranjales de las riberas penden racimos de oro bajo los arcos de las palmeras. Palmeras suenan, la voz amada y en victorioso y vibrante son notas del alborada cantan el triunfo de la Región. ¡Despertemos valencianos! Que nuestra voz la luz salude de un nuevo sol. Para ofrendar nuevas glorias a España nuestra Región, supo luchar. ¡Ya en el taller y en el campo resuenan cantos de amor, himnos de paz! ¡Flote en los aires nuestra Señera! ¡Gloria a la Patria! ¡Viva Valencia! ¡Viva! ¡Viva! ¡Viva!	Anthem of Valencia (English translation) To offer new glories to Spain our Region, it knew to fight. They mumble, both in workshops and in the fields, songs of love and anthems of peace! Make way for the Region that is advancing in a triumphal march! My orchards come to give you all the wealth they have been treasuring, and the voice of the water is a song of joy in tune with the rhythm of a Moorish guitar. Art paladins are coming to offer their laurels; and at your feet, sultana, your gardens extend to create a tapestry of roses, spikenards and carnations. Rich gold is offered from riverside orange trees; golden bunches are hung underneath the palm archades. Sound the beloved voice of the palms echoing victorious and vibrantly notes from our aubade sing out the glories of our Region. Let's wake up, Valencians! Let our voice greet the light of a new sun. To offer new glories to Spain, our Region, it knew to fight. They mumble, both in workshops and in the fields songs of love and hymns of peace! Fluttering in the wind is our Senyera (Valencian flag)! Glory to the Fatherland! Long live Valencia! Long live! Long live! Long live!

== See also ==
- Anthems of the autonomous communities of Spain
