= Manuel García del Moral =

Spanish businessman, politician, and sports leader

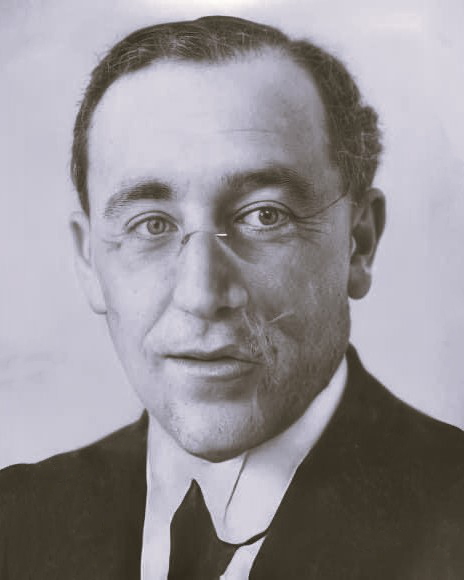
- Manuel García del Moral in 1925
- Born: Manuel García del Moral y de Lamata; Valencia, Spain
- Citizenship: Spanish
- Occupations: Businessman; Politician; Sports leader
- Known for: 9th President of Valencia CF
- Political party: Liberal Party

Member of the Congress of Deputies
- In office 1918–1923

9th President of Valencia CF
- In office 1932–1933
- Preceded by: Juan Giménez Cánovas
- Succeeded by: Adolfo Royo Soriano

Manuel García del Moral y de Lamata was a Spanish businessman, politician, and sports leader who served as the 9th president of Valencia CF between 1932 and 1933.

== Political career ==
Manuel del Moral was a member of the Spanish Cortes during the Bourbon restoration. He was a member of the Liberal Party, a Romanist sector, and was elected to Congress for the electoral district of Alcalá de Henares, in the general elections of 1918 and 1919, and for the district of Sagunto, in the elections of 1920 and 1923. The 1920 election was controversial because the Provincial Council did not proclaim a deputy in this district and issued certificates of votes from the two candidates (Borrás Lagarriaga and del Moral), and then in January 1921, the Congress approved the Supreme Court report proposing the nullity of the election and the need for a new one, which took place on 5 June 1921. When he made his candidature in 1920, his profession was reported as propriatario (owner).

Del Moral was later consul of Sweden and advisor to the Unión Naval and the Compañía Trasmediterránea in the port of Valencia. In 1929, he bought two steamers from Trasmediterránea, the Joan Maragall and the Roger de Flor, thus becoming their owner until 1932 and 1935, respectively. He combined all these activities with politics, from which he never disassociated himself.

== Presidency of Valencia CF ==
A lifelong fan of football and his team, del Moral was elected president of Valencia CF in the extraordinary assembly of 28 July 1932, and his board of directors included two future presidents, Francisco Almenar and Adolfo Royo Soriano. This board faced a delicate economic situation, and had to deal with a turbulent season in which the team was only able to avoid relegation to the Segunda División in the last matchday.

On the social side, the club moved its registered office from Calle Barcas, number 5, to Calle Féliz Pizcueta, number 23. Faced with the worrying economic crisis that gripped the club, Valencia held two extraordinary general meetings in 1933; in the first, on 12 January, the club agreed to issue mortgage bonds worth one million pesetas, and in the second, on 27 April, Adolfo Royo Soriano was elected as the new president, thus replacing Manuel García del Moral, who did not form part of this new board.

During his short presidency, Valencia played a total of 39 matches, winning 23, drawing 5, and losing 11.
