= Jaime Domènech =

Spanish footballer (1914–2004)

Personal information
- Full name: Jaime Domènech Roca
- Birth name: Jaume Domènech i Roca
- Date of birth: 16 February 1914
- Place of birth: Viladecans, Spain
- Date of death: 27 August 2004 (aged 90)
- Place of death: Barcelona, Spain
- Position: Forward

Youth career
- Viladecans

Senior career*
Years	Team	Apps	(Gls)
1932–1935	Espanyol		
1935–1941	Valencia		
1941–1944	Málaga		
1944–1947	Real Murcia		
1947–1948	Sants		
1948–1949	Viladecans		
1949–1950	Gavà		
1950–1951	Santboià		
1951–1952	Viladecans		

International career
1933–1934	Catalonia	5	(0)
1936	Valencian Community	2	(0)
- * Club domestic league appearances and goals

Jaime Domènech Roca (16 February 1914 – 27 August 2004) was a Spanish footballer who played as a forward for Espanyol and Valencia in the 1930s. He also played five matches for the Catalan national team in 1933 and 1934.

== Club career ==
Born in Catalonian town of Viladecans on 16 February 1914, Domènech began his career in the youth ranks of his hometown club Viladecans, where he quickly stood out as a right winger, so he was signed by top-flight club Espanyol in 1932, aged 18. (Note: Some sources wrongly claim that he was born on 16 April 1914, or 16 December 1914.) After a brieft stint with the second team, he make his debut with the first in a La Liga match against Racing de Santander on 12 February 1932, which ended in a 3–1 loss. In total, he scored 2 goals in 16 official matches for Espanyol, where he stayed for three years, from 1932 until 1935, when he signed for Valencia.

Domènech quickly established himself as an undisputed starter, starting 21 of the 22 league matches in his first season, standing out for his refined skill, smooth ball control, precise crosses, and good dribbling style. In his second season, he helped Valencia reach the final of the 1937 Copa de la España Libre at Les Corts on 18 July, which ended in a 1–0 loss to Levante. By the time the Spanish Civil War ended in 1939, he was still in Valencia's starting line-up, but the arrival of Epi decreased his playing time. In 1941, his last year in Valencia, the club won 1941 Copa del Generalísimo, but he failed to play a single cup match of that campaign, thus not being considered one of its winners.

In 1941, Domènech signed for Segunda División side Málaga, where he stayed for three years, until 1944, when he returned to the top-flight with Real Murcia, where he also stayed for three years, until 1947, scoring a total of 10 goals in 53 official matches. He then played one season each for the likes of Sants (1947–48), Viladecans (1948–49), Gavà (1949–50), Santboià (1950–51), and again Viladecans, where he retired in 1952, aged 38. In 1948, he was the subject of a tribute match in his hometown of Viladecans.

== International career ==
Like so many other Espanyol players, Domènech was eligible to play for the Catalan national team, making his debut against Martinenc in a tribute match to Carlos Altés on 20 August 1933, helping his side to a 5–3 win. The following year, in June 1934, he started for Catalonia in two friendlies against the Brazilian national team, winning the first 2–1, and drawing the latter at two. Two months later, on 15 August, he started alongside his brother in a tribute match to Josep Calvet, helping their side to a 3–0 win over their former club Sants. He earned his last two caps in 1936, one alongside his brother in a 4–0 loss to Valencia on 15 November 1936, and the other in a 4–4 draw against Barça on 16 May 1937.

Domènech also played for Valencian football team in 1936.

== Death ==
Domènech died in Barcelona on 27 August 2004, at the age of 65.

== Honours ==
Espanyol

- Catalan championship
  - Champions (1): 1932–33

Valencia

- Copa del Rey:
  - Runner-up (1): 1937
- Valencia Championship:
  - Champions (2): 1936–37, 1939–40
