= 1934 Copa del Presidente de la República final =

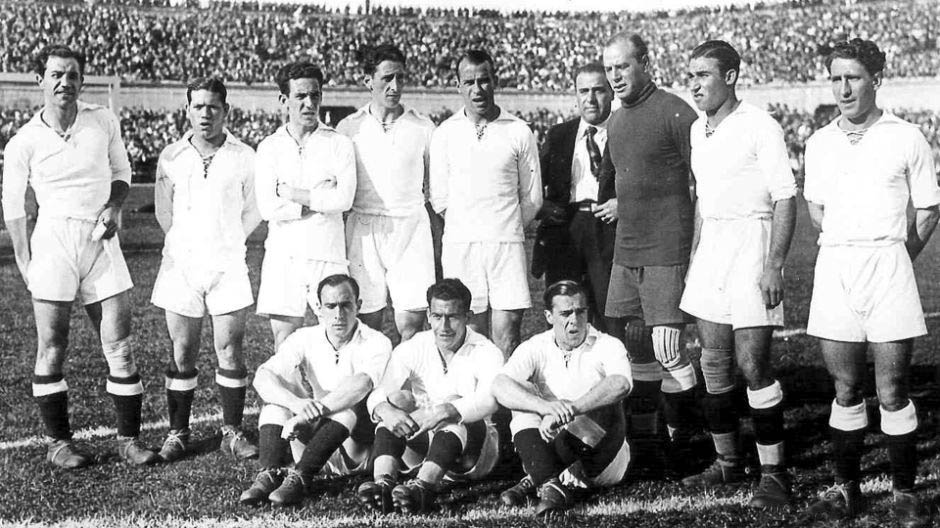
- Madrid FC, champions
- Event: 1934 Copa del Rey
Madrid FC	Valencia FC
2	1
- Date: May 6, 1934
- Venue: Montjuïc, Barcelona
- Referee: Agustín Vilalta
- Attendance: 46,000

The 1934 Copa del Presidente de la República final was the 34th final of the Copa del Rey, the Spanish football cup competition. Madrid FC beat Valencia FC 2–1 and won their 6th title.

== Road to the final ==
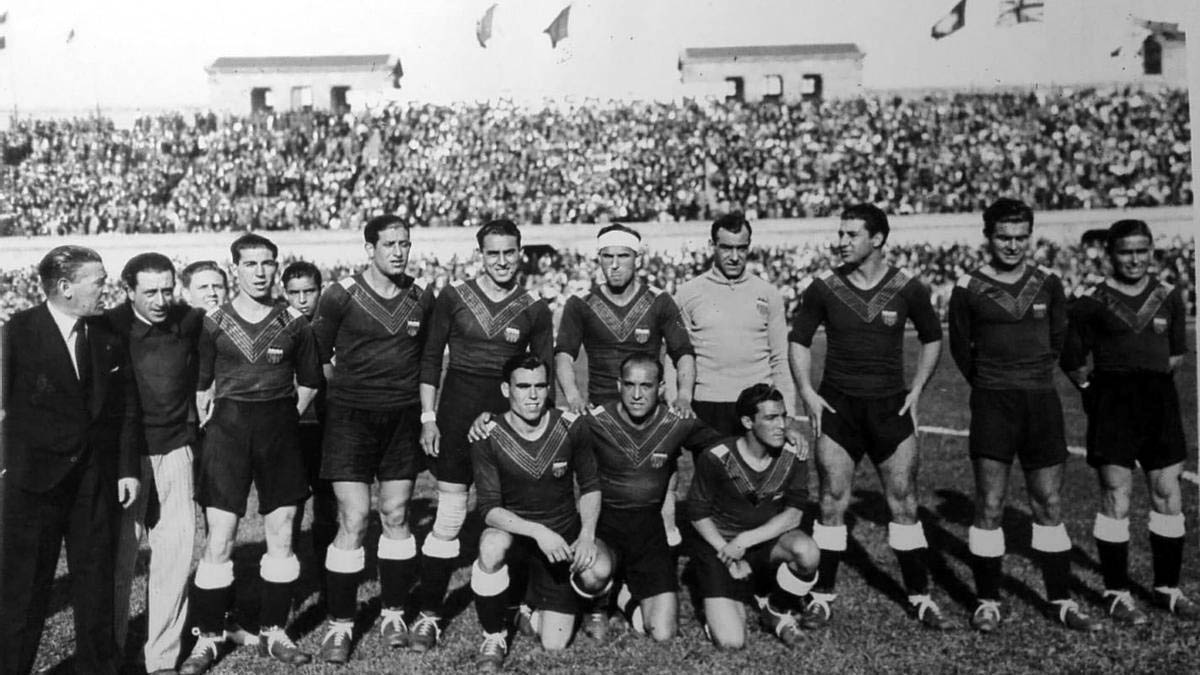
Valencia CF, runners-up

Madrid FC			Round	Valencia FC
Opponent	Result	Legs	Knockout phase	Opponent	Result	Legs
	bye		Round of 32	Racing Santander	9–7	7–1 home; 2–6 away
CA Osasuna	8–1	3–0 away; 5–1 home	Round of 16	Murcia FC	9–3	3–1 away; 6–2 home
Athletic Bilbao	7–4	1–1 away; 1–1 home (2–2 1st replay; 3–0 2nd replay)	Quarter-finals	Hércules FC	4–2	1–2 away; 3–0 home
Betis Balompié	4–1	2–0 away; 2–1 home	Semi-finals	Oviedo FC	5–3	2–2 home; 3–1 away

== Match details ==
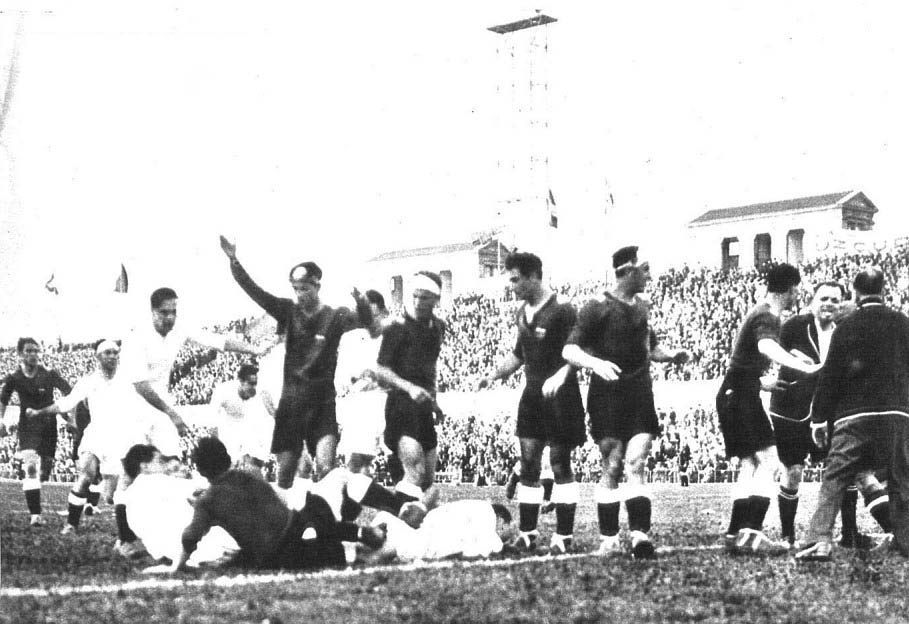
A moment of the match

6 May 1934
16:45 CET

Madrid FC	2–1	Valencia
Hilario 71'; Lazcano 73'		Villanova 48'

Montjuïc, Barcelona
Attendance: 42,000
Referee: Agustín Vilalta

Madrid FC	Valencia

GK	1	(Spain) Ricardo Zamora (c)
DF	2	(Spain) Ciriaco Errasti
DF	3	(Spain) Jacinto Quincoces
MF	4	(Spain) Pedro Regueiro
MF	5	(Spain) Antonio Bonet
MF	6	(Spain) Leoncito
FW	7	(Spain) Jaime Lazcano
FW	8	(Spain) Luis Regueiro
FW	9	(Spain) Josep Samitier
FW	10	(Spain) Hilario
FW	11	(Spain) Eugenio Hilario
Manager:
(Spain) Francisco Bru

GK	1	(Spain) Enrique Cano
DF	2	(Spain) Benito Torregaray
DF	3	(Spain) Luis Pasarín (c)
MF	4	(Spain) Inocencio Bertolí
MF	5	(Spain) Carlos Iturraspe
MF	6	(Spain) Tonín Conde
FW	7	(Spain) Domingo Torredeflot
FW	8	(Spain) Abdón García
FW	9	(Spain) José Vilanova
FW	10	(Spain) Juan Costa
FW	11	(Argentina) Guillermo Villagrá
Manager:
(England) Jack Greenwell

Copa del Rey 1934 winners
Madrid FC
6th title
