= Valencia Regional Exhibition =

1909 regional fair in Valencia, Italy

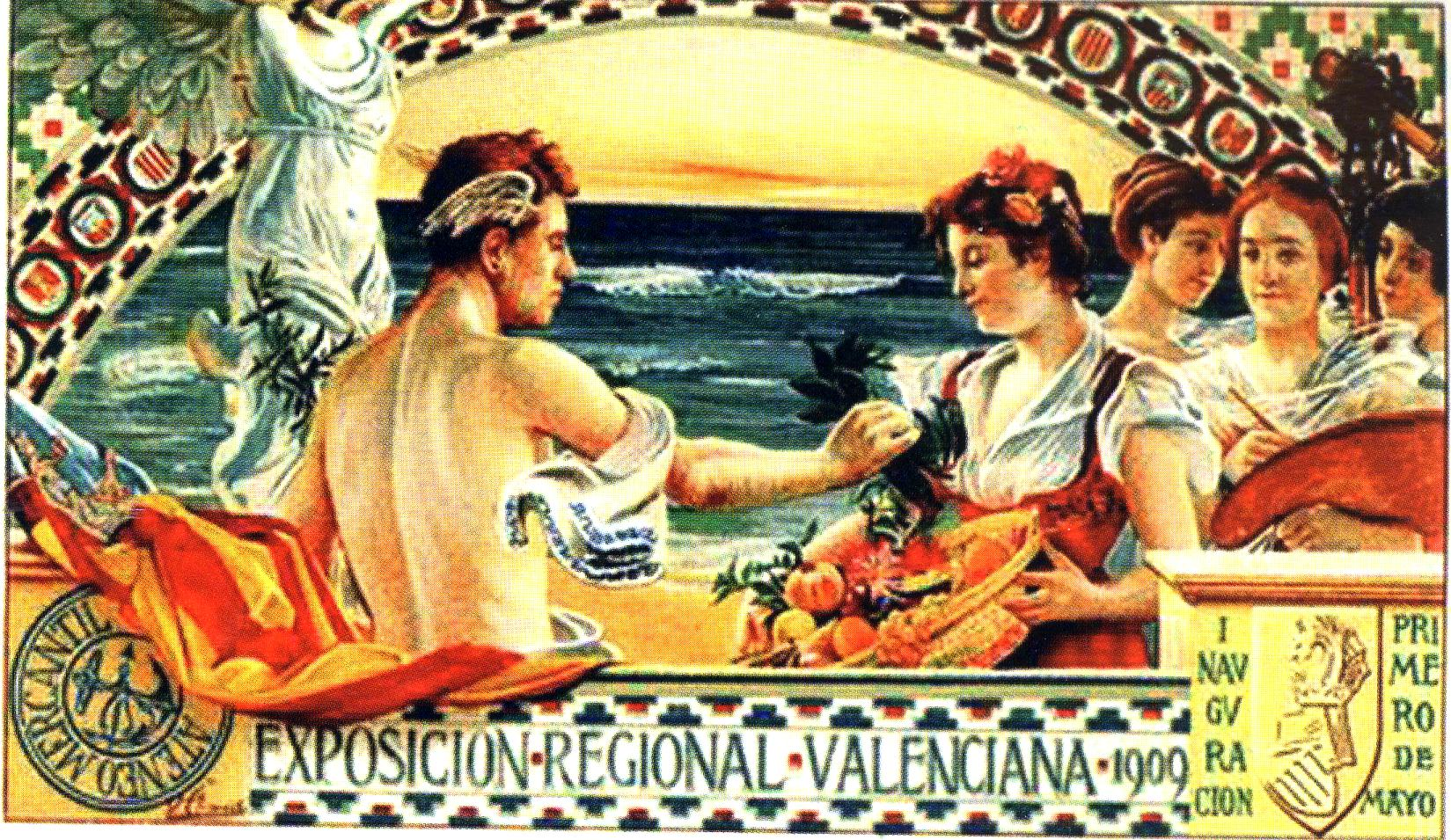
- Poster

Overview
- BIE-class: Unrecognized exposition
- Organized by: Commercial Athenaeum of Valencia

Location
- Country: Spain
- City: Valencia
- Coordinates: 39°28′24.4″N 0°21′45.5″W

Timeline
- Opening: 22 May 1909
- Closure: 22 December 1909

The Valencian Regional Exhibition was held in Valencia in 1909, the year before a national exhibition.

The fair was organised by the Commercial Athenaeum of Valencia, and ran from 22 May to 22 December 1909.

== Legacy ==
The Valencian anthem, Himne de l'Exposició, was composed for the exhibition.

== Architecture ==
The reinforced concrete Bridge of the Exposición Regional Valenciana 1909 was built, and remained until destroyed by a flood in 1957.

Three buildings were decided in advance of the fair to be retained: the Municipal Palace; the Nursing Home and the Industry Palace.

The municipal palace was designed by Francisco Mora Berenguer and built in 70 days.

Buildings of the exhibit include the Palacio de la Exposición de Valencia, Silo de la Lactancia, Palace of Industry, Light fountain of the Exposición Regional Valenciana, and the Bridge of the Exposición Regional Valenciana 1909.

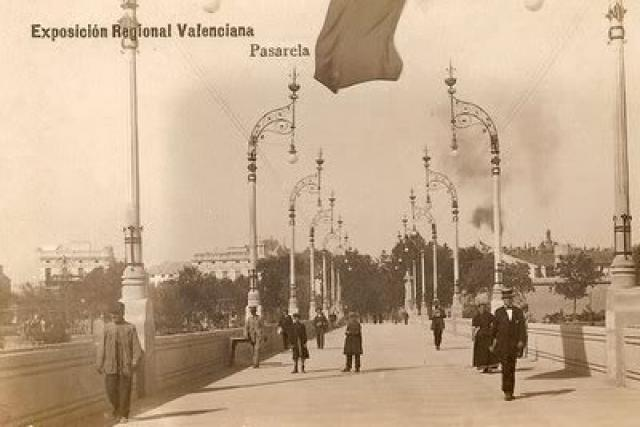
Regional exhibition bridge

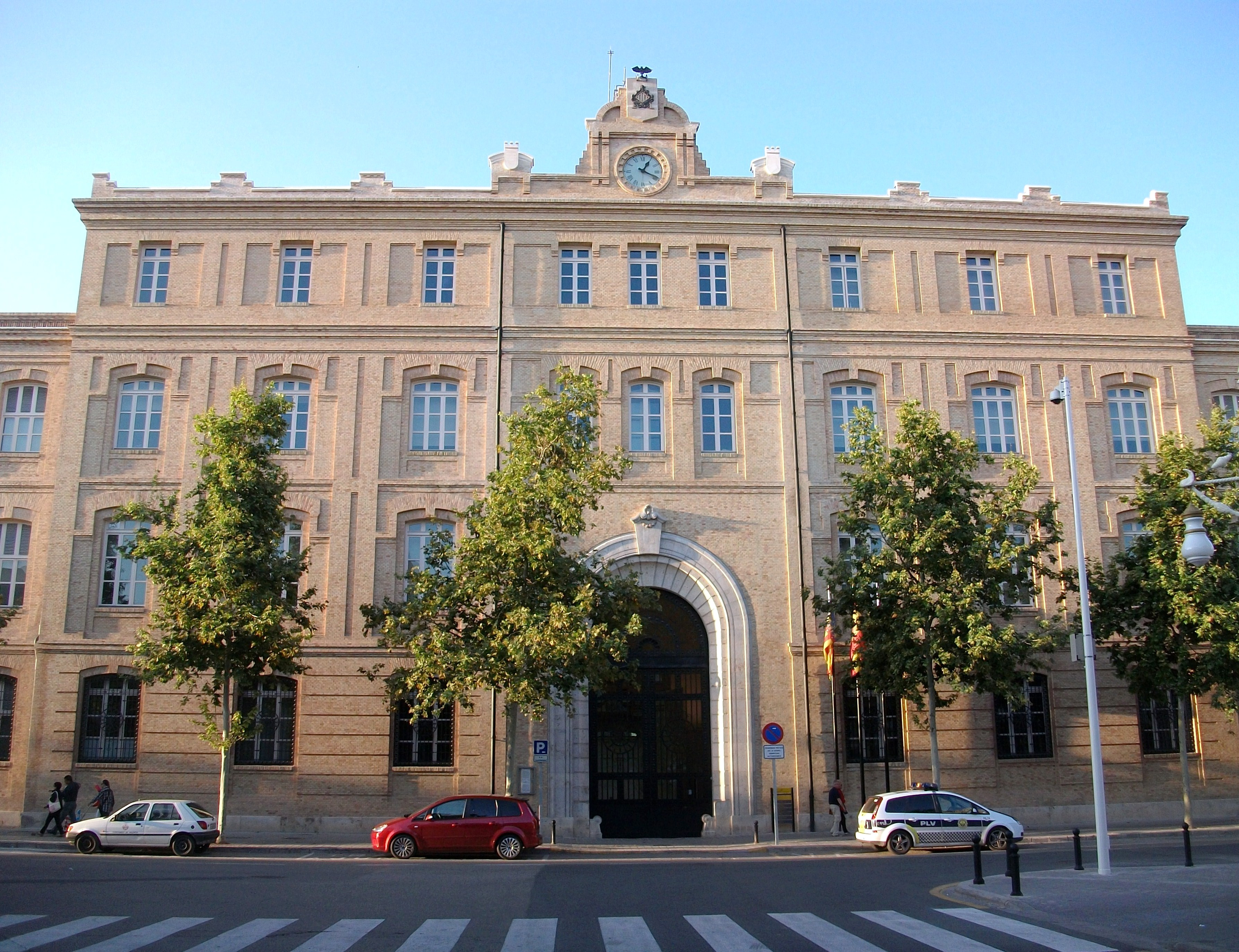
Tabacalera de València, previously the Palace of Industry

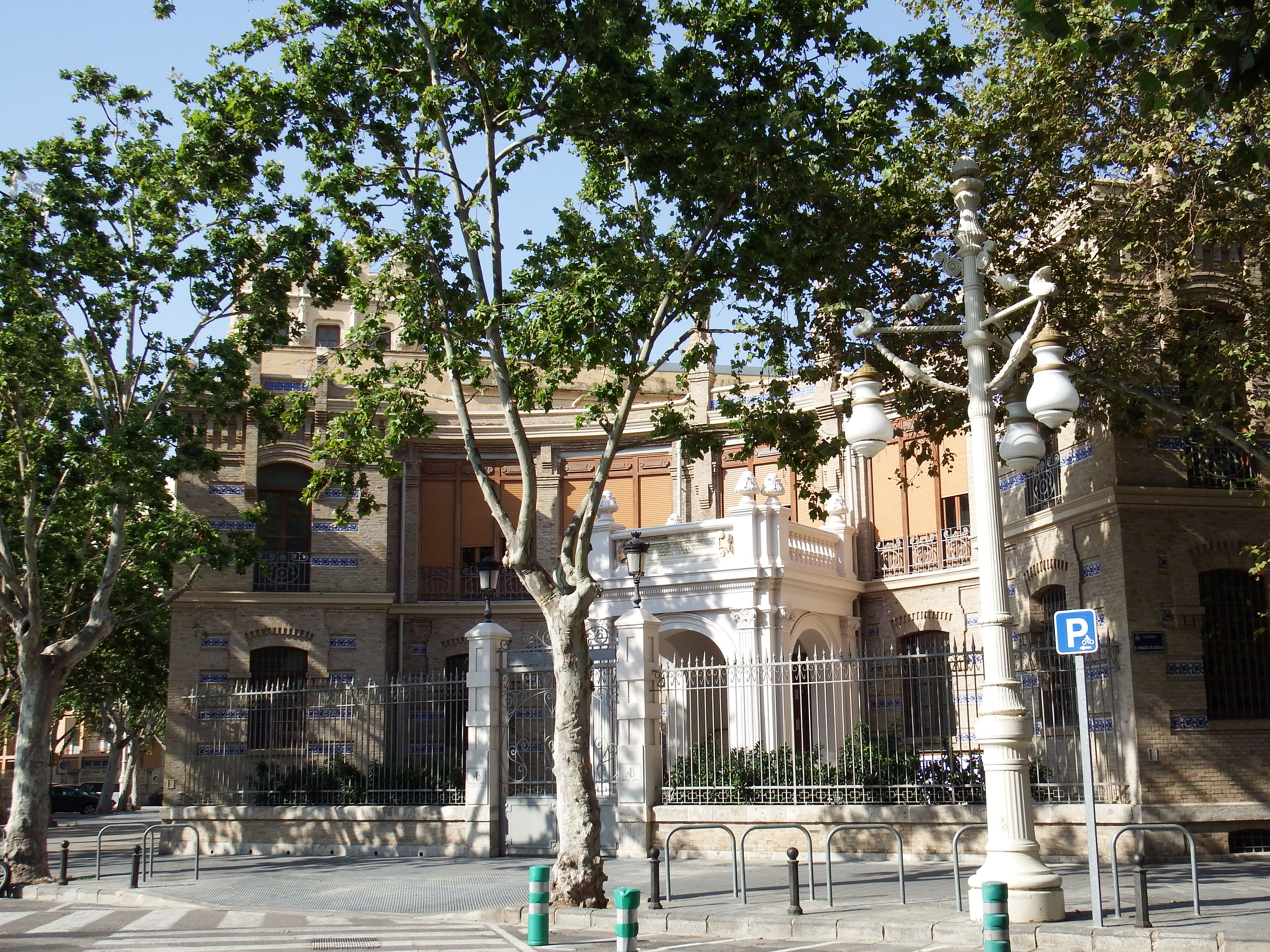
Alameda Spa, previously known as the nursing home

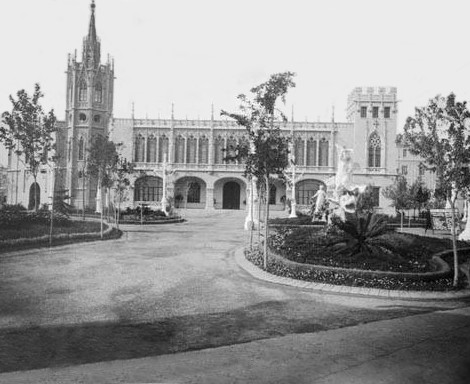
Municipal Palace
