= Modernisme Plaza of the City Hall of Valencia =

Coordinates: 39.4698°N 0.3764°W

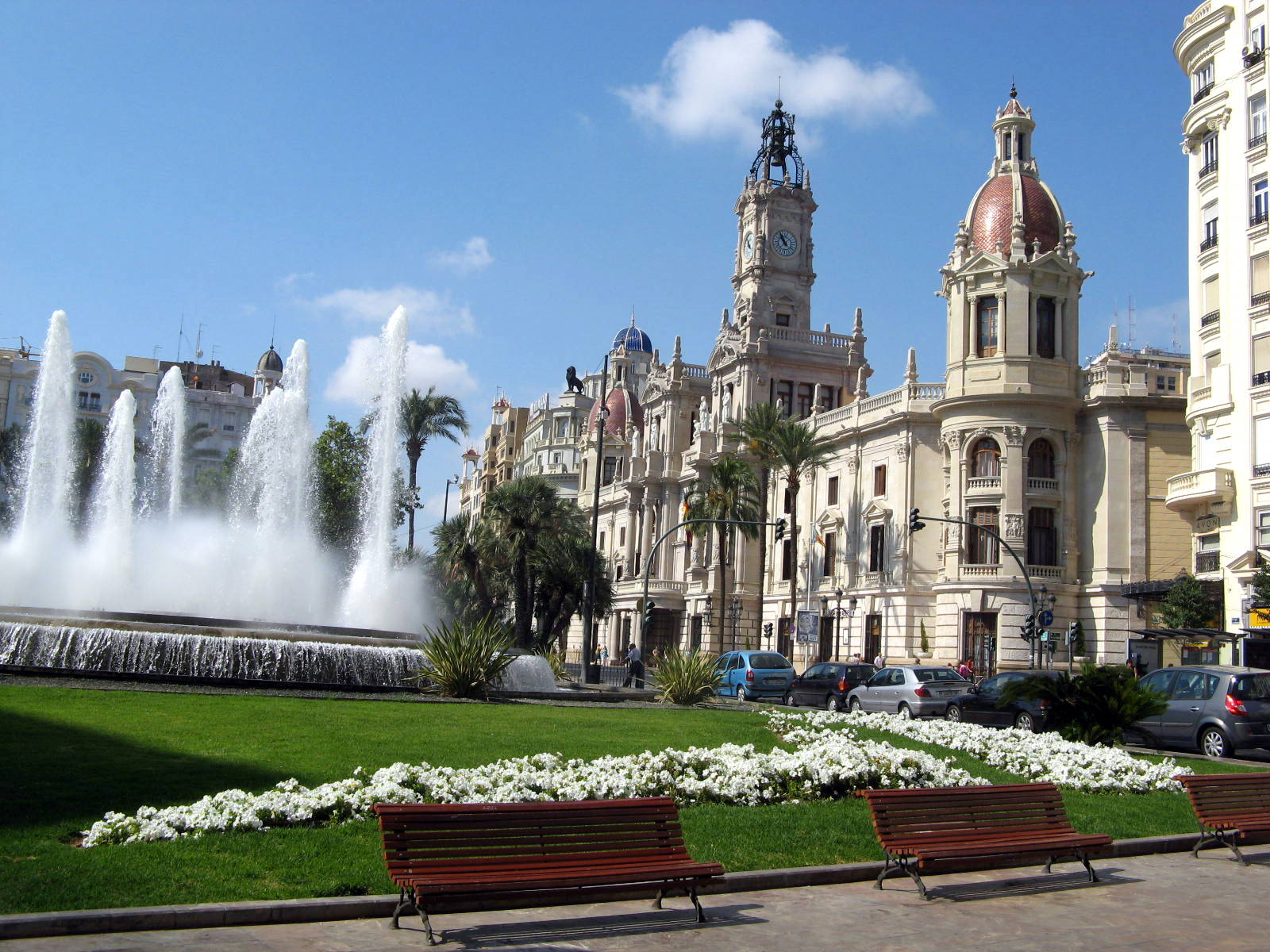
The plaza

The modernization of the Plaza de Emilio Castelar (now Plaza del Ayuntamiento) was designed by municipal architect Francisco Javier Goerlich from 1927, with the main reform carried out between 1931 and 1933. It later became the Plaza of the City Hall and its fountain.

Dr. Daniel Benito Goerlich, nephew of architect Francisco Javier Goerlich Lleó, Professor of Art History at the University of Valencia; he served as Conservator of the University's historical and artistic heritage from 1987 to 2018, stated that the 1930s reform "belongs to a very specific social context, and was destroyed a few years later in a completely different context, the repressive postwar, towards the 'disaffected' to the political regime of the time."

== History ==
The work of the Plaza del Ayuntamiento ended the previous "Bajada de San Francisco". Its expropriation caused expected unrest among the residents. The subsequent Plaza and Parque de Emilio Castelar is part of the architectural work of Goerlich Lleó including purist, Art Deco and Modernisme styles. This was destined to become the new civic center of the city, competing with the plazas de la Reina and de la Virgen. It was carried out using a high and triangular platform. The corners, culminated with fountains, representing the three provinces.

The square had the nickname tortada (caked), referring to the upper platform, and it mainly included two elements: the steps of classic style and Mercado de las Flores (Flower Market). The latter was an underground space that inserted into the square and allowed florists to sell their product. However, they were strongly opposed to be housed inside from the start. The space them was narrow and dark and, although it was a badge element to the square and the city, considered that supposed its "commercial ruin".

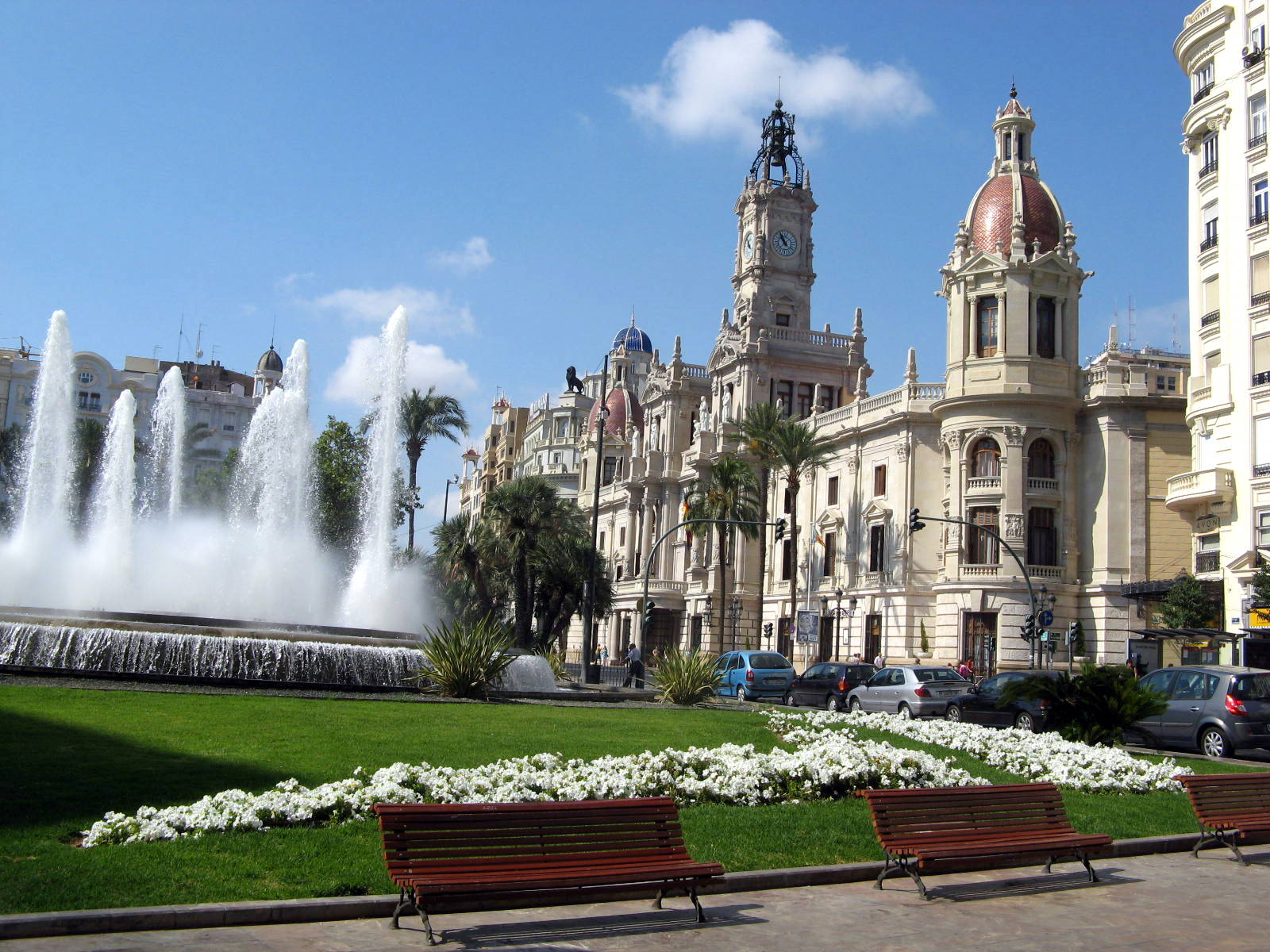
Plaza del Ayuntamiento de Valencia

=== Architect ===
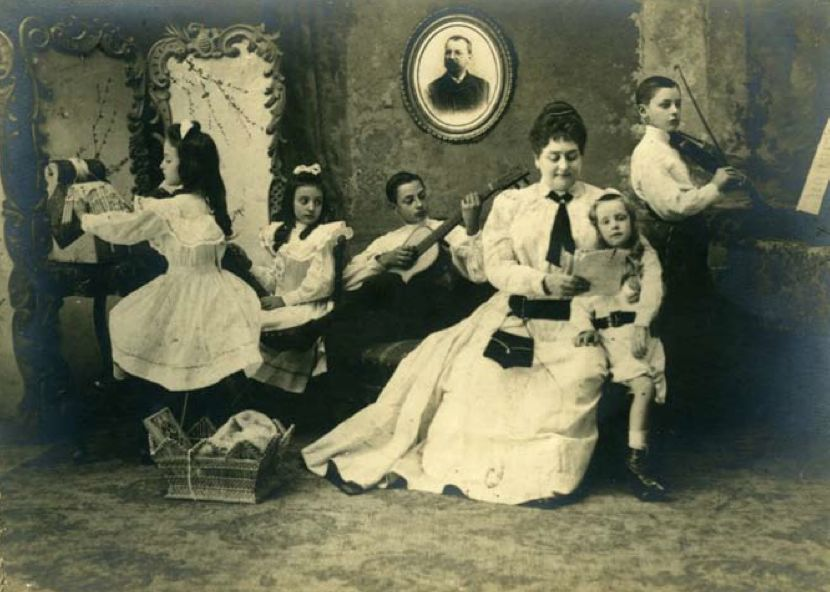
Photograph of Goerlich-Lleó family in which the young Javier Goerlich (architect that made the work) appears in the center, with guitar.

The architect was the son of the consul of the Austro-Hungarian Empire, Javier Goerlich Lleó. He signed buildings including the headquarters of Bank of Valencia, in addition to expanding streets and avenues including stand de la Paz, Poeta querol or Barón de Cárcer. Among other buildings, Goerlich Lleó replaced the old "Bajada de San Francisco" with this.

=== Destruction ===
After years of disputes with florists, they left in 1944. Just over a decade later the platform began to fall apart, losing its appearance at different levels and giving way to a flat space without baroque motifs. Shortly thereafter, the balcony of the City Hall was redesigned by Emilio Rieta and Román Jiménez to preside over military parades. The plaza was nondescript and specially designed to carry out acts of falles tradit Mies van der Roheions. It then could accommodate more people, host the mascletá and the falles of the City Hall.

In 1962, the square – then named Plaza del Caudillo, after Francisco Franco – lost the light fountain by Engineer Carlos Buigues and the equestrian statue of Franco, designed by Valencian sculptor José Capuz, which was relocated to the military base of Bétera.

The Plaza of the City Hall of Valencia hosts few symbolic values for much of the year, beyond the buildings that surround it.

== Criticism ==
The architecture shown by the "Goerlich reform" does not find favor among some Valencian architects. Rafael Rivera, municipal architect of Valencia during the 1980s and professor of urbanism at the School of Architecture of Valencia, considered the square to be a horror. "I read with surprise the comments on Facebook. People talk about the square with enthusiasm for the old, but not because it is something old of original form. In the 1930s Mies van der Rohe then was doing wonders for Europe and why the work only talks about the cultural poverty of the power and the bourgeoisie of that time in Valencia".

This same Rivera stresses that "there is a total absence of the flowers and it bury the posts, something that makes no sense. However, the subsequent result not I think not commendable because it is conditioned by a single use (referring to the Falles). the plaza of the City Hall is part of an axis completely abandoned by the Valencians between La Estacioneta (Pont de Fusta) and the Estación del Norte".

This architect points out that, in addition, "people should think it would have been difficult for a public expression as the 15-M movement if had occurred in the modernisme square. That versatility also makes it modern, but lacks of distinctive elements to adds a statue to Francesc Vinatea, a character of second order pointless for a square of that importance".
