= Maximiliano Thous Orts =

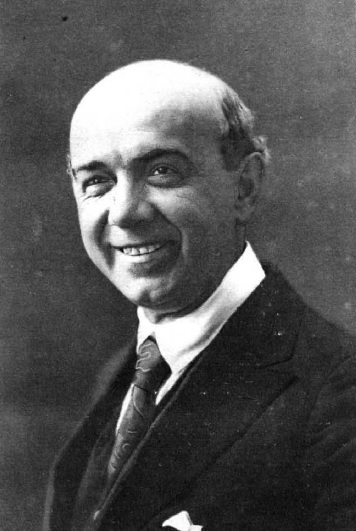
- Image taken in 1927
- Born: 1875
- Died: 1947 (aged 71–72)
- Occupations: Writer, songwriter, playwright, journalist, director
- Notable work: Himne de l'Exposició, (1909)

Maximiliano Thous Orts (1875 - 1947), also known as Maximilià Thous i Orts, was a Spanish journalist, writer, filmmaker, and playwright.

== Biography ==
Although he was born in Asturias, his family were from Alicante, but when he became older, they moved to Valencia. While at Valencia, he studied law at the University of Valencia, but he then quit studying to learn literature and writing.

In 1909, he wrote the lyrics to Himne de l'Exposició, which is officially the anthem of the Valencian Community.

In 1923, he began directing films.

During the 1930s, Maximiliano was a host of a radio program, named Radio Valencia Cadena SER. However, some of the recording were lost until 2017.

== Works ==
=== Filmography ===
- La alegría del batallón
- La Bruja
- La Dolores
- Nit d'albaes

=== Newspapers ===
- El Guante Blanco

== See also ==
- Spanish cinema
