= José García-Nieto =

Spanish soldier and footballer

Personal information
- Full name: José García-Nieto Romero
- Date of birth: 8 November 1915
- Place of birth: Madrid, Spain
- Date of death: 17 March 1998 (aged 82)
- Place of death: Librilla, Murcia, Spain
- Position: Defender

Senior career*
Years	Team	Apps	(Gls)
1930–1932	Alicante CF		
1932–1933	Hércules CF		
1934–1935	Atlético Madrid	1	(0)
1936–1937	Gimnástico FC		
1936–1937	Gimnàstic de Tarragona		
1939	FC Sète		
1939–1941	Levante UD		
1941–1943	Valencia CF		
1941–1942	→ FC Barcelona (loan)	9	(1)
1942–1943	→ CD Alcoyano (loan)		
1943–1944	Levante UD		

Managerial career
- 1948–1949: Melilla CF
- Club Maghreb el Akssa
- Algeciras CF
- Real Balompédica Linense
- * Club domestic league appearances and goals

José García-Nieto Romero, better known simply as Nieto (8 November 1915 – 17 March 1998), was a Spanish soldier and footballer who played as a defender for Atlético Madrid, Valencia CF, and FC Barcelona. He later worked as a manager.

== Early life ==
José García-Nieto was born on 8 November 1915 in Madrid, where he lived until he was 8 years old, when he moved to Alicante because of his father's work, who was a photographer. He began playing football as a child at the Salesianos school in Alicante.

== Playing career ==
In the 1930–31 season, the 15-year-old Nieto started playing in federated football with the Alicante CF in the Regional B Championship, in the following season he played in the Tercera División. He later played with Hércules CF, a team that he was forced to leave in 1934 when he was assigned to Madrid for military service, and while there, he joined the ranks of Atlético Madrid in the First Division, where he had very few chances as he only played three matches, including one in La Liga.

When the Spanish Civil War broke out in 1936, he remained loyal to the Spanish Second Republic and moved to Valencia, where he played for Levante. The abrupt stoppage of official competitions led the Catalan and Valencian federations to create a new tournament, the Mediterranean League, in which Levante finished in fifth, and Nieto then helped his side win the 1937 Copa de la España Libre, netting the winner against Valencia in the final (1–0). He then played for Gimnàstic de Tarragona before moving to Teruel in Aragon, where he participated in the Battle of the Ebro, the greatest battle, in terms of manpower, logistics and material ever fought on Spanish soil. In 1939, after the war was lost, Nieto crossed the French border and entered the Argelès-sur-Mer concentration camp where he managed to free himself thanks to the mediation of FC Sète, a French team that signed him to play in the First Division. When he returned to Spain, Levante was his first team, and he was received there as a hero for having scored that winner a few months before.

In Levante, Nieto formed a defensive partnership with Guillermo Villagrá. In 1941, he was signed by Valencia, but after playing several friendlies and being condemned to being substituted to Mundo, Epi, Amadeo, Vicente Asensi, and Guillermo Gorostiza, he left on loan to FC Barcelona, who requested him when his forward Mariano Martín was injured. At Barça, he scored once in 9 official league matches. After another loan to CD Alcoyano, his contract with Valencia ended and he finished his career at Levante in 1944, at the age of 29.

== Managerial career ==
Nieto had a brief career as a coach, first at Melilla CF in the late 1940s, then at Club Maghreb el Akssa in Tangier in the 1950s, and then in the Spanish Segunda División with Algeciras CF and Real Balompédica Linense. After this stage as a coach, he left football completely and began to work by competitive examination at Diario Pueblo.

== Death ==
García-Nieto died in Librilla on 17 March 1998, at the age of 83.

== Honours ==
Levante UD

Copa del Rey:

- Winners (1) 1937

== Bibliography ==
- Closa, Toni; Pablo, Josep; Salas, José Alberto; Mas, Jordi (2015). Gran diccionari de jugadors del Barça [Great dictionary of Barça players] (in Spanish). Barcelona: Editorial Base. ISBN 9788416166626.
