= Luis Colina (referee) =

Spanish football manager (1888–1956)

Personal information
- Full name: Luis Colina Álvarez
- Date of birth: 12 August 1888
- Place of birth: Madrid, Spain
- Date of death: 22 July 1956 (aged 67)
- Place of death: Valencia, Spain

Senior career*
Years	Team	Apps	(Gls)
1907–1909	RS Gimnástica		
1911–1914	Stadium de Pardiñas		
3rd president of the National Committee of Referees
In office 1924–1926
Preceded by	Carlos Dieste
Succeeded by	Antonio de Cárcer
- * Club domestic league appearances and goals

Luis Colina Álvarez (12 August 1888 – 22 July 1956) was a Spanish football referee and a one-match manager of the Spanish national team. He was also briefly at the helm of the Real Madrid CF team during the 1919–20 season and was the third president of the National Committee of Referees from 1924 to 1926.

== Sporting career ==
=== Athletic career ===
Colina began his career as an active athlete in athletics, a discipline in which he excelled as a distance runner and pole vaulter. He trained for his athletic exercises in the famous gym of the Sociedad Gimnástica, a multi-sport club that also had a football department, the sport to which he would end up dedicating his entire life.

In 1909, his military service took him to Badajoz, where in 1910 he enlisted in the ranks of the Sport Club of that city. After returning to the capital in 1911, he founded the Stadium de Pardiñas in the Madrid neighborhood where he was born, a club where he served first as a player and then as president. According to posting practice, he also performed regular coastal judge service.

=== National refereeing ===
In the Gimnástica football team, Colina played alongside the likes of Sócrates Quintana and José Manuel Kindelán, with the latter going on to found the College of Referees of the Center on 15 April 1914, the very first College of Referees. Shortly after hanging up his boots in the mid-1910s, he decided to become a referee. After passing his game management exam in Madrid in 1914, he received his qualification as a referee from the newly established Central College of Referees in Madrid.

Colina began his refereeing career in the regional championships of Madrid, which was organized by the Madrid Football Federation (FFM). At the suggestion of the FFM, the Spanish Football Federation (RFEF) employed him as a national referee in 1923. As such, in the 1923–24 season, Colina refereed one knockout match in the Prince of Asturias Cup, a quarterfinal between Valencia and Andalusia that ended in a 3–2 victory to the latter; and then another one in the 1924 Copa del Rey, the tie break of a quarterfinal clash between FC Barcelona and Sporting de Gijón, which ended in a 3–1 victory to the former. In the week leading up to the 1923 Copa del Rey final between Athletic Bilbao and CE Europa, several doubts arose about the referee since the first option was a Basque, so Julián Ruete proposed Colina of the College of Referees of the Center as a substitute, but in the end, Colina served as a line judge alongside Emilio Sampere.

His most important achievement as a referee was founding the National Association of Referees in 1922. Colina was the general secretary of the National Committee of Referees before replacing Carlos Dieste as the new president of the committee, a position that he held for two years until 1926, when he was replaced by Antonio de Cárcer. He retired from national refereeing in 1927, two years before the first national championship in 1929. In total, he oversaw 36 national matches: (1924–25).

=== International refereeing ===
Thanks to a recommendation of the Central College, the RFEF presented Colina as an international referee to FIFA, which registered him in 1924, thus becoming the first-ever Spanish international referee, ahead of the likes of Fernando Contreras and José Llovera. In total, he only oversaw two international meetings, the first of which at the 1924 Olympic Games in Paris. He was sent there alongside a younger partner, and due to the expectations of the age, Colina being already 35, his partner was named the number one referee. If he was not officiating, he was helping his partner, and in fact, in a second-round match between France and Latvia, Colina served as a linesman. Colina then refereed a round of 16 match between Egypt and Hungary at the Stade de Paris, which ended in a 3–0 victory to the former. In doing so, Colina became the first Spaniard to act as main referee in an international match.

Colina then had to wait nearly three years for his next and last international experience, a friendly match between Portugal and France in Lisbon, which ended in a 4–0 victory to the former. After this performance, he decided to end his refereeing career.

=== Managerial career ===
On 21 December 1924, together with José Rosich and Julián Olave, he co-managed the Spanish national team in a friendly match at home against Austria, which ended in a 2–1 victory thanks to goals from Antonio Juantegui and Josep Samitier.

== Later life ==
Shortly after abandoning his activity as a referee in 1927, Colina was hired by Facundo Pascual Quilis, the president of Valencia CF as general and technical secretary, a position in which he remained for 28 years, until shortly before his death. His experience was fundamental in the team's development, being present in the great historical events of the entity, such as promotion to the First Division in 1932 and runner-up in the Copa del Rey in 1934.

When the Spanish Civil War broke out, Colina was part of the club's board of directors, maintaining a predominantly sports line, above the harsh political events. Thus, in 1939, when football recomposed his order, he became a fundamental character in organizing one of the most brilliant stages in the history of Valencia. He created, from his position as technical secretary, the basis of a team that won the League three times: 1941–42, 1943–44 and 1946–47; They were runners-up three times: 1947–48, 1948–49, 1952–53; three-time champions of the Generalísimo Cup: 1941, 1949 and 1954, and four-time finalists: 1944, 1945, 1946 and 1952. Valencia also won the Copa Eva Duarte in 1949, after having been a finalist in 1948.

Upon his retirement, on 3 January 1954, Valencia paid him a tribute match against Rapid Vienna, in gratitude for his twenty-six continued years of dedication to the club.

== Death ==
Colina died in Valencia on 22 July 1956, at the age of 67.
