= Bertolí =

Spanish footballer

Personal information
- Full name: Inocencio Bertolín Izquierdo
- Date of birth: 21 July 1911
- Place of birth: Pina de Montalgrao, Spain
- Date of death: 13 August 1948 (aged 37)
- Place of death: Segorbe, Spain
- Position: Right winger

Senior career*
Years	Team	Apps	(Gls)
1933–1945	Valencia		

International career
1936	Spain	1	(0)
- * Club domestic league appearances and goals

Inocencio Bertolín Izquierdo (21 July 1911 – 13 August 1948), known as Bertolí, was a Spanish footballer who played as a right winger.

He began his career at UE Sants in Barcelona, but was signed without their consent by Levante FC and then taken by their city rivals Valencia CF. He spent most of his career at Valencia (1933–1945), despite spending the Spanish Civil War (1936–39) at Racing Ferrol while serving in the navy there. He played in the 1940 Copa del Generalísimo Final in which Valencia defeated RCD Español 3–1, as well as the 1945 final which they lost 3–2 to Athletic Bilbao.

He made his only international appearance for Spain in a friendly in Barcelona on 23 February 1936, a 2–1 defeat to Germany.

Before his death in 1948, at the age of 36, he was due to become the new manager of Almería CF.

== Honours ==
- La Liga (2): 1941–42, 1943–44
- Copa del Rey (1): 1941
  - Runner-up (1): 1945
