= Mestalla Stadium =

Stadium at Valencia, Spain

Mestalla
- El Templo (The Temple)
- UEFA
- Interactive map of Mestalla
- Former names: Campo de Mestalla (1923–1969); Estadio Luis Casanova (1969–1994)
- Location: Avenida Suecia, s/n 46010 - Valencia
- Coordinates: 39°28′29″N 0°21′30″W
- Capacity: 49,430
- Surface: grass/sand
- Field size: 105 m × 68 m (344 ft × 223 ft)
- Public transit: Aragó (Lines 5 and 7)

Construction
- Groundbreaking: 1923
- Opened: 20 May 1923; 103 years ago
- Renovated: 2005–2019
- Expanded: 2007
- Cost: 316,439.20 pts (Purchase of Land)
- Architect: Francisco Almenar Quinzá

Tenants
- Valencia (1923–2027); Spain national football team (selected matches)

Website
- valenciacf.com/mestalla

Mestalla Stadium (Spanish: Estadio de Mestalla [esˈtaðjo ðe mesˈtaʎa], Valencian: Estadi de Mestalla [esˈtaði ðe mesˈtaʎa]) is a football stadium in Valencia, Spain. The stadium is the home of Valencia CF and has a capacity of 49,430 seats, making it the 8th-largest stadium in Spain, and the largest in the Valencian Community. Since January 2020, it has been the oldest stadium in La Liga. Opened on 20 May 1923, the stadium's name originates from the historic irrigation canal of Mestalla, which was developed and consolidated during the Moorish dynasty between the 10th and 11th centuries, and was originally outside the south stand of the stadium where it had to be jumped over in order to get to the ground.

Mestalla is considered one of the steepest stadiums in the world and is commonly recognized as the steepest in Europe. This characteristic places it above stadiums such as the San Siro (Milan), La Bombonera and Monumental (Buenos Aires), Maracanã (Rio de Janeiro), Signal Iduna Park (Dortmund), and Stamford Bridge (London). The highest tier reaches an incline of approximately 34–35 degrees, very close to the legal safety limit established by FIFA and UEFA (37°). The proximity of the spectators to the pitch also distinguishes it, as few stadiums offer such a close-up feeling.

The Mestalla is a UEFA category four stadium. From its early years, the stadium has hosted matches of great international importance. In 1982, it hosted matches of the final stage of the FIFA World Cup in Spain, for which it was one of the seventeen venues. Subsequently, it hosted five matches of the Spanish Olympic Team during the 1992 Olympic Games. In 2025, it hosted the second leg of the UEFA Nations League quarter-finals. It has been the venue for ten Copa del Rey finals.

== History ==
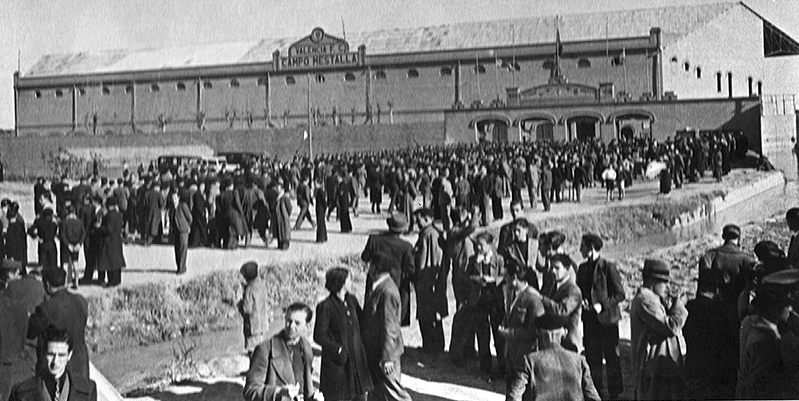
Inauguration day, 20 May 1923

The Estadio Mestalla was inaugurated with a friendly match on 20 May 1923 between Valencia and Levante. The new stadium had a capacity of 17,000 spectators, which was increased to 25,000 four years later. During the Civil War, the Mestalla was used as a concentration camp and storage warehouse. It would only keep its structure, since the rest was an empty plot of land with no terraces and a grandstand damaged during the war.

During the 1950s, the Mestalla was renovated, resulting in a stadium with a seating capacity of 60,000 spectators. It was severely damaged by the flood of October 1957 when the Turia River broke its banks. The stadium soon returned to operational use with some more improvements, such as the addition of artificial lighting, and was inaugurated during the 1959 Fallas festivities.

In 1969, the stadium's name was changed to Estadio Luis Casanova, to honour club president Luis Casanova Giner. The change lasted for a quarter of a century, when Casanova admitted that he was completely overwhelmed by such an honour and requested in 1994 that the stadium's name be returned to the Mestalla.

1972 saw the inauguration of the club's head office, located in the back of the numbered terraces. It consisted of an office designed in the avant-garde style with a trophy hall, which held the flag the club was founded on. The summer of 1973 ushered in another change at the Mestalla, the introduction of goal seats, which meant the elimination of fourteen rows of standing room terraces.

== Future ==
A replacement stadium, the Nou Mestalla, started construction in 2007, but is yet to be completed due to the club's financial crisis. The new stadium is due to have a capacity of 61,500. On 10 January 2025, construction for the new stadium has resumed and is estimated for completion prior to the 2027-28 season.

=== 2035 Rugby World Cup Bid ===
In October 2026, the Spanish Rugby Federation put forward a proposal to host the 2035 Rugby World Cup with the stadium in line host major fixtures at the tournament, should the bid be successful.

== Internationals and Cup Finals ==
The Mestalla held the Spain national football team for the first time in 1925. It was chosen the national team's group venue when Spain staged the 1982 World Cup, and at the 1992 Summer Olympics held in Barcelona, all of Spain's matches up to the final were held at the Mestalla, as they won Gold.

The Mestalla has been the setting for important international matches, has held nine cup finals, has also been a temporary home for Levante, home of the Spain national football team and exile for Castellón and Real Madrid in the European Cup. The Mestalla hosted four El Clásico finals in Copa del Rey between Barcelona and Real Madrid, with 1936, 1990, 2011 and 2014. In total, the stadium hosted ten Copa del Rey finals, with the first one played in 1926.

=== 1982 FIFA World Cup ===
The stadium was one of the venues of the 1982 FIFA World Cup (known as Luis Casanova Stadium at the time of the tournament), and held the following matches:

Date	Team #1	Res.	Team #2	Round	Attendance
1982-06-16	Spain	1–1	Honduras	Group 5 (first round)	49,562
1982-06-20	Spain	2–1	Yugoslavia	Group 5 (first round)	48,000
1982-06-25	Spain	0–1	Northern Ireland	Group 5 (first round)	49,562

== Transport ==
Metro:

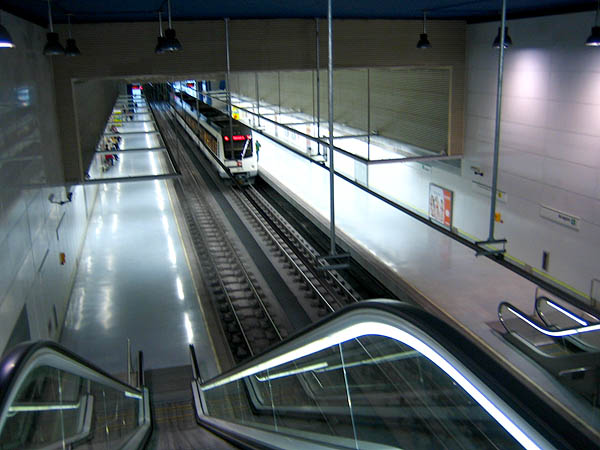
Aragó station (Line 5) Metrovalencia

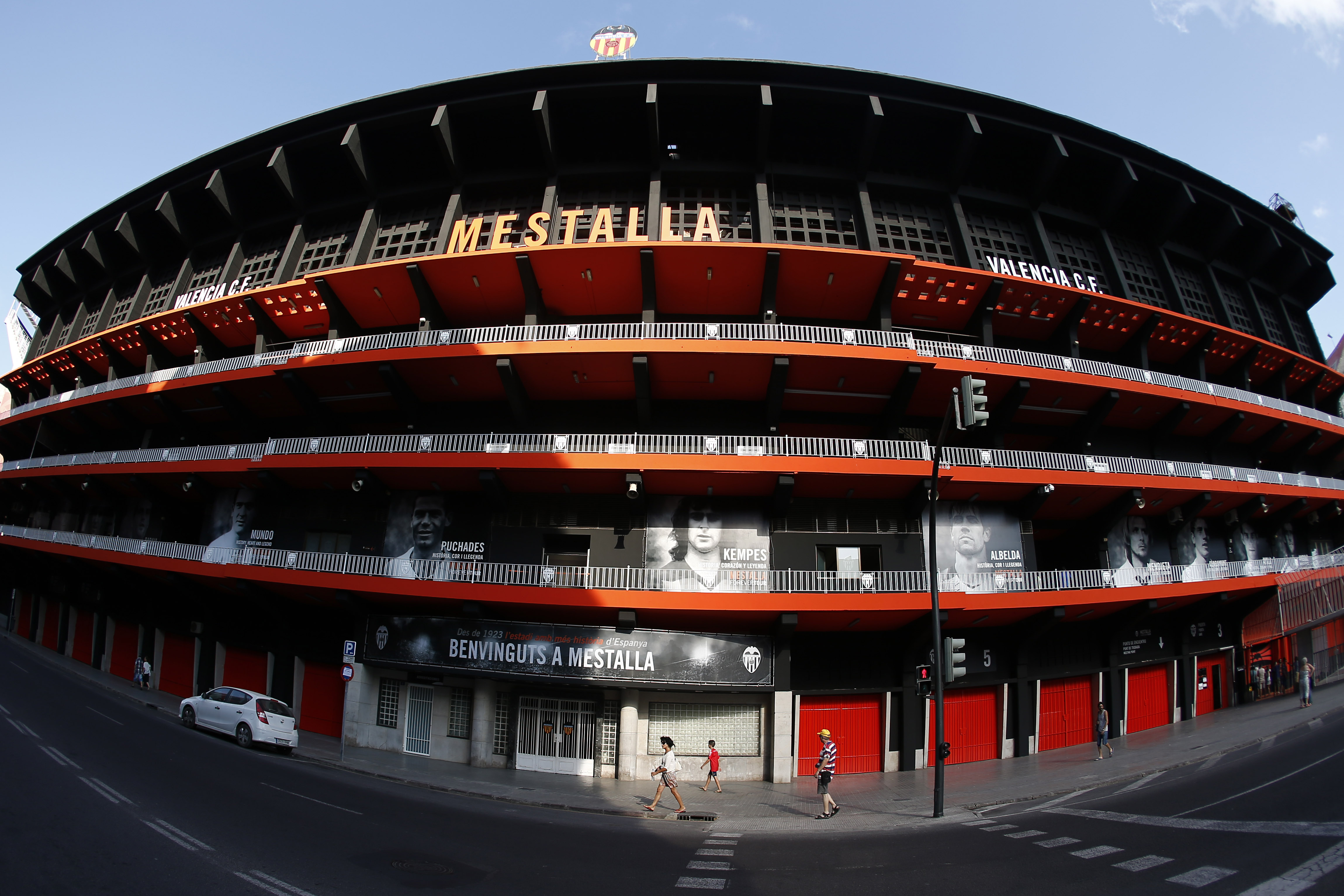
Exterior view

Aragó station (Lines 5 and 7) Metrovalencia

Facultats-Manuel Broseta station (Lines 3 and 9) Metrovalencia

Bus lines:

Amadeo of Savoia street in: line 32.

Reyes Prosper street: line 71.

Avenida de Aragón: lines 10, 12, 80, 41 and 79

Avenida Blasco Ibáñez: lines 10, 29, 30, 31, 71, 79, 81, 89 and 90.
