= 1934 Copa del Presidente de la República =

34th Copa del Rey

Tournament details
- Country: Spain
- Teams: 28

Final positions
- Champions: Madrid FC (6th title)
- Runners-up: Valencia FC

Tournament statistics
- Matches played: 57
- Goals scored: 214 (3.75 per match)

The Copa del Presidente de la República 1934 (President of the Republic's Cup) was the 34th staging of the Copa del Rey, the Spanish football cup competition.

The competition started on March 11 and concluded on May 6 with the final, held at the Montjuïc Stadium in Barcelona. Madrid won their 6th title.

== Teams ==
As in the previous tournaments, the teams qualified through the Regional Championships:

- Asturias Region (2): Oviedo FC, Sporting de Gijón
- Balearic Islands Region (1): CD Constancia
- Canary Islands Region (1): CD Tenerife
- Cantabria Region (1): Racing de Santander
- Catalonia Region (3): FC Barcelona, CD Español, CD Sabadell
- Galicia Region (3): Club Celta, Deportivo La Coruña, Racing Ferrol
- Gipuzkoa–Navarre–Aragon Region (4): Donostia FC, CD Logroño, CA Osasuna, Zaragoza FC
- Murcia Region (2): Murcia FC, Hércules FC
- Northern Africa Region (1): Ceuta Sport
- Center–South Region (4): Madrid FC, Athletic Madrid, Sevilla FC, Betis Balompié
- West Region (1): Club Recreativo Onuba
- Levante Region (2): Valencia FC, Levante FC
- Biscay Region (3): Athletic Bilbao, Baracaldo FC, Arenas Club

== Round of 32 ==
The first leg was played on March 11. The second leg was played on March 18.

Team 1	Agg.	Team 2	1st leg	2nd leg
CD Español	7–2	Racing Ferrol	7–1	0–1
CD Sabadell	3–3	Celta Vigo	2–1	1–2
Baracaldo FC	4–6	Sporting Gijón	2–3	2–3
CD Tenerife	4–6	Hércules FC	1–4	3–2
CA Osasuna	3–1	Athletic Madrid	2–0	1–1
Betis Balompié	3–1	Levante FC	2–1	1–0
CD Logroño	0–3	Murcia FC	0–0	0–3
Ceuta Sport	3–8	Sevilla FC	3–3	0–5
Valencia FC	9–7	Racing Santander	7–1	2–6
Zaragoza FC	1–1	Arenas Club	1–0	0–1
CD Constancia	0–3	FC Barcelona	0–1	0–2
Deportivo La Coruña	5–1	Recreativo Onuba	5–0	0–1

Athletic Bilbao, Madrid FC, Oviedo FC and Donostia FC received a bye.

- Tiebreaker

Team 1	Score	Team 2
Zaragoza FC	2–1	Arenas Club
Celta Vigo	4–2	CD Sabadell

== Round of 16 ==
The first leg was played on March 25. The second leg was played on April 1.

Team 1	Agg.	Team 2	1st leg	2nd leg
FC Barcelona	7–4	Sevilla FC	5–1	2–3
Oviedo FC	6–0	Donostia FC	4–0	2–0
CA Osasuna	1–8	Madrid FC	0–3	1–5
Deportivo La Coruña	0–3	Hércules FC	0–1	0–2
Club Celta	4–5	CD Español	3–2	1–3
Athletic Bilbao	10–2	Zaragoza FC	5–0	5–2
Murcia FC	3–9	Valencia FC	1–3	2–6
Betis Balompié	3–1	Sporting Gijón	3–0	0–1

== Quarter-finals ==
The first leg was played on April 8. The second leg was played on April 15.

Team 1	Agg.	Team 2	1st leg	2nd leg
FC Barcelona	3–4	Betis Balompié	1–2	2–2
Oviedo FC	8–7	CD Español	5–2	3–5
Hércules FC	2–4	Valencia FC	2–1	0–3
Athletic Bilbao	2–2	Madrid FC	1–1	1–1

- Tiebreaker

Team 1	Score	Team 2
Madrid FC	2–2	Athletic Bilbao
Madrid FC	3–0	Athletic Bilbao

== Semi-finals ==
The first leg was played on April 22. The second leg was played on April 29.

Team 1	Agg.	Team 2	1st leg	2nd leg
Betis Balompié	1–4	Madrid FC	0–2	1–2
Valencia FC	5–3	Oviedo FC	2–2	3–1

== Final ==
6 May 1934
16:45 CET

Madrid FC	2–1	Valencia FC
Hilario 71'; Lazcano 73'		Jose Vilanova 48'

Montjuïc, Barcelona
Attendance: 42,000
Referee: Agustín Vilalta

Copa del Rey 1934 Winners
Madrid FC
6th title

== Topscorers ==
Jose Vilanova 11 Goals
