= Bardin (surname) =

Bardin or Bardín is a French language surname. Notable people with the surname include:

- Ambroise-Marguerite Bardin (1768–1842), French artist
- Bernard Bardin (1934–2023), French politician
- Bianca Bardin (born 2000), Italian footballer
- David J. Bardin (born 1933), American government official
- Delphine Bardin (born 1974), French classical pianist
- Garri Bardin (born 1941), Russian animation director
- Ivan Bardin (1883–1960), Soviet metallurgist
- James Bardin Palmer (c. 1771–1833), Canadian politician
- Jean Bardin (1732–1809), French historical painter
- John Franklin Bardin (1916–1981), American writer
- Melissa Bardin Galsky (born 1972), American actress
- Nikolai Bardin (born 1976), Russian ice hockey winger
- Pierre Bardin (1590–1635), French mathematician and philosopher
- Renato Bardín, Spanish sports leader
- Théophile Bardín (1858-1940), Spanish businessman and diplomat
