= 1935–36 Hércules CF season =

Hércules
1935–36 season
- President: José Antonio Larrinaga
- Manager: Manuel Suárez
- Stadium: Bardín
- Primera División: 6th
- Copa del Rey: Semifinals
- Top goalscorer: League: Blázquez (13); All: Blázquez (17)
Home colours

The 1935–36 season was the 13th season in the existence of Hércules CF, the Spanish football team based in Alicante, in the autonomous community of Valencia. It was its first year in the Primera División.

== First-team squad ==
Note: Flags indicate national team as defined under FIFA eligibility rules; some limited exceptions apply. Players may hold more than one non-FIFA nationality.

No.	Pos.	Nation	Player
—	GK	ESP	José Pérez
—	GK	ESP	Juan Betancor
—	GK	ESP	Agramunt
—	DF	ESP	Manuel Macià
—	DF	ESP	Ignacio Goyeneche
—	DF	ESP	Ramón Orriols
—	DF	ESP	Francisco Medina
—	MF	ESP	Pascual Salas
—	MF	ESP	Manuel Rosalench
—	MF	ESP	Enrique Salvador
—	MF	ESP	José Tormo

No.	Pos.	Nation	Player
—	MF	ESP	Sinforiano Mújica
—	FW	ESP	Antonio Aparício
—	FW	ESP	Tatono
—	FW	ESP	Emilio Blázquez
—	FW	ESP	Ramón Mendizábal
—	FW	CRC	Alejandro Morera
—	FW	ESP	Ramón Irles
—	FW	ESP	Salvador Cervera
—	FW	ESP	Pérez II
—	FW	ESP	Pedro Gomila

== Transfers ==
=== In ===
Pos	Player	From
DF	(Spain) Goyeneche	(Spain) Donostia FC
MF	(Spain) Tormo	(Spain) Elche
MF	(Spain) Rosalench	(Spain) Júpiter
MF	(Spain) Salas	(Spain) Barcelona
FW	(Spain) Aparicio	(Spain) Levante
FW	(Costa Rica) Morera	(Spain) Barcelona

=== Out ===
Pos	Player	To
DF	(Spain) Salvador Surroca	(Spain) ?
MF	(Spain) Moro	(Spain) ?
MF	(Spain) Julián Cuenca	(Spain) ?
FW	(Spain) Roldán	(Spain) ?
FW	(Spain) Sosa	(Spain) ?
FW	(Spain) Déniz	(Spain) Victoria
FW	(Spain) Pocoví	(Spain) Mallorca

== Statistics ==
=== Appearances and goals ===
#	P	N	Name	GS	Liga	G	Cup	G
—	GK	(Spain)	José Pérez	17	17	0	7	0
—	GK	(Spain)	Juan Betancor	4	4	0	0	0
—	GK	(Spain)	Agramunt	1	1	0	0	0
—	DF	(Spain)	Manuel Macià	22	22	0	7	0
—	DF	(Spain)	Ignacio Goyeneche	14	14	0	4	0
—	DF	(Spain)	Ramón Orriols	8	8	0	2	0
—	DF	(Spain)	Francisco Medina	3	3	0	7	0
—	MF	(Spain)	Pascual Salas	20	20	0	7	1
—	MF	(Spain)	Manuel Rosalench	19	19	0	5	0
—	MF	(Spain)	Enrique Salvador	19	19	0	1	0
—	MF	(Spain)	José Tormo	7	7	0	5	1
—	MF	(Spain)	Sinforiano Mújica	4	4	0	0	0
—	FW	(Spain)	Antonio Aparício	19	19	5	5	0
—	FW	(Spain)	Tatono	17	17	5	7	2
—	FW	(Spain)	Emilio Blázquez	21	21	13	6	4
—	FW	(Spain)	Ramón Mendizábal	20	20	6	2	1
—	FW	(Costa Rica)	Alejandro Morera	18	18	7	4	1
—	FW	(Spain)	Ramón Irles	4	4	0	5	0
—	FW	(Spain)	Salvador Cervera	2	2	0	3	3
—	FW	(Spain)	Pérez II	2	2	1	0	0
—	FW	(Spain)	Pedro Gomila	1	1	0	0	0

Source: (for appearances) and (for La Liga goals and for Copa appearances and goals)

Key
# = Squad number
P = Playing position
N = Nation
GS = Game started in Liga
Liga = Number of games played in Liga
G = Number of goals scored in Liga
Cup = Number of games played in Copa del Rey
G = Number of goals scored in Copa del Rey

=== Starting XI ===
(These are the most used starting players in the most used formation throughout the complete season).

No.	Pos.	Nat.	Name	MS	Notes
—	GK	(Second Spanish Republic)	Pérez	17	
—	DF	(Second Spanish Republic)	Macià	22	
—	DF	(Second Spanish Republic)	Goyeneche	14	
—	MF	(Second Spanish Republic)	Rosalench	19	
—	MF	(Second Spanish Republic)	Salvador	19	
—	MF	(Second Spanish Republic)	Salas	20	
—	FW	(Second Spanish Republic)	Mendizábal	20	
—	FW	(Costa Rica)	Morera	18	
—	FW	(Second Spanish Republic)	Blázquez	21	
—	FW	(Second Spanish Republic)	Tatono	17	
—	FW	(Second Spanish Republic)	Aparício	19	

Last updated: 29 August 2010
Source: Squad stats and Start formations.
Only competitive matches.
Using the most used start formation.
Ordered by position on pitch (from back right to front left).

== Match results ==
Match won	Match drawn	Match lost

=== Primera División ===
Kick Off	Opponents	H / A	Result	Scorers (Hércules players)
1935-11-10	Real Madrid	H	0–1	
1935-11-17	Osasuna	A	3–0	
1935-11-24	Athletic	H	1–0	Tatono 52'
1935-12-1	Betis	A	1–1	Mendizábal
1935-12-8	Oviedo	A	5&–2	Aparício; Blázquez 43'
1935-12-15	Español	H	2–1	Morera 25'; Blázquez 40'
1935-12-22	Atlético Madrid	A	1–2	Tatono 11'; Morera 22'
1935-12-29	Valencia	H	2–0	Blázquez 20'; Aparício 26'
1936-1-5	Sevilla	A	1–2	Blázquez 16'; Mendizábal 42'
1936-1-12	Racing Santander	H	4–1	Mendizábal 14'; Blázquez 30', 64'; Morera 40'
1936-1-26	Barcelona	A	1–0	
1936-2-2	Real Madrid	A	5–1	Morera
1936-2-9	Osasuna	H	1–0	Tatono 40'
1936-3-19	Athletic	A	5–3	Pérez II; Mendizábal; Blázquez
1936-3-1	Betis	H	3–0	Blázquez 44'; Morera 75'; Aparício 83'
1936-3-8	Oviedo	H	1–0	Aparício
1936-3-15	Español	A	3–2	Blázquez 67'
1936-3-22	Atlético Madrid	H	2–1	Mendizábal; Aparício 37'
1936-3-29	Valencia	A	5–2	Tatono
1936-4-5	Sevilla	H	2–1	Morera 10'
1936-4-12	Racing de Santander	A	4–2	Mendizábal 52'; Blázquez 57'
1936-4-19	Barcelona	H	2–2	Blázquez 23', 38'

=== Copa del Rey ===
Round	Kick Off	Opponents	H / A	Result	Scorers (Hércules players)
R2 First Leg	1936-5-10	Sevilla	A	3–1	Mendizábal 62'
R2 Second Leg	1936-5-17	Sevilla	H	4–2	Tatono; Blázquez Morera
Tiebreaker	1936-5-19	Sevilla	Neutral	2–0	Blázquez 13'; Salas 80'
QF First Leg	1936-5-24	Zaragoza	A	1–1	Cervera 75'
QF Second Leg	1936-5-31	Zaragoza	H	3–0	Blázquez 6'; Tatono 70'; Tormo 73'
SF First Leg	1936-6-7	Madrid	A	7–0	
SF Second Leg	1936-6-14	Madrid	H	2–1	Cervera 20', 80'
