= Renato Bardín =

Spanish sports leader

4th president of Club Natación Alicante
- In office 1925 – 25 April 1927
- Preceded by: Pepe Agulló

President of Hércules CF
- In office 1944–1945
- Preceded by: José Abad
- Succeeded by: Miguel Alemany

Personal details
- Born: Renato Bardín Mas c. 1900; Alicante, Spain
- Died: Spain

Renato Bardín Mas was a Spanish sports leader who served as the president of Hércules CF between 1944 and 1945.

== Early life ==
Renato Bardín was born in Alicante, as the son of María del Rosario Mas and Théophile Bardín, a French businessman and promoter of the wine industry, who had settled in Alicante at the end of the 19th century due to its climate and the quality of its vineyards.

Bardín served as the honorary consul of France in Alicante for several years, replacing his father, with the work of both helping to strengthen ties between France and Spain.

== Sporting career ==
On 3 August 1919, Bardín, together with Casimiro de la Viña and Marcelo Agudo, was one of the founders of Club Natación Alicante, being subsequently elected as the first treasurer of the club, which soon became the best team in Alicante. He went on to become its president in 1925, but following a severe fine from the Valencian Football Federation, the club's board decided to dissolve the team on 25 April 1927, and its entire entourage, including Bardín, then joined Hércules, which thus became the new best team in the region.

His father made substantial financial investments to establish Hércules as a top-tier club, with many considering him a pivotal figure in the team's history, alongside its founder, Vicente Pastor Alfosea. Thanks to his father's influence, he was appointed as the club's treasurer, a position that he held for several years. When he was faced with the need for a larger football pitch, Bardín convinced his father to build said stadium on some land he owned located in the Benalúa ravine, next to the Army barrack (currently the Alipark neighborhood). Thus, on 18 September 1932, Estadio Bardín was inaugurated, with the ribbon of the opening ceremony being cut by the mayor of Alicante and then the 14-year-old Lolita Bardín, dressed in a Hercules shirt, who also took the honorary kick-off of the stadium's opening match, a friendly against the great Real Madrid.

During his time as treasurer, Hércules experienced one of the most successful periods in its history, winning back-to-back Tercera División titles in 1933 and 1934, achieving promotion to the Segunda División in 1934, which they won at the first time of asking (1934–35), thus not only securing a third league title in just 4 years, but also promotion to the Spanish top tier for the first time in its history. Hércules finished their debut La Liga season in sixth place. The highlight of the season was a 1–0 home victory over the eventual champions Athletic Bilbao, but their momentum was soon interrupted by the outbreak of the Spanish Civil War.

In 1944, Bardín replaced José Abad as the president of Hércules, a position that he held for just one year, until 1945, when he resigned, being replaced by Miguel Alemany. He left the club because he had grown tired of investing money and failing to achieve the success he desired, going on to have several disputes with the club in 1949.
