= António Aparício =

António Aparício or Antonio Aparicio may refer to:

- Antonio Aparicio (footballer, born 1913) (1913–?), Spanish footballer
- António Aparício (footballer, born 1958), Portuguese footballer

== See also ==
- Toni García (footballer, born 1976) (José Antonio García Aparicio), Spanish footballer
