= Atanasio Abellán =

Spanish footballer and manager

Personal information
- Full name: Atanasio Abellán Ibáñez
- Date of birth: October 1900 (age 125–126)
- Place of birth: Murcia, Spain

Senior career*
Years	Team	Apps	(Gls)
- Murcia FC

Managerial career
- 1920: Real Murcia
- * Club domestic league appearances and goals

Atanasio Abellán Ibáñez (October 1900 – unknown) was a Spanish footballer who played for Murcia FC in the late 1910s, and who later became the first-ever manager of Real Murcia in 1920.

== Early life and education ==
Born in 1900 in Murcia, Abellán attended the Alfonso X El Sabio Secondary Education Institute of Murcia from 1910 until 1916.

== Sporting career ==
Abellán began his football career at his hometown club Murcia Football Club, which was soon replaced by Levante Foot-ball Club in 1919, the forerunner of Real Murcia. He then briefly coached the team, leading the club in its first official match in 1920, which ended in a resounding 7–1 victory over Deportivo Albacetense in the Levante Championship, thus becoming the club's first-ever known manager, a position that he held until 1921, when he was replaced by Pedro Maldonado.

== Later life ==
From 1932 until 1937, Abellán worked as the interim deputy secretary of the Provincial Court of Murcia, a position that was renewed in February 1938. Having become the secretary of the Administration of Justice, he was later assigned to the Government Chamber of the Territorial Court of Valencia, where he stayed until his retirement in October 1970, aged 70.
