= Bardin =

Bardin may refer to:

- Bardin, Florida American city
- Bardin (surname)

== See also ==
- Brandeis-Bardin Institute American college
