= Manuel Macià =

Spanish footballer and manager

Personal information
- Full name: Manuel Macià Sempere
- Date of birth: 17 August 1913
- Place of birth: Santa Pola, Valencia, Spain
- Date of death: 28 February 1991 (aged 77)
- Place of death: Santa Pola, Spain
- Position: Defender

Youth career
- 1925–1927: Atlétic Santa Pola
- 1928–1930: Santa Pola

Senior career*
Years	Team	Apps	(Gls)
1930–1937	Hércules		
1938	Nice		
1939–1948	Hércules		

Managerial career
- 1943–1944: Hércules
- * Club domestic league appearances and goals

Manuel Macià Sempere, also known as Manolo Macià or Macià II (17 August 1913 – 28 February 1991), was a Spanish footballer who played as a defender for Hércules in the 1930s. After retiring, he briefly worked as the coach of Hércules.

== Playing career ==
=== Santa Pola ===
Manuel Macià was born in Santa Pola on 17 August 1913, and he began his football career at the youth ranks of his hometown club Atlétic Santa Pola in 1925, aged 12, before moving to Santa Pola CF, where he played as left-back alongside his older brother José, also known as Pepe, who was a left winger. Both teams from Santa Pola were not federated, and he only played youth competitions and friendly matches.

=== Becoming a professional ===
In 1930, the Macià brothers were scouted by the Herculana board, who decided to sign them both as amateurs, and to distinguish him from his older brother, Manolo was known as Maciá II. He made his official debut with Hercules in a match against Elche in the Second Division of the Murcia Regional Championship, which ended in a 3–1 loss. He soon became Hércules' starting center-back, both in the Regional and in the newly created Tercera División. On 18 September 1932, the Macià brothers played in the first-ever match at Hércules' newly-inaugurated field Estadio Bardín, a friendly against the great Real Madrid, which ended in a 0–2 loss. In the 1932–33 season, Macià helped his side win the Murcia regional championship, which was the first official title in the club's history.

It is said that he charged 125 pesetas for transportation and sports equipment, and therefore, it did not take him long to sign his first professional contract in 1933, the year in which he played his first match as a professional against Elche in the Murcian championship. In the 1934–35 season, Macià played a crucial role in helping Hércules achieve promotion to the Segunda División, which they won in their debut season, thus achieving promotion to the first division of Spanish football. At the end of the promotion season, Maciá suffered the first major injury of his career, which kept him out of action for 4 months, but he was able to recover in time to make his La Liga debut in matchday 1, which ended in a 0–1 loss to Madrid. Maciá was a starter throughout that campaign, in which Hércules surprised all of Spain by reaching sixth place in the league table and reaching the semifinals of the Copa de Rey in 1936, being knocked out by Madrid 8–2 on aggregate.

=== Civil War and aftermath ===
However, his career was halted by the outbreak of the Spanish Civil War in 1936, in which Macià enlisted in the army and fought on the Republican side. In the 1936–37 season, Hércules issued a total of sixteen trading cards and war stickers, including that of Macià. After the war, he was exiled to France, specifically in Nice, where he briefly played for the local club in 1938, then in Ligue 2, where he would surely have met Ricardo Zamora and Josep Samitier. After the war, Hércules wanted to bring him back, but Macià had some reservations about returning to Spain, fearing possible reprisals from the Franco regime. Although Hércules president Renato Bardín managed to arrange for his return to Spain, he was unable to avoid spending a period in the Irún concentration camp, where he was the 453rd prisoner. Bardin continued to apply pressure and managed to obtain the necessary phalanx endorsements, so on 23 June 1939, he was given a provisional permit to move to Alicante, and thus, on 2 July, he was already playing against Levante.

At the same time, he opened a boat lighting shop in Santa Pola. However, a false complaint from a neighbor accused him of burning the parish of Santa Pola before the war, and despite the lack of proof and evidence, his republican past was enough to imprison him in the Benalúa prison, and later in Elche. Once again Bardin had to intervene to at least get him a permit for the home games of Hércules, since he was not allowed to train or play in games outside Alicante. On 5 May 1940, he was called-up to the Spain national football team by coach Amadeo García to contest Castilla, and played as a substitute in the second half of the 2–1 win. He was never called up again by Spain due to his republican past.

=== Later years ===
Maciá remained an undisputed starter throughout the 1940s, becoming one of its most veteran players, and although he was unable to prevent Hércules from being relegated to the Second Division in 1942, he then helped his side achieve another promotion to the First Division in 1945, following a hard-fought 3–1 victory against Barakaldo. On 17 June 1945, Macià was the subject of a tribute match at the Bardín, in which Hércules defeated Real Madrid by a score of 2–1.

Maciá stayed a regular in the team until his final retirement on the ninth day of the 1947–48 season, aged 35. In total, he played 82 matches in four seasons in the First Division, and 305 official matches for Hércules, thus being the 5th most capped player in the club's history only behind Paco Peña (316), Paquito Escudero (342), José Juan (350), and Juan Baena (362). Despite playing over 300 matches, he only received a single red card, in a derby with Elche in 1942.

== Manegerial career ==
Throughout his career, Macià demonstrated a nobility and honesty that earned him the respect and admiration of those who knew him, hence why he was the team's captain and coach between the board and the team. Together with Blázquez and Cervera, he was in charge of the administrative direction of Hércules when the civil war broke out, in which the club was left lacking members and activity. In the 1943–44 season, he replaced Luis Urquiri as the club's coach, thus performing the functions of a player-coach for Hèrcules, overseeing a total of 26 matches and achieving a record of 9 wins, 4 draws, and 13 losses; he was replaced by Pagaza.

In 1949, Macià was named an Honorary Member of Hércules "in response to his efforts and sacrifices to always maintain the good name of our colors". And in fact, he remained linked to Hércules for almost 20 years despite having had higher offers from Real Madrid in 1933 or Barcelona in 1943, with the former offering Hércules' salary multiplied by five. Many agree that if he had signed for a bigger club, he would have been played internationally with the Spain national team.

== Later life and death ==
After his retirement he devoted himself to his maritime lighting business in his local town. In the 1950s, Macià returned to Santa Pola CF, where he worked as the head and coordinator of the local footballers, and under his encouragement and following his guidance, several popular players emerged, such as Pinocho and Antonio Pascual Bonmatí. In the 1980, Santa Pola CF opened their stadium, which they named Manolo Macià. Furthermore, a street in the city of Alicante has been named after him.

Macià died in Santa Pola on 28 February 1991, at the age of 77.

== Honours ==
Hércules CF Alicante

- Murcia Championship
  - Champions (1): 1931–32
- Segunda División
  - Champions (1): 1934–35
