= Campo de La Viña =

Football stadium in Alicante (1919–1974)

- Location: Alicante, Valencia, Spain
- Capacity: 5.000

Construction
- Opened: 30 January 1919
- Demolished: 1974

Tenants
- Club Natación Alicante (1919–1927) Hércules CF (1927–1932) Alicante CF (1932–1954) Hércules CF (1954–1974)

The Campo de La Viña was a football stadium in the city of Alicante, Spain, that existed between 1919 and 1974, and which served as the first home ground of Hércules CF between 1927 and 1932, and then again between 1954 and 1974.

== History ==
=== First steps ===
Inaugurated on 30 January 1919, Campo de La Florida became the home ground of Club Natación Alicante, founded by Casimiro de la Viña, being later renamed as Campo de La Viña in honour of its builder Prudencio de la Viña. Natación quickly became the most important football team in Alicante in the 1920s, and midway through that decade, they began sharing its field with its new subsidiary Hércules CF, who thus began to grow into prominence. Following an incident in a match against Valencia CF in February 1927, the Valencian Football Federation penalized Natación with a fine, but rather than taking it, the team was dissolved, and instead of forming a new club, the players of Natación joined Hércules, who in turn adopted their colours.

By the time Hércules appeared in the Tercera División for the 1928–29 season, the club was already contemplating turning La Viña, then a basic enclosed field, into a new stadium. In the late 1920s, Hércules began sharing it with Alicante CF; in March 1931, Casimiro de La Viña, owner of the playing field, realizing that they were going through financial problems and were almost unable to pay him the rent for the stadium, proposed the creation of a new club to represent the city, Club Deportivo Alicante, which would be the result or a merger between both sides, but this never came to fruition because the members of both clubs opposed it. Unable to pay the rent, Hércules moved to the purpose-built Estadio Bardín in 1932, which was located just 500 metres eastwards from La Viña, and whose construction had been mainly financed by Théophile Bardín.

=== Golden years ===
Following some problems with the Bardín family, Hércules decided to leave the stadium in 1954, returning to a renovated and expanded Campo de la Viña for the start of the 1954–55 season, while Alicante FC took the opposite route, from the La Florida neighbourhood to the Bardín stadium, which closed its doors in 1961, being then demolished in February 1963.

Unlike Bardin, La Viña did not have a covered stand, but it had a higher capacity and even resembled neighbouring Elche CF's Campo de Altabix. In its first season back to La Viña, Hércules finished unbeaten there, including against Alfredo Di Stefano's Real Madrid on 3 October 1954, in which the old La Viña ground proved to be too small, which resulted in a delay of half an hour and subsequently a fine of 2,500 pesetas by the Spanish Federation. La Viña served as the home of Hércules for the next 20 years, from 1954 until 1974, which included two seasons in the top flight in the mid-1950s, and a few more in the late 1960s. Throughout its history, La Viña hosted seven matches with Real Betis, with Hércules winning 3, drawing 2, and losing 2, with 8 goals scored and 5 conceded.

=== Decline and collapse ===
In the early 1970s, the Hércules president José Rico Pérez stroke a deal with the local council to sell the La Viña land and use the money to buy new land on the slopes of the Castillo de San Fernando to build a new stadium that carries his name. La Viña held its last match on 19 May 1974, in which Hércules defeated Córdoba FC 2–0 to earn promotion back to La Liga, a fitting farewell. La Viña was then demolished to make way for Estadio José Rico Pérez.

== Legacy ==
At the end of 2018, on the occasion of its construction, the Herculanos Association took the initiative to draw the lines of the field on the sand of the square of the same name as a tribute to the former Hércules stadium, which was finally completed four years latter, in August 2023, with the plaque next to the recreation of the field reading: "The old Florida stadium was located in this square".
