= Levante Championship =

Football competition in Spain

- Organising body: Valencian Football Federation
- Founded: 18 August 1918
- First season: 1918
- Folded: 1940
- Country: Spain
- Feeder to: Copa del Rey
- Last champions: Valencia (1939–40)
- Most championships: Valencia (4 titles)

The Campeonato Regional de Levante (Levante Championship) was an annual football competition for clubs based in the Valencian provinces, such as Levante, Castellón, Valencia, and Alicante, as well as those belonging to the Region of Murcia.

Between 1918 and 1924, the Levante Championship was divided in two: the North Section, which consisted of the clubs from the Valencian provinces, and the South Section, which consisted of the clubs from Murcia and Albacete, and the winners of both sides were then opposed in a two-legged final. It was organized by the Levante Football Federation until 1924, when the clubs from Murcia and Albacete left the entity to create the Murcia Football Federation, and as a result, the Levante federation had to be renamed to Valencia; these two entities went on to organize their own regional championship, doing so until 1934, when they came together again.

== 1918–19 Campeonato Regional de Levante ==
The Valencian group was won by Gimnástico, who defeated Castellón 1–0 in the final, while the Murcia group was won by Real Murcia; however, the result of the subsequent match between them remains unknown.

== 1919–20 Campeonato Regional de Levante ==
=== Final ===
12 March 1920 First leg	Aguileño	5–1	Gimnástico
		RSSSF; Bdfutbol

14 March 1920 Second leg	Gimnástico	0–3	Aguileño
		RSSSF; Bdfutbol

== 1920–21 Campeonato Regional de Levante ==
=== Final ===
20 March 1921 First leg	Castellón	0–1	Levante de Murcia
		RSSSF; Bdfutbol

27 March 1921 Second leg	Levante de Murcia	2–0	Castellón
		RSSSF; Bdfutbol

== 1921–22 Campeonato Regional de Levante ==
=== Final ===
26 February 1922 First leg	Levante de Murcia	2–0	España de Valencia
		RSSSF; Bdfutbol

1 March 1922 Second leg	España de Valencia	3–0	Levante de Murcia
		RSSSF; Bdfutbol

2 March 1922 Tie-breaker	España de Valencia	3–0	Levante de Murcia
		RSSSF; Bdfutbol

== 1922–23 Campeonato Regional de Levante ==
=== Final ===
18 February 1923 First leg	Valencia	3–0	Levante de Murcia	Campo de Algirós
	Cubells 31', 51'; Montes 78'	RSSSF; Bdfutbol		Referee: Ezequiel Montero

25 February 1923 Second leg	Levante de Murcia	1–1	Valencia	Campo de la Torre de la Marquesa
	Martínez 75'	RSSSF; Bdfutbol	Montes 50'	Referee: Ezequiel Montero

== 1923–24 Campeonato Regional de Levante ==
=== Final ===
3 February 1924 First leg	Natación Alicante	3–0	Gimnástico	Campo de La Viña
	Ramonzuelo 30'; Albaladejo 70'	RSSSF; Bdfutbol		Referee: Federico Larrañaga

10 February 1924 Second leg	Gimnástico	1–2	Natación Alicante
	Arróniz 10'	RSSSF; Bdfutbol	Ramonzuelo 20'; Devesa 60'	Referee: Antonio de Cárcer

== 1924–25 Campeonato Regional de Levante ==
=== Final ===
15 February 1923 First leg	Castellón	0–1	Valencia	Campo del Sequiol
	Reverter 60' (pen.)	RSSSF; Bdfutbol		Referee: Saracho Goitia

22 February 1925 Second leg	Valencia	1–0	Castellón	Mestalla Stadium
	Cubells 81' (pen.)	RSSSF; Bdfutbol		Referee: José Llovera

== 1934–35 Campeonato Supraregional Levante-Sur ==
Pos	Team	Pld	W	D	L	GF	GA	GD	Pts	Qualification
1	Levante (C)	10	6	0	4	24	19	+5	12	Qualified for the Copa del Rey.
2	Sevilla (Q)	10	6	0	4	26	23	+3	12	Qualified for the Copa del Rey.
3	Hércules	10	5	2	3	18	18	0	12	
4	Valencia	10	4	3	3	15	15	0	11	
5	Real Betis	10	4	1	5	19	14	+5	9	
6	Real Murcia	10	2	0	8	13	26	−13	4	

Source: RSSSF
Rules for classification: 1) points; 2) goal difference; 3) number of goals scored.
(C) Champions; (Q) Qualified for the phase indicated

== 1935–36 Campeonato Supraregional Levante ==
Pos	Team	Pld	W	D	L	GF	GA	GD	Pts	Qualification
1	Real Murcia (C)	10	7	0	3	27	26	+1	14	Qualified for the Copa del Rey.
2	Hércules (Q)	10	6	0	4	25	18	+7	12	Qualified for the Copa del Rey.
3	Valencia	10	6	0	4	24	16	+8	12	
4	Levante	10	5	0	5	32	18	+14	10	
5	Gimnástico	10	4	0	6	19	24	−5	8	
6	Elche	10	2	0	8	9	34	−25	4	

Source: RSSSF
Bdfutbol
Rules for classification: 1) points; 2) goal difference; 3) number of goals scored.
(C) Champions; (Q) Qualified for the phase indicated

== 1936–37 Campeonato Supraregional Levante ==
Pos	Team	Pld	W	D	L	GF	GA	GD	Pts	Qualification
1	Valencia (C)	9	6	1	2	28	16	+12	13	Qualified for the Copa del Rey.
2	Hércules (Q)	10	6	0	4	31	18	+13	12	Qualified for the Copa del Rey.
3	Real Murcia	10	6	0	4	26	23	+3	12	
4	Levante	8	3	1	4	15	21	−6	7	
5	Gimnástico	8	3	0	5	14	18	−4	6	
6	Cartagena	5	0	0	5	4	22	−18	0	

Source: RSSSF
Bdfutbol
Rules for classification: 1) points; 2) goal difference; 3) number of goals scored.
(C) Champions; (Q) Qualified for the phase indicated
- Although some were some games on standby (1 for Valencia, 2 for Levante and Gimnástico, and 5 for Cartagena), the championship ended early because Valencia had already won it mathematically.

== 1939–40 Campeonato Supraregional Levante ==
Pos	Team	Pld	W	D	L	GF	GA	GD	Pts	Qualification
1	Valencia (C)	10	9	0	1	38	9	+29	18	Qualified for the Copa del Rey.
2	Levante (Q)	10	6	1	3	22	15	+7	13	Qualified for the Copa del Rey.
3	Alzira	10	5	1	4	14	19	−5	11	
4	Castellón	10	4	0	6	18	22	−4	8	
5	Burjassot	10	2	2	6	17	20	−3	6	
6	Olímpic de Xàtiva	10	2	0	8	7	31	−24	4	

Source: RSSSF
Rules for classification: 1) points; 2) goal difference; 3) number of goals scored.
(C) Champions; (Q) Qualified for the phase indicated

== Results ==
Season	Champion	Copa del Rey (Note: Progress made in the Copa del Rey by qualifiers from the regional championship.)	Runner-up	Copa del Rey
1918–19	Contenders Gimnástico and Real Murcia (Unknown result)			N/A
1919–20	Aguileño (Sur)		Gimnástico (Centro)	N/A
1920–21	Levante de Murcia (Sur)	Quarterfinals	Castellón (Norte)	N/A
1921–22	España de Valencia	Quarterfinals	Levante de Murcia (Sur)	N/A
1922–23	Valencia	Quarterfinals	Real Murcia (Sur)	N/A
1923–24	Natación Alicante	Quarterfinals	Gimnástico (Centro)	N/A
1924–25	Valencia	Group stage	Castellón (Norte)	N/A
1925–34	No competition due to the breakup of the Levantine Federation			
Campeonato Supraregional Levante-Sur
1934–35	Levante FC	Semifinals	Sevilla	Winners
Campeonato Supraregional Levante
1935–36	Real Murcia	Round of 16	Hércules	Semifinals
1936–37	Valencia	Winners	Hércules	N/A
1937–39	No competition due to the Spanish Civil War			
1939–40	Valencia	Semifinals	Levante UD	First round

== List of winners ==
Club	Winners	Winning years	Runners-up	Runner-up years
Valencia	4	1922–23, 1924–25, 1936–37, 1939–40	–	
Real Murcia	2	1920–21, 1935–36	2	1921–22, 1922–23
Gimnástico	1	1918–19	2	1919–20, 1923–24
Levante	1	1934–35	1	1939–40
Aguileño	1	1919–20	–	
España de Valencia	1	1921–22	–	
Natación Alicante	1	1923–24	–	
Castellón	–		2	1920–21, 1924–25
Hércules	–		2	1935–36, 1936–37
Sevilla	–		1	1934–35

== See also ==
- Valencian Community autonomous football team
- Valencia CF
