= Théophile Bardín =

Spanish businessman and diplomat (1858-1940)

- Born: Théophile René Bardín Delille; 1858; Douai, Nord, France
- Died: 1940 (aged 81–82); Alicante, Spain
- Citizenship: Spanish
- Occupations: Businessman; Diplomat; Sportsperson
- Children: Renato Bardín

Théophile René Bardín Delille (1858 – May 1940) was a French businessman, diplomat, and promoter of the wine industry, football, and culture. He lived most of his life in Alicante, to which he made significant contributions, such as founding a college for Frenchman, serving as the city's honorary consul, financing renowned building, such as houses and the stadium of Hércules CF, the so-called Estadio Bardín, which played a crucial role in establishing Hércules as a top-tier club.

== Early and personal life ==
Théophile Bardín was born in 1858 in the Nord town of Douai, into a wealthy family, from whom he inherited a wine company located in the Loire Valley, which already had assets in Spain, the country to where he went in the mid-1880s, not only because he wanted to escape the Great French Wine Blight, a severe blight of the mid-19th century that destroyed many of the vineyards in France, but also because he wanted to expand his business. For this end, he initially invested in vineyards in La Rioja, but when he recognized the favorable climate and conditions in Alicante, he decided to relocate his thriving wine business to that region in the mid-1890s, acquiring some land in the Alicante orchard to grow grapes. He then joined forces with his fellow French wine producers in the city, Maisonnave and Dupuy, to guarantee their commercial steel.

Bardín married María del Rosario Mas, with whom he had at least one son, Renato, but after she died in 1913, he married again, this time to Dolores Alberola Gomis from Alicante, with whom he had a son Teófilo Bardín Alberola. Like so many other foreigners, Bardín had his name Castilianized, being known in Spain as Teófilo Bardín or even as René "Renato" Bardín.

== Life in Alicante ==
Bardín served as the honorary consul of France in Alicante for several years, until being replaced by his son, both of whom helped strengthen ties between his homeland and his adopted country. At the end of the 19th century, Alicante was the home to a vast French colony, so Bardín, who wanted to blend these two cultures that he loved, decided to create the Colegio Francés on Bailén Street, a center where the many French families of Alicante could receive high-quality bilingual education (Spanish and French), which would later evolve into the Lycée Français d'Alicante, opened in 1962. One of his grandsons, René Albert Bardín García, studied there.

In 1899, Bardín, who had been residing on Maisonnave Avenue since his arrival in Spain, commissioned the construction of Villa Marco in El Campello as a second residence for the summer holidays, with the works on the mansion being carried out at the same time as the creation of the Versailles-inspired gardens, which is currently a botanical garden with a significant heritage value; in fact, the whole mansion is now considered an artistic and architectural landmark, and stands as one of El Campello's most notable heritage sites.

Two years later, in 1901, he built his family home on San Fernando Street, an area highly appreciated by the Alicante bourgeoisie and notable French families, such as the Maisonnaves and the Dupuys, and in 1926, he built another house next door, which he used as rental housing; these buildings are now known as Casa Bardín and segunda Casa Bardín, and they were designed by the architects Enrique Sánchez Sedeño and Juan Vidal Ramos, respectively. Due to his desire to spread culture and art, his house quickly became a meeting place for writers and artists, such as Antoine de Saint-Exupéry, the author of "The Little Prince", and the pianist Gonzalo Soriano.

In addition to Alicante, he also had properties in Murcia and León.

== Sporting career ==
In 1914, Bardín was one of the co-founders of Hércules CF, making substantial financial investments to establish Hércules as a top-tier club, with many considering him a pivotal figure in the team's history, alongside its founder, Vicente Pastor. Thanks to his influence within the club, his son was named the club's treasurer, so when he was faced with the need for a larger football pitch, convinced his father to build said stadium on some land he owned located in the Benalúa ravine, next to the Army barrack (currently the Alipark neighborhood).

Thus, on 18 September 1932, Estadio Bardín was inaugurated, with the ribbon of the opening ceremony being cut by the mayor of Alicante and then the 14-year-old Lolita Bardín, dressed in a Hercules shirt, who also took the honorary kick-off of the stadium's first-ever match, a friendly against the great Real Madrid. In the opening ceremony, the Hércules vice-secretary thanked Bardín over the loudspeaker, describing him as the "alma mater" of the club and stating that "the magnificent field that Alicante now has is due to the splendor and selflessness of Don Renato Bardín Delille, who wanted to demonstrate with his actions his love for our city and for sport".

In addition to Hércules, Bardín was also a member and vice-president of Club de Regatas de Alicante, investing significant sums in its development because he was aware that Alicante, a city open to the sea, required a nautical sports club of prestige. In 1911, Alicante and the Regatta Club was visited by the King Alfonso XIII, who was honored with a Night Ball in the main hall, which was opened by the monarch and Charo Mas, the first wife of Bardín, who was also present.

== Death and legacy ==
Bardín died in Alicante in May 1940, at the age of 82. In February 2024, the basement of the Alicante Provincial Council held an exhibition titled "René Bardin, Alicante's historical footprint", which showed 39 previously unpublished photographs from the family collection, most of which having been taken by Bardin himself.
