= Club Natación Alicante =

Football club in Spain active between 1919 and 1927

- Founded: 3 August 1919
- Dissolved: 25 April 1927
- Ground: Campo de La Viña
- League: Levante Championship
Home colours

The Club Natación Alicante was a football team based in Alicante, Spain, which existed from 1919 until its dissolution in 1927, after which its players joined Hércules CF, who adopted their colours and quickly became the best team in the region.

Despite its ephemeral life, Natación was one of the most important clubs in the history of football in Alicante, winning one Levante Championship in 1924, and being the first Alicante team to compete in the Copa del Rey in 1924.

== History ==
=== Origins ===
Like so many other cities that are open to the sea, Alicante became the home to several swimming clubs in the early 20th century, most notably Real Club de Regatas, which provided its facilities next to the port, and Club Natación Alicante, which had its headquarters in the Baños de la Alianza. The latter was founded in the halls of the Círculo de Bellas Artes on 3 August 1919, mainly thanks to the financial support of the swimmer and sportsman Casimiro de la Viña. The club's board was subsequently elected, with Marcelo Agudo as president, Viña as vice-president, Enrique Picó as secretary, and the French patron Renato Bardín as treasuer. The club soon began to host other disciplines, such as football, which was played at the newly established Campo de la Florida, being later renamed as Campo de La Viña in honour of its owner Prudencio de la Viña.

=== Early success ===
Natación, captained by La Viña, played its first official match against Cartagena FC in Cartagena, losing 2–0, while their first match in Alicante was against the same team, winning 2–1. After the organisational disaster of the 1919–20 Levante Championship, which was declared void (without a winner), Natación was disqualified from the 1920–21 edition due to an altercation between the La Florida fans in a match against Real Murcia (then known as Levante de Murcia). As a result, the club left the Levante federation, but ended up returning two years later, in 1922, being knocked out in the semifinals by Real Murcia. In May 1922, Natación won a local championship that also included Sporting FC, Hércules, and Benalúa. The matches at La Florida quickly became great social events, with Natación becoming the first club in Alicante to reach 1,000 members.

In 1923, Tomás Tato, president of the Tobacco Factory, replaced Agudo as the club's new president, and he invested in signing the best players in the province, forming a great team that included the likes of Ramonzuelo, Manuel Blau, and José Torregrosa from Alicante CF, José Samper from Elche CF, and even the legendary goalkeeper Ricardo Zamora played two friendly matches for Natación in 1923, both against Racing de Madrid. The club also played two friendlies against Real Betis in May 1923, which ended in draws; the local press stated that "the best Natación players were Torregrosa, followed by La Viña, Candela, Más, and Ramozuelo".

=== Golden years ===
During these years, Natación developed a rivalry with fellow Alicante-based Círculo de Bellas Artes, which was also reflected in the press, given that Viña and the Natación director Pepe Agulló were editors of the local newspaper El Luchador, while the president and founder of Bellas Artes, Emilio Costa, was director of Diario de Alicante, so each newspaper took the side of a team; however, Bellas Artes end up disappearing in 1923. Natación thus became the most important football team in Alicante in the 1920s, and midway through that decade, they began sharing its field with its new subsidiary Hércules CF.

The club went on to claim the 1923–24 Levante Championship after defeating Gimnástico in the final 4–1 on aggregate, thus becoming the first sports team from Alicante to win an official federation title. This triumph qualified the club for the 1924 Copa del Rey, thus becoming the first Alicante team to compete in the Copa del Rey, where they faced Real Madrid in the quarter-finals, losing 4–0 away and 2–3 at home. After such a successful season, Pepe Agulló, who had replaced Tato as the club's new president, wanted to increase the team's popularity beyond its own city, so he not only organized a 2-month national and international tour for the summer, but also secured the loan of several renowned players from across the country, such as Josep Samitier, Luis Pasarín, Félix Pérez, Manolo Suárez, Balbino Clemente, who all played for Natación in the Canary Islands, Oran, Algiers, Gibraltar, and several regions in Andalusia.

=== Decline and collapse ===
In the following edition of the Levante Championship, Natación was knocked out in the semifinals by Castellón, and in the 1925–26 edition, both Natación and SC Castalia were disqualified. In an away match against Castellón, the score was tied at 0 when the referee awarded a controversial penalty kick to the home team, which was missed, but the referee awarded another one, which caused the Natación players to leave the field in protest.

The Valencian Football Federation penalized Natación with such a severe sanction and fine that the club's board decided to dissolve the team on 25 April 1927. Instead of forming a new club, the Natación entourage joined Hércules, who thus welcomed not only its players, youth academy, and directors, such as Renato Bardín (who later became their president), but also its fanbase, then the biggest in Alicante; in turn, Hércules adopted their colours: blue and white. Thanks to this leap in quality, Hércules became the best team in the region, a privileged position from which it never left.

== Notable players ==
- Casimiro de la Viña
- Ramonzuelo
- José Torregrosa
- José Samper
- Manuel Blau

== Presidents ==
Dates	Name
3 August 1919 – 1923	(Spain) Marcelo Agudo
1923–1924	(Spain) Tomás Tato
1924–1925	(Spain) Pepe Agulló
1925–25 April 1927	(Spain) Renato Bardín

== Honours ==
- Levante Championship
  - Champion (1): 1924
