= Manolo Jiménez (footballer, born 1960) =

Spanish football manager (born 1960)

Personal information
- Full name: Manuel Jiménez González
- Date of birth: 12 September 1960 (age 66)
- Place of birth: Madrigalejo, Spain

Managerial career
- Years: Team
- 1984–1985: Benidorm (youth)
- 1986–1987: La Nucía
- 1987–1988: Calpe CF
- 1988–1991: Benidorm (youth)
- 1991–1994: Benidorm
- 1995–1996: Hércules
- 1996: Albacete
- 1997–1998: Real Jaén
- 1999–2000: Hércules
- 2000–2001: Benidorm
- 2002: Real Jaén
- 2003–2004: Figueres
- 2007: Benidorm
- 2008: Alicante
- 2010: Jove Español
- 2011–: Valencian Community

Manuel "Manolo" Jiménez González (born 12 September 1960) is a Spanish football manager.

== Career ==
Jimenez was born in Madrigalejo, but raised in Benidorm. He started in the Benidorm CD coaching youth football. His big break came in the Hércules CF. Got promoted to La Liga in 1995–96. Hércules did not renew for return to the top flight, and had two more chances in the second level with Albacete Balompié and Real Jaén CF. In Albacete was sacked at 5 league matches. At Real Jaén in 2 times down the third level. He also had a second time on Hércules CF and fell to third level. After the third level trained in Hércules, Benidorm and UE Figueres. In the 2008–09 season was the sports director of Alicante CF and arrived several days to train the team in the second level, being sacked because of disagreements with the policy. He is currently the coach of the Valencian Community on UEFA Regions' Cup.
