= Humberto Núñez =

Paraguayan footballer and manager (born 1945)

Humberto
Personal information
- Full name: Humberto de la Cruz Núñez Cubillas
- Date of birth: 3 May 1945
- Place of birth: Asunción, Paraguay
- Date of death: 23 July 2004 (aged 59)
- Place of death: Orihuela, Spain
- Height: 1.89 m (6 ft 2 1/2 in)
- Position: Goalkeeper

Youth career
- 1957–1960: River Plate (Asunción)

Senior career*
Years	Team	Apps	(Gls)
1957–1965	River Plate (Asunción)		
1965–1966	Rubio Ñu		
1966–1967	Sol de América		
1967–1969	Club Olimpia		
1969–1978	Hércules	81	(0)
1975–1976	→ CD Málaga (loan)	24	(0)

International career
1967	Paraguay	4	
- * Club domestic league appearances and goals

Humberto de la Cruz Núñez Cubillas (3 May 1945 - 23 July 2004) was a former Paraguayan football goalkeeper and manager.

== Football career ==
Nene Núñez came to Spain through the Hércules CF. He kept goal for Hércules for ten years, one of them loan to CD Málaga. He helped Hércules win two promotions from the Third Division to Second and Second to the First Division.

Núñez spent one season on loan at CD Málaga, where he was well known for his towering size and punched clearances.

After his retirement as a player, he became the "house coach". He was placed on the lower grades, director of football, the second first-team coach, and was mainly devoted to training of first-team goalkeepers. On several occasions he was caretaker manager first team.

Humberto died after a heart attack in his sleep while he was napping in his hotel room where the Hércules was preparing the pre-season in July 2004. In Alicante, he was considered a very dear person, having worked for the Hércules for 35 years and died while serving the club.
