= Vicente Pastor (footballer) =

Spanish pharmacist and sports leader

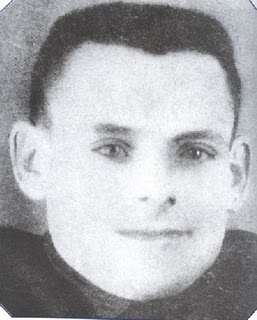
- Born: Vicente Pastor de la Llosa Alfosea; 1902; Alicante, Spain
- Died: 19 June 1939 (aged 36–37); Alicante, Spain
- Citizenship: Spanish
- Occupations: Pharmacist; Sportsperson
- Known for: Founder of Hércules CF

1st President of Hércules CF
- In office 1914–1921
- Succeeded by: Ángel Pérez

Vicente Pastor de la Llosa Alfosea, better known as El Chepa (1902 – 19 June 1939), was a Spanish pharmacist and sports leader who was the fundamental head behind the foundation of Hércules CF in 1914, serving the club as its first president from 1914 until 1921.

== Early life ==
Vicente Pastor Alfosea was born in 1902 in Alicante, as the youngest of five siblings from the marriage formed by Vicente Pastor Doméñez and Francisca Alfonsea, a humble family who ran a winery in Plaza del Carmen, right next to the Toledo Street, where they lived.

His father wanted him to inherit his grandfather's surname (de la Llosa), so he often wrote his full name as Vicente Pastor de la Llosa Alfosea, but in official records, his name appeared simply as Vicente Pastor Alfosea. The nickname El Chepa was due to a physical defect that he sustained at the age of 2, after a serious fall on the stairs of his house, becoming hunchbacked. His mother died when he was still a child, so he was raised by his maternal uncles on Sagasta Street.

== Sporting career ==
Pastor attended the recently inaugurated Salesian schools in the Ensanche of Alicante, where he used to watch Sporting, a team founded by Father Jaime Buch, play games of football, a sport that was just starting to gain popularity in the region. He soon developed a deep interest for this sport, which he began promotion among his group of friends, and despite his physichal defect, he was able to establish himself as the captain of this group; shortly after, in 1914, the 12-year-old Pastor decided to form his own football team with his friends, naming it Hércules FC, a reference to the legendary Greek hero Hercules, who was a strong and invincible man, two characteristics that Pastor wanted to see reproduced in his team. In its first years, Hércules played informal matches at the Plaza de la Reina Victoria (now Calvo Sotelo), and later he and his friends moved to the pavement of Paseo de Gómiz, using makeshift goals made of backpacks and rag balls.

Hércules gradually became more structured, winning a children's tournament in 1918, and forming a senior squad in 1919, and on 22 June of that year, the club played its first official match, against Athletic Club Benaluense at the Copa Excelsior, which Hércules won 2–1; they went on to win the tournament as well. Due to his physical issues, Pastor had to retire from playing, doing so before even turning 18 years old in 1920; however, he remained involved with the club, often serving as a referee, and also as the president, a position that he held for seven years, from 1914 until 1921, when he was replaced by Ángel Pérez. The club continued to grow in prominence and eventually became the subsidiary of the Natación Club, then the most important football team in Alicante.

On 18 September 1922, after several years of playing football in informal meetings, the 20-year-old Pastor and his friends decided to take a step further and formalize the situation by registering the club in the Levante Federation, a date that the club now recognizes as its official founding, with Pastor being named as a board member. Following the dissolution of Natación, Hércules adopted its current blue and white colours, and then established itself as the best team in Alicante, achieving its first great triumph on 1 June 1930, when it reached the final of the Spanish Amateur Championship.

In the mid-1930s, the club won back-to-back Tercera División titles, achieving promotion to the Segunda División in 1934, which they won at the first time of asking (1934–35), thus not only securing a third league title in just 4 years, but also promotion to the Spanish top tier for the first time in its history. At the end of the decisive match against Celta, players and fans lifted Vicente onto their shoulders and carried him around the club's stadium Estadio Bardín, inaugurated a few years earlier. Hércules then finished their debut season in La Liga in sixth place; the highlight of the season was a 1–0 home victory over the eventual champions Athletic Bilbao.

== Later life ==
Outside Hércules, Pastor worked as an assistant in a pharmacy at Plaza de Isabel II (now Gabriel Miró), and his responsibilities there increased during the Spanish Civil War, due to the urgent demand for medicine. Interestingly, his brother-in-law, a civil guard, had been assigned to execute José Antonio Primo de Rivera, but was unable to do so due to an intestinal illness that forced him to spend a few months off work, with Vicente himself providing the medical documentation that excused him from duty.

== Death and legacy ==
Shortly after the Civil War ended, Pastor died on 19 June 1939, at the age of 37, the victim of a stroke.

He has several recognitions in his hometown of Alicante, such as a street named after him, Deportista Vicente Pastor, and a plaque dedicated to him at the Estadio José Rico Pérez. In the club's 80th anniversary in 2002, Hércules held a commemorative event in the municipal cemetery of Alicante, where Pastor's grave was visited, and five years later, in 2007, the bonfire Armando Serra made a ninot of Vicente Pastor for the Benito Pérez Galdós Bonfire, at the Bonfires of San Juan in Alicante.

In October 2019, the Herculano Association published an illustrated children's book about the life of Pastor. In October 1922, on the 100th anniversary of Hércules, Luis S. Taza Hernández, the grandson-nephew of El Chepa, published a book titled "Breve historia de Vicente Pastor Alfosea".

== Honours ==
Hércules CF

- Copa Excelsior:
  - Champions (1): 1919
