= Ramón de Mendizábal =

Spanish footballer

Mendizábal
Personal information
- Full name: Ramón de Mendizábal Amezaga
- Date of birth: 5 November 1914
- Place of birth: Santurtzi, Spain
- Date of death: 11 February 1938 (aged 23)
- Place of death: Badajoz, Spain
- Position: Winger

Senior career*
Years	Team	Apps	(Gls)
1932–1933	Madrid	0	(0)
1933–1934	→ Hércules (loan)		
1934–1935	Atlético Madrid	2	(1)
1935–1936	Hércules	20	(5)
- * Club domestic league appearances and goals

Ramón de Mendizábal Amezaga (5 November 1914 – 11 February 1938), known as Mendizábal in his playing days, was a Spanish footballer who played as a right winger.

== Club career ==
He was a prominent player in the 1930s. In the 1933–34 season won promotion to the second level with Hércules CF. In the 1935–36 season was uncovered as much right wing player in Hércules, in the top flight. Mendizábal served with the Nationalists during the Spanish Civil War and died in a plane crash in 1938.
