= José Víctor Rodríguez =

Spanish football manager

Personal information
- Birth name: José Víctor Rodríguez de Miguel
- Date of birth: 10 February 1945
- Place of birth: Palencia, Castile and León, Spain
- Date of death: 3 March 2016 (aged 71)
- Place of death: Murcia, Spain

Managerial career
- Years: Team
- 1975–1977: Murcia
- 1977–1978: Cartagena
- 1978–1979: Albacete
- 1979–1981: Murcia
- 1981–1982: Oviedo
- 1982–1984: Cartagena
- 1985–1986: Poli Almería
- 1987–1988: Melilla
- 1988–1990: Gandía
- 1990–1991: Hércules
- 1991–1993: Yeclano
- 1993–1994: Murcia
- 1994–1995: Granada
- 1995–1998: Yeclano
- 1999–2000: Novelda
- 2003–2004: Yeclano
- 2006–2007: Granada

José Víctor Rodríguez de Miguel (10 February 1945 – 3 March 2016) was a Spanish football manager, taking charge over the likes of Real Murcia, Real Oviedo, and Granada CF. Throughout his long managerial career, he achieved eight promotions with different teams.

== Biography ==
Born on 10 February 1945 in Palencia, Castile and León, Rodríguez could not be a footballer due to a heart disease for which he underwent surgery on several occasions, and thus, in the 1964–65 season, at the age of just 19, he began his career as a coach in the ranks of Real Murcia. From then on he went through all the ranks of the Grana team, becoming the regional youth coach with Murcia at the time when players from Murcia, Albacete, and Alicante were called up under that flag, and under his leadership, a methodical and innovative coach at that time, he guided the Murcia youth team to several Spanish championships in its category in the early 1970s. He then became an assistant coach of Real Murcia, before finally taking charge over the first team, which he promoted to the First Division in both 1976 and 1980.

In the late 1960s, Rodríguez guided Cartagena FC from Preferente to the Tercera División with a team that became known by the press of the time as the SúperCartagena, having only lost one game that season. He coached the Cartagena team again in the 1982–83 and 1983–84 seasons, now in the Second Division.

Rodríguez also coached Albacete (1978–79), Oviedo (1981–82), UD Melilla (1887–88), CF Gandía (1988–90), Hércules CF (1990–91), Yeclano CF (1991–93, 1995–98, and 2003–04), Granada CF (1994–95 and 2006–07), Elche CF, and Mar Menor FC, some of them at different stages. He was also on the verge of a promotion with Yeclano in the 1990s.

Rodríguez was also the sports director of numerous clubs and was famous for his detailed reports on footballers when there was no other means than a typewriter. He had family ties with Cartagena where his brother lived, and he used to visit the Cartagonova stadium from time to time and boasted that he had the best archive of videos of football teams and players in his house in Pinar de Campoverde.

== Death ==
In June 2011, Rodríguez was admitted to the Torrevieja Hospital as a result of a heart problem with pulmonary complications.

Rodríguez died on 3 March 2016, at the age of 71, having been admitted to a hospital several times for serious heart problems. Since 11 February 2016, the headquarters of the Football Federation in Murcia has a classroom named after him.
