= Ramón Orriols =

Spanish footballer (1912–1986)

Personal information
- Full name: Ramón Orriols Canals
- Date of birth: 19 July 1912
- Place of birth: Barcelona, Catalonia, Spain
- Date of death: 19 September 1986 (aged 74)
- Place of death: Caracas, Venezuela
- Position: Defender

Youth career
- 1914–1916: Badalona

Senior career*
Years	Team	Apps	(Gls)
1930–1931	Espanyol		
1931–1932	Sevilla		
1932	Gimnástico		
1932–1934	Elche		
1934–1936	Hércules		
1937	Iluro SC		
1937	UE Vic		
1937–1941	Badalona		
1942–1943	Elche		

International career
1931	Catalonia	3	(0)

Managerial career
- 1964: Deportivo Miranda
- * Club domestic league appearances and goals

Ramón Orriols Canals (19 July 1912 – 19 September 1986) was a Spanish footballer who played as a defender for Espanyol and Hércules in the 1930s. He later worked as a manager of Deportivo Miranda in 1964.

== Football career ==
=== Club career ===
Born on 19 July 1912 in Barcelona, Orriols began playing football in the youth ranks of his hometown club Badalona before joining Espanyol in 1930, where he spent the 1930–31 season, playing a total of 10 official matches, 7 in the Catalan championship and three in La Liga.

In 1931, Orriols left for Sevilla, where he played 3 matches in the Andalusian Cup and several friendly matches. After brief stints at Gimnástico and Elche, he signed for top-flight team Hércules in 1934. In total, he played 10 matches in La Liga, three with Espanyol and seven with Hércules.

During the Spanish Civil War, Orriols played for Iluro SC, UE Vic, and again for his hometown club Badalona, where he continued after the war. In the 1942–43 season he played again with Elche, where he retired at the age of 31.

=== International career ===
In July and August 1931, Orriols played three matches with the Catalan national team, first on 25 and 26 July against his future club Gimnástico at the Vallejo, which both ended in losses, and then on 9 August 1931, in a tribute match to Jesús Pedret, helping Catalonia to a 5–2 win.

=== Managerial career ===
As a manager, Orriols briefly took charge of Deportivo Miranda in 1964, aged 52, being replaced by Edmur Pinto Ribeiro.

== Death ==
Orriols died in Caracas on 19 September 1986, at the age of 74.
