= Manuel Suárez (Spanish footballer) =

Spanish footballer and manager

Personal information
- Full name: Manuel Suárez de Begoña
- Date of birth: 1895
- Place of birth: Getxo, Spain
- Date of death: 23 August 1936 (aged 40–41)
- Place of death: Alicante, Spain
- Position: Forward

Youth career
- 1908–1917: Athletic Club

Senior career*
Years	Team	Apps	(Gls)
1916–1917	Arenas Getxo		
1917–1919	RCD Espanyol		
1925–1928	Athletic Club		
1927–1928	Atlético Madrid		
1928–1929	Arenas Getxo	10	(3)
1929–1930	Real Betis	5	(2)
1930–1932	Arenas Getxo	5	(3)
1932–1934	Hércules	2	(1)

Managerial career
- 1934–1936: Hércules
- * Club domestic league appearances and goals

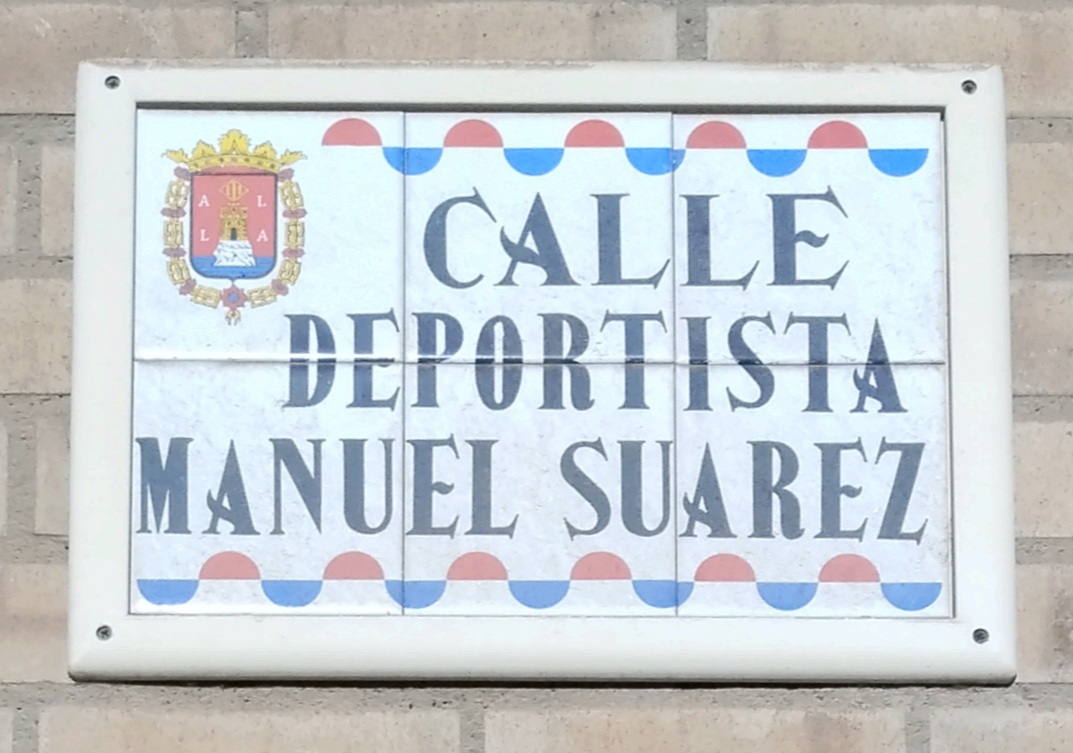
Street dedicated to the footballer Manuel Suárez de Begoña in the city of Alicante.

Manuel "Manolo" Suárez de Begoña (1895 – 23 August 1936) was a Spanish footballer and manager who played as forward for Arenas Getxo and Athletic Club.

== Club career ==
Suárez began to play football aged 13, at the Athletic Club amateur side. He studied at an English university for four years, where he practiced football and athletics.

After a tour of nine years at Athletic, all of them as an amateur, Suárez moved to Arenas de Getxo in 1917, at the age of 22. He quickly became the club's starting striker and in his first season at the club, he guided Arenas to the 1917 Copa del Rey Final, in which Suárez netted the opening goal in an eventual 1–2 loss to Madrid FC (now Real Madrid).

After two year spell with RCD Espanyol and a few years without a club, he joined his youth club, Athletic Club, in 1925, making his debut on 11 October, scoring four goals against Sestao. He played eight more matches in the Regional Championship of Biscay, in which he scored a total of fourteen goals. On 7 March 1926, he made his Copa del Rey debut for Athletic in a 1–3 loss to Real Unión. In total, he registered 35 goals in 36 official matches with the Basque team.

On 10 February 1929, Suárez made his debut in the Primera División with Arenas against Athletic de Madrid, scoring a consolation goal in a 2–3 loss. With only one year in his professional contract with Bilbao, he signed for Real Betis in the Segunda División, where he could hardly play due to an injury that left him practically blank, so he returned to Arenas in 1930, where he played the following 2 seasons in the First Division.

Ahead of the 1932–33 season, he accepted a succulent offer from the president of Hércules CF José Antonio Larrinaga to play in Alicante in the Tercera División. His signing was announced over the loudspeaker during the break of a friendly match against Real Madrid, on the occasion of the inauguration of the Bardín Stadium (the club's new stadium), causing great jubilation among the public. He made his debut for the Herculaneum team against their eternal rival, Elche CF, in Altabix on 2 October 1932, in a Murcia Regional Championship match, netting twice in a 3–2 win. The herculanos went on to win the said Championship, sealing the title in the return fixture against Elche, which they won 3–1 with one goal from Suárez. That was the first official title in the history of the club.

== International career ==
He was summoned to play for the Spanish team in a friendly match against Portugal on 10 January 1928 in Estádio do Lumiar, but did not make the starting eleven.

== Managerial career ==
On 14 January 1934, Hércules CF fired coach Lippo Hertzka, and decided to name him Suárez as his successor, taking over as coach of the team and serving as player-manager until the end of the season. Although his first season in charge ended in failure, Hércules managed to finally be promoted to the Segunda División in July 1934 thanks to a restructuring carried out by the RFEF. Although still playing a few games, an aging Suárez progressively retired as a player to concentrate on his technical duties, and so, during the 1935–36 season, the 39-year-old Suárez retired as a player and served only as a coach. He exceed all expectations when his team achieved promotion to the First Division in that same campaign, being the main architect of the team's new-found strength and potential. It was the first promotion of the blue and white club to the highest tier of Spanish football. He is the only Hércules coach to have won two promotions.

In their La Liga debut, Suárez's players managed to survive comfortably and finished in sixth, with 24 points. They also played a great role in the 1936 Copa del Presidente de la República, beating the great Sevilla FC in the round of 16 with a 2–0 win in the tiebreakers, before beating Zaragoza FC with a resounding 3–0 win in the quarterfinals and being eliminated in the semifinals only by Real Madrid. The Herculaneum club has never been able to match this achievement.

== Death ==
However, at the end of the 1935–36 season, the Spanish Civil War broke out in Spain. A few days later Manolo Suárez was arrested while walking through the Portal de Elche. Some sources suggest that he was a Falangist, while other sources state that he was arrested simply for being friends with two people from the Falange, but in either way, the Basque had nothing to do with the coup, and was not even put on trial for it. On 23 August 1936, Manuel Suárez was assassinated on the outskirts of Alicante at the onset of the Spanish Civil War. His body was found dead on a roadside ditch near the city of Alicante. His funeral took place in the El Campello Cemetery and only a small group of friends dared to attend, among whom was the future president of Hércules Eladio Pérez.

After the War ended, Hércules CF installed a commemorative plaque in the box of the Bardín Stadium in memory of Manolo Suárez. In Alicante there is a street named after him.

== Honours ==
=== Player ===
Arenas Club

- Copa del Rey runner-up: 1917

Athletic Bilbao

  - Biscay Championship: 1925–26, 1927–28

=== As a manager ===
Hércules

  - Tercera División promotion: 1933–34
  - Segunda División champions: 1934–35
