= Nikolai Bardin =

Russian ice hockey winger (born 1976)

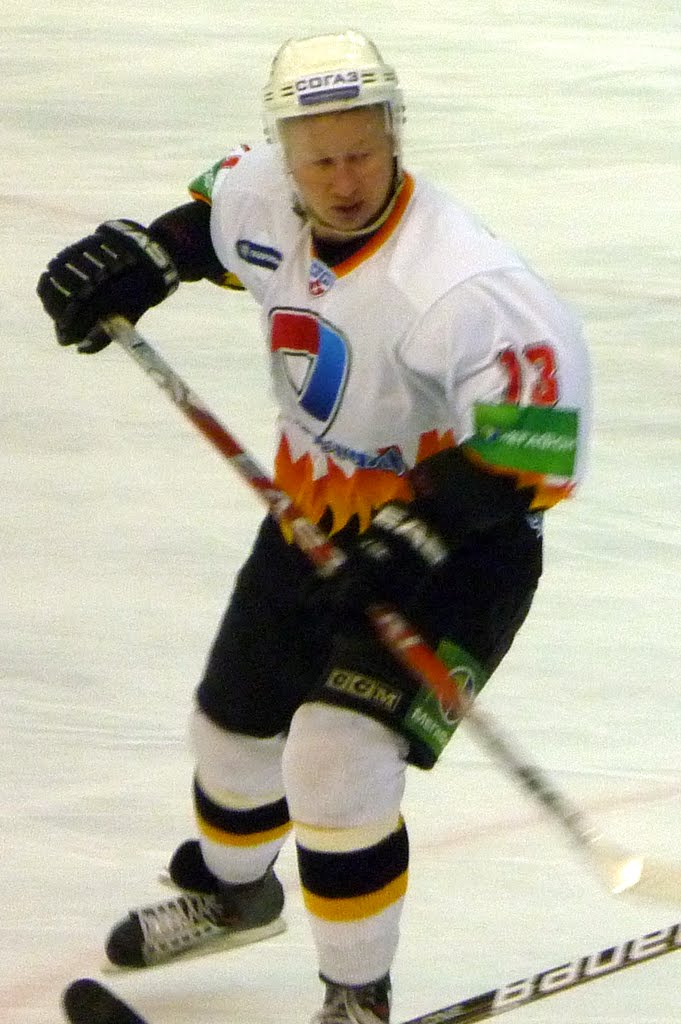
- Born: 23 January 1976 (age 50) Perm, Russia
- Height: 5 ft 8 in (173 cm)
- Weight: 163 lb (74 kg; 11 st 9 lb)
- Position: Left wing
- Shot: Left
- KHL team Former teams: Yugra Khanty-Mansiysk; HC Severstal
- NHL draft: Undrafted
- Playing career: 1993–2014

Nikolai Bardin (born January 23, 1976) is a Russian professional ice hockey winger. He currently plays with Yugra Khanty-Mansiysk of the Kontinental Hockey League (KHL). Before joining his current team, Bardin played five seasons with HC Severstal of the KHL.

== Career statistics ==
			Regular season					Playoffs
Season	Team	League	GP	G	A	Pts	PIM	GP	G	A	Pts	PIM
1993–94	Molot Perm	Russia	28	2	1	3	18	—	—	—	—	—
1993–94	Rossiya Krasnokamsk	Russia3	—	1	—	—	—	—	—	—	—	—
1994–95	Molot Perm	Russia	35	4	6	10	2	3	1	1	2	2
1994–95	Rossiya Krasnokamsk	Russia2	11	4	6	10	6	—	—	—	—	—
1994–95	Progress Solikamsk	Russia4	—	—	—	—	—	4	3	0	3	0
1995–96	Molot Perm	Russia	45	7	6	13	12	2	1	0	1	2
1995–96	Molot Perm-2	Russia2	3	1	2	3	4	—	—	—	—	—
1996–97	Molot Perm	Russia	24	3	6	9	14	—	—	—	—	—
1996–97	Molot-Prikamye Perm	Russia3	1	1	1	2	0	—	—	—	—	—
1997–98	Molot-Prikamye Perm	Russia	45	9	9	18	35	2	0	0	0	0
1998–99	Molot-Prikamye Perm	Russia	42	8	17	25	14	7	0	2	2	0
1999–00	Molot-Prikamye Perm	Russia	38	10	18	28	34	3	0	0	0	0
2000–01	HC Neftekhimik Nizhnekamsk	Russia	36	6	4	10	16	3	0	0	0	0
2000–01	HC Neftekhimik Nizhnekamsk-2	Russia3	1	0	0	0	0	—	—	—	—	—
2001–02	HC Neftekhimik Nizhnekamsk	Russia	48	14	7	21	16	—	—	—	—	—
2002–03	HC Neftekhimik Nizhnekamsk	Russia	41	4	9	13	8	—	—	—	—	—
2002–03	HC Neftekhimik Nizhnekamsk-2	Russia3	1	1	0	1	0	—	—	—	—	—
2003–04	Molot-Prikamye Perm	Russia2	49	14	33	47	16	14	6	6	12	4
2004–05	Molot-Prikamye Perm	Russia	31	7	10	17	12	—	—	—	—	—
2004–05	HC Neftekhimik Nizhnekamsk	Russia	24	2	2	4	6	3	0	0	0	0
2005–06	Molot-Prikamye Perm	Russia	51	4	17	21	24	—	—	—	—	—
2006–07	Severstal Cherepovets	Russia	37	7	5	12	30	4	0	2	2	2
2006–07	Severstal Cherepovets-2	Russia3	1	1	1	2	0	—	—	—	—	—
2007–08	Severstal Cherepovets	Russia	52	8	23	31	32	2	0	0	0	2
2008–09	Severstal Cherepovets	KHL	55	10	17	27	30	—	—	—	—	—
2009–10	Severstal Cherepovets	KHL	52	5	18	23	24	—	—	—	—	—
2010–11	Severstal Cherepovets	KHL	49	8	12	20	26	6	0	1	1	4
2011–12	Yugra Khanty-Mansiysk	KHL	34	2	5	7	18	—	—	—	—	—
2012–13	Molot-Prikamye Perm	VHL	50	12	22	34	20	10	4	3	7	4
2013–14	Molot-Prikamye Perm	VHL	40	8	9	17	16	6	0	3	3	0
KHL totals			190	25	52	77	98	6	0	1	1	4
Russia totals			577	95	140	235	273	29	2	4	6	8
