= Antonio Aparicio (footballer, born 1913) =

Spanish footballer

Personal information
- Full name: Antonio Aparicio Perales
- Date of birth: 10 September 1913
- Place of birth: Enguera, Valencia, Spain
- Date of death: Unknown
- Position: Midfielder

Senior career*
Years	Team	Apps	(Gls)
1932–1933	Ontinyent CF		
1933–1934	Valencia CF		
1934–1935	Levante UD		
1935–1941	Hércules CF		
1941–1942	Real Valladolid		
1941–1942	Granada CF		
- * Club domestic league appearances and goals

Antonio Aparicio Perales (10 September 1913) was a Spanish footballer who played as a midfielder for Valencia CF and CD Castellón. He was a member of the Hércules CF wonder team.

== Biography ==
Antonio Aparicio was born in Enguera on 10 September 1913, and made his professional debut with Ontinyent CF in 1932, when he was only 19. In just one year he had become the best left-handed winger in the region and the star of the team, drawing the attention of several scouts nationwide. In the summer of 1933 he was tried out by Sevilla FC, but Valencia, criticized by the local press for letting an Andalusian club take one of the pearls of Valencian football, moved quickly and signed him before the Seville team could make you an offer.

Against all odds, Jack Greenwell barely gave him any opportunities, and apart from six friendlies, he only played one official match in the First Division against an ultra-defensive Arenas club de Getxo, in a match that ended goalless and with half the stands yawning despite Aparicio's speed and overflow, with good dribbling and capable of delivering measured crosses into the area. At the end of the season, and seeing that Anton Fibver had similar football tastes to those of his predecessor, he preferred to look for other options and signed with Levante UD, where he offered excellent benefits that allowed him to sign, in 1935, for Hércules FC, which It was in the First Division.

Antonio settled in the Alicante club, remaining there until 1941, including the period of the Spanish Civil War, except for a brief return to Valencia to participate with the Mestalla team in two matches in the Mediterranean League. With Hércules, he scored 15 goals in 56 games in the top category, contributing to one of the best periods in the club's history. At the end of his stay on the Costa Blanca, he accepted an interesting offer from Valladolid, which, based in the Segunda División, was fighting to compete for promotion promotions. The following year he went to Granada, where he remained for four seasons, three of them in the First Division and one in the second, in 1945. In the summer of 1946 he announced his retirement as a professional footballer at the age of thirty-two, after having defended the Granada shirt on 47 occasions.
