= Estadio Bardín =

Sports venue in Barcelona (1902–1923)

- Location: Alicante, Valencia, Spain
- Capacity: 8,000

Construction
- Opened: 18 September 1932
- Closed: 1954
- Cost: 200.000 pesetas
- Architect: Juan Vidal

Tenant
- Hércules CF (1932–1954)

The Estadio Bardín (Spanish: Bardín Stadium) was a football field in Alicante that existed between 1932 and 1954, serving as the second playing field of Hércules CF.

== History ==
=== Early history ===
Estadio Bardín was inaugurated on 18 September 1932, replacing La Viña as the new stadium of Hércules, which had just been proclaimed champion of the Tercera Division, but lost in the promotion play-offs. La Viña was an enclosed field that had become too small for Hércules, so Renato Bardín Mas, then treasurer of Hércules, faced with the need for a larger football pitch, convinced his father René Bardín Deville, a French businessman based in Alicante, to build said stadium on some land he owned located in the Benalúa ravine, next to the Army barrack (currently the Alipark neighborhood).

The ribbon of the opening ceremony was cut by the mayor of Alicante, Lorenzo Carbonell, and then the 14-year-old Lolita Bardín, dressed in a Hercules shirt, took the honorary kick-off of the stadium's opening match, a friendly against the great Real Madrid, which lined-up with the likes of Ricardo Zamora, Jacinto Quincoces, and Jaime Lazcano; Madrid logically won 2–0 with goals from Páez (own goal) and Carles Bestit. The match was attended by a large audience and various important personalites, including the aforementioned Carbonell and the club's entire board of directors with president Antonio Larrinaga Gorostiza at the head, plus the local press and graphic co-responsible parties.

Hércules then won the Third Division for the second time, and this time achieved promotion to the Segunda División, which they won (1934–35) at the first time of asking, thus not only securing a third league title in just 4 years, but also promotion to the Spanish top tier for the first time in its history. On 10 November 1935, Bardín hosted Hércules' debut in La Liga, losing 0–1 to Real Madrid. Hércules finished their debut season in La Liga in sixth place; the highlight of the season was a 1–0 home victory over the eventual champions Athletic Bilbao.

=== Later history ===
During the Spanish Civil War, the Bardín stadium was used by the Republican side for different functions, but was not mistreated, so no works or repairs were required once the competition resumed in the 1939–40 season. In Bardín, Hércules played in the First Division for five seasons (1935–36, 1939–42, and 1945–46). In the 1940s, the Hércules supporters created an anthem for the club whose opening line is: En el estadio de Bardín/ha surgido un campeón (Spanish: "In the Bardín stadium/A champion has emerged).

On 27 June 1954, Bardín hosted its last-ever game, a promotion play-off match between Hércules and Osasuna, and it proved to be too small to accommodate all the 12,000 fans who wanted to be present; Hércules won 2–0 with goals from Pina and Roth. Hercules left the Bardín Stadium and returned to the La Viña, which had been expanded for a capacity of 18,000 spectators.

== Lay out ==
The stadium was designed by architect Juan Vidal, and had a final cost of 200,000 pesetas (1,200 euros). Having a rectangular shape, it was quickly nicknamed the bombonera (the chocolate box) by the citizens because its design resembled a box of chocolates.

Its inaugural capacity of 8,000 spectators, but it was later expanded to 12,000. The south stand was known as the portería del cuartel (the barracks goal) because it was next to one of the walls of the 11th San Fernando Infantry Regiment Headquarters. The north stand was known as the portería de la ruta (the road goal) or the portería de la cerámica (the ceramics goal).

The back of the barracks had comfortable six-story wooden stands, the last one with a backrest. The stadium also had a small pastry bar run by Francisco Llorca and Manuel Pastor.
