= Kick-off (association football) =

Method of starting play in association football

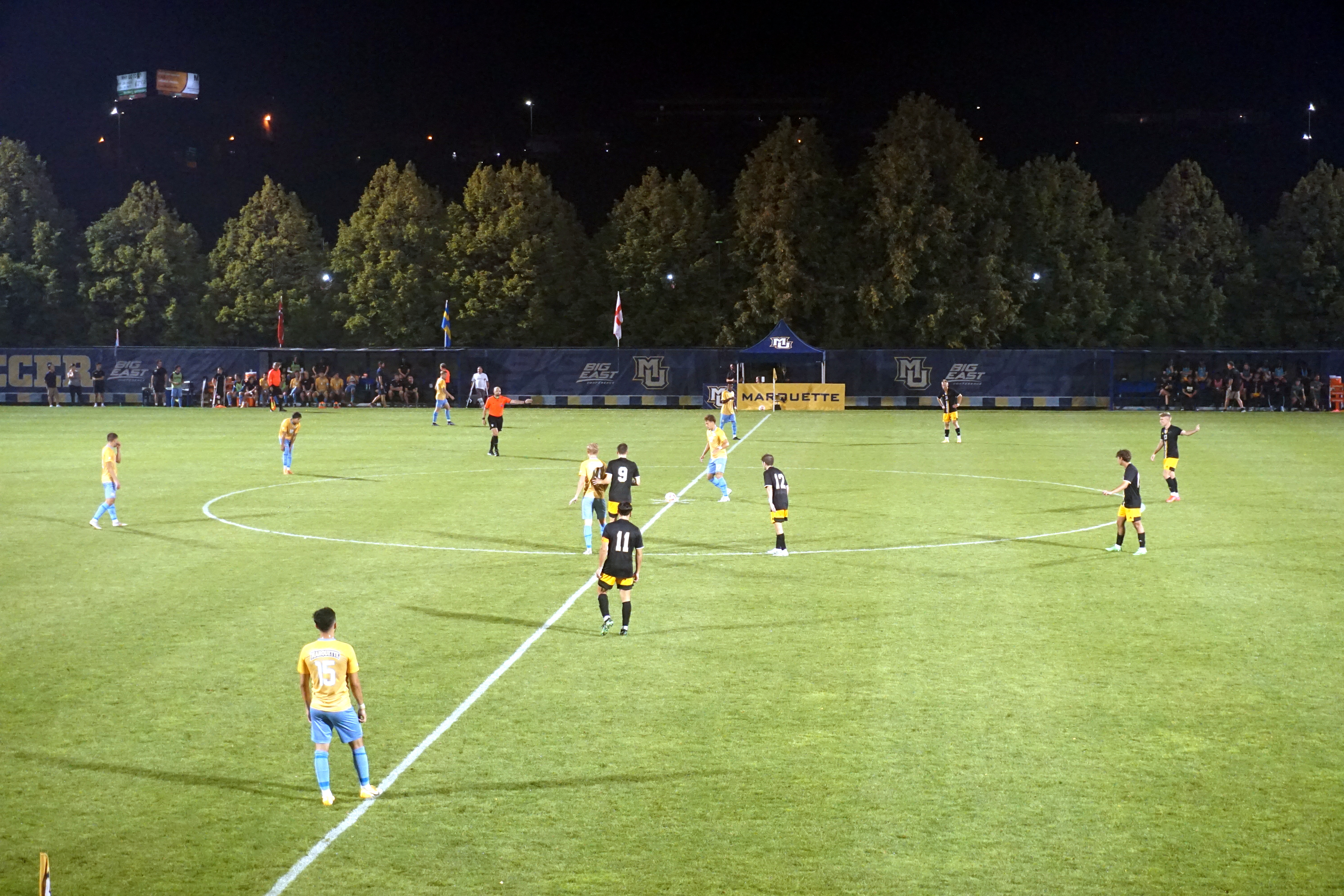
At kick-off, players other than the kicker are required to be in their team's own half of the pitch, and opposition players may not be in the 10-yard diameter centre circle.

A kick-off is the method of starting and, in some cases, restarting play in a game of association football. The rules concerning the kick-off are part of Law 8 of the Laws of the Game.

== Award ==
A kick-off is used to start each half of play, and each period of extra time where applicable. The team that wins the pre-game coin toss may choose either

- to take the initial kick-off (in which case the team losing the toss chooses which end of the pitch to attack in the first half), or
- to choose which end of the pitch to attack in the first half (in which case the team losing the toss takes the initial kick-off).

The kick-off to start the second half is taken by team which did not take the initial kick-off. If extra time is played, another coin-toss is used at the beginning of this period.

A kick-off is also used to restart play after a goal is scored, and is taken by the team that conceded the goal.

== Procedure ==
The ball must be stationary and on the centre spot. All players, except for the kicker, must be in their own half of the field of play, and all opposing players must remain at least 10 yards (9.15 m) from the ball (a distance marked on the pitch by the centre circle), until the ball is in play.

Once the referee has given the signal for the kick-off, the ball is kicked in any direction. The ball is in play once it is kicked and clearly moves. The player taking the kick-off may not touch the ball again until it has been touched by another player. A goal may be scored directly from a kick-off against the opposing team.

== Infringements ==
If the kick-off is taken with a moving ball, or from the wrong place, it is retaken. A retake is also required if a player other than the kicker is in the opponents' half, or an opponent is less than 10 yards from the centre spot. A player who excessively delays the restart of play is cautioned.

It is an offence for the kicker to touch the ball a second time before another player has touched it; this is punishable by an indirect free kick to the opposing team from where the offence occurred, unless the second touch was also a more serious handling offence, in which case it is punishable by a direct free kick.

== History ==
=== Before 1863 ===
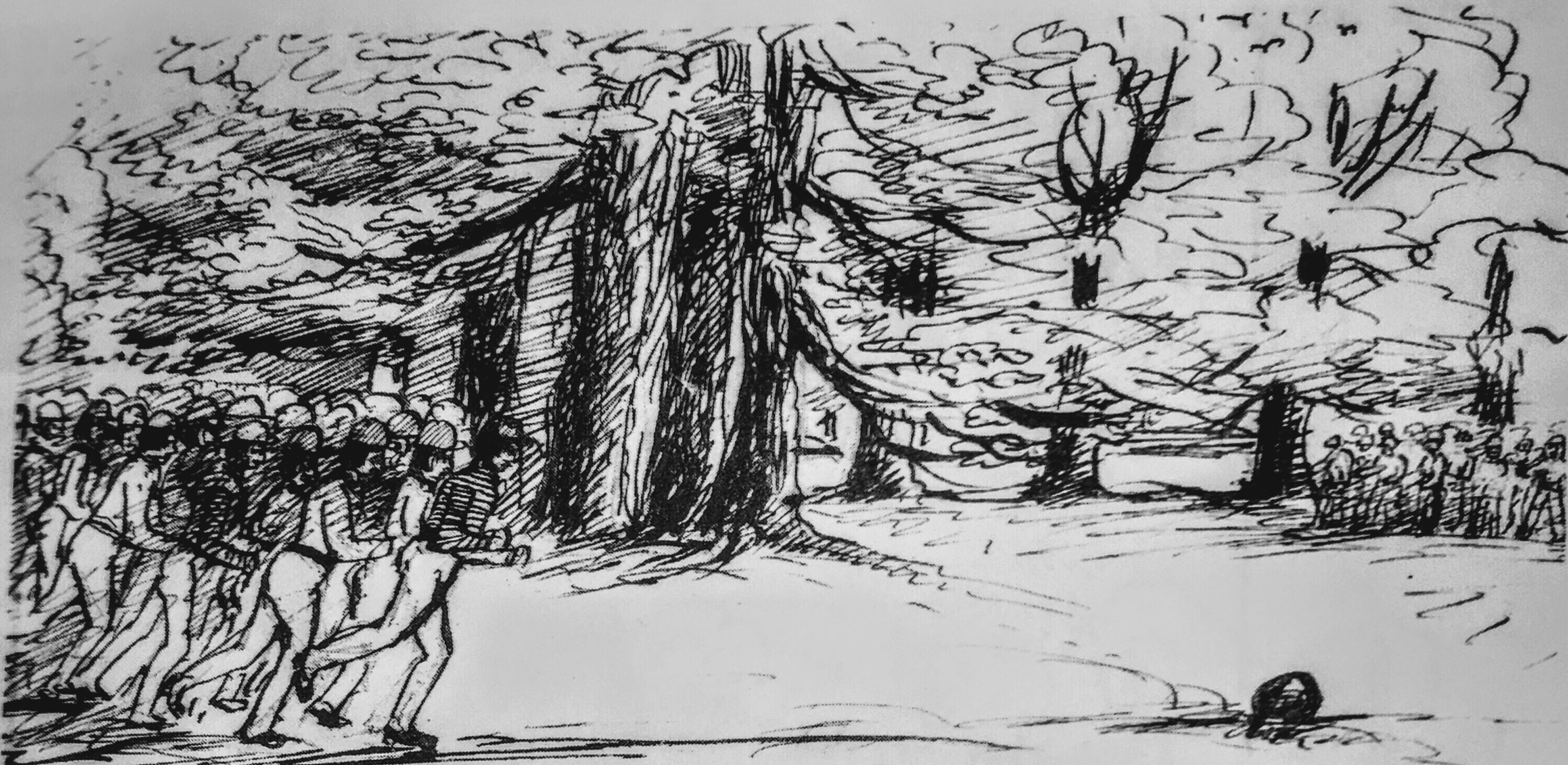
Illustration of the kick-off used at Rugby School (1845)

One of the few things known about the rules of English traditional football is the means by which the matches were started: it appears to have been the custom in several places for the game to start with the ball being "thrown up" in the middle of the field of play by a neutral official. The players would then contest for possession of the ball as it descended. The rules of Surrey Football Club, published in 1849, likewise specify that the game is started by the ball being "tossed up in the centre of the ground".

A game played on Christmas Day 1841 began with the ball placed in the middle of the field of play. A pistol was fired to signal the beginning of the match, after which each team attempted to "get[] the first kick".

The oldest published laws of football (Rugby School, 1845) specify that the game is to be started with a "kick off" from the middle of the field of play, which must be a place-kick. Most codes of laws from this era provide for a similar "kick off" from the centre of the ground; these include the Cambridge rules of 1856, the Sheffield rules of 1858, and the 1858 rules of Harrow football. One exception is the laws for the Eton field game (1862), which specify instead a "bully" in the middle of the field (similar to a scrummage in rugby union).

The novel Tom Brown's School Days (published in 1857 but based on the author's experiences at Rugby School from 1834 to 1842) gives a detailed description of the kick-off:

[H]as'nt old Brooke won the toss, with his lucky halfpenny, and got choice of goals, and kick-off? The new ball you may see lie there quite by itself, in the middle, pointing towards the school or island goal; in another minute it will be well on its way there [...] [O]ld Brooke takes a half-a-dozen quick steps, and away goes the ball spinning towards the School goal; seventy yards before it touches ground, and at no point above twelve or fifteen feet high, a model kick-off; and the School-house cheer and rush on; the ball is returned, and they meet it and drive it back amongst the masses of the School already in motion.

The passage above suggests that the winner of the toss, in the Rugby game, was awarded both kick-off and choice of goals. This was also the case in the Cambridge Rules of 1863, while in the Melbourne FC Rules of 1859 and 1860 the winner of the toss chose goals, with the loser taking the kick-off.

=== The FA Laws of 1863 ===
The original FA laws of 1863 specify that "[t]he winner of the toss shall have the choice of goals. The game shall be commenced by a place kick from the centre of the ground by the side losing the toss, the other side shall not approach within 10 yards of the ball until it is kicked off". A "place kick" is further defined as "a kick at the ball while on the ground, in any position in which the kicker may choose to place it". The kick-off, which required the ball to be on the ground, was thus distinguished from the free kick, which could be taken "in such manner as the kicker may think fit", language which was interpreted as permitting a kick from hand (a drop-kick or a punt).

Another law states that "[a]fter a goal is won the losing side shall kick off and the goals shall be changed."

=== Subsequent developments ===
==== The initial kick-off ====
The original laws of 1863 specified that the initial kick-off should be taken by the side losing the toss. In 1873, the team winning the toss was given the option of whether to choose ends or to take the initial kick-off. In 1997, the law was changed back, so that the initial kick-off was once again taken by the team losing the toss. The law was changed once again so beginning on 1 June 2019, the side winning the toss once again has the choice between kicking-off and choosing ends. The justification for this rule-change was that "[r]ecent law changes have made the kick-off more dynamic (e.g. a goal can be scored directly from the kick-off) so captains winning the toss often ask to take the kick-off."

==== Kick-off in the second half ====
The original laws of 1863 made no provision for half-time. In 1870, based on a proposal by Wanderers F.C., a change of ends was introduced at half-time, but only if no goals had been scored in the first half; the law did not specify the means by which play should be started in the second half. In 1874, a change in the laws proposed by Harrow Chequers specified that a kick-off should occur at the start of the second half, provided no goal had been scored up to that point; this kick-off was taken by same side as originally kicked off the game. In 1875 a further change proposed by Queen's Park F.C. was accepted; there is always a break and change of ends at half-time, and the kick-off for the second half is taken by the opposite team to that which kicked off the first half.

==== Players' position ====
The original laws of 1863 placed no restriction (other than offside) on the players' position during the kick-off, except that opponents could not approach within 10 yards of the ball. In 1874, a new restriction was added that all players had to be in their own half of the field. In 2017, the law was altered to allow the kicker to be in the opponents' half.

==== Direction of the kick ====
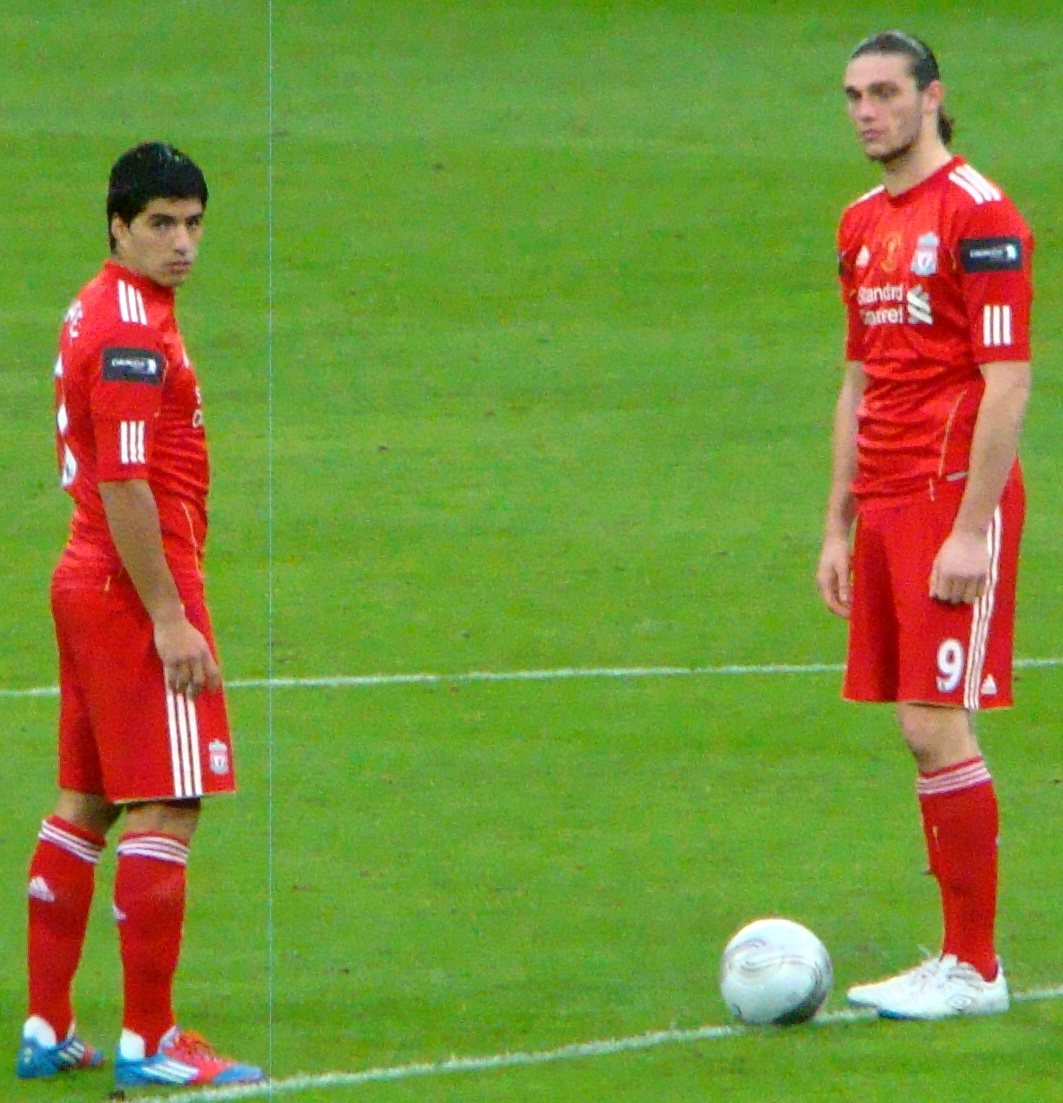
Prior to 2016 the kick-off was required to be in a forwards direction. Typically one player would tap the ball forwards, immediately followed by a teammate passing the ball backwards to the rest of the team.

As a result of the International Football Conference of December 1882, it was decided that the kick-off had to be kicked forwards. This change was implemented in the Laws of the Game in 1883. This restriction was removed in 2016.

==== Putting the ball into play ====
In 1905, it was specified that the ball "must make a complete circuit or travel the distance of its circumference" before being in play. In 1997, this requirement was eliminated: the ball became in play as soon as it was kicked and moved. In 2016, it was specified that the ball must "clearly" move.

==== Dribbling ====
In 1875, it was forbidden for the player taking the kick-off to play the ball again until it had been kicked by another player.

==== Scoring a goal from the kick-off ====
In 1875, it was forbidden to score a goal directly from the kick-off. This restriction was reversed in 1997, when it was permitted once again to score a goal directly from the kick-off. In 2016, at the same time the backwards kick-off was legalized, the possibility of scoring an own goal directly from the kick-off (an extremely unlikely situation) was removed, with a corner kick being awarded to the opponents instead.

==== Pitch markings ====
In 1891, internal pitch-markings were introduced. These included a "suitable mark" at the centre of the pitch and a "circle of radius 10 yards" (now known as the "centre circle") to mark the area within which opponents were forbidden.

==== Remedy for infringements of the laws ====
In 1882, an indirect free kick was awarded to the opposition when the player taking the kick-off touched the ball a second time before it had touched another player. In 1887, an indirect free kick was also awarded for any other infringement of the laws; in 1903 this was changed to a retake.

==== Summary ====
Date	Awarded at beginning of match	Awarded after goal scored	Awarded at start of second half	Opponents may approach within 10 yards	Players may be in opponents' half	Ball may be kicked backwards	Attacking goal may be scored	Own goal may be scored	Kicker may play ball again before it is touched by another player	Remedy for infringement other than double touch	Date
1863	Yes; to the side losing the toss	Yes; to the side conceding the goal	No	No	Yes	Yes	Yes	Yes	Yes	None specified	1863
1873	Yes; the side winning the toss may choose to take the kickoff or to have choice of goals	Yes; to the side conceding the goal	No	No	Yes	Yes	Yes	Yes	Yes	None specified	1873
1874	Yes; the side winning the toss may choose to take the kickoff or to have choice of goals	Yes; to the side conceding the goal	Only if no goals were scored in the first half; awarded to the same team as kicked off the match	No	No	Yes	Yes	Yes	Yes	None specified	1874
1875	Yes; the side winning the toss may choose to take the kickoff or to have choice of goals	Yes; to the side conceding the goal	Yes; to the opposite side to that which kicked off the match	No	No	Yes	No	No	No; no remedy specified for infringement	None specified	1875
1882	Yes; the side winning the toss may choose to take the kickoff or to have choice of goals	Yes; to the side conceding the goal	Yes; to the opposite side to that which kicked off the match	No	No	Yes	No	No	No; infringement results in indirect free kick	None specified	1882
1883	Yes; the side winning the toss may choose to take the kickoff or to have choice of goals	Yes; to the side conceding the goal	Yes; to the opposite side to that which kicked off the match	No	No	No	No	No	No; infringement results in indirect free kick	None specified	1883
1887	Yes; the side winning the toss may choose to take the kickoff or to have choice of goals	Yes; to the side conceding the goal	Yes; to the opposite side to that which kicked off the match	No	No	No	No	No	No; infringement results in indirect free kick	Indirect free kick	1887
1903	Yes; the side winning the toss may choose to take the kickoff or to have choice of goals	Yes; to the side conceding the goal	Yes; to the opposite side to that which kicked off the match	No	No	No	No	No	No; infringement results in indirect free kick	Retake	1903
1997	Yes; to the side losing the toss	Yes; to the side conceding the goal	Yes; to the opposite side to that which kicked off the match	No	No	No	Yes	Yes	No; infringement results in indirect free kick	Retake	1997
2016	Yes; to the side losing the toss	Yes; to the side conceding the goal	Yes; to the opposite side to that which kicked off the match	No	No	Yes	Yes	No	No; infringement results in indirect free kick	Retake	2016
2017	Yes; to the side losing the toss	Yes; to the side conceding the goal	Yes; to the opposite side to that which kicked off the match	No	Kicker only	Yes	Yes	No	No; infringement results in indirect free kick	Retake	2017
2019	Yes; the side winning the toss may choose to take the kickoff or to have choice of goals	Yes; to the side conceding the goal	Yes; to the opposite side to that which kicked off the match	No	Kicker only	Yes	Yes	No	No; infringement results in indirect free kick	Retake	2019
