= Hércules CF =

Spanish association football team

Hércules
- Full name: Hércules de Alicante Club de Fútbol, S.A.D.
- Nicknames: Los Herculanos / Els Herculans (The Herculeans); Los Griegos / Els Grecs (The Greeks); Los Blanquiazules / Els Blanc-i-blaus (The White-and-Blues)
- Founded: 25 October 1922; 104 years ago as Hércules Foot-ball Club
- Stadium: Estadio José Rico Pérez
- Capacity: 29,500
- Owner: Enrique Ortiz
- President: Carlos Parodi
- Head coach: Beto Company
- League: Primera Federación – Group 2
- 2025–26: Primera Federación – Group 2, 9th of 20
- Website: herculesdealicantecf.com
Home colours	Away colours	Third colours

Hércules de Alicante Club de Fútbol, S.A.D. ([ˈeɾkules]) is a Spanish football team in Alicante, in the Valencian Community. Founded on 25 October 1922, it currently plays in Primera Federación and plays its home games at the 29,500-capacity Estadio José Rico Pérez.

== History ==
=== First years ===
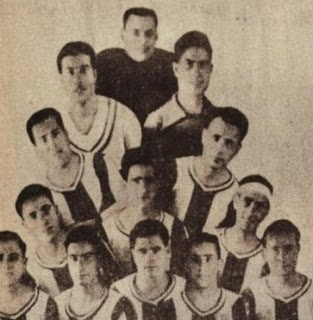
Hércules FC first team in the 1920s with Vicente Pastor Alfosea, the founder of the club, in the background.

Hércules CF has been documented since 1914, although not officially registered until 26 September 1922, alongside Mercantil de Cartagena, Federación Levantina, and others. Its founder was Vicente Pastor Alfosea, dubbed "El Chepa", who named the club after the legendary Greek hero Hercules, who was a strong and invincible man, two characteristics that Pastor wanted to see reproduced in his team. In its early days, the club played in various locations, the foothills of la montañosa, the lands of l'Hort del tio Ron, the campo de Benalúa or the facilities of the Alicante Recreation Club. At first, the team played in white and red striped shirts and black pants.

Hércules gradually became more structured, winning a children's tournament in 1918, and forming a senior squad in 1919, and on 22 June of that year, the club played its first official match, against Athletic Club Benaluense at the Copa Excelsior, which Hércules won 2–1; they went on to win that tournament as well. The club continued to grow in prominence and eventually became the subsidiary of the Club Natación Alicante, then the most important football team in Alicante.

=== Golden age ===
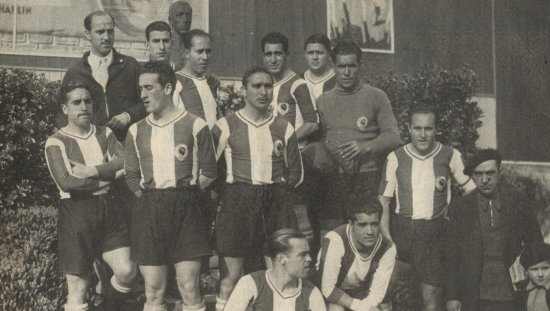
Hércules CF squad in 1936.

Following the dissolution of Natación, Hércules not only adopted its current blue and white colours, but also welcomed its entire entourage, including players, youth academy, and directors, such as Renato Bardín, as well as Natación's fanbase, then the biggest in Alicante, thus soon established itself as the best team in Alicante and achieving its first great triumph on 1 June 1930, when it reached the final of the Spanish Amateur Championship, which ended in a 3–2 loss to Club Gijón. Renato Bardín went on to become the club's treasurer, and when he was faced with the need for a larger football pitch, he convinced his father, Théophile Bardín, to build said stadium on some land he owned located in the Benalúa ravine, next to the Army barrack (currently the Alipark neighborhood). Thus, on 18 September 1932, Estadio Bardín was inaugurated, with the ribbon of the opening ceremony being cut by the mayor of Alicante, and with the stadium's opening match being a friendly against Real Madrid.

In the mid-1930s, the club won back-to-back Tercera División titles, achieving promotion to the Segunda División in 1934, which they won at the first time of asking (1934–35), thus not only securing a third league title in just 4 years, but also promotion to the Spanish top tier for the first time in its history. Hércules then finished their debut season in La Liga in sixth place; the highlight of the season was a 1–0 home victory over the eventual champions Athletic Bilbao.

Hércules would play sporadically in the top-flight for the next 40 years, playing mainly in the second division but going as low as the third. From 1961 to 1969, neighbours Alicante acted as its feeder club.

=== Recent history ===
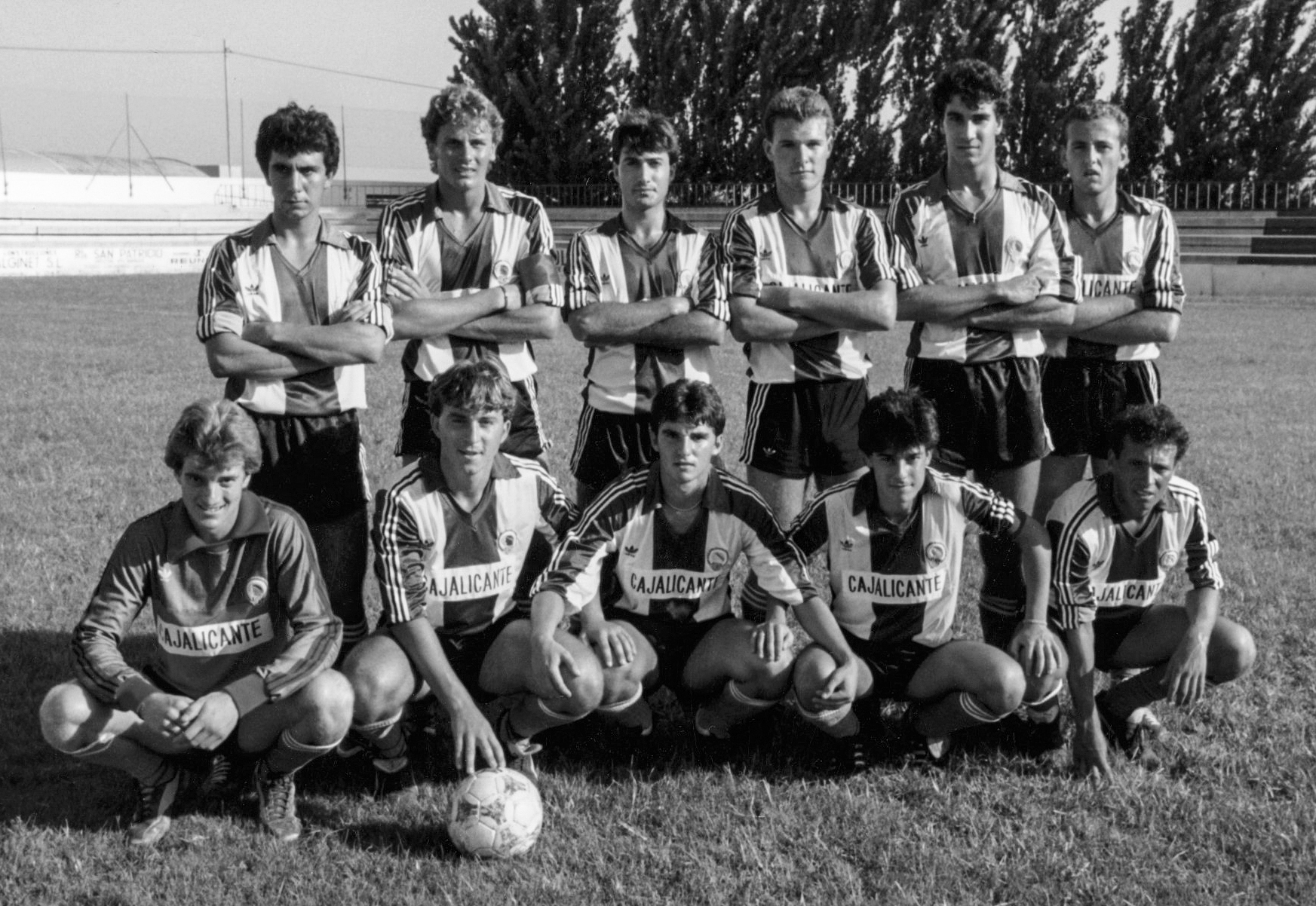
Hércules line-up, 1985. Second at the right top, Pétur Pétursson.

After a ten-year spell in the top flight, encompassing 12 seasons in the 1970s and '80s, the club only returned again in the 1996–97 campaign. Though eventually relegated, it managed two remarkable comeback wins over Barcelona, which ultimately handed the Liga title to Real Madrid.

In 2004–05, after five years in the third level, Hércules finished second, being subsequently promoted to the "silver category". After posting three consecutive solid seasons, the club narrowly missed out on a return to the top division in 2009, finishing fourth, three points behind last-promotee Tenerife.

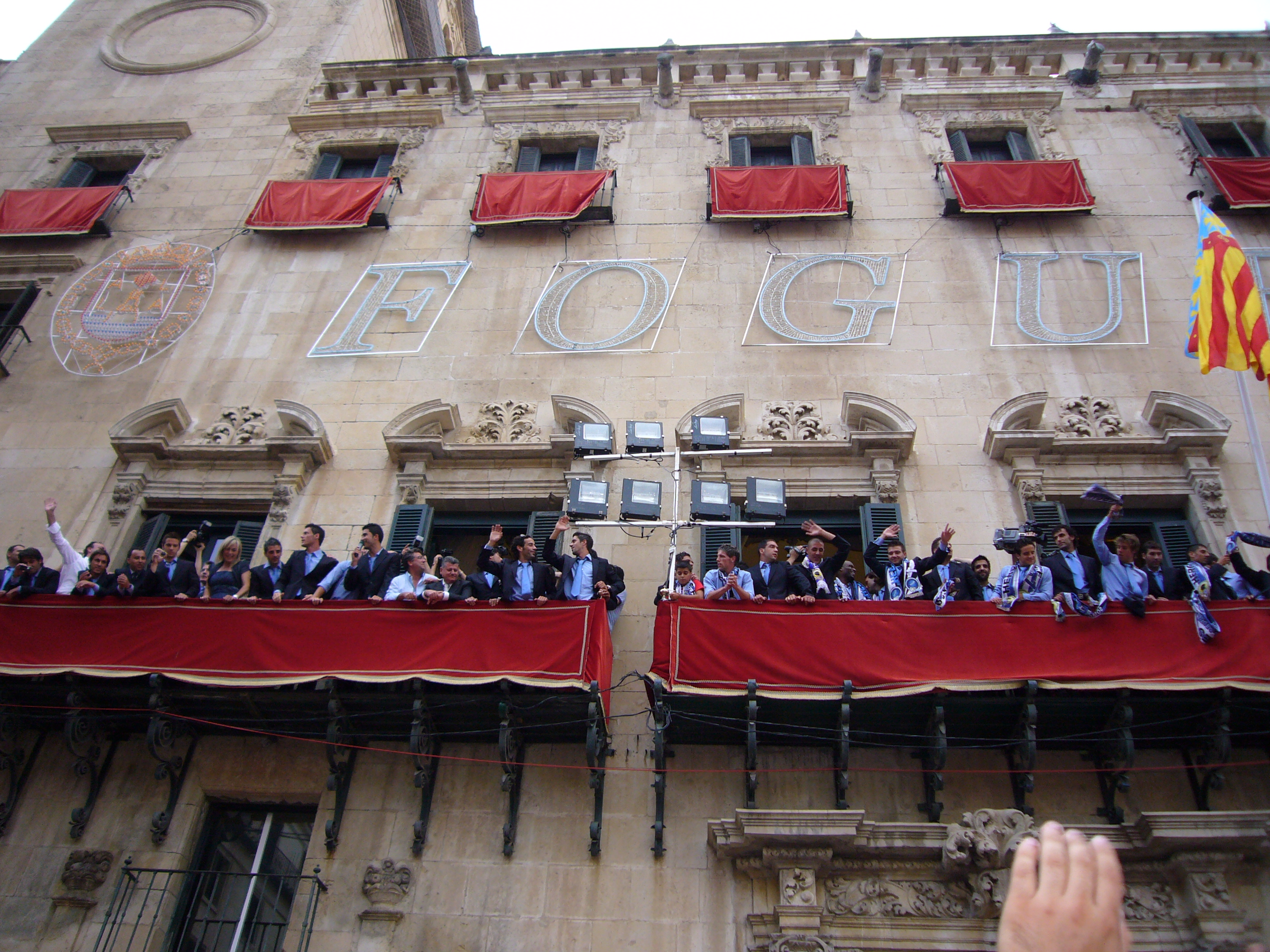
Hércules celebrate in Alicante, after returning to La Liga in 2010

The 2009–10 campaign saw Hércules promoted back into the top flight after 14 years in dramatic fashion: losing 0–1 at half-time at Rayo Vallecano, the team fought back to win 2–1 in the penultimate game of the season and leap frogged Real Betis into third place. In the last round, a 2–0 away win against relegation-threatened Real Unión guaranteed promotion, with the 4–0 win of Betis over Levante eventually counting for nothing (all three teams – Levante, Hércules and Betis – ended equal on points).

Early into the 2010–11 season, one year, three months and 19 days after Barcelona's last home defeat in the league, Hércules recorded a shock 2–0 win at the Camp Nou thanks to a brace from Nelson Valdez – Barcelona had won their last 11 home matches, scored at least three times in each of their last six league fixtures and were protecting a 17-game unbeaten streak. This was the Alicante outfit's third successive win over the Barcelona, having won both meetings in their previous top flight campaign 14 years before.

In the 2013–14 campaign, they were relegated to the Segunda División B after finishing in last place in the Segunda División.

In the 2016–17 Copa del Rey, the team drew 1–1 with Barcelona. In the second match at the Camp Nou (Barcelona's home), Hércules was defeated by the Catalonian side 7–0.

At the end of the 2016–17 Segunda División B season, Carlos Luque, previously coach of Hércules CF B, replaced Luis Tevenet, who had been dismissed shortly before the end of the league campaign. Following the season, the club’s accounts were frozen, preventing any squad movements except player releases. Basque businessman Juan Carlos Ramírez, who had previously been financing the team, succeeded Carlos Parodi as president. His primary objective was to lead negotiations with the tax authorities to ensure the club’s survival, which was threatened by debts that were difficult to settle due to the division in which the team was competing. After weeks of negotiations without a response from the public agency, Ramírez — who had pledged a €1.5 million investment to build a strong team capable of securing promotion — warned that he would leave the club if he did not receive a reply from the tax office, which would make him the shortest-serving president in the club's history.

After persistent efforts, Ramírez succeeded in reaching an agreement with the tax authorities, who accepted the conditions he imposed to settle the club’s debt. Attention then turned to building the squad, a task entrusted to former Hércules player Javier Portillo, who, following his retirement from professional football, had become increasingly involved in the club’s management and was appointed sporting director.

Hércules CF signed Argentine coach Gustavo Siviero to lead the team in the 2017–18 Segunda División B season. However, due to poor results, Siviero was dismissed after matchday nine and replaced by Claudio Barragán, with the aim of securing promotion to the Segunda División. On matchday 25, Barragán was also dismissed and succeeded by Josip Višnjić, who began his tenure with a 3–0 away victory over Deportivo Aragón. Despite this positive start, Hércules failed to reach the promotion play-off positions and ultimately finished the season in 10th place, missing out on qualification for the Copa del Rey.

In the 2018–19 season, under head coach Lluís Planagumà, Hércules finished second in the league table. During the promotion play-offs, the team eliminated Barakaldo and Logroñés but lost in the final to Ponferradina, suffering a 1–3 defeat at home at the José Rico Pérez Stadium and a 1–0 loss in the return leg in Ponferrada.

In the summer of 2020, Carmelo del Pozo was officially appointed as sporting director, with David Cubillo taking over as head coach with the objective of achieving promotion to the Segunda División. Despite finishing in the relegation zone to the Tercera División that season, Hércules avoided relegation due to the impact of the COVID-19 pandemic, which led the Royal Spanish Football Federation (RFEF) to restructure the league system and suspend relegations in the non-professional tiers.

The 2020–21 season, affected by the COVID-19 pandemic, was the final season under the name Segunda División B before being replaced by the new RFEF league structure. This restructuring introduced the Primera División RFEF as the third tier of Spanish football. As relegation had been suspended the previous season, the increased number of participating teams led to the creation of five initial groups, each split into two subgroups of 10 teams. Hércules finished 4th in their first-phase group, thus competing in the second phase for qualification to the Primera RFEF (Group II-D). However, they finished third in that stage, resulting in the club competing in the fourth tier, Segunda RFEF, for the 2021–22 season — a historic relegation for the club, which also faced financial difficulties.

Chart of Hércules CF league performance 1929–present

The 2021–2022 Segunda RFEF season ended with Hércules finishing fifth in Group V, qualifying for the promotion play-offs to Primera RFEF. The play-offs were held entirely in Alicante province due to the high number of teams from the area (Eldense, La Nucía, and Hércules), with Estadio José Rico Pérez among the venues. Hércules played their first play-off match at their home stadium (as the away team) against Unión Adarve, who had finished second in Group I. The match ended 1–1 after extra time, and Unión Adarve advanced due to their higher regular season ranking. As a result, Hércules remained in Spain's fourth tier during their centenary year.

After finishing 7th in Segunda RFEF in 2022–23, Hércules began the 2023–24 season strongly under coach Rubén Torrecilla, winning their first three games and leading the table at mid-season. A six-game winless run dropped them to fifth, but the team recovered with consecutive wins and, on 5 May 2024, secured promotion to Primera RFEF by defeating Lleida 2–1, finishing first in Group 3 with 65 points.

== Season to season ==
Season	Tier	Division	Place	Copa del Rey
1929–30	3	3ª	5th	
1931–32	3	3ª	1st	
1932–33	3	3ª	1st	Round of 16
1933–34	3	3ª	4th	Quarterfinals
1934–35	2	2ª	1st	Sixth round
1935–36	1	1ª	6th	Semifinals
1939–40	1	1ª	6th	Quarterfinals
1940–41	1	1ª	9th	Third round
1941–42	1	1ª	13th	First round
1942–43	2	2ª	4th	First round
1943–44	2	2ª	10th	Round of 32
1944–45	2	2ª	2nd	First round
1945–46	1	1ª	14th	First round
1946–47	2	2ª	4th	First round
1947–48	2	2ª	6th	Fifth round
1948–49	2	2ª	4th	Fifth round
1949–50	2	2ª	10th	Second round
1950–51	2	2ª	4th	
1951–52	2	2ª	4th	
1952–53	2	2ª	2nd	Second round

Season	Tier	Division	Place	Copa del Rey
1953–54	2	2ª	2nd	
1954–55	1	1ª	6th	Quarterfinals
1955–56	1	1ª	16th	Round of 16
1956–57	2	2ª	2nd	
1957–58	2	2ª	5th	
1958–59	2	2ª	13th	Round of 32
1959–60	3	3ª	1st	
1960–61	2	2ª	3rd	Round of 32
1961–62	2	2ª	7th	Round of 32
1962–63	2	2ª	8th	Round of 32
1963–64	2	2ª	2nd	Round of 32
1964–65	2	2ª	4th	First round
1965–66	2	2ª	1st	Round of 32
1966–67	1	1ª	15th	Round of 16
1967–68	2	2ª	15th	Round of 32
1968–69	3	3ª	1st	
1969–70	3	3ª	1st	Fourth round
1970–71	2	2ª	11th	Fourth round
1971–72	2	2ª	14th	Fifth round
1972–73	2	2ª	9th	Fifth round

Season	Tier	Division	Place	Copa del Rey
1973–74	2	2ª	2nd	Fourth round
1974–75	1	1ª	5th	Fifth round
1975–76	1	1ª	6th	Round of 16
1976–77	1	1ª	13th	Quarterfinals
1977–78	1	1ª	15th	Fourth round
1978–79	1	1ª	12th	Third round
1979–80	1	1ª	15th	Fourth round
1980–81	1	1ª	13th	Fourth round
1981–82	1	1ª	17th	Fourth round
1982–83	2	2ª	8th	Fourth round
1983–84	2	2ª	3rd	Round of 16
1984–85	1	1ª	15th	Round of 16
1985–86	1	1ª	17th	Fourth round
1986–87	2	2ª	5th	First round
1987–88	2	2ª	18th	Round of 32
1988–89	3	2ª B	8th	Third round
1989–90	3	2ª B	13th	
1990–91	3	2ª B	5th	First round
1991–92	3	2ª B	5th	Third round
1992–93	3	2ª B	4th	Third round

Season	Tier	Division	Place	Copa del Rey
1993–94	2	2ª	7th	Fourth round
1994–95	2	2ª	9th	Second round
1995–96	2	2ª	1st	Round of 16
1996–97	1	1ª	21st	Third round
1997–98	2	2ª	11th	Second round
1998–99	2	2ª	21st	First round
1999–00	3	2ª B	4th	First round
2000–01	3	2ª B	11th	Preliminary
2001–02	3	2ª B	3rd	
2002–03	3	2ª B	11th	Second round
2003–04	3	2ª B	9th	
2004–05	3	2ª B	2nd	
2005–06	2	2ª	17th	First round
2006–07	2	2ª	16th	Round of 32
2007–08	2	2ª	6th	Round of 32
2008–09	2	2ª	4th	Round of 16
2009–10	2	2ª	2nd	Round of 16
2010–11	1	1ª	19th	Round of 32
2011–12	2	2ª	5th	Second round
2012–13	2	2ª	17th	Second round

Season	Tier	Division	Place	Copa del Rey
2013–14	2	2ª	22nd	Third round
2014–15	3	2ª B	4th	First round
2015–16	3	2ª B	3rd	First round
2016–17	3	2ª B	7th	Round of 32
2017–18	3	2ª B	10th	Third round
2018–19	3	2ª B	2nd	
2019–20	3	2ª B	18th	First round
2020–21	3	2ª B	4th / 3rd	
2021–22	4	2ª RFEF	5th	
2022–23	4	2ª Fed.	7th	
2023–24	4	2ª Fed.	1st	First round
2024–25	3	1ª Fed.	12th	First round
2025–26	3	1ª Fed.	9th	
2026–27	3	1ª Fed.		

- 20 seasons in La Liga
- 43 seasons in Segunda División
- 3 seasons in Primera Federación
- 18 seasons in Segunda División B
- 3 seasons in Segunda Federación/Segunda División RFEF
- 7 seasons in Tercera División

== Players ==
=== Current squad ===
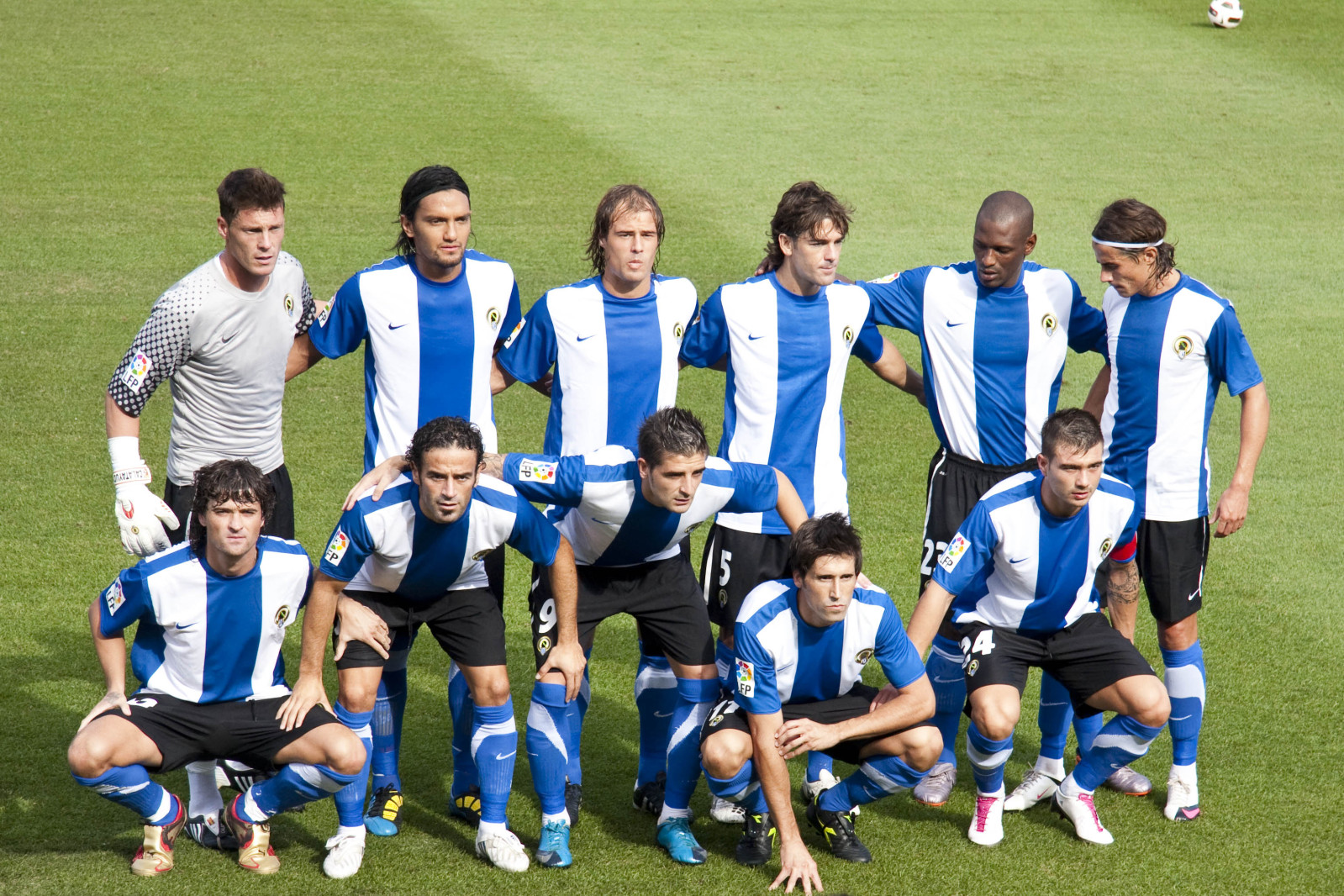
First starting lineup of the season 2010–11, its last in La Liga, against Athletic Bilbao.

As of 4 November 2026

Note: Flags indicate national team as defined under FIFA eligibility rules; some limited exceptions apply. Players may hold more than one non-FIFA nationality.

No.	Pos.	Nation	Player
1	GK	ESP	Carlos Abad
2	DF	ESP	Samu Vázquez
3	DF	ESP	David López
4	DF	ESP	Javier Rentero
5	DF	ESP	Rubén Cantero
6	MF	ESP	Roger Colomina
7	FW	GHA	Isaac Obeng
8	MF	ESP	Manu Rico
9	FW	ESP	Alberto Toril
10	MF	ESP	Oriol Soldevila
11	FW	ESP	Álex Jiménez
12	MF	FRA	Rafaël De Palmas
13	GK	SLO	Alessandro Blazic

No.	Pos.	Nation	Player
14	MF	CMR	Nassourou Ben Hamed
15	DF	ESP	Yago Cantero
16	MF	ESP	Aitor Gismera
17	FW	ESP	Antoñín (on loan from Korona Kielce)
18	MF	ESP	Alejandro Fidalgo
19	FW	ESP	Fran Sol
20	MF	ESP	Andy Escudero
21	DF	ESP	Jorge Galvañ
22	FW	ESP	Víctor Narro (on loan from Sampdoria)
23	DF	ESP	Javi Jiménez
24	DF	ESP	Miki Bosch
37	MF	ALG	Mehdi Puch

=== Reserve team ===
Note: Flags indicate national team as defined under FIFA eligibility rules; some limited exceptions apply. Players may hold more than one non-FIFA nationality.

No.	Pos.	Nation	Player
26	MF	ESP	Guti
27	MF	ESP	Pepe Traoré

No.	Pos.	Nation	Player
28	MF	ESP	Javier Valverde
31	FW	ALG	Hamza Abdelilah

=== Out of loan ===
Note: Flags indicate national team as defined under FIFA eligibility rules; some limited exceptions apply. Players may hold more than one non-FIFA nationality.

No.	Pos.	Nation	Player

== Former coaches ==
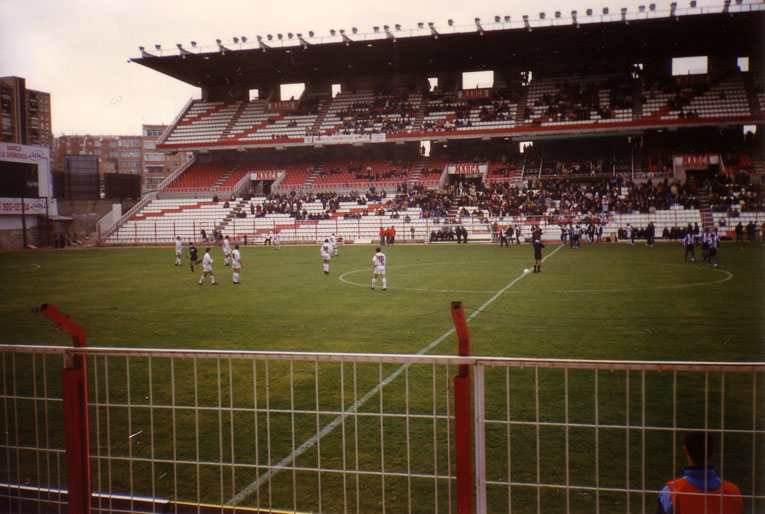
Rayo Vallecano vs. Hércules

- (Spain) (England) Alejandro Finning (1930–31)
- (England) Walter Harris (1931–33)
- (Hungary) Lippo Hertzka (1932–34)
- (Spain) Manuel Suárez (1933–36)
- (Spain) Luis Surruca (1939)
- (Spain) Francisco Gamborena (1939–40)
- (Spain) José Quirante (1939–40)
- (Spain) Manuel Olivares (1940–42)
- (Spain) Teodoro Mauri (1941–42)
- (Spain) Manuel Macià (1943–44)
- (Spain) Francisco Pagaza (1944–46)
- (Spain) Luis Urquiri (1945–48)
- (Spain) Gaspar Rubio (1948–50)
- (Spain) Antonio Bonet (1950–51)
- (Spain) Mundo (1951–52)
- (Spain) Gaspar Rubio (1952–53)
- (Spain) Julián de la Riva (1952–53)
- (Spain) José Manuel Llopis (1952–53)
- (Spain) Pina (1952–53)
- (Spain) Amadeo Sánchez (1953–54)
- (Spain) Patricio Caicedo (1954–56)
- (Spain) José Iraragorri (1955–56)
- (Spain) Amadeo Sánchez (1956–57)
- (Spain) Ricardo Gallart (1957–58)
- (Spain) Manuel Echezarreta (1958–59)
- (Spain) Ramonzuelo (interim) (1959)
- (Spain) José Valdor Sierra (1958–59)
- (Spain) Álvaro Pérez (1959–60)
- (Spain) Satur Grech (1960–61)
- (Spain) Diego Lozano (1961–62)
- (Spain) Carlos Iturraspe (1961–63)
- (Spain) José Bermúdez (1962–65)
- (Spain) Pepe Millán (1964–65)
- (Spain) Luis Belló (1965–66)
- (Spain) Vicente Dauder (1966–67)
- (Spain) Eduardo Toba (1966–68)
- (Uruguay) Sergio Rodríguez (1967–68)
- (Spain) Antoni Ramallets (1967–68)
- (Spain) Álvaro (1968–69)
- (Spain) Luis Ortega (1968–69)
- (Spain) Manolet (1968–69)
- (Spain) César Rodríguez (1969–71)
- (Spain) Miguel González (1970–71)
- (Hungary) Sandor Kocsis (1970–71)
- (Spain) Ignacio Eizaguirre (1971–72)
- (Spain) Loves (interim) (1971–72)
- (Spain) Pepe Valera (1971–72)
- (Hungary) Janos Kalmar (1972–73)
- (Spain) Arsenio Iglesias (1973–77)
- (Argentina) Felipe Mesones (1977–78)
- (Spain) Benito Joanet (1977–80)
- (Spain) Koldo Aguirre (1979–82)
- (Spain) Paquito García (1982–83)
- (Paraguay) Humberto Núñez (interim) (1982–83)
- (Spain) Pachín (1982–84)
- (Paraguay) Humberto Núñez (interim) (1983–84)
- (Uruguay) Carlos Jurado (1983–85)
- (Paraguay) Humberto Núñez (interim) (1984–85)
- (Spain) Antoni Torres (1984–86)
- (Spain) Manolo Villanova (1985–86)
- (Spain) Alberto Ormaetxea (1986–87)
- (Spain) José Luis García Traid (1986–87)
- (Spain) Pepe Rivera (1986–88)
- (Spain) Benito Joanet (1987–88)
- (Spain) Pepe Martínez (1988–89)
- (France) Marcel Domingo (1988–89)
- (Spain) Moncho (1989–90)
- (Spain) Juan Antonio Carcelén (1989–90)
- (Spain) José Víctor Rodríguez (1990–91)
- (Spain) Vicente Campillo (1991–92)
- (Spain) Quique Hernández (1992–94)
- (Argentina) Felipe Mesones (1994–95)
- (Paraguay) Humberto Núñez (interim) (1995–96)
- (Spain) Manolo Jiménez (1994–96)
- (Federal Republic of Yugoslavia) Ivan Brzić (1996–97)
- (Spain) Quique Hernández (1996–98)
- (Spain) David Vidal (1997–98)
- (Argentina) Sergio Egea (1998–99)
- (Spain) Periko Alonso (1998–99)
- (Spain) Manolo Jiménez (1998–2000)
- (Spain) Teo Rastrojo & Vicente Russo (1999–2000)
- (Spain) Miquel Corominas (2000–01)
- (Spain) Joaquín Carbonell (2000–01)
- (Spain) Álvaro Pérez (2001–02)
- (Spain) Felipe Miñambres & Ernesto Llobregat (2001–02)
- (Spain) Felipe Miñambres (2002–03)
- (Serbia) Josip Višnjić (2002–03)
- (Spain) José Carlos Granero (2003–05)
- (Spain) Javier Subirats (interim) (2004–05)
- (Spain) Juan Carlos Mandiá (2004–06)
- (Spain) Paquito Escudero (interim) (2005–06)
- (Spain) José Bordalás (2005–07)
- (Spain) Josu Uribe (2006–07)
- (Spain) Paquito Escudero (2006–07)
- (Spain) Andoni Goikoetxea (2007–08)
- (Spain) Juan Carlos Mandiá (2008–09)
- (Spain) Esteban Vigo (2009–2011)
- (Serbia) Miroslav Đukić (2011)
- (Spain) Juan Carlos Mandiá (2011–2012)
- (Spain) Quique Hernández (2012–2014)
- (Serbia) Slaviša Jokanović (2014)
- (Spain) Pacheta (2014–2015)
- (Spain) Manolo Herrero (2015–2016)
- (Spain) Vicente Mir (2016)
- (Spain) Luis Tevenet (2016–2017)
- (Spain) Carlos Luque (2017)
- (Argentina) Gustavo Siviero (2017)
- (Spain) Claudio Barragán (2017–2018)
- (Serbia) Josip Višnjić (2018)
- (Spain) Lluís Planagumà (2018–2019)
- (Spain) Luis Vegar (interim) (2019)
- (Spain) Jesús Muñoz (2019)
- (Spain) Vicente Mir (2019–2020)

== Supporters ==
=== Rivalries ===
The rival team is Elche, representing the two main cities of the Alicante province which are only 21 kilometres apart. The two contest the Alicante Province Derby or the Costa Blanca Derby.

Hércules' other main rival is Valencia. This match is the regional derby par excellence.

For years, the main rival has been Alicante, the leading club in the Alicante province, with which Hercules has shared the stadium and division for many years, leading to violent clashes between fans and players. Since their bankruptcy in 2012, their traditions are continued by CFI Alicante.

The other Valencian rivalry is with the Castellón, the other provincial capital of the Valencian Community.

Another rival team of Hercules is the Real Murcia, due to the proximity of both cities.

=== Friendships ===
With fans of Iraklis, since 2003, fans of both teams formed a friendship through the Internet, because "Iraklis" is a Greek name for "Hercules", the Roman name for Heracles, the Greek god of strength. There is even a Hércules supporters club that bears the name Iraklis, in honor of their friendship.

They also have a newly formed partnership with Scottish football club St Johnstone.

== See also ==
- Hércules CF B
- Ciudad de Alicante Trophy
