= CA Zamora =

Association football club in Spain

Atlético Zamora
- Full name: Club Atlético Zamora
- Founded: 6 January 1943; 83 years ago
- Ground: Anexo Ruta de la Plata, Zamora, Castile and León, Spain
- Capacity: 2,000
- President: Tomás Fernández Calvo
- Head coach: Ángel Fernández
- League: Primera Provincial – Zamora
- 2025–26: Primera Provincial – Zamora, 14th of 15
Home colours	Away colours

Club Atlético Zamora is a Spanish football team based in Zamora in the autonomous community of Castile and León. Founded in 1943, they play in the Primera Provincial – Zamora, holding home matches at the Campo Anexo Ruta de la Plata.

== History ==
Founded on 6 January 1943, Atlético Zamora was invited to play their inaugural season in the 1943–44 Tercera División, but gave up their place to SD Ponferradina. In 1964, they disappeared due to debts, but Antonio Fernández Carbajo refounded the club in 1972; in the meantime, Zamora CF was founded in 1968 and became the city's main club.

== Season to season ==
Season	Tier	Division	Place	Copa del Rey
1943–44	4	1ª Reg.		
1944–45	4	3ª	5th	
1945–46	3	3ª	8th	
1946–47	3	3ª	8th	
1947–48	3	3ª	6th	Third round
1948–49	3	3ª	14th	First round
1949–50	3	3ª	12th	
1950–51	3	3ª	1st	
1951–52	3	3ª	6th	
1952–53	3	3ª	8th	
1953–54	3	3ª	6th	
1954–55	3	3ª	6th	
1955–56	3	3ª	4th	
1956–57	3	3ª	2nd	
1957–58	3	3ª	4th	
1958–59	3	3ª	6th	
1959–60	3	3ª	5th	
1960–61	3	3ª	12th	
1961–62	3	3ª	15th	
1962–1975	DNP			

Season	Tier	Division	Place	Copa del Rey
1975–76	5	1ª Reg.	7th	
1976–77	5	1ª Reg.	1st	
1977–78	5	Reg. Pref.	19th	
1978–79	6	1ª Reg.	3rd	
1979–80	DNP			
1980–81	DNP			
1981–82	6	1ª Reg.	2nd	
1982–83	5	Reg. Pref.	15th	
1983–84	5	Reg. Pref.	12th	
1984–85	5	Reg. Pref.	18th	
1985–86	6	1ª Reg.	1st	
1986–87	5	Reg. Pref.	12th	
1987–88	5	Reg. Pref.	14th	
1988–89	5	Reg. Pref.	12th	
1989–90	5	Reg. Pref.	15th	
1990–91	DNP			
1991–92	6	1ª Reg.	1st	
1992–93	5	Reg. Pref.	11th	
1993–94	5	Reg. Pref.	17th	
1994–95	6	1ª Reg.	1st	

Season	Tier	Division	Place	Copa del Rey
1995–96	5	Reg. Pref.	15th	
1996–97	6	1ª Reg.	1st	
1997–98	5	Reg. Pref.	9th	
1998–99	5	Reg. Pref.	9th	
1999–2000	5	1ª Reg.	10th	
2000–01	5	1ª Reg.	8th	
2001–02	5	1ª Reg.	11th	
2002–03	5	1ª Reg.	18th	
2003–04	6	1ª Prov.	1st	
2004–05	6	1ª Prov.	2nd	
2005–06	6	1ª Prov.	2nd	
2006–07	5	1ª Reg.	18th	
2007–08	6	1ª Prov.	11th	
2008–09	7	2ª Prov.	1st	
2009–10	6	1ª Prov.	11th	
2010–11	6	1ª Prov.	10th	
2011–12	6	1ª Prov.	14th	
2012–13	7	2ª Prov.	5th	
2013–14	7	2ª Prov.	3rd	
2014–15	6	1ª Prov.	9th	

Season	Tier	Division	Place	Copa del Rey
2015–16	6	1ª Prov.	12th	
2016–17	6	1ª Prov.	13th	
2017–18	6	1ª Prov.	14th	
2018–19	6	1ª Prov.	10th	
2019–20	6	1ª Prov.	12th	
2020–21	DNP			
2021–22	7	1ª Prov.	14th	
2022–23	7	1ª Prov.	10th	
2023–24	7	1ª Prov.	10th	
2024–25	7	1ª Prov.	18th	
2025–26	7	1ª Prov.		

- 18 seasons in Tercera División
