= CF Tárrega =

Association football club in Spain

Tárrega
- Full name: Club de Fútbol Tárrega
- Founded: 1914
- Dissolved: 1954
- 1953–54: Primera Regional, 17th of 18 (relegated)
Home colours

Club de Fútbol Tárrega was a Catalan Spanish football team based in Tàrrega, in the autonomous community of Catalonia. Founded in 1914, they last played in Primera Regional Catalana before being dissolved in 1954.

== History ==
Founded in 1914 as Tàrrega Football Club, the club was renamed Tàrrega Sport Club in 1928. Renamed to Club de Fútbol Tárrega in 1941, the club first reached the Tercera División in 1950. Relegated three years later, the club was dissolved in 1954. In 1957, UE Tàrrega was created.

== Seasons ==
Season	Tier	Division	Place	Copa del Rey
1939–40	6	2ª Reg. P.	7th	
1940–41	6	2ª Reg. P.	4th	
1941–42	5	2ª Reg. P.	4th	
1942–43	5	2ª Reg. P.	3rd	
1943–44	6	2ª Reg. P.	1st	
1944–45	6	2ª Reg. P.	3rd	
1945–46	5	1ª Reg. B	6th	
1946–47	6	2ª Reg.	2nd	

Season	Tier	Division	Place	Copa del Rey
1947–48	4	1ª Reg. A	2nd	
1948–49	4	1ª Reg. A	4th	
1949–50	4	1ª Reg. A	3rd	
1950–51	3	3ª	16th	
1951–52	3	3ª	14th	
1952–53	3	3ª	18th	
1953–54	4	1ª Reg.	17th	

- 3 seasons in Tercera División
