= CD Calatayud =

Association football club in Spain

Calatayud
- Full name: Club Deportivo Calatayud
- Founded: 1923
- Dissolved: 2024
- Ground: Municipal de San Íñigo, Calatayud, Aragon, Spain
- Capacity: 2,000
- President: Ángel Lassa Moreno
- Head coach: Juan Antonio Giménez Serrano
- 2023–24: Segunda Regional – Group 3, Subgroup 2, 10th of 11
Home colours	Away colours

Club Deportivo Calatayud is a Spanish football team based in Calatayud, in the autonomous community of Aragon. Founded in 1923, they play in , holding home games at Estadio Municipal de San Íñigo, with a capacity of 2,000 people.

== Season to season ==
Season	Tier	Division	Place	Copa del Rey
1929–1947	—	Regional	—	
1947–48	4	1ª Reg.	5th	
1948–49	4	1ª Reg.	1st	
1949–50	3	3ª	5th	
1950–51	3	3ª	13th	
1951–52	3	3ª	9th	
1952–53	3	3ª	15th	
1953–54	3	3ª	16th	
1954–55	3	3ª	4th	
1955–56	3	3ª	3rd	
1956–57	3	3ª	4th	
1957–58	3	3ª	10th	
1958–59	3	3ª	3rd	
1959–60	3	3ª	12th	
1960–61	3	3ª	16th	
1961–62	4	1ª Reg.	1st	
1962–63	3	3ª	4th	
1963–64	3	3ª	3rd	
1964–65	3	3ª	7th	
1965–66	DNP			

Season	Tier	Division	Place	Copa del Rey
1966–67	DNP			
1967–68	5	2ª Reg.	3rd	
1968–69	5	1ª Reg.	6th	
1969–70	5	1ª Reg.	1st	
1970–71	4	Reg. Pref.	4th	
1971–72	4	Reg. Pref.	5th	
1972–73	4	Reg. Pref.	5th	
1973–74	4	Reg. Pref.	7th	
1974–75	4	Reg. Pref.	19th	
1975–76	5	1ª Reg.	6th	
1976–77	5	1ª Reg.	10th	
1977–78	6	1ª Reg.	14th	
1978–79	6	1ª Reg.	1st	
1979–80	5	Reg. Pref.	4th	
1980–81	5	Reg. Pref.	4th	
1981–82	5	Reg. Pref.	12th	
1982–83	5	Reg. Pref.	5th	
1983–84	5	Reg. Pref.	12th	
1984–85	5	Reg. Pref.	2nd	
1985–86	5	Reg. Pref.	1st	

Season	Tier	Division	Place	Copa del Rey
1986–87	4	3ª	14th	
1987–88	4	3ª	6th	
1988–89	4	3ª	10th	
1989–90	4	3ª	13th	
1990–91	4	3ª	4th	
1991–92	4	3ª	19th	First round
1992–93	5	Reg. Pref.	15th	
1993–2022	DNP			
2022–23	8	2ª Reg.	10th	
2023–24	8	2ª Reg.	10th	

- 21 seasons in Tercera División
