= CD Yeclano =

Spanish football team

Yeclano
- Full name: Club Deportivo Yeclano
- Founded: 1940
- Dissolved: 1958
- Ground: La Constitución, Yecla, Murcia, Spain
- Capacity: 4,000

Club Deportivo Yeclano was a Spanish football team based in Yecla, in the autonomous community of Murcia. Founded in 1940, it began to play official competitions since 1943 at Estadio de La Constitución. It was promoted to Tercera Division in the 1952–53 campaign and the team was dissolved after the 1957–58 season.

== Season to season ==
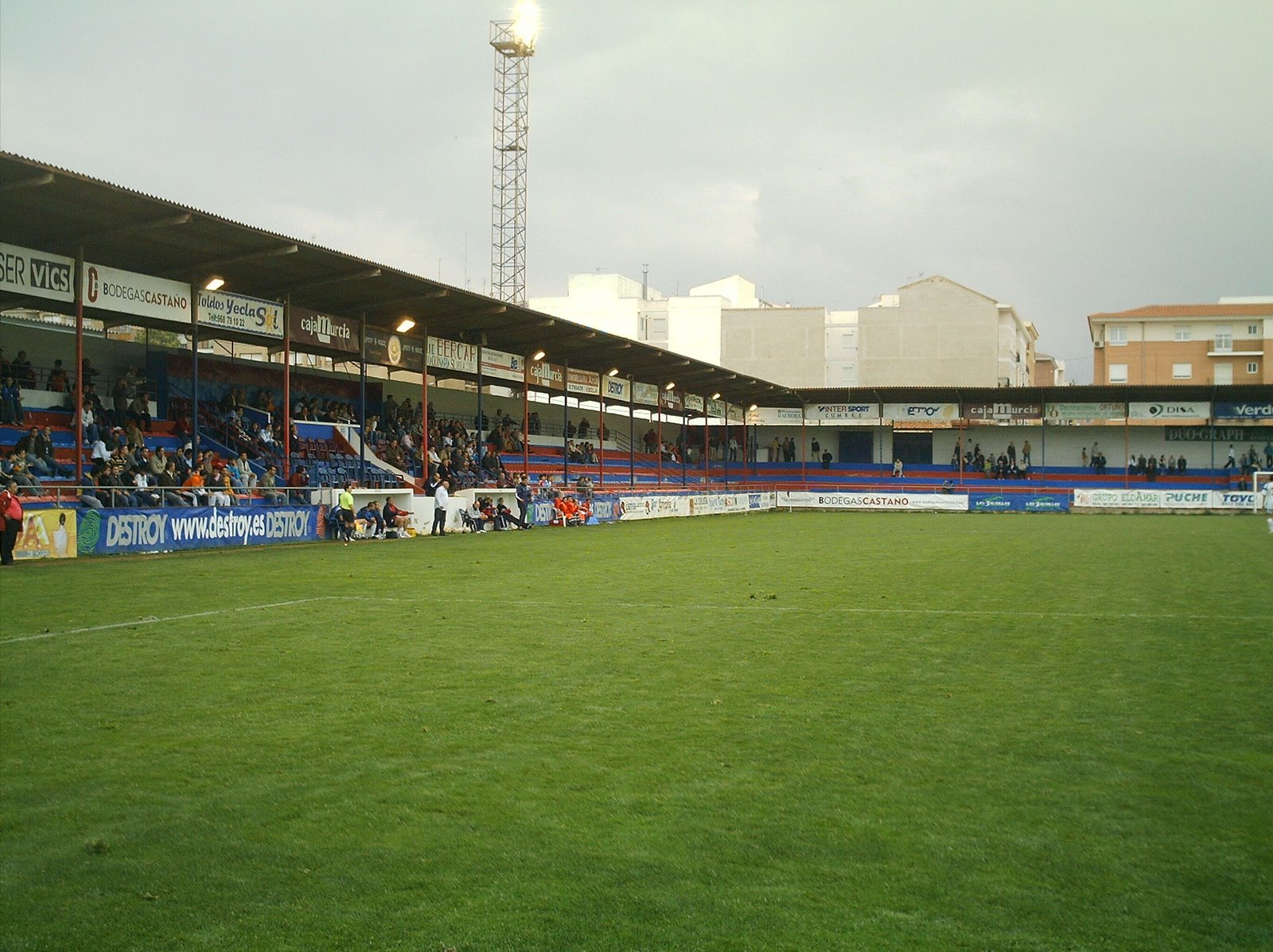
Estadio La Constitución

Season	Tier	Division	Place	Copa del Rey
1943–44	5	2ª Reg.	1st	
1944–45	4	1ª Reg.	1st	
1945–46	4	1ª Reg.	3rd	
1946–47	4	1ª Reg.	3rd	
1947–48	4	1ª Reg.	4th	
1948–49	DNP			
1949–50	4	1ª Reg.	6th	
1950–51	4	1ª Reg.	(R)	

Season	Tier	Division	Place	Copa del Rey
1951–52	4	1ª Reg.	2nd	
1952–53	4	1ª Reg.	1st	
1953–54	3	3ª	7th	
1954–55	3	3ª	5th	
1955–56	3	3ª	9th	
1956–57	3	3ª	12th	
1957–58	3	3ª	(R)	

- 5 seasons in Tercera División
