= CE Manacor =

Football team

Manacor
- Full name: Club Esportiu Manacor
- Nicknames: Manacorins, blanc-i-vermells
- Founded: 23 June 1923
- Ground: Na Capellera, Manacor; Balearic Islands, Spain
- Capacity: 4,000
- President: Pere Mateu Grimalt
- Head coach: Andrés Vázquez
- League: Tercera Federación – Group 11
- 2025–26: Tercera Federación – Group 11, 2nd of 18
- Website: http://www.cemanacor.com/
Home colours	Away colours

Club Esportiu Manacor is a Spanish football team based in Manacor, Mallorca, Balearic Islands. Founded in 1923, its first team plays in the Tercera Federación – Group 11, the fifth tier of Spanish football. Moreover, Manacor's first women's team is active in the Femenina Autonòmica, and the club has around a dozen of teams in its youth academy. The club's ground is the Estadi de Na Capellera, located in the same city, holding 4,000 spectators.

The highest category in which Manacor has played is the extinct Segunda División B, doing so during five seasons divided over the 20th century. Moreover, the club has participated in around 60 editions of the Tercera División/Tercera Federación.

== History ==
=== Name evolution ===
- Futbol Club Manacor (1923-1934)
- Club Deportivo Nacional de Manacor (1934-1935)
- Racing Club de Manacor (1935-1937)
- Club Deportivo Manacor (1937-present) (Note: Up until this day, the club is registered by the last name in the Football Federation of the Balearic Islands, even though the club has been using the Catalan name, "Club Esportiu Manacor", for years in all official communication.)

=== Beginnings of football in Manacor ===
In 1908, football arrived to Manacor for the first time with the creation of Foot-Ballista Club Manacor, related to the local agricultural syndicate. Later, a new club was founded after splitting from the first club: Foot-Ballista Club Alfonso XII, but both clubs disappeared one year later. The members and players of both teams created Club Manacor de Foot-Ball in 1909, a club that would be active for a decade, but also ended up disappearing.

=== Foundation of CE Manacor (1923) ===
On 23 June 2023 in the Teatre Principal in Manacor, a new club was founded: Futbol Club Manacor, which became the new representative club of the homonymous city and registered at the Catalan Football Federation. Quickly, Manacor would turn into one of the referents of football in the Part Forana (the parts of Mallorca outside of Palma), together with CE Constància from Inca.

=== 1920s. Runners-up in the Primera Categoria and a new stadium ===
In the 1924-25 season, Manacor debuted in the Primera Categoria of the regional Campionat de Mallorca de futbol after one season of absence due to the lack of a stadium that complied with the competition rules. One season later, the club obtained the second place after the excision of many teams from the competition. The 1925-26 final was played against RS Alfons XIII FC (currently RCD Mallorca) in Felanitx and was won by the Palma team. It would be the only second place that Manacor would achieve in this competition.

During the second celebration of Easter in 1925, the Estadi de Na Capellera was inaugurated with a friendly against RS Alfonso XIII FC. Interestingly, Manacor played with a blue-red shirt during its first years, imitating FC Barcelona, a team that had many followers on the island.

=== 1930s. Crisis, refoundations and war ===
Around 1930, Manacor started to suffer severe financial problems, leading to the club being relegated, the stadium being sold in August 1934, and the entity disappearing a few days later. That same year, Club Deportivo Nacional de Manacor was founded, formed by ex-players of the recently disappeared club. The new club changed its colours, which became red and white vertical stripes and black socks (which turned blue in the 1970s), while they maintained the stadium of the previous club. In the beginning of 1935, Nacional changed its name to Racing Club de Manacor.

Initially, it seemed like Racing would be able to return to the heights that FC Manacor had reached before, but the outbreak of the Spanish Civil War caused the temporary complete paralysation of the club's activities. In the beginnings of 1937, Francoist directors took over the club and refounded it as Club Deportivo Manacor, incorporating the base of players of Racing.

=== 1940s. Promotion to the Tercera División ===
After one season in the Segunda Regional, Manacor achieved promotion to the Primera Regional in 1940-41. The club maintained that category with ease and was finished first on three occasions: 1944-45, 1945-46, and 1948-49, achieving promotion to the Tercera División after the third championship.

=== 1950s. Consolidation and almost another promotion ===
With the promotion to the Tercera División, Manacor left the regional competitions behind for a long time and started to play against Catalan and Valencian teams. The fourth place, obtained in the debut season, placed Manacor above renowned Mallorcan teams like CE Atlètic Balears or CE Constància, becoming the temporary second-strongest team on the island (behind CD Mallorca, active in the Segunda División).

During the rest of the 1950s, Manacor usually finished in a high position, even being close to winning the competition during some seasons. The best season of the decade was 1959-60, in which Manacor won the league after an agonic season finale. Manacor played the play-off final for promotion to the Segunda División against Hércules CF and lost 2–0. The club would not be that close to promotion to the second tier again.

==== Championship of the Copa Uruguay (1958) ====
Parallel to the Tercera División, Manacor participated in the Copa Uruguay, an important Mallorcan tournament during the 1950s and 1960s. The club won the 1957-58 edition after surviving the group phase, eliminating CE Atlètic Balears in the semi-final (2-2, 1-1, and 6-2), and beating CE Alaró in the final (4-1).

=== 1960s and 1970s. Many promotions and relegations ===
During the 1960s, Manacor only played in the Tercera División, but without participating in the promotion playoffs. In 1970, the club got relegated to the Primera Regional, a competition that would turn into the Regional Preferente two years later. The 1970s are characterised by the many promotions and relegations of Manacor. Successively, the club was relegated (1970), promoted (1973), relegated (1974), promoted (1978), relegated (1979), and finally promoted (1980). The 1979-80 season would be Manacor's last one in the regional categories during the 20th century.

=== 1980s and 1990s. The glory era ===
During the 1980s, Manacor aimed for promotion to the newly created Segunda División B for the first time. In the 1983-84 season, Manacor achieved promotion to the Segunda B despite not being crowned champion. The next season would, in a way, be the most successful season in the club's history, given that Manacor stayed up in the new third division, the only time it would achieve that goal. In 1985-86, however, the club was relegated to the Tercera División.

During the 1990s, Manacor won two championships of the Tercera División: in 1989-90 and in 1992-93. Both titles had similar outcomes: the club achieved direct promotion to the Segunda División B, but also returned to the Tercera División one year later. During these years, Manacor lived its glory era, used to fill the Estadi de Na Capellera, and was considered one of the strongest teams of the Part Forana.

=== 2000s and 2010s. Many more seasons in the Tercera División ===
In the 21st century, Manacor confirmed its profile as a 'classic' team in the Tercera División, accumulating 16 seasons more during the first two decades. During the first years of the century, it seemed like the club could return to the Segunda División B, but was eliminated from the promotion playoffs every time it participated and dropped down to the Regional Preferente in 2009.

Even though the relegation had a profound impact on the club, it also led to the start of a new dynamic. With a strong team, Manacor was crowned champions twice and, subsequently, achieved two promotions, one to the Tercera División (2010) and one to the Segunda División B (2011). However, the club failed to stay up and returned to the Tercera División after one season. Between 2015 and 2017, Manacor competed in the Regional Preferente, playing all other seasons of the 2010s in the Tercera.

=== 2020s. Playoffs and the Copa del Rey ===
In the 2020-21 season, affected severely by the COVID-19 pandemic, Manacor aimed for promotion for the first time since returning to the Tercera División in 2017. The club finished fourth in the first phase and third in the second phase, missing out on the promotion play-offs by one point.

Before the start of 2021-22, the Tercera División was replaced by the Tercera Federación and turned into the fifth tier of Spanish football. In this way, Manacor debuted in a new competition, even though it was practically a continuation of the previous one. Regarding the results, Manacor had a better season than the previous one, finishing in second place. In the play-off for promotion to the Segunda Federación, Manacor survived the regional phase, eliminating CE Llosetí (4-1) and UE Poblera (2-1). In the national phase, however, the club lost to AD Alcorcón B from Madrid (0-2).

The 2022-23 season would be another positive one, but with the same outcome. In a close title race with CE Andratx, SE Penya Independent, and UE Poblera, Manacor finished second, balanced on points with Andratx. In the regional play-off phase, the club lost to CE Santanyí in the first round (1-0 in Santanyí and 1-1 in Manacor) and had to continue in the Tercera Federación.

In 2023-24, Manacor qualified for the play-off for promotion to the Segunda Federación for the third consecutive time, but this time after finishing fifth in the regular league. For the second time in a row, the club was knocked out of the play-off in the first round, this time by RCD Mallorca B (1-0 in Manacor and 5-1 in Palma).

==== Two participations in the Copa del Rey ====
Thanks to the good classifications in the Tercera Federación in the seasons 2021-22 and 2022-23, Manacor entered the Copa del Rey in 2022-23 and 2023-24. In the first season, the club received FC Andorra from the homonymous state, a team active in the Segunda División, and lost 1–3. The second season, the Estadi de Na Capellera was visited by UD Las Palmas, a side from La Liga, and the Canarians won 0–3.

== Season to season ==
Season	Tier	Division	Place	Copa del Rey
1939–40	5	2ª Reg.	2nd	
1940–41	5	2ª Reg.	1st	
1941–42	3	1ª Reg.	2nd	
1942–43	3	1ª Reg.	6th	
1943–44	4	1ª Reg.	3rd	
1944–45	4	1ª Reg.	1st	
1945–46	4	1ª Reg.	1st	
1946–47	4	1ª Reg.	4th	
1947–48	4	1ª Reg.	3rd	
1948–49	4	1ª Reg.	1st	
1949–50	3	3ª	3rd	
1950–51	3	3ª	4th	
1951–52	3	3ª	10th	
1952–53	3	3ª	6th	
1953–54	3	3ª	8th	
1954–55	3	3ª	3rd	
1955–56	3	3ª	4th	
1956–57	3	3ª	4th	
1957–58	3	3ª	4th	
1958–59	3	3ª	4th	

Season	Tier	Division	Place	Copa del Rey
1959–60	3	3ª	1st	
1960–61	3	3ª	7th	
1961–62	3	3ª	3rd	
1962–63	3	3ª	5th	
1964–64	3	3ª	4th	
1964–65	3	3ª	7th	
1965–66	3	3ª	7th	
1966–67	3	3ª	7th	
1967–68	3	3ª	7th	
1968–69	3	3ª	13th	
1969–70	3	3ª	19th	
1970–71	4	1ª Reg.	2nd	
1971–72	4	1ª Reg.	2nd	
1972–73	4	Reg. Pref.	2nd	
1973–74	3	3ª	20th	
1974–75	4	Reg. Pref.	3rd	
1975–76	4	Reg. Pref.	11th	
1976–77	4	Reg. Pref.	10th	
1977–78	5	Reg. Pref.	4th	
1978–79	4	3ª	20th	

Season	Tier	Division	Place	Copa del Rey
1979–80	5	Reg. Pref.	1st	
1980–81	4	3ª	6th	
1981–82	4	3ª	3rd	
1982–83	4	3ª	2nd	
1983–84	4	3ª	2nd	
1984–85	3	2ª B	17th	
1985–86	3	2ª B	16th	
1986–87	4	3ª	8th	
1987–88	4	3ª	3rd	
1988–89	4	3ª	4th	
1989–90	4	3ª	1st	
1990–91	3	2ª B	19th	
1991–92	4	3ª	2nd	
1992–93	4	3ª	1st	
1993–94	3	2ª B	20th	
1994–95	4	3ª	6th	
1995–96	4	3ª	6th	
1996–97	4	3ª	4th	
1997–98	4	3ª	9th	
1998–99	4	3ª	5th	

Season	Tier	Division	Place	Copa del Rey
1999–2000	4	3ª	3rd	
2000–01	4	3ª	4th	
2001–02	4	3ª	7th	
2002–03	4	3ª	3rd	
2003–04	4	3ª	12th	
2004–05	4	3ª	2nd	
2005–06	4	3ª	10th	
2006–07	4	3ª	9th	
2007–08	4	3ª	10th	
2008–09	4	3ª	18th	
2009–10	5	Reg. Pref.	1st	
2010–11	4	3ª	1st	
2011–12	3	2ª B	19th	First round
2012–13	4	3ª	6th	
2013–14	4	3ª	10th	
2014–15	4	3ª	19th	
2015–16	5	Reg. Pref.	10th	
2016–17	5	Reg. Pref.	1st	
2017–18	4	3ª	12th	
2018–19	4	3ª	17th	

Season	Tier	Division	Place	Copa del Rey
2019–20	4	3ª	15th	
2020–21	4	3ª	4th / 3rd	
2021–22	5	3ª RFEF	2nd	
2022–23	5	3ª Fed.	2nd	First round
2023–24	5	3ª Fed.	5th	First round
2024–25	5	3ª Fed.	7th	
2025–26	5	3ª Fed.	2nd	
2026–27	5	3ª Fed.		TBD

- 5 seasons in Segunda División B
- 56 seasons in Tercera División
- 6 seasons in Tercera Federación/Tercera División RFEF
- 21 seasons in Categorías regionales

== Honours ==
- Tercera División: 1959–60, 1989–90, 1992–93, 2010–11
- Categorías Regionales: 1940–41, 1944–45, 1945–46, 1948–49, 1979–80, 2009–10, 2016–17
- Copa Uruguay: 1958

== Famous players ==
- (Spain) Toni Muñoz
- (Spain) Miguel Ángel Nadal
- (Spain) Xavi Ginard

== Stadium ==
The Estadi de Na Capellera was inaugurated in 1923 and has a capacity of 4,000 seats. The surface of the playing field is artificial grass and has a size of 105x67m.

== Hymn ==
The hymn (in Catalan) was composed by Guillem d'Efak. The lyrics are as follows:

Ara ja surt en el Camp. ¡Sí!
Ara ja surt en el Camp. ¡Sí!
Ara ja surt en el Camp
el Manacor que és el més bo.

¡Hip, Hip, Hip! El nostro equip
és l'equip de tots
de tots aquells que volen
a ser manacorins.

Tant si a nascut aquí
o allà deçà la Mar
l'equip del Manacor
mos fa germans.

Manacor, Manacor,
el bon manacorí
t'estima de bon cor.

Manacor, Manacor,
tant si guanya
com si perd
el Manacor és més bo!

Manacor, és més bo!
Manacor, és més bo!
Manacor, és més bo!

== Trivia ==
- The most famous supporter of Manacor is the tennis player Rafael Nadal, born in Manacor and the nephew of Miquel Àngel Nadal, ex-player of Manacor, RCD Mallorca, and FC Barcelona, among others.

== See also ==
- FC Inter Manacor, farm team

== Bibliography ==
- Carvajal, Albert; Gomila, Antoni; Tugores, Antoni (2023). Passió pel futbol a Manacor (1908-2023) [Passion for football in Manacor (1908-2023)] (in Catalan). Manacor: Purpurina editorial. ISBN 978-84-09-55338-9. DL PM 01395-2023.
- Martínez Sanz, María del Mar; Llompart Morro, María del Mar (1 August 2013). Historia del Club Deportivo Manacor [History of Club Esportiu Manacor]. Cuadernos de Fútbol (in Spanish). Vol. 46. CIHEFE. ISSN 1989-6379.
