= CD Lorca =

Spanish football club

Lorca
- Full name: Club Deportivo Lorca
- Founded: 1950
- Dissolved: 1966
- Ground: San José; Lorca, Murcia, Spain
- Capacity: 8,000
Home colours

Club Deportivo Lorca were a Spanish football club based in Lorca, in the Region of Murcia. Founded in 1950 and dissolved in 1966, they held home games at Estadio Municipal de San San José, with an 8,000-seat capacity.

== History ==
Founded in 1950 as an honour to a previous CD Lorca which existed in the city in the 1930s, the club replaced dissolved Lorca CF and spent their first year only playing friendlies, before entering the Primera Regional de Murcia in 1951. They won the league in that season, achieving promotion to Tercera División.

Lorca played 14 consecutive seasons in the third division, before suffering relegation in 1966 and subsequently folding. Three years later, CF Lorca Deportiva were founded.

== Season to season ==
Season	Tier	Division	Place	Copa del Rey
1951–52	4	1ª Reg.	1st	
1952–53	3	3ª	11th	
1953–54	3	3ª	10th	
1954–55	3	3ª	6th	
1955–56	3	3ª	6th	
1956–57	3	3ª	10th	
1957–58	3	3ª	8th	
1958–59	3	3ª	5th	

Season	Tier	Division	Place	Copa del Rey
1959–60	3	3ª	6th	
1960–61	3	3ª	7th	
1961–62	3	3ª	3rd	
1962–63	3	3ª	8th	
1963–64	3	3ª	13th	
1964–65	3	3ª	12th	
1965–66	3	3ª	16th	

- 14 seasons in Tercera División
