= Novelda CF =

Novelda
- Full name: Novelda Club de Fútbol
- Founded: 1925
- Ground: La Magdalena; Novelda, Valencian Community, Spain
- Capacity: 5,000
- President: Emad William Elgawly
- Head coach: Anselmo Serrano
- League: Primera FFCV – Group 4
- 2025–26: Primera FFCV – Group 4, 3rd of 16
| Home colours | Away colours |

Novelda Club de Fútbol is a football club based in Novelda, in the Valencian Community in Spain. The Spanish football team was founded in 1925. They play in Primera FFCV – Group 4, holding home games at Estadio La Magdalena, which has a capacity of 5,000 seats.

Novelda was initially folded on 8 June 2018 after merging with Intercity Alicante. However, the merger was not accepted by RFEF and thus, Novelda did not fold and remained in the league.

== History ==
The first football games were played in Novelda in the 1915–17. The teams consisted of students and took place during holiday breaks.

== Season to season ==
| Season | Tier | Division | Place | Copa del Rey |
|---|---|---|---|---|
| 1929–1949 | — | Regional | — | |
| 1949–50 | 4 | 1ª Reg. | 1st | |
| 1950–51 | 3 | 3ª | 10th | |
| 1951–52 | 3 | 3ª | 4th | |
| 1952–53 | 3 | 3ª | 10th | |
| 1953–54 | 3 | 3ª | 18th | |
| 1954–55 | 3 | 3ª | 8th | |
| 1955–56 | 3 | 3ª | 5th | |
| 1956–57 | 3 | 3ª | 17th | |
| 1957–58 | 3 | 3ª | 9th | |
| 1958–59 | 3 | 3ª | 6th | |
| 1959–60 | 3 | 3ª | 9th | |
| 1960–61 | 3 | 3ª | 12th | |
| 1961–62 | 3 | 3ª | 15th | |
| 1962–63 | 4 | 1ª Reg. | 17th | |
| 1963–64 | 4 | 1ª Reg. | 3rd | |
| 1964–65 | 4 | 1ª Reg. | 1st | |
| 1965–66 | 3 | 3ª | 11th | |
| 1966–67 | 3 | 3ª | 14th | |
| 1967–68 | 3 | 3ª | 5th | |

| Season | Tier | Division | Place | Copa del Rey |
|---|---|---|---|---|
| 1968–69 | 3 | 3ª | 7th | |
| 1969–70 | 3 | 3ª | 11th | First round |
| 1970–71 | 4 | 1ª Reg. | 15th | |
| 1971–72 | 4 | Reg. Pref. | 11th | |
| 1972–73 | 4 | Reg. Pref. | 18th | |
| 1973–74 | 5 | 1ª Reg. | 15th | |
| 1974–75 | 5 | 1ª Reg. | 13th | |
| 1975–76 | 5 | 1ª Reg. | 10th | |
| 1976–77 | 4 | Reg. Pref. | 7th | |
| 1977–78 | 5 | Reg. Pref. | 1st | |
| 1978–79 | 5 | Reg. Pref. | 3rd | |
| 1979–80 | 5 | Reg. Pref. | 1st | |
| 1980–81 | 4 | 3ª | 13th | |
| 1981–82 | 4 | 3ª | 14th | |
| 1982–83 | 4 | 3ª | 11th | |
| 1983–84 | 4 | 3ª | 10th | |
| 1984–85 | 4 | 3ª | 12th | |
| 1985–86 | 4 | 3ª | 14th | |
| 1986–87 | 4 | 3ª | 14th | |
| 1987–88 | 4 | 3ª | 21st | |

| Season | Tier | Division | Place | Copa del Rey |
|---|---|---|---|---|
| 1988–89 | 5 | Reg. Pref. | 20th | |
| 1989–90 | 5 | Reg. Pref. | 5th | |
| 1990–91 | 5 | Reg. Pref. | 5th | |
| 1991–92 | 5 | Reg. Pref. | 3rd | |
| 1992–93 | 5 | Reg. Pref. | 4th | |
| 1993–94 | 5 | Reg. Pref. | 2nd | |
| 1994–95 | 4 | 3ª | 3rd | |
| 1995–96 | 3 | 2ª B | 18th | Second round |
| 1996–97 | 4 | 3ª | 3rd | |
| 1997–98 | 3 | 2ª B | 18th | Third round |
| 1998–99 | 4 | 3ª | 2nd | |
| 1999–2000 | 3 | 2ª B | 16th | First round |
| 2000–01 | 3 | 2ª B | 5th | |
| 2001–02 | 3 | 2ª B | 7th | Round of 16 |
| 2002–03 | 3 | 2ª B | 15th | Round of 32 |
| 2003–04 | 3 | 2ª B | 10th | |
| 2004–05 | 3 | 2ª B | 19th | |
| 2005–06 | 4 | 3ª | 7th | |
| 2006–07 | 4 | 3ª | 5th | |
| 2007–08 | 4 | 3ª | 6th | |

| Season | Tier | Division | Place | Copa del Rey |
|---|---|---|---|---|
| 2008–09 | 4 | 3ª | 11th | |
| 2009–10 | 4 | 3ª | 3rd | |
| 2010–11 | 4 | 3ª | 3rd | |
| 2011–12 | 4 | 3ª | 8th | |
| 2012–13 | 4 | 3ª | 2nd | |
| 2013–14 | 4 | 3ª | 5th | First round |
| 2014–15 | 4 | 3ª | 3rd | |
| 2015–16 | 4 | 3ª | 7th | |
| 2016–17 | 4 | 3ª | 6th | |
| 2017–18 | 4 | 3ª | 10th | |
| 2018–19 | 4 | 3ª | 15th | |
| 2019–20 | 4 | 3ª | 9th | |
| 2020–21 | 4 | 3ª | 10th / 8th | |
| 2021–22 | 6 | Reg. Pref. | 10th | |
| 2022–23 | 6 | Reg. Pref. | 18th | |
| 2023–24 | 7 | 1ª FFCV | 5th | |
| 2024–25 | 7 | 1ª FFCV | 7th | |
| 2025–26 | 7 | 1ª FFCV | 3rd | |
| 2026–27 | 7 | 1ª FFCV | | |

- 8 seasons in Segunda División B
- 43 seasons in Tercera División

== Famous players ==
Note: this list contains players that have played at least 100 league games and/or have reached international status.

- (Nigeria) Ramon Azeez
