= CD Utrera =

Spanish association football club

Utrera
- Full name: Club Deportivo Utrera
- Founded: 1946; 1975 (refounded)
- Ground: San Juan Bosco, Utrera, Andalusia, Spain
- Capacity: 3,000
- President: (Spain) Antonio Camino Muñoz
- Head coach: (Spain) Jesús Galván
- League: Tercera Federación – Group 10
- 2025–26: Tercera Federación – Group 10, 10th of 18
- Website: cdutrera.com
Home colours	Away colours

Club Deportivo Utrera is a football club based in Utrera, Andalusia, Spain. Founded in 1946, they currently compete in Tercera Federación – Group 10, holding home matches at Estadio Municipal San Juan Bosco, which has a capacity of 3,000 spectators.

== History ==
Utrera achieved promoted to Segunda Federación, the fourth tier, in 2022.

== Season to season ==
=== Old CD Utrera ===
Season	Tier	Division	Place	Copa del Rey
1948–49	5	2ª Reg.	2nd	
1949–50	4	1ª Reg.	3rd	
1950–51	3	3ª	11th	
1951–52	3	3ª	13th	
1952–53	3	3ª	15th	
1953–54	3	3ª	14th	
1954–55	3	3ª	9th	
1955–56	3	3ª	5th	
1956–57	3	3ª	13th	
1957–58	3	3ª	2nd	
1958–59	3	3ª	9th	

Season	Tier	Division	Place	Copa del Rey
1959–60	3	3ª	13th	
1960–61	3	3ª	8th	
1961–62	3	3ª	4th	
1962–63	3	3ª	5th	
1963–64	3	3ª	9th	
1964–65	3	3ª	13th	
1965–66	3	3ª	8th	
1966–67	3	3ª	15th	
1967–68	3	3ª	13th	
1968–69	4	1ª Reg.		

=== New CD Utrera ===
Season	Tier	Division	Place	Copa del Rey
1975–76	5	1ª Reg.	16th	
1976–77	6	2ª Reg.		
1977–78	7	2ª Reg.		
1978–79	7	2ª Reg.	1st	
1979–80	6	1ª Reg.	5th	
1980–81	5	Reg. Pref.	8th	
1981–82	5	Reg. Pref.	12th	
1982–83	5	Reg. Pref.	13th	
1983–84	5	Reg. Pref.	8th	
1984–85	5	Reg. Pref.	1st	
1985–86	4	3ª	3rd	Second round
1986–87	4	3ª	6th	
1987–88	4	3ª	12th	
1988–89	4	3ª	1st	
1989–90	3	2ª B	18th	
1990–91	4	3ª	19th	First round
1991–92	5	Reg. Pref.	3rd	
1992–93	5	Reg. Pref.	2nd	
1993–94	5	Reg. Pref.	1st	
1994–95	4	3ª	2nd	

Season	Tier	Division	Place	Copa del Rey
1995–96	3	2ª B	20th	First round
1996–97	4	3ª	16th	
1997–98	4	3ª	8th	
1998–99	4	3ª	18th	
1999–2000	5	Reg. Pref.	4th	
2000–01	5	Reg. Pref.	5th	
2001–02	5	Reg. Pref.	2nd	
2002–03	5	Reg. Pref.	1st	
2003–04	5	Reg. Pref.	1st	
2004–05	5	1ª And.	6th	
2005–06	5	1ª And.	15th	
2006–07	5	1ª And.	5th	
2007–08	5	1ª And.	4th	
2008–09	5	1ª And.	5th	
2009–10	5	1ª And.	2nd	
2010–11	5	1ª And.	5th	
2011–12	5	1ª And.	6th	
2012–13	5	1ª And.	5th	
2013–14	5	1ª And.	5th	
2014–15	5	1ª And.	2nd	

Season	Tier	Division	Place	Copa del Rey
2015–16	4	3ª	13th	
2016–17	4	3ª	10th	
2017–18	4	3ª	13th	
2018–19	4	3ª	3rd	
2019–20	4	3ª	4th	
2020–21	4	3ª	5th / 2nd	
2021–22	5	3ª RFEF	2nd	
2022–23	4	2ª Fed.	18th	First round
2023–24	5	3ª Fed.	8th	
2024–25	5	3ª Fed.	3rd	
2025–26	5	3ª Fed.	10th	
2026–27	5	3ª Fed.		

- 2 seasons in Segunda División B
- 1 season in Segunda Federación
- 33 seasons in Tercera División
- 5 seasons in Tercera Federación/Tercera División RFEF

== Honours ==
- Tercera División: 1988–89
