= CD Binéfar =

Association football club in Spain

Binéfar
- Full name: Club Deportivo Binéfar
- Founded: 1922; 104 years ago
- Ground: Los Olmos, Binéfar, Aragon, Spain
- Capacity: 1,250
- President: (Spain) Javier Murillo
- Head coach: (Spain) David Giménez
- League: Tercera Federación – Group 17
- 2025–26: Tercera Federación – Group 17, 7th of 18
Home colours	Away colours

Club Deportivo Binéfar is a Spanish football team based in Binéfar, in the autonomous community of Aragon. Founded in 1922 it plays in Tercera Federación – Group 17, holding home matches at Campo de Deportes de los Olmos, with a capacity of 1,250 seats.

== History ==
In 1922, a group of friends having football as their hobby decided to create a club to give a more official character to their games.

In the 2018–19 season the club finished 11th in the Tercera División, Group 17.

== Season to season ==
Season	Tier	Division	Place	Copa del Rey
1948–49	4	1ª Reg.	1st	
1949–50	4	1ª Reg.	1st	
1950–51	3	3ª	8th	
1951–52	3	3ª	13th	
1952–53	3	3ª	10th	
1953–54	3	3ª	19th	
1954–55	3	3ª	2nd	
1955–56	3	3ª	5th	
1956–57	3	3ª	2nd	
1957–58	3	3ª	11th	
1958–59	3	3ª	7th	
1959–60	3	3ª	9th	
1960–61	4	1ª Reg.	5th	
1961–62	DNP			
1962–63	4	1ª Reg.	4th	
1963–64	DNP			
1964–65	DNP			
1965–66	4	1ª Reg.	1st	
1966–67	3	3ª	13th	
1967–68	3	3ª	8th	

Season	Tier	Division	Place	Copa del Rey
1968–69	3	3ª	16th	
1969–70	3	3ª	18th	First round
1970–71	4	Reg. Pref.	2nd	
1971–72	4	Reg. Pref.	4th	
1972–73	4	Reg. Pref.	3rd	
1973–74	4	Reg. Pref.	5th	
1974–75	4	Reg. Pref.	9th	
1975–76	4	Reg. Pref.	20th	
1976–77	5	1ª Reg.	5th	
1977–78	5	Reg. Pref.	3rd	
1978–79	4	Reg. Pref.	1st	
1979–80	4	3ª	9th	First round
1980–81	4	3ª	1st	Second round
1981–82	4	3ª	1st	Third round
1982–83	3	2ª B	17th	First round
1983–84	3	2ª B	7th	
1984–85	3	2ª B	8th	First round
1985–86	3	2ª B	12th	Second round
1986–87	4	3ª	4th	
1987–88	4	3ª	1st	Second round

Season	Tier	Division	Place	Copa del Rey
1988–89	3	2ª B	8th	
1989–90	3	2ª B	9th	
1990–91	3	2ª B	14th	Third round
1991–92	3	2ª B	19th	Third round
1992–93	4	3ª	7th	First round
1993–94	4	3ª	7th	
1994–95	4	3ª	7th	
1995–96	4	3ª	12th	
1996–97	4	3ª	1st	
1997–98	4	3ª	1st	Second round
1998–99	3	2ª B	15th	
1999–2000	3	2ª B	14th	
2000–01	3	2ª B	16th	
2001–02	3	2ª B	15th	
2002–03	3	2ª B	20th	
2003–04	4	3ª	2nd	
2004–05	4	3ª	15th	
2005–06	4	3ª	10th	
2006–07	4	3ª	13th	
2007–08	4	3ª	13th	

Season	Tier	Division	Place	Copa del Rey
2008–09	4	3ª	18th	
2009–10	5	Reg. Pref.	1st	
2010–11	4	3ª	4th	
2011–12	4	3ª	9th	
2012–13	4	3ª	20th	
2013–14	5	Reg. Pref.	1st	
2014–15	4	3ª	15th	
2015–16	4	3ª	10th	
2016–17	4	3ª	13th	
2017–18	4	3ª	15th	
2018–19	4	3ª	11th	
2019–20	4	3ª	10th	
2020–21	4	3ª	6th / 2nd	
2021–22	5	3ª RFEF	4th	
2022–23	5	3ª Fed.	11th	
2023–24	5	3ª Fed.	13th	
2024–25	5	3ª Fed.	5th	
2025–26	5	3ª Fed.	7th	
2026–27	5	3ª Fed.		

- 13 seasons in Segunda División B
- 41 seasons in Tercera División
- 6 seasons in Tercera Federación/Tercera División RFEF

== Honours ==
- Tercera División: 1980–81, 1981–82, 1987–88, 1996–97, 1997–98
- Copa Federación de España: 1997–98

== Players ==
=== Current squad ===
As of 7 September 2024

Note: Flags indicate national team as defined under FIFA eligibility rules; some limited exceptions apply. Players may hold more than one non-FIFA nationality.

No.	Pos.	Nation	Player
1	GK	ESP	Mario Moriano
2	DF	ESP	Pedro de la Fuente
3	DF	ESP	Pau Faci
4	DF	ESP	Amine Laghrissi
5	DF	AND	Joel Guillén
6	MF	ESP	Vicen Torres
7	MF	ESP	Cesc Gómez
8	MF	ARG	Guido Ratto
9	FW	AND	Izan Fernández
10	MF	ESP	Chicho Barreda

No.	Pos.	Nation	Player
11	MF	ESP	Pol Raluy
12	FW	ESP	Raúl Samitier
13	GK	ESP	Álex Mansilla
14	FW	ESP	Igor Lalana
15	MF	ESP	Carlos Bernadó
16	DF	ESP	Álex Sanz
17	FW	AND	Gerard Solà
21	MF	ESP	Víctor Nevot
22	DF	ESP	Genís Cases

== Selected former coaches ==
- (Spain) David Rodrigo
