= Club Calzada =

Association football club in Spain

Calzada
- Full name: Club Calzada
- Founded: 1924
- Dissolved: 1969
- Ground: El Frontón, Gijón, Asturias, Spain
- Capacity: 1,000
Home colours

Club Calzada was a Spanish football club based in Gijón, in the autonomous community of Asturias. Founded in 1924 and dissolved in 1969, the club held their home matches at the Campo de Fútbol El Frontón.

== History ==
Founded in 1924, the club ceased activities in 1936 due to the Spanish Civil War, only returning in 1947. In 1951, they first achieved promotion to Tercera División, and remained in the category for 14 consecutive years.

After one season in Primera Regional, Calzada returned to Tercera in 1965, but suffered another relegation three years later. On 10 July 1969, they merged with Pelayo CF to create UD Gijón Industrial.

== Season to season ==
Season	Level	Division	Place	Copa del Rey
1947–48	5	2ª Reg.	1st	
1948–49	4	1ª Reg.	2nd	
1949–50	4	1ª Reg.	2nd	
1950–51	4	1ª Reg.	1st	
1951–52	3	3ª	14th	
1952–53	3	3ª	9th	
1953–54	3	3ª	7th	
1954–55	3	3ª	8th	
1955–56	3	3ª	6th	
1956–57	3	3ª	8th	
1957–58	3	3ª	6th	

Season	Level	Division	Place	Copa del Rey
1958–59	3	3ª	8th	
1959–60	3	3ª	9th	
1960–61	3	3ª	11th	
1961–62	3	3ª	8th	
1962–63	3	3ª	9th	
1963–64	3	3ª	15th	
1964–65	4	1ª Reg.	1st	
1965–66	3	3ª	11th	
1966–67	3	3ª	11th	
1967–68	3	3ª	15th	
1968–69	4	1ª Reg.	3rd	

- 17 seasons in Tercera División
