= CD Getxo =

Spanish football team

Coordinates: 43.3494°N 3.0002°W

Getxo
- Full name: Club Deportivo Getxo
- Nickname: Guaitos
- Founded: 9 June 1927; 98 years ago
- Ground: Campo Municipal de Fadura, Getxo, Basque Country, Spain
- Capacity: 3,500
- President: Iñaki Gerediaga
- Head coach: Xabi Herrero
- League: División de Honor
- 2024–25: División de Honor, 2nd of 18
- Website: www.cdgetxo.eus
Home colours	Away colours

Club Deportivo Getxo is a Spanish football team based in Getxo, Biscay, in the autonomous community of Basque Country. Founded in 1927 it plays in División de Honor, holding home matches at Campo Municipal de Fadura, with a 3,500-seat capacity.

== Season to season ==
Season	Tier	Division	Place	Copa del Rey
1928–29	7	3ª Reg. P.	1st	
1929–30	6	2ª Reg.	2nd	
1930–31	6	2ª Reg.	3rd	
1931–32	6	2ª Reg.	1st	
1932–33	5	2ª Reg. P.	4th	
1933–34	5	2ª Reg. P.	6th	
1934–35	4	1ª Reg. P.	1st	Second round
1935–36	4	1ª Reg. P.	9th	
1939–40	6	2ª Reg.	1st	
1940–41	5	1ª Reg. B	3rd	
1941–42	3	1ª Reg. A	8th	
1942–43	3	1ª Reg. A	9th	
1943–44	4	1ª Reg.	5th	
1944–45	4	1ª Reg.	1st	
1945–46	3	3ª	8th	
1946–47	3	3ª	8th	
1947–48	3	3ª	12th	Second round
1948–49	4	1ª Reg.	1st	
1949–50	3	3ª	6th	
1950–51	3	3ª	4th	

Season	Tier	Division	Place	Copa del Rey
1951–52	3	3ª	6th	
1952–53	3	3ª	4th	
1953–54	3	3ª	11th	
1954–55	3	3ª	7th	
1955–56	3	3ª	3rd	
1956–57	3	3ª	7th	
1957–58	3	3ª	12th	
1958–59	3	3ª	1st	
1959–60	3	3ª	6th	
1960–61	3	3ª	5th	
1961–62	3	3ª	6th	
1962–63	3	3ª	8th	
1963–64	3	3ª	5th	
1964–65	3	3ª	11th	
1965–66	3	3ª	14th	
1966–67	4	1ª Reg.	2nd	
1967–68	3	3ª	8th	
1968–69	3	3ª	13th	
1969–70	3	3ª	12th	Second round
1970–71	4	Reg. Pref.	2nd	

Season	Tier	Division	Place	Copa del Rey
1971–72	4	Reg. Pref.	1st	
1972–73	3	3ª	4th	First round
1973–74	3	3ª	7th	Fourth round
1974–75	3	3ª	13th	Second round
1975–76	3	3ª	12th	Second round
1976–77	3	3ª	11th	Second round
1977–78	4	3ª	4th	First round
1978–79	4	3ª	5th	First round
1979–80	3	2ª B	20th	Second round
1980–81	4	3ª	14th	
1981–82	4	3ª	17th	
1982–83	4	3ª	7th	
1983–84	4	3ª	5th	
1984–85	4	3ª	19th	First round
1985–86	5	Reg. Pref.	4th	
1986–87	5	Reg. Pref.	5th	
1987–88	5	Reg. Pref.	7th	
1988–89	5	Reg. Pref.	2nd	
1989–90	5	Reg. Pref.	1st	
1990–91	4	3ª	6th	

Season	Tier	Division	Place	Copa del Rey
1991–92	4	3ª	14th	First round
1992–93	4	3ª	9th	
1993–94	4	3ª	14th	
1994–95	4	3ª	6th	
1995–96	4	3ª	5th	
1996–97	4	3ª	12th	
1997–98	4	3ª	20th	
1998–99	5	Terr. Pref.	16th	
1999–2000	5	Terr. Pref.	16th	
2000–01	5	Terr. Pref.	7th	
2001–02	5	Terr. Pref.	10th	
2002–03	5	Div. Hon.	8th	
2003–04	5	Div. Hon.	11th	
2004–05	5	Div. Hon.	2nd	
2005–06	4	3ª	18th	
2006–07	5	Div. Hon.	7th	
2007–08	5	Div. Hon.	6th	
2008–09	5	Div. Hon.	10th	
2009–10	5	Div. Hon.	3rd	
2010–11	5	Div. Hon.	8th	

Season	Tier	Division	Place	Copa del Rey
2011–12	5	Div. Hon.	1st	
2012–13	4	3ª	18th	
2013–14	5	Div. Hon.	5th	
2014–15	5	Div. Hon.	2nd	
2015–16	4	3ª	11th	
2016–17	4	3ª	13th	
2017–18	4	3ª	19th	
2018–19	5	Div. Hon.	5th	
2019–20	5	Div. Hon.	3rd	
2020–21	5	Div. Hon.	8th	
2021–22	6	Div. Hon.	6th	
2022–23	6	Div. Hon.	16th	
2023–24	6	Div. Hon.	9th	
2024–25	6	Div. Hon.	2nd	
2025–26	6	Div. Hon.		First round

- 1 season in Segunda División B
- 47 seasons in Tercera División

== Honours ==
- Tercera División: (Note: Third tier) 1958–59 (Note: Not promoted in play-offs)

== Notable players ==
- (Spain) Tomas Agirre
- (Spain) Koldo Aguirre
- (Spain) Luis Echeberría
- (Spain) Manuel Etura
- (Spain) José María Maguregui
- (Spain) José Orúe
- (Spain) Carlos Ruiz
- (Spain) Daniel Ruiz
- (Spain) Ángel Villar
