= Club Portugalete =

Association football club in Spain

Coordinates: 43.318890°N 3.026332°W

Portugalete
- Full name: Club Portugalete
- Nickname: Portu
- Founded: 1909; 117 years ago
- Stadium: La Florida
- Capacity: 5,000
- President: Eduardo Rivacoba
- Head coach: Egoitz Bilbao Jiménez
- League: Segunda Federación – Group 1
- 2025–26: Tercera Federación – Group 4, 1st of 18 (champions
- Website: clubportugalete.eus
Home colours	Away colours

Club Portugalete is a Basque football team based in Portugalete, in the autonomous community of Basque Country. Founded in 1909, it plays in Segunda Federación – Group 1, holding its home games in the Estadio La Florida, with a capacity of 5,000 seats.

== History ==
Football arrived to the city of Portugalete in the end of the 19th century, with the first club of the city (Athletic Club Portugalete) being created in 1899. The history of Club Portugalete goes back to 1909, when Alfredo Hervias founded Club Deportivo Portugalete.

Refounded in 1921 under the name of Portugalete Football Club, the club ceased activities in 1936 due to the Spanish Civil War, returning in 1939 under the name of Club Deportivo Portugalete Chiqui and acting as a B-team of CD Portugalete (which was already a separated club at that time), but only remaining active for one season.

In 1944, the club was refounded as Nuevo Club Portugalete, and switched to the current name in 1956.

=== Club names ===
- Club Deportivo Portugalete (1909–1916)
- Portugalete Football Club (1921–1936)
- Club Deportivo Portugalete Chiqui (1939–1940)
- Nuevo Club Portugalete (1944–1956)
- Club Portugalete (1956–present)

== Season to season ==
Season	Tier	Division	Place	Copa del Rey
1928–29	5	2ª Reg. P.	6th	
1929–30	5	2ª Reg. P.	8th	
1930–31	6	2ª Reg.	1st	
1931–32	6	2ª Reg.	2nd	
1932–33	6	2ª Reg.	7th	
1933–34	6	2ª Reg.	1st	
1934–35	4	1ª Reg.	8th	
1935–36	5	2ª Reg. P.	4th	
1939–40	6	2ª Reg.	4th	
1940–1944	DNP			
1944–45	5	2ª Reg.	1st	
1945–46	5	2ª Reg.	2nd	
1946–47	5	2ª Reg.	2nd	
1947–48	5	2ª Reg.	1st	
1948–49	4	1ª Reg.	3rd	
1949–50	4	1ª Reg.	2nd	
1950–51	4	1ª Reg.	1st	
1951–52	3	3ª	8th	
1952–53	3	3ª	11th	
1953–54	3	3ª	6th	

Season	Tier	Division	Place	Copa del Rey
1954–55	3	3ª	10th	
1955–56	3	3ª	7th	
1956–57	3	3ª	12th	
1957–58	3	3ª	13th	
1958–59	4	1ª Reg.	3rd	
1959–60	4	1ª Reg.	9th	
1960–61	4	1ª Reg.	6th	
1961–62	4	1ª Reg.	5th	
1962–63	4	1ª Reg.	1st	
1963–64	3	3ª	11th	
1964–65	3	3ª	4th	
1965–66	3	3ª	13th	
1966–67	4	1ª Reg.	1st	
1967–68	3	3ª	14th	
1968–69	4	Reg. Pref.	11th	
1969–70	4	Reg. Pref.	11th	
1970–71	5	1ª Reg.	8th	
1971–72	5	1ª Reg.	1st	
1972–73	4	Reg. Pref.	7th	
1973–74	4	Reg. Pref.	3rd	

Season	Tier	Division	Place	Copa del Rey
1974–75	4	Reg. Pref.	7th	
1975–76	4	Reg. Pref.	14th	
1976–77	4	Reg. Pref.	6th	
1977–78	5	Reg. Pref.	6th	
1978–79	5	Reg. Pref.	5th	
1979–80	5	Reg. Pref.	8th	
1980–81	5	Reg. Pref.	4th	
1981–82	5	Reg. Pref.	14th	
1982–83	5	Reg. Pref.	17th	
1983–84	6	1ª Reg.	1st	
1984–85	5	Reg. Pref.	1st	
1985–86	4	3ª	8th	
1986–87	4	3ª	14th	
1987–88	4	3ª	18th	
1988–89	5	Reg. Pref.	8th	
1989–90	5	Reg. Pref.	8th	
1990–91	5	Terr. Pref.	5th	
1991–92	5	Terr. Pref.	3rd	
1992–93	5	Terr. Pref.	7th	
1993–94	5	Terr. Pref.	5th	

Season	Tier	Division	Place	Copa del Rey
1994–95	5	Terr. Pref.	2nd	
1995–96	5	Terr. Pref.	3rd	
1996–97	5	Terr. Pref.	2nd	
1997–98	5	Terr. Pref.	2nd	
1998–99	5	Terr. Pref.	3rd	
1999–2000	5	Terr. Pref.	2nd	
2000–01	5	Terr. Pref.	1st	
2001–02	4	3ª	10th	
2002–03	4	3ª	11th	
2003–04	4	3ª	5th	
2004–05	4	3ª	1st	
2005–06	3	2ª B	19th	Second round
2006–07	4	3ª	3rd	
2007–08	4	3ª	1st	
2008–09	4	3ª	4th	Round of 32
2009–10	4	3ª	2nd	
2010–11	4	3ª	6th	Round of 32
2011–12	4	3ª	3rd	
2012–13	4	3ª	3rd	
2013–14	4	3ª	2nd	

Season	Tier	Division	Place	Copa del Rey
2014–15	4	3ª	1st	
2015–16	3	2ª B	19th	First round
2016–17	4	3ª	5th	
2017–18	4	3ª	2nd	
2018–19	4	3ª	1st	
2019–20	4	3ª	1st	Second round
2020–21	3	2ª B	8th / 4th	Second round
2021–22	5	3ª RFEF	3rd	
2022–23	5	3ª Fed.	6th	
2023–24	5	3ª Fed.	5th	
2024–25	5	3ª Fed.	2nd	
2025–26	5	3ª Fed.	1st	Second round
2026–27	4	2ª Fed.		TBD

- 3 seasons in Segunda División B
- 1 season in Segunda Federación
- 31 seasons in Tercera División
- 5 seasons in Tercera Federación/Tercera División RFEF

== Current squad ==
As of 10 September 2026

Note: Flags indicate national team as defined under FIFA eligibility rules; some limited exceptions apply. Players may hold more than one non-FIFA nationality.

No.	Pos.	Nation	Player
1	GK	ESP	Ibon González
2	DF	ESP	Anartz Amilibia
3	DF	ESP	Iñaki Recio
4	DF	ESP	Unai Lechosa
5	DF	ESP	Ander González
6	MF	ESP	Iker Llamazares
7	FW	ESP	Alain Arreitunandia
8	MF	ESP	Oier Erdozia
9	FW	ESP	Imanol Aránburu
10	MF	ESP	Jorge García
11	MF	ESP	Aimar Barrera
12	DF	ESP	Javier Elías

No.	Pos.	Nation	Player
13	GK	ESP	Kevin Ríos
14	MF	ESP	Diego Lamadrid
15	DF	ESP	Uztaritz Expósito
16	MF	ESP	Yeray Cuello
17	MF	ESP	Unax Odriozola
18	DF	ESP	Gorka Tapiador
19	MF	ESP	Jon López
20	MF	ESP	Ander Honrado
21	FW	ESP	Gorka Crespo
22	DF	ESP	Iván Del Campo
23	MF	ESP	Markel Mayo

=== Out on loan ===
Note: Flags indicate national team as defined under FIFA eligibility rules; some limited exceptions apply. Players may hold more than one non-FIFA nationality.

No.	Pos.	Nation	Player
