= Arosa SC =

Association football club in Spain

Coordinates: 42.588589°N 8.776056°W

Arosa
- Full name: Arosa Sociedad Cultural
- Founded: 1945
- Ground: A Lomba, Vilagarcía de Arousa, Galicia, Spain
- Capacity: 5,000
- President: Manuel Abalo
- Head coach: Rafael Sáez
- League: Segunda Federación – Group 1
- 2025–26: Tercera Federación – Group 1, 1st of 18 (champions)
| Home colours | Away colours |

Arosa Sociedad Cultural is a Spanish football team based in Vilagarcía de Arousa, in the autonomous community of Galicia. Founded in 1945, it plays in Segunda Federación – Group 1, holding home games at Estadio de A Lomba, with a capacity of 5,000 seats.

== Season to season ==
| Season | Tier | Division | Place | Copa del Rey |
|---|---|---|---|---|
| 1945–46 | 5 | 1ª Reg. | | |
| 1946–47 | 4 | Serie A | 2nd | |
| 1947–48 | 3 | 3ª | 4th | Second round |
| 1948–49 | 3 | 3ª | 2nd | Second round |
| 1949–50 | 2 | 2ª | 16th | First round |
| 1950–51 | 3 | 3ª | 11th | |
| 1951–52 | 3 | 3ª | 4th | |
| 1952–53 | 3 | 3ª | 6th | |
| 1953–54 | 3 | 3ª | 14th | |
| 1954–55 | 3 | 3ª | 9th | |
| 1955–56 | 4 | Serie A | 3rd | |
| 1956–57 | 3 | 3ª | 4th | |
| 1957–58 | 3 | 3ª | 12th | |
| 1958–59 | 3 | 3ª | 10th | |
| 1959–60 | 3 | 3ª | 6th | |
| 1960–61 | 3 | 3ª | 9th | |
| 1961–62 | 3 | 3ª | 3rd | |
| 1962–63 | 3 | 3ª | 6th | |
| 1963–64 | 3 | 3ª | 11th | |
| 1964–65 | 3 | 3ª | 8th | |

| Season | Tier | Division | Place | Copa del Rey |
|---|---|---|---|---|
| 1965–66 | 3 | 3ª | 7th | |
| 1966–67 | 3 | 3ª | 6th | |
| 1967–68 | 3 | 3ª | 10th | |
| 1968–69 | 3 | 3ª | 20th | |
| 1969–70 | 4 | Serie A | 3rd | |
| 1970–71 | 4 | Serie A | 11th | |
| 1971–72 | 4 | Serie A | 5th | |
| 1972–73 | 4 | Serie A | 2nd | |
| 1973–74 | 4 | Serie A | 4th | |
| 1974–75 | 4 | Serie A | 1st | |
| 1975–76 | 3 | 3ª | 13th | |
| 1976–77 | 3 | 3ª | 18th | |
| 1977–78 | 4 | 3ª | 11th | Second round |
| 1978–79 | 4 | 3ª | 13th | First round |
| 1979–80 | 4 | 3ª | 8th | First round |
| 1980–81 | 4 | 3ª | 2nd | Second round |
| 1981–82 | 4 | 3ª | 4th | Second round |
| 1982–83 | 4 | 3ª | 2nd | First round |
| 1983–84 | 3 | 2ª B | 15th | Second round |
| 1984–85 | 3 | 2ª B | 14th | |

| Season | Tier | Division | Place | Copa del Rey |
|---|---|---|---|---|
| 1985–86 | 3 | 2ª B | 17th | |
| 1986–87 | 4 | 3ª | 5th | |
| 1987–88 | 3 | 2ª B | 15th | First round |
| 1988–89 | 3 | 2ª B | 9th | Round of 32 |
| 1989–90 | 3 | 2ª B | 20th | |
| 1990–91 | 4 | 3ª | 11th | First round |
| 1991–92 | 4 | 3ª | 9th | |
| 1992–93 | 4 | 3ª | 1st | |
| 1993–94 | 3 | 2ª B | 16th | Third round |
| 1994–95 | 4 | 3ª | 6th | |
| 1995–96 | 4 | 3ª | 16th | |
| 1996–97 | 4 | 3ª | 14th | |
| 1997–98 | 4 | 3ª | 6th | |
| 1998–99 | 4 | 3ª | 10th | |
| 1999–2000 | 4 | 3ª | 18th | |
| 2000–01 | 5 | Reg. Pref. | 1st | |
| 2001–02 | 4 | 3ª | 16th | |
| 2002–03 | 4 | 3ª | 11th | |
| 2003–04 | 4 | 3ª | 16th | |
| 2004–05 | 4 | 3ª | 15th | |

| Season | Tier | Division | Place | Copa del Rey |
|---|---|---|---|---|
| 2005–06 | 4 | 3ª | 7th | |
| 2006–07 | 4 | 3ª | 16th | |
| 2007–08 | 4 | 3ª | 11th | |
| 2008–09 | 4 | 3ª | 19th | |
| 2009–10 | 5 | Pref. Aut. | 4th | |
| 2010–11 | 5 | Pref. Aut. | 12th | |
| 2011–12 | 5 | Pref. Aut. | 6th | |
| 2012–13 | 5 | Pref. Aut. | 3rd | |
| 2013–14 | 4 | 3ª | 7th | |
| 2014–15 | 4 | 3ª | 11th | |
| 2015–16 | 4 | 3ª | 9th | |
| 2016–17 | 4 | 3ª | 6th | |
| 2017–18 | 4 | 3ª | 5th | |
| 2018–19 | 4 | 3ª | 9th | |
| 2019–20 | 4 | 3ª | 3rd | |
| 2020–21 | 4 | 3ª | 2nd | |
| 2021–22 | 4 | 2ª RFEF | 17th | |
| 2022–23 | 5 | 3ª Fed. | 2nd | |
| 2023–24 | 5 | 3ª Fed. | 2nd | Second round |
| 2024–25 | 5 | 3ª Fed. | 6th | |

| Season | Tier | Division | Place | Copa del Rey |
|---|---|---|---|---|
| 2025–26 | 5 | 3ª Fed. | 1st | |
| 2026–27 | 4 | 2ª Fed. | | TBD |

- 1 season in Segunda División
- 7 seasons in Segunda División B
- 2 seasons in Segunda Federación/Segunda División RFEF
- 54 seasons in Tercera División
- 4 seasons in Tercera Federación

== Honours ==
- Tercera División: 1992–93

== Selected former players ==
- (Spain) Ignacio Cantero
- (Spain) Rubén Coméndez
- (Spain) Manuel Jiménez
- (Spain) Emilio López
