= 1953–54 Tercera División =

Tercera División
- Season: 1953–54

The 1953–54 Tercera División season was the 18th since its establishment.

== Format ==
111 clubs participated in 6 geographic groups. The 6 group winners were promoted to the Segunda División. The 6 runners up joined the 12th and 13th placed teams in Groups I and II of the Segunda División to form two groups of 5 clubs who each played 8 further matches. The winners and runners up of each group took their places in the Segunda División.

== League tables ==
=== Group I ===
Pos	Team	Pld	W	D	L	GF	GA	GD	Pts
1	Juvenil	34	21	5	8	75	46	+29	47
2	Ponferradina	34	20	5	9	80	46	+34	45
3	Europa Delicias	34	18	8	8	79	43	+36	44
4	Turista	34	17	6	11	67	47	+20	40
5	Lugo	34	14	12	8	51	41	+10	40
6	Calzada	34	15	8	11	65	52	+13	38
7	Atlético de Zamora	34	17	4	13	66	54	+12	38
8	Arsenal	34	12	12	10	64	59	+5	36
9	San Martín	34	17	2	15	60	68	−8	36
10	Júpiter Leonés	34	15	4	15	78	64	+14	34
11	Langreano	34	12	9	13	58	50	+8	33
12	Pontevedra	34	13	6	15	67	70	−3	32
13	Turón	34	13	5	16	69	80	−11	31
14	Arosa	34	10	7	17	50	74	−24	27
15	Ourense	34	11	5	18	46	76	−30	27
16	Lemos	34	8	8	18	42	68	−26	24
17	Santiago	34	8	4	22	43	79	−36	20
16	Marín	34	9	2	23	60	103	−43	20

=== Group II ===
Pos	Team	Pld	W	D	L	GF	GA	GD	Pts
1	Sestao	36	23	7	6	91	41	+50	53
2	Huesca	36	19	7	10	76	50	+26	45
3	Arenas de Getxo	36	18	9	9	69	48	+21	45
4	Mondragón	36	19	6	11	68	49	+19	44
5	Anaitasuna	36	18	4	14	90	72	+18	40
6	Portugalete	36	17	6	13	76	59	+17	40
7	Burgos	36	16	6	14	65	59	+6	38
8	Rayo Cantabria	36	17	4	15	69	71	−2	38
9	Indautxu	36	13	10	13	56	62	−6	36
10	Erandio	36	15	5	16	73	71	+2	35
11	Getxo	36	12	9	15	69	65	+4	33
12	Numancia	36	14	4	18	69	83	−14	32
13	Baskonia	36	13	5	18	50	62	−12	31
14	Azkoyen	36	15	1	20	53	84	−31	31
15	Begoña	36	13	4	19	59	65	−6	30
16	Izarra	36	10	10	16	57	71	−14	30
17	Tudelano	36	11	8	17	48	63	−15	30
18	Mirandés	36	8	9	19	52	93	−41	25
19	Binéfar	36	11	6	19	52	74	−22	0 (Note: 28 point deducted. CD Binéfar failed to travel to their away matches at Erandio and Rayo Cantabria and were punished by having all their points deducted.)

=== Group III ===
Pos	Team	Pld	W	D	L	GF	GA	GD	Pts
1	Terrassa	36	21	7	8	77	49	+28	49
2	Girona	36	18	9	9	76	46	+30	45
3	Europa	36	18	7	11	81	54	+27	43
4	Sant Andreu	36	18	7	11	56	42	+14	43
5	Manresa	36	18	3	15	75	64	+11	39
6	Mahón	36	16	7	13	63	56	+7	39
7	Atlético Baleares	36	17	4	15	73	65	+8	38
8	Manacor	36	16	5	15	93	66	+27	37
9	Constància	36	17	3	16	56	65	−9	37
10	Badalona	36	15	6	15	57	60	−3	36
11	Gimnàstic de Tarragona	36	17	2	17	72	77	−5	36
12	Tortosa	36	15	5	16	67	64	+3	35
13	Reus	36	13	8	15	73	81	−8	34
14	Sants	36	13	7	16	63	65	−2	33
15	Vic	36	12	9	15	53	76	−23	33
16	Mataró	36	10	10	16	56	74	−18	30
17	Granollers	36	12	5	19	66	87	−21	29
18	Martinenc	36	11	5	20	49	82	−33	27
19	Horta	36	8	5	23	62	95	−33	21

=== Group IV ===
Pos	Team	Pld	W	D	L	GF	GA	GD	Pts
1	Extremadura	34	22	6	6	110	41	+69	50
2	Cacereño	34	22	5	7	106	43	+63	49
3	Plus Ultra	34	21	7	6	95	51	+44	49
4	Emeritense	34	18	5	11	71	59	+12	41
5	Calvo Sotelo	34	15	9	10	79	57	+22	39
6	Don Benito	34	15	5	14	68	74	−6	35
7	Girod	34	15	5	14	60	69	−9	35
8	Manchego	34	13	8	13	80	53	+27	34
9	Real Aranjuez	34	13	7	14	67	53	+14	33
10	Arenas de Zaragoza	34	15	2	17	69	91	−22	32
11	Toledo	34	12	7	15	58	69	−11	31
12	Marconi	34	12	7	15	52	78	−26	31
13	Amistad	34	13	4	17	63	73	−10	30
14	Guadalajara	34	13	4	17	68	81	−13	30
15	San Lorenzo	34	12	4	18	61	84	−23	28
16	Calatayud	34	12	3	19	48	75	−27	27
17	Rayo Vallecano	34	10	1	23	45	88	−43	21
18	Cuatro Caminos	34	7	3	24	43	104	−61	17

=== Group V ===
Pos	Team	Pld	W	D	L	GF	GA	GD	Pts
1	Levante	34	21	9	4	101	44	+57	51
2	Orihuela	34	20	5	9	69	49	+20	45
3	Elche	34	19	6	9	84	62	+22	44
4	Hellín	34	16	6	12	81	58	+23	38
5	Alicante	34	17	3	14	89	69	+20	37
6	Gandía	34	14	7	13	74	67	+7	35
7	Yeclano	34	16	3	15	68	77	−9	35
8	Eldense	34	14	6	14	54	53	+1	34
9	Lorca	34	14	4	16	75	68	+7	32
10	Alzira	34	12	8	14	66	73	−7	32
11	Villena	34	15	2	17	61	71	−10	32
12	Albacete	34	13	4	17	67	71	−4	30
13	Soriano	34	10	10	14	60	64	−4	30
14	Catarroja	34	12	6	16	69	74	−5	30
15	Naval	34	11	8	15	63	75	−12	30
16	Cartagena	34	12	5	17	68	78	−10	29
17	Aspense	34	13	1	20	52	98	−46	27
18	Novelda	34	9	3	22	50	100	−50	21

=== Group VI ===
Pos	Team	Pld	W	D	L	GF	GA	GD	Pts
1	Real Betis	36	25	7	4	81	28	+53	57
2	San Fernando	36	20	6	10	115	56	+59	46
3	Cádiz	36	21	3	12	91	52	+39	45
4	Ceuta	36	18	6	12	65	43	+22	42
5	San Álvaro	36	20	2	14	76	55	+21	42
6	Almería	36	17	6	13	72	46	+26	38 (Note: 2 points deducted. In their home game against Cádiz, Almería's team walked off the pitch.)
7	Algeciras	36	17	4	15	75	54	+21	38
8	Martos	36	15	8	13	74	64	+10	38
9	Recreativo de Granada	36	15	6	15	58	64	−6	36
10	Recreativo de Huelva	36	14	6	16	49	62	−13	34
11	Larache	36	15	3	18	65	87	−22	33
12	Córdoba	36	11	10	15	51	47	+4	32
13	Iliturgi	36	12	8	16	63	80	−17	32
14	Español de Tetuán	36	13	4	19	66	81	−15	30
15	Atlético Malagueño	36	12	6	18	64	83	−19	30
16	Utrera	36	13	4	19	50	88	−38	30
17	Valdepeñas	36	14	1	21	45	86	−41	29
18	Úbeda	36	9	7	20	44	83	−39	25
19	Unión Sevillana	36	10	5	21	51	96	−45	25

== Promotion playoff ==
=== Group I ===
Pos	Team	Pld	W	D	L	GF	GA	GD	Pts
1	Caudal	8	6	0	2	16	7	+9	12
2	La Felguera	8	4	1	3	15	13	+2	9
3	Ponferradina	8	3	2	3	10	13	−3	8
4	Huesca	8	3	1	4	13	16	−3	7
5	Girona	8	2	0	6	13	18	−5	4

Note: Both Caudal and La Felguera retained their places in the Segunda División.

=== Group II ===
Pos	Team	Pld	W	D	L	GF	GA	GD	Pts
1	San Fernando	8	5	0	3	26	13	+13	10
2	Real Murcia	8	5	0	3	23	9	+14	10
3	Cacereño	8	4	0	4	12	22	−10	8
4	Melilla	8	3	0	5	16	17	−1	6
5	Orihuela	8	3	0	5	8	24	−16	6

Note: San Fernando were promoted to the Segunda División and Murcia retained their place.

== Season records ==
- Most wins: 25, Real Betis.
- Most draws: 12, Lugo and Arsenal.
- Most losses: 24, Cuatro Caminos.
- Most goals for: 115, San Fernando.
- Most goals against: 104, Cuatro Caminos.
- Most points: 57, Real Betis.
- Fewest wins: 7, Cuatro Caminos.
- Fewest draws: 1, Azkoyen, Rayo Vallecano, Aspense and Valdepeñas.
- Fewest losses: 4, Real Betis and Levante.
- Fewest goals for: 42, Lemos.
- Fewest goals against: 28, Real Betis.
- Fewest points: 0, Binéfar.
