= 1952–53 Tercera División =

Tercera División
- Season: 1952–53

The 1952–53 Tercera División season was the 17th since its establishment.

== Format ==
99 clubs participated in 6 geographic groups. One club, Tomelloso CF, withdrew at the start of the season. The 6 group winners were promoted to the Segunda División. The 6 runners-up joined the teams in 12th and 13th place in Segunda División Grupo I and the team in 13th place in Segunda División Grupo II to form one play-off group of 5 teams (Grupo I) and another of 4 teams (Grupo II). The winner and runner up of Grupo I earned a place in the Segunda División as did the winner of Grupo II. The 12th team in Segunda División Grupo II played off against Tenerife, champions of the Canarias Regional League (not part of the Tercera División).

== League tables ==
=== Group I ===
Pos	Team	Pld	W	D	L	GF	GA	GD	Pts
1	La Felguera	30	17	7	6	57	27	+30	41
2	Cultural Leonesa	30	18	4	8	78	36	+42	40
3	Ponferradina	30	18	2	10	69	38	+31	38
4	Arsenal	30	15	4	11	53	41	+12	34
5	Juvenil	30	14	6	10	49	45	+4	34
6	Arosa	30	15	3	12	47	47	0	33
7	Polvorín	30	13	6	11	37	35	+2	32
8	Atlético de Zamora	30	12	5	13	42	43	−1	29
9	Calzada	30	12	5	13	41	47	−6	29
10	Langreano	30	12	3	15	38	59	−21	27
11	Lemos	30	9	8	13	37	56	−19	26
12	Pontevedra	30	8	9	13	55	57	−2	25
13	Turón	30	11	3	16	47	62	−15	25
14	Santiago	30	9	5	16	41	63	−22	23
15	Marín	30	8	6	16	44	60	−16	22
16	Vetusta	30	8	6	16	42	61	−19	22

=== Group II ===
Pos	Team	Pld	W	D	L	GF	GA	GD	Pts
1	Eibar	34	23	6	5	93	40	+53	52
2	Sestao	34	17	9	8	62	33	+29	43
3	Mirandés	34	18	6	10	73	48	+25	42
4	Getxo	34	18	6	10	67	45	+22	42
5	Mondragón	34	16	8	10	69	51	+18	40
6	Baskonia	34	15	7	12	65	62	+3	37
7	Numancia	34	17	3	14	60	61	−1	37
8	Izarra	34	17	2	15	68	60	+8	36
9	Indautxu	34	13	8	13	54	51	+3	34
10	Portugalete	34	11	8	15	43	52	−9	30
11	Arenas de Getxo	34	10	10	14	46	67	−21	30
12	Rayo Cantabria	34	12	5	17	54	66	−12	29
13	Garellano	34	11	7	16	57	72	−15	29
14	Azkoyen	34	13	3	18	48	80	−32	29
15	Calatayud	34	13	2	19	40	68	−28	28
16	Erandio	34	10	6	18	58	61	−3	26
17	Recreación de Logroño	34	9	7	18	48	60	−12	24 (Note: 1 point deducted. Recreación de Logroño fielded an ineligible player in a 5-0 win over Rayo Cantabria. The win was awarded to Rayo.)
18	Calahorra	34	9	5	20	51	79	−28	23

=== Group III ===
Pos	Team	Pld	W	D	L	GF	GA	GD	Pts
1	Escoriaza	34	23	2	9	106	53	+53	48
2	Mataró	34	18	9	7	74	52	+22	45
3	Terrassa	34	20	3	11	69	53	+16	43
4	Badalona	34	18	6	10	94	61	+33	42
5	Manresa	34	18	3	13	83	65	+18	39
6	Europa	34	18	3	13	83	69	+14	39
7	Sants	34	17	5	12	64	54	+10	39
8	Granollers	34	15	8	11	87	67	+20	38
9	Girona	34	16	6	12	61	44	+17	38
10	Binéfar	34	17	2	15	76	68	+8	36
11	Arenas de Zaragoza	34	13	7	14	64	61	+3	33
12	Amistad	34	14	5	15	66	79	−13	33
13	Tortosa	34	14	3	17	61	68	−7	31
14	Martinenc	34	12	6	16	43	56	−13	30
15	Horta	34	13	3	18	48	83	−35	29
16	Atlético Universitario	34	12	3	19	58	81	−23	27
17	Igualada	34	6	5	23	45	77	−32	17
18	Tàrrega	34	2	1	31	26	117	−91	3 (Note: 2 points deducted. Tàrrega failed to appear for their match at Arenas de Zaragoza. The win was awarded to Arenas.)

=== Group IV ===
Pos	Team	Pld	W	D	L	GF	GA	GD	Pts
1	Badajoz	26	19	3	4	99	32	+67	41
2	Calvo Sotelo	26	16	5	5	75	35	+40	37
3	Extremadura	26	16	2	8	69	36	+33	34
4	Manchego	26	14	2	10	73	44	+29	30
5	Toledo	26	11	6	9	64	45	+19	28
6	Girod	26	12	4	10	50	47	+3	28
7	Rayo Vallecano	26	11	4	11	34	50	−16	26
8	Cuatro Caminos	26	11	3	12	46	55	−9	25
9	Emeritense	26	10	4	12	52	53	−1	24
10	Valdepeñas	26	10	4	12	40	60	−20	24
11	Guadalajara	26	9	4	13	39	69	−30	22
12	San Lorenzo	26	6	7	13	45	62	−17	19
13	Europa Delicias	26	6	4	16	30	66	−36	16
14	Conquense	26	3	4	19	24	86	−62	10

=== Group V ===
Pos	Team	Pld	W	D	L	GF	GA	GD	Pts
1	Castellón	30	18	5	7	79	40	+39	41
2	Levante	30	16	5	9	81	46	+35	37
3	Hellín	30	15	4	11	71	49	+22	34
4	Albacete	30	16	2	12	68	56	+12	34
5	Alzira	30	14	4	12	51	60	−9	32
6	Alicante	30	10	10	10	58	44	+14	30
7	Villena	30	14	2	14	83	74	+9	30
8	Manacor	30	13	4	13	55	52	+3	30
9	Aspense	30	12	5	13	50	66	−16	29
10	Novelda	30	13	3	14	59	86	−27	29
11	Lorca	30	12	4	14	57	60	−3	28
12	Mahón	30	11	6	13	52	62	−10	28
13	Soriano	30	11	4	15	59	58	+1	26
14	Catarroja	30	9	6	15	54	69	−15	24
15	Naval	30	9	6	15	51	75	−24	24
16	Elche	30	11	2	17	42	73	−31	24

=== Group VI ===
Pos	Team	Pld	W	D	L	GF	GA	GD	Pts
1	Xerez	30	20	3	7	88	42	+46	43
2	España de Tánger	30	20	2	8	94	41	+53	42
3	Cádiz	30	17	3	10	73	47	+26	37
4	Algeciras	30	16	4	10	102	45	+57	36
5	Real Betis	30	17	2	11	72	58	+14	36
6	Ceuta	30	15	3	12	55	47	+8	33
7	Recreativo de Granada	30	15	3	12	56	57	−1	33
8	Recreativo de Huelva	30	15	2	13	83	66	+17	32
9	Almería	30	15	2	13	55	49	+6	32
10	Iliturgi	30	15	1	14	75	74	+1	31
11	San Fernando	30	13	1	16	52	77	−25	27
12	Español de Tetuán	30	11	5	14	47	74	−27	27
13	Unión Sevillana	30	12	2	16	58	86	−28	26
14	Úbeda	30	11	1	18	52	79	−27	23
15	Utrera	30	6	2	22	38	91	−53	14
16	Atlético Malagueño	30	2	4	24	34	101	−67	5 (Note: 3 points deducted. Atlético Malagueño fielded 2 ineligible players in a 2-0 win at home to Real Betis. The win was awarded to Betis.)

== Promotion playoff ==
=== Group I ===
Pos	Team	Pld	W	D	L	GF	GA	GD	Pts
1	Gimnástica de Torrelavega	8	5	0	3	17	11	+6	10
2	Cultural Leonesa	8	4	0	4	21	19	+2	8
3	Mataró	8	4	0	4	17	16	+1	8
4	Salamanca	8	4	0	4	12	10	+2	8
5	Sestao	8	3	0	5	11	22	−11	6

Note: Gimnástica de Torrelavega retained their place in the Segunda División and Cultural Leonesa were promoted. UD Salamanca were later reprieved from relegation following the withdrawal of CD San Andrés from the Segunda División.

=== Group II ===
Pos	Team	Pld	W	D	L	GF	GA	GD	Pts
1	España de Tánger	6	3	2	1	12	5	+7	8
2	Levante	6	3	2	1	15	11	+4	8
3	Córdoba	6	1	3	2	13	16	−3	5
4	Calvo Sotelo	6	1	1	4	12	20	−8	3

Note: España de Tánger were promoted to the Segunda División.

=== Group III ===
Team 1	Agg.	Team 2	1st leg	2nd leg
Orihuela	2–4	Tenerife	2–1	0–3

Note: CD Tenerife were promoted to the Segunda División.

== Season records ==
- Most wins: 23, Eibar and Escoriaza.
- Most draws: 10, Arenas de Getxo and Alicante.
- Most losses: 31, Tàrrega.
- Most goals for: 106, Escoriaza.
- Most goals against: 117, Tàrrega.
- Most points: 52, Eibar.
- Fewest wins: 2, Tàrrega and Atlético Malagueño.
- Fewest draws: 1, Tàrrega, Iliturgi, San Fernando and Úbeda.
- Fewest losses: 4, Badajoz.
- Fewest goals for: 24, Conquense.
- Fewest goals against: 27, La Felguera.
- Fewest points: 3, Tàrrega.
