= 1954–55 Tercera División =

Tercera División
- Season: 1954–55

The 1954–55 Tercera División season was the 19th since its establishment.

== Format ==
164 teams competed in 16 geographic groups. For the first time there were North African and Balearic Islands groups.

Promotion:Each group winner and runner-up (32 teams) progressed to the Fase Final where 4 groups of 8 teams were formed. The four group winners were promoted to the Segunda División.

Relegation The remaining teams in the geographic groups were joined by teams from the fourth tier - the Regional leagues - to contest places in the following season's Tercera División.

== League tables ==
=== Group I ===
| Pos | Team | Pld | W | D | L | GF | GA | GD | Pts |
|---|---|---|---|---|---|---|---|---|---|
| 1 | Arsenal | 18 | 10 | 5 | 3 | 44 | 17 | +27 | 25 |
| 2 | Pontevedra | 18 | 11 | 2 | 5 | 46 | 31 | +15 | 24 |
| 3 | Marín | 18 | 10 | 4 | 4 | 35 | 30 | +5 | 24 |
| 4 | Ourense | 18 | 9 | 5 | 4 | 36 | 25 | +11 | 23 |
| 5 | Lemos | 18 | 7 | 5 | 6 | 29 | 32 | −3 | 19 |
| 6 | Turista | 18 | 5 | 6 | 7 | 38 | 36 | +2 | 16 |
| 7 | Fabril | 18 | 6 | 3 | 9 | 36 | 31 | +5 | 15 |
| 8 | Lugo | 18 | 5 | 3 | 10 | 27 | 44 | −17 | 13 |
| 9 | Arosa | 18 | 4 | 3 | 11 | 19 | 39 | −20 | 11 |
| 10 | Santiago | 18 | 3 | 4 | 11 | 19 | 44 | −25 | 10 |

=== Group II ===
| Pos | Team | Pld | W | D | L | GF | GA | GD | Pts |
|---|---|---|---|---|---|---|---|---|---|
| 1 | Langreano | 18 | 11 | 4 | 3 | 44 | 19 | +25 | 26 |
| 2 | Gimnástica de Torrelavega | 18 | 10 | 5 | 3 | 51 | 29 | +22 | 25 |
| 3 | Laredo | 18 | 10 | 2 | 6 | 41 | 32 | +9 | 22 |
| 4 | Rayo Cantabria | 18 | 8 | 4 | 6 | 52 | 29 | +23 | 20 |
| 5 | San Martín | 18 | 9 | 2 | 7 | 28 | 27 | +1 | 20 |
| 6 | Titánico | 18 | 8 | 2 | 8 | 36 | 45 | −9 | 18 |
| 7 | Turón | 18 | 5 | 4 | 9 | 31 | 50 | −19 | 14 |
| 8 | Calzada | 18 | 5 | 3 | 10 | 36 | 49 | −13 | 13 |
| 9 | Santoña | 18 | 5 | 2 | 11 | 29 | 46 | −17 | 12 |
| 10 | Juvencia | 18 | 3 | 4 | 11 | 32 | 54 | −22 | 10 |

=== Group III ===
| Pos | Team | Pld | W | D | L | GF | GA | GD | Pts |
|---|---|---|---|---|---|---|---|---|---|
| 1 | Burgos | 18 | 12 | 2 | 4 | 38 | 18 | +20 | 26 |
| 2 | Indautxu | 18 | 11 | 2 | 5 | 32 | 17 | +15 | 24 |
| 3 | Baskonia | 18 | 11 | 1 | 6 | 29 | 32 | −3 | 23 |
| 4 | Mirandés | 18 | 9 | 1 | 8 | 24 | 23 | +1 | 19 |
| 5 | Erandio | 18 | 8 | 3 | 7 | 23 | 23 | 0 | 19 |
| 6 | Villosa | 18 | 7 | 4 | 7 | 30 | 23 | +7 | 18 |
| 7 | Getxo | 18 | 6 | 3 | 9 | 28 | 33 | −5 | 15 |
| 8 | Begoña | 18 | 6 | 2 | 10 | 24 | 27 | −3 | 14 |
| 9 | Arenas de Getxo | 18 | 5 | 2 | 11 | 20 | 29 | −9 | 12 |
| 10 | Portugalete | 18 | 5 | 0 | 13 | 22 | 45 | −23 | 10 |

=== Group IV ===
| Pos | Team | Pld | W | D | L | GF | GA | GD | Pts |
|---|---|---|---|---|---|---|---|---|---|
| 1 | Tudelano | 18 | 12 | 2 | 4 | 37 | 22 | +15 | 26 |
| 2 | Elgoibar | 18 | 11 | 3 | 4 | 51 | 24 | +27 | 25 |
| 3 | Mondragón | 18 | 9 | 2 | 7 | 37 | 26 | +11 | 20 |
| 4 | Villafranca | 18 | 9 | 2 | 7 | 31 | 29 | +2 | 20 |
| 5 | Recreación de Logroño | 18 | 7 | 4 | 7 | 43 | 40 | +3 | 18 |
| 6 | Peña Sport | 18 | 5 | 6 | 7 | 28 | 38 | −10 | 16 |
| 7 | Izarra | 18 | 5 | 5 | 8 | 22 | 26 | −4 | 15 |
| 8 | Anaitasuna | 18 | 5 | 5 | 8 | 25 | 33 | −8 | 15 |
| 9 | Calahorra | 18 | 7 | 1 | 10 | 22 | 46 | −24 | 14 (Note: 1 point deducted for fielding ineligible player in home match against Tudelano (lost 0-3).) |
| 10 | Azkoyen | 18 | 3 | 4 | 11 | 19 | 31 | −12 | 10 |

=== Group V ===
| Pos | Team | Pld | W | D | L | GF | GA | GD | Pts |
|---|---|---|---|---|---|---|---|---|---|
| 1 | Arenas | 18 | 12 | 3 | 3 | 34 | 16 | +18 | 27 |
| 2 | Binéfar | 18 | 11 | 1 | 6 | 40 | 25 | +15 | 23 |
| 3 | Numancia | 18 | 9 | 2 | 7 | 33 | 26 | +7 | 20 |
| 4 | Calatayud | 18 | 8 | 4 | 6 | 31 | 27 | +4 | 20 |
| 5 | Utebo | 18 | 8 | 3 | 7 | 27 | 28 | −1 | 19 |
| 6 | Montañanesa | 18 | 8 | 2 | 8 | 31 | 31 | 0 | 18 |
| 7 | Amistad | 18 | 7 | 1 | 10 | 35 | 38 | −3 | 15 |
| 8 | Gallur | 18 | 5 | 3 | 10 | 25 | 41 | −16 | 13 |
| 9 | Huesca | 18 | 5 | 3 | 10 | 26 | 32 | −6 | 12 (Note: 1 point deducted for fielding ineligible player in 2-2 game at home to Arenas Zaragoza. Win awarded to Arenas.) |
| 10 | Celta de Zaragoza | 18 | 4 | 4 | 10 | 23 | 41 | −18 | 12 |

=== Group VI ===
| Pos | Team | Pld | W | D | L | GF | GA | GD | Pts |
|---|---|---|---|---|---|---|---|---|---|
| 1 | Girona | 20 | 15 | 1 | 4 | 47 | 14 | +33 | 31 |
| 2 | Manresa | 20 | 11 | 4 | 5 | 48 | 29 | +19 | 26 |
| 3 | Sant Andreu | 20 | 11 | 4 | 5 | 37 | 23 | +14 | 26 |
| 4 | Vic | 20 | 10 | 5 | 5 | 27 | 28 | −1 | 25 |
| 5 | Mollet | 20 | 9 | 2 | 9 | 33 | 29 | +4 | 20 |
| 6 | Granollers | 20 | 6 | 7 | 7 | 32 | 37 | −5 | 19 |
| 7 | Mataró | 20 | 8 | 2 | 10 | 33 | 28 | +5 | 18 |
| 8 | Badalona | 20 | 6 | 4 | 10 | 34 | 34 | 0 | 16 |
| 9 | Puig-Reig | 20 | 6 | 2 | 12 | 31 | 51 | −20 | 14 |
| 10 | Montcada | 20 | 5 | 3 | 12 | 25 | 50 | −25 | 13 |
| 11 | Júpiter | 20 | 3 | 6 | 11 | 27 | 51 | −24 | 12 |

=== Group VII ===
| Pos | Team | Pld | W | D | L | GF | GA | GD | Pts |
|---|---|---|---|---|---|---|---|---|---|
| 1 | Gimnàstic de Tarragona | 18 | 10 | 4 | 4 | 38 | 17 | +21 | 24 |
| 2 | Tortosa | 18 | 11 | 2 | 5 | 49 | 34 | +15 | 24 |
| 3 | Hércules Hospitalet | 18 | 9 | 4 | 5 | 30 | 26 | +4 | 22 |
| 4 | Amposta | 18 | 9 | 2 | 7 | 26 | 26 | 0 | 20 |
| 5 | Horta | 18 | 7 | 4 | 7 | 31 | 31 | 0 | 18 |
| 6 | Reus | 18 | 6 | 4 | 8 | 33 | 37 | −4 | 16 |
| 7 | Sants | 18 | 5 | 6 | 7 | 36 | 41 | −5 | 16 |
| 8 | Poble Sec | 18 | 6 | 4 | 8 | 27 | 34 | −7 | 16 |
| 9 | Europa | 18 | 6 | 1 | 11 | 26 | 38 | −12 | 13 |
| 10 | Martinenc | 18 | 5 | 1 | 12 | 20 | 32 | −12 | 11 |

=== Group VIII ===
==== Mallorca ====
| Pos | Team | Pld | W | D | L | GF | GA | GD | Pts |
|---|---|---|---|---|---|---|---|---|---|
| 1 | Mallorca | 14 | 9 | 2 | 3 | 35 | 20 | +15 | 20 |
| 2 | Constància | 14 | 9 | 1 | 4 | 30 | 18 | +12 | 19 |
| 3 | Manacor | 14 | 8 | 2 | 4 | 27 | 18 | +9 | 18 |
| 4 | Poblense | 14 | 6 | 3 | 5 | 22 | 23 | −1 | 15 |
| 5 | Atlético Baleares | 14 | 6 | 2 | 6 | 33 | 25 | +8 | 14 |
| 6 | Binissalem | 14 | 6 | 0 | 8 | 22 | 31 | −9 | 12 |
| 7 | Porreres | 14 | 4 | 2 | 8 | 27 | 36 | −9 | 10 |
| 8 | Santanyí | 14 | 1 | 2 | 11 | 25 | 50 | −25 | 4 |

Note: RCD Mallorca qualified for the Fase Final. Runners-up Constancia played-off against the Menorca sub-group winners for the second spot in the Fase Final.

==== Menorca ====
| Pos | Team | Pld | W | D | L | GF | GA | GD | Pts |
|---|---|---|---|---|---|---|---|---|---|
| 1 | Mahón | 10 | 9 | 0 | 1 | 29 | 8 | +21 | 18 |
| 2 | Minerva | 10 | 5 | 0 | 5 | 28 | 21 | +7 | 10 |
| 3 | Menorca | 10 | 5 | 0 | 5 | 19 | 17 | +2 | 10 |
| 4 | Ciutadella | 10 | 4 | 1 | 5 | 15 | 23 | −8 | 9 |
| 5 | Alaior | 10 | 3 | 1 | 6 | 9 | 20 | −11 | 7 |
| 6 | Mercadal | 10 | 2 | 2 | 6 | 10 | 21 | −11 | 6 |

Note: Mahón qualified for a play-off against the Mallorca sub-group runners-up.

===== Group VIII Final =====
| Team 1 | Agg. | Team 2 | 1st leg | 2nd leg |
|---|---|---|---|---|
| Constància | 1–2 | Mahón | 1–0 | 0–2 |

=== Group IX ===
| Pos | Team | Pld | W | D | L | GF | GA | GD | Pts |
|---|---|---|---|---|---|---|---|---|---|
| 1 | Alcoyano | 18 | 10 | 5 | 3 | 39 | 19 | +20 | 25 |
| 2 | Mestalla | 18 | 11 | 1 | 6 | 47 | 24 | +23 | 23 |
| 3 | Burriana | 18 | 9 | 3 | 6 | 22 | 20 | +2 | 21 |
| 4 | Gandía | 18 | 9 | 2 | 7 | 39 | 41 | −2 | 20 |
| 5 | Alicante | 18 | 7 | 5 | 6 | 42 | 31 | +11 | 19 |
| 6 | Alzira | 18 | 7 | 4 | 7 | 40 | 36 | +4 | 18 |
| 7 | Albacete | 18 | 7 | 2 | 9 | 40 | 40 | 0 | 16 |
| 8 | Soriano | 18 | 7 | 2 | 9 | 38 | 47 | −9 | 16 |
| 9 | Villena | 18 | 4 | 6 | 8 | 31 | 50 | −19 | 14 |
| 10 | Catarroja | 18 | 3 | 2 | 13 | 19 | 49 | −30 | 8 |

=== Group X ===
| Pos | Team | Pld | W | D | L | GF | GA | GD | Pts |
|---|---|---|---|---|---|---|---|---|---|
| 1 | Elche | 18 | 14 | 0 | 4 | 47 | 21 | +26 | 28 |
| 2 | Eldense | 18 | 10 | 5 | 3 | 39 | 26 | +13 | 25 |
| 3 | Hellín | 18 | 10 | 3 | 5 | 46 | 19 | +27 | 23 |
| 4 | Cartagenera | 18 | 10 | 2 | 6 | 56 | 32 | +24 | 22 |
| 5 | Yeclano | 18 | 10 | 0 | 8 | 40 | 33 | +7 | 20 |
| 6 | Lorca | 18 | 8 | 3 | 7 | 31 | 35 | −4 | 19 |
| 7 | Imperial | 18 | 6 | 3 | 9 | 29 | 43 | −14 | 15 |
| 8 | Novelda | 18 | 6 | 2 | 10 | 34 | 44 | −10 | 14 |
| 9 | Aspense | 18 | 3 | 2 | 13 | 27 | 61 | −34 | 8 |
| 10 | Orihuela | 18 | 2 | 2 | 14 | 18 | 53 | −35 | 6 |

=== Group XI ===
| Pos | Team | Pld | W | D | L | GF | GA | GD | Pts |
|---|---|---|---|---|---|---|---|---|---|
| 1 | Cádiz | 18 | 13 | 2 | 3 | 51 | 19 | +32 | 28 |
| 2 | Algeciras | 18 | 12 | 2 | 4 | 55 | 26 | +29 | 26 |
| 3 | Peñarroya | 18 | 11 | 1 | 6 | 52 | 29 | +23 | 23 |
| 4 | Recreativo de Huelva | 18 | 9 | 0 | 9 | 41 | 39 | +2 | 18 |
| 5 | Córdoba | 18 | 8 | 2 | 8 | 35 | 38 | −3 | 18 |
| 6 | Constantina | 18 | 7 | 2 | 9 | 34 | 42 | −8 | 16 |
| 7 | Portuense | 18 | 6 | 3 | 9 | 24 | 32 | −8 | 15 |
| 8 | Lora | 18 | 6 | 3 | 9 | 24 | 36 | −12 | 15 |
| 9 | Utrera | 18 | 6 | 2 | 10 | 33 | 56 | −23 | 14 |
| 10 | Chiclana | 18 | 2 | 3 | 13 | 23 | 55 | −32 | 7 |

=== Group XII ===
| Pos | Team | Pld | W | D | L | GF | GA | GD | Pts |
|---|---|---|---|---|---|---|---|---|---|
| 1 | Úbeda | 18 | 12 | 1 | 5 | 39 | 28 | +11 | 25 |
| 2 | Iliturgi | 18 | 10 | 3 | 5 | 54 | 36 | +18 | 23 |
| 3 | Linares | 18 | 10 | 2 | 6 | 56 | 32 | +24 | 22 |
| 4 | Almería | 18 | 10 | 1 | 7 | 45 | 33 | +12 | 21 |
| 5 | Martos | 18 | 8 | 1 | 9 | 38 | 38 | 0 | 17 |
| 6 | Motril | 18 | 8 | 1 | 9 | 37 | 44 | −7 | 17 |
| 7 | Atlético Malagueño | 18 | 6 | 4 | 8 | 37 | 44 | −7 | 16 |
| 8 | Recreativo de Granada | 18 | 6 | 4 | 8 | 33 | 40 | −7 | 16 |
| 9 | Antequerano | 18 | 5 | 3 | 10 | 36 | 50 | −14 | 13 |
| 10 | Atlético Bastetano | 18 | 4 | 2 | 12 | 24 | 54 | −30 | 10 |

=== Group XIII ===
| Pos | Team | Pld | W | D | L | GF | GA | GD | Pts |
|---|---|---|---|---|---|---|---|---|---|
| 1 | Ceuta | 16 | 13 | 2 | 1 | 53 | 14 | +39 | 28 |
| 2 | Melilla | 16 | 10 | 3 | 3 | 36 | 16 | +20 | 23 |
| 3 | Larache | 16 | 7 | 3 | 6 | 29 | 24 | +5 | 17 |
| 4 | Villa de Nador | 16 | 6 | 5 | 5 | 24 | 25 | −1 | 17 |
| 5 | Alcázar | 16 | 6 | 3 | 7 | 23 | 31 | −8 | 15 |
| 6 | África Ceutí | 16 | 6 | 1 | 9 | 24 | 24 | 0 | 13 |
| 7 | Español de Tetuán | 16 | 4 | 5 | 7 | 19 | 38 | −19 | 13 |
| 8 | Unión Tangerina | 16 | 4 | 3 | 9 | 15 | 28 | −13 | 11 |
| 9 | Pescadores | 16 | 2 | 3 | 11 | 18 | 41 | −23 | 7 |

=== Group XIV ===
| Pos | Team | Pld | W | D | L | GF | GA | GD | Pts |
|---|---|---|---|---|---|---|---|---|---|
| 1 | Don Benito | 18 | 13 | 1 | 4 | 64 | 25 | +39 | 27 |
| 2 | Emeritense | 18 | 11 | 3 | 4 | 52 | 24 | +28 | 25 |
| 3 | Manchego | 18 | 12 | 1 | 5 | 54 | 23 | +31 | 25 |
| 4 | Calvo Sotelo | 18 | 9 | 3 | 6 | 48 | 28 | +20 | 21 |
| 5 | Villanovense | 18 | 9 | 2 | 7 | 35 | 32 | +3 | 20 |
| 6 | Cacereño | 18 | 9 | 1 | 8 | 43 | 36 | +7 | 19 |
| 7 | Metalúrgica Extremeña | 18 | 5 | 3 | 10 | 25 | 48 | −23 | 13 |
| 8 | Azuaga | 18 | 5 | 1 | 12 | 29 | 63 | −34 | 11 |
| 9 | Plasencia | 18 | 3 | 4 | 11 | 22 | 64 | −42 | 10 |
| 10 | Montijo | 18 | 3 | 3 | 12 | 32 | 61 | −29 | 9 |

=== Group XV ===
| Pos | Team | Pld | W | D | L | GF | GA | GD | Pts |
|---|---|---|---|---|---|---|---|---|---|
| 1 | Europa Delicias | 18 | 13 | 1 | 4 | 50 | 17 | +33 | 27 |
| 2 | Salamanca | 18 | 11 | 4 | 3 | 45 | 22 | +23 | 26 |
| 3 | Ponferradina | 18 | 11 | 3 | 4 | 42 | 21 | +21 | 25 |
| 4 | Júpiter Leonés | 18 | 9 | 4 | 5 | 44 | 23 | +21 | 22 |
| 5 | Atlético Palentino | 18 | 6 | 7 | 5 | 40 | 38 | +2 | 19 |
| 6 | Atlético Zamora | 18 | 8 | 2 | 8 | 20 | 27 | −7 | 18 |
| 7 | Gimnástica Segoviana | 18 | 5 | 5 | 8 | 28 | 36 | −8 | 15 |
| 8 | Salesianos | 18 | 5 | 4 | 9 | 28 | 37 | −9 | 14 |
| 9 | Ávila | 18 | 5 | 1 | 12 | 30 | 35 | −5 | 11 |
| 10 | Unión Castilla | 18 | 1 | 1 | 16 | 11 | 82 | −71 | 3 |

=== Group XVI ===
| Pos | Team | Pld | W | D | L | GF | GA | GD | Pts |
|---|---|---|---|---|---|---|---|---|---|
| 1 | Plus Ultra | 18 | 12 | 2 | 4 | 47 | 25 | +22 | 26 |
| 2 | Rayo Vallecano | 18 | 9 | 5 | 4 | 37 | 16 | +21 | 23 |
| 3 | Real Aranjuez | 18 | 9 | 2 | 7 | 45 | 31 | +14 | 20 |
| 4 | Cuatro Caminos | 18 | 7 | 4 | 7 | 34 | 39 | −5 | 18 |
| 5 | Leganés | 18 | 7 | 3 | 8 | 43 | 46 | −3 | 17 |
| 6 | San Lorenzo | 18 | 6 | 5 | 7 | 35 | 38 | −3 | 17 |
| 7 | Girod | 18 | 8 | 1 | 9 | 33 | 39 | −6 | 17 |
| 8 | Toledo | 18 | 6 | 4 | 8 | 35 | 41 | −6 | 16 |
| 9 | Conquense | 18 | 5 | 3 | 10 | 21 | 34 | −13 | 13 |
| 10 | Guadalajara | 18 | 3 | 7 | 8 | 25 | 46 | −21 | 13 |

== Promotion play-offs ==
=== Group I ===
| Pos | Team | Pld | W | D | L | GF | GA | GD | Pts |
|---|---|---|---|---|---|---|---|---|---|
| 1 | Indautxu | 14 | 8 | 3 | 3 | 31 | 13 | +18 | 19 |
| 2 | Langreano | 14 | 8 | 1 | 5 | 31 | 27 | +4 | 17 |
| 3 | Arsenal | 14 | 6 | 3 | 5 | 25 | 23 | +2 | 15 |
| 4 | Salamanca | 14 | 5 | 5 | 4 | 22 | 19 | +3 | 15 |
| 5 | Gimnástica de Torrelavega | 14 | 5 | 4 | 5 | 18 | 21 | −3 | 14 |
| 6 | Europa Delicias | 14 | 4 | 5 | 5 | 14 | 18 | −4 | 13 |
| 7 | Burgos | 14 | 3 | 5 | 6 | 27 | 37 | −10 | 11 |
| 8 | Pontevedra | 14 | 3 | 2 | 9 | 21 | 31 | −10 | 8 |

=== Group II ===
| Pos | Team | Pld | W | D | L | GF | GA | GD | Pts |
|---|---|---|---|---|---|---|---|---|---|
| 1 | Plus Ultra | 14 | 9 | 1 | 4 | 32 | 23 | +9 | 19 |
| 2 | Manresa | 14 | 6 | 4 | 4 | 36 | 20 | +16 | 16 |
| 3 | Girona | 14 | 8 | 0 | 6 | 37 | 24 | +13 | 16 |
| 4 | Arenas | 14 | 7 | 2 | 5 | 23 | 19 | +4 | 16 |
| 5 | Elgoibar | 14 | 6 | 2 | 6 | 31 | 31 | 0 | 14 |
| 6 | Tudelano | 14 | 4 | 5 | 5 | 27 | 32 | −5 | 13 |
| 7 | Binéfar | 14 | 4 | 2 | 8 | 21 | 41 | −20 | 10 |
| 8 | Rayo Vallecano | 14 | 3 | 2 | 9 | 26 | 43 | −17 | 8 |

=== Group III ===
| Pos | Team | Pld | W | D | L | GF | GA | GD | Pts |
|---|---|---|---|---|---|---|---|---|---|
| 1 | Mestalla | 14 | 9 | 2 | 3 | 39 | 16 | +23 | 20 |
| 2 | Eldense | 14 | 7 | 4 | 3 | 27 | 17 | +10 | 18 |
| 3 | Alcoyano | 14 | 7 | 2 | 5 | 19 | 21 | −2 | 16 |
| 4 | Tortosa | 14 | 6 | 2 | 6 | 25 | 22 | +3 | 14 |
| 5 | Gimnàstic de Tarragona | 14 | 7 | 0 | 7 | 24 | 23 | +1 | 14 |
| 6 | Mahón | 14 | 4 | 3 | 7 | 15 | 27 | −12 | 11 |
| 7 | Elche | 14 | 5 | 0 | 9 | 20 | 32 | −12 | 10 |
| 8 | Mallorca | 14 | 4 | 1 | 9 | 22 | 33 | −11 | 9 |

=== Group IV ===
| Pos | Team | Pld | W | D | L | GF | GA | GD | Pts |
|---|---|---|---|---|---|---|---|---|---|
| 1 | Cádiz | 14 | 9 | 1 | 4 | 32 | 14 | +18 | 19 |
| 2 | Algeciras | 14 | 7 | 2 | 5 | 28 | 25 | +3 | 16 |
| 3 | Ceuta | 14 | 6 | 2 | 6 | 30 | 21 | +9 | 14 |
| 4 | Emeritense | 14 | 5 | 3 | 6 | 27 | 33 | −6 | 13 |
| 5 | Don Benito | 14 | 4 | 5 | 5 | 28 | 34 | −6 | 13 |
| 6 | Melilla | 14 | 6 | 1 | 7 | 24 | 22 | +2 | 13 |
| 7 | Úbeda | 14 | 6 | 0 | 8 | 28 | 32 | −4 | 12 |
| 8 | Iliturgi | 14 | 6 | 0 | 8 | 21 | 37 | −16 | 12 |

== Relegation play-offs ==
=== Group I ===
| Pos | Team | Pld | W | D | L | GF | GA | GD | Pts | Qualification or relegation |
|---|---|---|---|---|---|---|---|---|---|---|
| 1 | Ourense | 18 | 13 | 2 | 3 | 47 | 34 | +13 | 28 | Remain in Tercera |
| 2 | Juvenil | 18 | 11 | 2 | 5 | 48 | 27 | +21 | 24 | Promoted to Tercera |
| 3 | Turista | 18 | 10 | 4 | 4 | 51 | 30 | +21 | 24 | Remain in Tercera |
| 4 | Lugo | 18 | 8 | 4 | 6 | 41 | 25 | +16 | 20 | Remain in Tercera |
| 5 | Fabril | 18 | 9 | 2 | 7 | 52 | 35 | +17 | 20 | Remain in Tercera |
| 6 | Lemos | 18 | 9 | 0 | 9 | 31 | 53 | −22 | 18 | Remain in Tercera |
| 7 | Brigantium | 18 | 8 | 1 | 9 | 38 | 47 | −9 | 17 | Promoted to Tercera |
| 8 | Marín | 18 | 7 | 0 | 11 | 35 | 44 | −9 | 13 (Note: 1 point deducted) | Relegated to Regional |
| 9 | Arosa | 18 | 4 | 2 | 12 | 28 | 49 | −21 | 9 | Relegated to Regional |
| 10 | Santiago | 18 | 0 | 5 | 13 | 32 | 59 | −27 | 2 (Note: 3 points deducted) | Relegated to Regional |

=== Group II ===
| Pos | Team | Pld | W | D | L | GF | GA | GD | Pts | Qualification or relegation |
|---|---|---|---|---|---|---|---|---|---|---|
| 1 | Turón | 18 | 10 | 3 | 5 | 32 | 20 | +12 | 23 | Remain in Tercera |
| 2 | Calzada | 18 | 9 | 4 | 5 | 33 | 24 | +9 | 22 | Remain in Tercera |
| 3 | Santoña | 18 | 10 | 1 | 7 | 36 | 33 | +3 | 21 | Remain in Tercera |
| 4 | Rayo Cantabria | 18 | 8 | 4 | 6 | 36 | 22 | +14 | 20 | Remain in Tercera |
| 5 | Juvencia | 18 | 8 | 4 | 6 | 33 | 28 | +5 | 20 | Remain in Tercera |
| 6 | Titánico | 18 | 9 | 1 | 8 | 37 | 35 | +2 | 19 | Remain in Tercera |
| 7 | El Entrego | 18 | 7 | 3 | 8 | 37 | 32 | +5 | 17 | Promoted to Tercera |
| 8 | San Martín | 18 | 6 | 4 | 8 | 24 | 27 | −3 | 16 | Relegated to Regional |
| 9 | Laredo | 18 | 5 | 3 | 10 | 25 | 41 | −16 | 13 | Relegated to Regional |
| 10 | Barreda | 18 | 4 | 1 | 13 | 23 | 54 | −31 | 9 | Remain in Regional |

=== Group III ===
| Pos | Team | Pld | W | D | L | GF | GA | GD | Pts | Qualification or relegation |
|---|---|---|---|---|---|---|---|---|---|---|
| 1 | Baskonia | 22 | 14 | 3 | 5 | 42 | 26 | +16 | 31 | Remain in Tercera |
| 2 | Getxo | 22 | 11 | 7 | 4 | 42 | 24 | +18 | 29 | Remain in Tercera |
| 3 | Balmaseda | 22 | 11 | 4 | 7 | 41 | 36 | +5 | 26 | Promoted to Tercera |
| 4 | Begoña | 22 | 10 | 4 | 8 | 30 | 37 | −7 | 24 | Remain in Tercera |
| 5 | Arenas de Getxo | 22 | 9 | 5 | 8 | 37 | 32 | +5 | 23 | Remain in Tercera |
| 6 | Durango | 22 | 9 | 5 | 8 | 40 | 38 | +2 | 23 | Promoted to Tercera |
| 7 | Mirandés | 22 | 8 | 6 | 8 | 40 | 37 | +3 | 22 | Remain in Tercera |
| 8 | Villosa | 22 | 6 | 7 | 9 | 37 | 40 | −3 | 19 | Remain in Tercera |
| 9 | Padura | 22 | 7 | 4 | 11 | 35 | 49 | −14 | 18 | Promoted to Tercera |
| 10 | Erandio | 22 | 6 | 6 | 10 | 24 | 33 | −9 | 18 | Remain in Tercera |
| 11 | Bermeo | 22 | 6 | 5 | 11 | 38 | 41 | −3 | 17 | Promoted to Tercera |
| 12 | Portugalete | 22 | 5 | 4 | 13 | 24 | 37 | −13 | 14 | Remain in Tercera |

=== Group IV ===
| Pos | Team | Pld | W | D | L | GF | GA | GD | Pts | Qualification or relegation |
|---|---|---|---|---|---|---|---|---|---|---|
| 1 | Touring | 18 | 13 | 1 | 4 | 39 | 25 | +14 | 27 | Promoted to Tercera |
| 2 | Villafranca | 18 | 10 | 1 | 7 | 33 | 32 | +1 | 21 | Remain in Tercera |
| 3 | Mondragón | 18 | 10 | 1 | 7 | 43 | 33 | +10 | 21 | Remain in Tercera |
| 4 | Recreación de Logroño | 18 | 9 | 2 | 7 | 35 | 31 | +4 | 20 | Remain in Tercera |
| 5 | Izarra | 18 | 7 | 5 | 6 | 41 | 30 | +11 | 19 | Remain in Tercera |
| 6 | Peña Sport | 18 | 7 | 4 | 7 | 33 | 37 | −4 | 18 | Remain in Tercera |
| 7 | Azkoyen | 18 | 6 | 5 | 7 | 31 | 27 | +4 | 17 | Remain in Tercera |
| 8 | Oberena | 18 | 5 | 6 | 7 | 29 | 35 | −6 | 16 | Promoted to Tercera |
| 9 | Calahorra | 18 | 3 | 5 | 10 | 20 | 41 | −21 | 11 | Remain in Tercera |
| 10 | Anaitasuna | 18 | 3 | 4 | 11 | 24 | 37 | −13 | 10 | Relegated to Regional |

=== Group V ===
| Pos | Team | Pld | W | D | L | GF | GA | GD | Pts | Qualification or relegation |
|---|---|---|---|---|---|---|---|---|---|---|
| 1 | Calatayud | 18 | 12 | 2 | 4 | 48 | 24 | +24 | 26 | Remain in Tercera |
| 2 | Montañanesa | 18 | 10 | 3 | 5 | 38 | 27 | +11 | 23 | Remain in Tercera |
| 3 | Gallur | 18 | 10 | 2 | 6 | 32 | 24 | +8 | 22 | Remain in Tercera |
| 4 | Numancia | 18 | 8 | 4 | 6 | 34 | 23 | +11 | 20 | Remain in Tercera |
| 5 | Celta de Zaragoza | 18 | 8 | 4 | 6 | 33 | 33 | 0 | 20 | Remain in Tercera |
| 6 | Utebo | 18 | 7 | 3 | 8 | 37 | 27 | +10 | 17 | Remain in Tercera |
| 7 | Huesca | 18 | 7 | 2 | 9 | 26 | 31 | −5 | 16 | Remain in Tercera |
| 8 | Amistad | 18 | 6 | 3 | 9 | 37 | 52 | −15 | 15 | Remain in Tercera |
| 9 | Tauste | 18 | 5 | 2 | 11 | 26 | 45 | −19 | 12 | Promoted to Tercera |
| 10 | Alagón | 18 | 2 | 5 | 11 | 17 | 42 | −25 | 9 | Remain in Regional |

=== Group VI ===
| Pos | Team | Pld | W | D | L | GF | GA | GD | Pts | Qualification or relegation |
|---|---|---|---|---|---|---|---|---|---|---|
| 1 | Sant Andreu | 22 | 12 | 4 | 6 | 65 | 32 | +33 | 28 | Remain in Tercera |
| 2 | Artiguense | 22 | 11 | 5 | 6 | 37 | 36 | +1 | 27 | Promoted to Tercera |
| 3 | Mataró | 22 | 11 | 5 | 6 | 48 | 38 | +10 | 27 | Remain in Tercera |
| 4 | Vic | 22 | 11 | 5 | 6 | 37 | 31 | +6 | 27 | Remain in Tercera |
| 5 | Mollet | 22 | 11 | 2 | 9 | 38 | 34 | +4 | 24 | Remain in Tercera |
| 6 | Montcada | 22 | 11 | 2 | 9 | 48 | 39 | +9 | 24 | Remain in Tercera |
| 7 | Puig-Reig | 22 | 9 | 4 | 9 | 53 | 51 | +2 | 22 | Remain in Tercera |
| 8 | Granollers | 22 | 8 | 5 | 9 | 47 | 44 | +3 | 21 | Remain in Tercera |
| 9 | Badalona | 22 | 8 | 5 | 9 | 41 | 43 | −2 | 21 | Remain in Tercera |
| 10 | Júpiter | 22 | 7 | 7 | 8 | 42 | 48 | −6 | 21 | Remain in Tercera |
| 11 | Manlleu | 22 | 5 | 2 | 15 | 35 | 59 | −24 | 12 | Remain in Regional |
| 12 | Guíxols | 22 | 4 | 2 | 16 | 28 | 64 | −36 | 10 | Remain in Regional |

=== Group VII ===
| Pos | Team | Pld | W | D | L | GF | GA | GD | Pts | Qualification or relegation |
|---|---|---|---|---|---|---|---|---|---|---|
| 1 | Hércules Hospitalet | 18 | 11 | 2 | 5 | 45 | 26 | +19 | 24 | Remain in Tercera |
| 2 | Martinenc | 18 | 9 | 5 | 4 | 31 | 21 | +10 | 23 | Remain in Tercera |
| 3 | Amposta | 18 | 10 | 2 | 6 | 41 | 38 | +3 | 22 | Remain in Tercera |
| 4 | Horta | 18 | 8 | 4 | 6 | 37 | 31 | +6 | 20 | Remain in Tercera |
| 5 | Reus | 18 | 8 | 3 | 7 | 40 | 31 | +9 | 19 | Remain in Tercera |
| 6 | Sants | 18 | 8 | 2 | 8 | 41 | 42 | −1 | 18 | Remain in Tercera |
| 7 | Europa | 18 | 7 | 3 | 8 | 32 | 33 | −1 | 17 | Remain in Tercera |
| 8 | La Cava | 18 | 7 | 3 | 8 | 38 | 40 | −2 | 17 | Promoted to Tercera |
| 9 | Poble Nou | 18 | 5 | 2 | 11 | 24 | 44 | −20 | 12 | Promoted to Tercera |
| 10 | Poble Sec | 18 | 3 | 2 | 13 | 25 | 48 | −23 | 8 | Relegated to Regional |

=== Group VIII ===
| Pos | Team | Pld | W | D | L | GF | GA | GD | Pts | Qualification or relegation |
|---|---|---|---|---|---|---|---|---|---|---|
| 1 | Poblense | 18 | 11 | 4 | 3 | 43 | 23 | +20 | 26 | Remain in Tercera |
| 2 | Porreres | 18 | 12 | 0 | 6 | 45 | 36 | +9 | 24 | Remain in Tercera |
| 3 | Constància | 18 | 10 | 2 | 6 | 37 | 26 | +11 | 22 | Remain in Tercera |
| 4 | Manacor | 18 | 10 | 1 | 7 | 45 | 23 | +22 | 21 | Remain in Tercera |
| 5 | Atlético Baleares | 18 | 10 | 1 | 7 | 55 | 41 | +14 | 21 | Remain in Tercera |
| 6 | Binissalem | 18 | 9 | 2 | 7 | 40 | 26 | +14 | 20 | Remain in Tercera |
| 7 | Santanyí | 18 | 7 | 2 | 9 | 42 | 49 | −7 | 16 | Remain in Tercera |
| 8 | España | 18 | 6 | 2 | 10 | 24 | 59 | −35 | 14 | Promoted to Tercera |
| 9 | Soledad | 18 | 3 | 4 | 11 | 21 | 43 | −22 | 10 | Promoted to Tercera |
| 10 | Felanitx | 18 | 2 | 2 | 14 | 30 | 56 | −26 | 6 | Remain in Regional |

=== Group IX ===
| Pos | Team | Pld | W | D | L | GF | GA | GD | Pts | Qualification or relegation |
|---|---|---|---|---|---|---|---|---|---|---|
| 1 | Albacete | 18 | 10 | 4 | 4 | 44 | 17 | +27 | 24 | Remain in Tercera |
| 2 | Soriano | 18 | 10 | 3 | 5 | 46 | 31 | +15 | 23 | Remain in Tercera |
| 3 | Gandía | 18 | 10 | 3 | 5 | 35 | 30 | +5 | 23 | Remain in Tercera |
| 4 | Alicante | 18 | 9 | 3 | 6 | 36 | 25 | +11 | 21 | Remain in Tercera |
| 5 | Burriana | 18 | 9 | 0 | 9 | 29 | 32 | −3 | 18 | Remain in Tercera |
| 6 | Acero | 18 | 8 | 2 | 8 | 38 | 36 | +2 | 18 | Promoted to Tercera |
| 7 | Ontinyent | 18 | 8 | 2 | 8 | 36 | 31 | +5 | 18 | Remain in Tercera |
| 8 | Alzira | 18 | 7 | 3 | 8 | 27 | 44 | −17 | 17 | Remain in Tercera |
| 9 | Villena | 18 | 5 | 4 | 9 | 19 | 39 | −20 | 14 | Relegated to Regional |
| 10 | Catarroja | 18 | 2 | 0 | 16 | 19 | 44 | −25 | 4 | Relegated to Regional |

=== Group X ===
| Pos | Team | Pld | W | D | L | GF | GA | GD | Pts | Qualification or relegation |
|---|---|---|---|---|---|---|---|---|---|---|
| 1 | Hellín | 20 | 11 | 4 | 5 | 68 | 32 | +36 | 26 | Remain in Tercera |
| 2 | Yeclano | 20 | 12 | 0 | 8 | 46 | 35 | +11 | 24 | Remain in Tercera |
| 3 | Cieza | 20 | 9 | 2 | 9 | 38 | 56 | −18 | 20 | Promoted to Tercera |
| 4 | Lorca | 20 | 10 | 0 | 10 | 57 | 40 | +17 | 20 | Remain in Tercera |
| 5 | Cartagenera | 20 | 9 | 2 | 9 | 46 | 44 | +2 | 20 | Remain in Tercera |
| 6 | Novelda | 20 | 9 | 2 | 9 | 35 | 33 | +2 | 20 | Remain in Tercera |
| 7 | Almansa | 20 | 9 | 2 | 9 | 37 | 59 | −22 | 20 | Promoted to Tercera |
| 8 | Callosa | 20 | 9 | 1 | 10 | 45 | 30 | +15 | 19 | Promoted to Tercera |
| 9 | Imperial | 20 | 9 | 0 | 11 | 51 | 45 | +6 | 18 | Remain in Tercera |
| 10 | Orihuela | 20 | 7 | 3 | 10 | 46 | 65 | −19 | 17 | Remain in Tercera |
| 11 | Aspense | 20 | 7 | 2 | 11 | 38 | 68 | −30 | 16 | Relegated to Regional |

=== Group XI ===
| Pos | Team | Pld | W | D | L | GF | GA | GD | Pts | Qualification or relegation |
|---|---|---|---|---|---|---|---|---|---|---|
| 1 | Peñarroya | 18 | 11 | 2 | 5 | 45 | 23 | +22 | 24 | Remain in Tercera |
| 2 | Chiclana | 18 | 10 | 3 | 5 | 25 | 15 | +10 | 23 | Remain in Tercera |
| 3 | Recreativo de Huelva | 18 | 8 | 4 | 6 | 31 | 24 | +7 | 20 | Remain in Tercera |
| 4 | Portuense | 18 | 8 | 2 | 8 | 35 | 31 | +4 | 18 | Remain in Tercera |
| 5 | Utrera | 18 | 8 | 2 | 8 | 29 | 29 | 0 | 18 | Remain in Tercera |
| 6 | Coria | 18 | 8 | 1 | 9 | 31 | 30 | +1 | 17 | Promoted to Tercera |
| 7 | Córdoba | 18 | 7 | 2 | 9 | 32 | 35 | −3 | 16 | Remain in Tercera |
| 8 | Lora | 18 | 6 | 3 | 9 | 23 | 36 | −13 | 15 | Remain in Tercera |
| 9 | Constantina | 18 | 8 | 1 | 9 | 22 | 33 | −11 | 15 (Note: 2 points deducted. Constantina did not travel to Lora.) | Remain in Tercera |
| 10 | Puerto Real | 18 | 6 | 0 | 12 | 24 | 41 | −17 | 12 | Remain in Regional |

=== Group XII ===
| Pos | Team | Pld | W | D | L | GF | GA | GD | Pts | Qualification or relegation |
|---|---|---|---|---|---|---|---|---|---|---|
| 1 | Linares | 18 | 9 | 4 | 5 | 42 | 24 | +18 | 22 | Remain in Tercera |
| 2 | Antequerano | 18 | 10 | 1 | 7 | 52 | 33 | +19 | 21 | Remain in Tercera |
| 3 | Almería | 18 | 9 | 2 | 7 | 42 | 28 | +14 | 20 | Remain in Tercera |
| 4 | Recreativo de Granada | 18 | 9 | 1 | 8 | 48 | 33 | +15 | 19 | Remain in Tercera |
| 5 | Motril | 18 | 8 | 2 | 8 | 38 | 32 | +6 | 18 | Remain in Tercera |
| 6 | Atlético Bastetano | 18 | 8 | 1 | 9 | 24 | 42 | −18 | 17 | Remain in Tercera |
| 7 | Martos | 18 | 8 | 1 | 9 | 27 | 38 | −11 | 17 | Remain in Tercera |
| 8 | Ronda | 18 | 6 | 4 | 8 | 26 | 39 | −13 | 16 | Promoted to Tercera |
| 9 | Atlético Malagueño | 18 | 7 | 1 | 10 | 26 | 37 | −11 | 15 | Remain in Tercera |
| 10 | Villa del Río | 18 | 5 | 5 | 8 | 20 | 39 | −19 | 15 | Remain in Regional |

=== Group XIII ===
==== Occidental ====
| Pos | Team | Pld | W | D | L | GF | GA | GD | Pts | Qualification or relegation |
|---|---|---|---|---|---|---|---|---|---|---|
| 1 | Español de Tetuán | 12 | 8 | 3 | 1 | 44 | 20 | +24 | 19 | Remain in Tercera |
| 2 | Larache | 12 | 9 | 1 | 2 | 35 | 18 | +17 | 19 | Remain in Tercera |
| 3 | África Ceutí | 12 | 6 | 3 | 3 | 19 | 14 | +5 | 15 | Remain in Tercera |
| 4 | Unión Tangerina | 12 | 6 | 2 | 4 | 21 | 17 | +4 | 14 | Remain in Tercera |
| 5 | Alcázar | 12 | 2 | 3 | 7 | 27 | 38 | −11 | 7 | Remain in Tercera |
| 6 | Alcazaba | 12 | 2 | 2 | 8 | 11 | 25 | −14 | 6 | Promoted to Tercera |
| 7 | Rabita Riadi | 12 | 1 | 2 | 9 | 10 | 35 | −25 | 4 | Remain in Regional |

==== Oriental ====
| Pos | Team | Pld | W | D | L | GF | GA | GD | Pts | Qualification or relegation |
|---|---|---|---|---|---|---|---|---|---|---|
| 1 | Villa de Nador | 6 | 4 | 1 | 1 | 7 | 3 | +4 | 9 | Remain in Tercera |
| 2 | Pescadores | 6 | 4 | 1 | 1 | 13 | 6 | +7 | 9 | Remain in Tercera |
| 3 | Tesorillo | 6 | 2 | 0 | 4 | 10 | 17 | −7 | 4 | Remain in Regional |
| 4 | Villa de Sanjurjo | 6 | 1 | 0 | 5 | 10 | 14 | −4 | 2 | Remain in Regional |

=== Group XIV ===
| Pos | Team | Pld | W | D | L | GF | GA | GD | Pts | Qualification or relegation |
|---|---|---|---|---|---|---|---|---|---|---|
| 1 | Manchego | 18 | 11 | 3 | 4 | 69 | 25 | +44 | 25 | Remain in Tercera |
| 2 | Villanovense | 18 | 12 | 1 | 5 | 45 | 32 | +13 | 25 | Remain in Tercera |
| 3 | Calvo Sotelo | 18 | 10 | 0 | 8 | 58 | 39 | +19 | 20 | Remain in Tercera |
| 4 | Cacereño | 18 | 10 | 0 | 8 | 62 | 39 | +23 | 20 | Remain in Tercera |
| 5 | Montijo | 18 | 10 | 0 | 8 | 39 | 35 | +4 | 20 | Remain in Tercera |
| 6 | Azuaga | 18 | 8 | 2 | 8 | 59 | 50 | +9 | 18 | Remain in Tercera |
| 7 | Plasencia | 18 | 8 | 1 | 9 | 39 | 44 | −5 | 17 | Remain in Tercera |
| 8 | Metalúrgica Extremeña | 18 | 6 | 2 | 10 | 38 | 69 | −31 | 14 | Remain in Tercera |
| 9 | Ferrocarril | 18 | 5 | 2 | 11 | 21 | 46 | −25 | 12 | Remain in Regional |
| 10 | Herencia | 18 | 3 | 3 | 12 | 27 | 78 | −51 | 8 (Note: 1 point deducted) | Remain in Regional |

=== Group XV ===
| Pos | Team | Pld | W | D | L | GF | GA | GD | Pts | Qualification or relegation |
|---|---|---|---|---|---|---|---|---|---|---|
| 1 | Ávila | 18 | 11 | 2 | 5 | 47 | 34 | +13 | 24 | Remain in Tercera |
| 2 | Atlético Palentino | 18 | 9 | 5 | 4 | 48 | 27 | +21 | 23 | Remain in Tercera |
| 3 | Júpiter Leonés | 18 | 10 | 1 | 7 | 51 | 30 | +21 | 21 | Remain in Tercera |
| 4 | Ponferradina | 18 | 10 | 1 | 7 | 41 | 25 | +16 | 21 | Remain in Tercera |
| 5 | Gimnástica Segoviana | 18 | 7 | 4 | 7 | 52 | 35 | +17 | 18 | Remain in Tercera |
| 6 | Unión Castilla | 18 | 8 | 2 | 8 | 31 | 53 | −22 | 18 | Remain in Tercera |
| 7 | Béjar Industrial | 18 | 7 | 2 | 9 | 38 | 47 | −9 | 16 | Promoted to Tercera |
| 8 | Atlético Zamora | 18 | 6 | 4 | 8 | 35 | 44 | −9 | 16 | Remain in Tercera |
| 9 | Salesianos | 18 | 5 | 2 | 11 | 28 | 49 | −21 | 12 | Relegated to Regional |
| 10 | Juventud | 18 | 3 | 5 | 10 | 32 | 59 | −27 | 11 | Remain in Regional |

=== Group XVI ===
| Pos | Team | Pld | W | D | L | GF | GA | GD | Pts | Qualification or relegation |
|---|---|---|---|---|---|---|---|---|---|---|
| 1 | Real Aranjuez | 18 | 12 | 3 | 3 | 48 | 25 | +23 | 27 | Remain in Tercera |
| 2 | Conquense | 18 | 10 | 0 | 8 | 32 | 33 | −1 | 20 | Remain in Tercera |
| 3 | Parque Móvil | 18 | 9 | 1 | 8 | 34 | 29 | +5 | 19 | Promoted to Tercera |
| 4 | Guadalajara | 18 | 9 | 1 | 8 | 47 | 44 | +3 | 19 | Remain in Tercera |
| 5 | Toledo | 18 | 9 | 1 | 8 | 52 | 34 | +18 | 19 | Remain in Tercera |
| 6 | Girod | 18 | 7 | 4 | 7 | 33 | 30 | +3 | 18 | Remain in Tercera |
| 7 | Leganés | 18 | 8 | 1 | 9 | 37 | 44 | −7 | 17 | Remain in Tercera |
| 8 | Cuatro Caminos | 18 | 8 | 1 | 9 | 43 | 45 | −2 | 17 | Remain in Tercera |
| 9 | Carabanchel | 18 | 7 | 1 | 10 | 29 | 43 | −14 | 15 | Promoted to Tercera |
| 10 | San Lorenzo | 18 | 4 | 1 | 13 | 30 | 67 | −37 | 8 (Note: 1 point deducted. San Lorenzo fielded an ineligible player in a 2-2 draw at Conquense. Win awarded to Conquense.) | Relegated to Regional |

== Season records ==
- Most wins: 15, Girona.
- Most draws: 7, Granollers, Atlético Palentino and Guadalajara.
- Most losses: 16, Unión Castilla.
- Most goals for: 64, Don Benito.
- Most goals against: 82, Unión Castilla.
- Most points: 31, Girona.
- Fewest wins: 1, Santanyí and Unión Castilla.
- Fewest draws: 0, 8 teams.
- Fewest losses: 1, Mahón and Ceuta.
- Fewest goals for: 9, Alaior.
- Fewest goals against: 8, Mahón.
- Fewest points: 3, Unión Castilla.
