= 1951–52 Tercera División =

Tercera División
- Season: 1951–52

The 1951–52 Tercera División season was the 16th since its establishment.

== Format ==
16 clubs in 6 geographic groups (96 clubs) participated. Three withdrew before the end of the season. The 6 group winners were promoted to the Segunda División. It had been planned to reorganise the Segunda and Tercera Divisiónes but the plan was never implemented and the Promotion play-offs had no consequence. The bottom three clubs in Groups I and II of the Segunda División were relegated and no other Tercera División clubs were promoted.

== League tables ==
=== Group I ===
Pos	Team	Pld	W	D	L	GF	GA	GD	Pts
1	Real Avilés	30	17	8	5	66	24	+42	42
2	La Felguera	30	17	6	7	68	40	+28	40
3	Cultural Leonesa	30	16	7	7	63	40	+23	39
4	Arosa	30	18	1	11	71	50	+21	37
5	Pontevedra	30	15	6	9	61	51	+10	36
6	Atlético de Zamora	30	14	5	11	65	45	+20	33
7	Lemos	30	15	3	12	43	58	−15	33
8	Arsenal	30	15	1	14	61	51	+10	31
9	Vetusta	30	13	5	12	45	46	−1	31
10	Ponferradina	30	13	3	14	64	60	+4	29
11	Santiago	30	11	7	12	52	49	+3	29
12	Langreano	30	10	8	12	61	64	−3	28
13	Real Juvencia	30	8	6	16	53	97	−44	22
14	Calzada	30	9	2	19	50	68	−18	20
15	Juvenil	30	7	4	19	50	68	−18	18
16	Polvorín	30	4	4	22	42	104	−62	12

=== Group II ===
Pos	Team	Pld	W	D	L	GF	GA	GD	Pts
1	Burgos	30	16	8	6	75	42	+33	40
2	Eibar	30	18	3	9	68	38	+30	39
3	Rayo Cantabria	30	13	8	9	48	39	+9	34
4	Recreación de Logroño	30	16	2	12	59	57	+2	34
5	Getxo	30	13	7	10	52	37	+15	33
6	Mirandés	30	14	4	12	57	48	+9	32
7	Arenas de Zaragoza	29	14	4	11	50	50	0	32
8	Portugalete	30	12	6	12	54	55	−1	30
9	Sestao	30	12	5	13	54	55	−1	29
10	Baskonia	30	11	7	12	43	49	−6	29
11	Izarra	30	12	4	14	51	70	−19	28
12	Numancia	29	10	6	13	64	55	+9	26
13	Erandio	30	9	8	13	29	53	−24	26
14	Calahorra	30	10	4	16	42	67	−25	24
15	Indautxu	30	8	6	16	50	59	−9	22
16	Arenas de Getxo	30	8	4	18	42	64	−22	20

=== Group III ===
Pos	Team	Pld	W	D	L	GF	GA	GD	Pts
1	España Industrial	30	21	4	5	71	33	+38	46
2	Tortosa	30	19	2	9	72	44	+28	40
3	Escoriaza	30	18	2	10	90	43	+47	38
4	Manresa	30	17	4	9	68	35	+33	38
5	Terrassa	30	17	4	9	60	51	+9	38
6	Girona	30	17	2	11	72	44	+28	36
7	Granollers	30	15	4	11	85	57	+28	34
8	Sants	30	14	4	12	60	54	+6	32
9	Europa	30	13	4	13	62	54	+8	30
10	Manacor	30	11	3	16	50	72	−22	25
11	Mahón	30	10	4	16	53	86	−33	24
12	Martinenc	30	7	9	14	35	50	−15	23
13	Binéfar	30	8	6	16	47	78	−31	22
14	Mataró	30	7	7	16	54	76	−22	21
15	Tàrrega	30	9	3	18	48	86	−38	21
16	Igualada	30	4	4	22	33	97	−64	12

=== Group IV ===
Pos	Team	Pld	W	D	L	GF	GA	GD	Pts
1	Cacereño	30	19	7	4	74	31	+43	45
2	Iliturgi	30	19	3	8	76	41	+35	41
3	Manchego	30	16	6	8	60	34	+26	38
4	Emeritense	30	15	5	10	70	44	+26	35
5	Calvo Sotelo	30	15	5	10	60	42	+18	35
6	Tomelloso	30	12	10	8	63	45	+18	34
7	Badajoz	30	15	3	12	61	50	+11	33
8	Valdepeñas	30	13	6	11	50	48	+2	32
9	Rayo Vallecano	30	13	5	12	52	46	+6	31
10	Toledo	30	14	1	15	77	76	+1	29
11	Cuatro Caminos	30	11	6	13	45	56	−11	28
12	Guadalajara	30	12	3	15	64	87	−23	27
13	Miguel de Prado	30	10	2	18	50	77	−27	22
14	San Lorenzo	30	7	4	19	57	96	−39	18
15	Gimnástica Segoviana	30	8	2	20	48	81	−33	16 (Note: 2 points deducted from Gimnástica Segoviana following their non-appearance at CP Cacereño who were awarded the win.)
16	Real Ávila	30	6	2	22	33	86	−53	14

=== Group V ===
Pos	Team	Pld	W	D	L	GF	GA	GD	Pts
1	Orihuela	28	16	5	7	66	51	+15	37
2	Villena	28	15	3	10	63	54	+9	33
3	Atlético de Zaragoza	28	13	6	9	62	55	+7	32
4	Novelda	28	13	5	10	73	56	+17	31
5	Catarroja	28	12	6	10	50	53	−3	30
6	Castellón	28	13	3	12	52	38	+14	29
7	Imperial	28	12	5	11	69	65	+4	29
8	Hellín	28	12	4	12	69	51	+18	28
9	Calatayud	28	12	4	12	59	64	−5	28
10	Soriano	28	12	3	13	78	67	+11	27
11	San Javier	28	12	2	14	57	52	+5	26
12	Conquense	28	11	4	13	48	63	−15	26
13	Elche	28	11	2	15	47	67	−20	24
14	Aspense	28	10	4	14	48	70	−22	24
15	Naval	28	6	4	18	39	74	−35	16
16	Hernán Cortés (Note: Team withdrawn from the competition)	0	0	0	0	0	0	0	0

=== Group VI ===
Pos	Team	Pld	W	D	L	GF	GA	GD	Pts
1	Real Jaén	26	17	3	6	84	40	+44	37
2	Almería	26	16	3	7	70	37	+33	35
3	Real Betis	26	14	4	8	63	47	+16	32
4	Cádiz	26	15	1	10	66	39	+27	31
5	Ceuta	26	15	1	10	59	44	+15	31
6	Recreativo de Huelva	26	13	5	8	54	45	+9	31
7	España de Tánger	26	13	4	9	56	44	+12	30
8	Algeciras	26	12	2	12	47	48	−1	26
9	San Fernando	26	11	3	12	55	51	+4	24 (Note: 1 point deducted for playing an ineligible player in a 1-1 draw at Español de Tetuán who were awarded the win.)
10	Xerez	26	8	7	11	52	71	−19	23
11	Recreativo de Granada	26	8	4	14	36	54	−18	20
12	Español de Tetuán	26	6	4	16	41	71	−30	16
13	Utrera	26	5	6	15	30	62	−32	16
14	Atlético Malagueño	26	4	3	19	24	84	−60	11
15	Maghreb-el-Aksa (Note: Team withdrawn from the competition)	0	0	0	0	0	0	0	0
16	Larache	0	0	0	0	0	0	0	0

== Promotion playoff ==
=== Group I ===
Pos	Team	Pld	W	D	L	GF	GA	GD	Pts
1	Atlético de Zamora	8	5	0	3	16	17	−1	10
2	Lucense	8	3	2	3	8	9	−1	8
3	Getxo	8	4	0	4	15	11	+4	8
4	Badalona	8	3	2	3	15	12	+3	8
5	Girona	8	2	2	4	7	12	−5	6

=== Group II ===
Pos	Team	Pld	W	D	L	GF	GA	GD	Pts
1	Alicante	8	4	2	2	20	11	+9	10
2	Recreativo de Huelva	8	4	1	3	19	12	+7	9
3	Cartagena	8	4	0	4	17	19	−2	8
4	Castellón	8	3	1	4	14	18	−4	7
5	Tomelloso	8	2	2	4	11	21	−10	6

== Season records ==
- Most wins: 21, España Industrial.
- Most draws: 10, Tomelloso.
- Most losses: 22, Polvorín, Igualada and Real Ávila.
- Most goals for: 90, Escoriaza.
- Most goals against: 104, Polvorín.
- Most points: 46, España Industrial.
- Fewest wins: 4, Polvorín, Igualada and Atlético Malagueño.
- Fewest draws: 1, 5 teams.
- Fewest losses: 4, Cacereño.
- Fewest goals for: 24, Atlético Malagueño.
- Fewest goals against: 24, Real Avilés.
- Fewest points: 11, Atlético Malagueño.
