= 1956–57 Tercera División =

Tercera División
- Season: 1956–57

The 1956–57 Tercera División season was the 21st since its establishment.

== League table ==
=== Group 1 ===
| Pos | Team | Pld | W | D | L | GF | GA | GD | Pts | Qualification or relegation |
|---|---|---|---|---|---|---|---|---|---|---|
| 1 | Orense | 34 | 22 | 7 | 5 | 92 | 35 | +57 | 51 | Promotion play-offs (champions) |
| 2 | Turista | 34 | 22 | 5 | 7 | 98 | 38 | +60 | 49 | Promotion/relegation play-offs |
| 3 | Lugo | 34 | 19 | 7 | 8 | 65 | 39 | +26 | 45 | |
| 4 | Arosa | 34 | 20 | 2 | 12 | 53 | 45 | +8 | 42 | |
| 5 | Lemos | 34 | 17 | 5 | 12 | 67 | 41 | +26 | 39 | |
| 6 | Arsenal Ferrol | 34 | 16 | 7 | 11 | 58 | 45 | +13 | 39 | |
| 7 | Juvenil | 34 | 16 | 6 | 12 | 62 | 43 | +19 | 38 | |
| 8 | Fabril | 34 | 15 | 6 | 13 | 47 | 51 | −4 | 36 | |
| 9 | Flavia | 34 | 15 | 4 | 15 | 53 | 77 | −24 | 34 | |
| 10 | Gran Peña | 34 | 13 | 7 | 14 | 57 | 50 | +7 | 33 | |
| 11 | Santiago | 34 | 13 | 6 | 15 | 74 | 55 | +19 | 32 | |
| 12 | Zeltia | 34 | 13 | 4 | 17 | 55 | 81 | −26 | 30 | |
| 13 | Puenteareas | 34 | 13 | 4 | 17 | 57 | 64 | −7 | 30 | |
| 14 | Órdenes | 34 | 12 | 4 | 18 | 46 | 81 | −35 | 28 | |
| 15 | Pontevedra | 34 | 12 | 4 | 18 | 51 | 61 | −10 | 28 | Relegation to Regional |
| 16 | Brigantium | 34 | 10 | 5 | 19 | 53 | 72 | −19 | 23 | Relegation to Regional |
| 17 | Marín | 34 | 10 | 2 | 22 | 38 | 80 | −42 | 22 | Relegation to Regional |
| 18 | Ribadeo | 34 | 4 | 3 | 27 | 30 | 98 | −68 | 11 | Relegation to Regional |

=== Group 2 ===
| Pos | Team | Pld | W | D | L | GF | GA | GD | Pts | Qualification or relegation |
|---|---|---|---|---|---|---|---|---|---|---|
| 1 | Entrego | 28 | 18 | 8 | 2 | 85 | 37 | +48 | 44 | Promotion on play-offs (champions) |
| 2 | Langreano | 28 | 15 | 9 | 4 | 71 | 35 | +36 | 39 | Promotion/relegation play-offs |
| 3 | Titánico | 28 | 14 | 5 | 9 | 69 | 57 | +12 | 33 | |
| 4 | Turón | 28 | 11 | 4 | 13 | 52 | 62 | −10 | 26 | |
| 5 | Condal | 28 | 10 | 4 | 14 | 59 | 85 | −26 | 24 | |
| 6 | Juvencia | 28 | 9 | 6 | 13 | 51 | 60 | −9 | 24 | |
| 7 | Marino de Luanco | 28 | 6 | 10 | 12 | 42 | 57 | −15 | 22 | |
| 8 | Calzada | 28 | 3 | 6 | 19 | 38 | 74 | −36 | 12 | |

=== Group 3 ===
| Pos | Team | Pld | W | D | L | GF | GA | GD | Pts | Qualification or relegation |
|---|---|---|---|---|---|---|---|---|---|---|
| 1 | Basconia | 30 | 17 | 7 | 6 | 68 | 34 | +34 | 41 | Promotion play-offs (champions) |
| 2 | Gimnástica Torrelavega | 30 | 16 | 5 | 9 | 47 | 36 | +11 | 37 | Promotion/relegation play-offs |
| 3 | Villosa | 30 | 15 | 5 | 10 | 47 | 35 | +12 | 35 | |
| 4 | Arenas | 30 | 15 | 5 | 10 | 34 | 29 | +5 | 35 | |
| 5 | Deusto | 30 | 14 | 6 | 10 | 64 | 47 | +17 | 34 | |
| 6 | Durango | 30 | 13 | 4 | 13 | 48 | 44 | +4 | 30 | |
| 7 | Getxo | 30 | 12 | 6 | 12 | 38 | 34 | +4 | 30 | |
| 8 | Balmaseda | 27 | 13 | 0 | 14 | 39 | 43 | −4 | 26 | |
| 9 | Rayo Cantabria | 30 | 13 | 2 | 15 | 52 | 61 | −9 | 28 | |
| 10 | Begoña | 30 | 11 | 6 | 13 | 33l | 37 | — | 28 | |
| 11 | Portugalete | 30 | 10 | 7 | 13 | 41 | 55 | −14 | 27 | |
| 12 | Padura | 30 | 10 | 6 | 14 | 38 | 44 | −6 | 26 | |
| 13 | Erandio | 30 | 11 | 4 | 15 | 37 | 38 | −1 | 26 | |
| 14 | Bermeo | 30 | 10 | 6 | 14 | 0 | 52 | −52 | 26 | Qualified to relegation play-offs |
| 15 | Laredo | 34 | 12 | 4 | 18 | 51 | 61 | −10 | 28 | Relegation to Regional |
| 16 | Santoña | 34 | 10 | 5 | 19 | 53 | 0 | +53 | 25 | Relegation to Regional |

Updated to match(es) played on unknown. Source: Futbolme

=== Group 4 ===
| Pos | Team | Pld | W | D | L | GF | GA | GD | Pts | Qualification or relegation |
|---|---|---|---|---|---|---|---|---|---|---|
| 1 | Elgóibar | 34 | 20 | 6 | 8 | 86 | 44 | +42 | 46 | Promotion play-offs (champions) |
| 2 | Askoyen | 34 | 19 | 6 | 9 | 70 | 46 | +24 | 44 | Promotion/relegation play-offs |
| 3 | Villafranca | 34 | 19 | 5 | 10 | 69 | 51 | +18 | 43 | |
| 4 | Tudelano | 34 | 18 | 6 | 10 | 66 | 53 | +13 | 42 | |
| 5 | Touring | 34 | 19 | 3 | 12 | 77 | 49 | +28 | 41 | |
| 6 | Calahorra | 34 | 18 | 4 | 12 | 76 | 59 | +17 | 40 | |
| 7 | Beasain | 34 | 16 | 5 | 13 | 74 | 64 | +10 | 37 | |
| 8 | Hernani | 34 | 13 | 8 | 13 | 51 | 51 | 0 | 34 | |
| 9 | Anaitasuna | 34 | 14 | 6 | 14 | 64 | 63 | +1 | 34 | |
| 10 | Iruña | 34 | 14 | 6 | 14 | 58 | 60 | −2 | 34 | |
| 11 | Vitoria | 34 | 14 | 5 | 15 | 66 | 59 | +7 | 33 | |
| 12 | Real Unión | 34 | 11 | 10 | 13 | 58 | 59 | −1 | 32 | |
| 13 | Mirandés | 34 | 13 | 5 | 16 | 53 | 63 | −10 | 31 | |
| 14 | Oberena | 34 | 12 | 6 | 16 | 60 | 60 | 0 | 30 | |
| 15 | Mondragón | 34 | 13 | 3 | 18 | 57 | 61 | −4 | 29 | Qualified to relegation play-offs |
| 16 | Peña Sport | 34 | 8 | 9 | 17 | 45 | 84 | −39 | 25 | Relegation to Regional |
| 17 | Castejón | 34 | 5 | 10 | 19 | 43 | 87 | −44 | 20 | Relegation to Regional |
| 18 | Alesves | 34 | 6 | 5 | 23 | 36 | 96 | −60 | 17 | Relegation to Regional |

Updated to match(es) played on unknown. Source:

== Promotion play-off ==
Source:
