= 1967–68 UE Lleida season =

UE Lleida
1967–68 season
- Chairman: (Spain) José Jové
- Manager: (Spain) Quique Martín (to December) (Spain) Manolo Bademunt (caretaker) (Spain) Miguel Murueta (from December)
- Segunda División: 12th (relegated)
- Copa del Generalísimo: First Round
- Top goalscorer: League: Antonio Bautista (8); All: Antonio Bautista; José Fuentes (8)
Home colours

The 1967–68 season was the 29th season in UE Lleida's existence, and their 2nd year in Segunda División after 1966 promotion.

== Squad ==
	Player	Pos	Lge Apps	Lge Gls	Cup Apps	Cup Gls	Tot Apps	Tot Gls	Date signed	Previous club
Goalkeepers
(Spain)	Francisco Crespillo	GK	19 (1)	-	2	-	21 (1)	-	1967	Triana
(Spain)	Carlos Patiño	GK	11	-	1	-	12	-	1963	Plus Ultra
Defenders
(Spain)	Manuel Buján	DF	23	-	3	-	26	-	1967	Sabadell
(Spain)	Vicente Pascual	DF	21	-	1	-	22	-	1967	Nàstic Tarragona
(Spain)	Rodrigo Durán Rori	DF	19	-	2	-	21	-	1966	Celta
(Spain)	Enrique Roselló	DF	11	-	3	-	14	-	1967	Nàstic Tarragona
(Paraguay)	Evaristo Bernal	DF	10	-	2	-	12	-	1967	Málaga
(Spain)	Juan Ramón Farrás	DF	8	-	-	-	8	-	1968	Academy
(Spain)	Francisco Belenguer	DF	7	1	1	-	8	1	1967	Sabadell
(Spain)	Antonio Moya	DF	2	-	-	-	2	-	1968	Espanyol
Midfielders
(Spain)	Antonio Bautista	MF	28	8	3	-	31	8	1967	Sabadell
(Spain)	Francisco Guzmán	MF	16	1	1	-	17	1	1966	Menorca
(Spain)	Juan Forteza	MF	15	-	2	-	17	-	1966	Mallorca
(Spain)	Pablo Alsina	MF	9	-	-	-	9	-	1967	Constància
(Spain)	Rabasa	MF	9	1	-	-	9	1	1968	Academy
(Spain)	Federico Torrentí	MF	3	-	-	-	3	-	1967	Mallorca
(Spain)	José María García Montaner	MF	1	-	-	-	1	-	1967	Betis
Forwards
(Spain)	José Fuentes	CF	29	7	3	1	32	8	1967	Mestalla
(Spain)	José Sánchez Pepín	CF	29	1	3	1	32	2	1967	Mallorca
(Spain)	Salvador Martí	CF	24	-	2	1	26	1	1967	Sabadell
(Spain)	Antonio Vallejo	CF	14	2	2	-	16	2	1964	Castellón
(Spain)	Francisco Portalés	CF	11	2	1	-	12	2	1967	Sabadell
(Spain)	Modesto Martínez	CF	6	1	-	-	6	1	1968	Academy
(Spain)	Masip	CF	3	-	-	-	3	-	1968	Academy
(Spain)	José Ramón Rivas Jaussi	CF	2	-	1	1	3	1	1967	Xerez

== Competitions ==
=== Pre-season ===
12 August 1967	Lleida	1 – 1	Levante	Lleida
	Jaussi 65'		Núñez 50'	Stadium: Camp d'Esports; Referee: Torrent

17 August 1967	Lleida	2 – 2	Sabadell	Lleida
	Jaussi 35'; Vallejo 88' (pen.)		Montesinos 15'; Seminario 70' (pen.)	Stadium: Camp d'Esports; Referee: Sierra

20 August 1967	Lleida	0 – 2	Zaragoza	Lleida
			Santos 1' (pen.), 58'	Stadium: Camp d'Esports; Referee: Mòdol

24 August 1967	Igualada	2 – 2	Lleida	Igualada
	Andreu 4'; Sevilla 33'		Vallejo 3'; Fuentes 51'	Referee: Marià

29 August 1967	Lleida	1 – 2	Badalona	El Poal
	? ?'		Juan Luis ?'; Franch ?'	Referee: Sierra

5 September 1967	Borges	1 – 1	Lleida	Les Borges Blanques
	Bermejo 43'		Castellví 82'	Referee: Ballester

7 September 1967	Barbastro	1 – 1	Lleida	Barbastro
	? ?'		Montaner ?'

=== League ===
10 September 1967 Round 1	Lleida	1 – 1	Rayo Vallecano	Lleida
	Portalés 40'		Grande 83'	Stadium: Camp d'Esports; Referee: Canera Coscolín

17 September 1967 Round 2	Oviedo	2 – 0	Lleida	Oviedo
	Achuri 52'; Icazuriaga 62'			Stadium: Carlos Tartiere; Referee: Moreda Fernández

24 September 1967 Round 3	Lleida	0 – 2	Deportivo	Lleida
			Beci 8', 75'	Stadium: Camp d'Esports; Referee: Canera Coscolín

8 October 1967 Round 4	Gimnástica	2 – 1	Lleida	Torrelavega
	Arce 35'; Benítez 53'		Fuentes 79'	Stadium: El Malecón; Referee: Canera Coscolín

15 October 1967 Round 5	Lleida	3 – 1	Valladolid	Lleida
	Fuentes 10'; Bautista 17'; Pepín 24'		Docal 4'	Stadium: Camp d'Esports; Referee: Galende Valladolid

29 October 1967 Round 6	Badajoz	0 – 2	Lleida	Badajoz
			Vallejo 64'; Bautista 89'	Stadium: El Vivero; Referee: Pascual Tejerina

5 November 1967 Round 7	Burgos	3 – 1	Lleida	Burgos
	Olalde 33'; Amavisca 78'; Goyarán 83'		Vallejo 44'	Stadium: El Plantío; Referee: Peiró Apastegui

12 November 1967 Round 8	Lleida	2 – 1	Langreo	Lleida
	Portalés 30'; Belenguer 73'		Secades 72'	Stadium: Camp d'Esports; Referee: Orrantia Capelastegui

19 November 1967 Round 9	Celta	6 – 0	Lleida	Vigo
	Novoa 6'; Belenguer 7' (o.g.); Rivera 14', 19'; Lezcano 16'; Abel 44'			Stadium: Balaídos; Referee: Maza Rodríguez

26 November 1967 Round 10	Lleida	0 – 0	Sporting	Lleida
				Stadium: Camp d'Esports; Referee: Orrantia Capelastegui

3 December 1967 Round 11	Racing Ferrol	1 – 0	Lleida	Ferrol
	Castro 53'			Stadium: Manuel Rivera; Referee: García Ibáñez

10 December 1967 Round 12	Lleida	0 – 1	Racing Santander	Lleida
			Gento 60'	Stadium: Camp d'Esports; Referee: Peiró Apastegui

17 December 1967 Round 13	Osasuna	5 – 0	Lleida	Pamplona
	Jiménez 8'; Fanjul 22', 52', 74'; García Castany 28'			Stadium: El Sadar; Referee: Peiró Apastegui

31 December 1967 Round 14	Lleida	2 – 0	Europa	Lleida
	Fuentes 4', 56' (pen.)			Stadium: Camp d'Esports; Referee: Moya Aparici

7 January 1968 Round 15	Badalona	3 – 0	Lleida	Badalona
	Gasull 5'; Castaño 79', 89'			Stadium: Camp del Centenari; Referee: Peiró Apastegui

14 January 1968 Round 16	Rayo Vallecano	2 – 0	Lleida	Madrid
	Bordons 13', 84'			Stadium: Vallecas; Referee: Nieto García

21 January 1968 Round 17	Lleida	1 – 1	Oviedo	Lleida
	Bautista 53'		Quirós 44'	Stadium: Camp d'Esports; Referee: Segrelles del Pilar

28 January 1968 Round 18	Deportivo	3 – 1	Lleida	A Coruña
	Sertucha 18'; José Luis 73'; Beci 81'		Bautista 43'	Stadium: Riazor; Referee: Ortiz Salgado

4 February 1968 Round 19	Lleida	0 – 0	Gimnástica	Lleida
				Stadium: Camp d'Esports; Referee: Cañete Laguna

11 February 1968 Round 20	Valladolid	4 – 0	Lleida	Valladolid
	Melo 6'; Docal 75', 76'; García Sáiz 90'			Stadium: José Zorrilla; Referee: Altuna Cenoz

18 February 1968 Round 21	Lleida	2 – 2	Badajoz	Lleida
	Modesto 49'; Suárez 77' (o.g.)		Suárez 2', 51'	Stadium: Camp d'Esports; Referee: Peiró Apastegui

25 February 1968 Round 22	Lleida	1 – 1	Burgos	Lleida
	Fuentes 20'		Aramburu 53'	Stadium: Camp d'Esports; Referee: Carreño Arquimbau

3 March 1968 Round 23	Langreo	1 – 0	Lleida	Langreo
	Alonso 17'			Stadium: Ganzábal; Referee: Nieto García

10 March 1968 Round 24	Lleida	1 – 1	Celta	Lleida
	Bautista 89'		Villar 30'	Stadium: Camp d'Esports; Referee: Canera Coscolín

17 March 1968 Round 25	Sporting	6 – 0	Lleida	Gijón
	Puente 12'; Pocholo 32', 76'; Solabarrieta 48', 69'; Iglesias 63'			Stadium: El Molinón; Referee: Nieto García

24 March 1968 Round 26	Lleida	2 – 0	Racing Ferrol	Lleida
	Rabasa 28'; Bautista 83'			Stadium: Camp d'Esports; Referee: Moya Aparici

7 April 1968 Round 27	Racing Santander	0 – 1	Lleida	Santander
	Guzmán 9'			Stadium: El Sardinero; Referee: García Jaime

14 April 1968 Round 28	Lleida	2 – 1	Osasuna	Lleida
	Fuentes 42'; Bautista 44'		Pita 10'	Stadium: Camp d'Esports; Referee: Balaguer García

21 April 1968 Round 29	Europa	0 – 1	Lleida	Barcelona
	Fuentes 26'			Stadium: Sardenya; Referee: Segrelles del Pilar

28 April 1968 Round 30	Lleida	1 – 1	Badalona	Lleida
	Bautista 40'		Castaño 48'	Stadium: Camp d'Esports; Referee: Cañete Laguna

==== Results by round ====
Round	1	2	3	4	5	6	7	8	9	10	11	12	13	14	15	16	17	18	19	20	21	22	23	24	25	26	27	28	29	30
Ground	H	A	H	A	H	A	A	H	A	H	A	H	A	H	A	A	H	A	H	A	H	H	A	H	A	H	A	H	A	H
Result	D	L	L	L	W	W	L	W	L	D	L	L	L	W	L	L	D	L	D	L	D	D	L	D	L	W	W	W	W	D
Position	11	13	15	16	13	12	13	12	13	12	13	14	15	14	15	15	15	16	16	16	16	16	16	16	16	16	16	13	12	12

Updated to match(es) played on 19 May. Source:
A = Away; H = Home; W = Win; D = Draw; L = Loss

=== Copa del Generalísimo ===
1 October 1967 First 1st Leg	Xerez	3 – 0	Lleida	Jerez de la Frontera
	Beato 53'; Canario 70'; Alias 77'			Stadium: Domecq; Referee: Carreño

22 October 1967 First 2nd Leg	Lleida	3 – 0	Xerez	Lleida
	Fuentes 11'; Pepín 31'; Martí 83'			Stadium: Camp d'Esports; Referee: Balaguer

12 December 1967 First Replay	Xerez	2 – 1 (a.e.t.)	Lleida	Valencia
	Beato 65'; Aramendi 107' (pen.)		Jaussi 5'	Stadium: Vallejo; Referee: Carreño

=== Friendly ===
1 May 1968	Lleida	2 – 1	Aragón	Lleida
	Sánchez 42', 60'		Hernández ?'	Stadium: Camp d'Esports; Referee: Sierra

4 May 1968	Balaguer	0 – 3	Lleida	Balaguer
			Sánchez 20'; Vidal 32'; Guzmán 70' (pen.)	Referee: Lorente

9 May 1968	Lleida	1 – 1	FC Barcelona	Lleida
	Pepín 73'		Vidal 25'	Stadium: Camp d'Esports; Referee: Torrent

=== Copa Presidente 1968 ===
21 May 1968	Espanyol	2 – 0	Lleida	Barcelona
	Legui 17', 82'			Stadium: Sarrià; Referee: Pintado

25 May 1968	Terrassa	1 – 2	Lleida	Terrassa
	Casorrán ?'		Modesto 1'; Guzmán 87'	Referee: Ortega

28 May 1968	Lleida	1 – 1	Sabadell	Lleida
	Pini 3' (o.g.)		Isidro 55'	Stadium: Camp d'Esports; Referee: Ortiga

1 June 1968	Lleida	0 – 2	Espanyol	Lleida
			Bergara 57' (pen.); Carbonell 85'	Stadium: Camp d'Esports; Referee: Mòdol

5 June 1968	Lleida	2 – 0	Terrassa	Lleida
	Tito 27'; Aceves 44'			Stadium: Camp d'Esports; Referee: Tomeu

9 June 1968	Sabadell	3 – 0	Lleida	Sabadell
	Isidro ?'; Valerio 55'; Palau 83'			Referee: Vilanova
