= 1956–57 Segunda División =

26th season of the second-tier football league in Spain

Segunda División
- Season: 1956–57
- Champions: Real Gijón; Granada
- Promoted: Real Gijón; Granada
- Relegated: Logroñés; Mestalla; Baracaldo; Algeciras; Burgos; Puente Genil; Lérida; Castellón
- Matches: 760
- Goals: 2,521 (3.32 per match)
- Top goalscorer: Ricardo Alós (45 goals)
- Best goalkeeper: Manuel Sión (0.64 goals/match)
- Biggest home win: Real Gijón 11–0 Lérida (13 January 1957)
- Biggest away win: Lérida 0–5 Sabadell (11 November 1956)
- Highest scoring: Alavés 10–1 Logroñés (28 October 1956); Cádiz 7–4 Eldense (4 November 1956); Real Gijón 11–0 Lérida (13 January 1957); Córdoba 7–4 Tenerife (30 May 1957)

The 1956–57 Segunda División season was the 26th since its establishment and was played between 8 September 1956 and 16 June 1957.

== Overview before the season ==
40 teams joined the league, including 4 relegated from the 1955–56 La Liga and 11 promoted from the 1955–56 Tercera División.

Relegated from La Liga

- Murcia
- Alavés
- Cultural Leonesa
- Hércules

Promoted from Tercera División

- Burgos
- Gerona
- Levante
- Córdoba
- Avilés
- Rayo Vallecano
- Alicante
- Puente Genil
- Eldense
- Algeciras (Note: After a merge with España Tánger)
- Atlético Ceuta (Note: After a merge between Ceuta and Atlético Tetuán)

== Group North ==
=== Teams ===
Location of teams in Segunda División 1956-57 Group North

Club	City	Stadium
Deportivo Alavés	Vitoria	Mendizorroza
Real Avilés CF	Avilés	La Exposición
Club Baracaldo	Baracaldo	Lasesarre
Burgos CF	Burgos	Zatorre
Caudal Deportivo	Mieres	El Batán
Cultural Leonesa	León	La Puentecilla
SD Eibar	Eibar	Ipurúa
Club Ferrol	Ferrol	Manuel Rivera
Gerona CF	Gerona	Vista Alegre
Real Gijón	Gijón	El Molinón
SD Indauchu	Bilbao	Garellano
CP La Felguera	La Felguera, Langreo	La Barraca
UD Lérida	Lérida	Campo de Deportes
CD Logroñés	Logroño	Las Gaunas
Real Oviedo CF	Oviedo	Buenavista
AD Rayo Vallecano	Madrid	Vallecas
CD Sabadell FC	Sabadell	Cruz Alta
Real Santander SD	Santander	El Sardinero
Club Sestao	Sestao	Las Llanas
CD Tarrasa	Tarrasa	Obispo Irurita

=== League table ===
Pos	Team	Pld	W	D	L	GF	GA	GD	Pts	Promotion, qualification or relegation
1	Real Gijón (P)	38	28	6	4	107	26	+81	62	Promotion to La Liga
2	Sabadell	38	24	6	8	92	39	+53	54	
3	Indauchu	38	21	6	11	72	45	+27	48	
4	Oviedo	38	20	6	12	77	60	+17	46	
5	Alavés	38	17	9	12	61	52	+9	43	
6	Cultural Leonesa	38	18	5	15	63	61	+2	41	
7	Avilés	38	17	5	16	75	60	+15	39	
8	Real Santander	38	15	7	16	60	62	−2	37 (Note: Real Santander finished ahead of Gerona on head-to-head points: Real Santander–Gerona 1–1, Gerona–Real Santander 0–2)	
9	Gerona	38	15	7	16	54	53	+1	37	
10	Eibar	38	14	8	16	63	79	−16	36	
11	Caudal	38	16	3	19	66	72	−6	35 (Note: Caudal finished ahead of Rayo Vallecano on head-to-head points: Caudal–Rayo Vallecano 3–0, Rayo Vallecano–Caudal 1–2)	
12	Rayo Vallecano	38	15	5	18	45	45	0	35	
13	Tarrasa	38	13	8	17	57	60	−3	34 (Note: Tarrasa finished ahead of Sestao and La Felguera on head-to-head goal difference)	
14	Sestao	38	13	8	17	60	67	−7	34	
15	La Felguera (O)	38	15	4	19	46	62	−16	34	Qualification for the relegation playoffs
16	Ferrol (O)	38	14	5	19	51	72	−21	33	Qualification for the relegation playoffs
17	Logroñés (R)	38	12	8	18	44	70	−26	32	Relegation to Tercera División
18	Baracaldo (R)	38	12	7	19	50	83	−33	31	Relegation to Tercera División
19	Burgos (R)	38	11	8	19	46	65	−19	30	Relegation to Tercera División
20	Lérida (R)	38	8	3	27	37	93	−56	19	Relegation to Tercera División

Source: BDFútbol
Rules for classification: 1) points; 2) head-to-head points; 3) head-to-head goal difference; 4) goal difference; 5) number of goals scored
(O) Play-off winners; (P) Promoted; (R) Relegated

=== Results ===
Home \ Away	ALA	AVI	BAR	BUR	CAU	LEO	EIB	IND	FEL	GIR	LLE	LOG	OVI	RFE	RAC	RAY	SPO	SAB	SES	TRR
Alavés	—	2–0	1–0	1–0	3–1	0–0	1–1	3–0	3–2	2–1	3–1	10–1	1–2	2–1	2–1	1–0	3–3	1–1	1–0	3–2
Avilés	3–0	—	6–1	1–1	4–0	3–0	4–1	0–1	8–1	1–0	3–0	3–1	2–3	3–1	7–1	1–0	2–2	0–0	3–1	3–2
Baracaldo	2–2	1–1	—	1–2	5–1	3–0	2–2	2–1	0–2	1–1	4–1	2–0	2–0	1–0	1–3	2–0	0–1	2–1	2–3	2–1
Burgos	1–1	2–0	3–2	—	1–5	4–0	3–0	0–0	2–3	3–1	6–0	3–1	0–0	3–0	0–1	1–2	0–0	3–1	1–3	0–1
Caudal	3–0	7–1	0–1	4–1	—	2–1	4–1	2–4	0–3	2–0	4–0	1–2	0–2	2–1	4–3	3–0	0–1	1–0	1–1	2–1
Cultural Leonesa	2–2	1–0	6–1	1–0	4–3	—	2–0	2–0	1–0	6–0	2–0	3–0	1–0	6–2	1–0	2–3	1–3	1–3	2–1	2–0
Eibar	0–2	1–1	3–1	4–0	3–2	1–1	—	3–2	3–1	2–4	3–1	3–0	2–3	5–1	4–3	1–0	2–1	2–2	3–2	2–0
Indauchu	1–0	2–0	2–2	2–0	6–0	1–1	4–0	—	3–2	2–2	1–0	6–1	4–2	1–0	3–1	0–1	0–1	4–1	0–1	5–1
La Felguera	1–3	1–0	2–0	2–0	1–0	2–0	1–1	1–0	—	0–2	4–1	0–0	1–3	5–1	1–3	2–0	0–0	1–0	1–0	3–0
Gerona	3–0	2–0	4–0	2–1	2–1	3–1	3–1	0–1	4–0	—	5–1	0–0	0–0	1–1	0–2	1–0	0–1	0–1	2–0	1–0
Lérida	1–3	3–1	5–1	4–2	1–1	0–1	0–1	0–1	1–0	2–0	—	5–0	0–2	3–2	0–0	1–1	1–4	0–5	1–2	0–1
Logroñés	1–0	2–1	1–1	0–0	1–2	2–1	4–0	2–3	0–0	1–0	3–0	—	2–1	1–0	1–2	1–2	0–0	0–0	2–2	4–1
Oviedo	1–0	3–4	5–1	5–0	3–1	1–0	4–2	2–3	4–1	4–2	2–1	3–1	—	5–1	3–0	2–1	1–2	1–1	4–2	1–1
Ferrol	1–0	2–1	4–0	2–0	0–0	2–1	1–0	2–3	3–0	2–2	2–0	2–1	3–2	—	2–2	3–1	1–3	1–0	2–1	3–0
Real Santander	4–1	5–3	1–2	2–0	2–1	1–2	2–2	3–2	2–0	1–1	3–0	0–2	1–1	1–1	—	4–0	0–2	1–2	1–0	0–0
Rayo Vallecano	3–1	3–1	3–1	0–1	1–2	5–0	1–0	0–0	3–0	1–2	1–2	0–1	1–0	4–0	0–1	—	1–0	2–0	0–0	2–2
Real Gijón	4–0	5–1	4–0	4–0	6–1	4–2	7–1	0–1	1–0	3–0	11–0	4–0	5–1	4–0	4–0	2–0	—	5–0	1–1	2–1
Sabadell	1–0	2–1	6–0	7–0	3–0	6–1	5–1	3–0	4–1	3–1	2–0	3–2	6–0	1–0	1–1	2–0	3–0	—	7–1	3–0
Sestao	2–2	0–1	1–1	1–1	2–3	1–3	3–1	2–1	2–0	3–1	4–1	4–2	1–1	3–0	3–1	0–1	1–4	2–3	—	3–2
Tarrasa	1–1	0–1	4–0	1–1	1–0	2–2	1–1	2–2	4–1	3–1	2–0	2–1	4–0	4–1	1–0	3–1	1–3	1–2	4–1	—

Source: BDFútbol
Legend: Blue = home team win; Yellow = draw; Red = away team win.

=== Top goalscorers ===
Goalscorers	Goals	Team
(Spain) Ricardo Alós	45	Real Gijón
(Spain) Francisco Doval	27	Avilés
(Spain) Manuel Lara	22	Sabadell
(Spain) José Luis Piquín	18	Sabadell
(Spain) Lolo Gómez	18	Real Santander

=== Top goalkeepers ===
Goalkeeper	Goals	Matches	Average	Team
(Spain) Manuel Sión	23	36	0.64	Real Gijón
(Spain) Juan Parcet	20	23	0.87	Sabadell
(Spain) Pita	26	26	1	Rayo Vallecano
(Spain) José María Cobo	36	32	1.13	Indauchu
(Spain) Isidro Acosta	30	24	1.25	Girona

== Group South ==
=== Teams ===
Location of teams in Segunda División 1956-57 Group South
Canary Islands

Club	City	Stadium
España de Algeciras CF	Algeciras	El Mirador
Alicante CF	Alicante	Bardín
Atlético Ceuta	Ceuta	Alfonso Murube
CD Badajoz	Badajoz	El Vivero
Real Betis Balompié	Seville	Heliópolis
Cádiz CF	Cádiz	Ramón de Carranza
CD Castellón	Castellón de la Plana	Castalia
Córdoba CF	Córdoba	El Arcángel
CD Eldense	Elda	El Parque
CF Extremadura	Almendralejo	Francisco de la Hera
Granada CF	Granada	Los Cármenes
Hércules CF	Alicante	La Viña
Jerez CD	Jerez de la Frontera	Domecq
Levante UD	Valencia	Vallejo
CD Málaga	Málaga	La Rosaleda Stadium
CD Mestalla	Valencia	Mestalla
Real Murcia	Murcia	La Condomina
Puente Genil CF	Puente Genil	Jesús Nazareno
CD San Fernando	San Fernando	Marqués de Varela
CD Tenerife	Santa Cruz de Tenerife	Heliodoro Rodríguez López

=== League table ===
Pos	Team	Pld	W	D	L	GF	GA	GD	Pts	Promotion, qualification or relegation
1	Granada (P)	38	22	3	13	79	45	+34	47	Promotion to La Liga
2	Hércules	38	19	7	12	66	52	+14	45	
3	Murcia	38	19	5	14	68	50	+18	43 (Note: Murcia finished ahead of Córdoba on head-to-head goal difference: Murcia–Córdoba 3–0, Córdoba–Murcia 3–1)	
4	Córdoba	38	19	5	14	96	66	+30	43	
5	Málaga	38	16	10	12	67	45	+22	42	
6	Real Betis	38	17	7	14	80	51	+29	41 (Note: Real Betis finished ahead of Badajoz on head-to-head points: Real Betis–Badajoz 2–2, Badajoz–Real Betis 0–3)	
7	Badajoz	38	18	5	15	67	64	+3	41	
8	Atlético Ceuta	38	17	5	16	53	58	−5	39 (Note: Atlético Ceuta finished ahead of Extremadura and Xerez on head-to-head goal difference)	
9	Extremadura	38	18	3	17	61	71	−10	39	
10	Xerez	38	15	9	14	64	56	+8	39	
11	Levante	38	14	10	14	65	68	−3	38 (Note: Levante finished ahead of Cádiz on head-to-head points: Levante–Cádiz 6–0, Cádiz–Levante 3–3)	
12	Cádiz	38	16	6	16	58	72	−14	38	
13	Tenerife	38	16	5	17	71	60	+11	37 (Note: Tenerife finished ahead of San Fernando and Alicante on head-to-head goal difference)	
14	San Fernando	38	17	3	18	63	79	−16	37	
15	Alicante (O)	38	16	5	17	63	77	−14	37	Qualification for the relegation playoffs
16	Eldense (O)	38	16	3	19	67	78	−11	35	Qualification for the relegation playoffs
17	Mestalla (R)	38	13	8	17	61	75	−14	34	Relegation to Tercera División
18	España de Algeciras (R)	38	14	3	21	60	83	−23	31	Relegation to Tercera División
19	Puente Genil (R)	38	12	3	23	44	81	−37	27 (Note: Puente Genil finished ahead of Castellón on head-to-head points: Castellón–Puente Genil 1–1, Puente Genil–Castellón 4–1)	Relegation to Tercera División
20	Castellón (R)	38	9	9	20	42	64	−22	27	Relegation to Tercera División

Source: BDFútbol
Rules for classification: 1) points; 2) head-to-head points; 3) head-to-head goal difference; 4) goal difference; 5) number of goals scored
(O) Play-off winners; (P) Promoted; (R) Relegated

=== Results ===
Home \ Away	ALG	ALI	CEU	BAD	CAD	CAS	COR	ELD	EXT	GRA	HER	LEV	CDM	MES	MUR	PGE	BET	SFE	TEN	XER
España Algeciras	—	3–0	1–1	3–1	1–0	3–1	3–0	2–0	1–2	0–1	5–1	5–0	2–2	2–0	3–1	2–0	0–1	4–1	4–1	3–2
Alicante	4–3	—	4–2	2–0	1–1	2–1	2–1	3–1	3–0	0–1	0–1	2–0	3–3	3–3	4–1	2–0	1–3	3–1	2–1	4–0
Atlético Ceuta	1–0	3–0	—	1–2	4–0	4–1	2–2	2–1	4–0	1–0	0–0	2–2	2–0	2–1	2–0	2–0	3–0	2–0	1–0	2–1
Badajoz	5–0	6–2	2–3	—	3–2	2–0	2–1	2–0	2–0	3–2	2–0	4–0	1–0	5–3	3–1	2–0	0–3	5–1	1–0	2–1
Cádiz	2–1	4–2	0–2	1–0	—	3–0	2–2	7–4	3–0	2–0	1–0	3–3	1–0	1–0	5–2	2–0	2–1	2–3	2–0	2–1
Castellón	2–0	1–1	1–1	0–0	2–2	—	1–0	3–1	0–0	0–0	1–2	2–4	2–1	1–2	1–2	1–1	1–0	3–0	1–0	1–0
Córdoba	9–1	2–0	5–2	5–1	5–0	3–2	—	8–1	3–0	1–0	4–3	6–1	3–0	1–1	3–1	2–0	3–2	4–0	7–4	5–2
Eldense	1–0	2–0	3–2	2–1	3–0	1–0	4–0	—	4–1	1–4	1–2	2–1	1–0	2–1	2–0	5–0	3–5	1–1	4–1	3–0
Extremadura	3–1	3–1	3–0	1–0	2–0	4–1	3–2	4–3	—	2–1	1–2	0–0	0–2	5–3	2–0	4–1	4–2	4–1	3–0	2–0
Granada	3–0	4–0	3–0	4–1	3–1	1–2	5–1	3–0	4–1	—	2–2	6–1	2–3	3–0	4–2	5–0	1–0	0–0	3–0	3–1
Hércules	9–1	1–2	4–0	3–0	0–2	4–1	2–1	3–1	3–0	1–2	—	3–1	2–1	2–1	1–1	1–0	0–0	4–2	1–0	2–3
Levante	3–0	0–0	2–0	3–2	6–0	2–0	2–3	0–0	2–2	3–0	1–1	—	4–2	2–0	1–0	1–0	2–0	1–2	1–1	6–1
Málaga	5–0	3–1	3–0	1–1	5–0	2–2	1–1	4–1	2–0	1–0	4–0	1–3	—	2–0	1–2	3–0	1–1	4–1	2–0	0–0
Mestalla	1–1	0–4	1–0	1–1	3–1	1–1	3–0	3–2	3–0	3–1	3–1	1–1	2–3	—	1–1	5–2	2–5	3–0	1–0	0–0
Murcia	6–0	3–0	2–0	3–0	3–0	3–2	3–0	0–0	3–2	3–0	0–1	2–1	2–0	3–0	—	4–0	1–3	4–2	3–0	3–0
Puente Genil	2–1	1–2	3–0	2–0	0–0	4–1	1–0	4–2	0–2	1–3	0–2	3–0	1–1	3–4	3–0	—	2–0	4–1	0–4	2–0
Real Betis	2–0	4–0	3–0	2–2	5–2	3–1	0–0	4–1	7–0	3–0	4–0	2–2	0–2	1–2	1–2	3–0	—	5–1	1–3	0–0
San Fernando	3–2	5–1	2–0	3–0	2–0	1–0	1–0	5–2	2–0	0–3	2–0	4–2	1–1	4–1	1–0	3–4	2–0	—	4–2	0–1
Tenerife	3–1	4–1	5–0	1–1	2–1	2–1	2–1	1–2	4–1	1–2	1–1	3–1	2–0	6–1	0–0	5–0	4–3	5–1	—	2–0
Xerez	4–1	5–1	1–0	7–2	1–1	2–1	6–2	1–0	1–0	4–0	1–1	3–0	1–1	3–1	1–1	6–0	1–1	2–0	1–1	—

Source: BDFútbol
Legend: Blue = home team win; Yellow = draw; Red = away team win.

=== Top goalscorers ===
Goalscorers	Goals	Team
(Spain) Juan Araujo	28	Córdoba
(Spain) Antonio Pedrero	25	Tenerife
(Spain) Gilberto Navarro	21	Granada
(Spain) Rafael Queralt	19	Alicante
(Spain) Sebastián Fustero	17	Eldense

=== Top goalkeepers ===
Goalkeeper	Goals	Matches	Average	Team
(Spain) Dionisio del Río	44	38	1.16	Málaga
(Spain) Juan García	48	38	1.26	Murcia
(Spain) Cuco	31	24	1.29	Tenerife
(Spain) José Campillo	47	36	1.31	Hércules
(Spain) Eugenio Ruiz	42	32	1.31	Real Betis

== Relegation playoffs ==
=== First leg ===
23 June 1957	La Felguera	8–0	Binéfar	Langreo
	Martín Esperanza 1', 37', 43'; Calleja 15', 51'; Celso 42'; Martín 54'; Ruiz 57'	Report		Stadium: La Barraca; Referee: Feal Seijas

23 June 1957	Ferrol	1–0	Turista	Ferrol
	Ton 82' (pen.)	Report		Stadium: Manuel Rivera; Referee: Alonso Sádaba

23 June 1957	Gandía	1–1	Alicante	Gandia
	Soro 75'	Report	Magán 21'	Stadium: Montduver; Referee: Pardo Salgado

23 June 1957	Calvo Sotelo	4–1	Eldense	Puertollano
	Herráez 18', 62'; Pérez Hurtado 50' (pen.), 78'	Report	Fustero 64'	Stadium: Cerru; Referee: Castillo Izquierdo

=== Second leg ===
29 June 1957	Turista	0–2 (0–3 agg.)	Ferrol	Vigo
		Report	Sampedro 26', 75'	Stadium: Balaídos; Referee: Gómez Contreras

30 June 1957	Alicante	3–0 (4–1 agg.)	Gandía	Alicante
	Magán 25', 37'; Herrerita 44'	Report		Stadium: Bardín; Referee: Domingo Vives

30 June 1957	Binéfar	2–0 (2–8 agg.)	La Felguera	Binéfar
	Miquel 20' (pen.); Citoler 88'	Report		Stadium: El Segalar; Referee: Balaguer Escuder

30 June 1957	Eldense	7–0 (8–4 agg.)	Calvo Sotelo	Elda
	Manso 25', 65'; Cárcamo 44', 80'; Grande 58'; Fustero 60', 77'	Report		Stadium: Parque; Referee: Pardo Salgado
