= 1955–56 Tercera División =

Tercera División
- Season: 1955–56

The 1955–56 Tercera División season was the 20th since its establishment.

== League table ==
=== Group 1 ===
==== Regular season ====
| Pos | Team | Pld | W | D | L | GF | GA | GD | Pts | Qualification |
|---|---|---|---|---|---|---|---|---|---|---|
| 1 | Orense | 18 | 10 | 4 | 4 | 33 | 18 | +15 | 24 | Promotion play-offs |
| 2 | Turista | 18 | 9 | 6 | 3 | 35 | 21 | +14 | 24 | Promotion play-offs |
| 3 | Arsenal Ferrol | 18 | 9 | 4 | 5 | 41 | 28 | +13 | 22 | |
| 4 | Juvenil | 18 | 7 | 6 | 5 | 28 | 23 | +5 | 20 | |
| 5 | Lemos | 18 | 8 | 2 | 8 | 29 | 30 | −1 | 18 | |
| 6 | Pontevedra | 18 | 8 | 2 | 8 | 27 | 30 | −3 | 18 | |
| 7 | Fabril | 18 | 7 | 2 | 9 | 39 | 34 | +5 | 16 | |
| 8 | Puenteareas | 18 | 5 | 6 | 7 | 19 | 36 | −17 | 16 | |
| 9 | Lugo | 18 | 6 | 0 | 12 | 33 | 40 | −7 | 12 | |
| 10 | Brigantium | 18 | 3 | 4 | 11 | 23 | 47 | −24 | 10 | |

==== Permanence Phase ====
| Pos | Team | Pld | W | D | L | GF | GA | GD | Pts | Qualification |
|---|---|---|---|---|---|---|---|---|---|---|
| 1 | Lemos | 18 | 10 | 3 | 5 | 37 | 23 | +14 | 23 | Tercera División play-offs |
| 2 | Gran Peña | 18 | 10 | 2 | 6 | 41 | 32 | +9 | 22 | |
| 3 | Arsenal Ferrol | 18 | 9 | 3 | 6 | 40 | 22 | +18 | 21 | |
| 4 | Fabril | 18 | 9 | 1 | 8 | 36 | 33 | +3 | 19 | |
| 5 | Órdenes | 18 | 6 | 5 | 7 | 34 | 40 | −6 | 17 | |
| 6 | Lugo | 18 | 7 | 2 | 9 | 23 | 36 | −13 | 16 | |
| 7 | Juvenil | 18 | 7 | 2 | 9 | 30 | 34 | −4 | 16 | |
| 8 | Brigantium | 18 | 6 | 4 | 8 | 26 | 29 | −3 | 16 | |
| 9 | Pontevedra | 18 | 6 | 3 | 9 | 29 | 38 | −9 | 15 | |
| 10 | Puenteareas | 18 | 6 | 3 | 9 | 26 | 35 | −9 | 15 | |

=== Group 2 ===
==== Regular season ====
| Pos | Team | Pld | W | D | L | GF | GA | GD | Pts | Qualification |
|---|---|---|---|---|---|---|---|---|---|---|
| 1 | Langreano | 18 | 14 | 1 | 3 | 43 | 14 | +29 | 29 | Promotion play-offs |
| 2 | Avilés | 18 | 13 | 2 | 3 | 45 | 16 | +29 | 28 | Promotion play-offs |
| 3 | Entrego | 18 | 8 | 4 | 6 | 40 | 43 | −3 | 20 | |
| 4 | Santoña | 18 | 8 | 2 | 8 | 28 | 35 | −7 | 18 | |
| 5 | Rayo Cantabria | 18 | 7 | 3 | 8 | 38 | 34 | +4 | 17 | |
| 6 | Calzada | 18 | 4 | 7 | 7 | 28 | 34 | −6 | 15 | |
| 7 | Titánico | 18 | 5 | 4 | 9 | 29 | 36 | −7 | 14 | |
| 8 | G. Torrelavega | 18 | 6 | 2 | 10 | 21 | 30 | −9 | 14 | |
| 9 | Turón | 18 | 5 | 3 | 10 | 28 | 40 | −12 | 13 | |
| 10 | Juvencia C.F^{ast} | 18 | 4 | 4 | 10 | 21 | 39 | −18 | 12 | |

==== Permanence Phase ====
| Pos | Team | Pld | W | D | L | GF | GA | GD | Pts | Qualification |
|---|---|---|---|---|---|---|---|---|---|---|
| 1 | G. Torrelavega | 18 | 12 | 1 | 5 | 35 | 13 | +22 | 25 | Tercera División play-offs |
| 2 | Marino | 18 | 8 | 6 | 4 | 29 | 22 | +7 | 22 | |
| 3 | Santoña | 18 | 9 | 4 | 5 | 32 | 23 | +9 | 22 | |
| 4 | Entrego | 18 | 9 | 3 | 6 | 30 | 27 | +3 | 21 | |
| 5 | Calzada | 18 | 5 | 8 | 5 | 30 | 36 | −6 | 18 | |
| 6 | Rayo Cantabria | 18 | 8 | 1 | 9 | 27 | 29 | −2 | 17 | |
| 7 | Juvencia | 18 | 6 | 4 | 8 | 25 | 35 | −10 | 16 | |
| 8 | Turón | 18 | 6 | 4 | 8 | 33 | 37 | −4 | 16 | |
| 9 | Titánico | 18 | 6 | 2 | 10 | 37 | 37 | 0 | 14 | |
| 10 | Laredo | 18 | 3 | 3 | 12 | 32 | 51 | −19 | 9 | |

=== Group 3 ===
| Pos | Team | Pld | W | D | L | GF | GA | GD | Pts | Qualification |
|---|---|---|---|---|---|---|---|---|---|---|
| 1 | Burgos | 22 | 16 | 3 | 3 | 64 | 21 | +43 | 35 | Promotion play-offs |
| 2 | Durango | 22 | 11 | 6 | 5 | 37 | 26 | +11 | 28 | Promotion play-offs |
| 3 | Guecho | 22 | 8 | 10 | 4 | 35 | 27 | +8 | 26 | |
| 4 | Erandio | 22 | 11 | 4 | 7 | 39 | 31 | +8 | 26 | |
| 5 | Arenas de Guecho | 22 | 10 | 6 | 6 | 38 | 24 | +14 | 26 | |
| 6 | Basconia | 22 | 8 | 7 | 7 | 46 | 41 | +5 | 23 | |
| 7 | Portugalete | 22 | 6 | 8 | 8 | 35 | 41 | −6 | 20 | |
| 8 | Valmaseda | 22 | 9 | 2 | 11 | 35 | 45 | −10 | 20 | |
| 9 | Padura | 22 | 5 | 8 | 9 | 27 | 39 | −12 | 18 | |
| 10 | Begoña | 22 | 5 | 6 | 11 | 34 | 44 | −10 | 16 | |
| 11 | Villosa | 22 | 5 | 4 | 13 | 30 | 50 | −20 | 14 | |
| 12 | Bermeo | 22 | 4 | 4 | 14 | 35 | 66 | −31 | 12 | |

=== Group 4 ===
| Pos | Team | Pld | W | D | L | GF | GA | GD | Pts | Qualification |
|---|---|---|---|---|---|---|---|---|---|---|
| 1 | Elgóibar | 22 | 15 | 3 | 4 | 62 | 28 | +34 | 33 | Promotion play-offs |
| 2 | Villafranca | 22 | 12 | 3 | 7 | 51 | 32 | +19 | 27 | Promotion play-offs |
| 3 | Mondragón | 22 | 11 | 4 | 7 | 49 | 34 | +15 | 26 | |
| 4 | Tudelano | 22 | 9 | 8 | 5 | 40 | 29 | +11 | 26 | |
| 5 | Calahorra | 22 | 11 | 3 | 8 | 37 | 41 | −4 | 25 | |
| 6 | Touring | 22 | 8 | 6 | 8 | 41 | 34 | +7 | 22 | |
| 7 | Oberena | 22 | 8 | 5 | 9 | 39 | 42 | −3 | 21 | |
| 8 | Peña Sport | 22 | 8 | 4 | 10 | 21 | 27 | −6 | 20 | |
| 9 | Azkoyen | 22 | 5 | 9 | 8 | 33 | 49 | −16 | 19 | |
| 10 | Izarra | 22 | 4 | 9 | 9 | 26 | 45 | −19 | 17 | |
| 11 | Mirandés | 22 | 6 | 4 | 12 | 27 | 42 | −15 | 16 | |
| 12 | Recreación de Logroño | 22 | 4 | 4 | 14 | 35 | 58 | −23 | 12 | |

=== Group 5 ===
| Pos | Team | Pld | W | D | L | GF | GA | GD | Pts | Qualification |
|---|---|---|---|---|---|---|---|---|---|---|
| 1 | Amistad Zaragoza | 18 | 9 | 5 | 4 | 31 | 21 | +10 | 23 | Promotion play-offs |
| 2 | Arenas Zaragoza | 18 | 9 | 5 | 4 | 34 | 17 | +17 | 23 | Promotion play-offs |
| 3 | Calatayud | 18 | 10 | 3 | 5 | 33 | 25 | +8 | 23 | |
| 4 | Binéfar | 18 | 8 | 2 | 8 | 40 | 36 | +4 | 18 | |
| 5 | Montañanesa | 18 | 8 | 1 | 9 | 23 | 30 | −7 | 17 | |
| 6 | Huesca | 18 | 7 | 3 | 8 | 33 | 32 | +1 | 17 | |
| 7 | Numancia | 18 | 7 | 3 | 8 | 34 | 37 | −3 | 17 | |
| 8 | Tauste | 18 | 7 | 3 | 8 | 31 | 35 | −4 | 17 | |
| 9 | Gallur | 18 | 7 | 1 | 10 | 29 | 36 | −7 | 15 | |
| 10 | Utebo | 18 | 4 | 2 | 12 | 21 | 40 | −19 | 10 | |

=== Group 6 ===
| Pos | Team | Pld | W | D | L | GF | GA | GD | Pts | Qualification |
|---|---|---|---|---|---|---|---|---|---|---|
| 1 | Manresa | 22 | 11 | 7 | 4 | 49 | 27 | +22 | 29 | Promotion play-offs |
| 2 | Girona | 22 | 12 | 5 | 5 | 50 | 33 | +17 | 29 | Promotion play-offs |
| 3 | Europa | 22 | 12 | 3 | 7 | 48 | 29 | +19 | 27 | |
| 4 | Artiguense | 22 | 13 | 0 | 9 | 55 | 42 | +13 | 26 | |
| 5 | Badalona | 22 | 10 | 5 | 7 | 45 | 43 | +2 | 25 | |
| 6 | Moncada | 22 | 9 | 4 | 9 | 35 | 43 | −8 | 22 | |
| 7 | Sans | 22 | 7 | 8 | 7 | 40 | 41 | −1 | 22 | |
| 8 | Vich | 22 | 8 | 5 | 9 | 40 | 45 | −5 | 21 | |
| 9 | Mataró | 22 | 9 | 2 | 11 | 40 | 51 | −11 | 20 | |
| 10 | Puigreig | 22 | 7 | 4 | 11 | 41 | 54 | −13 | 18 | |
| 11 | Júpiter | 22 | 5 | 7 | 10 | 28 | 45 | −17 | 17 | |
| 12 | Horta | 22 | 3 | 2 | 17 | 30 | 48 | −18 | 8 | |

=== Group 7 ===
| Pos | Team | Pld | W | D | L | GF | GA | GD | Pts | Qualification |
|---|---|---|---|---|---|---|---|---|---|---|
| 1 | Granollers | 22 | 11 | 6 | 5 | 55 | 39 | +16 | 28 | Promotion play-offs |
| 2 | Tortosa | 22 | 12 | 3 | 7 | 49 | 36 | +13 | 27 | Promotion play-offs |
| 3 | Amposta | 22 | 11 | 4 | 7 | 48 | 34 | +14 | 26 | |
| 4 | G. Tarragona | 22 | 11 | 4 | 7 | 36 | 32 | +4 | 26 | |
| 5 | Hércules | 22 | 11 | 3 | 8 | 54 | 42 | +12 | 25 | |
| 6 | Pueblo Seco | 22 | 9 | 5 | 8 | 32 | 39 | −7 | 23 | |
| 7 | La Cava | 22 | 10 | 1 | 11 | 51 | 40 | +11 | 21 | |
| 8 | San Andrés | 22 | 8 | 4 | 10 | 33 | 36 | −3 | 20 | |
| 9 | Reus | 22 | 7 | 5 | 10 | 37 | 51 | −14 | 19 | |
| 10 | San Martín | 22 | 6 | 6 | 10 | 41 | 44 | −3 | 18 | |
| 11 | Pueblo Nuevo | 22 | 7 | 4 | 11 | 35 | 52 | −17 | 18 | |
| 12 | Mollet | 22 | 6 | 1 | 15 | 26 | 52 | −26 | 13 | |

=== Group 8 ===
==== Mallorca ====
| Pos | Team | Pld | W | D | L | GF | GA | GD | Pts | Qualification |
|---|---|---|---|---|---|---|---|---|---|---|
| 1 | At. Baleares | 18 | 12 | 3 | 3 | 57 | 34 | +23 | 27 | Promotion play-offs |
| 2 | Mallorca | 18 | 11 | 3 | 4 | 50 | 31 | +19 | 25 | Play-offs Group 8 |
| 3 | Poblense | 18 | 8 | 3 | 7 | 43 | 40 | +3 | 19 | |
| 4 | Manacor | 18 | 7 | 4 | 7 | 33 | 32 | +1 | 18 | |
| 5 | España | 18 | 8 | 2 | 8 | 34 | 32 | +2 | 18 | |
| 6 | Soledad | 18 | 6 | 4 | 8 | 29 | 39 | −10 | 16 | |
| 7 | Constancia | 18 | 7 | 1 | 10 | 35 | 43 | −8 | 15 | |
| 8 | Binissalem | 18 | 5 | 5 | 8 | 28 | 39 | −11 | 15 | |
| 9 | Santañy | 18 | 7 | 0 | 11 | 24 | 38 | −14 | 14 | |
| 10 | Porreras | 18 | 5 | 3 | 10 | 30 | 35 | −5 | 13 | |

==== Menorca ====
| Pos | Team | Pld | W | D | L | GF | GA | GD | Pts | Qualification |
|---|---|---|---|---|---|---|---|---|---|---|
| 1 | Mahón | 8 | 7 | 0 | 1 | 26 | 11 | +15 | 14 | Play-offs Group 8 |
| 2 | Menorca | 8 | 4 | 2 | 2 | 15 | 12 | +3 | 10 | |
| 3 | Alaior | 8 | 2 | 4 | 2 | 14 | 14 | 0 | 8 | |
| 4 | Ciudadela | 8 | 3 | 1 | 4 | 14 | 20 | −6 | 7 | |
| 5 | Minerva | 8 | 0 | 1 | 7 | 6 | 18 | −12 | 1 | |

==== Play-offs ====
| Team 1 | Agg. | Team 2 | 1st leg | 2nd leg |
|---|---|---|---|---|
| Mallorca | 5 - 5 | Mahón | 4 - 0 | 1 - 5 |

- Tiebreaker:

| Team 1 | Score | Team 2 |
|---|---|---|
| Mallorca | 1 - 2 (a.e.t.) | Mahón |

=== Group 9 ===
| Pos | Team | Pld | W | D | L | GF | GA | GD | Pts | Qualification |
|---|---|---|---|---|---|---|---|---|---|---|
| 1 | Levante | 18 | 12 | 4 | 2 | 43 | 17 | +26 | 28 | Promotion play-offs |
| 2 | Alicante | 18 | 12 | 2 | 4 | 48 | 22 | +26 | 26 | Promotion play-offs |
| 3 | Gandía | 18 | 9 | 1 | 8 | 27 | 24 | +3 | 19 | |
| 4 | Alcoyano | 18 | 8 | 3 | 7 | 26 | 22 | +4 | 19 | |
| 5 | Acero | 18 | 8 | 2 | 8 | 30 | 29 | +1 | 18 | |
| 6 | Burriana | 18 | 6 | 3 | 9 | 23 | 33 | −10 | 15 | |
| 7 | Alcira | 18 | 6 | 3 | 9 | 30 | 38 | −8 | 15 | |
| 8 | Onteniente | 18 | 5 | 4 | 9 | 28 | 34 | −6 | 14 | |
| 9 | Albacete | 18 | 6 | 1 | 11 | 27 | 39 | −12 | 13 | |
| 10 | Peña D. Soriano | 18 | 5 | 3 | 10 | 22 | 46 | −24 | 13 | |

=== Group 10 ===
| Pos | Team | Pld | W | D | L | GF | GA | GD | Pts | Qualification |
|---|---|---|---|---|---|---|---|---|---|---|
| 1 | Eldense | 22 | 16 | 1 | 5 | 88 | 22 | +66 | 33 | Promotion play-offs |
| 2 | Cartagenera | 22 | 15 | 1 | 6 | 74 | 41 | +33 | 31 | Promotion play-offs |
| 3 | Elche | 22 | 15 | 1 | 6 | 64 | 30 | +34 | 31 | |
| 4 | Hellín | 22 | 13 | 4 | 5 | 57 | 28 | +29 | 30 | |
| 5 | Novelda | 22 | 12 | 3 | 7 | 48 | 39 | +9 | 27 | |
| 6 | Lorca | 22 | 12 | 1 | 9 | 40 | 40 | 0 | 25 | |
| 7 | Callosa | 22 | 7 | 3 | 12 | 38 | 53 | −15 | 17 | |
| 8 | Imperial Murcia | 22 | 6 | 5 | 11 | 37 | 50 | −13 | 17 | |
| 9 | Yeclano | 22 | 7 | 2 | 13 | 34 | 64 | −30 | 16 | |
| 10 | Almansa | 22 | 7 | 1 | 14 | 37 | 71 | −34 | 15 | |
| 11 | Orihuela | 22 | 3 | 5 | 14 | 32 | 68 | −36 | 11 | |
| 12 | Cieza | 22 | 4 | 3 | 15 | 32 | 75 | −43 | 11 | |

=== Group 11 ===
| Pos | Team | Pld | W | D | L | GF | GA | GD | Pts | Qualification |
|---|---|---|---|---|---|---|---|---|---|---|
| 1 | Algeciras | 22 | 18 | 1 | 3 | 79 | 27 | +52 | 37 | Promotion play-offs |
| 2 | Linense | 22 | 15 | 0 | 7 | 78 | 30 | +48 | 30 | Promotion play-offs |
| 3 | Peñarroya | 22 | 10 | 5 | 7 | 50 | 47 | +3 | 25 | |
| 4 | Puerto | 22 | 11 | 3 | 8 | 39 | 45 | −6 | 25 | |
| 5 | Utrera | 22 | 10 | 3 | 9 | 61 | 48 | +13 | 23 | |
| 6 | Coria | 22 | 9 | 4 | 9 | 33 | 38 | −5 | 22 | |
| 7 | Recreativo Huelva | 22 | 10 | 2 | 10 | 46 | 42 | +4 | 22 | |
| 8 | Portuense | 22 | 9 | 3 | 10 | 40 | 37 | +3 | 21 | |
| 9 | Constantina | 22 | 8 | 3 | 11 | 37 | 60 | −23 | 19 | |
| 10 | Lora | 22 | 6 | 4 | 12 | 28 | 56 | −28 | 16 | |
| 11 | Chiclana | 22 | 6 | 2 | 14 | 27 | 59 | −32 | 14 | |
| 12 | Ronda | 22 | 4 | 2 | 16 | 31 | 60 | −29 | 10 | |

=== Group 12 ===
| Pos | Team | Pld | W | D | L | GF | GA | GD | Pts | Qualification |
|---|---|---|---|---|---|---|---|---|---|---|
| 1 | Córdoba | 22 | 16 | 2 | 4 | 53 | 18 | +35 | 34 | Promotion play-offs |
| 2 | At. Almería | 22 | 13 | 2 | 7 | 60 | 31 | +29 | 28 | Promotion play-offs |
| 3 | Úbeda | 22 | 12 | 2 | 8 | 48 | 32 | +16 | 26 | |
| 4 | Pontanés | 22 | 12 | 1 | 9 | 49 | 34 | +15 | 25 | |
| 5 | Iliturgi | 22 | 10 | 3 | 9 | 48 | 48 | 0 | 23 | |
| 6 | Motril | 22 | 11 | 1 | 10 | 42 | 46 | −4 | 23 | |
| 7 | Antequerano | 22 | 10 | 3 | 9 | 54 | 47 | +7 | 23 | |
| 8 | R. Granada | 22 | 9 | 3 | 10 | 33 | 50 | −17 | 21 | |
| 9 | Linares | 22 | 9 | 1 | 12 | 44 | 55 | −11 | 19 | |
| 10 | Martos | 22 | 8 | 3 | 11 | 32 | 47 | −15 | 19 | |
| 11 | At. Malagueño | 22 | 7 | 1 | 14 | 34 | 51 | −17 | 15 | |
| 12 | Bastetano | 22 | 2 | 4 | 16 | 28 | 66 | −38 | 8 | |

=== Group 13 ===
| Pos | Team | Pld | W | D | L | GF | GA | GD | Pts | Qualification |
|---|---|---|---|---|---|---|---|---|---|---|
| 1 | Ceuta | 18 | 14 | 2 | 2 | 56 | 16 | +40 | 30 | Promotion play-offs |
| 2 | Melilla | 18 | 13 | 1 | 4 | 56 | 19 | +37 | 27 | Promotion play-offs |
| 3 | Español Tetuán | 18 | 10 | 3 | 5 | 44 | 30 | +14 | 23 | |
| 4 | Larache | 18 | 10 | 1 | 7 | 36 | 34 | +2 | 21 | |
| 5 | África Ceutí | 18 | 8 | 1 | 9 | 37 | 36 | +1 | 17 | |
| 6 | Unión Tangerina | 18 | 6 | 4 | 8 | 32 | 31 | +1 | 16 | |
| 7 | Villa Nador | 18 | 6 | 2 | 10 | 29 | 38 | −9 | 14 | |
| 8 | Pescadores | 18 | 6 | 2 | 10 | 25 | 52 | −27 | 14 | |
| 9 | Alcázar | 18 | 5 | 2 | 11 | 15 | 39 | −24 | 8 | |
| 10 | Alcazaba | 18 | 2 | 2 | 14 | 18 | 53 | −35 | 6 | |

=== Group 14 ===
| Pos | Team | Pld | W | D | L | GF | GA | GD | Pts | Qualification |
|---|---|---|---|---|---|---|---|---|---|---|
| 1 | Don Benito | 18 | 12 | 2 | 4 | 53 | 23 | +30 | 26 | Promotion play-offs |
| 2 | Cacereño | 18 | 13 | 0 | 5 | 50 | 22 | +28 | 26 | Promotion play-offs |
| 3 | Emeritense | 18 | 12 | 1 | 5 | 45 | 26 | +19 | 25 | |
| 4 | Calvo Sotelo | 18 | 11 | 1 | 6 | 50 | 25 | +25 | 23 | |
| 5 | Manchego | 18 | 11 | 0 | 7 | 42 | 26 | +16 | 22 | |
| 6 | Plasencia | 18 | 7 | 3 | 8 | 33 | 35 | −2 | 17 | |
| 7 | Metalúrgica | 18 | 6 | 3 | 9 | 33 | 37 | −4 | 15 | |
| 8 | Villanovense | 18 | 5 | 2 | 11 | 32 | 55 | −23 | 12 | |
| 9 | Azuaga | 18 | 5 | 2 | 11 | 18 | 51 | −33 | 12 | |
| 10 | Montijo | 18 | 1 | 0 | 17 | 15 | 71 | −56 | 0 | |

=== Group 15 ===
| Pos | Team | Pld | W | D | L | GF | GA | GD | Pts | Qualification |
|---|---|---|---|---|---|---|---|---|---|---|
| 1 | Salamanca | 18 | 14 | 0 | 4 | 55 | 21 | +34 | 28 | Promotion play-offs |
| 2 | At. Palencia | 18 | 11 | 3 | 4 | 48 | 28 | +20 | 25 | Promotion play-offs |
| 3 | Júpiter Leonés | 18 | 10 | 1 | 7 | 47 | 34 | +13 | 21 | |
| 4 | At. Zamora | 18 | 8 | 4 | 6 | 32 | 20 | +12 | 20 | |
| 5 | Europa Delicias | 18 | 9 | 1 | 8 | 43 | 29 | +14 | 19 | |
| 6 | Ponferradina | 18 | 7 | 4 | 7 | 35 | 34 | +1 | 18 | |
| 7 | G. Segoviana | 18 | 6 | 3 | 9 | 33 | 47 | −14 | 15 | |
| 8 | Castilla | 18 | 5 | 2 | 11 | 26 | 48 | −22 | 12 | |
| 9 | Béjar Industrial | 18 | 5 | 2 | 11 | 27 | 61 | −34 | 12 | |
| 10 | Ávila | 18 | 4 | 2 | 12 | 24 | 48 | −24 | 10 | |

=== Group 16 ===
| Pos | Team | Pld | W | D | L | GF | GA | GD | Pts | Qualification |
|---|---|---|---|---|---|---|---|---|---|---|
| 1 | Rayo Vallecano | 18 | 13 | 2 | 3 | 50 | 24 | +26 | 28 | Promotion play-offs |
| 2 | Aranjuez | 18 | 12 | 3 | 3 | 45 | 25 | +20 | 27 | Promotion play-offs |
| 3 | Toledo | 18 | 10 | 2 | 6 | 44 | 32 | +12 | 22 | |
| 4 | Leganés | 18 | 6 | 8 | 4 | 29 | 29 | 0 | 20 | |
| 5 | Carabanchel | 18 | 7 | 3 | 8 | 39 | 40 | −1 | 17 | |
| 6 | Guadalajara | 18 | 7 | 2 | 9 | 30 | 40 | −10 | 16 | |
| 7 | Parque Móvil | 18 | 7 | 1 | 10 | 34 | 33 | +1 | 15 | |
| 8 | Cuatro Caminos | 18 | 5 | 4 | 9 | 45 | 53 | −8 | 14 | |
| 9 | Girod | 18 | 5 | 2 | 11 | 22 | 32 | −10 | 12 | |
| 10 | Conquense | 18 | 3 | 3 | 12 | 18 | 48 | −30 | 9 | |

== Promotion play-offs ==
=== Group 1 ===
| Pos | Team | Pld | W | D | L | GF | GA | GD | Pts | QP |
|---|---|---|---|---|---|---|---|---|---|---|
| 1 | Burgos | 14 | 9 | 3 | 2 | 32 | 15 | +17 | 21 | Promotion to the Segunda División |
| 2 | Avilés | 14 | 9 | 2 | 3 | 34 | 16 | +18 | 20 | Tercera División play-offs |
| 3 | Orense | 14 | 8 | 3 | 3 | 23 | 12 | +11 | 19 | Promotion/relegation play-offs |
| 4 | Salamanca | 14 | 8 | 2 | 4 | 20 | 13 | +7 | 18 | |
| 5 | At. Palencia | 14 | 5 | 1 | 8 | 16 | 28 | −12 | 11 | |
| 6 | Langreano | 14 | 3 | 4 | 7 | 14 | 20 | −6 | 10 | |
| 7 | C. Durango | 14 | 3 | 1 | 10 | 18 | 36 | −18 | 7 | |
| 8 | Turista | 14 | 2 | 2 | 10 | 12 | 29 | −17 | 6 | |

=== Group 2 ===
| Pos | Team | Pld | W | D | L | GF | GA | GD | Pts | QP |
|---|---|---|---|---|---|---|---|---|---|---|
| 1 | Gerona | 14 | 10 | 2 | 2 | 42 | 19 | +23 | 22 | Promotion to the Segunda División |
| 2 | Rayo Vallecano | 14 | 9 | 1 | 4 | 35 | 20 | +15 | 19 | Tercera División play-offs |
| 3 | Manresa | 14 | 7 | 3 | 4 | 34 | 22 | +12 | 17 | Promotion/relegation play-offs |
| 4 | Arenas Zaragoza | 14 | 6 | 2 | 6 | 29 | 26 | +3 | 14 | |
| 5 | Elgóibar | 14 | 6 | 2 | 6 | 22 | 29 | −7 | 14 | |
| 6 | Villafranca | 14 | 5 | 2 | 7 | 27 | 36 | −9 | 12 | |
| 7 | Aranjuez | 14 | 3 | 3 | 8 | 32 | 43 | −11 | 9 | |
| 8 | Amistad Zaragoza | 14 | 2 | 1 | 11 | 13 | 39 | −26 | 5 | |

=== Group 3 ===
| Pos | Team | Pld | W | D | L | GF | GA | GD | Pts | QP |
|---|---|---|---|---|---|---|---|---|---|---|
| 1 | Levante | 14 | 10 | 0 | 4 | 37 | 16 | +21 | 20 | Promotion to the Segunda División |
| 2 | Alicante | 14 | 9 | 2 | 3 | 22 | 13 | +9 | 20 | Tercera División play-offs |
| 3 | Eldense | 14 | 7 | 3 | 4 | 29 | 18 | +11 | 17 | Promotion/relegation play-offs |
| 4 | At. Baleares | 14 | 7 | 0 | 7 | 25 | 31 | −6 | 14 | |
| 5 | Cartagenera | 14 | 6 | 2 | 6 | 24 | 34 | −10 | 14 | |
| 6 | Mahón | 14 | 5 | 1 | 8 | 25 | 30 | −5 | 11 | |
| 7 | Tortosa | 14 | 4 | 1 | 9 | 26 | 28 | −2 | 9 | |
| 8 | Granollers | 14 | 3 | 1 | 10 | 20 | 38 | −18 | 7 | |

=== Group 4 ===
| Pos | Team | Pld | W | D | L | GF | GA | GD | Pts | QP |
|---|---|---|---|---|---|---|---|---|---|---|
| 1 | Córdoba | 14 | 9 | 1 | 4 | 42 | 11 | +31 | 19 | Promotion to the Segunda División |
| 2 | Linense | 14 | 8 | 1 | 5 | 32 | 23 | +9 | 17 | Tercera División play-offs |
| 3 | Algeciras | 14 | 8 | 0 | 6 | 35 | 25 | +10 | 16 | Promotion/relegation play-offs |
| 4 | At. Almería | 14 | 8 | 0 | 6 | 28 | 26 | +2 | 16 | |
| 5 | Ceuta | 14 | 6 | 2 | 6 | 38 | 28 | +10 | 14 | |
| 6 | Melilla | 14 | 6 | 1 | 7 | 19 | 39 | −20 | 13 | |
| 7 | Cacereño | 14 | 4 | 1 | 9 | 23 | 42 | −19 | 9 | |
| 8 | Don Benito | 14 | 3 | 2 | 9 | 18 | 41 | −23 | 8 | |

=== Promotion/relegation Segunda División ===
| Team 1 | Agg. | Team 2 | 1st leg | 2nd leg |
|---|---|---|---|---|
| Orense | - | Sestao | 2-1 | 0-3 |
| Logroñés | - | Manresa | 2-0 | 0-1 |
| Plus Ultra | - | Eldense | 3-3 | 0-3 |
| Castellón | - | Algeciras | 1-1 | 2-2 |

- Tiebreaker:

| Team 1 | Score | Team 2 |
|---|---|---|
| Castellón | 2 - 1 | Algeciras |

- Promotion to Segunda: Eldense
- Remain on Segunda:: Sestao, Logroñés & Castellón
- Relegation to Tercera: Plus Ultra

=== Tercera División play-offs ===
==== First round ====
| Team 1 | Agg. | Team 2 | 1st leg | 2nd leg |
|---|---|---|---|---|
| Arenas G. | - | At. Zamora | 2-0 | 1-2 |
| Lemos | - | G. Torrelavega | 4-2 | 0-4 |
| Mondragón | - | Utebo | 9-0 | 0-3 |
| G. Tarragona | - | Agromán | 3-2 | 1-0 |
| Badalona | - | Mallorca | 1-1 | 2-8 |
| Gandía | - | Elche | 4-0 | 4-2 |
| R. Huelva | - | Emeritense | 3-1 | 1-1 |
| Pontanés | - | África Ceutí | 4-0 | 0-0 |

==== Second round ====
| Team 1 | Agg. | Team 2 | 1st leg | 2nd leg |
|---|---|---|---|---|
| Arenas G. | - | G. Torrelavega | 1-0 | 0-3 |
| Mondragón | - | G. Tarragona | 4-2 | 0-5 |
| Mallorca | - | Gandía | 4-1 | 0-3 |
| R. Huelva | - | Pontanés | 2-1 | 0-2 |

- Tiebreaker:

| Team 1 | Score | Team 2 |
|---|---|---|
| Mallorca | 1 - 3 | Gandía |

==== Third round ====
| Team 1 | Agg. | Team 2 | 1st leg | 2nd leg |
|---|---|---|---|---|
| G. Torrelavega | - | Avilés | 0-3 | 1-4 |
| G. Tarragona | - | Rayo Vallecano | 2-1 | 2-5 |
| Gandía | - | Alicante | 3-7 | 0-0 |
| Pontanés | - | Linense | 2-0 | 0-2 |

- Tiebreaker:

| Team 1 | Score | Team 2 |
|---|---|---|
| Pontanés | 1 - 0 | Linense |

- Promotion to Segunda: Avilés, Rayo Vallecano, Alicante & Pontanés
