= 1962–63 Segunda División =

32nd season of the second-tier football league in Spain

Segunda División
- Season: 1962–63
- Champions: Pontevedra; Murcia
- Promoted: Pontevedra; Murcia; Español; Levante
- Relegated: Cartagena; Atlético Baleares; Jaén; Basconia; Sevilla Atlético; Sabadell; Plus Ultra
- Matches: 480
- Goals: 1,382 (2.88 per match)
- Top goalscorer: José Miguel Olano (31 goals)
- Best goalkeeper: José Campillo (0.67 goals/match)
- Biggest home win: Real Sociedad 11–1 Sabadell (11 November 1962)
- Biggest away win: Alavés 1–4 Real Sociedad (4 November 1962); Sabadell 0–3 Celta Vigo (10 February 1963)
- Highest scoring: Real Sociedad 11–1 Sabadell (11 November 1962)

The 1962–63 Segunda División season was the 32nd since its establishment and was played between 16 September 1962 and 21 April 1963.

== Overview before the season ==
32 teams joined the league, including 4 relegated from the 1961–62 La Liga and 5 promoted from the 1961–62 Tercera División.

Relegated from La Liga

- Español
- Real Santander
- Real Sociedad
- Tenerife

Promoted from Tercera División

- Langreo
- Constancia
- Eldense
- Sevilla Atlético
- Melilla

== Group North ==
=== Teams ===
Location of teams in Segunda División 1962–63 Group North

Club	City	Stadium
Deportivo Alavés	Vitoria	Mendizorroza
CD Atlético Baleares	Palma de Mallorca	Balear
CD Basconia	Basauri	Pedro López Cortázar
Burgos CF	Burgos	Zatorre
RC Celta de Vigo	Vigo	Balaídos
CD Constancia	Inca	Municipal d'Es Cos
RCD Español	Barcelona	Sarrià
Real Gijón CF	Gijón	El Molinón
SD Indauchu	Bilbao	Garellano
UP Langreo	Langreo	Ganzábal
CD Orense	Orense	José Antonio
Pontevedra CF	Pontevedra	Pasarón
Real Sociedad	San Sebastián	Atocha
CD Sabadell FC	Sabadell	Cruz Alta
Salamanca	Salamanca	El Calvario
Real Santander SD	Santander	El Sardinero

=== League table ===
Pos	Team	Pld	W	D	L	GF	GA	GD	Pts	Promotion, qualification or relegation
1	Pontevedra (P)	30	16	9	5	44	31	+13	41	Promotion to La Liga
2	Español (O, P)	30	17	5	8	40	24	+16	39	Qualification for the promotion playoffs
3	Real Santander	30	15	7	8	53	39	+14	37	
4	Real Sociedad	30	14	7	9	77	44	+33	35	
5	Real Gijón	30	16	2	12	50	46	+4	34	
6	Celta Vigo	30	13	6	11	47	31	+16	32	
7	Orense	30	14	3	13	43	37	+6	31	
8	Alavés	30	12	6	12	43	46	−3	30 (Note: Alavés finished ahead of Indauchu on head-to-head points: Alavés–Indauchu 2–1, Indauchu–Alavés 3–3)	
9	Indauchu	30	11	8	11	46	42	+4	30	
10	Burgos	30	12	5	13	39	47	−8	29	
11	Salamanca	30	10	7	13	40	46	−6	27	
12	Constancia	30	11	4	15	42	51	−9	26	
13	Langreo (O)	30	8	9	13	33	42	−9	25	Qualification for the relegation playoffs
14	Atlético Baleares (R)	30	9	5	16	37	51	−14	23	Qualification for the relegation playoffs
15	Basconia (R)	30	9	3	18	31	65	−34	21	Relegation to Tercera División
16	Sabadell (R)	30	8	4	18	43	66	−23	20	Relegation to Tercera División

Source: BDFútbol
Rules for classification: 1) points; 2) head-to-head points; 3) head-to-head goal difference; 4) goal difference; 5) number of goals scored
(O) Play-off winners; (P) Promoted; (R) Relegated

=== Top goalscorers ===
Goalscorers	Goals	Team
(Spain) José Miguel Olano	31	Real Sociedad
(Spain) Pedro Olalde	18	Burgos
(Spain) Abel Fernández	17	Real Santander
(Spain) Rafael Ceresuela	12	Pontevedra
(Spain) Joaquín Moya	12	Sabadell

=== Top goalkeepers ===
Goalkeeper	Goals	Matches	Average	Team
(Spain) Benito Joanet	19	22	0.86	Español
(Spain) José Antonio Cantero	29	29	1	Celta Vigo
(Spain) Javier Gato	31	30	1.03	Pontevedra
(Spain) Martín Gastesi	24	20	1.2	Real Sociedad
(Spain) José Ramón Ibarreche	27	22	1.23	Orense

=== Results ===
Home \ Away	ALA	BAL	BAS	BUR	CEL	CON	ESP	GIJ	IND	LAN	ORE	PON	RSO	SAB	SAL	SAT
Alavés	—	1–0	2–0	3–1	1–1	6–0	1–0	3–0	2–1	1–0	2–0	1–1	1–4	2–4	0–0	0–2
Atlético Baleares	2–1	—	3–0	3–0	2–1	1–1	0–1	1–2	0–1	1–1	0–2	0–2	2–1	3–1	3–2	1–1
Basconia	2–1	1–0	—	1–0	1–3	3–1	0–2	1–0	1–2	2–1	2–1	5–0	2–2	1–1	2–1	0–1
Burgos	3–0	4–0	5–0	—	1–0	1–0	0–0	2–1	2–2	2–1	0–2	2–3	0–0	2–1	2–0	2–0
Celta Vigo	1–2	0–2	2–0	2–1	—	5–0	3–0	2–1	0–0	0–0	1–0	2–0	6–1	4–1	0–1	1–3
Constancia	4–1	2–0	2–0	2–3	1–2	—	1–0	4–0	2–0	0–0	2–0	1–1	4–2	2–1	0–0	6–2
Español	2–1	2–1	4–0	2–0	3–1	1–0	—	5–0	0–0	2–1	3–0	1–2	0–0	1–0	3–0	1–0
Gijón	3–0	3–1	4–0	1–0	3–2	2–0	3–1	—	3–0	1–1	1–1	0–2	4–0	4–2	3–0	1–0
Indauchu	3–3	4–1	1–0	0–0	0–2	4–1	0–1	1–2	—	5–1	1–3	1–1	1–1	3–0	6–4	2–1
Langreo	0–1	2–4	2–1	1–1	1–1	1–0	0–1	2–0	3–1	—	2–2	0–0	1–0	1–0	3–3	3–0
Orense	1–0	2–0	6–0	0–1	2–1	1–0	1–2	4–2	1–0	2–0	—	3–0	1–0	2–0	1–1	0–1
Pontevedra	2–0	4–1	2–0	3–1	1–1	0–2	1–1	1–0	3–2	2–0	2–1	—	0–0	1–0	4–1	3–2
Real Sociedad	5–2	3–2	7–2	7–0	2–0	6–1	3–0	3–1	1–2	2–1	6–1	1–1	—	11–1	2–0	2–2
Sabadell	2–3	3–0	2–2	5–0	0–3	4–3	2–0	1–3	1–2	1–3	2–1	0–0	2–0	—	2–0	4–4
Salamanca	1–1	1–1	2–1	2–1	0–0	3–0	2–0	0–2	2–1	3–1	3–2	0–1	1–2	4–0	—	2–0
Santander	1–1	2–2	5–1	5–2	1–0	1–0	1–1	6–0	0–0	2–0	2–0	2–1	3–2	1–0	2–1	—

Source: BDFútbol
Legend: Blue = home team win; Yellow = draw; Red = away team win.

== Group South ==
=== Teams ===
Location of teams in Segunda División 1962–63 Group South
Canary Islands

Club	City	Stadium
Cádiz CF	Cádiz	Ramón de Carranza
CD Cartagena	Cartagena	El Almarjal
Eldense	Elda	El Parque
Granada CF	Granada	Los Cármenes
Hércules CF	Alicante	La Viña
Real Jaén CF	Jaén	La Victoria
UD Las Palmas	Las Palmas	Insular
Levante UD	Valencia	Vallejo
Melilla CF	Melilla	Álvarez Claro
CD Mestalla	Valencia	Mestalla
Real Murcia	Murcia	La Condomina
AD Plus Ultra	Madrid	Campo de Ciudad Lineal
Recreativo de Huelva	Huelva	Municipal
CD San Fernando	San Fernando	Marqués de Varela
Sevilla Atlético FC	Seville	Ramón Sánchez Pizjuán
CD Tenerife	Santa Cruz de Tenerife	Heliodoro Rodríguez López

=== League table ===
Pos	Team	Pld	W	D	L	GF	GA	GD	Pts	Promotion, qualification or relegation
1	Murcia (P)	30	18	6	6	40	20	+20	42	Promotion to La Liga
2	Levante (O, P)	30	18	5	7	61	34	+27	41	Qualification for the promotion playoffs
3	Las Palmas	30	16	6	8	45	32	+13	38	
4	Cádiz	30	17	3	10	49	46	+3	37	
5	Recreativo	30	9	14	7	40	26	+14	32	
6	Granada	30	12	6	12	38	29	+9	30	
7	Eldense	30	13	3	14	51	58	−7	29 (Note: Eldense finished ahead of Hércules, Mestalla and Tenerife on head-to-head points: Eldense 7 pts, Hércules 6 pts, Mestalla 6 pts, Tenerife 5 pts. Hércules finished ahead of Mestalla on head-to-head points: Mestalla–Hércules 4–4, Hércules–Mestalla 3–0)	
8	Hércules	30	12	5	13	51	42	+9	29	
9	Mestalla	30	11	7	12	50	55	−5	29	
10	Tenerife	30	11	7	12	42	34	+8	29	
11	Melilla	30	9	9	12	36	42	−6	27 (Note: Melilla finished ahead of San Fernando on overall goal difference)	
12	San Fernando	30	11	5	14	33	58	−25	27	
13	Cartagena (R)	30	9	8	13	40	53	−13	26	Qualification for the relegation playoffs
14	Jaén (R)	30	9	7	14	35	41	−6	25	Qualification for the relegation playoffs
15	Sevilla Atlético (R)	30	8	6	16	34	54	−20	22	Relegation to Tercera División
16	Plus Ultra (R)	30	6	5	19	29	50	−21	17	Relegation to Tercera División

Source: BDFútbol
Rules for classification: 1) points; 2) head-to-head points; 3) head-to-head goal difference; 4) goal difference; 5) number of goals scored
(O) Play-off winners; (P) Promoted; (R) Relegated

=== Top goalscorers ===
Goalscorers	Goals	Team
(Spain) Vicente Navarro	18	Mestalla
(Spain) Ángel Lizani	16	Eldense
(Spain) Ricardo García	16	Hércules
(Spain) Darwin	14	Eldense
(Spain) José Juan Alonso	13	Hércules

=== Top goalkeepers ===
Goalkeeper	Goals	Matches	Average	Team
(Spain) José Campillo	20	30	0.67	Murcia
(Spain) Miguel Ángel Molina	19	23	0.83	Recreativo
(Spain) José Luis Ulacia	24	23	1.04	Las Palmas
(Spain) Rodri	32	30	1.07	Levante
(Spain) José Sánchez Rojas	24	22	1.09	Jaén

=== Results ===
Home \ Away	CÁD	CAR	ELD	GRA	HÉR	JAÉ	LPA	LEV	MEL	MES	MUR	PLU	REC	SFE	SAT	TEN
Cádiz	—	2–1	6–0	3–1	3–1	2–1	2–0	2–1	1–0	3–1	3–1	2–1	3–1	2–0	2–1	1–0
Cartagena	3–1	—	0–0	1–1	1–0	3–1	2–2	0–1	2–2	1–1	1–0	3–1	1–1	4–2	3–1	1–0
Eldense	5–0	3–1	—	2–0	1–1	4–0	2–0	1–1	2–0	4–1	1–0	4–0	2–1	6–2	1–2	2–1
Granada	0–0	2–0	2–0	—	1–0	0–0	0–0	5–0	1–0	6–0	0–1	2–0	4–0	2–0	2–0	0–0
Hércules	2–0	6–1	2–3	3–1	—	1–0	0–1	2–3	2–0	3–0	2–1	2–0	1–0	3–1	5–3	5–0
Real Jaén	2–0	3–2	3–0	3–0	3–0	—	1–1	0–0	2–0	1–2	1–3	3–0	1–1	3–0	3–1	0–0
Las Palmas	2–1	3–1	6–0	3–0	3–1	1–0	—	1–0	3–2	3–1	1–0	1–0	0–0	2–0	3–2	0–1
Levante	7–2	2–1	4–1	1–0	2–1	6–1	3–0	—	2–0	4–2	1–2	3–0	2–1	3–1	2–0	3–1
Melilla	0–2	2–2	3–2	1–0	1–0	2–1	1–2	2–2	—	1–1	2–1	1–0	0–0	1–0	2–0	2–2
Mestalla	3–0	3–0	2–0	0–2	4–4	4–0	1–1	2–1	3–2	—	0–0	2–1	3–1	0–1	8–2	2–1
Real Murcia	0–0	2–0	3–1	2–1	1–0	2–1	2–1	1–1	2–1	3–1	—	1–0	1–0	4–1	2–0	3–0
Plus Ultra	3–0	1–2	4–1	2–1	1–1	3–0	1–1	0–2	3–5	4–1	0–0	—	0–0	0–1	0–0	2–0
Recreativo	2–1	0–0	4–0	4–0	1–1	0–0	4–1	0–0	0–0	3–0	0–0	2–0	—	8–1	1–1	2–1
San Fernando	1–1	4–1	3–2	2–2	2–2	1–0	1–0	2–1	2–1	1–0	0–1	2–1	1–1	—	1–0	0–0
Sevilla Atlético	2–3	3–2	2–1	0–2	1–0	1–1	3–2	2–0	1–1	1–1	0–0	2–0	0–1	2–0	—	1–2
Tenerife	4–1	3–0	4–0	1–0	3–0	1–0	0–1	1–3	1–1	1–1	0–1	5–1	1–1	5–0	3–0	—

Source: BDFútbol
Legend: Blue = home team win; Yellow = draw; Red = away team win.

== Promotion playoffs ==
=== First leg ===
12 May 1963	Español	2–1	Mallorca	Barcelona
	Castaños 47'; Boy 75'	Report	Pepillo 36'	Stadium: Sarriá; Referee: Birigay Nieva

26 May 1963	Deportivo La Coruña	1–2	Levante	A Coruña
	Montalvo 48' (pen.)	Report	Domínguez 47'; Wanderley 83'	Stadium: Riazor; Referee: Zariquiegui Izco

=== Second leg ===
19 May 1963	Mallorca	2–1 (3–3 agg.)	Español	Palma
	Bergara 27'; Sampedro 55' (pen.)	Report	Domínguez 45' (pen.)	Stadium: Lluís Sitjar; Referee: Ortiz de Mendibil

2 June 1963	Levante	2–1 (4–2 agg.)	Deportivo La Coruña	Valencia
	Serafín 43' (pen.); Vall 82'	Report	Montalvo 70'	Stadium: Vallejo; Referee: Gómez Contreras

=== Tiebreaker ===
23 May 1963	Español	1–0	Mallorca	Madrid
	Idígoras 77'	Report		Stadium: Santiago Bernabéu; Referee: Caballero Camacho

== Relegation playoffs ==
=== First leg ===
9 June 1963	Hospitalet	3–0	Jaén	L'Hospitalet de Llobregat
	Mauri 50'; Parés 62'; Julián 72'	Report		Stadium: Municipal; Referee: Clausí

9 June 1963	Algeciras	3–1	Atlético Baleares	Algeciras
	Martín Esperanza 13'; Tapia 35'; Beato 90'	Report	Mirlo 62'	Stadium: El Mirador; Referee: Bañón Gonzálbez

9 June 1963	Arenas	0–0	Langreo	Getxo
		Report		Stadium: Gobela; Referee: Barrenechea de Miguel

9 June 1963	Badalona	3–1	Cartagena	Badalona
	Viñas 3', 86'; Ruiz 60'	Report	Manceñido 52'	Stadium: Avenida de Navarra; Referee: Varas Gómez

=== Second leg ===
16 June 1963	Jaén	2–0 (2–3 agg.)	L'Hospitalet	Jaén
	Gea 11'; Rebellón 40' (pen.)	Report		Stadium: La Victoria; Referee: Canera Coscolín

16 June 1963	Atlético Baleares	2–0 (3–3 agg.)	Algeciras	Palma
	Matito 15'; Palacios 74'	Report		Stadium: Balear; Referee: Oliva Fortuny

16 June 1963	Langreo	2–0 (2–0 agg.)	Arenas	Langreo
	Marañón 23'; Manolito 88'	Report		Stadium: Ganzábal; Referee: Feal Seijas

16 June 1963	Cartagena	1–1 (2–4 agg.)	Badalona	Cartagena
	Navarro 42'	Report	Andresín 53'	Stadium: El Almarjal; Referee: Tomás López

=== Tiebreaker ===
19 June 1963	Algeciras	2–1	Atlético Baleares	Valencia
	Pastor 3' (o.g.); Periquito 82'	Report	Csóka 62' (pen.)	Stadium: Vallejo; Referee: Torres Bernabéu
