= Martín Esperanza =

Spanish footballer and manager

Personal information
- Full name: Ignacio Martín-Esperanza Tejada
- Date of birth: 5 June 1936 (age 90)
- Place of birth: Verín, Spain
- Height: 1.79 m (5 ft 10 1/2 in)
- Position: Forward

Youth career
- Real Madrid

Senior career*
Years	Team	Apps	(Gls)
1956–1960	Plus Ultra	43	(13)
1956–1957	→ La Felguera (loan)	40	(12)
1958–1959	→ Atlético Ceuta (loan)	22	(5)
1960–1963	Betis	42	(5)
1963–1970	Pontevedra	155	(19)
Total		302	(54)

Managerial career
- 1973: Pontevedra
- 1973–1974: Atlético Pontevedrés
- 1974–1975: Lugo
- 1975–1976: Portonovo
- 1976–1978: Algeciras
- 1978–1980: Lleida
- 1981: Figueres
- 1982–1983: Lugo
- 1983–1985: Hospitalet
- 1987–1990: Atlético Baleares
- 1999: Pontevedra
- * Club domestic league appearances and goals

Ignacio Martín-Esperanza Tejada (born 5 June 1936), known as Martín Esperanza, is a Spanish retired footballer who played as a forward, and is a former manager.

== Playing career ==
Born in Verín, Ourense, Galicia, Martín Esperanza finished his formation at Real Madrid, and made his senior debuts while on loan at CP La Felguera in 1956. He scored 12 goals for the club, which narrowly avoided relegation, and was assigned to the former's reserves in the following year.

Martín Esperanza was also loaned to CA Ceuta, and in 1960 signed for La Liga's Real Betis, with Luis del Sol moving in the opposite direction. He made his debut in the competition on 11 September, playing the full 90 minutes in a 2–0 home win against RCD Mallorca, and scored his first goal on 11 December, netting the last in a 2–1 success at Granada CF.

Martín-Esperanza struggled with injuries during his spell with the Andalusians, and joined Pontevedra CF in the 1963 summer. He was regularly used by the club, and eventually retired in 1970 at the age of 33; he was also called up to the national team in December 1965, being only an unused substitute in a 0–2 loss against England.

== Managerial career ==
After his retirement Martín Esperanza was appointed manager of his last side Pontevedra in 1973, and eventually suffering team relegation. After managing lower clubs in his native region he was named Algeciras CF manager, taking the club back to Segunda División B in his first season.

Subsequently, Martín Esperanza had spells with Catalan clubs UE Lleida, UE Figueres, CE L'Hospitalet and CD Atlético Baleares, all of them in the third division. In 1999, after nearly ten years without a club, he returned to Pontevedra, but his reign only lasted six matches.
