= Daniel Silvani =

Argentine footballer (born 1986)

Personal information
- Full name: Daniel Mariano Silvani Limia
- Date of birth: 1 March 1986 (age 40)
- Place of birth: Bernal, Argentina
- Height: 1.92 m (6 ft 4 in)
- Position: Centre-back

Team information
- Current team: Argentino de Quilmes

Youth career
- Independiente
- Arsenal de Sarandí

Senior career*
Years	Team	Apps	(Gls)
2006–2008	Dock Sud	48	(2)
2009	Atlético Ciudad		
2009	Ciempozuelos		
2010	Terrassa	12	(1)
2010–2011	Antequera	20	(3)
2011–2012	Logroñés		
2012	Tauste	15	(3)
2012–2013	Calahorra		
2013–2014	Central Córdoba	28	(2)
2014–2015	Excursionistas	26	(4)
2015–2020	Deportivo Riestra	126	(7)
2021	Acassuso CF	24	(1)
2022–	Argentino de Quilmes	9	(0)
- * Club domestic league appearances and goals as of 20:33, 13 May 2022 (UTC)

Daniel Mariano Silvani Limia (born 1 March 1986) is an Argentine professional footballer who plays as a centre-back for Argentino de Quilmes.

== Career ==
Silvani spent time in the youth ranks of Independiente and Arsenal de Sarandí. His senior career started with Dock Sud. He scored one goal in forty-six appearances in Primera C Metropolitana, with the 2007–08 campaign concluding with relegation to Primera D Metropolitana. He appeared twice and scored once in tier five, prior to switching Argentina for Spain in 2009 after agreeing terms with Segunda División B's Atlético Ciudad. Silvani soon signed for Tercera División side Ciempozuelos later that year. He remained for the rest of 2008–09, though left before the 2009–10 season started. Silvani signed for Terrassa in 2010.

Silvani scored on his debut for Terrassa in February 2010 versus Gramenet, before receiving a red card in his next game against Espanyol B. Silvani featured twelve times as they were relegated. He spent the 2010–11 season back in the Tercera División with Antequera, with the defender netting in fixtures with Adra, El Palo and Alhaurino. Silvani had further stints in Spanish football with Logroñés, Tauste and Calahorra, prior to returning to his homeland with Central Córdoba in mid-2013. Fellow Primera C Metropolitana team Excursionistas signed Silvani on 30 June 2014. Two seasons passed along with four goals in twenty-six matches.

June 2015 saw Silvani join Deportivo Riestra in Primera B Metropolitana. He made the first of fifty-four appearances in July versus Defensores de Belgrano, which culminated with promotion in 2016–17.

== Personal life ==
Silvani's brother, Gastón, is a footballer. He also played for Dock Sud, Central Córdoba, Excursionistas.

== Career statistics ==
As of 3 June 2019.

Appearances and goals by club, season and competition
Club	Season	League			Cup		League Cup		Continental		Other		Total	
Club	Season	Division	Apps	Goals	Apps	Goals	Apps	Goals	Apps	Goals	Apps	Goals	Apps	Goals
Dock Sud	2006–07	Primera C Metropolitana	8	0	0	0	—		—		0	0	8	0
Dock Sud	2007–08	Primera C Metropolitana	38	1	0	0	—		—		0	0	38	1
Dock Sud	2008–09	Primera D Metropolitana	2	1	0	0	—		—		0	0	2	1
Dock Sud	Total		48	2	0	0	—		—		0	0	48	2
Terrassa	2009–10	Segunda División B	12	1	0	0	—		—		0	0	12	1
Antequera	2010–11	Tercera División	20	3	0	0	—		—		0	0	20	3
Tauste	2011–12	Tercera División	15	3	0	0	—		—		0	0	15	3
Central Córdoba	2013–14	Primera C Metropolitana	28	2	1	0	—		—		0	0	29	2
Excursionistas	2014	Primera C Metropolitana	18	3	0	0	—		—		0	0	18	3
Excursionistas	2015	Primera C Metropolitana	8	1	0	0	—		—		0	0	8	1
Excursionistas	Total		26	4	0	0	—		—		0	0	26	4
Deportivo Riestra	2015	Primera B Metropolitana	17	2	0	0	—		—		0	0	17	2
Deportivo Riestra	2016	Primera B Metropolitana	6	0	0	0	—		—		0	0	6	0
Deportivo Riestra	2016–17	Primera B Metropolitana	26	1	1	0	—		—		5 (Note: Appearance(s) in the Primera B Metropolitana play-offs)	0	32	1
Deportivo Riestra	2017–18	Primera B Nacional	21	1	1	0	—		—		0	0	22	1
Deportivo Riestra	2018–19	Primera B Metropolitana	36	1	1	0	—		—		0	0	37	1
Deportivo Riestra	Total		106	5	3	0	—		—		5	0	114	5
Career total			255	20	4	0	—		—		5	0	264	20
