= Ricardo Alós =

Spanish footballer (1931–2024)

Personal information
- Full name: Ricardo Alós Bailach
- Date of birth: 11 October 1931
- Place of birth: Moncada, Spain
- Date of death: 14 January 2024 (aged 92)
- Position: Forward

Senior career*
Years	Team	Apps	(Gls)
1952–1956	Valencia Mestalla	59	(20)
1956–1957	Sporting Gijón	34	(46)
1957–1960	Valencia	41	(24)
1960–1963	Real Murcia	16	(3)
1963–1964	Ontinyent	10	(0)
Total		160	(93)

International career
1958	Spain B	1	(0)
- * Club domestic league appearances and goals

Ricardo Alós Bailach (11 October 1931 – 14 January 2024), sometimes known as just Ricardo, was a Spanish professional footballer who played as a forward. A prolific goalscorer, he is best known for winning the 1957–58 Pichichi Trophy in a three-way tie.

== Club career ==
Alós began his senior career in 1952 with the reserves of his local side, Valencia Mestalla. In the 1956-57 season, he moved to Sporting Gijón in the Segunda División and scored 46 goals in the season winning the Pichichi Segunda División, and setting the all-time record for goals scored in a season in that division.

His strong season with Sporting Gijón earned him a move to the senior Valencia side in La Liga, and in his debut season he scored 19 goals; he earned the Pichichi Trophy that season, in a three-way tie with Alfredo Di Stéfano of Real Madrid and Manuel Badenes of Valladolid.

After Valencia, he moved to Real Murcia in 1960 in the Segunda División where he played inconsistently, although they won the 1962–63 Segunda División. He played his final year with Ontinyent, retiring in 1964.

== International career ==
Alós played one match for the Spain B national team in 1958, in the 1953–58 Mediterranean Cup.

== Death ==
Alós died on 14 January 2024, at the age of 92.

== Honours ==
Valencia Mestalla

- Segunda División: 1956–57

Real Murcia

- Segunda División: 1962–63

Individual

- Pichichi Segunda División: 1956–1957
- Pichichi Trophy: 1957–58
