= Nacho López (footballer) =

Spanish footballer

Personal information
- Full name: Ignacio López Iglesias
- Date of birth: 24 October 1987 (age 39)
- Place of birth: Oviedo, Spain
- Height: 1.76 m (5 ft 9 in)
- Positions: Right back; midfielder

Team information
- Current team: Langreo
- Number: 24

Youth career
- Oviedo

Senior career*
Years	Team	Apps	(Gls)
2006–2009	Oviedo	15	(0)
2006–2007	→ Lealtad (loan)	25	(2)
2007–2008	→ Langreo (loan)	28	(3)
2008	Oviedo B	1	(0)
2009–2013	Caudal	127	(2)
2013–2014	Avilés	29	(0)
2014–2016	Oviedo	39	(0)
2016–2017	Ponferradina	21	(0)
2017–2018	Lealtad	20	(1)
2018–2020	Pontevedra	60	(1)
2020–2021	Salamanca	15	(1)
2021–2023	Real Avilés	37	(0)
2023–	Langreo	73	(0)
- * Club domestic league appearances and goals as of 14 May 2026

Ignacio 'Nacho' López Iglesias (born 24 October 1987) is a Spanish professional footballer who plays for Langreo. Mainly a right back, he can also play as a midfielder.

== Club career ==
Born in Oviedo, Asturias, López was a Real Oviedo youth graduate. He made his senior debut for the club on 28 May 2006, coming on as a second-half substitute in a 1–1 away draw against Real Unión in the Segunda División B.

After loan stints at CD Lealtad and UP Langreo, López returned to Oviedo. Initially assigned to the reserves, he appeared mainly with the main squad in the Tercera División.

In the 2009 summer López moved to fellow league team Caudal Deportivo. After four full seasons with the side, playing in both third and fourth levels, he signed for Real Avilés.

On 10 July 2014 López joined Oviedo for a third time. He was a regular starter for the side during the campaign, appearing in 32 matches as the Carbayones returned to the Segunda División after a 12-year absence.

On 9 September 2015 López made his professional debut, starting in a 2–1 home win against Real Valladolid, in the season's Copa del Rey.
