= José Manuel Sertucha =

Spanish footballer (1942–2004)

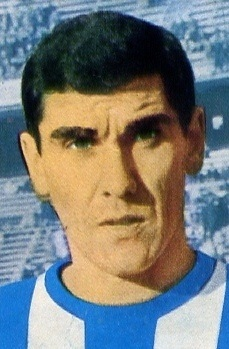
- Sertucha with Deportivo La Coruña

Personal information
- Full name: José Manuel Sertucha Ereñozaga
- Date of birth: 1 November 1942
- Place of birth: Gatica, Basque Country, Spain
- Date of death: 21 January 2014 (aged 71)
- Place of death: La Coruña, Galicia, Spain
- Position: Defender

Senior career*
Years	Team	Apps	(Gls)
1961–1962	Osasuna		
1962–1963	Alavés		
1963–1966	Osasuna		
1966–1971	La Coruña		
1971–1972	Xerez		
- * Club domestic league appearances and goals

José Manuel Sertucha Ereñozaga (1 November 1942 – 21 January 2014) was a Spanish footballer. Nicknamed "El Vasco" and sometimes known simply as Sertucha, he played as a defender primarily for La Coruña throughout the mid-1960s to the early 1970s.

== Club career ==
Sertucha would make his debut as a footballer for Osasuna for the 1961–62 La Liga. He would later play for Deportivo Alavés in the 1962–63 Segunda División following the lack of matches he would have. He would enjoy more participation with Alavés, playing in 26 matches before returning to Osasuna where the club had since been relegated to the second tier of Spanish football. He then began his career with La Coruña for the 1966–67 La Liga where the club would be relegated to the Segunda División. Despite this though, he would later be part of the same team where the club would become champions of the 1967–68 Segunda División and be promoted back to play for the 1968–69 La Liga where the club would be relegated once again in the 1969-70 season. His final season for the club would be in the 1970–71 Segunda División as he would play his final season with Xerez for the 1971–72 Segunda División where the club would be relegated to the 1972–73 Tercera División. He would ultimately play in 179 matches in total.

He would briefly return to La Coruña as a youth coach and after becoming second-in-command for the club for the 1978–79 season, he would ultimately retire from any football career.

Following his retirement, he would remain in the city of La Coruña for the rest of his life, opening up a store where he sold sports merchandise until his death on 21 January 2014.
