= UP Langreo =

Langreo
- Full name: Unión Popular de Langreo
- Nicknames: Unionistas; Azulgranas
- Short name: UPL
- Founded: 4 July 1961; 65 years ago
- Stadium: Ganzábal
- Capacity: 4,024
- President: Adrián Torre
- Head coach: Manel Menéndez
- League: Tercera Federación – Group 2
- 2025–26: Segunda Federación – Group 1, 14th of 18 (relegated)
- Website: http://www.uplangreo.es
Home colours	Away colours

Unión Popular de Langreo is a Spanish football team based in Langreo, in the autonomous community of Asturias. Founded in 1961, it plays in Tercera Federación – Group 2, holding its home games at Estadio Ganzábal in La Felguera, with a capacity of 4,024 seats.

== History ==
UP Langreo was founded on 4 July 1961, after the merge of local teams CP La Felguera and Racing de Sama, which had a fierce rivalry. The merge was made with the aim of overcoming from the rivalry between Sama and La Felguera not only in football, but in all areas.

In its first season, Langreo achieved promotion to Segunda División, where it played during eight seasons out of the next ten years. Since its second relegation from Segunda to Tercera División, the club always played between Tercera and Segunda División B, the new third tier created in 1977, where UP Langreo played for the first time in its inaugural season.

In 1994, Langreo played the promotion playoffs to Segunda División, but it finished in the last position of its group, composed also by CF Extremadura, AEC Manlleu and CD Numancia.

Since that year, Langreo continues playing alternatively between Segunda División B and Tercera División. In the 2017–18 season the club promoted back to Segunda División B after spending three seasons in Tercera and qualified for the Copa del Rey thus ending with an 18-year absence in the competition, the largest in the club's history.

== Stadium ==
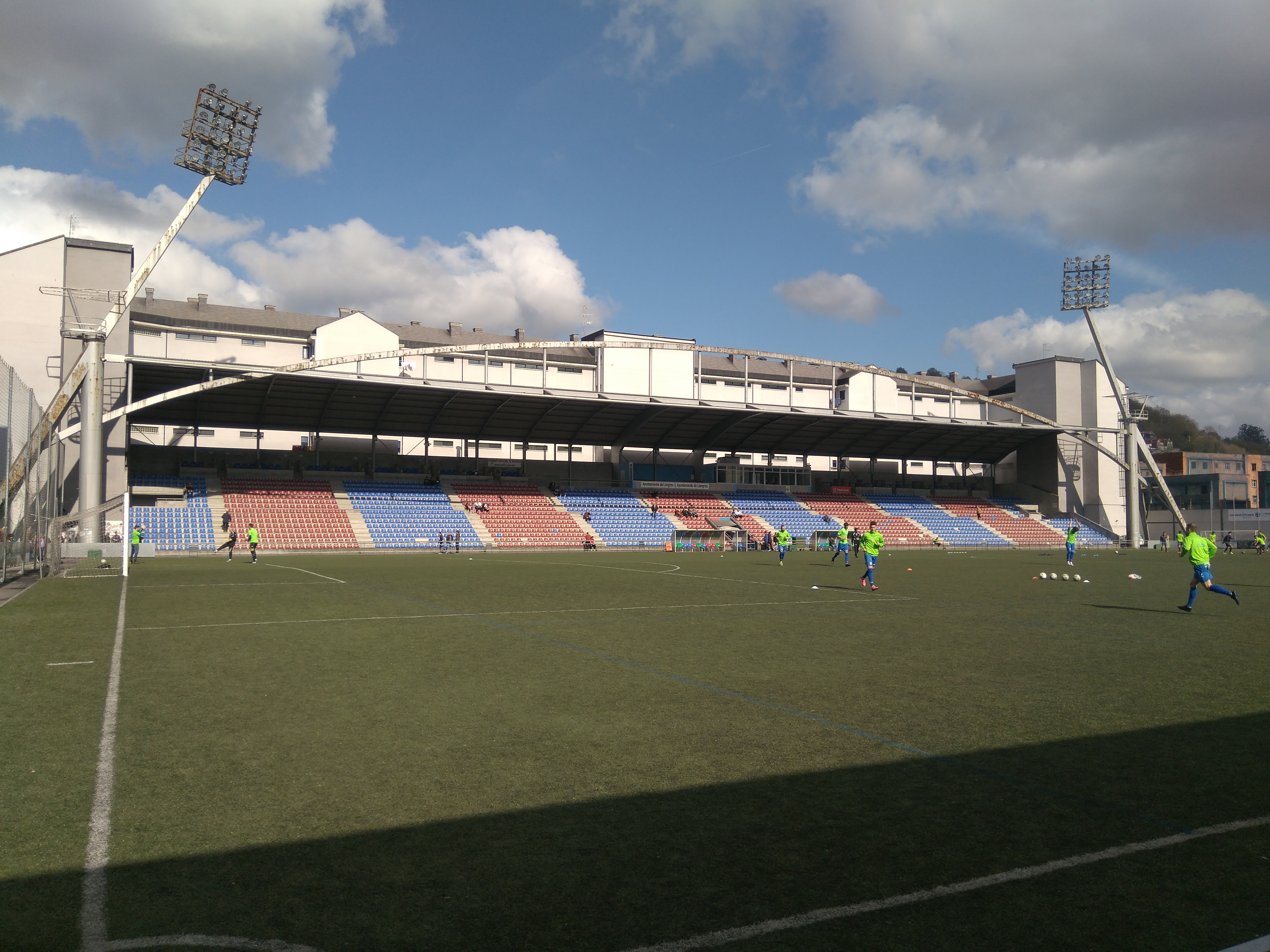
Main tribune of Estadio Ganzábal.

Since its foundation, Langreo plays in Estadio Ganzábal. Entirely renovated in 2006, it has capacity for 4,024 spectators.

== Rivalries ==
Langreo's historic rival is Caudal Deportivo. Both teams meet in the Asturian Mining basins derby. The club also has a strong rivalry with Real Avilés.

== Season to season ==
Season	Tier	Division	Place	Copa del Rey
1961–62	3	3ª	1st	
1962–63	2	2ª	13th	First round
1963–64	2	2ª	11th	Round of 32
1964–65	2	2ª	12th	First round
1965–66	2	2ª	13th	Round of 32
1966–67	2	2ª	13th	First round
1967–68	2	2ª	10th	Round of 32
1968–69	3	3ª	2nd	
1969–70	3	3ª	1st	Second round
1970–71	2	2ª	17th	Round of 32
1971–72	2	2ª	20th	Fourth round
1972–73	3	3ª	8th	Third round
1973–74	3	3ª	2nd	Fourth round
1974–75	3	3ª	10th	First round
1975–76	3	3ª	11th	Second round
1976–77	3	3ª	7th	First round
1977–78	3	2ª B	8th	Second round
1978–79	3	2ª B	14th	First round
1979–80	3	2ª B	5th	Third round
1980–81	3	2ª B	19th	Second round

Season	Tier	Division	Place	Copa del Rey
1981–82	4	3ª	1st	
1982–83	4	3ª	2nd	Second round
1983–84	4	3ª	3rd	First round
1984–85	4	3ª	4th	First round
1985–86	4	3ª	1st	Second round
1986–87	4	3ª	3rd	Round of 16
1987–88	3	2ª B	13th	First round
1988–89	3	2ª B	11th	Second round
1989–90	3	2ª B	12th	
1990–91	3	2ª B	18th	First round
1991–92	4	3ª	3rd	Third round
1992–93	4	3ª	3rd	First round
1993–94	3	2ª B	4th	Third round
1994–95	3	2ª B	8th	Second round
1995–96	3	2ª B	10th	
1996–97	3	2ª B	14th	
1997–98	3	2ª B	11th	
1998–99	3	2ª B	18th	
1999–2000	4	3ª	5th	
2000–01	4	3ª	3rd	

Season	Tier	Division	Place	Copa del Rey
2001–02	4	3ª	1st	
2002–03	3	2ª B	16th	Preliminary
2003–04	4	3ª	5th	
2004–05	4	3ª	4th	
2005–06	4	3ª	2nd	
2006–07	4	3ª	3rd	
2007–08	4	3ª	3rd	
2008–09	4	3ª	5th	
2009–10	4	3ª	5th	
2010–11	4	3ª	3rd	
2011–12	4	3ª	3rd	
2012–13	4	3ª	4th	
2013–14	4	3ª	2nd	
2014–15	3	2ª B	17th	
2015–16	4	3ª	2nd	
2016–17	4	3ª	3rd	
2017–18	4	3ª	2nd	
2018–19	3	2ª B	9th	First round
2019–20	3	2ª B	10th	First round
2020–21	3	2ª B	5th / 4th	

Season	Tier	Division	Place	Copa del Rey
2021–22	4	2ª RFEF	11th	
2022–23	4	2ª Fed.	12th	
2023–24	4	2ª Fed.	6th	
2024–25	4	2ª Fed.	6th	First round
2025–26	4	2ª Fed.	14th	First round
2026–27	5	3ª Fed.		

- 8 seasons in Segunda División
- 19 seasons in Segunda División B
- 5 seasons in Segunda Federación/Segunda División RFEF
- 33 seasons in Tercera División
- 1 season in Tercera Federación

== Current squad ==
As of 6 February 2026

Note: Flags indicate national team as defined under FIFA eligibility rules; some limited exceptions apply. Players may hold more than one non-FIFA nationality.

No.	Pos.	Nation	Player
1	GK	ESP	Adrián Torre
2	DF	ESP	Óscar Maza
3	DF	ESP	Álex Menéndez
4	DF	ESP	Liam López
5	DF	ESP	David Ámez
6	MF	ESP	Lucas Suárez
7	FW	ESP	Diego Díaz
8	MF	ESP	Sergio Orviz
9	FW	ESP	Sergio Neira
10	MF	ESP	Juan López
11	FW	ESP	Omar Álvarez

No.	Pos.	Nation	Player
14	MF	ESP	Alex René Reyes
15	DF	ESP	Dani Ojeda
17	MF	GEQ	Basilio Rieno
18	MF	MEX	Diego Benavente
21	MF	ESP	Iván González
22	MF	ESP	Pablo Pérez
24	DF	ESP	Nacho López
26	DF	ESP	Enol Rodriguez
31	GK	ESP	Illán Blanco
32	MF	ESP	Borja Vicente

=== Out on loan ===
Note: Flags indicate national team as defined under FIFA eligibility rules; some limited exceptions apply. Players may hold more than one non-FIFA nationality.

No.	Pos.	Nation	Player
—	MF	DOM	Bryan Reyes (at SD Lenense until 30 June 2026)

== Honours ==
- Tercera División: 1961–62, 1969–70, 1981–82, 1985–86, 2001–02
- Copa RFEF (Asturias tournament): 1997, 2008, 2017

== Notable players ==
- (Equatorial Guinea) Kily
- (Spain) Juan Carlos Álvarez
- (Spain) Michu
- (Spain) David Villa (youth)

== Presidents ==
- José Antonio Coto (1961–71)
- Alfredo Fombella (1971)
- Guillermo Menéndez Coto (1971–75)
- José María Fernández (1975–77)
- Enrique López Clavería (1977–80)
- Guillermo Menéndez Coto (2) (1980)
- Honorino Montes (1980–85)
- Julio Cadenas (1985–89)
- Amador Cañón (1989–90)
- Alfonso Cienfuegos (1990–99)
- Manuel Mazzola (1999–2007)
- Adolfo Ceñera (2007–08)
- Fernando de la Roza (2008)
- Francisco Brito Arceo (2008–11)
- Senén Riera (2011–13)
- Ana Pacho (2013–14)
- Víctor Fernández-Miranda (2014–present)
