= Óscar Montalvo =

Peruvian footballer (1937–2006)

Personal information
- Full name: Óscar Montalvo Finetti
- Date of birth: 20 March 1937
- Place of birth: Pimentel District, Peru
- Date of death: November 2006 (aged 69)
- Position: Midfielder

Senior career*
Years	Team	Apps	(Gls)
- Deportivo Municipal
- Ciclista Lima
1962–1967	Deportivo de La Coruña	107	(30)
1967–1968	Real Oviedo	25	(6)

International career
1959–1962	Peru	7	(0)

Managerial career
- 1988: Sporting Cristal
- * Club domestic league appearances and goals

Óscar Montalvo Finetti (20 March 1937 – November 2006) was a Peruvian football player, who played as a midfielder or as a winger. He died in November 2006, at the age of 69.

== Career ==
Montalvo spent much of his career with Deportivo Municipal. He was one of the Deportivo players who participated together with a group of players from Sport Boys in the so-called Tour of Four Continents in 1960. He also played for Ciclista Lima.

In 1962, Montalvo was signed by the Spanish club Deportivo de La Coruña, for whom he played between 1962 and 1967. He them moved to Real Oviedo for a season until his retirement in 1968.

Montalvo made 7 appearances for the Peru national football team from 1959 to 1962. He was a member of the team which defeated England 4–1 in 1959, considered one of the best Peruvian performances ever, and played for Peru in the 1959 South American Championship in Argentina. In his final international match, another friendly against England, he had a penalty saved by English goalkeeper Ron Springett. Because of the policy of the Peruvian Football Federation of only selecting domestic players for the national team, Montalvo's move to Spain effectively ended his international career.

== Retirement ==
After retiring as a player he returned to Peru and worked as a youth coach. One of the most famous players he developed was Jefferson Farfán. In 1988, he briefly managed the Peruvian club Sporting Cristal.
