= CD Tauste =

Spanish football team

- Full name: Club Deportivo Tauste
- Founded: 1945
- Ground: Las Rozas, Tauste, Aragon, Spain
- Capacity: 5,000
- Chairman: Eugenia Azuara
- Coach: Fernando Royo
- League: Regional Preferente – Group 1
- 2025–26: Primera Regional – Group 3, 2nd of 18 (promoted)
| Home colours | Away colours |

Club Deportivo Tauste is a Spanish football team based in Tauste in the community of Aragon. Founded in 1945, it plays in Regional Preferente – Group 1.

== Colours ==
- Home colours: yellow and black striped shirt, black shorts and black socks.
- Away colours: red shirt, black shorts and red socks.

== Season to season ==
| Season | Tier | Division | Place | Copa del Rey |
|---|---|---|---|---|
| 1945–46 | 4 | 1ª Reg. | 1st | |
| 1946–47 | 3 | 3ª | 10th | |
| 1947–48 | 3 | 3ª | 12th | Second round |
| 1948–49 | 4 | 1ª Reg. | 6th | |
| 1949–1953 | DNP | | | |
| 1953–54 | 5 | 2ª Reg. | 1st | |
| 1954–55 | 4 | 1ª Reg. | 1st | |
| 1955–56 | 3 | 3ª | 7th | |
| 1956–57 | 3 | 3ª | 5th | |
| 1957–58 | 3 | 3ª | 7th | |
| 1958–59 | 3 | 3ª | 16th | |
| 1959–60 | 4 | 1ª Reg. | 4th | |
| 1960–1967 | DNP | | | |
| 1967–68 | 5 | 1ª Reg. | 2nd | |
| 1968–69 | 5 | 1ª Reg. | 1st | |
| 1969–70 | 4 | Reg. Pref. | 11th | |
| 1970–71 | 4 | Reg. Pref. | 7th | |
| 1971–72 | 4 | Reg. Pref. | 6th | |
| 1972–73 | 4 | Reg. Pref. | 8th | |
| 1973–74 | 4 | Reg. Pref. | 17th | |

| Season | Tier | Division | Place | Copa del Rey |
|---|---|---|---|---|
| 1974–75 | 5 | 1ª Reg. | 5th | |
| 1975–76 | 5 | 1ª Reg. | 7th | |
| 1976–77 | 5 | 1ª Reg. | 14th | |
| 1977–78 | 6 | 1ª Reg. | 2nd | |
| 1978–79 | 5 | Reg. Pref. | 16th | |
| 1979–80 | 5 | Reg. Pref. | 11th | |
| 1980–81 | 5 | Reg. Pref. | 1st | |
| 1981–82 | 4 | 3ª | 14th | |
| 1982–83 | 4 | 3ª | 20th | |
| 1983–84 | 5 | Reg. Pref. | 5th | |
| 1984–85 | 5 | Reg. Pref. | 18th | |
| 1985–86 | 6 | 1ª Reg. | 6th | |
| 1986–87 | 5 | Reg. Pref. | 9th | |
| 1987–88 | 5 | Reg. Pref. | 1st | |
| 1988–89 | 4 | 3ª | 3rd | |
| 1989–90 | 4 | 3ª | 10th | |
| 1990–91 | 4 | 3ª | 13th | |
| 1991–92 | 4 | 3ª | 17th | |
| 1992–93 | 5 | Reg. Pref. | 5th | |
| 1993–94 | 5 | Reg. Pref. | 9th | |

| Season | Tier | Division | Place | Copa del Rey |
|---|---|---|---|---|
| 1994–95 | 5 | Reg. Pref. | 11th | |
| 1995–96 | 5 | Reg. Pref. | 7th | |
| 1996–97 | 5 | Reg. Pref. | 16th | |
| 1997–98 | 6 | 1ª Reg. | 2nd | |
| 1998–99 | 5 | Reg. Pref. | 4th | |
| 1999–2000 | 5 | Reg. Pref. | 3rd | |
| 2000–01 | 5 | Reg. Pref. | 8th | |
| 2001–02 | 5 | Reg. Pref. | 15th | |
| 2002–03 | 6 | 1ª Reg. | 3rd | |
| 2003–04 | 6 | 1ª Reg. | 5th | |
| 2004–05 | 6 | 1ª Reg. | 8th | |
| 2005–06 | 6 | 1ª Reg. | 1st | |
| 2006–07 | 5 | Reg. Pref. | 11th | |
| 2007–08 | 5 | Reg. Pref. | 3rd | |
| 2008–09 | 5 | Reg. Pref. | 1st | |
| 2009–10 | 4 | 3ª | 14th | |
| 2010–11 | 4 | 3ª | 14th | |
| 2011–12 | 4 | 3ª | 17th | |
| 2012–13 | 5 | Reg. Pref. | 7th | |
| 2013–14 | 5 | Reg. Pref. | 6th | |

| Season | Tier | Division | Place | Copa del Rey |
|---|---|---|---|---|
| 2014–15 | 5 | Reg. Pref. | 13th | |
| 2015–16 | 5 | Reg. Pref. | 15th | |
| 2016–17 | 6 | 1ª Reg. | 4th | |
| 2017–18 | 6 | 1ª Reg. | 5th | |
| 2018–19 | 6 | 1ª Reg. | 4th | |
| 2019–20 | 6 | 1ª Reg. | 7th | |
| 2020–21 | 6 | 1ª Reg. | 1st | |
| 2021–22 | 6 | Reg. Pref. | 14th | |
| 2022–23 | 7 | 1ª Reg. | 5th | |
| 2023–24 | 7 | 1ª Reg. | 3rd | |
| 2024–25 | 7 | 1ª Reg. | 5th | |
| 2025–26 | 7 | 1ª Reg. | 2nd | |

- 15 seasons in Tercera División
