= 1957–58 La Liga =

27th season of La Liga

Primera División
- Season: 1957–58
- Champions: Real Madrid (6th title)
- Relegated: Jaén; Valladolid
- European Cup: Real Madrid; Atlético Madrid (as Real Madrid qualified as title holders)
- Inter-Cities Fairs Cup: Barcelona
- Matches: 240
- Goals: 792 (3.3 per match)
- Top goalscorer: Ricardo Alós; Alfredo Di Stéfano; Manuel Badenes (19 goals each)
- Biggest home win: Atlético Madrid 9–0 Las Palmas
- Biggest away win: Las Palmas 0–7 Barcelona
- Highest scoring: Valladolid 7–3 Gijón

The 1957–58 La Liga season was the 27th since its establishment. The season began on 15 September 1957, and concluded on 4 May 1958. Real Madrid won their sixth title.

== Team locations ==
Location of teams in La Liga 1957–58
Location of teams in 1956–57 La Liga (Canary Islands)

Zaragoza moved from its old stadium Torrero to the new La Romareda. Barcelona also moved from Las Corts to the Nou Camp, which became the biggest stadium in Spain.

Team	Home city	Stadium
Atlético Bilbao	Bilbao	San Mamés
Atlético Madrid	Madrid	Metropolitano
Barcelona	Barcelona	Nou Camp
Celta	Vigo	Balaídos
Español	Barcelona	Sarriá
Granada	Granada	Los Cármenes
Jaén	Jaén	La Victoria
Las Palmas	Las Palmas	Insular
Osasuna	Pamplona	San Juan
Real Gijón	Gijón	El Molinón
Real Madrid	Madrid	Santiago Bernabéu
Real Sociedad	San Sebastián	Atocha
Sevilla	Seville	Nervión
Valencia	Valencia	Mestalla
Valladolid	Valladolid	Municipal
Zaragoza	Zaragoza	La Romareda

== League table ==
Pos	Team	Pld	W	D	L	GF	GA	GD	Pts	Qualification or relegation
1	Real Madrid (C)	30	20	5	5	71	26	+45	45	Qualification for the European Cup first round
2	Atlético Madrid	30	16	10	4	78	43	+35	42	Qualification for the European Cup preliminary round (Note: Atlético Madrid qualified for the European Cup as Real Madrid qualified as title holders.)
3	Barcelona	30	17	4	9	69	38	+31	38	Invited for the Inter-Cities Fairs Cup
4	Valencia	30	13	10	7	56	40	+16	36	
5	Osasuna	30	15	5	10	53	43	+10	35	
6	Atlético Bilbao	30	14	4	12	56	48	+8	32	
7	Celta	30	13	6	11	50	51	−1	32	
8	Español	30	11	6	13	48	46	+2	28	
9	Real Sociedad	30	10	7	13	38	44	−6	27	
10	Sevilla	30	9	7	14	45	55	−10	25	
11	Las Palmas	30	9	7	14	34	65	−31	25	
12	Real Gijón	30	10	4	16	46	57	−11	24	
13	Granada	30	11	2	17	35	53	−18	24	
14	Zaragoza	30	8	8	14	39	52	−13	24	
15	Valladolid (R)	30	9	5	16	45	73	−28	23	Relegation to the Segunda División
16	Jaén (R)	30	9	2	19	29	58	−29	20	Relegation to the Segunda División

Source: BDFútbol
Rules for classification: 1) Points; 2) Head-to-head results; 3) Goal difference; 4) Number of goals scored
(C) Champions; (R) Relegated

== Results ==
Home \ Away	ATB	ATM	BAR	CEL	ESP	GRA	JAE	LPA	OSA	GIJ	RMA	RSO	SEV	VAL	VAD	ZAR
Atlético Bilbao	—	1–2	4–1	6–0	3–2	1–0	5–1	1–1	2–0	2–1	0–2	2–2	5–2	3–2	1–0	4–1
Atlético Madrid	3–2	—	3–1	2–1	2–3	5–1	4–1	9–0	4–1	3–2	1–1	2–0	1–1	2–2	7–0	4–2
Barcelona	3–0	2–2	—	1–0	3–1	4–1	6–1	2–0	3–0	3–0	0–2	1–0	3–1	1–1	7–1	5–1
Celta	0–1	2–2	4–0	—	3–2	0–2	2–1	2–2	2–0	1–2	2–1	1–0	3–1	3–2	3–1	2–1
Español	1–0	4–1	2–1	1–1	—	2–1	2–0	3–0	2–0	5–1	2–4	2–2	2–3	0–0	1–1	1–0
Granada	1–3	2–2	0–4	1–0	1–0	—	2–0	4–0	1–2	1–0	0–2	3–1	2–1	1–0	4–0	1–0
Jaén	3–2	0–1	1–0	4–1	4–2	2–0	—	1–1	0–2	2–1	0–2	0–1	1–0	1–0	0–2	3–0
Las Palmas	2–2	3–0	0–7	1–6	1–0	1–0	2–1	—	2–1	0–0	0–0	2–1	4–1	5–3	3–1	0–0
Osasuna	2–2	1–1	2–1	5–1	3–2	1–0	5–1	2–0	—	2–1	1–0	3–0	3–2	2–2	5–0	1–1
Real Gijón	0–2	2–4	3–2	1–2	2–0	5–1	1–0	1–0	2–3	—	3–0	3–0	1–1	1–3	0–2	4–1
Real Madrid	6–0	0–0	3–0	5–0	2–0	4–0	3–0	2–1	3–0	4–0	—	2–1	6–0	2–1	5–3	2–1
Real Sociedad	1–0	2–4	1–2	1–1	2–1	4–1	2–0	3–1	2–1	3–2	2–2	—	2–0	0–0	0–0	1–1
Sevilla	3–1	2–2	1–2	2–0	0–1	2–0	0–0	4–1	1–1	1–2	3–2	3–0	—	0–1	4–2	1–0
Valencia	1–0	2–0	1–1	1–1	2–1	3–1	4–0	4–1	3–0	2–2	2–2	1–0	2–2	—	3–0	3–1
Valladolid	3–0	2–2	1–2	0–4	2–2	1–1	3–1	2–0	0–4	7–3	0–1	2–1	2–0	6–3	—	1–3
Zaragoza	2–1	0–3	1–1	2–2	1–1	3–2	2–0	2–0	2–0	0–0	3–1	1–3	3–3	1–2	3–0	—

Source: BDFútbol
Legend: Blue = home team win; Yellow = draw; Red = away team win.

== Pichichi Trophy ==
Rank	Player	Club	Goals
1	(Spain) Alfredo Di Stéfano	Real Madrid	19
1	(Spain) Manuel Badenes	Valladolid	19
1	(Spain) Ricardo Alós	Valencia	19
4	(Spain) Héctor Rial	Real Madrid	17
4	(Spain) Joaquín Peiró	Atlético Madrid	17
