= Padura =

Padura is a surname. Notable people with the surname include:

- Leonardo Padura Fuentes (born 1955), Cuban novelist and journalist
- Tymko Padura (1801–1871), Ukrainian-Polish poet, musician, and composer-songwriter
