= CP La Felguera =

Spanish football club

Círculo Popular
- Full name: Círculo Popular de La Felguera
- Founded: 1917
- Dissolved: 1961
- Ground: La Barraca, La Felguera, Asturias, Spain
- Capacity: 5,000
Home colours

Círculo Popular de La Felguera was a Spanish football club based in La Felguera, Asturias. Founded in 1917, it held home matches at Estadio La Barraca, with a 5,000 (1,000-seat) capacity.

== History ==
The club was founded in 1916 with the name Sporting Club Felguerino. In the 1950s, was named La Felguera Siderúrgica C.P. In 1961 was founded UP Langreo by the merger between Círculo Popular and Racing de Sama.

== Seasons ==
Season	Tier	Division	Place	Copa del Rey
1929–1940	—	Regional	—	
1939–40	4	1ª Reg.	6th	
1940–41	4	1ª Reg.	4th	
1941–42	3	1ª Reg.	3rd	
1942–43	3	1ª Reg.	1st	
1943–44	3	3ª	9th	1st round
1944–45	3	3ª	6th	
1945–46	3	3ª	1st	
1946–47	3	3ª	7th	
1947–48	3	3ª	6th	4th round
1948–49	3	3ª	4th	2nd round
1949–50	3	3ª	8th	

Season	Tier	Division	Place	Copa del Rey
1950–51	3	3ª	6th	
1951–52	3	3ª	2nd	
1952–53	3	3ª	1st	
1953–54	2	2ª	13th	
1954–55	2	2ª	7th	
1955–56	2	2ª	13th	
1956–57	2	2ª	15th	
1957–58	2	2ª	18th	
1958–59	3	3ª	1st	
1959–60	3	3ª	2nd	
1960–61	3	3ª	1st	

- 5 seasons in Segunda División
- 13 seasons in Tercera División
