= Ignacio Bergara =

Uruguayan footballer and manager (1940-2004)

Personal information
- Full name: Ignacio Miguel Bergara de Medina
- Date of birth: 20 July 1940
- Place of birth: Montevideo, Uruguay
- Date of death: 4 January 2004 (aged 63)
- Place of death: Ibiza, Spain
- Position: Defender

Senior career*
Years	Team	Apps	(Gls)
1962–1963	Racing de Montevideo		
1963–1964	Mallorca	15	(0)
1964–1969	Espanyol	51	(7)
1969–1970	San Andrés		

Managerial career
- 1974: San Andrés
- 1977–1978: San Andrés
- Binéfar
- 1981–1984: Albacete
- * Club domestic league appearances and goals

Ignacio Miguel "Nacho" Bergara de Medina (20 July 1940 – 4 January 2004) was a professional football player and manager.

== Career ==
Bergara was born in Montevideo and began his playing career with local side Racing Club de Montevideo. Ignacio and his brother Danny were two of three Uruguayan players signed by Spanish first division side RCD Mallorca in August 1962. He would join RCD Espanyol in August 1964, playing several more seasons in the Spanish first division with the club. He also played for C.D. San Andrés in the Spanish third division.

Following his playing career, Bergara became a football manager. He managed C.D. San Andrés twice before leading Albacete Balompié from 1981 to 1984, helping the club promote to the Spanish third division during his tenure.

== Personal ==
Bergara died in Ibiza, Spain on 4 January 2004. His brother, Danny, was also a professional football player and manager.
