= Estadio Ganzábal =

Football stadium in La Felguera, Spain

Ganzábal
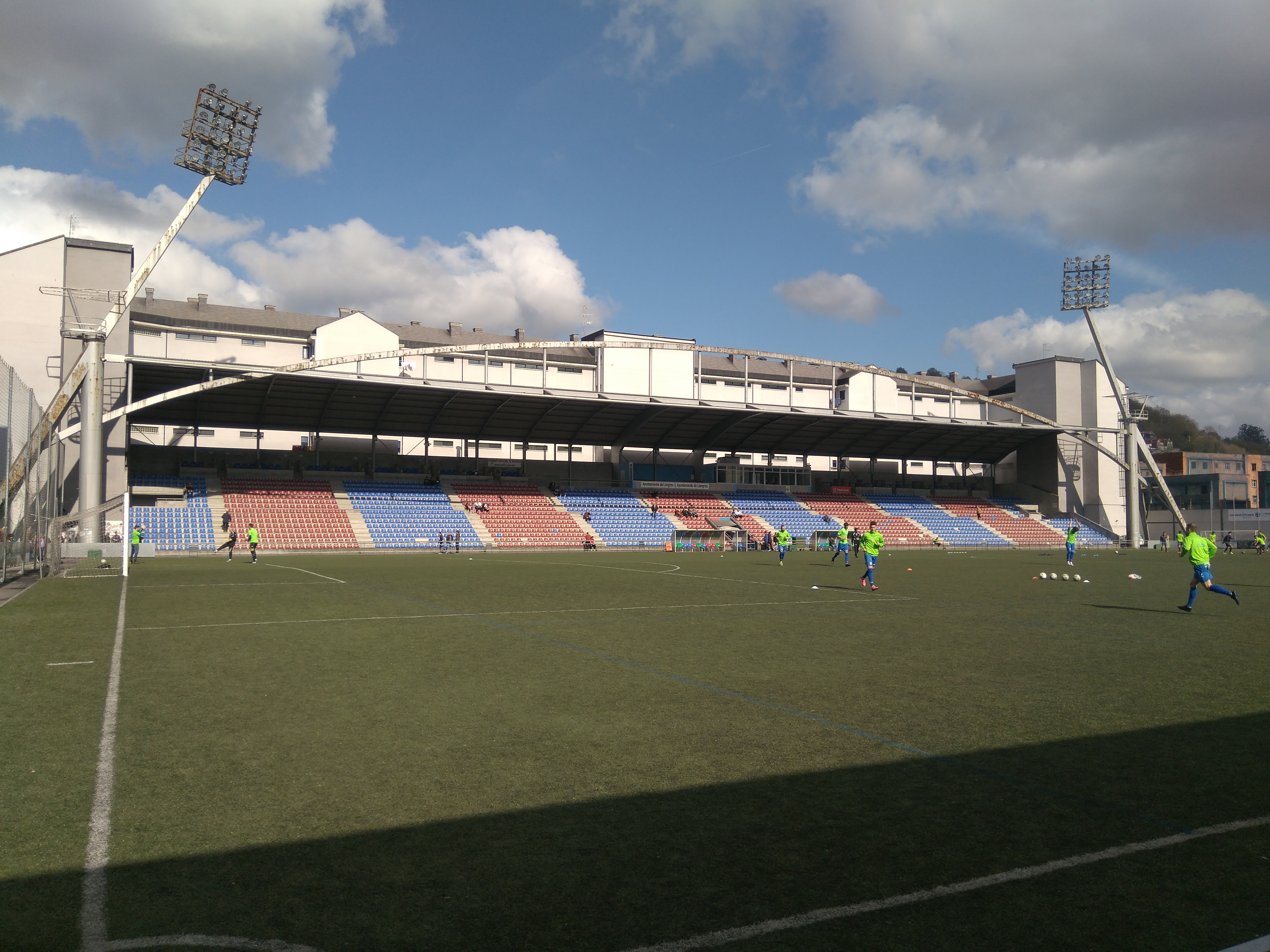
- Interactive map of Ganzábal
- Former names: Estadio La Barraca (1922–1961)
- Location: La Felguera, Langreo, Asturias, Spain
- Coordinates: 43°18′7.10″N 5°41′23.43″W
- Owner: Municipality of Langreo
- Operator: UP Langreo
- Capacity: 4,024
- Surface: Artificial turf
- Record attendance: 4,084 (Langreo v Oviedo, 9 November 2014)
- Field size: 104 × 68

Construction
- Opened: 6 January 1922
- Renovated: 2006

Tenants
- CP La Felguera (1922–1961); UP Langreo (1961–present)

Estadio Ganzábal is a football stadium in La Felguera, Langreo, and is the home of UP Langreo.

== History ==
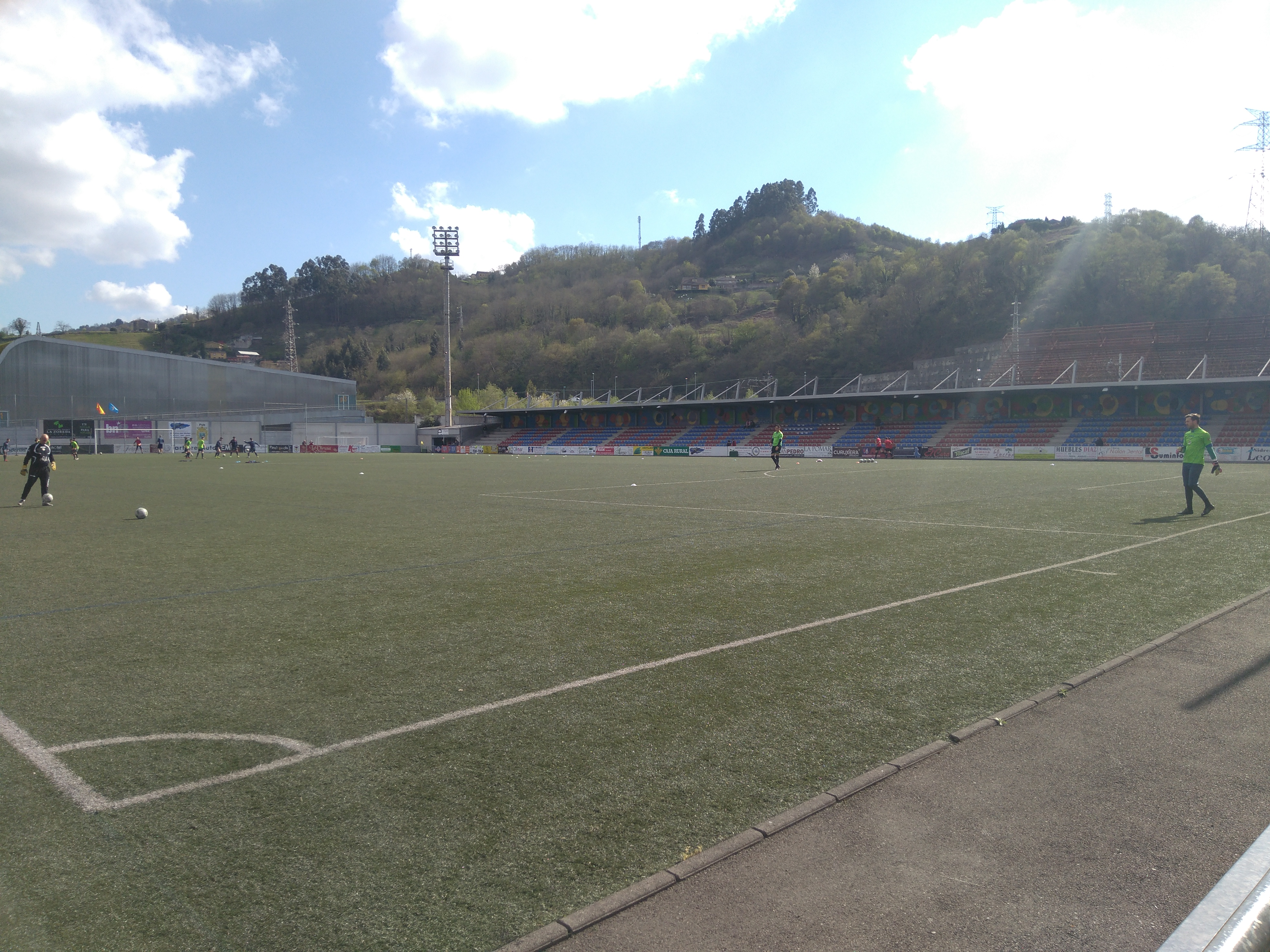
Southern tribune of Ganzábal.

The history of the stadium starts in the 1920s, when it was called as Estadio La Barraca, with CP La Felguera playing its home games at the stadium, before merging with Racing de Sama for creating the UP Langreo.

In 1961, year of the merge, the stadium was renamed as Estadio Ganzábal as homage to Francisco Fernández Ganzábal, local engineer and president of the club.

In 2006 the stadium was completely renovated. The under-19 teams of Spain and Turkey re-inaugurated the stadium with a friendly game on 20 September 2006. The first game of the local team in the new Ganzábal was played on 3 September 2006. Langreo defeated San Martín by 2–1.

== League attendances ==
This is a list of league and playoffs games attendances of UP Langreo at Ganzábal.

Season	Total	High	Low	Average
2008–09 Tercera División	10,298	2,168	200	542
2009–10 Tercera División	7,475	565	218	393
2010–11 Tercera División	9,263	1,668	280	463
2011–12 Tercera División	8,754	2,200	250	438
2012–13 Tercera División	8,800	1,500	150	404
2013–14 Tercera División	15,153	4,017	235	689
2014–15 Segunda División B	18,832	4,084	657	991
2015–16 Tercera División	17,059	3,525	410	812
2016–17 Tercera División	11,650	1,327	301	583
2017–18 Tercera División	16,740	3,872	400	761
2018–19 Segunda División B	15,643	2,847	514	823
2019–20 Segunda División B	10,750	1,410	488	827
