= Adolfo Bolea =

Spanish footballer (1933–2020)

Personal information
- Full name: Adolfo Bolea Sanz
- Date of birth: 24 March 1933
- Place of birth: El Poble-sec, Spain
- Date of death: 14 November 2020 (aged 87)
- Place of death: Cádiz, Spain
- Height: 1.64 m (5 ft 5 in)
- Position: Forward

Youth career
- Premià

Senior career*
| Years | Team | Apps | (Gls) |
| 1951–1953 | Sant Andreu | 56 | (21) |
| 1953–1955 | Español | 6 | (3) |
| 1953–1954 | → Tenerife (loan) | 27 | (14) |
| 1954–1955 | → Sabadell (loan) | 17 | (4) |
| 1955–1956 | España | 29 | (20) |
| 1956–1964 | Cádiz | 180 | (56) |
| 1964–1965 | Balón de Cádiz | | |
| Total | | 315 | (118) |

Managerial career
- 1964–1971: Balón de Cádiz
- 1971: Cádiz (assistant)
- 1971–1972: Cádiz
- 1974–1975: Cádiz B
- 1975: Portuense
- 1976: Cádiz
- 1977–1979: Portuense
- 1979–1980: Puerto Real
- 1980–1982: Cádiz B
- 1982–1983: San Fernando
- * Club domestic league appearances and goals

Adolfo Bolea Sanz (24 March 1933 – 14 November 2020) was a Spanish football forward and manager.

In a career spent mostly with Cádiz, he played 309 games and scored 115 goals in Segunda División, adding three in six in La Liga for Español. He also managed Cádiz in two brief spells.

== Playing career ==
Born in El Poble-sec, Barcelona, Catalonia, Bolea began his career at Sant Andreu in 1951–52, making his debut on 30 September 1951 in an 8–0 Segunda División loss at Racing Ferrol. In his fourth game, on 21 October, he scored his first goal, equalising for a 1–1 home draw against Osasuna. He finished the season with eight goals, hitting 13 in 29 appearances in the following campaign – including his first hat-trick, in a 4–1 home win over Caudal Deportivo – as the team ranked in eighth place and suffered administrative relegation.

Bolea was then sold to Español of La Liga, but loaned back down to Tenerife. He scored three times in a 6–1 victory against Melilla on 18 October 1953, and added four more on 20 December 1953 in an 8–0 undoing of Mallorca. He was then lent to Sabadell in summer 1954, before returning in November for his only experience outside the second tier; he netted three goals in six top-flight matches, including on 6 February 1955 when he struck twice in a 4–1 defeat of Hércules at the Sarrià Stadium.

At the end of the season, Bolea returned to the second division where he would remain until his professional retirement at the age of 31, signing for España of Tangier during the Spanish protectorate in Morocco. On 11 September 1955, in his very first appearance, he scored a hat-trick in a 4–2 win against Granada, and finished his first year with a career-best 20 goals from 29 games, but the club was merged into Algeciras when the city returned to Moroccan rule in 1956.

Bolea then crossed the Straits of Gibraltar and passed the final eight seasons of his career in the same league for Cádiz, leaving the Estadio Ramón de Carranza at the age of 31.

== Coaching career ==
Bolea was player-coach at amateurs Balón de Cádiz during the 1964–65 season, and remained as manager for a further six years. He returned to Cádiz in 1971 as assistant, and shortly afterwards served as interim.

In 1974, Bolea was appointed at the newly founded Cádiz B, achieving promotion to the first regional division. He signed with Portuense before the end of the campaign, and his role with the reserves was assumed by his assistant Luis Escarti.

Bolea returned to Cádiz as interim manager during the second part of 1975–76. Taking over at a critical time, he managed to avoid relegation from the second tier. However, he was affected by illness and was not appointed to the permanent position, which went to Escarti.

After two years with Cádiz's B side, Bolea's final position as manager was at San Fernando in the 1982–83 season.

== Death ==
Bolea died on 14 November 2020 at the age of 87, in Cádiz.
