= 1952–53 Segunda División =

22nd season of the second-tier football league in Spain

Segunda División
- Season: 1952–53
- Champions: Osasuna; Jaén
- Promoted: Osasuna; Jaén
- Relegated: San Andrés; Orihuela; Real Córdoba; Gimnástico; Atlético Baleares; Huesca; Plus Ultra; Burgos; Cacereño
- Matches: 480
- Goals: 1,693 (3.53 per match)
- Top goalscorer: Ángel Arregui (30 goals)
- Best goalkeeper: Primitivo Eroles; Goyo (1.11 goals/match)
- Biggest home win: Jaén 9–0 Granada (28 September 1952)
- Biggest away win: San Andrés 0–5 Lérida (28 September 1952)
- Highest scoring: Hércules 7–5 Orihuela (9 November 1952)

The 1952–53 Segunda División season was the 22nd since its establishment and was played between 13 September 1952 and 3 May 1953.

== Overview before the season ==
32 teams joined the league, including two relegated from the 1951–52 La Liga and 6 promoted from the 1951–52 Tercera División.

Relegated from La Liga

- Las Palmas
- Atlético Tetuán

Promoted from Tercera División

- Avilés
- Burgos
- España Industrial
- Cacereño
- Orihuela
- Jaén

== Group North ==
=== Teams ===
Location of teams in Segunda División 1952-53 Group North

Club	City	Stadium
Deportivo Alavés	Vitoria	Mendizorroza
Real Avilés CF	Avilés	Las Arobias
Club Baracaldo	Baracaldo	Lasesarre
Burgos CF	Burgos	Zatorre
Caudal Deportivo	Mieres	El Batán
SD España Industrial	Barcelona	Les Corts
Club Ferrol	Ferrol	Inferniño
RS Gimnástica de Torrelavega	Torrelavega	El Malecón
Gimnástico de Tarragona	Tarragona	Avenida de Cataluña
UD Huesca	Huesca	San Jorge
UD Lérida	Lérida	Campo de Deportes
CD Logroñés	Logroño	Las Gaunas
CA Osasuna	Pamplona	San Juan
CD Sabadell FC	Sabadell	Cruz Alta
UD Salamanca	Salamanca	El Calvario
CD San Andrés	Barcelona	Santa Coloma

=== League table ===
Pos	Team	Pld	W	D	L	GF	GA	GD	Pts	Promotion, qualification or relegation
1	Osasuna (P)	30	16	8	6	61	37	+24	40	Promotion to La Liga
2	España Industrial (O)	30	16	5	9	65	43	+22	37 (Note: España Industrial finished ahead of Avilés on head-to-head goal difference: Avilés–España Industrial 2–0, España Industrial–Avilés 6–2)	Qualification for the promotion playoffs
3	Avilés	30	16	5	9	59	46	+13	37	Qualification for the promotion playoffs
4	Alavés	30	16	3	11	58	48	+10	35	
5	Logroñés	30	14	6	10	59	44	+15	34	
6	Lérida	30	14	4	12	48	37	+11	32	
7	Baracaldo	30	12	7	11	54	41	+13	31	
8	San Andrés (Note: San Andrés quit Segunda División at the end of the season)	30	13	4	13	50	58	−8	30	Relegation to Tercera División
9	Ferrol	30	11	7	12	49	41	+8	29	
10	Caudal	30	11	6	13	45	48	−3	28 (Note: Caudal finished ahead of Sabadell on head-to-head points: Caudal–Sabadell 3–2, Sabadell–Caudal 0–1)	
11	Sabadell	30	10	8	12	41	55	−14	28	
12	Gimnástica Torrelavega (O)	30	12	3	15	41	57	−16	27	Qualification for the relegation playoffs
13	Salamanca (R)	30	11	4	15	42	53	−11	26	Qualification for the relegation playoffs
14	Gimnástico (R)	30	10	5	15	37	56	−19	25	Relegation to Tercera División
15	Huesca (R)	30	8	7	15	36	48	−12	23	Relegation to Tercera División
16	Burgos (R)	30	6	6	18	34	67	−33	18	Relegation to Tercera División

Source: BDFútbol
Rules for classification: 1) points; 2) head-to-head points; 3) head-to-head goal difference; 4) goal difference; 5) number of goals scored
(O) Play-off winners; (P) Promoted; (R) Relegated

=== Results ===
Home \ Away	ALA	AVI	BAR	BUR	CAU	CON	NAS	GIM	HUE	LLE	LOG	OSA	RFE	SAB	SAL	STA
Alavés	—	4–0	2–0	1–0	2–0	3–0	2–3	1–2	5–0	4–1	4–1	4–1	3–2	3–0	3–0	4–0
Avilés	7–1	—	0–0	2–0	1–0	2–0	3–0	3–2	3–0	3–1	3–1	2–1	1–0	4–0	4–1	5–0
Baracaldo	6–0	3–1	—	4–0	2–1	1–3	1–0	2–0	4–1	2–1	0–1	2–2	1–0	4–0	5–0	1–3
Burgos	2–2	3–0	2–2	—	3–2	1–2	3–0	1–1	1–0	0–0	0–3	1–2	3–4	2–3	0–2	2–4
Caudal	2–0	4–0	1–0	2–3	—	5–3	3–2	1–2	1–1	2–0	5–1	1–1	1–1	3–2	2–0	2–2
España Industrial	2–0	6–2	3–1	4–1	6–0	—	0–1	5–2	3–0	1–3	1–1	2–2	4–1	1–1	2–0	1–1
Gimnástico	5–1	0–2	2–1	2–3	2–1	1–0	—	4–3	1–1	1–0	1–1	1–3	2–2	0–0	2–1	0–1
Gimnástica Torrelavega	1–1	3–2	1–1	1–0	1–2	0–1	1–0	—	4–3	2–0	3–0	1–0	0–1	4–3	3–1	0–1
Huesca	3–0	0–1	1–1	7–0	1–1	3–1	0–2	2–0	—	1–0	3–0	2–0	1–1	1–2	1–2	1–1
Lérida	3–2	2–1	2–2	4–0	3–0	0–1	2–1	4–0	1–0	—	3–2	2–2	3–1	2–0	3–1	2–0
Logroñés	3–0	7–2	4–1	3–0	0–0	1–4	3–0	3–1	4–0	3–0	—	0–0	2–1	1–2	4–1	5–0
Osasuna	2–1	1–1	1–0	2–0	2–1	2–3	6–1	6–1	3–0	1–0	4–0	—	3–2	1–0	4–1	2–0
Ferrol	0–1	1–1	2–2	0–0	2–0	1–2	4–1	4–0	0–1	2–0	0–0	1–2	—	4–0	2–1	4–0
Sabadell	1–1	1–1	3–2	2–1	0–1	4–2	4–1	1–0	1–1	0–0	1–1	3–3	0–1	—	3–2	2–1
Salamanca	1–2	2–0	1–2	2–2	1–0	1–1	0–0	3–0	3–1	2–1	3–1	0–0	4–1	3–1	—	3–0
San Andrés	0–1	2–2	3–1	4–0	4–1	2–1	4–1	1–2	2–0	0–5	1–3	4–2	2–4	4–1	3–0	—

Source: BDFútbol
Legend: Blue = home team win; Yellow = draw; Red = away team win.

=== Top goalscorers ===
Goalscorers	Goals	Team
(Spain) Mauro Rodríguez	19	Avilés
(Spain) Luisito	17	Avilés
(Spain) Enrique Malo	17	Alavés
(Spain) Miguel Xirau	17	San Andrés
(Spain) Antonio Insa	16	Caudal

=== Top goalkeepers ===
Goalkeeper	Goals	Matches	Average	Team
(Spain) Goyo	30	27	1.11	Osasuna
(Spain) Primitivo Eroles	30	27	1.11	Lérida
(Spain) José María Munárriz	34	26	1.31	Avilés
(Spain) Pedro Estrems	40	29	1.38	España Industrial
(Spain) Rogelio Lozano	40	28	1.43	Caudal

== Group South ==
=== Teams ===
Location of teams in Segunda División 1952-53 Group South
Canary Islands

Club	City	Stadium
CD Alcoyano	Alcoy	Estadio El Collao
CD Atlético Baleares	Palma de Mallorca	Son Canals
Atlético Tetuán	Tétouan	Sania Ramel
CD Cacereño	Cáceres	Ciudad Deportiva
RCD Córdoba	Córdoba	El Árcangel
Granada CF	Granada	Los Cármenes
Hércules CF	Alicante	La Viña
Real Jaén CF	Jaén	La Victoria
UD Las Palmas	Las Palmas	Insular
RB Linense	La Línea de la Concepción	San Bernardo
RCD Mallorca	Palma de Mallorca	Es Fortí
UD Melilla	Melilla	Álvarez Claro
CD Mestalla	Valencia	Mestalla
Real Murcia	Murcia	La Condomina
Orihuela Deportiva CF	Orihuela	Los Arcos
AD Plus Ultra	Madrid	Campo de Ciudad Lineal

=== League table ===
Pos	Team	Pld	W	D	L	GF	GA	GD	Pts	Promotion, qualification or relegation
1	Jaén (P)	30	19	3	8	85	47	+38	41	Promotion to La Liga
2	Hércules	30	16	6	8	69	49	+20	38	Qualification for the promotion playoffs
3	Atlético Tetuán	30	15	6	9	66	39	+27	36	Qualification for the promotion playoffs
4	Las Palmas	30	16	3	11	55	38	+17	35	
5	Melilla	30	14	5	11	55	53	+2	33 (Note: Melilla finished ahead of Mestalla on head-to-head points: Melilla–Mestalla 2–1, Mestalla–Melilla 2–2)	
6	Mestalla	30	13	7	10	56	45	+11	33	
7	Alcoyano	30	14	2	14	70	64	+6	30 (Note: Alcoyano finished ahead of Mallorca and Granada on head-to-head goal difference)	
8	Mallorca	30	11	8	11	47	59	−12	30	
9	Granada	30	13	4	13	52	55	−3	30	
10	Linense	30	13	3	14	53	61	−8	29 (Note: Linense finished ahead of Murcia on head-to-head points: Linense–Murcia 2–1, Murcia–Linense 0–0)	
11	Murcia	30	11	7	12	53	43	+10	29	
12	Orihuela (R)	30	12	2	16	51	75	−24	26 (Note: Orihuela finished ahead of Real Córdoba on head-to-head points: Orihuela–Real Córdoba 0–0, Real Córdoba–Orihuela 1–2)	Qualification for the relegation playoffs
13	Real Córdoba (R)	30	9	8	13	55	62	−7	26	Qualification for the relegation playoffs
14	Atlético Baleares (R)	30	10	3	17	50	75	−25	23	Relegation to Tercera División
15	Plus Ultra (R)	30	7	8	15	57	70	−13	22	Relegation to Tercera División
16	Cacereño (R)	30	7	5	18	40	79	−39	19	Relegation to Tercera División

Source: BDFútbol
Rules for classification: 1) points; 2) head-to-head points; 3) head-to-head goal difference; 4) goal difference; 5) number of goals scored
(P) Promoted; (R) Relegated

=== Results ===
Home \ Away	ALC	BAL	TET	CAC	GRA	HER	JAE	LPA	LNS	MAL	MEL	MES	MUR	ORI	RMC	COR
Alcoyano	—	4–2	2–3	4–1	5–0	2–4	1–2	5–3	3–2	3–0	6–3	3–1	2–2	5–0	6–1	5–1
Atlético Baleares	3–1	—	1–2	2–1	1–1	4–3	3–4	0–1	2–0	1–1	1–3	3–0	2–0	7–1	2–1	4–1
Atlético Tetuán	1–1	5–0	—	3–0	3–0	1–2	3–1	1–1	1–2	5–0	2–0	1–1	3–1	7–0	5–1	2–2
Cacereño	1–3	3–1	0–2	—	1–3	1–1	2–1	1–4	5–1	2–2	5–3	1–1	2–1	3–0	2–2	2–2
Granada	2–0	5–0	1–0	3–1	—	0–0	3–1	1–0	5–0	3–1	2–0	0–1	1–1	6–0	4–0	5–1
Hércules	3–1	3–1	3–1	2–0	3–3	—	4–0	4–0	1–0	3–0	1–2	5–0	1–1	7–5	4–1	1–0
Jaén	5–0	5–1	1–0	5–0	9–0	2–0	—	5–1	3–1	4–3	5–0	4–2	3–2	5–1	5–2	2–0
Las Palmas	3–0	5–0	3–4	3–0	3–1	1–0	4–0	—	2–0	3–0	3–0	1–2	1–0	3–1	2–1	1–1
Linense	4–1	4–2	1–1	3–0	3–1	4–1	2–1	2–1	—	1–1	3–0	1–3	2–1	3–1	3–0	4–2
Mallorca	1–0	1–1	1–3	4–2	4–2	4–1	2–1	3–2	2–0	—	1–1	2–1	4–0	0–3	3–1	2–1
Melilla	5–1	2–0	2–0	3–0	1–0	2–2	0–3	0–0	4–1	1–1	—	2–1	4–1	1–0	3–1	1–0
Mestalla	3–0	6–0	1–4	1–0	3–0	1–1	0–1	0–1	4–3	3–0	2–2	—	2–0	2–1	3–0	6–2
Murcia	0–1	4–1	2–0	5–0	4–0	1–2	3–3	3–1	0–0	6–1	1–3	2–1	—	3–1	1–1	4–0
Orihuela	1–3	2–3	3–0	3–0	3–0	2–1	4–1	1–0	3–2	2–0	5–4	3–3	1–3	—	1–0	0–0
Plus Ultra	4–2	2–0	2–2	9–1	5–0	4–5	2–2	0–1	5–1	1–1	2–1	1–1	0–0	2–1	—	2–2
Real Córdoba	3–0	4–2	4–1	2–3	1–0	5–1	1–1	2–1	5–0	2–2	3–2	1–1	0–1	1–2	6–4	—

Source: BDFútbol
Legend: Blue = home team win; Yellow = draw; Red = away team win.

=== Top goalscorers ===
Goalscorers	Goals	Team
(Spain) Ángel Arregui	30	Jaén
(Spain) José Vila	17	Melilla
(Spain) José Caeiro	16	Hércules
(Spain) Antonio Picazo	16	Alcoyano
(Spain) Juan Vázquez	16	Plus Ultra

=== Top goalkeepers ===
Goalkeeper	Goals	Matches	Average	Team
(Spain) Pepín	38	30	1.27	Las Palmas
(Spain) Francisco Gómez	32	25	1.28	Murcia
(Spain) Eleusis Quiles	35	22	1.59	Hércules
(Spain) Candi	35	21	1.67	Granada
(Spain) Pedro González	50	30	1.67	Melilla

== Promotion playoffs ==
=== League table ===
Pos	Team	Pld	W	D	L	GF	GA	GD	Pts	Promotion or relegation
1	Deportivo La Coruña (O)	10	5	1	4	15	11	+4	11 (Note: Deportivo La Coruña finished ahead of España Industrial on head-to-head points: Deportivo La Coruña–España Industrial 0–0, España Industrial–Deportivo La Coruña 1–3)	Remained at La Liga
2	España Industrial (Note: Not promoted after being Barcelona reserve team) (O)	10	4	3	3	20	12	+8	11	
3	Celta Vigo	10	4	2	4	18	17	+1	10 (Note: Celta Vigo finished ahead of Atlético Tetuán on head-to-head points: Celta Vigo–Atlético Tetuán 4–1, Atlético Tetuán–Celta Vigo 0–0)	Remained at La Liga
4	Atlético Tetuán	10	4	2	4	15	13	+2	10	
5	Avilés	10	4	1	5	14	22	−8	9 (Note: Avilés finished ahead of Hércules on head-to-head points: Avilés–Hércules 2–0, Hércules–Avilés 1–1)	
6	Hércules	10	4	1	5	12	19	−7	9	

Source: BDFútbol
Rules for classification: 1) points; 2) head-to-head points; 3) head-to-head goal difference; 4) goal difference; 5) number of goals scored
(O) Play-off winners

=== Results ===
Home \ Away	TET	AVI	CEL	DEP	CON	HER
Atlético Tetuán	—	6–1	0–0	2–0	2–1	3–0
Avilés	1–0	—	4–1	1–0	1–3	2–0
Celta Vigo	4–1	4–2	—	1–3	1–1	5–1
Deportivo La Coruña	3–0	1–0	1–2	—	0–0	3–1
España Industrial	1–1	6–1	3–0	1–3	—	4–1
Hércules	2–0	1–1	1–0	3–1	2–0	—

Source: BDFútbol
Legend: Blue = home team win; Yellow = draw; Red = away team win.

== Relegation playoffs ==
=== Group 1 ===
==== League table ====
Pos	Team	Pld	W	D	L	GF	GA	GD	Pts	Promotion or relegation
1	Gimnástica Torrelavega (O)	8	5	0	3	17	11	+6	10	
2	Cultural Leonesa (O, P)	8	4	0	4	21	19	+2	8 (Note: Cultural Leonesa finished ahead of Mataró and Salamanca on head-to-head points: Cultural Leonesa 6 pts, Mataró 4 pts, Salamanca 2 pts)	Promotion to Segunda División
3	Mataró	8	4	0	4	17	16	+1	8	
4	Salamanca (R)	8	4	0	4	12	10	+2	8	
5	Sestao	8	3	0	5	11	22	−11	6	

Source: BDFútbol
Rules for classification: 1) points; 2) head-to-head points; 3) head-to-head goal difference; 4) goal difference; 5) number of goals scored
(O) Play-off winners; (P) Promoted; (R) Relegated

==== Results ====
Home \ Away	LEO	GIM	MAT	SAL	SES
Cultural Leonesa	—	2–4	3–1	3–1	6–0
Gimnástica Torrelavega	1–0	—	2–1	1–0	5–1
Mataró	7–2	3–2	—	1–0	3–1
Salamanca	1–2	2–1	4–1	—	3–1
Sestao	4–3	2–1	2–0	0–1	—

Source: BDFútbol
Legend: Blue = home team win; Yellow = draw; Red = away team win.

=== Group 2 ===
==== League table ====
Pos	Team	Pld	W	D	L	GF	GA	GD	Pts	Promotion or relegation
1	España Tánger	6	3	2	1	12	5	+7	8 (Note: España Tánger finished ahead of Levante on overall goal difference)	Promotion to Segunda División
2	Levante	6	3	2	1	15	11	+4	8	
3	Real Córdoba	6	1	3	2	13	16	−3	5	Relegation to Tercera División
4	Calvo Sotelo	6	1	1	4	12	20	−8	3	

Source: BDFútbol
Rules for classification: 1) points; 2) head-to-head points; 3) head-to-head goal difference; 4) goal difference; 5) number of goals scored

==== Results ====
Home \ Away	PUE	ESP	LEV	COR
Calvo Sotelo	—	2–2	1–3	5–0
España Tánger	5–0	—	1–0	2–0
Levante	5–3	1–0	—	3–3
Real Córdoba	5–1	2–2	3–3	—

Source: BDFútbol
Legend: Blue = home team win; Yellow = draw; Red = away team win.

=== Group 3 ===
24 May 1953	Orihuela	2–1	Tenerife	Orihuela
	Gallardo 55'; Calabuig 75'	Report	Antonio 35'	Stadium: Los Arcos; Referee: Asensi Martín

31 May 1953	Tenerife	3–0 (4–2 agg.)	Orihuela	Santa Cruz de Tenerife
	Paquillo 35'; Julito 55', 80'	Report		Stadium: Heliodoro Rodríguez López; Referee: Azón Roma
