= José Casas =

José Casas may refer to:

- Pepín (footballer, 1931–2010), José Casas Gris, Spanish football goalkeeper
- José Casas (cyclist) (born 1945), Spanish cyclist
- Pep Casas (born 2000), José Casas de Abadal, Spanish football midfielder for Inter Miami II
