= 1961–62 Segunda División =

31st season of the second-tier football league in Spain

Segunda División
- Season: 1961–62
- Champions: Deportivo La Coruña; Córdoba
- Promoted: Deportivo La Coruña; Córdoba; Valladolid; Málaga
- Relegated: San Sebastián; Albacete; Atlético Ceuta; Cultural Leonesa; Villarrobledo
- Matches: 480
- Goals: 1,450 (3.02 per match)
- Top goalscorer: Amancio Amaro (25 goals)
- Best goalkeeper: Juan María Benegas (0.73 goals/match)
- Biggest home win: Hércules 9–0 Villarrobledo (18 March 1962)
- Biggest away win: Recreativo 0–4 Córdoba (1 April 1962)
- Highest scoring: Real Gijón 8–2 Sabadell (31 December 1961)

The 1961–62 Segunda División season was the 31st since its establishment and was played between 3 September 1961 and 1 April 1962.

== Overview before the season ==
32 teams joined the league, including two relegated from the 1960–61 La Liga and 7 promoted from the 1960–61 Tercera División.

Relegated from La Liga

- Valladolid
- Granada

Promoted from Tercera División

- Alavés
- Atlético Baleares
- Albacete
- Recreativo
- Cartagena
- Burgos
- Villarrobledo

== Group North ==
=== Teams ===
Location of teams in Segunda División 1961-62 Group North

Club	City	Stadium
Deportivo Alavés	Vitoria	Mendizorroza
CD Atlético Baleares	Palma de Mallorca	Balear
CD Basconia	Basauri	Pedro López Cortázar
Burgos CF	Burgos	Zatorre
RC Celta de Vigo	Vigo	Balaídos
Cultural y Deportiva Leonesa	León	La Puentecilla
RC Deportivo La Coruña	La Coruña	Riazor
Real Gijón CF	Gijón	El Molinón
SD Indauchu	Bilbao	Garellano
CD Orense	Orense	José Antonio
AD Plus Ultra	Madrid	Campo de Ciudad Lineal
Pontevedra CF	Pontevedra	Pasarón
CD Sabadell FC	Sabadell	Cruz Alta
Salamanca	Salamanca	El Calvario
San Sebastián CF	San Sebastián	Atocha
Real Valladolid Deportivo	Valladolid	José Zorrilla

=== League table ===
Pos	Team	Pld	W	D	L	GF	GA	GD	Pts	Promotion, qualification or relegation
1	Deportivo La Coruña (P)	30	17	9	4	68	35	+33	43	Promotion to La Liga
2	Valladolid (O, P)	30	17	6	7	64	31	+33	40	Qualification for the promotion playoffs
3	Orense	30	14	9	7	39	34	+5	37	
4	Alavés	30	15	5	10	48	39	+9	35	
5	San Sebastián (Note: As a reserve team, San Sebastián was relegated to Tercera División after Real Sociedad relegation to Segunda División) (R)	30	13	8	9	60	44	+16	34	Relegation to Tercera División
6	Celta Vigo	30	13	7	10	53	36	+17	33	
7	Plus Ultra	30	11	7	12	47	40	+7	29	
8	Sabadell	30	11	6	13	43	60	−17	28	
9	Pontevedra	30	12	3	15	43	44	−1	27 (Note: Pontevedra finished ahead of Atlético Baleares and Burgos on head-to-head points: Pontevedra 5 pts, Atlético Baleares 4 pts, Burgos 3 pts)	
10	Atlético Baleares	30	10	7	13	41	53	−12	27	
11	Burgos	30	10	7	13	39	47	−8	27	
12	Salamanca	30	11	4	15	46	56	−10	26	
13	Real Gijón	30	10	5	15	52	63	−11	25 (Note: Real Gijón finished ahead of Indauchu on head-to-head goal difference: Real Gijón–Indauchu 3–1, Indauchu–Real Gijón 1–0)	
14	Indauchu (O)	30	10	5	15	39	50	−11	25	Qualification for the relegation playoffs
15	Basconia (O)	30	8	6	16	33	51	−18	22 (Note: Basconia finished ahead of Cultural Leonesa on overall goal difference)	Qualification for the relegation playoffs
16	Cultural Leonesa (R)	30	8	6	16	34	66	−32	22	Relegation to Tercera División

Source: BDFútbol
Rules for classification: 1) points; 2) head-to-head points; 3) head-to-head goal difference; 4) goal difference; 5) number of goals scored
(O) Play-off winners; (P) Promoted; (R) Relegated

=== Top goalscorers ===
Goalscorers	Goals	Team
(Spain) Amancio Amaro	25	Deportivo La Coruña
(Spain) Chapela	23	Real Gijón
(Spain) Delio Morollón	21	Valladolid
(Spain) Abel Fernández	19	Orense
(Spain) José Miguel Olano	18	San Sebastián

=== Top goalkeepers ===
Goalkeeper	Goals	Matches	Average	Team
(Spain) Juan Zumalabe	28	27	1.04	Valladolid
(Spain) José Ramón Ibarreche	34	30	1.13	Orense
(Spain) Jesús Larzábal	34	29	1.17	Alavés
(Spain) Javier Gato	29	23	1.26	Pontevedra
(Spain) Carlos Patiño	40	30	1.33	Plus Ultra

=== Results ===
Home \ Away	ALA	BAL	BAS	BUR	CEL	CUL	DEP	GIJ	IND	ORE	PLU	PON	SAB	SAL	SSE	VLD
Alavés	—	1–2	4–3	2–2	3–0	1–0	2–1	4–0	4–1	1–2	3–1	1–0	5–0	2–1	0–1	1–1
Atlético Baleares	2–3	—	1–1	3–1	1–0	2–0	1–1	4–0	4–1	1–2	3–0	1–0	1–1	2–2	3–2	0–2
Basconia	0–0	2–0	—	0–1	1–1	2–1	1–1	5–0	0–0	0–2	0–1	2–1	3–1	0–0	1–2	2–0
Burgos	2–0	3–0	3–1	—	1–1	2–0	1–3	1–2	0–3	3–0	3–0	2–2	2–0	2–2	3–2	1–0
Celta Vigo	3–0	3–0	5–1	4–0	—	7–2	1–1	3–0	2–1	0–0	2–0	2–1	0–0	4–2	4–0	4–1
Cultural Leonesa	0–1	1–1	2–1	0–0	3–1	—	2–1	1–1	2–1	2–0	2–5	3–2	0–0	2–1	1–0	2–2
Deportivo La Coruña	1–1	2–0	5–1	6–1	2–0	3–2	—	4–0	2–1	4–1	1–1	3–2	5–1	4–1	1–1	2–0
Gijón	1–2	5–1	2–1	1–1	1–3	2–2	2–4	—	3–1	3–1	3–0	5–2	8–2	1–0	4–1	1–1
Indauchu	3–3	1–1	0–2	2–1	2–0	3–0	2–0	1–0	—	1–1	1–0	0–0	3–2	3–1	2–3	1–2
Orense	1–0	2–1	5–0	2–1	0–0	3–1	1–1	2–1	3–1	—	0–0	2–0	2–1	2–1	0–0	1–1
Plus Ultra	0–1	4–0	1–0	4–1	3–0	5–1	2–2	5–0	0–1	0–0	—	0–2	3–2	6–3	1–1	1–0
Pontevedra	0–1	2–1	2–0	1–0	1–0	3–0	0–3	2–1	2–1	1–2	1–1	—	5–0	4–1	3–2	1–2
Sabadell	1–0	3–3	1–0	1–1	3–2	4–0	2–2	2–1	3–1	2–1	2–1	2–0	—	2–0	1–2	1–0
Salamanca	3–1	0–2	0–1	2–0	2–1	3–1	0–1	1–0	2–1	4–1	2–0	1–0	2–1	—	3–3	3–0
San Sebastián	2–1	4–0	5–2	2–0	0–0	4–1	1–2	2–2	4–0	3–0	1–1	0–2	4–1	5–1	—	3–3
Valladolid	5–0	4–0	4–0	1–0	4–0	5–0	4–0	4–2	3–0	0–0	2–1	5–1	3–1	4–2	1–0	—

Source: BDFútbol
Legend: Blue = home team win; Yellow = draw; Red = away team win.

== Group South ==
=== Teams ===
Location of teams in Segunda División 1961-62 Group South
Canary Islands

Club	City	Stadium
Albacete Balompié	Albacete	Carlos Belmonte
Cádiz CF	Cádiz	Ramón de Carranza
CD Cartagena	Cartagena	El Almarjal
CA Ceuta	Ceuta	Alfonso Murube
Córdoba CF	Córdoba	El Arcángel
Granada CF	Granada	Los Cármenes
Hércules CF	Alicante	La Viña
Real Jaén CF	Jaén	La Victoria
UD Las Palmas	Las Palmas	Insular
Levante UD	Valencia	Vallejo
CD Málaga	Málaga	La Rosaleda
CD Mestalla	Valencia	Mestalla
Real Murcia	Murcia	La Condomina
Recreativo de Huelva	Huelva	Municipal
CD San Fernando	San Fernando	Marqués de Varela
CD Villarrobledo	Villarrobledo	Nuestra Señora de la Caridad

=== League table ===
Pos	Team	Pld	W	D	L	GF	GA	GD	Pts	Promotion, qualification or relegation
1	Córdoba (P)	30	16	8	6	48	22	+26	40	Promotion to La Liga
2	Málaga (O, P)	30	14	10	6	52	36	+16	38	Qualification for the promotion playoffs
3	Granada	30	15	6	9	48	34	+14	36	
4	Las Palmas	30	15	5	10	47	39	+8	35	
5	Recreativo	30	13	7	10	43	42	+1	33	
6	Levante	30	14	4	12	49	42	+7	32 (Note: Levante finished ahead of Hércules on head-to-head goal difference: Hércules–Levante 2–1, Levante–Hércules 3–1)	
7	Hércules	30	14	4	12	55	46	+9	32	
8	Murcia	30	12	7	11	40	35	+5	31 (Note: Murcia finished ahead of Jaén on head-to-head points: Murcia–Jaén 3–0, Jaén–Murcia 0–0)	
9	Jaén	30	14	3	13	58	42	+16	31	
10	Cádiz	30	12	4	14	43	52	−9	28 (Note: Cádiz finished ahead of Cartagena on head-to-head goal difference: Cartagena–Cádiz 2–0, Cádiz–Cartagena 5–1)	
11	Cartagena	30	13	2	15	45	56	−11	28	
12	Mestalla	30	11	5	14	50	49	+1	27 (Note: Mestalla finished ahead of Albacete and San Fernando on head-to-head points: Mestalla 5 pts, Albacete 4 pts, San Fernando 3 pts)	
13	Albacete (R)	30	10	7	13	27	32	−5	27	Qualification for the relegation playoffs
14	San Fernando (O)	30	11	5	14	37	47	−10	27	Qualification for the relegation playoffs
15	Atlético Ceuta (R)	30	8	7	15	33	48	−15	23	Relegation to Tercera División
16	Villarrobledo (R)	30	4	4	22	26	79	−53	12	Relegation to Tercera División

Source: BDFútbol
Rules for classification: 1) points; 2) head-to-head points; 3) head-to-head goal difference; 4) goal difference; 5) number of goals scored
(O) Play-off winners; (P) Promoted; (R) Relegated

=== Top goalscorers ===
Goalscorers	Goals	Team
(Spain) Antonio Conesa	23	Jaén
(Spain) Erasto León	18	Las Palmas
(Spain) Mendi	15	Málaga
(Spain) Ángel Arregui	15	Jaén
(Spain) Miguel Sánchez	15	Cádiz

=== Top goalkeepers ===
Goalkeeper	Goals	Matches	Average	Team
(Spain) Juan María Benegas	22	30	0.73	Córdoba
(Spain) Antonio Ramírez	25	26	0.96	Murcia
(Spain) Américo Canas	28	26	1.08	Málaga
(Spain) José Luis Ulacia	29	22	1.32	Las Palmas
(Spain) Joaquín Valero	35	25	1.4	Mestalla

=== Results ===
Home \ Away	ALB	CÁD	CAR	CEU	CÓR	GRA	HÉR	JAÉ	LPA	LEV	MGA	MES	MUR	REC	SFE	VRB
Albacete	—	3–0	4–1	2–0	1–1	2–1	0–2	2–0	0–2	1–1	1–1	1–0	1–1	1–0	2–0	1–0
Cádiz	0–0	—	5–1	1–0	1–1	2–1	1–2	2–1	3–2	3–0	2–1	3–0	2–1	2–1	1–1	4–1
Cartagena	1–0	2–0	—	3–0	1–0	1–2	3–1	0–2	4–0	3–0	3–0	2–1	0–1	0–1	1–2	3–1
Atlético Ceuta	2–0	3–1	0–1	—	1–0	0–0	2–2	2–0	0–1	2–0	2–2	1–1	2–1	2–2	1–1	4–0
Córdoba	1–1	4–1	5–0	3–2	—	1–0	0–0	1–0	2–0	5–0	0–0	1–0	0–0	2–1	3–0	2–0
Granada	2–1	1–3	2–1	3–1	3–0	—	5–1	1–0	2–0	3–2	1–1	0–0	3–0	1–1	2–1	3–0
Hércules	2–0	2–1	5–2	2–0	1–3	3–2	—	0–0	1–0	2–1	1–1	3–5	1–2	1–0	3–1	9–0
Real Jaén	3–0	6–0	4–0	6–2	0–1	0–3	2–1	—	2–1	3–0	2–1	6–2	0–0	6–2	1–0	6–2
Las Palmas	3–1	3–0	3–4	0–0	1–1	2–2	2–0	2–1	—	1–0	2–0	2–0	1–1	3–2	2–1	4–0
Levante	1–0	2–0	6–0	3–0	1–2	4–1	3–1	2–2	3–1	—	2–0	1–2	2–2	3–0	1–2	2–0
Málaga	0–0	3–0	2–1	4–2	1–0	2–0	3–2	3–0	3–1	1–1	—	3–1	2–0	4–1	3–2	3–2
Mestalla	2–0	3–2	4–1	2–0	0–1	0–1	0–1	4–0	2–2	0–2	2–2	—	2–1	2–0	8–1	3–0
Real Murcia	2–1	2–1	1–1	2–0	2–1	1–2	1–4	3–0	0–1	1–2	1–1	1–0	—	1–2	3–0	4–1
Recreativo	1–0	3–1	0–0	1–0	0–4	1–0	3–2	3–2	3–1	4–2	1–1	6–0	2–1	—	0–0	2–0
San Fernando	2–0	1–0	2–0	1–2	2–1	2–0	2–0	2–1	0–1	0–1	2–1	3–3	0–1	0–0	—	4–2
Villarrobledo	0–1	1–1	2–5	3–0	2–2	1–1	1–0	0–2	1–3	0–1	1–3	2–1	0–3	0–0	3–2	—

Source: BDFútbol
Legend: Blue = home team win; Yellow = draw; Red = away team win.

== Promotion playoffs ==
=== First leg ===
22 April 1962	Málaga	3–0	Real Santander	Málaga
	Mendi 14'; Ben Barek 66'; Rovira 67'	Report		Stadium: La Rosaleda; Referee: Zariquiegui Izco

29 April 1962	Español	1–0	Valladolid	Barcelona
	Índio 27'	Report		Stadium: Sarrià; Referee: Gardeazabal Garay

=== Second leg ===
29 April 1962	Real Santander	1–0 (1–3 agg.)	Málaga	Santander
	Wilson 22'	Report		Stadium: El Sardinero; Referee: Lloris Antonino

6 May 1962	Valladolid	2–0 (2–1 agg.)	Español	Valladolid
	García 74'; Rodilla 88'	Report		Stadium: José Zorrilla; Referee: Birigay Nieva

== Relegation playoffs ==
=== First leg ===
27 May 1962	Alcoyano	0–0	Basconia	Alcoy
		Report		Stadium: El Collao; Referee: Carbelo Martín

27 May 1962	Melilla	0–0	Albacete	Melilla
		Report		Stadium: Álvarez Claro; Referee: Segrelles del Pilar

27 May 1962	Condal	0–3	Indauchu	Barcelona
		Report	Urquijo 25'; Abásolo 59', 73'	Stadium: Les Corts; Referee: Martín Álvarez

27 May 1962	Avilés	2–3	San Fernando	Avilés
	Doval 31', 73'	Report	Aguilera 11'; Cantón 28'; Jesús 66' (o.g.)	Stadium: La Exposición; Referee: Cerezuela Ruiz

=== Second leg ===
3 June 1962	Basconia	2–1 (2–1 agg.)	Alcoyano	Basauri
	Saiz 70'; Ayarza 88'	Report	Ocaña 22'	Stadium: Pedro López Cortázar; Referee: Uría González

3 June 1962	Albacete	0–0 (0–0 agg.)	Melilla	Albacete
		Report		Stadium: Carlos Belmonte; Referee: Mateu Bernat

3 June 1962	Indauchu	1–1 (4–1 agg.)	Condal	Bilbao
	Díez 87'	Report	Pons 34'	Stadium: Garellano; Referee: Feal Seijas

3 June 1962	San Fernando	5–2 (8–4 agg.)	Avilés	San Fernando
	Cantón 4', 12'; Alias 30', 78'; Naranjo 88'	Report	Prendes 60'; Doval 65'	Stadium: Marqués de Varela; Referee: Álvarez Martínez

=== Tiebreaker ===
5 June 1962	Melilla	2–0	Albacete	Madrid
	Rojas 15', 65'	Report		Stadium: Vallecas; Referee: López Montenegro
