= 1953–54 Segunda División =

23rd season of the second-tier football league in Spain

Segunda División
- Season: 1953–54
- Champions: Alavés; Las Palmas
- Promoted: Alavés; Las Palmas; Málaga; Hércules
- Relegated: Melilla; Gimnástica Torrelavega; Alcoyano; Salamanca; Mestalla; Escoriaza; Mallorca
- Matches: 480
- Goals: 1,700 (3.54 per match)
- Top goalscorer: Chas (23 goals)
- Best goalkeeper: Pepín (0.96 goals/match)
- Biggest home win: Tenerife 8–0 Mallorca (20 December 1953)
- Biggest away win: Avilés 0–6 Cultural Leonesa (21 February 1954)
- Highest scoring: Zaragoza 8–1 Ferrol (4 October 1953); España Tánger 6–3 Murcia (6 December 1953); Mestalla 5–4 Linense (19 December 1953); Atlético Tetuán 5–4 Castellón (7 March 1954)

The 1953–54 Segunda División season was the 23rd since its establishment and was played between 12 September 1953 and 25 April 1954.

== Overview before the season ==
32 teams joined the league, including two relegated from the 1952–53 La Liga and 8 promoted from the 1952–53 Tercera División.

Relegated from La Liga

- Málaga
- Zaragoza

Promoted from Tercera División

- La Felguera
- Eibar
- Escoriaza
- Badajoz
- Castellón
- Xerez
- Cultural Leonesa
- España Tánger

== Group North ==
=== Teams ===
Location of teams in Segunda División 1953-54 Group North

Club	City	Stadium
Deportivo Alavés	Vitoria	Mendizorroza
Real Avilés CF	Avilés	Las Arobias
Club Baracaldo	Baracaldo	Lasesarre
Caudal Deportivo	Mieres	El Batán
Cultural y Deportiva Leonesa	León	El Ejido
SD Eibar	Eibar	Ipurúa
SD Escoriaza	Zaragoza	Las Delicias
SD España Industrial	Barcelona	Les Corts
Club Ferrol	Ferrol	Inferniño
RS Gimnástica de Torrelavega	Torrelavega	El Malecón
CP La Felguera	La Felguera, Langreo	La Barraca
UD Lérida	Lérida	Campo de Deportes
CD Logroñés	Logroño	Las Gaunas
CD Sabadell FC	Sabadell	Cruz Alta
UD Salamanca	Salamanca	El Calvario
Real Zaragoza	Zaragoza	Torrero

=== League table ===
Pos	Team	Pld	W	D	L	GF	GA	GD	Pts	Promotion or relegation
1	Alavés (P)	30	17	7	6	65	42	+23	41	Promotion to La Liga
2	Baracaldo	30	17	4	9	56	36	+20	38 (Note: Baracaldo finished ahead of Lérida on head-to-head goal difference: Lérida–Baracaldo 4–2, Baracaldo–Lérida 3–0)	Qualification for the promotion playoffs
3	Lérida	30	16	6	8	62	44	+18	38	Qualification for the promotion playoffs
4	Cultural Leonesa	30	15	4	11	63	46	+17	34	
5	España Industrial	30	12	9	9	62	48	+14	33	
6	Sabadell	30	14	4	12	52	53	−1	32	
7	Eibar	30	10	9	11	56	54	+2	29 (Note: Eibar finished ahead of Ferrol and Zaragoza on head-to-head points: Eibar 5 pts, Ferrol 4 pts, Zaragoza 3 pts)	
8	Ferrol	30	12	5	13	44	58	−14	29	
9	Zaragoza	30	11	7	12	76	59	+17	29	
10	Logroñés	30	12	4	14	65	55	+10	28 (Note: Logroñés finished ahead of Avilés and Caudal on head-to-head points: Logroñés 6 pts, Avilés 5 pts, Caudal 1 pt)	
11	Avilés	30	9	10	11	45	61	−16	28	
12	Caudal (O)	30	11	6	13	38	46	−8	28	Qualification for the relegation playoffs
13	La Felguera (O)	30	10	5	15	49	63	−14	25 (Note: La Felguera finished ahead of Gimnástica Torrelavega on head-to-head goal difference: La Felguera–Gimnástica Torrelavega 4–1, Gimnástica Torrelavega–La Felguera 4–3)	Qualification for the relegation playoffs
14	Gimnástica Torrelavega (R)	30	11	3	16	35	64	−29	25	Relegation to Tercera División
15	Salamanca (R)	30	8	6	16	44	56	−12	22	Relegation to Tercera División
16	Escoriaza (R)	30	8	5	17	42	69	−27	21	Relegation to Tercera División

Source: BDFútbol
Rules for classification: 1) points; 2) head-to-head points; 3) head-to-head goal difference; 4) goal difference; 5) number of goals scored
(O) Play-off winners; (P) Promoted; (R) Relegated

=== Results ===
Home \ Away	ALA	AVI	BAR	CAU	LEO	EIB	ESC	CON	GIM	FEL	LLE	LOG	RFE	SAB	SAL	ZAR
Alavés	—	2–0	2–1	1–0	3–2	2–2	3–1	3–1	1–0	5–2	4–1	5–0	6–0	3–1	4–1	4–4
Avilés	2–2	—	1–0	1–0	0–6	3–3	1–1	1–1	5–0	4–2	1–1	1–1	3–2	4–0	2–2	4–2
Baracaldo	0–3	5–0	—	6–1	0–0	3–2	1–0	3–0	0–0	3–1	3–0	4–3	3–0	4–0	1–5	3–2
Caudal	1–2	0–2	0–1	—	3–2	4–2	1–0	2–1	1–3	3–1	1–1	0–0	1–0	1–0	2–1	1–0
Cultural Leonesa	3–1	5–0	1–0	4–2	—	1–1	4–1	2–0	3–1	2–0	0–1	4–1	1–0	2–2	1–0	0–0
Eibar	0–1	1–1	0–1	1–1	6–0	—	3–1	1–1	1–1	2–1	2–4	3–1	2–0	6–1	5–0	3–1
Escoriaza	4–1	4–3	0–0	2–1	3–5	2–1	—	2–2	2–3	2–3	1–3	2–1	3–1	2–3	2–1	0–3
España Industrial	2–2	1–1	3–0	1–1	2–3	7–1	4–1	—	6–0	2–1	3–3	5–2	2–3	1–1	2–0	2–1
Gimnástica Torrelavega	2–1	2–0	3–2	2–1	1–0	0–1	3–0	2–3	—	4–3	0–3	1–3	1–2	2–0	1–0	1–1
La Felguera	6–0	1–1	2–3	0–0	2–1	2–1	1–1	0–1	4–1	—	3–1	3–2	1–1	2–0	3–0	3–2
Lérida	2–1	4–0	4–2	2–2	2–4	0–1	3–1	1–0	3–0	3–0	—	4–1	5–1	1–0	1–0	4–4
Logroñés	0–1	6–2	0–1	3–1	2–1	5–0	0–0	2–4	5–0	3–0	3–1	—	6–0	3–2	3–0	5–1
Ferrol	0–0	3–0	2–2	1–2	2–1	3–1	0–1	1–0	2–0	4–0	2–1	4–1	—	3–2	2–2	2–0
Sabadell	0–0	3–1	1–0	1–0	3–2	5–2	4–0	2–2	3–0	4–0	2–0	3–2	1–0	—	3–1	4–3
Salamanca	3–1	1–0	0–1	1–5	3–2	0–0	5–0	1–2	5–0	1–1	1–1	1–0	2–2	3–0	—	3–4
Zaragoza	1–1	0–1	0–3	4–0	4–1	2–2	5–3	5–1	3–1	6–1	1–2	1–1	8–1	3–1	5–1	—

Source: BDFútbol
Legend: Blue = home team win; Yellow = draw; Red = away team win.

=== Top goalscorers ===
Goalscorers	Goals	Team
(Spain) Chas	23	Cultural Leonesa
(Spain) Jaime Parés	18	Zaragoza
(Spain) Carlos Uncilla	16	Eibar
(Spain) Francisco Anta	16	Logroñés
(Spain) Julio Remacha	14	Alavés

=== Top goalkeepers ===
Goalkeeper	Goals	Matches	Average	Team
(Spain) Francisco Urquiola	31	29	1.07	Baracaldo
(Spain) Javier Berasaluce	41	30	1.37	Alavés
(Spain) Primitivo Eroles	32	22	1.45	Lérida
(Spain) Amaro Méndez	46	30	1.53	Cultural Leonesa
(Spain) Edu García	42	23	1.83	Eibar

== Group South ==
=== Teams ===
Location of teams in Segunda División 1953-54 Group South
Canary Islands

Club	City	Stadium
CD Alcoyano	Alcoy	Estadio El Collao
Atlético Tetuán	Tétouan	Sania Ramel
CD Badajoz	Badajoz	El Vivero
CD Castellón	Castellón de la Plana	Castalia
UD España Tánger	Tangier	Stadium Municipal
Granada CF	Granada	Los Cármenes
Hércules CF	Alicante	La Viña
Jerez CD	Jerez de la Frontera	Domecq
UD Las Palmas	Las Palmas	Insular
RB Linense	La Línea de la Concepción	San Bernardo
CD Málaga	Málaga	La Rosaleda
RCD Mallorca	Palma de Mallorca	Es Fortí
UD Melilla	Melilla	Álvarez Claro
CD Mestalla	Valencia	Mestalla
Real Murcia	Murcia	La Condomina
CD Tenerife	Santa Cruz de Tenerife	Heliodoro Rodríguez López

=== League table ===
Pos	Team	Pld	W	D	L	GF	GA	GD	Pts	Promotion or relegation
1	Las Palmas (P)	30	16	7	7	58	33	+25	39	Promotion to La Liga
2	Hércules (O, P)	30	17	4	9	55	40	+15	38 (Note: Hércules finished ahead of Málaga on head-to-head points: Málaga–Hércules 0–1, Hércules–Málaga 0–0)	Qualification for the promotion playoffs
3	Málaga	30	16	6	8	60	30	+30	38	Qualification for the promotion playoffs
4	Granada	30	17	2	11	63	36	+27	36	
5	Castellón	30	16	1	13	67	61	+6	33 (Note: Castellón finished ahead of Tenerife and Atlético Tetuán on head-to-head goal difference)	
6	Tenerife	30	14	5	11	56	41	+15	33	
7	Atlético Tetuán	30	15	3	12	60	46	+14	33	
8	España Tánger	30	15	1	14	60	57	+3	31	
9	Badajoz	30	11	8	11	66	55	+11	30 (Note: Badajoz finished ahead of Linense on head-to-head goal difference: Linense–Badajoz 3–2, Badajoz–Linense 3–0)	
10	Linense	30	13	4	13	46	59	−13	30	
11	Xerez	30	12	5	13	50	54	−4	29	
12	Murcia (O)	30	10	7	13	45	54	−9	27	Qualification for the relegation playoffs
13	Melilla (R)	30	11	4	15	37	70	−33	26	Qualification for the relegation playoffs
14	Alcoyano (R)	30	8	9	13	35	49	−14	25	Relegation to Tercera División
15	Mestalla (R)	30	10	3	17	48	58	−10	23	Relegation to Tercera División
16	Mallorca (R)	30	3	3	24	40	103	−63	9	Relegation to Tercera División

Source: BDFútbol
Rules for classification: 1) points; 2) head-to-head points; 3) head-to-head goal difference; 4) goal difference; 5) number of goals scored
(O) Play-off winners; (P) Promoted; (R) Relegated

=== Results ===
Home \ Away	ALC	TET	BAD	CAS	ESP	GRA	HER	LPA	LNS	CDM	MAL	MEL	MES	MUR	TEN	XER
Alcoyano	—	2–0	4–2	4–3	2–0	0–0	1–1	4–1	2–2	0–0	5–1	1–0	2–0	1–1	1–1	1–1
Atlético Tetuán	4–0	—	1–1	5–4	5–2	1–0	4–0	3–2	3–0	2–0	5–1	0–0	4–1	0–0	0–1	6–0
Badajoz	2–1	3–1	—	2–0	6–2	4–1	0–2	0–0	3–0	1–1	5–1	7–0	1–1	5–0	1–2	6–2
Castellón	4–0	6–1	4–1	—	3–0	1–0	2–0	3–1	5–0	1–0	5–2	5–2	2–1	2–1	2–0	5–2
España Tánger	1–0	1–2	3–0	3–0	—	3–0	2–1	1–0	4–0	2–1	6–0	2–1	2–0	6–3	4–1	3–1
Granada	3–0	1–0	6–2	7–1	4–0	—	1–2	1–1	3–1	1–0	6–2	7–0	2–0	2–1	2–1	2–0
Hércules	3–1	2–0	3–3	3–3	4–1	3–1	—	1–2	3–1	0–0	5–0	2–1	1–0	2–1	3–0	3–0
Las Palmas	3–1	2–0	1–1	7–0	2–0	2–0	2–1	—	2–0	3–1	6–0	3–0	1–0	1–0	1–1	4–3
Linense	1–0	2–1	3–2	1–0	2–4	2–1	1–0	2–0	—	3–1	5–1	3–0	1–0	2–2	3–3	1–0
Málaga	2–0	5–1	1–0	3–0	3–1	1–2	0–1	6–2	1–1	—	3–1	4–0	3–0	5–0	4–1	1–0
Mallorca	0–0	1–3	2–3	5–2	4–1	1–2	1–2	0–2	3–1	1–2	—	1–1	3–3	1–2	3–4	2–4
Melilla	2–2	2–1	1–1	1–0	4–2	2–1	2–0	1–0	2–3	0–4	2–0	—	4–2	3–1	1–0	1–0
Mestalla	1–0	2–3	4–1	0–1	3–1	1–3	2–0	1–1	5–4	2–3	5–2	4–1	—	1–0	1–0	5–0
Murcia	4–0	2–1	2–2	3–1	2–1	0–2	2–3	2–3	3–1	1–1	2–1	4–2	3–2	—	1–0	1–1
Tenerife	4–0	1–2	1–0	1–0	1–1	3–2	5–2	0–0	1–0	2–3	8–0	6–1	4–0	1–0	—	2–1
Xerez	2–0	2–1	5–1	5–2	2–1	1–0	1–2	0–0	4–0	1–1	3–0	3–0	3–1	1–1	2–1	—

Source: BDFútbol
Legend: Blue = home team win; Yellow = draw; Red = away team win.

=== Top goalscorers ===
Goalscorers	Goals	Team
(Spain) Antonio Pedrero	20	Tenerife
(Spain) Miguel Xirau	20	Linense
(Spain) Rafa Delgado	18	Granada
(Spain) Nasio	18	Badajoz
(Spain) Virgilio Badenes	18	Mestalla

=== Top goalkeepers ===
Goalkeeper	Goals	Matches	Average	Team
(Spain) Pepín	27	28	0.96	Las Palmas
(Spain) José Surribas	24	21	1.14	Atlético Tetuán
(Spain) Rafael Piris	26	22	1.18	Granada
(Spain) Francisco Gómez	38	26	1.46	Murcia
(Spain) Rafael Ferrer	40	27	1.48	Alcoyano

== Promotion playoffs ==
=== League table ===
Pos	Team	Pld	W	D	L	GF	GA	GD	Pts	Promotion or relegation
1	Málaga	10	6	3	1	21	15	+6	15	Promotion to La Liga
2	Hércules (O, P)	10	5	3	2	16	10	+6	13	Promotion to La Liga
3	Osasuna (R)	10	4	3	3	23	20	+3	11	
4	Baracaldo	10	3	3	4	18	20	−2	9	
5	Lérida	10	3	2	5	27	30	−3	8	
6	Jaén (R)	10	1	2	7	15	25	−10	4	

Source: BDFútbol
Rules for classification: 1) points; 2) head-to-head points; 3) head-to-head goal difference; 4) goal difference; 5) number of goals scored
(O) Play-off winners; (P) Promoted; (R) Relegated

=== Results ===
Home \ Away	BAR	HER	JAE	LLE	CDM	OSA
Baracaldo	—	0–1	3–2	4–0	1–0	3–3
Hércules	2–2	—	2–0	6–1	1–1	2–0
Jaén	0–0	0–1	—	4–3	1–2	0–1
Lérida	7–2	5–1	2–2	—	1–2	2–2
Málaga	3–2	0–0	3–2	5–3	—	1–1
Osasuna	2–1	1–0	8–4	2–3	3–4	—

Source: BDFútbol
Legend: Blue = home team win; Yellow = draw; Red = away team win.

== Relegation playoffs ==
=== Group 1 ===
==== League table ====
Pos	Team	Pld	W	D	L	GF	GA	GD	Pts	Promotion or relegation
1	Caudal (O)	8	6	0	2	16	7	+9	12	Remained at Segunda División
2	La Felguera (O)	8	4	1	3	15	13	+2	9	Remained at Segunda División
3	Ponferradina	8	3	2	3	10	13	−3	8	
4	Huesca	8	3	1	4	13	16	−3	7	
5	Girona	8	2	0	6	13	18	−5	4	

Source: BDFútbol
Rules for classification: 1) points; 2) head-to-head points; 3) head-to-head goal difference; 4) goal difference; 5) number of goals scored
(O) Play-off winners

==== Results ====
Home \ Away	CAU	GIR	HUE	FEL	PNF
Caudal	—	3–1	2–0	4–1	1–0
Girona	1–3	—	2–1	1–2	5–1
Huesca	0–3	3–1	—	3–1	4–0
La Felguera	2–0	2–1	6–1	—	1–1
Ponferradina	2–0	3–1	1–1	2–0	—

Source: BDFútbol
Legend: Blue = home team win; Yellow = draw; Red = away team win.

=== Group 2 ===
==== League table ====
Pos	Team	Pld	W	D	L	GF	GA	GD	Pts	Promotion or relegation
1	San Fernando (O, P)	8	5	0	3	26	13	+13	10 (Note: San Fernando finished ahead of Murcia on head-to-head goal difference: Murcia–San Fernando 3–2, San Fernando–Murcia 3–1)	Promotion to Segunda División
2	Murcia (O)	8	5	0	3	23	9	+14	10	
3	Cacereño	8	4	0	4	12	22	−10	8	
4	Melilla (R)	8	3	0	5	16	17	−1	6 (Note: Melilla finished ahead of Orihuela on head-to-head goal difference: Orihuela–Melilla 1–0, Melilla–Orihuela 7–0)	Relegation to Tercera División
5	Orihuela	8	3	0	5	8	24	−16	6	

Source: BDFútbol
Rules for classification: 1) points; 2) head-to-head points; 3) head-to-head goal difference; 4) goal difference; 5) number of goals scored
(O) Play-off winners; (P) Promoted; (R) Relegated

==== Results ====
Home \ Away	CAC	MEL	MUR	ORI	SFE
Cacereño	—	2–1	2–1	3–1	2–1
Melilla	4–1	—	1–0	7–0	2–4
Murcia	7–0	3–0	—	7–1	3–2
Orihuela	3–0	1–0	0–1	—	2–0
San Fernando	4–2	6–1	3–1	6–0	—

Source: BDFútbol
Legend: Blue = home team win; Yellow = draw; Red = away team win.
