= Joaquim Torrent =

Spanish footballer

Personal information
- Full name: Joaquim Torrent Dalmau
- Birth name: Joaquim Torrent i Dalmau
- Date of birth: 22 June 1917
- Place of birth: Girona, Spain
- Date of death: 12 September 1971 (aged 54)
- Place of death: El Prat de Llobregat, Spain
- Height: 1.79 m (5 ft 10 in)
- Position: Midfielder

Senior career*
Years	Team	Apps	(Gls)
1939–1941	AE Prat		
1941–1943	Espanyol		
1942–1943	→ Reus Deportiu (on loan)		
1943–1946	Real Murcia		
1946–1948	Reus Deportiu		
1947	→ Badalona (on loan)		
1948–1949	Escoriaza		
1952–1954	AE Prat		
- * Club domestic league appearances and goals

Joaquim Torrent Dalmau (22 June 1917 – 12 September 1971) was a Spanish footballer who played as a midfielder for Espanyol and Real Murcia in the 1940s.

== Career ==
Born on 22 June 1917 in the Catalonian town of Girona, Torrent began his football career when the Spanish Civil War ended in 1939, playing for the Catalan team AE Prat, where he quickly stood out, so two years later, in 1941, he was signed by Espanyol, with whom he played in 10 official matches over two seasons, including four in La Liga. In his second season at Espanyol, he was loaned to Reus Deportiu, and the following year, he returned to the top-flight by joining Real Murcia, where he stayed for three years, from 1943 until 1946. In total, he played 19 La Liga matches for Espanyol and Real Murcia.

After leaving Murcia, Torrent went on to play for Reus Deportiu (1946–48), Badalona (1947), Escoriaza (1948–49), and AE Prat (1952–54).

== Death ==
Torrent died in El Prat de Llobregat on 12 September 1971, at the age of 54.
