= 1950–51 Tercera División =

Tercera División
- Season: 1950–51

The 1950–51 Tercera División was the 15th edition of the Spanish third tier.

== Format ==
100 teams in 6 geographic groups participated this season. The winners and runners up of each group progressed to the Promotion play-offs. They formed two groups of 6 clubs playing each other home and away (10 games each). The winners and runners up of each group were promoted to the Segunda División. Tenerife, although not a Tercera División member were involved in a play-off against the 13th placed side in the South Group of the Segunda División.

== League tables ==
=== Group I ===
Pos	Team	Pld	W	D	L	GF	GA	GD	Pts
1	Atlético de Zamora	30	21	2	7	111	51	+60	44
2	Caudal	30	20	3	7	86	47	+39	43
3	Real Juvencia	30	18	4	8	63	45	+18	40
4	Juvenil	30	17	5	8	73	50	+23	39
5	Cultural Leonesa	30	15	6	9	75	50	+25	36
6	La Felguera	30	12	7	11	51	47	+4	31
7	Ponferradina	30	14	2	14	62	84	−22	30
8	Langreano	30	14	2	14	59	62	−3	30
9	Pontevedra	30	13	3	14	67	67	0	29
10	Real Avilés	30	12	3	15	60	68	−8	27
11	Arosa	30	11	5	14	54	63	−9	26 (Note: 1 point deducted. Arosa fielded an ineligible player in a 1-0 home win against Real Avilés who were awarded the victory.)
12	Arsenal	30	11	2	17	46	64	−18	24
13	Vetusta	30	10	4	16	56	63	−7	24
14	Lemos	30	9	4	17	48	79	−31	22
15	Palencia	30	8	2	20	39	72	−33	17 (Note: 1 point deducted. FN Palencia fielded an ineligible player in a 1-1 draw at Arsenal Ferrol. Arsenal were awarded the victory.)
16	Santiago	30	5	6	19	36	74	−38	16

=== Group II ===
Pos	Team	Pld	W	D	L	GF	GA	GD	Pts
1	Eibar	34	23	6	5	84	45	+39	52
2	Alavés	34	20	7	7	75	31	+44	47
3	Burgos	34	19	9	6	71	42	+29	47
4	Getxo	34	19	7	8	70	38	+32	45
5	Mirandés	34	16	6	12	63	52	+11	38
6	Indautxu	34	16	6	12	68	63	+5	38
7	Izarra	34	16	2	16	75	78	−3	34
8	Sestao	34	14	5	15	58	63	−5	33
9	Calahorra	34	15	3	16	54	63	−9	33
10	Arenas de Getxo	34	14	4	16	70	59	+11	32
11	Naval	34	13	4	17	66	66	0	30
12	Baskonia	34	11	8	15	52	52	0	30
13	Erandio	34	13	4	17	59	63	−4	30
14	Recreación de Logroño	34	13	4	17	61	71	−10	30
15	Juventud de Santander	34	10	8	16	57	76	−19	28
16	Rayo Cantabria	34	8	8	18	59	74	−15	24
17	Real Unión	34	9	4	21	49	91	−42	22
18	Tudelano	34	7	5	22	43	107	−64	19

=== Group III ===
Pos	Team	Pld	W	D	L	GF	GA	GD	Pts
1	Martinenc	32	22	2	8	94	54	+40	46
2	Terrassa	32	19	5	8	82	57	+25	43
3	Atlético Zaragoza	32	19	4	9	99	48	+51	42
4	España Industrial	32	16	8	8	75	52	+23	40
5	Tortosa	32	15	6	11	81	49	+32	36
6	Sants	32	15	5	12	74	75	−1	35
7	Mataró	32	12	9	11	57	54	+3	33
8	Binéfar	32	13	7	12	53	57	−4	33
9	Manresa	32	16	0	16	72	76	−4	32
10	Arenas de Zaragoza	32	13	5	14	65	62	+3	31
11	Igualada	32	11	9	12	56	58	−2	31
12	Escoriaza	32	11	5	16	74	79	−5	27
13	Calatayud	32	10	6	16	52	67	−15	26
14	Granollers	32	9	7	16	55	75	−20	25
15	Júpiter	32	10	5	17	59	91	−32	25
16	Tàrrega	32	7	6	19	43	94	−51	20
17	Reus	32	8	3	21	53	96	−43	19

=== Group IV ===
Pos	Team	Pld	W	D	L	GF	GA	GD	Pts
1	Cacereño	30	15	8	7	70	41	+29	38
2	Guadalajara	30	15	7	8	60	53	+7	37
3	Calvo Sotelo	30	16	4	10	68	58	+10	36
4	Manchego	30	15	5	10	56	45	+11	35
5	Badajoz	30	15	3	12	71	60	+11	33
6	Real Ávila	30	13	6	11	62	50	+12	32
7	Emeritense	30	12	7	11	65	56	+9	31
8	Tomelloso	30	11	9	10	62	53	+9	31
9	Gimnástica Segoviana	30	14	3	13	72	65	+7	31
10	Conquense	30	13	4	13	54	65	−11	30
11	Valdepeñas	30	11	5	14	60	78	−18	27
12	Talavera	30	11	5	14	70	89	−19	27
13	Rayo Vallecano	30	11	3	16	52	59	−7	25
14	Toledo	30	9	6	15	62	54	+8	24
15	Alcalá	30	11	2	17	53	75	−22	24
16	Cuatro Caminos	30	6	7	17	45	81	−36	19

=== Group V ===
Pos	Team	Pld	W	D	L	GF	GA	GD	Pts
1	Atlético Baleares	32	17	9	6	88	35	+53	43
2	Alicante	32	19	5	8	95	59	+36	43
3	Castellón	32	16	8	8	54	38	+16	40
4	Manacor	31	16	7	8	75	38	+37	39
5	Imperial	32	16	3	13	82	64	+18	35
6	Elche	32	14	6	12	65	51	+14	34
7	Orihuela	32	14	5	13	79	60	+19	33
8	Naval	32	14	5	13	59	63	−4	33
9	Catarroja	32	13	7	12	56	64	−8	33
10	Novelda	32	15	2	15	58	71	−13	32
11	San Javier	32	14	3	15	52	52	0	31
12	Villena	32	12	6	14	73	75	−2	30
13	Segarra	32	13	4	15	60	68	−8	30
14	Constància	32	13	3	16	58	68	−10	27 (Note: 2 points deducted for non-appearance away to Orihuela who were awarded the points.)
15	Olímpic de Xàtiva	32	8	9	15	54	72	−18	22 (Note: 3 points deducted. Two for non-appearance away to Constancia, who were awarded the points. One for fielding an ineligible player at home to Novelda with the points awarded to Novelda.)
16	Eldense	31	7	6	18	48	93	−45	20
17	Cieza	32	5	2	25	28	113	−85	10 (Note: 2 points deducted for non-appearance at Segarra who were awarded the points.)

=== Group VI ===
Pos	Team	Pld	W	D	L	GF	GA	GD	Pts
1	Recreativo de Huelva	30	17	7	6	86	41	+45	41
2	Real Betis	30	18	4	8	95	53	+42	40
3	Real Jaén	30	19	2	9	73	43	+30	40
4	Almería	30	16	5	9	57	45	+12	37
5	San Fernando	30	15	4	11	71	56	+15	34
6	Xerez	30	12	8	10	62	49	+13	32
7	Cádiz	30	13	4	13	48	49	−1	30
8	Español de Tetuán	30	14	2	14	51	63	−12	30
9	Iliturgi	30	11	6	13	61	61	0	28
10	Maghreb-el-Aksa	30	12	3	15	54	52	+2	27
11	Utrera	30	11	5	14	52	68	−16	27
12	Atlético Malagueño	30	9	8	13	49	62	−13	26
13	Recreativo de Granada	30	9	6	15	36	69	−33	24
14	España de Tánger	30	8	7	15	49	64	−15	23
15	Algeciras	30	10	2	18	42	71	−29	22
16	Larache	30	8	3	19	34	74	−40	19

== Promotion playoff ==
=== Group I ===
Pos	Team	Pld	W	D	L	GF	GA	GD	Pts
1	Caudal	10	6	1	3	21	19	+2	13
2	Alavés	10	6	1	3	16	16	0	13
3	Atlético de Zamora	10	5	0	5	32	20	+12	10
4	Eibar	10	4	1	5	18	17	+1	9
5	Terrassa	10	4	0	6	18	26	−8	8
6	Martinenc	10	3	1	6	15	22	−7	7

Note: Caudal and Alavés were promoted to the Segunda División.

=== Group II ===
Pos	Team	Pld	W	D	L	GF	GA	GD	Pts
1	Atlético Baleares	10	5	3	2	34	15	+19	13
2	Alicante	10	5	1	4	18	20	−2	11
3	Real Betis	10	5	1	4	23	17	+6	11
4	Recreativo de Huelva	10	4	3	3	20	16	+4	11
5	Cacereño	10	5	1	4	25	22	+3	11
6	Guadalajara	10	1	1	8	10	40	−30	3

Note: Atlético Baleares and Alicante CF were promoted to the Segunda División.

== Relegation playoff ==
=== Group I ===
Pos	Team	Pld	W	D	L	GF	GA	GD	Pts
1	Santiago	8	6	0	2	24	16	+8	12
2	Calzada	8	4	2	2	20	10	+10	10
3	Polvorín	8	4	0	4	15	22	−7	8
4	Hispania Gijonés	8	2	2	4	17	21	−4	6
5	Fabril	8	1	2	5	14	21	−7	4
6	Palencia (Note: Team withdrawn from the competition)	0	0	0	0	0	0	0	0

=== Group II ===
Pos	Team	Pld	W	D	L	GF	GA	GD	Pts
1	Rayo Cantabria	10	6	2	2	17	12	+5	14
2	Portugalete	10	6	1	3	21	13	+8	13
3	Mondragón	10	6	0	4	16	15	+1	12
4	Juventud de Santander	10	4	1	5	18	19	−1	9
5	Peña Sport	10	3	1	6	14	20	−6	7
6	Santoña	10	2	1	7	8	15	−7	5

=== Group III ===
Pos	Team	Pld	W	D	L	GF	GA	GD	Pts
1	Europa	10	7	1	2	30	12	+18	15
2	Tàrrega	10	5	2	3	21	14	+7	12
3	Hernán Cortés	10	5	1	4	31	23	+8	11
4	Vilafranca	10	4	1	5	18	20	−2	9
5	Júpiter	10	2	4	4	15	22	−7	8
6	Celta de Zaragoza	10	2	1	7	13	37	−24	5

=== Group IV ===
Pos	Team	Pld	W	D	L	GF	GA	GD	Pts
1	San Lorenzo	10	7	1	2	28	12	+16	15
2	Cuatro Caminos	10	6	1	3	24	12	+12	13
3	Miguel del Prado	10	5	1	4	11	13	−2	11
4	Villaverde Boetticher	10	4	1	5	17	22	−5	9
5	Alcalá	10	4	1	5	16	22	−6	9
6	Montijo	10	1	1	8	12	27	−15	0 (Note: 3 points deducted)

=== Group V ===
Pos	Team	Pld	W	D	L	GF	GA	GD	Pts
1	Aspense	8	5	1	2	17	15	+2	11
2	Soriano	8	5	0	3	23	18	+5	10
3	Mahón	8	3	1	4	23	19	+4	7
4	Hellín	8	3	1	4	14	14	0	7
5	Eldense	8	2	1	5	14	25	−11	5
6	Olímpic de Xàtiva (Note: Team withdrawn from the competition)	0	0	0	0	0	0	0	0

=== Group VI ===
Pos	Team	Pld	W	D	L	GF	GA	GD	Pts
1	Algeciras	10	6	4	0	31	15	+16	16
2	Larache	10	5	2	3	32	11	+21	12
3	Juventud de Sevilla	10	5	2	3	21	22	−1	12
4	Villa de Nador	10	4	1	5	16	26	−10	9
5	Unión Tangerina	10	3	0	7	14	30	−16	6
6	Puerto Real	10	2	1	7	15	25	−10	4 (Note: 1 point deducted)

== Season records ==
- Most wins: 23, Eibar.
- Most draws: 9, 6 teams.
- Most losses: 25, Cieza.
- Most goals for: 111, Atlético de Zamora.
- Most goals against: 113, Cieza.
- Most points: 52, Eibar.
- Fewest wins: 5, Santiago and Cieza.
- Fewest draws: 0, Manresa.
- Fewest losses: 5, Eibar.
- Fewest goals for: 28, Cieza.
- Fewest goals against: 31, Alavés.
- Fewest points: 10, Cieza.
