= 1955–56 Segunda División =

25th season of the second-tier football league in Spain

Segunda División
- Season: 1955–56
- Champions: Osasuna; Jaén
- Promoted: Osasuna; Jaén; España Industrial; Zaragoza
- Relegated: Plus Ultra
- Matches: 480
- Goals: 1,607 (3.35 per match)
- Top goalscorer: Rafa Delgado (25 goals)
- Best goalkeeper: Pedro Lasheras (0.9 goals/match)
- Biggest home win: Osasuna 7–0 Eibar (22 January 1956)
- Biggest away win: Sestao 2–8 Oviedo (20 November 1955); Real Gijón 0–6 Oviedo (21 February 1956); La Felguera 0–6 Oviedo (1 April 1956)
- Highest scoring: Jaén 8–3 Tenerife (23 October 1955)

The 1955–56 Segunda División season was the 25th since its establishment and was played between 10 September 1955 and 22 April 1956.

== Overview before the season ==
32 teams joined the league, including two relegated from the 1954–55 La Liga and 4 promoted from the 1954–55 Tercera División.

Relegated from La Liga

- Real Santander
- Málaga

Promoted from Tercera División

- Indauchu
- Plus Ultra
- Mestalla
- Cádiz

== Group North ==
=== Teams ===
Location of teams in Segunda División 1955-56 Group North

Club	City	Stadium
Club Baracaldo	Baracaldo	Lasesarre
Caudal Deportivo	Mieres	El Batán
SD Eibar	Eibar	Ipurúa
Club Ferrol	Ferrol	Manuel Rivera
Real Gijón	Gijón	El Molinón
SD Indauchu	Bilbao	Garellano
CP La Felguera	La Felguera, Langreo	La Barraca
UD Lérida	Lérida	Campo de Deportes
CD Logroñés	Logroño	Las Gaunas
CA Osasuna	Pamplona	San Juan
Real Oviedo CF	Oviedo	Buenavista
CD Sabadell FC	Sabadell	Cruz Alta
Real Santander SD	Santander	El Sardinero
Club Sestao	Sestao	Las Llanas
CD Tarrasa	Tarrasa	Obispo Irurita
Real Zaragoza	Zaragoza	Torrero

=== League table ===
Pos	Team	Pld	W	D	L	GF	GA	GD	Pts	Promotion or qualification
1	Osasuna (P)	30	17	8	5	76	33	+43	42	Promotion to La Liga
2	Oviedo	30	18	5	7	78	33	+45	41	Qualification for the promotion playoffs
3	Zaragoza (O, P)	30	18	4	8	57	27	+30	40	Qualification for the promotion playoffs
4	Caudal	30	13	8	9	49	37	+12	34	
5	Sabadell	30	13	7	10	50	44	+6	33	
6	Ferrol	30	11	10	9	44	47	−3	32 (Note: Ferrol finished ahead of Real Gijón on head-to-head points: Ferrol–Real Gijón 2–0, Real Gijón–Ferrol 1–2)	
7	Real Gijón	30	14	4	12	51	46	+5	32	
8	Indauchu	30	12	6	12	53	50	+3	30	
9	Tarrasa	30	10	8	12	46	59	−13	28 (Note: Tarrasa finished ahead of Baracaldo and Real Santander on head-to-head points: Tarrasa 5 pts, Baracaldo 4 pts, Real Santander 3 pts)	
10	Baracaldo	30	10	8	12	45	54	−9	28	
11	Real Santander	30	12	4	14	47	47	0	28	
12	Lérida	30	11	4	15	53	63	−10	26 (Note: Lérida finished ahead of La Felguera on head-to-head points: La Felguera–Lérida 1–3, Lérida–La Felguera 2–1)	
13	La Felguera	30	10	6	14	35	57	−22	26	
14	Eibar	30	9	7	14	40	56	−16	25	
15	Sestao (O)	30	6	7	17	25	57	−32	19	Qualification for the relegation playoffs
16	Logroñés (O)	30	4	8	18	37	76	−39	16	Qualification for the relegation playoffs

Source: BDFútbol
Rules for classification: 1) points; 2) head-to-head points; 3) head-to-head goal difference; 4) goal difference; 5) number of goals scored
(O) Play-off winners; (P) Promoted

=== Results ===
Home \ Away	BAR	CAU	EIB	IND	FEL	LLE	LOG	OSA	OVI	RFE	RAC	SPO	SAB	SES	TRR	ZAR
Baracaldo	—	3–1	2–1	3–2	1–0	3–0	4–1	3–2	0–3	0–2	1–0	2–6	5–0	0–0	1–1	2–2
Caudal	3–1	—	4–0	2–1	3–1	1–0	2–0	1–2	3–2	2–0	4–1	1–2	2–1	4–0	4–1	3–0
Eibar	3–2	1–1	—	0–2	0–0	2–0	5–2	2–2	3–2	4–1	1–2	1–1	2–0	4–1	3–0	0–1
Indauchu	1–0	1–1	1–0	—	2–1	4–2	3–2	2–2	0–2	5–1	5–1	0–0	0–3	3–2	4–2	1–0
La Felguera	1–1	2–1	3–1	1–5	—	1–3	2–1	1–1	0–6	3–0	2–1	2–0	1–1	1–0	1–0	0–2
Lérida	3–1	1–1	3–1	6–2	2–1	—	3–3	2–2	2–1	0–1	4–3	3–0	1–0	1–2	6–2	1–3
Logroñés	1–2	2–0	1–2	1–1	2–2	1–3	—	3–3	1–1	2–1	2–0	1–1	2–4	0–0	1–2	2–1
Osasuna	7–1	2–2	7–0	3–0	3–1	4–0	4–0	—	2–0	0–1	1–0	6–1	5–0	4–0	3–2	2–0
Oviedo	3–1	1–1	3–1	2–1	4–1	4–1	3–1	3–0	—	4–0	3–0	2–4	1–0	2–0	4–0	2–0
Ferrol	1–1	0–0	1–1	4–2	3–1	6–0	0–0	2–2	1–1	—	5–3	2–0	1–1	0–0	2–1	0–0
Real Santander	0–0	2–1	4–0	3–2	0–1	3–0	2–0	1–2	4–2	4–1	—	2–0	0–0	2–0	2–0	0–0
Real Gijón	1–1	4–0	3–0	1–0	2–0	4–3	6–0	0–1	0–6	1–2	2–1	—	3–1	1–0	6–0	1–0
Sabadell	2–1	1–1	3–1	1–1	3–0	3–2	7–1	0–1	1–1	4–1	3–1	1–0	—	1–1	1–3	3–1
Sestao	0–0	0–0	0–0	2–1	1–3	2–0	5–1	2–1	2–8	1–2	0–3	2–0	1–3	—	0–3	0–2
Tarrasa	3–2	2–0	1–1	1–1	1–1	1–1	2–1	2–2	2–2	2–2	5–2	2–0	0–1	3–0	—	2–1
Zaragoza	4–1	3–0	3–0	1–0	7–1	1–0	5–2	1–0	1–0	2–1	0–0	4–1	4–1	4–1	4–0	—

Source: BDFútbol
Legend: Blue = home team win; Yellow = draw; Red = away team win.

=== Top goalscorers ===
Goalscorers	Goals	Team
(Spain) Sabino Andonegui	24	Osasuna
(Spain) Luis Aloy	20	Oviedo
(Spain) Alvarito	17	Ferrol
(Spain) Telmo Zarra	17	Indauchu
(Spain) José Luis Areta	15	Osasuna

=== Top goalkeepers ===
Goalkeeper	Goals	Matches	Average	Team
(Spain) Pedro Lasheras	27	30	0.9	Zaragoza
(Spain) Eusebio Sanz	25	24	1.04	Osasuna
(Spain) Fernando de Argila	28	25	1.12	Oviedo
(Spain) Martín Lobera	36	26	1.38	Real Santander
(Spain) Manuel Sión	42	29	1.45	Real Gijón

== Group South ==
=== Teams ===
Location of teams in Segunda División 1955-56 Group South
Canary Islands

Club	City	Stadium
Atlético Tetuán	Tétouan	Saniat Rmel
CD Badajoz	Badajoz	El Vivero
Real Betis Balompié	Seville	Heliópolis
Cádiz CF	Cádiz	Ramón de Carranza
CD Castellón	Castellón de la Plana	Castalia
UD España de Tánger	Tangier	Stadium Municipal
SD España Industrial	Barcelona	Les Corts
CF Extremadura	Almendralejo	Francisco de la Hera
Granada CF	Granada	Los Cármenes
Real Jaén CF	Jaén	La Victoria
Jerez CD	Jerez de la Frontera	Domecq
CD Málaga	Málaga	La Rosaleda Stadium
CD Mestalla	Valencia	Mestalla
AD Plus Ultra	Madrid	Campo de Ciudad Lineal
CD San Fernando	San Fernando	Marqués de Varela
CD Tenerife	Santa Cruz de Tenerife	Heliodoro Rodríguez López

=== League table ===
Pos	Team	Pld	W	D	L	GF	GA	GD	Pts	Promotion or qualification
1	Jaén (P)	30	18	6	6	64	34	+30	42	Promotion to La Liga
2	Real Betis	30	16	4	10	60	36	+24	36 (Note: Real Betis finished ahead of España Industrial on head-to-head points: Real Betis–España Industrial 3–1, España Industrial–Real Betis 1–1)	Qualification for the promotion playoffs
3	España Industrial (O, P)	30	14	8	8	54	39	+15	36	Qualification for the promotion playoffs
4	Atlético Tetuán (Note: Atlético Tetuán was dissolved at the end of the season after Morocco independence from Spain)	30	15	5	10	60	52	+8	35 (Note: Atlético Tetuán finished ahead of España Tánger on head-to-head points: España Tánger–Atlético Tetuán 1–1, Atlético Tetuán–España Tánger 2–1)	Dissolved
5	España Tánger (Note: España Tánger was dissolved at the end of the season after Morocco independence from Spain)	30	15	5	10	55	44	+11	35	Dissolved
6	Mestalla	30	13	7	10	47	45	+2	33	
7	Extremadura	30	14	4	12	49	44	+5	32	
8	Granada	30	12	5	13	64	57	+7	29 (Note: Granada finished ahead of Tenerife on overall goal difference)	
9	Tenerife	30	11	7	12	48	49	−1	29	
10	Badajoz	30	11	5	14	38	49	−11	27 (Note: Badajoz finished ahead of Málaga on head-to-head points: Badajoz–Málaga 2–0, Málaga–Badajoz 2–2)	
11	Málaga	30	10	7	13	50	44	+6	27	
12	Xerez	30	11	4	15	52	66	−14	26 (Note: Xerez finished ahead of San Fernando on head-to-head goal difference: San Fernando–Xerez 3–2, Xerez–San Fernando 4–2)	
13	San Fernando	30	12	2	16	45	64	−19	26	
14	Cádiz	30	12	1	17	42	66	−24	25	
15	Plus Ultra (R)	30	7	7	16	47	76	−29	21 (Note: Plus Ultra finished ahead of Castellón on head-to-head points: Castellón–Plus Ultra 2–4, Plus Ultra–Castellón 2–2)	Qualification for the relegation playoffs
16	Castellón (O)	30	7	7	16	46	56	−10	21	Qualification for the relegation playoffs

Source: BDFútbol
Rules for classification: 1) points; 2) head-to-head points; 3) head-to-head goal difference; 4) goal difference; 5) number of goals scored
(O) Play-off winners; (P) Promoted; (R) Relegated

=== Results ===
Home \ Away	TET	BAD	CAD	CAS	CON	ESP	EXT	GRA	JAE	CDM	MES	RMC	BET	SFE	TEN	XER
Atlético Tetuán	—	2–1	5–1	5–1	6–3	2–1	1–1	6–0	1–4	2–2	1–0	1–1	2–1	2–0	1–0	4–2
Badajoz	3–1	—	3–0	2–4	4–1	4–2	1–0	1–0	1–0	2–0	2–1	0–0	0–1	0–1	3–2	1–0
Cádiz	2–1	2–1	—	2–3	0–0	0–4	1–0	2–1	1–2	3–2	0–1	6–1	2–0	4–1	2–0	5–2
Castellón	1–3	0–0	4–0	—	1–1	4–1	1–2	1–1	0–1	0–1	0–0	2–4	1–0	4–1	0–0	3–0
España Industrial	1–0	2–0	4–0	3–1	—	1–3	4–0	2–1	2–0	1–0	4–0	3–2	1–1	3–0	1–1	4–0
España Tánger	1–1	1–0	3–0	1–1	1–1	—	3–0	4–2	3–1	1–1	3–1	3–1	3–0	2–0	1–0	2–0
Extremadura	1–4	4–1	1–2	2–1	5–3	3–1	—	3–1	1–3	2–0	2–0	3–0	0–0	3–1	3–0	4–3
Granada	4–0	4–1	2–0	2–1	1–1	2–4	2–1	—	3–3	2–2	4–1	5–1	2–1	3–1	1–0	4–1
Jaén	0–0	5–2	3–0	5–3	1–2	3–0	2–0	2–1	—	2–1	3–0	4–1	1–0	2–0	8–3	0–0
Málaga	0–1	2–2	4–1	3–1	1–2	3–1	1–2	2–1	0–2	—	3–1	4–0	0–2	5–0	2–0	1–1
Mestalla	3–2	3–0	0–1	2–1	3–1	2–0	1–1	2–2	2–1	2–0	—	1–1	4–2	2–1	1–1	6–0
Plus Ultra	5–0	2–2	5–3	2–2	1–1	0–3	0–2	1–5	2–2	1–3	4–1	—	0–2	3–0	4–1	2–1
Real Betis	1–4	5–0	4–1	4–2	3–1	4–0	2–1	3–2	1–1	2–1	0–0	4–0	—	1–2	4–1	5–0
San Fernando	3–1	1–0	3–0	3–1	1–0	2–2	2–1	4–2	2–0	2–2	3–4	3–1	1–3	—	1–4	3–2
Tenerife	4–1	1–1	3–0	2–1	1–0	2–0	0–0	3–2	1–1	2–2	1–2	5–2	3–0	3–1	—	3–1
Xerez	5–0	2–0	3–1	3–1	1–1	3–1	3–1	3–2	1–2	3–2	1–1	4–0	0–4	4–2	3–1	—

Source: BDFútbol
Legend: Blue = home team win; Yellow = draw; Red = away team win.

=== Top goalscorers ===
Goalscorers	Goals	Team
(Spain) Rafa Delgado	25	Granada
(Spain) Eduardo Sobrado	23	Real Betis
(Spain) Adolfo Bolea	20	España Tánger
(Argentina) Julio Corcuera	18	Xerez
(Spain) Botella	16	Real Betis

=== Top goalkeepers ===
Goalkeeper	Goals	Matches	Average	Team
(Spain) Pedro González	27	26	1.04	Real Betis
(Spain) Juan Delgado	27	25	1.08	Jaén
(Spain) Pedro Estrems	31	27	1.15	España Industrial
(Spain) Florentino López	36	25	1.44	Mestalla
(Spain) Martín Rovira	36	25	1.44	Extremadura

== Promotion playoffs ==
=== League table ===
Pos	Team	Pld	W	D	L	GF	GA	GD	Pts	Promotion or relegation
1	España Industrial (O, P)	10	7	1	2	21	15	+6	15	Promotion to La Liga
2	Zaragoza (O, P)	10	5	2	3	18	13	+5	12 (Note: Zaragoza finished ahead of Oviedo on head-to-head points: Oviedo–Zaragoza 0–1, Zaragoza–Oviedo 4–0)	Promotion to La Liga
3	Oviedo	10	6	0	4	23	22	+1	12	
4	Murcia (R)	10	5	1	4	21	18	+3	11	
5	Real Betis	10	2	2	6	21	22	−1	6	
6	Alavés (R)	10	1	2	7	10	24	−14	4	

Source: BDFútbol
Rules for classification: 1) points; 2) head-to-head points; 3) head-to-head goal difference; 4) goal difference; 5) number of goals scored
(O) Play-off winners; (P) Promoted; (R) Relegated

=== Results ===
Home \ Away	ALA	CON	MUR	OVI	BET	ZAR
Alavés	—	2–3	1–0	1–3	1–1	1–2
España Industrial	3–1	—	2–1	6–1	3–2	1–0
Murcia	3–2	1–1	—	4–1	5–1	4–3
Oviedo	2–0	5–0	3–0	—	3–2	0–1
Real Betis	6–0	1–2	0–1	4–5	—	3–1
Zaragoza	1–1	1–0	4–2	4–0	1–1	—

Source: BDFútbol
Legend: Blue = home team win; Yellow = draw; Red = away team win.

== Relegation playoffs ==
=== First leg ===
13 May 1956	Orense	2–1	Sestao	Ourense
	Obeso 66'; Cortizo 71'	Report	Izaola 25'	Stadium: O Couto; Referee: Uría González

13 May 1956	Logroñés	2–0	Manresa	Logroño
	Avelino 49', 73'	Report		Stadium: Las Gaunas; Referee: Gómez Arribas

13 May 1956	Plus Ultra	3–3	Eldense	Madrid
	Santa María 14'; Poyán 34'; Vidal 57'	Report	Amaro 12'; Medina 29', 70'	Stadium: Ciudad Lineal; Referee: Cotanda Arnal

13 May 1956	Castellón	1–1	Algeciras	Castellón de la Plana
	Ramos 28'	Report	Tuhami 60'	Stadium: Castalia; Referee: De la Fuente Alonso

=== Second leg ===
19 May 1956	Sestao	3–0 (4–2 agg.)	Orense	Sestao
	Izaola 37'; Llona 66'; Beascoechea 85'	Report		Stadium: Las Llanas; Referee: González Echeverría

20 May 1956	Eldense	3–0 (6–3 agg.)	Plus Ultra	Elda
	Villaplana 50', 88'; Cedrés 89'	Report		Stadium: Parque; Referee: Simó Fiol

20 May 1956	Manresa	1–0 (1–2 agg.)	Logroñés	Manresa
	Torras 12'	Report		Stadium: El Pujolet; Referee: Mazagatos Vicario

20 May 1956	Algeciras	2–2 (3–3 agg.)	Castellón	Algeciras
	Piera 37'; Antoñito 39'	Report	Mezquita 3'; Vilalta 43'	Stadium: El Mirador; Referee: Díaz Argote

=== Tiebreaker ===
3 June 1956	Castellón	2–1	Algeciras	Madrid
	Colubi 9'; Vilalta 54'	Report	Tapia 7'	Stadium: Metropolitano; Referee: Carbelo Martín
