= 1954–55 Segunda División =

24th season of the second-tier football league in Spain

Segunda División
- Season: 1954–55
- Champions: Cultural Leonesa; Murcia
- Promoted: Cultural Leonesa; Murcia
- Relegated: Avilés; Levante; Juvenil; Linense
- Matches: 480
- Goals: 1,684 (3.51 per match)
- Top goalscorer: Julito (25 goals)
- Best goalkeeper: Candi (0.83 goals/match)
- Biggest home win: Xerez 9–1 Jaén (5 December 1954); Jaén 9–1 Linense (23 January 1955)
- Biggest away win: Caudal 0–5 Cultural Leonesa (17 October 1954)
- Highest scoring: Sabadell 8–2 Badajoz (7 November 1954); Xerez 9–1 Jaén (5 December 1954); Jaén 9–1 Linense (23 January 1955); Murcia 8–2 San Fernando (6 February 1955); Jaén 6–4 España Tánger (10 April 1955)

The 1954–55 Segunda División season was the 24th since its establishment and was played between 11 September 1954 and 10 April 1955.

== Overview before the season ==
32 teams joined the league, including 4 relegated from the 1953–54 La Liga and 7 promoted from the 1953–54 Tercera División.

Relegated from La Liga

- Osasuna
- Jaén
- Oviedo
- Real Gijón

Promoted from Tercera División

- Juvenil
- Sestao
- Tarrasa
- Extremadura
- Levante
- Real Betis
- San Fernando

== Group North ==
=== Teams ===
Location of teams in Segunda División 1954-55 Group North

Club	City	Stadium
Real Avilés CF	Avilés	Las Arobias
Club Baracaldo	Baracaldo	Lasesarre
Caudal Deportivo	Mieres	El Batán
Cultural y Deportiva Leonesa	León	El Ejido
SD Eibar	Eibar	Ipurúa
SD España Industrial	Barcelona	Les Corts
Club Ferrol	Ferrol	Manuel Rivera
Real Gijón	Gijón	El Molinón
CD Juvenil	La Coruña	Riazor
CP La Felguera	La Felguera, Langreo	La Barraca
UD Lérida	Lérida	Campo de Deportes
CD Logroñés	Logroño	Las Gaunas
CA Osasuna	Pamplona	San Juan
Real Oviedo CF	Oviedo	Buenavista
Club Sestao	Sestao	Las Llanas
Real Zaragoza	Zaragoza	Torrero

=== League table ===
Pos	Team	Pld	W	D	L	GF	GA	GD	Pts	Promotion, qualification or relegation
1	Cultural Leonesa (P)	30	18	4	8	68	38	+30	40	Promotion to La Liga
2	Zaragoza	30	18	3	9	69	41	+28	39 (Note: Zaragoza finished ahead of Oviedo on number of goals scored)	Qualification for the promotion playoffs
3	Oviedo	30	18	3	9	61	33	+28	39	Qualification for the promotion playoffs
4	Real Gijón	30	15	8	7	50	34	+16	38	
5	Logroñés	30	15	6	9	52	43	+9	36	
6	Baracaldo	30	15	3	12	47	42	+5	33	
7	La Felguera	30	11	8	11	41	45	−4	30	
8	Eibar	30	13	3	14	54	51	+3	29 (Note: Eibar finished ahead of Osasuna on head-to-head points: Eibar–Osasuna 3–0, Osasuna–Eibar 2–2)	
9	Osasuna	30	12	5	13	56	57	−1	29	
10	Lérida	30	10	7	13	41	56	−15	27	
11	España Industrial	30	9	8	13	46	45	+1	26	
12	Racing Ferrol	30	9	6	15	35	59	−24	24 (Note: Racing Ferrol finished ahead of Caudal on head-to-head points: Caudal–Racing Ferrol 0–1, Racing Ferrol–Caudal 3–1)	
13	Caudal	30	8	8	14	49	59	−10	24	
14	Sestao	30	8	7	15	45	56	−11	23 (Note: Sestao finished ahead of Avilés on head-to-head points: Sestao–Avilés 3–0, Avilés–Sestao 1–1)	
15	Avilés (R)	30	10	3	17	50	60	−10	23	Relegation to Tercera División
16	Juvenil (R)	30	5	10	15	40	85	−45	20	Relegation to Tercera División

Source: BDFútbol
Rules for classification: 1) points; 2) head-to-head points; 3) head-to-head goal difference; 4) goal difference; 5) number of goals scored
(P) Promoted; (R) Relegated

=== Results ===
Home \ Away	AVI	BAR	CAU	LEO	EIB	CON	JUV	FEL	LLE	LOG	OSA	OVI	RFE	SPO	SES	ZAR
Avilés	—	1–3	2–0	2–0	4–0	1–0	5–3	4–1	0–0	1–4	4–0	1–2	1–3	3–0	1–1	4–2
Baracaldo	0–1	—	4–1	4–0	4–0	2–1	5–0	2–0	2–3	1–0	1–0	2–1	3–2	1–0	2–3	0–2
Caudal	4–2	3–0	—	0–5	4–0	2–3	4–0	2–3	4–1	5–1	5–1	0–0	0–1	1–5	2–1	0–0
Cultural Leonesa	3–2	1–1	5–2	—	4–0	6–1	4–1	3–0	5–2	1–0	2–0	2–0	4–0	1–0	1–0	5–1
Eibar	5–1	1–1	4–1	4–0	—	3–1	6–3	1–1	4–1	0–1	3–0	3–1	3–0	3–1	0–1	1–2
España Industrial	1–0	0–0	0–0	2–1	4–0	—	5–1	1–3	1–1	4–0	3–3	2–3	4–1	4–2	0–0	1–2
Juvenil	4–3	1–2	1–1	2–4	0–1	1–1	—	1–1	3–0	2–2	3–2	2–1	1–1	1–1	1–1	3–2
La Felguera	4–2	4–0	2–0	1–1	1–0	2–1	1–1	—	5–1	1–1	1–0	0–2	0–0	0–1	3–0	2–1
Lérida	3–2	2–0	1–1	0–0	2–0	1–4	3–1	2–0	—	1–1	4–1	1–2	3–0	0–0	4–0	0–2
Logroñés	0–0	3–1	4–1	2–1	1–3	2–0	3–1	3–1	2–1	—	1–1	2–1	6–1	3–1	3–2	2–1
Osasuna	5–1	3–2	3–3	4–1	2–2	1–0	7–1	2–1	5–1	1–0	—	1–2	4–3	2–1	4–0	3–1
Oviedo	1–0	4–0	3–0	3–1	2–1	0–0	5–0	4–0	2–0	5–1	0–0	—	3–2	1–2	4–0	3–0
Racing Ferrol	1–0	0–1	3–1	1–0	3–2	2–0	0–0	0–0	1–1	0–2	2–0	0–3	—	1–1	3–2	1–4
Real Gijón	1–0	2–0	1–1	0–0	2–1	2–1	2–2	1–1	3–0	2–0	3–0	4–3	3–1	—	5–2	1–0
Sestao	3–0	1–2	1–1	1–3	0–3	1–1	6–0	4–1	1–2	1–1	4–0	3–0	3–1	0–2	—	1–1
Zaragoza	6–2	2–1	2–0	2–4	3–0	2–0	6–0	4–1	4–0	2–1	2–1	3–0	4–1	1–1	5–2	—

Source: BDFútbol
Legend: Blue = home team win; Yellow = draw; Red = away team win.

=== Top goalscorers ===
Goalscorers	Goals	Team
(Spain) Avelino Chaves	21	Zaragoza
(Spain) José Antonio Ucelay	18	Zaragoza
(Spain) José Duró	18	Oviedo
(Spain) Sabino Andonegui	18	Osasuna
(Spain) Luis Aloy	16	Oviedo

=== Top goalkeepers ===
Goalkeeper	Goals	Matches	Average	Team
(Spain) Manuel Sión	31	29	1.07	Real Gijón
(Spain) Fernando de Argila	30	27	1.11	Oviedo
(Spain) Amaro Méndez	34	29	1.17	Cultural Leonesa
(Spain) Francisco Urquiola	29	23	1.26	Baracaldo
(Spain) Pedro Lasheras	34	26	1.31	Zaragoza

== Group South ==
=== Teams ===
Location of teams in Segunda División 1954-55 Group South
Canary Islands

Club	City	Stadium
Atlético Tetuán	Tétouan	Saniat Rmel
CD Badajoz	Badajoz	El Vivero
Real Betis Balompié	Seville	Heliópolis
CD Castellón	Castellón de la Plana	Castalia
UD España Tánger	Tangier	Stadium Municipal
CF Extremadura	Almendralejo	Francisco de la Hera
Granada CF	Granada	Los Cármenes
Real Jaén CF	Jaén	La Victoria
Jerez CD	Jerez de la Frontera	Domecq
Levante UD	Valencia	Vallejo
RB Linense	La Línea de la Concepción	San Bernardo
Real Murcia	Murcia	La Condomina
CD Sabadell FC	Sabadell	Cruz Alta
CD San Fernando	San Fernando	Marqués de Varela
CD Tarrasa	Tarrasa	Obispo Irurita
CD Tenerife	Santa Cruz de Tenerife	Heliodoro Rodríguez López

=== League table ===
Pos	Team	Pld	W	D	L	GF	GA	GD	Pts	Promotion, qualification or relegation
1	Murcia (P)	30	19	2	9	83	39	+44	40	Promotion to La Liga
2	Atlético Tetuán	30	16	7	7	56	33	+23	39	Qualification for the promotion playoffs
3	Granada	30	17	4	9	54	25	+29	38	Qualification for the promotion playoffs
4	España Tánger	30	15	7	8	56	47	+9	37	
5	Real Betis	30	14	6	10	48	47	+1	34	
6	Xerez	30	13	6	11	60	49	+11	32 (Note: Xerez finished ahead of Jaén on head-to-head goal difference: Xerez–Jaén 9–1, Jaén–Xerez 4–1)	
7	Jaén	30	12	8	10	69	58	+11	32	
8	Badajoz	30	14	3	13	51	60	−9	31	
9	Tenerife	30	14	1	15	51	47	+4	29	
10	Sabadell	30	11	6	13	51	54	−3	28 (Note: Sabadell finished ahead of Extremadura on head-to-head goal difference: Sabadell–Extremadura 3–0, Extremadura–Sabadell 2–0)	
11	Extremadura	30	12	4	14	54	69	−15	28	
12	Castellón	30	12	3	15	50	57	−7	27	
13	San Fernando	30	10	6	14	57	69	−12	26	
14	Tarrasa	30	11	3	16	52	64	−12	25	
15	Levante (R)	30	8	3	19	51	65	−14	19	Relegation to Tercera División
16	Linense (R)	30	6	3	21	37	97	−60	15	Relegation to Tercera División

Source: BDFútbol
Rules for classification: 1) points; 2) head-to-head points; 3) head-to-head goal difference; 4) goal difference; 5) number of goals scored
(P) Promoted; (R) Relegated

=== Results ===
Home \ Away	TET	BAD	CAS	ESP	EXT	GRA	JAE	LEV	LNS	MUR	BET	SAB	SFE	TEN	TRR	XER
Atlético Tetuán	—	4–1	2–1	0–0	6–0	0–0	3–2	2–1	3–0	2–1	3–4	2–1	3–0	4–0	6–2	1–1
Badajoz	1–0	—	3–0	1–1	0–1	0–0	3–1	2–1	5–1	3–0	1–0	5–0	1–0	3–2	4–1	2–1
Castellón	0–1	1–1	—	3–3	4–3	1–0	5–0	1–0	2–0	2–0	4–0	4–0	5–1	2–1	2–1	2–2
España Tánger	0–0	5–1	1–0	—	7–0	1–0	2–2	4–2	1–1	3–0	3–1	2–0	3–1	2–0	2–1	3–1
Extremadura	0–2	2–0	3–2	8–1	—	3–2	2–1	5–2	6–1	1–1	0–0	2–0	1–0	2–0	4–2	1–1
Granada	0–1	1–0	1–0	2–0	4–1	—	3–1	4–0	3–1	3–1	3–1	4–1	4–0	3–0	3–1	1–0
Jaén	4–0	3–1	5–1	6–4	2–0	0–0	—	5–1	9–1	3–1	1–1	1–1	3–3	3–1	0–0	4–1
Levante	2–2	5–1	1–2	1–1	6–1	2–3	2–0	—	3–0	1–3	1–4	2–1	3–4	1–2	6–1	1–0
Linense	1–3	2–4	2–1	2–1	3–3	0–4	2–5	2–0	—	1–1	0–1	4–0	3–2	1–5	3–0	1–2
Murcia	3–0	6–1	5–1	3–0	4–0	3–2	1–2	5–0	8–1	—	4–1	3–0	8–2	4–0	4–1	3–1
Real Betis	2–1	2–0	2–1	0–1	1–0	3–1	1–1	1–0	5–0	1–3	—	3–2	0–0	2–0	4–1	3–1
Sabadell	2–2	8–2	5–1	0–2	3–0	0–0	3–0	1–1	2–0	3–1	4–0	—	3–2	4–1	1–0	2–0
San Fernando	1–1	2–1	2–0	4–0	3–2	0–3	3–3	3–1	6–1	1–3	2–2	5–1	—	3–1	4–0	1–1
Tenerife	0–1	1–2	4–0	3–0	3–0	2–0	1–0	1–0	2–1	2–0	5–2	1–1	4–0	—	2–0	6–0
Tarrasa	2–1	6–1	4–1	2–0	5–2	1–0	2–1	1–3	5–0	1–2	1–1	3–1	3–1	3–0	—	1–1
Xerez	1–0	3–1	4–1	2–3	3–1	1–0	9–1	3–2	5–2	0–2	3–0	1–1	5–1	3–1	4–1	—

Source: BDFútbol
Legend: Blue = home team win; Yellow = draw; Red = away team win.

=== Top goalscorers ===
Goalscorers	Goals	Team
(Spain) Julito	25	Tenerife
(Spain) Heliodoro Castaño	23	España Tánger
(Spain) José Gallardo	22	Murcia
(Spain) Ángel Arregui	17	Jaén
(Spain) Manuel Domínguez	16	Extremadura

=== Top goalkeepers ===
Goalkeeper	Goals	Matches	Average	Team
(Spain) Candi	25	30	0.83	Granada
(Spain) Goyo	32	28	1.14	Atlético Tetuán
(Spain) José Luis Echezarreta	34	25	1.36	Murcia
(Spain) Pedro González	41	27	1.52	Real Betis
(Spain) Bienvenido Primo	46	28	1.64	Castellón

== Promotion playoffs ==
=== League table ===
Pos	Team	Pld	W	D	L	GF	GA	GD	Pts	Promotion or relegation
1	Español (O)	10	7	1	2	17	8	+9	15	Remained at La Liga
2	Real Sociedad (O)	10	6	1	3	20	14	+6	13	Remained at La Liga
3	Oviedo	10	5	1	4	22	20	+2	11	
4	Atlético Tetuán	10	4	2	4	17	15	+2	10	
5	Zaragoza	10	3	0	7	13	17	−4	6	
6	Granada	10	2	1	7	13	28	−15	5	

Source: BDFútbol
Rules for classification: 1) points; 2) head-to-head points; 3) head-to-head goal difference; 4) goal difference; 5) number of goals scored
(O) Play-off winners

=== Results ===
Home \ Away	TET	ESP	GRA	OVI	RSO	ZAR
Atlético Tetuán	—	1–2	4–0	2–3	2–2	2–0
Español	4–1	—	0–0	1–0	1–2	1–0
Granada	3–1	1–3	—	2–3	1–2	3–1
Oviedo	0–0	1–3	6–2	—	1–0	6–0
Real Sociedad	1–2	2–1	6–1	3–2	—	0–2
Zaragoza	0–2	0–1	2–0	7–0	1–2	—

Source: BDFútbol
Legend: Blue = home team win; Yellow = draw; Red = away team win.
