= Javier Berasaluce =

Spanish footballer (1931–2022)

Personal information
- Full name: Javier Berasaluce Marquiegui
- Date of birth: 4 January 1931
- Place of birth: Deba, Gipuzkoa, Spain
- Date of death: 8 February 2022 (aged 91)
- Height: 1.75 m (5 ft 9 in)
- Position: Goalkeeper

Senior career*
Years	Team	Apps	(Gls)
1951–1955	Alavés	101	(0)
1955–1960	Real Madrid	19	(0)
1960–1963	Racing de Santander	33	(0)
Total		153	(0)
- * Club domestic league appearances and goals

Javier Berasaluce Marquiegui (4 January 1931 – 8 February 2022) was a Spanish footballer who played as a goalkeeper. He played in La Liga with Deportivo Alavés, Real Madrid and Racing de Santander. He died on 8 February 2022, at the age of 91.

== Career ==
Berasaluce began playing football as a right winger while studying at the Salesianos de Deusto in Bilbao. After his club's regular goalkeeper was injured, Berasaluce began playing goalkeeper. He played football for his hometown club Amaikak Bat, before turning professional.

Berasaluce began his professional career with Deportivo Alavés, helping the club win the 1953–54 Segunda División and earn promotion to La Liga. He also was part of the Real Madrid squad that won five European Cups and La Liga twice.
