= Jaco Azafrani =

Moroccan footballer (1932–2022)

Jaco
Personal information
- Full name: Jacob Azafrani Beliti
- Date of birth: 24 July 1932
- Place of birth: Larache, Spanish protectorate in Morocco
- Date of death: 16 January 2022 (aged 89)
- Place of death: Ceuta, Spain
- Position: Defender

Youth career
- Larache
- –1951: Atlético Tetuán

Senior career*
Years	Team	Apps	(Gls)
1951–1952	Atlético Tetuán	11	(1)
1953–1955	España	59	(1)
1955–1957	Las Palmas	29	(0)
1957–1958	Granada	11	(0)
1958–1959	Rayo Vallecano	17	(1)
1959–1960	Racing Ferrol	12	(0)
1960–1961	Limoges		
Total		139	(3)

Managerial career
- 1971–1972: Albacete
- 1972–1973: Maccabi Jaffa
- 1973–1975: Linense
- 1975–1976: San Fernando
- 1976–1977: Ceuta
- 1977: Jaén
- 1978–1979: Ceuta
- 1980: Algeciras
- 1981: Cacereño
- 1981: Melilla
- 1982–1983: Linense
- 1984–1986: Ceuta
- 1993–1994: Ceuta Atlético
- 2001–2002: Ceuta
- 2007: Atlético Ceuta
- * Club domestic league appearances and goals

Jacob Azafrani Beliti (24 July 1932 – 16 January 2022), commonly known as Jaco, was a Spanish footballer who played as a defender. He died in Ceuta on 16 January 2022, at the age of 89.
