= CD Juvenil =

Spanish football club

Juvenil
- Full name: Club Deportivo Juvenil
- Founded: 1940; 85 years ago
- Dissolved: 1963; 62 years ago
- Ground: Riazor, A Coruña, Galicia, Spain
- Capacity: 32,912
Home colours

Club Deportivo Juvenil was a Spanish football club based in A Coruña, in the autonomous community of Galicia.

== History ==
Founded in 1940 by former Deportivo de La Coruña player Rodrigo García Vizoso as Club Deportivo Aprendices de la Fábrica de Armas, the club changed its name to Club Deportivo Juvenil in 1945 and started to play in Tercera División in the following year.

After eight seasons in Tercera, Juvenil achieved promotion to Segunda División in 1954. It suffered immediate relegation, and after another drop followed in 1960, the club stopped to appear in any competitions in 1961 and subsequently folded in 1963, after merging with Fabril SD and becoming Deportivo's reserve team.

== Season to season ==
Season	Tier	Division	Place	Copa del Rey
1945–46	4	Serie A	1st	
1946–47	3	3ª	3rd	
1947–48	3	3ª	7th	Third round
1948–49	3	3ª	10th	Second round
1949–50	3	3ª	4th	
1950–51	3	3ª	4th	
1951–52	3	3ª	15th	
1952–53	3	3ª	5th	

Season	Tier	Division	Place	Copa del Rey
1953–54	3	3ª	1st	
1954–55	2	2ª	16th	
1955–56	3	3ª	4th	
1956–57	3	3ª	7th	
1957–58	3	3ª	6th	
1958–59	3	3ª	4th	
1959–60	3	3ª	15th	
1960–61	4	Serie A	1st	

- 1 season in Segunda División
- 12 seasons in Tercera División
