= Avelino Chaves =

Spanish footballer (1931–2021)

Personal information
- Full name: Avelino Chaves Couto
- Date of birth: 26 January 1931
- Place of birth: Verín, Spain
- Date of death: 10 January 2021 (aged 89)
- Place of death: Zaragoza, Spain
- Position: Forward

Senior career*
Years	Team	Apps	(Gls)
1948–1950	Valladolid	12	(5)
1950–1952	Granada	31	(18)
1952–1958	Zaragoza	74	(39)
Total		117	(62)
- * Club domestic league appearances and goals

Avelino Chaves Couto (26 January 1931 – 10 January 2021) was a Spanish professional footballer who played as a forward.

== Career ==
Born in Verín, Chaves played for Valladolid, Granada and Zaragoza. He was the top scorer in the Segunda División during the 1954–55 season. He retired from playing in 1958, having suffered a knee injury in 1956.

He worked at Zaragoza after retiring from playing, working as their 'sporting director' until 1996, spending a total of 44 years with the club.
