= José Cantón =

Spanish footballer

Personal information
- Full name: José Cantón Landazuri
- Date of birth: 23 March 1937
- Place of birth: Basauri, Spain
- Date of death: 13 November 2013 (aged 76)
- Place of death: San Fernando, Spain
- Position: Forward

Youth career
- Basauri B.E.A.

Senior career*
Years	Team	Apps	(Gls)
1956–1958	Basconia	31	(5)
1958–1960	Racing Santander	17	(4)
1960–1964	San Fernando	95	(32)
1964–1965	Reus		
1965–1966	Gimnàstic	?	(24)
1966–1967	Cádiz	8	(2)
1967–1974	San Fernando		
- * Club domestic league appearances and goals

José Cantón Landazuri (23 March 1937 – 13 November 2013) was a Spanish professional footballer who played as a forward.

== Club career ==
Born in Basauri, Biscay, Cantón played for CD Basconia, Racing de Santander, CD San Fernando (two spells), CF Reus Deportiu, Gimnàstic de Tarragona and Cádiz CF during an 18-year senior career. He played in Segunda División with the second, third and last clubs, competing with the remaining in the lower leagues.

== Later life and death ==
Cantón worked as a manager after retiring, exclusively at amateur level, He died on 13 November 2013 in San Fernando, Cádiz, at the age of 76.
