= SD Escoriaza =

Escoriaza
- Full name: Sociedad Deportiva Escoriaza
- Founded: 1921
- Dissolved: 1954
- Ground: Las Delicias, Zaragoza, Aragon, Spain
- Capacity: 5,413
Home colours

Sociedad Deportiva Escoriaza was a Spanish football club based in Zaragoza, in the autonomous community of Aragon.

== History ==
Founded in 1921, the club was inscribed in the Royal Spanish Football Federation in 1929, playing in the regional leagues until 1932. After years of inactivity, it returned to action in 1940, reaching the Tercera División only four years later.

Escoriaza reached the Segunda División for the 1953–54 season, but finished last in its group and was immediately relegated back. After the club's owning company, Material Móvil y Construcciones, S.A., was absorbed, the club was dissolved.

== Season to season ==
Season	Tier	Division	Place	Copa del Rey
1929–30	6	3ª Reg.		
1930–31	6	3ª Reg.	1st	
1931–32	5	2ª Reg.		
1932–1940	DNP			
1940–41	5	2ª Reg.	1st	
1941–42	3	1ª Reg.	2nd	
1942–43	3	1ª Reg.	2nd	
1943–44	4	1ª Reg.	1st	First round
1944–45	3	3ª	8th	

Season	Tier	Division	Place	Copa del Rey
1945–46	3	3ª	4th	
1946–47	3	3ª	8th	
1947–48	3	3ª	3rd	First round
1948–49	3	3ª	8th	Second round
1949–50	3	3ª	9th	
1950–51	3	3ª	4th	
1951–52	3	3ª	4th	
1952–53	3	3ª	1st	
1953–54	2	2ª	16th	First round

- 1 season in Segunda División
- 9 seasons in Tercera División
