= UD España =

España de Tánger
- Full name: Unión Deportiva España de Tánger
- Founded: 1936
- Dissolved: 1956
- Ground: El Marchán
- Capacity: 15,000
- 1955–56: Segunda División Group II, 4th
Home colours	Away colours

Union Deportiva de Tánger, also known as Unión Deportiva España de Tánger, was a football club based in Tangier during its Spanish protectorate.

== History ==
The La Unión Deportiva España de Tánger UDET in Spanish, or Unión Deportiva de Tánger UDT, also known as 'España de Tánger', was a Spanish football club founded in Tangier. The Unión Deportiva España de Tánger was one of the teams in the Spanish Second Division during the 1950s.

Until Moroccan independence, football competition in the Spanish protectorate (to which only Tangier belonged between 1940 and 1945) was run by the Spanish Football League. In Morocco there were other teams of Spanish origin, such as the Unión Deportiva Sevillana, the Unión Tangerina, the Fútbol Club Iberia or the Club Atlético Tetuán.

In 1956, after the independence of Morocco, the club merged with Algeciras CF to form España de Algeciras CF before switching back to Algeciras CF in the following year.

== Season to season ==
Season	Tier	Division	Place	Copa del Generalísimo
1947–48	4	1ª Reg.	1st	
1948–49	3	3ª	9th	First round
1949–50	3	3ª	15th	
1950–51	3	3ª	14th	
1951–52	3	3ª	7th	
1952–53	3	3ª	2nd	
1953–54	2	2ª	8th	
1954–55	2	2ª	4th	
1955–56	2	2ª	5th	

- 3 seasons in Segunda División
- 5 seasons in Tercera División

== Former players ==
- (Spain) Adolfo Bolea
- (Spain) Heliodoro Castaño
- (Spain) Jaco Azafrani

== See also ==
- Algeciras CF
- Real Federación de Fútbol de Ceuta
- EHA Tánger
