= CD San Fernando =

Spanish football team

San Fernando
- Full name: Club Deportivo San Fernando
- Founded: 1940
- Dissolved: 2009
- Ground: Bahía Sur, San Fernando, Andalusia, Spain
- Capacity: 12,000
- 2008–09: 2ªB – Group 4, 17th
Home colours	Away colours

Club Deportivo San Fernando was a Spanish football team based in San Fernando, Cádiz, in the autonomous community of Andalusia. Founded in 1940 it was dissolved on 16 June 2009, due a €2 million debt. The club's home ground was Estadio Bahía Sur, with a capacity of 12,000 seats.

== History ==
CD San Fernando was founded by a Cantabrian immigrant, after a merger of three teams from the city: San Fernando FC, Atlético San Fernando and CD Arsenal. During the 1960s, it became one of Andalusia's most important clubs, going on to play ten straight seasons in Segunda División the first being 1954–55 after dispatching Real Murcia in the playoffs: in 1957–58 it finished a best-ever sixth, only two points behind second-placed CD Tenerife, leaving the category with a total of 426 goals scored.

After years of competing mainly in Tercera División – in 1977 Segunda División B was created as the new third division – San Fernando was dissolved in 2009. As with most clubs that disappear due to financial difficulties, a new club emerged from the ashes, being named San Fernando CD.

== Season to season ==
Season	Tier	Division	Place	Copa del Rey
1944–45	4	1ª Reg.	2nd	
1945–46	4	1ª Reg.		
1946–47	3	3ª	5th	
1947–48	3	3ª	11th	Second round
1948–49	4	1ª Reg.	2nd	
1949–50	3	3ª	6th	
1950–51	3	3ª	5th	
1951–52	3	3ª	9th	
1952–53	3	3ª	11th	
1953–54	3	3ª	2nd	
1954–55	2	2ª	13th	
1955–56	2	2ª	13th	
1956–57	2	2ª	14th	
1957–58	2	2ª	6th	
1958–59	2	2ª	12th	Preliminary
1959–60	2	2ª	9th	Round of 32
1960–61	2	2ª	11th	Round of 32
1961–62	2	2ª	14th	First round
1962–63	2	2ª	12th	Round of 32
1963–64	2	2ª	15th	Preliminary

Season	Tier	Division	Place	Copa del Rey
1964–65	3	3ª	8th	
1965–66	3	3ª	4th	
1966–67	3	3ª	7th	
1967–68	3	3ª	5th	
1968–69	3	3ª	11th	
1969–70	3	3ª	12th	First round
1970–71	4	1ª Reg.	2nd	
1971–72	4	1ª Reg.	2nd	
1972–73	3	3ª	13th	First round
1973–74	3	3ª	4th	First round
1974–75	3	3ª	7th	First round
1975–76	3	3ª	3rd	First round
1976–77	3	3ª	13th	First round
1977–78	4	3ª	2nd	Fourth round
1978–79	4	3ª	1st	First round
1979–80	3	2ª B	8th	First round
1980–81	3	2ª B	17th	Second round
1981–82	3	2ª B	12th	
1982–83	3	2ª B	19th	
1983–84	5	Reg. Pref.	1st	

Season	Tier	Division	Place	Copa del Rey
1984–85	4	3ª	19th	
1985–86	4	3ª	8th	
1986–87	4	3ª	11th	
1987–88	4	3ª	2nd	
1988–89	4	3ª	9th	
1989–90	4	3ª	6th	
1990–91	4	3ª	11th	Second round
1991–92	4	3ª	18th	
1992–93	4	3ª	3rd	
1993–94	4	3ª	3rd	
1994–95	3	2ª B	17th	Second round
1995–96	4	3ª	1st	
1996–97	4	3ª	7th	

Season	Tier	Division	Place	Copa del Rey
1997–98	4	3ª	2nd	
1998–99	4	3ª	4th	
1999–2000	4	3ª	2nd	
2000–01	3	2ª B	12th	
2001–02	3	2ª B	19th	
2002–03	4	3ª	13th	
2003–04	4	3ª	4th	
2004–05	4	3ª	7th	
2005–06	4	3ª	2nd	
2006–07	4	3ª	4th	
2007–08	4	3ª	1st	
2008–09	3	2ª B	17th	First round

- 10 seasons in Segunda División
- 8 seasons in Segunda División B
- 41 seasons in Tercera División

== Last squad (2008–09) ==
Note: Flags indicate national team as defined under FIFA eligibility rules; some limited exceptions apply. Players may hold more than one non-FIFA nationality.

No.	Pos.	Nation	Player
1	GK	ESP	Raúl Iglesias
2	DF	ESP	Germán
3	DF	ESP	Juanje
5	DF	ARG	Wicha
6	DF	ESP	Merino
7	FW	ESP	Iván Guerrero
8	MF	ESP	Marco
9	FW	ESP	Quini
10	MF	ESP	Canito
11	FW	ESP	Puli
13	GK	ESP	Jesús

No.	Pos.	Nation	Player
14	MF	ESP	Porto
15	MF	BRA	Marchiori
16	DF	ESP	Selu
17	MF	ESP	Regino
18	MF	ESP	Javi Casares
19	FW	CMR	Lionnel Franck
20	MF	ESP	Casabella
21	MF	ESP	Gato
25	GK	ESP	Lorente
26	MF	ESP	Pedrito
--	GK	ESP	Sergio (injured)

== Famous players ==
- (Argentina) Marcelo Trobbiani
- (Spain) José Cantón
- (Spain) Miguel Llera
- (Spain) Enrique Montero
- (Spain) Antoni Ramallets
