= Pepín (footballer, born 1931) =

Spanish footballer

Personal information
- Full name: José Casas Gris
- Date of birth: 16 November 1931
- Place of birth: Valencia, Spain
- Date of death: 12 October 2010 (aged 78)
- Place of death: Las Palmas, Spain
- Height: 1.68 m (5 ft 6 in)
- Position: Goalkeeper

Youth career
- Discóbolo
- Sorolla

Senior career*
| Years | Team | Apps | (Gls) |
| 1948–1949 | Discóbolo | | |
| 1949–1951 | Alzira | | |
| 1951 | Alicante | 16 | (0) |
| 1952–1960 | Las Palmas | 233 | (0) |
| 1960–1965 | Betis | 78 | (0) |
| 1965–1967 | Las Palmas | 6 | (0) |

International career
| 1963 | Spain | 2 | (0) |
- * Club domestic league appearances and goals

José Casas Gris (16 November 1931 – 12 October 2010), known as Pepín, was a Spanish footballer who played as a goalkeeper.

== Club career ==
Pepín was born in Valencia. After playing with several clubs in the Valencian Community as a youth – starting his senior career at UD Alzira and Alicante CF – he joined UD Las Palmas of La Liga in January 1952, making his competition debut during that season and appearing in 14 games as his side finished second from the bottom.

The Canarians returned to the top division in 1954, and Pepín continued to be first choice until his departure to Real Betis six years later, as Las Palmas were again relegated. He remained five years in Andalusia, only managing to start in two and subsequently returning to his previous club, retiring in 1967 at the age of 35.

Pepín died in the Doctor Negrín Hospital in Las Palmas on 12 October 2010, one month shy of his 79th birthday. Over 14 seasons in the top tier, he took part in 259 matches.

== International career ==
Short for his position, Pepín played twice for Spain, his debut coming on 3 October 1963 in a 1964 European Nations' Cup match against Northern Ireland at Windsor Park, his displays in the 1–0 victory (2–1 on aggregate) earning him the nickname The hero of Belfast; the national team eventually qualified for the finals which were held on home soil, going on to win the tournament.

Pepín earned his second and last cap on 1 December 1963, appearing in a friendly with Belgium in his hometown of Valencia.
