= 1959–60 Segunda División =

29th season of the second-tier football league in Spain

Segunda División
- Season: 1959–60
- Champions: Real Santander; Mallorca
- Promoted: Real Santander; Mallorca
- Relegated: Alavés; Recreativo; Avilés; Atlético Almería; Ferrol; Badajoz
- Matches: 480
- Goals: 1,508 (3.14 per match)
- Top goalscorer: José Paredes (25 goals)
- Best goalkeeper: Ricardo Zamora (0.67 goals/match)
- Biggest home win: Sabadell 7–0 Alavés (25 October 1959); Mestalla 7–0 Recreativo (26 December 1959)
- Biggest away win: Baracaldo 0–4 Real Gijón (20 March 1960)
- Highest scoring: Indauchu 7–4 Ourense (6 December 1959)

The 1959–60 Segunda División season was the 29th since its establishment and was played between 12 September 1959 and 17 April 1960.

== Overview before the season ==
32 teams joined the league, including two relegated from the 1958–59 La Liga and 5 promoted from the 1958–59 Tercera División.

Relegated from La Liga

- Real Gijón
- Celta Vigo

Promoted from Tercera División

- Ourense
- Mallorca
- Recreativo
- Cultural Leonesa
- Mestalla

== Group North ==
=== Teams ===
Location of teams in Segunda División 1959-60 Group North

Club	City	Stadium
Deportivo Alavés	Vitoria	Mendizorroza
Real Avilés CF	Avilés	La Exposición
Baracaldo Altos Hornos	Baracaldo	Lasesarre
CD Basconia	Basauri	Pedro López Cortázar
RC Celta de Vigo	Vigo	Balaídos
CD Comtal	Barcelona	Les Corts
Cultural y Deportiva Leonesa	León	La Puentecilla
RC Deportivo La Coruña	La Coruña	Riazor
Club Ferrol	Ferrol	Manuel Rivera
Real Gijón CF	Gijón	El Molinón
SD Indauchu	Bilbao	Garellano
CD Orense	Orense	José Antonio
CD Sabadell FC	Sabadell	Creu alta
Real Santander SD	Santander	El Sardinero
Club Sestao	Sestao	Las Llanas
CD Terrassa	Terrassa	Obispo Irurita

=== League table ===
Pos	Team	Pld	W	D	L	GF	GA	GD	Pts	Promotion, qualification or relegation
1	Real Santander (P)	30	17	8	5	63	28	+35	42	Promotion to La Liga
2	Celta Vigo	30	18	4	8	63	37	+26	40	Qualification for the promotion playoffs
3	Ourense	30	15	7	8	56	41	+15	37	
4	Deportivo La Coruña	30	16	3	11	56	47	+9	35	
5	Real Gijón	30	14	4	12	56	44	+12	32	
6	Terrassa	30	12	7	11	47	44	+3	31 (Note: Terrassa finished ahead of Sabadell on head-to-head points: Terrassa–Sabadell 1–0, Sabadell–Terrassa 2–2)	
7	Sabadell	30	13	5	12	52	41	+11	31	
8	Indauchu	30	13	3	14	56	54	+2	29 (Note: Indauchu finished ahead of Baracaldo and Comtal on head-to-head points: Indauchu 5 pts, Baracaldo 4 pts, Comtal 3 pts)	
9	Baracaldo	30	11	7	12	53	51	+2	29	
10	Comtal	30	11	7	12	46	45	+1	29	
11	Basconia	30	11	5	14	41	57	−16	27 (Note: Basconia finished ahead of Cultural Leonesa on head-to-head goal difference: Cultural Leonesa–Basconia 2–1, Basconia–Cultural Leonesa 4–2)	
12	Cultural Leonesa	30	10	7	13	47	61	−14	27	
13	Alavés (R)	30	8	8	14	44	70	−26	24 (Note: Alavés finished ahead of Sestao on head-to-head points: Sestao–Alavés 1–1, Alavés–Sestao 3–1)	Qualification for the relegation playoffs
14	Sestao (O)	30	9	6	15	30	47	−17	24	Qualification for the relegation playoffs
15	Avilés (R)	30	6	10	14	38	52	−14	22	Relegation to Tercera División
16	Ferrol (R)	30	9	3	18	50	79	−29	21	Relegation to Tercera División

Source: BDFútbol
Rules for classification: 1) points; 2) head-to-head points; 3) head-to-head goal difference; 4) goal difference; 5) number of goals scored
(O) Play-off winners; (P) Promoted; (R) Relegated

=== Top goalscorers ===
Goalscorers	Goals	Team
(Spain) Cesáreo Rivera	23	Ourense
(Spain) Nicolás Mentxaka	19	Baracaldo
(Spain) Francisco Sampedro	17	Real Santander
(Spain) Javier Barrena	16	Indauchu
(Spain) Lolo Gómez	15	Celta Vigo

=== Top goalkeepers ===
Goalkeeper	Goals	Matches	Average	Team
(Spain) Padrón	37	30	1.23	Celta Vigo
(Spain) Gelucho	33	25	1.32	Ourense
(Spain) Juan Visa	34	22	1.55	Terrassa
(Spain) Juan Emery	46	29	1.59	Deportivo La Coruña
(Spain) Manuel Barea	34	20	1.7	Real Gijón

=== Results ===
Home \ Away	ALA	AVI	BAR	BAS	CEL	COM	CUL	DEP	FER	GIJ	IND	ORE	SAB	SAT	SES	TER
Alavés	—	3–3	6–1	0–0	1–0	1–1	3–1	0–0	5–2	3–2	2–2	1–2	2–1	1–1	3–1	3–1
Avilés	4–0	—	1–1	1–1	0–0	1–1	2–1	1–2	2–1	4–0	0–0	0–1	0–1	1–1	1–3	3–0
Baracaldo	1–1	3–1	—	1–2	2–0	2–0	6–2	2–0	5–1	0–4	0–0	4–0	1–2	1–0	0–0	5–1
Basconia	2–0	3–1	1–3	—	0–2	0–1	4–2	0–1	5–0	2–0	3–0	0–0	2–1	1–2	2–1	1–1
Celta Vigo	5–0	3–0	3–1	5–1	—	2–1	3–1	4–0	5–2	2–1	4–2	1–1	4–0	0–0	3–1	1–0
Comtal	2–0	1–1	3–3	1–2	3–0	—	4–1	2–2	4–1	5–0	2–1	5–1	2–0	1–0	1–1	2–1
Cultural Leonesa	3–2	2–2	1–0	2–1	5–1	2–1	—	2–3	1–1	0–0	4–2	2–0	2–1	1–2	4–1	1–1
Deportivo La Coruña	4–2	3–1	3–1	2–0	2–1	2–0	4–1	—	3–0	1–1	3–1	1–2	1–0	1–2	5–1	1–0
Ferrol	5–2	5–2	3–3	5–0	1–2	1–1	2–3	2–5	—	1–0	1–0	1–0	2–1	0–3	2–3	2–1
Gijón	3–0	0–1	3–1	0–1	3–1	6–1	3–0	4–1	4–1	—	3–0	4–2	1–0	1–1	5–0	2–0
Indauchu	4–1	3–0	2–1	5–1	2–1	3–0	2–0	4–3	3–1	2–0	—	7–4	4–1	3–1	0–1	1–3
Orense	5–0	3–3	4–0	4–1	1–3	4–0	2–0	3–0	4–1	3–0	1–0	—	1–0	1–0	1–1	1–0
Sabadell	7–0	4–2	1–1	1–1	1–3	2–1	2–2	3–1	7–2	2–0	3–1	2–1	—	2–1	4–0	2–2
Santander	4–1	4–0	3–2	8–2	1–1	2–0	6–1	3–1	2–1	5–1	2–0	1–1	0–0	—	4–2	1–0
Sestao	1–1	1–0	0–1	2–0	0–1	2–0	0–0	2–0	0–1	1–2	2–0	0–0	0–1	1–3	—	1–0
Terrassa	2–0	1–0	3–1	5–2	4–2	1–0	0–0	2–1	3–2	3–3	6–2	3–3	1–0	0–0	2–1	—

Source: BDFútbol
Legend: Blue = home team win; Yellow = draw; Red = away team win.

== Group South ==
=== Teams ===
Location of teams in Segunda División 1959-60 Group South
Canary Islands

Club	City	Stadium
CA Almería	Almería	La Falange
CD Badajoz	Badajoz	El Vivero
Cádiz CF	Cádiz	Ramón de Carranza
CA Ceuta	Ceuta	Alfonso Murube
Córdoba CF	Córdoba	El Arcángel
CF Extremadura	Almendralejo	Francisco de la Hera
Real Jaén CF	Jaén	La Victoria
Levante UD	Valencia	Vallejo
RCD Mallorca	Mallorca	Luis Sitjar
CD Mestalla	Valencia	Mestalla
Real Murcia	Murcia	La Condomina
AD Plus Ultra	Madrid	Campo de Ciudad Lineal
AD Rayo Vallecano	Madrid	Vallecas
Recreativo de Huelva	Huelva	Municipal
CD San Fernando	San Fernando	Marqués de Varela
CD Tenerife	Santa Cruz de Tenerife	Heliodoro Rodríguez López

=== League table ===
Pos	Team	Pld	W	D	L	GF	GA	GD	Pts	Promotion, qualification or relegation
1	Mallorca (P)	30	16	8	6	44	22	+22	40	Promotion to La Liga
2	Córdoba	30	18	3	9	52	24	+28	39	Qualification for the promotion playoffs
3	Jaén	30	17	3	10	54	37	+17	37	
4	Plus Ultra	30	12	11	7	58	43	+15	35	
5	Rayo Vallecano	30	15	3	12	47	40	+7	33 (Note: Rayo Vallecano finished ahead of Levante on overall goal difference)	
6	Levante	30	15	3	12	57	51	+6	33	
7	Murcia	30	11	10	9	37	34	+3	32	
8	Atlético Ceuta	30	13	5	12	41	36	+5	31	
9	San Fernando	30	12	4	14	44	48	−4	28 (Note: San Fernando finished ahead of Tenerife and Mestalla on head-to-head points: San Fernando 5 pts, Tenerife 4 pts, Mestalla 3 pts)	
10	Tenerife	30	11	6	13	41	48	−7	28	
11	Mestalla	30	13	2	15	40	42	−2	28	
12	Extremadura	30	10	7	13	50	49	+1	27	
13	Recreativo (R)	30	9	7	14	41	58	−17	25	Qualification for the relegation playoffs
14	Cádiz (O)	30	9	5	16	43	55	−12	23 (Note: Cádiz finished ahead of Atlético Almería on head-to-head goal difference: Atlético Almería–Cádiz 3–1, Cádiz–Atlético Almería 4–1)	Qualification for the relegation playoffs
15	Atlético Almería (R)	30	7	9	14	24	57	−33	23	Relegation to Tercera División
16	Badajoz (R)	30	7	4	19	37	66	−29	18	Relegation to Tercera División

Source: BDFútbol
Rules for classification: 1) points; 2) head-to-head points; 3) head-to-head goal difference; 4) goal difference; 5) number of goals scored
(O) Play-off winners; (P) Promoted; (R) Relegated

=== Top goalscorers ===
Goalscorers	Goals	Team
(Spain) José Paredes	25	Levante
(Austria) Fritz Hollaus	18	Rayo Vallecano
(Spain) Juan Manuel Villa	16	Plus Ultra
(Spain) Quirro	16	Recreativo
(Spain) Manuel Haro	15	Jaén

=== Top goalkeepers ===
Goalkeeper	Goals	Matches	Average	Team
(Spain) Ricardo Zamora	18	27	0.67	Mallorca
(Spain) José Campillo	34	30	1.13	Murcia
(Spain) Félix Arrizabalaga	32	27	1.19	Mestalla
(Spain) Lorenzo Zúnica	35	29	1.21	Atlético Ceuta
(Spain) José Bermúdez	37	30	1.23	Jaén

=== Results ===
Home \ Away	ALM	BAD	CÁD	CEU	CÓR	EXT	JAÉ	LEV	MLL	MES	MUR	PLU	RAY	REC	SFE	TEN
Atlético Almería	—	0–2	3–1	1–0	0–1	2–1	3–1	1–1	0–0	4–0	1–1	0–0	0–0	0–0	1–0	3–2
Badajoz	3–0	—	2–1	0–0	0–2	0–2	0–2	1–2	0–0	4–2	2–1	1–4	2–2	1–1	3–2	1–2
Cádiz	4–1	3–1	—	2–2	1–3	6–1	0–2	2–1	2–2	0–1	3–2	1–1	3–1	3–0	1–0	2–0
Atlético Ceuta	5–0	5–1	1–1	—	1–0	4–0	2–1	2–0	1–0	1–0	0–0	2–1	1–0	2–0	0–0	3–0
Córdoba	4–0	6–1	3–0	3–1	—	3–1	1–0	3–1	0–0	3–0	0–1	2–0	1–0	1–1	4–1	2–0
Extremadura	0–0	3–1	3–0	4–0	2–0	—	3–0	1–2	1–3	2–1	1–1	2–2	4–1	5–1	1–2	2–0
Real Jaén	7–1	4–0	2–1	3–1	1–0	2–1	—	4–2	2–0	3–1	1–1	1–0	2–1	1–2	3–2	2–1
Levante	1–1	3–2	1–0	3–1	2–0	2–1	1–3	—	1–2	1–0	2–0	4–3	2–0	4–2	3–2	8–2
Mallorca	6–0	2–0	6–2	1–0	1–0	2–2	2–0	2–1	—	1–0	2–0	1–1	0–0	2–0	2–1	1–0
Mestalla	1–0	3–1	3–1	2–0	0–1	3–0	2–1	2–0	0–1	—	3–1	2–1	1–3	7–0	1–0	0–0
Real Murcia	0–0	1–3	2–0	2–1	2–0	1–1	3–1	0–0	0–1	1–1	—	3–0	1–0	3–0	1–0	2–0
Plus Ultra	4–0	1–0	1–0	4–0	1–1	2–1	2–2	4–2	1–1	3–1	2–2	—	2–3	4–1	4–2	1–0
Rayo Vallecano	4–0	1–0	2–1	1–0	1–4	2–0	2–1	5–3	1–0	4–1	4–2	1–2	—	1–0	4–0	2–1
Recreativo	4–1	6–3	1–1	3–2	0–1	2–2	0–1	1–0	2–1	0–1	4–1	2–2	2–1	—	3–0	1–1
San Fernando	2–1	2–0	5–0	1–2	1–0	2–2	2–1	3–2	2–1	2–0	0–1	3–3	1–0	3–2	—	1–1
Tenerife	2–0	3–2	2–1	2–1	4–3	2–1	0–0	1–2	2–1	3–1	1–1	2–2	3–0	3–0	1–2	—

Source: BDFútbol
Legend: Blue = home team win; Yellow = draw; Red = away team win.

== Promotion playoffs ==
=== First leg ===
22 May 1960	Celta Vigo	2–2	Valladolid	Vigo
	Bayo 52', 88'	Report	Morollón 49'; Zaldúa 60'	Stadium: Balaídos; Referee: Gardeazabal Garay

29 May 1960	Real Sociedad	2–1	Córdoba	San Sebastián
	Azcárate 2'; Paz 34'	Report	Joaquín 68'	Stadium: Atocha; Referee: Marrón Martín

=== Second leg ===
29 May 1960	Valladolid	5–0 (7–2 agg.)	Celta Vigo	Valladolid
	Solé 29' (pen.), 69' (pen.); Zaldúa 32', 51'; Endériz 88'	Report		Stadium: José Zorrilla; Referee: Zariquiegui Izco

5 June 1960	Córdoba	1–0 (2–2 agg.)	Real Sociedad	Córdoba
	Homar 17'	Report		Stadium: El Arcángel; Referee: García Fernández

=== Tiebreaker ===
7 June 1960	Real Sociedad	1–0	Córdoba	Madrid
	Rivera 50'	Report		Stadium: Santiago Bernabéu; Referee: Caballero Camacho

== Relegation playoffs ==
=== First leg ===
19 June 1960	Castellón	3–1	Recreativo	Castellón de la Plana
	Duarte 10'; Doménech 44', 70'	Report	Quirro 6'	Stadium: Castalia; Referee: Arrese Napal

19 June 1960	Manresa	1–1	Sestao	Manresa
	Queralt 83'	Report	Izaguirre 57'	Stadium: El Pujolet; Referee: Canera Coscolín

19 June 1960	Salamanca	2–0	Alavés	Salamanca
	Toni 46'; Blanco 49'	Report		Stadium: Calvario; Referee: Ruiz Alciturri

19 June 1960	Algeciras	1–1	Cádiz	Algeciras
	Pepín 40'	Report	García 79'	Stadium: El Mirador; Referee: Clausí

=== Second leg ===
25 June 1960	Sestao	3–0 (4–1 agg.)	Manresa	Sestao
	Sasia 34', 49', 55'	Report		Stadium: Las Llanas; Referee: Razquin Antía

26 June 1960	Alavés	1–1 (1–3 agg.)	Salamanca	Vitoria-Gasteiz
	Uribe 51'	Report	Barrado 44'	Stadium: Mendizorrotza; Referee: Mateu Bernat

26 June 1960	Recreativo	1–2 (2–5 agg.)	Castellón	Huelva
	Víctor 58'	Report	Vitaller 55'; Duarte 82'	Stadium: Colombino; Referee: De la O Santiago

26 June 1960	Cádiz	2–1 (3–2 agg.)	Algeciras	Cádiz
	Pedrusco 49'; Sornichero 57'	Report	Soler 87'	Stadium: Ramón de Carranza; Referee: Pascual Hernández
