= Román Emery =

Román Emery may refer to:

- Román Emery (footballer, born 1931) (1931–2023), Spanish footballer
- Román Emery (footballer, born 1902) (1902–?), Spanish footballer
