= Ricardo Zamora (disambiguation) =

Ricardo Zamora (1901–1978), Spanish football goalkeeper and manager.

Ricardo Zamora may also refer to:

- Ricardo Zamora (1933–2003), Spanish football goalkeeper and son of the above footballer
- Ricardo Zamora Trophy, a football award for the goalkeeper in La Liga who has the lowest "goals-to-games" ratio
