= Manuel Carrasco =

Manuel Carrasco may refer to:

- Manuel Carrasco Formiguera (1890–1938), Spanish lawyer and politician
- Manuel Carrasco (footballer) (1894–1935), Spanish footballer
- Manuel Carrasco (singer) (born 1981), Spanish-Romani pop singer
