= Juan Emery =

Spanish footballer (1933–2015)

Personal information
- Full name: Juan María Emery Alza
- Date of birth: 18 February 1933
- Place of birth: Irun, Spain
- Date of death: 10 May 2015 (aged 82)
- Place of death: Hondarribia, Spain
- Height: 1.73 m (5 ft 8 in)
- Position: Goalkeeper

Youth career
- Real Unión

Senior career*
Years	Team	Apps	(Gls)
1951–1952	Alavés	10	(0)
1952–1953	Burgos	16	(0)
1953–1957	Logroñés	51	(0)
1957–1959	Real Unión	15	(0)
1959–1962	Deportivo La Coruña	54	(0)
1962–1964	Sporting Gijón	31	(0)
1964–1965	Recreativo	24	(0)
1965–1966	Granada	3	(0)
1966–1967	Jaén		
Total		204	(0)
- * Club domestic league appearances and goals

Juan María Emery Alza (18 February 1933 – 10 May 2015) was a Spanish footballer who played as a goalkeeper. He spent most of his career in the Segunda División, appearing in 204 games over 14 seasons.

== Club career ==
Born in Irun, Gipuzkoa, Emery began playing professionally with Logroñés, making his Segunda División debut in a 2–1 home win over Cultural Leonesa on 7 November 1954. After the club's relegation at the end of his third season, he moved to his hometown side Real Unión, suffering the same fate in 1959.

Subsequently, Emery signed for Deportivo de La Coruña, where he spent a further three campaigns in the second division. He contributed 14 games as his team promoted to La Liga in 1962, as champions, but remained in the former tier until his retirement, in representation of Sporting de Gijón, Recreativo de Huelva and Granada, before retiring in 1967 after a spell with amateurs Real Jaén.

Emery was comparatively short for a goalkeeper at 1.73 m, but was remembered for his quick reflexes.

== Personal life ==
Emery's father, Antonio, was also a footballer and a goalkeeper, playing mainly for Real Unión. His son, Unai, was a midfielder who later went into management, notably with Valencia and Sevilla; his elder brother, Román, was also a midfielder, and the two shared teams at Logroñés.

Emery died on 10 May 2015 in Hondarribia, aged 82.
