= Román Emery (footballer, born 1902) =

Spanish footballer (1902–?)

Personal information
- Full name: Román Emery Arocena
- Date of birth: 1902
- Place of birth: Hondarribia, Gipuzkoa, Spain
- Date of death: Unknown
- Place of death: Unknown
- Position: Midfielder

Senior career*
Years	Team	Apps	(Gls)
1917–1922	Real Unión		

International career
1920	Spain	0	(0)
Medal record
Men's football
Representing Spain
Olympic Games
Silver medal – second place	1920 Antwerp	Team Competition
- * Club domestic league appearances and goals

Román Emery Arocena (1902 – ?) was a Spanish footballer who played as a midfielder for Real Unión and who competed in the 1920 Summer Olympics.

== Club career ==
Born in 1902 in Hondarribia, Gipuzkoa, Emery began his football career at his hometown club Real Unión in 1907, at the age of 15, and in his first season at the club, he played a crucial role in helping his side win the 1917–18 North Regional Championship, the club's first-ever such title, thus qualifying to the 1918 Copa del Rey, in which he started in the final against Madrid, a 2–0 victory. Emery also started in the 1922 cup final, which ended in a 1–5 loss to Barcelona.

Two of his brothers, Francisco and Antonio, were also footballers, and all of them played at Real Unión, with the latter initially playing as a winger, but who years later changed his position on the field to that of goalkeeper after the injury of Unión's starting goalkeeper. He is the great-uncle of Unai Emery.

== International career ==
Emery was a member of the Spanish squad that competed in the 1920 Summer Olympics, being a late replacement for the originally selected Ramón Encinas, who did not obtain leave from work; however, Emery did not travel to Belgium either due to illness, so he failed to feature in a single game as Spain won silver after beating the Netherlands 3–1 in the decisive game.

== Honours ==
Real Unión

- North Regional Championship: 1917–18
- Copa del Rey: 1918; runner-up 1922

Spain

- Summer Olympics silver medal: 1920
