= Aaron Danks =

English football coach (born 1983)

Personal information
- Date of birth: 15 June 1983 (age 43)
- Place of birth: Birmingham, England

Team information
- Current team: Bayern Munich (assistant coach)

Managerial career
- Years: Team
- 2022: Aston Villa (caretaker)
- 2026: Bayern Munich (caretaker)

Aaron Danks (born 15 June 1983) is an English professional football coach who currently works as an assistant coach for Bundesliga club Bayern Munich.

Danks was assistant manager to Vincent Kompany at Anderlecht, before leaving to be assistant to Dean Smith and Steven Gerrard at Aston Villa. He later joined Michael Carrick's staff at Middlesbrough. He has also coached at Birmingham City, West Bromwich Albion and England U21.

== Career ==
=== Youth coaching ===
Danks' first role in football was as a Community Football Development Officer at Birmingham City, joining in 1999 and later coaching in their academy. In 2005, Danks was hired as a youth coach at the West Bromwich Albion Academy, working for the club for over a decade between 2005 and 2016, before leaving after being selected by The Football Association to become Head of Specialist Coaching and Lead Offensive Specialist Coach for various levels of the England national team. Danks was part of the coaching staff for the England U20 team that won the 2017 FIFA U-20 World Cup.

As part of his work with the FA, Danks spent a short time with basketball team Golden State Warriors, working closely with Stephen Curry and his individual development coach.

In 2019, Danks attained a UEFA Pro Licence, graduating alongside the likes of Steven Gerrard and Peter Schmeichel.

Danks worked as assistant manager for the England U21 side for one year from 2020 to 2021.

=== Senior coaching ===
==== Anderlecht ====
On 1 July 2021, Danks was appointed assistant manager to Vincent Kompany at Belgian First Division A club Anderlecht.

==== Aston Villa ====
On 1 September 2021, Danks departed Anderlecht to join Premier League club Aston Villa, as assistant to Dean Smith, following the departure of Richard O'Kelly. On 13 November 2021, following the sacking of Dean Smith and the appointment of Steven Gerrard as Aston Villa manager it was confirmed that Danks would retain his position as assistant manager.

On 21 October 2022, the day after the sacking of Gerrard as Villa manager, it was announced that Danks would remain at Villa and act as caretaker manager for their upcoming Premier League match against Brentford, which Villa won 4–0. On 24 October, Aston Villa announced that Unai Emery would take over as manager, however, due to work permit formalities - Danks would remain as interim manager until 1 November. On 31 October, it was confirmed that Danks had been offered another coaching role at Aston Villa, away from the first team.

==== Middlesbrough ====
On 1 December 2022, Danks departed Aston Villa and joined Michael Carrick's backroom staff at Middlesbrough as a first team coach.

==== Bayern Munich ====
On 21 June 2024, he rejoined the coaching staff of Vincent Kompany at Bundesliga club Bayern Munich. In late April 2026, he served as head coach of the club during their Champions League semi-final first leg against Paris Saint-Germain while Kompany was serving a one-match touchline ban. He took charge of five games in October and November 2026, due to Kompany being unable to do so due to health reasons.

== Managerial statistics ==
As of 7 November 2026

Managerial record by team and tenure
Team	From	To	Record					Ref
Team	From	To	P	W	D	L	Win %	Ref
Aston Villa (caretaker)	21 October 2022	1 November 2022	2	1	0	1	50.0	
Bayern Munich (caretaker)	25 October 2026	7 November 2026	5	4	1	0	80.0	
Total			7	5	1	1	71.4	—
