= Juan Legarreta =

Spanish footballer (1897-1978)

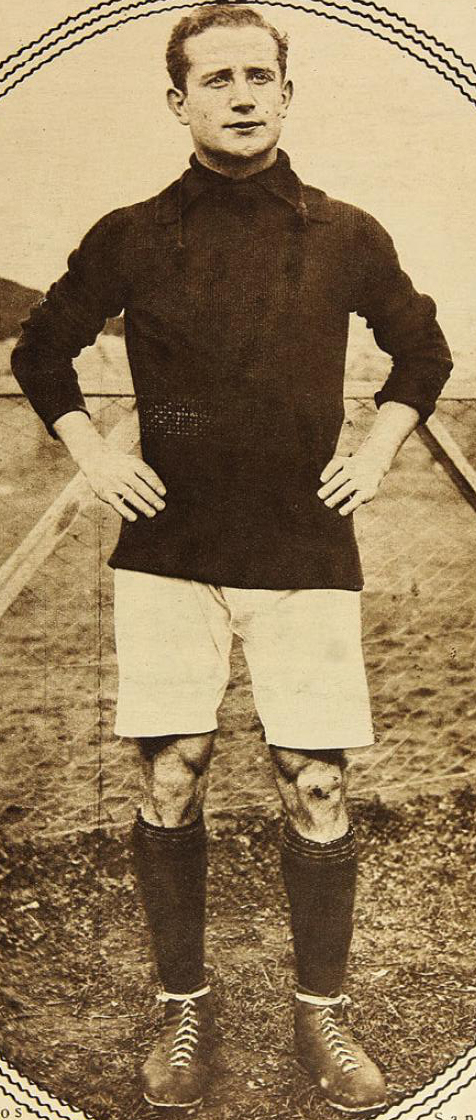

Personal information
- Full name: Juan Legarreta Ugarte
- Date of birth: 8 July 1897
- Place of birth: Irún, Spain
- Date of death: 22 November 1978 (aged 81)
- Place of death: Santiago, Chile
- Height: 1.84 m (6 ft 1/2 in)
- Position: Centre back

Youth career
- Nuestra Señora del Juncal
- Irún SC

Senior career*
Years	Team	Apps	(Gls)
1910–1914	Irún SC		
1915–1919	Real Unión		
1920–1921	Ibérico Balompié		
1922–1930	Unión Española		

International career
1915	Basque Country		
1921	Chile	2	(0)
- * Club domestic league appearances and goals

Juan Legarreta Ugarte (1897 in Irún, Spain - 22 November 1978 in Santiago, Chile) was a former Spanish-Chilean footballer who played for Unión Española as a central defender.

== Club career ==
He began his senior career at the age of 16 playing for Irún Sporting Club, making his debut against an unknown Belgian team and scoring three goals. His best years came with Real Unión - a union of Sporting Club de Irún with Racing Club de Irún - playing a vital role in the club's triumph at the 1918 Copa del Rey Final as he scored both goals of a 2-0 win over Madrid FC (now known as Real Madrid). He then went to Chile to play for both Club Ibérico Balompié and Unión Deportiva Española.

== International career ==
In 1915, aged 18, he represented the Northern Basque Country national team, a squad made-up of Basque players. He was part of the team that won the first edition of the Prince of Asturias Cup in 1915, an inter-regional competition organized by the RFEF. He scored the only goal of a 1–0 win over Catalonia.

He also represented Chile, playing two friendly matches against Argentina on 25 September and 2 October 1921.

== Honours ==
Real Unión

- Copa del Rey: 1918

Ibérico Balompié

- Copa Chile: 1920

Unión Española

- Liga Central de Football de Santiago: 1928
- Copa Chile: 1924, 1925

Basque Country

- Prince of Asturias Cup: 1915
