= 1918 Copa del Rey final =

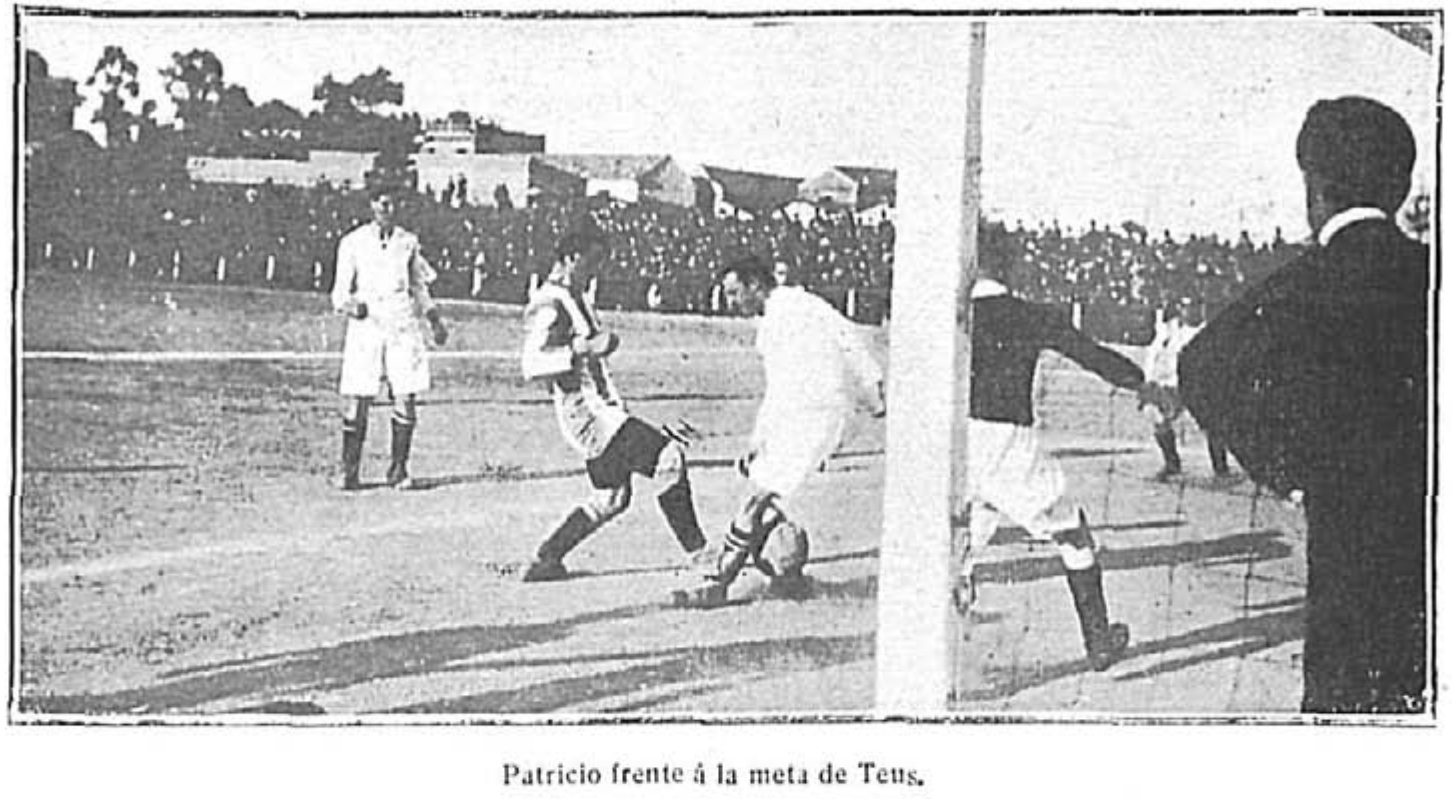
- Patricio Arabolaza in front of Eduardo Teus' goal during the match
- Event: 1918 Copa del Rey
Real Unión	Madrid FC
2	0
- Date: 12 May 1918
- Venue: Estadio O'Donnell, Madrid
- Referee: Josep Torrens
- Attendance: 10,000

The 1918 Copa del Rey final was an association football match between Real Unión and Madrid FC on 12 May 1918, at the O'Donnell Stadium in Madrid. It was the deciding match of the Spanish cup competition, the Copa del Rey. Real Unión beat Madrid FC 2–0 to win their first title. Unión's captain, forward Juan Legarreta, scored both goals. The final was attended by approximately 10,000 spectators.

== Route to the final ==
Real Unión
Round	Opposition	Score
Quarterfinal (single leg)	Sporting de Gijón	4–1
Semifinal (single leg)	Real Fortuna Football Club de Vigo	4–1

The Copa del Rey is an annual single-elimination tournament which at the time, before the formation of the national league, consisted of the winners of Spain's eight regional leagues. Real Unión Club and Madrid FC had qualified to the 16th edition of the Copa del Rey as champions of the North Regional Championship and Central Regional Championship, respectively.

Although Real Unión had not won the final before, it was the product of the merger between Irún Sporting Club and Racing Club de Irún, the latter of which had won the 1913 Copa del Rey. In the quarterfinals, Unión beat Sporting de Gijón 4–1 thanks to a hat-trick from René Petit and a header from Agustín Amantegui. Sporting's goal came from a penalty. Two days later, Unión beat Real Fortuna FC in the semifinals, again with a 4–1 result. Madrid newspaper Gran Vida's Nasarre mentions an upset by the Galicians was expected and noted the excellent quality of their players, although their lack of cohesion allowed Unión to keep possession of the ball throughout the match and win. Madrid-Sport singled out José Angoso's "decisive" performance in that match.

Madrid FC
Round	Opposition	Score
Quarterfinal (1st leg)	RCD Espanyol	0–3
Quarterfinal (2nd leg)	RCD Espanyol	1–0
Quarterfinal (replay match)	RCD Espanyol	2–1
Semifinal (1st leg)	Recreativo de Huelva	2–0
Semifinal (2nd leg)	Recreativo de Huelva	4–0

Madrid faced Catalan champions RCD Espanyol in the quarterfinal. The first leg was played in Barcelona, with the match delayed by one day due to strong rains that lasted until six in the afternoon on the original day of the match. Espanyol eventually won 3–0. In the second leg Madrid beat the Blanquiazules with one goal, Espanyol playing with too much restraint to take advantage of the home team according to Ricardo Ruiz Ferry of El Sol. A replay match was played two days after the second leg which Madrid won 2–1, although Ruiz Ferry commented that Madrid looked dominant throughout the match.

The semifinals saw Madrid play against Southern Region champions Recreativo de Huelva. The first leg was played in Huelva, with La Época and El Imparcial commenting on the locals being "stunned" by Madrid FC's "assault" in the first half. Manuel Posada opened the scoring in the opening half with a "stupendous" header a few minutes into the match. Santiago Bernabéu followed by scoring a goal of his own. Both teams created more frequent and "beautiful" chances in the second half, according to La Época, but due to the shot-stopping of Recreativo's goalkeeper and a crucial clearance by Feliciano Rey no goals were scored in the second half, the match ending in a 2–0 score in favor of Madrid. The second leg was played in Madrid. Huelva quickly gave up a penalty, but it was shot outside of goal. Madrid followed with a series of shots on goal that were all capably stopped by the Huelva goalkeeper, according to El Imparcial. Recreativo maintained a defensive posture throughout the first half, giving up a second penalty which Ricardo Álvarez scored to give Madrid the lead. The match picked up the pace in the second half, although once again Huelva was able to prevent Madrid's many opportunities from resulting in further scoring for most of the second half. However, shortly before the end of the match Madrid scored three goals in quick succession. With a final result of 4–0, Madrid had won both matches and qualified for the final.

== Match ==
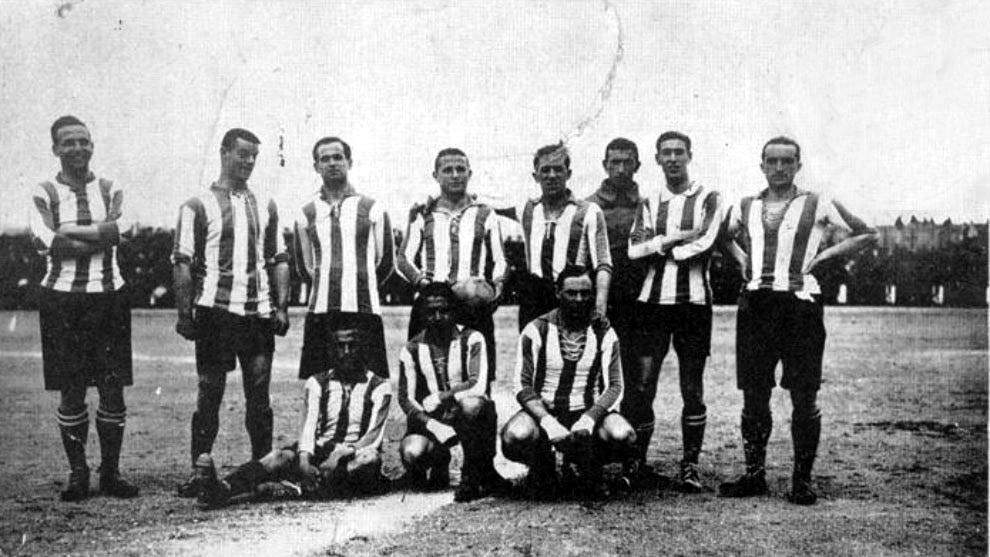
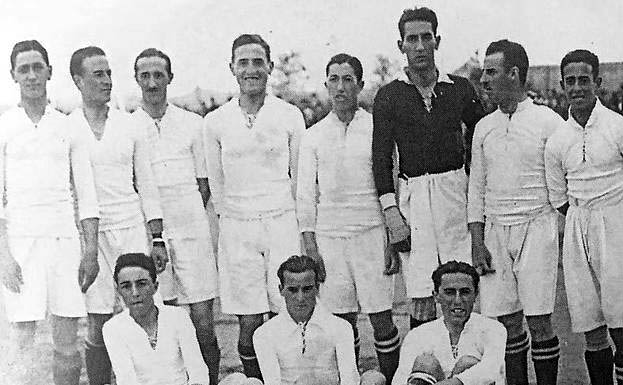
The Real Unión (left) and Madrid FC teams that played the final

=== Build-up ===
The match was completely sold out, for the first time in the stadium's history. Those that were unable to buy a ticket stormed the pitch, with La Acción calculating a total attendance of 10,000 and La Tribuna calculating an attendance of 8,000. Both teams used the 2-3-5 formation.

=== Summary ===
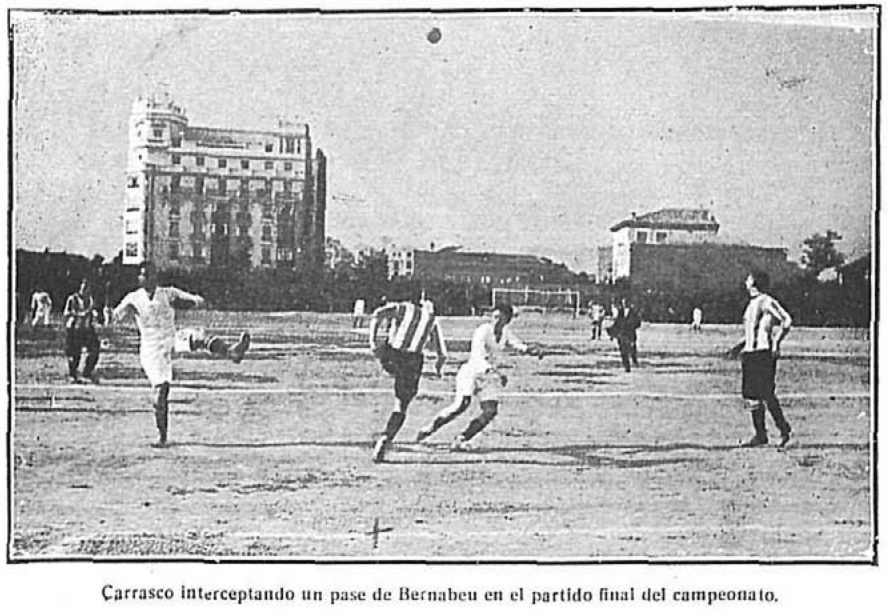
Photograph of the final. The caption reads: "[Real Union player Manuel] Carrasco intercepting a pass from [Madrid FC player Santiago] Bernabeu in the final match of the tournament"

Real Unión's defense relied on the skill of goalkeeper Muguruza and the combination of center-backs Manuel Carrasco and José Múgica. Their three midfielders had a strong "understanding" with the forwards and were "almost always on attack" according to La Acción. Their midfielder René Petit was signaled as their key player by El Universo. Madrid's team in comparison was lacking the skill that had led them to win the previous year's competition.

The match started out relatively even, with a high intensity from both teams. A goal-scoring opportunity for Madrid as a result of a corner kick was cleared by René Petit. Moments thereafter, a foul was called against Patricio Arabolaza for touching the ball with his hand in Madrid's goal area. Shortly before the end of the first half, a shot on target by Unión was blocked by Eduardo Teus. An assistant referee waved a handkerchief, indicating a goal was scored, explaining to Teus and other Madrid players that the ball had been stopped behind the goal line while the Unión players took advantage of the distraction to place the ball into the goal.

In the second half, Madrid dominated the first 30 minutes but were unable to score against Irun's "formidable defense", who prevented Madrid's usual combination passing style. The pitch was again invaded by the fans after the referee did not call a penalty against Uníon. In the last minutes of the second half, Madrid's players became unable to stop their opponents' attacks, leaving Teus "helpless" according to Fr. Nasarre, which led to the second goal of the match by Juan Legarreta in favor of Real Unión.

The referee Josep Torrens was seen to perform neutrally and capably by La Acción, if only left a bit taken aback by the reactions of the crowd to his calls. Eme Erro of El Liberal, however, attributed the victory of Unión to the referee and claimed he changed his mind many times on calls after the crowd's protests.

=== Details ===
12 May 1918

Real Unión	2–0	Madrid FC
Legarreta 45', 85'	Report

Estadio O'Donnell, Madrid
Attendance: 10,000
Referee: Josep Torrens (Catalunya)

Real Unión	Madrid FC

GK	1	(Spain) Domingo Muguruza
DF	2	(Spain) Manuel Carrasco
DF	3	(Spain) José Múgica
MF	4	(Spain) Román Emery
MF	5	(France) René Petit
MF	6	(Spain) Ramón Eguiazábal
FW	7	(Spain) José Angoso
FW	8	(Spain) Juan Legarreta (c)
FW	9	(Spain) Patricio Arabolaza
FW	10	(Spain) Agustín Amantegui
FW	11	(Spain) Elías Acosta
Manager:
?

GK	1	(Spain) Eduardo Teus
DF	2	(Spain) E. Cordero
DF	3	(Spain) Eulogio Aranguren
MF	4	(Spain) Ricardo Álvarez
MF	5	(Spain) Alberto Machimbarrena (c)
MF	6	(Spain) Feliciano Rey
FW	7	(Spain) Antonio De Miguel
FW	8	(Spain) Santiago Bernabéu
FW	9	(Spain) Manuel Posada
FW	10	(Spain) Joaquín Caruncho
FW	11	(Spain) José María Sansinenea
Manager:
(England) Arthur Johnson
