= Josep Torrens =

Spanish footballer, referee, manager, and journalist

Personal information
- Full name: Josep Torrens Font
- Date of birth: 5 May 1891
- Place of birth: Barcelona, Catalonia, Spain
- Date of death: unknown
- Place of death: Spain
- Position: Forward

Senior career*
| Years | Team | Apps | (Gls) |
| 1908–1916 | Universitari SC | | |
| 1909–1910 | → Espanyol (on loan) | | |

Managerial career
- 1932–1936: Catalonia
- * Club domestic league appearances and goals

Josep Torrens Font (5 May 1891 – unknown) was a Spanish footballer, referee, manager, journalist, and press manager.

== Playing career ==
Born in the Catalonian town of Barcelona on 5 May 1891, Torrens began his football career at Universitari SC in 1908, aged 17, remaining there for eight years, until 1916. During this period, he played two official matches for Espanyol, the first in the Catalan championship and the second in the qualifying rounds for the 1910 Copa del Rey. In the latter match, Torrens played alongside his fellow Universitari teammate Francisco Barenys and Vidal from Català, who covered the absences of José Quirante, Molins, and Soler, and he then scored a goal to help his side to a resounding 9–2 victory over FC Espanya. He later served as president and secretary of Universitari.

== Refereeing career ==
After retiring, Torrens served as a referee, officiating several matches in the Catalan Championship and Copa del Rey between 1916 and 1924, including the final of the 1918 Copa del Rey between Real Unión and Madrid FC, which ended in a 2–0 win in favour of the Basques. During the final, the pitch was invaded by the fans after he did not call a penalty against Uníon; in the following day, the local newspaper La Acción stated that his performance was neutral and capable, although he was a bit taken aback by the reactions of the crowd to his calls. The journalist Eme Erro of El Liberal, however, attributed the victory of Unión to the referee and claimed he changed his mind many times on calls after the crowd's protests.

In the following year, in 1919, Torrens was elected president of the Catalan Referees' Association, a position that he still held in January 1920, when he refereed a match between the football teams of Catalonia and Biscay, which ended in a 2–1 victory for the Catalans. However, he resigned from the CRA's presidency shortly after.

== Managerial career ==
In the early 1930s, Torrens became the coach of the Catalan national team, which he led in a friendly match against a Budapest XI on 27 August 1933, and against an unofficial Spanish side on 14 February 1934, with the latter ending in a 2–0 loss. Four months later, in June 1934, he led Catalonia in two friendlies against the Brazilian national team, winning the first 2–1, and drawing the latter at two. He remained as Catalonia's coach until 1936.

== Journalist career ==
In the 1910s, Torrens directed the weekly El Sport, and then La Jornada Deportiva from 1921 until 1925, and Mundo Deportivo for a full decade, from 1929 until 1939. In 1932, he served as the president of the Union of Sports Journalists.
