= 1958–59 Segunda División =

28th season of the second-tier football league in Spain

Segunda División
- Season: 1958–59
- Champions: Valladolid; Elche
- Promoted: Valladolid; Elche
- Relegated: Hércules; Girona; Málaga; Real Unión; Eldense
- Matches: 480
- Goals: 1,435 (2.99 per match)
- Top goalscorer: José Cardona (23 goals)
- Best goalkeeper: Fermín Martínez (0.88 goals/match)
- Biggest home win: Eldense 7–0 Badajoz (12 October 1958); Deportivo La Coruña 7–0 Alavés (26 October 1958); Valladolid 8–1 Girona (2 November 1958)
- Biggest away win: Avilés 1–6 Sestao (21 September 1958)
- Highest scoring: Valladolid 8–2 Deportivo La Coruña (5 October 1958)

The 1958–59 Segunda División season was the 28th since its establishment and was played between 13 September 1958 and 19 April 1959.

== Overview before the season ==
32 teams joined the league, including two relegated from the 1957–58 La Liga and 4 promoted from the 1957–58 Tercera División.

Relegated from La Liga

- Valladolid
- Jaén

Promoted from Tercera División

- Baracaldo
- Real Unión
- Elche
- Atlético Almería

== Group North ==
=== Teams ===
Location of teams in Segunda División 1958-59 Group North

| Club | City | Stadium |
|---|---|---|
| Deportivo Alavés | Vitoria | Mendizorroza |
| Real Avilés CF | Avilés | La Exposición |
| Baracaldo Altos Hornos | Baracaldo | Lasesarre |
| CD Basconia | Basauri | Pedro López Cortázar |
| CD Condal | Barcelona | Les Corts |
| RC Deportivo La Coruña | La Coruña | Riazor |
| Club Ferrol | Ferrol | Manuel Rivera |
| Gerona CF | Gerona | Vista Alegre |
| SD Indauchu | Bilbao | Garellano |
| AD Rayo Vallecano | Madrid | Vallecas |
| Real Unión Club de Irún | Irun | Stadium Gal |
| CD Sabadell FC | Sabadell | Cruz Alta |
| Real Santander SD | Santander | El Sardinero |
| Club Sestao | Sestao | Las Llanas |
| CD Tarrasa | Tarrasa | Obispo Irurita |
| Real Valladolid Deportivo | Valladolid | José Zorrilla |

=== League table ===
| Pos | Team | Pld | W | D | L | GF | GA | GD | Pts | Promotion, qualification or relegation |
|---|---|---|---|---|---|---|---|---|---|---|
| 1 | Valladolid (P) | 30 | 19 | 2 | 9 | 70 | 38 | +32 | 40 | Promotion to La Liga |
| 2 | Sabadell | 30 | 16 | 7 | 7 | 55 | 35 | +20 | 39 | Qualification for the promotion playoffs |
| 3 | Indauchu | 30 | 14 | 7 | 9 | 46 | 35 | +11 | 35 | |
| 4 | Condal | 30 | 14 | 4 | 12 | 51 | 41 | +10 | 32 (Note: Condal finished ahead of Basconia on overall goal difference) | |
| 5 | Basconia | 30 | 12 | 8 | 10 | 37 | 43 | −6 | 32 | |
| 6 | Baracaldo | 30 | 12 | 7 | 11 | 38 | 36 | +2 | 31 | |
| 7 | Deportivo La Coruña | 30 | 13 | 4 | 13 | 54 | 49 | +5 | 30 (Note: Deportivo La Coruña finished ahead of Sestao and Real Santander on head-to-head points: Deportivo La Coruña 7 pts, Sestao 3 pts, Real Santander 2 pts) | |
| 8 | Sestao | 30 | 11 | 8 | 11 | 41 | 36 | +5 | 30 | |
| 9 | Real Santander | 30 | 13 | 4 | 13 | 39 | 35 | +4 | 30 | |
| 10 | Ferrol | 30 | 11 | 5 | 14 | 43 | 47 | −4 | 27 (Note: Ferrol finished ahead of Avilés, Tarrasa and Alavés on head-to-head points: Ferrol 7 pts, Avilés 6 pts, Tarrasa 6 pts, Alavés 5 pts. Avilés finished ahead of Tarrasa on head-to-head goal difference: Avilés–Tarrasa 3–0, Tarrasa–Avilés 2–0) | |
| 11 | Avilés | 30 | 11 | 5 | 14 | 40 | 43 | −3 | 27 | |
| 12 | Tarrasa | 30 | 12 | 3 | 15 | 40 | 56 | −16 | 27 | |
| 13 | Alavés (O) | 30 | 10 | 7 | 13 | 34 | 43 | −9 | 27 | Qualification for the relegation playoffs |
| 14 | Rayo Vallecano (O) | 30 | 11 | 4 | 15 | 39 | 46 | −7 | 26 | Qualification for the relegation playoffs |
| 15 | Gerona (R) | 30 | 11 | 3 | 16 | 43 | 64 | −21 | 25 | Relegation to Tercera División |
| 16 | Real Unión (R) | 30 | 8 | 6 | 16 | 34 | 57 | −23 | 22 | Relegation to Tercera División |

Source: BDFútbol
Rules for classification: 1) points; 2) head-to-head points; 3) head-to-head goal difference; 4) goal difference; 5) number of goals scored
(O) Play-off winners; (P) Promoted; (R) Relegated

=== Results ===
| Home \ Away | ALA | AVI | BAR | BAS | CON | DEP | GIR | IND | RFE | RAC | RAY | RUN | SAB | SES | TRR | VLL |
|---|---|---|---|---|---|---|---|---|---|---|---|---|---|---|---|---|
| Alavés | — | 1–1 | 0–0 | 1–0 | 3–2 | 0–3 | 1–0 | 2–1 | 2–0 | 1–1 | 4–0 | 0–0 | 1–0 | 0–1 | 2–0 | 3–1 |
| Avilés | 2–1 | — | 2–0 | 1–1 | 1–0 | 5–1 | 2–0 | 2–0 | 1–2 | 1–2 | 2–1 | 6–1 | 1–0 | 1–6 | 3–0 | 0–0 |
| Baracaldo | 2–0 | 3–0 | — | 1–1 | 0–0 | 3–0 | 0–4 | 1–0 | 1–2 | 3–1 | 1–3 | 1–2 | 3–0 | 0–0 | 1–0 | 3–1 |
| Basconia | 1–1 | 2–0 | 2–1 | — | 3–0 | 1–0 | 3–1 | 0–1 | 4–0 | 1–0 | 2–1 | 1–0 | 0–0 | 5–1 | 3–2 | 0–3 |
| Condal | 0–0 | 4–3 | 3–1 | 4–1 | — | 3–0 | 5–1 | 2–0 | 2–3 | 4–1 | 1–0 | 2–0 | 1–1 | 1–0 | 4–2 | 3–0 |
| Deportivo La Coruña | 7–0 | 0–1 | 1–0 | 1–1 | 3–1 | — | 2–2 | 2–1 | 1–0 | 2–1 | 5–0 | 1–0 | 2–3 | 4–0 | 2–0 | 3–0 |
| Gerona | 2–1 | 2–1 | 0–1 | 2–2 | 2–1 | 3–1 | — | 2–1 | 2–1 | 2–3 | 3–1 | 0–0 | 0–2 | 2–1 | 3–0 | 1–0 |
| Indauchu | 3–1 | 1–0 | 0–0 | 3–0 | 0–2 | 2–1 | 2–1 | — | 2–1 | 3–2 | 1–0 | 5–1 | 1–1 | 2–2 | 2–0 | 4–2 |
| Ferrol | 2–1 | 1–1 | 1–1 | 3–0 | 0–1 | 2–1 | 2–1 | 0–2 | — | 2–0 | 3–3 | 2–0 | 1–1 | 0–1 | 6–1 | 1–3 |
| Real Santander | 2–0 | 1–0 | 2–1 | 5–0 | 1–0 | 0–1 | 2–1 | 2–2 | 0–1 | — | 0–0 | 1–0 | 1–3 | 1–0 | 4–2 | 0–1 |
| Rayo Vallecano | 2–0 | 0–0 | 5–1 | 0–0 | 1–0 | 2–1 | 7–1 | 0–1 | 0–2 | 0–1 | — | 4–0 | 2–1 | 2–1 | 0–1 | 2–1 |
| Real Unión | 2–0 | 3–0 | 1–4 | 1–2 | 2–1 | 3–2 | 4–2 | 2–2 | 2–0 | 0–4 | 0–1 | — | 3–3 | 1–1 | 3–1 | 0–0 |
| Sabadell | 0–3 | 4–2 | 1–1 | 3–0 | 5–1 | 4–2 | 5–0 | 1–0 | 3–1 | 1–0 | 5–0 | 3–1 | — | 3–0 | 1–0 | 1–0 |
| Sestao | 1–1 | 2–0 | 0–2 | 1–1 | 3–0 | 2–2 | 3–1 | 0–0 | 0–0 | 1–0 | 3–0 | 2–1 | 4–0 | — | 2–0 | 1–2 |
| Tarrasa | 3–1 | 2–0 | 2–1 | 2–0 | 2–2 | 1–1 | 2–1 | 1–3 | 4–2 | 2–1 | 2–1 | 3–1 | 0–0 | 2–1 | — | 3–0 |
| Valladolid | 4–3 | 2–1 | 3–0 | 4–0 | 2–1 | 8–2 | 8–1 | 3–1 | 3–2 | 2–0 | 3–1 | 3–0 | 4–0 | 2–1 | 5–0 | — |

Source: BDFútbol
Legend: Blue = home team win; Yellow = draw; Red = away team win.

=== Top goalscorers ===
| Goalscorers | Goals | Team |
|---|---|---|
| (Spain) Delio Morollón | 22 | Valladolid |
| (Spain) Miguel Jones | 15 | Indauchu |
| (Argentina) José Vigo | 15 | Deportivo La Coruña |
| (Spain) Francisco Doval | 15 | Avilés |
| (Spain) Francisco Sampedro | 14 | Condal |

=== Top goalkeepers ===
| Goalkeeper | Goals | Matches | Average | Team |
|---|---|---|---|---|
| (Spain) Fermín Martínez | 22 | 25 | 0.88 | Real Santander |
| (Spain) Juan Parcet | 26 | 25 | 1.04 | Sabadell |
| (Spain) Juan Benegas | 30 | 26 | 1.15 | Valladolid |
| (Spain) Ignacio Ibarreche | 28 | 24 | 1.17 | Indauchu |
| (Spain) Villachica | 33 | 27 | 1.22 | Baracaldo |

== Group South ==
=== Teams ===
Location of teams in Segunda División 1958-59 Group South
Canary Islands

| Club | City | Stadium |
|---|---|---|
| Atlético Almería | Almería | La Falange |
| Atlético Ceuta | Ceuta | Alfonso Murube |
| CD Badajoz | Badajoz | El Vivero |
| Cádiz CF | Cádiz | Ramón de Carranza |
| Córdoba CF | Córdoba | El Arcángel |
| Elche CF | Elche | Altabix |
| CD Eldense | Elda | El Parque |
| CF Extremadura | Almendralejo | Francisco de la Hera |
| Hércules CF | Alicante | La Viña |
| Real Jaén CF | Jaén | La Victoria |
| Levante UD | Valencia | Vallejo |
| CD Málaga | Málaga | La Rosaleda Stadium |
| Real Murcia | Murcia | La Condomina |
| AD Plus Ultra | Madrid | Campo de Ciudad Lineal |
| CD San Fernando | San Fernando | Marqués de Varela |
| CD Tenerife | Santa Cruz de Tenerife | Heliodoro Rodríguez López |

=== League table ===
| Pos | Team | Pld | W | D | L | GF | GA | GD | Pts | Promotion, qualification or relegation |
|---|---|---|---|---|---|---|---|---|---|---|
| 1 | Elche (P) | 30 | 18 | 4 | 8 | 73 | 38 | +35 | 40 | Promotion to La Liga |
| 2 | Levante | 30 | 16 | 5 | 9 | 49 | 33 | +16 | 37 | Qualification for the promotion playoffs |
| 3 | Atlético Almería | 30 | 14 | 4 | 12 | 47 | 41 | +6 | 32 | |
| 4 | Tenerife | 30 | 12 | 7 | 11 | 34 | 38 | −4 | 31 | |
| 5 | Extremadura | 30 | 12 | 6 | 12 | 45 | 47 | −2 | 30 (Note: Extremadura finished ahead of Murcia on head-to-head goal difference: Extremadura–Murcia 4–1, Murcia–Extremadura 2–0) | |
| 6 | Murcia | 30 | 13 | 4 | 13 | 40 | 38 | +2 | 30 | |
| 7 | Cádiz | 30 | 11 | 7 | 12 | 51 | 57 | −6 | 29 (Note: Cádiz finished ahead of Córdoba, Jaén, Plus Ultra, Atlético Ceuta and San Fernando on head-to-head points: Cádiz 11 pts, Córdoba 10 pts, Jaén 10 pts, Plus Ultra 10 pts, Atlético Ceuta 10 pts, San Fernando 9 pts. Córdoba finished ahead of Jaén, Plus Ultra and Atlético Ceuta on head-to-head goal difference) | |
| 8 | Córdoba | 30 | 11 | 7 | 12 | 58 | 52 | +6 | 29 | |
| 9 | Jaén | 30 | 12 | 5 | 13 | 47 | 51 | −4 | 29 | |
| 10 | Plus Ultra | 30 | 11 | 7 | 12 | 39 | 49 | −10 | 29 | |
| 11 | Atlético Ceuta | 30 | 11 | 7 | 12 | 31 | 39 | −8 | 29 | |
| 12 | San Fernando | 30 | 11 | 7 | 12 | 39 | 43 | −4 | 29 | |
| 13 | Hércules (R) | 30 | 10 | 8 | 12 | 44 | 51 | −7 | 28 | Qualification for the relegation playoffs |
| 14 | Badajoz (O) | 30 | 9 | 9 | 12 | 44 | 52 | −8 | 27 (Note: Badajoz finished ahead of Málaga on head-to-head points: Badajoz–Málaga 4–1, Málaga–Badajoz 0–3) | Qualification for the relegation playoffs |
| 15 | Málaga (R) | 30 | 9 | 9 | 12 | 44 | 47 | −3 | 27 | Relegation to Tercera División |
| 16 | Eldense (R) | 30 | 8 | 8 | 14 | 46 | 55 | −9 | 24 | Relegation to Tercera División |

Source: BDFútbol
Rules for classification: 1) points; 2) head-to-head points; 3) head-to-head goal difference; 4) goal difference; 5) number of goals scored
(O) Play-off winners; (P) Promoted; (R) Relegated

=== Results ===
| Home \ Away | ALM | CEU | BAD | CAD | COR | ELC | ELD | EXT | HER | JAE | LEV | CDM | MUR | RMC | SFE | TEN |
|---|---|---|---|---|---|---|---|---|---|---|---|---|---|---|---|---|
| Atlético Almería | — | 3–0 | 2–1 | 1–0 | 5–1 | 2–1 | 1–1 | 2–0 | 5–1 | 3–0 | 2–0 | 4–0 | 0–1 | 3–0 | 3–0 | 3–0 |
| Atlético Ceuta | 0–1 | — | 1–1 | 3–1 | 1–0 | 3–1 | 2–0 | 0–0 | 2–1 | 1–0 | 0–0 | 3–0 | 2–1 | 0–1 | 0–0 | 2–0 |
| Badajoz | 2–2 | 1–1 | — | 2–0 | 1–1 | 2–1 | 2–0 | 0–1 | 5–1 | 2–1 | 2–2 | 4–1 | 2–0 | 2–3 | 0–0 | 1–2 |
| Cádiz | 1–0 | 3–0 | 4–2 | — | 4–1 | 3–0 | 2–2 | 2–0 | 4–0 | 1–2 | 2–2 | 2–2 | 0–0 | 4–0 | 2–1 | 1–2 |
| Córdoba | 5–0 | 1–2 | 3–0 | 5–1 | — | 0–2 | 4–1 | 1–0 | 2–2 | 3–0 | 5–0 | 3–3 | 4–2 | 3–0 | 4–0 | 3–1 |
| Elche | 2–0 | 6–0 | 4–3 | 6–0 | 5–0 | — | 3–1 | 4–1 | 2–0 | 4–1 | 0–1 | 1–1 | 2–1 | 4–0 | 3–2 | 3–1 |
| Eldense | 3–1 | 0–3 | 7–0 | 2–2 | 2–0 | 1–4 | — | 7–2 | 2–0 | 5–1 | 1–1 | 0–0 | 0–2 | 1–2 | 4–0 | 1–1 |
| Extremadura | 4–1 | 3–2 | 1–1 | 4–1 | 3–1 | 1–1 | 5–0 | — | 1–1 | 0–0 | 3–1 | 1–3 | 4–1 | 2–1 | 2–0 | 3–1 |
| Hércules | 1–1 | 1–0 | 2–1 | 5–1 | 1–1 | 1–1 | 1–1 | 5–1 | — | 1–0 | 0–2 | 4–1 | 2–1 | 3–1 | 3–0 | 4–2 |
| Jaén | 2–0 | 3–0 | 0–1 | 2–3 | 1–1 | 4–4 | 5–1 | 1–0 | 2–1 | — | 2–1 | 6–3 | 3–1 | 2–0 | 5–1 | 1–0 |
| Levante | 4–1 | 0–0 | 2–0 | 5–2 | 4–1 | 2–0 | 3–0 | 1–0 | 4–0 | 4–1 | — | 1–0 | 3–0 | 1–0 | 1–0 | 1–0 |
| Málaga | 2–0 | 4–2 | 0–3 | 0–0 | 4–1 | 2–3 | 1–2 | 2–2 | 3–0 | 2–0 | 2–0 | — | 0–1 | 0–0 | 3–0 | 3–0 |
| Murcia | 5–0 | 3–0 | 4–0 | 1–2 | 2–1 | 0–2 | 1–0 | 2–0 | 1–0 | 3–1 | 1–0 | 1–1 | — | 2–0 | 2–2 | 0–0 |
| Plus Ultra | 2–1 | 3–1 | 2–2 | 3–2 | 2–2 | 2–0 | 2–0 | 0–1 | 0–0 | 1–1 | 3–1 | 1–1 | 3–1 | — | 4–0 | 1–1 |
| San Fernando | 2–0 | 0–0 | 3–0 | 1–1 | 2–0 | 3–1 | 0–0 | 3–0 | 2–2 | 4–0 | 3–1 | 1–0 | 2–0 | 5–1 | — | 2–0 |
| Tenerife | 0–0 | 1–0 | 1–1 | 3–0 | 1–1 | 0–3 | 4–1 | 2–0 | 2–1 | 0–0 | 2–1 | 1–0 | 2–0 | 3–1 | 1–0 | — |

Source: BDFútbol
Legend: Blue = home team win; Yellow = draw; Red = away team win.

=== Top goalscorers ===
| Goalscorers | Goals | Team |
|---|---|---|
| (Honduras) José Cardona | 23 | Elche |
| (Spain) Pauet | 20 | Elche |
| (Spain) Mundo | 17 | Eldense |
| (Spain) José Glaría | 15 | Atlético Almería |
| (Spain) Ángel Arregui | 15 | Jaén |

=== Top goalkeepers ===
| Goalkeeper | Goals | Matches | Average | Team |
|---|---|---|---|---|
| (Spain) Santi Lafuente | 34 | 30 | 1.13 | Tenerife |
| (Spain) Juan Mis | 30 | 26 | 1.15 | Atlético Almería |
| (Spain) Vicente Luque | 30 | 22 | 1.36 | Córdoba |
| (Spain) José García | 30 | 21 | 1.43 | Badajoz |
| (Spain) Florentino López | 45 | 29 | 1.55 | Plus Ultra |

== Promotion playoffs ==
=== First leg ===
| 10 May 1959 | Levante | 1–2 | Las Palmas | Valencia |
| | Vila 82' | Report | De Mola 31'; Larraz 65' | Stadium: Vallejo; Referee: Zariquiegui Izco |

| 28 June 1959 | Granada | 5–0 | Sabadell | Granada |
| | Iglesias 24'; Vázquez 30'; Carranza 34', 74', 84' | Report | | Stadium: Los Cármenes; Referee: González Echeverría |

=== Second leg ===
| 17 May 1959 | Las Palmas | 1–1 (3–2 agg.) | Levante | Las Palmas |
| | Macario 64' | Report | Llona 22' | Stadium: Insular; Referee: Castiñeiras Díaz |

| 5 July 1959 | Sabadell | 1–1 (1–6 agg.) | Granada | Sabadell |
| | Sitges 63' | Report | Loren 71' | Stadium: Creu Alta; Referee: Ortiz de Mendibil |

== Relegation playoffs ==
=== First leg ===
| 31 May 1959 | Arenas Zaragoza | 0–2 | Alavés | Zaragoza |
| | | Report | Hormaeche 30'; Zubizarreta 34' | Stadium: San José; Referee: Segrelles del Pilar |

| 31 May 1959 | Turista | 2–2 | Rayo Vallecano | Vigo |
| | Chicha 56'; Chas 62' | Report | Hollaus 75', 80' | Stadium: Barreiro; Referee: Orrantia Capelastegui |

| 31 May 1959 | Mestalla | 0–0 | Hércules | Valencia |
| | | Report | | Stadium: Mestalla; Referee: Mena Simoneau |

| 31 May 1959 | Xerez | 0–0 | Badajoz | Jerez de la Frontera |
| | | Report | | Stadium: Domecq; Referee: Pardo Salgado |

=== Second leg ===
| 7 June 1959 | Alavés | 1–2 (3–2 agg.) | Arenas Zaragoza | Vitoria-Gasteiz |
| | Echeandía 9' | Report | Duarte 1'; Jiménez 83' | Stadium: Mendizorrotza; Referee: Prendes Bernardo |

| 7 June 1959 | Hércules | 0–2 (0–2 agg.) | Mestalla | Alicante |
| | | Report | Albuixech 19', 20' | Stadium: La Viña; Referee: Martín Álvarez |

| 7 June 1959 | Rayo Vallecano | 6–1 (8–3 agg.) | Turista | Madrid |
| | Hollaus 27', 36', 54', 75'; Nino 29'; Cobo 71' | Report | | Stadium: Vallecas; Referee: Castillo Izquierdo |

| 7 June 1959 | Badajoz | 4–0 (4–0 agg.) | Xerez | Badajoz |
| | Tacoronte 15'; Blas 49'; Requena 61'; Cuesta 67' | Report | | Stadium: El Vivero; Referee: Pascual Hernández |
