= CA Almería =

Spanish football club

Atlético Almería
- Full name: Club Atlético Almería
- Founded: 1947
- Dissolved: 1960
- Ground: Ciudad Jardín; Almería, Andalusia, Spain
- Capacity: 10,000
Home colours

Club Atlético Almería was a Spanish football club based in Almería, Andalusia. Founded in 1947, it held home matches at Estadio Ciudad Jardín, with a 10,000 (5,000-seat) capacity.

== History ==
Club Atlético Almería was founded in 1947 by the merger between Almería CF and Náutico Almería CD. Atlético Almería was named as UD Almería between 1947 and 1953.

== Season to season ==
=== As Club Atlético Almería ===
Season	Tier	Division	Place	Copa del Rey
1947–48	3	3ª	7th	
1948–49	3	3ª	5th	
1949–50	3	3ª	12th	
1950–51	3	3ª	4th	
1951–52	3	3ª	2nd	
1952–53	3	3ª	9th	
1953–54	3	3ª	6th	

Season	Tier	Division	Place	Copa del Rey
1954–55	3	3ª	4th	
1955–56	3	3ª	2nd	
1956–57	3	3ª	6th	
1957–58	3	3ª	1st	
1958–59	2	2ª	3rd	
1959–60	2	2ª	15th	

- 2 seasons in Segunda División
- 11 seasons in Tercera División
