= Román Emery (footballer, born 1931) =

Spanish footballer (1931–2023)

Personal information
- Full name: Román Emery Alza
- Date of birth: 5 January 1931
- Place of birth: Irun, Spain
- Date of death: 28 June 2023 (aged 92)
- Position: Midfielder

Senior career*
Years	Team	Apps	(Gls)
1954–1956	Logroñés	48	(0)
1956–1958	CD Málaga	19	(0)
Total		67	(0)
- * Club domestic league appearances and goals

Román Emery Alza (5 January 1931 – 28 June 2023) was a Spanish footballer who played as a midfielder.

== Career ==
Born in Irun, Emery played for Logroñés and CD Málaga.

== Personal life and death ==
His father Antonio, brother Juan, and nephew Unai, were also footballers. Emery died on 28 June 2023, at the age of 92.
