= Antonio Emery =

Spanish footballer

Personal information
- Full name: Antonio Emery Arocena
- Date of birth: 26 July 1905
- Place of birth: Hondarribia, Spain
- Date of death: 29 March 1982 (aged 76)
- Position: Goalkeeper

Senior career*
Years	Team	Apps	(Gls)
1923–1935	Real Unión	110	(0)
Total		110	(0)
- * Club domestic league appearances and goals

Antonio Emery Arocena (26 July 1905 – 29 March 1982) was a Spanish footballer who played as a goalkeeper.

== Career ==
Born in Hondarribia, Emery began his career at Real Unión, initially as a winger, but a few years later, due to an injury to their starting goalkeeper, Unión changed his position to goalkeeper. He played a crucial role in helping the club win two Copa del Rey titles in 1924 and 1927, keeping a clean-sheet against Real Madrid in the former final (1–0) and repeating the feat against Arenas Club de Getxo in the latter final (1–0).

== Personal life ==
His son Juan and brother Román, and grandson Unai, were also footballers. In addition, his two older brothers, defender Francisco Emery and midfielder Román Emery Arocena, preceded him as Real Unión footballers.
