= Manuel Carrasco (footballer) =

Spanish footballer (1894–1935)

Personal information
- Full name: Avito Manuel Carrasco Alonso
- Date of birth: 27 January 1894
- Place of birth: San Sebastián, Gipuzkoa, Spain
- Date of death: 12 March 1935 (aged 41)
- Place of death: Unknown
- Position: Defender

Senior career*
Years	Team	Apps	(Gls)
1912–1915	Racing de Irún		
1915–1918	Real Unión		
1918–1922	Real Sociedad		
1922–1925	Real Unión		

International career
1915–1916	Basque Country		
1920	Spain	0	(0)
Medal record
Men's football
Basque Country
Prince of Asturias Cup
Gold medal – first place	1915 Prince of Asturias Cup	Team
Representing Spain
Olympic Games
Silver medal – second place	1920 Antwerp	Team Competition
- * Club domestic league appearances and goals

Avito Manuel Carrasco Alonso (27 January 1894 – 12 March 1935) was a Spanish footballer who played as a defender for Real Unión and Real Sociedad. He was a member of the Spanish squad that competed in the football tournament of the 1920 Summer Olympics.

== Club career ==
Born in Irun on 27 January 1894, Carrasco began his career at his hometown club Racing de Irún in 1912, aged 18, playing a pivotal role in helping the club win the 1913 Copa del Rey, defeating Athletic Bilbao in the final. In 1915, Carrasco joined Real Unión Club de Irún, the result of the merge between Racing de Irún and Sporting de Irún. He then helped this new team win another Copa del Rey title in 1918, beating Madrid FC 2–0 in the final.

In 1918, Carrasco signed for Real Sociedad, with whom he played for four years, until 1922, playing a total of 28 official matches, all in the Gipuzkoa, including nine in the 1918–19 season, which was won by Sociedad. In 1922, he returned to Real Unión, where he retired in 1925, aged 31.

== International career ==
Being a Real Unión player, Carrasco was eligible to play for the 'North' / Basque Country representative team, being a member of the team that won the first edition of the Prince of Asturias Cup in 1915, an inter-regional competition organized by the RFEF. With the Basque side he formed a great defensive partnership with Athletic's Luis Hurtado, which only conceded one goal in the whole tournament, and that was to Santiago Bernabéu in a 1–1 draw with a Castille/Madrid XI, a draw that was enough for the Basques to win the cup for the first time.

Carrasco was a member of the Spanish squad that competed in the 1920 Summer Olympics, but he failed to feature in a single game as Spain won silver after beating the Netherlands 3–1 in the decisive game.

== Honours ==
=== Club ===
Real Unión

- North Regional Championship:
  - Winners (1) 1917–18
- Copa del Rey:
  - Winners (2) 1913 (Note: As Racing de Irún) and 1918

=== International ===
Spain

- Summer Olympics:
  - Silver medal (1): 1920

Basque Country XI

- Prince of Asturias Cup:
  - Champions (1):1915
