= Manuel Haro =

Spanish footballer

Personal information
- Full name: Manuel Haro Ruiz
- Date of birth: 17 April 1931
- Place of birth: Seville, Spain
- Date of death: 18 October 2013 (aged 82)
- Place of death: Jaén, Spain
- Position: Forward

Senior career*
Years	Team	Apps	(Gls)
1957–1958	Sevilla	2	(0)
1958–1960	Jaén	48	(21)
1960–1962	Mallorca	58	(16)
1962–1963	Levante	25	(9)
1963–1964	Valladolid	12	(2)
1964–1966	Cádiz	51	(16)
1966–1968	Jaén	18	(2)
Total		141	(36)

Managerial career
- 1986: Jaén
- * Club domestic league appearances and goals

Manuel Haro Ruiz (17 April 1931 – 18 October 2013) was a Spanish professional footballer who played as a forward.

== Career ==
Born in Seville, Haro played for Sevilla, Jaén, Mallorca, Levante, Valladolid and Cádiz.

== Later life and death ==
Haro died on 19 October 2013.
