= Ricardo Zamora (footballer) =

Spanish footballer (1933–2003)

Personal information
- Full name: Ricardo Zamora de Grassa
- Date of birth: 6 August 1933
- Place of birth: Madrid, Spain
- Date of death: 31 January 2003 (aged 69)
- Place of death: Madrid, Spain
- Position: Goalkeeper

Senior career*
Years	Team	Apps	(Gls)
1951–1952	Salamanca	22	(0)
1952–1955	Atlético Madrid	6	(0)
1955–1959	Español	7	(0)
1955–1956	→ CD Málaga (loan)	19	(0)
1956–1958	→ Sabadell (loan)	44	(0)
1959–1962	Mallorca	79	(0)
1962–1966	Valencia	97	(0)
Total		274+	(0)
- * Club domestic league appearances and goals

Ricardo Zamora de Grassa (6 August 1933 – 31 January 2003) was a Spanish footballer who played as a goalkeeper.

He played 162 games in La Liga for Atlético Madrid, Espanyol, Mallorca and Valencia. Zamora, also known as Ricardo Zamora II, was the son of international goalkeeper Ricardo Zamora.

== Club career ==
Born in Madrid, Zamora began his career at Salamanca before moving to La Liga club Atlético de Madrid. After three seasons as a reserve at the club, he was signed by RCD Espanyol, while his father was managing the club. In order to avoid accusations of nepotism, he was loaned out to Segunda División club CD Málaga, after talks with Terrassa fell through, and after one season, he was loaned out again, this time to Sabadell, where he spent two seasons. Only in 1958-59 he debuted for Espanyol, but spent the season mainly as a reserve for José Vicente. After that season, he transferred to RCD Mallorca, where he won the Segunda División title. After two seasons for Mallorca in the first level, he was signed by Valencia. After four seasons in the club, where he won two Inter-Cities Fairs Cups, Zamora retired. He died on 31 January 2003, aged 69.

== Honours ==
Mallorca

- Segunda División: 1959–60

Valencia

- Inter-Cities Fairs Cup: 1962, 1963
