= Unai Emery =

Spanish football manager (born 1971)

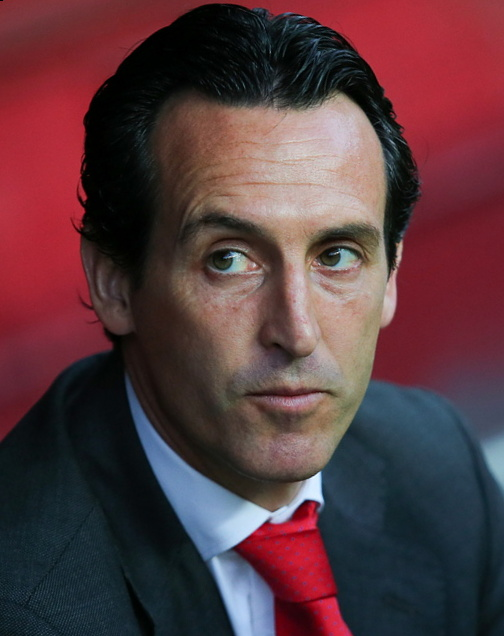
- Emery with Sevilla in 2016

Personal information
- Full name: Unai Emery Etxegoien
- Date of birth: 3 November 1971 (age 55)
- Place of birth: Hondarribia, Spain
- Height: 1.80 m (5 ft 11 in)
- Position: Midfielder

Team information
- Current team: Aston Villa (manager)

Youth career
- 1986–1990: Real Sociedad

Senior career*
| Years | Team | Apps | (Gls) |
| 1990–1995 | Real Sociedad B | 89 | (8) |
| 1995–1996 | Real Sociedad | 5 | (1) |
| 1996–2000 | Toledo | 126 | (2) |
| 2000–2002 | Racing Ferrol | 61 | (7) |
| 2002–2003 | Leganés | 28 | (0) |
| 2003–2004 | Lorca Deportiva | 30 | (1) |
| Total | | 339 | (19) |

Managerial career
- 2004–2006: Lorca Deportiva
- 2006–2008: Almería
- 2008–2012: Valencia
- 2012: Spartak Moscow
- 2013–2016: Sevilla
- 2016–2018: Paris Saint-Germain
- 2018–2019: Arsenal
- 2020–2022: Villarreal
- 2022–: Aston Villa
- * Club domestic league appearances and goals

Unai Emery Etxegoien (born 3 November 1971) is a Spanish football manager and former player who is the manager of Premier League club Aston Villa. Since 2021, he has been the majority shareholder of third-tier Spanish club Real Unión. One of the most successful managers in European continental competitions, Emery holds the record for the most UEFA Europa League titles with five, and is widely considered one of the best managers in the world.

After a career as a midfielder spent mostly in Spain's Segunda División, Emery transitioned into coaching after retiring in 2004. He began at Lorca Deportiva, where he achieved promotion to the Segunda División in his first season. He then joined Almería, whom he led to promotion to La Liga for the first time in the club's history. He subsequently moved to Valencia, leading the team to top-three finishes. After his contract was not renewed at Valencia, he moved to Spartak Moscow for six months but was sacked due to poor performance, before moving to Sevilla in 2013, where he won an unprecedented three consecutive Europa Leagues.

Emery moved to French club Paris Saint-Germain in 2016, where he won a Ligue 1 title, two Coupe de France titles, two Coupe de la Ligues, and two Trophée des Champions, leading the club to a domestic quadruple in his second season. After the expiry of his contract, Emery was appointed as head coach of English club Arsenal in 2018, succeeding Arsène Wenger. He led the club to the 2019 UEFA Europa League final in his only full season before being dismissed in November 2019. He was hired by Villarreal in July 2020, where he won the Europa League in his first season and guided the club to a UEFA Champions League semi-final in the following season. In October 2022, he returned to the Premier League to manage Aston Villa and guided them to a UEFA Conference League semi-final in 2024, the Champions League quarter-finals in 2025 as well as finishing in the top four of the Premier League on two occasions. In 2026, with Aston Villa, he won his fifth Europa League title.

== Early and personal life ==
Emery was born in Hondarribia, Gipuzkoa, Basque Country, Spain. He is a native speaker of the Basque language. His father and grandfather, named Juan and Antonio respectively, were also footballers, both goalkeepers. The former appeared for several clubs in the second tier including Real Unión, while the latter competed with that club in the top division. Emery's uncle, Román, played as a midfielder. In July 2021, the Emery family completed a takeover of Real Unión, and his brother Igor became club president.

Emery's wife is Luisa Fernández. Their son Lander, also a goalkeeper, played for Aston Villa's Under-21s team between January 2024 and July 2025 and currently plays for Real Unión – the third member of the Emery family to wear the goalkeeper jersey for the club.

== Playing career ==
Emery, a left-sided midfielder, was a youth graduate of Real Sociedad, but never really broke into the first team (aged 24 he appeared in five La Liga games, scoring against Albacete in an 8–1 home win). After that, he resumed his career mostly in the Segunda División, amassing totals of 215 matches and nine goals over seven seasons. He retired with Lorca Deportiva at the age of 32, after one season in Segunda División B. In 2002, he signed for Burgos but was one of several players released before making a single competitive appearance due to lack of funds.

== Managerial career ==
=== Lorca and Almería ===
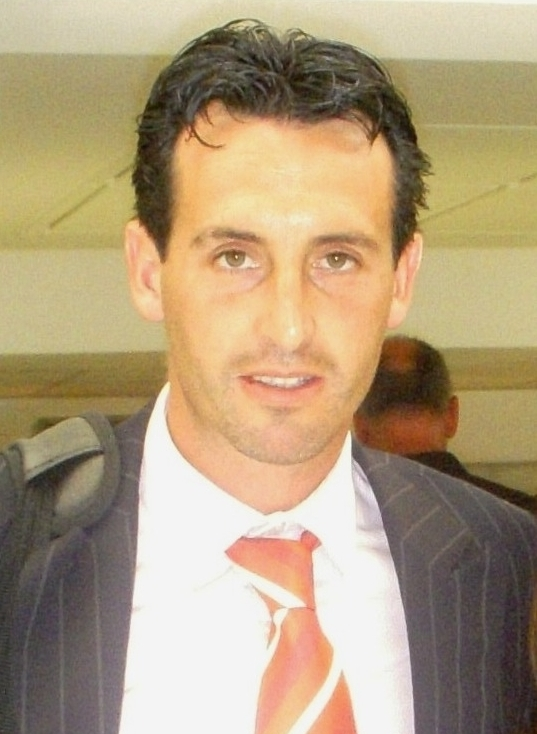
Emery with Almería

Emery suffered a serious knee injury while at Lorca in the 2004–05 season, and he was offered the vacant coach's position by the club president. He immediately helped the club achieve promotion to the second division for the first time in its history, as well as beating top-level side Málaga in the Copa del Rey. He was subsequently awarded the Miguel Muñoz Trophy as coach of the season. In his second season, the Murcians' first ever in the second division, the team finished fifth with 69 points, only five points off promotion to the top flight; they suffered relegation in 2007, after Emery's departure.

Emery then moved to Almería in division two, and again helped his squad overachieve: after guiding them to a first ever promotion in 2007, the Andalusian side finished eighth in La Liga in 2007–08. This prompted a move to Valencia, where he succeeded Ronald Koeman as coach.

=== Valencia ===
In 2008–09, his first season with Los Che, Emery led them to a sixth-place finish, with subsequent qualification to the UEFA Europa League, in spite of the club's serious financial problems. The team reached the Round of 32 in the UEFA Cup, losing on away goals after a 3–3 aggregate draw against Dynamo Kyiv, and the quarter-finals of the Copa del Rey, exiting against Sevilla.

In 2009–10, Emery led Valencia to third place, so the club returned to the UEFA Champions League after two years. After dropping down to Europa League (previously known as UEFA Cup), they lost in the quarter-finals to eventual winners Atlético Madrid on away goals, and exited in the round of 16 in the Copa del Rey against Deportivo La Coruña, losing 4–3 on aggregate. In May 2010, Emery renewed his contract for another year.

2010–11 started without David Villa and David Silva, sold to Barcelona and Manchester City respectively. Despite this, Valencia won five out of the first six league games (with one draw), starting the Champions League campaign with a 4–0 win in Turkey against Bursaspor, before being eliminated in the round of 16 by Schalke 04, and being knocked out in the same stage in the Copa del Rey by Villarreal. In the domestic league, the side finished third, thus again qualifying for the Champions League.

In 2011–12, Emery's side entered the Champions League and were paired with Chelsea, Bayer Leverkusen and KRC Genk. They finished third in their group and subsequently entered the Europa League. Valencia lost in the semi-finals to eventual winners Atlético Madrid again. He left the club in June 2012, after again finishing third in 2011–12, ensuring Valencia's qualification for Champions League.

=== Spartak Moscow ===
On 1 July 2012, Leonid Fedun, owner of Spartak Moscow, announced Emery as the Russian club's coach for the following two seasons. On 25 November, he was sacked after a run of poor results, after only managing the side for six months. His last game in charge was a 5–1 home loss in the derby against Dynamo Moscow.

=== Sevilla ===
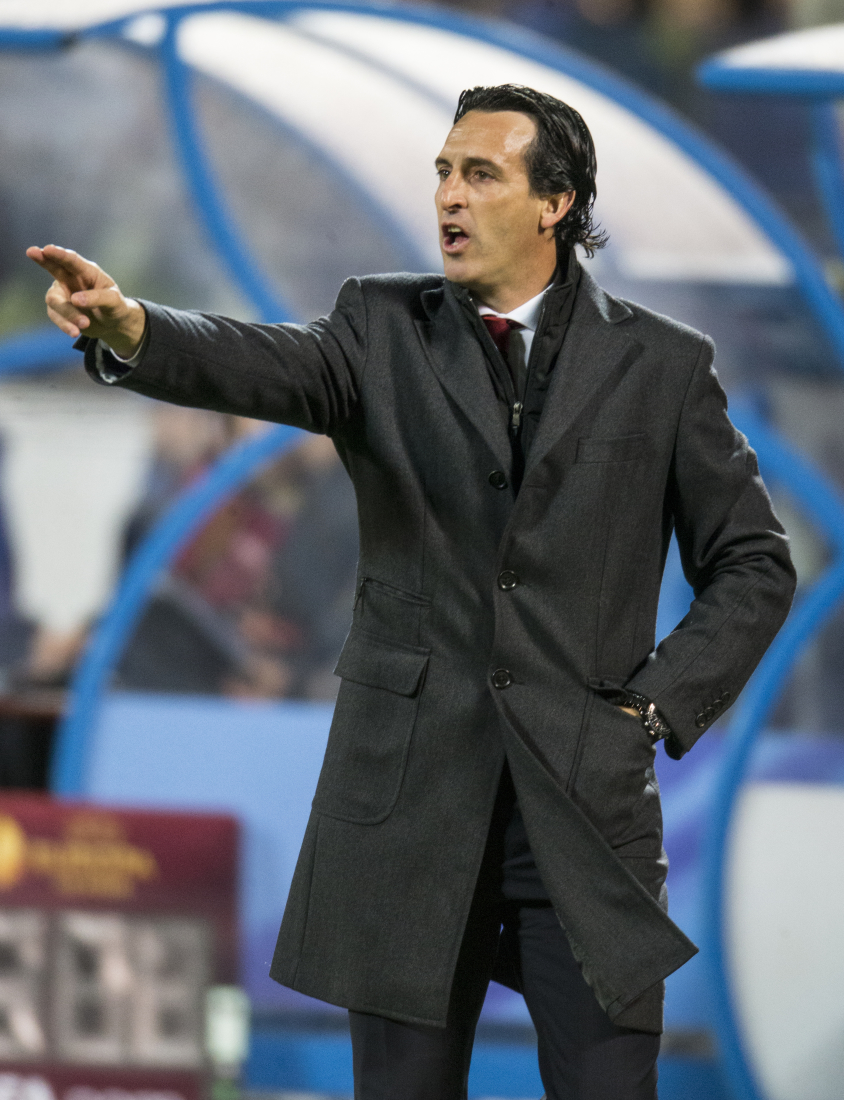
Emery managing Sevilla in 2015

Emery returned to Spanish football on 14 January 2013, replacing the sacked Míchel at the helm of Sevilla. He led the club to fifth position in 2013–14, his first full season. On 14 May 2014, he won the Europa League final, defeating Benfica on penalties.

After finishing the 2014–15 season in fifth place, one point behind former club Valencia, Emery again won the Europa League after defeating Dnipro Dnipropetrovsk, thus qualifying for the following Champions League. The victory meant that Sevilla became the most successful club in the history of the UEFA Cup/Europa League, with four wins, and Emery signed a one-year contract extension on 5 June 2015 which would have kept him at the club until 2017, after reported interest from West Ham United and Napoli.

In 2015–16, Emery led Sevilla to seventh position, having played the final games of the domestic league with several reserves and youth team players after the team confirmed their place in the Europa League final. This season, Sevilla entered the UEFA Champions League group stage as title holders of UEFA Europa League the previous season, they were third in the group and transferred to UEFA Europa League again. On 18 May 2016, despite trailing 1–0 at half-time, a goal from Kevin Gameiro and two from Coke resulted in a 3–1 victory over Liverpool at St. Jakob-Park in Basel.

On 12 June 2016, after Emery expressed his desire to leave Sevilla, the club announced that they would be parting ways.

=== Paris Saint-Germain ===
On 28 June 2016, Emery signed a two-year deal, with the option of a third, to succeed Laurent Blanc at French quadruple-holders Paris Saint-Germain. In his first competitive match in charge, on 6 August, his side beat Lyon 4–1 in Austria to lift the Trophée des Champions.

Emery picked up his second honour with les Rouge-et-Bleu on 1 April 2017 with a 4–1 win over title rivals Monaco in the final of the Coupe de la Ligue. Emery led PSG to second place in their group of the Champions League, behind Arsenal. In the first knockout round they defeated Barcelona 4–0 at the Parc des Princes, only to historically lose 6–1 in Spain and subsequently be eliminated.

In the next Champions League season, PSG finished top of their group, in which Emery led them to a 3–0 win over Bayern Munich in the second match. However, they were knocked out in the round of 16, as they lost both legs by the eventual winner Real Madrid. Domestically, the team won a quadruple of all four domestic honours: Trophée des Champions, Coupe de la Ligue, Coupe de France and Ligue 1. On 28 April 2018, Emery announced his decision to leave the Parisian club at the end of the season with a year left on his contract. He was replaced by German coach Thomas Tuchel at PSG following the conclusion of the 2017–18 season.

=== Arsenal ===
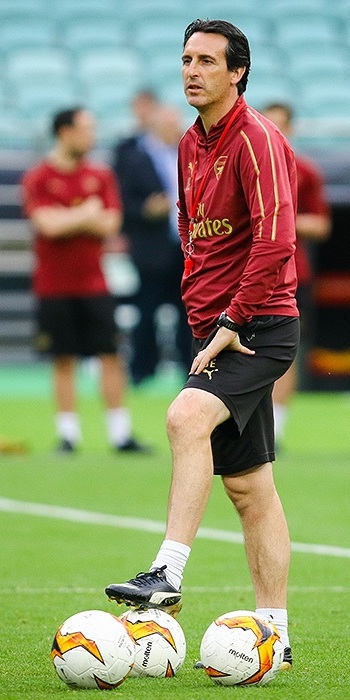
Emery with Arsenal in 2019

On 23 May 2018, Emery was appointed head coach of Arsenal. He agreed to a two-year deal, with the club having the option to extend his deal for a further year.

In his first competitive game in charge, on 12 August, his side lost to Manchester City 2–0 in the Premier League. After a second consecutive loss to Chelsea on 18 August, Emery recorded his first win as Arsenal manager on 25 August, in a 3–1 home win over West Ham United. After this game, Arsenal won 11 games in a row, their best run of form since 2007. Arsenal then extended their unbeaten run to 22 games, including a 4–2 win over arch-rivals Tottenham Hotspur in Emery's first North London derby. Their 3–2 loss to Southampton in December was the first time they had been defeated in all competitions since August. However Arsenal capitulated towards the end of the season, only receiving four points in their last five league matches, effectively discarding any chance of qualifying for the Champions League through league position. Emery yet again reached a Europa League final, but was unsuccessful as Arsenal were beaten 4–1 by fellow English side Chelsea. Arsenal finished the season in fifth position, one place higher than the previous season, narrowly missing out on a Champions League spot.

In the 2019 summer transfer window, Emery broke Arsenal's previous club record by signing Ivory Coast winger Nicolas Pépé. He also brought into the defence David Luiz from rivals Chelsea and Scotsman Kieran Tierney from Celtic, as well as midfielder Dani Ceballos on loan from Real Madrid.

On 29 November 2019, following a series of poor results and a winless run of seven games, Emery was sacked by Arsenal. His final game in charge was a 2–1 home defeat to Eintracht Frankfurt in the Europa League. He was replaced on an interim basis by Freddie Ljungberg and later on a permanent basis by Mikel Arteta.

=== Villarreal ===
On 23 July 2020, Emery was announced as the new head coach of La Liga club Villarreal, succeeding Javier Calleja on a three-year deal. On 23 December, he broke the club record of 18 matches unbeaten, after a 1–1 draw at home to Athletic Bilbao.

In May 2021, he led Villarreal to their first European final, after a 2–1 win on aggregate over his former club Arsenal in the semi-finals; he was the first ex-Gunners boss to beat his former team since George Graham in 1999. On 26 May, Villarreal won the Europa League final against Manchester United in Gdańsk, 11–10 on penalties after a 1–1 draw, to give him his fourth and a record win in the competition.

In November 2021, Emery was approached for the vacant managerial spot at Newcastle United following their Saudi-led takeover. He turned down the interest, saying that he was "100% committed" to Villarreal and that the English team had a "lack of a clear vision". In the 2021–22 UEFA Champions League, he led Villarreal to the semi-finals by beating Juventus and Bayern Munich, before being eliminated by Liverpool.

=== Aston Villa ===
==== 2022–23: From relegation fight to Europe ====
On 24 October 2022, Emery was appointed as head coach of Aston Villa after the Premier League team paid a buyout fee of a reported €6 million (£5.2 million) to Villarreal. Due to work permit formalities, he did not take up his post until 1 November, with Villa having only won two of their first eleven games under previous manager Steven Gerrard before his sacking, and sitting in 16th place in the league table, two places and one point above the relegation zone. Upon taking charge, he appointed Pako Ayestarán as his assistant manager, reuniting with the coach he had worked alongside at Valencia. On 6 November, Emery won his first match in charge with a 3–1 win over Manchester United, Villa's first home Premier League victory against United since August 1995. His team were eliminated from the third round of the FA Cup 2–1 at home by EFL League Two team Stevenage on 8 January 2023. He criticised the mentality of his players after the game.

Villa would win fifteen of their twenty-five league games under Emery and 49 points from a possible 75 since his appointment during the 2022–23 campaign, with only Manchester City, Arsenal, Manchester United and Liverpool securing more points since Emery's appointment. A 1–1 draw with Brentford on 22 April 2023 at the Brentford Community Stadium, Emery's nineteenth league game in charge at Villa, saw the team break the Premier League record for the longest consecutive scoring run a team has had from the start of a manager's tenure in the competition's history. A 1–0 victory over Fulham three days later stretched the new record to twenty consecutive games, before a 1–0 loss to Manchester United on 30 April 2023 ended the run. Five wins, one draw and one defeat in April 2023 led to Emery being awarded Premier League Manager of the Month.

A 1–1 draw with Liverpool on 20 May guaranteed a ninth-placed finish, Villa's highest in the Premier League since the 2010–11 season. Villa secured a 7th-place finish and qualification for the UEFA Europa Conference League, the club's first participation in European football since the 2010–11 season and Emery's sixteenth consecutive season of European football. Many sports journalists and pundits praised Emery's transformation of Villa in such a short space of time, and Emery was nominated for the Premier League Manager of the Season Award. The recipient of the award, Pep Guardiola, also acknowledged Emery in his acceptance speech, along with the other nominees, for each's "incredible job this season".

A 3–0 win against Newcastle United on 15 April 2023 saw Villa win five Premier League games in a row for the first time since 1998, and victory at Villa Park against Brighton on the final matchday not only meant The Villans' first time winning seven consecutive league games at home since the 1992–93 season, but also their eighteenth league win of the season, the fifteenth under Emery, for their joint-most league wins in a 38-game season.

==== 2023–24: Champions League qualification ====
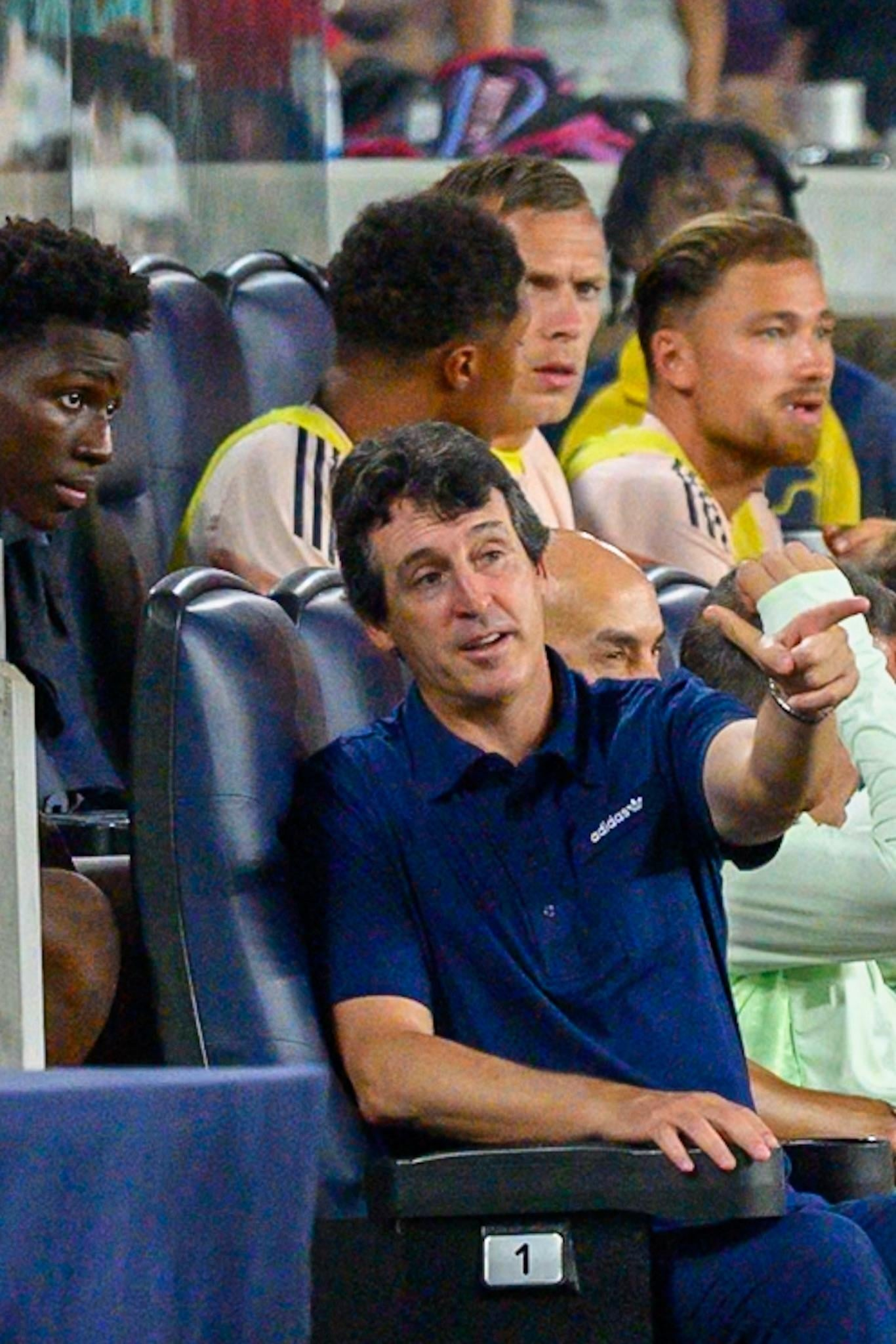
Emery managing Aston Villa in 2025 during pre-season

The summer of 2023 also saw major changes in Aston Villa's infrastructure as Sevilla's sporting director Monchi, who had previously worked with Emery, was appointed as President of Football Operations, as well as Damian Vidagany as Director of Football Operations. Aston Villa signed Pau Torres from Villarreal for a reported £33m, and Moussa Diaby from Bayer Leverkusen for an undisclosed fee, with many outlets reporting the fee to be in excess of £50m, breaking Villa's previous transfer record.

After a 5–1 defeat to Newcastle United at St James' Park in their opening fixture of the 2023–24 season, Emery led Villa to their highest Premier League points total after 19 games, the season's midpoint. Emery's Villa maintained a 100% record in their first eight home games of the season for the first time since the 1932–33 season, and a 1–0 victory against Arsenal on 9 December was their fifteenth consecutive home league win, going back to 4 March, the most in the club's 149-year history. Aston Villa won five of seven games in December 2023, including back-to-back wins against Manchester City and Arsenal, which led to Emery being named Premier League Manager of the Month for the second time in his career.

In the Conference League, Villa beat Ajax 4–0 on aggregate in the round of 16, and then Lille on penalties to reach a first European semi-final since 1982. On 23 April, Emery extended his contract until 2027. He eventually led the club to a 4th-place finish in the league, securing qualification to the UEFA Champions League for the first time since 1982–83. On 27 May 2024, Emery extended his contract until 2029.

==== 2024–present: European adventures ====
In the 2024–25 Champions League, Emery led the club to reach the quarterfinals of the competition before being eliminated by his former club and eventual winners PSG 4–5 on aggregate. However, following a loss to Manchester United in the final fixture, marred by a refereeing error by Thomas Bramall that saw a goal ruled out for Villa, they missed out on a consecutive Champions League qualification on the final day, instead entering the 2025–26 Europa League.

Under Emery, Villa started the 2025–26 season off poorly, with only three points and no wins from their first five league games. However, following a good run of form, including eight league wins in a row and a record-equalling eleven consecutive wins in all competitions, the team entered European contention again. On 19 March 2026, Emery reached his 100th win with the club in a 2–0 victory over Lille in the Europa League round of 16, becoming the third manager to achieve this feat at the club following Ron Saunders and Joe Mercer. On 7 May 2026, after beating Nottingham Forest 4–1 on aggregate, Emery brought Aston Villa to the Europa League final, the club's first European final in 44 years, which they won against Freiburg 3–0 on 20 May. With this, Emery won his fifth Europa League title, extending his record for Europa League titles won. Following a 4–2 win over Liverpool in their second-last game of the season, Villa qualified for the 2026–27 Champions League.

Following the 2025–26 season, Emery made several changes to his coaching staff, with assistant manager Pako Ayestarán departing after working alongside him since his appointment at Aston Villa in 2022. In September 2026, Emery was nominated for the Johan Cruyff Trophy, the award for the best men's manager in the world, presented at the 2026 Ballon d'Or awards ceremony.

== Managerial statistics ==
As of match played 21 November 2026

Managerial record by team and tenure
| Team | From | To | Record | | | | | Ref. |
| Team | From | To | P | W | D | L | Win % | Ref. |
|---|---|---|---|---|---|---|---|---|
| Lorca Deportiva | 21 December 2004 | 22 June 2006 | 70 | 34 | 16 | 20 | 48.6 | |
| Almería | 22 June 2006 | 22 May 2008 | 84 | 39 | 20 | 25 | 46.4 | |
| Valencia | 22 May 2008 | 14 May 2012 | 220 | 107 | 58 | 55 | 48.6 | |
| Spartak Moscow | 1 July 2012 | 25 November 2012 | 26 | 12 | 4 | 10 | 46.2 | |
| Sevilla | 14 January 2013 | 12 June 2016 | 205 | 106 | 43 | 56 | 51.7 | |
| Paris Saint-Germain | 28 June 2016 | 14 May 2018 | 114 | 87 | 15 | 12 | 76.3 | |
| Arsenal | 23 May 2018 | 29 November 2019 | 78 | 43 | 16 | 19 | 55.1 | |
| Villarreal | 23 July 2020 | 25 October 2022 | 129 | 64 | 35 | 30 | 49.6 | |
| Aston Villa | 1 November 2022 (Note: Emery's appointment was announced on 24 October 2022 but did not take effect until 1 November. The intervening match against Newcastle United was taken by caretaker manager Aaron Danks.) | Present | 214 | 116 | 39 | 59 | 54.2 | |
| Total | | | 1,140 | 608 | 246 | 286 | 53.3 | |

== Honours ==
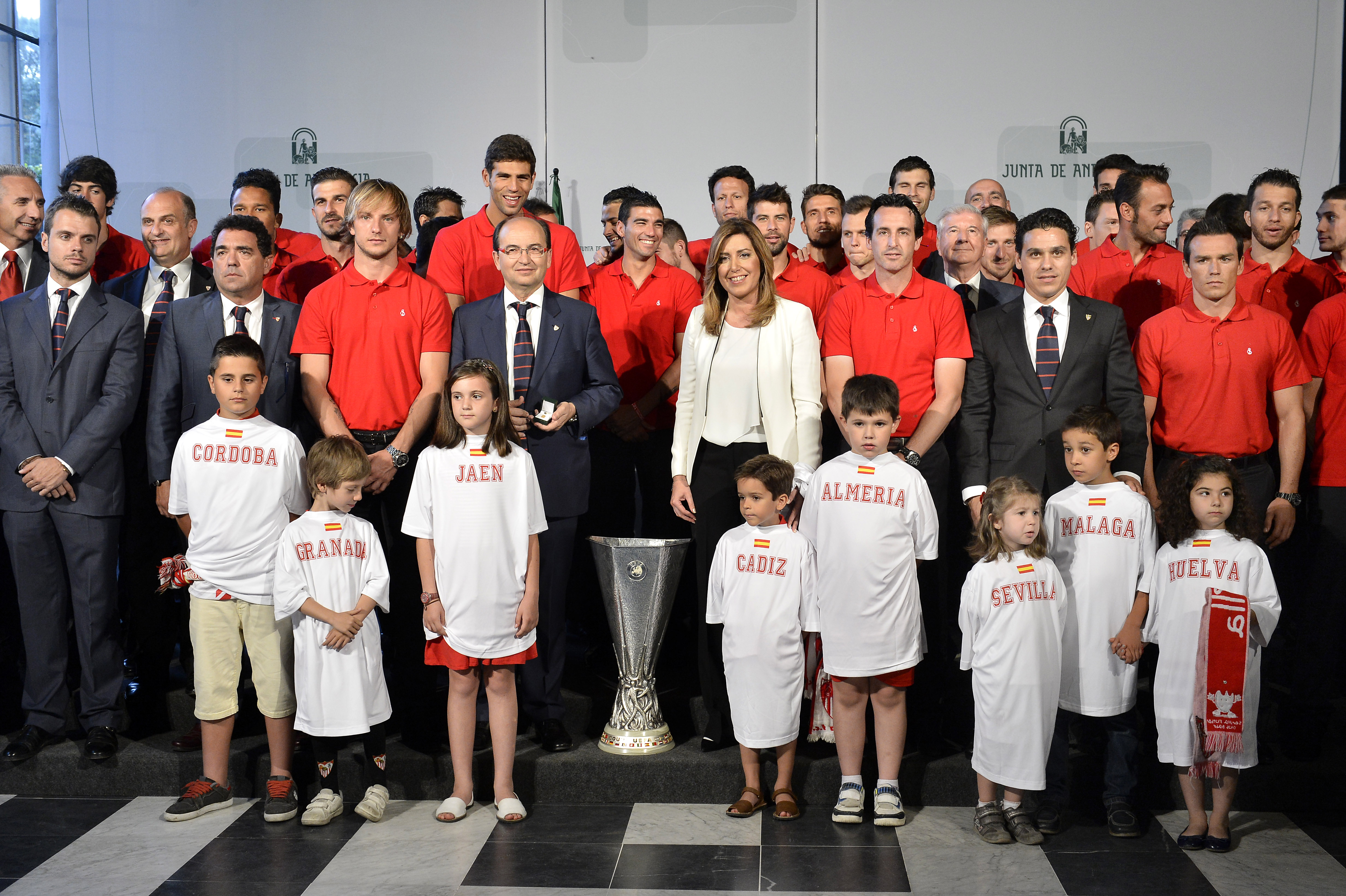
Emery and Sevilla after winning the UEFA Europa League in 2014

=== Manager ===
Sevilla

- UEFA Europa League: 2013–14, 2014–15, 2015–16

Paris Saint-Germain

- Ligue 1: 2017–18
- Coupe de France: 2016–17, 2017–18
- Coupe de la Ligue: 2016–17, 2017–18
- Trophée des Champions: 2016, 2017

Arsenal

- UEFA Europa League runner-up: 2018–19

Villarreal

- UEFA Europa League: 2020–21

Aston Villa

- UEFA Europa League: 2025–26

Individual

- Miguel Muñoz Trophy (Segunda División): 2005–06, 2006–07
- La Liga Manager of the Month: March 2014, January 2015, January 2016
- UNFP Manager of the Year: 2017–18
- Globe Soccer Awards Coach Career Award: 2022
- Premier League Manager of the Month: April 2023, December 2023, December 2025

== See also ==
- List of UEFA Cup and Europa League–winning managers
- List of football managers with the most matches
