= Emilio Morollón =

Spanish footballer

Personal information
- Full name: Emilio Morollón Estébanez
- Date of birth: 23 July 1937
- Place of birth: Madrid, Spain
- Date of death: 17 February 1992 (aged 54)
- Place of death: Valladolid, Spain
- Position: Forward

Youth career
- Valladolid
- Salamanca

Senior career*
| Years | Team | Apps | (Gls) |
| 1956–1957 | Salamanca | | |
| 1957–1958 | Béjar | | |
| 1958–1964 | Valladolid | 108 | (41) |
| 1964–1965 | Real Madrid | 1 | (1) |
| 1965–1966 | Sabadell | 9 | (2) |
| 1966–1967 | Valladolid | | |
| 1967 | Ponferradina | 8 | (4) |
| 1967–1968 | Castellón | 14 | (5) |
| 1969–1970 | Europa Delicias | | |

International career
| 1960 | Spain U21 | 2 | (0) |
| 1963 | Spain | 2 | (0) |
- * Club domestic league appearances and goals

Emilio Morollón Estébanez (23 July 1937 – 17 February 1992) was a Spanish footballer who played as a forward.

== Honours ==
=== Team ===
Real Madrid

- La Liga: 1964–65

=== Individual ===
- Pichichi Trophy (Segunda División): 1958–59
