= Fritz Hollaus =

Austrian footballer (1929–1994)

Personal information
- Full name: Friedrich Jörg Hollaus
- Date of birth: 21 October 1929
- Place of birth: Vienna, Austria
- Date of death: February 1994 (aged 64)
- Positions: Defender; striker

Senior career*
Years	Team	Apps	(Gls)
1948–1949	SC Rapid Oberlaa		
1949–1954	Wiener Sport-Club		
1954–1957	SV Stadlau		
1957	Wiener Sport-Club		
1957–1958	Atlético Madrid		
1958–1961	Real Mallorca		
1961–1966	Wiener Sport-Club		
- * Club domestic league appearances and goals

Friedrich Jörg "Fritz" Hollaus (21 October 1929 – February 1994) was an Austrian footballer who played in Austria for SC Rapid Oberlaa, Wiener Sportclub and SV Stadlau, and in Spain for Atlético Madrid and Real Mallorca.
